= New England Patriots =

NFL team in Foxborough, Massachusetts

- Current season
Logo	Wordmark
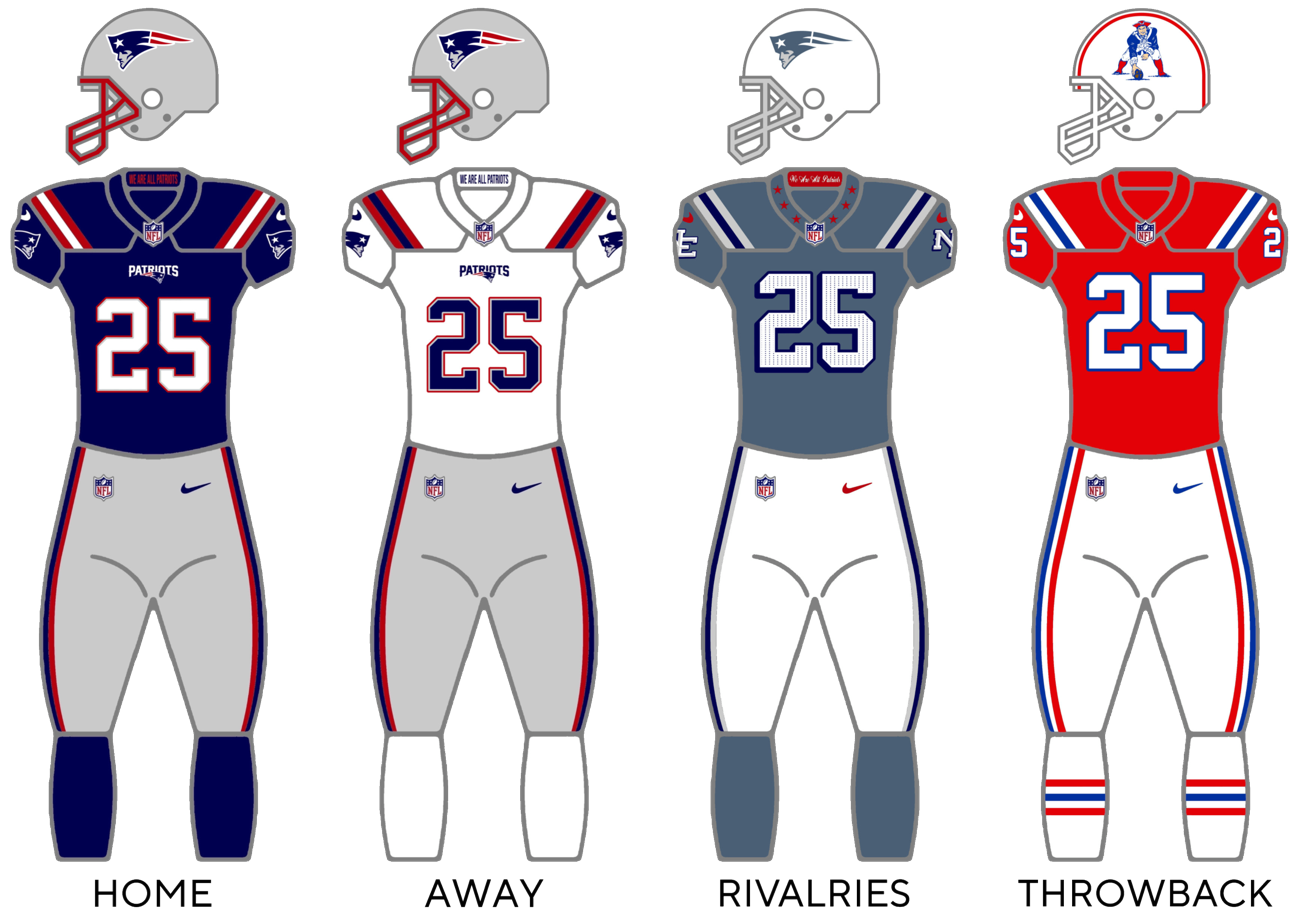
- Uniforms

General information
- Founded: November 16, 1959; 67 years ago
- Stadium: Gillette Stadium; Foxborough, Massachusetts
- Headquartered: Gillette Stadium; Foxborough, Massachusetts
- Colors: Nautical blue, red, new century silver, white
- Fight songs: "Crazy Train"; "This Is Our House"; "I'm Shipping Up to Boston"
- Mascot: Pat Patriot
- Website: patriots.com

Personnel
- Owners: Kraft Group; Robert Kraft, Chairman
- CEO: Robert Kraft
- General manager: Eliot Wolf
- Head coach: Mike Vrabel
- President: Jonathan Kraft

Nicknames
- The Pats; Grogan's Heroes (1976); The Evil Empire; The Boston TE Party (tight ends; 2010–2012); The Boogeymen (Linebackers; 2019)

Team history
- Boston Patriots (1960–1970); New England Patriots (1971–present)

Home fields
- Boston University Field (1960–1962); Fenway Park (1963–1968); Alumni Stadium (1969); Harvard Stadium (1970); Foxboro Stadium (1971–2001); Gillette Stadium (2002–present)

League / conference affiliations
- American Football League (1960–1969): Eastern Division (1960–1969); National Football League (1970–present): American Football Conference (1970–present); AFC East (1970–present)

Championships
- Super Bowl championships: 6 2001 (XXXVI), 2003 (XXXVIII), 2004 (XXXIX), 2014 (XLIX), 2016 (LI), 2018 (LIII)
- Conference championships: 12: AFC: 1985, 1996, 2001, 2003, 2004, 2007, 2011, 2014, 2016, 2017, 2018, 2025
- Division championships: 23: AFL East: 1963; AFC East: 1978, 1986, 1996, 1997, 2001, 2003, 2004, 2005, 2006, 2007, 2009, 2010, 2011, 2012, 2013, 2014, 2015, 2016, 2017, 2018, 2019, 2025

Playoff appearances (29)
- AFL: 1963; NFL: 1976, 1978, 1982, 1985, 1986, 1994, 1996, 1997, 1998, 2001, 2003, 2004, 2005, 2006, 2007, 2009, 2010, 2011, 2012, 2013, 2014, 2015, 2016, 2017, 2018, 2019, 2021, 2025

Owners
- Billy Sullivan (1959–1988); Victor Kiam (1988–1992); James Orthwein (1992–1994); Robert Kraft (1994–present)

The New England Patriots (colloquially known as the Pats) are a professional American football team based in the Greater Boston area. The Patriots compete in the National Football League (NFL) as a member of the American Football Conference (AFC) East division. The team plays its home games at Gillette Stadium in Foxborough, Massachusetts, which is 22 miles (35 km) southwest of Boston. The franchise is owned by Robert Kraft, who purchased the team in 1994. As of 2025, the Patriots are the seventh-most valuable sports team in the world and have sold out every home game since 1994.

Founded in 1959 as the Boston Patriots, the team was a charter member of the American Football League (AFL) before joining the NFL in 1970 through the AFL–NFL merger. The Patriots played their home games at various stadiums throughout Boston, including Fenway Park from 1963 to 1968, until the franchise moved to Foxborough in 1971. As part of the move, the team changed its name to the New England Patriots. Home games were played at Foxboro Stadium until 2002 when the stadium was demolished alongside the opening of Gillette Stadium. The team began using Gillette Stadium for home games the same year.

Generally mediocre until coming under the ownership of Robert Kraft, the Patriots experienced unexpected success in the 2001 season under head coach Bill Belichick and quarterback Tom Brady, which started a period of dominance which lasted until the 2019 season. The Brady–Belichick era, regarded as one of the greatest sports dynasties, would see the Patriots claim nearly every major Super Bowl record. The Patriots hold the records for most Super Bowl wins (6, tied with the Pittsburgh Steelers), appearances (12), and losses (6). Other NFL records held by the franchise include the most wins in a 10-year period (126 from 2003 to 2012), the longest winning streak of regular season and playoff games (21 from October 2003 to October 2004), the second most consecutive winning seasons (19 from 2001 to 2019), second only to the Dallas Cowboys (20 from 1966 to 1985), the most consecutive conference championship appearances (8 from 2011 to 2018), the most consecutive division titles (11 from 2009 to 2019), the only undefeated 16-game regular season (2007), the most postseason wins (40, tied with the San Francisco 49ers), and the highest postseason winning percentage (.638).

== History ==
=== AFL years (1959–1970) ===
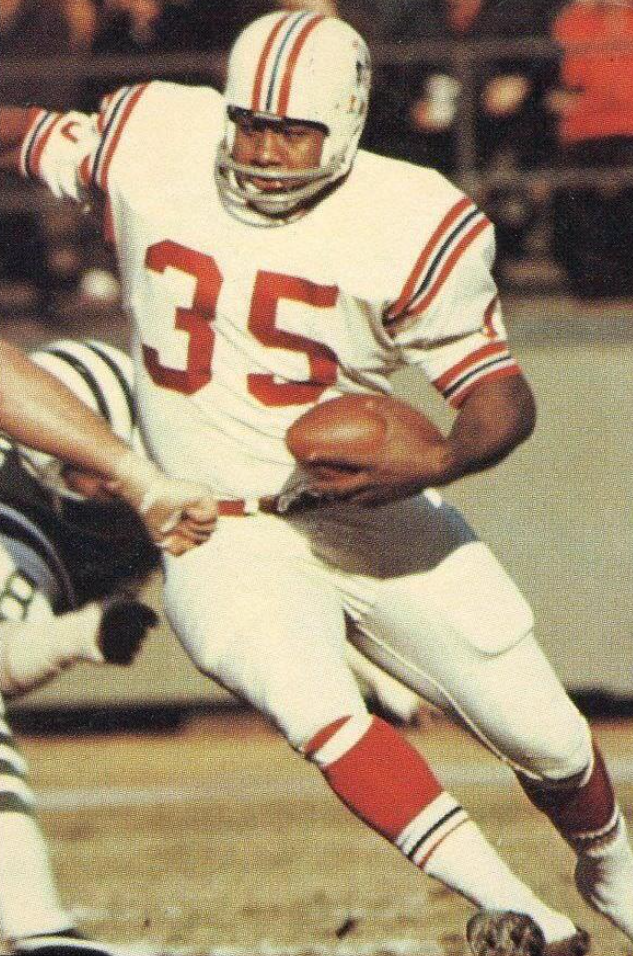
Running back Jim Nance set the AFL single-season rushing record with 1,458 yards in 1966—a year he was named AFL MVP—and followed up with 1,216 yards in 1967

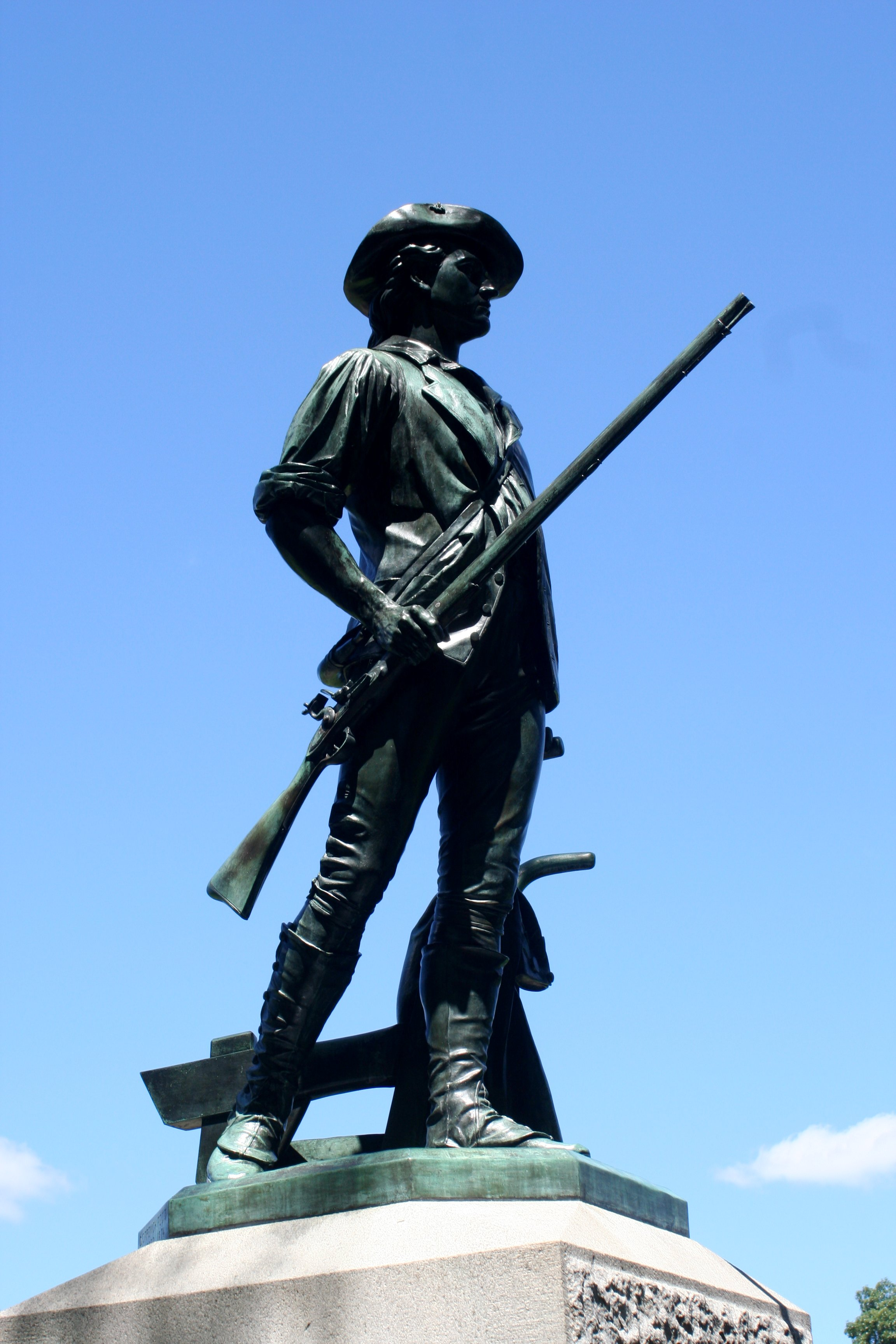
The Patriots are named after the colonists who rebelled against British control during the Revolutionary War, which was locally relevant due to the colony of Massachusetts playing a pivotal role in American independence. (Image: Minute Man statue in Concord, Massachusetts)

On November 16, 1959, Boston business executive Billy Sullivan was awarded the eighth and final franchise of the developing American Football League (AFL). The following winter, locals were allowed to submit ideas for the Boston football team's official name. The most popular choice – and the one that Sullivan selected – was the "Boston Patriots", with "Patriots" referring to the colonists of the Thirteen Colonies who rebelled against British control during the American Revolution and in July 1776 declared the United States of America an independent nation, which heavily involved the then–colony of Massachusetts. Immediately thereafter, artist Phil Bissell of The Boston Globe developed the "Pat Patriot" logo.

The Patriots never had a regular home stadium in the AFL. Boston University Field, Harvard Stadium, Fenway Park (shared with Major League Baseball's Boston Red Sox), and Boston College's Alumni Stadium all served as home fields during their time in the American Football League. The 1963 season saw the franchise's first playoff win over Buffalo to clinch the division. They subsequently lost the AFL Championship game to the San Diego Chargers 51–10. They did not appear again in an AFL or NFL post-season game for another 13 years.

=== Post-merger years (1970–2000) ===
When the NFL and AFL merged in 1970, the Patriots were placed in the American Football Conference (AFC) East division, where they still play. The following year, the Patriots moved to a new stadium in Foxborough, Massachusetts, their home for the next 30 years, and changed their name from the Boston Patriots to the Bay State Patriots, after the state of Massachusetts. The name was rejected by the NFL and on March 22, 1971, the team officially announced they would change its geographic name to New England.

Anchored by offensive lineman John Hannah, widely regarded among the greatest at his position, along with future Hall of Famers Mike Haynes (cornerback) and Andre Tippett (linebacker), the Patriots achieved intermittent success during the 1970s and 1980s. Raymond Berry took over the coaching reins in 1984 and led the Patriots to a 51–41 record the next five and a half years. Berry's 1985 team had an 11–5 record, earned a wild-card playoff berth, and won three straight AFC playoff games on the road to advance to Super Bowl XX, which they lost to the Chicago Bears 46–10. Berry left the team after a disappointing 1989 season, and his replacement Rod Rust only lasted one season, 1990, during which the Patriots went 1–15.

==== Ownership turmoil ====
In the mid-1970s, team owner Billy Sullivan temporarily lost control of the Patriots despite holding a significant ownership stake (20% of the voting stock), but regained it after buying out minority partners and public shareholders. The buyout later led to a Massachusetts Supreme Judicial Court ruling that the transaction was illegal and required additional compensation to shareholders. Financial difficulties intensified in the 1980s, particularly after heavy losses tied to financing The Jacksons' 1984 Victory Tour, which had been secured using Sullivan Stadium as collateral. Mounting debt ultimately forced the Sullivans to place both the Patriots and the stadium on the market in 1985, despite the team's Super Bowl appearance that season.

In the years that followed, the team changed ownership several times. Victor Kiam purchased the Patriots in 1988, selling the team to James Orthwein in 1992. Though Orthwein's period as owner was short and controversial, he did oversee major changes to the team, first with the hiring of former New York Giants coach Bill Parcells in 1993. Orthwein and his marketing team then defied Patriots fans' overwhelming preference and commissioned the NFL to develop a new visual identity and logo, and changed their primary colors from the traditional red, white and blue to blue and silver for the team uniforms. Orthwein intended to move the team to his native St. Louis (where it would have been renamed as the St. Louis Stallions), but instead sold the team in 1994 for $175 million to Boston paper magnate Robert Kraft, who had bought the Patriots' then-home, Foxboro Stadium, out of bankruptcy in 1988.

Continuing on as head coach under Kraft's ownership, Parcells would bring the Patriots to two playoff appearances, including Super Bowl XXXI following the 1996 season, which they lost to the Green Bay Packers by a score of 35–21. Pete Carroll, Parcells's successor, would also take the team to the playoffs twice in 1997 and 1998 before being dismissed as head coach after the 1999 season.

=== Brady–Belichick era (2000–2019) ===
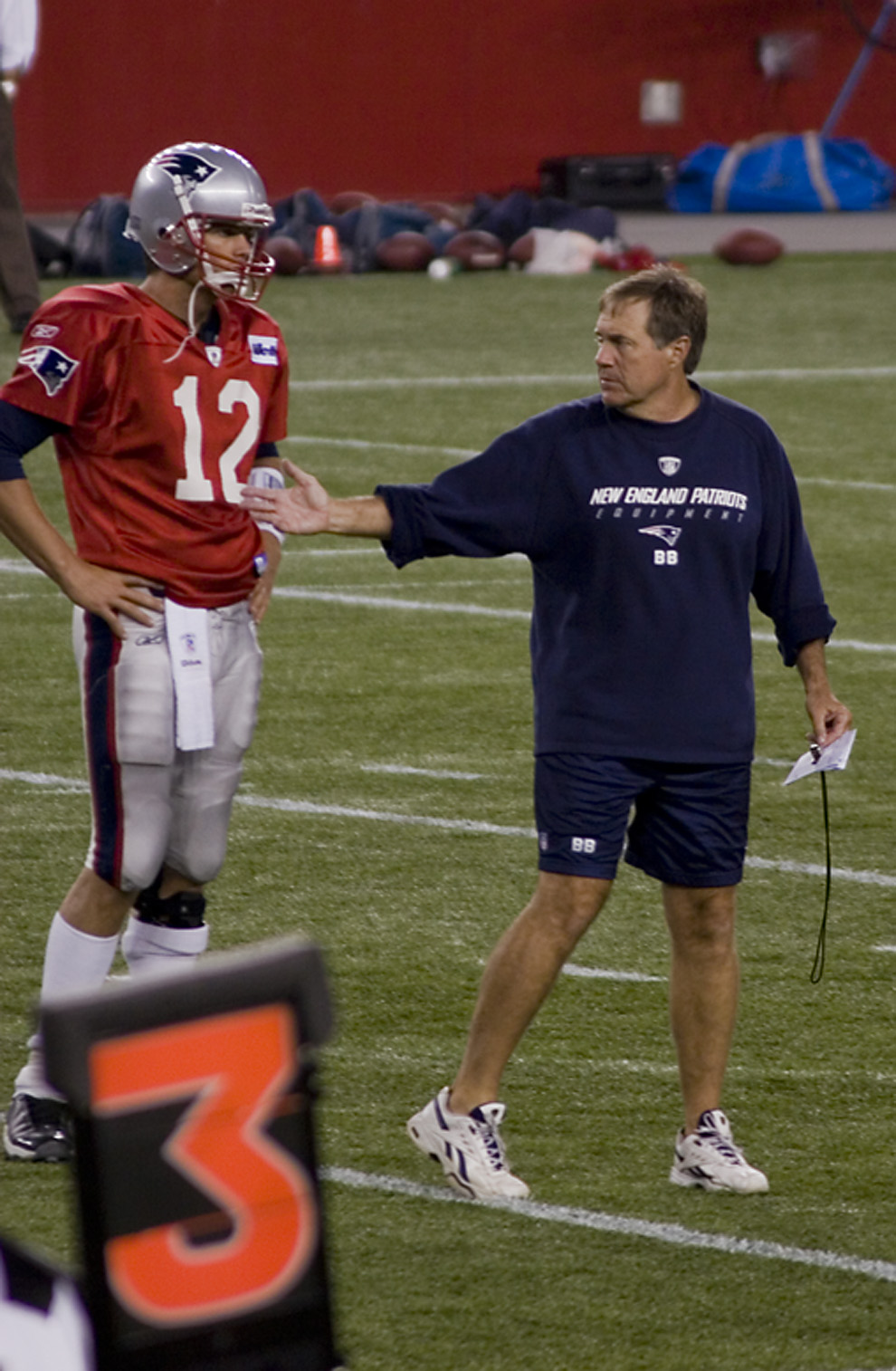
Quarterback Tom Brady and head coach Bill Belichick were the pillars of the Patriots dynasty throughout the 2000s and 2010s. During that period (2001–2019), they led the Patriots to nine Super Bowl appearances, winning six. They are widely regarded as the greatest QB-HC tandem of all time.

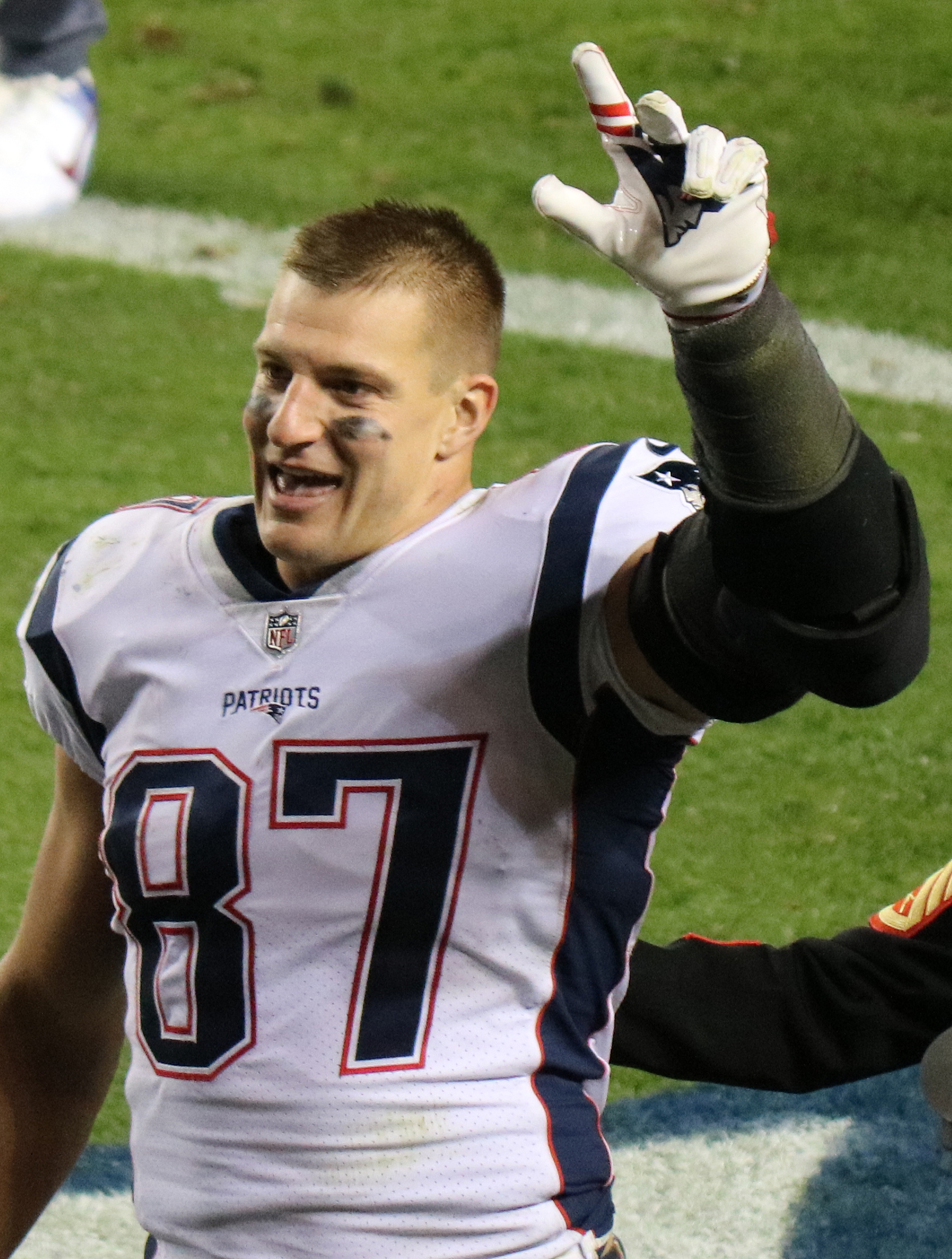
Rob Gronkowski, nicknamed "Gronk", is widely regarded as one of the greatest tight ends of all time. He was a staple of the 2010s offenses.

The Patriots made a pivotal move in 2000 by hiring Bill Belichick as head coach. Belichick, previously a defensive assistant under Parcells and former head coach of the Cleveland Browns (1991–1995), quickly shaped a competitive roster using a combination of veteran free agents, such as linebacker Mike Vrabel and running back Corey Dillon, and high-value draft picks, including linebacker Tedy Bruschi and cornerback Ty Law. Under Belichick, the Patriots became one of the most consistently dominant teams in the NFL, with many describing the team as a "dynasty". In 2001, an injury to starting quarterback Drew Bledsoe allowed sixth-round pick Tom Brady to take over the offense, leading the team to a Super Bowl victory over the St. Louis Rams 20–17. Brady would go on to become one of the NFL's top quarterbacks, guiding the Patriots to additional Super Bowl victories in the 2003 season (32–29 over the Carolina Panthers) and the 2004 season (24–21 over the Philadelphia Eagles). Their new home field, Gillette Stadium, opened in 2002 to replace the aging Foxboro Stadium.

Before the 2007 season, New England acquired All-Pro wide receiver Randy Moss, and the team set numerous offensive records while completing a perfect 16–0 regular season. However, they were upset by the New York Giants in Super Bowl XLII 17–14. That season was also marked by the "Spygate" controversy, in which the Patriots were penalized for videotaping the New York Jets sideline signals, resulting in fines for both Belichick and the team and the loss of a draft pick. Brady missed most of the 2008 season due to injury, and the team failed to make the playoffs despite an 11–5 record, but they returned to division-winning form in 2009. Moss was traded in 2010, yet the team remained among the league's highest-scoring offenses behind Brady, wide receiver Wes Welker, and tight end Rob Gronkowski, finishing with the AFC's best record in both 2010 and 2011, and reaching a Super Bowl rematch with the Giants, which they lost again 21–17.

The Patriots continued to perform at a high level through the mid-2010s, recording 12–4 seasons and AFC championship appearances in 2012 and 2013. In 2014, New England again won 12 games and posted the best record in the AFC en route to winning a conference championship. They won Super Bowl XLIX against the Seattle Seahawks 28–24, though the season was later associated with the "Deflategate" controversy, resulting in a suspension for Brady and penalties for the team. In 2015, New England won another division title but fell in the AFC championship game. The following season, the Patriots went an NFL-best 14–2 and cruised through the postseason en route to another AFC championship. In Super Bowl LI, New England overcame a 25-point deficit against the Atlanta Falcons—the largest comeback in Super Bowl history—to secure their fifth championship, 34–28 in overtime.

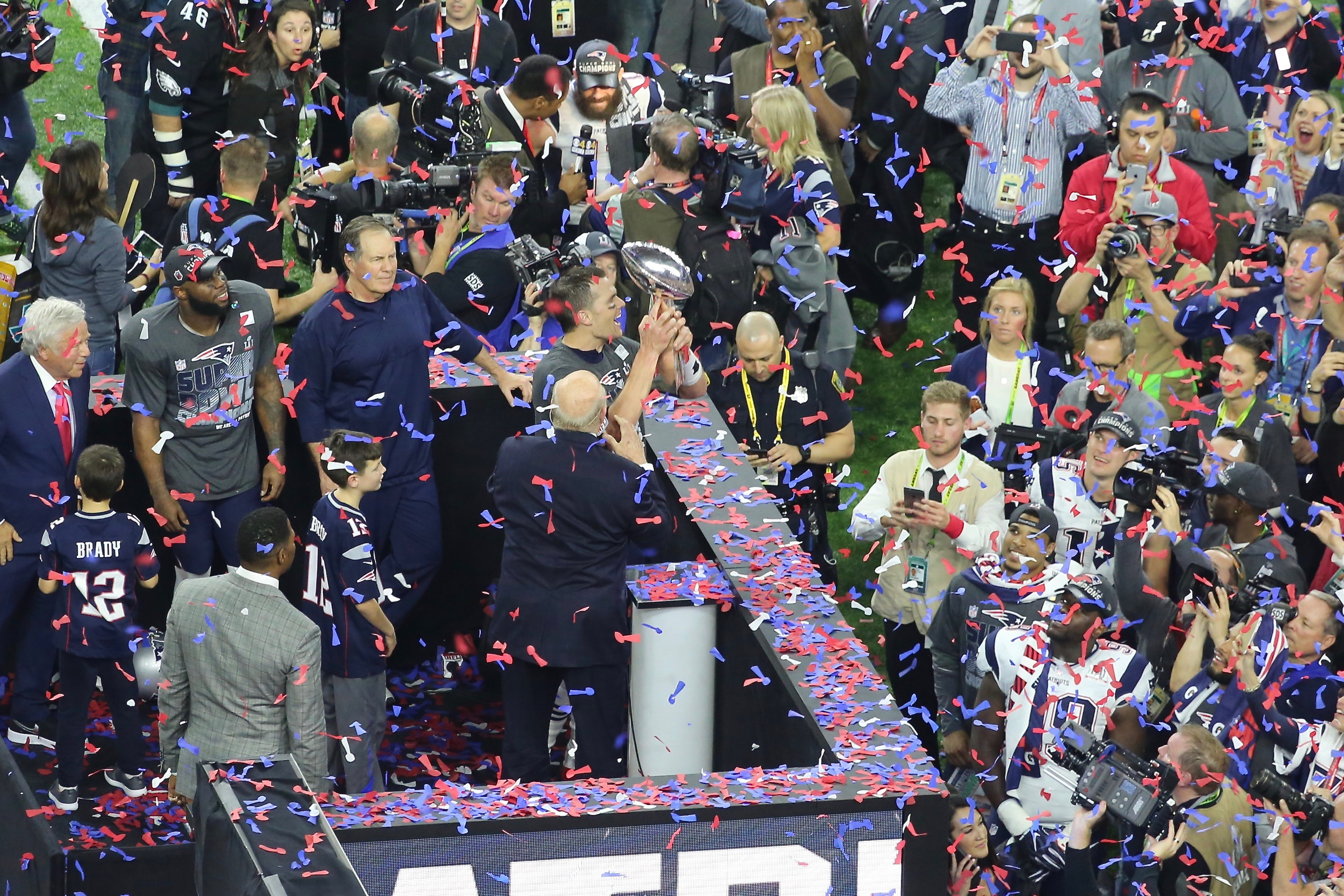
Tom Brady is seen celebrating the team's dramatic comeback victory over the Atlanta Falcons in Super Bowl LI

In 2017, the team went 13–3, advanced to Super Bowl LII, and lost narrowly to the Philadelphia Eagles 41–33, marking their fifth Super Bowl loss. New England continued its dominance in 2018, earning the second seed in the AFC playoffs. After a convincing victory in the divisional round, the Patriots won a roller-coaster AFC championship game over the Kansas City Chiefs to qualify for a third straight Super Bowl. They defeated the Los Angeles Rams 13–3, in the lowest-scoring Super Bowl game in history, securing their sixth title and tying the Pittsburgh Steelers for the most Super Bowl victories in NFL history. In 2019, the Patriots extended their streak of consecutive AFC East titles to 11, but were eliminated in the first round of the playoffs. In March 2020, Brady departed the team in free agency to join the Tampa Bay Buccaneers.

=== Post-Brady era (2019–present) ===
Following Tom Brady's departure, the Patriots posted a losing record in 2020 and missed the playoffs for the first time since 2008. The team declined further in 2023, finishing 4–13, after which Belichick parted ways with the organization. In the 2024 NFL draft, the Patriots selected quarterback Drake Maye, but the team struggled again, finishing 4–13. Head coach Jerod Mayo was subsequently replaced by Mike Vrabel. Under Vrabel, New England experienced a dramatic turnaround in 2025, finishing 14–3 and winning the AFC East. The 10-game improvement matched an NFL record. The Patriots defeated the Denver Broncos, 10–7, in the AFC Championship Game to advance to Super Bowl LX, but lost to the Seattle Seahawks, 29–13.

== Logos and uniforms ==
=== Primary logos ===
The Patriots' primary logo used in the Sullivan era from 1961 to 1992, known as "Pat Patriot". Today, it is kept as a secondary logo, complementing the modern logo, the "Flying Elvis".

The Patriots' primary logo used since 1993, known as the "Flying Elvis". The only alteration since 1993 was the blue being darkened in 2000.

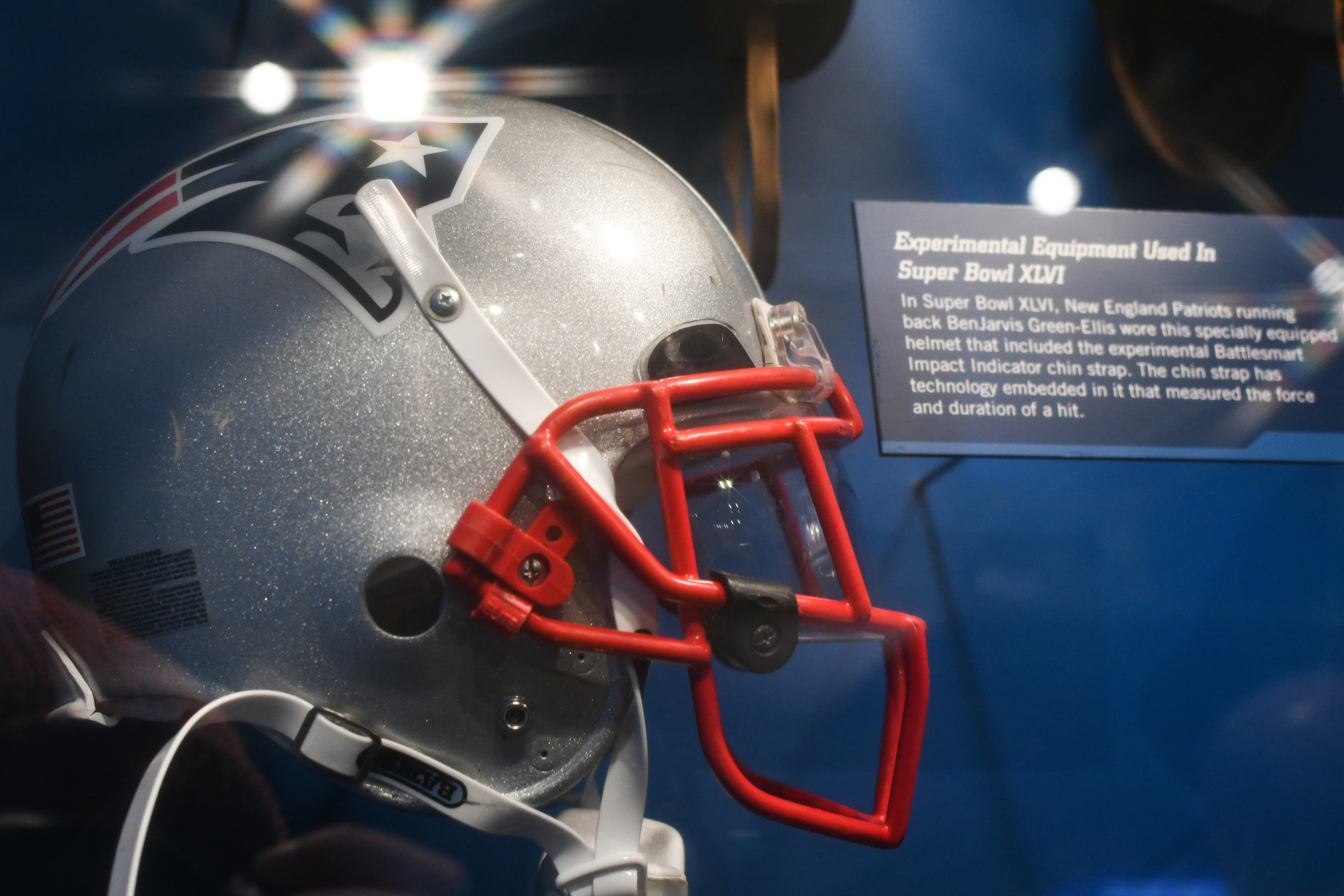
The Patriots' helmet since 2000 (displayed at the Pro Football Hall of Fame)

The Patriots original helmet logo was a simple tricorne hat, used only for the 1960 season. From 1961 to 1992, the Patriots used a logo of a Revolutionary War minuteman hiking a football. The Patriots wordmark logo during this time consisted of a western-style font. The minuteman logo became known as the "Pat Patriot" logo, which later became the name of the team's mascot.

In 1979, the Patriots worked with NFL Properties to design a new, streamlined logo, to replace the complex Pat Patriot logo. The new logo featured the blue and white profile of a minuteman in a tricorne hat set against a flag showing three red stripes separated by two white stripes. Team owner Billy Sullivan decided to put the new logo up to a vote against Pat Patriot with the fans at the September 23 home game against the San Diego Chargers, using a sound level meter to judge the crowd's reaction. The new logo was decidedly rejected by the crowd in favor of Pat, and the concept was shelved.

In 1993, a new logo was unveiled involving the gray face of a minuteman wearing a red, white and royal blue hat that begins as a tricorne and transitions into a flowing banner-like design. It became popularly known as the "Flying Elvis" due to many observing its resemblance to the profile of a young Elvis Presley. A new script logo was introduced as well in tandem with the "Flying Elvis", utilizing a cursive font.

In 2000, the blue color used on the tricorne of the "Flying Elvis" as well as the outline of the cursive wordmark was switched from royal blue to nautical blue to coincide with the uniform change in the new millennium.

On July 3, 2013, the Patriots unveiled a new wordmark to accompany the "Flying Elvis", which replaced the script of their previous cursive typeface with modernized block letters (colored in blue or white depending on the background), and modified the "Flying Elvis" to be underneath instead of flowing up-top. While appearing everywhere else, it was not applied on the uniforms until the 2015 season due to NFL uniform policies.

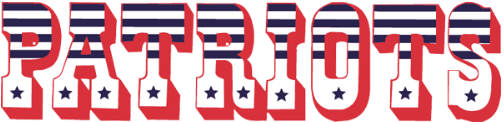
The Patriots' wordmark used in the Sullivan era between 1960 and 1992.

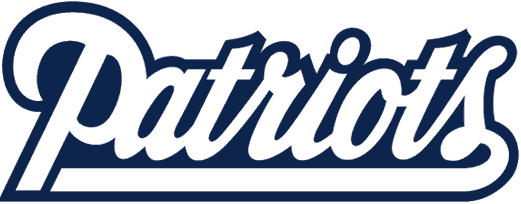
The Patriots' wordmark used from 1993 to 2013, with the blue darkened in 2000. A version with the "Flying Elvis" attached to the top of the capital "P" was frequently used.

=== Uniforms ===
==== 1960–1992 ====
The uniforms worn by the Patriots in the Sullivan era from 1960 to 1992, with variations in the striping throughout the years in the shoulders and sleeves.

The Patriots' primary uniforms remained largely unchanged from the franchises' inaugural season until 1993. The Patriots originally wore red jerseys with white block numbering at home, and white jerseys with red block numbering on the road. Both uniforms used white pants and white helmets, first with the hat logo over the player's number, then with the "Pat Patriot" logo starting in 1961. A blue stripe was added to the two red helmet stripes in 1964. The numbers on both the home and away jerseys gained a blue outline in 1973. In 1979, the Patriots began the first of many sporadic runs of wearing red pants with the white jerseys. The red pants were dropped in 1981, but returned in 1984. After being dropped again in 1988, they were used again from 1990 to 1992.

==== 1993–1999 ====
The uniforms worn by the Patriots in the early Kraft era from 1995 to 1999.

The Patriots underwent a complete identity overhaul before the 1993 season, starting with the introduction of the aforementioned "Flying Elvis" logo. The new uniforms consisted of a royal blue home jersey and a white away jersey. The helmet was silver with the Flying Elvis logo and no additional striping. Both uniforms used silver pants, originally with stripes designed to look like those flowing from the Flying Elvis, but these were changed to simple red and blue stripes after one season. When they debuted, both the home and away jerseys used red block numbers with a blue and white outline, but after one season the home uniforms switched to the now-familiar white with a red outline.

In 1995, the Patriots switched the block numbers to a more modern rounded number font with a dropshadow. The Patriots were one of the first adopters of custom numbers, a trend that would grow drastically over the next 20 years. Along with the new number font, the Flying Elvis logos were moved from the sleeves to the shoulders.

==== 2000–2019 ====
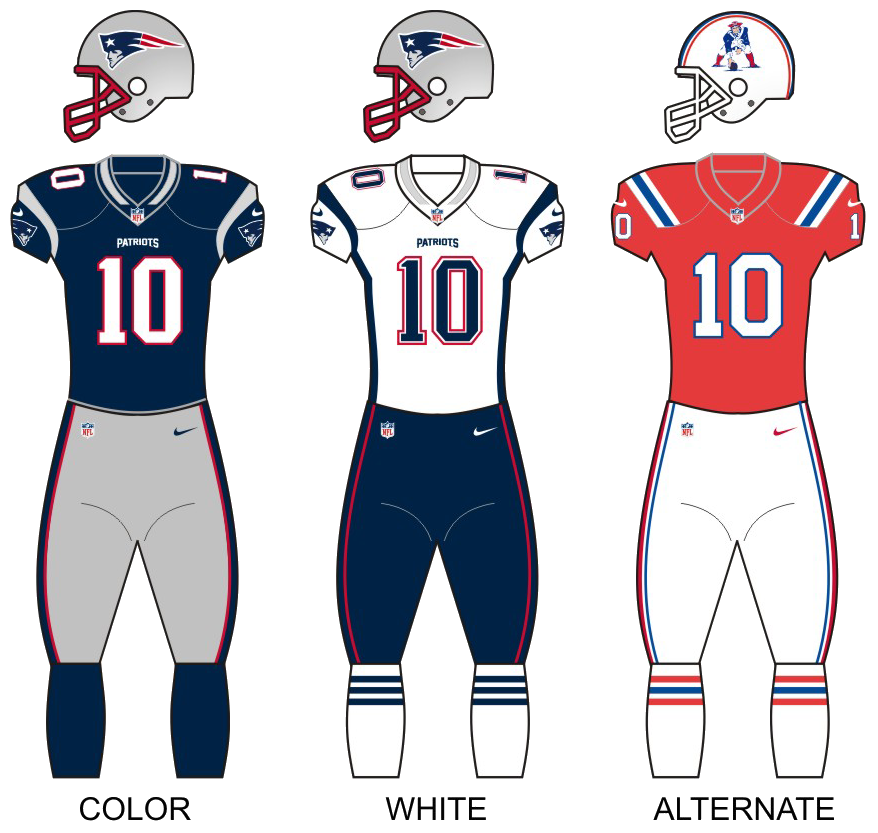
The primary uniforms worn by the Patriots in the dynasty era from 2000 to 2019.

In 2000, the Patriots then became one of the few teams at the time to drop the rounded numbers and switch back to block numbers. The shade of blue was switched for the first time in the franchises' history, from royal to nautical blue. The jerseys once again had the number on the shoulders while the logo moved back to the sleeves. "New Century" silver stripes were also added to the home jersey, with nautical blue stripes appearing on the away jersey. The Patriots, unsatisfied with the 1990s white-on-silver road look, also took the opportunity to introduce blue pants to be worn with the white jersey, offering a better contrast. To better match the blue pants, the number on the white jersey was switched from red to blue.

Though the Patriots had generally worn silver pants with the blue jerseys, and navy pants with the white jerseys, they did wear an all-blue set during the 2002 season. On two consecutive home games that season, the Patriots wore blue tops with their road blue pants and white socks; they lost both games (Week 6 vs. the Packers, and Week 8 vs. the Broncos). The team would not wear an all-blue set again until the introduction of the Color Rush uniforms in 2016.

Throughout the 2011 season, the Patriots wore dark patches with white lettering on their uniforms with the initials 'MHK' in honor of Myra Kraft, the late long-time spouse of owner Robert Kraft.

==== 2020–present ====
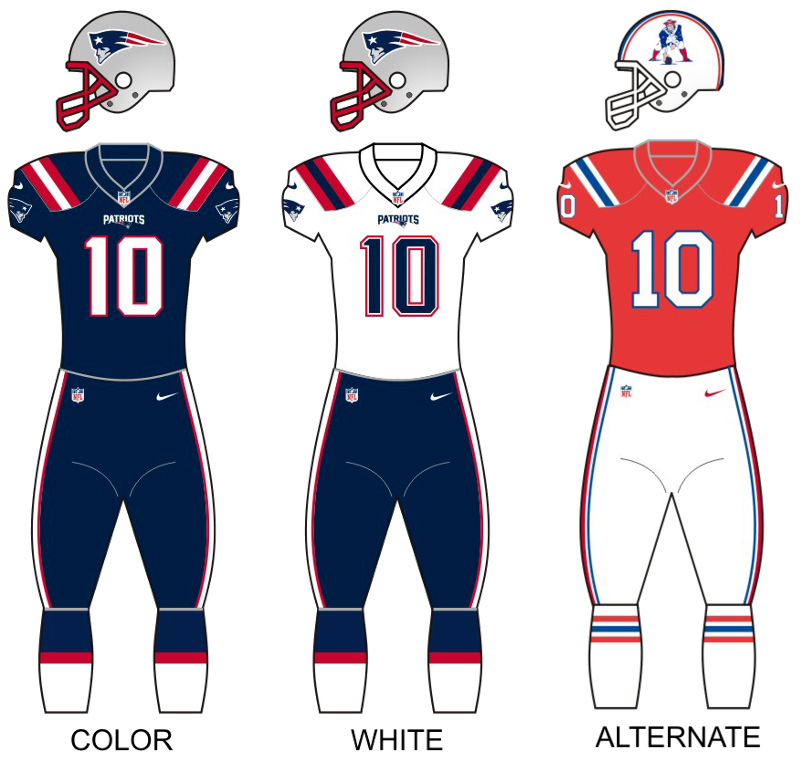
The primary uniforms worn by the Patriots in the post-dynasty era from 2020–present. Silver pants were introduced in 2024, and white pants the following year.

In 2020, the Patriots made some changes to their uniform. The all-blue "Color Rush" design became the primary home uniform, complete with a tweaked nameplate font and numbers, and blue/red/white socks. A corresponding white uniform was also unveiled, also paired with the blue pants. Both uniforms featured truncated shoulder striping as a nod to the "Pat Patriot" uniforms. Coincidentally, the arrival of new jerseys occurred with the departure of long-time quarterback, Tom Brady, from the Patriots. Brady was in New England exactly between the last uniform change in 2000, and left before the 2020 uniform change in 2019.

The Patriots brought back the silver pants to pair with the current uniforms in a 2022 Week 7 home game on Monday Night Football against the Chicago Bears. Unlike the previous silver pants the team wore from 2000 to 2019, this design featured thicker red stripes, matching the same width as the middle blue stripe. During a 2024 Week 7 road game at Wembley Stadium against the Jacksonville Jaguars, the Patriots paired their silver pants with the road white uniform for the first time since 1999. After their largest victory of the 2024 season in a Week 10 road game dressed again in the silver pants with the road white uniform, the Patriots quietly promoted the silver pants to full-time use with both the home and road uniform for the rest of the season.

For the Patriots' 2025 Week 6 road game at the New Orleans Saints, they reintroduced white pants to the primary uniform rotation, wearing them with the road white uniform. The Patriots last wore an all-white kit in 2017. Like with the silver pants, the white pants feature red-blue-red side stripes. After going 6–0 in the white-over-white look, the Patriots opted to wear the white pants and white jerseys in Super Bowl LX.

==== Alternate uniforms ====
In 1994, the Patriots wore the "Pat Patriot" helmets and plain white striped pants from two seasons earlier as alternates as part of the NFL's 75th-anniversary celebration. In 2002, NFL teams were allowed to add a permanent third jersey to be worn in a maximum of two games. The Patriots reintroduced a red jersey as their alternate, complemented with the old-style "Pat Patriot" helmet. In 2003, the Patriots changed their alternate to a silver jersey with blue pants. For this uniform, the "Flying Elvis" helmet was used. The uniform was identical to the white jersey with any areas of white replaced by silver. These uniforms were dropped after 2007. No alternate uniform was used in 2008. In 2009, the red alternate was reintroduced, again accompanied by the "Pat Patriot" helmet. An alternate white road jersey was also worn with the older helmet for one game, using red numbers, in tribute to the 50th anniversary of the AFL. The red alternate gained a blue outline around the numbers in 2010 and this was worn through 2012. The Patriots temporarily retired their alternate red uniforms in 2013, due to a new NFL rule outlawing throwback alternate helmets, and restricting teams to one helmet shell only. However, after the NFL reinstated the use of alternate helmets in 2022, the Patriots brought back the throwback red uniforms.

In 2016, the Patriots took part in the NFL's Color Rush program, wearing monochrome navy uniforms on September 22 against the Houston Texans. The uniform tops were patterned after the 1980s Pat Patriot-era uniforms, while the pants featured thick white stripes with red accents. They wore them a total of four times from 2016 to 2019, and were the basis of the team's current primary uniforms. In 2017, an all-white Color Rush uniform was introduced and used for the Patriots' Thursday night road game against the Tampa Bay Buccaneers.

In 2025, the Patriots unveiled a "Rivalries" uniform that would be worn at home against each of their AFC East opponents over a three-year period. Dubbed the "Nor'easter", the design featured a Storm Blue base with white and navy shoulder stripes, italicized white numbers with navy drop shadows, and a new "NE" logo on the sleeves. Six red stars along the neckline represent each of New England's six states. The uniform is worn with white pants and helmets, which featured a silver-trimmed "Flying Elvis" decal without red accents.

== Facilities ==
=== Stadium and headquarters ===
==== History ====
Stadium	Location	Duration
Boston University Field	Boston, Massachusetts	1960–1962
Fenway Park	Boston, Massachusetts	1963–1968
Alumni Stadium	Chestnut Hill, Massachusetts	1969
Harvard Stadium	Allston, Massachusetts	1970
Foxboro Stadium	Foxborough, Massachusetts	1971–2001
Gillette Stadium	Foxborough, Massachusetts	2002–present

Since 2002, the Patriots' home stadium has been Gillette Stadium, located 22 miles outside Boston in Foxborough, Massachusetts. A $350 million facility privately financed by Robert Kraft, it houses the team's practice facilities, administrative offices, and its owning entity The Kraft Group, as well as the Kraft-owned Major League Soccer team, the New England Revolution. The field's natural grass was replaced with a FieldTurf surface during the 2006 season. The Patriots installed a new video board, the largest in the United States, in 2023. Gillette Stadium has hosted more postseason games than any other venue except Candlestick Park's 27. The Patriots had a 21–4 playoff record in this stadium after the 2025 NFL season. Beginning in 2007, the area around the stadium was developed into a $375 million "lifestyle and entertainment center" called Patriot Place; among its largest structures is a multi-floor restaurant and bar called CBS Scene. The stadium was originally known as CMGI Field, after an internet company based in Andover, Massachusetts, before the naming rights were bought by Gillette after the "dot-com" bust.

In 1960, the team established its first dedicated administrative front offices at 522 Commonwealth Avenue in Kenmore Square, Boston. In 1965, the club offices were relocated closer to their primary home field at Fenway Park, moving to 78 Lansdowne Street. During their first decade in the American Football League (AFL), the franchise did not own a stadium and frequently rotated through various collegiate and professional venues in Greater Boston due to scheduling conflicts and lease limitations.

Following the rejection of a $16 million stadium proposal in Boston, the Patriots selected Foxborough, in Norfolk County, Massachusetts, as their new home on April 4, 1970, citing superior highway infrastructure and a larger regional population base. Construction on the 62,000-seat Schaefer Stadium began on September 23, 1970, with a construction cost of approximately $6.2 million. The stadium was renamed Sullivan Stadium in 1983. Then in 1990, the name changed to Foxboro Stadium. The final game in this stadium was the 2001 AFC Divisional Playoff game which was a 16–13 overtime win over the visiting Oakland Raiders, known for the raging snowstorm and the "tuck rule" call.

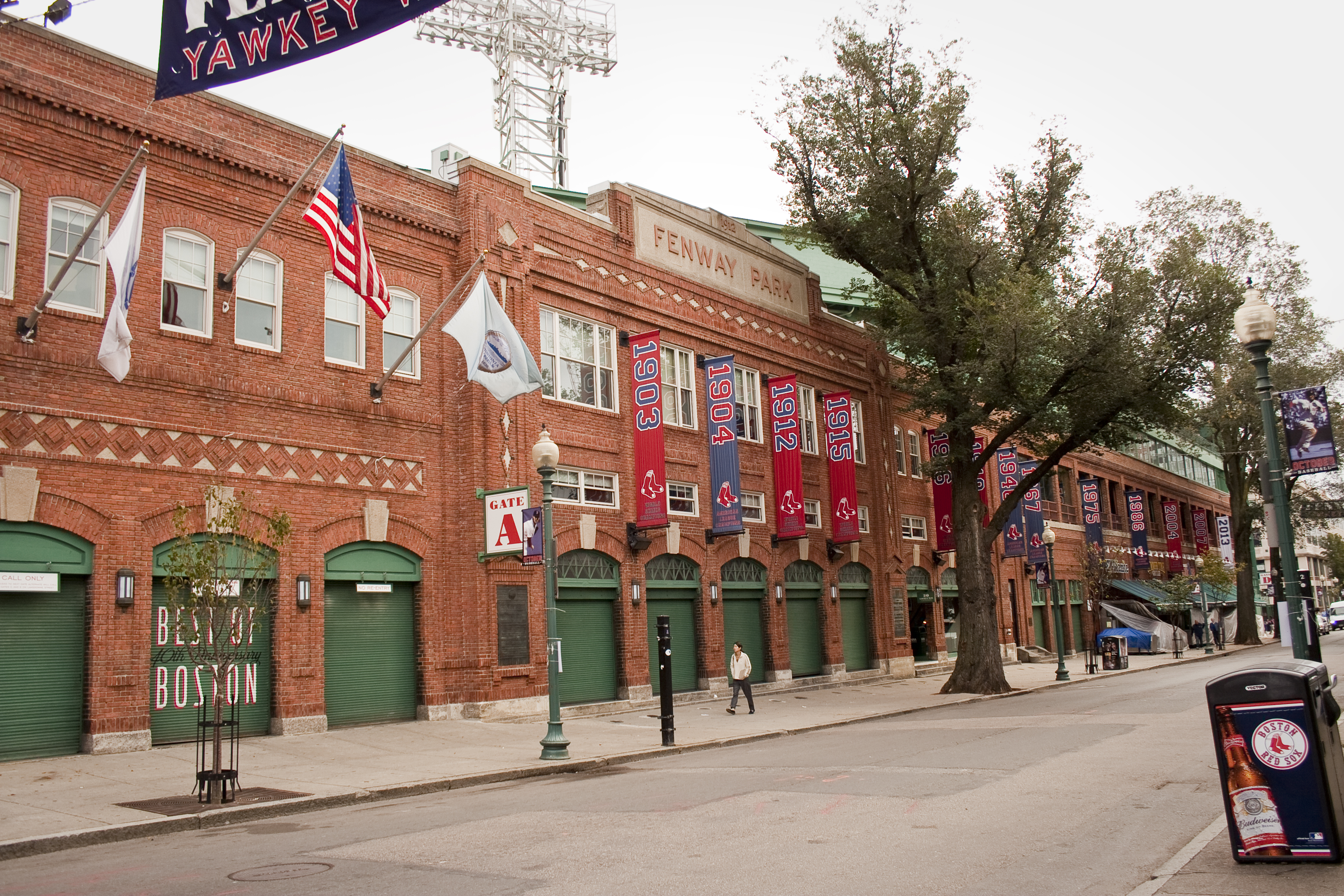
Fenway Park in Boston, Massachusetts, was the home stadium of the Patriots from 1963 to 1968

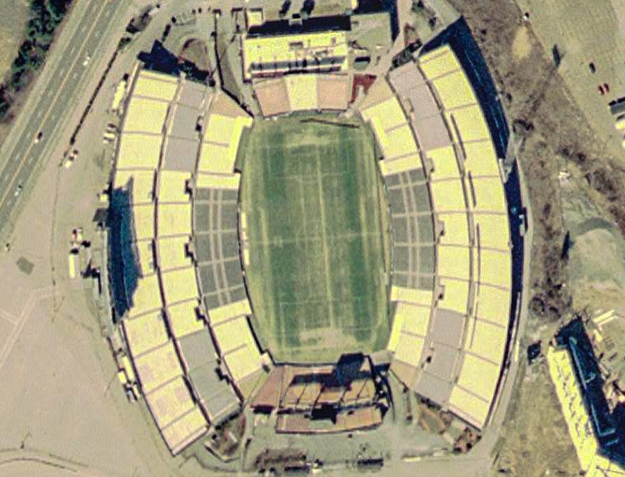
Aerial view of Foxboro Stadium in Foxborough, Massachusetts, where the Patriots played from 1971 to 2001

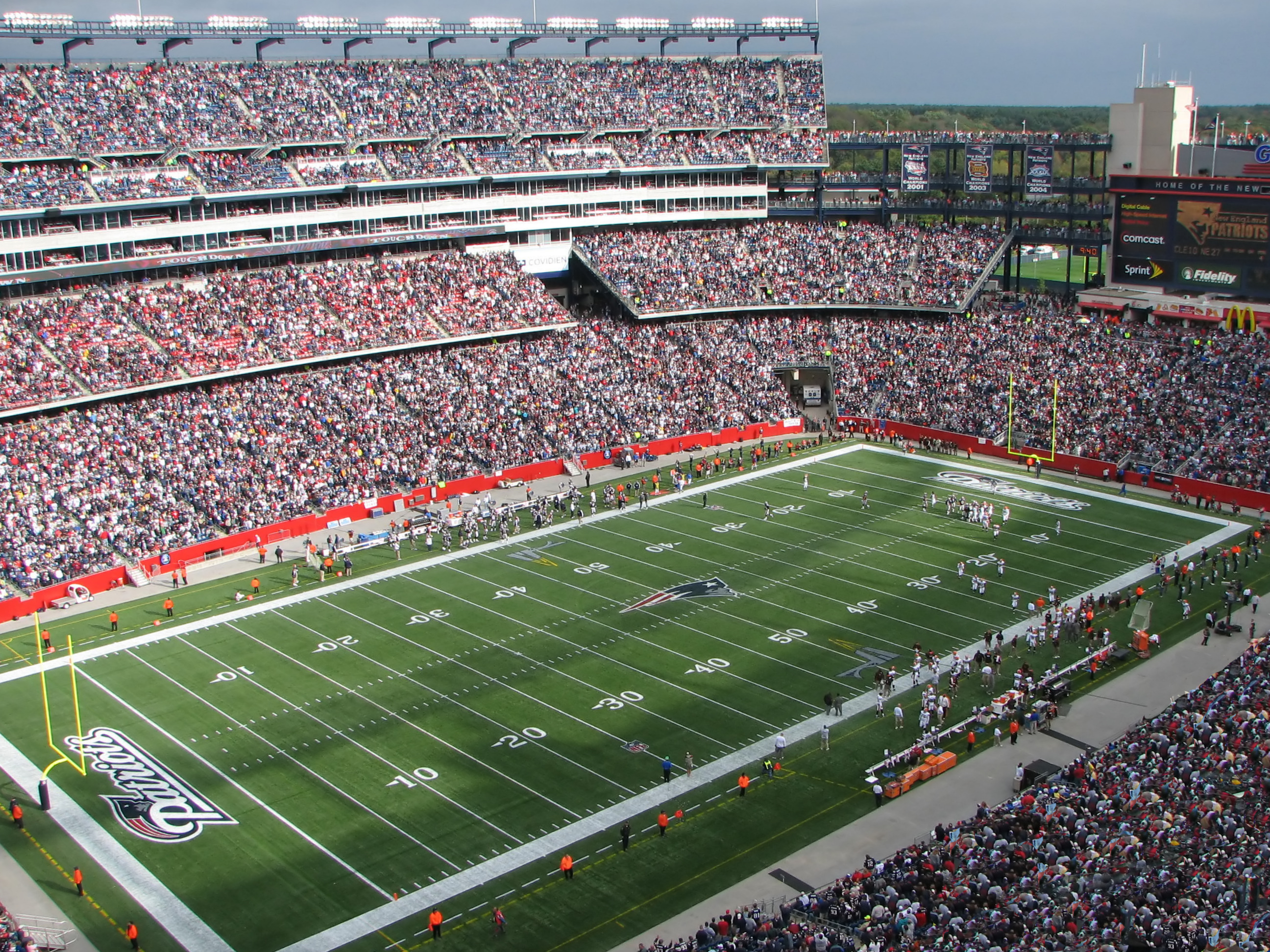
The field of Gillette Stadium, the Foxborough home stadium of the Patriots since 2002

=== Training camp and practice ===
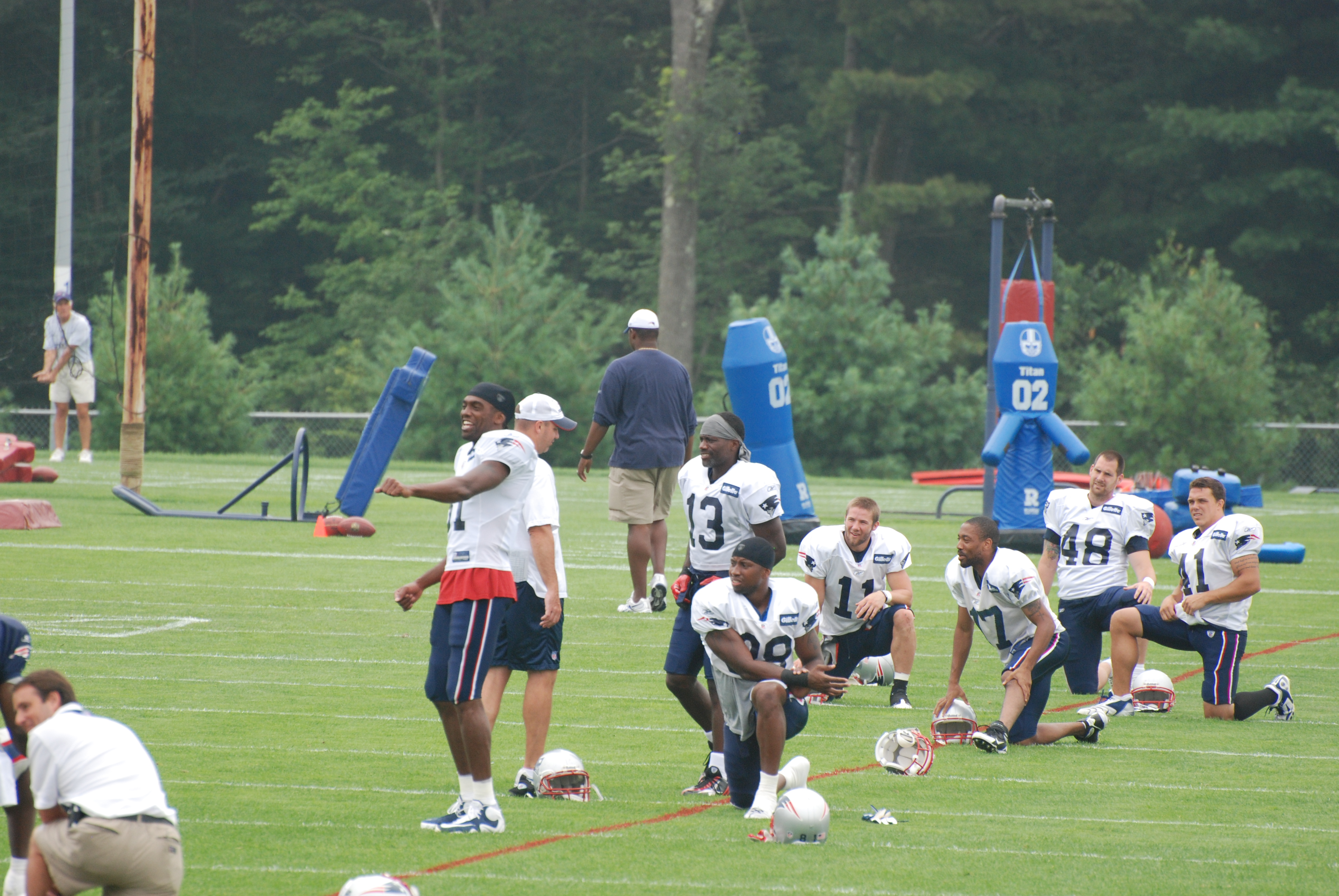
Patriots players during training camp in 2009

The Patriots have held their annual training camp in Foxborough, Massachusetts, since 2003, practicing on the fields adjacent to Gillette Stadium. Prior to this permanent move, the team shifted between various school campuses in Massachusetts and Rhode Island (i.e., Bryant College and the University of Massachusetts Amherst).

=== Aircraft ===
In 2017, the Patriots purchased two Boeing 767-300ERs for use as team planes, with one serving as the backup, which were ready in time for the 2017 NFL season. This made them the first team in league history to own their own planes. At the time it was getting more difficult for professional sports teams to book private charter flights, with eight teams being dropped that season, as major commercial airlines were instead focusing on more profitable scheduled flights. The two jet airliners, N366AA and N39367, were previously operated by American Airlines from 1991 to 2016. The planes are known affectionately as "AirKrafts" after team owner Robert Kraft. Kraft lent one of the planes to transport students to the March for Our Lives demonstration in Washington, D.C. in 2018.

In 2020, the New England Patriots signed an agreement with Eastern Airlines to handle the operations of their planes. In July 2023, the Patriots filed a lawsuit against Eastern Airlines over an alleged breach of contract. Since February 2024, the planes are operated by Omni Air International.

== Rivalries ==
=== Divisional ===
==== New York Jets ====
Both the New York Jets and the Patriots were charter members of the American Football League. Before the Brady-Belichick era, there was general parity between the teams, with the Jets leading the overall series 43–36–1. However, once the Brady-Belichick era began, the Patriots thereafter dominated, now leading 77–56–1, with a record of 41–13 since the turn of the century.

==== Miami Dolphins ====
The Dolphins and Patriots have been division rivals since the Dolphins joined the AFL in 1966. The Dolphins generally dominated the series throughout the 20th century, and despite the success of the Brady-Belichick era, the Dolphins still hold the lead in the series 64–57.

==== Buffalo Bills ====
Like the rest of the current AFC East, the Patriots and Bills were rivals in the AFL, with both teams being charter members of that organization. Like the Jets, the series saw general parity (with the Patriots leading 41–38–1) until the 21st century, when the Patriots took the lead in the series 81–52–1, with a record of 40–14 since the turn of the century.

=== Intraconference ===
==== Indianapolis Colts ====
Although both teams have been rivals since the AFL-NFL merger (Due to them being in the same division before the 2002 realignment) the rivalry greatly intensified in the 2000s when Tom Brady and Peyton Manning emerged as two of the greatest quarterbacks of the decade for the Patriots and Colts respectively, with the teams frequently clashing in the playoffs. The Patriots lead the overall series 53–32.

==== Pittsburgh Steelers ====
The Steelers and Patriots' rise as Super Bowl contenders in the late 1990s and early 2000s has fueled a rivalry between the two teams, with the teams experiencing several playoff showdowns, such as the AFC Championship in 2001 and 2016. The Patriots currently lead the series 20–17.

==== Baltimore Ravens ====
The Ravens and the Patriots developed a rivalry with several playoff meetings in the late 2000s and 2010s. The Patriots lead the overall series 12–5, although both teams have beaten each other twice in the playoffs.

==== Denver Broncos ====
The Broncos and Patriots have met multiple times in the playoffs, though their rivalry was intensified when Peyton Manning joined the Broncos, with Brady and Manning facing off in the playoffs for the last time during the Broncos' Super Bowl winning season in 2015. Denver currently leads the series 31–25.

=== Interconference ===
==== New York Giants ====
While the teams had been rivals prior, the Patriots' and Giants' matchups in Super Bowl XLII and Super Bowl XLVI has greatly intensified the rivalry between the two teams, particularly between quarterbacks Tom Brady and Eli Manning. the Patriots lead the overall series 8–7.

== Championships ==
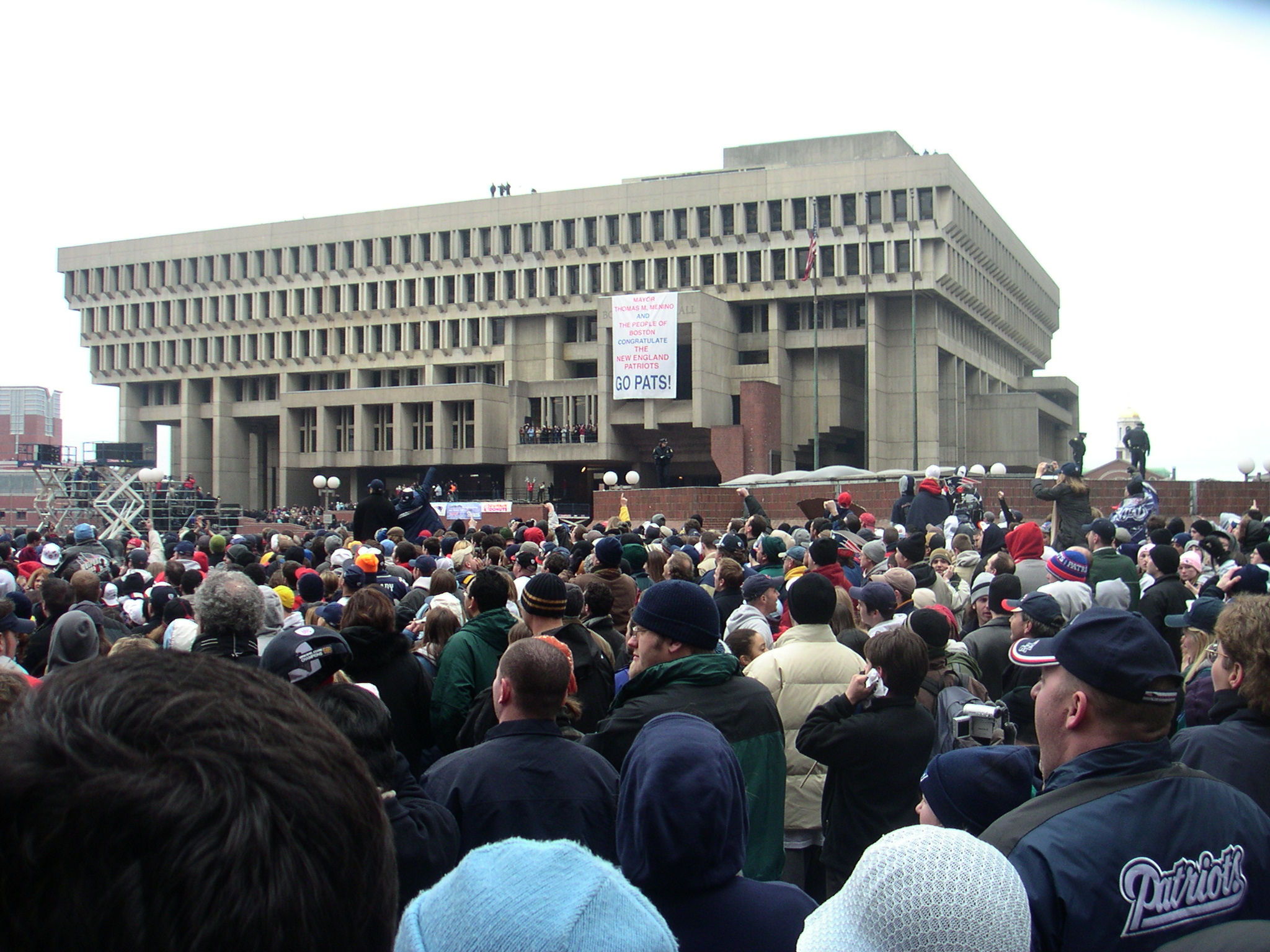
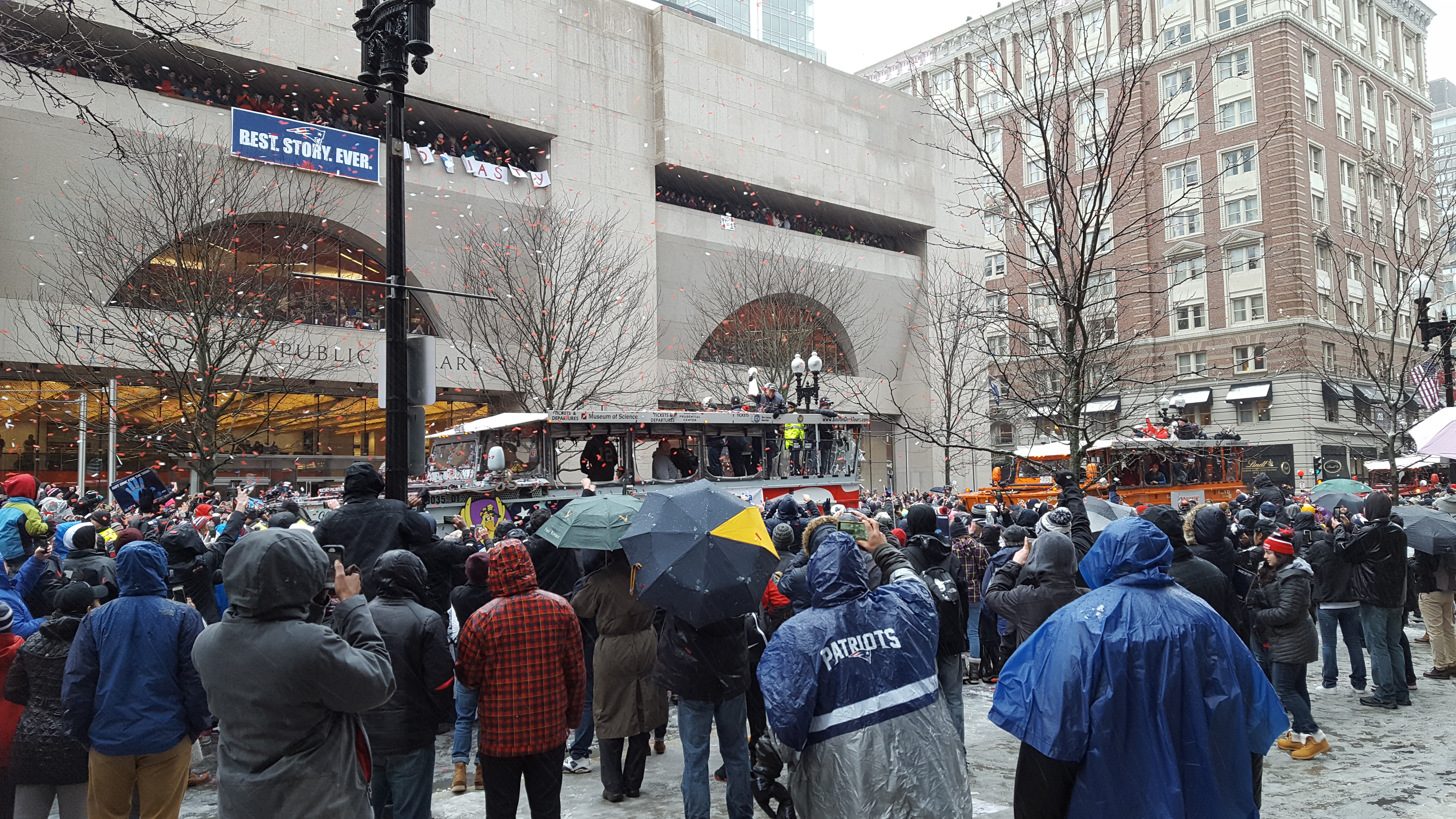
Patriots fans rallying in celebration of the team's Super Bowl XXXVIII championship in front of Boston City Hall in 2004 (left). Patriots fans in attendance for the victory parade of Super Bowl LI on Boylston St., Boston in 2017 (right).

=== Super Bowl championships ===
The New England Patriots have won six Super Bowls, the league championship of the NFL. The franchise is tied for the most all-time with the Pittsburgh Steelers. The team repeated as champions between the 2003 and 2004 NFL seasons, they are only among eight NFL franchises to accomplish the feat. Between 2001 and 2004, the Patriots became the second team in NFL history to win three Super Bowls in four years (2001, 2003, and 2004).

Year	Coach	Super Bowl	Location	Opponent	Score	Record
2001	Bill Belichick	XXXVI	Louisiana Superdome (New Orleans)	St. Louis Rams	20–17	11–5
2003	Bill Belichick	XXXVIII	Reliant Stadium (Houston)	Carolina Panthers	32–29	14–2
2004	Bill Belichick	XXXIX	Alltel Stadium (Jacksonville)	Philadelphia Eagles	24–21	14–2
2014	Bill Belichick	XLIX	University of Phoenix Stadium (Glendale)	Seattle Seahawks	28–24	12–4
2016	Bill Belichick	LI	NRG Stadium (Houston)	Atlanta Falcons	34–28 (OT)	14–2
2018	Bill Belichick	LIII	Mercedes-Benz Stadium (Atlanta)	Los Angeles Rams	13–3	11–5
Total Super Bowls won:					6	

=== AFC championships ===
The Patriots have won twelve AFC Championships, the record for the most conference championships all-time in the NFL.

Year	Coach	Location	Opponent	Score	Record
1985	Raymond Berry	Miami Orange Bowl (Miami)	Miami Dolphins	31–14	11–5
1996	Bill Parcells	Foxboro Stadium (Foxborough)	Jacksonville Jaguars	20–6	11–5
2001	Bill Belichick	Heinz Field (Pittsburgh)	Pittsburgh Steelers	24–17	11–5
2003	Bill Belichick	Gillette Stadium (Foxborough)	Indianapolis Colts	23–20	14–2
2004	Bill Belichick	Heinz Field (Pittsburgh)	Pittsburgh Steelers	41–27	14–2
2007	Bill Belichick	Gillette Stadium (Foxborough)	San Diego Chargers	21–12	16–0
2011	Bill Belichick	Gillette Stadium (Foxborough)	Baltimore Ravens	23–20	13–3
2014	Bill Belichick	Gillette Stadium (Foxborough)	Indianapolis Colts	45–7	12–4
2016	Bill Belichick	Gillette Stadium (Foxborough)	Pittsburgh Steelers	36–17	14–2
2017	Bill Belichick	Gillette Stadium (Foxborough)	Jacksonville Jaguars	24–20	13–3
2018	Bill Belichick	Arrowhead Stadium (Kansas City)	Kansas City Chiefs	37–31 (OT)	11–5
2025	Mike Vrabel	Empower Field at Mile High (Denver)	Denver Broncos	10–7	14–3
Total AFC Championships won:				12	

=== Division championships ===
The Patriots have won 23 division championships, which is second place for the most all-time behind the Pittsburgh Steelers and Dallas Cowboys, who are tied in first with 24. One of these divisional titles was won in the AFL in the AFL East (1963), the rest were won in the AFC East of the NFL.

Year	Coach	Record
1963	Mike Holovak	7–6–1
1978	Chuck Fairbanks	11–5
1986	Raymond Berry	11–5
1996	Bill Parcells	11–5
1997	Pete Carroll	10–6
2001	Bill Belichick	11–5
2003	Bill Belichick	14–2
2004	Bill Belichick	14–2
2005	Bill Belichick	10–6
2006	Bill Belichick	12–4
2007	Bill Belichick	16–0
2009	Bill Belichick	10–6
2010	Bill Belichick	14–2
2011	Bill Belichick	13–3
2012	Bill Belichick	12–4
2013	Bill Belichick	12–4
2014	Bill Belichick	12–4
2015	Bill Belichick	12–4
2016	Bill Belichick	14–2
2017	Bill Belichick	13–3
2018	Bill Belichick	11–5
2019	Bill Belichick	12–4
2025	Mike Vrabel	14–3
Total Division Championships won:		23

== Statistics, records, and awards ==
=== Season-by-season results ===
This is a partial list of the Patriots' last six completed seasons.

Note: The finish, wins, losses, and ties columns list regular season results and exclude any postseason play.

**Super Bowl champions**	**Conference champions**	**Division champions**	**Wild Card berth**

As of March 1, 2026

Season	Team	League	Conference	Division	Regular season				Postseason results	Awards
Season	Team	League	Conference	Division	Finish	Wins	Losses	Ties	Postseason results	Awards
2020	2020	NFL	AFC	East	3rd	7	9	0	—	—
2021	2021	NFL	AFC	East	2nd	10	7	0	Lost Wild Card Playoffs (Bills) 17-47	—
2022	2022	NFL	AFC	East	3rd	8	9	0	—	—
2023	2023	NFL	AFC	East	4th	4	13	0	—	—
2024	2024	NFL	AFC	East	4th	4	13	0	—	—
2025	2025	NFL	AFC	East	1st	14	3	0	Lost Super Bowl LX (vs. Seahawks) 13–29	—

=== All-time leaders ===
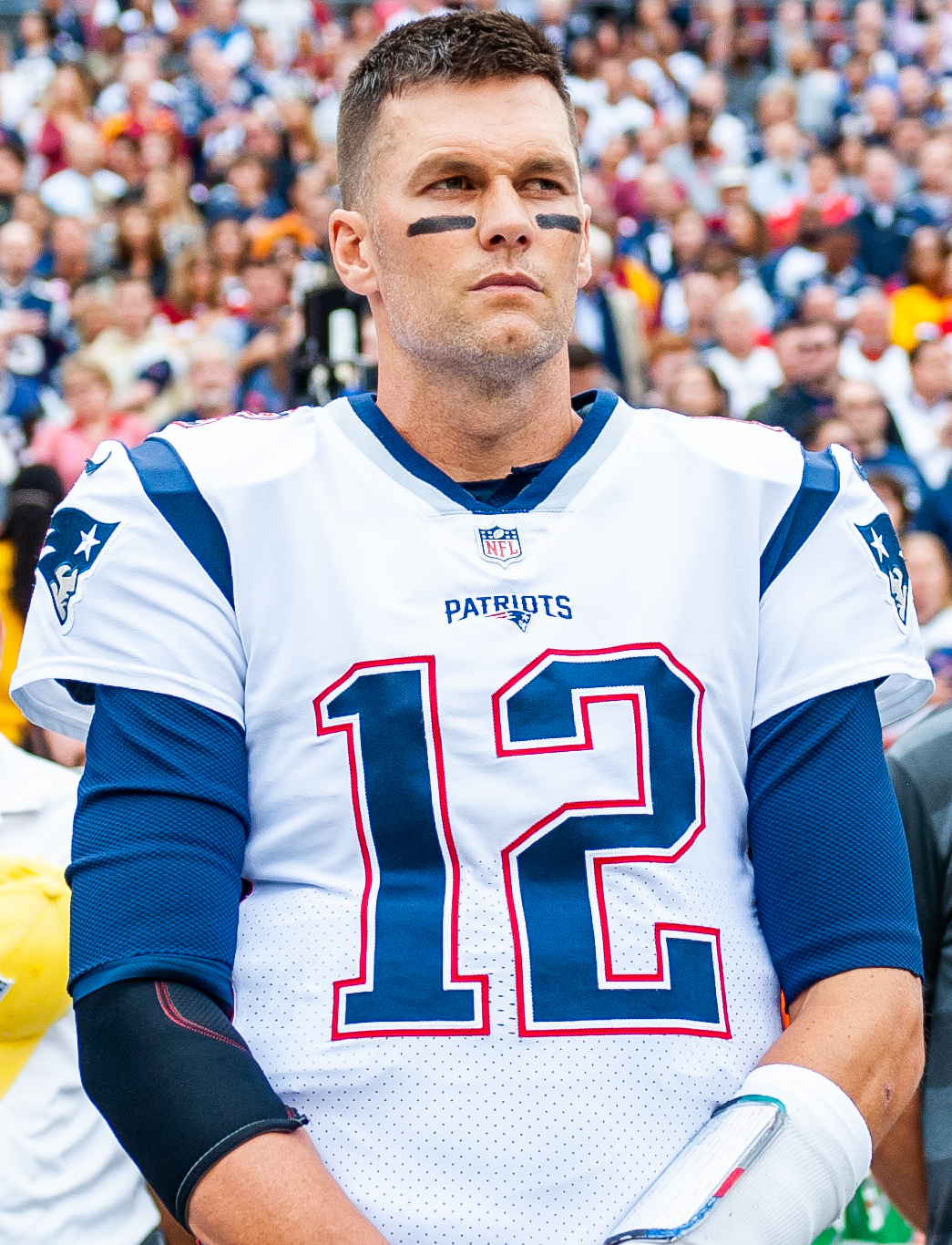
Widely regarded as the greatest quarterback of all time, Tom Brady is the longest tenured and most decorated player in franchise history.

All-time Patriots leaders
Leader	Name	Record number	Tenure
Passing	Tom Brady	74,571 passing yards	2000–2019
Rushing	Sam Cunningham	5,453 rushing yards	1973–1982
Receiving	Stanley Morgan	10,352 receiving yards	1977–1989
Scoring	Stephen Gostkowski	1,775 points	2006–2019
Sacks	Andre Tippett	100.0 sacks	1982–1993
Interceptions	Raymond Clayborn	36 interceptions	1977–1989
Interceptions	Ty Law	36 interceptions	1995–2004
Coaching wins	Bill Belichick	266 wins	2000–2023

=== Individual awards ===
Patriots have received league honorific awards from the Associated Press, except for the NFL's Super Bowl MVP and the Pro Football Writers of America's Executive of the Year. Seasons in which the AFL counterparts of the awards were won (1960–1969) are labeled.

Bold indicates those elected to the Pro Football Hall of Fame.

NFL Most Valuable Player
Season	Player	Position
1964^{(AFL)}	Gino Cappelletti	FL/K
1966^{(AFL)}	Jim Nance	FB
2007	Tom Brady	QB
2010	Tom Brady	QB
2017	Tom Brady	QB

NFL Offensive Player of the Year
Season	Player	Position
2007	Tom Brady	QB
2010	Tom Brady	QB

NFL Defensive Player of the Year
Season	Player	Position
2019	Stephon Gilmore	CB

Super Bowl Most Valuable Player
Super Bowl	Player	Position
XXXVI	Tom Brady	QB
XXXVIII	Tom Brady	QB
XXXIX	Deion Branch	WR
XLIX	Tom Brady	QB
LI	Tom Brady	QB
LIII	Julian Edelman	WR

NFL Offensive Rookie of the Year
Season	Player	Position
1988	John Stephens	RB
1991	Leonard Russell	RB
1995	**Curtis Martin**	RB

NFL Defensive Rookie of the Year
Season	Player	Position
1976	**Mike Haynes**	CB
2008	Jerod Mayo	LB

NFL Comeback Player of the Year
Season	Player	Position
1966^{(AFL)}	Vito "Babe" Parilli	QB
2005	Tedy Bruschi	LB
2009	Tom Brady	QB
2014	Rob Gronkowski	TE

NFL Coach of the Year
Season	Coach
1994	**Bill Parcells**
2003	Bill Belichick
2007	Bill Belichick
2010	Bill Belichick
2025	Mike Vrabel

NFL Executive of the Year
Season	Executive
2003	Scott Pioli
2007	Scott Pioli
2021	Bill Belichick

== Players of note ==
=== Current roster ===
New England Patriots roster
**Quarterbacks (QB)**: 16 Tommy DeVito; 10 Drake Maye; 15 Behren Morton; **Running backs (RB)**: 44 Reggie Gilliam FB; 9 Corey Kiner KR; 34 Lan Larison KR; 38 Rhamondre Stevenson; **Wide receivers (WR)**: 1 A. J. Brown; 86 Efton Chism; 3 DeMario Douglas PR; 13 Mack Hollins; 18 Kyle Williams KR; **Tight ends (TE)**: 85 Hunter Henry; 36 Cameron Latu; 82 Eli Raridon	**Offensive linemen (OL)**: 77 Ben Brown LG; 52 Marcus Bryant LT; 66 Will Campbell LT; 68 Dametrious Crownover LT; 74 Caleb Lomu RT; 76 Morgan Moses RT; 65 Matt Pryor RG; 72 Walter Rouse G; 70 Greg Van Roten G; 55 Jared Wilson C; **Defensive linemen (DL)**: 90 Christian Barmore DT; 94 Cory Durden NT; 92 Joshua Farmer DE; 99 DaQuan Jones NT; 93 Leonard Taylor III DT; 97 Milton Williams DE	**Linebackers (LB)**: 53 Christian Elliss MLB; 49 Erick Hunter MLB; 50 Gabe Jacas OLB; 5 Dre'Mont Jones OLB; 54 Darius Muasau MLB; 48 Namdi Obiazor MLB; 91 Elijah Ponder OLB; 14 Robert Spillane MLB; **Defensive backs (DB)**: 33 Mike Brown SS; 31 Kevin Byard FS; 29 Channing Canada CB; 7 Carlton Davis CB; 0 Christian Gonzalez CB; 25 Marcus Jones CB/PR; 21 Karon Prunty CB; 23 Jaylen Reed FS; 41 Brenden Schooler FS; 22 Charles Woods CB; 4 Craig Woodson SS; **Special teams (ST)**: 47 Julian Ashby LS; 8 Andy Borregales K; 19 Mitch Wishnowsky P	**Practice squad**: 84 Tanner Arkin TE; 81 Chandler Brayboy WR; 80 Tanner Conner TE; 27 Elliott Davison FS; 83 Kyle Dixon WR; 95 Eric Gregory DT; 30 Al'zillion Hamilton CB; 58 Xavier Holmes OLB; 26 Terrell Jennings RB; 61 Lorenz Metz T (IPP); 11 Ryan Miller WR; 35 Elias Neal MLB; 64 Xavier Newman-Johnson C; 98 Jeremiah Pharms Jr. DT; 67 Andrew Rupcich G; 28 Kindle Vildor CB; 42 Benton Whitley OLB; **Reserve**: 87 Romeo Doubs WR (IR); 32 TreVeyon Henderson RB (IR); 80 Julian Hill TE (IR); 45 Quintayvious Hutchins OLB (IR); 59 Khalil Jacobs MLB (IR); 2 Harold Landry OLB (PUP); 39 Myles Montgomery RB (IR); 71 Mike Onwenu G (IR); 24 Dell Pettus SS (IR); 75 Alijah Vera-Tucker G (IR) 53 active, 16 practice squad (1 IPP), 10 reserve As of November 14, 2026. Rookies in italics.; Roster; Depth chart; Transactions

=== Pro Football Hall of Famers ===
The Pro Football Hall of Fame has inducted six players who made their primary contribution to professional football while with the Patriots. The Patriots' total number of Pro Football Hall of Famers is 13 (12 players and one coach).

Notes:

- Hall of Famers who made a major part of their primary contribution for the Patriots are listed in **bold**.
- Hall of Famers who spent only a minor portion of their career with the Patriots are listed in normal font.

New England Patriots in the Pro Football Hall of Fame
Players
No.	Name	Inducted	Position(s)	Tenure
85	**Nick Buoniconti**	2001	LB	1962–1968
73	**John Hannah**	1991	G	1973–1985
40	**Mike Haynes**	1997	CB	1976–1982
24	**Ty Law**	2019	CB	1995–2004
28	Curtis Martin	2012	RB	1995–1997
66	Steve McMichael	2024	DT	1980
81	Randy Moss	2018	WR	2007–2010
24	Darrelle Revis	2023	CB	2014
55	Junior Seau	2015	LB	2006–2009
93	**Richard Seymour**	2022	DE	2001–2008
56	**Andre Tippett**	2008	LB	1982–1993
4	**Adam Vinatieri**	2026	K	1996–2005
Coaches and Contributors
Name		Inducted	Position(s)	Tenure
Bill Parcells		2013	Head coach	1993–1996

==== Gallery ====
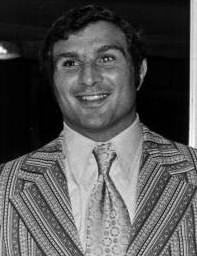
Linebacker Nick Buoniconti (1962–1968)

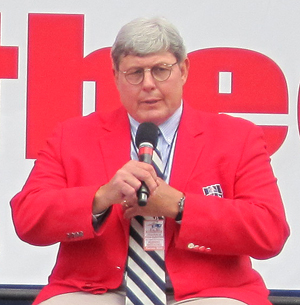
Guard John Hannah (1973–1985)

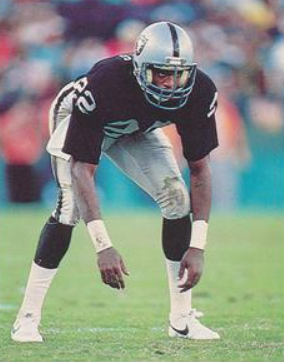
Cornerback Mike Haynes (1976–1982)

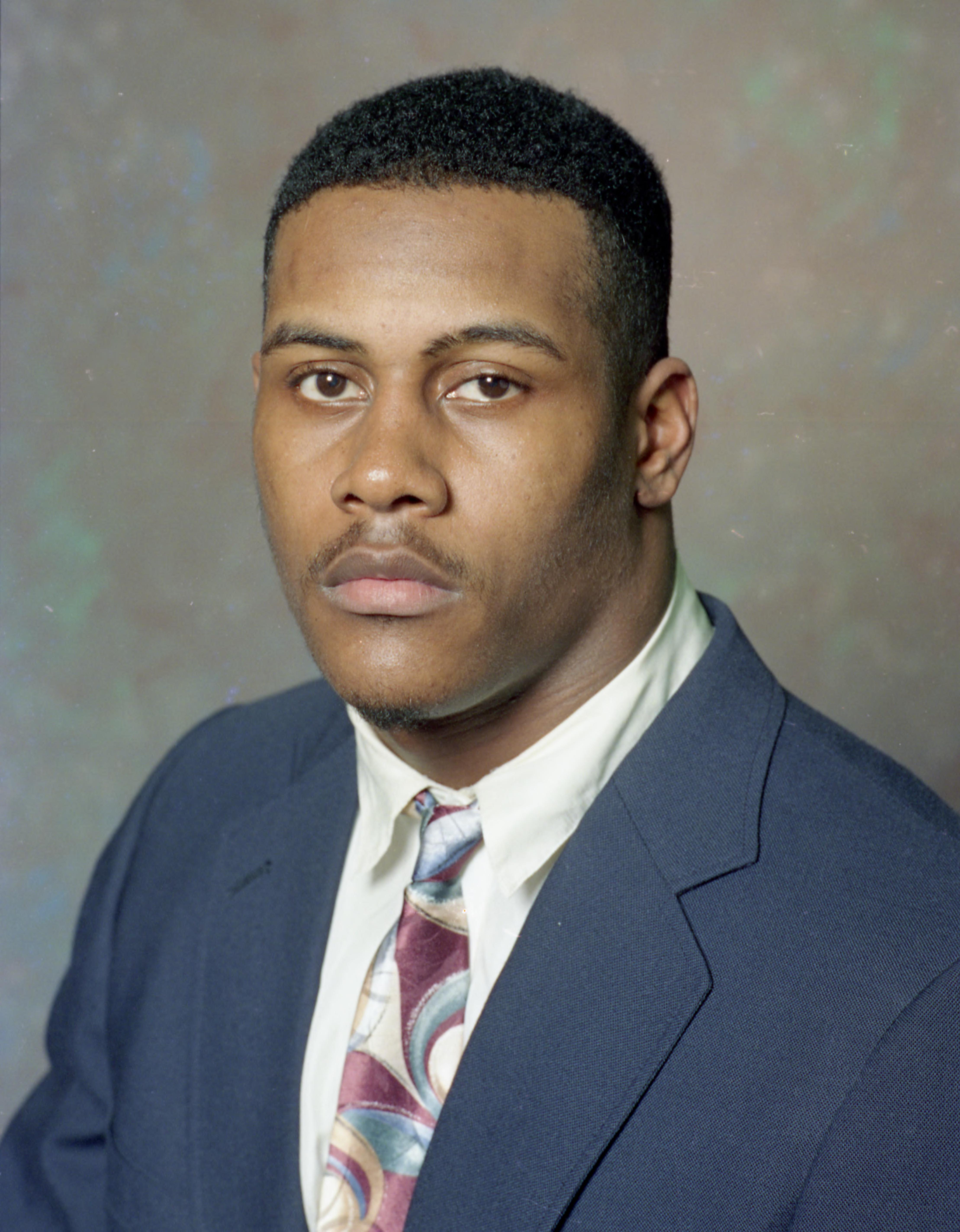
Cornerback Ty Law (1995–2004)

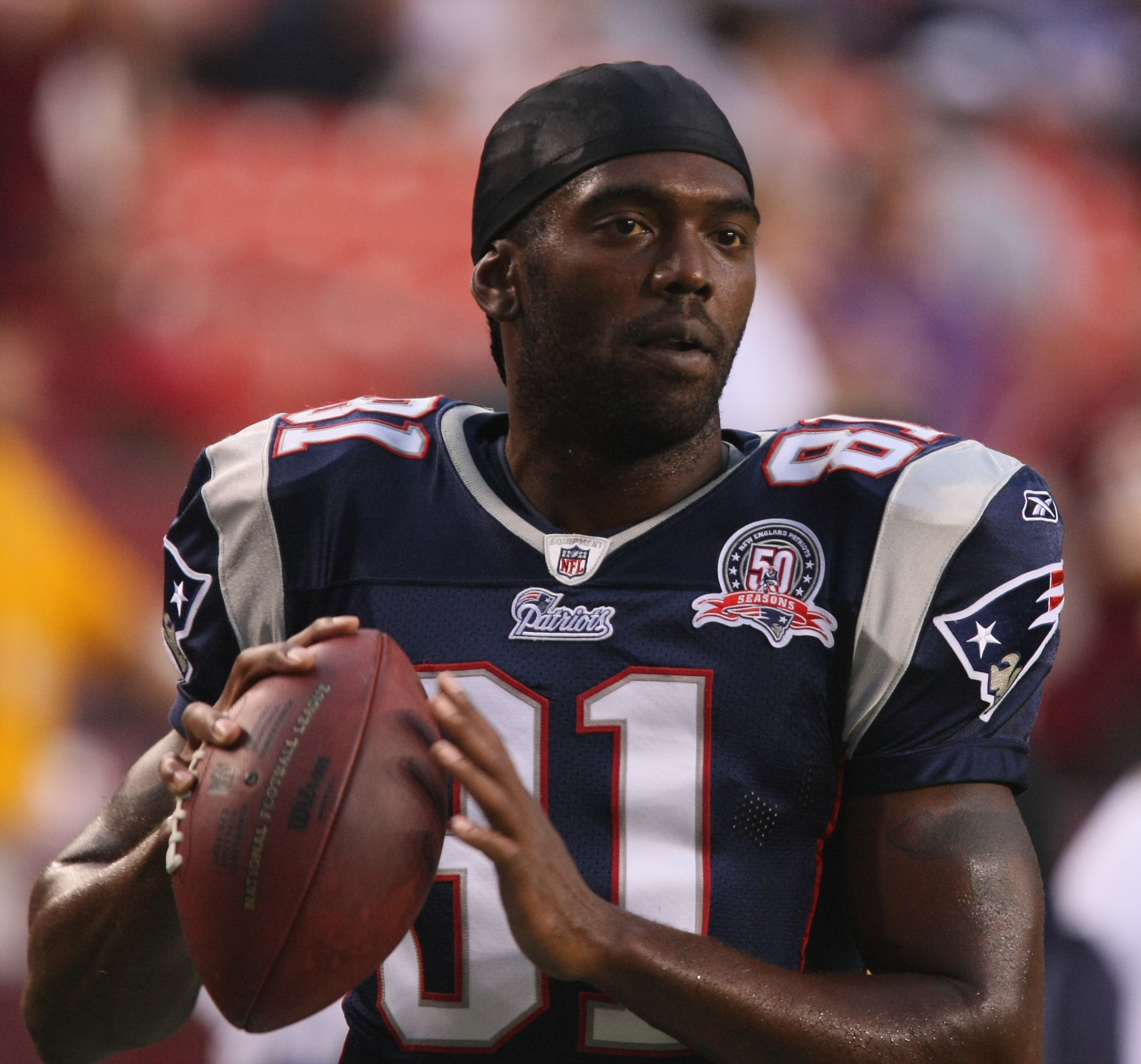
Wide receiver Randy Moss (2007–2010)

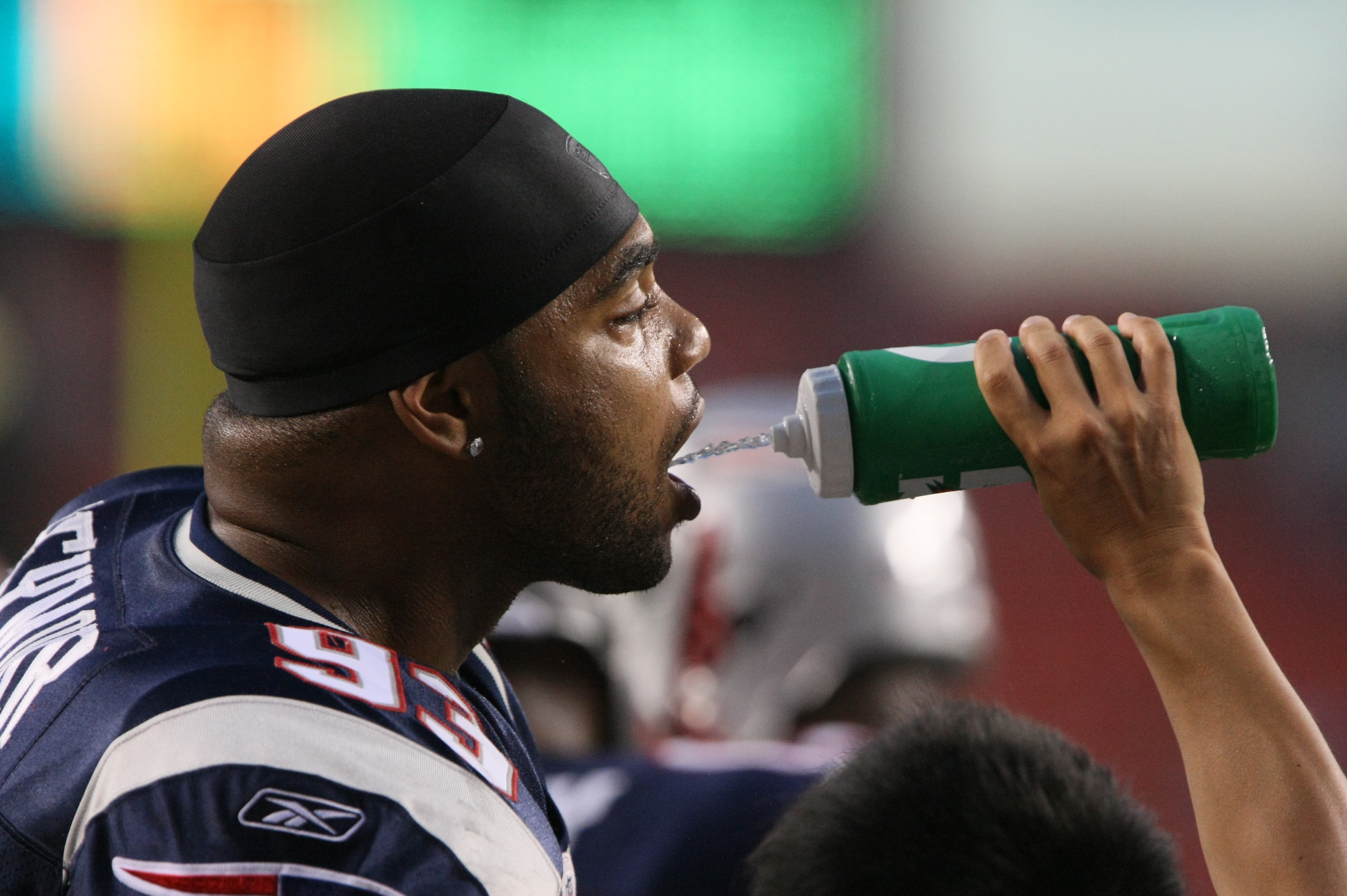
Defensive end Richard Seymour (2001–2008)

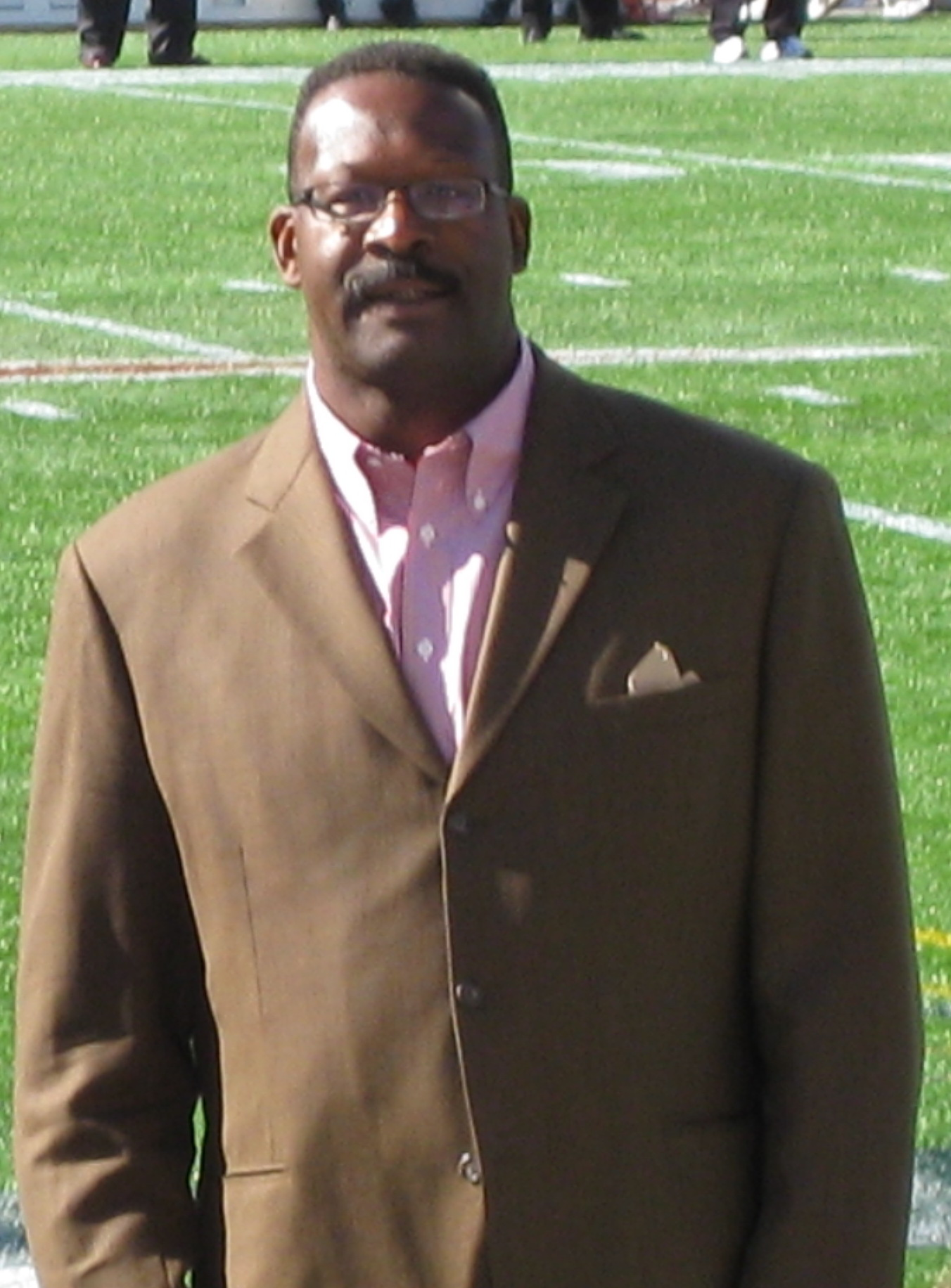
Linebacker Andre Tippett (1982–1993)

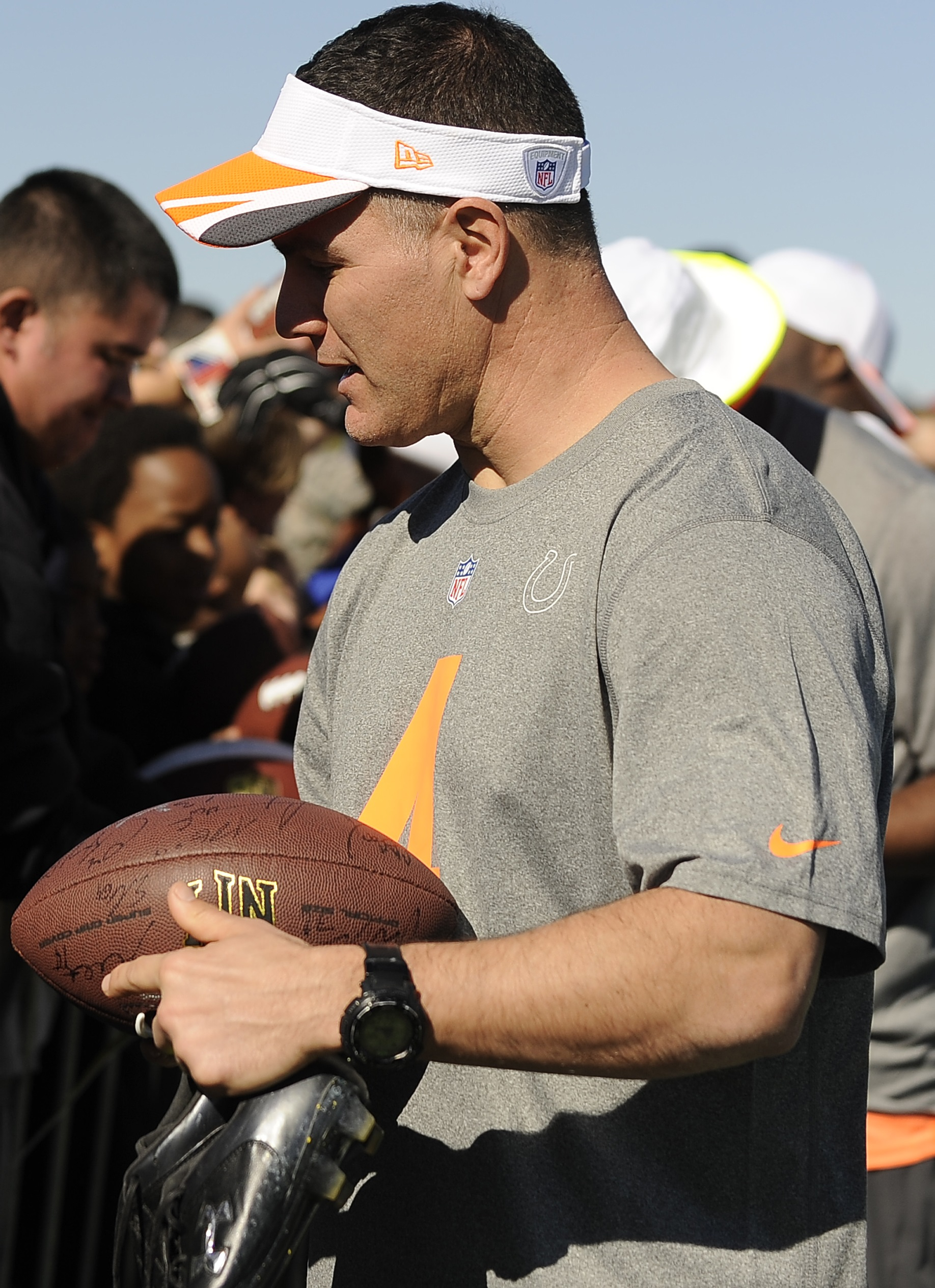
Kicker Adam Vinatieri (1996–2005)

=== Retired numbers ===
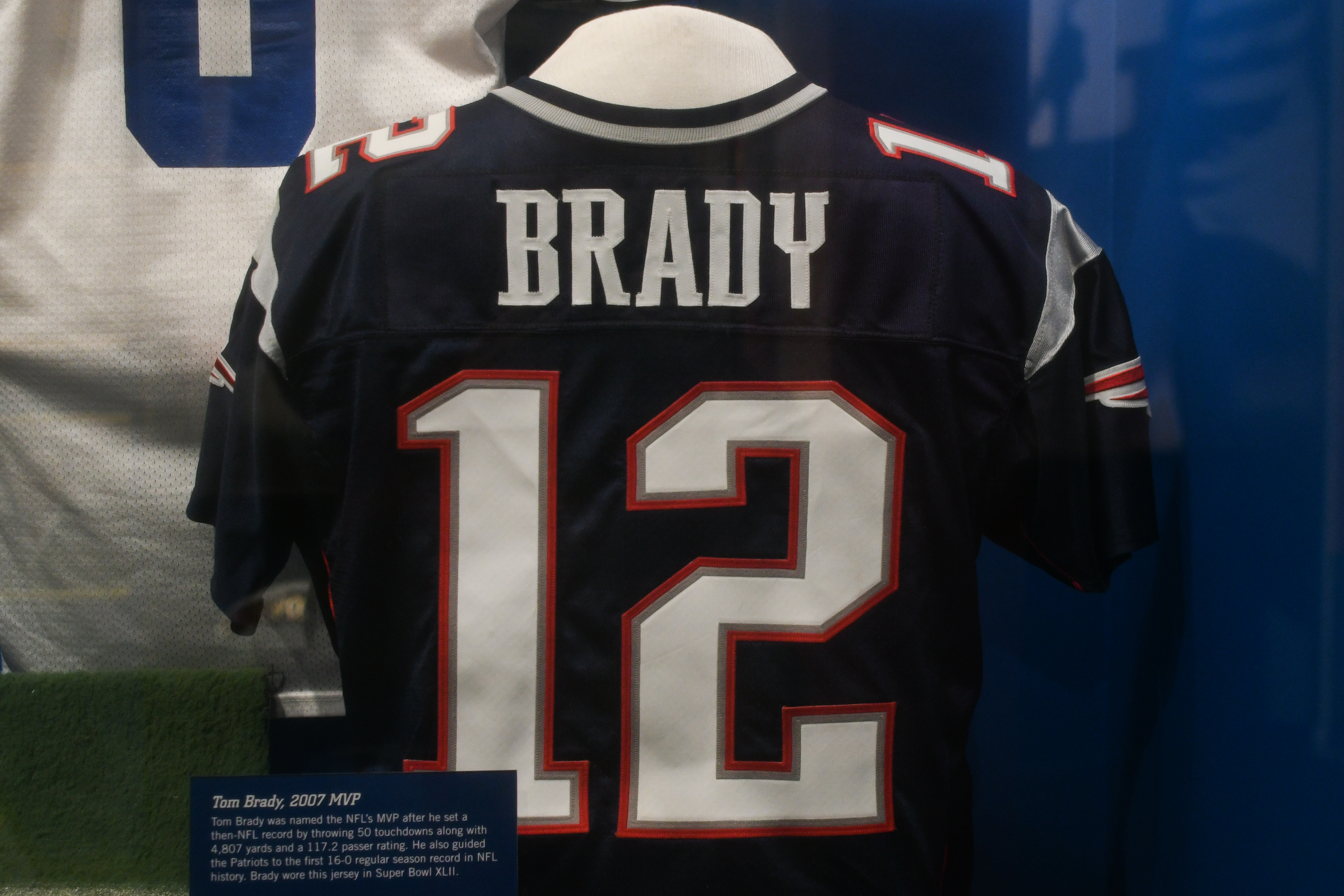
Tom Brady's #12 jersey displayed at the Pro Football Hall of Fame

Elected to the Pro Football Hall of Fame

**New England Patriots retired numbers**
No.	Player	Position	Tenure	Retired
**12**	Tom Brady	QB	2000–2019	June 12, 2024
**20**	Gino Cappelletti	FL/K	1960–1970	1971
**40**	Mike Haynes	CB	1976–1982	1996
**57**	Steve Nelson	LB	1974–1987	July 11, 1988
**73**	John Hannah	G	1973–1985	1990
**78**	Bruce Armstrong	T	1987–2000	September 30, 2001
**79**	Jim Lee Hunt	DT	1960–1970	1971
**89**	Bob Dee	DE	1960–1967	1968

=== Patriots Hall of Fame ===
The Patriots Hall of Fame features 31 former players and four contributors as a part of the franchise's own hall of fame, founded to independently commemorate significant members of the organization within the club's history. It is referred to by the team as "the franchise's highest individual honor". It was established in 1991, with John Hannah being the inaugural member.

The physical Patriots Hall of Fame building opened in 2008 outside of the stadium at Patriot Place, presented by RTX. Featuring a vast collection of game-worn gear, game-used equipment, memorabilia, trophies, in addition to multiple exhibits using audio and video technology, it is periodically renovated and updated yearly. It is described as a "modern, interactive museum".

A committee of media and staff selected 11 players for enshrinement between 1991 and 2001, before a six-year span of no selections. In 2007, in advance of the grand opening of the physical Patriots Hall of Fame in 2008, the club introduced a new nomination committee to select three candidates, with the winner of an internet fan vote being enshrined in the hall of fame. In order to be eligible, players and head coaches must be retired for at least four years. Beginning in 2011, and meeting every four-to-five years, a senior selection committee has the option of voting a player who has been retired for at least 25 seasons into the hall of fame, alongside the traditional inductee.

Starting in 2009, long-time "contributors", which can range from roles such as assistant coaches and broadcasters, have been periodically inducted into the Patriots Hall of Fame directly by owner Robert Kraft. Former team owner and founder Billy Sullivan was posthumously inducted in March 2009, before the Patriots' 50th season, as the first contributor inducted.

Elected to the Pro Football Hall of Fame

**Patriots Hall of Fame**
**No.**	**Name**	**Position**	**Years with club**	**Inducted**
65	Houston Antwine~†	DL	1961–1971	2015
78	Bruce Armstrong	T	1987–2000	2001
11	Drew Bledsoe	QB	1993–2001	2011
12	Tom Brady	QB	2000–2019	2024 (Note: Despite not technically being eligible until 2027 under the current rules, the traditional four-year waiting process was waived exclusively for Brady, directly by owner Robert Kraft, in addition to being inducted without the conventional ballot.)
80	Troy Brown	WR; KR/PR Coach	1993–2007; 2020–2024	2012
54	Tedy Bruschi	LB	1996–2008	2013
85	Nick Buoniconti	LB	1962–1968	1992
20	Gino Cappelletti	FL/K; Broadcaster	1960–1970; 1972–1978, 1988–2012	1992
26	Raymond Clayborn	CB	1977–1989	2017
87	Ben Coates	TE	1991–1999	2008
39	Sam Cunningham	RB	1973–1982	2010
89	Bob Dee†	DL	1960–1967	1993
11	Julian Edelman	WR	2009–2020	2025
33	Kevin Faulk	RB	1999–2011	2016
70	Leon Gray~†	T	1973–1978	2019
14	Steve Grogan	QB	1975–1990	1995
87	Rob Gronkowski	TE	2010–2018	2026
73	John Hannah	G	1973–1985	1991
37	Rodney Harrison	S	2003–2008	2019
40	Mike Haynes	CB	1976–1982	1994
79	Jim Lee Hunt†	DT	1960–1971	1993
24	Ty Law	CB	1995–2004	2014
72	Matt Light	T	2001–2011	2018
55	Willie McGinest	LB/DE	1994–2005	2015
86	Stanley Morgan	WR	1977–1989	2007
56	Jon Morris~	C	1964–1974	2011
35	Jim Nance†	FB	1965–1971	2009
57	Steve Nelson	LB	1974–1987	1993
15	Vito "Babe" Parilli	QB	1961–1967	1993
—	Bill Parcells*	Linebackers Coach; Head Coach	1980; 1993–1996	2025
—	Gil Santos*	Broadcaster	1972–1979; 1991–2012	2013
—	Dante Scarnecchia*	Assistant Coach	1982–1988; 1991–2013; 2016–2019	2023
93	Richard Seymour	DL	2001–2008	2020 (Note: Seymour was voted into the Patriots Hall of Fame in 2020, however due to the COVID-19 pandemic his induction did not take place until 2021.)
—	Tracy Sormanti*†	Cheerleading Director	1983–2020	2021 (Note: Sormanti, inducted as a contributor, was the only member of the class of 2021 due to the COVID-19 pandemic, as the ballot for the traditional inductee was cancelled for that year.)
—	Billy Sullivan*†	Founder/Owner	1960–1988	2009
56	Andre Tippett	LB; Executive Director of Community Affairs	1982–1993; 2007–present	1999
50	Mike Vrabel	LB; Head coach	2001–2008; 2025–present	2023
75	Vince Wilfork	DL	2004–2014	2022

Notes:

- ^{*} = Inducted as a contributor
- ^{~} = Inducted as a senior selection
- ^{†} = Posthumous induction

=== NFL All-Decade and Anniversary team selections ===
Patriots were named to the AFL All-Time Team (1960–1969), as well any NFL all-decade team after the AFL–NFL merger in 1970 (and NFL 75th and 100th Anniversary All-Time Teams, selected in 1994 and 2019, respectively). Only those who spent time with New England during the respective decades are listed for all-decade team selections.

Bold indicates those elected to the Pro Football Hall of Fame.

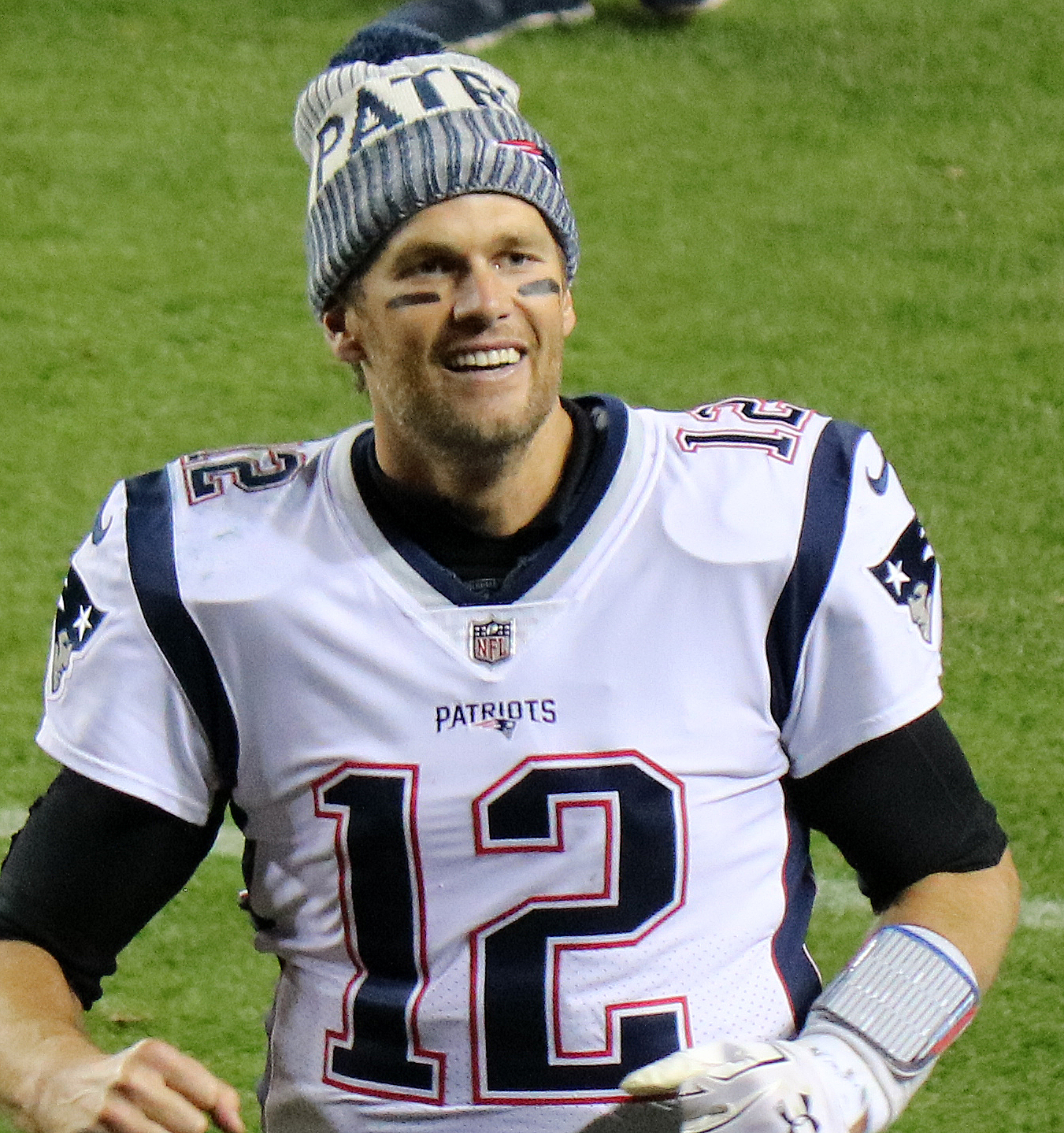
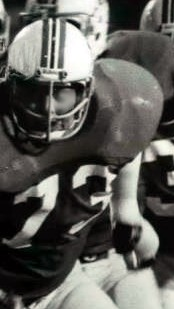
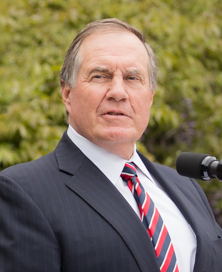
Tom Brady, John Hannah, and Bill Belichick have been named to multiple NFL all-decade teams, all entirely for their time with the Patriots. Each were also named to the honorific NFL 100th Anniversary All-Time Team. Hannah was also selected to the NFL 75th Anniversary All-Time Team.

**AFL All-Time team (1960–1969)**
No.	Name	Position	Tenure
56	Jon Morris	C	1964–1974
65	Houston Antwine	DT	1961–1971
85	**Nick Buoniconti**	MLB	1962–1968
46	Bob Scarpitto	P	1968

**NFL 1970s All-Decade Team**
No.	Name	Position	Tenure
73	**John Hannah**	G	1973–1985

**NFL 1980s All-Decade Team**
No.	Name	Position	Tenure
73	**John Hannah**	G	1973–1985
56	**Andre Tippett**	LB	1982–1993
40	**Mike Haynes**	CB	1976–1982

**NFL 75th Anniversary All-Time Team**
No.	Name	Position	Tenure
73	**John Hannah**	G	1973–1985
40	**Mike Haynes**	CB	1976–1982

**NFL 1990s All-Decade Team**
No.	Name	Position	Tenure
87	Ben Coates	TE	1991–1999
—	**Bill Parcells**	Coach	1993–1996

**NFL 2000s All-Decade Team**
No.	Name	Position	Tenure
12	Tom Brady	QB	2000–2019
81	**Randy Moss**	WR	2007–2010
93	**Richard Seymour**	DE	2001–2008
24	**Ty Law**	CB	1995–2004
4	**Adam Vinatieri**	K	1996–2005
—	Bill Belichick	Coach	2000–2023

**NFL 100th Anniversary All-Time Team**
No.	Name	Position	Tenure
12	Tom Brady	QB	2000–2019
81	**Randy Moss**	WR	2007–2010
87	Rob Gronkowski	TE	2010–2018
73	**John Hannah**	G	1973–1985
55	**Junior Seau** (Note: Seau was also a member of the NFL 1990s All-Decade Team for his time outside of New England.)	LB	2006–2009
40	**Mike Haynes**	CB	1976–1982
4	**Adam Vinatieri**	K	1996–2005
—	Bill Belichick	Coach	2000–2023

**NFL 2010s All-Decade Team**
No.	Name	Position	Tenure
12	Tom Brady	QB	2000–2019
17	Antonio Brown	WR	2019
87	Rob Gronkowski	TE	2010–2018
70	Logan Mankins	G	2005–2013
95	Chandler Jones	LB (Note: As a part of the NFL 2010s All-Decade Team, Jones was listed as a linebacker (LB) due to his time with the Arizona Cardinals, in New England however he was specifically listed as a defensive end (DE).)	2012–2015
24	**Darrelle Revis**	CB	2014
3	Stephen Gostkowski	K	2006–2019
84	Cordarrelle Patterson	KR	2018
—	Bill Belichick	Coach	2000–2023

=== Pro Bowl selections ===
Two Patriots have been named Pro Bowl MVP: Vito "Babe" Parilli in 1966 (AFL) and Ty Law, 1998's co-MVP.

Three Patriots coaches have participated in the Pro Bowl as conference coaches: Mike Holovak in 1963 and 1966 (AFL), Chuck Fairbanks in 1978, and Bill Belichick in 2006 and 2010.

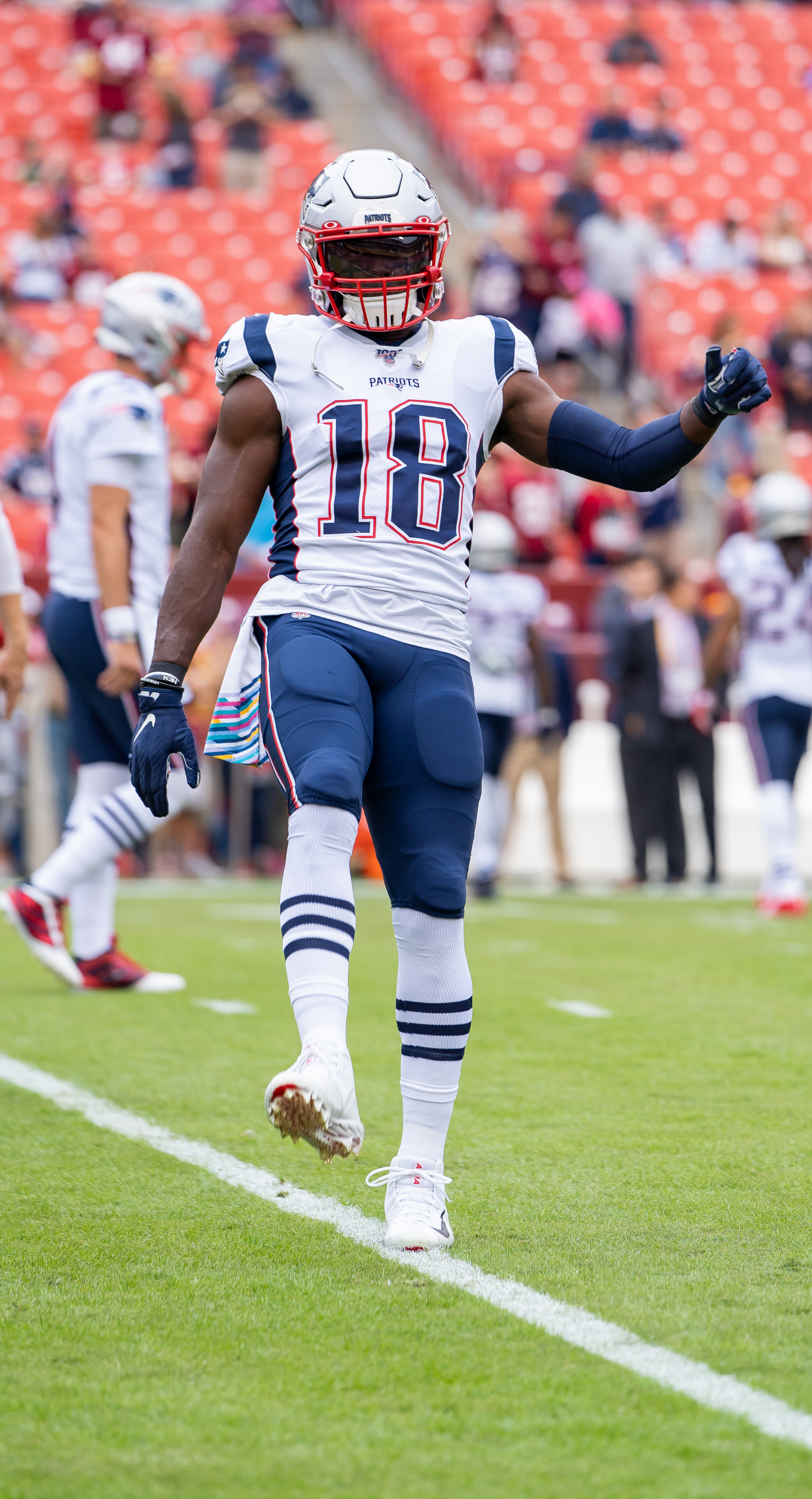
Special teams gunner Matthew Slater holds the most Pro Bowl selections among special teams player in NFL history: 10.

Patriots players named to the Pro Bowl (or the AFL All-Star game before 1970):

- **QB** Tom Brady (14), Drew Bledsoe, Vito "Babe" Parilli (3) (AFL), Drake Maye (2), Mac Jones, Mike Taliaferro
- **FB** Larry Garron (4) (AFL), Jim Nance (2) (AFL), Sam Cunningham, James Develin
- **HB** Curtis Martin (2), Tony Collins, Corey Dillon, John Stephens, Craig James, Carl Garrett (AFL)
- **LT** Bruce Armstrong (6), Matt Light, Brian Holloway (3), Leon Gray (2), Don Oakes (AFL)
- **LG** John Hannah (9), Logan Mankins (6), Charley Long (2) (AFL), Charley Leo (AFL)
- **C** Jon Morris (7) (AFL), Damien Woody, Dan Koppen
- **RG** Billy Neighbors (AFL), Len St. Jean (AFL), Brian Waters
- **RT** Tom Neville (AFL), Dick Klein (AFL)
- **TE** Rob Gronkowski, Ben Coates (5), Russ Francis (3), Marv Cook (2)
- **WR** Wes Welker, Gino Cappelletti (5) (AFL), Stanley Morgan (4), Randy Moss, Troy Brown, Terry Glenn, Irving Fryar, Ron Sellers (AFL), Jim Colclough (AFL)
- **DE** Richard Seymour (5), Bob Dee (4) (AFL), Larry Eisenhauer (4) (AFL), Julius Adams, Andre Carter, Chandler Jones
- **DT** Houston Antwine (6) (AFL), Vince Wilfork (5), Jim Lee Hunt (4) (AFL)
- **LB** Andre Tippett, Nick Buoniconti (5) (AFL), Tom Addison (4) (AFL), Steve Nelson (3), Johnny Rembert, Willie McGinest, Jerod Mayo, Dont'a Hightower, Matthew Judon (2), Chris Slade, Tedy Bruschi, Mike Vrabel, Jamie Collins
- **CB** Mike Haynes (6), Ty Law (4), Stephon Gilmore (3), Dick Felt (AFL), Chuck Shonta (AFL), Leroy Mitchell (AFL), Asante Samuel, Devin McCourty, Aqib Talib, Darrelle Revis, Malcolm Butler, J. C. Jackson, Christian Gonzalez
- **SS** Lawyer Milloy (4), Fred Bruney (2) (AFL), Ron Hall (AFL),
- **FS** Brandon Meriweather (2), Don Webb (AFL), Fred Marion, Devin McCourty
- **PK** Stephen Gostkowski (4), Adam Vinatieri (2), John Smith, Tony Franklin
- **P** Rich Camarillo, Jake Bailey
- **ST** Matthew Slater (10), Raymond Clayborn (3), Larry Izzo (2), Mosi Tatupu, Dave Meggett, Brenden Schooler

=== First-team All-Pro selections ===
These Patriots have been named AP first-team All-Pro (or All-AFL before 1970):

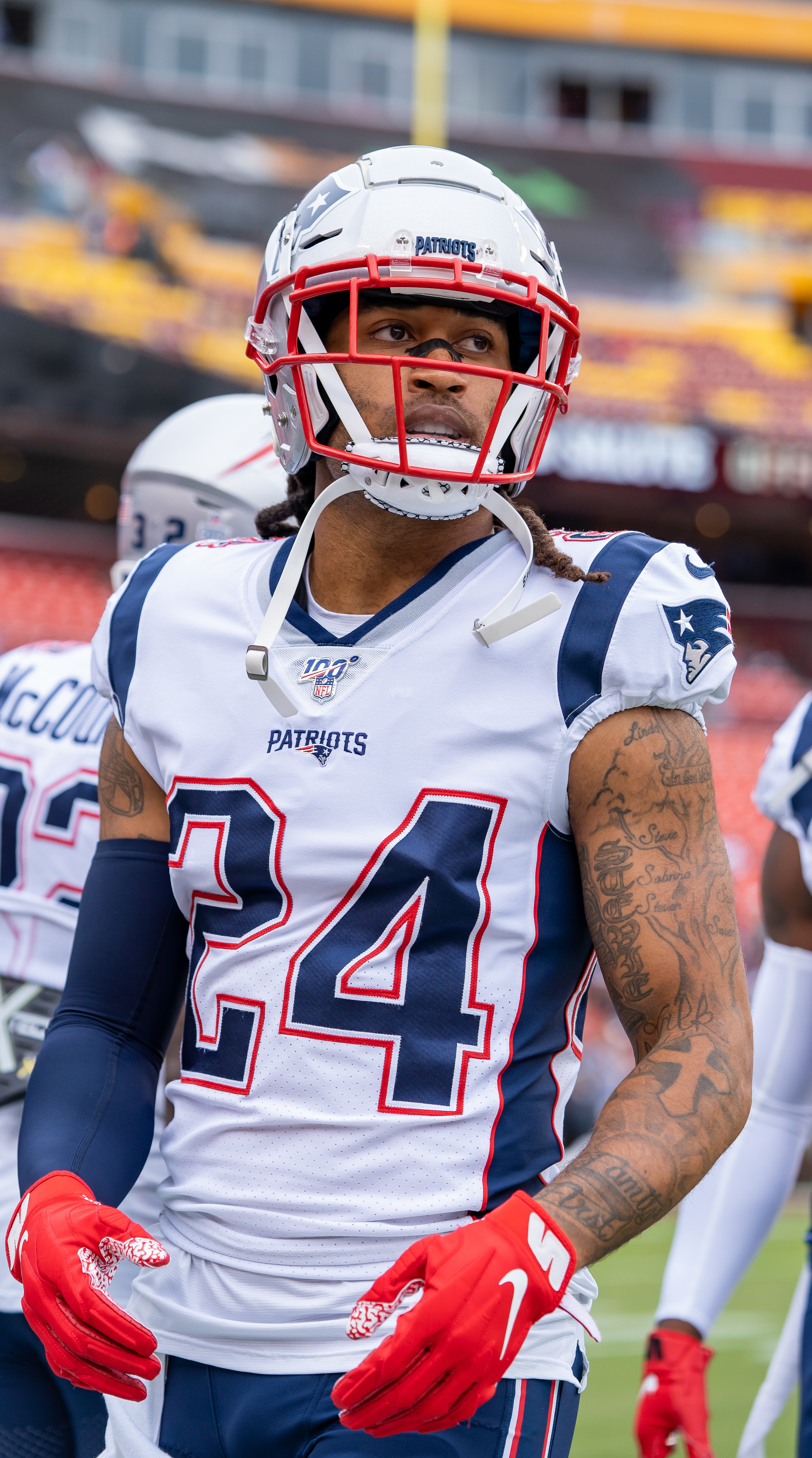
CB Stephon Gilmore, a two-time First-team All-Pro and the franchise's first NFL DPOY recipient in 2019.

- **QB** Tom Brady (3), Vito "Babe" Parilli (AFL)
- **FB** Jim Nance (AFL) (2)
- **LT** Leon Gray (3), Matt Light
- **LG** John Hannah (7), Logan Mankins
- **C** Jon Morris (AFL)
- **RG** Billy Neighbors (AFL)
- **TE** Rob Gronkowski (4), Ben Coates (2), Marv Cook, Jim Whalen (AFL)
- **WR** Wes Welker (2), Randy Moss
- **DE** Richard Seymour, Larry Eisenhauer (AFL) (3)
- **DT** Houston Antwine (AFL), Vince Wilfork
- **LB** Nick Buoniconti (4) (AFL), Andre Tippett (2), Tom Addison (AFL), Mike Vrabel, Jerod Mayo
- **CB** Ty Law, Stephon Gilmore (2), Asante Samuel, Darrelle Revis
- **SS** Ron Hall (AFL), Lawyer Milloy, Rodney Harrison
- **PK** Adam Vinatieri, Stephen Gostkowski (2)
- **P** Jake Bailey
- **ST** Matthew Slater (2), Gunner Olszewski, Marcus Jones, Brenden Schooler

== Administration and personnel ==
=== Ownership ===
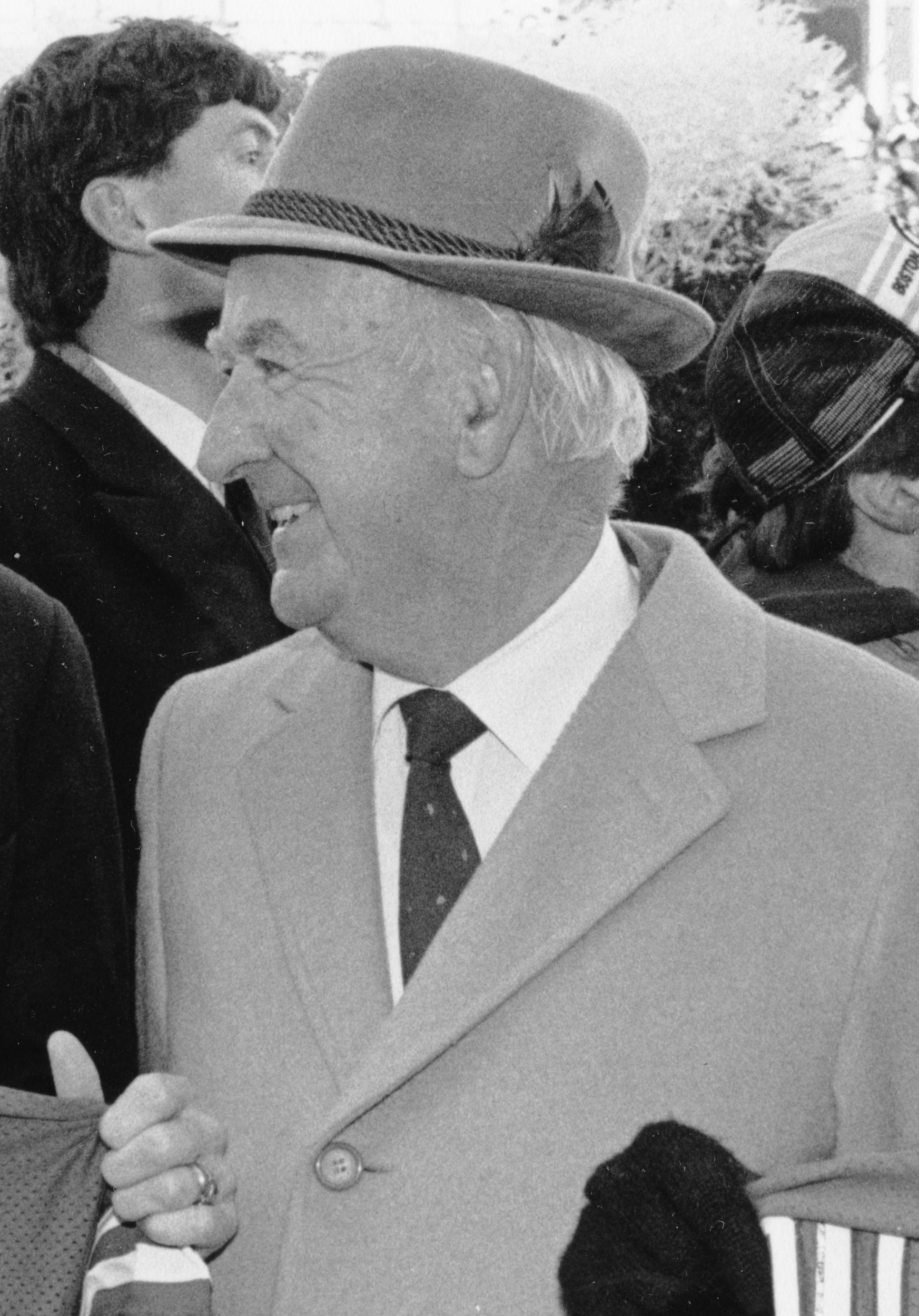
Billy Sullivan, a Massachusetts native, brought professional football back to the state after nearly 11 years by founding the Patriots in 1959. His 27-year ownership was controversial.

The Patriots have had four owners since becoming a franchise, the first being Massachusetts native Billy Sullivan from 1959 to 1988. During Sullivan's 28 seasons of owning the club, the Patriots tallied 14 winning records, made six playoff appearances, played in the 1963 AFL Championship Game and represented the AFC in Super Bowl XX. However, he was also notoriously cheap, and would cause friction with some his high-profile players who were seeking to be respected and paid more, causing someone such as future Pro Football Hall of Famer Mike Haynes to seek an owner who was team first.

After his bankruptcy, Sullivan sold the team to Remington Products owner Victor Kiam in 1988. The sale did not include Foxboro Stadium, which Sullivan lost in a bankruptcy sale to paper magnate Robert Kraft, and Kiam lost money on the deal. In 1990, Lisa Olson, a Boston Herald reporter, sued Kiam and the Patriots when Zeke Mowatt allegedly exposed himself and made lewd comments to her in the team change room. The incident stirred debate over female reporters in the locker room. Kiam became the center of the controversy when he came to the defense of the players' actions.

In his later career, Kiam's business interests moved on from the Patriots, so he sold them in 1992 to St. Louis businessman James Orthwein. During his ownership, Orthwein hired Bill Parcells as head coach and oversaw the drafting of first-overall draft pick quarterback Drew Bledsoe, who helped to return the moribund franchise to respectability. He planned to relocate the Patriots franchise to St. Louis, renaming the team the St. Louis Stallions. However, those plans were derailed when Boston paper magnate Robert Kraft, owner of Foxboro Stadium, refused to accept a buyout of the lease. Kraft used his ownership of the stadium to stage a hostile takeover, offering to pay $175 million for the Patriots franchise knowing that Orthwein no longer wanted the team if he could not move it to St. Louis. Although future St. Louis/Los Angeles Rams owner Stan Kroenke offered to buy the team for $200 million and move it to St. Louis, Orthwein would have been saddled with all moving expenses. He also would have been responsible for any legal expenses as well, and Kraft had already made it clear that he would go to court to enforce the lease. With no other choice, Orthwein accepted Kraft's bid on January 21, 1994.

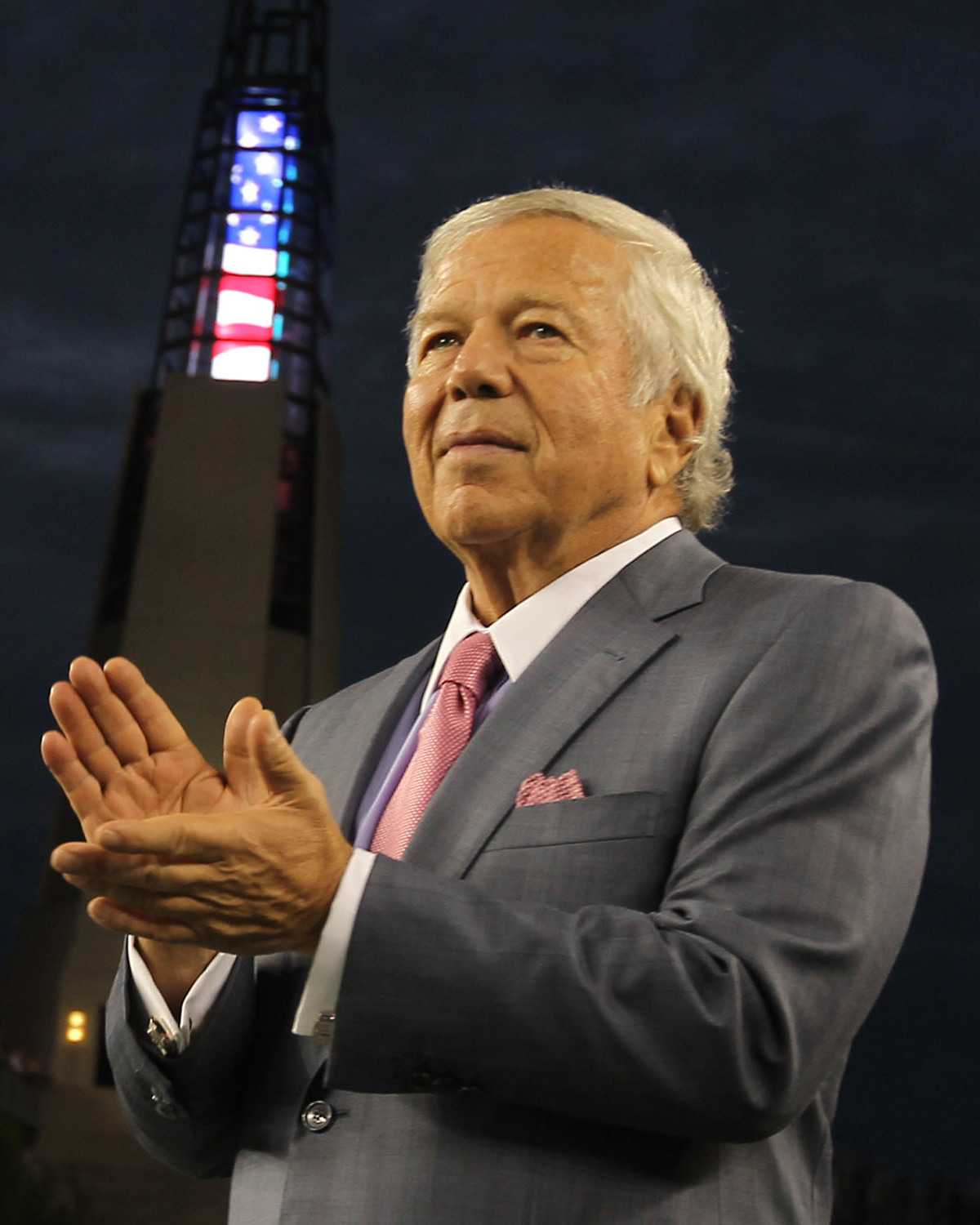
Robert Kraft, a native Bostonian and a Patriots fanatic before purchasing the team, bought the franchise in 1994.

Kraft had been a life-long fan (he was a season ticket holder since 1971) before he purchased the team and intended to support them much more than all of the previous owners did, making multiple moves that have turned New England into an admirable franchise since. The Patriots under Kraft have been the NFL's most successful franchise since 1994. Since then, the Patriots have appeared in ten Super Bowls, have won six, and had numerous league records established by the franchise.

In September 2025, Robert Kraft agreed to sell minority stakes in the franchise: 5 percent to billionaire investor Dean Metropoulos and 3 percent to private equity firm Sixth Street. The deal, which still requires approval by NFL owners, values the team at around $9 billion. The Kraft family will retain more than 90 percent ownership.

Name	Tenure	Record			Titles
Name	Tenure	W	L	T	Titles
Billy Sullivan	1960–1987	193	202	9	
Victor Kiam	1988–1991	21	43	0	
James Orthwein	1992–1993	7	25	0	
Robert Kraft	1994–present	324	176	0	6

=== Head coaches ===
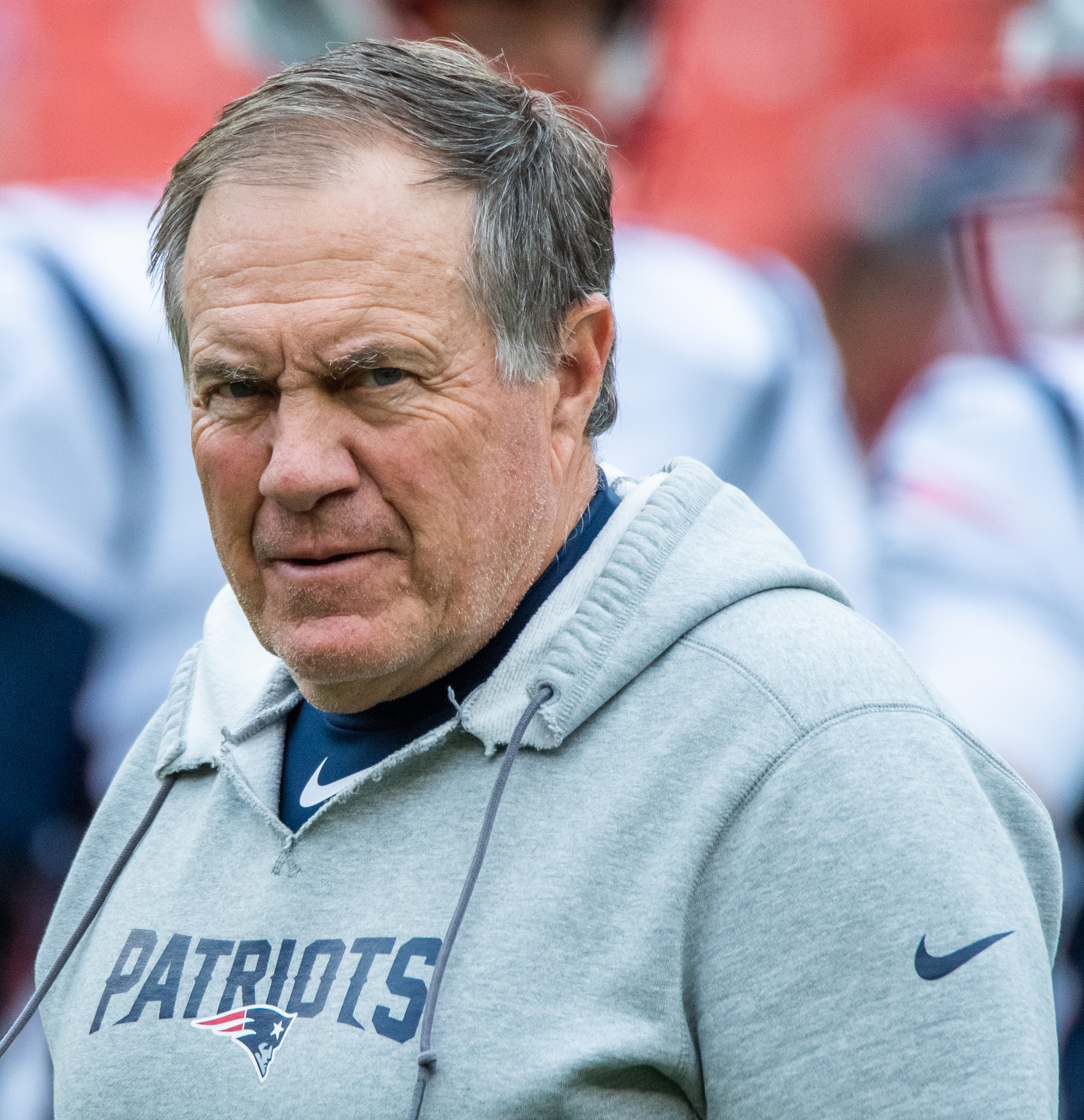
Bill Belichick, head coach from 2000 to 2023, led the Patriots to six Super Bowl titles.

The Patriots have had 16 head coaches throughout their history as a franchise. On January 12, 2025, the Patriots hired Mike Vrabel as their 16th head coach in franchise history, he is the second coach in the club's history to have played for the team (2001–2008).

Bill Belichick had the longest tenure as head coach (23 seasons) with the Patriots, and coached the team from 2000 to 2023. He has been widely considered one of the greatest coaches of all time, and was named a member of the NFL 100th All-Time Anniversary Team, due to his numerous accomplishments with the Patriots. He specifically led the Patriots to 17 AFC East division titles, 13 appearances in the AFC Championship Game, and nine Super Bowl appearances, with a record six wins.

Belichick was the NFL's longest-tenured head coach at the time of his departure, as well as the first all-time in playoff coaching wins with 31 and third in regular season coaching wins in the NFL with 297. He is one of only three head coaches who have won six NFL titles. He was named the NFL Coach of the Year for the 2003, 2007, and 2010 seasons.

Belichick was acquired in a "trade" with the rival New York Jets. Belichick did not want to be under Bill Parcells' authority there in 2000, with uncertainty of his role once their owner, Leon Hess, died. The initial promise was that Belichick would have been granted extreme authority over all of the Jets' executive decisions, but when Hess died Parcells overruled the stipulation with loopholes, so he would remain in control as general manager, leading to Belichick's infamous resignation in 2000. Parcells, a two-time Super Bowl champion coach with the New York Giants (also an assistant with the Patriots in the early 1980s), had joined New England's staff for the 1993 season to help resurrect the franchise from its dark early 1990s days but had conflicted interests with owner Robert Kraft. In his last year with the Patriots in 1996, Parcells brought in his assistant head coach from his Giants days, Belichick, after being dismissed from coaching five seasons with the Cleveland Browns. Here, Kraft would plant the seeds of a bond between him and Belichick, as Belichick would often mediate issues between Kraft and Parcells. Although Belichick left in 1997 to once again be Parcells assistant in their Jets regime, cold feet about his long-term role there brought him back after negotiating with Kraft, even though he was still under contract with the Jets. The Patriots had technically "tampered" in communicating with Belichick. For compensation, the Patriots gave the Jets their first-round pick in the 2000 NFL draft, where even without their first-round pick, the Patriots would coincidentally draft Tom Brady in the sixth round, widely regarded as the greatest quarterback of all time and the NFL's greatest draft steal.

While Belichick led the team to nine of their eleven Super Bowl appearances, winning six of them, before him the Patriots saw some championship game appearances. Holovak, Raymond Berry and Parcells all led the Patriots to league championship games, with only one coach failing to reach the Super Bowl. Five Patriots head coaches, Holovak, Chuck Fairbanks, Berry, Parcells, and Belichick, have been named Coach of the Year by at least one major news organization. The first head coach in franchise history was Lou Saban, who coached them to a 7–12–0 record in the 1960 season.

Name	Tenure	Record			Titles
Name	Tenure	W	L	T	Titles
Lou Saban	1960–1961	7	12	0	
Mike Holovak	1961–1968	52	49	9	
Clive Rush	1969–1970	5	16	0	
John Mazur	1971–1972	9	21	0	
Phil Bengtson*	1972	1	4	0	
Chuck Fairbanks	1973–1978	46	39	0	
Ron Erhardt	1979–1981	21	28	0	
Ron Meyer	1982–1984	18	15	0	
Raymond Berry	1984–1989	48	39	0	
Rod Rust	1990	1	15	0	
Dick MacPherson	1991–1992	8	24	0	
Bill Parcells	1993–1996	32	32	0	
Pete Carroll	1997–1999	27	21	0	
Bill Belichick	2000–2023	266	121	0	6
Jerod Mayo	2024	4	13	0	
Mike Vrabel	2025–present	14	3	0	

Note:

- ^{*} = Interim coach

== Current staff ==
New England Patriots staff
Front office: Chairman/CEO – Robert Kraft; President – Jonathan Kraft; Executive vice president of player personnel – Eliot Wolf; Vice president of player personnel – Ryan Cowden; Vice president of football administration – Matt Groh; Senior personnel executive – Alonzo Highsmith; Director of pro personnel – AJ Highsmith; Assistant director of pro personnel – Sam Fioroni; Director of college scouting – Tony Kinkela; Assistant director of college scouting – Matt Evans; Director of player development – James Mitchell; Director of research – Richard Miller; Director of football operations – Bobby Brown; Scouting administration coordinator – Courtney Weiner; Personnel coordinator – Brian Smith; Football operations and strategy: Vice president of football operations and strategy – John Streicher; Director of coaching analytics – Ekene Olekanma; Head coaches: Head coach – Mike Vrabel; Assistant head coach – Terrell Williams; Offensive coaches: Offensive coordinator – Josh McDaniels; Quarterbacks – Ashton Grant; Running backs – Tony Dews; Wide receivers – Todd Downing; Tight ends/passing game coordinator – Thomas Brown; Offensive line – Doug Marrone; Assistant offensive line – Jason Houghtaling; Offensive line assistant – Jonathan Decoster; Offensive analyst – Charles London; Offensive assistant – Chuckie Keeton; Offensive assistant – Riley Larkin	Defensive coaches: Defensive coordinator – Zak Kuhr; Defensive line – Clinton McMillan; Outside linebackers – Mike Smith; Inside linebackers – Vinny DePalma; Cornerbacks – Justin Hamilton; Secondary – Scott Booker; Defensive analyst – Shane Bowen; Defensive assistant – B.J. Edmonds; Defensive assistant – Kevin Richardson; Special teams coaches: Special teams coordinator – Jeremy Springer; Assistant special teams – Tom Quinn; Strength and conditioning: Director of sports performance – Frank Piraino; Strength and conditioning – Brandon Martuccio; Strength and conditioning – Deron Mayo; Strength and conditioning – Brian McDonough; → Coaching staff → Front office → More NFL staffs

== Culture ==
=== Cheerleaders ===
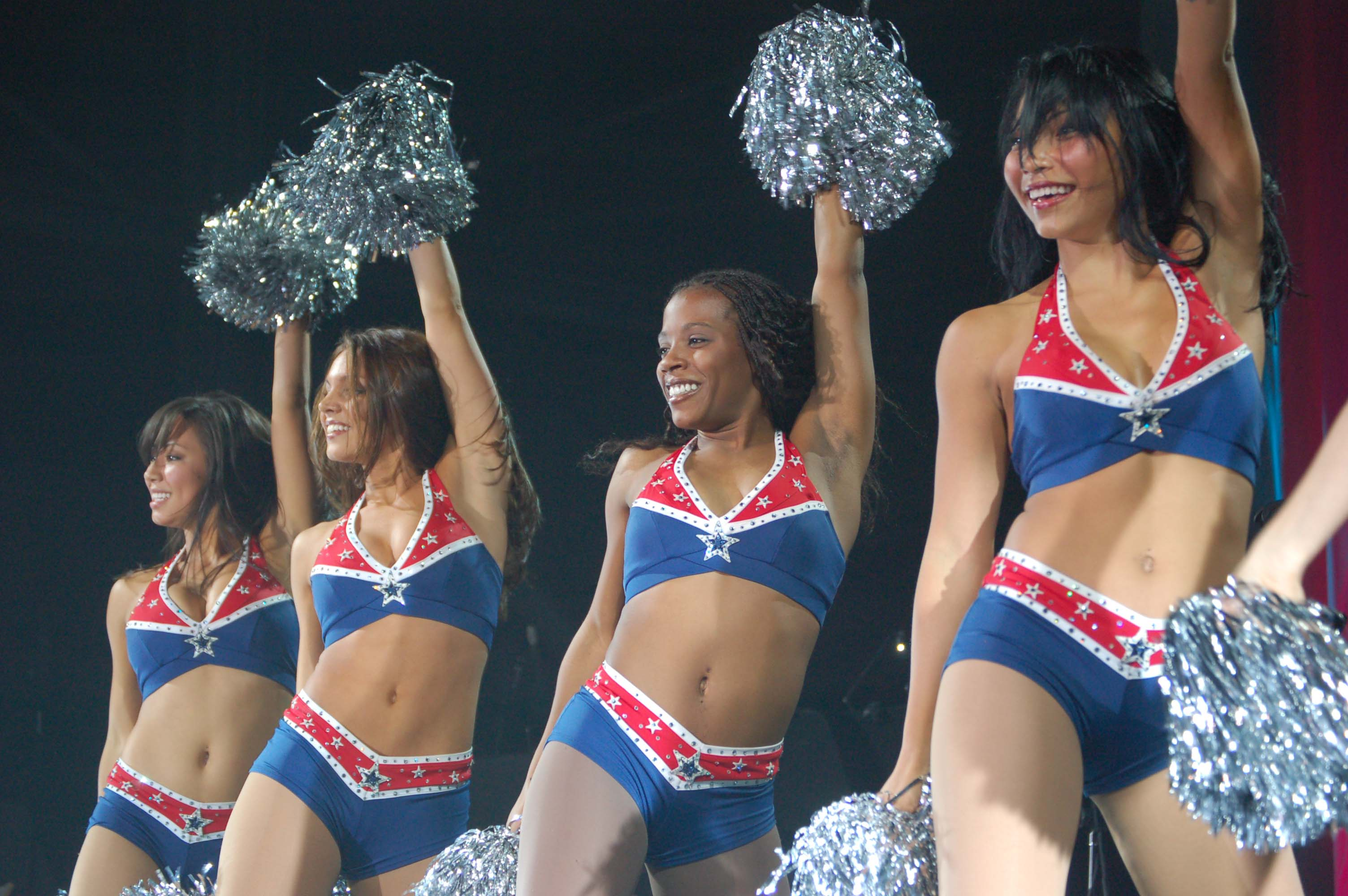
The team's cheerleading squad performing a routine in 2007

The Patriots' professional cheerleading squad is the New England Patriots Cheerleaders which represents the team in the NFL. Notable alumni of the cheerleading squad include wrestler Carmella and model Camille Kostek. Long-time cheerleading director Tracy Sormanti, who was the cheer director since 1994 and had been involved with the organization since 1983, died after a three-year battle with multiple myeloma in 2020. She was inducted into the Patriots Hall of Fame in 2021 as a contributor.

=== Mascots ===
The Patriots' official mascot since 1995 has been Pat Patriot, a revolutionary minuteman wearing a Patriots home jersey based on the original logo of the same name.

The Patriots also employ a corps known as the End Zone Militia, a group of American Revolutionary War reenactors founded in 1996 by Geoff Campbell, a reenactor for the 9th Massachusetts Regiment (26th Continental Regiment). Consisting of about 30 men and women, they dress 20 for each home game and split themselves into two groups of 10 lining the back of either end zone. When the Patriots score – whether it be a touchdown, field goal, point-after-touchdown or safety – the militia behind the opposite end zone fire a volley of blanks from flintlock muskets. Per an interview with the Loren & Wally Show on WROR 105.7 FM in and around the time of Super Bowl XLIX, said shots use double the load of black powder than a regular historical reenactor does, specifically 200 grains, in order to be heard throughout the stadium. ESPN writer Josh Pahigian named this one of the top ten celebrations in the league in 2007.

=== Fans ===
The team draws much of its fanbase from the New England region of the United States, as well as from the Canadian province of Quebec and much of Atlantic Canada.

== Radio and television ==
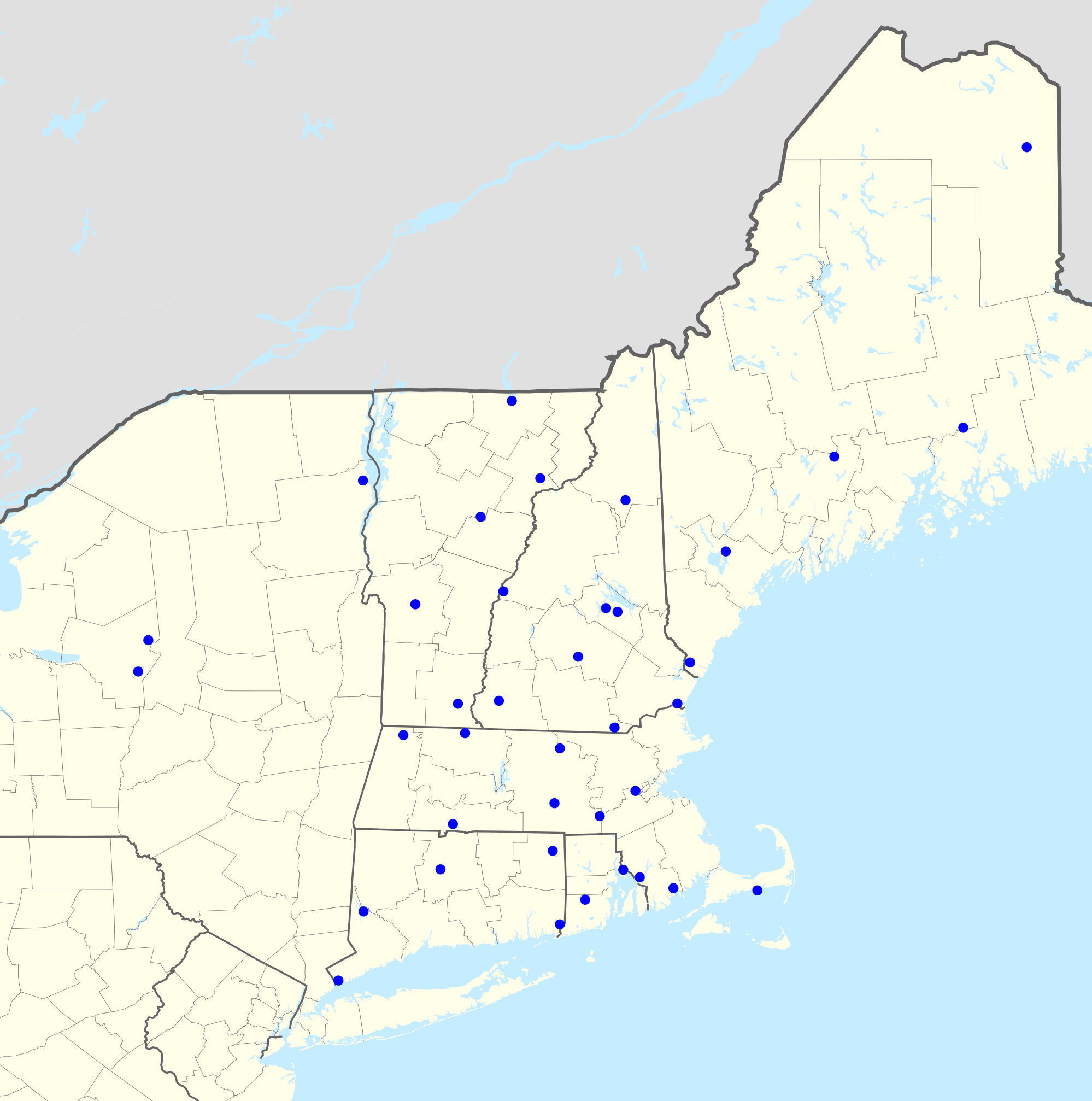
Map of New England Patriots radio affiliates

The Patriots' flagship radio station is WBZ-FM (98.5 FM, otherwise known as "The Sports Hub"), owned by Beasley Broadcast Group. The larger radio network is called the New England Patriots Radio Network, whose 37 affiliate stations span seven states. Gil Santos and Gino Cappelletti were the longtime announcing team until their retirement following the conclusion of the 2012 NFL season. Santos was replaced by Bob Socci. Former Patriots QB Scott Zolak joined the radio team in the 2011 season as a sideline analyst, and in 2013, he replaced Cappelletti as color commentator.

Any preseason games not on national television are shown on CBS's O&O WBZ-TV, who also airs the bulk of Patriots regular-season games by virtue of CBS having the rights to most AFC games; CBS also has a presence at the nearby Patriot Place with the "CBS Scene" bar and restaurant. During the regular season whenever the Patriots host an NFC team, the games are aired on Fox affiliate WFXT-TV, and NBC Sunday Night Football games are carried by Boston NBC station WBTS-CD. Preseason games were broadcast on ABC affiliate WCVB-TV from 1995 until the change to WBZ in 2009 (WCVB continues to simulcast ESPN's Monday Night Football games featuring the Patriots). Don Criqui was play-by-play announcer for the 1995–2012 seasons, with Randy Cross as a color commentator and Mike Lynch as a sideline reporter. Lynch was replaced by WBZ reporter Steve Burton in 2009.

== See also ==
- Active NFL playoff appearance streaks
- Forbes list of the most valuable sports teams
- List of National Football League records (team)
- List of Super Bowl records
- Sports in Massachusetts
- Sports in Boston

== Notes and references ==
=== Citations ===
Preceded by Baltimore Ravens	Super Bowl champions 2001 (XXXVI)	Succeeded by Tampa Bay Buccaneers
Preceded by Tampa Bay Buccaneers	Super Bowl champions 2003 (XXXVIII), 2004 (XXXIX)	Succeeded by Pittsburgh Steelers
Preceded by Seattle Seahawks	Super Bowl champions 2014 (XLIX)	Succeeded by Denver Broncos
Preceded by Denver Broncos	Super Bowl champions 2016 (LI)	Succeeded by Philadelphia Eagles
Preceded by Philadelphia Eagles	Super Bowl champions 2018 (LIII)	Succeeded by Kansas City Chiefs
