= 1967 Boston Patriots season =

Season of American Football League team the Boston Patriots

- Owner: Billy Sullivan
- Head coach: Mike Holovak
- Home stadium: Fenway Park

Results
- Record: 3–10–1
- Division place: 5th AFL Eastern
- Playoffs: Did not qualify
- AFL All-Stars: DT Houston Antwine; LB Nick Buoniconti; RB Larry Garron; DT Jim Lee Hunt; C Jon Morris; FB Jim Nance; T Don Oakes

Uniform

The 1967 Boston Patriots season was the franchise's eighth season in the American Football League. The Patriots recorded three wins, ten losses, and one tie, and finished last in the AFL's Eastern Division.

Notably, the Patriots would not record another tie prior to the introduction of overtime in professional football in 1974, and have not yet recorded a tie (as of 2026) in the overtime era, which is currently the longest such span among current National Football League teams.

== Staff ==
1967 Boston Patriots staff
Front office: President – Billy Sullivan; Head coaches: Head Coach – Mike Holovak; Offensive coaches: Offensive Line – Art Spinney	Defensive coaches: Defensive Line – Jesse Richardson; Linebackers – Rommie Loudd; Defensive Backfield/Defensive Line – Chuck Weber

== Roster ==
1967 Boston Patriots roster
Quarterbacks (QB): 15 Babe Parilli; 10 Don Trull; Running backs (RB): 27 Joe Bellino; 33 Bob Cappadona; 32 J.D. Garrett; 40 Larry Garron; 35 Jim Nance; Wide receivers (WR): 20 Gino Cappelletti K; 81 Jim Colclough; 84 Art Graham; 24 Bobby Leo; Tight ends (TE): 87 Bobby Nichols; 82 Jim Whalen	Offensive linemen (OL): 64 Jim Boudreaux T; 63 Justin Canale G; 76 Charlie Long G; 56 Jon Morris C; 77 Tom Neville T; 71 Don Oakes T; 68 Karl Singer T; 60 Len St. Jean G; Defensive linemen (DL): 65 Houston Antwine DT; 89 Bob Dee DE; 72 Larry Eisenhauer DE; 83 Tom Fussell DE; 79 Jim Lee Hunt DT; 74 John Mangum DT; 75 Ed Toner DT/DE; 70 Mel Witt DE	Linebackers (LB): 53 Tom Addison OLB; 85 Nick Buoniconti MLB; 45 Ray Ilg MLB; 52 Ed Philpott OLB; 58 Doug Satcher OLB; Defensive backs (DB): 25 John Charles CB; 21 Jay Cunningham CB/S; 44 White Graves SS; 23 Ron Hall FS; 47 Bill Johnson CB/S; 41 Leroy Mitchell CB; 34 Chuck Shonta SS; 42 Don Webb FS; Special teams (ST): 36 Terry Swanson P	Reserve: 55 Lonnie Farmer LB (IR); Rookies in italics

== Game-by-game results ==
Week	Date	Opponent	Result	Record	Venue	Attendance	Recap
1	September 3	at Denver Broncos	**L** 21–26	0–1	Bears Stadium	35,488	Recap
2	September 9	at San Diego Chargers	**L** 14–28	0–2	San Diego Stadium	39,227	Recap
3	September 17	at Oakland Raiders	**L** 7–35	0–3	Oakland–Alameda County Coliseum	26,289	Recap
4	September 24	at **Buffalo Bills**	**W** 23–0	1–3	War Memorial Stadium	45,748	Recap
5	Bye						
6	October 8	San Diego Chargers	**T** 31–31	1–3–1	San Diego Stadium*	23,620	Recap
7	October 15	**Miami Dolphins**	**W** 41–10	2–3–1	Alumni Stadium**	23,955	Recap
8	October 22	Oakland Raiders	**L** 14–48	2–4–1	Fenway Park	25,057	Recap
9	October 29	at **New York Jets**	**L** 23–30	2–5–1	Shea Stadium	62,784	Recap
10	November 5	**Houston Oilers**	**W** 18–7	3–5–1	Fenway Park	19,422	Recap
11	November 12	Kansas City Chiefs	**L** 10–33	3–6–1	Fenway Park	23,010	Recap
12	November 19	**New York Jets**	**L** 24–29	3–7–1	Fenway Park	26,790	Recap
13	November 26	at **Houston Oilers**	**L** 6–27	3–8–1	Rice Stadium	28,044	Recap
14	Bye						
15	December 9	**Buffalo Bills**	**L** 16–44	3–9–1	Fenway Park	20,627	Recap
16	December 17	at **Miami Dolphins**	**L** 32–41	3–10–1	Miami Orange Bowl	25,969	Recap
17	Bye						
Note: Intra-division opponents are in **bold** text.

Notes:

- (*) Played at San Diego Stadium because of the World Series at Fenway Park.
- (**) Played at Alumni Stadium because of the World Series at Fenway Park.

== Game summaries ==
=== Week 4 ===
Team	1	2	3	4	Total
• Patriots	6	7	0	10	23
Bills	0	0	0	0	0

- Date: September 24
- Location: War Memorial Stadium
- Game attendance: 45,748
- Game weather: 54 °F (12 °C); wind 15 mph

Scoring summary
Q1	BOS	Cappelletti 24 yard field goal	BOS 3–0
Q1	BOS	Cappelletti 23 yard field goal	BOS 6–0
Q2	BOS	Nance 3 yard run (Cappelletti kick)	BOS 13–0
Q4	BOS	Garron 11 yard pass from Parilli (Cappelletti kick)	BOS 20–0
Q4	BOS	Cappelletti 45 yard field goal	BOS 23–0

== Standings ==
AFL Eastern Division
	W	L	T	PCT	DIV	PF	PA	STK
Houston Oilers	9	4	1	.692	5–1–1	258	199	W2
New York Jets	8	5	1	.615	5–1–1	371	329	W1
Buffalo Bills	4	10	0	.286	3–5	237	285	L1
Miami Dolphins	4	10	0	.286	2–6	219	407	L1
Boston Patriots	3	10	1	.231	3–5	280	389	L5

Note: Tie games were not officially counted in the standings in the AFL.
