= 1965 Boston Patriots season =

Season of American Football League team the Boston Patriots

- Owner: Billy Sullivan
- Head coach: Mike Holovak
- Home stadium: Fenway Park

Results
- Record: 4–8–2
- Division place: 3rd AFL Eastern
- Playoffs: Did not qualify
- AFL All-Stars: DT Houston Antwine; LB Nick Buoniconti; DE Bob Dee; C Jon Morris

Uniform

The 1965 Boston Patriots season was the franchise's sixth season in the American Football League. The Patriots ended the season with a record of four wins and eight losses and two ties, and finished third in the AFL's Eastern Division.

== Staff ==
1965 Boston Patriots staff
Front office: President – Billy Sullivan; Head coaches: Head coach – Mike Holovak; Offensive coaches: Offensive line – Art Spinney	Defensive coaches: Defensive line – Jesse Richardson; Defensive backfield/defensive line – Chuck Weber

== Game-by-game results ==
Week	Date	Opponent	Result	Record	Venue	Attendance	Recap
1	September 11	at **Buffalo Bills**	**L** 7–24	0–1	War Memorial Stadium	45,502	Recap
2	September 19	at **Houston Oilers**	**L** 10–31	0–2	Rice Stadium	32,445	Recap
3	September 24	Denver Broncos	**L** 10–27	0–3	Fenway Park	26,782	Recap
4	October 3	at Kansas City Chiefs	**L** 17–27	0–4	Municipal Stadium	26,773	Recap
5	October 8	Oakland Raiders	**L** 10–24	0–5	Fenway Park	24,824	Recap
6	October 17	San Diego Chargers	**T** 13–13	0–5–1	Fenway Park	20,924	Recap
7	October 24	at Oakland Raiders	**L** 30–21	0–6–1	Frank Youell Field	20,858	Recap
8	October 31	at San Diego Chargers	**W** 22–6	1–6–1	Balboa Stadium	33,366	Recap
9	November 7	**Buffalo Bills**	**L** 7–23	1–7–1	Fenway Park	24,415	Recap
10	November 14	**New York Jets**	**L** 20–30	1–8–1	Fenway Park	18,589	Recap
11	November 21	Kansas City Chiefs	**T** 10–10	1–8–2	Fenway Park	13,056	Recap
12	November 28	at **New York Jets**	**W** 27–23	2–8–2	Shea Stadium	59,334	Recap
13	Bye						
14	December 12	at Denver Broncos	**W** 28–20	3–8–2	Bears Stadium	27,207	Recap
15	December 18	**Houston Oilers**	**W** 42–14	4–8–2	Fenway Park	14,508	Recap
Note: Intra-division opponents are in **bold** text.

== Standings ==
AFL Eastern Division
	W	L	T	PCT	DIV	PF	PA	STK
Buffalo Bills	10	3	1	.769	4–2	313	226	L1
New York Jets	5	8	1	.385	3–3	285	303	W1
Boston Patriots	4	8	2	.333	2–4	244	302	W3
Houston Oilers	4	10	0	.286	3–3	298	429	L7

Note: Tie games were not officially counted in the standings in the AFL.

== Roster ==
1965 Boston Patriots roster
Quarterbacks (QB): 15 Babe Parilli; 12 Eddie Wilson; Running backs (RB): 22 Ron Burton; 32 J.D. Garrett; 40 Larry Garron; 38 Ellis Johnson; 35 Jim Nance; Wide receivers (WR): 20 Gino Cappelletti K; 81 Jim Colclough; 84 Art Graham; Tight ends (TE): 86 Tony Romeo; 82 Jim Whalen	Offensive linemen (OL): 63 Justin Canale G; 76 Charlie Long G; 56 Jon Morris C; 73 Billy Neighbors G; 77 Tom Neville T; 71 Don Oakes T; 70 Bob Yates T; Defensive linemen (DL): 72 Larry Eisenhauer DE; 65 Houston Antwine DT; 79 Jim Lee Hunt DT; 75 George Pyne DT; 89 Bob Dee DE; 60 Len St. Jean DE	Linebackers (LB): 53 Tom Addison OLB; 85 Nick Buoniconti MLB; 54 Mike Dukes OLB; 52 Ed Meixler MLB; 80 Jack Rudolph OLB; Defensive backs (DB): 21 Jay Cunningham CB/S; 44 White Graves FS; 27 Ron Hall FS; 30 Tom Hennessey CB; 25 Ross O'Hanley SS; 34 Chuck Shonta CB; 42 Don Webb CB; Special teams (ST): 14 Tom Yewcic P	Reserve: 27 Joe Bellino RB (IR); 55 Lonnie Farmer LB (IR); 24 Dick Felt CB (IR); 74 Bob Schmidt T (IR); Rookies in italics
