= 1962 Boston Patriots season =

Season of American Football League team the Boston Patriots

- Owner: Billy Sullivan
- Head coach: Mike Holovak
- Home stadium: Boston University Field; Harvard Stadium (Sep 16)

Results
- Record: 9–4–1
- Division place: 2nd AFL Eastern
- Playoffs: Did not qualify
- AFL All-Stars: LB Tom Addison; DB Fred Bruney; DE Larry Eisenhauer; WR Jim Colclough; DB Dick Felt; T Charlie Long

Uniform

The 1962 Boston Patriots season was the franchise's third season in the American Football League. The Patriots ended with a record of nine wins and four losses and one tie, second in the AFL's Eastern Division.

This was the Patriots' third and final season at Boston University Field, with the home opener at Harvard Stadium; they moved to Fenway Park in 1963 and played there for six seasons, through 1968.

== Staff ==
1962 Boston Patriots staff
Front office: President – Billy Sullivan; Head coaches: Head Coach – Mike Holovak; Offensive coaches: Offensive Line – Art Spinney	Defensive coaches: Defensive Line – Marion Campbell; Defensive Backfield – Fred Bruney

== Draft picks ==
Round	Player	Position	College
1	Gary Collins	End	Maryland
2	Leroy Jackson	Halfback	Western Illinois
3	Sherwyn Thorson	Guard	Iowa
6	Billy Neighbors	Tackle	Alabama
7	John Schopf	Tackle	Michigan
8	Bennie McRae	Halfback	Michigan
9	Bill Triplett	Fullback	Miami (Ohio)
10	John Knight	Halfback	Valparaiso
13	Nick Buoniconti	Guard	Notre Dame
14	Chuck Sieminski	Tackle	Penn State
15	Gerry Goerlitz	Guard	Northern Michigan
16	Ken Byers	Guard	Cincinnati
17	Scott Maentz	End	Michigan
18	Tom Chandler	Tackle	Florida A&M
19	Ron Meyers	End	Villanova
20	Tommy Neck	Halfback	LSU
21	John Traynham	Halfback	VMI
22	Bob Asack	Tackle	Columbia
23	Walt Crate	Halfback	Penn Military
24	Don Christman	Center	Richmond
25	Bob Stern	Center	Richmond
26	Jim Field	Quarterback	LSU
27	Al Gursky	Halfback	Penn State
28	Charles Dickerson	Tackle	Illinois
29	Julius Fincke	Tackle	McNeese State
30	John Finn	Tackle	Louisville
31	Mike Ingram	Guard	Ohio State
32	Charles Taylor	Halfback	Mississippi
33	Steve Jastrzembski	End	Pittsburgh
34	Ray Lardani	Tackle	Miami (Florida)

== Schedule ==
=== Preseason ===
Week	Date	Opponent	Result	Venue	Attendance
1		Oakland Raiders	**L** 20–21	Providence, Rhode Island	9,000
2		at Buffalo Bills	**W** 12–7	War Memorial Stadium	22,112
3		at Houston Oilers	**L** 10–20	New Orleans, Louisiana	31,000
4		New York Titans	**W** 17–10	Lowell, Massachusetts	11,118
5		Buffalo Bills	**L** 6–7	Harvard Stadium	8,783

=== Regular season ===
Week	Date	Opponent	Result	Record	Venue	Attendance	Game recap
1	September 8	at Dallas Texans	**L** 28–48	0–1	Cotton Bowl	32,000	Recap
2	September 16	**Houston Oilers**	**W** 32–21	1–1	Harvard Stadium	32,276	Recap
3	September 21	Denver Broncos	**W** 41–16	2–1	Boston University Field	21,038	Recap
4	Bye						
5	October 6	at **New York Titans**	**W** 43–14	3–1	Polo Grounds	14,412	Recap
6	October 12	Dallas Texans	**L** 7–27	3–2	Boston University Field	23,874	Recap
7	October 19	San Diego Chargers	**W** 24–20	4–2	Boston University Field	20,888	Recap
8	October 26	Oakland Raiders	**W** 26–16	5–2	Boston University Field	12,514	Recap
9	November 3	at **Buffalo Bills**	**T** 28–28	5–2–1	War Memorial Stadium	33,247	Recap
10	November 11	at Denver Broncos	**W** 33–29	6–2–1	Bears Stadium	28,187	Recap
11	November 18	at **Houston Oilers**	**L** 17–21	6–3–1	Jeppesen Stadium	35,250	Recap
12	November 23	**Buffalo Bills**	**W** 21–10	7–3–1	Boston University Field	20,021	Recap
13	November 30	**New York Titans**	**W** 24–17	8–3–1	Boston University Field	20,015	Recap
14	December 9	at San Diego Chargers	**W** 20–14	9–3–1	Balboa Stadium	19,887	Recap
15	December 16	at Oakland Raiders	**L** 0–20	9–4–1	Frank Youell Field	8,000	Recap
Note: Intra-division opponents are in **bold** text.

== Standings ==
AFL Eastern Division
	W	L	T	PCT	DIV	PF	PA	STK
Houston Oilers	11	3	0	.786	5–1	387	270	W7
Boston Patriots	9	4	1	.692	4–1–1	346	295	L1
Buffalo Bills	7	6	1	.538	1–4–1	309	272	W2
New York Titans	5	9	0	.357	1–5	278	423	L3

Note: Tie games were not officially counted in the standings in the AFL.

== Roster ==
Boston Patriots 1962 roster
Quarterbacks: 12 Don Allard; 14 Tom Yewcic P; Running backs: 22 Ron Burton; 30 Jim Crawford; 32 Billy Lott; 41 Claude King; Wide receivers: 20 Gino Cappelletti K; 81 Jim Colclough; Tight ends: 86 Tony Romeo; 45 Thomas Stephens	Offensive linemen: 54 Walt Cudzik C; 70 Milt Graham T; 76 Charlie Long T; 73 Billy Neighbors G; 64 Tony Sardisco G; 50 Bob Yates C/T; Defensive linemen: 65 Houston Antwine DT; 89 Bob Dee DE; 72 Larry Eisenhauer DE; 79 Jim Lee Hunt DT/DE; 62 Dick Klein DT; 61 Jess Richardson DT	Linebackers: 53 Tom Addison OLB; 85 Nick Buoniconti MLB; 46 Rommie Loudd OLB; 83 Harry Jacobs MLB; 80 Jack Rudolph OLB; Defensive backs: 33 Fred Bruney SS; 24 Dick Felt CB; 23 Ron Hall SS; 25 Ross O'Hanley FS; 34 Chuck Shonta CB; 48 Don Webb CB	Reserve list: 40 Larry Garron RB (IR); -- Ray Lardani T (IR); 63 Chuck Leo G (IR); 15 Babe Parilli QB (IR)
