= 1964 American Football League All-Star game =

American football exhibition game

1964 AFL All-Star Game
East	West
24	27
	1	2	3	4	Total
East	10	14	0	0	24
West	0	3	14	10	27
- Date: January 19, 1964
- Stadium: Jeppesen Stadium; Houston, Texas
- Co-MVPs: Keith Lincoln (San Diego Chargers), Archie Matsos (Oakland Raiders)
- Attendance: 20,016

TV in the United States
- Network: ABC
- Announcers: Curt Gowdy, Paul Christman

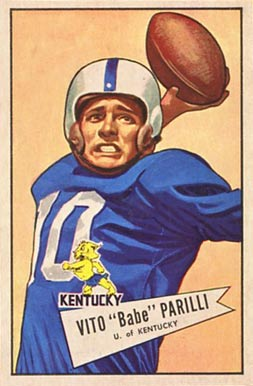
Two touchdown passes by Babe Parilli had the East ahead 24–3 at halftime.

The 1964 All-Star Game was the AFL's third annual season-ending showpiece, which featured the outstanding performers from the 1963 season. A team drawn from the Western Division defeated their Eastern counterparts by a score of 27–24, scoring 24 unanswered points after trailing 24–3 at halftime. The head coaches were Sid Gillman and Mike Holovak, who had faced each other in the AFL Championship game two weeks earlier, with Gillman's Chargers beating Holovak's Patriots 51–10. The MVP of that game, Keith Lincoln, was named offensive MVP of the All-Star game after rushing for 121 yards and a touchdown. Raiders linebacker Archie Matsos intercepted a pass and won the defensive MVP award.

== Rosters ==
The 22 offensive and defensive players for the two teams were decided by a players' vote, while head coaches Sid Gillman and Mike Holovak named the remainder of the 29-man squads, also selecting replacements for players forced to pull out.

=== Offense ===
Position:	East:	West:
Quarterback	Babe Parilli, Boston; Jack Kemp, Buffalo; George Blanda, Houston	Tobin Rote, San Diego; Cotton Davidson, Oakland
Running back	Cookie Gilchrist, Buffalo; Bill Mathis, New York; Larry Garron, Boston	Keith Lincoln, San Diego; Paul Lowe, San Diego; Clem Daniels, Oakland
Flanker	Charley Hennigan, Houston	Lance Alworth, San Diego
End	Bake Turner, New York; Gino Cappelletti, Boston; Ernie Warlick, Buffalo	Art Powell, Raiders; Dave Kocourek, San Diego; Fred Arbanas, Kansas City
Offensive tackle	Stew Barber, Buffalo; Rich Michael, Houston	Jim Tyrer, Kansas City; Ron Mix, San Diego; Ernie Wright, San Diego
Offensive guard	Bob Talamini, Houston; Billy Shaw, Buffalo; Billy Neighbors, Boston; Charley Long, Boston	Wayne Hawkins, Oakland; Ed Budde, Kansas City
Center	Bob Schmidt, Houston	Jim Otto, Oakland

=== Defense ===
Position:	East:	West:
Defensive end	Larry Eisenhauer, Boston; Bob Dee, Boston	Earl Faison, San Diego; Mel Branch, Kansas City
Defensive tackle	Tom Sestak, Buffalo; Houston Antwine, Boston; Ed Husmann, Houston	Dave Costa, Oakland; Ernie Ladd, San Diego; Bud McFadin, Denver
Linebacker	Nick Buoniconti, Boston; Larry Grantham, New York; Tom Addison, Boston; Mike Stratton, Buffalo	Chuck Allen, San Diego; Emil Karas, San Diego; Jim Fraser, Denver; Archie Matsos, Oakland; Walt Corey, Kansas City
Defensive back	Tony Banfield, Houston; Jim Norton, Houston; Fred Glick, Houston; Willie West, Buffalo; Ron Hall, Boston	Dave Grayson, Kansas City; Fred Williamson, Oakland; Goose Gonsoulin, Denver; Duane Wood, Kansas City; Johnny Robinson, Kansas City

== The game ==
1964 AFL All-Star Game: East vs. West

Quarter	1	2	3	4	Total
East	10	14	0	0	24
West	0	3	14	10	27

at Balboa Stadium in San Diego, California

- Date: January 19, 1964
- Game time: 1:00 p.m. CST
- Game attendance: 20,016
- TV announcers (ABC): Curt Gowdy and Paul Christman

Game information

First quarter

- East - Cookie Gilchrist 1-yard run (Gino Cappelletti kick) East 7–0
- West - Gino Cappelletti 35-yard field goal East 10–0

Second quarter

- West - Jim Fraser 19-yard field goal East 10–3
- East - Larry Garron 12-yard pass from Babe Parilli (Gino Cappelletti kick) East 17–3
- East - Bill Mathis 3-yard pass from Babe Parilli (Gino Cappelletti kick) East 24–3

Third quarter

- West - Keith Lincoln 64-yard run (Jim Fraser kick) East 24–10
- West - Paul Lowe 5-yard run (Jim Fraser kick) East 24–17

Fourth quarter

- West - Jim Fraser 12-yard field goal East 24–20
- West - Art Powell 25-yard pass from Cotton Davidson (Jim Fraser kick) West 27–24

Top passers

- East – Babe Parilli – 19/30, 228 yards, 2 TD, 2 INT
- West – Tobin Rote – 12/28, 167 yards, 2 INT

Top rushers

- East – Larry Garron – 7 rushes, 41 yards
- West – Keith Lincoln – 14 rushes, 121 yards, TD

Top receivers

- East – Charley Hennigan – 5 receptions, 107 yards
- West – Lance Alworth – 6 receptions, 102 yards

The East dominated the opening half, scoring on four out of six possessions. West starting quarterback Tobin Rote struggled with accuracy and was intercepted twice. A pair of Chargers, Keith Lincoln and Paul Lowe scored rushing touchdowns in the 3rd quarter to get the West back into the game. It was 24–20 with barely a minute to play when Lance Alworth returned a punt to the East 43. Four plays later, backup quarterback Cotton Davidson passed to Raiders teammate Art Powell for the winning touchdown, with Powell making a tumbling catch in the end zone.
