= 1965 American Football League All-Star game =

American football exhibition game

1965 AFL All-Star Game
East	West
14	38
	1	2	3	4	Total
East	0	14	0	0	14
West	7	10	14	7	38
- Date: January 16, 1965
- Stadium: Jeppesen Stadium; Houston, Texas
- Co-MVPs: Keith Lincoln (San Diego Chargers), Willie Brown (Denver Broncos)
- Attendance: 15,446

TV in the United States
- Network: ABC
- Announcers: Curt Gowdy, Paul Christman

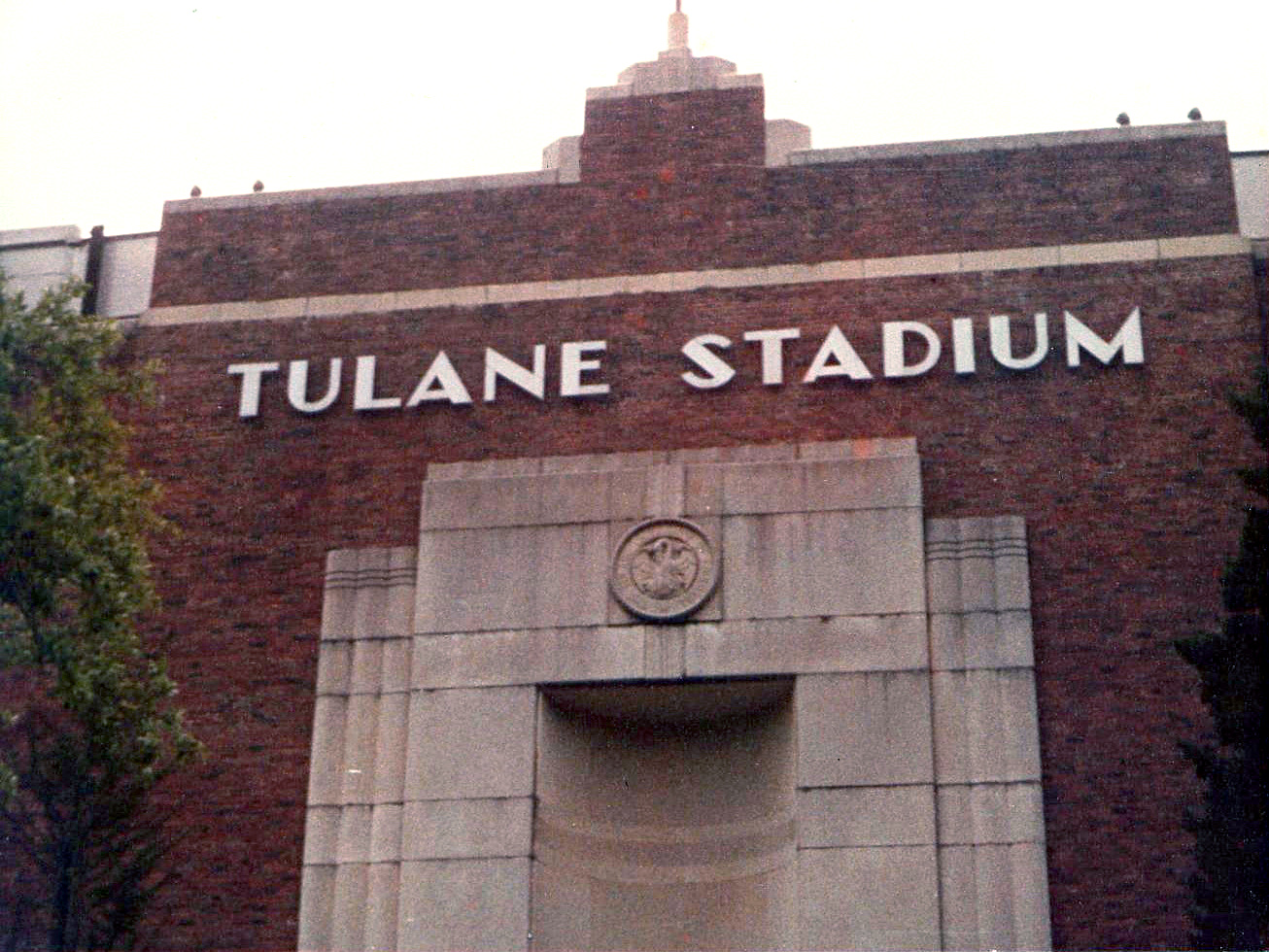
The game had to be moved from Tulane Stadium in New Orleans after several incidents of racism in the city.

The 1965 All-Star Game was the AFL's fourth annual season-ending showpiece, which featured the outstanding performers from the 1964 season. A team drawn from the Western Division defeated their Eastern counterparts by a score of 38–14, scoring 21 unanswered points to pull away in the second half. The head coaches, Sid Gillman and Lou Saban, had faced each other in the 1964 AFL Championship game three weeks earlier, when Saban's Buffalo Bills had defeated Gillman's San Diego Chargers. Running back Keith Lincoln had suffered a cracked rib in that game, but recovered to score two long touchdowns and win the offensive MVP award in the All-Star game, as he had done in the previous year's edition. Defensive back Willie Brown of the Denver Broncos won the defensive MVP award.

Originally scheduled to take place in Tulane Stadium in New Orleans, the game had to be moved at short notice to Jeppesen Stadium, home of the Houston Oilers. The twenty-one African American players on the All-Star teams encountered numerous instances of racism in New Orleans during the build-up to the game, and voted to stage a boycott, with some white players saying they would join with and also boycott the game. In response, the AFL moved the game.

The game was televised by ABC, making it the final professional football game televised by the network until the debut of Monday Night Football in 1970.

== Rosters ==
The rosters were announced on December 30, 1964.

=== Offense ===
Position:	East:	West:
Quarterback	Babe Parilli, Boston; Jack Kemp, Buffalo	Len Dawson, Kansas City; John Hadl, San Diego
Running back	Cookie Gilchrist, Buffalo; Matt Snell, New York; Sid Blanks, Houston; Larry Garron, Boston	Clem Daniels, Oakland; Keith Lincoln, San Diego; Abner Haynes, Kansas City; Mack Lee Hill, Kansas City
Flanker	Elbert Dubenion, Buffalo	Lance Alworth, San Diego
End	Ernie Warlick, Buffalo; Charley Hennigan, Houston; Gino Cappelletti, Boston	Dave Kocourek, San Diego; Art Powell, Raiders; Tom Brooker, Kansas City; Fred Arbanas, Kansas City
Offensive tackle	Stew Barber, Buffalo; Winston Hill, New York; Sherman Plunkett, New York	Jim Tyrer, Kansas City; Ron Mix, San Diego
Offensive guard	Bob Talamini, Houston; Billy Shaw, Buffalo	Wayne Hawkins, Oakland; Walt Sweeney, San Diego
Center	Jon Morris, Boston	Jim Otto, Oakland; Jerry Sturm, Denver

=== Defense ===
Position:	East:	West:
Defensive end	Larry Eisenhauer, Boston; Bob Dee, Boston	Earl Faison, San Diego; Bobby Bell, Kansas City
Defensive tackle	Tom Sestak, Buffalo; Houston Antwine, Boston	Jerry Mays, Kansas City; Ernie Ladd, San Diego; Buck Buchanan, Kansas City
Linebacker	Nick Buoniconti, Boston; Larry Grantham, New York; Tom Addison, Boston; Mike Stratton, Buffalo	Chuck Allen, San Diego; Jim Fraser, Denver; Frank Buncom, San Diego; EJ Holub, Kansas City
Defensive back	Butch Byrd, Buffalo; Pete Jaquess, Houston; Dainard Paulson, New York; Fred Glick, Houston; George Saimes, Buffalo	Dave Grayson, Kansas City; Willie Brown, Denver; Goose Gonsoulin, Denver; Bobby Hunt, Kansas City; Johnny Robinson, Kansas City

== Boycott ==
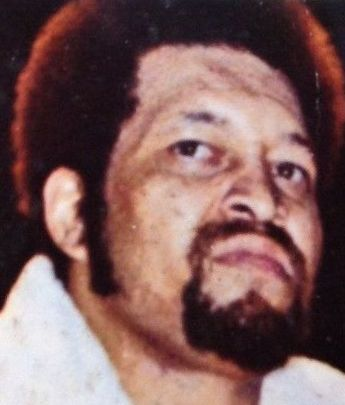
San Diego defensive tackle Ernie Ladd, pictured here in 1973, was a leading advocate for the boycott.

On 21 May 1964, New Orleans businessman David Dixon met with the AFL owners to discuss various proposals that would bring football to his city. He hoped to host either postseason games or the All-Star game in Tulane Stadium, as a stepping stone to establishing a New Orleans franchise in either the AFL or the rival NFL. On 1 July, New Orleans were announced as hosts for the next All-Star game, which had previously been hosted by San Diego's Balboa Stadium.

The game was scheduled to take place six months after the Civil Rights Act of 1964, which aimed to end racial segregation in the United States. Ten days prior to the game, Tulane Stadium had hosted the 1965 Sugar Bowl, which featured eight African American players and was the first Sugar Bowl to be completely integrated; this game went ahead without major incident. When the AFL All-Stars arrived in New Orleans the week before their game, however, the Black players encountered numerous problems, starting at the airport when they tried to hail taxis to take them to their hotels. White taxi drivers refused to give the players rides, or else took them to the wrong location. After reaching their hotels, some of the players went out to sample the French Quarter, but were greeted by overtly racist remarks, and acts such as having their coats taken from racks and thrown on the floor in restaurants. When a group tried to enter nightclub that was playing James Brown music, they were denied entry, with a doorman pointing a gun at Ernie Ladd.

In response to these incidents, all twenty-one Black players gathered to discuss their response in the Roosevelt Hotel, where the West team were stationed. While some wanted to go ahead with the game, Ladd and Cookie Gilchrist were influential figures in persuading the majority to boycott, which they opted to do after a vote. San Diego tackle Ron Mix tried to persuade the Black players to go ahead with the game, but they stood by their decision, with Clem Daniels stating that playing the game would serve to condone the treatment they had received. Mix then joined the boycott in a show of solidarity, as did Buffalo quarterback Jack Kemp.

On January 11, AFL Commissioner Joe Foss announced that due to the boycott, the game would be moved to Houston. Daniels, one of a handful of players who made statements, said, "We are not wanted here so we are leaving."

== The game ==
1965 AFL All-Star Game: East vs. West

Quarter	1	2	3	4	Total
East	0	14	0	0	14
West	7	10	14	7	38

at Jeppesen Stadium in Houston, Texas

- Date: January 16, 1965
- Game time: 1:00 P.M. CST
- Game attendance: 15,446
- TV announcers (ABC): Curt Gowdy and Paul Christman

Game information

First quarter

- West - Keith Lincoln 73-yard pass from Len Dawson (Tom Brooker kick) West 7–0

Second quarter

- West - Clem Daniels 5-yard pass from John Hadl (Tom Brooker kick) West 14–0
- East - Sid Blanks 5-yard run (Gino Cappelletti kick) West 14–7
- West - Tom Brooker 46-yard field goal West 17–7
- East - Nick Buoniconti 17-yard fumble return (Gino Cappelletti kick) West 17–14

Third quarter

- West - Keith Lincoln 80-yard run (Tom Brooker kick) West 24–14

Fourth quarter

- West - Lance Alworth 7-yard pass from John Hadl (Tom Brooker kick) West 31–14
- West - Art Powell 17-yard pass from John Hadl (Tom Brooker kick) West 38–14

The West took the lead on the first play from scrimmage, and kept it for the entire game. Len Dawson's long pass to Keith Lincoln covered 73 yards to open the scoring, though Dawson was knocked out of the game with a bloody nose on his next series. John Hadl replaced Dawson and doubled the lead with a touchdown to wide open Oakland receiver Clem Daniels early in the 2nd quarter. The East responded with a 10-play, 80-yard drive, with Sid Blanks scoring from the 5. Following a Tom Brooker field goal for the West, Nick Buoniconti forced a fumble by Abner Haynes, and returned the ball for a touchdown himself, making it 17–14 at halftime.

Lincoln scored again on the first West drive of the second half, taking a pitchout to the right and outpacing the defense for an 80-yard touchdown run. Later in the 3rd quarter, Hadl was intercepted by Butch Byrd, but the Buffalo defensive back attempted a lateral that was claimed by the West's Art Powell. Hadl and his San Diego teammate Lance Alworth connected for a touchdown on the next play. Hadl completed the scoring with his third touchdown pass, and second to a Raider, with Powell the recipient.

East kicker Gino Cappelletti had a difficult game, missing four kicks and having a fifth blocked (on another occasion, the East turned the ball over on downs after fake field goal didn't work). After the blocked kick, Jerry Maves picked up the ball and lateralled to Bobby Bell, who returned it 72 yards for an apparent touchdown, controversially ruled out as the lateral was ruled to have gone forwards. The West ran their advantage in the series to 4–0. They had a 362–189 offensive yardage advantage, including 153–7 in rushing yardage.

== Aftermath ==
The attendance of 15,446 in Houston was barely a quarter of the 60,000 that David Dixon had believed was attainable in New Orleans. Dixon feared that the incident would hinder New Orleans' plans to win an AFL franchise, either through expansion or through relocation of the Denver Broncos. There was speculation that Atlanta, a rival as a prospective pro football city, might be an indirect beneficiary, with Mayor Ivan Allen Jr. stating that what had happened in New Orleans would not have done so in his city. The AFL showed no interest in retrying New Orleans as a venue, instead announcing Houston and Oakland as the hosts of the next two All-Star games. NFL Commissioner Pete Rozelle, however, retained his interest in the city, and the franchise who would become known as the New Orleans Saints would be announced less than two years after the All-Star boycott, on 1 November 1966.

Reaction to the boycott was mixed in the days that followed it. A New Orleans sportswriter suggested that his city had been unfairly judged based on a handful of incidents, and implied that the players had come looking to cause trouble, and representatives of the city noted that the visiting Syracuse team had reported no problems; journalists from outside the city were more sympathetic to the African Americans' reaction, and noted that the Syracuse players had not mingled with the general populace to the same extent. In the years that followed, the boycott has been seen as a positive action that served as a catalyst for change in New Orleans. Butch Byrd, who had been among the Black players who still wanted to play the game during the meeting in the Roosevelt Hotel, later reflected, "It didn't dawn on me until I read accounts in various newspapers and you could see what an event this really was. We had to take a stand."
