= 1963 Boston Patriots season =

Season of American Football League team the Boston Patriots

- Owner: Billy Sullivan
- Head coach: Mike Holovak
- Home stadium: Fenway Park

Results
- Record: 7–6–1
- Division place: 1st AFL Eastern (playoff)
- Playoffs: Won Divisional Playoffs (at Bills) 26–8; Lost AFL Championship (at Chargers) 10–51
- AFL All-Stars: LB Tom Addison; DT Houston Antwine; LB Nick Buoniconti; WR/K Gino Cappelletti; DE Bob Dee; DE Larry Eisenhauer; RB Larry Garron; DB Ron Hall; G Charlie Long; G Billy Neighbors; QB Babe Parilli

Uniform

The 1963 Boston Patriots season was the franchise's fourth season in the American Football League.

In their first season at Fenway Park, switching from Nickerson Field, the Patriots hovered around the .500 mark all season, and were in position to win the Eastern Division title outright with a victory on their final game. The 35–3 road loss to the defending champion, Kansas City Chiefs, allowed the Buffalo Bills to catch up and both finished at 7–6–1, which required a divisional playoff game, the AFL's first. Both teams had a bye the following week, postponed from the Sunday after the assassination of President Kennedy; the tiebreaker playoff was scheduled for Saturday, December 28, at Buffalo's War Memorial Stadium. The teams split their two games during the regular season, with the home team winning, and the host Bills were slight favorites.

The visiting Patriots won the playoff game 26–8 on a snowy field, with quarterback Babe Parilli throwing two touchdown passes to fullback Larry Garron, and four field goals were added by end Gino Cappelletti. With the win, Boston became Eastern Division champions, while the Western champion San Diego Chargers (11–3) were idle. The AFL championship game was played the next week in southern California on January 5, where San Diego routed the Patriots 51–10 at Balboa Stadium.

This was Boston's only postseason appearance during the AFL's ten years; the Patriots' next playoff game was in 1976 (as a wild card) and the next division title came in 1978.

== Staff ==
1963 Boston Patriots staff
| Front office: President – Billy Sullivan; Head coaches: Head coach – Mike Holovak; Offensive coaches: Offensive line – Art Spinney | Defensive coaches: Defensive line – Marion Campbell; Defensive backfield – Fred Bruney; Strength and conditioning: Trainer - William T “Billy” Bates |

== Roster ==
Boston Patriots 1963 roster
| Quarterbacks: 15 Babe Parilli; 14 Tom Yewcic P; Running backs: 30 Jim Crawford; 31 Harry Crump; 40 Larry Garron; 32 Billy Lott; 36 Tom Neumann; Wide receivers: 20 Gino Cappelletti K; 81 Jim Colclough; 84 Art Graham; Tight ends: 86 Tony Romeo | Offensive linemen: 54 Walt Cudzik C; 70 Milt Graham T; 76 Charlie Long G; 73 Billy Neighbors G; 77 Don Oakes T; 67 Dave Watson G; 50 Bob Yates T/C; Defensive linemen: 65 Houston Antwine DT; 72 Larry Eisenhauer DE; 89 Bob Dee DE; 79 Jim Lee Hunt DT/DE; 75 Jess Richardson DT | Linebackers: 53 Tom Addison OLB; 85 Nick Buoniconti MLB; 51 Don McKinnon OLB/MLB; 80 Jack Rudolph OLB; Defensive backs: 24 Dick Felt CB; 23 Ron Hall SS; 25 Ross O'Hanley FS; 34 Chuck Shonta CB; 45 Thomas Stephens SS; 21 Bob Suci CB | Reserve list: 22 Ron Burton RB (IR); 38 Al Snyder WR (IR); 48 Don Webb CB (IR) |

== Schedule ==
| Week | Date | Opponent | Result | Record | Venue | Attendance | Recap |
|---|---|---|---|---|---|---|---|
| 1 | September 8 | **New York Jets** | **W** 38–14 | 1–0 | Alumni Stadium | 24,120 | Recap |
| 2 | September 14 | at San Diego Chargers | **L** 13–17 | 1–1 | Balboa Stadium | 26,097 | Recap |
| 3 | September 22 | at Oakland Raiders | **W** 20–14 | 2–1 | Frank Youell Field | 17,131 | Recap |
| 4 | September 29 | at Denver Broncos | **L** 10–14 | 2–2 | Bears Stadium | 18,636 | Recap |
| 5 | October 5 | at **New York Jets** | **L** 24–31 | 2–3 | Polo Grounds | 16,769 | Recap |
| 6 | October 11 | Oakland Raiders | **W** 20–14 | 3–3 | Fenway Park | 26,494 | Recap |
| 7 | October 18 | Denver Broncos | **W** 40–21 | 4–3 | Fenway Park | 25,418 | Recap |
| 8 | October 26 | at **Buffalo Bills** | **L** 21–28 | 4–4 | War Memorial Stadium | 29,243 | Recap |
| 9 | November 1 | **Houston Oilers** | **W** 45–3 | 5–4 | Fenway Park | 31,185 | Recap |
| 10 | November 10 | San Diego Chargers | **L** 6–7 | 5–5 | Fenway Park | 28,402 | Recap |
| 11 | November 17 | Kansas City Chiefs | **T** 24–24 | 5–5–1 | Fenway Park | 17,200 | Recap |
| | November 24 | AFL games postponed to December 22 | | | | | |
| 12 | December 1 | **Buffalo Bills** | **W** 17–7 | 6–5–1 | Fenway Park | 16,981 | Recap |
| 13 | December 7 | at **Houston Oilers** | **W** 46–28 | 7–5–1 | Jeppesen Stadium | 23,462 | Recap |
| 14 | December 14 | at Kansas City Chiefs | **L** 3–35 | 7–6–1 | Municipal Stadium | 12,598 | Recap |
| 15 | December 22 | Bye week, (originally December 1) | | | | | |
Note: Intra-division opponents are in **bold** text.

== Standings ==
AFL Eastern Division
| | W | L | T | PCT | DIV | PF | PA | STK |
|---|---|---|---|---|---|---|---|---|
| Boston Patriots | 7 | 6 | 1 | .538 | 4–2 | 327 | 257 | L1 |
| Buffalo Bills | 7 | 6 | 1 | .538 | 3–3 | 304 | 291 | W2 |
| Houston Oilers | 6 | 8 | 0 | .429 | 3–3 | 302 | 372 | L4 |
| New York Jets | 5 | 8 | 1 | .385 | 2–4 | 249 | 399 | L3 |

Note: Tie games were not officially counted in the standings in the AFL.

== Postseason ==
| Round | Date | Opponent | Result | Record | Venue | Attendance | Game recap |
|---|---|---|---|---|---|---|---|
| Division | December 28 | at Buffalo Bills | W 26–8 | 1–0 | War Memorial Stadium | 33,044 | Recap |
| Championship | January 5, 1964 | at San Diego Chargers | L 10–51 | 1–1 | Balboa Stadium | 30,127 | Recap |
