= Art Graham =

American football player (born 1941)

No. 84
- Position: Wide receiver

Personal information
- Born: July 31, 1941 (age 85); Somerville, Massachusetts, U.S.
- Listed height: 6 ft 1 in (1.85 m)
- Listed weight: 205 lb (93 kg)

Career information
- High school: Matignon (MA)
- College: Boston College
- NFL draft: 1963: 11th round, 149th overall pick
- AFL draft: 1963: 1st round, 7th overall pick

Career history
- Boston Patriots (1963-1968)

Awards and highlights
- Boston Patriots All-1960s Team; First-team All-East (1962); Scanlan Award (1962)

Career AFL statistics
- Receptions: 199
- Receiving yards: 3,107
- Touchdowns: 20
- Stats at Pro Football Reference

Arthur William Graham III (born July 31, 1941) is an American former professional football player who was a wide receiver in the American Football League (AFL) for six seasons with the Boston Patriots of the American Football League (AFL). He was named Patriots player of the year in 1963 after averaging 26.2 yards per catch and scoring five touchdowns. Drafted by both the Patriots and the Cleveland Browns, the Patriots offered him $10,000 to play for them. He played college football for the Boston College Eagles.

== Early life ==
Graham was born on July 31, 1941, in Somerville, Massachusetts. His father Art (Skinny) Graham II was an outfielder for 21 games for the Boston Red Sox during the 1934-35 seasons. He attended Matignon High School in Cambridge.

He was All-Scholastic in football at end, in basketball at guard, and in baseball playing outfield. As a baseball player he was known for his baserunning hustle and defensive play. Nationally he was named first-team All-American as an end in football and as a guard in basketball. He was captain of the 1958-59 basketball team as a senior. In February 1959, he led Matignon's basketball team to the Class A championship of the New England Catholic tournament, scoring 22 points in a 63–50 championship game victory. He was named Most Valuable Player in that tournament.

In 1958, Graham was named to Massachusetts' All-Catholic team in football. He was the highest scoring end in the state (100 points). He was selected as one of two most outstanding players on that team. In 1959, he was named an All-Catholic All-American in basketball.

== College career ==
He played college football for the Boston College Eagles. He was a wide receiver on the football team for three years (1960-62). As a sophomore he caught 14 passes for 221 yards, and as a junior he had 15 receptions for 225 yards and two touchdowns. Graham was named team captain as a senior in 1962.

His senior year was his best season at Boston College. He had 41 receptions for 823 yards and seven touchdowns. Graham's 823 receiving yards were fourth highest nationally, his 20.1 yards per reception fifth best nationally, and his 41 receptions tied for ninth most nationally. At the time, his 41 receptions also set a Boston College single season reception record. Boston College's starting quarterback in 1962 was future NFL quarterback Jack Concannon, who had a 53.6% pass completion rate and tied for the most touchdown passes in the nation (15).

The Associated Press (AP) named Graham to its All-East Football Team in 1961 and 1962. In 1962, the AP selected Graham first-team All-New England at end, and United Press International (UPI) selected him to its All-New England Football Team as well. He was also named a Catholic All-American at end in 1962. He was selected to play in the East-West Shrine Game in 1962. When he graduated, in addition to holding the school's single season pass reception record he also held the school record for total career receptions.

Graham was an outfielder on Boston College's baseball team. In 1961, his team won the New England baseball championship and played in the 1961 College World Series. He hit a home run against the eventual champion University of Southern California Trojan team. Graham was also a reserve on Boston College's 1961-62 basketball team.

== Professional career ==
The Boston Patriots selected Graham in the first round of the 1963 AFL draft, with the seventh overall pick. The Cleveland Browns selected him in the 11th round of the 1963 NFL draft, 149th overall. The Patriots quickly offered Graham a $10,000 signing bonus, but Graham considered playing with the Browns, believing he was a better receiver than their first-round draft pick. He ultimately chose the Patriots.

Patriots coach Mike Holovak had been Boston College's head football coach from 1951 to 1959. Patriots president and owner Bill Sullivan stated that a number of NFL teams would have taken Graham in the first round of the 1963 NFL draft, but the NFL teams assumed Graham would join Holovak, who both coached and played at Boston College.

As a rookie in 1963, Graham averaged a team record 26.2 yards per reception, with 550 yards on 21 receptions and five touchdowns. He replaced All-Star receiver Jim Colclough (another Boston College graduate) as a starting receiver after the season's first game. Colclough had not played well, but was hampered by a hamstring injury. In the Patriots opening 1963 game, Graham had two receptions for 48 yards, including a 33-yard touchdown pass from Babe Parilli. In an early October game against the New York Jets, he had six receptions for 156 yards and two touchdowns. He had touchdown receptions of 40, 57 and 77 yards that year, the latter setting a team record. During the season, however, Graham's playing time was limited by his own injuries. He only started two games.

He was named the Patriots' Rookie of the Year in 1963. In the Patriots 26–8 playoff victory over the Buffalo Bills, Graham had a 22-yard pass reception and two punt returns for 34 yards (including a 28-yard return). He had two receptions for 68 yards in the Patriots 51–10 loss to the San Diego Chargers in the 1963 AFL Championship Game.

In 1964, Graham started 12 games at receiver, with 45 receptions for 720 yards and six touchdowns. He missed two games while injured in 1964. Graham’s career-best game came on November 6, 1964, in a Patriots 25–24 victory over the Houston Oilers, when Graham caught eight passes for 167 yards. The Oilers were ahead 24–22 with 32 seconds left in the game, but the Patriots' Gino Cappelletti kicked a field goal with one second remaining for the victory. On November 29, 1964, Graham caught an 80-yard touchdown pass from Babe Parilli in the Patriots 34–17 win over the Oilers.

Graham also had an impact on special teams in 1964. In a September 13, 1964 game against the Oakland Raiders he made a game-saving tackle on a punt return. Graham had been the first man down the field in punt coverage, and had to turn around and chase the Raiders' Hoot Gibson who had fielded the punt. Gibson had run the punt back 52 yards when Graham caught him and prevented a touchdown. Graham duplicated this feat the following week against the San Diego Chargers in preserving a win for the Patriots, 33–28. With just minutes to go in the game, future Hall of Famer Lance Alworth had returned a punt 43 yards, with Graham racing behind him. Graham dove and grabbed Alworth's ankle from behind at the Patriots five-yard line, preventing a touchdown. The Chargers could not score a touchdown on the ensuing series, and lost the game after only kicking a field goal. Chargers' star running back Keith Lincoln could understand Graham catching Gibson a week earlier, but was stunned Graham could catch the fast Alworth, and praised Graham as a great athlete.

The Patriots finished 10–3–1 in 1964, but fell to 4–8–2 in 1965. Graham only started six games in 1965, and was described as injury prone. He had 25 receptions for 316 yards, averaging a career-low 12.6 yards per catch. He started 13 games in 1966, and had a career-high 51 receptions, to go along with 673 receiving yards and four touchdown catches. The Patriots finished the season 8–4–2.

In a tie-game against the Kansas City Chiefs on November 20, 1966, Graham had a record-setting 11 receptions for 134 yards and two touchdowns (21 and 38 yards). Graham had been in a car accident less than a week before the game, and it was unclear if he would even be able to put on a helmet and play because of the stitches in his head. The 11 receptions stood as a Patriots team record until broken by Ben Coates in November 1994 with 12 (the current Patriots record is 16, jointly held by Wes Welker and Troy Brown). Graham's 11 receptions came against a 1966 Chiefs team that had the best record in the AFL and went on to play in the first Super Bowl. They had a defense that included future Hall of Famers Buck Buchanan, Bobby Bell, and Johnny Robinson; and first-team AFL All-Decade Team defensive end Jerry Mays.

In a 20–14 win over the Miami Dolphins on November 27, 1966, Graham caught a 22-yard touchdown pass, even though he was only wearing one shoe when he reached the end zone. Dolphins' cornerback Dick Westmoreland had tried to tackle Graham, and as Graham escaped the tackle Westmoreland was left holding Graham's shoe. (It would take another 20 years before the Patriots would win another game played in Miami, Florida, in a January 1986 playoff game, after losing 18 consecutive times in Miami.)

The Patriots regressed to 3–10–1 in 1967. Graham started 12 games and had 41 receptions for 606 yards and four touchdowns. His 79-yard touchdown reception against the Denver Broncos, in the first quarter of the first game of the 1967 AFL season, was the longest pass reception in the AFL that year. In 1968, Graham had injuries going into the season and was placed on the injured waiver list during the season. He started only six games and had the lowest reception (16) and yardage (242) totals of his career, in what would be his final season.

The Patriots cut Graham in early September 1969, in what coach Clive Rush called "'a most difficult decision'". At the time, along with his 11 reception game, Graham's 51 receptions in 1966 were still a team record. Overall, he played six years for the Patriots, starting 51 games. He had 199 receptions for 3,107 yards and 20 touchdowns.

== AFL career statistics ==
Legend
	Led the league
**Bold**	Career high

=== Regular season ===
Year	Team	Games		Receiving				
Year	Team	GP	GS	Rec	Yds	Avg	Lng	TD
1963	BOS	14	2	21	550	**26.2**	77	5
1964	BOS	14	12	45	**720**	16.0	**80**	**6**
1965	BOS	10	6	25	316	12.6	33	0
1966	BOS	14	13	**51**	673	13.2	42	4
1967	BOS	12	12	41	606	14.8	79	4
1968	BOS	11	6	16	242	15.1	34	1
Career		75	51	199	3,107	15.6	80	20

=== Playoffs ===
Year	Team	Games		Receiving				
Year	Team	GP	GS	Rec	Yds	Avg	Lng	TD
1963	BOS	2	0	3	90	30.0	45	0
Career		2	0	3	90	30.0	45	0

== Honors ==
Graham is a member of the Patriots' All-1960s (AFL) team. In 1970, he was inducted into Boston College's Varsity Club Hall of Fame.

== Personal life ==
Graham worked for 34 years as a probation officer in Somerville, both during and after his football career.

== See also ==
- List of American Football League players
