= 1963 American Football League Championship Game =

Coordinates: 32.7205°N 117.1505°W

1963 AFL Championship Game
Boston Patriots (Eastern) (7–6–1)	San Diego Chargers (Western) (11–3)
10	51
Head coach: Mike Holovak	Head coach: Sid Gillman
	1	2	3	4	Total
BOS	7	3	0	0	10
SD	21	10	7	13	51
- Date: January 5, 1964
- Stadium: Balboa Stadium; San Diego, California
- MVP: Keith Lincoln, running back
- Attendance: 30,127

TV in the United States
- Network: ABC
- Announcers: Curt Gowdy, Paul Christman

The 1963 AFL Championship Game was the fourth American Football League (AFL) title game. The Western Division champion San Diego Chargers won 51–10 over the Eastern Division champion Boston Patriots. The Chargers' Keith Lincoln was named the game's most valuable player (MVP).

At the end of the regular season, the Chargers (11–3) won the Western Division for the third time in the four-year existence of the AFL. In the Eastern Division, the Patriots and the Buffalo Bills had identical 7–6–1 records, which required a tiebreaker playoff game on December 28 in Buffalo.

== Eastern Division playoff ==
In their final regular season games on Saturday, December 14, Boston lost and Buffalo won to draw even in the standings. Three-time division winner Houston (6–6) controlled their own destiny, but lost the next day and were eliminated. Buffalo and Boston had two weeks to prepare for the playoff, as their bye weeks were postponed from November 24 to December 22, due to the assassination of President Kennedy.

The game was played on Saturday, December 28, as the following day was the 1963 NFL Championship Game. On a slippery field at War Memorial Stadium in Buffalo with an inch of snow, visiting Boston led 16–0 at halftime and won 26–8. Quarterback Babe Parilli threw a touchdown pass in each half to fullback Larry Garron and Gino Cappelletti made four field goals for the Patriots. The Bills' sole score was a 93-yard touchdown pass play in the third quarter with a two-point conversion, which cut the lead to eight points. The AFL would not need a playoff to determine a division winner until 1968.

Boston Patriots 26, Buffalo Bills 8

Quarter	1	2	3	4	Total
Patriots	10	6	0	10	26
Bills	0	0	8	0	8

at War Memorial Stadium, Buffalo, New York

- Date: December 28, 1963
- Game time: 1:05 p.m. EST
- Game weather: 20 °F (−7 °C), relative humidity 76%,
  wind 11 mph (18 km/h), wind chill 9 °F (−13 °C)
- Game attendance: 33,044
- TV: ABC
- ProFootballReference.com

Game information
Scoring
- First quarter
  - BOS – Gino Cappelletti 28-yard field goal. Patriots 3–0
  - BOS – Larry Garron 59-yard pass from Babe Parilli (Cappeletti kick). Patriots 10–0
- Second quarter
  - BOS – Gino Cappelletti 12-yard field goal. Patriots 13–0
  - BOS – Gino Cappelletti 33-yard field goal. Patriots 16–0
- Third quarter
  - BUF – Elbert Dubenion 93-yard pass from Daryle Lamonica (John Tracey pass from Lamonica). Patriots 16–8
- Fourth quarter
  - BOS – Larry Garron 17-yard pass from Babe Parilli (Cappeletti kick). Patriots 23–8
  - BOS – Gino Cappelletti 36-yard field goal. Patriots 26–8

== Championship Game ==
Idle during the week of Eastern Division playoff, well-rested San Diego was a touchdown favorite at home to win the AFL. Fullback Keith Lincoln performed tremendously and led the Chargers to a 51–10 rout of Boston. Named the game's MVP, he rushed for 206 yards on 13 carries, led the team with 123 yards in receiving, and completed a pass for 20 yards.

The game was not a sellout; the attendance of 30,127 was several thousand under Balboa Stadium's capacity.

The Chargers' championship win 62 years ago is noted for being the only major sports title for the city of San Diego, the longest drought for a major American city. The Chargers played in San Diego through 2016, then returned to Los Angeles in 2017. The Patriots' first league championship came in the 2001 season in Super Bowl XXXVI.

San Diego Chargers 51, Boston Patriots 10

Quarter	1	2	3	4	Total
Patriots	7	3	0	0	10
Chargers	21	10	7	13	51

at Balboa Stadium, San Diego, California

- Date: January 5, 1964
- Game time: 1:30 p.m. PST
- Game weather: 57 °F (14 °C), relative humidity 26%, wind 10 mph (16 km/h)
- Game attendance: 30,127
- TV announcers (ABC): Curt Gowdy, Paul Christman
- Pro-Football-Reference.com

Game information

Scoring

- First quarter
  - SD – Tobin Rote 2-yard rush (George Blair kick). Chargers 7–0
  - SD – Keith Lincoln 67-yard rush (Blair kick). Chargers 14–0
  - BOS – Larry Garron 7-yard rush (Gino Cappelletti kick). Chargers 14–7
  - SD – Paul Lowe 58-yard rush (Blair kick). Chargers 21–7
- Second quarter
  - SD – George Blair 11-yard field goal. Chargers 24–7
  - BOS – Gino Cappelletti 15-yard field goal. Chargers 24–10
  - SD – Don Norton 14-yard pass from Tobin Rote (Blair kick). Chargers 31–10
- Third quarter
  - SD – Lance Alworth 48-yard pass from Tobin Rote (Blair kick). Chargers 38–10
- Fourth quarter
  - SD – Keith Lincoln 25-yard pass from John Hadl (pass failed). Chargers 44–10
  - SD – John Hadl 1-yard run (Blair kick). Chargers 51–10

Top passers

- BOS – Babe Parilli – 14/29, 189 yards, 1 INT
- SD – Tobin Rote – 10/15, 173 yards, 2 TD

Top rushers

- BOS – Harry Crump – 7 rushes, 18 yards
- SD – Keith Lincoln – 13 rushes, 206 yards, 1 TD

Top receivers

- BOS – Gino Cappelletti – 2 receptions, 72 yards
- SD – Keith Lincoln – 7 receptions, 123 yards, 1 TD

=== Starting lineups ===
Hall of Fame inductee

Boston	Position	San Diego
Offense
Babe Parilli	QB	Tobin Rote
Ron Burton	HB	Paul Lowe
Larry Garron	FB	Keith Lincoln
Jim Colclough	FL	Lance Alworth
Gino Cappelletti	SE	Don Norton
Tony Romeo	TE	Dave Kocourek
Don Oakes	LT	Ernie Wright
Charley Long	LG	Sam DeLuca
Walt Cudzik	C	Don Rogers
Billy Neighbors	RG	Pat Shea
Milt Graham	RT	Ron Mix
Defense
Larry Eisenhauer	LDE	Earl Faison
Jess Richardson	LDT	Henry Schmidt
Houston Antwine	RDT	George Gross
Bob Dee	RDE	Bob Petrich
Tom Addison	LLB	Emil Karas
Nick Buoniconti	MLB	Chuck Allen
Jack Rudolph	RLB	Paul Maguire
Dick Felt	LCB	Bud Whitehead
Bob Suci	RCB	Dick Harris
Ross O'Hanley	SS	George Blair
Ron Hall	FS	Gary Glick

== Statistics ==
Statistics	Patriots	Chargers
First downs	14	21
Rushing yards	75	318
Yards per carry	4.6	9.9
Passing yards	228	305
Sack Yds Lost	6–42	2–13
Total yards	261	610
Fumbles-Lost	1–0	1–1
Turnovers	2	1
Penalties–Yards	1–18	6–30

== Players' shares ==
The attendance in San Diego was nearly 8,000 lower than the previous year's game in Houston, but the players' shares were up slightly with increased television revenue. The winning Chargers players each made around $2,500, while the Patriots received about $1,700 each. These shares were less than half of those for the NFL title game in 1963, at approximately $6,000 and $4,200 each.

== See also ==
- 1963 AFL season
- AFL Championship Games
- 1963 NFL Championship Game

Preceded by Dallas Texans; 1962 AFL Champions	San Diego Chargers; American Football League Champions; 1963	Succeeded by Buffalo Bills; 1964 AFL Champions
