= Tom Fussell =

American football player (born 1945)

No. 83
- Position: Defensive end

Personal information
- Born: May 25, 1945 (age 81); Cleveland, Ohio, U.S.
- Listed height: 6 ft 3 in (1.91 m)
- Listed weight: 250 lb (113 kg)

Career information
- High school: Istrouma (Baton Rouge, Louisiana)
- College: LSU
- NFL draft: 1967: 8th round, 206th overall pick

Career history
- Boston Patriots (1967)
- Stats at Pro Football Reference

Thomas Paul Fussell (born May 25, 1945) is an American former professional football player who was a defensive end for one season with the Boston Patriots of the American Football League (AFL) in 1967. He played in 12 games that season, starting in two. He attended Louisiana State University, where he played college football for the LSU Tigers. Following his senior season at LSU, he was invited to play in the 1966 East–West Shrine Game.

Fussell was born in Cleveland, Ohio, and attended Istrouma High School in Baton Rouge, Louisiana.
