= Jon Morris =

American football player (1942–2026)

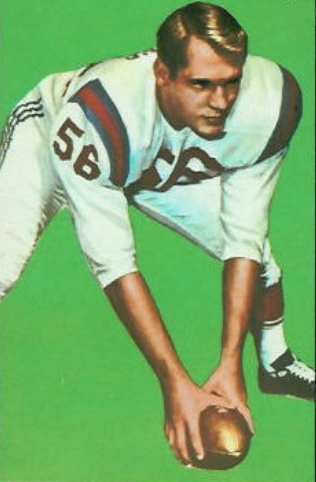
- Topps card for Morris, 1966

No. 56, 63
- Position: Center

Personal information
- Born: April 5, 1942; Washington, D.C., U.S.
- Died: October 15, 2026 (aged 84); Meredith, New Hampshire, U.S.
- Listed height: 6 ft 4 in (1.93 m)
- Listed weight: 254 lb (115 kg)

Career information
- High school: Gonzaga College (Washington, D.C.)
- College: Holy Cross (1961–1963)
- NFL draft: 1964: 2nd round, 27th overall pick
- AFL draft: 1964: 4th round, 29th overall pick

Career history
- Boston / New England Patriots (1964–1974); Detroit Lions (1975–1977); Chicago Bears (1978)

Awards and highlights
- First-team All-AFL (1966); 4× Second-team All-AFL (1964, 1965, 1967, 1969); 6× AFL All-Star (1964–1969); Pro Bowl (1970); AFL All-Time Second-team; Boston Patriots All-1960s Team; New England Patriots 35th Anniversary Team; New England Patriots 50th Anniversary Team; New England Patriots Hall of Fame; First-team All-Eastern (1963); Second-team All-Eastern (1962)

Career AFL/NFL statistics
- Games played: 182
- Games started: 167
- Fumble recoveries: 2
- Stats at Pro Football Reference

Jon Nicholson Morris (April 5, 1942 – October 15, 2026) was an American professional football player who was a center for 15 seasons in the American Football League (AFL) and National Football League (NFL). He played college football for the Holy Cross Crusaders before playing professionally for the Boston / New England Patriots, Detroit Lions and Chicago Bears. He was a six-time AFL All-Star with the Patriots.

== Early life ==
Morris was born on April 5, 1942, in Washington, D.C. He later resided in Chevy Chase, Maryland. He attended the Gonzaga College High School, a Jesuit school, in Washington, D.C.

He was a three-sport athlete in football, basketball and baseball. He was an All-Metropolitan football player, and played both offense (center) and defense (linebacker). As a junior in 1958, he was selected to the School Sports Association (SSA) first-team All-Prep football team at center. In 1959 as a senior, the 6 ft 3 in (1.9 m) 200 pound (90.7 kg) Morris received the first-team SSA honor again at center. He was runner-up for football player of the year honors in 1959.

Morris led Gonzaga's football team to the city championship in 1959. He was also named to the All-Catholic league basketball team that year; and was an All-League first baseman in baseball as a senior, with a batting average among the top five in the league.

He was the News Scholastic Sports Association Outstanding Athlete of the Year in 1960, for his accomplishments in football, baseball and basketball during the 1959-60 school year.

== College career ==
Morris attended College of the Holy Cross in Worcester, Massachusetts, graduating in 1964. He started at center and linebacker for three seasons of college football with the Holy Cross Crusaders, and was team captain as a senior. As a senior, he was 6 ft 3 in (1.9 m) and 225 pounds (102 kg).

He was named both the Holy Cross Varsity Club Athlete of the Year and Holy Cross Lineman of the Year in the 1963 season. Morris was selected by the Associated Press (AP) at center to its second-team All-East team in 1962, and was selected first-team AP All-East center in his senior year (1963). Morris was a two-time first-team All-New England selection.

Morris was a co-captain of the North team in the Senior Bowl, playing center, and played in the College All-Star Game against the Chicago Bears in August 1964. He was named a second-team Catholic College All-American at center his senior year. He was named a second-team center on the Central Press Captains' All-American team, behind the first team's Dick Butkus.

== Professional career ==
=== Boston/New England Patriots ===
Morris was selected by the Green Bay Packers in the second round, with the 27th overall pick, of the 1964 NFL draft. However, Morris chose to play with the Boston Patriots, who selected him in the fourth round, with the 29th overall pick, of the 1964 AFL draft. He chose the Patriots after speaking with their coach, Mike Holovak. He signed with the Patriots in December 1963. Intending to eventually enter a law school in Boston also influenced his decision to choose the Patriots over Vince Lombardi's Packers. Morris went on to play 11 years for the Patriots (1964–74), often considered the only quality offensive lineman on the team, and served as a team captain .

He was an AFL All-Star six times, 1964 through 1969, and was a Pro Bowl center in 1970. He was the first Patriot to be selected for the Pro Bowl after the AFL/NFL merger. He was selected by the Associated Press (AP) to its All-AFL second team in 1964-65 and 1969, and to its first team in 1966. United Press International (UPI) named him its second-team All-AFL center in 1965. He played in 130 regular season games for the Patriots, starting 125, the eighth best individual record in club history.

Morris was a full-time starter at center beginning in his 1964 rookie season. He received two votes for AFL Rookie-of-the Year. The Patriots were 10–3–1 that season, the best record the Patriots had during Morris's tenure with the team. Toward the end of Morris's rookie season in Boston, Holovak said he had expected Morris to be a good player, but his play exceeded Holovak's hopes. Morris was selected to play in the AFL All-Star Game in his rookie season, and started for the East Division at center. The Associated Press (AP) and Newspaper Enterprise Association (NEA) named him second-team All-AFL that year. The Oakland Raiders' future Pro Football Hall of Fame center Jim Otto was the first-team All-AFL center that year.

Otto was selected to the All-AFL first team at center every year of the AFL's independent existence (1960–69), and was the Hall of Fame's all-time AFL first-team center. In 1964, Morris missed by a single vote being named first-team All-AFL center by the AFL itself. In 1966, the Associated Press chose Morris as its first-team All-AFL center, over Otto, in a close vote. This was considered the biggest upset in voting for that team. The other major entities selecting All-AFL members chose Otto first and Morris second. In The Sporting News player poll that year, Otto was first and Morris second. Morris was named the second-team All-Time AFL center for that league's decade of existence in the 1960s.

He played in 127 or 128 games for the Patriots until suffering a knee injury early in the 1973 season, on the second play of the team's second game of the season, against the Kansas City Chiefs on September 23, 1973. He only played in two games that season, and then only three games as a backup center the following year (1974).

=== Detroit Lions and Chicago Bears ===
In July 1975, Morris was traded to the Detroit Lions for a 6th round draft choice. During the preseason with the Lions in August 1975, he played his first full game in nearly two years. Morris played three years (1975–1977) with the Lions, starting all 14 games every season. He was elected by Lions teammates as their Offensive Player of the Year in 1975. In 1977, he was the Lions' team leader in minutes played and was voted the team's Most Valuable Player. The Chicago Bears signed Morris as a free agent in August 1978, and he played his fifteenth and final professional season as a backup center with the Chicago Bears in 1978. Morris announced his retirement in January 1979.

=== Career ===
Morris recovered several fumbles during his career. The first was a fumble by running back Ron Burton in the Boston Patriots 24–7 victory over the Kansas City Chiefs at Fenway Park on October 23, 1964. In 1966, he recovered a fumble by running back Larry Garron in the Patriots 27–27 tie with the Kansas City Chiefs at Municipal Stadium on November 20. He also recovered a fumble by fullback Jim Nance in a 16–0 loss to the Houston Oilers at Fenway on October 13, 1968.

He wore No. 56 for the Patriots, as did Pro Football Hall of Fame linebacker Andre Tippett.

== Broadcasting ==
After retiring from the NFL in 1978, Morris became a radio broadcast color commentator for the Patriots, working alongside play-by-play radio broadcaster Gil Santos. Morris worked as the color commentator on Patriots radio broadcasts from 1979 to 1987, followed by color analysis of NFL games for NBC television. In 1987, his radio broadcast partner was the legendary Curt Gowdy, winner of the Pro Football Hall of Fame's Pete Rozelle Award and the namesake of the Naismith Memorial Basketball Hall of Fame's Curt Gowdy Media Award.

== Personal life and death ==
His father was John D. Morris, a longtime reporter and editor in the Washington bureau of The New York Times.

Jon Morris died in October 2026, at the age of 84, following a battle with dementia.

== Honors ==
Morris was named to the AFL All-Time second-team, and to the fan-selected Boston Patriots All-1960s Team.

In 2011, Jon Morris was selected by a senior selection committee as a member of the New England Patriots Hall of Fame. In 2014, he was named to the Patriots All-Time Team, during its 55th anniversary year. In 1979, he was named first-team center on the Patriots All-Time Team in celebration of the team's 20th anniversary.

The 1776 Club (the Patriots' fan club), named Morris the team's 1964 Rookie-of-the Year, and gave Morris its Unsung Hero Award in 1965 and 1972.

He was inducted into the Holy Cross Hall of Fame in 1973, and was an inaugural inductee of the Gonzaga College High School Athletic Hall of Fame in 1983. He was joined in 1991 by his brother, Will, who was a quarterback at Gonzaga and for the Maryland Terrapins as well serving as Gonzaga head football coach from 1975 to 1978.

== See also ==
- List of American Football League players
