= Tom Brooker =

Australian rules footballer, born 1908

Personal information
- Full name: Tom Brooker
- Born: 27 June 1908
- Died: 22 July 1988 (aged 80)
- Original team: Port Melbourne
- Height: 173 cm (5 ft 8 in)
- Weight: 73 kg (161 lb)

Playing career^{1}
Years	Club	Games (Goals)
1936	North Melbourne	2 (2)
- ^{1} Playing statistics correct to the end of 1936.

Tom Brooker (27 June 1908 – 22 July 1988) was an Australian rules footballer who played with North Melbourne in the Victorian Football League (VFL).
