= Terry Swanson =

American football player (born 1944)

No. 36, 41
- Position: Punter

Personal information
- Born: January 8, 1944 (age 82); Cambridge, Massachusetts
- Listed height: 6 ft 0 in (1.83 m)
- Listed weight: 210 lb (95 kg)

Career information
- High school: Belmont
- College: UMass
- NFL draft: 1967: undrafted

Career history
- Boston Patriots (1967–1968); Cincinnati Bengals (1969)
- Stats at Pro Football Reference

Terry G. Swanson (born January 8, 1944) is an American former football punter who played for the Boston Patriots and the Cincinnati Bengals of the American Football League (AFL). He played college football at University of Massachusetts Amherst.
