= Jim Colclough =

American football player (1936–2004)

No. 91, 81
- Position: Flanker-split end

Personal information
- Born: March 31, 1936; Medford, Massachusetts, U.S.
- Died: May 16, 2004 (aged 68); Boston, Massachusetts, U.S.
- Listed height: 6 ft 0 in (1.83 m)
- Listed weight: 185 lb (84 kg)

Career information
- High school: Quincy (Quincy, Massachusetts)
- College: Boston College
- NFL draft: 1959: 30th round, 353rd overall pick

Career history

Playing
- Montreal Alouettes (1959); Boston Patriots (1960–1968)

Coaching
- Boston State (1978–1979) Head coach

Awards and highlights
- AFL All-Star (1962); Boston Patriots All-1960s Team

Career AFL statistics
- Receptions: 283
- Receiving yards: 5,001
- Touchdowns: 39
- Stats at Pro Football Reference

Head coaching record
- Regular season: 10–8–0 (.556)

James Michael Colclough (/ˈkoʊlklɔː/ KOHL-klaw) (March 31, 1936 – May 16, 2004) was an American football flanker-split end, member of the original Boston Patriots team in the American Football League (AFL) and later head coach of the Division III Boston State College football team. Known as Coleslaw, a spin-off his last name, Colclough played college football at Boston College, one season as a defensive back in the Canadian Football League (CFL) with the Montreal Alouettes in 1959 and nine more with the Patriots from 1960 to 1968, including the AFL's inaugural 1960 season.

In 2009, Colclough was named to the Patriots' 1960s All-Decade Team. His 17.7-yards average per reception ranks third in franchise history and his 39 touchdown catches are fourth on its all-time list.

Among receivers, Colclough was one of the premier deep threats in Patriots history. His ten receptions for touchdowns and 21.7 yards per reception in 1962 earned him a spot on the East Division All-Star team. His career highlights included a seven-reception, 142-yard, two-touchdown performance in a 45-17 romp over the Denver Broncos on September 16, 1961, at Nickerson Field. Overall, he had 283 receptions for 5,001 yards and 39 touchdowns in his AFL career.

In 1970, Colclough partnered with two of the most eligible bachelors in professional sports, Derek Sanderson of the NHL's Boston Bruins and Joe Namath of the NFL's New York Jets, as proprietors of the popular "Bachelors III" dating bar in downtown Boston.

After retirement as a player, Colclough served as the head coach at Boston State College in the 1978 and 1979 campaigns. Under his tutelage, the Warriors compiled a 10–8 record in the New England Football Conference (currently Commonwealth Coast Football). In his first season, they were NEFC co-champions with a 6–2 record (6–3 overall).

Colclough died on May 16, 2004, at Massachusetts General Hospital in Boston from complications of hepatitis C.

== AFL career statistics ==
Legend
	Led the league
**Bold**	Career high

=== Regular season ===
Year	Team	Games		Receiving				
Year	Team	GP	GS	Rec	Yds	Avg	Lng	TD
1960	BOS	14	14	**49**	666	13.6	61	9
1961	BOS	14	13	42	757	18.0	58	9
1962	BOS	14	14	40	**868**	**21.7**	**78**	**10**
1963	BOS	14	14	42	693	16.5	56	3
1964	BOS	14	6	32	657	20.5	59	5
1965	BOS	14	9	40	677	16.9	41	3
1966	BOS	14	1	16	284	17.8	32	0
1967	BOS	14	7	14	263	18.8	52	0
1968	BOS	14	4	8	136	17.0	44	0
Career		126	82	283	5,001	17.7	78	39

=== Playoffs ===
Year	Team	Games		Receiving				
Year	Team	GP	GS	Rec	Yds	Avg	Lng	TD
1963	BOS	2	2	4	35	8.8	10	0
Career		2	2	4	35	8.8	10	0

== Head coaching record ==
Year	Team	Overall	Conference	Standing	Bowl/playoffs
**Boston State Warriors** (New England Football Conference) (1978–1979)
1978	Boston State	6–3	6–2	T–1st	
1979	Boston State	4–5	4–5	T–5th	
Boston State:		10–8	10–7		
Total:		10–8			
National championship Conference title Conference division title or championship game berth

== See also ==
- List of American Football League players
