= Lonnie Farmer =

American football player (1940–2016)

No. 55
- Position: Linebacker

Personal information
- Born: March 28, 1940; Steubenville, Ohio, U.S.
- Died: February 24, 2016 (aged 75); Chattanooga, Tennessee, U.S.
- Listed height: 6 ft 0 in (1.83 m)
- Listed weight: 220 lb (100 kg)

Career information
- High school: Steubenville (OH)
- College: Northwestern, Chattanooga
- AFL draft: 1964: 20th round, 156th overall pick

Career history
- Boston Patriots (1964–1966)
- Stats at Pro Football Reference

Lonnie Farmer (March 28, 1940 – February 24, 2016) was an American football linebacker. He played for the Boston Patriots from 1964 to 1966.

He died on February 24, 2016, in Chattanooga, Tennessee, at age 75.
