= Don Oakes (American football) =

American football player (1938–2025)

No. 77, 71
- Positions: Offensive tackle, defensive tackle

Personal information
- Born: July 22, 1938; Roanoke, Virginia, U.S.
- Died: March 29, 2025 (aged 86); Roanoke, Virginia, U.S.
- Listed height: 6 ft 4 in (1.93 m)
- Listed weight: 255 lb (116 kg)

Career information
- High school: Andrew Lewis (Salem, Virginia)
- College: Virginia Tech
- NFL draft: 1961: 3rd round, 42nd overall pick
- AFL draft: 1961: 21st round, 162nd overall pick

Career history
- Philadelphia Eagles (1961–1962); Boston Patriots (1963-1968)

Awards and highlights
- AFL All-Star (1967)

Career NFL/AFL statistics
- Games played: 104
- Games started: 74
- Stats at Pro Football Reference

Donald Sherman Oakes (July 22, 1938 – March 29, 2025) was an American professional football player who was an offensive tackle in the National Football League (NFL) and American Football League (AFL). He played college football for the VPI Gobblers where his accomplishments led to his induction into the Virginia Tech Sports Hall of Fame. Professionally, he played two seasons for the NFL's Philadelphia Eagles and six seasons for the AFL's Boston Patriots. After retiring from professional football, Oakes became a high school coach in his hometown of Roanoke, Virginia. Oakes died on March 29, 2025, at the age of 86.

== See also ==
- List of American Football League players
