= Ron Hall (defensive back) =

American football player (born 1937)

No. 26, 23
- Positions: Safety, cornerback

Personal information
- Born: April 30, 1937 (age 89); Granite City, Illinois, U.S.
- Listed height: 6 ft 0 in (1.83 m)
- Listed weight: 190 lb (86 kg)

Career information
- High school: Granite City
- College: Missouri Valley
- NFL draft: 1959: 28th round, 331st overall pick

Career history
- Pittsburgh Steelers (1959); Washington Redskins (1961)*; Boston Patriots (1961–1967)
- * Offseason or practice squad member only

Awards and highlights
- AFL All-Star (1963); Boston Patriots All-1960s Team; New England Patriots 35th Anniversary Team

Career NFL/AFL statistics
- Interceptions: 30
- Fumble recoveries: 1
- Touchdowns: 1
- Stats at Pro Football Reference

Ron Hall (born April 30, 1937) is an American former professional football player who was a safety in the National Football League (NFL) and American Football League (AFL). He played college football at Missouri Valley College, where he was a 1971 inductee to the school's Athletic Hall of Fame. As a professional, he played for the Pittsburgh Steelers of the NFL in 1959 and for the Boston Patriots of the AFL from 1961 to 1967. He was an AFL All-Star in 1963 and a member of the Patriots' All-Decade 1960s Team. His 11 interceptions during the 1964 season (3 interceptions in a game against San Diego) set a single-season Patriots record (12-game season) which in 2023 has not been broken. In 1995 he was named to the New England Patriots' 35th Anniversary team. In 2012 he was inducted into the NAIA Athletic Hall of Fame and in 2017 Hall was inducted into the Missouri Sports Hall of Fame.

== Early life ==
Hall was born on April 30, 1937, in Granite City, Illinois, at the time a steel manufacturing town near the Mississippi River. He attended Granite City High School, where he played fullback on the school's varsity football team for three years. During the 1953 football season, he received player of the week recognition for Illinois. He was also named All-State in high school.

== College career ==
Hall received a scholarship to, and attended, Missouri Valley College, the first person in his family to go to college. He graduated with a Bachelor of Science degree in education in 1959. He played halfback and defensive back on the Vikings varsity football team from 1955 to 1958, under coach Volney Ashford. In 1955, the Vikings won the Missouri Intercollegiate Athletic Association Championship. They played in the 1955 Mineral Water Bowl, in Excelsior Springs, Missouri, on Thanksgiving Day; defeating Hastings College (Nebraska), 31–7. They played Juniata College in the Tangerine Bowl (now Citrus Bowl) on January 2, 1956, ending in a 6–6 tie (breaking Juniata's 23 game winning streak).

As a senior, Hall and the Vikings returned to the Tangerine Bowl in December 1958, losing to East Texas State (now East Texas A&M University), 26–7. The Vikings had been undefeated and untied that season, going into the Tangerine Bowl, and were 1958 champions of the Missouri College Athletic Union (MCAU), with an 11 game winning streak and averaging nearly 347 rushing yards per game.

Hall was named MCAU All-Conference as a junior and senior, and was selected as a Little College All-American as a senior. He participated in the first All-American Bowl, held in Tucson, Arizona, between small college and major college all stars.

Hall was also a sprinter on Missouri Valley's track and field team for three years, running the 100- and 220-yard dashes, and relays. He also participated in the broad jump.

== Professional career ==
The Pittsburgh Steelers selected Hall in the 28th round of the 1959 National Football League draft, 331st overall; after scouting him in the All-American Bowl. He was a backup defensive back for the Steelers in 1959, under defensive backs coach Harry Gilmer. He started one game and had one interception. Hall also returned five punts for 23 yards and one kickoff for 22 yards. In 1960, Hall was drafted into the United States Army and did not play professional football, serving at Fort Riley, Kansas.

After leaving the military, in 1961 Hall was signed by the Boston Patriots of the one-year old American Football League (AFL). The Patriots general manager had contacted Hall about playing for the team. Hall played in the Patriots' defensive backfield from 1961 to 1967, and at times had responsibility as defensive signal caller. In Boston, he was guided in how to play defensive back by head coach Mike Holovak and assistant coaches Chuck Weber, Fred Bruney and Marion Campbell. He started seven games at strong safety in 1961, with two interceptions. In 1962, he started four games in the defensive backfield with three interceptions. He returned one of those interceptions 47 yards for a touchdown against the Denver Broncos on September 21.

In 1963, he became a full-time starter at left cornerback, and had three interceptions on the season. He was selected to play in the AFL All-Star Game in 1963, and United Press International (UPI) named him second-team All-AFL in 1963. The Patriots reached the AFL Championship Game, but lost to the San Diego Chargers, 51–10. 1964 was his best season as a professional. Hall started all 14 games at safety and had 11 interceptions (second in the AFL). The Associated Press (AP), UPI and the Newspaper Enterprise Association (NEA) named him first-team All-AFL that year. The greatest game of his career came on September 20, 1964 against the reigning AFL champion San Diego Chargers, when Hall intercepted three passes, one thrown by John Hadl and two by Tobin Rote.

In 1965, Hall started 12 games at safety, and had three interceptions. In 1966, he started all 14 Patriots' games, playing both safety and cornerback. He had six interceptions, including a September 18 interception against the Denver Broncos that he returned 87 yards (the longest interception return in the AFL that season).

During the 1967 season, Hall eventually lost his starting position (starting only six games on the season). This was his final season. The Patriots left him exposed in the 1968 expansion draft, and he was selected by the Cincinnati Bengals. The Bengals waived him in July 1968.

== Legacy and honors ==
In 1971, he was inducted into the Missouri Valley College Athletic Hall of Fame. He was named to the National Association of Intercollegiate Athletics (NAIA) 2011–2012 Hall of Fame class. In 2017, he was inducted into the Missouri Sports Hall of Fame.

He was selected to the Patriots 1960s All Decade Team at safety, and in 1995 was named to the Patriots 35th Anniversary team at safety.

His 11 interceptions in 1964 remains a Patriots record (through the 2024 season). He is tied for fourth all time in interceptions (29) for the Patriots (through the 2024 season), and his 29 interceptions set the team record until 1986 when broken by Raymond Clayborn. His three interceptions in one game is tied for the Patriots’ record.

== Personal life ==
Hall taught physical education at public schools in the Kansas City and Liberty, Missouri, School Districts for over 30 years, coaching football for 16 years and golf for 15 years. Hall's 1971 and 1972 football teams won the Suburban Conference Championship and Hall was named the Suburban 8 Conference Coach of the Year in 1971. Hall's wife Jayne (Wentworth) Hall is from Melrose, Massachusetts, and they met while she was a secretary for the Patriots. They have 3 children and have been married for over 60 years.

During his professional playing career, Hall lived in Kansas City, Missouri in the off season, and was a junior high school substitute teacher in Raytown, Missouri. He also pursued a master's degree at Central Missouri State College (also then called Warrensburg State, and now known as the University of Central Missouri).

== See also ==
- List of American Football League players
