= Houston Antwine =

American football player (1939–2011)

- Antwine in 1972

No. 65, 75
- Position: Defensive tackle

Personal information
- Born: April 11, 1939; Louise, Mississippi, U.S.
- Died: December 26, 2011 (aged 72); Memphis, Tennessee, U.S.
- Listed height: 6 ft 0 in (1.83 m)
- Listed weight: 270 lb (122 kg)

Career information
- High school: Manassas (Memphis, Tennessee)
- College: Southern Illinois
- NFL draft: 1961: 3rd round, 38th overall pick
- AFL draft: 1961: 8th round, 63rd overall pick

Career history

Playing
- Boston / New England Patriots (1961–1971); Philadelphia Eagles (1972)

Coaching
- New England Colonials (1973) Assistant coach

Awards and highlights
- First-team All-AFL (1963); 5× Second-team All-AFL (1964, 1966–1969); 6× AFL All-Star (1963–1968); All-Time All-AFL Team; Boston Patriots All-1960s Team; New England Patriots 35th Anniversary Team; New England Patriots 50th Anniversary Team; New England Patriots Hall of Fame; Second-team Little All-American (1960)

Career AFL + NFL statistics
- Fumble recoveries: 2
- Interceptions: 1
- Sacks: 38
- Stats at Pro Football Reference

Houston J. "Twine" Antwine (April 11, 1939 – December 26, 2011) was an American football defensive tackle who played in the American Football League (AFL) and National Football League (NFL) for 12 seasons.

== Early life ==
Antwine was born on April 11, 1939, in Louise, Mississippi. He attended Manassas High School in Memphis, Tennessee, where he was named an All-Memphis guard in 1956 and 1957.

== College football ==
He played college football as a two-way lineman and wrestled for the Southern Illinois University Salukis. He was named a Little All-American for football, and finished as second in the NAIA heavyweight division in wrestling. In 1958, he was selected an All-American by the Williamson National Football Rating System as a defensive tackle. Antwine was selected by his football teammates as team MVP in 1960. That season, the Salukis won the Interstate Intercollegiate Athletic Conference (then the Illinois Intercollegiate Athletic Conference). He earned All-Conference honors two consecutive years.

He played in the 1961 Chicago All-Star Game against the Philadelphia Eagles. Antwine was the only player to be named to both the Illinois Intercollegiate Athletic Conference offensive and defensive teams. He was inducted into the Southern Illinois University Athletic Hall of Fame in 1979.

== Professional career ==
He was selected by the AFL's Houston Oilers in the 1961 AFL draft, but he was traded to the Boston Patriots for a fourth-round 1962 AFL draft pick. The Detroit Lions also drafted him in the third round of the 1961 NFL draft. The vaunted Lions defense already had Pro Bowlers Roger Brown and Alex Karras in place at this position, which prompted Antwine to choose the Patriots. He played all 28 games (two starts) in his first two seasons.

He earned his first of six straight All-Star selections in 1963, a season in which Antwine was also named first team All-AFL by the AFL, the Associated Press (AP), United Press International (UPI), and the Newspaper Enterprise Association (NEA). The Patriots tied for the best record in the East Division at 7–6–1. The Patriots won the Divisional Playoff game versus Buffalo before losing to the San Diego Chargers in the AFL Championship Game. It was the only playoff experience for Antwine.

Nicknamed "Twine" from his wrestling days, Antwine was cited by Pro Football Hall of Famer Billy Shaw as one of the American Football League's best pass rushers, athletic and very quick on his feet, usually drawing double-team blocking on a line that also featured perennial All-Stars Bob Dee, Larry Eisenhauer and Jim Lee Hunt. The Pro Football Hall of Fame states Antwine became "one of the most dominant defensive players in league history especially noted as devastating against the run." Teammate Gino Cappelletti described Antwine with quickness akin to a cat, who could rush with his speed and technique. He returned his only interception as a player (for two yards) in a 28–20 win over the Denver Broncos on December 12, 1965.

Antwine was the AFL Defensive Player of the Week as he sacked Dan Darragh three times in the Patriots' 16–7 win over the Buffalo Bills at War Memorial Stadium on September 8, 1968. He had a career high in sacks that year with 7.5. He posted a career high ten tackles in the Patriots' 33–14 win over the Cincinnati Bengals at Fenway Park on December 1, 1968. He was traded in 1972 to the Philadelphia Eagles for Bill Hobbs and started nine games in his final season.

Statistics for sacks were not officially counted in his day, but Antwine is recognized as having 38 sacks in his 142 games with the Patriots (36) and Eagles (2), though other sources (including the Patriots team sources) report him having 39 sacks just with the Patriots. He led the team in three straight seasons (1967–1969).

Antwine was one of over twenty African American players who boycotted the 1965 AFL All-Star game in New Orleans because of unequal racial treatment throughout the city leading up to the game, later joined by some white players. As a result, the game was moved to Houston. New Orleans later had to demonstrate to the NFL changes were made in the city, so it could obtain an NFL franchise.

== Honors ==
He was named to the American Football League All-Time Team in 1970 as a first-team defensive tackle alongside Tom Sestak (with future Hall of Famer Buck Buchanan named a second-team tackle). In addition to being a six-time AFL All-Star, he was named All-AFL six times, including first team selections by The Sporting News (1963, 1966, 1968–69), AP (1963), UPI (1963, 1966), NEA (1963, 1966, 1968); and second team selections by the AP (1966-1969), UPI (1964, 1967-1968), and The Sporting News (1967).

After years as a finalist, Antwine was inducted into the Patriots Hall of Fame in 2015. He was also a member of the Patriots' 50th anniversary all time team.

== Personal life ==
Antwine died of heart failure in Memphis, Tennessee on December 26, 2011, less than a day before his wife Evelyn died of lung cancer.

== See also ==
- List of American Football League players
