= Babe Parilli =

American gridiron football player (1930–2017)

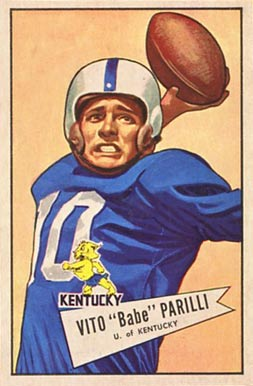
- 1952 Bowman football card

No. 15, 18, 26, 10
- Position: Quarterback

Personal information
- Born: May 7, 1930; Rochester, Pennsylvania, U.S.
- Died: July 15, 2017 (aged 87); Parker, Colorado, U.S.
- Listed height: 6 ft 1 in (1.85 m)
- Listed weight: 196 lb (89 kg)

Career information
- High school: Rochester
- College: Kentucky
- NFL draft: 1952: 1st round, 4th overall pick

Career history

Playing
- Green Bay Packers (1952–1953); Cleveland Browns (1956); Green Bay Packers (1957–1958); Ottawa Rough Riders (1959); Oakland Raiders (1960); Boston Patriots (1961–1967); New York Jets (1968–1969)

Coaching
- Pittsburgh Steelers (1973) Quarterbacks; New York Stars (1974) Head coach; Denver Broncos (1977–1979) Quarterbacks; New England Patriots (1981) Quarterbacks; Denver Gold (1984) Offensive coordinator; New England Steamrollers (1988) Head coach; Denver Dynamite (1989–1991) Head coach; Charlotte Rage (1992) Head coach; Las Vegas Sting (1994–1995) Head coach; Anaheim Piranhas (1996); Florida Bobcats (1997) Head coach

Awards and highlights
- Super Bowl champion (III); AFL champion (1968); AFL Comeback Player of the Year (1966); Boston Patriots All-1960s Team; New England Patriots Hall of Fame; First-team All-AFL (1964); 3× AFL All-Star (1963, 1964, 1966); AFL completion percentage leader (1961); AFL passing yards leader (1964); AFL passing touchdowns leader (1964); 1966 AFL All-Star Game MVP; 2× Consensus All-American (1950, 1951); SEC Player of the Year (1950); 2× First-team All-SEC (1950, 1951); Second-team All-SEC (1949); Inducted into KY Pro Football HOF (2004)

Career NFL statistics
- Passing attempts: 3,330
- Passing completions: 1,552
- Completion percentage: 46.6%
- TD–INT: 178–220
- Passing yards: 22,681
- Passer rating: 59.6
- Stats at Pro Football Reference
- College Football Hall of Fame

Vito "Babe" Parilli (May 7, 1930 – July 15, 2017) was an American football quarterback and coach who played professionally for 18 seasons. Parilli played five seasons in the National Football League (NFL), 10 in the American Football League (AFL), and three in the Canadian Football League (CFL). He played college football for the Kentucky Wildcats, twice receiving consensus All-American honors and winning two consecutive bowl games.

Parilli achieved his greatest professional success in the AFL as the starting quarterback of the Boston Patriots from 1961 to 1967. He earned three All-Star Game selections, while leading the Patriots to their only AFL postseason and championship game appearance in 1963. Present for the entirety of the AFL's existence, Parilli played his final seasons for the New York Jets and was part of the team that won a Super Bowl title in Super Bowl III. After retiring as a player, he served as a coach in the NFL, World Football League (WFL), and Arena Football League (AFL) from 1973 to 1997. He was inducted to the College Football Hall of Fame in 1982.

== Early life ==
Parilli was born and raised in Rochester, Pennsylvania, an industrial town northwest of Pittsburgh, Parilli graduated from Rochester High School in 1948.

== College career ==
Parilli played college football at the University of Kentucky in Lexington, and was a quarterback for the Wildcats under head coach Paul "Bear" Bryant. He was a consensus All-American in 1950 and 1951 and was fourth in the Heisman Trophy voting in 1950 and third in 1951. He led the Wildcats to victories in consecutive New Year's Day bowl games in the 1951 Sugar Bowl and 1952 Cotton Bowl.

=== Statistics ===
Season	Passing					
Season	Comp	Att	Yards	Comp%	TD	INT
1949	81	150	1081	54.0	8	13
1950	114	203	1627	56.2	23	12
1951	136	239	1643	56.9	19	12
Career total	331	592	4351	55.9	50	37

== Football career ==
=== Early years ===
Parilli was the fourth overall selection of the 1952 NFL draft, taken by the Green Bay Packers. He played two seasons with the Packers and was then drafted into the United States Air Force and to the Cleveland Browns. Fulfilling his ROTC commitment, he became a lieutenant in the Air Force and, like a lot of other pros, played service football. When his service was over he played a season with the Cleveland Browns in 1956, two more with the Packers, and another with Ottawa in 1959.

=== AFL ===
At age 30, Parilli was picked up by the Oakland Raiders of the fledgling American Football League on August 17, 1960, and threw for just over 1,000 yards that season.

On April 4, 1961, he was part of a five-player trade that sent him to the Boston Patriots, and he went on to become one of the AFL's most productive and colorful players. Playing for the Patriots from 1961 through 1967, Parilli finished his career with over 25,000 total yards and 200 touchdowns, ending among the top five quarterbacks in 23 categories such as passing yards, passing touchdowns and rushing yards. Parilli was selected for three All-Star Games. In 1964, throwing primarily to Gino Cappelletti, Parilli amassed nearly 3,500 yards passing with 31 touchdowns; the latter was a Patriots record until Tom Brady broke it in 2007. During that season's contest against the Oakland Raiders on October 16, he threw for 422 yards and four touchdown passes in a 43–43 tie. Parilli is a member of the Patriots All-1960s (AFL) Team.

Parilli completed his career with the New York Jets, where he earned a ring as Joe Namath's backup in Super Bowl III, when the Jets stunned the Baltimore Colts by a 16–7 score. Coincidentally, this gave the Jets two quarterbacks from Pennsylvania's Beaver County, with Parilli being from Rochester and Namath being from nearby Beaver Falls. In addition, both played for "Bear" Bryant in college, as Namath played at Alabama. In 1967, it was discovered by Life magazine that Parilli and several other professional athletes were regular patrons of Patriarca crime family mobster Arthur Ventola's major fencing operation called Arthur's Farm in Revere, Massachusetts. Despite the organized crime connection, journalist Howie Carr stated that there was never any inside information passed between Parilli and Ventola. Arthur was the uncle of mob associate Richard Castucci.

Besides his considerable skills as a quarterback, he was one of the best holders in the history of football and was nicknamed "gold-finger" as a result of kicker Jim Turner's then-record 145 points kicked in 1968 (plus another 19 points in the play-offs and in Super Bowl III). He is one of only 20 players who were in the American Football League for its entire ten-year existence, and is a member of the University of Kentucky Athletic Hall of Fame. In 1982, Parilli was named to the College Football Hall of Fame.

Because of their Italian surnames, the Patriots' wide receiver-quarterback duo of Cappelletti and Parilli was nicknamed "Grand Opera."

Parilli retired as a player at the age of 40 in August 1970.

== Career statistics ==
Legend
	Won the Super Bowl
	Led the league
**Bold**	Career high
Underline	Incomplete data

=== Regular season ===
Year	Team	Games			Passing									Rushing					Sacked		Fum
Year	Team	GP	GS	Record	Cmp	Att	Pct	Yds	Y/A	Lng	TD	Int	Rtg	Att	Yds	Y/A	Lng	TD	Sck	SckY	Fum
1952	GB	12	4	2–2	77	177	43.5	1,416	8.0	**90**	13	17	56.6	32	106	3.3	19	1	—	127	4
1953	GB	12	5	0–5	74	166	44.6	830	5.0	45	4	19	28.5	42	171	4.1	19	4	—	161	**8**
1956	CLE	5	3	1–2	24	49	49.0	409	**8.3**	68	3	7	58.5	18	65	3.6	19	0	—	63	4
1957	GB	12	1	0–1	39	102	38.2	669	6.6	75	4	12	34.8	24	83	3.5	20	2	—	125	3
1958	GB	12	4	1–3	68	157	43.3	1,068	6.8	80	10	13	53.3	8	15	1.9	5	0	—	89	4
1960	OAK	**14**	1	1–0	87	187	46.5	1,003	5.4	49	5	11	47.6	21	131	**6.2**	16	1	11	106	3
1961	BOS	**14**	8	6–2	104	198	52.5	1,314	6.6	53	13	9	76.5	38	183	4.8	24	4	15	118	2
1962	BOS	10	10	6–3–1	140	253	55.3	1,988	7.9	67	18	8	91.5	28	169	6.0	**33**	2	10	68	6
1963	BOS	**14**	13	7–5–1	153	337	45.4	2,345	7.0	77	13	24	52.1	36	126	3.5	19	**5**	26	200	7
1964	BOS	**14**	**14**	**10–3–1**	**228**	**473**	48.2	**3,465**	7.3	80	**31**	**27**	70.8	34	168	4.9	32	2	27	279	7
1965	BOS	**14**	13	4–8–1	173	426	40.6	2,597	6.1	73	18	26	50.0	**50**	**200**	4.0	17	0	**35**	**334**	**8**
1966	BOS	**14**	**14**	8–4–2	181	382	47.4	2,721	7.1	63	20	20	66.9	28	42	1.5	17	1	22	189	**8**
1967	BOS	**14**	11	3–7–1	161	344	46.8	2,317	6.7	79	19	24	58.5	14	61	4.4	18	0	29	250	4
1968	NYJ	**14**	0	—	29	55	52.7	401	7.3	47	5	2	**91.6**	7	−2	−0.3	10	1	3	23	3
1969	NYJ	**14**	0	—	14	24	**58.3**	138	5.8	29	2	1	85.1	3	4	1.3	2	0	0	0	0
Career		189	101	49–45–7	1,552	3,330	46.6	22,681	6.8	90	178	220	59.6	383	1,522	4.0	33	23	178	2,132	71

=== Postseason ===
Year	Team	Games			Passing									Rushing					Sacked		Fum
Year	Team	GP	GS	Record	Cmp	Att	Pct	Yds	Y/A	Lng	TD	Int	Rtg	Att	Yds	Y/A	Lng	TD	Sck	SckY	Fum
1963	BOS	**2**	**2**	**1–1**	**28**	**64**	**43.8**	**489**	**7.6**	**59**	**2**	**2**	**67.8**	**2**	**10**	**5.0**	**10**	**0**	**7**	**50**	**1**
1968	NYJ	**2**	0	—	0	1	0.0	0	0.0	0	0	0	39.6	0	0	—	0	**0**	0	0	0
Career		4	2	1–1	28	65	43.1	489	7.5	59	2	2	66.8	2	10	5.0	10	0	7	50	1

== Coaching career ==
In 1974, Parilli became the head coach of the New York Stars of the World Football League; after going bankrupt, the franchise moved to Charlotte mid-season. The next year, he was tabbed as coach of the WFL's Chicago Winds, and briefly seemed to have a chance to coach his old teammate, Joe Namath. But Namath turned Chicago down, and Parilli was replaced in late July after only two pre-season games. (The Winds would play only five regular-season contests before folding, and the rest of the WFL would collapse a few months later.) Parilli would later coach in the Arena Football League, helming the New England Steamrollers, Denver Dynamite, Charlotte Rage, Las Vegas Sting, Anaheim Piranhas and Florida Bobcats.

== Death ==
Parilli died on July 15, 2017, in Parker, Colorado of multiple myeloma at the age of 87.

== Honors ==
Parilli was elected to the College Football Hall of Fame in 1982. On November 15, 2014, he was inducted into the National Italian American Sports Hall of Fame.

== See also ==
- List of NCAA major college football yearly passing leaders
- Other American Football League players
