= Jim Lee Hunt =

American football player (1938–1975)

No. 79
- Positions: Defensive tackle, defensive end

Personal information
- Born: October 5, 1938; Atlanta, Texas, U.S.
- Died: November 22, 1975 (aged 37); Boston, Massachusetts, U.S.
- Listed height: 5 ft 11 in (1.80 m)
- Listed weight: 255 lb (116 kg)

Career information
- High school: Booker T. Washington
- College: Prairie View A&M
- NFL draft: 1960: 16th round, 181st overall pick

Career history
- Boston Patriots (1960–1970)

Awards and highlights
- 4× AFL All-Star (1961, 1966, 1967, 1969); 4× Second-team All-AFL (1961, 1966–1968); Boston Patriots All-1960s Team; New England Patriots 35th Anniversary Team; New England Patriots Hall of Fame; New England Patriots No. 79 retired

Career NFL/AFL statistics
- Fumble recoveries: 15
- Interceptions: 1
- Sacks: 30
- Stats at Pro Football Reference

Jim Lee "Earthquake" Hunt (October 5, 1938 – November 22, 1975) was an American professional football player who was a defensive tackle for the American Football League's (AFL) Boston Patriots from 1960 through 1969, and for the National Football League's (NFL) Boston Patriots in 1970. He was a four-time AFL All-Star, and was one of only 20 men to play the entire ten years of the AFL's independent existence (1960 to 1969). Hunt holds the AFL's all-time record for career fumble recoveries (14). The Patriots retired his No. 79 jersey upon Hunt's retirement in 1971, and inducted Hunt into the team's Hall of Fame in 1993. Hunt was also selected to the Boston Patriots 1960s All-Decade Team and the New England Patriots 35th anniversary all-time team.

Hunt played college football for the Prairie View A&M Panthers, where he was an All-American tackle.

== Early life ==
Hunt was born on October 5, 1938, in Atlanta, Texas. He was the oldest of 10 children; raised on a small farm in Atlanta, living in a three-room shack. Hunt said his mother took in laundry and raised the family on $26 a week. After becoming a professional football player, Hunt helped four of his sisters go to college; and bought his mother a new home, and relieved her financial worries.

== College career ==
Hunt received a scholarship to attend Prairie View A&M College (now Prairie View A&M University), and played football for the Prairie View A&M Panthers in the Southwestern Athletic Conference (SWAC), at tackle. The 1958 Prairie View A&M team won the W. A. Scott Memorial Trophy as the national championship team among historically black colleges and universities (HBCU). The Panthers defeated Florida A&M, 26–8, in the 1958 Orange Blossom Classic to win that title. Hunt led the offensive and defensive lines in that victory.

Hunt was an All-American in 1959, as a 247 lb (112 kg) senior. In 1959, the Pittsburgh Courier named Hunt a first-team All-American at tackle in its 28th annual All-American team selections among HBCU schools; and the Atlanta Daily World named Hunt a third-team All-American at tackle in its inaugural All-American selections.

The 5 ft 11 in (1.8 m) 215 lb (97.5 kg) Hunt ran the 220–yard dash in college, and had run that distance in 21.1 seconds. He was also a hurdler in college. He is also reported to have run the 100–yard dash in 9.8 seconds.

== Professional career ==
Hunt was drafted out of Prairie View A&M University in the 16th round of the 1960 NFL draft by the Chicago Cardinals. He signed with the Cardinals in early March 1960. The Cardinals released Hunt in September 1960, before the start of the NFL season. After that, the Cardinals paid Hunt $100 per week to play on the practice team that would scrimmage against the Cardinals' players.

In early November 1960, Hunt signed to play for the Boston Patriots of the new American Football League (AFL), after being recommended to the injury-riddled Patriots by Cardinals' scouts. Patriots' head coach Lou Saban started Hunt at defensive tackle during Hunt’s first week with the team. In Hunt's third game with the Patriots that November, he was the key defensive player in holding the Dallas Texans to less than 50 rushing yards; and hit quarterback Cotton Davidson as he was dropping back to pass causing a fumble that Hunt himself recovered, after which the Patriots scored a touchdown. It has been reported that Hunt played in, or was available to play in, six games for the Patriots that season, starting two.

Hunt started all 14 games for the Patriots in 1961, playing right defensive tackle, with three quarterback sacks and two fumble recoveries. The Patriots had a 9–4–1 record. He was selected to play in the AFL All-Star Game that season. The AFL named him second-team All-AFL.

In an early September 1962 preseason games against the Buffalo Bills, Hunt suffered torn ligaments in his right knee. He started only one game that season, and it would take another three years before he became a starter again. Hunt did not start any games in 1963, playing behind starting left defensive tackle Jess Richardson and right defensive tackle Houston Antwine. In an early November 1963 game, while playing at defensive end, Hunt intercepted a pass against the Houston Oilers and returned it 78 or 79 yards for a touchdown. It has been reported that Hunt received his nickname "Earthquake" because of his touchdown run on this play.

He reportedly started three games in 1964, with 2.5 sacks and one fumble recovery. That season Hunt was still a reserve, but improved considerably over prior years, and was called the fastest lineman on the 1964 Patriots' team for 40 yards. Richardson retired after the 1964 season, and Hunt started eight games at left defensive tackle in 1965. He had three sacks and one fumble recovery. A few years later, when Jess Richardson was an assistant coach with the Patriots, Hunt said that "'The coach took my job . . . I had to wait for him to finish up before I could get back'".

In 1966, Hunt started 10 games at left defensive tackle. He had a team-leading nine sacks and two fumble recoveries. He was selected to play in the AFL All-Star Game for a second time. The Newspaper Enterprise Association (NEA) named Hunt second-team All-AFL. Hunt recovered a fumble for a touchdown in an early November 1966 game against the Denver Broncos.

Hunt started all 14 games in 1967 for the first time since 1962. He had five sacks, two fumble recoveries, and recorded a safety against Jack Kemp and the Buffalo Bills. In the season's first game he stole the ball from Denver Broncos' quarterback Steve Tensi, but was tackled by teammate Ed Philpott, when Hunt began running with the ball in the wrong direction. He was selected to play in the AFL All-Star Game for the third time. He was named second-team All-AFL by the NEA and The Sporting News. In 1967, AFL scouts named Hunt the “best pass rushing tackle in the AFL”.

In 1968, Hunt again started all 14 games for the Patriots. Hunt had a career high, and league leading, four fumble recoveries in 1968. He also had 2.5 sacks. Hunt was named second-team All-AFL by the New York Daily News. He returned a fumble by Don Trull 51 yards in the Patriots 45–17 loss to the Houston Oilers at the Houston Astrodome on December 15, 1968. Hunt became an all-star selection again in 1969, starting in 14 games, with one fumble recovery and 2.5 sacks. In 1969, Hunt set an AFL record with his 14th career fumble recovery, and he had his 15th the following season as a member of the NFL.

The AFL and NFL fully merged before the 1970 season into one 26-team league (the NFL). Hunt was one of only 20 players to play in the AFL for all ten seasons of the AFL's distinct existence (1960 to 1969); and along with Gino Cappelleti played all ten AFL seasons with the Patriots. In his final season, Hunt started 13 games at left defensive tackle, with 2.5 sacks and one fumble recovery. Hunt was hobbled toward the end of the season with a knee injury.

Hunt retired before the start of the 1971 season, to the shock of his teammates. Hunt told head coach John Mazur he was retiring after Hunt was not used at all in the Patriots' first 1971 preseason game that August. Hunt said at the time "'I've always said that when I saw the handwriting on the wall I'd leave with my pride'". Cappelleti retired shortly thereafter; making them the last two original Boston Patriots.

Hunt played 146 games with the Patriots, starting 93 games and totaling 30 sacks and 15 fumble recoveries. He was used as a defensive end occasionally.

== Coaching career ==
Hunt was a defensive line coach for the Boston University Terriers' football team for three years.

== Legacy and honors ==
In 1993, Hunt was inducted into the New England Patriots' Hall of Fame. Hunt's No. 79 jersey was retired by the Patriots in 1971 after Hunt retired. An award for the best Patriots' lineman was named in his honor. He is a member of the AFL Boston Patriots 1960s All-Decade Team. Hunt was also selected to the Patriots' 35th anniversary all-time Patriots' team. Hunt holds the AFL Record for the most career fumble recoveries (14). In 1995, he was named to the Southwestern Athletic Conference's 75th anniversary football team. In 1989, he was inducted into the Prairie View Hall of Fame.

During Hunt's final season at tackle, New York Jets' guard Dave Herman said "'I've been up against Alex Karras, Ike Lassiter, Bubba Smith, Joe Greene, Merlin Olsen last week, and Gary Larsen next week. But Jim Hunt's probably the toughest tackle of them all'". Hunt was described as the Patriots' fastest defensive lineman; and has been considered probably the AFL's fastest rushing defensive tackle.

After retiring, and shortly before his death, Hunt observed that in his experience many players had lost the joy of playing football, and that the principal objective had become playing for money. "'Some guys in my day were probably playing strictly for money, too. Not me. I played because I enjoyed it'". He was described as having a serene disposition, and speaking in a whispering voice. Hunt's trademark move was to help an opposing player up off the ground after tackling that opponent.

Hunt was nicknamed "Earthquake" during his professional career. It has been reported that Hunt earned that nickname because of his long touchdown run on an interception return in 1963; and specifically that sportscaster Bob Gallagher gave Hunt the nickname in 1963 because of that touchdown run. It has also been stated that Hunt was nicknamed "Earthquake" because it was said that the ground rumbled when he rushed the passer.

During his career, Hunt recovered fumbles by Cotton Davidson, Al Dorow, Tom Flores, Mickey Slaughter, Ode Burrell, Darrell Lester, Daryle Lamonica, Steve Tensi, Bobby Burnett, Marlin Briscoe, Bob Cappadona, Robert Holmes, Don Trull and Larry Csonka. He had sacks of 19 different quarterbacks, including: Frank Tripucka, George Herring, Tom Flores, John Hadl, Jacky Lee, Len Dawson, John McCormick, Jack Kemp, Joe Namath, Don Trull, Max Chobian, Daryle Lamonica, Steve Tensi, Rick Norton, Pete Beathard, Jim LeClair, Bob Griese, Earl Morrall, and James Harris.

== Personal life and death ==
Hunt was married with three children. After joining the Patriots, he donated much of his non-playing time to the Boys Clubs of Boston; and frequently visited the Belchertown State School. He also volunteered at the Little People's School for the Deaf in Newton, Massachusetts. From 1972 to 1975 he was an assistant commissioner of the Boston Parks and Recreation Department. After his death, the Jim Lee Hunt Memorial Foundation was established to help underprivileged children.

Hunt died of a heart attack on November 22, 1975, at the age of 38. He was in a hotel room in Philadelphia at the time of his death, just four hours before Boston University was to play against Villanova University. His final rites were held in Marsh Chapel at Boston University, and he was buried in Atlanta, Texas.

== See also ==
- Other American Football League players
