= Chuck Shonta =

American football player (born 1937)

No. 34
- Position: Defensive back

Personal information
- Born: August 29, 1937 (age 89); Detroit, Michigan, U.S.

Career information
- College: Eastern Michigan

Career history
- Boston Patriots (1960–1967)

Awards and highlights
- AFL All-Star (1966); Boston Patriots All-1960s Team
- Stats at Pro Football Reference

Charles Shonta (born August 29, 1937) is an American former professional football player who was a defensive back for the Boston Patriots of the American Football League (AFL). He played college football for the Eastern Michigan Eagles. In 1960, he joined the Patriots of the upstart AFL. He played there for eight seasons and was a one-time AFL All-Star selection, and is a member of the Patriots All-1960s (AFL) Team.

== See also ==
- Other American Football League players
