= Mike Holovak =

American football player, coach, and executive (1919–2008)

- Holovak in 1963

No. 45, 15
- Positions: Fullback, linebacker

Personal information
- Born: September 19, 1919; Lansford, Pennsylvania, U.S.
- Died: January 27, 2008 (aged 88); Ruskin, Florida, U.S.
- Listed height: 6 ft 1 in (1.85 m)
- Listed weight: 213 lb (97 kg)

Career information
- High school: Seton Hall Preparatory School (West Orange, New Jersey)
- College: Boston College
- NFL draft: 1943: 1st round, 5th overall pick

Career history

Playing
- Los Angeles Rams (1946); Chicago Bears (1947–1948)

Coaching
- Melville PT Raiders (1945) Head coach; Boston College (1949–1950) Freshman coach; Boston College (1951–1959) Head coach; Boston Patriots (1960–1961) Running backs coach; Boston Patriots (1961–1968) Head coach; San Francisco 49ers (1969) Quarterbacks coach & running backs coach; Oakland Raiders (1971) Wide receivers coach; New York Jets (1973) Running backs coach; New York Jets (1976) Interim head coach

Operations
- Boston Patriots (1964–1968) General manager; New York Jets (1974–1976) Director of player personnel; New England Patriots (1977–1978) Personnel assistant; New England Patriots (1979–1980) Director of college scouting; Houston Oilers (1981–1988) Assistant general manager; Houston Oilers (1989–1993) General manager

Awards and highlights
- Titans/Oilers Ring of Honor; AP AFL Coach of the Year (1964); UPI AFL Coach of the Year (1966); Boston Patriots All-1960s Team (Coach); Consensus All-American (1942); First-team All-Eastern (1942); Boston College Eagles No. 12 retired

Career NFL statistics
- Rushing yards: 720
- Rushing average: 5.3
- Receptions: 13
- Receiving yards: 155
- Total touchdowns: 6
- Stats at Pro Football Reference

Head coaching record
- Regular season: NCAA: 49–29–3 (.623); NFL: 52–47–9 (.523)
- Postseason: NFL: 1–1 (.500)
- Career: NCAA: 49–29–3 (.623); NFL: 53–48–9 (.523)
- Military career
- Allegiance: United States
- Branch: United States Navy
- Service years: 1943–1946
- Rank: Lieutenant Commander
- Unit: PT boats
- Conflicts: World War II: Pacific theater
- Coaching profile at Pro Football Reference
- Executive profile at Pro Football Reference
- College Football Hall of Fame

Michael Joseph Holovak (September 19, 1919 – January 27, 2008) was an American professional football player, coach, and executive. He played college football at Boston College, where he was an All-American at fullback in 1942.

Holovak was the fifth overall selection of the 1943 NFL draft by the Cleveland Rams. After serving in the U.S. Navy during World War II, he played in the National Football League (NFL) with the Rams in 1946, who had moved to Los Angeles, then with the Chicago Bears in 1947 and 1948. Holovak was the freshman coach at his alma mater Boston College, then was head coach of the varsity from 1951 through 1959, compiling a 49–29–3 record.

In 1960, he joined the Boston Patriots of the new American Football League (AFL) as an assistant under head coach Lou Saban, coaching the offensive backfield. Holovak took over as head coach for the final nine games in 1961 after Saban was fired after a 2–3 start, and remained as head coach through 1968. In 1976, he served one game as head coach for the New York Jets. He was also the general manager of the Houston Oilers from 1989 to 1993. Holovak was inducted into the College Football Hall of Fame as a player in 1985.

== Early life ==
Holovak was one of six children and the youngest of five sons born in Lansford, Pennsylvania. Two of his brothers, Charlie and Pete, played football at Navy and Fordham, respectively. His father, a coal miner, died from a lung ailment in 1938. He played fullback at Lansford High School, but was not offered a scholarship. He worked for a year, then enrolled at Seton Hall Preparatory School with high school teammate Joe Repko. After a year at Seton Hall, Holovak was offered a scholarship to play at Fordham, where his brother was a star player. However, when Fordham assistant Frank Leahy got the head coaching job at Boston College, Holovak chose to play for BC instead.

== College career ==
Holovak played for the Boston College freshman team in 1939. He became the varsity starter at fullback his sophomore year after Frank Davis quit football before the start of the season. During the regular season, Holovak scored 11 touchdowns and averaged 4.1 yards on 112 carries. He also scored a goal line touchdown in BC's 19–13 over Tennessee in the 1941 Sugar Bowl.

In 1941, Holovak was moved to right halfback and rushed for 539 yards in 10 games.

Holovak and Fred Naumetz were elected as co-captain of the 1942 Boston College Eagles football team. The Eagles entered the final game of the season as the top-ranked team, but were upset by arch-rival Holy Cross 55–12 at Fenway Park, a defeat that canceled a victory party that night at the Cocoanut Grove nightclub. That decision proved to be chillingly profound when a horrendous fire swept through the building that night with 492 fatalities and hundreds more injured. In the 1943 Orange Bowl, Holovak rushed for 158 yards and scored all three of Boston College's touchdowns in their 37–21 loss to Alabama. He earned consensus first-team All-American honors and was fourth in the voting for the Heisman Trophy.

== Military service ==
After graduating from BC, Holovak enlisted in the United States Navy and, following officer training, was subsequently commissioned as an officer in the rank of Ensign, U.S. Naval Reserve. He attended the Melville Motor Torpedo Boat Squadrons Training Center in Melville, Rhode Island and commanded a PT boat in the Pacific. He was credited with sinking nine Japanese ships and overcame a bout with malaria that left him unconscious for a week. His brother Pete was killed in action at Tarawa on February 3, 1944.

In 1945, Holovak returned to the Melville Motor Torpedo Boat Squadrons Training Center and coached the installation's football team. On October 20, the Melville PT Raiders lost to the Army Cadets football team 55–13 at Michie Stadium.

== Professional career ==
The Cleveland Rams selected Holovak in the first round with the fifth overall pick in the 1943 NFL draft. On January 19, 1946, he signed with the now Los Angeles Rams. During his only season with the team, he gained 211 yards and scored three touchdowns.

In 1947, Holovak was traded to the Chicago Bears for halfback Dante Magnani. He rushed for 509 yards and 3 touchdowns in his two seasons with the Bears.

== Coaching career ==
In 1949, Holovak returned to Boston College as freshman football coach. He was promoted to varsity head coach on December 30, 1950.

In his first five years, Holovak compiled a mark of 25–16–3 and won Coach of the Year honors in 1954 from New England football writers. Those efforts were good enough to earn him a new four-year contract on November 22, 1955. He complied four more winning seasons, however after early seasons losses to Navy and Army and an upset loss to Boston University, Holovak began receiving "abuse from the stands" and a small, but vocal group of alumni pushed for him to be replaced. With his contract expiring, Holovak resigned by request at the end of the season.

On November 16, 1959, Boston business executive Billy Sullivan was awarded the eighth and final franchise of the developing American Football League. On December 17, Holovak became the team's first hire. Initially hired as a scout, he joined the coaching staff for the Boston Patriots' inaugural season. After a 2–3 start to the 1961 season, head coach Lou Saban was fired and replaced by Holovak. The Patriots went 7–1–1 in their nine games after the coaching change and Holovak was given a two-year contract.

In 1963, the Patriots finished with a 7–6–1 record. This was good enough for a tie for first place in the Eastern Division, which necessitated a playoff with the other 7-6-1 team in the Buffalo Bills. In the Eastern Division playoff, they prevailed 26–8 to move on to the AFC title game, but they were then pounded 51–10 in the AFL Championship game by the San Diego Chargers.

In 1964, Holovak added the duties of general manager to his job description. The Patriots improved to 10–3–1 (good for second behind Buffalo) and he was named AP AFL Coach of the Year.

The team slipped to 4–8–2 in 1965, but rebounded into contention the next season with the addition of rookie running back Jim Nance. Needing only a victory in their final game against the New York Jets on December 17 to reach the AFL title contest, the Patriots instead saw their season end with a 38–28 upset loss. Despite missing the playoffs, Holovak was named UPI American Football League Coach of the Year and rewarded with a contract extension.

Age finally caught up with the team over the next two years with the Patriots managing only a 7–20–1 record. The result was that Holovak was fired from both positions on January 7, 1969, ending his Patriots tenure with a mark of 53–47–9. As in his previous stint at Boston College, Holovak saw growing fan discontent, including chants of "Goodbye Mike", play a role in the decision. He was the winningest coach in Patriots history until Bill Belichick passed him in the 2005 season opener.

In 1969, Holovak became the offensive backfield coach for the San Francisco 49ers. After two years with the 49ers, Holovak remained in the Bay Area by accepting the post of receivers coach with the Raiders on March 6, 1971.

In 1972, he joined the New York Jets as a scout. He returned to sidelines the following year as running backs coach. Holovak moved to the front office in 1975, but when Jets head coach Lou Holtz resigned before the final game of the season, Holovak handled the duties in a 42–3 loss to the Cincinnati Bengals on December 12.

== Executive career ==
On February 18, 1969, Holovak was appointed to the Massachusetts State Racing Commission by governor Francis Sargent. His coaching duties outside of the state led to poor attendance at commission meetings and he resigned in 1971 due to the "press of other duties".

In 1975, Holovak was named director of player personnel for the New York Jets. He rejoined the Patriots in 1977 as a personnel assistant. In 1979, he was promoted to director of college scouting.

In 1981, Holovak was named assistant general manager of the Houston Oilers. He helped build Oilers teams that made the playoffs in 1987 and 1988. In 1989, he was promoted to GM following the resignation of Ladd Herzeg. The Oilers made the playoffs every season during Holovak's tenure, but were on the losing end of the largest comeback in postseason history and had an extremely tumultuous 1993 season. Holovak was fired on January 26, 1994 and replaced by his assistant, Floyd Reese. He remained a scout for the franchise, which later shifted to Tennessee, until retiring in 1999.

== Personal life ==
On September 11, 1943, Holovak married Edith Casavant in her hometown of Natick, Massachusetts. Fred Naumetz was Holovak's best man and Wally Boudreau and Wally Lemm served as ushers. Their eldest daughter, Michelle, was the wife of Massachusetts state representative and judge David E. Harrison. Their younger daughter, Terry Ann, was killed in a car crash shortly after graduating from high school.

In 1980, Holovak married Pauline Scudder. They moved to Sarasota, Florida in 1988.

On January 27, 2008, Holovak, who had been suffering from alzheimer's disease died in Ruskin, Florida from complications from pneumonia. He was 88 years old.

== Head coaching record ==
=== College ===
Year	Team	Overall	Bowl/playoffs
Boston College Eagles (Independent) (1951–1959)
1951	Boston College	3–6	
1952	Boston College	4–4–1	
1953	Boston College	5–3–1	
1954	Boston College	8–1	
1955	Boston College	5–2–1	
1956	Boston College	5–4	
1957	Boston College	7–2	
1958	Boston College	7–3	
1959	Boston College	5–4	
Boston College:		49–29–3	
Total:		49–29–3	

=== NFL/AFL ===
Team	Year	Regular Season					Postseason			
Team	Year	Won	Lost	Ties	Win %	Finish	Won	Lost	Win %	Result
BOS	1961	7	1	1	.833	2nd in AFL Eastern	–	–	–	–
BOS	1962	9	4	1	.679	2nd in AFL Eastern	–	–	–	–
BOS	1963	7	6	1	.536	1st in AFL Eastern	1	1	.500	Lost to San Diego Chargers in AFL Championship Game.
BOS	1964	10	3	1	.750	2nd in AFL Eastern	–	–	–	–
BOS	1965	4	8	2	.357	3rd in AFL Eastern	–	–	–	–
BOS	1966	8	4	2	.643	2nd in AFL Eastern	–	–	–	–
BOS	1967	3	10	1	.250	5th in AFL Eastern	–	–	–	–
BOS	1968	4	10	0	.286	4th in AFL Eastern	–	–	–	–
BOS Total		52	46	9	.528		1	1	.500	
NYJ*	1976	0	1	0	.000	4th in AFC East	–	–	–	–
NYJ Total		0	1	0	.000		–	–	–	
Total		52	47	9	.523		1	1	.500	
