= Larry Garron =

American football player (1937–2019)

No. 40
- Position: Fullback

Personal information
- Born: May 23, 1937; Marks, Mississippi, U.S.
- Died: September 13, 2019 (aged 82); Framingham, Massachusetts, U.S.
- Listed height: 6 ft 0 in (1.83 m)
- Listed weight: 195 lb (88 kg)

Career information
- High school: Argo (IL)
- College: Western Illinois
- NFL draft: 1960: undrafted

Career history
- Boston Patriots (1960–1968)

Awards and highlights
- 4× AFL All-Star (1961, 1963, 1964, 1967); Boston Patriots All-1960s Team
- Stats at Pro Football Reference

Lawrence Jr. Garron (May 23, 1937 – September 13, 2019) was an American professional football player. A fullback, halfback and flanker he played college football at Western Illinois University, then played professionally in the American Football League (AFL) for the Boston Patriots from 1960 through 1968. He holds the team record run of 85 yards from scrimmage, set in a game against the Buffalo Bills on October 22, 1961. He averaged 5.9 yards per carry in 1962 and accounted for 1,168 total yards from scrimmage in 1963. He is in the top 10 in Patriots history for most total rushing yards, all-purpose yardage and kickoff return yards.

== Early life ==
Garron was born on May 23, 1937, in Marks, Mississippi. He was the eldest of nine or 10 brothers and sisters. His father moved the family to Argo, Illinois. Garron's father had attempted to become a boxer, and befriended Joe Louis, whom Garron would meet in later life. Garron attended Argo High School, in Summit, Illinois, where he was considered an excellent student-athlete. During high school he was a reporter for a local newspaper. He was the first person in his family to attend college.

Garron played on Argo's football team. As a junior (1954) and senior (1955), the league's coaches selected Garron first-team All-South Suburban League, at end; doing so unanimously in 1955.

He also played on the school's basketball team. As a 5 ft 11 in (1.80 m) guard in 1956, Garron's senior season, he was selected by the Suburban League's basketball coaches to the All-South Suburban second-team. In 1955, the basketball coaches had also selected Garron to the All-South Suburban second-team, at forward.

== College career ==
Garron attended Western Illinois University (WIU), in Macomb, Illinois. From 1957 to 1959, he played football for the Leathernecks, under head coach Lou Saban, as part of the Interstate Intercollegiate Athletic Conference (IIAC). In 1959, the team went undefeated (9–0); and Garron was selected first-team All-IIAC at halfback. This is the only undefeated and untied team in WIU history, and in 1989 the 1959 team was inducted into the school's Athletics Hall of Fame. Garron played his final game that season with a dislocated shoulder, suffered while wrestling, and still scored three touchdowns against Central Michigan to secure the IIAC title.

Before a game against Arkansas State in October 1959, played in Jonesboro, Arkansas, Saban had received death threats that were racist in nature. He knew Garron was level-headed and made him team captain for the game. Garron ran the first kickoff of the game back for a touchdown. On a later kickoff, he was forced out of bounds. Some of the Arkansas State fans pounced on Garron, and stomped on his legs. In the week after winning the game, Saban said "'We expected to get the business in a one-shot deal down South, but we didn't expect Arkansas to be so good'"; noting that some of his players said they had never been hit so hard in a football game. Saban told the press that after the game ended the Arkansas State crowd acknowledged Garron for a well-played game.

Coming out of high school, Garron visited the University of Kansas, hoping to get a basketball scholarship. The coach introduced him to the team's center, future Naismith Memorial Basketball Hall of Fame member Wilt Chamberlain, and Garron realized his hope was unrealistic. As a member of WIU's track team, he competed years later in the high jump against Chamberlain at the Drake Relays. Garron and Chamberlain continued to stay in contact over the ensuing years.

== Professional career ==
In 1960, Garron was a running back on the first Boston Patriots team in the inaugural season of the American Football League (AFL), and played for the Patriots from 1960 to 1968, wearing No. 40. At the time of Garron’s death in 2019, Patriots owner Robert Kraft called Garron "'a member of the Patriots' family since Day 1'". Garron's first NFL head coach was his college head coach, Lou Saban, having been hired to coach the Patriots after his perfect 9–0 season at Western Illinois. Saban recruited Garron to the Patriots.

Garron made the 1960 Patriots team, but started only one game and only had eight rushing attempts in four games. Saban cut Garron a few games into the season because of his size. Garron had injuries and a bout of tonsilitis, and his weight fell to 160 pounds (72.6 kg). He was told to go home and put on 20 pounds (9.1 kg). He used the time away from the team to lift weights and build himself up, returning to the Patriots for the 1961 season 40 pounds (18.1 kg) heavier than when he left. The 1960 team was 5–9, and Saban was fired as head coach after five games of the 1961 season, with a 2–3 record, and he went to work as head of personnel for the Buffalo Bills, the Patriots arch rival.

Garron started six games for the Patriots in 1961. He had a 67-yard touchdown run in the season's third game against the Bills. In the Patriots' second game against the Bills that season, on October 22, 1961, he had an 85-yard touchdown run. This still remains the longest run from scrimmage by a Patriot, over 60 years later. Earlier in the season, he returned a kickoff 89 yards for a touchdown against the Houston Oilers. On the season, Garron gained 389 yards rushing, with a 5.6 yards per carry average, and had 24 pass receptions for 341 yards, with two rushing touchdowns and three receiving touchdowns. He was selected to play in the 1961 AFL All-Star game. After Mike Holovak took over for Saban, the team went 7–1–1.

Garron started five games in 1962, rushing for 392 yards in 67 carries (5.9 yards per carry) with two rushing touchdowns. He had 18 receptions for 236 yards and three more touchdowns. As a team, under Holovak they again went 9–4–1 in 1962. In a November 3, 1962 game against the Bills, Garron had a 95-yard kickoff return for a touchdown. He also had a 23-yard touchdown reception in the fourth quarter that resulted in the game ending in a 28–28 tie.

In 1963, Garron became a full-time starter at fullback, with 12 starts and a career-high 750 yards in 175 carries (4.2 yards per carry) and two rushing touchdowns. He also had 26 receptions for a career-high 418 receiving yards (16.1 yards per catch) and two receiving touchdowns. He was again named to the AFL All-Star Game. The team fell to 7–6–1, but made the playoffs. In 1963, the Newspaper Enterprise Association (NEA) polled the eight AFL coaches to select its All-AFL team, and Garron was named second-team All-AFL at running back.

The Patriots defeated the Buffalo Bills, now coached by Lou Saban, in the first round of the 1963 AFL playoffs, 26–8. Garron caught touchdown passes of 59 and 17 yards from Babe Parilli. Overall, Garron had four receptions for 120 yards and 19 rushing attempts for 44 yards in the game; being both the leading runner and receiver for the winning Patriots. Before the game, Garron saw the field in Buffalo was slippery, and decided to use baseball cleats for better traction, instead of his normal footwear, giving him an advantage in the game. The Patriots lost the 1963 AFL Championship Game to the San Diego Chargers, 51–10. Garron scored the Patriots only touchdown.

Garron believed that the Chargers had sent spies into the Patriots practices, whom he observed, so that when the actual game came it was as if the Chargers knew the Patriots plays in advance. Boston sportswriter Will McDonough, a member of the National Sportscasters and Sportswriters Hall of Fame and a pioneering television sports analyst, similarly stated that the Chargers had disguised spies attend Patriots practices before the championship game. However, days before the game, Patriots coach Holovak also willingly had given considerable details about his game plan to McDonough in a published interview.

In 1964, the Patriots were 10–3–1 and Garron was again chosen to play in the AFL All-Star Game. On the year, he rushed for 585 yards in a career-high 183 carries, with two rushing touchdowns. He had career highs with 40 receptions and seven receiving touchdowns; and his nine total touchdowns tied for his career-high. He started all 14 games for the only time in his career. He had surgery to remove cartilage from his right knee in 1964.

Garron was one of 21 African American players chosen to play in the AFL All-Star Game in January 1965. The game was originally to be held in New Orleans. Once in New Orleans, however, the black players experienced racial discrimination in the days leading up to the game. Among other things, they were refused entrance in business establishments, subjected to racist name-calling and faced transportation issues such as taxis refusing to pick them up. Garron stated that one restaurant owner drew a gun on the 6 ft 9 in (2.06 m) Ernie Ladd and told Ladd he could not come in the restaurant to eat.

The black players refused to play in the All-Star Game and some of them began leaving New Orleans. The league moved the game to Houston, as it was still an important source of income for the players' pension fund. Garron said at the time the black players had been misled about how they would be treated in New Orleans, being told segregation barriers would be gone and the black players could come and go in New Orleans as they wished. Garron said had they been told the truth about the realities in New Orleans, the conflict likely never would have happened.

Garron suffered a broken collarbone in an August 1965 preseason game, and did not play in the first four games of the 1965 season, all of which the Patriots lost. He went on to start eight games at fullback that season, but only had 259 yards in 74 attempts, as the team finished 4–8–2.

In 1966, the Patriots improved to 8–4–2. Jim Nance became the starter at fullback, a position that had never been a natural fit for the 195 lb. (88.5 kg) Garron. Nance led the AFL in rushing attempts, yards, yards per carry and touchdowns, with Garron becoming a halfback and flanker. In an October 23, 1966 game against the San Diego Chargers, Garron caught two 53-yard touchdown passes from Babe Parilli and rushed for a third touchdown. On December 11, 1966 against the Houston Oilers, Garron had two more touchdown receptions from Parilli, including a 61-yard touchdown catch.

On the 1966 season, Garron had 319 rushing yards on 101 attempts with four rushing touchdowns, and 30 receptions for 416 yards (13.9 yards per catch) and five receiving touchdowns. He and Nance combined for almost 2,300 yards from scrimmage, and had 20 touchdowns between them.

In 1967, Garron was selected to play in the AFL All-Star Game for the fourth and final time of his career. On the season, he started nine games, with 30 receptions for 507 yards (16.9 yards per catch) and five touchdown receptions. He had 163 rushing yards in 46 carries. However, the Patriots fell to 3–10–1.

Garron carried the ball 14 times for 61 yards in the first game of the 1968 season. After only one carry, Garron injured his left knee during the second game of the 1968 season against the New York Jets, played at Legion Field in Birmingham, Alabama. He had 20 carries the next week against the Denver Broncos, for only 34 yards. When he tried to play the following week, he was unable to play and came out after one rushing attempt. This was the last game of his professional career. He underwent left knee surgery in November. Garron retired in July 1969.

Over his nine-year career with the Patriots, Garron rushed for 2,981 yards, averaging 3.9 yards per carry. He is 10th all-time among Patriots players for most career rushing yards (through the 2024 season). He had 185 receptions for 2,502 yards, with a 13.5 yards per reception average. He returned 89 kickoffs for 2,299 yards (fifth best in Patriots' history), averaging 25.8 yards per return. He had 7,805 all-purpose yards; ninth best all-time for the Patriots. Garron scored 40 touchdowns: 14 rushing, 26 receiving and two on kickoff returns.

== Broadcasting ==
While still playing Garron worked as a sportscaster for WCAS in Cambridge, Massachusetts.

In 1971, along with Bob Fouracre as the play-by-play announcer, Garron served as a color commentator for New England Patriots preseason games.

== Honors ==
In 1974, Garron was inducted into the WIU Athletics Hall of Fame, individually; and in 1989 was inducted again as part of the 1959 WIU football team.

In 1971, Patriots fans selected Garron to the Patriots All-Time AFL/1960s team.

== Personal life and death ==
Garron moved to Framingham, Massachusetts during his playing days. While still playing, he worked in a special capacity for a dairy company, H. P. Hood and Sons. He remained in New England after retiring from football, teaching marketing, writing, economics, and management at Bunker Hill Community College. He worked as a manufacturers representative in electronics. Even during his playing days, he became a fervent Boston Celtics basketball fan, attending many of their games. He coached Pop Warner football and was a mentor to young athletes; and was a martial arts teacher.

Garron completed his college degree at the Hakkoryu Institute in Japan in 1984, and in 1986 earned a master's degree at Cambridge College.

Garron had athletically talented sons and other family members, including nephew Donald Garron, who won the 1981 Massachusetts All State 220-yard championship in 22.37. Donald Garron played football at Boston College with Doug Flutie, scoring on a 44-yard touchdown run the very first time he took a handoff in a game. Garron's brother-in-law Rufus Harris, his wife Laberta's younger brother, was a basketball star at the University of Maine and had a tryout with the Boston Celtics in 1980.

In 1991, Garron's sons Arnold and Andre were inducted into the University of New Hampshire Athletics Hall of Fame for football and track. Andre signed a contract with the Kansas City Chiefs in May 1986, after graduating college. The Chiefs placed him on the injured list in August 1986. He played for the Chiefs in the 1987 preseason, at running back; but was waived at the end of August before the season started. He does not appear on the Chiefs' NFL roster in 1986 or 1987. Arnold Garron was drafted by the Denver Gold of the United States Football League in 1984. He signed with the Washington Redskins in May 1984, but was released at the end of July. He signed with the New England Patriots in February 1985. He does not appear on Washington's 1984 NFL roster, or the Patriot's 1985 roster.

It has also been stated that Andre played professionally for the Kansas City Chiefs as a running back and kick returner for two seasons in the late 1980s. Arnold played professionally in the NFL one year for the New England Patriots and one year for the Washington Redskins as a defensive back.

At the same time Larry Garron was on the Patriots he studied various forms of martial arts. He held ranks in Kenpō (fist law), Hakkō-ryū Jujutsu, Gōjū-ryū (hard soft system), Shintō Musō-ryū, Yoshitsune Jujitsu, and Taekwondo. Later in life he opened Buke Do Martial Arts Academy in Southborough, Massachusetts.

He died on September 13 or 14, 2019 at the age of 82.

== See also ==
- List of American Football League players
