= Dick Felt =

American football player (1933–2012)

No. 23, 24
- Position: Defensive back

Personal information
- Born: March 4, 1933; Lehi, Utah, U.S.
- Died: November 17, 2012 (aged 79); Provo, Utah, U.S.
- Listed height: 6 ft 1 in (1.85 m)
- Listed weight: 185 lb (84 kg)

Career information
- High school: Lehi (UT)
- College: BYU
- AFL draft: 1960

Career history
- New York Titans (1960–1961); Boston Patriots (1962–1966)

Awards and highlights
- 3× First-team All-AFL (1962–1964); 2× AFL All-Star (1961, 1962)
- Stats at Pro Football Reference

Richard George Felt (March 4, 1933 – November 17, 2012) was an American football defensive back who played college football at Brigham Young University (BYU) and professionally in the American Football League (AFL) for the New York Titans and the Boston Patriots. He scored the winning touchdown for the Titans against the Buffalo Bills in the Thanksgiving Day game of November 23, 1961. Felt was a two-time AFL All-Star selection.

== See also ==
- List of American Football League players
