= Tom Addison =

American football player (1936–2011)

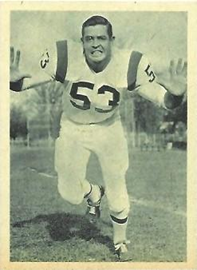
- Addison in 1961

No. 53
- Position: Linebacker

Personal information
- Born: April 12, 1936; Lancaster, South Carolina, U.S.
- Died: June 14, 2011 (aged 75); Bluffton, South Carolina, U.S.
- Listed height: 6 ft 2 in (1.88 m)
- Listed weight: 230 lb (104 kg)

Career information
- High school: Lancaster
- College: South Carolina (1954–1957)
- NFL draft: 1958: 12th round, 141st overall pick

Career history
- Philadelphia Eagles (1960)*; Boston Patriots (1960–1967)
- * Offseason or practice squad member only

Awards and highlights
- First-team All-AFL (1961); 3× Second-team All-AFL (1962-64); 4× AFL All-Star (1961–1964); Boston Patriots All-1960s Team

Career AFL statistics
- Interceptions: 16
- Total touchdowns: 1
- Sacks: 15
- Stats at Pro Football Reference

Thomas Marion Addison (April 12, 1936 – June 14, 2011) was an American professional football linebacker, sports labor leader, and is a member of the South Carolina Athletic Hall of Fame.

== Playing career ==
Addison attended the University of South Carolina and was drafted by the Baltimore Colts of the National Football League (NFL) and the Ottawa Rough Riders of the Canadian Football League (CFL), but chose to sign in 1960 with the Boston Patriots of the newly formed American Football League (AFL), playing his entire pro career with the Patriots.

Considered a leader of the newly formed team, Addison was selected as team captain, and was named to the AFL All-Star team for four straight years(1961–1964), as well as being one of the first players ever selected to be a Patriot All-League player (in 1960). He was also a Sporting News' All-League player in 1963 and 1964, and an AFL Eastern Division All-Star in 1961 and 1962. With 16 career interceptions (returning one for a touchdown), he was considered by some to be the best AFL linebacker against the run in the mid-1960s.

Addison played in every Patriots' game from 1961 to 1966 (84 games), and was adding to this total when he sustained what proved to be a career-ending knee injury. On June 18, 1968, he was released by the Patriots after team doctors stated that he would risk further damage by playing after having undergone two knee operations. Addison was selected by a Patriot fan vote in 1971 as a member of the Patriots' All-1960s (AFL) Team.

== Labor leadership ==
On January 14, 1964, players in the American Football League formed the AFL Players Association, and Addison was elected the union's first president.

In search of protection for the players, Addison put together a request package of benefits that included insurance and a player pension plan. As president, Addison had the intimidating task of meeting with the team owners to communicate the request. Upon entering the meeting room, Addison approached the long oval table, where the stern-faced owners were awaiting. With Southern charm, he looked up at the owners, smiled, and said "Well, I'm not trying to be the next Jimmy Hoffa!" This broke the tension, and started a period of perhaps the most positive relationship between owners and players in team sports history.

With a players association in place, players newly drafted by American Football League teams in the "war between the leagues" could be assured that they would have representation and protection in the AFL that was the equal of that in the older league. Addison's work was an important element in the survival of the league, and helped the AFL to be able to compete for top talent, and to establish itself as the future of Professional Football.

== See also ==
- List of American Football League players
