= Larry Eisenhauer =

American football player (1940–2020)

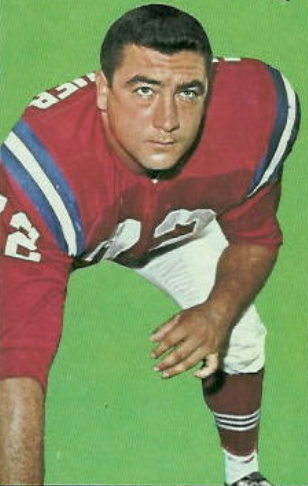
- Eisenhauer on a 1966 Topps football card

No. 72
- Position: Defensive end

Personal information
- Born: February 22, 1940; Hicksville, New York, U.S.
- Died: January 29, 2020 (aged 79); Jupiter, Florida, U.S.
- Listed height: 6 ft 5 in (1.96 m)
- Listed weight: 250 lb (113 kg)

Career information
- High school: Chaminade (Mineola, New York)
- College: Boston College
- AFL draft: 1961: 6th round, 44th overall pick

Career history
- Boston Patriots (1961–1969)

Awards and highlights
- 4× AFL All-Star (1962, 1963, 1964, 1966); 2× AFL sacks leader (1963, 1965); Boston Patriots All-1960s Team; New England Patriots 35th Anniversary Team

Career statistics
- Games played: 115
- Stats at Pro Football Reference

Lawrence Conway Eisenhauer (February 22, 1940 – January 29, 2020) was an American professional football player who was a defensive end for the Boston Patriots of the American Football League (AFL). A graduate of Chaminade High School in Mineola, New York, he was a college football standout for the Boston College Eagles and was one of several Boston-area athletes to join the Patriots. He was nicknamed "Wildman" by his Patriot teammates because of his unpredictable antics, such as running out onto Kansas City's snow-covered Municipal Stadium field clad in only his helmet and athletic supporter, hitting his head on metal locker doors or ramming his forearms through locker room walls to motivate himself. Eisenhauer was an AFL All-Star in 1962, 1963, 1964 and 1966, and is a member of the Patriots All-1960s (AFL) Team.

Eisenhauer is in the Boston College Athletic Hall of Fame.

He died on January 29, 2020, aged 79.

== See also ==
- List of American Football League players
