= 1963 American Football League season =

American Football League season

1963 AFL season

Regular season
- Duration: September 7 – December 22, 1963

Playoffs
- Date: December 28, 1963 – January 5, 1964
- Eastern champion: Boston Patriots (playoff)
- Western champion: San Diego Chargers
- Site: Balboa Stadium, San Diego, California
- Champion: San Diego Chargers

AFL teams: West, East

The 1963 AFL season was the fourth regular season of the American Football League.

The season ended when the San Diego Chargers defeated the Boston Patriots in the AFL championship game – to this date the only major league championship won by the Chargers and the city of San Diego.

The original eight franchises of 1960 remained, but two underwent name changes, with one relocating. The Titans of New York changed their team colors and were renamed the New York Jets; the defending AFL champion Dallas Texans moved north to Missouri and became the Kansas City Chiefs.

== Division races ==
As with the previous three seasons, the AFL had 8 teams, split into two divisions. Every team played two games against the others for a total of 14 games, and the division winners met in the AFL championship game. If there was a tie in the standings at the top of either division, a one-game playoff was held to determine the division winner. San Diego led the Western Division for the entire season, with the Oakland Raiders following one game behind from Week Eight onward. The Raiders had started at 2–0, then lost four straight, then began a winning streak. Starting from a 2–4 handicap was insurmountable, and although Oakland beat San Diego twice (34–33 on October 27, and 41–27 on December 8), they were unable to catch up.

The Eastern race changed in Week Seven, after the Jets lost to Oakland, 49–26, and the Patriots and Houston Oilers tied at 4–3–0 for the lead. Houston, winner of the first three Eastern titles, pulled ahead the next week, and Boston beat them 45–3 the week after that; the next week, Boston lost 7–6 to San Diego, while Houston beat the Jets 31–27 to pull ahead again. Two weeks later (Week Twelve), San Diego beat Houston 27–0, while Boston led again after a 17–7 win over the Buffalo Bills. In Week Thirteen, Boston was at 7–5–1, and Buffalo and Houston right behind. In the final week, spoiler San Diego took out Houston, 20–14. Buffalo won 19–10 over the Jets, while Boston lost 35–3 at Kansas City, giving the Bills and Pats records of 7–6–1 and forcing a one-game playoff, for a spot in the AFL Championship game.

The season schedule itself was pushed back a week from what was originally planned, owing to the assassination of President Kennedy, which resulted in the AFL moving games from that weekend (i.e., the weekend of November 23–24) to the weekend of December 21–22. Since only three games had been scheduled, with Boston and Buffalo both having a bye, it meant that the Patriots and Bills finished their regular schedule on Saturday, December 14, a week before the league's other six teams did. Consequently, the Patriots and Bills could have played their tiebreaker playoff on December 22, potentially leaving the AFL Championship Game for the next weekend (the originally scheduled date), since they knew after games of December 15 that they and they alone had tied for the division title. However, the Western Division race had not yet been decided and Chargers and Raiders owners Barron Hilton and Al Davis respectively objected to playing the Eastern playoff "early" on the grounds that it would have given the Eastern winner an unfair advantage in terms of rest in case the Chargers and Raiders also had to play a tiebreaker. The Chargers won their last game and with it won the West outright, nevertheless the Bills-Patriots Eastern Division playoff was not played until after the following week on Saturday, December 28 (the day before the Chicago-New York NFL Championship Game). This meant that the Boston-San Diego championship game was not played until January 5, 1964. Thus was held the second professional playoff game ever held in January (with the AFL's first ever title playoff on January 1, 1961, being the only time before then that that had occurred). As it happened, the Patriots-Chargers playoff was also latest date on which a non-Super Bowl playoff game was ever held, and it retained that record until the AFC and NFC Championship Games of January 7, 1979. No 14-game season ever ended later.

Week	Eastern	Record	Western	Record
1	Boston	1–0–0	3 teams	1–0–0
2	Tie (Bos, Hou)	1–1–0	Tie (Oak, SD)	2–0–0
3	Boston	2–1–0	Tie (SD, KC)	2–0–0
4	N.Y. Jets	2–1–0	San Diego	3–0–0
5	N.Y. Jets	3–1–0	San Diego	3–1–0
6	N.Y. Jets	3–2–0	San Diego	4–1–0
7	Tie (Bos, Hou)	4–3–0	San Diego	5–1–0
8	Houston	5–3–0	San Diego	5–2–0
9	Tie (Bos, Hou)	5–4–0	San Diego	6–2–0
10	Houston	6–4–0	San Diego	7–2–0
11	Houston	6–4–0	San Diego	8–2–0
12	Tie (Bos, Hou)	6–5–1	San Diego	9–2–0
13	Boston	7–5–1	San Diego	9–3–0
14	Tie (Bos, Buf)	7–6–1	San Diego	10–3–0
15	(tie) Boston	7–6–1	San Diego	11–3–0
	Buffalo	7–6–1		

== Regular season ==
The defending champion Dallas Texans relocated to Kansas City, Missouri, and changed the team's name to the Kansas City Chiefs. Meanwhile, the New York Titans went under new ownership and changed their name to the New York Jets as they prepared to move from the Polo Grounds in upper Manhattan to Shea Stadium in Queens near LaGuardia Airport, and their colors went from navy blue and gold to green and white.

=== Results ===
Home/Road		Eastern Division				Western Division			
Home/Road		BOS	BUF	HOU	NY	DEN	KC	OAK	SD
Eastern	Boston Patriots		17–7	45–3	38–14	40–21	24–24	20–14	6–7
Eastern	Buffalo Bills	28–21		20–31	45–14	27–17	27–27	12–0	13–23
Eastern	Houston Oilers	28–46	28–14		31–27	20–14	28–7	13–24	14–20
Eastern	New York Jets	31–24	10–19	24–17		35–35	17–0	10–7	7–53
Western	Denver Broncos	14–10	28–30	24–33	9–14		7–59	10–26	50–34
Western	Kansas City Chiefs	35–3	26–35	28–7	48–0	52–21		7–22	17–38
Western	Oakland Raiders	14–20	35–17	52–49	49–26	35–31	10–7		41–27
Western	San Diego Chargers	17–13	14–10	27–0	24–20	58–20	24–10	33–34	

=== Standings ===
AFL Eastern Division
	W	L	T	PCT	DIV	PF	PA	STK
Boston Patriots	7	6	1	.538	4–2	327	257	L1
Buffalo Bills	7	6	1	.538	3–3	304	291	W2
Houston Oilers	6	8	0	.429	3–3	302	372	L4
New York Jets	5	8	1	.385	2–4	249	399	L3

Note: Tie games were not officially counted in the standings in the AFL.

AFL Western Division
	W	L	T	PCT	DIV	PF	PA	STK
San Diego Chargers	11	3	0	.786	3–3	399	255	W2
Oakland Raiders	10	4	0	.714	6–0	363	282	W8
Kansas City Chiefs	5	7	2	.417	2–4	347	263	W3
Denver Broncos	2	11	1	.154	1–5	301	473	L7

== Playoffs ==
- Eastern Division playoff
  Boston Patriots 26, Buffalo Bills 8, on December 28 at War Memorial Stadium in Buffalo, New York
- AFL Championship Game
  San Diego Chargers 51, Boston Patriots 10, on January 5, 1964, at Balboa Stadium in San Diego, California

== Stadium changes ==
- The Boston Patriots moved from Nickerson Field to Fenway Park
- The relocated Kansas City Chiefs moved from the Cotton Bowl in Dallas to Municipal Stadium in Kansas City

== Coaching changes ==
- New York Jets: Weeb Ewbank replaced Bulldog Turner.
- Oakland Raiders: Al Davis joined the team as head coach and general manager. Marty Feldman was fired after five games into 1962, and Red Conkright then served as interim.

== See also ==
- 1963 NFL season
