= 1963 San Diego Chargers season =

4th season in franchise history; first and only league championship win

- Owner: Barron Hilton
- General manager: Sid Gillman
- Head coach: Sid Gillman
- Home stadium: Balboa Stadium

Results
- Record: 11–3
- Division place: 1st Western Division
- Playoffs: Won AFL Championship (vs. Patriots) 51–10
- All-AFL: 11: FL Lance Alworth (1st team); S/K George Blair (2nd team); DE Earl Faison (1st team); CB Dick Harris (2nd team); TE Dave Kocourek (2nd team); RB Keith Lincoln (1st team); RB Paul Lowe (2nd team); T Ron Mix (1st team); C Don Rogers (2nd team); QB Tobin Rote (1st team); CB Dick Westmoreland (2nd team)
- AFL All-Stars: 11: LB Chuck Allen; FL Lance Alworth; DE Earl Faison; LB Emil Karas; TE Dave Kocourek; DT Ernie Ladd; RB Keith Lincoln; RB Paul Lowe; T Ron Mix; QB Tobin Rote; T Ernie Wright

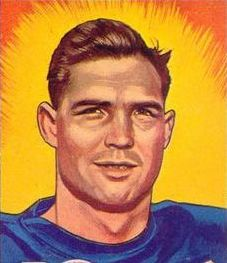
Tobin Rote had spent 13 seasons in the NFL and CFL before becoming the Chargers' starting quarterback.

The 1963 San Diego Chargers season was the team's fourth in the American Football League. The team had gone 4–10 in 1962 but rebounded with an 11–3 record, winning the AFL West by one game over the Oakland Raiders, who were coached by former Chargers assistant Al Davis. San Diego scored the most points in the league and conceded the fewest. Their offense, led by veteran quarterback Tobin Rote, and featuring future Hall of Fame receiver Lance Alworth, gained more yards than any other team; Rote and Alworth were each named the league MVP, by the Associated Press and UPI, respectively.

On January 5, 1964, the team won their only AFL Championship with a 51–10 win over the Boston Patriots in Balboa Stadium. To date, this is the Chargers' only league championship season in the AFL or NFL. This is also the only world championship won by a major league sports team in the city and county of San Diego to date. In 2003, the team was inducted into the Chargers Ring of Honor. The emphatic title game victory led to some speculation on whether San Diego might be able to beat the NFL champion Chicago Bears.

The 1963 Chargers earned a degree of lasting notoriety due to their program of anabolic steroid usage, the first such in professional football. Head coach Sid Gillman and strength coach Alvin Roy made daily doses of Dianabol compulsory for a five-week period during training camp before players became aware of potential side effects, and the program was relaxed to a voluntary one.

== Offseason ==
=== AFL draft ===
The 1963 AFL draft took place on December 1, 1962, late in the previous season. The Chargers had 30 picks across 29 rounds.

With the second overall pick in the draft, San Diego selected Syracuse end Walt Sweeney. The Cleveland Browns also selected Sweeney in the rival NFL draft. Representatives of both teams approached the player with contracts in the moments after his final college game on December 8, looking to claim his signature. Sweeney chose the Chargers; he had actually met with head coach Sid Gillman and assistant Al Davis the previous day and signed a contract while still a college player. The team converted him to a guard, about which Sweeney was not initially enthusiastic, but he went on to excel at that position through an 11-year stay in San Diego, appearing in six AFL All-Star games and three NFL Pro Bowls, as well as being named to the AFL All-League Team twice.

The Chargers also signed their 2nd-round pick, seeing off competition from the Los Angeles Rams for All-American guard Rufus Guthrie. However, Guthrie was injured in the opening exhibition game of the season with torn knee ligaments. The injury persisted, and Guthrie never played a regular season game for the Chargers or any other pro team. 3rd-round selection Keith Kinderman, a defensive back who Gillman converted to running back, was also troubled by injuries. He played in 11 games over two seasons in San Diego, carrying the ball only 24 times. There was one future Hall of Fame player in the Chargers' draft class (linebacker Dave Robinson), but he signed for the Green Bay Packers, where he won two Super Bowls.

In the later rounds, San Diego picked up Bob Petrich, a defensive end who played in every game for the next four seasons, and Ernie Park, an occasional starter at guard. Only five of the draft class ever played a game for the Chargers (including Guthrie's exhibition appearance), while eleven went to NFL teams.

1963 San Diego Chargers draft
| Round | Pick | Player | Position | College | Notes |
|---|---|---|---|---|---|
| 1 | 2 | Walt Sweeney * | Guard | Syracuse | 107th pick in NFL draft |
| 2 | 10 | Rufus Guthrie | Guard | Georgia Tech | 10th pick in NFL draft |
| 3 | 17 | Dave Robinson † | Linebacker | Penn State | 14th pick in NFL draft; signed by Green Bay Packers |
| 3 | 18 | Keith Kinderman | Fullback | Florida State | 104th pick in NFL draft |
| 4 | 26 | Roy Williams | Defensive tackle | Pacific | 27th pick in NFL draft; signed by San Francisco 49ers |
| 5 | 34 | Larry Glueck | Defensive back | Villanova | 38th pick in NFL draft; signed by Chicago Bears |
| 6 | 42 | Pat Emerick | Linebacker | Western Michigan | 77th pick in NFL draft; signed by Grand Rapids Blazers (UFL) |
| 8 | 58 | Gene Heeter | Tight end | West Virginia | Traded to New York Jets |
| 9 | 66 | Steve Barnett | Tackle | Oregon | 20th pick in NFL draft; signed by Chicago Bears |
| 10 | 74 | Don Scott | Tackle | Tampa | |
| 11 | 82 | Bob Petrich | Defensive end | West Texas A&M | 82nd pick in NFL draft |
| 12 | 90 | Terry Baker | Quarterback | Oregon State | 1st pick in NFL draft; signed by Los Angeles Rams |
| 13 | 98 | Chuck Walton | Guard | Iowa State | 55th pick in NFL draft; signed by Detroit Lions |
| 14 | 106 | Frank Lasky | Tackle | Florida | 26th pick in NFL draft; signed by New York Giants |
| 14 | 107 | Hatch Rosdahl | Defensive end | Penn State | 46th pick in NFL draft; traded to Buffalo Bills |
| 14 | 109 | Jack Cvercko | Guard | Northwestern | 63rd pick in NFL draft |
| 15 | 114 | Mike Fracchia | Halfback | Alabama | 33rd pick in NFL draft |
| 16 | 122 | Gene Breen | Linebacker | Virginia Tech | 210th pick in NFL draft; signed by Green Bay Packers |
| 17 | 130 | Dick Drummond | Halfback | George Washington | 165th pick in NFL draft |
| 19 | 146 | Ernie Park | Guard | McMurry | 230th pick in NFL draft |
| 20 | 154 | Buddy Soefker | Linebacker | LSU | 239th pick in NFL draft |
| 21 | 162 | Dan Points | Tackle | Cincinnati | |
| 22 | 170 | Roger Gill | Wide receiver | Texas Tech | 158th pick in NFL draft; signed by Philadelphia Eagles |
| 23 | 178 | Paul Watters | Tackle | Miami | 173rd pick in NFL draft |
| 24 | 186 | Bill Frank | Tackle | Colorado | 244th pick in NFL draft; signed by British Columbia Lions |
| 25 | 194 | Jerry Mazzanti | Defensive end | Arkansas | 223rd pick in NFL draft; signed by Philadelphia Eagles |
| 26 | 202 | Ken Dill | Center | Mississippi | 124th pick in NFL draft |
| 27 | 210 | Harry Butsko | Linebacker | Maryland | 203rd pick in NFL draft; signed by Washington Redskins |
| 28 | 218 | Steve Berzansky | Fullback | West Virginia | 257th pick in NFL draft; signed by Charleston Rockets (UFL) |
| 29 | 226 | Herman Hamp | Halfback | Fresno State | 266th pick in NFL draft |
Made roster † Pro Football Hall of Fame * Made at least one AFL All-Star game or NFL Pro Bowl during career Played in the NFL in 1963

=== Departures and arrivals ===
San Diego lost a key staff member on January 19 when Davis signed with the Raiders in the dual role of head coach and general manager. He had served as the Chargers' offensive ends coach, but had also earned a reputation as a good recruiter of new talent, an important role in the ongoing bidding war with the NFL. Oakland had finished the previous season at a league-worst 1–13 but emerged as serious rivals to the Chargers in the AFL West during Davis's first season there.

Davis soon brought defensive back Claude "Hoot" Gibson to join him in Oakland, as part of an equalization draft aimed at helping the league's weakest teams. Gibson had intercepted 13 passes during two seasons in San Diego. Other players to exit included tackle Sherman Plunkett and defensive tackle Bill Hudson. The pair, who had featured in every game the previous year, were traded away for future draft picks. Ron Nery, who had accumulated 15 1/2 sacks during three seasons with the Chargers, was cut shortly before the regular season began.

After losing Jack Kemp to the Buffalo Bills the previous year, San Diego were looking for a veteran quarterback who could both lead the team and mentor second-year passer John Hadl. Running back Gerry McDougall, who joined the team from the CFL's Toronto Argonauts late in the 1962 season, informed Gillman that Tobin Rote, a 13-year veteran and former NFL champion (with the 1957 Lions) was contemplating retirement after three seasons with the Argonauts. The Bills had the territorial rights to sign Rote but had no need for another quarterback. Both the Chargers and the Denver Broncos expressed an interest in signing Rote; AFL Commissioner Joe Foss conducted a coin flip to decide which team would have the right to claim the player. San Diego won and gave Buffalo tackle Dick Hudson and two future draft picks in exchange for Rote's signing rights. The 35-year-old was soon signed, with Gillman describing him as "one of the finest quarterbacks in football." He started every game throughout the season.

San Diego also gained George Gross, a 16th-round pick in the 1962 draft who had stayed on at Auburn as a redshirt that year. In 1963, he started every game for the Chargers at defensive tackle. Another guard, Sam DeLuca, re-signed with the team after a one-year retirement; he played in every game while starting half of them. Dick Westmoreland, an undrafted defensive back from North Carolina A&T, was signed by Chargers scout Al LoCasale and made the team. He ended the 1963 season as the only rookie selected for the NEA All-AFL 1st team, and was a 2nd-team choice for the Associated Press, UPI and the New York Daily News.

== Personnel ==
=== Staff ===
1963 San Diego Chargers staff
| Front office: Owner – Barron Hilton; General manager – Sid Gillman; Director of personnel - Don Klosterman; Head coaches: Head coach – Sid Gillman; Offensive coaches: Offensive backfield coach – Hugh Taylor; Offensive line coach – Joe Madro | Defensive coaches: Defensive line coach – Walt Hackett; Defensive backfield coach – Chuck Noll; Strength and conditioning: Strength coach - Alvin Roy |

=== Roster ===
1963 San Diego Chargers roster
| Quarterbacks (QB): 18 Tobin Rote; 21 John Hadl; Running backs (RB): 20 Gerry McDougall; 22 Keith Lincoln; 23 Paul Lowe; 40 Bob Jackson; Wide receivers (WR): 19 Lance Alworth; 29 Jerry Robinson; 88 Don Norton; Tight ends (TE): 38 Jacque MacKinnon; 83 Dave Kocourek | Offensive linemen (OL): 52 Don Rogers C; 60 Sam DeLuca G; 61 Ernie Park T/G; 64 Pat Shea G; 74 Ron Mix T; 75 Ernie Wright T; 78 Walt Sweeney T/G; Defensive linemen (DL): 76 Henry Schmidt DT/DE; 77 Ernie Ladd DT; 79 George Gross DT; 85 Bob Petrich DE; 86 Earl Faison DE | Linebackers (LB): 50 Chuck Allen MLB; 55 Frank Buncom OLB; 56 Emil Karas OLB; 57 Bobby Lane OLB; 82 Robert Mitinger OLB; 84 Paul Maguire OLB/P; Defensive backs (DB): 25 Dick Westmoreland CB; 36 Dick Harris CB; 39 George Blair SS/K; 43 Gary Glick FS; 47 Bud Whitehead CB/FS; Special teams (ST) | Reserve: 24 Keith Kinderman RB (IR); 27 Charlie McNeil S (IR); 65 Sam Gruneisen G (IR); 89 Reggie Carolan TE (IR); 51 Wayne Frazier C (IR); Rookies in italics |

== Training camp ==
=== Rough Acres Ranch ===
For the previous two seasons, the Chargers had trained at the University of San Diego. Gillman, seeking both to instil both toughness and a sense of unity in his team, opted to switch to Rough Acres Ranch, located in Boulevard, an isolated town 66 miles (106 km) from San Diego. The ranch had only basic amenities and was overrun with insects and other wildlife, including bats, spiders and poisonous rattlesnakes. The players had to conduct two-a-days in temperatures close to 100 °F (38 °C), on sawdust that had been laid on the barren earth to approximate the consistency of grass. There was little to distract the players from their practice and little to do in the evenings but spend time together, either at the ranch itself or a small gas station 3 miles (4.8 km) down the road.

Opinion among the players was divided as to the efficacy of using the ranch. Team captain Ron Mix believed that the 1963 Chargers were successful in spite of, not because of, the experience. Others were more positive. Ernie Ladd described Rough Acres as a great training facility, noting the isolated location as a positive, while Lance Alworth stated the team had "one of the greatest years as a result of it. I still don't understand why more teams don't do that and why we didn't do it more often after that." The Chargers did not have the option to return to Rough Acres, as the owners brought a lawsuit worth over a million dollars against them, alleging both property damage and non-payment of rental fees.

=== Steroid usage ===
Gillman hired a strength coach, Alvin Roy, to work with the team during training camp. Roy was a proponent of weightlifting, at a time when that form of exercise was not regarded as beneficial to a pro footballer. Roy also instructed the players to take pink pills each day at dinnertime, which would help their bodies assimilate protein. These pills were Dianabol, the commercial name of Metandienone, an anabolic steroid. The Chargers were the first professional football team to prescribe steroids to their players. The use of steroids was permitted in professional football at the time; they would eventually be banned in 1983 by then-NFL commissioner Pete Rozelle.

At first, taking the pills was compulsory. When Dick Harris openly refused to do so, he was fined his $60 pay for the Chargers' opening exhibition game by Gillman. Others who were suspicious of the pills disposed of them subtly, hiding them under the table at meal times, or keeping them in their mouths until they had exited the dining room. Many players did accept the Dianabol without question, however. Rookie defensive back Westmoreland took the pills and soon noticed that he, in his words, "got bigger and stronger but didn't lose speed."

After five weeks of the compulsory program, tight end Dave Kocourek began to feel ill and went to his personal physician. When the physician learned that his patient was taking Dianabol, he showed him a list of side effects, including "liver damage, muscle damage, bone damage and testicle shrinkage". Kocourek took the list to Mix, who raised the issue with Gillman. The pills became voluntary after that, and the majority of the team completely stopped taking them, while others reduced their intake.

== Preseason ==
San Diego entered their 1963 preseason schedule having accumulated a perfect 12–0 record in exhibition games over the past three years. They suffered a setback in the opening minutes of their first match when their newly acquired starting quarterback Rote was knocked out of the game with a chest injury. Backup Hadl played well in relief, throwing touchdowns to Jacque MacKinnon and Alworth. Earlier, Paul Lowe had scored the Chargers' first two touchdowns with runs of 3 and 65 yards; the running back was playing for the first time since the broken arm he had sustained during the 1962 preseason. The Chargers followed this with their 14th consecutive preseason win, beating the Patriots for the first of four times that season. Hadl started the game, completing 14 of 26 passes for 269 yards, with touchdowns to Alworth and Don Norton, while running for a score himself. Lowe again ran for two touchdowns, Charlie McNeil scored on a 44-yard interception return, and San Diego found the end zone seven times in total in a 50–17 win.

The Chargers' string of preseason victories came to an end a week later when they lost in Denver. The Broncos jumped out to a 28–3 lead in the 3rd quarter before the Chargers closed the gap with three touchdown passes: Hadl threw two, either side of one from halfback Keith Lincoln. Hadl also threw a two-point conversion pass to Kocourek; that pulled the Chargers back within six points in the final quarter, but they got no closer.

Two strong defensive performances followed. Against the Oilers, they had five interceptions, recovered a fumble and made a successful goal line stand as Houston mustered only three points despite gaining 27 first downs to the Chargers' 9. Hadl threw two touchdowns, and Lowe scored for the fifth time in the preseason. Rote returned for the preseason finale but struggled and threw four interceptions. Raider quarterbacks were also intercepted four times, and Bob Jackson scored the game's only touchdown as the Chargers beat Oakland for the tenth time in ten meetings (exhibition and regular season combined).

1963 San Diego Chargers preseason schedule
| Week | Date | Opponent | Result | Record | Venue | Attendance |
|---|---|---|---|---|---|---|
| 1 | August 3 | Kansas City Chiefs | W 26–14 | 1–0 | Balboa Stadium | 25,862 |
| 2 | August 10 | Boston Patriots | W 50–17 | 2–0 | Balboa Stadium | 16,427 |
| 3 | August 17 | at Denver Broncos | L 25–31 | 2–1 | DU Stadium | 11,135 |
| 4 | August 22 | at Houston Oilers | W 21–3 | 3–1 | Jeppesen Stadium | 23,635 |
| 5 | August 31 | Oakland Raiders | W 13–3 | 4–1 | Balboa Stadium | 17,517 |

== Regular season ==
=== Summary ===
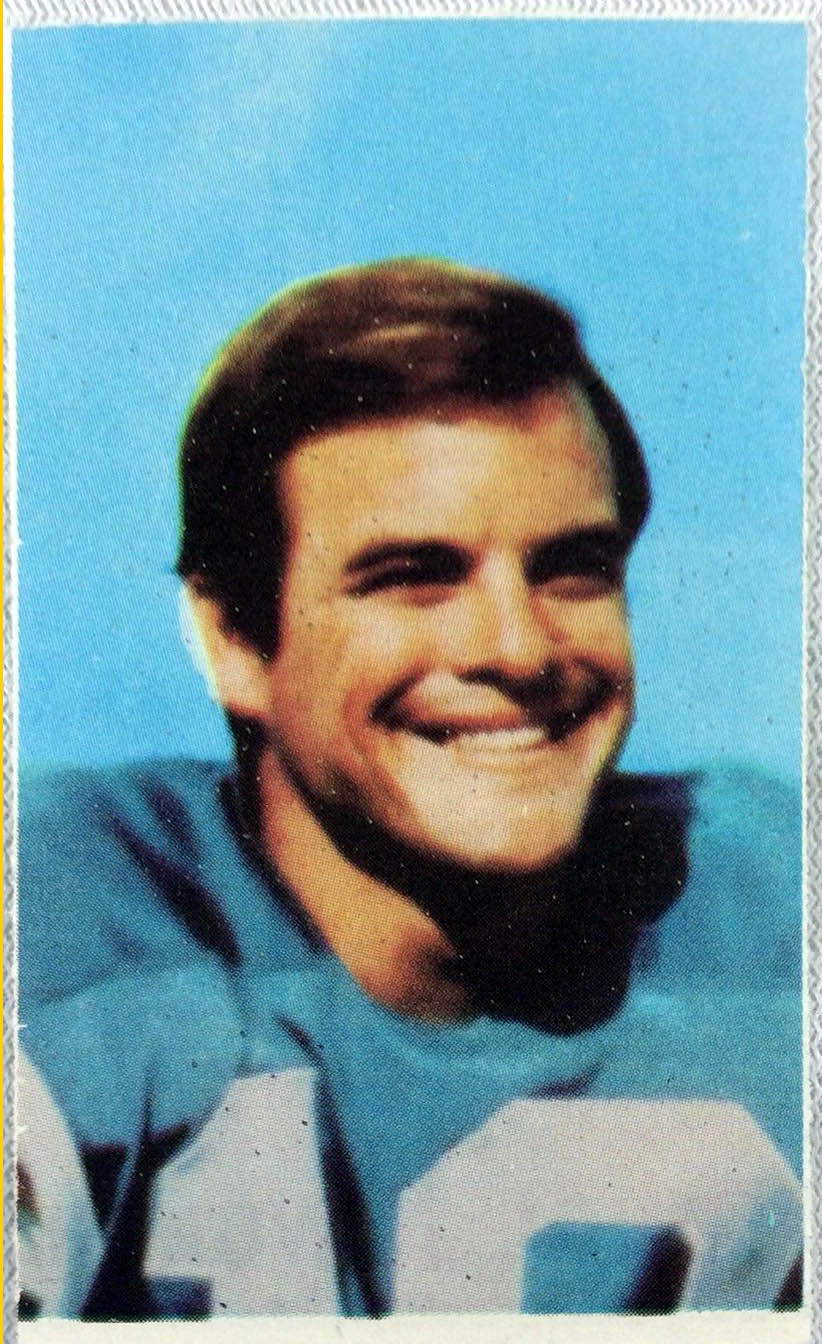
Lance Alworth was voted the AFL's Most Valuable Player by UPI.

Rote excelled at quarterback, winning the Associated Press AFL MVP award. His completion percentage of 59.4 was comfortably better than his nearest rival (Len Dawson with 54.0), while his passer rating of 86.7 was also an AFL best. He was also one of only three starting quarterbacks in the league to throw more touchdowns than interceptions (20 against 17). Gillman praised Rote's ability to call his own plays in the huddle, and Alworth later stated, "Tobin Rote's the reason why we won." Hadl also saw frequent action, as Gillman would frequently insert him into the game if Rote was struggling; Hadl threw at least one pass in 12 regular season games, complementing Rote's 2,510 yards with 502 of his own.

Alworth was the primary target for the two quarterbacks. The second-year flanker set new club receiving records for catches (61), yards (1,205) and touchdowns (11), ranking second in the league for the latter two categories; he also posted a pair of 200-yard games, the first in Charger history. Alworth was voted the league MVP by UPI. Of the other receivers, tight end Kocourek added 359 yards and five touchdowns. Norton, the club's leading receiver in 1962, was injured while lifting weights and missed the first seven games; he finished with 281 yards from limited action. Paul Lowe returned to the backfield after missing the entire 1962 season through injury. He formed a successful partnership with Lincoln, running behind a line anchored by unanimous 1st team All-AFL tackle Mix. Lowe rushed for 1,010 yards (2nd in the league), while Lincoln, who missed most of one game and all of another, finished with 826 yards (4th in the league). The pair combined for 18 touchdowns, contributing to San Diego's league-high tally of 399 points scored. The Chargers comfortably led the league in yards per pass and yards per rush (6.7 and 5.6 respectively - the Raiders were second in both categories with 5.3 and 4.5 respectively).

On defense, cornerback Harris led the team with eight interceptions (third most in the league), while linebacker Chuck Allen added five more. With All-Pro defensive end Earl Faison unofficially (Note: The NFL did not keep sack statistics officially until 1982. Members of the Professional Football Researchers Association have largely reconstructed sack data from 1960 onwards based on official gamebooks, but the NFL does not acknowledge pre-1982 sack numbers.) credited with a team-leading five sacks, the Charger defense was a balanced unit: they were the best in the league for touchdowns conceded against the pass (17) and joint-best against the run (10) while conceding the fewest points overall (255). George Blair did not repeat his excellent kicking performance from the previous season, but his stat line of 17 successes from 28 attempts still gave him the best percentage in the league. Paul Maguire averaged 38.6 yards per punt, the lowest of the league's eight punters.

=== Schedule ===
1963 San Diego Chargers regular season schedule
| Week | Date | Opponent | Result | Record | Venue | Attendance | Recap |
|---|---|---|---|---|---|---|---|
| 1 | September 8 | Buffalo Bills | **W** 14–10 | 1–0 | Balboa Stadium | 22,344 | Recap |
| 2 | September 14 | Boston Patriots | **W** 17–13 | 2–0 | Balboa Stadium | 26,097 | Recap |
| 3 | Bye | | | | | | |
| 4 | September 29 | **Kansas City Chiefs** | **W** 24–10 | 3–0 | Balboa Stadium | 22,654 | Recap |
| 5 | October 6 | at **Denver Broncos** | **L** 34–50 | 3–1 | Bears Stadium | 18,428 | Recap |
| 6 | October 13 | New York Jets | **W** 24–20 | 4–1 | Balboa Stadium | 27,189 | Recap |
| 7 | October 20 | at **Kansas City Chiefs** | **W** 38–17 | 5–1 | Municipal Stadium | 30,107 | Recap |
| 8 | October 27 | **Oakland Raiders** | **L** 33–34 | 5–2 | Balboa Stadium | 30,182 | Recap |
| 9 | November 2 | at New York Jets | **W** 53–7 | 6–2 | Polo Grounds | 18,336 | Recap |
| 10 | November 10 | at Boston Patriots | **W** 7–6 | 7–2 | Fenway Park | 28,402 | Recap |
| 11 | November 17 | at Buffalo Bills | **W** 23–13 | 8–2 | War Memorial Stadium | 38,592 | Recap |
| | Scheduled AFL games postponed to December 22 | | | | | | |
| 12 | December 1 | Houston Oilers | **W** 27–0 | 9–2 | Balboa Stadium | 31,713 | Recap |
| 13 | December 8 | at **Oakland Raiders** | **L** 27–41 | 9–3 | Frank Youell Field | 20,249 | Recap |
| 14 | December 15 | at Houston Oilers | **W** 20–14 | 10–3 | Jeppesen Stadium | 18,540 | Recap |
| 15 | December 22 | **Denver Broncos** | **W** 58–20 | 11–3 | Balboa Stadium | 31,312 | Recap |
Note: Intra-division opponents are in **bold** text.

=== Game summaries ===
==== Week 1: vs. Buffalo Bills ====
Week One: Buffalo Bills at San Diego Chargers – Game summary

| Quarter | 1 | 2 | 3 | 4 | Total |
|---|---|---|---|---|---|
| Bills | 0 | 3 | 0 | 7 | **10** |
| Chargers | 0 | 7 | 7 | 0 | **14** |

at Balboa Stadium, San Diego, California

- Date: September 8
- Game weather: 74 °F (23.3 °C), relative humidity 64%, wind 11 mph
- Game attendance: 22,344
- Box score

Game information

**First quarter**

- No scoring plays.

**Second quarter**

- SDG – Bobby Jackson 1-yard run (George Blair kick), 9:55. Chargers 7–0. **Drive: 6 plays, 52 yards.**
- BUF – Mack Yoho 17-yard field goal, 5:39. Chargers 7–3. **Drive: 9 plays, 62 yards.**

**Third quarter**

- SDG – Paul Lowe 48-yard run (George Blair kick), 1:33. Chargers 14–3. **Drive: 6 plays, 64 yards.**

**Fourth quarter**

- BUF – Fred Brown 4-yard run (Mack Yoho kick), 6:33. Chargers 14–10. **Drive: 11 plays, 90 yards.**

**Top passers**

- SDG – Tobin Rote – 18/29, 70 yards, INT
- BUF – Jack Kemp – 17/33, 220 yards, 3 INT

**Top rushers**

- SDG – Paul Lowe – 10 rushes, 96 yards, TD
- BUF – Wray Carlton – 10 rushes, 41 yards

**Top receivers**

- SDG – Dave Kocourek – 2 receptions, 60 yards
- BUF – Ernie Warlick – 3 receptions, 68 yards

San Diego opened the 1963 season with a victory, intercepting their former quarterback Jack Kemp three times. After an early Buffalo punt, Lincoln took a swing pass from Rote 32 yards down the right sideline, but Blair missed a short field goal soon afterwards. Bud Whitehead and Bob Mitinger intercepted Kemp on the next two Bills drives. After the second of these, Rote hit Kocourek for 31 yards over the middle, moving the ball to the Buffalo 1. Bobby Jackson scored the first Charger touchdown of the season on the next play, fighting through tacklers and narrowly crossing the goal line. Charger indiscipline aided Buffalo on their response, with three flags resulting from a single play: Ladd made a late hit on Kemp, Henry Schmidt was ejected for fighting, and Gillman was penalized for his protestations. These infractions moved the ball from San Diego's 44 to their 12, but the defense stiffened and restricted Buffalo to a field goal. Alworth's 27-yard reception opened the next drive, but Blair missed another field goal; after the Bills also missed a kick, it was 7–3 at halftime.

The Chargers were forced to punt at the start of the 3rd quarter, and Buffalo progressed to a 4th and 1 at the San Diego 40. The Bills went for the first down, but Ladd forced a fumble that McNeil recovered. Jerry Robinson wrestled a 41-yard pass from the grasp of a defender on the next play, but Jackson was eventually stuffed for no gain on 4th and 1 from the 2. Faison sacked Kemp to force a punt; six plays later, Paul Lowe cut upfield and wove through tacklers on his way to a 48-yard touchdown run. Paul Maguire's interception and 38-yard return gave the Chargers a chance to put the game away, starting only eight yards from the Buffalo end zone, but Rote was sacked and intercepted on consecutive plays. Buffalo then drove 90 yards in 11 plays, scoring with 6:33 left on the clock. The Bills declined a two-point conversion attempt, instead kicking an extra point to trail by four. Buffalo had two more possessions: the first ended in a punt after Petrich sacked Kemp; the second saw them reach their own 47 yard line before time expired.

Rote had a solid debut, going 18 of 29 for 260 yards, with one interception. Lowe, on his first game back after missing the entire 1962 season through injury, rushed 10 times for 96 yards and a touchdown.

==== Week 2: vs. Boston Patriots ====
Week Two: Boston Patriots at San Diego Chargers – Game summary

| Quarter | 1 | 2 | 3 | 4 | Total |
|---|---|---|---|---|---|
| Patriots | 3 | 7 | 0 | 3 | **13** |
| Chargers | 0 | 14 | 0 | 3 | **17** |

at Balboa Stadium, San Diego, California

- Date: September 14
- Game weather: 71 °F (21.7 °C), relative humidity 76%, wind 8 mph
- Game attendance: 26,097
- Box score

Game information

**First quarter**

- BOS – Gino Cappelletti 35-yard field goal, 2:06. Patriots 3–0. **Drive: 12 plays, 28 yards.**

**Second quarter**

- SDG – Lance Alworth 43-yard pass from Tobin Rote (George Blair kick), 12:13. Chargers 7–3.
- SDG – Jerry Robinson 71-yard pass from Paul Lowe (George Blair kick), 8:11. Chargers 14–3.
- BOS – Tom Yewcic 1-yard run (Gino Cappelletti kick), 2:55. Chargers 14–10. **Drive: 13 plays, 75 yards.**

**Third quarter**

- No scoring plays.

**Fourth quarter**

- BOS – Gino Cappelletti 36-yard field goal, 10:37. Chargers 14–13. **Drive: 7 plays, 51 yards.**
- SDG – George Blair 31-yard field goal, 7:50. Chargers 17–13. **Drive: 7 plays, 42 yards.**

**Top passers**

- BOS – Babe Parilli – 8/20, 74 yards, 2 INT
- SDG – Tobin Rote – 5/12, 97 yards, TD, INT

**Top rushers**

- BOS – Larry Garron – 19 rushes, 69 yards
- SDG – Keith Lincoln – 8 rushes, 39 yards

**Top receivers**

- BOS – Larry Garron – 5 receptions, 45 yards
- SDG – Jerry Robinson – 2 receptions, 83 yards, TD

This was the first night game played in San Diego. After a Patriots field goal opened the scoring, San Diego struck twice in the 2nd quarter. Lincoln's 47-yard punt return was immediately followed by Alworth's 43-yard touchdown reception; the Chargers then blocked a field goal, and fooled the Patriots defense when Lowe threw a 71-yard touchdown to Robinson. Boston pulled back seven points after a 13-play, 75-yard drive, and it was 14–10 at halftime.

Interceptions by McNeil and Maguire ended Patriot drives in the second half, and Alworth's 61-yard punt return gave the Chargers a chance to extend their lead, only for Blair to miss from 30 yards out early in the final quarter. Both kickers then had successful kicks, leaving the Chargers still up by four points entering the final minutes. Boston reached a 4th and 1 on the San Diego 40, but turned the ball over on downs after a botched handoff. Following a Charger punt, the Patriots had one final chance, but an incompletion on 4th and 4 from their own 48 let San Diego run the clock out.

The Chargers gained what would prove a season-low 240 yards on offense, nearly half the total coming on the two touchdown plays.

==== Week 4: vs. Kansas City Chiefs ====
Week Four: Kansas City Chiefs at San Diego Chargers – Game summary

| Quarter | 1 | 2 | 3 | 4 | Total |
|---|---|---|---|---|---|
| Chiefs | 0 | 3 | 0 | 7 | **10** |
| Chargers | 7 | 14 | 0 | 3 | **24** |

at Balboa Stadium, San Diego, California

- Date: September 29
- Game weather: 77 °F (25.0 °C), relative humidity 61%, wind 10 mph
- Game attendance: 22,654
- Box score

Game information

**First quarter**

- SDG – Dave Kocourek 19-yard pass from Tobin Rote (George Blair kick), 5:21. Chargers 7–0. **Drive: 2 plays, 25 yards.**

**Second quarter**

- SDG – Dave Kocourek 35-yard pass from Tobin Rote (George Blair kick), 13:24. Chargers 14–0. **Drive: 4 plays, 47 yards.**
- SDG – Keith Lincoln 15-yard pass from Tobin Rote (George Blair kick), 2:34. Chargers 21–0. **Drive: 11 plays, 91 yards.**
- KAN – Tommy Brooker 28-yard field goal, 0:10. Chargers 21–3. **Drive: 4 plays, 8 yards.**

**Third quarter**

- No scoring plays.

**Fourth quarter**

- SDG – George Blair 38-yard field goal, 7:23. Chargers 24–3. **Drive: 5 plays, 27 yards.**
- KAN – Fred Arbanas 2-yard pass from Len Dawson (Tommy Brooker kick), 1:35. Chargers 24–10. **Drive: 14 plays, 73 yards.**

**Top passers**

- KAN – Len Dawson – 18/34, 152 yards, TD, 3 INT
- SDG – Tobin Rote – 10/16, 127 yards, 3 TD, INT

**Top rushers**

- KAN – Curtis McClinton – 5 rushes, 11 yards
- SDG – Paul Lowe – 17 rushes, 91 yards

**Top receivers**

- KAN – Abner Haynes – 5 receptions, 49 yards
  KAN – Frank Jackson – 4 receptions, 49 yards
- SDG – Dave Kocourek – 3 receptions, 71 yards, 2 TD

Three early touchdown passes by Rote set the Chargers on their way to a comfortable win over the team who, while known as the Dallas Texans, had won the previous season's AFL Championship game. Faison's fumble recovery on the Kansas City 25 set up the first Rote touchdown, a 20-yard connection with Kocourek. In the 2nd quarter, McNeil intercepted Len Dawson, and the Chargers again capitalized, Kocourek jumping to gather in a Rote pass at the 10, and completing a 35-yard touchdown without breaking stride. The third touchdown drive was longer, covering 91 yards in 11 plays. Lowe broke off a 25-yard run, and Lincoln took a pass in the left flat before cutting inside to elude a tackler and complete a 15-yard touchdown. The Chiefs pulled three points back before the break, but Blair made one of two field goal attempts in the second half, and Kansas City didn't reach the end zone until the final two minutes of the match.

Rote finished 10 of 16 for 127 yards, three touchdowns and an interception. Lowe and Lincoln split the carries in the backfield, with Lowe rushing 17 times for 91 yards and Lincoln 14 times for 59 yards.

==== Week 5: at Denver Broncos ====
Week Five: San Diego Chargers at Denver Broncos – Game summary

| Quarter | 1 | 2 | 3 | 4 | Total |
|---|---|---|---|---|---|
| Chargers | 13 | 7 | 0 | 14 | **34** |
| Broncos | 3 | 14 | 9 | 24 | **50** |

at Bears Stadium, Denver, Colorado

- Date: October 6
- Game weather: 64 °F (17.8 °C), relative humidity 28%, wind 6 mph
- Game attendance: 18,428
- Box score

Game information

**First quarter**

- DEN – Gene Mingo 37-yard field goal, 5:17. Broncos 3–0. **Drive: 4 plays, 3 yards.**
- SDG – Keith Lincoln 39-yard pass from Tobin Rote (George Blair kick), 4:45. Chargers 7–3. **Drive: 3 plays, 61 yards.**
- SDG – Paul Lowe 31-yard pass from Tobin Rote (kick failed), 3:40. Chargers 13–3. **Drive: 1 play, 31 yards.**

**Second quarter**

- DEN – Gene Prebola 12-yard pass from John McCormick (Gene Mingo kick), 14:12. Chargers 13–10. **Drive: 8 plays, 79 yards.**
- SDG – Lance Alworth 85-yard pass from Tobin Rote (George Blair kick), 4:38. Chargers 20–10. **Drive: 2 plays, 80 yards.**
- DEN – Lionel Taylor 24-yard pass from John McCormick (Gene Mingo kick), 1:51. Chargers 20–17. **Drive: 7 plays, 62 yards.**

**Third quarter**

- DEN – Gene Mingo 41-yard field goal, 13:08. Tied 20–20. **Drive: 4 plays, 2 yards.**
- DEN – Gene Mingo 26-yard field goal, 9:18. Broncos 23–20. **Drive: 7 plays, 21 yards.**
- DEN – Gene Mingo 13-yard field goal, 1:08. Broncos 26–20. **Drive: 4 plays, 5 yards.**

**Fourth quarter**

- SDG – Keith Lincoln 19-yard pass from Tobin Rote (George Blair kick), 9:15. Chargers 27–26. **Drive: 3 plays, 45 yards.**
- DEN – Lionel Taylor 49-yard pass from John McCormick (Gene Mingo kick), 5:08. Broncos 33–27. **Drive: 6 plays, 70 yards.**
- DEN – Donnie Stone 39-yard run (Gene Mingo kick), 4:34. Broncos 40–27. **Drive: 3 plays, 34 yards.**
- DEN – Goose Gonsoulin 43-yard interception return (Gene Mingo kick), 4:05. Broncos 47–27.
- SDG – Jacque MacKinnon 54-yard pass from John Hadl (George Blair kick), 2:57. Broncos 47–34. **Drive: 4 plays, 63 yards.**
- DEN – Gene Mingo 21-yard field goal, 0:20. Broncos 50–34. **Drive: 8 plays, 48 yards.**

**Top passers**

- SDG – Tobin Rote – 11/17, 230 yards, 3 TD, 2 INT
- DEN – John McCormick – 18/36, 265 yards, 3 TD, INT

**Top rushers**

- SDG – Keith Lincoln – 8 rushes, 62 yards
- DEN – Donnie Stone – 17 rushes, 104 yards, TD

**Top receivers**

- SDG – Lance Alworth – 4 receptions, 114 yards, TD
- DEN – Lionel Taylor – 7 receptions, 142 yards, 2 TD

San Diego conceded 50 points in a game for the first time, as Denver scored three times in barely a minute in the final quarter. Lincoln's fumble set up Denver for the game's first points, a 37-yard field goal from Gene Mingo. Lincoln made amends only three plays later, taking a screen pass in for a 39-yard touchdown. McNeil's interception soon gave San Diego the ball back, and it was Lowe's turn to score, taking a Rote pass 31 yards on the next play. The Broncos responded with a 79-yard drive to a John McCormick touchdown pass, before Mingo missed kicks from 37 and 44 yards. Two plays after the second of these, Rote dropped back from his own 15 and found Alworth at midfield, the receiver completing an 85-yard touchdown. McCormick came back with another scoring throw, and Rote was intercepted shortly before halftime.

Denver's momentum continued into the 3rd quarter. After tying the scores at 20–20 with a Mingo field goal, they executed a surprise onside kick, and another Mingo success put them in front. Rote was intercepted and lost a fumble, with the latter turnover leading to a further field goal. Hadl came on for Rote in the 4th quarter, and threw a touchdown on his very first pass attempt, a 19-yarder to Lincoln. That put San Diego back on top, 27–26, but McCormick soon responded with his third touchdown pass of the game. Lincoln's eventful day was complete when he fumbled the ensuing kickoff, and Denver scored again. When Hadl threw an interception a few plays later, Goose Gonsoulin ran the ball back for another touchdown, and Denver had scored 21 points in the space of 63 seconds. Hadl threw a deflected 54-yard touchdown pass to MacKinnon, but Denver recovered Blair's onside kick attempt, and Mingo added his fifth field goal with 20 seconds to play.

Rote and Hadl threw for 317 yards and a new club-record five touchdowns between them. Alworth caught 4 passes for 114 yards and a touchdown, while Lincoln had 62 yards on the ground and 73 through the air, including two scores.

==== Week 6: vs. New York Jets ====
Week Six: New York Jets at San Diego Chargers – Game summary

| Quarter | 1 | 2 | 3 | 4 | Total |
|---|---|---|---|---|---|
| Jets | 7 | 3 | 10 | 0 | **20** |
| Chargers | 3 | 0 | 14 | 7 | **24** |

at Balboa Stadium, San Diego, California

- Date: October 13
- Game weather: 66 °F (18.9 °C), relative humidity 69%, wind 6 mph
- Game attendance: 27,189
- Box score

Game information

**First quarter**

- NYJ – Bake Turner 51-yard pass from Dick Wood (Dick Guesman kick), 11:15. Jets 7–0. **Drive: 1 play, 51 yards.**
- SDG – George Blair 28-yard field goal, 4:15. Jets 7–3. **Drive: 7 plays, 60 yards.**

**Second quarter**

- NYJ – Dick Guesman 44-yard field goal, 11:36. Jets 10–3. **Drive: 5 plays, 2 yards.**

**Third quarter**

- SDG – Dave Kocourek 8-yard pass from John Hadl (George Blair kick), 9:57. Tied 10–10. **Drive: 6 plays, 87 yards.**
- SDG – Lance Alworth 11-yard pass from Gerry McDougall (George Blair kick), 5:33. Chargers 17–10. **Drive: 8 plays, 79 yards.**
- NYJ – Dick Guesman 32-yard field goal, 4:16. Chargers 17–13. **Drive: 4 plays, -7 yards.**
- NYJ – Mark Smolinski 2-yard run (Dick Guesman kick), 0:44. Jets 20–17. **Drive: 5 plays, 80 yards.**

**Fourth quarter**

- SDG – Paul Lowe 7-yard run (George Blair kick), 9:06. Chargers 24–20. **Drive: 5 plays, 61 yards.**

**Top passers**

- NYJ – Dick Wood – 15/31, 220 yards, TD
- SDG – John Hadl – 8/12, 134 yards, TD

**Top rushers**

- NYJ – Mark Smolinski – 10 rushes, 26 yards, TD
  NYJ – Bill Mathis – 10 rushes, 26 yards
- SDG – Paul Lowe – 16 rushes, 161 yards, TD

**Top receivers**

- NYJ – Bake Turner – 3 receptions, 68 yards, TD
- SDG – Lance Alworth – 4 receptions, 54 yards, TD

San Diego bounced back with a hard-fought win over the Jets. After Lowe lost a fumble, former Chargers QB Dick Wood produced a touchdown pass on the Jets' first play from scrimmage, covering 51 yards. Lowe was then intercepted on a halfback pass, but New York missed a field goal on the resulting drive. Lowe bounced back with a 40-yard gain on a sweep, and Blair was successful from 28 yards out. Rote was later picked off, leading to a Jets field goal and a 10–3 scoreline at halftime.

Hadl entered the game in the third quarter for his most substantial playing time of the season. He made an immediate impact with run of 9 and 33 yards, before rounding out an 87-yard drive with an 8-yard touchdown to Kocourek, who leaped to make the catch with defenders on either side of him. The Chargers were in trouble at the start of their next drive, facing 3rd and 13 at their own 18 yard line, but Lincoln took a short pass and broke two tackles en route to a 37-yard gain. Five plays later, it was 2nd and 7 at the Jet 11, and San Diego again called a pass from an unexpected source. This time the trick play worked, fullback Gerry MacDougall lofting the ball to the back of the end zone where Alworth jumped to pull it in. Dick Christy returned the ensuing kickoff 71 yards to the Charger 18 before Westmoreland made a touchdown-saving tackle. That ultimately caused the Jets to settle for a field goal, as Hank Schmidt sacked Wood on third down. San Diego converted a 4th and 1 on the next drive, MacDougall's 26-yard catch moving the ball into field goal range, but the drive ended with a miss by Blair. New York then used a 54-yard pass interference penalty as the springboard for an 80-yard touchdown drive and a 20–17 lead as the 3rd quarter ended. Maguire pinned the Jets at their own 1 with a punt, and the defense forced a three-and-out, though an excellent punt in return set San Diego back on their own 39. Lowe accounted for most of the yardage on the next drive, with runs of 6 and 30 yards to start it off and a 7-yard touchdown up the middle to finish it with 9:06 to play. Wood led the Jets to the Charger 13, but his pass was deflected and incomplete on 4th and 8. New York's final chance ended on their own 40, when Frank Buncom knocked away another 4th down pass.

Rote was 10 of 13 for 78 yards and an interception, while Hadl was 8 of 12 for 134 yards and a touchdown. Lowe carried 16 times for 161 yards and one touchdown. San Diego's defense had zero takeaways. It was the first time in a regular season game that they failed to make at least one interception (they also had none in the 1960 AFL title game), ending a 46-game streak that remains an AFL/NFL record.

==== Week 7: at Kansas City Chiefs ====
Week Seven: San Diego Chargers at Kansas City Chiefs – Game summary

| Quarter | 1 | 2 | 3 | 4 | Total |
|---|---|---|---|---|---|
| Chargers | 0 | 3 | 14 | 21 | **38** |
| Chiefs | 0 | 7 | 3 | 7 | **17** |

at Municipal Stadium, Kansas City, Missouri

- Date: October 20
- Game weather: 73 °F (22.8 °C), relative humidity 56%, wind 7 mph
- Game attendance: 30,107
- Box score

Game information

**First quarter**

- No scoring plays.

**Second quarter**

- SDG – George Blair 29-yard field goal, 3:22. Chargers 3–0. **Drive: 4 plays, -9 yards.**
- KAN – Abner Haynes 73-yard pass from Len Dawson (Tommy Brooker kick), 2:09. Chiefs 7–3. **Drive: 2 plays, 75 yards.**

**Third quarter**

- SDG – Lance Alworth 44-yard pass from Tobin Rote (George Blair kick), 12:24. Chargers 10–7. **Drive: 6 plays, 70 yards.**
- KAN – Tommy Brooker 36-yard field goal, 10:06. Tied 10–10. **Drive: 5 plays, 31 yards.**
- SDG – Paul Lowe 7-yard run (George Blair kick), 3:37. Chargers 17–10. **Drive: 11 plays, 86 yards.**

**Fourth quarter**

- SDG – Lance Alworth 72-yard pass from Tobin Rote (George Blair kick), 7:32. Chargers 24–10. **Drive: 2 plays, 87 yards.**
- KAN – Fred Arbanas 7-yard pass from Len Dawson (Tommy Brooker kick), 5:24. Chargers 24–17. **Drive: 8 plays, 78 yards.**
- SDG – Keith Lincoln 76-yard run (George Blair kick), 5:01. Chargers 31–17. **Drive: 1 play, 76 yards.**
- SDG – Paul Lowe 21-yard run (George Blair kick), 3:03. Chargers 38–17. **Drive: 2 plays, 26 yards.**

**Top passers**

- SDG – Tobin Rote – 16/22, 266 yards, 2 TD
- KAN – Len Dawson – 16/24, 225 yards, 2 TD, 2 INT

**Top rushers**

- SDG – Keith Lincoln – 10 rushes, 127 yards, TD
- KAN – Curtis McClinton – 15 rushes, 60 yards

**Top receivers**

- SDG – Lance Alworth – 9 receptions, 232 yards, 2 TD
- KAN – Abner Haynes – 8 receptions, 149 yards, TD

Alworth had the most receiving yardage of any game in his Hall of Fame career, and the Chargers won on their first-ever trip to Kansas City. The first four San Diego possessions resulted in punts, before Allen intercepted Len Dawson, setting up Blair's field goal to open the scoring. However, Dawson found Abner Haynes with a deep pass over the middle only two plays after the kickoff; Haynes slipped McNeil's diving tackle and completed a 73-yard touchdown, and Kansas City led 7–3 at halftime.

Hadl had been in at quarterback on the final two Charger drives of the first half, but Rote returned after the break, and led his team to touchdowns on five of their first six-second half possessions. Rote was 5 for 5 on the first drive, finishing with a 44-yard pass to Alworth, who had got open behind the safeties. Following a Chiefs field goal, Alworth's 28-yard catch was the biggest gain on an 11-play, 86-yard drive, which Lowe finished by cutting up the middle for a 7-yard touchdown on 3rd and 5. Blair then recovered a fumble, but missed a 40-yard field goal five plays later. After that, Dawson led his team from their own 20 to a 4th and 5 at the Charger 13. With only eight minutes remaining, Kansas City opted to go for it, but Dawson's pass was incomplete. Lincoln's 15-yard run on the next play was immediately followed by another Alworth touchdown. The flanker got a step behind cornerback Duane Wood, giving him position to outwrestle Wood for the ball at the Chief 35 and complete a 72-yard touchdown. Dawson threw a touchdown on 4th and goal from the 7 on the next drive, and Kansas City were back within 24–17 with 5:24 still on the clock. Lincoln put the game away on the next play from scrimmage. Taking a pitchout to the left, he cut upfield and worked his way back towards the right sideline to avoid tacklers, ultimately outracing the defense and going in untouched for a 76-yard touchdown. Blair then made a juggling interception of Dawson, and Lowe shrugged off a tackler at the line of scrimmage before completing the scoring with a 21-yard run.

Rote was 16 of 22 for 266 yards, two touchdowns and no interceptions. Lincoln rushed 10 times for 127 yards and a touchdown. Alworth caught 9 passes for 232 yards and two touchdowns; he had 183 receiving yards in the second half alone.

==== Week 8: vs. Oakland Raiders ====
Week Eight: Oakland Raiders at San Diego Chargers – Game summary

| Quarter | 1 | 2 | 3 | 4 | Total |
|---|---|---|---|---|---|
| Raiders | 7 | 7 | 7 | 13 | **34** |
| Chargers | 10 | 7 | 9 | 7 | **33** |

at Balboa Stadium, San Diego, California

- Date: October 27
- Game weather: 68 °F (20.0 °C), relative humidity 65%, wind 6 mph
- Game attendance: 30,182
- Box score

Game information

**First quarter**

- OAK – Art Powell 20-yard pass from Tom Flores (Mike Mercer kick), 11:17. Raiders 7–0. **Drive: 3 plays, 25 yards.**
- SDG – George Blair 23-yard field goal, 7:51. Raiders 7–3. **Drive: 7 plays, 36 yards.**
- SDG – Lance Alworth 32-yard pass from Tobin Rote (George Blair kick), 4:41. Chargers 10–7. **Drive: 3 plays, 58 yards.**

**Second quarter**

- OAK – Alan Miller 5-yard pass from Tom Flores (Mike Mercer kick), 9:02. Raiders 14–10. **Drive: 7 plays, 30 yards.**
- SDG – Jacque MacKinnon 69-yard pass from John Hadl (George Blair kick), 7:35. Chargers 17–14. **Drive: 3 plays, 71 yards.**

**Third quarter**

- SDG – Dick Harris 23-yard interception return (kick blocked), 13:26. Chargers 23–14.
- OAK – Dobie Craig 39-yard pass from Cotton Davidson (Mike Mercer kick), 5:00. Chargers 23–21. **Drive: 2 plays, 39 yards.**
- SDG – George Blair 36-yard field goal, 2:30. Chargers 26–21. **Drive: 6 plays, 54 yards.**

**Fourth quarter**

- OAK – Art Powell 46-yard pass from Cotton Davidson (Mike Mercer kick), 14:51. Raiders 28–26. **Drive: 6 plays, 72 yards.**
- SDG – Keith Lincoln 51-yard run (George Blair kick), 11:21. Chargers 33–28. **Drive: 6 plays, 80 yards.**
- OAK – Glenn Shaw 9-yard pass from Cotton Davidson (run failed), 1:52. Raiders 34–33. **Drive: 7 plays, 63 yards.**

**Top passers**

- OAK – Cotton Davidson – 5/10, 115 yards, 3 TD, INT
- SDG – John Hadl – 2/6, 82 yards, TD, INT

**Top rushers**

- OAK – Clem Daniels – 19 rushes, 125 yards
- SDG – Keith Lincoln – 15 rushes, 130 yards, TD

**Top receivers**

- OAK – Art Powell – 3 receptions, 77 yards, 2 TD
- SDG – Jacque MacKinnon – 3 receptions, 111 yards, TD

Oakland pulled within one and a half games of San Diego, after an eventful game in which four quarterbacks combined for seven touchdowns and eight interceptions. Rote was intercepted on the game's first possession, and Tom Flores found Art Powell for the opening points. San Diego responded with a Blair field goal, before Alworth maintained his good form with a 32-yard touchdown catch. Rote threw interceptions to Fred Williamson on the next two Charger drives; after the first of these, Harris picked off Flores to win the ball straight back, but Flores took his second chance with a 30-yard drive and another touchdown pass. Hadl entered the game and hit MacKinnon for a 69-yard touchdown on only his second throw. Flores was then intercepted by McNeil, but Hadl was intercepted himself before the half ended with San Diego 17–14 up.

Rote returned for the 3rd quarter, while the Raiders went with backup Cotton Davidson, Flores having sustained a head injury. The latter switch seemed to have backfired when Davidson's first pass was intercepted and run back for a touchdown by Harris, but he came back with a touchdown pass two plays after Lincoln had fumbled while attempting a lateral. A 29-yard catch by MacKinnon got San Diego moving, and Blair put the Chargers ahead 26–21 after three quarters with a 36-yard kick. Davidson's second touchdown pass was also Powell's second touchdown catch - the 46-yard connection put Oakland ahead one play into the final quarter. San Diego responded through Lincoln, the running back going off tackle and breaking through for a 51-yard score. After a punt each, the Raiders went 63 yards for the winning score, another pass by Davidson. The Chargers managed to sack Davidson on the ensuing two-point attempt, leaving them needing only a field goal to win with 1:52 still remaining. Their final drive started from their own 27 and quickly went wrong. Rote threw incomplete before being sacked for an 18-yard loss; he then threw his fourth interception of the game, and Oakland ran out the clock.

Oakland's quarterbacks completed only eight passes between them, but five of those went for touchdowns. For the Chargers, Lincoln rushed 15 times for 130 yards and a touchdown, while MacKinnon caught 3 passes for 111 yards and a score.

==== Week 9: at New York Jets ====
Week Nine: San Diego Chargers at New York Jets – Game summary

| Quarter | 1 | 2 | 3 | 4 | Total |
|---|---|---|---|---|---|
| Chargers | 7 | 17 | 14 | 15 | **53** |
| Jets | 0 | 0 | 0 | 7 | **7** |

at Polo Grounds, New York, New York

- Date: November 2
- Game weather: 48 °F (8.9 °C), relative humidity 73%, wind 16 mph
- Game attendance: 18,336
- Box score

Game information

**First quarter**

- SDG – Paul Lowe 11-yard pass from Tobin Rote (George Blair kick), 3:49. Chargers 7–0. **Drive: 6 plays, 52 yards.**

**Second quarter**

- SDG – Dave Kocourek 14-yard pass from Tobin Rote (George Blair kick), 14:11. Chargers 14–0. **Drive: 5 plays, 43 yards.**
- SDG – Paul Lowe 11-yard run (George Blair kick), 10:14. Chargers 21–0. **Drive: 4 plays, 72 yards.**
- SDG – George Blair 18-yard field goal, 6:51. Chargers 24–0. **Drive: 5 plays, 14 yards.**

**Third quarter**

- SDG – Lance Alworth 28-yard pass from Tobin Rote (George Blair kick), 12:07. Chargers 31–0. **Drive: 5 plays, 73 yards.**
- SDG – Tobin Rote 1-yard run (George Blair kick), 0:14. Chargers 38–0. **Drive: 12 plays, 64 yards.**

**Fourth quarter**

- SDG – Gerry McDougall 3-yard run (George Blair kick), 6:58. Chargers 45–0. **Drive: 8 plays, 81 yards.**
- NYJ – Dick Wood 4-yard run (Dick Guesman kick), 0:56. Chargers 45–7. **Drive: 15 plays, 69 yards.**
- SDG – Jerry Robinson 8-yard pass from John Hadl (Dave Kocourek pass from John Hadl), 0:00. Chargers 53–7. **Drive: 5 plays, 55 yards.**

**Top passers**

- SDG – Tobin Rote – 21/29, 369 yards, 3 TD
- NYJ – Dick Wood – 15/30, 173 yards, INT

**Top rushers**

- SDG – Paul Lowe – 16 rushes, 79 yards, TD
- NYJ – Mark Smolinski – 8 rushes, 29 yards

**Top receivers**

- SDG – Lance Alworth – 5 receptions, 180 yards, TD
- NYJ – Bake Turner – 5 receptions, 70 yards

The Chargers kicked off a three-game trip to the east coast by thrashing the Jets. On their second play from scrimmage, Alworth hauled in a deep pass and gained 62 yards, though a Lincoln fumble prevented San Diego from capitalising with any points. They made no mistake on their next possession, Lowe easily scoring on an 11-yard screen pass. Gross caused Dick Wood to fumble shortly afterwards, with Emil Karas recovering - five plays later, Kocourek scored from 14 yards out. Another turnover soon followed, Harris intercepting an underthrow by Wood. Alworth made a leaping grab on the next play, covering 49 yards; three plays later, Lowe swept right from the 11 behind strong blocking and went in untouched for a 21–0 lead, and Blair added a short field goal before halftime.

More points followed in the second half. Alworth again outjumped his marker on a 28-yard touchdown reception, Rote and MacDougall scored on short runs up the middle, and, after the Jets averted a shutout, Hadl threw an 8-yard touchdown to Robinson with no time on the clock. The Chargers faked a conversion kick after this final score, and Hadl hit Kocourek for two more points.

Rote completed 21 of 29 passes for a club-record 369 yards, with three touchdowns and no interceptions. His passer rating of 149.0 would be the best any Charger achieved in the AFL while making at least 20 attempts in a game. Alworth caught 5 passes for 180 yards and a touchdown. Harris had two interceptions and a fumble recovery, while Karas had two fumble recoveries. San Diego set club records for most points (this would be broken six games later), and margin of victory (still to be surpassed). The game featured three ejections, including two for the Chargers; Ladd and Joe Schmidt were both thrown out for their role in a fist fight.

==== Week 10: at Boston Patriots ====
Week Ten: San Diego Chargers at Boston Patriots – Game summary

| Quarter | 1 | 2 | 3 | 4 | Total |
|---|---|---|---|---|---|
| Chargers | 7 | 0 | 0 | 0 | **7** |
| Patriots | 0 | 0 | 6 | 0 | **6** |

at Fenway Park, Boston, Massachusetts

- Date: November 10
- Game weather: 45 °F (7.2 °C), relative humidity 83%, wind 15 mph
- Game attendance: 28,402
- Box score

Game information

**First quarter**

- SDG – Lance Alworth 27-yard pass from Tobin Rote (George Blair kick), 0:00. Chargers 7–0. **Drive: 8 plays, 64 yards.**

**Second quarter**

- No scoring plays.

**Third quarter**

- BOS – Gino Cappelletti 35-yard field goal, 12:39. Chargers 7–3. **Drive: 6 plays, 37 yards.**
- BOS – Gino Cappelletti 25-yard field goal, 1:36. Chargers 7–6. **Drive: 10 plays, 62 yards.**

**Fourth quarter**

- No scoring plays.

**Top passers**

- SDG – Tobin Rote – 17/29, 252 yards, TD, INT
- BOS – Babe Parilli – 14/30, 194 yards, 2 INT

**Top rushers**

- SDG – Keith Lincoln – 11 rushes, 36 yards
- BOS – Larry Garron – 23 rushes, 91 yards

**Top receivers**

- SDG – Lance Alworth – 13 receptions, 210 yards, TD
- BOS – Art Graham – 3 receptions, 64 yards

Alworth and the defense lifted San Diego to a narrow victory in the rain and mud of Fenway Park. Alworth had catches of 6, 37 and 17 yards on three consecutive plays in the game's opening drive, but Blair missed a 12-yard chip shot field goal, and the Chargers came up empty-handed. Westmoreland's fumble recovery then stopped a dangerous Patriot drive, and San Diego worked their way to the Boston 18, from where Alworth caught Rote's pass in the end zone and appeared to have opened the scoring. A penalty wiped those points off the board, but Rote went straight back to Alworth with a screen, good for 23 yards and a touchdown. Boston looked the more threatening team throughout the 2nd quarter, but Gino Cappelletti missed a 38-yard kick and lost a fumble that Gary Glick recovered. Allen outwrestled the intended receiver for an interception of Babe Parilli, and it was still 7–0 at the break.

Cappelletti made a 36-yard field goal early in the second half. Rote converted a 4th and 1 with a quarterback sneak on the next possession, but the drive ended when Blair missed from 48 yards. Boston drove into field goal range once more, and when Cappelletti was good from 25 yards, the lead was cut to a single point. Following a Rote interception, Cappelletti had a chance to put his team ahead, but was short from 37 yards out. Allen continued to make significant plays as the final quarter wore on, stopping Patriot drives with an interception and a fumble recovery. Boston's last chance came after Lowe lost a fumble at his own 42. The Charger defense knocked the Patriots back six yards on three running plays, and Cappelletti's final kick fell well short from 55 yards. Alworth's 50-yard reception helped San Diego run the clock out.

Alworth had 13 of his team's 18 pass receptions and gained 210 of their 271 total yards on offense while scoring the game's only touchdown. His 13 receptions were a new club record and would remain his career high. San Diego's total of 7 points remained the fewest they had scored in a victory until another meeting with the Patriots 60 years later.

==== Week 11: at Buffalo Bills ====
Week Eleven: San Diego Chargers at Buffalo Bills – Game summary

| Quarter | 1 | 2 | 3 | 4 | Total |
|---|---|---|---|---|---|
| Chargers | 10 | 0 | 7 | 6 | **23** |
| Bills | 7 | 3 | 3 | 0 | **13** |

at War Memorial Stadium, Buffalo, New York

- Date: November 17
- Game weather: 53 °F (11.7 °C), relative humidity 58%, wind 16 mph
- Game attendance: 38,592
- Box score

Game information

**First quarter**

- BUF – Cookie Gilchrist 1-yard run (Mack Yoho kick), 10:58. Bills 7–0. **Drive: 6 plays, 75 yards.**
- SDG – Keith Lincoln 46-yard run (George Blair kick), 8:53. Tied 7–7. **Drive: 3 plays, 76 yards.**
- SDG – George Blair 39-yard field goal, 1:55. Chargers 10–7. **Drive: 7 plays, 47 yards.**

**Second quarter**

- BUF – Mack Yoho 27-yard field goal, 2:48. Tied 10–10. **Drive: 8 plays, 36 yards.**

**Third quarter**

- SDG – Lance Alworth 17-yard pass from Tobin Rote (George Blair kick), 9:09. Chargers 17–10. **Drive: 4 plays, 20 yards.**
- BUF – Mack Yoho 9-yard field goal, 5:23. Chargers 17–13. **Drive: 7 plays, 69 yards.**

**Fourth quarter**

- SDG – George Blair 15-yard field goal, 9:12. Chargers 20–13. **Drive: 5 plays, 62 yards.**
- SDG – George Blair 41-yard field goal, 1:37. Chargers 23–13. **Drive: 9 plays, 46 yards.**

**Top passers**

- BUF – Jack Kemp – 23/36, 278 yards, 3 INT
- SDG – Tobin Rote – 10/22, 156 yards, TD, 2 INT

**Top rushers**

- BUF – Cookie Gilchrist – 17 rushes, 95 yards, TD
- SDG – Keith Lincoln – 10 rushes, 101 yards, TD

**Top receivers**

- BUF – Elbert Dubenion – 6 receptions, 112 yards
- SDG – Lance Alworth – 4 receptions, 79 yards, TD

San Diego completed a three-game east coast sweep with a hard-fought win in Buffalo. The Bills took the opening kickoff and drove 75 yards for Cookie Gilchrist to score from a yard out. The Chargers responded quickly, Lowe's 23-yard gain on a draw being immediately followed by Lincoln's 54-yard scoring trap run through the middle. The next time San Diego had the ball, Lincoln opened the drive with a 24-yard reception, and Blair finished it with a 39-yard field goal. Jack Kemp led his offense inside the Charger 10 late in the first half, but Maguire's third down sack had the Bills settling for a field goal and a 10–10 tie at the intermission.

In the 3rd quarter, Sweeney blocked a punt by Daryle Lamonica, and San Diego took over at the Buffalo 20. Lincoln appeared to have scored on a 9-yard run a few plays later, but Mix was penalized for a push. The Chargers scored anyway, Alworth gathering Rote's pass under the posts. Buffalo almost tied the game on their next drive, but last defender Westmoreland pulled Elbert Dubenion down at the Charger 5 yard line after a gain of 34, and the defense held Buffalo to a field goal. Lowe's 27-yard run had the Chargers threatening on their next drive, but they were thwarted when Rote was intercepted. Harris intercepted Kemp on the next two Buffalo drives; after the second of these, Rote's 54-yard completion to Alworth set up a short Blair field goal. After forcing a punt, the Chargers drove from their own 20 to Buffalo's 34, and Blair hit the clinching kick from 41 yards out with 1:37 to play.

Harris added a third interception on the game's final play, his seventh in a four-game span. Lincoln rushed 10 times for 101 yards and a touchdown, while adding 31 yards on 3 receptions. With Oakland idle, the Chargers stretched their lead in the AFL West to two full games. The attendance figure set a new AFL record.

==== Week 12: vs. Houston Oilers ====
Week Twelve: Houston Oilers at San Diego Chargers – Game summary

| Quarter | 1 | 2 | 3 | 4 | Total |
|---|---|---|---|---|---|
| Oilers | 0 | 0 | 0 | 0 | **0** |
| Chargers | 7 | 13 | 0 | 7 | **27** |

at Balboa Stadium, San Diego, California

- Date: December 1
- Game weather: 60 °F (15.6 °C), relative humidity 63%, wind 5 mph
- Game attendance: 31,713
- Box score

Game information

**First quarter**

- SDG – Keith Lincoln 15-yard run (George Blair kick), 4:30. Chargers 7–0. **Drive: 5 plays, 54 yards.**

**Second quarter**

- SDG – George Blair 42-yard field goal, 9:16. Chargers 10–0. **Drive: 9 plays, 37 yards.**
- SDG – Paul Lowe 2-yard run (George Blair kick), 6:18. Chargers 17–0. **Drive: 8 plays, 65 yards.**
- SDG – George Blair 20-yard field goal, 0:14. Chargers 20–0. **Drive: 5 plays, 41 yards.**

**Third quarter**

- No scoring plays.

**Fourth quarter**

- SDG – Lance Alworth 22-yard pass from Tobin Rote (George Blair kick), 11:09. Chargers 27–0. **Drive: 11 plays, 80 yards.**

**Top passers**

- HOU – George Blanda – 9/26, 110 yards, 2 INT
- SDG – Tobin Rote – 13/24, 134 yards, TD, 2 INT

**Top rushers**

- HOU – Charley Tolar – 13 rushes, 74 yards
- SDG – Keith Lincoln – 13 rushes, 102 yards, TD

**Top receivers**

- HOU – Willard Dewveall – 5 receptions, 62 yards
- SDG – Lance Alworth – 4 receptions, 56 yards, TD

In a matchup of division leaders, San Diego shut out the Oilers. Houston had the game's first scoring chance, but Maguire blocked George Blanda's 48-yard field goal attempt. Lincoln opened the scoring only five plays later, taking a draw up the middle from 15 yards out. Houston fumbled away a red zone chance on their next drive, and the Chargers soon pulled away. A Lincoln run set up Blair's 42-yard field goal, and Maguire recovered a fumble on the ensuing kickoff. After three straight incompletions, San Diego faked a field goal, Rote passing to Kocourek in the left flat, from where the tight end fought his way for 14 yards and a first down. Four plays later, Kocourek drew pass interference on a 3rd and 13 play, and Lowe went in from the 2. A Karas interception and 30-yard return was then wasted as Rote, too, was intercepted. Late in the half, Houston failed on a fourth down conversion attempt, and San Diego had three big runs in a row (Lowe 14 yards, Lincoln 16 yards, Lincoln 13 yards), setting up Blair's second field goal.

Mitinger's interception two plays into the second half maintained the Chargers' dominance. They later put together an 11-play, 80-yard drive that bridged the 3rd and 4th quarters and ended with Alworth's 22-yard catch from Rote. Houston's threatened to avoid the shutout on their last two possessions, but backup quarterback Jacky Lee was sacked on 4th down, and later intercepted by Glick.

Westmoreland was credited with 15 solo tackles and 1 assist, plus 6 passes defensed. Lincoln (13 carries for 102 yards and a touchdown, 1 reception for 5 yards) and Lowe (21 carries for 80 yards and a touchdown, 3 receptions for 25 yards) provided two strong performances in the backfield.

==== Week 13: at Oakland Raiders ====
Week Thirteen: San Diego Chargers at Oakland Raiders – Game summary

| Quarter | 1 | 2 | 3 | 4 | Total |
|---|---|---|---|---|---|
| Chargers | 7 | 13 | 7 | 0 | **27** |
| Raiders | 3 | 7 | 0 | 31 | **41** |

at Frank Youell Field, Oakland, California

- Date: December 8
- Game weather: 48 °F (8.9 °C), relative humidity 66%, wind 6 mph
- Game attendance: 20,249
- Box score

Game information

**First quarter**

- SDG – Don Norton 32-yard pass from Tobin Rote (George Blair kick), 13:07. Chargers 7–0. **Drive: 4 plays, 60 yards.**
- OAK – Mike Mercer 37-yard field goal, 5:09. Chargers 7–3. **Drive: 8 plays, 30 yards.**

**Second quarter**

- SDG – Bobby Jackson 14-yard run (George Blair kick), 10:55. Chargers 14–3. **Drive: 6 plays, 89 yards.**
- OAK – Art Powell 45-yard pass from Tom Flores (Mike Mercer kick), 6:06. Chargers 14–10. **Drive: 6 plays, 70 yards.**
- SDG – Jacque MacKinnon 5-yard pass from Tobin Rote (kick failed), 0:42. Chargers 20–10. **Drive: 5 plays, 61 yards.**

**Third quarter**

- SDG – Lance Alworth 15-yard pass from Tobin Rote (George Blair kick), 1:57. Chargers 27–10. **Drive: 6 plays, 75 yards.**

**Fourth quarter**

- OAK – Art Powell 10-yard pass from Cotton Davidson (Mike Mercer kick), 12:48. Chargers 27–17. **Drive: 4 plays, 39 yards.**
- OAK – Mike Mercer 30-yard field goal, 11:36. Chargers 27–20. **Drive: 4 plays, 0 yards.**
- OAK – Cotton Davidson 9-yard run (Mike Mercer kick), 7:54. Tied 27–27. **Drive: 6 plays, 43 yards.**
- OAK – Art Powell 40-yard pass from Cotton Davidson (Mike Mercer kick), 5:35. Raiders 34–27. **Drive: 3 plays, 39 yards.**
- OAK – Alan Miller 2-yard run (Mike Mercer kick), 1:06. Raiders 41–27. **Drive: 6 plays, 12 yards.**

**Top passers**

- SDG – Tobin Rote – 17/25, 284 yards, 3 TD, INT
- OAK – Tom Flores – 11/23, 173 yards, TD

**Top rushers**

- SDG – Bobby Jackson – 5 rushes, 33 yards, TD
- OAK – Clem Daniels – 17 rushes, 90 yards

**Top receivers**

- SDG – Don Norton – 6 receptions, 119 yards, TD
- OAK – Art Powell – 6 receptions, 132 yards, 3 TD

Up by two games over the Raiders with only three to play, the Chargers could end the AFL West race with a win, but a collapse in the 4th quarter cost them the chance to clinch their division. They began the game with a successful opening drive. Lincoln had a 36-yard reception and, after the Chargers lost six yards on the next two plays, Rote threw a deep pass to Norton for a 32-yard touchdown. For Norton, who had missed seven games through a back injury, it was his only touchdown of the regular season.

After a Raider field goal, San Diego suffered a setback when Lincoln was knocked out of the game through injury, with Bobby Jackson taking his place in the backfield. The switch appeared not to have disrupted the offense during a 6-play, 89-yard drive that opened with Alworth's 54-yard reception and ended with Jackson going 14 yards off-tackle to the end zone. Oakland responded with a 44-yard touchdown pass from Tom Flores to Art Powell on 4th and 2, but failed to convert on 4th and 10 from the Charger 39 on their next drive. Norton then had 22- and 36-yard receptions, and MacKinnon's short catch made it 20–10 at halftime.

Cotton Davidson, who had played a major role in the Raiders' victory in San Diego earlier in the season, was brought on for the second half. The switch had no immediate impact, with the only score of the 3rd quarter going to the Chargers - Kocourek's 40-yard reception paving the way for Alworth's 15-yard touchdown. When the Raiders went three-and-out in response, San Diego took over on their own 20 early in the final quarter, 17 points ahead. Lowe appeared to have gained 38 yards on first down, but the run was nullified by penalty. Jackson took a screen pass to the Chargers 39 on the next play, but fumbled and Oakland recovered. Davidson's touchdown to Powell began the comeback four plays later. Next, Lowe lost a fumble and Oakland capitalized with a field goal. Following a Charger punt, Davidson led his team 57 yards and scored the game-tying touchdown himself with 7:54 to play.

San Diego were unable to respond, failing to pick up a first down and punting again. Three plays later, Powell was in the end zone once more, with a 41-yard touchdown. Lowe returned the ensuing kickoff 41 yards, and Hadl came out to try and spark the offense. He found Norton for an 18-yard gain to the Oakland 38, but followed that with three incompletions and an interception. The Raiders added a further touchdown in the final minutes, and pulled to within a game at the top of the division.

Rote was 17 of 25 for 284 yards, three touchdowns and no interceptions, while Norton caught six passes for 119 yards and a touchdown. Art Powell scored 5 touchdowns from only 9 catches over the two games with San Diego. It was only the third time in AFL/NFL history that a team was outscored by 30+ points in the 4th quarter.

==== Week 14: at Houston Oilers ====
Week Fourteen: San Diego Chargers at Houston Oilers – Game summary

| Quarter | 1 | 2 | 3 | 4 | Total |
|---|---|---|---|---|---|
| Chargers | 0 | 17 | 3 | 0 | **20** |
| Oilers | 0 | 7 | 0 | 7 | **14** |

at Jeppesen Stadium, Houston, Texas

- Date: December 15
- Game weather: 38 °F (3.3 °C), relative humidity 53%, wind 10 mph, wind chill 31
- Game attendance: 18,540
- Box score

Game information

**First quarter**

- No scoring plays.

**Second quarter**

- SDG – Tobin Rote 1-yard run (George Blair kick), 12:10. Chargers 7–0. **Drive: 3 plays, 61 yards.**
- SDG – Bobby Jackson 1-yard run (George Blair kick), 6:36. Chargers 14–0. **Drive: 6 plays, 30 yards.**
- HOU – Willard Dewveall 24-yard pass from George Blanda (George Blanda kick), 5:20. Chargers 14–7. **Drive: 2 plays, 51 yards.**
- SDG – George Blair 22-yard field goal, 1:20. Chargers 17–7. **Drive: 6 plays, 10 yards.**

**Third quarter**

- SDG – George Blair 10-yard field goal, 2:45. Chargers 20–7. **Drive: 9 plays, 27 yards.**

**Fourth quarter**

- HOU – Bo Dickinson 1-yard run (George Blanda kick), 6:30. Chargers 20–14. **Drive: 8 plays, 64 yards.**

**Top passers**

- SDG – Tobin Rote – 9/17, 81 yards, INT
- HOU – George Blanda – 17/32, 247 yards, TD, 2 INT

**Top rushers**

- SDG – Paul Lowe – 19 rushes, 96 yards
- HOU – Charley Tolar – 5 rushes, 24 yards

**Top receivers**

- SDG – Lance Alworth – 3 receptions, 28 yards
- HOU – Charley Hennigan – 2 receptions, 95 yards

The stakes were high for both teams - San Diego were looking to maintain their one-game lead over Oakland, while Houston would be eliminated from the AFL East race with a loss. San Diego had the first drive that crossed into opposition territory, but Lowe lost a fumble - Houston then drove into field goal range, but George Blanda was wide right. In the 2nd quarter, three interceptions by Charger linebackers led to points. Firstly, Karas intercepted a Jacky Lee pass; Lowe immediately broke off a 59-yard run, and Rote sneaked into the end zone two plays later. Next, Allen picked off a Blanda pass at the Houston 30, and Jackson scored from close range six plays later. Blanda came straight back with a touchdown pass to Willard Dewveall, and Rote's deep pass was intercepted on the next play. Maguire then took back the momentum with an interception of his own, at the Houston 24-yard line. Blair capitalized with a 22-yard field goal, and it was 17–7 at halftime.

Blair missed wide left from 43 yards in the 3rd quarter, but Allen's fumble recovery at the Oiler 30 soon gave him another chance, and he converted a chip shot 10-yarder. The Oilers' next drive saw them reach 4th and goal at the 9. They elected to go for the touchdown, but Allen and Glick combined to stop Dewveall one yard short. San Diego gained one first down before being forced to punt, and Blanda converted a 3rd and 28 with a 68-yard completion. The Oilers made no mistake this time, finding the end zone with 6:30 to play in the game. The next three drives were three-and-outs. Houston's final drive started on their own 21-yard line with under two minutes to play. Blanda managed to converted a 4th and 1, but found progress to be slow going. The game's final snap was from the Charger 44 - Houston gained only 9 yards, and time expired.

Houston had four turnovers on the day, each of which San Diego converted into points. With Lincoln missing due to injury, Gerry MacDougall rushed 15 times for 56 yards, a complement to Lowe's 19 carries for 96 yards. These gains, plus the four crucial turnovers, were enough to compensate for a weak pass attack that managed only 85 yards total. Oakland also won, leaving the Raiders still one game back and able to force a playoff for the division crown if San Diego lost in Week 15.

==== Week 15: vs. Denver Broncos ====
Week Fifteen: Denver Broncos at San Diego Chargers – Game summary

| Quarter | 1 | 2 | 3 | 4 | Total |
|---|---|---|---|---|---|
| Broncos | 7 | 10 | 3 | 0 | **20** |
| Chargers | 10 | 16 | 10 | 22 | **58** |

at Balboa Stadium, San Diego, California

- Date: December 22
- Game weather: 56 °F (13.3 °C), relative humidity 53%, wind 5 mph
- Game attendance: 31,312
- Box score

Game information

**First quarter**

- SDG – Paul Lowe 10-yard run (George Blair kick), 13:11. Chargers 7–0. **Drive: 2 plays, 14 yards.**
- DEN – Billy Joe 1-yard run (Gene Mingo kick), 7:30. Tied 7–7. **Drive: 10 plays, 68 yards.**
- SDG – George Blair 17-yard field goal, 4:06. Chargers 10–7. **Drive: 6 plays, 68 yards.**

**Second quarter**

- SDG – Bobby Jackson 2-yard run (George Blair kick), 14:57. Chargers 17–7. **Drive: 4 plays, 33 yards.**
- DEN – Donnie Stone 10-yard pass from Don Breaux (Gene Mingo kick), 10:39. Chargers 17–14. **Drive: 7 plays, 69 yards.**
- SDG – Dave Kocourek 26-yard pass from Tobin Rote (kick blocked), 7:23. Chargers 23–14. **Drive: 8 plays, 69 yards.**
- DEN – Gene Mingo 12-yard field goal, 1:04. Chargers 23–17. **Drive: 4 plays, 5 yards.**
- SDG – George Blair 28-yard field goal, 0:25. Chargers 26–17. **Drive: 3 plays, 36 yards.**

**Third quarter**

- SDG – Paul Lowe 66-yard run (George Blair kick), 10:03. Chargers 33–17. **Drive: 3 plays, 66 yards.**
- DEN – Gene Mingo 15-yard field goal, 5:44. Chargers 33–20. **Drive: 11 plays, 57 yards.**
- SDG – George Blair 13-yard field goal, 0:49. Chargers 36–20. **Drive: 4 plays, 3 yards.**

**Fourth quarter**

- SDG – Keith Lincoln 29-yard run (George Blair kick), 14:24. Chargers 43–20. **Drive: 1 play, 29 yards.**
- SDG – Chuck Allen 42-yard fumble return (George Blair kick), 13:31. Chargers 50–20.
- SDG – Jacque MacKinnon 6-yard pass from John Hadl (Earl Faison pass from Tobin Rote), 0:06. Chargers 58–20. **Drive: 8 plays, 69 yards.**

**Top passers**

- DEN – Don Breaux – 16/31, 192 yards, TD, 2 INT
- SDG – Tobin Rote – 7/17, 109 yards, TD, INT

**Top rushers**

- DEN – Gene Mingo – 6 rushes, 30 yards
- SDG – Paul Lowe – 17 rushes, 183 yards, 2 TD

**Top receivers**

- DEN – Lionel Taylor – 5 receptions, 79 yards
- SDG – Don Norton – 3 receptions, 48 yards

San Diego clinched their third AFL West title in four seasons while setting a club record for points that still stands. Gross gave his team an excellent start, recovering a Broncos fumble forced by Karas. Lowe ran in the opening touchdown two plays later. After Denver answered with a touchdown on the ensuing drive, Alworth drew a 39-yard pass interference penalty and Blair kicked a field goal to put San Diego back in front. On the next drive, Mitinger made a one-handed interception after twice bobbling the ball. Norton's 29-yard reception on the following play set up Jackson's 2-yard touchdown dive. Denver again responded to a Charger touchdown with one of their own, a Don Breaux pass reducing their deficit to 17–14. Lincoln was back in the starting line-up for San Diego - his tackle-breaking 11-yard run got the Chargers moving on their next possession. Rote finished the drive by hitting Kocourek for a 26-yard touchdown; the tight end caught the ball in stride at the nine, and outran his marker to the corner of the end zone. A Rote interception let Denver pull three points closer with 1:04 remaining in the 2nd quarter, but back-to-back runs of 22 yards by Lowe and 14 yards by Lincoln set up Blair to respond in kind before the half ended.

After both sides punted to start the 3rd quarter, Lowe swept to the right and went 66 yards untouched to make it 33–17. Denver responded with a field goal. With Oakland having achieved victory in their final game at about this time, San Diego still had work to do to reach the AFL title game. They responded with 25 unanswered points. Harris had an interception the next time Denver had the ball, and Blair knocked through his third field goal late in the 3rd quarter. On the first play of the final quarter, Ladd sacked Breaux, forcing a fumble that Faison recovered. Lincoln swept to the right on the next play, and scored without difficulty from 29 yards out. The defense registered the next score themselves, a fumble bouncing up for Allen to field and return 42 yards for a touchdown. Hadl came into the game and eventually threw the final touchdown to MacKinnon in the back of the end zone. San Diego added a two-point conversion on a trick play, with Faison's catch giving them their final points of the regular season.

Paul Lowe ran for 183 yards on 17 carries, with two touchdowns. As a team, San Diego had 270 rushing yards and outgained Denver 451–231 in total offense.

=== Standings ===
AFL Western Division
| | W | L | T | PCT | DIV | PF | PA | STK |
|---|---|---|---|---|---|---|---|---|
| San Diego Chargers | 11 | 3 | 0 | .786 | 3–3 | 399 | 255 | W2 |
| Oakland Raiders | 10 | 4 | 0 | .714 | 6–0 | 363 | 282 | W8 |
| Kansas City Chiefs | 5 | 7 | 2 | .417 | 2–4 | 347 | 263 | W3 |
| Denver Broncos | 2 | 11 | 1 | .154 | 1–5 | 301 | 473 | L7 |

Note: Tie games were not officially counted in the standings in the AFL.

== Playoffs ==
1963 San Diego Chargers playoff schedule
| Round | Date | Opponent | Result | Venue | Attendance | Recap |
|---|---|---|---|---|---|---|
| Championship | January 5, 1964 | Boston Patriots | W 51–10 | Balboa Stadium | 30,127 | Recap |

=== Game summary ===
==== AFL championship game: vs. Boston Patriots ====
AFL championship game: Boston Patriots at San Diego Chargers – Game summary

| Quarter | 1 | 2 | 3 | 4 | Total |
|---|---|---|---|---|---|
| Patriots | 7 | 3 | 0 | 0 | 10 |
| Chargers | 21 | 10 | 7 | 13 | 51 |

at Balboa Stadium, San Diego, California

- Date: January 5
- Game time: 1:30 p.m. PST
- Game weather: 57 °F (14 °C), relative humidity 26%, wind 10 mph (16 km/h)
- Game attendance: 30,127
- TV announcers (ABC): Curt Gowdy and Paul Christman
- Box score

Game information

First quarter

- SDG – Tobin Rote 2-yard run (George Blair kick), 13:31. Chargers 7–0. Drive: 4 plays, 72 yards.
- SDG – Keith Lincoln 67-yard run (George Blair kick), 10:48. Chargers 14–0. Drive: 2 plays, 59 yards.
- BOS – Larry Garron 7-yard run (Gino Cappelletti kick), 7:01. Chargers 14–7. Drive: 7 plays, 66 yards.
- SDG – Paul Lowe 58-yard run (George Blair kick), 4:44. Chargers 21–7. Drive: 4 plays, 73 yards.

Second quarter

- SDG – George Blair 11-yard field goal, 7:05. Chargers 24–7. Drive: 7 plays, 70 yards.
- BOS – Gino Cappelletti 15-yard field goal, 2:41. Chargers 24–10. Drive: 11 plays, 68 yards.
- SDG – Don Norton 14-yard pass from Tobin Rote (George Blair kick), 0:48. Chargers 31–10. Drive: 7 plays, 71 yards.

Third quarter

- SDG – Lance Alworth 48-yard pass from Tobin Rote (George Blair kick), 9:14. Chargers 38–10. Drive: 6 plays, 80 yards.

Fourth quarter

- SDG – Keith Lincoln 25-yard pass from John Hadl (pass failed), 2:55. Chargers 44–10. Drive: 7 plays, 70 yards.
- SDG – John Hadl 1-yard run (George Blair kick), 1:19. Chargers 51–10. Drive: 11 plays, 80 yards.

Top passers

- BOS – Babe Parilli – 14/29, 189 yards, INT
- SDG – Tobin Rote – 10/15, 173 yards, 2 TD

Top rushers

- BOS – Harry Crump – 7 rushes, 18 yards
- SDG – Keith Lincoln – 13 rushes, 206 yards, TD

Top receivers

- BOS – Gino Cappelletti – 2 receptions, 72 yards
- SDG – Keith Lincoln – 7 receptions, 123 yards, TD

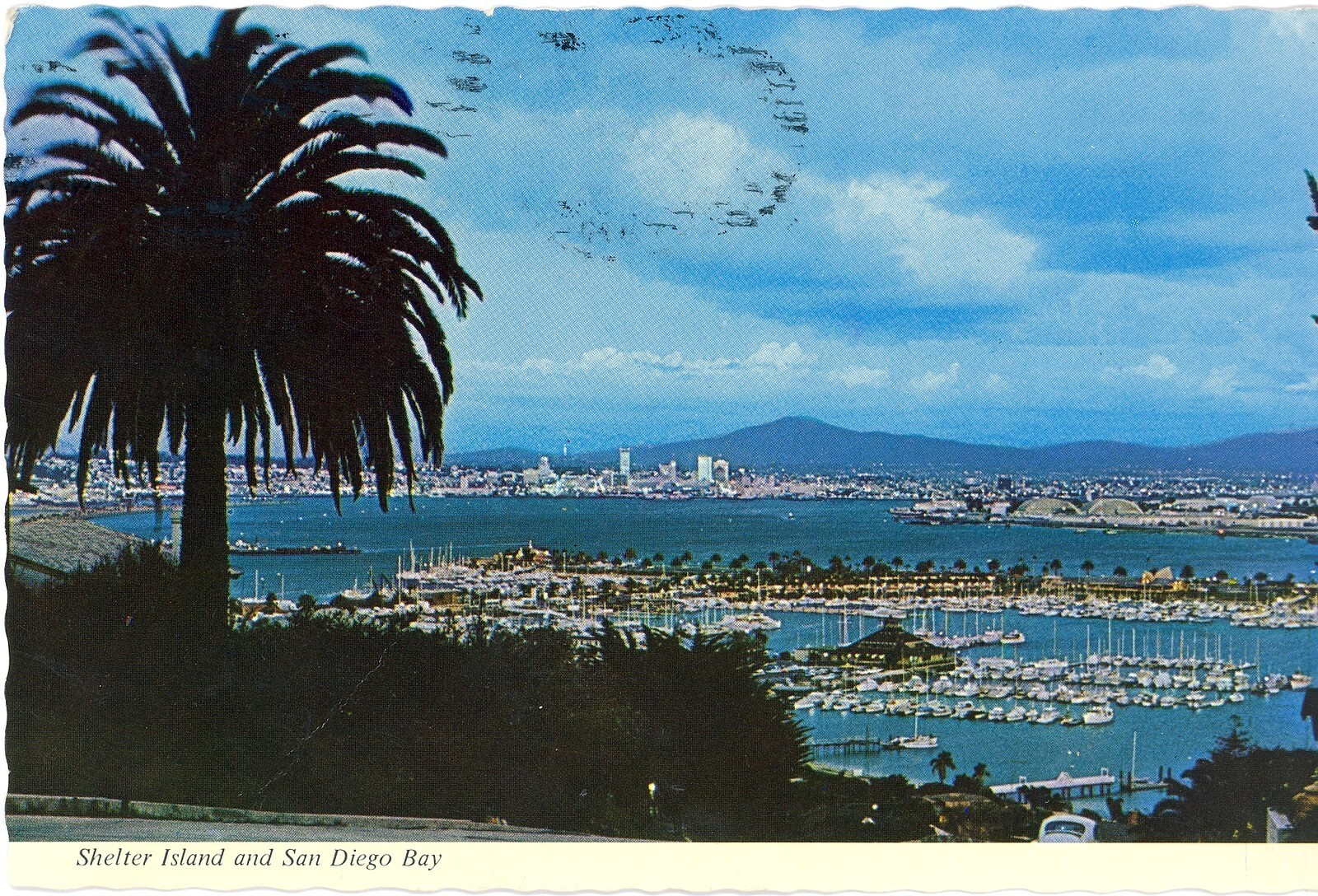
The 1963 Chargers won the only major sports championship to date for the city of San Diego.

Favored by six points heading into the game, San Diego thrashed the Patriots 51–10 to gain their only league title to date.

On the game's second play, Lincoln broke through a large hole in the middle of the line and gained 56 yards before being tackled at the Boston 4; two plays later, Rote ran the ball up the middle himself and scored a 2-yard touchdown. The Patriots went three-and-out, and Lincoln broke free again two plays later, this time taking a pitch to the left and racing along the sideline for an easy 67-yard touchdown. Boston was able to get on the scoreboard with a touchdown drive of their own, but San Diego scored again four plays into their response, with Lowe taking a pitch to the right, threading through would-be tacklers near the sideline and cutting back inside to complete a 58-yard touchdown run. Having run only ten offensive plays, San Diego had three rushes of 50-plus yards and a 21–7 lead. In the 2nd quarter, back-to-back sacks by Ladd and Faison forced a Patriots punt, Lincoln broke off a 44-yard run, and Blair extended the lead with a field goal. Boston managed a field goal of their own, but San Diego came back with another touchdown drive, Lincoln's receptions of 11 and 24 yards helping to set up Norton's 14-yard touchdown from a pass in the left flat. Mitinger intercepted Parilli a play later, and San Diego led 31–10 at halftime.

Lowe fumbled on the first Charger play of the second half, but the San Diego defense forced a punt. Lincoln had a 32-yard gain on a swing pass on the following drive, setting up an Alworth touchdown; the flanker leaped and outfought a defensive back to pull in a long pass from Rote before completing a 48-yard touchdown. Hadl replaced Rote later in the game and was involved in the final two Charger touchdowns, finding Lincoln wide open over the middle on a 25-yard pass on 4th and 2, then scoring himself on a 1-yard run.

Lincoln gained 329 yards from scrimmage, setting an AFL/NFL playoff record that still stands. He won the game's MVP award after receiving 38 of the 39 available votes. In total, San Diego gained 610 yards and scored seven touchdown against a defense that had been highly respected coming into the game. Gillman had drawn up an offensive game plan he dubbed 'Feast or Famine', using motion to confuse Boston's blitzers and spring his running backs for several large gains. Post-match, he described his team as having the greatest balance of any team he had coached. Chargers won their only AFL Championship title but in 1964 lose to the Buffalo Bills 20-7.

== Potential match with NFL champions ==
On December 29, 1963, the Chicago Bears were crowned NFL champions for the eighth time, their top-ranked defense pressuring Y. A. Tittle into five interceptions as they beat the New York Giants 14–10. San Diego's one-sided victory in the AFL title game a week later led to some speculation as to whether they might be a match for the Bears. Gillman declared that his team wouldn't disgrace themselves in such an encounter, though the Los Angeles Times noted that Chicago would represent a substantial step up in difficulty from the Patriots.

AFL commissioner Joe Foss had proposed a title game between the two leagues in a letter to his opposite number Pete Rozelle, published by Sports Illustrated in December 1963, while Gillman wrote to Bears head coach George Halas with a similar offer after the two title games had been played. Both proposals were politely declined. The first game between the two leagues, Super Bowl I, occurred three years later.

== Awards ==
=== Internal ===
On December 12, the Chargers held their annual awards banquet. The Most Inspirational Player award was conferred by teammates, while the others were decided by a fan vote.

1963 San Diego Chargers club awards
| Award | Winner |
|---|---|
| Team MVP | Tobin Rote |
| Most Inspirational Player | Chuck Allen |
| Rookie of the Year | Dick Westmoreland |
| Most Valuable Offensive Back | Keith Lincoln |
| Most Valuable Offensive End | Lance Alworth |
| Most Valuable Offensive Lineman | Ron Mix |
| Most Valuable Defensive Back | Chuck Allen |
| Most Valuable Defensive Lineman | Earl Faison |

=== External ===
Eleven Chargers were in the West division squad for the AFL All-Star game, while five were named to the Associated Press All-AFL 1st team and six to the 2nd team.

| Player | Position | All-Star | AP 1st-team All-Pro | AP 2nd-team All-Pro |
|---|---|---|---|---|
| Chuck Allen | Linebacker | Yes | | |
| Lance Alworth | Flanker | Yes | Yes | |
| George Blair | Safety / Kicker | | | Yes |
| Earl Faison | Defensive end | Yes | Yes | |
| Dick Harris | Cornerback | | | Yes |
| Emil Karas | Linebacker | Yes | | |
| Dave Kocourek | Tight end | Yes | | Yes |
| Ernie Ladd | Defensive tackle | Yes | | |
| Keith Lincoln | Running back | Yes | Yes | |
| Paul Lowe | Running back | Yes | | Yes |
| Ron Mix | Tackle | Yes | Yes | |
| Don Rogers | Center | | | Yes |
| Tobin Rote | Center | Yes | Yes | |
| Dick Westmoreland | Guard | | | Yes |
| Ernie Wright | Tackle | Yes | | |

== Bibliography ==
- Steidel, Dave (2015). The Uncrowned Champs: How the 1963 San Diego Chargers Would Have Won the Super Bowl. Carrel. ISBN 9781631440465.
- Tobias, Todd (2004). Charging Through the AFL: Los Angeles and San Diego Chargers' Football in the 1960s. Turner. ISBN 9781596520127.
