= 1963 All-AFL Team =

List of the best American Football League players of 1963

The 1963 American Football League All-League Team was selected after the 1963 American Football League season by AFL players, the Associated Press (AP), the Newspaper Enterprise Association (NEA), the New York Daily News (NYDN), and United Press International (UPI) to honor the league's top performers at each position.

== Teams ==
Offense
Position	First team	Second team
Quarterback	Tobin Rote, Chargers (AFL, AP, NEA, NYDN, UPI)	George Blanda, Oilers (AP, NEA, NYDN); Jack Kemp, Bills (UPI)
Halfback	Clem Daniels, Raiders (AFL, AP, NEA, NYDN, UPI)	Paul Lowe, Chargers (AP, NEA, UPI)
Fullback	Keith Lincoln, Chargers (AFL, AP, NEA, NYDN, UPI); Cookie Gilchrist, Bills (NYDN)	Cookie Gilchrist, Bills (AP, UPI); Larry Garron, Patriots (NEA); Billy Joe, Broncos (NYDN)
Wide receiver	Lance Alworth, Chargers (AFL, AP, NEA, NYDN, UPI); Art Powell, Raiders (AFL, AP, NEA, NYDN, UPI)	Elbert Dubenion, Bills (AP, NYDN); Charlie Hennigan, Oilers (NEA, NYDN, UPI); Bill Miller, Bills (AP); Bake Turner, Jets (NEA); Lionel Taylor, Broncos (UPI)
Tight end	Fred Arbanas, Chiefs (AFL, AP, UPI); Dave Kocourek, Chargers (NEA, NYDN)	Dave Kocourek, Chargers (AP, UPI); Fred Arbanas, Chiefs (NEA, NYDN)
Tackle	Ron Mix, Chargers (AFL, AP, NEA, NYDN, UPI); Stew Barber, Bills (AP, NYDN, UPI); Jim Tyrer, Chiefs (AFL, NEA)	Charlie Long, Patriots (AP, NYDN, UPI); Jim Tyrer, Chiefs (AP, NYDN, UPI); Stew Barber, Bills (NEA); Jack Klotz, Jets (NEA); Eldon Danenhauer, Broncos (UPI)
Guard	Billy Shaw, Bills (AFL, AP, NEA, NYDN, UPI); Bob Talamini, Oilers (AFL, AP, NEA, NYDN); Billy Neighbors, Patriots (UPI)	Billy Neighbors, Patriots (AP, NEA, NYDN); Wayne Hawkins, Raiders (AP, NEA); Bob Talamini, Oilers (UPI)
Center	Jim Otto, Raiders (AFL, AP, NEA, NYDN, UPI)	Don Rogers, Chargers (AP, NYDN); Bob Schmidt, Oilers (NEA, UPI)

Defense
Position	First team	Second team
Defensive end	Larry Eisenhauer, Patriots (AFL, AP, NEA, NYDN, UPI); Earl Faison, Chargers (AFL, AP, NYDN, UPI); Dalva Allen, Raiders (NEA)	Mel Branch, Chiefs (AP, NEA, NYDN, UPI); Dalva Allen, Raiders (AP, UPI); Earl Faison, Chargers (NEA); Don Floyd, Oilers (NYDN)
Defensive tackle	Houston Antwine, Patriots (AFL, AP, NEA, NYDN, UPI); Tom Sestak, Bills (AFL, AP, NEA, NYDN, UPI)	Jerry Mays, Chiefs (AP, NEA, NYDN, UPI); Bud McFadin, Broncos (AP, NYDN); Ernie Ladd, Chargers (NEA); Dick Guesman, Jets (NYDN); Ed Husmann, Oilers (UPI)
Middle linebacker	Archie Matsos, Raiders (AFL, AP, NYDN, UPI); Nick Buoniconti, Boston (NEA)	Nick Buoniconti, Boston (AP, NYDN, UPI); Archie Matsos, Raiders (NEA)
Outside linebacker	E. J. Holub, Chiefs (AFL, AP, NEA, NYDN, UPI); Larry Grantham, Jets (AP, NEA, NYDN, UPI); Tom Addison, Patriots (AFL)	Tom Addison, Patriots (AP, NEA, NYDN, UPI); Doug Cline, Oilers (AP, NYDN, UPI); Emil Karas, Chargers (NEA)
Cornerback	Fred Williamson, Raiders (AFL, AP, NEA, NYDN, UPI); Tony Banfield, Oilers (AP, NYDN, UPI); Dave Grayson, Chiefs (AFL); Dick Westmoreland, Chargers (NEA)	Dick Westmoreland, Chargers (AP, NYDN, UPI); Joe Krakoski, Raiders (AP, NYDN); Dick Harris, Chargers (AP); Tony Banfield, Oilers (NEA); Dave Grayson, Chiefs (NYDN); Bobby Jancik, Oilers (NYDN); Ron Hall, Patriots (UPI)
Safety	Fred Glick, Oilers (AFL, AP, NEA, NYDN, UPI); Tommy Morrow, Raiders (AP, NEA, NYDN, UPI); Goose Gonsoulin, Broncos (AFL)	George Blair, Chargers (AP, UPI); Johnny Robinson, Chiefs (NEA, UPI); Goose Gonsoulin, Broncos (NEA); Clyde Washington, Jets (NEA)
