= 1963 Denver Broncos season =

American football team season

- General manager: Jack Faulkner
- Head coach: Jack Faulkner
- Home stadium: Bears Stadium; University of Denver Stadium (1st game)

Results
- Record: 2–11–1
- Division place: 4th AFL Western
- Playoffs: Did not qualify

The 1963 Denver Broncos season was the fourth season for the team in the American Football League (AFL). They finished with a record of two wins, eleven losses, and one tie, and finished fourth in the AFL's Western Division, and also the worst record in the league. The Broncos went winless in their final 10 games of the season.

The Broncos had the fewest passing yards in the AFL in 1963, throwing for only 2,487 yards, or 177.6 yards per game. For comparison, the league's top passing team — the Houston Oilers — threw for 229.2 yards per game. Broncos wide receiver Lionel Taylor led the league with 78 receptions.

The Broncos allowed 473 points in 1963, the most in the history of the AFL, and second most all time for a 14-game season. The Broncos' 40 passing touchdowns allowed in 1963 were the most in the history of pro football until the New Orleans Saints broke the record in 2015.

== Personnel ==
=== Staff / Coaches ===
1963 Denver Broncos staff
Front office: Team Owner / Chairman of the Board – Gerald Phipps; Team President – Calvin W Kunz Jr; Vice President – Earl R Howsam; Director of Player Personnel – Ray Malavasi; Head coaches: General manager / Head Coach – Jack Faulkner; Offensive coaches: Offensive Ends – Mac Speedie; Offensive Line – Red Miller	Defensive coaches: Defensive Line – Dale Dodrill; Defensive Backfield – Ed Hughes

=== Roster ===
1963 Denver Broncos roster
Quarterbacks (QB): 19 Don Breaux; 18 John McCormick; 7 Mickey Slaughter; Running backs (RB): 30 Hewritt Dixon; 3 Billy Joe; 21 Gene Mingo K; 34 Donnie Stone; Wide receivers (WR): 84 Don Coffey; 89 Bill Groman; 82 Bob Scarpitto; 87 Lionel Taylor; Tight ends (TE): 88 Gene Prebola; 80 Tom Rychlec	Offensive linemen (OL): 62 Ernie Barnes G; 75 Eldon Danenhauer T; 67 Bob McCullough G; 68 Tom Nomina G/DT; 76 Harold Olson T; 71 Jim Perkins T; 72 Jerry Sturm C; Defensive linemen (DL): 61 Chuck Gavin DE; 74 Gordy Holz DT; 73 Ike Lassiter DE; 64 Bud McFadin DT; 77 Anton Peters DT/DE	Linebackers (LB): 53 Tom Erlandson OLB; 51 Jim Fraser OLB/P; 50 Jerry Hopkins MLB; 54 Wahoo McDaniel MLB; 33 John Nocera OLB; Defensive backs (DB): 24 Willie Brown CB; 23 Goose Gonsoulin FS; 26 Tom Janik CB/S; 47 John McGeever CB; 27 Charlie Mitchell CB/RB; 46 Bob Zeman SS; Special teams (ST)	Rookies in italics

== Regular season ==
Week	Date	Opponent	Result	Record	Venue	Attendance	Recap
1	September 7	**Kansas City Chiefs**	**L** 7–59	0–1	University of Denver Stadium	21,115	Recap
2	September 14	at Houston Oilers	**L** 14–20	0–2	Jeppesen Stadium	23,147	Recap
3	September 22	Bye week					
4	September 29	Boston Patriots	**W** 14–10	1–2	Bears Stadium	18,636	Recap
5	October 6	**San Diego Chargers**	**W** 50–34	2–2	Bears Stadium	18,428	Recap
6	October 13	Houston Oilers	**L** 24–33	2–3	Bears Stadium	24,087	Recap
7	October 18	at Boston Patriots	**L** 21–40	2–4	Fenway Park	25,418	Recap
8	October 26	at New York Jets	**T** 35–35	2–4–1	Polo Grounds	20,377	Recap
9	November 3	Buffalo Bills	**L** 28–30	2–5–1	Bears Stadium	19,424	Recap
10	November 9	at Buffalo Bills	**L** 17–27	2–6–1	War Memorial Stadium	30,989	Recap
11	November 17	New York Jets	**L** 9–14	2–7–1	Bears Stadium	14,247	Recap
	November 24	Scheduled AFL games postponed to December 22					
12	November 28	**Oakland Raiders**	**L** 10–26	2–8–1	Bears Stadium	14,763	Recap
13	December 7	at **Kansas City Chiefs**	**L** 21–52	2–9–1	Municipal Stadium	17,443	Recap
14	December 15	at **Oakland Raiders**	**L** 31–35	2–10–1	Frank Youell Field	15,223	Recap
15	December 22	at **San Diego Chargers**	**L** 20–58	2–11–1	Balboa Stadium	31,312	Recap
Note: Intra-division opponents are in **bold** text.

== Standings ==
AFL Western Division
	W	L	T	PCT	DIV	PF	PA	STK
San Diego Chargers	11	3	0	.786	3–3	399	255	W2
Oakland Raiders	10	4	0	.714	6–0	363	282	W8
Kansas City Chiefs	5	7	2	.417	2–4	347	263	W3
Denver Broncos	2	11	1	.154	1–5	301	473	L7

Note: Tie games were not officially counted in the standings in the AFL.
