= Bob Scarpitto =

American football player (born 1939)

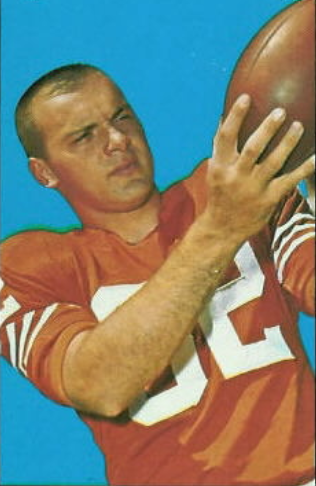
- Scarpitto on Topps card, 1965

No. 46, 82
- Positions: Punter, flanker

Personal information
- Born: January 7, 1939 (age 87); Rahway, New Jersey, U.S.
- Listed height: 5 ft 11 in (1.80 m)
- Listed weight: 192 lb (87 kg)

Career information
- High school: Rahway
- College: Notre Dame
- AFL draft: 1961: 9th round, 71st overall pick

Career history
- San Diego Chargers (1961); Denver Broncos (1962–1967); Boston Patriots (1968)

Awards and highlights
- AFL All-Star (1966); 2× AFL punting yards leader (1966, 1967); AFL All-Time Second Team; AFL record: Most punting yards in a season: 4,713 (1967)

Career AFL statistics
- Punts: 283
- Punting yards: 12,408
- Punting average: 43.8
- Longest punt: 87
- Receptions: 156
- Receiving yards: 2,651
- Receiving touchdowns: 27
- Stats at Pro Football Reference

Bob Scarpitto (born January 7, 1939) is an American former professional football player who was a punter and flanker in the American Football League (AFL) for the San Diego Chargers in 1961, the Denver Broncos from 1962 through 1967, and then the Boston Patriots in 1968. He was an AFL All-Star in 1966. The Pro Football Hall of Fame selected him to the second-team All-Time AFL Team as a punter. He played college football for the Notre Dame Fighting Irish.

== Early life ==
Scarpitto was born on January 7, 1939, in Rahway, New Jersey. Scarpitto played high school football at Rahway High School, where was a running back and quarterback; as well as being a kicker, while also playing defense. He played quarterback in T formation variations and halfback in single-wing formations.

The Newark Star-Leger named him first-team All-State at back as a junior in 1955, the only junior selected to the first team. As a junior he had 12 running touchdowns and five passing touchdowns. He also punted and played on the team's defense The Associated Press (AP) unanimously selected him as a first-team All-State back as a senior in 1956, and he was described at the time by one sports editor as "the best all-around back in the state, bar none". He scored 109 points that season, with an 8.5 yards per carry average, while also punting and excelling defensively. The Newark Star-Ledger also named him first-team All-State as a senior in 1956.

Scarpitto also played on the school's basketball team, and was a shortstop on its baseball team. The Newark Star-Ledger named him second-team All-State at shortstop as a junior in 1956, and first-team All-State at shortstop as a senior in 1957. He was 5 ft 11 in (1.80 m) and 180 lb (81.6 kg) as a senior in 1957.

== College career ==
As a high school senior, Scarpitto was pursued by 70 colleges and universities to play football. He decided to attend the University of Notre Dame. Scarpitto played three years of varsity football for the Notre Dame Fighting Irish from 1958 to 1960, at running back.

As a sophomore in 1958, he had 28 carries for 149 yards (5.3 yards per carry), and six receptions for 155 yards and one touchdown. The touchdown came on a 52-yard pass reception against the University of Iowa in late November. Scarpitto averaged 28.5 yards per reception. In 1958, Rich Kreitling of the University of Illinois led college football in yards per reception (29.9 on 23 receptions), with Gail Cogdill second of Washington State University second (22.8 on 21 receptions). In an October game against Duke, he rushed 12 times for 77 yards, including a 30-yard run. In a November 30 game against the USC Trojans, he had an 82-yard punt return.

As a junior in 1959, Scarpitto had 199 yards in 59 carries, with three rushing touchdowns. He also led Notre Dame with 15 receptions, 297 receiving yards and four receiving touchdowns. Scarpitto had a two-touchdown game against Northwestern University on October 24, one rushing and one on a 52-yard pass reception. He had a 58-yard touchdown reception against the University of Pittsburgh in mid-November. Scarpitto also served as Notre Dame's punter in 1959. Notre Dame lacked depth as a team that season, and Scarpitto and two teammates were in on every offensive play in an early November game against Georgia Tech. He was a United Press International (UPI) honorable mention All-America in 1959.

As a senior in 1960, Scarpitto had 221 yards on 58 carries with five rushing touchdowns; and eight receptions for 164 yards. Four of his touchdowns came in the 1960 season's first three games. He led Notre Dame in scoring, was second on the team in receptions and third in rushing. He shared punting duties with three other players, including Daryle Lamonica, and led the team with a 40.0 yards per punt average in 15 punts. He also had 10 kickoff returns for 230 yards. On defense he had eight tackles and two pass break-ups.

== Professional career ==
The San Diego Chargers selected Scarpitto in the ninth round of the 1961 American Football League Draft, 71st overall. He was not selected in the 1961 National Football League draft. In 1961, Scarpitto started three games at flanker for the Chargers, with nine receptions for 163 yards and two touchdowns. On November 12, he caught the game-winning touchdown pass from future Hall of Fame quarterback Jack Kemp in the fourth quarter against the Denver Broncos. He did not punt for the Chargers in 1961.

The Chargers traded Scarpitto to the Denver Broncos before the start of the 1962 season. Scarpitto had a 49-yard touchdown reception in the Broncos opening game that season, a 30–21 win over the Chargers. Scarpitto started 13 games at flanker for the Broncos in 1962, with 35 receptions for 667 yards and six touchdowns. His 19.1 yards per reception was third best in the AFL.

In 1963, Scarpitto started eight games at flanker, with 21 receptions for 463 yards (22.0 yards per reception) and five touchdowns. In three games from October 13 to October 26, he caught 12 passes with four touchdowns. He had 40-yard and 55-yard touchdown receptions against the Houston Oilers on October 13 (with four receptions totaling 134 yards); six receptions for 96 yards and one touchdown on October 18 against the Boston Patriots; and a 66-yard touchdown reception against the New York Jets on October 26. The following week he had one reception for a 43-yard touchdown against the Buffalo Bills. Scarpitto suffered a broken collarbone in a November 28 game against the Oakland Raiders and did not play in the 1963 season's final three games.

In 1964, Scarpitto started 10 games for the Broncos, with 35 receptions for 375 yards and four touchdowns. He started 10 games the following season, with 32 receptions for 585 yards and five touchdowns. His 18.3 yards per reception was fourth in the AFL. He had five receptions for 108 yards and two touchdown receptions (13 and 33 yards) in the first game of the season against the Chargers. He caught a 90-yard touchdown pass against the Oilers on October 17. He caught two touchdown passes against the Patriots on December 12 (22 and 29 yards). He also had four rushing attempts for 94 yards that season.

Scarpitto became Denver's punter in 1965. He punted 67 times for 2,833 yards with a 42.3 yards per punt average (fifth best in the AFL). He had the longest punt in the AFL that season, 74 yards. In a mid-November game against the Oilers, Scarpitto kicked a 64-yard punt that went out of bounds at Houston's two-foot line, which was pivotal in the Broncos winning the game. In an early October game against the Jets, Scarpitto had two receptions for 51 yards and one run of 44 yards, which came on a fake punt. He had a run of 27 yards against the Raiders on November 21. He had a 31-yard run on a fake punt against the Kansas City Chiefs on December 19.

Scarpitto started all 14 Broncos' games in 1966, and was selected to play in the AFL All-Star Game for the first and only time in his career. He caught 21 passes for 335 yards and had four receiving touchdowns. He had three touchdown receptions in the last game of the season against the Bills. He also had 110 yards in four rushing attempts with another touchdown. His rushing touchdown was a 63-yard run on a fake punt against the Chargers. He punted 77 times that season, for 3,480 yards and a 45.2 yards per punt average, all of which led the AFL that season. He also had the longest punt of the season in the AFL (70 yards). In a Sporting News poll of players, Scarpitto was named first-team All-AFL at punter that season. He was the West team's punter in the January 1967 All-Star Game, and a poor punt led to an East touchdown.

In 1967, Scarpitto was a reserve receiver, catching only one pass on the season, but a full-time punter. In 1967, the Broncos had the fewest first downs in the NFL (172), 31 less than the next lowest team and 110 less than the league leading New York Jets. Scarpitto punted 105 times in 1967, for 4,713 yards and a 44.9 yards per punt average; again leading the AFL in all of these categories. He again had the league's longest punt (73 yards). In a September 10 loss to the Raiders, 51–0, Scarpitto set the AFL record for most punts (12) and most punting yards (565) in a single game (while averaging 47.1 yards per punt in that game). He was again named first-team All-AFL by The Sporting News. As of the 2017 NFL off-season, Scarpitto held at least 3 Broncos franchise records, including most punts in a season (105) and a game (12) and most punting yards in a game (565).

The Broncos waived Scarpitto before the start of the 1968 season, his final season in the AFL. He was signed by the Boston Patriots primarily as a punter, though he did have two pass receptions on the season, including one touchdown reception. In the third game of the season against the Broncos, he had a career-high, and AFL record, 87-yard punt. The Patriots defeated the Broncos, 20–17. Through the 2025 season, the 87-yard punt remained tied for eighth longest in AFL/NFL history. He punted 34 times that season, with a 40.6 yards per punt average.

Over his eight-year AFL career, Scarpitto had 156 receptions and 27 touchdown catches, average 17 yards per reception. As a punter, he had a 43.8 yards per punts average on 283 punts, and over 200 yards rushing on fake punts, with one touchdown.

In 1969, he played for the Las Vegas Cowboys of the Continental Football League, as a punter.

== Honors ==
The Pro Football Hall of Fame selected him to the second-team All-Time AFL Team as a punter. He was included on the Hall of Fame's list of senior candidates for consideration as class of 2025 inductees.

== See also ==
- Other American Football League players
