= 1963 New York Jets season =

1963 season of AFL team New York Jets

- Owner: Sonny Werblin
- Head coach: Weeb Ewbank
- Home stadium: Polo Grounds

Results
- Record: 5–8–1
- Division place: 4th AFL East
- Playoffs: Did not qualify

The 1963 New York Jets season was the fourth season for the team in the American Football League (AFL) and the first under the moniker Jets, which followed a change in ownership. The season began with the team trying to improve on their 5–9 record from 1962 under new head coach Weeb Ewbank. Playing their final season at the Polo Grounds in Upper Manhattan, the Jets finished at 5–8–1 in 1963; they relocated to Shea Stadium in the borough of Queens the following season.

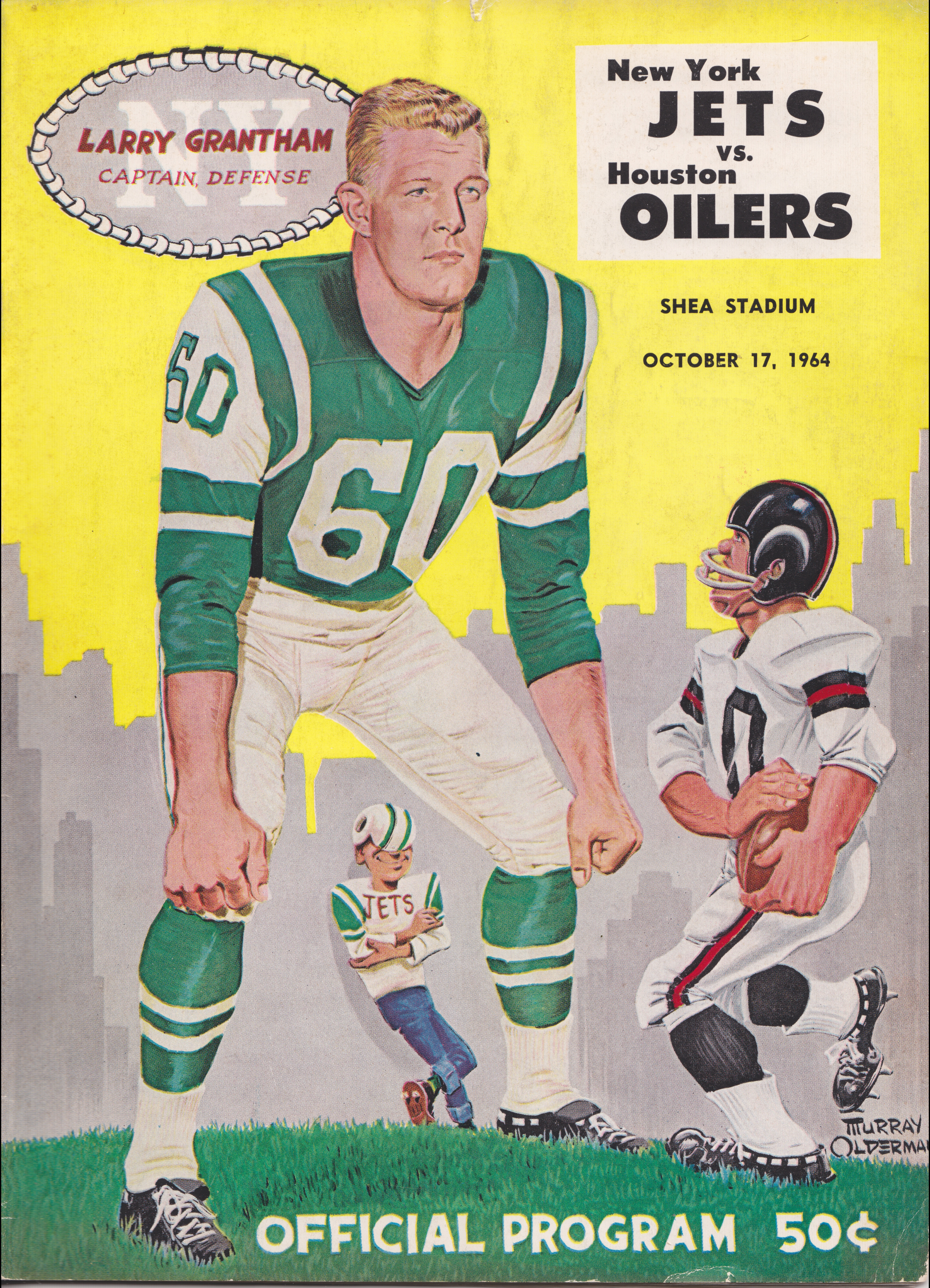
1964 game program showing the original Jets uniform of 1963; the helmet is not shown.

In rebranding itself as the Jets, the club abandoned its navy-blue and gold uniforms in favor of kelly green and white. The jerseys had opposite-colored sleeves with thick stripes on the shoulders and cuffs, above and below the TV numerals. The pants were white with two parallel green stripes on each side. The new helmets were white with a single green stripe down the center; the logo on each side was a silhouette of a jet airplane in green, with the word "JETS" in thick white sans-serif italics along the fuselage.

Ewbank had led the NFL's Baltimore Colts for nine seasons (1954–62), including consecutive league titles in 1958 and 1959. Fired in January 1963, he was hired by the Jets in mid-April.

== Roster ==
1963 New York Jets roster
Quarterbacks (QB): 2 Ed Chlebek; 17 Galen Hall; 19 Dick Wood; Running backs (RB): 20 Bill Perkins; 30 Mark Smolinski; 31 Bill Mathis; 45 Dick Christy; Wide receivers (WR): 13 Don Maynard; 29 Bake Turner; 84 Ken Gregory; Tight ends (TE): 85 Gene Heeter; 89 Dee Mackey	Offensive linemen (OL): 52 Mike Hudock C; 61 Dan Ficca G; 62 Sid Fournet G; 63 Roy Hord G; 75 Winston Hill T; 78 Jack Klotz T; 79 Sherman Plunkett T; Defensive linemen (DL): 72 Charlie Janerette DT; 73 Paul Rochester DT; 77 Dick Guesman DT/K; 86 Bob Watters DE; 87 LaVerne Torczon DE; 88 Bob McAdams DE/DT	Linebackers (LB): 57 Dave Yohn MLB; 60 Larry Grantham OLB; 64 Pete Perreault OLB; 67 Jim Price OLB/MLB; 82 Ed Cooke OLB; Defensive backs (DB): 25 Marshall Starks CB; 26 Dave West CB; 40 Dainard Paulson SS; 42 Clyde Washington CB/FS; 46 Bill Baird FS; Special teams (ST): 33 Curley Johnson P	Reserve: -- Will Renfro DE (IR); 26 Tony Stricker CB (IR); Rookies in italics

== Schedule ==
Week	Date	Opponent	Result	Record	Venue	Attendance	Recap
1	September 8	at **Boston Patriots**	**L** 14–38	0–1	Alumni Stadium	24,120	Recap
2	Bye						
3	September 22	**Houston Oilers**	**W** 24–17	1–1	Polo Grounds	9,336	Recap
4	September 28	Oakland Raiders	**W** 10–7	2–1	Polo Grounds	17,100	Recap
5	October 5	**Boston Patriots**	**W** 31–24	3–1	Polo Grounds	16,769	Recap
6	October 13	at San Diego Chargers	**L** 20–24	3–2	Balboa Stadium	27,189	Recap
7	October 20	at Oakland Raiders	**L** 26–49	3–3	Frank Youell Field	15,557	Recap
8	October 26	Denver Broncos	**T** 35–35	3–3–1	Polo Grounds	22,553	Recap
9	November 2	San Diego Chargers	**L** 7–53	3–4–1	Polo Grounds	20,798	Recap
10	November 10	at **Houston Oilers**	**L** 27–31	3–5–1	Jeppesen Stadium	23,619	Recap
11	November 17	at Denver Broncos	**W** 14–9	4–5–1	Bears Stadium	14,247	Recap
	November 24	Games postponed to December 22					
12	December 1	Kansas City Chiefs	**W** 17–0	5–5–1	Polo Grounds	18,824	Recap
13	December 8	at **Buffalo Bills**	**L** 14–45	5–6–1	War Memorial Stadium	20,222	Recap
14	December 14	**Buffalo Bills**	**L** 10–19	5–7–1	Polo Grounds	6,526	Recap
15	December 22	at Kansas City Chiefs	**L** 0–48	5–8–1	Municipal Stadium	12,202	Recap
Note: Intra-division opponents are in **bold** text.

== Standings ==
AFL Eastern Division
	W	L	T	PCT	DIV	PF	PA	STK
Boston Patriots	7	6	1	.538	4–2	327	257	L1
Buffalo Bills	7	6	1	.538	3–3	304	291	W2
Houston Oilers	6	8	0	.429	3–3	302	372	L4
New York Jets	5	8	1	.385	2–4	249	399	L3

Note: Tie games were not officially counted in the standings in the AFL.

AFL Western Division
	W	L	T	PCT	DIV	PF	PA	STK
San Diego Chargers	11	3	0	.786	3–3	399	255	W2
Oakland Raiders	10	4	0	.714	6–0	363	282	W8
Kansas City Chiefs	5	7	2	.417	2–4	347	263	W3
Denver Broncos	2	11	1	.154	1–5	301	473	L7

Note: Tie games were not officially counted in the standings in the AFL.
