= Two-a-days (football) =

Term for two practices in one day in American football

In American football, two-a-days occur when a team or individual trains on two occasions during the same day. Two-a-days are used primarily to get in shape for the season, and learn new strategies.

In the National Football League, two-a-days were eliminated in the 2011 collective bargaining agreement. Previously, teams ran double sessions and sometimes triple sessions for several weeks during the pre-season. Those practices are called training camp, and most teams travel to distant locations to hold their preparations.

== In the media ==
MTV featured a show entitled Two-A-Days from 2006 to 2007 which featured the football team of Hoover High School in Hoover, Alabama. The show chronicled the team's players' social lives as well as their involvement in the football team.

== Criticisms ==
In recent years, two-a-days have become less common due to controversy surrounding them. Recent years have marked an increase in player injury being brought about by heat-related causes. Heat stroke has become a major concern to football, and "two-a-days" are being red-flagged as a risky practice in places that experience traditionally hot weather in the summer. To address heat concerns, the National Collegiate Athletic Association (NCAA) in 2003 prohibited two-a-days on consecutive days and during the first five days of practice. The National Athletic Trainers' Association suggested similar guidelines in June. Subsequently, two-a-days have become uncommon at the college level of football. Guidelines for high school football vary by state, but are becoming uncommon, although many high schools still continue to run two-a-days, especially in the southern states.

Players in the National Football League demanded the end of two-a-days as part of their collective bargaining in negotiations for a new contract in 2011, and became a part of their contract.

== See also ==
- High school football
