= 1963 Houston Oilers season =

NFL team season

- Owner: Bud Adams
- General manager: Pop Ivy
- Head coach: Pop Ivy
- Home stadium: Jeppesen Stadium

Results
- Record: 6–8
- Division place: 3rd AFL Eastern
- Playoffs: Did not qualify

The Houston Oilers played their fourth season as a professional American football franchise in 1963. Houston had won the first two league championships and were runners-up in 1962, which went to a second overtime. In 1963, the Oilers lost their final four games to finish at 6–8, 1½ games behind the Boston Patriots and Buffalo Bills in the Eastern division. They failed to win the division (and qualify for the title game) for the first time in franchise history.

== Season schedule ==
Week	Date	Opponent	Result	Record	Venue	Attendance	Recap
1	September 7	Oakland Raiders	**L** 13–24	0–1	Jeppesen Stadium	24,749	Recap
2	September 14	Denver Broncos	**W** 20–14	1–1	Jeppesen Stadium	22,855	Recap
3	September 22	at **New York Jets**	**L** 17–24	1–2	Polo Grounds	9,336	Recap
4	September 28	at **Buffalo Bills**	**W** 31–20	2–2	War Memorial Stadium	32,340	Recap
5	October 6	at Kansas City Chiefs	**L** 7–28	2–3	Municipal Stadium	27,801	Recap
6	October 13	at Denver Broncos	**W** 33–24	3–3	Bears Stadium	24,087	Recap
7	October 20	**Buffalo Bills**	**W** 28–14	4–3	Jeppesen Stadium	23,948	Recap
8	October 27	Kansas City Chiefs	**W** 28–7	5–3	Jeppesen Stadium	26,331	Recap
9	November 1	at **Boston Patriots**	**L** 3–45	5–4	Fenway Park	31,185	Recap
10	November 10	**New York Jets**	**W** 31–27	6–4	Jeppesen Stadium	23,615	Recap
11	November 17	Bye week					
	November 24	Scheduled AFL games postponed to December 22					
12	December 1	at San Diego Chargers	**L** 0–27	6–5	Balboa Stadium	31,713	Recap
13	December 8	**Boston Patriots**	**L** 28–46	6–6	Jeppesen Stadium	23,462	Recap
14	December 15	San Diego Chargers	**L** 14–20	6–7	Jeppesen Stadium	18,540	Recap
15	December 22	at Oakland Raiders	**L** 49–52	6–8	Frank Youell Field	17,401	Recap
Note: Intra-division opponents are in **bold** text.

== Standings ==
AFL Eastern Division
	W	L	T	PCT	DIV	PF	PA	STK
Boston Patriots	7	6	1	.538	4–2	327	257	L1
Buffalo Bills	7	6	1	.538	3–3	304	291	W2
Houston Oilers	6	8	0	.429	3–3	302	372	L4
New York Jets	5	8	1	.385	2–4	249	399	L3

Note: Tie games were not officially counted in the standings in the AFL.

== Season summary ==
=== Week 1 vs Raiders ===
Week One: Oakland Raiders (0–0) at Houston Oilers (0–0)

Quarter	1	2	3	4	Total
Raiders	0	0	10	14	24
Oilers	6	0	0	7	13

at Jeppesen Stadium, Houston, Texas

- Date: September 7
- Game weather: 88 °F (31 °C)
- Game attendance: 24,749
- Box Score

Game information

First quarter

- HOU – George Blanda 30-yard field goal. Oilers 3–0.
- HOU – George Blanda 46-yard field goal. Oilers 6–0.

Second quarter

- No scoring

Third quarter

- OAK – Clem Daniels 2-yard run (Mike Mercer kick). Raiders 7–6.
- OAK – Mike Mercer 11-yard field goal. Raiders 10–6.

Fourth quarter

- OAK – Art Powell 85-yard pass from Tom Flores (Mike Mercer kick). Raiders 17–6.
- OAK – Ken Herock 15-yard fumble return (Mike Mercer kick). Raiders 24–6.
- HOU – Charley Hennigan 34-yard pass from Jacky Lee (George Blanda kick). Raiders 24–13.

Top passers

- OAK – Tom Flores – 7/21, 217 yards, TD
- HOU – Jacky Lee – 10/28, 123 yards, TD, INT

Top rushers

- OAK – Clem Daniels – 16 rushes, 73 yards, TD
- HOU – Charley Tolar – 9 rushes, 44 yards

Top receivers

- OAK – Art Powell – 7 receptions, 181 yards, TD
- HOU – Charley Hennigan – 7 receptions, 101 yards, TD

=== Roster ===
1963 Houston Oilers roster
Quarterbacks: 16 George Blanda K; 15 Jacky Lee; Running backs: 35 Bo Dickinson; 32 Dave Smith; 47 Bill Tobin; 44 Charlie Tolar; Wide receivers: 88 Willard Dewveall; 28 Charley Frazier; 87 Charley Hennigan; Tight ends: 81 Bob McLeod	Offensive linemen: 68 Tom Goode G; 73 Bob Kelly T; 77 Rich Michael T; 52 Bob Schmidt C; 76 Walter Suggs T; 61 Bob Talamini G; 63 Hogan Wharton G; Defensive linemen: 78 Ed Culpepper DT; 80 Gary Cutsinger DE; 82 Ed Husmann DT; 74 Dudley Meredith DT; 83 Ron Nery DE; 86 Bucky Wegener DE	Linebackers: 33 Gene Babb MLB; 85 Danny Brabham OLB; 31 Doug Cline OLB; 30 Mike Dukes OLB; 45 Larry Onesti MLB; Defensive backs: 40 Tony Banfield CB; 27 Fred Glick FS; 41 Mark Johnston CB; 43 Jim Norton SS/P; 23 Bobby Jancik CB	Taxi squad: 55 John Frongillo C/G; 45 Randy Kerbow WR; Reserve lists: 84 Johnny Baker TE (IR); 20 Billy Cannon RB (IR); 75 Don Floyd DE (IR); rookies in italics
