= Don Rogers (offensive lineman) =

American football player (born 1936)

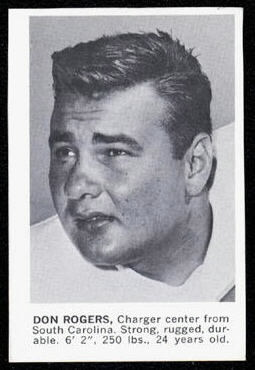

No. 52
- Positions: Center, guard

Personal information
- Born: December 4, 1936 (age 89); South Orange, New Jersey, U.S.
- Listed height: 6 ft 2 in (1.88 m)
- Listed weight: 240 lb (109 kg)

Career information
- High school: Columbia (NJ)
- College: South Carolina (1955–1958)
- NFL draft: 1959: 7th round, 74th overall pick

Career history
- Los Angeles / San Diego Chargers (1960–1964)

Awards and highlights
- AFL champion (1963); Second-team All-AFL (1963)

Career AFL statistics
- Games played: 68
- Games started: 66
- Stats at Pro Football Reference

Donald Clinton Rogers (born December 4, 1936) is an American former professional football player who was an offensive lineman for five seasons with the San Diego Chargers of the American Football League (AFL). He played college football for the South Carolina Gamecocks.
