= Bob McCullough (American football) =

American football player (born 1940)

No. 67
- Position: Offensive guard

Personal information
- Born: November 18, 1940 (age 85); Helena, Montana, U.S.
- Listed height: 6 ft 2 in (1.88 m)
- Listed weight: 245 lb (111 kg)

Career information
- High school: Helena
- College: Colorado (1958–1961)
- AFL draft: 1962: undrafted

Career history
- Denver Broncos (1962–1965)
- Stats at Pro Football Reference

Robert Vernon McCullough (born November 18, 1940) is an American former professional football offensive guard who played for the Denver Broncos of the American Football League (AFL). He played college football for the Colorado Buffaloes.

== Early life ==
Robert Vernon McCullough was born on November 18, 1940, in Helena, Montana. He played high school football at Helena High School as a fullback on offense and tackle on defense. He earned Scholastic Magazines high school All-American honors as a senior in 1957.

== College career ==
McCullough enrolled at the University of Colorado to play college football for the Buffaloes. He was on the freshman team in 1958 and a three-year varsity letterman from 1959 to 1961. He started the final five games of the 1959 season at tackle. He missed the 1960 season due to injury. In 1961, he was the backup to two-time consensus All-American Joe Romig.

== Professional career ==
After going undrafted in the 1962 NFL and AFL drafts, McCullough signed with the Denver Broncos of the American Football League in April 1962. He received a $2,500 signing bonus and a first-year salary of $11,500. He was named to Pro Football Illustrated's AFL All-Rookie Team for the 1962 season. McCullough played in all 56 games, starting 54, at guard for the Broncos from 1962 to 1965. On August 20, 1966, he announced his retirement from pro football due to injury concerns. Doctors told McCullough that he could be paralyzed for life if he re-injured his neck. McCullough had separated vertabrae in his neck four times, the most recent being two weeks before his retirement.

== Personal life ==
McCullough later served in the United States Army.
