= 1963 Buffalo Bills season =

4th season in franchise history

- Owner: Ralph Wilson
- Head coach: Lou Saban
- Home stadium: War Memorial Stadium

Results
- Record: 7–6–1
- Division place: 2nd AFL Eastern (playoff)
- Playoffs: Lost Divisional Playoffs (vs. Patriots) 8–26

The 1963 Buffalo Bills season was the team’s fourth season in the American Football League. Winless after their first four games, Buffalo won seven of the final ten games, including the final two over the New York Jets, to finish with their second-consecutive 7–6–1 record, tied with the Boston Patriots atop the Eastern division. In this era, this required a tiebreaker playoff, the AFL's first. The Patriots and Bills had split their season series, each team winning at home, and the Bills were slight favorites as playoff hosts.

The playoff game on December 28 was played on a snowy field at War Memorial Stadium and Boston won 26–8, ending Buffalo's season.

== Personnel ==
=== Staff ===
1963 Buffalo Bills staff
Front office: President/Majority Owner – Ralph Wilson; Vice-president/minority owner – Pat McGroder; Head coach: Head coach – Lou Saban; Offensive coaches: Running backs/wide receivers – John Mazur; Offensive line – Herman Ball	Defensive coaches: Defensive line – Jerry Smith; Linebackers/Defensive Backs – Joe Collier

== Season summary ==
The Bills were favored by many to win the AFL's Eastern division before the season, but for the second consecutive season, the Bills had a terrible start to the year, winless in their first four games, with an 0–3–1 record. The Bills rallied to win five of their next six games before going 2–2 in the final four weeks.

Quarterback Jack Kemp was the opening day starter for the first time after an abbreviated 1962 season. By Week Four, however, he was splitting time with rookie Daryle Lamonica. During the middle of the Bills' season (other than two Lamonica starts in Weeks 13 and 14), Kemp established himself as the team's leader and full-time passer. Kemp was conservative, but effective, with only 5.2% of his passes being intercepted.

Wide receivers Elbert Dubenion (53 catches for 959 yards) and Bill Miller (69 for 860) were Kemp's biggest targets in 1963, with Cookie Gilchrist leading the team with 979 rushing yards, third in the league. Gilchrist's 12 rushing touchdowns led the AFL, as did his 256 total touches. Gilchrist set a then-record for yards in a game, with 243 in a blowout win against the Jets in Week Fourteen.

Halfback Wray Carlton was sidelined for most of the season with an injury, forcing Gilchrist to shoulder most of the load.

Going into the final week of the season, the Bills were 6–5–1, whereas the division-leading Patriots were 7–5–1: a Patriots win or a Bills loss would eliminate them. Instead, the Patriots were blown out 35–3 at defending champion Kansas City, and the Bills rallied in the fourth quarter to defeat the Jets in the final sporting event played at the Polo Grounds. The Bills and Patriots, now both 7–6–1, had to play a tiebreaker playoff to determine who would face the Western Division champion Chargers (11–3) in the AFL championship game.

On a freezing day and snowy field in Buffalo, the Bills trailed 16–0 at halftime. Buffalo's only score was a 93-yard pass from Daryle Lamonica to Elbert Dubenion in the third quarter, with a successful two-point conversion to cut the lead in half. The Patriots tacked on another ten unanswered points to win 26–8, and advanced to the AFL championship game against the San Diego Chargers (11–3) of the Western division, who had the week off. (Boston was demolished by San Diego, 51–10).

== Season schedule ==
Week	Date	Opponent	Result	Record	Venue	Attendance	Recap
1	September 8	at San Diego Chargers	**L** 10–14	0–1	Balboa Stadium	22,344	Recap
2	September 15	at Oakland Raiders	**L** 17–35	0–2	Frank Youell Field	17,568	Recap
3	September 22	Kansas City Chiefs	**T** 27–27	0–2–1	War Memorial Stadium	33,487	Recap
4	September 28	**Houston Oilers**	**L** 20–31	0–3–1	War Memorial Stadium	32,340	Recap
5	October 5	Oakland Raiders	**W** 12–0	1–3–1	War Memorial Stadium	24,486	Recap
6	October 13	at Kansas City Chiefs	**W** 35–26	2–3–1	Municipal Stadium	25,519	Recap
7	October 20	at **Houston Oilers**	**L** 14–28	2–4–1	Jeppesen Stadium	23,948	Recap
8	October 26	**Boston Patriots**	**W** 28–21	3–4–1	War Memorial Stadium	27,243	Recap
9	November 3	at Denver Broncos	**W** 30–28	4–4–1	Bears Stadium	19,424	Recap
10	November 9	Denver Broncos	**W** 27–17	5–4–1	War Memorial Stadium	30,989	Recap
11	November 17	San Diego Chargers	**L** 13–23	5–5–1	War Memorial Stadium	38,592	Recap
AFL games postponed to December 22
12	December 1	at **Boston Patriots**	**L** 7–17	5–6–1	Fenway Park	16,981	Recap
13	December 8	**New York Jets**	**W** 45–14	6–6–1	War Memorial Stadium	20,222	Recap
14	December 14	at **New York Jets**	**W** 19–10	7–6–1	Polo Grounds	6,526	Recap
15	Bye week, (originally December 1)						
Note: Intra-division opponents are in **bold** text.

== Standings ==
AFL Eastern Division
	W	L	T	PCT	DIV	PF	PA	STK
Boston Patriots	7	6	1	.538	4–2	327	257	L1
Buffalo Bills	7	6	1	.538	3–3	304	291	W2
Houston Oilers	6	8	0	.429	3–3	302	372	L4
New York Jets	5	8	1	.385	2–4	249	399	L3

Note: Tie games were not officially counted in the standings in the AFL.

== Postseason ==
Round	Date	Opponent	Result	Venue	Attendance	Game recap
Division	December 28	Boston Patriots	L 8–26	War Memorial Stadium	33,044	Recap

=== Final roster ===
1963 Buffalo Bills roster
Quarterbacks: 15 Jack Kemp; 12 Daryle Lamonica P; Running backs: 27 Glenn Bass; 34 Cookie Gilchrist; 25 Jesse Murdock; 40 Ed Rutkowski; Wide receivers: 44 Elbert Dubenion; 80 Charley Ferguson; 81 Bill Miller; Tight ends: 84 Ernie Warlick	Offensive linemen: 77 Stew Barber T; 51 Dave Behrman T/C; 60 Al Bemiller C; 60 Tom Day G; 75 Ken Rice T/DE; 66 Billy Shaw G; Defensive linemen: 78 Jim Dunaway DT; 72 Ron McDole DE; 70 Tom Sestak DT; 82 Mack Yoho DE/K; 76 Sid Youngelman DE/DT	Linebackers: 54 Harry Jacobs MLB; 55 Marv Matuszak MLB/OLB; 57 Herb Paterra OLB; 58 Mike Stratton OLB; 85 John Tracey OLB; Defensive backs: 46 Ray Abruzzese SS; 43 Carl Charon FS; 24 Booker Edgerson CB; 20 Hank Rivera CB; 26 George Saimes FS/RB; 23 Gene Sykes SS; 47 Willie West CB	Reserve list: 30 Wray Carlton RB (IR); 73 George Flint G (IR); 79 Dick Hudson T (IR); 45 Roger Kochman RB (IR)
*Note: rookies in italics
