= Jesse Murdock =

American football player (1938–1965)

No. 25
- Position: Running back

Personal information
- Born: September 17, 1938; Oakland, California, U.S.
- Died: September 25, 1965 (aged 27); Richmond, California, U.S.
- Listed height: 6 ft 2 in (1.88 m)
- Listed weight: 203 lb (92 kg)

Career information
- High school: Alameda (CA)
- College: California Western

Career history
- Oakland Raiders (1963); Buffalo Bills (1963)

Career statistics
- Games played: 7
- Stats at Pro Football Reference

Jesse Murdock Jr. (September 17, 1938 – September 25, 1965) was an American collegiate and Professional Football player. After graduating from California Western University he served in the United States Marine Corps (1958 to 1961), then tried out for the American Football League's San Diego Chargers in 1963. After being released by the Chargers' Sid Gillman during training camp, he played for the AFL's Oakland Raiders and Buffalo Bills in the 1963 AFL season.

Murdock was killed in an automobile accident on September 25, 1965, and was buried with full military honors at the Golden Gate National Cemetery, San Bruno, California.

== See also ==
- List of American Football League players
