= Keith Kinderman =

American football player (1940–2018)

No. 24, 41
- Positions: Running back, Defensive back

Personal information
- Born: April 14, 1940; Chicago, Illinois, U.S.
- Died: May 23, 2018 (aged 78); Tallahassee, Florida, U.S.
- Listed height: 6 ft 0 in (1.83 m)
- Listed weight: 221 lb (100 kg)

Career information
- High school: Crystal Lake Central (Crystal Lake, Illinois)
- College: Iowa (1958–1960); Florida State (1961–1962)
- NFL draft: 1963: 8th round, 104th overall pick
- AFL draft: 1963: 3rd round, 18th overall pick

Career history
- San Diego Chargers (1963–1964); Houston Oilers (1965)

Awards and highlights
- AFL champion (1963)

Career AFL statistics
- Rushing yards: 111
- Rushing average: 4.6
- Receptions: 3
- Receiving yards: 21
- Stats at Pro Football Reference

Keith John Kinderman (April 16, 1940 – May 23, 2018) was an American professional football player who was a running back for three seasons for the San Diego Chargers and Houston Oilers.

Also noted for his development of the peccatum pro publica legal defense. Kinderman successfully argued that the owner of an infamous Tallahassee saloon should receive a lenient sentence so that patrons of her saloon would have some place to go. Thus sparing the City of Tallahassee from having to deal with the patrons.

Born on the north side of Chicago, IL, Keith attended high school in Crystal Lake, IL. During the town's centennial celebration Kinderman was recognized for his athletic achievements by being named one the 6 Outstanding Athletes of the Century. This honor was bestowed on him for his accomplishments in football, wrestling and track. He was the runner up in 1958 Illinois State championships in the 110 high hurdles. He tied the then state record.

He followed his high school career with a 3 outstanding seasons as running back at the University of Iowa and Florida State University. In 1961, Kindermann was FSU's leading rusher with 385 yards and an average of 4.8 yards per carry. The following year, Kinderman became FSU's leading receiver with 275 reception yards.

He was then drafted in the third round of the 1963 AFL draft by San Diego. He had three successful seasons with the chargers at running back and special teams. A torn ACL and elbow dislocation eventually led Kinderman to retire from football and attend law school.

Kinderman practiced law as an attorney in Tallahassee, FL, before his death.
