= Bo Dickinson =

American football player (born 1935)

No. 85, 32, 35, 23
- Positions: Running back, fullback

Personal information
- Born: July 18, 1935; Hattiesburg, Mississippi, U.S.
- Died: November 6, 2012 (aged 77); Hattiesburg, Mississippi, U.S.
- Listed height: 6 ft 2 in (1.88 m)
- Listed weight: 220 lb (100 kg)

Career information
- High school: Hattiesburg
- College: Southern Miss (1953, 1956–1957)
- NFL draft: 1957: 6th round, 72nd overall pick

Career history
- Montreal Alouettes (1958); Pittsburgh Steelers (1959)*; Dallas Texans (1960-1961); Denver Broncos (1962-1963); Houston Oilers (1963); Oakland Raiders (1964)
- * Offseason or practice squad member only

Career NFL/AFL statistics
- Rushing yards: 693
- Rushing average: 3.7
- Receptions: 86
- Receiving yards: 886
- Total touchdowns: 11
- Stats at Pro Football Reference

Richard Lee "Bo" Dickinson (July 18, 1935 – November 6, 2012) was an American professional football running back who played six seasons in the American Football League (AFL).

Dickinson was born in Hattiesburg, Mississippi, the son of Richard Henry Dickinson and Mae Dickinson. He played baseball in high school, and attended the University of Southern Mississippi from 1953 to 1957, with an interruption to serve in the United States Army.

Dickinson was a sixth round selection (72nd overall pick) out of University of Southern Mississippi by the Chicago Bears of the National Football League (NFL) in the 1957 NFL draft. However, he would play for the Montreal Alouettes (1958) of the Canadian Football League (CFL), the Dallas Texans (1960–1961), the Denver Broncos (1962–1963), the Houston Oilers (1963), and the Oakland Raiders (1964) of the AFL.

Dickinson was married to Vandy Dickinson and had children. He died in Hattiesburg in 2012, at the age of 77.
