= Clyde Washington =

American football player (1938–1974)

No. 31, 42
- Positions: Cornerback, punter

Personal information
- Born: March 21, 1938; Carlisle, Pennsylvania, U.S.
- Died: December 29, 1974 (aged 36); Carlisle, Pennsylvania, U.S.
- Listed height: 6 ft 1 in (1.85 m)
- Listed weight: 197 lb (89 kg)

Career information
- High school: Carlisle
- College: Purdue
- NFL draft: 1960: 10th round, 116th overall pick

Career history

Playing
- Cleveland Browns (1960)*; Boston Patriots (1960–1961); Boston Sweepers (1963); New York Jets (1963–1965)
- * Offseason or practice squad member only

Coaching
- Bridgeport Jets (1968-1969) Assistant coach

Career NFL statistics
- Interceptions: 9
- Punts: 17
- Punting yards: 539
- Longest punt: 48
- Stats at Pro Football Reference

Clyde George Washington (March 21, 1938 – December 29, 1974) was a professional American football cornerback in the American Football League (AFL). After playing college football for Purdue, Washington was drafted by the Cleveland Browns in the 10th round (116th overall) of the 1960 National Football League draft but played five seasons for the AFL's Boston Patriots (1960–1961) and New York Jets (1963–1965).
