= George Blair (American football) =

American football player (born 1938)

No. 39
- Positions: Defensive back, placekicker

Personal information
- Born: May 10, 1938 (age 88); Pascagoula, Mississippi, U.S.
- Listed height: 5 ft 11 in (1.80 m)
- Listed weight: 195 lb (88 kg)

Career information
- High school: Pascagoula (MS)
- College: Ole Miss
- NFL draft: 1960: 6th round, 72nd overall pick
- AFL draft: 1960

Career history
- San Diego Chargers (1961-1964)

Awards and highlights
- AFL All-Star (1961); AFL champion (1963)

Career AFL statistics
- Field goal attempts/makes: 80 / 50
- Field goal %: 62.5
- Extra points: 135 / 122
- Stats at Pro Football Reference

George Leroy Blair (born May 10, 1938) is an American former professional football player who was a defensive back and kicker for the San Diego Chargers of the American Football League (AFL). He played college football as a halfback for the Ole Miss Rebels, playing in the 1958 Gator Bowl (Florida), and the 1959 Sugar Bowl (LSU), and the 1960 Sugar Bowl (Rice). He also played in the 1961 Senior Bowl at Mobile and the College All-Star Game in Chicago against the Philadelphia Eagles after his senior year at Ole Miss. Drafted by the AFL's Chargers as a kicker, he played for the four seasons (1961 - 1964) and won an AFL championship with them in 1963.

== See also ==
- List of American Football League players
