= John McCormick (American football) =

American football player (1937–2013)

No. 15, 10, 11
- Positions: Quarterback, Punter

Personal information
- Born: May 26, 1937; Boston, Massachusetts, U.S.
- Died: November 12, 2013 (aged 76); Lakewood, Colorado, U.S.
- Listed height: 6 ft 1 in (1.85 m)
- Listed weight: 208 lb (94 kg)

Career information
- High school: Belmont (Belmont, Massachusetts)
- College: Boston College (1955); UMass (1959–1961)
- NFL draft: 1962: undrafted

Career history
- Minnesota Vikings (1962); Denver Broncos (1963–1968)

Career NFL/AFL statistics
- Passing attempts: 555
- Passing completions: 214
- Completion percentage: 38.6%
- TD–INT: 17–38
- Passing yards: 2,895
- Passer rating: 37.6
- Stats at Pro Football Reference

John Joseph McCormick Jr. (May 26, 1937 – November 12, 2013) was an American professional football player who played quarterback and punter for the Minnesota Vikings and Denver Broncos from 1962 to 1968.

McCormick died on November 12, 2013, in Lakewood, Colorado, at the age of 76.
