= Gene Heeter =

American football player (born 1941)

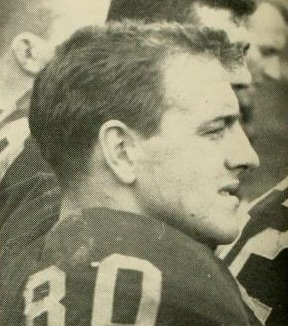
- Heeter from The Monticola, 1963

No. 85
- Position: Tight end

Personal information
- Born: April 19, 1941 (age 85); Windber, Pennsylvania, U.S.
- Listed height: 6 ft 4 in (1.93 m)
- Listed weight: 230 lb (104 kg)

Career information
- College: West Virginia
- AFL draft: 1963: 8th round, 58th overall pick

Career history
- New York Jets (1963–1965)
- Stats at Pro Football Reference

Eugene Elwood Heeter (born April 19, 1941) is an American former professional football player who was a tight end for the New York Jets of the American Football League (AFL). He played college football for the West Virginia Mountaineers before playing for the Jets from 1963 through 1965. On September 12, 1964, he scored the first-ever touchdown in Flushing's Shea Stadium , catching a 16-yard pass from Dick Wood against the Denver Broncos. Heeter was inducted into the Suffolk Sports Hall of Fame on Long Island in the Football Category with the Class of 2016.

== See also ==
- Other American Football League players
