= Eldon Danenhauer =

American football player (1935–2021)

No. 72, 75
- Position: Offensive tackle

Personal information
- Born: October 4, 1935; Clay Center, Kansas
- Died: June 23, 2021 (aged 85); Topeka, Kansas
- Listed height: 6 ft 5 in (1.96 m)
- Listed weight: 245 lb (111 kg)

Career information
- High school: Concordia (KS)
- College: Pittsburg State
- AFL draft: 1960

Career history
- Denver Broncos (1960–1965)

Awards and highlights
- 2× AFL All-Star (1962, 1965)
- Stats at Pro Football Reference

Eldon Danenhauer (October 4, 1935 – June 23, 2021) was an American football offensive tackle. He played college football at the Pittsburg State University in Pittsburg, Kansas, and professionally in the American Football League (NFL) with the Denver Broncos from 1960 through 1965. He was an AFL All-Star in 1962 and 1965.

He died on June 23, 2021, in Topeka, Kansas, at age 85.

== See also ==
- List of American Football League players
