= Logan Mankins =

American football player (born 1982)

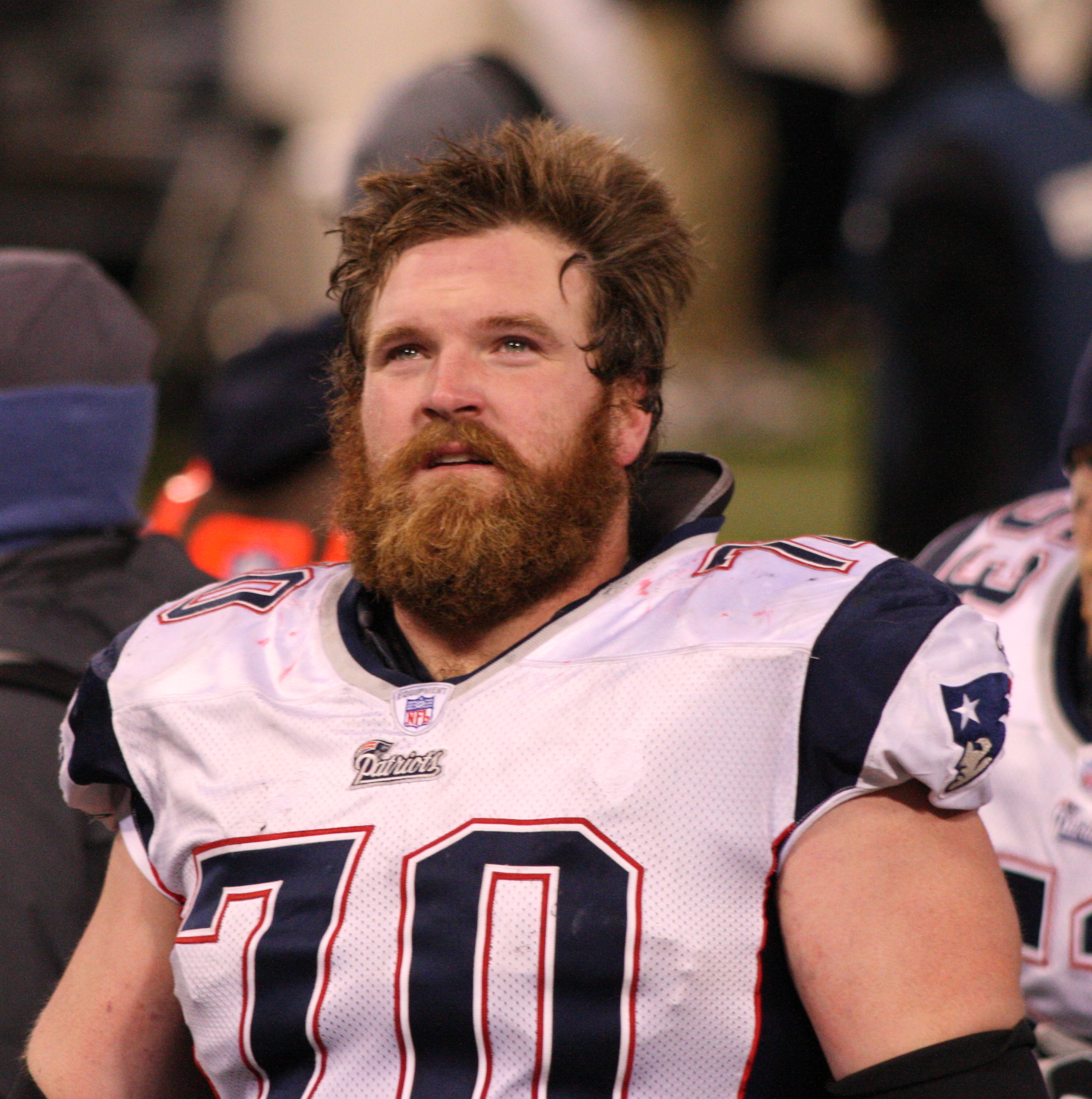
- Mankins with the New England Patriots in 2007

No. 70
- Position: Guard

Personal information
- Born: March 10, 1982 (age 44); Catheys Valley, California, U.S.
- Listed height: 6 ft 4 in (1.93 m)
- Listed weight: 308 lb (140 kg)

Career information
- High school: Mariposa County (Mariposa, California)
- College: Fresno State (2000–2004)
- NFL draft: 2005: 1st round, 32nd overall pick

Career history
- New England Patriots (2005–2013); Tampa Bay Buccaneers (2014–2015)

Awards and highlights
- First-team All-Pro (2010); 5× Second-team All-Pro (2007, 2009, 2011–2013); 7× Pro Bowl (2007, 2009–2013, 2015); NFL 2010s All-Decade Team; New England Patriots All-2000s Team; New England Patriots All-2010s Team; New England Patriots 50th Anniversary Team; New England Patriots All-Dynasty Team; PFWA All-Rookie Team (2005); Second-team All-American (2004); First-team All-WAC (2004); Madden Most Valuable Protectors Award (2010)

Career NFL statistics
- Games played: 161
- Games started: 161
- Fumble recoveries: 1
- Stats at Pro Football Reference

Logan Lee Mankins (born March 10, 1982) is an American former professional football player who was a guard for 11 seasons in the National Football League (NFL), primarily with the New England Patriots. After playing college football for the Fresno State Bulldogs, he was selected by the Patriots in the first round of the 2005 NFL draft. He spent his final two seasons with the Tampa Bay Buccaneers. Selected to seven Pro Bowls and named a first-team All-Pro twice, Mankins was considered a premier guard in his 11 seasons in the NFL, and was also named to the NFL 2010s All-Decade Team.

Despite his stature as one of the best offensive linemen throughout the Patriots' dynasty, his tenure with the Patriots (2005–2013) coincided with the entire drought between the Patriots first three Super Bowl wins (2001, 2003, 2004) and their last three wins (2014, 2016, 2018). Mankins appeared in two Super Bowls (2007 and 2011), but lost twice.

== Early life ==
Mankins is from Catheys Valley, California. He attended Mariposa High School in Mariposa, California, where he was an All-League performer and the team MVP.

== College career ==
After graduating from high school, he attended California State University, Fresno, where he played for the Fresno State Bulldogs football team. He redshirted in his first season in 2000. As a freshman in 2001, he started all 14 games at left tackle, blocking for quarterback David Carr and allowing only two sacks. He was named to the first-team Freshman All-American team by the Sporting News. In 2002, he again started all 14 games and was on the Outland Trophy watch list. As a junior in 2003, Mankins tore his ACL in preseason practices after a vicious hit from Juan Carrasquillo and missed the season. In his final season in 2004, Mankins returned to start every game at left tackle and did not allow a sack or pressure on the season. He was a first-team All-Western Athletic Conference selection and recorded a school record 82 knockdown blocks on the season. He also was the first offensive lineman in school history to win the team's MVP award.

== Professional career ==
=== Pre-draft measurables ===
Pre-draft measurables
Height	Weight	Arm length	Hand span	40-yard dash	10-yard split	20-yard split	20-yard shuttle	Three-cone drill	Vertical jump	Broad jump	Bench press
6 ft 4 1/8 in (1.93 m)	307 lb (139 kg)	33 3/8 in (0.85 m)	11 3/8 in (0.29 m)	5.14 s	1.84 s	3.02 s	4.44 s	7.52 s	31.5 in (0.80 m)	7 ft 11 in (2.41 m)	21 reps
All values from NFL Scouting Combine

=== New England Patriots ===
==== 2005–06 ====
Mankins was selected with the final pick of the first round, 32nd overall, in the 2005 NFL draft by the New England Patriots. Despite playing his entire collegiate career as a tackle, Mankins was moved to left guard by the Patriots, where he immediately stepped into the starting lineup in place of Joe Andruzzi, who departed in free agency. Mankins started all 16 games for the Patriots in 2005. In an October 16 loss to the Denver Broncos, Mankins was ejected after striking Broncos defensive lineman Ebenezer Ekuban below the belt after a missed field goal. He would go on to be named to Pro Football Weekly's 2005 All-Rookie team.

In 2006, Mankins again started all 16 games for the Patriots. He scored his first NFL touchdown in the AFC Championship Game against the Indianapolis Colts when he recovered a Laurence Maroney fumble in the end zone. (Later in that same game, Colts center Jeff Saturday also recovered a fumble for a touchdown, making that game the first playoff game in NFL history in which two offensive linemen scored touchdowns).

==== 2007–09 ====
2007 saw Mankins start all 16 games, allowing only one sack. Due to his performance, Mankins was named as a starting guard in the 2008 Pro Bowl and a second-team All-Pro selection.

For the fourth straight season, Mankins started all 16 games at left guard for the Patriots in 2008. After the loss of starting quarterback Tom Brady, Mankins helped the team's running backs to compile a total of 2,278 yards, a team's best since 1985.

Mankins was named to the Patriots' 50th anniversary team in August 2009. He continued with his streak of consecutive starts, playing in every game for the Patriots again and protecting Brady to just 16 sacks (a career best). At the end of the 2009 season, Mankins was selected as a starter to his second Pro Bowl and became just the second guard, after John Hannah, in Patriots history to do so.

==== 2010 season ====
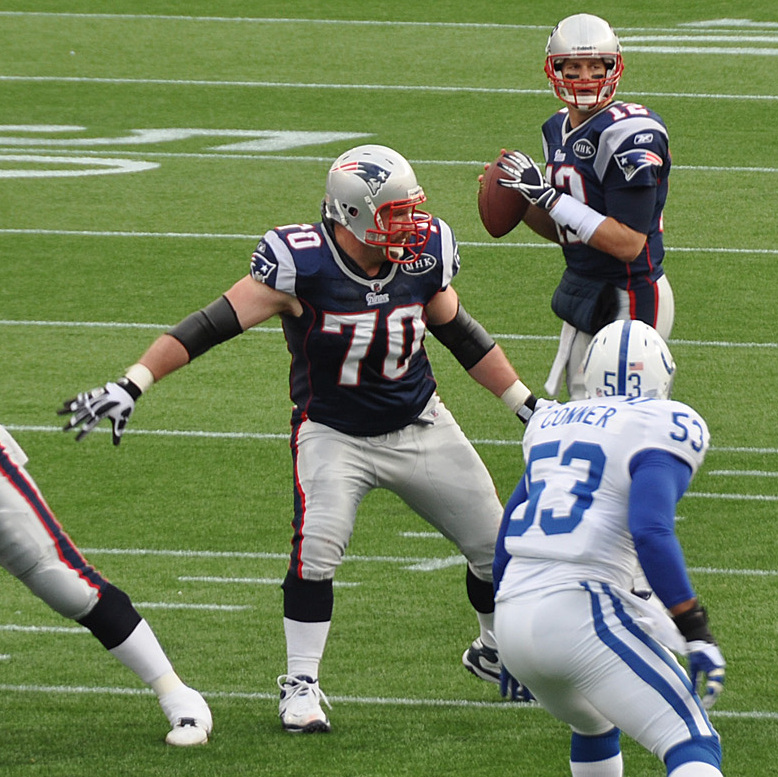
Mankins (70) blocking for quarterback Tom Brady (12)

Following the 2009 season, Mankins became a restricted free agent under the terms of the NFL-NFLPA collective bargaining agreement, which entered its final, uncapped year; Mankins otherwise would have been an unrestricted free agent in a normal season. The Patriots tendered at the highest possible level for a restricted free agent, $3.26 million, which have required any team signing Mankins in the restricted free agent signing period, which ended on April 15, 2010, to surrender first- and third-round draft selections to the Patriots. On June 15, with Mankins yet to sign his tender, the Patriots were able to lower Mankins' tender amount to 110% of his prior year salary, or $1.54 million. The Patriots did so, and Mankins, who was looking for a long-term contract, reacted by publicly asking for a trade.

He did not attend the Patriots' mandatory June minicamp, which he was not required to attend as he was not under contract at the time. Mankins remained unsigned through the team's training camp, preseason, and the start of the regular season. Mankins reported to the Patriots and signed his tender on November 2, in advance of the team's Week 9 game against the Cleveland Browns. He did not have to report until Week 12 in order to be on the roster for the necessary six games to earn his sixth accrued season of free agency credit. The NFL granted the Patriots a two-game roster exemption for Mankins upon his reporting. However, the Patriots activated Mankins on November 6, before using either game of the exemption.

Mankins started the final nine games of the season for the Patriots. For the second straight season, Mankins was elected as a starter to the Pro Bowl. He was ranked 39th by his fellow players on the NFL Top 100 Players of 2011.

==== 2011–2013 ====
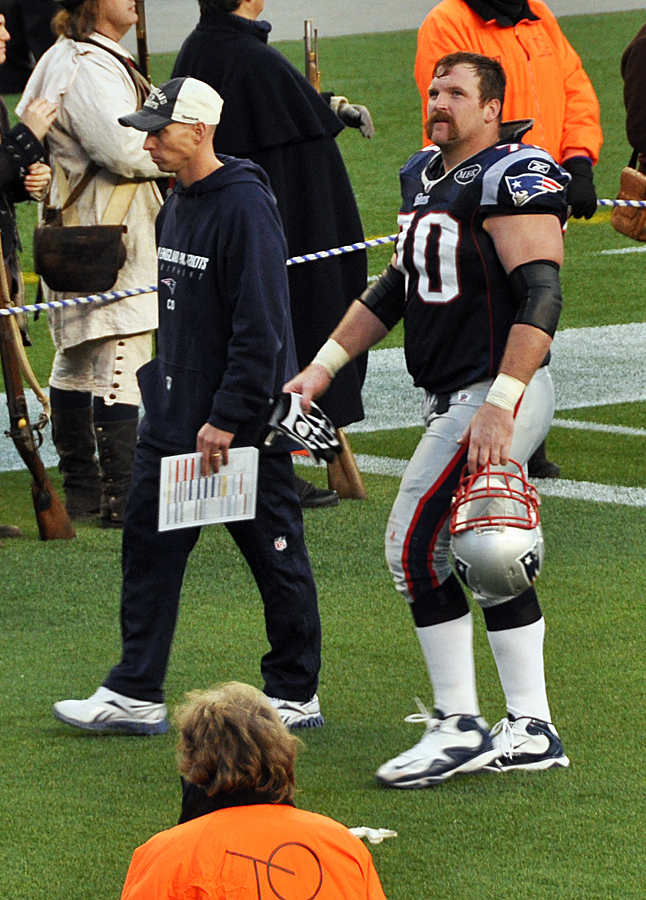
Mankins in December 2011

On February 14, 2011, the Patriots assigned Mankins the franchise tag.

Late in negotiations to complete a new NFL/NFLPA Collective Bargaining Agreement came reports that Mankins and several other players were demanding $10 million apiece or immediate granting of free agency status before they would sign off on settlement of a lawsuit against the NFL as part of a new CBA. It was not the first time, as in the previous CBA agreement Reggie White was exempt and was able to join free agency as part of the agreement.

On July 26, 2011, it was announced that Mankins would sign his franchise tender, worth just over $10 million, for the 2011–2012 season, and report to Patriots training camp on time. He reported on July 27.

On August 10, 2011, Mankins signed a 6-year deal, which at the time made him the highest paid guard in the league.

During the first Patriots game of the 2011 season, Mankins tore the ACL in his right knee. Despite this he continued the season, starting a total of 15 games in the 2011 season. He is one of the only players known to have played a season with a torn ACL and reportedly kept the injury to himself, not reporting it. He only became aware of how serious the injury was after he tore the MCL in his left knee, during the divisional round playoff game vs the Denver Broncos. Despite both ACL and MCL tears in separate knees Mankins still went on to play in Super Bowl XLVI vs the New York Giants.

In 2013, Mankins was fined $10,000 for clipping as he blocked Pittsburgh Steeler nose tackle Steve McLendon. Mankins was penalized on the play which occurred in the first quarter. The play was a run by running back Stevan Ridley, which went for no gain.

=== Tampa Bay Buccaneers ===
Mankins was traded to the Tampa Bay Buccaneers on August 26, 2014, for tight end Tim Wright and a fourth round draft pick in the 2015 NFL draft after refusing to take a pay cut.

==== 2014 ====
The trade was a move by both the new head coach Lovie Smith and new general manager Jason Licht to fill the void left by Pro Bowl guard Davin Joseph, who was released along with all other members of the offensive line from 2013 season.

==== 2015 ====
After anchoring an offensive line that produced the fifth-best offense that season, Mankins was voted as a Pro Bowl alternate, his seventh appearance in the game. Shortly after the season, Mankins retired on March 7, 2016.

== Personal life ==
Mankins' son was a high school football player at Bishop Feehan High School, where his younger son plays football as well. He now is a defensive lineman with University of Rhode Island's football team. Mankins' daughter also played softball at Bentley University.
