= Roman Phifer =

American football player, coach, and executive (born 1968)

Denver Broncos
- Title: Senior personnel executive

Personal information
- Born: March 5, 1968 (age 58); Plattsburgh, New York, U.S.
- Listed height: 6 ft 2 in (1.88 m)
- Listed weight: 248 lb (112 kg)

Career information
- Position: Linebacker (No. 58, 56, 95, 55)
- High school: South Mecklenburg (Charlotte, North Carolina)
- College: UCLA (1986–1990)
- NFL draft: 1991: 2nd round, 31st overall pick

Career history

Playing
- Los Angeles / St. Louis Rams (1991–1998); New York Jets (1999–2000); New England Patriots (2001–2004); New York Giants (2005)

Coaching
- Denver Broncos (2009–2010) Assistant linebackers coach

Operations
- UCLA (2016–2017) Director of player development; Detroit Lions (2018–2020) Area scout; Denver Broncos (2021–present) Senior personnel executive

Awards and highlights
- 3× Super Bowl champion (XXXVI, XXXVIII, XXXIX); New England Patriots All-2000s Team; New England Patriots All-Dynasty Team; First-team All-Pac-10 (1990)

Career NFL statistics
- Tackles: 1,136
- Sacks: 29
- Interceptions: 11
- Stats at Pro Football Reference

Roman Zubinsky Phifer (born March 5, 1968) is an American professional football executive and former linebacker who is a senior personnel executive for the Denver Broncos of the National Football League (NFL).

During his 15 year playing career, Phifer played for the New England Patriots, Los Angeles/St. Louis Rams, New York Jets, and New York Giants. He played in 211 NFL games and made 1134 tackles, 882 were solo, 252 assisted, 29 sacks, and 11 interceptions and was a four-time Pro Bowl Alternate. Phifer played football and majored in history at the University of California Los Angeles and is a graduate of South Mecklenburg High School in Charlotte, North Carolina.

Phifer has also worked as a film producer, producing the NFL-focused documentary Blood Equity.

== Early life ==
Phifer was a two-time All-Conference selection, earning All-County and Charlotte Post Athlete of the Year honors as a senior at South Mecklenburg High School in Charlotte, North Carolina. He was a three-year letterman in football and basketball and also competed in track and field in the high jump (6′6″) and triple jump (44′8″).

== College career ==
As a senior at UCLA, Phifer totaled 71 tackles (9 for a loss) 3 interceptions and 3 sacks and was named an honorable mention All-America. He missed the 1989 season due to an off-field beating incident along with teammate Damion Lyons. Their prior year, 1988, Phifer was primarily a special teams player, recorded 14 tackles (seven unassisted) on defense. As a Sophomore in 1987 he recorded 27 tackles, including one for a loss. He redshirted his freshman year of 1986.

== Professional career ==
Pre-draft measurables
Height	Weight	Arm length	Hand span	40-yard dash	10-yard split	20-yard split	20-yard shuttle	Vertical jump	Broad jump	Bench press
6 ft 1 7/8 in (1.88 m)	227 lb (103 kg)	33 1/2 in (0.85 m)	8 3/4 in (0.22 m)	4.71 s	1.70 s	2.74 s	4.31 s	36.5 in (0.93 m)	10 ft 0 in (3.05 m)	19 reps
All values from NFL Combine

Phifer bench pressed 380 pounds. Scouts said, "An underrated outside linebacker who came on strong his senior year. Very good open field tackler with legitimate speed and cover ability, Uses his quickness in rushing the passer."

=== Los Angeles / St. Louis Rams ===
He was drafted in the 2nd round (31st overall pick) in the 1991 NFL draft by the Rams out of UCLA. While at UCLA, one of his roommates was the late Eric Turner. On July 17, 1991, Phifer signed a 3-year $1.5 million contract with the Rams, including a $450,000 signing bonus. He started as a rookie in 1991 until an ankle injury ended his season. He totaled 24 tackles on the season (21 solo).

Phifer was a starter for the Rams from 1992 to 1998. In 1992, Phifer made 66 tackles (51 solo) and defensed six passes. Phifer led the Rams in tackles in 1993 from his "Will'" or outside linebacker position. In the summer of 1994, the restricted free agent Phifer signed a tender-offer of $649,000. However, since Phifer and his agent felt there were no negotiations, he was reluctant to sign a further deal. Phifer had another solid season in 1994. However, during the confusion of the Rams moving from Los Angeles to St. Louis, Phifer signed a four-year, $8.5 million contract that included a $2.5 million signing bonus. He was the Rams' Ed Block Courage Award winner in 1995. He was a Pro Bowl alternate in 1995 and led the Rams that season with 125 tackles, along with 3 sacks, 3 interceptions, one forced fumble, and one fumble recovery. He again led the Rams in tackles in 1996 with 122, when he was again voted a Pro Bowl alternate.

In his years with the Rams, he played under several different defensive coordinators. Under his first coach, the Rams featured the Chicago Bears-style "46" defense that was brought in by recent Tennessee Titans Head coach Jeff Fisher. The next season, it changed from a less pressure defense to more of a standard NFL defense. In 1995, that changed with a new defensive coordinator who introduced the Rams "Jet" defense, where the linemen were in pass rush mode at all times. A couple of years later, he began to play in Bud Carson's multiple defenses where Roman was asked to rush the passer more. In the "Jet" defense, he was often the only linebacker on the field and was asked to cover running backs in coverage and still stop running plays. It was under Carson's defense that Phifer would play the equivalent of a safety on one play, the equivalent of a defensive end on another play, a run-stuffing linebacker on another play, and a pass-cover linebacker as yet a fourth way to play defense. In 1998, he had a career-high 6.5 sacks and 71 tackles with an interception, a forced fumble, and a fumble recovery on an improving Rams defense, with his career high in sacks being the result of playing standup defensive end some of the snaps.

=== New York Jets ===
The Rams stated they wanted to keep Phifer but reportedly acted too slow to sign Phifer and on March 6, 1999, he signed a 3-year $8.9 million contract with the New York Jets. Less than six days later the Rams signed Patriot linebacker Todd Collins to replace Phifer. Phifer played two seasons for the Jets getting 4.5 sacks, 3 forced fumbles in 1999 along with 2 interceptions and 50 tackles. In 2000, he had 45 tackles and 4 sacks. After the 2000 season the Jets released Phifer in an effort to "revamp the linebacking corps" into a younger group and also to switch from a 3-4 defense to a 4–3, causing Phifer to not be able to earn the approximately $2.5 million due in 2001 of his 3-year contract signed in 1999.

=== New England Patriots ===
The New England Patriots signed Phifer to a 1-year veteran minimum contract of $520,000. Phifer started 16 games and recorded 93 tackles for the 2001 Super Bowl Champion Patriots. He also had 2 sacks, defensed 5 passes, intercepted a pass, forced 2 fumbles and recovered 2 fumbles. Even more he provided leadership and was essential to the Patriots success. "Roman Phifer is the MVP of the season", said cornerback Terrell Buckley, "He may be overlooked, and he would never campaign for the honor but he deserves it."

Phifer making the Super Bowl was one of the side-show stories of Super Bowl week, with the St. Louis and the Boston-area papers doing feature stories on Phifer's Rams connection and now playing them in the "big game." He helped the Patriots to win Super Bowl XXXVI and was rewarded on the off season. On June 21, 2002, the Patriots offered Phifer a 3-year $4.5 million contract with $1.8 million in signing bonuses. In 2002, Phifer made 109 tackles and started 14 games and was again an alternate to the Pro Bowl.

In 2003, he had 100 tackles and batted away 5 passes as the Patriots won Super Bowl XXXVIII. In the Super Bowl, Phifer made 5 tackles and nearly intercepted a Jake Delhome pass, but it would have been nullified due to a roughing call on tackle Richard Seymour. After the season, Phifer was a Pro Bowl Alternate for the fourth time in his career.

The 2004 season saw Phifer play a backup role in the Patriot defense. He struggled with an injured calf and his role had diminished as well. He ended the season with 40 tackles, a sack, and interception, a fumble recovery and knocked down two passes as the Patriots won Super Bowl XXXIX in Jacksonville, Florida. Phifer's contract expired at the end of the season. He was released on February 27, 2005.

=== New York Giants ===
He had a short stint with the New York Giants in 2005, signing a veteran-minimum contract that yielded him approximately $150,000 for two weeks work. He came in for one last chance and to bring leadership to the Giants, perhaps similar to what he brought to the Patriots in his 2001 season.

In his career, he played in 211 games, had 1,134 tackles, 882 solo, 252 assisted, 29 sacks, and 11 interceptions.

=== NFL statistics ===
Year	Team	Games	Combined tackles	Tackles	Assisted tackles	Sacks	Forced fumbles	Fumble recoveries	Fumble return yards	Interceptions	Interception return yards	Yards per interception return	Longest interception return	Interceptions returned for touchdown	Passes defended
1991	LOS	12	24	21	3	2.0	1	0	0	0	0	0	0	0	0
1992	LOS	16	66	51	15	0.0	1	2	0	1	3	3	3	0	6
1993	LOS	16	116	104	12	0.0	0	2	0	0	0	0	0	0	7
1994	LOS	16	96	79	17	1.5	1	0	0	2	7	4	7	0	7
1995	STL	16	114	86	28	3.0	1	0	0	3	52	17	25	0	12
1996	STL	15	124	104	20	1.5	0	0	0	0	0	0	0	0	5
1997	STL	16	75	57	18	2.0	0	0	0	0	0	0	0	0	6
1998	STL	13	71	58	13	6.5	1	0	0	1	41	41	41	0	3
1999	NYJ	16	48	33	15	4.5	3	0	0	2	20	10	16	0	5
2000	NYJ	16	44	31	13	4.0	1	0	0	0	0	0	0	0	1
2001	NE	16	91	70	21	2.0	2	2	0	1	14	14	14	0	5
2002	NE	14	107	67	40	0.5	2	1	0	0	0	0	0	0	2
2003	NE	16	99	66	33	0.0	2	0	0	0	0	0	0	0	5
2004	NE	13	40	30	10	1.5	0	1	0	1	26	26	26	0	2
Career		211	1,115	857	258	29.0	15	8	0	11	163	15	41	0	66

== Coaching career ==
=== Denver Broncos ===
On February 9, 2009, Phifer was hired as the assistant linebackers coach for the Denver Broncos, assisting linebackers coach Don Martindale. Phifer helped outside linebacker Elvis Dumervil achieve a league-leading and franchise record 17 sacks on the season and Pro Bowl berth, as well as making inside linebacker D.J. Williams a Pro Bowl alternate after ranking 11th in the league with a team-high 122 tackles.

== Executive career ==
=== UCLA ===
From 2016 to 2017, Phifer served as the director of player development for the UCLA Bruins.

=== Detroit Lions ===
In 2018, Phifer joined the Detroit Lions as an area scout.

=== Denver Broncos ===
On May 18, 2021, Phifer was hired by the Denver Broncos as a senior personnel executive.

== Film producing career ==
=== Blood Equity ===
In 2009 Phifer produced his first documentary film entitled Blood Equity, which covers the lives of several former NFL players, both big stars and rank-and-file players. The film features testimonials from NFL legends like Mike Ditka, Tony Dorsett, Darryl "Moose" Johnston and Willie Wood among others about the hardships and struggles of life after football. "He's like the Godfather of football, and you definitely get that from him when he lights up that cigar. These guys are like brothers, and he's just trying to speak on their behalf", says Rico McClinton of Iron Mike Ditka (McClinton produced the film along with Phifer and Joe Ruggiero).
