= BVHS =

BVHS may refer to:

- Blanchard Valley Health System, Findlay, Ohio, United States

== Schools ==
United States

- Bishop Verot High School, Fort Myers, Florida
- Blue Valley High School, Stilwell, Kansas
- Bonita Vista High School, Chula Vista, California
- Buckeye Valley High School, Delaware, Ohio
- Buena Vista High School (Buena Vista, Colorado)
- Bureau Valley High School, Manlius, Illinois
- Bridgewater-Hebron Village School, Bridgewater, New Hampshire- Newfound Area School District
- Brandon Valley High School, Brandon, South Dakota
