= Buena Vista High School =

Buena Vista High School is the name of several educational institutions, including:

- Buena Vista High School in Chino, California
- Buena Vista High School in Geyserville, California
- Buena Vista High School in Lakewood, California
- Buena Vista High School (Colorado) in Buena Vista, Colorado
- Buena Vista High School (Michigan) in Buena Vista Charter Township, Michigan
- Buena High School (Arizona) in Sierra Vista, Arizona
