= Tom Neville (offensive tackle) =

American football player (born 1943)

No. 77, 76, 74
- Position: Offensive tackle

Personal information
- Born: August 12, 1943 (age 83); Montgomery, Alabama, U.S.
- Listed height: 6 ft 4 in (1.93 m)
- Listed weight: 260 lb (118 kg)

Career information
- High school: Sidney Lanier (Montgomery)
- College: Mississippi State
- NFL draft: 1965: 9th round, 115th overall pick
- AFL draft: 1965: 7th round, 55th overall pick

Career history
- Boston / New England Patriots (1965-1977); Denver Broncos (1978); New York Giants (1979)

Awards and highlights
- AFL All-Star (1966); Boston Patriots All-1960s Team; New England Patriots All-1970s Team; New England Patriots 35th Anniversary Team; First-team All-SEC (1963); Second-team All-SEC (1964)

Career NFL/AFL statistics
- Games played: 190
- Games started: 149
- Fumble recoveries: 5
- Stats at Pro Football Reference

Thomas Oliver Neville (born August 12, 1943) is an American former professional football player who was an offensive tackle in the American Football League (AFL) and National Football League (NFL). He played for the AFL's Boston Patriots from 1965 through 1969, and with the NFL's Patriots, Denver Broncos, and New York Giants. He is a member of the Patriots All-1960s Team.

== See also ==
- List of American Football League players
