= Len St. Jean =

American football player (1941–2025)

No. 60, 67
- Positions: Guard, Defensive end

Personal information
- Born: October 27, 1941; Newberry, Michigan, U.S.
- Died: May 26, 2025 (aged 83); Stoughton, Massachusetts, U.S.
- Listed height: 5 ft 11 in (1.80 m)
- Listed weight: 250 lb (113 kg)

Career information
- High school: Newberry
- College: Northern Michigan (1960-1963)
- NFL draft: 1964: 17th round, 237th overall pick
- AFL draft: 1964: 9th round, 68th overall pick

Career history
- Boston / New England Patriots (1964-1973); New York Stars / Charlotte Hornets (1974-1975)

Awards and highlights
- AFL All-Star (1966); Boston Patriots 1960s AFL Team

Career NFL/AFL statistics
- Games played: 140
- Games started: 121
- Fumble recoveries: 3
- Stats at Pro Football Reference

Leonard Wayne St. Jean (October 27, 1941 – May 26, 2025) was an American professional football player who was a guard, defensive end, and defensive tackle for the Boston/New England Patriots of the American Football League (AFL) and National Football League (NFL); and was one of the Patriots best special teams players. He was selected as an AFL All-Star in 1966. St. Jean played in 140 consecutive games for the Patriots over a 10-year career, and was named to the Patriots' All-1960s team. He played college football for the Northern Michigan Wildcats as a defensive and offensive end. He received NAIA first-team All-American honors as a senior in 1963 at defensive end.

== Early life and education ==
St. Jean was born on October 27, 1941, in Newberry, Michigan. He was raised on a dairy farm in Michigan's Upper Peninsula. He attended Newberry High School, where he graduated in 1959. St. Jean's sister Barbara introduced him to football, and he became an integral member of Newberry's football team for three varsity seasons; at times walking home for miles through the woods after games and practices. He played fullback at Newberry High School. In 1958, the Detroit Free Press named St. Jean to its Class B All-State second-team at running back. He also threw the shot put on the school's track and field team.

== College career ==
St. Jean attended Northern Michigan University (NMU), in Marquette, Michigan. He began his football career at Northern Michigan as a freshman running back (fullback). He later played defensive end for the majority of his college career; though he also played offensive end. During a mid-September 1960 game against Hillsdale College, St. Jean blocked a punt and returned it 30 yards for a touchdown. He was elected a team co-captain for the 1962 season, and received all-state recognition.

In 1963 as a senior, St. Jean earned NAIA All-American and Williamson All-American first-team honors with the Wildcats as a defensive end. By mid-October of his senior year (1963), he had blocked two extra-point conversion attempts and a field goal attempt. After starting his senior season as both an offensive and defensive end, coach Frosty Ferzacca used St. Jean solely at defensive end where he led NMU's defense. In an October 1963 game against Central Michigan, he had three quarterback sacks.

Shortly before his senior season, St. Jean severely cut his hand with an axe while working as a lumber jack. He sewed the injury up himself.

== Professional career ==
=== Boston/New England Patriots ===
St. Jean was selected by the Green Bay Packers in the 17th round of 1964 NFL draft, 237th overall, but opted to join the Boston Patriots, who picked him in the ninth round of 1964 AFL draft, 68th overall. St. Jean had been planning to join the Patriots, and was surprised about his selection by the Packers; which caused him to re-evaluate his plan to join the Patriots. The fact that Northern Michigan graduate Tom Neumann was already a member of the Patriots was a big factor in St. Jean's deciding to sign a contract to play for Boston instead of trying out with the Packers. During his 10-year career with the Patriots, St. Jean would play guard, defensive end, defensive tackle, linebacker and was one of the team's best players on punt and kickoff return coverage teams.

St. Jean was a reserve defensive end as a rookie in 1964, with three quarterback sacks and one fumble recovery. He began the 1965 season as a reserve guard; and was moved to starting left defensive tackle in early October, for the Patriots' fourth game that season. He was moved to starting right defensive end in the Patriots’ eighth game that season (with Jim Lee Hunt starting at left tackle); their first win that year. The Patriots finished the 1965 season 4–2–1 with St. Jean and Hunt in their new positions; after going winless in their first seven games. St. Jean started 10 games overall in 1965, with two quarterback sacks.

In 1966, Patriots' coach Mike Holovak moved St. Jean to the offensive line, as a starting guard. St. Jean started all 14 games as a guard in 1966. The Patriots had an 8–4–2 record that season. St. Jean was selected as an AFL All-Star in 1966. The Patriots were second in team total rushing yards and gave up the third fewest sacks in the nine-team AFL that season. St. Jean received the game ball for his blocking in front of fullback Jim Nance after the Patriots' penultimate game of the season against the Houston Oilers. Nance later said of St. Jean as a blocker generally "'St. Jean is great, and especially strong in pulling out to lead plays'".

St. Jean remained the Patriots' starting right guard for the next seven years, missing only one start over that time period. The only game he missed was on October 17, 1971, when he had an infected elbow that required hospitalization, preventing him from playing. In 1966 and 1970, the Patriots' fan club, the 1776 Club, presented St. Jean with its unsung hero award. St. Jean was selected as a member of the Patriots' All-1960s (AFL) Team, and in 1979 the fans voted him as a member of the Patriots all-time team.

Overall St. Jean played in 140 consecutive games over 10 seasons for the Patriots, starting 121 games for the team. He and Patriots' center Jon Morris were roommates for 10 seasons, since their rookie seasons together; and St. Jean was the best man at Morris's wedding. In 1971, the Boston Patriots moved and changed their name to the New England Patriots. He earned the nickname "Boston Strong Boy" thanks to his feats of strength on and off the field (including lifting 600 lb/272.2 kg logs as a lumberjack in his family's business). He is also said to have earned the nickname when he alone lifted a heavy steel plate off of a man's chest who was trapped after a truck accident, saving the man's life; after three men together had been unable to move the steel plate before that.

After the 1974 NFL players strike ended in late August 1974, St. Jean said "'They (the owners) can do anything they want with us now, and we won't have much to say about it'". Less than a week later, the Patriots waived St. Jean before the start of the 1974 season. He cleared waivers, and there was a dispute between St. Jean (who said he was waived) and the Patriots (who said he was still with the team) as to why St. Jean was not in training camp in early September 1974. St. Jean said he was not in training camp because he had been cut, and Patriots' coach Chuck Fairbanks said St. Jean was still on the team and absent only because of illness. One Massachusetts' sportswriter postulated the Patriots were attempting to have St. Jean retire by his own choosing, rather than being publicly cut by the team. It was clear within days that St. Jean had been waived. St. Jean was replaced at right guard in 1974 by Sam Adams, who became the Patriots' starting right guard for eight seasons.

=== World Football League ===
After being waived by the Patriots, St. Jean signed a contract to play with the New York Stars of the World Football League (WFL), who were coached by his former Patriots' teammate Babe Parilli. The Stars moved to Charlotte during the season, becoming the Charlotte Hornets. St. Jean played two years for the New York Stars/Charlotte Hornets in the World Football League during the only two years of the league's existence before it folded in 1975. It is reported that he was released early in the Hornets' 1975 season, before the team folded. St. Jean himself said he left the team because he had enough of the team's and WFL's instability.

== Legacy and honors ==
St. Jean was inducted into the Northern Michigan Athletics Hall of Fame in 1976, and the Upper Peninsula Sports Hall of Fame in 1980. In 2013, St. Jean was inducted into the inaugural class of the Newberry High School (NHS) Athletic Hall of Fame. Since 1970, NHS has presented the annual “Len St. Jean” award to the school's top football player each season.

== Personal life and death ==
Growing up, St. Jean's family was in the lumber business. In college and early in his professional career, St. Jean would work as a lumberjack in the offseason. He reportedly could carry logs weighing up to 600 lb (272.2 kg). He played for the Patriots Basketball team in the offseason, a group of Boston players who would barnstorm in the New England area. In 1976, he helped coach the Plymouth Rocks of the sandlot Eastern Football League. Following his football career, St. Jean worked in electronics sales for All-American Semiconductor. St. Jean also worked for Raytheon. During his career, in 1968, St. Jean wrote a book of poetry about football.

He died on May 26, 2025, at the age of 83.
