= List of New England Patriots commemorative teams =

The New England Patriots are a professional American football team based in Foxborough, Massachusetts. Since their founding in 1960 as the Boston Patriots, over 1,000 players, including 10 Pro Football Hall of Famers have played for the team. Starting in 2010, every ten years the club's Patriots Hall of Fame committee will release an all-decade team to celebrate the greatest members of the team at every position during each respective decade. The committee has retroactively released all-decade teams for every decade prior to the 2000s. In addition, periodically, the Patriots Hall of Fame committee will release an anniversary team to celebrate the greatest members of the team at every position up to the year of publication. (Note: The 35th Anniversary team in 1994 was selected exclusively by local media with no additions from the Patriots Hall of Fame committee.)

== Patriots All-Decade teams ==
=== 1960s (AFL) ===
In November 1971, fans voted on a 10-year Patriots anniversary team, which coincided with the team's 10 years in the then-defunct American Football League: Additional selections for returner, special teamer, and coach were added in 2009:

Bold indicates those elected to the Pro Football Hall of Fame.

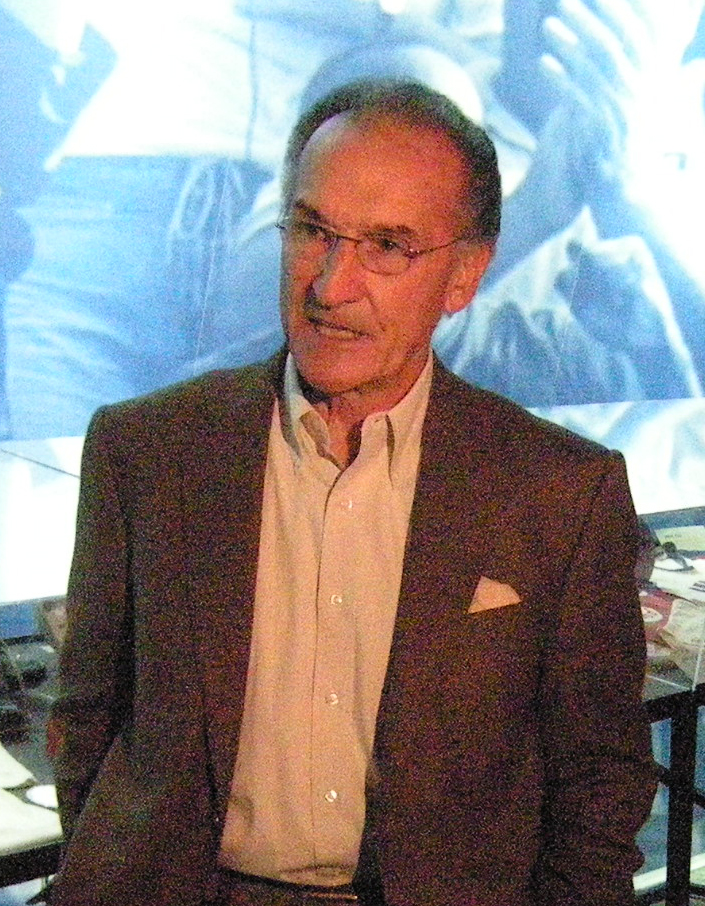
FL/K Gino Cappelletti was one of the franchise's first star players, playing from the inaugural season until the 1970 season. He then remained close to the team as broadcaster until 2012.

Boston Patriots All-1960s team (1971)
Unit	Position	Players & coach
Offense	Quarterback	Vito "Babe" Parilli (QB) 1961–1967
Offense	Running back	Jim Nance (FB) 1965–1971; Larry Garron (RB) 1960–1968
Offense	Wide receiver	Jim Colclough (WR) 1960–1968; Art Graham (WR) 1963–1968
Offense	Tight end	Jim Whalen (TE) 1965–1969
Offense	Offensive line	Charlie Long (T) 1961–1969; Tom Neville (T) 1965–1977; Billy Neighbors (G) 1962–1965; Len St. Jean (G) 1964–1973; Jon Morris (C) 1964–1974
Defense	Defensive line	Bob Dee (DE) 1960–1967; Larry Eisenhauer (DE) 1961–1969; Houston Antwine (DT) 1961–1971; Jim Lee Hunt (DT) 1960–1970
Defense	Linebacker	Tom Addison (OLB) 1960–1967; Ed Philpott (OLB) 1967–1971; **Nick Buoniconti** (MLB) 1962–1968
Defense	Cornerback	Chuck Shonta (CB) 1960–1967; Daryl Johnson (CB) 1968–1970
Defense	Safety	Don Webb (SS) 1961–1971; Ron Hall (FS) 1961–1967
Special teams	Kicker/punter	Gino Cappelletti (K) 1960–1970; Tom Yewcic (P) 1961–1966
Special teams	Returner	Larry Garron 1960–1968
Special teams	Coverage	Don Webb 1961–1971
Coach	Coach	Mike Holovak 1961–1968

=== 1970s ===
In March 2009, as part of the Patriots' 50th anniversary, a group of local media and other team figures selected all-decade teams for the 1970s, 1980s, and 1990s:

Bold indicates those elected to the Pro Football Hall of Fame.

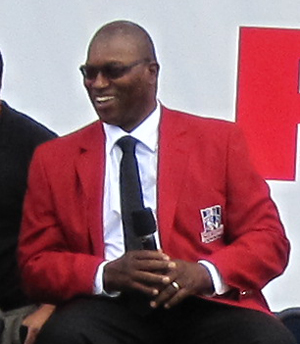
RB Sam "Bam" Cunningham is the franchise's all-time rushing yards leader. He was the leading rusher of the historical 1978 team, in which the Patriots achieved an NFL record 3,165 total rushing yards as a team. This league record stood until 2019.

New England Patriots All-1970s team (2009)
Unit	Position	Players & coach
Offense	Quarterback	Steve Grogan (QB) 1975–1990
Offense	Running back	Sam Cunningham (RB) 1973–1982; Andy Johnson (RB) 1974–1982
Offense	Wide receiver	Stanley Morgan (WR) 1977–1989; Randy Vataha (WR) 1971–1976
Offense	Tight end	Russ Francis (TE) 1975–1980, 1987–1989
Offense	Offensive line	Leon Gray (T) 1973–1978; Tom Neville (T) 1965–1977; **John Hannah** (G) 1973–1985; Sam Adams Sr. (G) 1972–1980; Bill Lenkaitis (C) 1971–1981
Defense	Defensive line	Julius Adams (DE) 1971–1985, 1987; Tony McGee (DE) 1974–1981; Ray Hamilton (DT) 1973–1981
Defense	Linebacker	Steve Zabel (OLB) 1975–1978; Steve King (OLB) 1973–1981; Steve Nelson (ILB) 1974–1987; Sam Hunt (ILB) 1974–1979
Defense	Cornerback	Raymond Clayborn (CB) 1977–1989; **Mike Haynes** (CB) 1976–1982
Defense	Safety	Tim Fox (SS) 1976–1981; Prentice McCray (FS) 1974–1980
Special teams	Kicker/punter	John Smith (K) 1974–1983; Mike Patrick (P) 1975–1978
Special teams	Returner	Mack Herron 1973–1975
Special teams	Coverage	Mosi Tatupu 1978–1990
Coach	Coach	Chuck Fairbanks 1973–1978

=== 1980s ===
In March 2009, as part of the Patriots' 50th anniversary, a group of local media and other team figures selected all-decade teams for the 1970s, 1980s, and 1990s:

Bold indicates those elected to the Pro Football Hall of Fame.

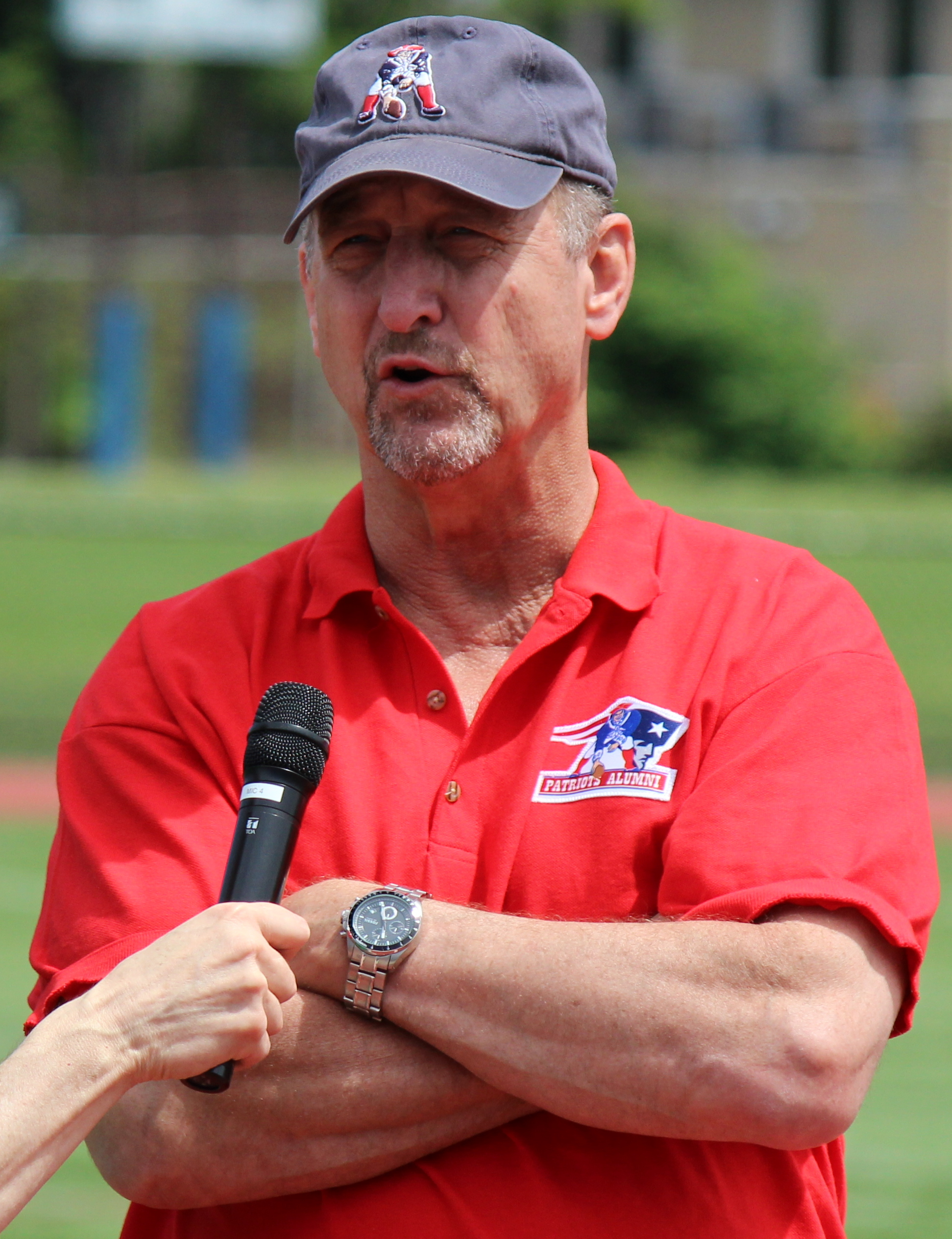
QB Steve Grogan was known as one of the daring players of his era, with his willingness to scramble out of the pocket. His 12 rushing touchdowns as a QB in 1976 would stand as single-season NFL-record until 2011, when Cam Newton surpassed it.

New England Patriots All-1980s team (2009)
Unit	Position	Players & coach
Offense	Quarterback	Steve Grogan (QB) 1975–1990
Offense	Running back	Tony Collins (RB) 1981–1987; Craig James (RB) 1984–1988
Offense	Wide receiver	Stanley Morgan (WR) 1977–1989; Irving Fryar (WR) 1984–1992
Offense	Tight end	Lin Dawson (TE) 1981–1990
Offense	Offensive line	Bruce Armstrong (T) 1987–2000; Brian Holloway (T) 1981–1986; **John Hannah** (G) 1973–1985; Ron Wooten (G) 1981–1988; Pete Brock (C) 1976–1987
Defense	Defensive line	Julius Adams (DE) 1971–1985, 1987; Garin Veris (DE) 1985–1991; Richard Bishop (DT) 1976–1981
Defense	Linebacker	**Andre Tippett** (OLB) 1982–1993; Don Blackmon (OLB) 1981–1987; Steve Nelson (ILB) 1974–1987; Johnny Rembert (ILB) 1983–1992
Defense	Cornerback	Raymond Clayborn (CB) 1977–1989; Ronnie Lippett (CB) 1983–1991
Defense	Safety	Roland James (SS) 1980–1990; Fred Marion (FS) 1982–1991
Special teams	Kicker/punter	Tony Franklin (K) 1984–1987; Rich Camarillo (P) 1981–1987
Special teams	Returner	Irving Fryar 1984–1992
Special teams	Coverage	Mosi Tatupu 1978–1990
Coach	Coach	Raymond Berry 1984–1989

=== 1990s ===
In March 2009, as part of the Patriots' 50th anniversary, a group of local media and other team figures selected all-decade teams for the 1970s, 1980s, and 1990s:

Bold indicates those elected to the Pro Football Hall of Fame.

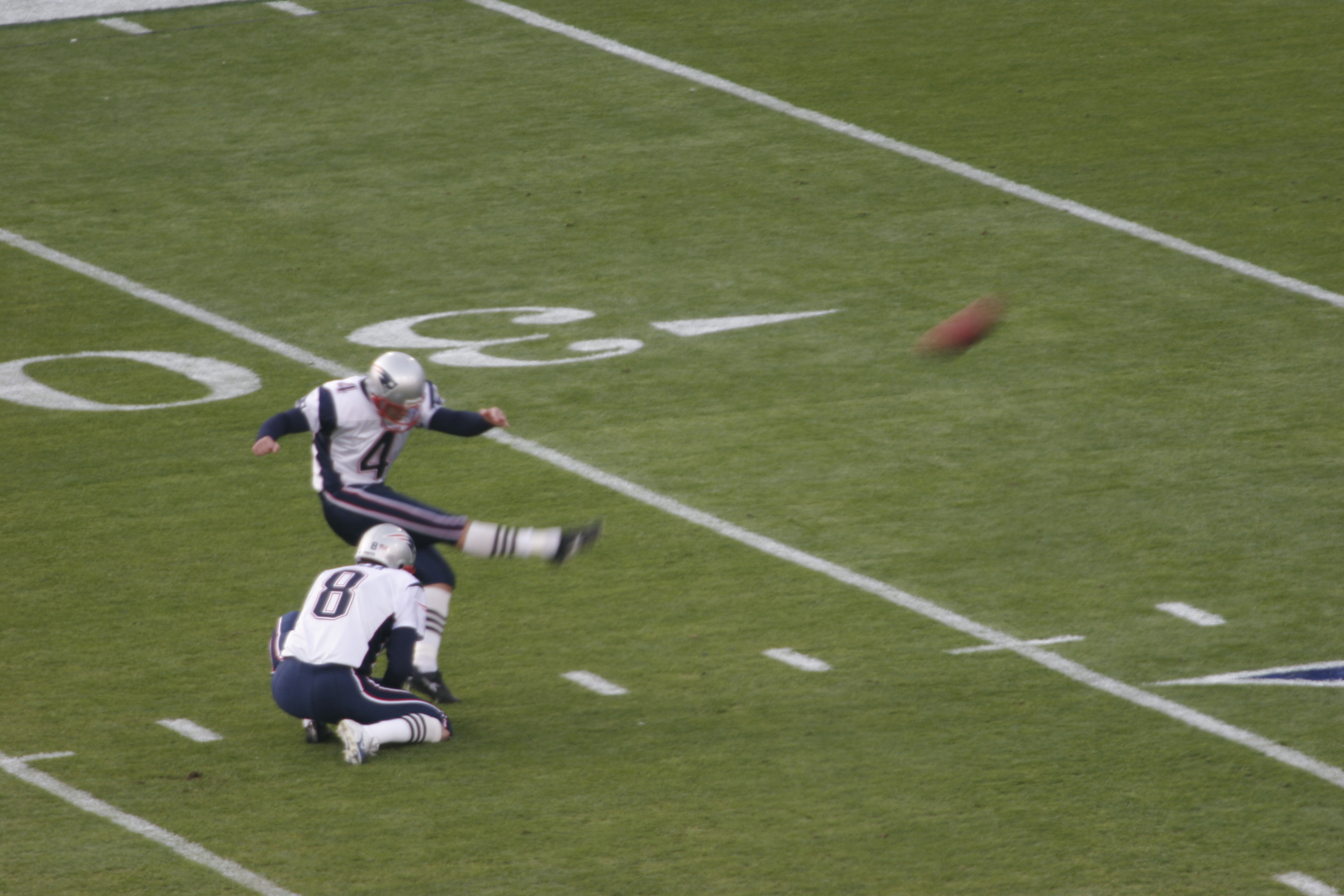
K Adam Vinatieri began his long and storied career with the Patriots, completing multiple franchise-altering kicks to help the team reach and win three Super Bowls. Vinatieri kicked two famous field goals in the Tuck Rule Game in blizzard-like conditions, as well as the game-winning field goals in the Patriots' first two Super Bowl victories.

New England Patriots All-1990s team (2009)
Unit	Position	Players & coach
Offense	Quarterback	Drew Bledsoe (QB) 1993–2001
Offense	Running back	**Curtis Martin** (RB) 1995–1997; Leonard Russell (RB) 1991–1993
Offense	Wide receiver	Terry Glenn (WR) 1996–2001; Shawn Jefferson (WR) 1996–1999
Offense	Tight end	Ben Coates (TE) 1991–1999
Offense	Offensive line	Bruce Armstrong (T) 1987–2000; Pat Harlow (T) 1991–1995; Todd Rucci (G) 1993–1999; Max Lane (G) 1994–2000; Dave Wohlabaugh (C) 1995–1998
Defense	Defensive line	Willie McGinest (DE) 1994–2005; Brent Williams (DE) 1986–1993; Tim Goad (DT) 1988–1994
Defense	Linebacker	**Andre Tippett** (OLB) 1982–1993; Chris Slade (OLB) 1993–2000; Vincent Brown (ILB) 1988–1995; Ted Johnson (ILB) 1995–2004
Defense	Cornerback	Maurice Hurst (CB) 1989–1995; **Ty Law** (CB) 1995–2004
Defense	Safety	Willie Clay (SS) 1996–1998; Lawyer Milloy (SS) 1996–2002
Special teams	Kicker/punter	**Adam Vinatieri** (K) 1996–2005; Tom Tupa (P) 1996–1998
Special teams	Returner	Dave Meggett 1995–1997
Special teams	Coverage	Larry Whigham 1994–2000
Coach	Coach	**Bill Parcells** 1993–1996

=== 2000s ===
On March 16, 2010, the Patriots Hall of Fame selection committee selected an all-decade team for the 2000s:

Bold indicates those elected to the Pro Football Hall of Fame.

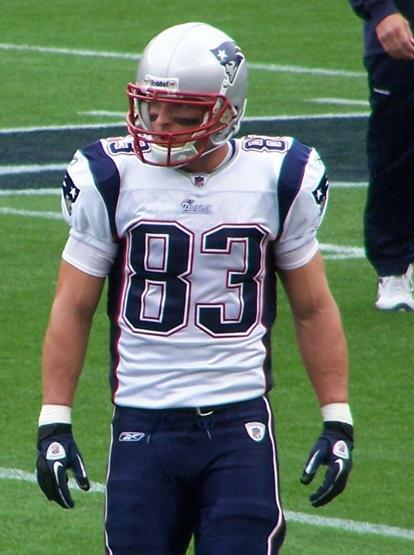
WR Wes Welker, despite being undrafted and undersized, broke barriers and re-defined the slot receiver position in the NFL. He holds the franchise's career receptions record (672), single-season receptions record (123 in 2009), and single-season receiving yards record (1,569 yards in 2011).

New England Patriots All-2000s team (2010)
Unit	Position	Players & coach
Offense	Quarterback	Tom Brady (QB) 2000–2019
Offense	Running back	Corey Dillon (RB) 2004–2006
Offense	Wide receiver	**Randy Moss** (WR) 2007–2010; Wes Welker (WR) 2007–2012; Troy Brown (WR) 1993–2007
Offense	Tight end	Daniel Graham (TE) 2002–2006
Offense	Offensive line	Matt Light (T) 2001–2011; Nick Kaczur (T) 2005–2010; Joe Andruzzi (G) 2000–2004; Logan Mankins (G) 2005–2013; Dan Koppen (C) 2003–2011
Defense	Defensive line	**Richard Seymour** (DE) 2001–2008; Ty Warren (DE) 2003–2010; Vince Wilfork (DT) 2004–2014
Defense	Linebacker	Willie McGinest (OLB) 1994–2005; Mike Vrabel (OLB) 2001–2008; Tedy Bruschi (ILB) 1996–2008; Roman Phifer (ILB) 2001–2004
Defense	Cornerback	**Ty Law** (CB) 1995–2004; Asante Samuel (CB) 2003–2007
Defense	Safety	Lawyer Milloy (SS) 1996–2002; Rodney Harrison (SS) 2003–2008
Special teams	Kicker/punter	**Adam Vinatieri** (K) 1996–2005; Josh Miller (P) 2004–2006
Special teams	Returner	Kevin Faulk 1999–2011
Special teams	Coverage	Larry Izzo 2001–2008
Coach	Coach	Bill Belichick 2000–2023

=== 2010s ===
On April 29, 2020, the Patriots Hall of Fame selection committee selected an all-decade team for the 2010s:

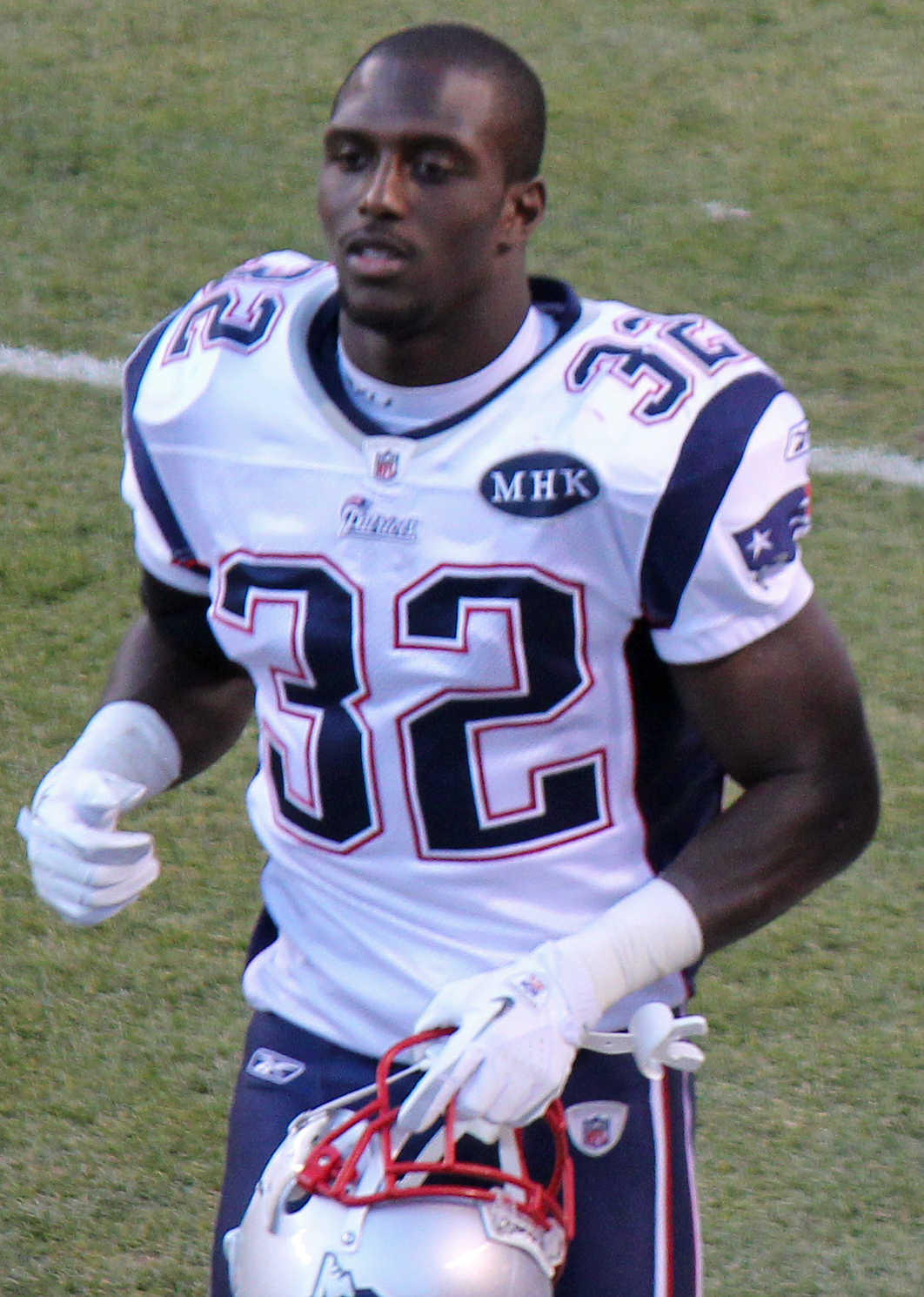
A Rutgers product, FS Devin McCourty was one of the defensive stalwarts of the 2010s teams.

New England Patriots All-2010s team (2020)
Unit	Position	Players & coach
Offense	Quarterback	Tom Brady (QB) 2000–2019
Offense	Running back	James White (RB) 2014–2021; James Develin (FB) 2012–2019
Offense	Wide receiver	Wes Welker (WR) 2007–2012; Julian Edelman (WR) 2009–2020; Danny Amendola (Flex) 2013–2017
Offense	Tight end	Rob Gronkowski (TE) 2010–2018
Offense	Offensive line	Sebastian Vollmer (T) 2009–2016; Nate Solder (T) 2011–2017; Joe Thuney (G) 2016–2020; Logan Mankins (G) 2005–2013; David Andrews (C) 2015–2025
Defense	Defensive line	Chandler Jones (DE) 2012–2015; Trey Flowers (DE) 2015–2018, 2023; Vince Wilfork (DT) 2004–2014; Lawrence Guy (DT) 2017–2023
Defense	Linebacker	Rob Ninkovich (OLB) 2009–2016; Kyle Van Noy (OLB) 2016–2019, 2021; Jerod Mayo (ILB) 2008–2015; Dont'a Hightower (ILB) 2012–2021
Defense	Cornerback	Malcolm Butler (CB) 2014–2017; Stephon Gilmore (CB) 2017–2020
Defense	Safety	Patrick Chung (SS) 2009–2012, 2014–2020; Devin McCourty (FS) 2010–2022
Special teams	Kicker/punter	Stephen Gostkowski (K) 2006–2019; Ryan Allen (P) 2013–2018
Special teams	Returner	Julian Edelman 2009–2020
Special teams	Coverage	Matthew Slater 2008–2023
Coach	Coach	Bill Belichick 2000–2023

== Patriots Anniversary teams ==
=== 35th Anniversary team (1994) ===
In 1994, a group of local media selected a 35th anniversary team:

Bold indicates those elected to the Pro Football Hall of Fame.

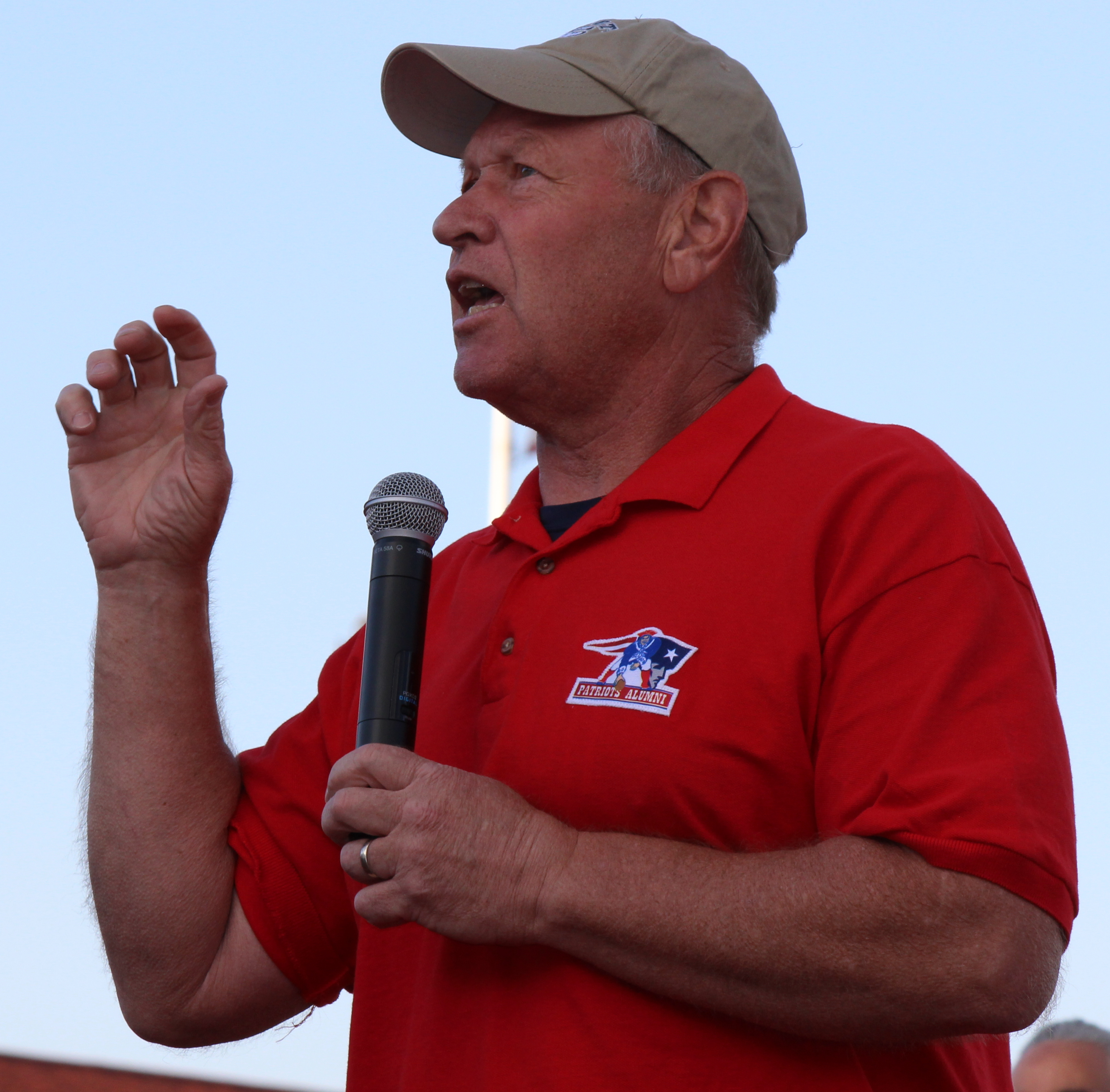
LB Steve Nelson was a defensive anchor for the Patriots for 14 seasons.

New England Patriots 35th Anniversary team (1994)
Unit	Position	Players
Offense	Quarterback	Steve Grogan (QB) 1975–1990
Offense	Running back	Jim Nance (FB) 1965–1971; Sam Cunningham (HB) 1973–1982
Offense	Wide receiver	Stanley Morgan (WR) 1977–1989; Gino Cappelletti (WR) 1960–1970
Offense	Tight end	Russ Francis (TE) 1975–1980, 1987–1989
Offense	Offensive line	Bruce Armstrong (T) 1987–2000; Tom Neville (T) 1965–1977; **John Hannah** (G) 1973–1985; Sam Adams Sr. (G) 1972–1980; Jon Morris (C) 1964–1974
Defense	Defensive line	Julius Adams (DE) 1971–1985, 1987; Larry Eisenhauer (DE) 1961–1969; Houston Antwine (DT) 1961–1971; Jim Lee Hunt (DT) 1960–1970
Defense	Linebacker	**Andre Tippett** (LB) 1982–1993; **Nick Buoniconti** (LB) 1962–1968; Steve Nelson (LB) 1974–1987; Sam Hunt (LB) 1974–1979
Defense	Cornerback	**Mike Haynes** (CB) 1976–1982; Raymond Clayborn (CB) 1977–1989
Defense	Safety	Ron Hall (SS) 1961–1967; Fred Marion (FS) 1982–1991
Special teams	Kicker/punter	Gino Cappelletti (K) 1960–1970; Rich Camarillo (P) 1981-1987
Special teams	Coverage	Mosi Tatupu 1978–1990

=== 50th Anniversary team (2009) ===
In 2009, the Patriots Hall of Fame selection committee selected a 50th anniversary team:

Bold indicates those elected to the Pro Football Hall of Fame.

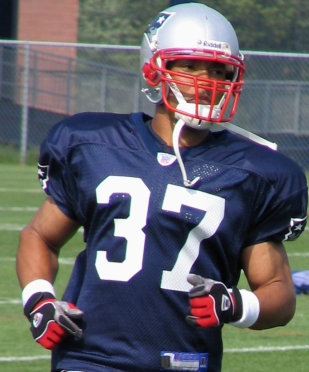
S Rodney Harrison joined the Patriots after the team failed to repeat as champions in the 2002 season. His physicality, mental toughness and work ethic was a perfect fit and led to Harrison having a big role in the Patriots winning back-to-back Super Bowls in 2003 and 2004.

New England Patriots 50th Anniversary team (2009)
Unit	Position	Players & coach
Offense	Quarterback	Tom Brady (QB) 2000–2019
Offense	Running back	Jim Nance (FB) 1965–1971; Sam Cunningham (RB) 1973–1982
Offense	Wide receiver	Stanley Morgan (WR) 1977–1989; Troy Brown (WR) 1993–2007; Irving Fryar (WR) 1984–1992
Offense	Tight end	Ben Coates (TE) 1991–1999
Offense	Offensive line	Bruce Armstrong (T) 1987–2000; Matt Light (T) 2001–2011; **John Hannah** (G) 1973–1985; Logan Mankins (G) 2005–2013; Jon Morris (C) 1964–1974
Defense	Defensive line	Julius Adams (DE) 1971–1985, 1987; **Richard Seymour** (DE) 2001–2008; Houston Antwine (DT) 1961–1971; Vince Wilfork (DT) 2004–2014
Defense	Linebacker	**Andre Tippett** (OLB) 1982–1993; Mike Vrabel (OLB) 2001–2008; Steve Nelson (ILB) 1974–1987; **Nick Buoniconti** (ILB) 1962–1968
Defense	Cornerback	**Mike Haynes** (CB) 1976–1982; **Ty Law** (CB) 1995–2004
Defense	Safety	Rodney Harrison (SS) 2003–2008; Fred Marion (FS) 1982–1991
Special teams	Kicker/punter	**Adam Vinatieri** (K) 1996–2005; Rich Camarillo (P) 1981-1987
Special teams	Returner	Kevin Faulk 1999–2011
Special teams	Coverage	Mosi Tatupu 1978–1990
Captains	Captains	Gino Cappelletti (Offense) 1960–1970; Tedy Bruschi (Defense) 1996–2008
Coach	Coach	Bill Belichick 2000–2023

== All-Dynasty team (2001–2019) ==
On October 22, 2020, the Patriots Hall of Fame selection committee selected a one-time "All-Dynasty Team" to celebrate the greatest members of the team at every position throughout the Patriots dynasty from 2001 to 2019:

Bold indicates those elected to the Pro Football Hall of Fame.

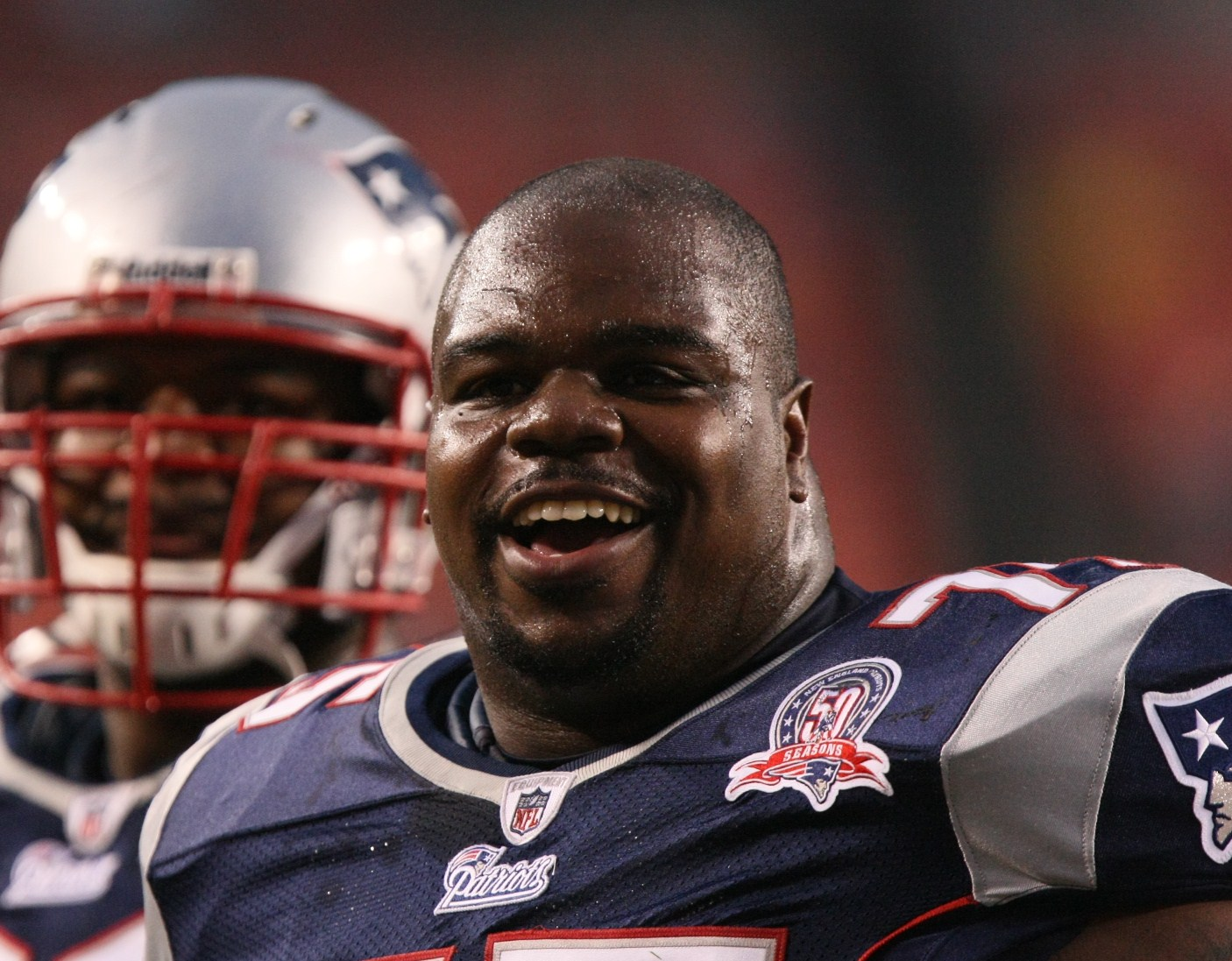
DT Vince Wilfork was drafted in the 2004 NFL draft and contributed immediately. Wilfork is known as one of the greatest pure nose tackles in NFL history, and was a favorite amongst teammates and fans alike.

New England Patriots All-Dynasty team (2001–2019)
Unit	Position	Players & coach
Offense	Quarterback	Tom Brady (QB) 2000–2019
Offense	Running back	Kevin Faulk (RB) 1999–2011; Corey Dillon (RB) 2004–2006; James White (RB) 2014–2021; James Develin (FB) 2012–2019
Offense	Wide receiver	Troy Brown (WR) 1993–2007; Wes Welker (WR) 2007–2012; **Randy Moss** (WR) 2007–2010; Julian Edelman (WR) 2009–2020
Offense	Tight end	Daniel Graham (TE) 2002–2006; Rob Gronkowski (TE) 2010–2018
Offense	Offensive line	Matt Light (T) 2001–2011; Sebastian Vollmer (T) 2009–2016; Nate Solder (T) 2011–2017; Joe Andruzzi (G) 2000–2004; Logan Mankins (G) 2005–2013; Joe Thuney (G) 2016–2020; Dan Koppen (C) 2003–2011
Defense	Defensive line	**Richard Seymour** (DE) 2001–2008; Ty Warren (DE) 2003–2010; Vince Wilfork (DT) 2004–2014
Defense	Linebacker	Willie McGinest (OLB) 1994–2005; Mike Vrabel (OLB) 2001–2008; Rob Ninkovich (OLB) 2009–2016; Tedy Bruschi (ILB) 1996–2008; Roman Phifer (ILB) 2001–2004; Dont'a Hightower (ILB) 2012–2021
Defense	Cornerback	**Ty Law** (CB) 1995–2004; Asante Samuel (CB) 2003–2007; Stephon Gilmore (CB) 2017–2020
Defense	Safety	Rodney Harrison (SS) 2003–2008; Devin McCourty (FS) 2010–2022; Patrick Chung (SS) 2009–2012, 2014–2019
Special teams	Kicker/punter	**Adam Vinatieri** (K) 1996–2005; Ryan Allen (P) 2013-2018
Special teams	Returner	Bethel Johnson 2003–2005; Ellis Hobbs 2005–2008; Julian Edelman 2009–2020
Special teams	Coverage	Larry Izzo 2001–2008; Matthew Slater 2008–2023
Special teams	Long snapper	Lonie Paxton 2000–2008; Joe Cardona 2015–2024
Coach	Coach	Bill Belichick 2000–2023

== Notes and references ==
Explanatory notes

Citations
