= Nate Solder =

American football player (born 1988)

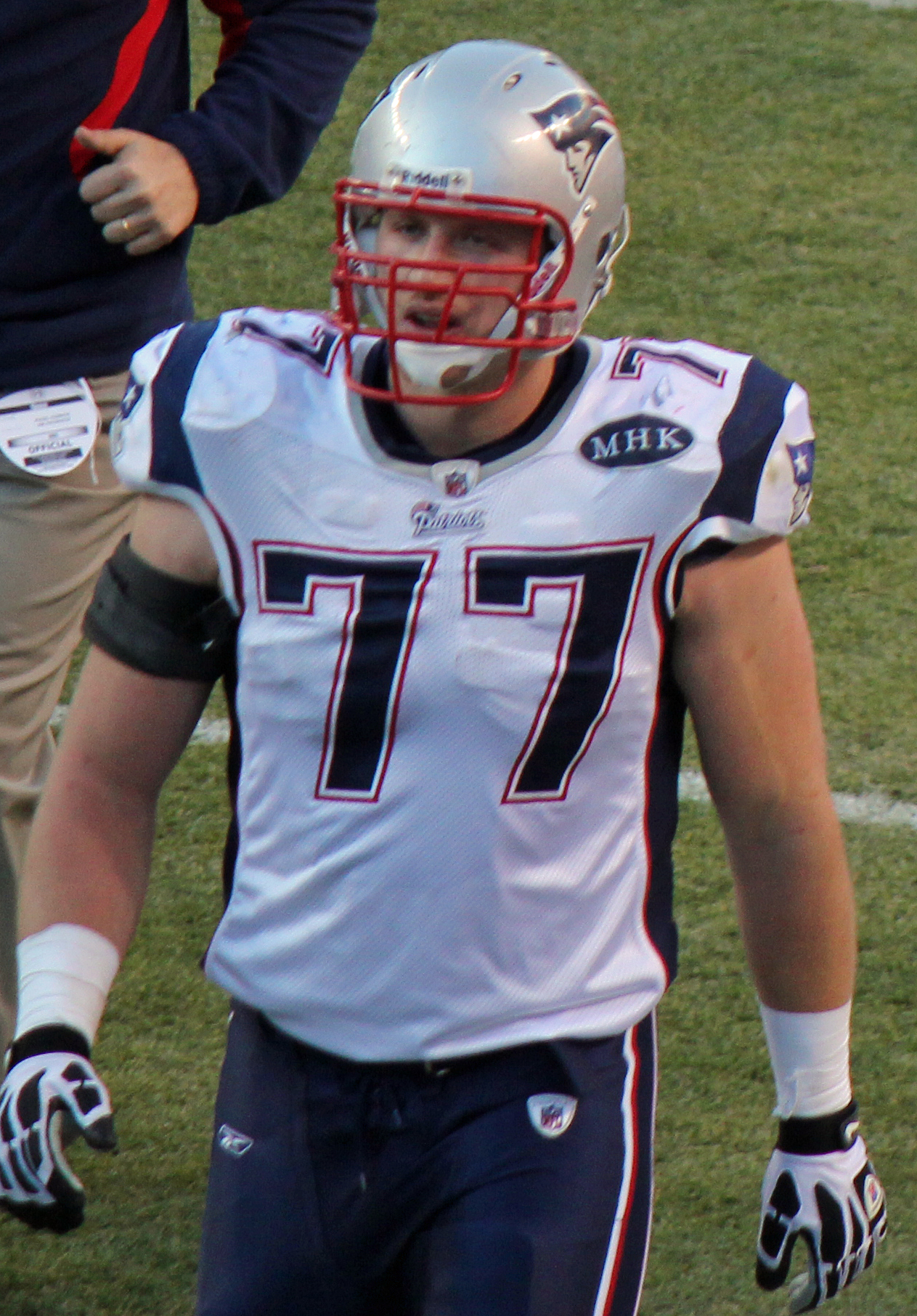
- Solder with the New England Patriots in 2011

No. 77, 76
- Position: Offensive tackle

Personal information
- Born: April 12, 1988 (age 38); Denver, Colorado, U.S.
- Listed height: 6 ft 9 in (2.06 m)
- Listed weight: 316 lb (143 kg)

Career information
- High school: Buena Vista (Buena Vista, Colorado)
- College: Colorado (2006–2010)
- NFL draft: 2011: 1st round, 17th overall pick

Career history
- New England Patriots (2011–2017); New York Giants (2018–2021)

Awards and highlights
- 2× Super Bowl champion (XLIX, LI); PFWA All-Rookie Team (2011); New England Patriots All-2010s Team; New England Patriots All-Dynasty Team; Big 12 Offensive Lineman of the Year (2010); Consensus All-American (2010); 2× First-team All-Big 12 (2009, 2010)

Career NFL statistics
- Games played: 146
- Games started: 143
- Stats at Pro Football Reference

Nathaniel Perry Solder (born April 12, 1988) is an American former professional football player who was an offensive tackle in the National Football League (NFL). He played college football for the Colorado Buffaloes, and was recognized as a consensus All-American. Solder was selected by the New England Patriots in the first round of the 2011 NFL draft and won two Super Bowls as a member of the team.

== Early life ==
Solder was born in Denver, Colorado. He attended Buena Vista High School in Buena Vista, Colorado, where he played tight end for the Buena Vista Demons high school football team.

College recruiting
Name	Hometown	School	Height	Weight	40^{‡}	Commit date
Nate Solder; TE	Buena Vista, Colorado	Buena Vista High School	6 ft 8 in (2.03 m)	240 lb (110 kg)	4.9	Nov 25, 2005
Nate Solder; TE	Recruit ratings: Scout: Rivals:					
Overall recruit ranking: Scout: -- Rivals: 35 (CO)
‡ Refers to 40-yard dash; Note: In many cases, Scout, Rivals, 247Sports, On3, and ESPN may conflict in their listings of height, weight and 40 time.; In these cases, the average was taken. ESPN grades are on a 100-point scale.; Sources: "2005 Team Ranking". Rivals.com.

== College career ==
In the Spring 2006, Solder signed a letter of intent to attend the University of Colorado, where he played for the Colorado Buffaloes football team from 2006 to 2010. Recruited as a tight end, Solder red-shirted in 2006. In 2007, he played at tight end, catching three passes for 50 yards. As a red-shirt sophomore, Solder was asked to bulk up and shift from tight end to tackle: he quickly won a spot in the starting offensive line, a position Solder would keep for the rest of his Colorado career, starting every game over the next three seasons. In his junior season: he again started every game, and was named a fourth-team All-American by College Football Insiders. Solder came to Colorado as a redshirt freshman in 2006 as a 6' 7" and 230-pound tight end; by 2009, he was listed at 6' 9" and 305 pounds.

Solder was one of three finalists for the 2010 Outland Trophy, along with Gabe Carimi and Rodney Hudson; Carimi won. Jon Gruden of ESPN said that Solder "has a huge upside. But remember he's a converted tight end and a work in progress."

Following Christmas 2009, Solder traveled to Guatemala and volunteered at an orphanage; as a sophomore, he went to Italy during the summer to help rebuild a town after it suffered many collapses from an earthquake. At CU, Solder regularly participated in the "Read with the Buffs" and "Buffalo Hugs" programs.

== Professional career ==
Pre-draft measurables
Height	Weight	Arm length	Hand span	Wingspan	40-yard dash	10-yard split	20-yard split	20-yard shuttle	Three-cone drill	Vertical jump	Broad jump	Bench press
6 ft 8 1/4 in (2.04 m)	319 lb (145 kg)	35 1/2 in (0.90 m)	9 7/8 in (0.25 m)	6 ft 9 3/4 in (2.08 m)	5.05 s	1.77 s	2.93 s	4.34 s	7.44 s	32 in (0.81 m)	9 ft 2 in (2.79 m)	21 reps
All values from NFL Combine

"To me, he's one of the most gifted tackles I've seen in the last couple of years from a foot-technique perspective"

— NFL Network analyst Mike Mayock noted.

=== New England Patriots ===
==== 2011 season ====
The New England Patriots made Solder the second offensive tackle chosen in the 2011 NFL draft (after Tyron Smith) when they drafted him 17th overall, with the pick they received from the Oakland Raiders in a 2009 trade for Richard Seymour. Solder had a private workout with Patriots offensive line coach Dante Scarnecchia just a few days before the draft.

Solder signed a contract on August 4, 2011; per the new CBA, it was a four-year deal worth $8.54 million including a $4.7 million signing bonus. Solder played his first regular season game against the Miami Dolphins on September 12 and allowed just one sack against Pro Bowler Cameron Wake.

Solder was on the active roster for all of the Patriots' games, and started 13 of 16 regular-season games. In some of those games he filled in for right tackle Sebastian Vollmer; when both Vollmer and left tackle Matt Light were healthy, Solder was used primarily as an additional tight end (making him a tackle eligible). During the regular season, Solder allowed just three sacks, four pressures, and five penalties on 880 snaps, according to Pro Football Focus.

At the end of the 2011 season, Solder and the Patriots appeared in Super Bowl XLVI. He started the game, but the Patriots once again lost to the New York Giants, this time by a score of 21–17.

==== 2012 season ====
In 2012, after Light's retirement, Solder became the Patriots' starting left tackle. He started every game of the season, and played 1,234 snaps on offense, the highest of any offensive player in the NFL. Counting special teams, Solder played 1,333 snaps, second only to fellow Patriots lineman Ryan Wendell.

==== 2014 season ====
After the 2013 season, the Patriots exercised their fifth-year option on Solder. During the AFC Championship Game, he caught his first career pass, resulting in a 16-yard touchdown. Despite an up and down regular season, Solder had an excellent postseason and won his first Super Bowl with the Patriots, who had won their first Super Bowl in 10 years.

In April 2015, Solder revealed that he had been diagnosed with testicular cancer after his annual team physical. Doctors removed the affected testicle, and, after missing a few weeks of off-season activities, Solder went on to start every game for the Patriots in the 2014 season. He is one of two Patriots linemen to have been treated for cancer; fellow 2011 Patriots draftee Marcus Cannon was diagnosed with lymphoma prior to being drafted.

==== 2015 season ====
On September 9, 2015, the Patriots gave Solder a two-year extension, through the 2017 season adding about $20 million in new money, A clause in the extension prohibited the Patriots from using the franchise tag on Solder in 2018. Before the 2015 season, Solder was voted a captain by his teammates for the first time in his career.

In a Week 5 matchup against the Dallas Cowboys, Solder left the game with what was initially described as an elbow injury. It was later determined that he tore his right bicep; Solder was subsequently placed on season-ending injured reserve.

==== 2016 season ====
Solder came back in 2016 after the injury the previous season and started 15 regular-season games at left tackle for the Patriots. Solder helped the Patriots reach Super Bowl LI.

On February 5, 2017, Solder was part of the Patriots team that won Super Bowl LI. In the game, the Patriots defeated the Atlanta Falcons by a score of 34–28 in overtime. The Patriots trailed 28–3 in the third quarter, but rallied all the way back to win the game, which featured the first overtime game in Super Bowl history and the largest comeback in the Super Bowl.

==== 2017 season ====
Solder started all 16 regular-season games at left tackle for the Patriots. The Patriots reached Super Bowl LII, but failed to repeat as Super Bowl Champions for the first time since 2004 after falling to the Philadelphia Eagles 41–33, in a rematch of Super Bowl XXXIX.

=== New York Giants ===
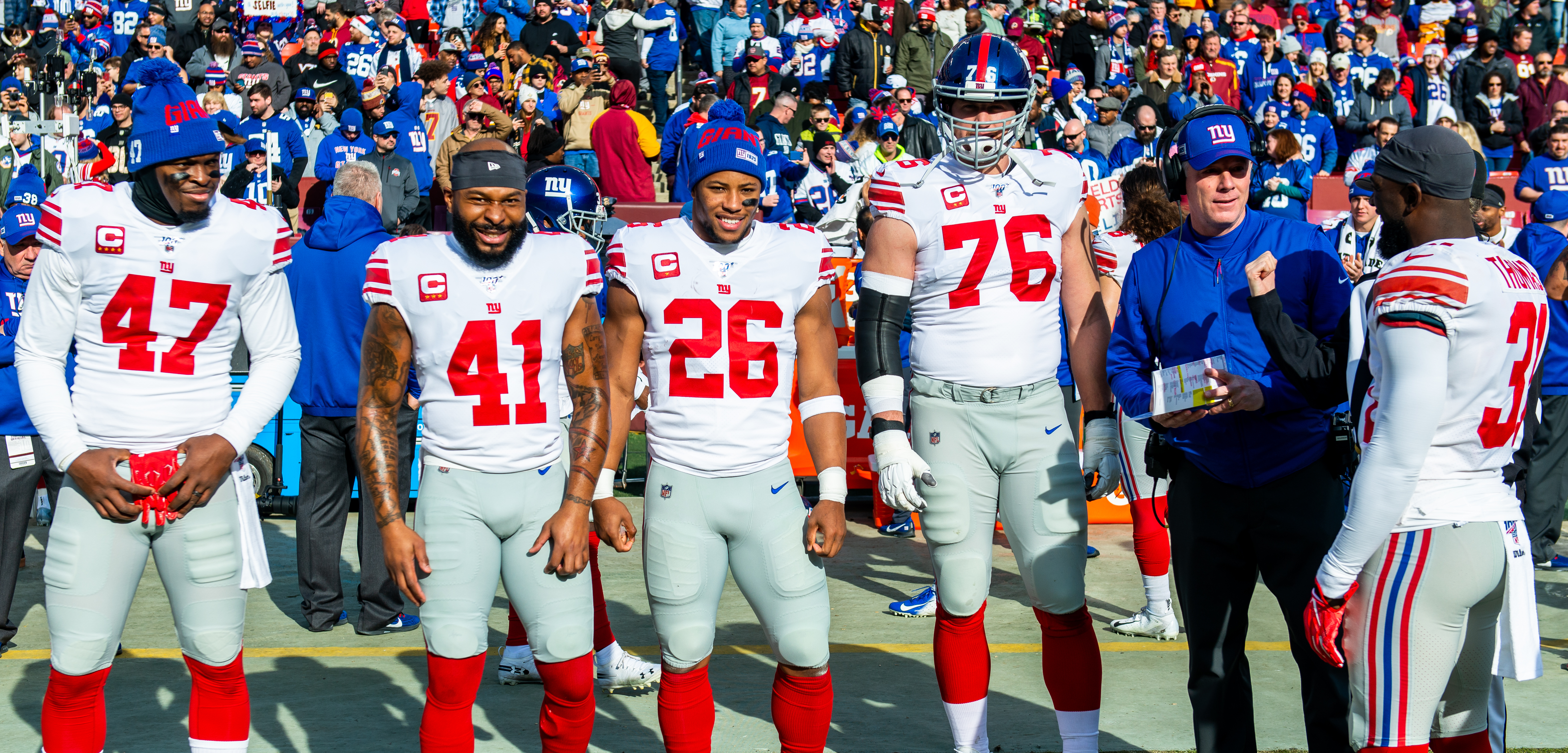
Solder alongside other Giants' team captains in a game against the Washington Redskins

On March 15, 2018, Solder signed a four-year, $62 million contract with the New York Giants with $35 million guaranteed, making him the highest-paid offensive lineman in the league at the time. Solder was named the Giants starting left tackle in 2018, starting all 16 games. However, he missed the playoffs for the first time in his seven-year career, as the Giants finished 5–11.

On July 31, 2020, Solder announced he would opt out of the 2020 season due to the COVID-19 pandemic. He signed a new contract with the team after the season on March 17, 2021.

On February 16, 2022, Solder's contract automatically became voided, ending his tenure with the Giants. Solder would retire after leaving the team.

=== NFL career statistics ===
Year	Team	Games	
Year	Team	GP	GS
2011	NE	16	13
2012	NE	16	16
2013	NE	15	15
2014	NE	16	16
2015	NE	5	5
2016	NE	15	15
2017	NE	16	16
2018	NYG	16	16
2019	NYG	16	16
2020	NYG	0	0
2021	NYG	16	16
Career		146	143

== Personal life ==
Solder is a Christian. He and his wife, Lexi Allen, were married in 2014. She is from Southbury, Connecticut and won the NCAA Division II Women's Basketball Championship while playing guard at Southern Connecticut State University in 2007. They have three children: Hudson, Charlie Grace, and Emerson.

In 2015, when Hudson was three months old, Solder was diagnosed with cancer. He has been undergoing treatment ever since, including surgery to remove tumors in 2019.

Solder has been a supporter of Compassion International. In 2018, the Solder family donated to the organization to provide eight service centers in three countries. In 2020, he and his family donated $1 million to the organization.
