= Joe Cardona =

American football player (born 1992)

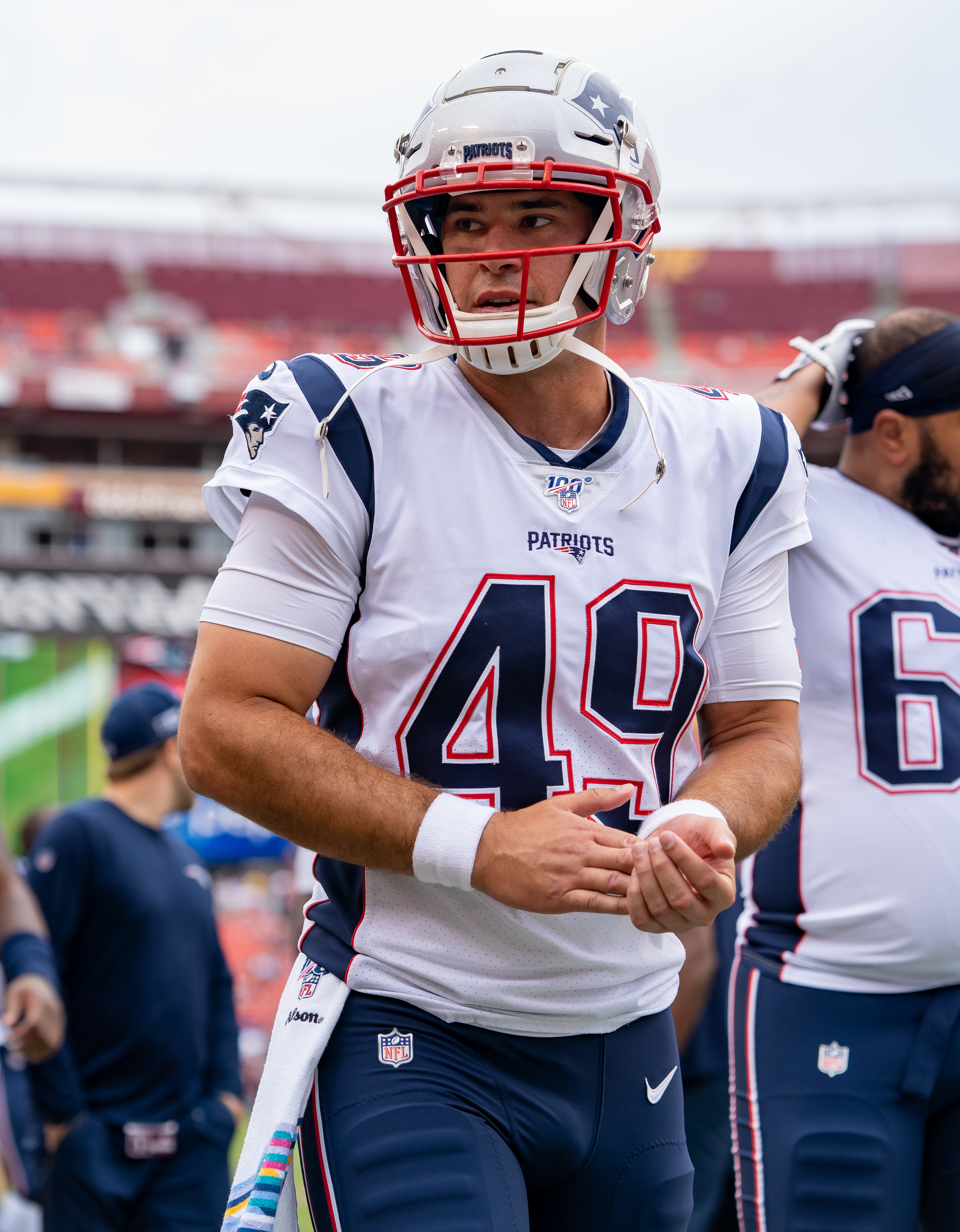
- Cardona with the New England Patriots in 2019

No. 49 – Los Angeles Rams
- Position: Long snapper
- Roster status: Active

Personal information
- Born: April 16, 1992 (age 34); San Diego, California, U.S.
- Listed height: 6 ft 2 in (1.88 m)
- Listed weight: 241 lb (109 kg)

Career information
- High school: Granite Hills (El Cajon, California)
- College: Navy (2011–2014)
- NFL draft: 2015: 5th round, 166th overall pick

Career history
- New England Patriots (2015–2024); Miami Dolphins (2025); Los Angeles Rams (2026–present)

Awards and highlights
- 2× Super Bowl champion (LI, LIII); New England Patriots All-Dynasty Team

Career NFL statistics as of Week 8, 2026
- Games played: 184
- Total tackles: 27
- Forced fumbles: 1
- Stats at Pro Football Reference

Joseph Cardona (/kɑːrˈdoʊnə/ kar-DOH-nə; born April 16, 1992) is an American U.S. Naval Reserve officer and professional football long snapper for the Los Angeles Rams of the National Football League (NFL). He played college football for the Navy Midshipmen and was selected by the New England Patriots in the fifth round of the 2015 NFL draft.

== Early life ==
Cardona grew up in El Cajon, California, the son of Patrick and Margaret Cardona, and is of Mexican heritage. He attended Granite Hills High School, lettering two years in football and four years in lacrosse, earning conference lacrosse MVP as a senior. He graduated in 2010.

== College career ==
After high school, Cardona attended the Naval Academy Preparatory School in Newport, Rhode Island, for one year before enrolling in the Naval Academy, where he majored in economics. At Navy, he was a four-year starter in football as a long snapper, where he was not charged with a single bad snap. During his four years at Navy, the Midshipmen compiled a 30–21 record, including four wins over arch-rival Army, and played in three bowl games.

== Professional career ==
=== NFL draft ===
Pre-draft measurables
Height	Weight	Arm length	Hand span	Wingspan	40-yard dash	10-yard split	20-yard split	Vertical jump	Bench press
6 ft 1 5/8 in (1.87 m)	242 lb (110 kg)	31 1/2 in (0.80 m)	9 5/8 in (0.24 m)	6 ft 3 3/8 in (1.91 m)	4.91 s	1.70 s	2.85 s	33.0 in (0.84 m)	30 reps
All values from NFL Combine

On May 2, 2015, the New England Patriots selected Cardona in the fifth round (166th overall) of the 2015 NFL draft, making him the fourth pure long snapper to be drafted in NFL history (and the second drafted by the Patriots, after Jake Ingram). His Naval assignment was delayed until after the 2015 NFL season so that he would be able to play in the NFL.

=== New England Patriots ===
The Patriots officially signed Cardona to his rookie contract on June 4, 2015. The structure of his contract is unusual, reflecting the uncertainty of his availability in future seasons. The signing bonus of $100,000 is less than the expected bonus of about $190,000 expected for his draft slot, but he can earn $100,000 in roster bonuses if he is on the 53-man roster or an injury list at any point in 2015, 2016, and 2017 seasons.

On Thursday, September 10, in the NFL's opening game of the 2015 season, Cardona made his official debut as a long snapper in the Patriots' 28–21 win over the Pittsburgh Steelers.

On May 13, 2016, United States Secretary of the Navy Ray Mabus approved Cardona's request (and the request of Baltimore Ravens wide receiver Keenan Reynolds) to play in the NFL for the 2016 season.

For the second consecutive season, Cardona played in all 16 games for the Patriots. He was part of both Patriots' playoff wins, and went on to play in Super Bowl LI on February 5, 2017. He was a contributor to the Patriots as they defeated the Atlanta Falcons by a score of 34–28 in overtime. Cardona had an active role in the game on seven special teams plays.

In 2017 Cardona was part of both Patriots' playoff wins, and went on to play in Super Bowl LII on February 4, 2018. The Patriots failed to repeat as Super Bowl champions after losing 41–33 to the Philadelphia Eagles.

On June 14, 2018, Cardona signed a four-year contract extension with the Patriots. The Patriots reached Super Bowl LIII where they beat the Los Angeles Rams 13–3.

On December 20, 2022, it was announced that Cardona would miss the remainder of the season after suffering a torn tendon in his foot. He had suffered a partial tear in Week 14 against the Arizona Cardinals, and further injured it in Week 15 against the Las Vegas Raiders. The injury additionally broke a streak of 140 consecutive games (127 regular–season games) started by Cardona since he was drafted in 2015.

On March 21, 2023, Cardona re-signed with the Patriots on another four-year contract extension worth $6.3 million, making him the highest-paid long snapper.

On February 7, 2024, Cardona was announced as the recipient of the 13th annual Salute to Service award.

On September 2, 2024, Cardona was announced, for the first time in his career, as a team captain for the Patriots' 2024 season. In the Patriots' Week 1 win over the Cincinnati Bengals, Cardona had a forced fumble recovered by the Patriots.

On April 29, 2025, the Patriots released Cardona after 10 seasons, three days after they drafted long snapper Julian Ashby in the 2025 NFL draft. At the time, he was the longest-tenured player on the Patriots roster and the last member of the Super Bowl LIII-winning team.

=== Miami Dolphins ===
Cardona was signed by the Miami Dolphins on May 9, 2025.

=== Los Angeles Rams ===
On March 11, 2026, Cardona signed a one-year contract with the Los Angeles Rams.

== Military career ==
Joe Cardona
- Military career
- Allegiance: United States
- Branch: United States Navy
- Service years: 2015–present
- Rank: Lieutenant Commander

During his rookie season, Cardona spent his off days working a 24-hour shift as Command Duty Officer at the Naval Academy Preparatory School.

On June 7, 2019, Cardona was promoted to lieutenant in a ceremony at Gillette Stadium.

As an active member of the Navy Reserve, Cardona currently serves as department head of Maritime Expeditionary Security Squadron Eight, based at Naval Station Newport in Newport, Rhode Island. In this role, Cardona oversees the logistical needs of 500 sailors across the Eastern Seaboard.
