= Joe Andruzzi =

American football player (born 1975)

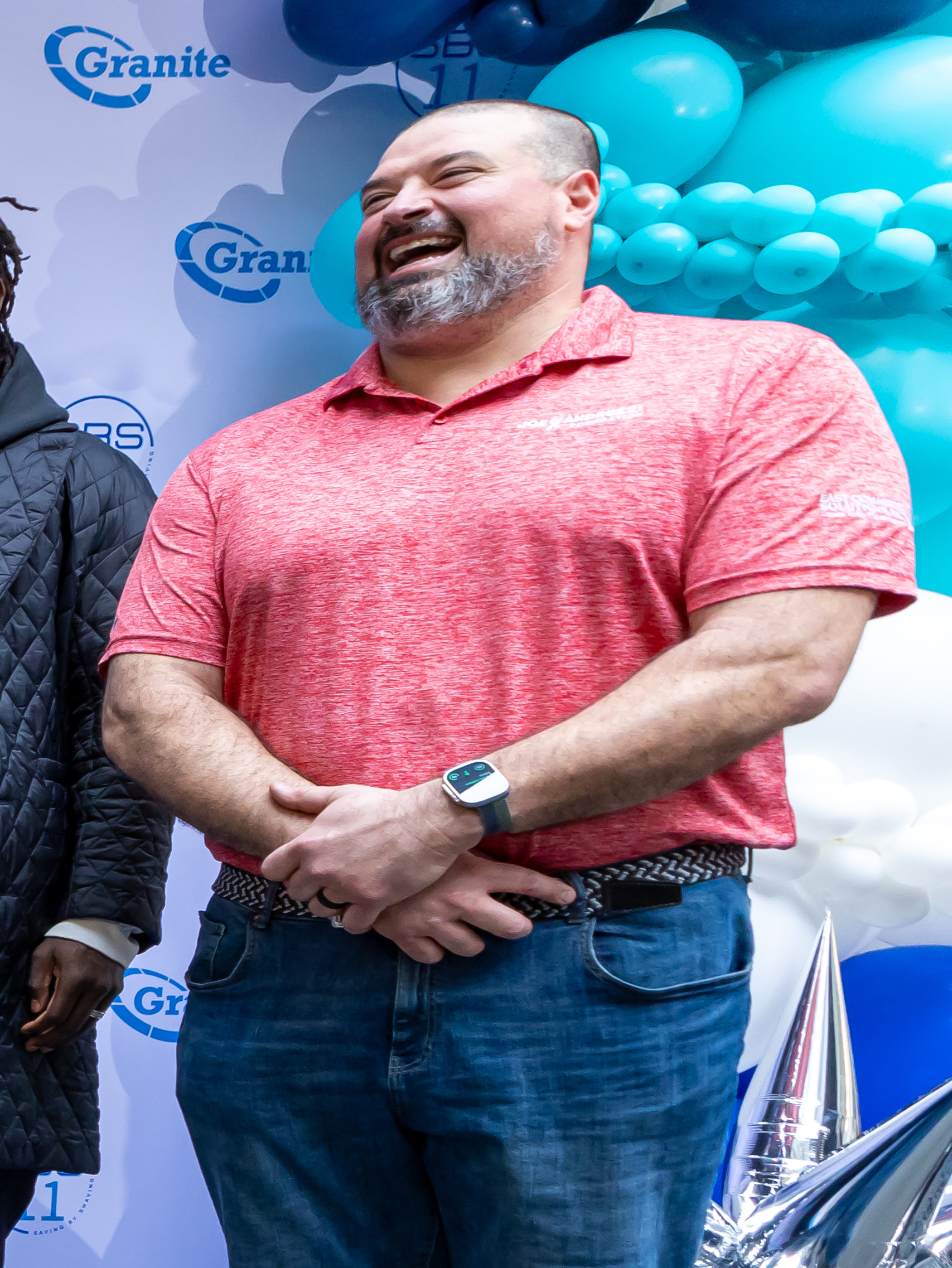
- Andruzzi in 2024

No. 70, 63
- Position: Guard

Personal information
- Born: August 23, 1975 (age 51); Brooklyn, New York, U.S.
- Listed height: 6 ft 3 in (1.91 m)
- Listed weight: 315 lb (143 kg)

Career information
- High school: Tottenville (Staten Island, New York)
- College: Southern Connecticut State
- NFL draft: 1997: undrafted

Career history
- Green Bay Packers (1997–1999); → Scottish Claymores (1998); New England Patriots (2000–2004); Cleveland Browns (2005–2006)

Awards and highlights
- 3× Super Bowl champion (XXXVI, XXXVIII, XXXIX); New England Patriots All-2000s Team; New England Patriots All-Dynasty Team; 2× All-American (1995, 1996)

Career NFL statistics
- Games played: 122
- Games started: 103
- Fumble recoveries: 4
- Stats at Pro Football Reference

Joseph Dominick Andruzzi (born August 23, 1975) is an American former professional football player who was a guard in the National Football League (NFL).

== Early life and education ==
Andruzzi was born in Brooklyn and played high school football at Tottenville High School in the Huguenot neighborhood of Staten Island, where his classmates included former Major League Baseball All-Star starting pitcher Jason Marquis and former National Football League player Adewale Ogunleye.

Andruzzi played college football at Southern Connecticut State University in New Haven, Connecticut, where he majored in special education. He played every position on the offensive line and started all four years. Andruzzi was a Division II All-American his junior and senior years as well as an offensive team captain during his senior season.

== Professional career ==
In 1997, Andruzzi was picked up as an undrafted rookie free agent by the Green Bay Packers. He was allocated by the Packers in February 1998 to play football in Scotland in the NFL Europe league. Andruzzi was released from the Packers after three seasons. He was then signed by the New England Patriots in 2000, where he played five seasons and earned three Super Bowl rings.

After becoming a free agent in 2005, he rejoined former Patriots defensive coordinator and new head coach Romeo Crennel in Cleveland, signing a 4-year deal worth $9 million. He was released two years later while the team brought in Eric Steinbach on a $49 million deal from the Bengals.

In recognition of his contributions, Andruzzi received the Ed Block Courage Award in 2002 and the first Ron Burton Community Service Award in 2003.

== Philanthropy ==
In 2001, Andruzzi and his wife, Jen, were introduced to C.J. Buckley, who had an inoperable brain tumor. The families became very close and, therefore, it was devastating when C.J. died late in 2002. The couple launched the C.J. Buckley Brain Cancer Research Fund at Boston Children's Hospital in Boston.

On May 30, 2007, Andruzzi was diagnosed with non-Hodgkin's Burkitt lymphoma, predicted to double in size in just 24 hours. The family relocated back to New England where Andruzzi had an aggressive form of chemotherapy treatment over three months at Dana–Farber Cancer Institute and Brigham and Women's Hospital. Andruzzi's last treatment was on August 6, 2007, and he then spent the following year at home in recovery.

After completing treatment, the Andruzzi family founded the Joe Andruzzi Foundation in 2008. They are committed to tackling cancer's impact by providing financial assistance for patients and their families as well as funding pediatric brain cancer research. Andruzzi received the 2015 Man of the Year award from the Walter Camp Football Foundation.

== Personal life ==
Andruzzi has three brothers, each of whom are members of the New York City Fire Department who responded to the September 11 attacks on the World Trade Center. During pregame introductions at the next game on September 23, Andruzzi ran out with an American flag in each hand. His brothers were honored at midfield prior to kickoff.

On April 15, 2013, Andruzzi's foundation was hosting an event at a restaurant on Boylston Street in Boston when the Boston Marathon bombing occurred; the second bomb detonated directly outside the restaurant. In the aftermath, he was photographed carrying an injured woman. Andruzzi's friend, former Patriots linebacker Matt Chatham, was also present, and uninjured.
