= Richard Seymour =

American poker player and football player (born 1979)

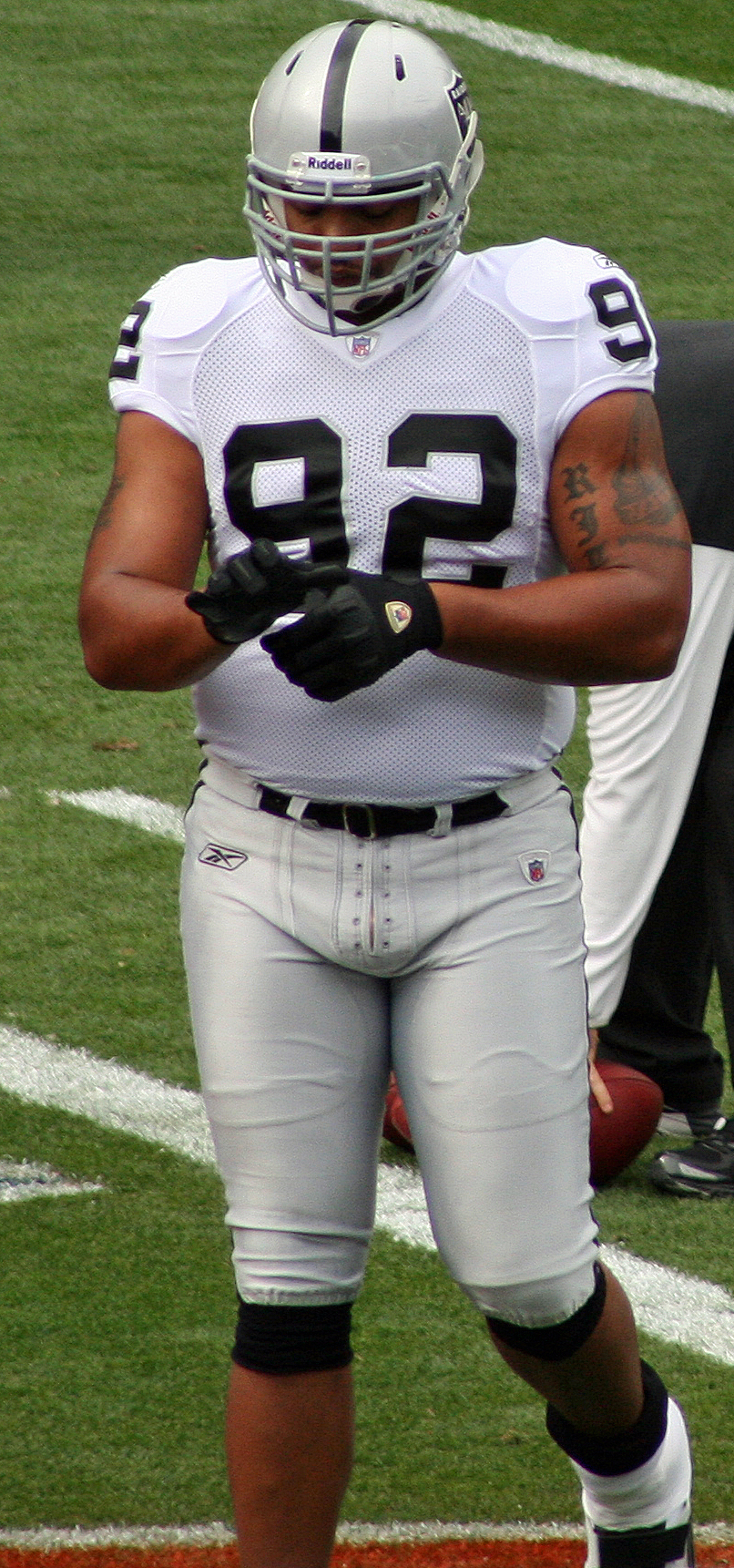
- Seymour with the Oakland Raiders in 2010

No. 93, 92
- Position: Defensive end

Personal information
- Born: October 6, 1979 (age 47); Gadsden, South Carolina, U.S.
- Listed height: 6 ft 6 in (1.98 m)
- Listed weight: 317 lb (144 kg)

Career information
- High school: Lower Richland (Hopkins, South Carolina)
- College: Georgia (1997–2000)
- NFL draft: 2001: 1st round, 6th overall pick

Career history
- New England Patriots (2001–2008); Oakland Raiders (2009–2012)

Awards and highlights
- 3× Super Bowl champion (XXXVI, XXXVIII, XXXIX); 3× First-team All-Pro (2003–2005); 2× Second-team All-Pro (2006, 2011); 7× Pro Bowl (2002–2006, 2010, 2011); NFL 2000s All-Decade Team; PFWA All-Rookie Team (2001); New England Patriots All-2000s Team; New England Patriots 50th Anniversary Team; New England Patriots All-Dynasty Team; New England Patriots Hall of Fame; First-team All-American (2000); 2× First-team All-SEC (1999, 2000)

Career NFL statistics
- Total tackles: 498
- Sacks: 57.5
- Forced fumbles: 4
- Fumble recoveries: 8
- Interceptions: 2
- Defensive touchdowns: 1
- Stats at Pro Football Reference
- Pro Football Hall of Fame

Richard Vershaun Seymour (born October 6, 1979) is an American former professional football player who was a defensive end in the National Football League (NFL) for the New England Patriots and Oakland Raiders. He played college football for the Georgia Bulldogs, and was drafted by the Patriots sixth overall in the 2001 NFL draft.

Seymour played in seven Pro Bowls, was named to five All-Pro teams, and was a member of three Super Bowl-winning Patriots teams. During his career, Seymour was considered to be one of the best defensive linemen in the NFL. Seymour was elected into the Pro Football Hall of Fame in 2022.

Seymour was selected to the Pro Bowl both as a 3-4 defensive end and as a 4-3 defensive tackle. He occasionally played fullback on short yardage and goal line situations. However, it was stopped when he suffered a knee injury on a one-yard Corey Dillon touchdown run against the San Diego Chargers in October 2005. After his football career, he became a professional poker player.

== Early life ==
At Lower Richland High School in Hopkins, South Carolina, Seymour won first team All-Region honors, first team all-area honor. As a senior, he was voted the team's best defensive lineman, was a team captain, won an All-Area Player of the Week award, led his team to four All-Area Team of the Week honors, and finished the season with 8 sacks and 83 tackles.

== College career ==
Seymour attended the University of Georgia, where he played for the Bulldogs from 1997 to 2000. He was part of a defensive line that consisted of four future first-round draft picks: Seymour, former Jacksonville Jaguars defensive tackle Marcus Stroud, New Orleans Saints defensive end Charles Grant, and former Patriots teammate Johnathan Sullivan.

A housing and consumer economics major, Seymour was a four-year letterman at Georgia who played in 41 games for the Bulldogs, starting 25. He finished his career with 223 tackles (106 solos), 9.5 sacks, 25.5 tackles for losses and 35 quarterback pressures.

He was a first-team All-Southeastern Conference selection in 1999 and 2000. As a senior, Seymour was named a first-team All-American by the American Football Coaches Association and Walter Camp Football Foundation.

Seymour appeared in nine games during his 1997 freshman year at right defensive tackle, made two tackles and had a quarterback pressure. He also appeared in every game in 1998 as a sophomore and made 4 starts, finishing fourth on the team with 69 tackles (32 solos), 4 sacks and 14 quarterback pressures.

In 1999, as a junior, Seymour started all 11 games at right defensive tackle and led the team with 74 tackles (38 solos), including 10 tackles-for-loss, four sacks and seven quarterback pressures. He also intercepted a pass. He was named SEC defensive player of the week for his performance against the South Carolina Gamecocks. In that contest he collected six tackles (5 solos), including a pair of sacks, three stops for minus 12 yards and a pressure that resulted in an interception in a 24–6 victory.

As a senior, Seymour started ten games at right defensive tackle, recording 78 tackles (35 solos) and a team-leading 10.5 tackles for loss, and 1-1/2 sacks plus 13 quarterback pressures. He earned SEC player of the week honors following his performance versus the Tennessee Volunteers.

== Professional career ==
=== New England Patriots ===
==== 2001–02 ====
Seymour was drafted by the Patriots in the first round (sixth overall) of the 2001 NFL draft. On July 24, 2001, the Patriots signed Seymour to a six-year, $14.3 million contract. He played in 13 games in his 2001 rookie season, starting 10 of them, amassing three sacks mainly as a 4-3 defensive tackle. Seymour missed the season opener against the Cincinnati Bengals as well as two late October games with a leg injury. In Super Bowl XXXVI, Seymour started at defensive tackle and earned a Super Bowl ring for the Patriots' victory over the St. Louis Rams.

The 2002 season saw Seymour starting all 16 games at 4-3 defensive tackle in his second season in the NFL, collecting 5.5 sacks and an interception en route to his first Pro Bowl appearance. Seymour also had a presence on special teams, blocking field goals in back-to-back November games against the Oakland Raiders and Minnesota Vikings.

==== 2003–04 ====
With the Patriots defense moving to a 3–4 in 2003, Seymour moved outside to defensive end in the scheme and was also named a defensive team captain for the first time in his career. Despite missing a game against the Denver Broncos in October due to a leg injury, Seymour finished with a career-high eight sacks and 57 tackles in 15 games played (14 starts). He was twice named AFC Special Teams Player of the Week, after blocked field goals against the Miami Dolphins in week 7 and the Tennessee Titans in the divisional playoffs. Seymour and the Patriots would go to win their second championship in three years, defeating the Carolina Panthers in Super Bowl XXXVIII.

Seymour was elected to the 2004 Pro Bowl and was a first-team All-Pro selection following the season.

Seymour started all 15 games he played in during the 2004 season, but missed the final regular season and first two playoff games against the Indianapolis Colts and Pittsburgh Steelers after injuring the MCL in his right knee in week 16. He also recorded the first touchdown of his career on a 68-yard fumble return against the Buffalo Bills in week 4. Seymour's tackle and sack numbers dipped slightly from the previous season to 39 tackles and five sacks, but he was still named to his third consecutive Pro Bowl and was again a first-team All-Pro choice. Seymour earned his third Super Bowl win with a Patriots victory over the Philadelphia Eagles in Super Bowl XXXIX, a game he started.

==== 2005–08 ====
Entering the final year of his rookie contract, Seymour held out of the 2005 offseason minicamps and missed the first four days of training camp in hopes of securing a new contract. While the Patriots did not fulfill Seymour's request, they did give him a pay raise for the 2005 season in order to end his holdout. In April 2006, Seymour signed a three-year, $30 million contract extension through the 2009 season.

Seymour's 2005 season began with the defensive end recording two sacks and averaging more than five tackles in the first four games before suffering a left knee injury playing fullback in a goal line situation against the San Diego Chargers in week 4. He missed the next four games, returning on November 13. Seymour finished the season with four sacks and 46 tackles, and was named to his third-consecutive first-team All-Pro team as well as his fourth consecutive Pro Bowl, but did not play due to injury.

The 2006 season was the third consecutive in which Seymour endured an injury; a left elbow injury suffered in week 7 lingered throughout the season and cost Seymour a start in week 8, but Seymour still appeared in all 16 regular season games and the playoffs. Seymour was fined $7,500 by the NFL for stepping on Indianapolis Colts offensive tackle Tarik Glenn during a November 5, 2006, game. Seymour was reportedly angered that Glenn was diving for his knees. Regardless, Seymour professed his regret for the incident and stated he would apologize to Glenn at their next meeting. Seymour, who also had a groin injury and admitted he was not 100 percent, tallied four sacks, 40 tackles, and a blocked field goal on the season. He was named to the 2007 Pro Bowl, his fifth straight, and was a second-team All-Pro selection. However, he did not play in the Pro Bowl for the second straight season.

In the 2007 offseason, Seymour had surgery on the left knee he had originally injured more than two years prior, an injury he said had hampered his conditioning and play during the 2005 and 2006 seasons. The surgery kept Seymour out of training camp and the preseason, and eventually the Patriots decided to keep Seymour on the Physically Unable to Perform list, keeping him out at least the first six weeks of the regular season. Seymour was activated from the PUP on October 27, and played the balance of the regular season and the playoffs, including Super Bowl XLII, a loss to the New York Giants. Recording 23 tackles and 1.5 sacks, Seymour was not named to the Pro Bowl or the All-Pro team for the first time since his rookie season.

The 2008 season proved to be a much healthier one for Seymour, who started the first 15 games, only to miss the season finale against the Buffalo Bills with a back injury.

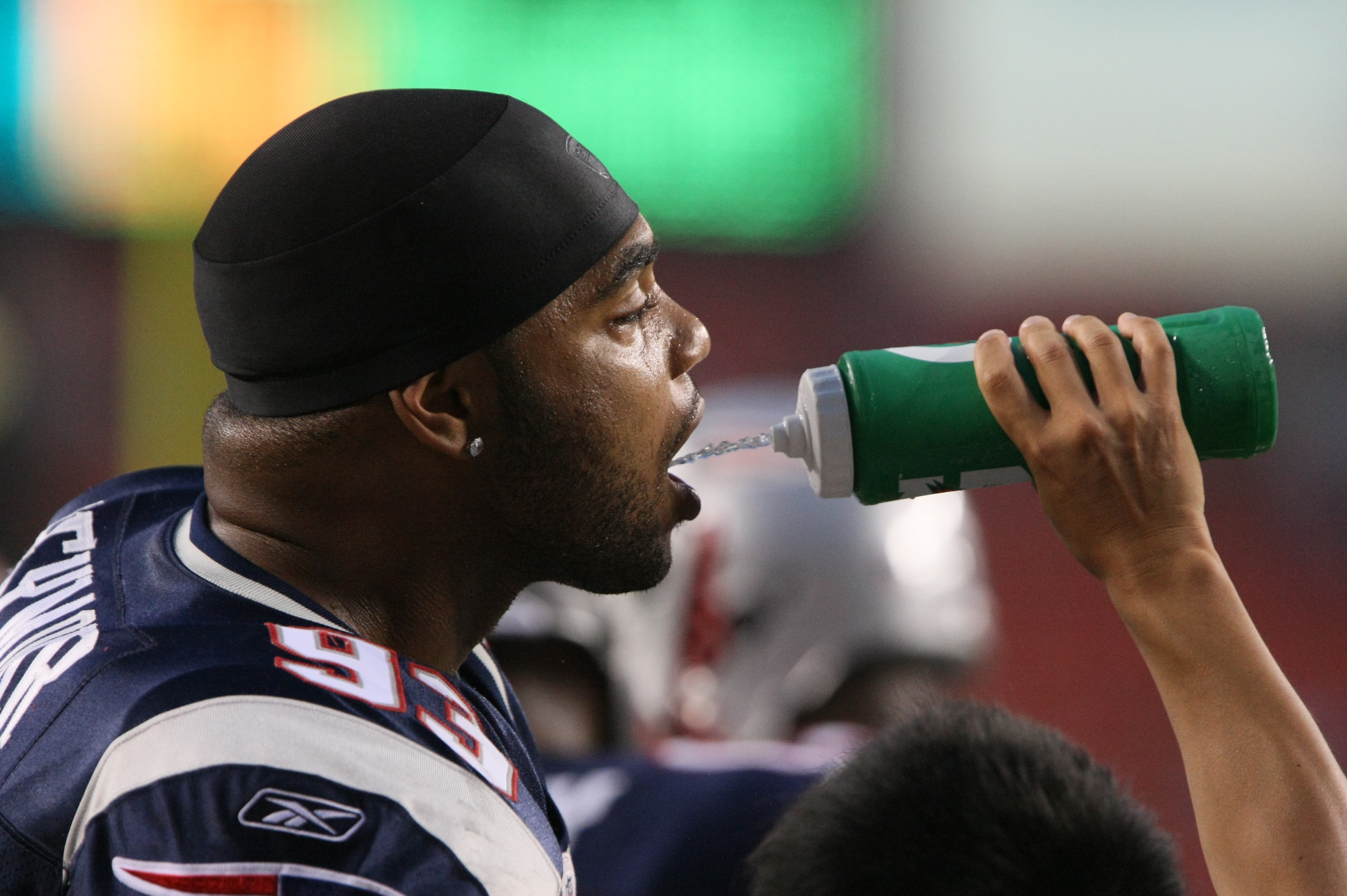
Seymour with the Patriots in August 2009. He would soon be traded to the Raiders just days later.

=== Oakland Raiders ===
==== 2009 season ====
On September 6, 2009, the Patriots traded Seymour, who was entering the final year of his contract, to the Oakland Raiders for a first-round pick in the 2011 NFL draft that the Patriots would use to select Nate Solder. Seymour refused to report to the Raiders in the days following the trade, reportedly unhappy about being traded to the team.

The Boston Herald, Boston Globe, and National Football Post all claimed that on or before September 10, the Raiders sent Seymour a formal letter ordering him to report within five days or risk being placed on the reserve/left squad list, which would prevent him from playing for any team in 2009, and thus would prevent him from achieving free agency until he played out his contract in 2010. The Herald reported that Seymour was in fact in possession of that letter. The next day, on September 11, he was placed on the team's exempt/left squad list.

On September 12, the Globe reported Seymour reported to the Raiders after the Herald had reported that Seymour felt "blindsided" by the trade. Seymour said there were "personal issues" concerning his family and that an NFLPA grievance filed on his behalf, which claimed the Raiders were not allowed to send him a five-day letter, was a "procedural thing." The NFLPA dropped the grievance shortly after, calling it a "moot point." He did report to the team on September 12, and started in the team's first game on September 14 in which he recorded six tackles and sacked Chargers quarterback Philip Rivers twice. He went on to start all 16 games of the 2009 NFL season, recording 47 tackles and four sacks on the year.

==== 2010 season ====
On February 24, 2010, the Raiders gave Seymour the franchise tag. The Raiders and Seymour negotiated a long-term contract, but Seymour opted to sign a one-year deal worth $12.4 million on June 19, 2010.

Throughout the 2010 NFL season, he was a starting left defensive tackle next to Tommy Kelly on the Raiders defensive line. He was ejected during a game in Pittsburgh on November 21 for punching Steelers QB Ben Roethlisberger. He was later fined $25,000 for his actions. For his play, Seymour was selected to his sixth career Pro Bowl, but did not play due to a hamstring injury and was replaced by Kyle Williams. He was ranked 66th by his fellow players on the NFL Top 100 Players of 2011.

==== 2011 season ====
On February 17, 2011, Seymour agreed to a two-year, $30 million contract extension, making him the highest paid defensive player in the NFL. On opening day of the 2011 NFL season, still at left defensive tackle next to Tommy Kelly, he recorded 2 sacks and 3 tackles as the Raiders defeated the Denver Broncos. He recorded 29 tackles and 6 sacks during the season. Seymour was one of four Raiders selected to attend the 2012 Pro Bowl.

==== 2012 season ====
On November 2, Seymour was fined $15,750 for hitting his former teammate, Kansas City Chiefs quarterback Matt Cassel.

On February 8, 2013, the Raiders voided the rest of Seymour's contract, effectively making him a free agent. The contract stipulated if Seymour did not meet a certain amount of allotted playing time the Raiders would have the option of voiding the final year of the deal. Due to an injury, he missed the final eight games of 2012 and was not able to meet the required amount of playing time. He was set to make $19.12 million in 2013; he counted as $13.71 million of dead money for 2013. After he became a free agent, he drew interests and received offers from multiple teams but was mostly tied to the Atlanta Falcons. It was reported that if he was unable to get the contract he was seeking he would retire.

== NFL career statistics ==
Legend
	Won the Super Bowl
**Bold**	Career high

Year	Team	GP	Tackles				Fumbles				Interceptions					
Year	Team	GP	Cmb	Solo	Ast	Sck	FF	FR	Yds	TD	Int	Yds	Avg	Lng	TD	PD
2001	NE	13	44	25	19	3.0	0	1	0	0	0	0	0.0	0	0	1
2002	NE	16	56	33	23	5.5	0	1	0	0	1	6	6.0	6	0	3
2003	NE	15	57	34	23	8.0	1	0	0	0	0	0	0.0	0	0	8
2004	NE	15	39	24	15	5.0	1	1	68	1	0	0	0.0	0	0	0
2005	NE	12	46	35	11	4.0	1	1	0	0	0	0	0.0	0	0	4
2006	NE	16	40	22	18	4.0	0	1	0	0	1	0	0.0	0	0	8
2007	NE	9	23	15	8	1.5	0	0	0	0	0	0	0.0	0	0	1
2008	NE	15	52	35	17	8.0	0	1	0	0	0	0	0.0	0	0	1
2009	OAK	16	47	30	17	4.0	1	0	0	0	0	0	0.0	0	0	3
2010	OAK	13	48	36	12	5.5	0	1	13	0	0	0	0.0	0	0	2
2011	OAK	16	29	23	6	6.0	0	0	0	0	0	0	0.0	0	0	3
2012	OAK	8	15	12	3	3.0	0	1	0	0	0	0	0.0	0	0	1
Total		164	496	324	172	57.5	4	8	81	1	2	6	3.0	6	0	35

== Award and honors ==
=== NFL ===
- 3× Super Bowl champion (XXXVI, XXXVIII, XXXIX)
- 3× First-team All-Pro (2003–2005)
- 2× Second-team All-Pro (2006, 2011)
- 7× Pro Bowl (2002–2006, 2010, 2011)
- NFL 2000s All-Decade Team
- PFWA All-Rookie Team (2001)
- Ranked No. 66 in the Top 100 Players of 2011
- New England Patriots All-2000s Team
- New England Patriots 50th Anniversary Team
- New England Patriots All-Dynasty Team
- New England Patriots Hall of Fame

=== College ===
- First-team All-American (2000)
- 2× First-team All-SEC (1999, 2000)

== Other endeavors ==
=== Poker ===
Richard Seymour
- Born: October 6, 1979 (age 47)

World Series of Poker
- Bracelet: None
- Money finish: 1
- Highest WSOP Main Event finish: 131st

World Poker Tour
- Title: None
- Final table: None
- Money finish: None

Seymour currently plays professional poker as a hobby. Seymour was a participant in the 2019 World Series of Poker main event, finishing 131st. He finished 284th in the 2023 World Series of Poker main event.

=== Las Vegas Raiders ownership ===
In October 2024, Seymour purchased a 0.5% stake in ownership of the Las Vegas Raiders.
