= Buena Vista High School (Colorado) =

Location
- 559 South Railroad Street; Buena Vista, Colorado 81211; United States
- Coordinates: 38°50′10″N 106°7′37″W

Information
- School type: Public high school
- School district: Buena Vista R-31
- CEEB code: 060155
- NCES School ID: 080264000157
- Principal: Elizabeth Barnaby
- Teaching staff: 22.63 (on an FTE basis)
- Grades: 9–12
- Enrollment: 256 (2024–2025)
- Student to teacher ratio: 11.31
- Colors: Red and white
- Athletics conference: CHSAA
- Mascot: Demon
- Feeder schools: Buena Vista Middle School
- Website: www.bvschools.org/page/buena-vista-high-school

Buena Vista High School is a public secondary school in Buena Vista, Colorado, United States. It is one of two high schools in the Buena Vista School District.

== Notable alumni ==
- Mason Finley, current holder of the national high school discus record, 2017 world championships bronze medalist
- Matt Hemingway, 2004 Olympic medalist in high jump
- Nate Solder, football player; 2011 first round pick, New England Patriots
