= 1962 San Diego Chargers season =

NFL team season

- Owner: Barron Hilton
- General manager: Sid Gillman
- Head coach: Sid Gillman
- Home stadium: Balboa Stadium

Results
- Record: 4–10
- Division place: 3rd Western Division
- Playoffs: Did not qualify
- All-AFL: 4: LB Chuck Allen (2nd team); CB Dick Harris (2nd team); TE Dave Kocourek (2nd team); T Ron Mix (1st team)
- AFL All-Stars: 9: TE Reggie Carolan; DE Earl Faison; LB Emil Karas; TE Dave Kocourek; DT Ernie Ladd; RB Keith Lincoln; LB Paul Maguire; T Ron Mix; E Don Norton

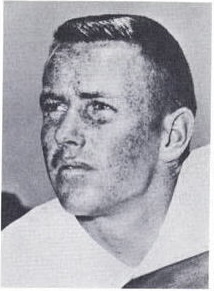
Jack Kemp's week 2 injury led to his sudden exit from San Diego

The 1962 San Diego Chargers season was the club's third in the American Football League. San Diego had won the AFL West with a 12–2 record in 1961, but slipped to 4–10, losing eight of their final nine games after a 3–2 start. It was their worst record to date; this would be the only time the Chargers would endure a losing season during their 10 years in the AFL.

Injuries on offense contributed to the slump. Promising rookie flanker Lance Alworth missed the final ten games of the season with a knee injury, Paul Lowe broke an arm and missed the entire year, and quarterback Jack Kemp was knocked out of action after only two games with a broken finger. Kemp was surprisingly placed on waivers after his injury. He was claimed by the Buffalo Bills for $100, leaving the Chargers with only rookie quarterbacks to call on for the rest of the year.

== Offseason ==
=== AFL draft ===
The 1962 AFL draft took place on December 2, 1961, late in the previous season. There were 34 rounds – previous trades had given the Chargers five extra picks, for 39 in total.

Future Hall of Fame receiver Lance Alworth came to the Chargers via this draft, though he was originally selected by the Oakland Raiders in the 2nd round. Raiders General Manager Wesley Fry revealed that prior to the draft, the Chargers had agreed to trade four players for Oakland's 2nd round pick, on the understanding that Alworth would be the player selected. Three of the players the Raiders received were Bo Roberson, Hunter Enis and Gene Selawski – the fourth was not announced. San Diego still had to outbid the San Francisco 49ers for Alworth's signature, the NFL club having selected him in the 1st round of their draft. On January 1, 1962, Alworth chose San Diego. San Francisco president Vic Morabito stated that Alworth had requested a "no cut, no-trade" contract, which was against club policy.

Alworth was a college running back who was enthused by the opportunity to catch the ball at the pro level, which fit in with San Diego's plan to use him as a receiver; he has credited Chargers receiver coach Al Davis with recruiting him. Head coach Sid Gillman inserted the rookie into the Charger line-up in week 1 – though Alworth was knocked out by injury early on in 1962, he would remain with San Diego through the 1970 season, accumulating over 9,000 yards receiving.

Two other draftees had even longer careers in San Diego. 3rd-round pick John Hadl was a versatile player who had earned All-American honors both as a halfback in 1960 and as a quarterback in 1961. It was the latter role that Chargers chief scout Don Klosterman envisioned him playing – Hadl, who preferred the quarterback position, has cited this as a reason for choosing the Chargers over the NFL's Detroit Lions, as well as the opportunity to start sooner and the city of San Diego itself. Immediately after leading the Kansas Jayhawks to victory in the Bluebonnet Bowl, Hadl met Klosterman at the 20-yard line to sign a four-year contract with the Chargers, saying, "it's a young club and I feel I'll have more opportunity." An injury to starting quarterback Jack Kemp saw Hadl start ten games during his rookie year – he lost nine of them, but would greatly improve during an 11-year stint in San Diego. Sam Gruneisen, a 25th-round pick, was also a Charger for 11 years, playing both guard and center.

Other successfully-signed draftees included linebackers Bob Mitinger (five seasons as a Charger), Frank Buncom (six seasons as a Charger, three All-Star games), and halfback/tight end Jacque MacKinnon (nine season as a Charger, two All-star games).

Including Alworth, the Chargers signed twelve of their 1962 draft class, while twelve signed for NFL clubs.

1962 San Diego Chargers draft
Round	Pick	Player	Position	College	Notes
1	8	Bob Ferguson	Fullback	Ohio State	5th pick in NFL draft; signed by Pittsburgh Steelers
2	16	Dick Hudson	Tackle	Memphis	
3	24	John Hadl *	Quarterback	Kansas	10th pick in NFL draft
4	31	Bob Bill	Tackle	Notre Dame	26th pick in NFL draft
4	32	Mack Burton	Halfback	San Jose State	57th pick in NFL draft; signed by British Columbia Lions
5	34	Bob Mitinger	Linebacker	Penn State	29th pick in NFL draft
5	40	John Cornett	Tackle	Rice	33rd pick in NFL draft
6	42	Roy Winston	Linebacker	Louisiana State	45th pick in NFL draft; signed by Minnesota Vikings
6	48	Frank Buncom *	Linebacker	USC	
7	51	Wendell Harris	Defensive back	Louisiana State	9th pick in NFL draft; signed by Baltimore Colts
7	56	Bobby Jackson	Fullback	New Mexico State	19th pick in NFL draft
8	64	Jerry Robinson	Flanker	Grambling State	147th pick in NFL draft
9	72	Tom Minter	Defensive back	Baylor	19th pick in NFL draft; traded to Buffalo Bills
10	80	Dan Sullivan	Guard	Boston College	37th pick in NFL draft; signed by Baltimore Colts
11	88	Sonny Bishop *	Guard	Fresno State	249th pick in NFL draft; traded to Dallas Texans
12	93	Ralph Smith	Tight end	Mississippi	111th pick in NFL draft; signed by Philadelphia Eagles
12	96	George Andrie *	Defensive end	Marquette	82nd pick in NFL draft; signed by Dallas Cowboys
13	104	Chuck Bryant	End	Ohio State	34th pick in NFL draft; signed by St. Louis Cardinals
14	112	Jim Bates	Halfback	USC	32nd pick in NFL draft
15	120	Fred Moore	Defensive tackle	Memphis	135th pick in NFL draft; made the Chargers' roster in 1964
16	128	George Gross	Defensive tackle	Auburn	103rd pick in NFL draft
17	136	Frank Gardner	Tackle	North Carolina Central	179th pick in NFL draft
18	144	Dennis Biodrowski	Guard	Memphis	221st pick in NFL draft; traded to Kansas City Chiefs
19	152	Mike Lind	Fullback	Notre Dame	64th pick in NFL draft; signed by San Francisco 49ers
20	160	Ron Herman	Quarterback	Bradley	
21	168	Jesse Williams	Center	Fresno State	138th pick in NFL draft; signed by British Columbia Lions
22	176	Jim Thibert	Linebacker	Toledo	Signed by 1963 Toledo Tornadoes (UFL)
23	184	Dick Farris	Guard	North Texas	100th pick in NFL draft
24	192	Homer Jones *	Halfback	Texas Southern	Declared ineligible in 1962; Chargers did not retain signing rights
25	200	Sam Gruneisen	Center	Villanova	
26	208	Mike Woulfe	Linebacker	Colorado	208th pick in NFL draft; signed by Philadelphia Eagles
27	216	Mel Rideout	Quarterback	Richmond	247th pick in NFL draft
28	224	Ben Wilson	Fullback	USC	68th pick in NFL draft; signed by Los Angeles Rams
29	232	Paul Dudley	Halfback	Arkansas	54th pick in NFL draft; signed by New York Giants
30	240	John Denvir	Guard	Colorado	166th pick in NFL draft; traded to Denver Broncos
31	248	Doug Elmore	Halfback	Mississippi	171st pick in NFL draft; signed by Washington Redskins
32	256	Wayne Frazier	Center	Auburn	216th pick in 1961 NFL draft
33	264	Jacque MacKinnon *	Halfback	Colgate	280th pick in NFL draft
34	272	Phil Lohmann	Center	Oklahoma	195th pick in NFL draft; signed by Calgary Stampeders
Made roster * Made at least one AFL All-Star game or NFL Pro Bowl during career Played in the NFL in 1962

=== Departures and arrivals ===
A significant exit occurred early in the regular season, with Jack Kemp's move to Buffalo. Kemp suffered a broken finger in his throwing hand during a week 2 game against the Titans, though he played through the injury and finished the game. On September 25, nine days after his injury, Kemp was placed on waivers by Sid Gillman and claimed by the Bills for $100. Gillman's action has been described as either a deliberate decision, a calculated risk that backfired, or a simple misunderstanding of the rules. At the time, Gillman stated that he thought Kemp wouldn't be claimed due to his injury, but he was later quoted as saying that the Chargers "could not win consistently" with Kemp. Several Chargers expressed shock at the move; Kemp himself said that his feelings had been hurt, and he unsure whether he would report to Buffalo, or retire instead.

During his time with the Chargers, Kemp was 22–6 as a starter in the regular season, though he had struggled in two title game defeats, throwing no touchdowns and six interceptions. He ultimately did report to Buffalo, and was part of the Bills teams who beat San Diego in the AFL title games of 1964 and 1965.

As well as the players sent to Oakland for the signing rights of Alworth, the Chargers used further trades to secure future draft picks. Fullback Charlie Flowers went to New York, while safety Bob Zeman (who had intercepted eight passes in 1961) joined receivers Luther Hayes and Bob Scarpitto in being traded to Denver. Offensive linemen Sam DeLuca and Orlando Ferrante both retired, the latter after being traded.

Tight end Reggie Carolan, a draftee from the previous year, joined the team in 1962. He caught only three passes, but blocked well enough to make the AFL All-Star game as a rookie. Pat Shea went undrafted, but was given a try-out after his aggressive style during practice impressed offensive line coach Joe Madro. He signed a contract for $8,000 a year, and would start every game at right guard during the Chargers' title-winning 1963 season.

Fullback Gerry McDougall arrived late in the season, after his CFL team, the Toronto Argonauts, failed to make the playoffs. He passed up a slightly higher offer from the Giants so that he could play in his home state of California. McDougall also informed Gillman that Argonauts quarterback Tobin Rote might be interested in a move south of the border – this began the process that would see Rote become the Chargers' starting quarterback in 1963.

== Personnel ==
=== Staff ===
1962 San Diego Chargers staff
Front office: Owner – Barron Hilton; General manager – Sid Gillman; Director of personnel – Don Klosterman; Head coaches: Head coach – Sid Gillman; Offensive coaches: End coach – Al Davis; Offensive line coach – Joe Madro	Defensive coaches: Defensive line coach – Walt Hackett; Defensive backfield coach – Chuck Noll

=== Roster ===
1962 San Diego Chargers roster
Quarterbacks (QB): 16 Val Keckin; 21 John Hadl; Running backs (RB): 20 Gerry McDougall; 22 Keith Lincoln; 26 Bert Coan; 38 Jacque MacKinnon; 40 Bob Jackson; Wide receivers (WR): 29 Jerry Robinson; 88 Don Norton; Tight ends (TE): 83 Dave Kocourek; 89 Reggie Carolan	Offensive linemen (OL): 52 Don Rogers C/G; 60 Jack Klotz T; 64 Pat Shea G; 65 Sam Gruneisen G/C; 70 Sherman Plunkett T; 74 Ron Mix G; 75 Ernie Wright T; 78 Dick Hudson G; Defensive linemen (DL): 76 Henry Schmidt DE/DT; 77 Ernie Ladd DT; 79 Bill Hudson DT; 80 Ron Nery DE; 86 Earl Faison DE	Linebackers (LB): 50 Chuck Allen MLB; 55 Frank Buncom OLB; 56 Emil Karas OLB; 82 Robert Mitinger OLB/DE; 84 Paul Maguire OLB/P; Defensive backs (DB): 25 Claude "Hoot" Gibson CB; 36 Dick Harris CB; 39 George Blair K/CB/FS; 43 Bobby Bethune FS; 47 Bud Whitehead SS; Special teams (ST)	Reserve: 19 Lance Alworth WR (IR); -- Sam DeLuca G (Retired); 51 Wayne Frazier C (IR); 23 Paul Lowe RB (IR); 27 Charlie McNeil S (IR); Rookies in italics

== Preseason ==
San Diego were a perfect four wins out of four in preseason, running their cumulative record in exhibition games to 12–0. Their first game was a 17–0 shutout of Dallas, with rushing touchdowns from rookie Bob Jackson and soon-to-be-traded Charlie Flowers. They followed up with a 31–24 win over Denver, having led 31–10 through three quarters – Keith Lincoln ran the second half kickoff back 87 yards for a touchdown, and MacKinnon scored on a 97-yard reception from Jack Kemp, who ran for two touchdowns. However, Paul Lowe fractured his right arm and missed the entire regular season.

A road trip to Oakland saw San Diego overcome five turnovers to edge the Raiders 33–27 in their new venue, Frank Youell Field. Emil Karas ran a fumble back 55 yards for a touchdown, and rookie quarterback Hadl ran in what proved to be the winning score from 11 yards out. Finally, rookie Alworth caught a pair of touchdowns from Kemp in a 14–9 win over the Titans.

1962 San Diego Chargers preseason
Week	Date	Opponent	Result	Record	Venue	Attendance
1	August 11	Dallas Texans	W 17–0	1–0	Balboa Stadium	28,555
2	August 18	Denver Broncos	W 31–24	2–0	Balboa Stadium	19,168
3	August 26	at Oakland Raiders	W 33–27	3–0	Frank Youell Field	17,053
4	September 1	New York Titans	W 14–9	4–0	Balboa Stadium	20,871

== Regular season ==
=== Summary ===
Injuries played a major role in the Chargers' campaign, with eight players missing at least half the season and twenty-three missing at least two games. On offense, running back Paul Lowe (broken arm) missed the entire regular season, Alworth (knee) the final ten games, and center Wayne Frazier (knee) the final seven.

San Diego also had to contend with Jack Kemp's surprising departure after only two games. They used three different rookies at quarterback for the remainder of the season: Hadl, Dick Wood, and Val Keckin. None of the trio posted a passer rating above 50, though Hadl did enough to secure a roster spot for the next season, throwing 15 touchdowns against 24 interceptions and passing for 1,632 yards while starting ten games. With Alworth out injured after catching three touchdowns in the opening four games, Don Norton (771 yards) and Dave Kocourek (688 yards, after switching from flanker to tight end) were the leading receivers for the second consecutive year. On the ground, Lincoln and rookie Bobby Jackson had the bulk of the carries in Lowe's absence, combining for 985 yards and seven touchdowns behind a line where tackle Ron Mix was San Diego's lone first-team All-AFL selection.

The defense didn't match their record-breaking interception haul of the previous season and ranked fourth in the eight-team league. Their two leading interceptors from 1961 were largely or entirely absent: Charlie McNeil was among the injured and missed ten games, while Bob Zeman had been traded away to Denver. In their absence, Claude Gibson led the team with eight interceptions, running one of those back for a touchdown. Rookie linemen Ernie Ladd and Earl Faison led the team in the unofficial (Note: The NFL did not keep sack statistics officially until 1982. Members of the Professional Football Researchers Association have largely reconstructed sack data from 1960 onwards based on official gamebooks, but the NFL does not acknowledge pre-1982 sack numbers.) statistic of quarterback sacks, with 9 and 5 1/2, respectively. George Blair had an outstanding year as a kicker, converting on 17 of 20 field goals. His 85% success rate was comfortably the best in the league and would stand up as the top performance through the full decade of the AFL. Paul Maguire was called upon to punt 79 times, most in the league, and ranked third with 41.6 yards per kick.

With the Chargers struggling, their average home attendance dropped by 26%, dipping below 22,000.

=== Schedule ===
Week	Date	Opponent	Result	Record	Venue	Attendance	Recap
1	September 7	at **Denver Broncos**	**L** 21–30	0–1	University of Denver Stadium	28,000	Recap
2	September 16	New York Titans	**W** 40–14	1–1	Balboa Stadium	22,003	Recap
3	September 23	Houston Oilers	**L** 17–42	1–2	Balboa Stadium	28,061	Recap
4	September 30	at **Oakland Raiders**	**W** 42–33	2–2	Frank Youell Field	13,000	Recap
5	October 7	**Dallas Texans**	**W** 32–28	3–2	Balboa Stadium	23,092	Recap
6	October 13	at Buffalo Bills	**L** 10–35	3–3	War Memorial Stadium	20,074	Recap
7	October 19	at Boston Patriots	**L** 20–24	3–4	Boston University Field	20,888	Recap
8	October 28	at New York Titans	**L** 3–23	3–5	Polo Grounds	21,467	Recap
9	November 4	**Denver Broncos**	**L** 20–23	3–6	Balboa Stadium	20,827	Recap
10	November 11	Buffalo Bills	**L** 20–40	3–7	Balboa Stadium	22,204	Recap
11	Bye						
12	November 25	at Houston Oilers	**L** 27–33	3–8	Jeppesen Stadium	28,235	Recap
13	December 2	**Oakland Raiders**	**W** 31–21	4–8	Balboa Stadium	17,874	Recap
14	December 9	Boston Patriots	**L** 14–20	4–9	Balboa Stadium	19,887	Recap
15	December 16	at **Dallas Texans**	**L** 17–26	4–10	Cotton Bowl	18,384	Recap
Note: Intra-division opponents are in **bold** text.

=== Game summaries ===
==== Week 1: at Denver Broncos ====
Week One: San Diego Chargers at Denver Broncos – Game summary

Quarter	1	2	3	4	Total
Chargers	0	7	7	7	**21**
Broncos	10	14	6	0	**30**

at Denver University Stadium, Denver, Colorado

- Date: September 7
- Game weather: 71 °F (21.7 °C), relative humidity 26%, wind 10 mph
- Game attendance: 28,000
- Box score

Game information

**First quarter**

- DEN – Gene Mingo 5-yard run (Gene Mingo kick), 6:25. Broncos 7–0. **Drive: 8 plays, 56 yards.**
- DEN – Gene Mingo 12-yard field goal, 1:31. Broncos 10–0. **Drive: 11 plays, 53 yards.**

**Second quarter**

- SDG – Don Norton 7-yard pass from Jack Kemp (George Blair kick), 10:03. Broncos 10–7. **Drive: 6 plays, 43 yards.**
- DEN – Bob Scarpitto 49-yard pass from Frank Tripucka (Gene Mingo kick), 7:26. Broncos 17–7. **Drive: 6 plays, 78 yards.**
- DEN – Bo Dickinson 2-yard pass from Frank Tripucka (Gene Mingo kick), 1:10. Broncos 24–7. **Drive: 13 plays, 75 yards.**

**Third quarter**

- DEN – Gene Mingo 41-yard field goal, 8:38. Broncos 27–7. **Drive: 8 plays, 39 yards.**
- DEN – Gene Mingo 53-yard field goal, 2:17. Broncos 30–7. **Drive: 7 plays, 23 yards.**
- SDG – Claude Gibson 37-yard interception return (George Blair kick), 0:00. Chargers 19–16.

**Fourth quarter**

- SDG – Bobby Jackson 15-yard pass from John Hadl (George Blair kick), 3:35. Chargers 19–16. **Drive: 6 plays, 54 yards.**

**Top passers**

- SDG – Jack Kemp – 8/27, 108 yards, TD, INT
- DEN – Frank Tripucka – 28/47, 376 yards, 2 TD, 2 INT

**Top rushers**

- SDG – Bobby Jackson – 9 rushes, 51 yards
- DEN – Al Frazier – 14 rushes, 72 yards

**Top receivers**

- SDG – Dave Kocourek – 4 receptions, 66 yards
- DEN – Lionel Taylor – 7 receptions, 79 yards

Denver beat the Chargers for the first time, despite a late comeback attempt. The Broncos blocked a Blair field goal attempt early on and drove 56 yards the other way for the opening touchdown. It was 10–0 in the 2nd quarter when Jack Kemp got the Chargers moving with a 17-yard completion to Alworth – the flanker's first catch as a professional – and found Norton from 7 yards out for the first Charger points of the season. Former Charger Bob Scarpitto scored only six plays later, and Denver pushed their lead to 30–7 through the middle portion of the game, while San Diego failed to cross the Bronco 30.

The Charger defense then produced a turnover: halfback Gene Mingo's pass attempt was picked off by Gibson and run back 37 yards for a touchdown. Bronco QB Frank Tripucka was also intercepted on the next two drives – after the second of these, rookie Hadl came in at quarterback and led the Chargers on a 6-play, 54-yard scoring drive, his first pass attempt being a 15-yard touchdown to Bobby Jackson with 3:35 to play. San Diego declined to try a two point conversion after either of these touchdowns, leaving them nine points behind and still needing to score twice more. In the event, Denver ran almost all of the remaining time off the clock, securing the win.

==== Week 2: vs. New York Titans ====
Week Two: New York Titans at San Diego Chargers – Game summary

Quarter	1	2	3	4	Total
Titans	0	0	0	14	**14**
Chargers	7	14	10	9	**40**

at Balboa Stadium, San Diego, California

- Date: September 16
- Game weather: 67 °F (19.4 °C), relative humidity 75%, wind 8 mph
- Game attendance: 22,003
- Box score

Game information

**First quarter**

- SDG – Jack Kemp 1-yard run (George Blair kick). Chargers 7–0.

**Second quarter**

- SDG – Lance Alworth 23-yard pass from Keith Lincoln (George Blair kick). Chargers 14–0.
- SDG – Bobby Jackson 5-yard run (George Blair kick). Chargers 21–0.

**Third quarter**

- SDG – Lance Alworth 67-yard pass from Jack Kemp (George Blair kick). Chargers 28–0.
- SDG – George Blair 44-yard field goal. Chargers 31–0.

**Fourth quarter**

- NYT – Art Powell 10-yard pass from Lee Grosscup (Dick Guesman kick). Chargers 31–7.
- SDG – Keith Lincoln 103-yard kickoff return (kick failed). Chargers 37–7.
- SDG – George Blair 30-yard field goal. Chargers 40–7.
- NYT – Art Powell 14-yard pass from Lee Grosscup (Dick Guesman kick). Chargers 40–14.

**Top passers**

- NYT – Lee Grosscup – 20/41, 216 yards, 2 TD, 3 INT
- SDG – Jack Kemp – 5/18, 184 yards, TD, INT

**Top rushers**

- NYT – Charlie Flowers – 13 rushes, 42 yards
- SDG – Keith Lincoln – 13 rushes, 48 yards

**Top receivers**

- NYT – Art Powell – 5 receptions, 75 yards, 2 TD
- SDG – Lance Alworth – 2 receptions, 90 yards, 2 TD

Alworth scored his first AFL touchdowns as the Chargers thrashed New York. Alworth had caught only one pass in his first game; he caught only two here, but both for touchdowns, covering 23 and 67 yards. Jack Kemp and Bobby Jackson also scored rushing touchdowns during the first three quarters, which saw the Chargers go up 31–0.

Halfback Lincoln had been the passer on Alworth's first touchdown; after the Titans finally scored, he ran the ensuing kickoff back 103 yards for a touchdown. He was the first Charger to score in this manner, having already become the first to achieve a punt-return touchdown the previous season. This was also a club record for longest touchdown that would not be tied until 1987, nor beaten until 2007. San Diego gained fewer first downs than the Titans (20–13) but enjoyed a 6–2 advantage in turnovers, with their defense claiming three fumbles and three interceptions.

Kemp broke his finger in this game. It was his final game with the Chargers before the Bills claimed him off waivers.

==== Week 3: vs. Houston Oilers ====
Week Three: Houston Oilers at San Diego Chargers – Game summary

Quarter	1	2	3	4	Total
Oilers	14	14	7	7	**42**
Chargers	7	3	0	7	**17**

at Balboa Stadium, San Diego, California

- Date: September 23
- Game weather: 73 °F (22.8 °C), relative humidity 67%, wind 12 mph
- Game attendance: 28,061
- Box score

Game information

**First quarter**

- HOU – Charley Hennigan 25-yard pass from George Blanda (George Blanda kick, 13:07. Oilers 7–0. **Drive: 1 play, 25 yards.**
- HOU – Billy Cannon 1-yard run (George Blanda kick), 4:14. Oilers 14–0. **Drive: 10 plays, 73 yards.**
- SDG – Don Norton 7-yard pass from Dick Wood (George Blair kick), 0:26. Oilers 14–7. **Drive: 8 plays, 80 yards.**

**Second quarter**

- HOU – Billy Cannon 10-yard run (George Blanda kick), 13:05. Oilers 21–7. **Drive: 5 plays, 69 yards.**
- SDG – George Blair 29-yard field goal, 8:43. Oilers 21–10. **Drive: 9 plays, 56 yards.**
- HOU – Billy Cannon 13-yard pass from George Blanda (George Blanda kick), 3:58. Oilers 28–10. **Drive: 7 plays, 69 yards.**

**Third quarter**

- HOU – Charley Tolar 20-yard run (George Blanda kick), 3:23. Oilers 35–10. **Drive: 6 plays, 53 yards.**

**Fourth quarter**

- HOU – Willard Dewveall 4-yard pass from Jacky Lee (George Blanda kick), 8:10. Oilers 42–17. **Drive: 9 plays, 80 yards.**
- SDG – Don Norton 22-yard pass from Dick Wood (George Blair kick), 1:23. Oilers 35–17. **Drive: 3 plays, 65 yards.**

**Top passers**

- HOU – George Blanda – 11/20, 164 yards, 2 TD, INT
- SDG – Dick Wood – 16/33, 294 yards, 2 TD, INT

**Top rushers**

- HOU – Charley Tolar – 18 rushes, 142 yards, TD
- SDG – Keith Lincoln – 10 rushes, 18 yards

**Top receivers**

- HOU – Bob McLeod – 3 receptions, 40 yards
- SDG – Dave Kocourek – 5 receptions, 140 yards

Houston ran away with this rematch of the first two AFL Championship games. Hadl was given the start, but his first pass attempt was intercepted, and George Blanda threw a touchdown one play later, putting his team ahead to stay. Dick Wood, another rookie, soon replaced Hadl and finished the game with a pair of touchdown passes, both to Norton. These were rendered irrelevant by an Oilers offense that moved the ball at will. They scored touchdowns on their first four possessions and had 432 yards, with only one turnover. Blanda finished with three touchdown passes, while his rushing attack combined for 277 yards on 42 carries, with a further three touchdowns.

Recently converted tight end Kocourek represented a bright spot for the Chargers. He caught 5 passes for 140 yards.

==== Week 4: at Oakland Raiders ====
Week Four: San Diego Chargers at Oakland Raiders – Game summary

Quarter	1	2	3	4	Total
Chargers	7	21	14	0	**42**
Raiders	7	7	3	16	**33**

at Frank Youell Field, Oakland, California

- Date: September 30
- Game weather: 64 °F (17.8 °C), relative humidity 66%, wind 9 mph
- Game attendance: 13,000
- Box score

Game information

**First quarter**

- SDG – Bobby Jackson 10-yard pass from Dick Wood (George Blair kick), 5:46. Chargers 7–0. **Drive: 5 plays, 61 yards.**
- OAK – Bo Roberson 87-yard kickoff return (Jackie Simpson kick), 5:32. Tied 7–7.

**Second quarter**

- OAK – Fred Williamson 91-yard interception return (Jackie Simpson kick), 14:35. Raiders 14–7.
- SDG – Dave Kocourek 37-yard pass from John Hadl (George Blair kick), 7:54. Tied 14–14. **Drive: 8 plays, 77 yards.**
- SDG – Don Norton 13-yard pass from John Hadl (George Blair kick), 3:10. Chargers 21–14. **Drive: 2 plays, 15 yards.**
- SDG – Lance Alworth 53-yard pass from John Hadl (George Blair kick), 1:21. Chargers 28–14. **Drive: 1 play, 53 yards.**

**Third quarter**

- OAK – Jackie Simpson 25-yard field goal, 10:18. Chargers 28–17. **Drive: 10 plays, 36 yards.**
- SDG – Bobby Jackson 6-yard run (George Blair kick), 8:55. Chargers 35–17. **Drive: 4 plays, 61 yards.''**
- SDG – Keith Lincoln 86-yard run (George Blair kick), 2:06. Chargers 42–17. **Drive: 1 play, 86 yards.**

**Fourth quarter**

- OAK – Dobie Craig 35-yard pass from Chon Gallegos (Bo Roberson run), 9:52. Chargers 42–25. **Drive: 7 plays, 53 yards.**
- OAK – Bo Roberson 32-yard pass from Chon Gallegos (John White pass from Chon Gallegos), 4:56. Chargers 42–33. **Drive: 6 plays, 48 yards.**

**Top passers**

- SDG – John Hadl – 7/14, 161 yards, 3 TD, 3 INT
- OAK – Cotton Davidson – 10/24, 95 yards, 2 INT

**Top rushers**

- SDG – Keith Lincoln – 12 rushes, 166 yards, TD
- OAK – Clem Daniels – 11 rushes, 55 yards

**Top receivers**

- SDG – Lance Alworth – 3 receptions, 66 yards, TD
- OAK – Dobie Craig – 3 receptions, 59 yards, TD

For the fifth straight time in their head-to-head series, the Chargers defeated Oakland while scoring 40+ points. Paul Maguire's interception led to the first score, a 10-yard pass from Wood to Jackson, but former Charger Bo Roberson returned the ensuing kickoff 87 yards for a game-tying score. Hadl came in at quarterback and led San Diego to a first down at the Oakland 17, but Fred Williamson picked off his next pass and went 91 yards the other way for another return touchdown.

Hadl bounced back with touchdown passes on three consecutive possessions. Firstly, he eluded tacklers and lobbed a pass to Kocourek, who took it in for a 30-yard touchdown. After Oakland prolonged the next Charger drive by fumbling a punt (Jacque McKinnon recovered), Norton caught a 13-yard touchdown over the middle. Finally, one play after a Raider punt, Alworth outran his marker and caught a deep ball for a 53-yard touchdown (his final reception of the season, as he was ruled out of the next ten games by a knee injury).

Oakland pulled three points back on the opening drive of the 2nd quarter, but Lincoln then broke off a 45-yard run, and Jackson powered through tacklers for a 6-yard touchdown on the next play. Lincoln got on the scoresheet himself later in the quarter, breaking loose from his own 14 yard line and shaking off two tacklers upfield before completing an 86-yard touchdown run. Down 42–17, the Raiders scored two touchdowns and a pair of two point conversions in the final quarter, but didn't cross midfield after that.

Lincoln had his first 100-yard game, carrying 12 times for 166 yards and a touchdown.

==== Week 5: vs. Dallas Texans ====
Week Five: Dallas Texans at San Diego Chargers – Game summary

Quarter	1	2	3	4	Total
Texans	0	14	0	14	**28**
Chargers	9	14	0	9	**32**

at Balboa Stadium, San Diego, California

- Date: October 7
- Game weather: 64 °F (17.8 °C), relative humidity 67%, wind 7 mph
- Game attendance: 23,092
- Box score

Game information

**First quarter**

- SDG – George Blair 10-yard field goal, 10:24. Chargers 3–0. **Drive: 7 plays, 60 yards.**
- SDG – John Hadl 4-yard run (kick failed), 3:28. Chargers 9–0. **Drive: 8 plays, 72 yards.**

**Second quarter**

- SDG – Don Norton 14-yard pass from John Hadl (George Blair kick), 12:19. Chargers 16–0. **Drive: 5 plays, 36 yards.**
- DAL – Frank Jackson 1-yard run (Tommy Brooker kick), 9:23. Chargers 16–7. **Drive: 1 play, 24 yards.**
- SDG – Jerry Robinson 33-yard pass from John Hadl (George Blair kick), 5:25. Chargers 23–7. **Drive: 2 plays, 30 yards.**
- DAL – Abner Haynes 46-yard pass from Len Dawson (Tommy Brooker kick), 4:27. Chargers 23–14. **Drive: 3 plays, 73 yards.**

**Third quarter**

- No scoring plays.

**Fourth quarter**

- SDG – George Blair 27-yard field goal, 12:04. Chargers 26–14. **Drive: 5 plays, 12 yards.**
- SDG – Keith Lincoln 2-yard run (kick failed), 2:44. Chargers 32–14. **Drive: 15 plays, 56 yards.**
- DAL – Abner Haynes 14-yard pass from Len Dawson (Tommy Brooker kick), 1:18. Chargers 32–21. **Drive: 5 plays, 49 yards.**
- DAL – Chris Burford 12-yard pass from Len Dawson (Tommy Brooker kick), 0:45. Chargers 32–28. **Drive: 2 plays, 48 yards.**

**Top passers**

- DAL – Len Dawson – 12/24, 156 yards, 3 TD, 2 INT
- SDG – John Hadl – 14/29, 208 yards, 2 TD

**Top rushers**

- DAL – Abner Haynes – 6 rushes, 33 yards
- SDG – Keith Lincoln – 19 rushes, 85 yards, TD

**Top receivers**

- DAL – Abner Haynes – 5 receptions, 92 yards, 2 TD
- SDG – Jerry Robinson – 3 receptions, 86 yards, TD

San Diego survived a late scare to beat the eventual AFL Champions. Dick Wood threw a 36-yard completion on the game's first play but was knocked out of the game with an injury, and Hadl played the rest of the way. Blair kicked a 10-yard chip shot at the end of that opening possession, and Hadl led a 72-yard touchdown drive the next time the Chargers had the ball, completing a 36-yard pass to Norton and running the ball in himself on 3rd and goal from the 4. The Chargers recovered a fumble in the 2nd quarter, and Hadl found Norton five plays later for a 16–0 lead. The Texans also scored after a fumble recovery but extended the Chargers' answering drive with a roughing the punter penalty. Jerry Robinson caught a touchdown two plays later, from 33 yards. A Len Dawson touchdown pass made it 23–14 at halftime.

The first six possessions of the second half ended in punts, the last of these a 17-yard effort that set the Chargers up on the Dallas 33. They converted this chance into a field goal, and Gibson intercepted Dawson two plays later. Hadl converted a 4th and inches himself on the ensuing drive, and Lincoln's 2-yard run made it 32–14 with only 2:44 to play. Dawson then threw two touchdowns on either side of a successful onside kick, drawing within four points with 45 seconds still left. Only when the Chargers recovered a second onside attempt was the victory assured.

Hadl completed 14 of 29 for 208 yards, two touchdowns, and no interceptions. The win left San Diego only a half game behind Dallas and one game behind Denver in the AFL West.

==== Week 6: at Buffalo Bills ====
Week Six: San Diego Chargers at Buffalo Bills – Game summary

Quarter	1	2	3	4	Total
Chargers	0	3	0	7	**10**
Bills	7	14	7	7	**35**

at War Memorial Stadium, Buffalo, New York

- Date: October 13
- Game weather: 49 °F (9.4 °C), relative humidity 64%, wind 7 mph
- Game attendance: 20,074
- Box score

Game information

**First quarter**

- BUF – Elbert Dubenion 19-yard pass from Warren Rabb (Mack Yoho kick), 2:22. Bills 7–0. **Drive: 7 plays, 70 yards.**

**Second quarter**

- BUF – Glenn Bass 76-yard pass from Warren Rabb (Mack Yoho kick), 12:42. Bills 14–0. **Drive: 2 plays, 90 yards.**
- SDG – George Blair 27-yard field goal, 7:35. Bills 14–3. **Drive: 10 plays, 58 yards.**
- BUF – Cookie Gilchrist 1-yard run (Mack Yoho kick), 0:33. Bills 21–3. **Drive: 12 plays, 72 yards.**

**Third quarter**

- BUF – Cookie Gilchrist 7-yard pass from Warren Rabb (Mack Yoho kick), 6:06. Bills 28–3. **Drive: 2 plays, 10 yards.**

**Fourth quarter**

- BUF – Wayne Crow 2-yard run (Mack Yoho kick), 11:46. Bills 35–3. **Drive: 4 plays, 14 yards.**
- SDG – Hezekiah Braxton 5-yard run (George Blair kick), 3:26. Bills 35–10. **Drive: 3 plays, 13 yards.**

**Top passers**

- SDG – Dick Wood – 8/20, 70 yards, 2 INT
- BUF – Warren Rabb – 5/12, 144 yards, 3 TD, INT

**Top rushers**

- SDG – Keith Lincoln – 10 rushes, 32 yards
- BUF – Cookie Gilchrist – 25 rushes, 124 yards, TD

**Top receivers**

- SDG – Dave Kocourek – 2 receptions, 31 yards
- BUF – Glenn Bass – 1 reception, 76 yards, TD

Buffalo dominated the Chargers in numerous statistics. The Bills pulled off a fake field goal in the 1st quarter, and Warren Rabb threw a touchdown three plays later. Hadl's next two passes were both intercepted, with Rabb throwing a 76-yard touchdown after the second of these. With San Diego offering little threat, it was 35–3 to the Bills before Mitinger recovered a fumble and Hezekiah Braxton rushed for his only professional touchdown.

Hadl finished 2 of 12 for 17 yards and two interceptions, for a quarterback rating of zero; Wood replaced him and went 8 of 20 for 70 yards and two further interceptions. Buffalo outgained San Diego 439–115 and had combined rushing stats of 48 carries, 303 yards and two touchdowns. Two Bills (Cookie Gilchrist and Wayne Crow) rushed for over 100 yards. Rabb only completed five passes, but three of those were for touchdowns.

==== Week 7: at Boston Patriots ====
Week Seven: San Diego Chargers at Boston Patriots – Game summary

Quarter	1	2	3	4	Total
Chargers	10	10	0	0	**20**
Patriots	3	0	14	7	**24**

at Nickerson Field, Boston, Massachusetts

- Date: October 19
- Game weather: 53 °F (11.7 °C), relative humidity 65%, wind 11 mph
- Game attendance: 20,888
- Box score

Game information

**First quarter**

- BOS – Gino Cappelletti 13-yard field goal, 10:33. Patriots 7–0. **Drive: 8 plays, 57 yards.**
- SDG – Dave Kocourek 35-yard pass from Dick Wood (George Blair kick) 27-yard field goal, 6:20. Chargers 7–3. **Drive: 8 plays, 76 yards.**
- SDG – George Blair 43-yard field goal. Chargers 10–3. **Drive: 5 plays, 12 yards.**

**Second quarter**

- SDG – Bobby Jackson 2-yard run (George Blair kick), 10:20. Chargers 17–3. **Drive: 3 plays, 52 yards.**
- SDG – George Blair 27-yard field goal, 3:20. Chargers 20–3. **Drive: 4 plays, 2 yards.**

**Third quarter**

- BOS – Jim Colclough 9-yard pass from Babe Parilli (kick failed), 7:15. Chargers 20–9. **Drive: 9 plays, 56 yards.**
- BOS – Jim Colclough 25-yard pass from Babe Parilli (Jim Crawford pass from Babe Parilli), 3:20. Chargers 20–17. **Drive: 6 plays, 70 yards.**

**Fourth quarter**

- BOS – Jim Crawford 1-yard run (Gino Cappelletti kick), 13:45. Patriots 24–20. **Drive: 10 plays, 67 yards.**

**Top passers**

- SDG – Dick Wood – 8/23, 162 yards, TD, 3 INT
- BOS – Babe Parilli – 14/26, 166 yards, 2 TD, 2 INT

**Top rushers**

- SDG – Keith Lincoln – 12 rushes, 48 yards
- BOS – Jim Crawford – 11 rushes, 61 yards, TD

**Top receivers**

- SDG – Don Norton – 4 receptions, 107 yards
- BOS – Ron Burton – 5 receptions, 54 yards

After taking a 17-point lead into the interval, San Diego slipped to another defeat. Boston opened the scoring with a field goal, but Wood led the Chargers 76 yards in 8 plays in response, connecting with Kocourek for a 36-yard touchdown pass on 3rd and 17. Blair added a 43-yard field goal, and the Chargers were soon threatening again after Gibson intercepted Babe Parilli. Wood threw an interception of his own to squander that chance but soon made amends with a 49-yard completion to Norton, setting up Jackson's 2-yard touchdown run. San Diego converted a Dick Harris interception into three further points, and led 20–3 at halftime.

The game turned drastically after halftime. San Diego went three-and-out on their first two possessions, and Parilli responded with touchdown passes each time. A 57-yard kickoff return by Robinson gave San Diego an excellent chance to respond; Hadl came into the game and was immediately intercepted, before the Patriots made it three touchdown drives in a row. Behind for the first time, the Chargers had most of the 4th quarter to respond, but crossed midfield only once in four possessions. On that occasion, Hadl was sacked on consecutive plays, forcing a punt. Wood threw the fourth Charger interception of the day on their final possession.

Norton had his only 100-yard game of the season, with 4 catches for 107 yards.

==== Week 8: at New York Titans ====
Week Eight: San Diego Chargers at New York Titans – Game summary

Quarter	1	2	3	4	Total
Chargers	0	3	0	0	**3**
Titans	0	3	20	0	**23**

at Polo Grounds, New York, New York

- Date: October 28
- Game weather: 51 °F (10.6 °C), relative humidity 47%, wind 17 mph
- Game attendance: 21,467
- Box score

Game information

**First quarter**

- No scoring plays.

**Second quarter**

- NYT – Bill Shockley 18-yard field goal, 9:52. Titans 3–0. **Drive: 11 plays, 40 yards.**
- SDG – George Blair 41-yard field goal, 1:56. Tied 3–3. **Drive: 7 plays, 6 yards.**

**Third quarter**

- NYT – Don Maynard 63-yard pass from Johnny Green (kick blocked), 6:25. Titans 9–3. **Drive: 5 plays, 79 yards.**
- NYT – Dick Christy 73-yard punt return (Bill Shockley kick), 6:25. Titans 16–3.
- NYT – Don Maynard 18-yard pass from Johnny Green (Bill Shockley kick), 6:25. Titans 23–3. **Drive: 7 plays, 69 yards.**

**Fourth quarter**

- No scoring plays.

**Top passers**

- SDG – John Hadl – 9/27, 106 yards, 2 INT
- NYT – Johnny Green – 17/30, 313 yards, 2 TD, INT

**Top rushers**

- SDG – Jacque MacKinnon – 12 rushes, 36 yards
- NYT – Dick Christy – 9 rushes, 71 yards

**Top receivers**

- SDG – Don Norton – 6 receptions, 74 yards
- NYT – Don Maynard – 6 receptions, 157 yards, 2 TD

An error-prone offense could muster no touchdowns as the Chargers lost their third straight. There were numerous wasted chances in the first half: both kickers missed one field goal and made another; Norton had a 33-yard touchdown ruled out by holding; both sides threw interceptions after penetrating the opposition red zone, Harris claiming San Diego's interception. It was 3–3 at the break, but the Titans scored three touchdowns in a span of 7:49 to effectively win the game in the 3rd quarter, Don Maynard catching scoring passes of 63 and 18 yards either side of a punt return touchdown.

San Diego again tried both their rookie quarterbacks with little success. Hadl started and was 9 of 27 for 106 yards and two interceptions, while also losing a fumble; Wood was 5 of 13 for 62 yards and an interception.

==== Week 9: vs. Denver Broncos ====
Week Nine: Denver Broncos at San Diego Chargers – Game summary

Quarter	1	2	3	4	Total
Broncos	7	0	7	9	**23**
Chargers	0	17	3	0	**20**

at Balboa Stadium, San Diego, California

- Date: November 4
- Game weather: 62 °F (16.7 °C), relative humidity 77%, wind 8 mph
- Game attendance: 20,827
- Box score

Game information

**First quarter**

- DEN – Donnie Stone 1-yard run (Gene Mingo kick), 1:55. Broncos 7–0. **Drive: 13 plays, 77 yards.**

**Second quarter**

- SDG – George Blair 27-yard field goal, 12:51. Broncos 7–3. **Drive: 11 plays, 57 yards.**
- SDG – Jerry Robinson 72-yard pass from John Hadl (George Blair kick), 1:13. Chargers 10–7. **Drive: 2 plays, 82 yards.**
- SDG – Jacque MacKinnon 9-yard pass from John Hadl (George Blair kick), 0:46. Chargers 17–7. **Drive: 3 plays, 24 yards.**

**Third quarter**

- SDG – George Blair 14-yard field goal, 10:43. Chargers 20–7. **Drive: 7 plays, 67 yards.**
- DEN – Donnie Stone 6-yard run (Gene Mingo kick), 8:10. Chargers 20–14. **Drive: 1 play, 5 yards.**

**Fourth quarter**

- DEN – Donnie Stone 13-yard pass from Frank Tripucka (Gene Mingo kick), 12:43. Broncos 21–20. **Drive: 9 plays, 76 yards.**
- DEN – Safety, ball snapped out of end zone, 5:17. Broncos 23–20.

**Top passers**

- DEN – Frank Tripucka – 17/32, 202 yards, TD, INT
- SDG – John Hadl – 10/26, 198 yards, 2 TD, 2 INT

**Top rushers**

- DEN – Gee Mingo – 6 rushes, 18 yards
- SDG – John Hadl – 10 rushes, 60 yards

**Top receivers**

- DEN – Gene Prebola – 5 receptions, 73 yards
- SDG – Jerry Robinson – 3 receptions, 125 yards, TD

With division-leading Denver three games ahead of them, this was San Diego's last serious chance to get back into the title game race. Their performance was greatly improved from the previous week, but another bad second half cost them the win. After the Broncos went 77 yards in 13 plays for the opening touchdown, Hadl got the Chargers moving with an 18-yard carry, and Blair notched a 27-yard field goal. A Gibson interception later set San Diego up at the Bronco 14, but Hadl threw incomplete on 4th and 2 and the Chargers came up empty handed. Shortly before halftime, Bobby Bethune also picked off a pass; two plays later, Hadl found Robinson for a 72-yard touchdown. Denver then fumbled the kickoff, and San Diego took advantage when MacKinnon caught his first professional touchdown.

A 48-yard pass from Hadl to Robinson led to another Blair field goal on the opening possession of the 3rd quarter, and it was 20–7. San Diego then forced a punt, but Hadl fumbled two plays later and the tide began to turn. Denver scored on the next play and, following a Hadl interception, drove 76 yards in 9 plays to take the lead with 12:43 to play. The Chargers had to punt on their next two possessions; on the second of these, the ball went over Paul Maguire's head for a safety. San Diego had one more possession, starting at their own 13. Two Hadl runs and a pass interference penalty moved the ball to the Bronco 47, but former Charger Bob Zeman then stepped in with an interception, and Denver ran out the clock.

Hadl played a complete game for the first time. He finished 10 of 26 for 198 yards, two touchdowns and two interceptions while also rushing 10 times for 60 yards. Robinson caught 3 passes for 125 yards and a touchdown.

==== Week 10: vs. Buffalo Bills ====
Week Ten: Buffalo Bills at San Diego Chargers – Game summary

Quarter	1	2	3	4	Total
Bills	17	20	3	0	**40**
Chargers	0	0	6	14	**20**

at Balboa Stadium, San Diego, California

- Date: November 11
- Game weather: 58 °F (14.4 °C), relative humidity 81%, wind 6 mph
- Game attendance: 22,204
- Box score

Game information

**First quarter**

- BUF – Cookie Gilchrist 2-yard run (Cookie Gilchrist kick), 9:04. Bills 7–0. **Drive: 7 plays, 63 yards.**
- BUF – Cookie Gilchrist 19-yard field goal, 2:21. Bills 10–0. **Drive: 6 plays, 21 yards.**
- BUF – Wray Carlton 12-yard run (Cookie Gilchrist kick), 0:16. Bills 17–0. **Drive: 2 plays, 11 yards.**

**Second quarter**

- BUF – Wray Carlton 14-yard run (Cookie Gilchrist kick), 11:57. Bills 24–0. **Drive: 2 plays, 39 yards.**
- BUF – Elbert Dubenion 68-yard pass from Warren Rabb (Cookie Gilchrist kick), 7:54. Bills 31–0. **Drive: 2 plays, 70 yards.**
- BUF – Glenn Bass 13-yard pass from Warren Rabb (kick failed), 5:16. Bills 37–0. **Drive: 4 plays, 21 yards.**

**Third quarter**

- SDG – Dave Kocourek 15-yard pass from John Hadl (run failed), 8:25. Bills 37–6. **Drive: 10 plays, 90 yards.**
- BUF – Cookie Gilchrist 12-yard field goal, 3:32. Bills 40–6. **Drive: 13 plays, 66 yards.**

**Fourth quarter**

- SDG – Bobby Jackson 1-yard run (run failed), 12:07. Bills 40–12. **Drive: 12 plays, 76 yards.**
- SDG – Bobby Jackson 3-yard run (Hezekiah Braxton run), 1:54. Bills 40–20. **Drive: 7 plays, 26 yards.**

**Top passers**

- BUF – Warren Rabb – 6/16, 124 yards, 2 TD, 2 INT
- SDG – John Hadl – 15/28, 217 yards, TD, 3 INT

**Top rushers**

- BUF – Wray Carlton – 12 rushes, 92 yards, 2 TD
- SDG – Jacque MacKinnon – 17 rushes, 102 yards

**Top receivers**

- BUF – Elbert Dubenion – 3 receptions, 89 yards, TD
- SDG – Dave Kocourek – 7 receptions, 126 yards, TD

Buffalo again dominated the Chargers early on, though San Diego made the final score respectable. With Hadl throwing two interceptions and losing a fumble in the first half, Buffalo scored on their first six possessions and led 37–0 at halftime. While San Diego never seriously threatened a comeback, they did pick up three touchdowns from their four-second half possessions. Hadl's 15-yard pass to Kocourek capped a 90-yard drive, and Jackson scored twice from close in, while Braxton added a two-point conversion.

In contrast to the statistical dominance of the first game, San Diego actually gained slightly more yardage on offense (370–335), though they lost the turnover count 5–2. MacKinnon rushed 17 times for 102 yards, while Kocourek caught 7 passes for 126 yards and a touchdown.

==== Week 12: at Houston Oilers ====
Week Twelve: San Diego Chargers at Houston Oilers – Game summary

Quarter	1	2	3	4	Total
Chargers	14	7	3	3	**27**
Oilers	0	12	7	14	**33**

at Jeppesen Stadium, Houston, Texas

- Date: November 25
- Game weather: 64 °F (17.8 °C), relative humidity 80%, wind 3 mph
- Game attendance: 28,235
- Box score

Game information

**First quarter**

- SDG – Jacque MacKinnon 32-yard pass from John Hadl (George Blair kick), 12:35. Chargers 7–0. **Drive: 3 plays, 37 yards.**
- SDG – Dave Kocourek 26-yard pass from John Hadl (George Blair kick), 11:10. Chargers 14–0. **Drive: 1 play, 26 yards.**

**Second quarter**

- HOU – Willard Dewveall 98-yard pass from Jacky Lee (George Blanda kick), 9:58. Chargers 14–7. **Drive: 1 play, 98 yards.**
- HOU – Safety, Jerry Robinson ran out of end zone, 9:50. Chargers 14–9.
- HOU – George Blanda 42-yard field goal, 7:33. Chargers 14–12. **Drive: 4 plays, 8 yards.**
- SDG – Reggie Carolan 12-yard pass from John Hadl (George Blair kick), 3:54. Chargers 21–12. **Drive: 4 plays, 32 yards.**

**Third quarter**

- HOU – Billy Cannon 1-yard run (George Blanda kick), 9:05. Chargers 21–19. **Drive: 7 plays, 49 yards.**
- SDG – George Blair 17-yard field goal, 0:41. Chargers 24–19. **Drive: 5 plays, 30 yards.**

**Fourth quarter**

- SDG – George Blair 11-yard field goal, 14:13. Chargers 27–19. **Drive: 4 plays, 9 yards.**
- HOU – Willard Dewveall 4-yard pass from George Blanda (Billy Cannon pass from George Blanda), 12:24. Tied 27–27. **Drive: 7 plays, 77 yards.**
- HOU – George Blanda 23-yard field goal, 6:52. Oilers 30–27. **Drive: 4 plays, 6 yards.**
- HOU – George Blanda 29-yard field goal, 3:13. Oilers 33–27. **Drive: 4 plays, -1 yards.**

**Top passers**

- SDG – John Hadl – 15/39, 261 yards, 3 TD, 3 INT
- HOU – Jacky Lee – 7/13, 164 yards, TD, 3 INT

**Top rushers**

- SDG – Bobby Jackson – 17 rushes, 86 yards
- HOU – Charley Tolar – 12 rushes, 40 yards

**Top receivers**

- SDG – Don Norton – 3 receptions, 59 yards
- HOU – Willard Dewveall – 3 receptions, 139 yards, 2 TD

San Diego gave the Eastern division-leading Oilers a scare before losing their sixth straight game. Despite kicking off, the Chargers led 14–0 after only nine plays from scrimmage: Gibson intercepted George Blanda to set up Hadl's 32-yard scoring pass to MacKinnon; Karas recovered a fumble, and Kocourek's 26-yard touchdown catch followed on the next play. Houston's recovery began the play after a Maguire punt had pinned them two yards from their own end zone, as backup QB Jacky Lee found Willard Dewveall for a 98-yard touchdown. Robinson took the ensuing kickoff out of bounds from his own end zone for a safety, and Blanda's 42-yard field goal made it 12 points scored in 2:25. Hadl was then stopped on a 4th down sneak, but Faison's fumble recovery gave San Diego another chance, and Hadl found Carolan from 12 yards, making it 21–12 at halftime.

Houston pulled seven points back on their first possession of the second half, but Lee threw interceptions to Bethune and Bud Whitehead on consecutive pass attempts, both of which were converted into Blair field goals. Blanda then returned as quarterback, completing four passes on a quick 77-yard touchdown drive, finishing by connecting with Dewveall from 16 yards – a successful two point conversion tied the scores. Gibson intercepted Blanda's next pass, but Hadl was then picked off on consecutive possessions, leading to a pair of Blanda field goals, the latter with 3:13 left. Four straight incompletions from Hadl turned the ball back to Houston, but Blanda missed from 26 yards out with a chance to clinch the win. Starting on his own 20 with 1:13 to play, Hadl was sacked on first down but responded with four straight completions, three of them to Robinson, giving the Chargers a 2nd and 1 at the Oiler 25. An incompletion, a penalty, and a sack pushed San Diego back before Robinson was tackled well short on a 4th-down attempt and Houston ran out the clock.

Hadl was 15 of 39 for 261 yards, three touchdowns and three interceptions. The Chargers lost despite their defense forcing seven turnovers.

==== Week 13: vs. Oakland Raiders ====
Week Thirteen: Oakland Raiders at San Diego Chargers – Game summary

Quarter	1	2	3	4	Total
Raiders	0	0	7	14	**21**
Chargers	14	0	7	10	**31**

at Balboa Stadium, San Diego, California

- Date: December 2
- Game weather: 56 °F (13.3 °C), relative humidity 79%, wind 8 mph
- Game attendance: 17,874
- Box score

Game information

**First quarter**

- SDG – Gerry McDougall 7-yard run (George Blair kick), 6:37. Chargers 7–0. **Drive: 3 plays, 23 yards.**
- SDG – Gerry McDougall 24-yard run (George Blair kick), 2:06. Chargers 14–0. **Drive: 6 plays, 68 yards.**

**Second quarter**

- No scoring plays.

**Third quarter**

- SDG – Don Norton 23-yard pass from John Hadl (George Blair kick), 8:36. Chargers 21–10. **Drive: 10 plays, 80 yards.**
- OAK – Clem Daniels 2-yard run (Ben Agajanian kick), 5:31. Chargers 21–7. **Drive: 6 plays, 67 yards.**

**Fourth quarter**

- SDG – Keith Lincoln 17-yard pass from John Hadl (George Blair kick), 14:20. Chargers 28–7. **Drive: 10 plays, 68 yards.**
- OAK – Dick Dorsey 65-yard pass from Cotton Davidson (Ben Agajanian kick), 13:37. Chargers 28–14. **Drive: 1 play, 65 yards.**
- OAK – Dick Dorsey 90-yard pass from Cotton Davidson (Ben Agajanian kick), 6:36. Chargers 28–21. **Drive: 2 plays, 85 yards.**
- SDG – George Blair 12-yard field goal, 0:20. Chargers 31–21. **Drive: 6 plays, 27 yards.**

**Top passers**

- OAK – Cotton Davidson – 10/25, 273 yards, 2 TD, 2 INT
- SDG – John Hadl – 11/24, 161 yards, 2 TD, INT

**Top rushers**

- OAK – Clem Daniels – 16 rushes, 85 yards, TD
- SDG – Gerry McDougall – 22 rushes, 108 yards, 2 TD

**Top receivers**

- OAK – Dick Dorsey – 2 receptions, 155 yards, 2 TD
- SDG – Don Norton – 5 receptions, 71 yards, TD

The Chargers broke their losing streak against a winless Raider team, though they had to survive another late lapse to do so. Gibson returned a punt to the Raider 23 midway through the 1st quarter, and McDougall ran in his first career touchdown from the 7 a few plays later. Following a Raider three-and-out, San Diego progressed to the Oakland 24, from where MacDougall scored again. The Raiders threatened several times throughout the first half, but were foiled by a turnover on downs, a missed field goal by former Charger Ben Agajanian, and Bethune's interception of a Cotton Davidson pass.

Following another Agajanian miss, San Diego drove 80 yards and scored on Norton's 23-yard reception. Oakland responded with a quick touchdown, before the Chargers came straight back with a 68-yard drive, capped by Hadl's 17-yard pass to Lincoln. That made it 28–7 with 14:20 to play, but the Raiders scored on two of their next three plays, Davidson connecting with Dick Dorsey for 65- and 90-yard touchdowns. On their next possession, Oakland reached 4th and 2 at the Charger 37, whereupon Faison intercepted Davidson at the line and returned the ball 30 yards to the Oakland 32. San Diego ran the clock down and clinched the win with Blair's 12-yard field goal, 20 seconds from time.

San Diego moved to 6–0 against their cross-state rivals. MacDougall had a career day, with 22 carries for 108 yards and two touchdowns.

==== Week 14: vs. Boston Patriots ====
Week Fourteen: Boston Patriots at San Diego Chargers – Game summary

Quarter	1	2	3	4	Total
Patriots	7	10	0	3	**20**
Chargers	0	3	3	8	**14**

at Balboa Stadium, San Diego, California

- Date: December 9
- Game weather: 57 °F (13.9 °C), relative humidity 79%, wind 8 mph
- Game attendance: 19,887
- Box score

Game information

**First quarter**

- BOS – Jim Crawford 43-yard pass from Tom Yewcic (Gino Cappelletti kick), 4:41. Patriots 7–0. **Drive: 3 plays, 47 yards.**

**Second quarter**

- SDG – George Blair 42-yard field goal, 12:50. Patriots 7–3. **Drive: 9 plays, 45 yards.**
- BOS – Gino Cappelletti 18-yard field goal, 7:22. Patriots 10–3. **Drive: 11 plays, 60 yards.**
- BOS – Jim Colclough 12-yard pass from Tom Yewcic (Gino Cappelletti kick), 1:27. Patriots 17–3. **Drive: 9 plays, 69 yards.**

**Third quarter**

- SDG – George Blair 42-yard field goal, 8:17. Patriots 17–6. **Drive: 4 plays, -3 yards.**

**Fourth quarter**

- BOS – Gino Cappelletti 9-yard field goal, 9:10. Patriots 20–6. **Drive: 7 plays, 41 yards.**
- SDG – Gerry McDougall 2-yard run (Dave Kocourek pass from Val Keckin), 4:09. Patriots 20–12. **Drive: 3 plays, 11 yards.**

**Top passers**

- BOS – Tom Yewcic – 7/22, 147 yards, 2 TD, INT
- SDG – John Hadl – 7/18, 86 yards

**Top rushers**

- BOS – Ron Burton – 19 rushes, 83 yards
- SDG – Gerry McDougall – 13 rushes, 38 yards, TD

**Top receivers**

- BOS – Jim Crawford – 2 receptions, 61 yards, TD
- SDG – Don Norton – 5 receptions, 79 yards

A weak offensive performance hampered the Chargers in a narrow defeat. Stymied by three turnovers, San Diego snapped the ball in Patriots territory on only three of their first eleven possessions, which encompassed three and a half quarters. Blair made a pair of 42-yard field goals, but they trailed 20–6. The defense then recovered a fumble at the Boston 11. McDougall scored three plays later, and new backup quarterback Keckin passed to Kocourek for a two-point conversion. However, an onside kick failed, and San Diego went three-and-out on their final possession.

Neither team moved the ball easily; the Chargers were outgained 287–187. Buncom set up one of Blair's field goals with an interception. By going for two when down by eight, the Chargers became one of the first teams to try a situational tactic that would become popular decades later.

==== Week 15: at Dallas Texans ====
Week Fifteen: San Diego Chargers at Dallas Texans – Game summary

Quarter	1	2	3	4	Total
Chargers	7	0	10	0	**17**
Texans	3	20	0	3	**26**

at Cotton Bowl, Dallas, Texas

- Date: December 16
- Game weather: 52 °F (11.1 °C), relative humidity 74%, wind 9 mph
- Game attendance: 18,384
- Box score

Game information

**First quarter**

- DAL – Tommy Brooker 30-yard field goal, 10:50. Texans 3–0. **Drive: 8 plays, 36 yards, 4:10.**
- SDG – Jerry Robinson 20-yard pass from Keith Lincoln (George Blair kick), 4:02. Chargers 7–3. **Drive: 8 plays, 78 yards, 4:08.**

**Second quarter**

- DAL – Tommy Brooker 28-yard field goal, 12:18. Chargers 7–6. **Drive: 12 plays, 53 yards, 6:44.**
- DAL – Len Dawson 5-yard run (Tommy Brooker kick), 10:45. Texans 13–7. **Drive: 2 plays, 7 yards, 0:50.**
- DAL – Jack Spikes 13-yard pass from Len Dawson (Tommy Brooker kick), 2:30. Texans 20–7. **Drive: 8 plays, 61 yards, 3:44.**
- DAL – Tommy Brooker 34-yard field goal, 0:12. Texans 23–7. **Drive: 1 play, 0 yards, 0:04.**

**Third quarter**

- SDG – Don Norton 13-yard pass from John Hadl (George Blair kick), 12:48. Texans 23–14. **Drive: 5 plays, 75 yards, 2:12.**
- SDG – George Blair 35-yard field goal, 7:43. Texans 23–17. **Drive: 7 plays, 28 yards, 2:19.**

**Fourth quarter**

- DAL – Tommy Brooker 13-yard field goal, 14:57. Texans 26–17. **Drive: 7 plays, 16 yards, 2:49.**

**Top passers**

- SDG – John Hadl – 11/29, 152 yards, TD, 5 INT
- DAL – Len Dawson – 13/21, 126 yards, TD, 2 INT

**Top rushers**

- SDG – Keith Lincoln – 11 rushes, 74 yards
- DAL – Abner Haynes – 20 rushes, 82 yards

**Top receivers**

- SDG – Don Norton – 6 receptions, 86 yards, TD
- DAL – Curtis McClinton – 6 receptions, 68 yards

Charger quarterbacks threw six interceptions as they lost to finish 4–10. After conceding an early field goal, San Diego drove 78 yards in 8 plays, taking the lead on a trick play as Lincoln threw a 20-yard touchdown to a diving Robinson. The Texans, bound for the AFL title game, scored 20 unanswered points in the 2nd quarter, while Hadl was intercepted twice and Keckin lost a fumbled and was intercepted.

Lincoln broke off a 47-yard run down the right sideline on the first play of the second half, and Hadl followed up with a 13-yard touchdown pass to Norton. Following a field goal on their next drive, San Diego trailed just 23–17. Buncom intercepted Len Dawson to snuff out a Texans threat, but Hadl was soon intercepted in return, and Dallas added an insurance field goal on the first play of the final quarter. Hadl was picked off twice more in opposition territory as the quarter wore on.

Dallas defensive back Bobby Ply had four interceptions, still tied for the most in AFL/NFL history. On top of his touchdown pass, Lincoln finished with 11 carries for 74 yards.

== Standings ==
AFL Western Division
	W	L	T	PCT	DIV	PF	PA	STK
Dallas Texans	11	3	0	.786	5–1	389	233	W2
Denver Broncos	7	7	0	.500	4–2	353	334	L5
San Diego Chargers	4	10	0	.286	3–3	314	392	L2
Oakland Raiders	1	13	0	.071	0–6	213	370	W1

Note: Tie games were not officially counted in the standings in the AFL.

== Awards ==
=== Internal ===
Late in the season, the Chargers held their annual awards banquet. The Most Inspirational Player award was conferred by teammates, while others were decided by a fan vote.

Award	Winner
Team MVP	Keith Lincoln
Most Inspirational Player	Emil Karas
Rookie of the Year	Bob Mitinger
Most Valuable Offensive Back	John Hadl
Most Valuable Offensive End	Dave Kocourek
Most Valuable Offensive Lineman	Ron Mix
Most Valuable Defensive Back	Emil Karas
Most Valuable Defensive Lineman	Earl Faison

=== External ===
Nine Chargers were in the West division squad for the AFL All-Star game; Ron Mix was named to the Associated Press All-AFL 1st team and three others to the 2nd team.

Player	Position	All-Star	AP 1st-team All-Pro	AP 2nd-team All-Pro
Chuck Allen	Linebacker			Yes
Reggie Carolan	Tight end	Yes		
Earl Faison	Defensive end	Yes		
Dick Harris	Cornerback			Yes
Emil Karas	Linebacker	Yes		
Dave Kocourek	Tight end	Yes		Yes
Ernie Ladd	Defensive tackle	Yes		
Keith Lincoln	Running back	Yes		
Paul Maguire	Linebacker	Yes		
Ron Mix	Tackle	Yes	Yes	
Don Norton	End	Yes		
