= 1962 Dallas Texans season =

NFL team season

- Owner: Lamar Hunt
- General manager: Jack Steadman
- Head coach: Hank Stram
- Home stadium: Cotton Bowl

Results
- Record: 11–3
- Division place: 1st AFL Western
- Playoffs: Won AFL Championship (at Oilers) 20–17 (2OT)
- AFL All-Stars: QB Len Dawson; HB Abner Haynes; FB Curtis McClinton; G Marvin Terrell; OT Jerry Cornelison; OT Jim Tyrer; TE Fred Arbanas; DB Dave Grayson; LB E.J. Holub; DT Jerry Mays; DT Mel Branch; LB Sherrill Headrick

The 1962 Dallas Texans season was the third and final season of Lamar Hunt's American Football League (AFL) franchise before its relocation to Kansas City from Dallas.

The Texans won their first AFL championship (and only title in Dallas) when they defeated their intrastate rivals, the two-time defending champion Houston Oilers, 20–17 in double overtime—a game which now stands as the second longest game in pro football history and the longest in AFL history.

Coach Hank Stram was named the AFL Coach of the Year and RB Curtis McClinton was named AFL Rookie of the Year. Haynes became the franchise's first 1,000-yard rusher, concluding the season with 1,049 yards and an AFL-high 13 rushing TDs.

The Texans set an AFL record for completion percentage in a season (60.6%). They led the league in both points scored (389), fewest points allowed (233), and total touchdowns (50; 29 passing, 21 rushing) in 1962.

== 1962 AFL draft ==
Round	Player	Position	College
1	Ronnie Bull	Halfback	Baylor
2	Bill Miller	End	Miami (Florida)
3	Eddie Wilson	Quarterback	Arizona
4	Charles Hinton	Tackle	North Carolina College
4	Irv Goode	Center	Kentucky (from Buffalo)
5	Bobby Plummer	Tackle	TCU
5	Bobby Ply	Quarterback	Baylor (from New York)
5	Bill Hull	End	Wake Forest (from Boston)
6	Al Hinton	End	Iowa
8	Larry Bowie	Tackle	Purdue
9	Dick Mills	Tackle	Pittsburgh
10	Jimmy Saxton	Halfback	Texas
11	Bobby Hunt	Defensive back	Auburn (from Oakland)
11	Guy Reese	Tackle	SMU
12	Bobby Thompson	Halfback	Arizona
14	Bookie Bolin	Guard	Mississippi
15	Dave Graham	Tackle	Virginia
16	Pettis Norman	End	John Smith
17	Tommy Brooker	End	Alabama
18	Joe Carollo	Tackle	Notre Dame
19	Lee Welch	Halfback	Mississippi State
20	Mike Semcheski	Guard	Lehigh
21	Kent Martin	Tackle	Wake Forest
22	Jim Bernhardt	Tackle	Linfield
23	Russ Foret	Tackle	Georgia Tech
24	Pat Trammell	Quarterback	Alabama
25	John Burrell	End	Rice
26	Walt Rappold	Quarterback	Duke
27	Scott Tyler	Halfback	Miami (Ohio)
28	Jim Thrush	Tackle	Xavier
29	Ed Ryan	Halfback	Michigan State
30	Don Goodman	Halfback	Florida
31	Everisto Nino	Tackle	East Texas State
32	Joel Arrington	Halfback	Duke
33	Jack Wilson	Halfback	Duke
34	Roger Shoals	Center	Maryland

=== Roster ===
1962 Dallas Texans roster
Quarterbacks: 16 Len Dawson; 12 Eddie Wilson P; Running Backs: 28 Abner Haynes; 26 Frank Jackson; 32 Curtis McClinton; 30 Jack Spikes; Wide Receivers / Flankers: 81 Tommy Brooker; 88 Chris Burford; 82 Bill Miller; 10 Jimmy Saxton; Tight Ends: 84 Fred Arbanas	Offensive Linemen: 66 Sonny Bishop G; 74 Jerry Cornelison T; 79 Charley Diamond T/G; 65 Jon Gilliam C; 67 Carl Larpenter G; 60 Al Reynolds G; 63 Marvin Terrell G; 77 Jim Tyrer T; Defensive Linemen: 87 Mel Branch RDE; 86 Dick Davis DE/DT; 85 Bill Hull LDE; 75 Jerry Mays DE; 64 Curt Merz DE/DT/G; 72 Paul Rochester DT	Linebackers: 56 Walt Corey OLB; 54 Ted Greene MLB; 69 Sherrill Headrick MLB; 55 E. J. Holub OLB; 35 Smokey Stover OLB; Defensive Backs: 20 Bobby Hunt SS; 45 Dave Grayson CB; 14 Bobby Ply CB/S; 42 Johnny Robinson FS; 48 Duane Wood CB; Special Teams: 14 Tom Pennington K; Rookies in italics

== Schedule ==
=== Season summary ===
The Texans clinched their initial AFL Western Division Championship in November and finished with an 11–3 regular season record. Dallas won the 1962 AFL Championship when K Tommy Brooker connected on a 25-yard field goal during the second overtime of the title game, giving the Texans a 20–17 victory at Houston (12/23). Spanning an elapsed time of 77:54, the game still stands as the second-longest contest in pro football history as the franchise claimed its first of three AFL titles. The game is the longest in the history of the American Football League.

=== Preseason ===
Week	Date	Opponent	Result	Record	Venue	Attendance	Recap
1	August 4	vs. Oakland Raiders	**W** 13–3	1–0	American Field* (Atlanta)	8,000	Recap
2	August 11	at San Diego Chargers	**L** 0–17	1–1	Balboa Stadium	28,555	Recap
3	August 18	Oakland Raiders	**W** 22–6	2–1	Memorial Stadium* (Midland)	10,000	Recap
4	August 24	Denver Broncos	**L** 24–27 (OT)	2–2	Farrington Field* (Fort Worth)	18,000	Recap
5	August 31	vs. Houston Oilers	**L** 31–34	2–3	Miami Orange Bowl* (Miami)	27,530	Recap

* Special pre-season game site

=== Regular season ===
Week	Date	Opponent	Result	Record	Venue	Attendance	Recap	Sources
1	September 8	Boston Patriots	**W** 42–28	1–0	Cotton Bowl	32,000	Recap	
2	Bye							
3	September 23	at **Oakland Raiders**	**W** 26–16	2–0	Frank Youell Field	12,500	Recap	
4	September 30	Buffalo Bills	**W** 41–21	3–0	Cotton Bowl	25,500	Recap	
5	October 7	at **San Diego Chargers**	**L** 28–32	3–1	Balboa Stadium	23,092	Recap	
6	October 12	at Boston Patriots	**W** 27–7	4–1	Boston University Field	23,874	Recap	
7	October 21	New York Titans	**W** 20–17	5–1	Cotton Bowl	17,814	Recap	
8	October 28	at Houston Oilers	**W** 31–7	6–1	Jeppesen Stadium	31,750	Recap	
9	November 4	Houston Oilers	**L** 6–14	6–2	Cotton Bowl	29,017	Recap	
10	November 11	at New York Titans	**W** 52–31	7–2	Polo Grounds	13,275	Recap	
11	November 18	at **Denver Broncos**	**W** 24–3	8–2	Bears Stadium	23,523	Recap	
12	November 25	**Oakland Raiders**	**W** 35–7	9–2	Cotton Bowl	13,557	Recap	
13	December 2	at Buffalo Bills	**L** 14–23	9–3	War Memorial Stadium	35,261	Recap	
14	December 9	**Denver Broncos**	**W** 17–10	10–3	Cotton Bowl	19,137	Recap	
15	December 16	**San Diego Chargers**	**W** 26–17	11–3	Cotton Bowl	18,384	Recap	
Note: Intra-division opponents are in **bold** text.

=== Postseason ===
Round	Date	Opponent	Result	Record	Venue	Attendance	Recap
AFL Championship	December 23	at Houston Oilers	**W** 20–17 (2OT)	12–3	Jeppesen Stadium	37,981	Recap

== Standings ==
AFL Western Division
	W	L	T	PCT	DIV	PF	PA	STK
Dallas Texans	11	3	0	.786	5–1	389	233	W2
Denver Broncos	7	7	0	.500	4–2	353	334	L5
San Diego Chargers	4	10	0	.286	3–3	314	392	L2
Oakland Raiders	1	13	0	.071	0–6	213	370	W1

Note: Tie games were not officially counted in the standings in the AFL.

== 1962 AFL Championship ==
Dallas Texans 20, Houston Oilers 17 (2OT)

Quarter	1	2	3	4	OT	2OT	Total
Texans	3	14	0	0	0	3	20
Oilers	0	0	7	10	0	0	17

at Jeppesen Stadium, Houston, Texas

- Date: December 23, 1962
- Game time: 2:00 p.m. CST
- Game attendance: 37,981
- TV announcers (ABC): Curt Gowdy, Paul Christman, and Jack Buck

Game information
- First quarter
  - DAL – Field goal Brooker 16
- Second quarter
  - DAL – Haynes 28 pass from Dawson (Brooker kick)
  - DAL – Haynes 2 run (Brooker kick)
- Third quarter
  - HOU – Dewveall 15 pass from Blanda (Blanda kick)
- Fourth quarter
  - HOU – Field goal Blanda 31
  - HOU – Tolar 1 run (Blanda kick)
- First overtime
- no scoring
- Second overtime
  - DAL – Field goal Brooker 25

The Dallas Texans final season game was a win and in 1963, the team moved to Kansas City but missed the playoffs for the first time since 1961.

Preceded by Houston Oilers; 1961	American Football League champion 1962	Succeeded by San Diego Chargers; 1963
