= Johnny Robinson (safety) =

American football player (born 1938)

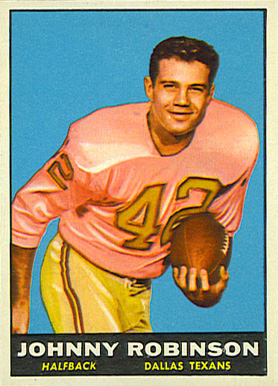
- Robinson on a 1961 Topps trading card

No. 42
- Positions: Safety, flanker, halfback

Personal information
- Born: September 9, 1938 (age 88); Delhi, Louisiana, U.S.
- Listed height: 6 ft 1 in (1.85 m)
- Listed weight: 205 lb (93 kg)

Career information
- High school: University (Baton Rouge, Louisiana)
- College: LSU
- NFL draft: 1960: 1st round, 3rd overall pick
- AFL draft: 1960: 1st round

Career history

Playing
- Dallas Texans / Kansas City Chiefs (1960–1971)

Coaching
- Jacksonville Sharks (1974) Defensive backs coach; Jacksonville Express (1975) Defensive backs coach

Awards and highlights
- Super Bowl champion (IV); Pro Bowl (1970); First-team All-Pro (1970); NFL interceptions leader (1970); AFL champion (1962); 6× AFL All-Star (1963–1968); 5× First-team All-AFL (1965–1969); 2× Second-team All-AFL (1963, 1964); AFL interceptions leader (1966); AFL All-Time Team; Kansas City Chiefs Hall of Fame; National champion (1958); First-team All-SEC (1958); Second-team All-SEC (1959)

Career AFL/NFL statistics
- Rushing yards: 658
- Rushing average: 4.4
- Receptions: 77
- Receiving yards: 1,228
- Interceptions: 57
- Fumble recoveries: 6
- Total touchdowns: 18
- Stats at Pro Football Reference
- Pro Football Hall of Fame

Johnny Nolan Robinson (born September 9, 1938) is an American former professional football player. He was primarily a free safety, playing the final 10 years of his career at that position; but also played on offense as a halfback and flanker early in his career. Robinson played college football for the Louisiana State University (LSU) Tigers in the Southeastern Conference (SEC).

Robinson played his entire 12-year professional career with the Dallas Texans / Kansas City Chiefs of the American Football League (AFL) and later the National Football League (NFL). He played on three AFL championship teams and played in Super Bowls I and IV. Robinson led the AFL in interceptions with 10 in 1966, and led the NFL in 1970 with 10. He had 57 interceptions during his career, and two or more interceptions in a single game over 15 times during his regular season career, and two interceptions in the 1962 AFL Championship Game. Robinson is a 2019 inductee to the Pro Football Hall of Fame, becoming the ninth member of the Chiefs' Super Bowl IV championship team to be inducted, and the sixth member of that team's defense to be inducted.

He played in two Sugar Bowls at LSU (1959 and 1960), and was a member of the 1958 LSU Tigers national championship team. He was first-team All-SEC in 1958 and second-team All-SEC in 1959. Robinson was also an SEC champion tennis player at LSU in singles and doubles.

== Early life ==
Born in Delhi, Louisiana, on September 9, 1938, Robinson was W. T. "Dub" and Mattie Robinson's second son. Robinson was an All-State football, tennis, and baseball player in high school. He became starting fullback in his freshman year at University High School (U-High), Louisiana State University's (LSU) laboratory school located on LSU's campus in Baton Rouge. He played in the 1956 Louisiana high school all-star football game, along with future college teammate Billy Cannon.

Robinson and his older brother, Tommy, won the national Boys' Junior Tennis Championship when they were at U-High, where Dub Robinson was the LSU tennis coach from 1948 to 1974. Tommy was the superior tennis player and was inducted into the Louisiana Tennis Hall of Fame in 2015.

In 2019, University High retired Robinson's football jersey No. 44.

== College career ==
Robinson committed to play college football at LSU, in the Southeastern Conference (SEC), under head coach Paul Dietzel. From 1957 to 1959, he would become one of the greatest two-way players in team history. In his junior season,1958, the Tigers won all ten games in the regular season. Then, on January 1, 1959, they won the Sugar Bowl over Clemson 7–0 (making them 11-0), further winning the national championship. Billy Cannon, the 1958 Heisman Trophy winner, was also on that team. LSU went 9–2 in 1959, and again played in the Sugar Bowl, on January 1, 1960, losing to Ole Miss. Robinson had a fractured hand and did not carry the ball once in that game.

In 1958, Robinson earned first-team All-SEC honors as a halfback, and in 1959, he was second-team All-SEC. Over his three-year LSU career, the team was 25–7, and Robinson had 893 rushing yards, 453 receiving yards, and 14 touchdowns. In a 1958 game against Tulane, Robison had four touchdowns in the second half, and United Press International named him Back Of The Week.

Also while at LSU, he won the 1958 SEC tennis championship in singles, and SEC doubles championship with his brother Tommy.

== Professional playing career ==
In 1960, Robinson was selected by the Dallas Texans (who later became the Kansas City Chiefs) of the American Football League (AFL) in the first round of the 1960 AFL draft; and selected third overall by the Detroit Lions of the National Football League (NFL) in the 1960 NFL draft. Robinson originally signed with Detroit; but later chose to play for the Texans. The Lions brought suit in a Louisiana United States district court to enjoin Robinson from playing for the Texans, but were unsuccessful as the court found the Lions' contract with Robinson was not binding. The Lions pursued the matter, finally losing on appeal in November 1960, while Robinson was already playing his first season with the Texans.

Robinson had an excellent preseason with the Texans in 1960 on offense, especially as a receiver, and started 12 games as a rookie in 1960; the AFL's first season. During his first two years in the AFL, Robinson played flanker/right halfback on offense, rushing for 658 yards on 150 carries and had 1,228 receiving yards on 77 receptions, and fifteen touchdowns. As a rookie in 1960, Robinson had over 1,000 yards of total offense; 458 rushing yards while averaging 4.7 yards per attempt, and 41 receptions for 611 yards. He scored four touchdowns rushing and four receiving. The next season he had 200 rushing yards (3.8 yards per attempt), 601 receiving yards (17.2 yards per reception), with two rushing touchdowns and five receiving touchdowns.

Future Hall of Fame Texans' coach Hank Stram moved Robinson to free safety after his second year, because Stram needed to bolster the Texans' defense. Robinson had only played on offense for the Texans in his first two seasons. Robinson continued as a standout safety for next ten seasons. He started 12 games at free safety in 1962, with four interceptions and one fumble recovery. In his second regular season game at free safety, he intercepted two passes against the Oakland Raiders. The Texans won the 1962 AFL title with a 20–17 double-overtime victory over the two-time defending AFL champion Houston Oilers in the longest professional football league championship game ever played. Robinson had two interceptions in that game. The dramatic game was watched by millions on television, and played an important part in creating the grounds for an AFL–NFL merger.

The Texans moved to Kansas City, Missouri before the 1963 AFL season, becoming the Kansas City Chiefs. Robinson started all 14 games that season, with three interceptions and two fumble recoveries. The team went from a championship to a 5–7–2 record that season, but Robinson was selected as an AFL All-Star for the first time. He was named second-team All-AFL by the Newspaper Enterprise Association (NEA) and United Press International (UPI). In 1964, Robinson suffered rib and hand injuries, and only started 10 games that season. He had two interceptions in a November 22 game against the Houston Oilers, his only two of the season; and did not play another game that season. Robinson was still named an AFL All-Star that season. The team's record improved to 7–7.

Robinson started every regular season game for the Chiefs from 1965 to 1971, his final year in professional football. In 1965, he had five interceptions and one fumble recovery; and the Chiefs' record improved to 7–5–2. He had two interceptions in a mid-October game against the Buffalo Bills, and two interceptions in a mid-November game against the San Diego Chargers. He was named first-team All-AFL by the AFL and Associated Press (AP), and second-team All-AFL by the NEA and UPI.

In 1966, Robinson was named first-team All-AFL by the AFL, AP, NEA, and UPI, and was again an AFL All-Star. He tied teammate Bobby Hunt for most interceptions in the AFL that season, with 10. Robinson had four games that season in which he intercepted two passes in a single game. In one of those games, a late-September game against the Boston Patriots, he intercepted a Babe Parilli pass and returned it 29 yards for a touchdown.

The Chiefs won the AFL championship in 1966, with an 11–2–1 record and then a 31–7 victory over the Buffalo Bills in the 1966 AFL Championship Game. The turning point in the championship game occurred in the second quarter when Robinson intercepted a Jack Kemp pass at the goal line, which Robinson then returned 72 yards. The Chiefs were ahead 14–7 before that play, and in addition to preventing another touchdown for the Bills that would have tied the game, Robinson's interception and return set up a successful field goal attempt by the Chiefs, giving them a 17–7 lead. The Chiefs then played in the first Super Bowl in mid-January 1967; a loss to the Green Bay Packers in which Robinson had nine tackles.

In 1967, the AP, NEA, and UPI again named Robinson first-team All-AFL, and he was again selected as an AFL All-Star. He had two interceptions in an early October game against the Miami Dolphins. Robinson suffered numerous injuries during his career, with one of his worst being a head injury in 1967 that led to frequent dizzy spells. He still started every game that season, with five interceptions and three fumble recoveries. The Chiefs' finished the season 9–5.

In 1968, the AP, NEA and UPI selected him first-team All-AFL; as did The Sporting News and Pro Football Weekly. Pro Football Weekly also named Robinson first-team All-NFL/AFL. Robinson had six interceptions (tied for fifth in the AFL) and two fumble recoveries that season. He had two interceptions in a late October game against the Chargers. The Chiefs won their division with a 12–2 record, but lost in the first round of the playoffs to the Oakland Raiders, 41–6.

In 1969, the final year of the AFL's independent existence before merging with the NFL, Robinson was tied for second in the AFL with eight interceptions, second only to teammate Emmitt Thomas; and had a league-leading 158 interception return yards. He has two interceptions in the season's first game against the Chargers, two in a game against the Oilers in mid-October, and two in a game against the Bills in early November. The AP, NEA, Pro Football Weekly, The Sporting News, and UPI selected him first-team All-AFL. The Hall of Fame named him first-team All-NFL/AFL and the NEA named him second-team All-NFL/AFL.

The Chiefs were 11–3 during the 1969 season. The Chiefs' defense was first in the AFL in allowing the fewest points, fewest total yards, fewest rushing yards, and fewest passing yards; and had the most quarterback sacks. Six members of that Chiefs' defense, including Robinson, would eventually be inducted into the Pro Football Hall of Fame. They defeated the defending Super Bowl Champion New York Jets in the first round of the 1969 AFL playoffs, 13–6. The Chiefs won the 1969 AFL Championship Game over the Oakland Raiders, 10–6; becoming the only team in AFL history to win three championships.

The Chiefs next played in Super Bowl IV against the heavily favored Minnesota Vikings. The underdog Chiefs decisively defeated the Minnesota Vikings, 23–7. Robinson played that game with three broken ribs he received in the previous game, and took novocaine injections to dull the pain for the Super Bowl. Late in the first half, he picked up a Minnesota fumble, and in the second half made an interception to help seal the win. This was the last game ever played by an American Football League team. In 2019, the 1969 Chiefs were selected as the 27th greatest all-time team by the NFL.

In his first NFL season (1970), Robinson led the league with 10 interceptions. In the second game of the season against the eventual Super Bowl V champion Baltimore Colts, he intercepted three passes and returned a fumble recovery for a touchdown. Later that season, he intercepted two passes in a game against the Pittsburgh Steelers, and three passes in a game against the Denver Broncos. He was selected first-team All-Pro by the AP, NEA, Pro Football Weekly, and the Pro Football Writers of America.

In 1971, his final professional season, Robinson had four interceptions. The Sporting News named him first-team All-AFC. His last game came in the divisional round of the 1971–72 NFL playoffs, on Christmas Day 1971.The Chiefs lost to the Miami Dolphins 24–27 after 22 minutes and forty seconds of overtime. Robinson suffered a career-ending groin injury that game, which remains the longest game in NFL history (through 2025), and the last NFL game in Municipal Stadium. Robinson thus played in the sport's longest championship game in 1962, and in its absolute longest game, each game closing out professional football in its respective stadium.

After twelve seasons with the same franchise, Robinson retired at age 33 in July 1972, prior to training camp. He had not recovered from the injury suffered in the 1971 playoff game against the Dolphins. He was the last Chief also to have played for the 1960 Dallas Texans. Robinson had 57 interceptions during his ten years playing safety, returning them for 741 yards and one touchdown. He also had 12 fumble recoveries, one of which he returned for a touchdown.

== Legacy ==
Robinson was elected into the Pro Football Hall Of Fame in February 2019, the ninth member inducted from the 1969 Chiefs. After being passed over six times in the 1980s, the Hall of Fame seniors committee elected Robinson. At his August 2019 induction, Robinson said "'After all this time, I though I had been forgotten . . . To receive that knock on the door ... was surreal to me'". Dallas Cowboys' executive Gil Brandt, who had scouted Robinson in college and was inducted into the Hall of Fame with Robinson in 2019 said Robinson was one of the 100 best players in professional football history, and that Robinson redefined the safety position. At the time they were inducted, after observing that when Robinson started playing safety the position was not as big a factor as it later became, Brandt said that Robinson "'was a big factor in the game and should have been here years and years and years ago'". Fellow 2019 Hall of Fame inductee and safety Ed Reed described Robinson as a "paver" at safety.

Robinson is a member of the All-time All-AFL Team and one of only 20 players who were in the AFL for its entire ten-year existence. He is one of only three players (with Hall of Famers Jim Otto and Ron Mix) who were on the All-AFL first-team and the combined AFL/NFL All-Decade Team for the 1960s. He was a five-time first-team All-AFL selection (1965, 1966, 1967, 1968, 1969), one-time first-team NFL All-Pro selection (1970), and one-time second-team All-AFL selection (1963). The Sporting News named him first-team All-AFC in 1971.

He had the third most interceptions in AFL history, and is tied for 13th all-time in AFL/NFL history in interceptions (as of 2025). His 57 interceptions is second most in Chiefs' history, behind only fellow Hall of Fame defensive back Emmitt Thomas's 58. The Chiefs had a 35–1–1 record in games where Robinson made an interception.

Robinson was inducted into the Chiefs Hall of Honor in 1974. He is an inductee of the Louisiana State University Athletic Hall of Fame, the Louisiana Sports Hall of Fame, and the Missouri Sports Hall of Fame. His bust at the Pro Football Hall of Fame in Canton was sculpted by Scott Myers. After being elected into the Pro Football Hall of Fame, in 2019 he also was recognized as an SEC Football Legend for LSU.

== Scout and coach ==
After he retired as a player, Robinson was a scout for the Chiefs until Hank Stram was fired in 1974. He then coached defensive backs for the Jacksonville Express of the World Football League in 1975. The league folded that year, and he became a scout for the New Orleans Saints, again under Stram.

== Career statistics ==
Legend
	Won the AFL championship
	AFL & Super Bowl champion
	Led the league
**Bold**	Career high

Year	Team	League	GP	Int	Yds	TD	Lng
1960	DAT	AFL	14	—	—	—	—
1961	DAT	AFL	14	—	—	—	—
1962	DAT	AFL	14	4	25	0	20
1963	KC	AFL	14	3	41	0	19
1964	KC	AFL	10	2	17	0	17
1965	KC	AFL	14	5	99	0	50
1966	KC	AFL	14	10	136	1	29
1967	KC	AFL	14	5	17	0	10
1968	KC	AFL	14	6	40	0	16
1969	KC	AFL	14	8	158	0	33
1970	KC	NFL	14	10	155	0	57
1971	KC	NFL	14	4	53	0	29
Career			164	57	741	1	57

== Personal and later life ==
During his career, Robinson owned a health club in Kansas City, Kansas. Robinson became an ordained minister in 1979. He founded and operated a youth home called Johnny Robinson's Boys Home for troubled boys in Monroe, Louisiana, and has been a long-time supporter of children's causes. Thousands of children were served by Robinson's youth home, and many continued to refer to him as "Dad" over the years.

Robinson has endured numerous health issues after his playing career: arthritis in his spine, thyroid cancer, non-Hodgkin lymphoma, a quadruple bypass and a severe stroke. The stroke came years before his induction into the Hall of Fame in 2019, which had limited his speaking ability. At the induction ceremony, the 81-year old Robinson said "'I guess everyone knows that I had a stroke, and sometimes my speech is difficult. But I'm honored to be in the Hall of Fame. Better late than never'".
