= 1962 Oakland Raiders season =

AFL team season

- Owner: F. Wayne Valley
- General manager: Wesley Fry
- Head coach: Marty Feldman (5 games, fired); Red Conkright (interim for final 9 games)
- Home stadium: Frank Youell Field

Results
- Record: 1–13
- Division place: 4th AFL Western
- Playoffs: Did not qualify

The 1962 Oakland Raiders season was their third season in Oakland and in the American Football League, and their first at Frank Youell Field in Oakland, their home for four seasons.

Attempting to improve on their 2–12 record from the previous season, the Raiders lost their first thirteen games and finally won in the season finale, a 20–0 shutout of the visiting Boston Patriots, a team with nine wins. The victory in the rain and mud snapped their nineteen-game losing streak.

Oakland's .071 winning percentage remains the lowest in the ten-season history of the AFL. The Raiders did not return to the bottom of their division for over three decades, when they were an NFL team in the AFC West division in 1995, the prologue of their second and last stint in Oakland.

This was the first season that the jerseys only featured the players' surname as opposed to their full name which had been used the previous two seasons.

== Season schedule ==
Week	Date	Opponent	Result	Record	Venue	Attendance	Recap
1	September 9	New York Titans	**L** 17–28	0–1	Frank Youell Field	12,893	Recap
2	Bye						
3	September 23	**Dallas Texans**	**L** 16–26	0–2	Frank Youell Field	12,500	Recap
4	September 30	**San Diego Chargers**	**L** 33–42	0–3	Frank Youell Field	13,000	Recap
5	October 5	at **Denver Broncos**	**L** 7–44	0–4	Bears Stadium	22,452	Recap
6	October 14	**Denver Broncos**	**L** 6–23	0–5	Frank Youell Field	7,000	Recap
7	October 20	at Buffalo Bills	**L** 6–14	0–6	War Memorial Stadium	21,037	Recap
8	October 26	at Boston Patriots	**L** 16–26	0–7	Boston University Field	12,514	Recap
9	November 4	at New York Titans	**L** 21–31	0–8	Polo Grounds	18,247	Recap
10	November 11	Houston Oilers	**L** 20–28	0–9	Frank Youell Field	11,000	Recap
11	November 18	Buffalo Bills	**L** 6–10	0–10	Frank Youell Field	12,500	Recap
12	November 25	at **Dallas Texans**	**L** 7–35	0–11	Cotton Bowl	13,557	Recap
13	December 2	at **San Diego Chargers**	**L** 21–31	0–12	Balboa Stadium	17,874	Recap
14	December 9	at Houston Oilers	**L** 17–32	0–13	Jeppesen Stadium	27,400	Recap
15	December 16	Boston Patriots	**W** 20–0	1–13	Frank Youell Field	8,000	Recap
Note: Intra-division opponents are in **bold** text.

== Game summaries ==
=== Week 14 ===
Team	1	2	3	4	Total
Patriots	0	0	0	0	0
• Raiders	3	7	7	3	20

- Date: December 16
- Location: Frank Youell Field
- Game weather: 56 °F (13 °C); wind 7 mph (11 km/h)

Scoring summary
Q1	OAK	Agajanian 19 yard field goal	OAK 3–0
Q2	OAK	Daniels 74 yard pass from Davidson (Agajanian kick)	OAK 10–0
Q3	OAK	Daniels 7 yard run (Agajanian kick)	OAK 17–0
Q4	OAK	Agajanian 21 yard field goal	OAK 20–0

== Standings ==
AFL Western Division
	W	L	T	PCT	DIV	PF	PA	STK
Dallas Texans	11	3	0	.786	5–1	389	233	W2
Denver Broncos	7	7	0	.500	4–2	353	334	L5
San Diego Chargers	4	10	0	.286	3–3	314	392	L2
Oakland Raiders	1	13	0	.071	0–6	213	370	W1

Note: Tie games were not officially counted in the standings in the AFL.

== Players ==
1962 Oakland Raiders roster
Quarterbacks (QB): 19 Cotton Davidson; 14 Hunter Enis; Running backs (RB): 35 Clem Daniels; 21 Hal Lewis; 37 Alan Miller; 40 Bo Roberson WR; 20 Willie Simpson; Wide receivers (WR): 42 Dobie Craig; 21 Dick Dorsey; Tight ends (TE): 84 Max Boydston	Offensive linemen (OL): 76 Charles Brown T; 67 Stan Campbell G; 69 Dan Ficca G; 65 Wayne Hawkins G; 70 Pete Nicklas T; 00 Jim Otto; 75 Jack Stone T; Defensive linemen (DL): 80 Dalva Allen DE; 53 Dan Birdwell DE; 88 Jon Jelacic DE; 74 Jim Norris DT; 71 Joe Novsek DE; 77 George Shirkey DT	Linebackers (LB): 44 Bob Dougherty OLB; 92 Riley Morris OLB; 32 Charlie Rieves OLB; 49 Jackie Simpson MLB/K; Defensive backs (DB): 27 George Boynton CB; 28 Bob Garner CB; 35 Tom Morrow FS/P; 23 Hank Rivera SS; 24 Fred Williamson CB; Special teams (ST): 3 Ben Agajanian K	Practice squad: 12 Chon Gallegos QB; 86 John White TE; Reserve: 15 Tom Flores QB (NF-Ill.); Gene White RB (IR); 43 Bob Coolbaugh WR (IR); Herm Urenda WR (Military); 73 Chuck McMurtry DT (IR); 79 Orville Trask DT (IR); 25 Vern Valdez S (IR); Rookies in italics
