= 1962 Denver Broncos season =

American football team season

- Owner: Gerald Phipps
- General manager: Jack Faulkner
- Head coach: Jack Faulkner
- Home stadium: Bears Stadium

Results
- Record: 7–7
- Division place: 2nd AFL Western
- Playoffs: Did not qualify

The 1962 Denver Broncos season was the third season for the team in the American Football League (AFL). They finished with their best record of the decade with seven wins and seven losses, finishing second in the AFL's Western Division. The Broncos started the season strong with a record of 6–1, but went in reverse in the second half of the season with a 1–6 record. Despite this, head coach Jack Faulkner was named AFL Coach of the Year.

The 1962 season was the year in which Denver switched to their orange and blue color scheme, abandoning the brown and mustard yellow color scheme of the franchise's first two seasons. Orange and blue have been used as the team's primary colors ever since.

== Offseason ==
=== 1962 AFL draft ===
1962 Denver Broncos draft
Round	Pick	Player	Position	College	Notes
1	2	Merlin Olsen ^{†}	DT	Utah State	Selected with 4th pick in 1962 NFL draft by the Los Angeles Rams
2	10	Jerry Hillebrand	LB	Colorado	
3	18	Charles Holmes	RB	Maryland Eastern Shore	
4	26	John Furman	QB	Texas-El Paso	
7	50	John McGeever	DB	Auburn	
8	58	Elbert Harris	RB	Southeastern Louisiana	
9	66	Larry Jepson	C	Furman	
10	74	Gale Weidner	QB	Colorado	
11	82	Mike Kline	OG	Oregon State	
13	98	Bob Cegelski	C	Montana State	
14	106	Sonny Gibbs	QB	Texas Christian	
15	114	Bill Louden	OG	Benedictine (KS)	
16	122	Gary Ballman	WR	Michigan State	
17	130	Jerry Tarr	WR	Oregon	
18	138	Pete Schenck	DB	Washington State	
20	154	Mike Martin	OT	Washington State	
21	162	Jim Perkins	OT	Colorado	
22	170	Don Kasso	RB	Oregon State	
23	178	Ken Tureaud	RB	Michigan	
24	186	Neil Thomas	OG	Hillsdale	
25	194	Dave Edwards	LB	Auburn	
26	202	Jim Roberts	OT	Mississippi	
27	210	Andy Von Sonn	LB	UCLA	
28	218	Paul Holmes	OT	Georgia	
29	226	Lynn Hoyem	OG	Long Beach State	
30	234	Walt Mince	DB	Maryland State	
31	242	Bill Williamson	OT	Bakersfield JC (CA)	
32	250	Vester Flanagan	OT	Humboldt State	
33	258	Duane Allen	TE	Santa Ana JC (CA)	
34	266	Steve Stonebreaker	LB	Detroit Mercy	
Made roster † Pro Football Hall of Fame * Made at least one Pro Bowl during career

== Personnel ==
=== Staff / Coaches ===
1962 Denver Broncos staff
Front office: Chairman of the Board – Gerald Phipps; President – Calvin W Kunz Jr; Vice President – Earl R Howsam; Director of Player Personnel – Ray Malavasi; Head coaches: General manager/Head Coach – Jack Faulkner; Offensive coaches: Offensive Ends – Mac Speedie; Offensive Line – Jim Martin	Defensive coaches: Defensive Line – Dale Dodrill; Defensive Backfield – Gary Glick

=== Roster ===
1962 Denver Broncos roster
Quarterbacks (QB): 17 George Shaw; 18 Frank Tripucka; Running backs (RB): 35 Bo Dickinson; 42 Al Frazier; 21 Gene Mingo P; 0 Johnny Olszewski; 36 James Stinnette; 34 Donnie Stone; Wide receivers (WR): 82 Bob Scarpitto; 41 Jerry Tarr; 87 Lionel Taylor; Tight ends (TE): 88 Gene Prebola	Offensive linemen (OL): 52 Jim Barton C; 75 Eldon Danenhauer T; 65 John Denvir LG; 67 Bob McCullough G; 71 Jim Perkins T; 72 Jerry Sturm G/T; Defensive linemen (DL): 66 John Cash DE; 61 Chuck Gavin DE; 74 Gordy Holz DT; 73 Ike Lassiter DE/DT; 64 Bud McFadin DT	Linebackers (LB): 68 Tom Erlandson OLB; 55 Jim Fraser OLB/P; 54 Wahoo McDaniel MLB; 68 Bill Roehnelt OLB; 62 Jerry Stalcup OLB/MLB; Defensive backs (DB): 23 Goose Gonsoulin FS; 43 Chuck Marshall CB; 47 John McGeever CB; 45 Jim McMillin CB; 46 Bob Zeman SS; Special teams (ST)	Reserve: 60 Ken Adamson G (IR); 77 Jackie Mattox T (IR); Rookies in italics

== Regular season ==
Week	Date	Opponent	Result	Record	Venue	Attendance	Recap
1	September 7	**San Diego Chargers**	**W** 30–21	1–0	University of Denver Stadium	28,000	Recap
2	September 15	at Buffalo Bills	**W** 23–20	2–0	War Memorial Stadium	30,577	Recap
3	September 21	Boston Patriots	**L** 16–41	2–1	Boston University Field	21,038	Recap
4	September 30	at New York Titans	**W** 32–10	3–1	Polo Grounds	17,213	Recap
5	October 5	**Oakland Raiders**	**W** 44–7	4–1	Bears Stadium	22,452	Recap
6	October 14	at **Oakland Raiders**	**W** 23–6	5–1	Frank Youell Field	7,000	Recap
7	October 21	Houston Oilers	**W** 20–10	6–1	Bears Stadium	34,496	Recap
8	October 28	Buffalo Bills	**L** 38–45	6–2	Bears Stadium	26,051	Recap
9	November 4	at **San Diego Chargers**	**W** 23–20	7–2	Balboa Stadium	20,827	Recap
10	November 11	Boston Patriots	**L** 29–33	7–3	Bears Stadium	28,187	Recap
11	November 18	**Dallas Texans**	**L** 3–24	7–4	Bears Stadium	23,523	Recap
12	November 22	New York Titans	**L** 45–46	7–5	Bears Stadium	15,776	Recap
13	December 2	at Houston Oilers	**L** 17–34	7–6	Jeppesen Stadium	30,650	Recap
14	December 9	at **Dallas Texans**	**L** 10–17	7–7	Cotton Bowl	19,137	Recap
15	Bye						
Note: Intra-division opponents are in **bold** text.

== Standings ==
AFL Western Division
	W	L	T	PCT	DIV	PF	PA	STK
Dallas Texans	11	3	0	.786	5–1	389	233	W2
Denver Broncos	7	7	0	.500	4–2	353	334	L5
San Diego Chargers	4	10	0	.286	3–3	314	392	L2
Oakland Raiders	1	13	0	.071	0–6	213	370	W1

Note: Tie games were not officially counted in the standings in the AFL.
