= Bobby Bethune =

American football player (born 1938)

No. 43, 20
- Position: Safety

Personal information
- Born: December 10, 1938 (age 87); Leeds, Alabama, U.S.
- Listed height: 5 ft 11 in (1.80 m)
- Listed weight: 190 lb (86 kg)

Career information
- High school: Leeds
- College: Mississippi State
- NFL draft: 1961: 9th round, 117th overall pick

Career history
- Chicago Bears (1961–1962)*; San Diego Chargers (1962); Tuscaloosa Warriors (1963); Gadsden Raiders (1964); Atlanta/Columbus Mustangs (1965); Huntsville Rockets (1965)
- * Offseason or practice squad member only

Career AFL statistics
- Interceptions: 3
- Stats at Pro Football Reference

Bobby Wayne Bethune (born December 10, 1938) is an American former professional football player who was a safety in the American Football League (AFL) for a single season with the San Diego Chargers. He also played three seasons in minor leagues. He played college football for the Mississippi State Maroons (now Bulldogs).

== College football ==
Bethune played college football at Mississippi State University from 1957 to 1960. He saw most action in his final two years, playing as a halfback on offense and defensive back on defense. With six interceptions in his senior year, Bethune tied for the most in the Southeastern Conference.

== Professional career ==
Bethune was selected 117th overall in the ninth round of the 1961 NFL draft by the Chicago Bears, signing for them shortly afterwards. The Chicago Tribune described him as one of a number of "rangy, fast, agile" defensive backs drafted by the Bears that year. He played in the preseason for the Bears, getting ejected from one game for his role in a fist fight, but was cut before the regular season began. In 1962, he again featured for the Bears in exhibition play but missed the regular season squad. However, Bethune signed with the AFL's Chargers to replace an injured Charlie McNeil in the defensive backfield, and played the only games of his career in a major league, making ten appearances and intercepting three passes.

Subsequently, Bethune appeared for three teams in the Southern Professional Football League and one in the North American Football League.
