= Jerry Cornelison =

American football player (born 1936)

No. 58, 74
- Position: Offensive tackle

Personal information
- Born: September 13, 1936 (age 90); Dallas, Texas, U.S.
- Listed height: 6 ft 4 in (1.93 m)
- Listed weight: 250 lb (113 kg)

Career information
- High school: Temple (Temple, Texas)
- College: SMU (1954–1957)
- NFL draft: 1958: 16th round, 192nd overall pick

Career history
- Saskatchewan Roughriders (1958); Dallas Texans/Kansas City Chiefs (1960–1965)

Awards and highlights
- AFL champion (1962); AFL All-Star (1962)

Career AFL statistics
- Games played: 70
- Games started: 43
- Stats at Pro Football Reference

Jerry Gale Cornelison (born September 13, 1936) is an American former professional football player whop was an offensive tackle in the Canadian Football League (CFL) and American Football League (AFL). He played college football for the SMU Mustangs.

Although he was selected in the 16th round by the Cleveland Browns of the National Football League (NFL) in the 1958 NFL draft, Cornelison began his professional career with the Saskatchewan Roughriders of the CFL. He then played five seasons in the AFL, from 1960 to 1965, for the Dallas Texans / Kansas City Chiefs. In 1962, he was an AFL All-Star at offensive guard.

== See also ==
- List of American Football League players
