= Brett Carolan =

American football player (born 1971)

No. 86, 84
- Position: Tight end

Personal information
- Born: March 16, 1971 (age 55); San Rafael, California, U.S.
- Listed height: 6 ft 3 in (1.91 m)
- Listed weight: 241 lb (109 kg)

Career information
- High school: Novato (CA) San Marin
- College: Washington State
- NFL draft: 1994: undrafted

Career history
- San Francisco 49ers (1994–1995); Miami Dolphins (1996)

Awards and highlights
- Super Bowl champion (XXIX); Second-team All-Pac-10 (1993)

Career NFL statistics
- Receptions: 7
- Receiving yards: 61
- Touchdowns: 1
- Stats at Pro Football Reference

Brett Carolan (born March 16, 1971) is an American former professional football player who was a tight end for three seasons in the National Football League (NFL) with the San Francisco 49ers and Miami Dolphins. He played college football for the Washington State Cougars. He was a rookie with the 49ers in 1994, when the team won Super Bowl XXIX.

Born and raised in Marin County, Carolan played college football at Washington State University in Pullman.

His father, Reggie Carolan (1939–1983), was a tight end in the American Football League for seven seasons, with the San Diego Chargers and Kansas City Chiefs. He also played college football (and basketball) on the Palouse, at the University of Idaho in Moscow.
