= Abner Haynes =

American football player (1937–2024)

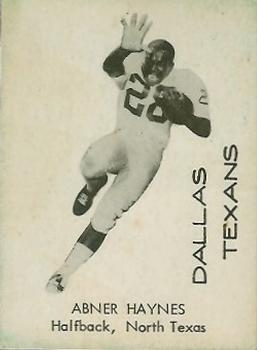
- Haynes displayed on a 1960 card

No. 28
- Positions: Halfback, return specialist

Personal information
- Born: September 19, 1937; Denton, Texas, U.S.
- Died: July 18, 2024 (aged 86); Dallas, Texas, U.S.
- Listed height: 6 ft 0 in (1.83 m)
- Listed weight: 190 lb (86 kg)

Career information
- High school: Lincoln (Dallas, Texas)
- College: North Texas State (1957–1959)
- NFL draft: 1960: 5th round, 55th overall pick
- AFL draft: 1960

Career history
- Dallas Texans / Kansas City Chiefs (1960–1964); Denver Broncos (1965–1966); Miami Dolphins (1967); New York Jets (1967)

Awards and highlights
- AFL champion (1962); AFL Most Valuable Player (1960); AFL Comeback Player of the Year (1964); AFL Rookie of the Year (1960); 3× First-team All-AFL (1960–1962); Second-team All-AFL (1964); 4× AFL All-Star (1960–1962, 1964); 3× AFL rushing touchdowns leader (1960–1962); AFL rushing yards leader (1960); AFL kickoff return yards leader (1965); AFL All-Time Team; 2× First-team All-MVC (1958, 1959); Kansas City Chiefs Hall of Fame; Kansas City Chiefs No. 28 retired; North Texas Mean Green No. 28 retired; AFL records: Most career rushing touchdowns: 46

Career AFL statistics
- Rushing yards: 4,630
- Rushing average: 4.5
- Rushing touchdowns: 46
- Receptions: 287
- Receiving yards: 3,535
- Receiving touchdowns: 20
- Return yards: 3,900
- Return touchdowns: 2
- Stats at Pro Football Reference

Abner Haynes (September 19, 1937 – July 18, 2024) was an American professional football player who was a halfback and return specialist in the American Football League (AFL). He played college football for the North Texas State Eagles and was selected by the Oakland Raiders in the 1960 AFL draft. He was also chosen by the Pittsburgh Steelers in the fifth round of the 1960 NFL draft. Chosen by the Raiders in the draft but signing with the Dallas Texans, Haynes excelled in the AFL, scoring 46 rushing touchdowns in eight seasons while winning league MVP honors in 1960. His 46 rushing touchdowns was the most by a player in AFL history.

== Early life and integration ==
Born in Denton, Texas, Haynes graduated from Lincoln High School in Dallas in 1956. He played college football at North Texas State College in Denton (now the University of North Texas), where he and teammate Leon King integrated college football in the state of Texas in 1957.

== Professional career ==
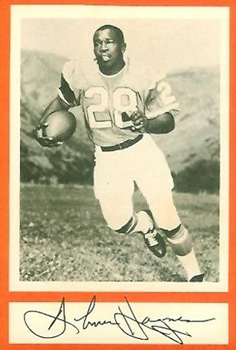
Haynes in 1966 for Denver.

Although selected in the fifth round (55th overall) of the 1960 NFL draft by the Pittsburgh Steelers, Haynes chose to play for the AFL's Dallas Texans, signing his contract with the team under the goal posts of Kidd Field after the 1959 Sun Bowl. Haynes led the AFL in rushing attempts, yards, and TDs in its first year. Haynes' father, a minister, advised that the young man play in the AFL after coach Buddy Parker and quarterback Bobby Layne of the Steelers made a drunken visit to Haynes' house.

Haynes helped popularize the AFL in 1960, when he was the fledgling league's first Player of the Year, and its first Rookie of the Year. He captured the AFL's first rushing crown with 875 yards, and also led the Texans in receiving, punt returns, and kickoff returns. Haynes spent three years in Dallas and two with same franchise when it became the Kansas City Chiefs in 1963. The Chiefs and the North Texas Eagles both retired his number 28 in honor of his many achievements.

"He was a franchise player before they talked about franchise players", praised Stram. "He did it all – rushing, receiving, kickoff returns, punt returns. He gave us the dimension we needed to be a good team in Dallas." The 6-foot (1.83 m), 190-pound (86 kg) Haynes, who had great speed and dazzling moves in the open field, was regularly among the AFL's top 10 rushers (3rd all-time), and set AFL records with 5 touchdowns in a game, 19 in a season in 1961, and 46 in his career. Haynes still owns 10 Texans franchise records, including most points in a game (30), most touchdowns in a game (5), and most career combined yards (8,442). He was Hall of Fame head coach Hank Stram's most versatile and dangerous weapon from 1960 to 1962, amassing 43 touchdowns and 4,472 yards on rushes and receptions. In 1962, he helped the Texans win the AFL championship game in the classic double-overtime victory over the two-time defending champion Houston Oilers. At the time it was the longest professional football championship game ever played. In that game, Haynes scored touchdowns on a 28-yard pass reception from quarterback Len Dawson, and on a 2-yard run.

Another notable game for Haynes was in 1962 on September 30 against the Buffalo Bills at the Cotton Bowl; he ran for 164 yards on just 16 attempts (10+ yards per carry), with two touchdown runs, one of 71 yards and one of 13 yards, in the Texans' 41–21 victory.

Haynes was then traded to the Denver Broncos prior to the 1965 season. Haynes believed that the trade was retribution for his participation in several black players boycotting the 1965 American Football League All-Star game, which was supposed to be in New Orleans, due to the black players' mistreatment by hotels and businesses in New Orleans. The game was quickly moved to Houston after the players' protests. According to Haynes, he received a letter from the Chiefs' organization reprimanding him for his actions, and he was soon traded after. In 1965, he scored three rushing touchdowns, two receiving touchdowns, and returned one punt for a touchdown. He also led the league in kick returns (34), kick return yards (901), kick return average (26.5), and was fourth in the league in all-purpose yards (1,404). On Oct 17, he returned 3 kicks 140 yards for a franchise record 46.7 average. In 1966, he had 304 yards rushing and 480 receiving, but led the league with 11 fumbles and was let go. In 1967, he played for both the Miami Dolphins, and the New York Jets.

During his 8 professional seasons, Haynes carried the ball 1,036 times for 4,630 yards, a 4.5 average; caught 287 passes for 3,535 yards, a 12.3 average, and 20 touchdowns; returned 85 punts for 875 yards, a 10.3 average, and 1 touchdown; and ran back 121 kickoffs for 3,025 yards, a 25.0 average, and 1 touchdown. His 12,065 combined yards is the American Football League record. Haynes had three games in which he gained 100 or more yards on 14 or fewer carries, and was selected to the All-Time All-AFL second-team. He had a program called "Heroes of Football" which connects former professional players with their communities.

In 2019, the Professional Football Researchers Association named Haynes to the PFRA Hall of Very Good Class of 2019.

=== "We'll Kick to the Clock" ===
In the 1962 AFL Championship Game, Haynes made what could have been a costly error at the start of overtime. Coach Stram, aware of the strong winds at Jeppesen Stadium, instructed Haynes, should the Texans win the coin toss, to choose the end of the field facing the stadium clock, which would give the Texans the wind at their backs. (In professional American football, the team winning the coin toss can choose either to elect whether to kickoff or receive the kickoff, or elect which goal to defend. If that team's election is regarding the kickoff, the other team gets to elect which goal to defend; and vice versa.)

The Texans won the coin toss. Haynes, assuming that when the Texans elected which goal to defend, the Oilers would elect to receive the kickoff (thereby gaining first possession of the ball), told the referee, "We'll kick to the clock." However, by starting with the words "We'll kick", Haynes had made the election for the Texans to kick off, allowing the Oilers, not the Texans, to choose which goal to defend. The Texans saved Haynes from embarrassment by not allowing the Oilers to score in that first overtime, then won the game on Tommy Brooker's field goal 2 minutes and 54 seconds into the second overtime (after the teams had switched ends).

When asked about his mistake following the game, Haynes said "I knew we'd need the wind behind us in the sixth quarter."

== AFL career statistics ==
Legend
	Won the AFL championship
	Led the league
**Bold**	Career high

=== Regular season ===
Year	Team	Games		Rushing					Receiving				
Year	Team	GP	GS	Att	Yds	Avg	Lng	TD	Rec	Yds	Avg	Lng	TD
1960	DTX	14	11	156	875	**5.6**	67	9	**55**	**576**	10.5	34	3
1961	DTX	14	12	179	841	4.7	59	9	34	558	**16.4**	69	3
1962	DTX	14	14	**221**	**1,049**	4.7	71	**13**	39	573	14.7	**78**	**6**
1963	KAN	14	7	99	352	3.6	46	4	33	470	14.2	73	2
1964	KAN	14	12	139	697	5.0	**80**	4	38	562	14.8	68	3
1965	DEN	14	1	41	166	4.0	47	3	26	216	8.3	71	2
1966	DEN	14	10	129	304	2.4	20	2	46	480	10.4	52	1
1967	MIA	11	3	56	274	4.9	65	2	16	100	6.3	22	0
1967	NYJ	3	0	16	72	4.5	14	0	0	0	0.0	0	0
Career		112	70	1,036	4,630	4.5	80	46	287	3,535	12.3	78	20

=== Playoffs ===
Year	Team	Games		Rushing					Receiving				
Year	Team	GP	GS	Att	Yds	Avg	Lng	TD	Rec	Yds	Avg	Lng	TD
1962	DTX	1	1	14	26	1.9	14	1	3	45	15.0	28	1
Career		1	1	14	26	1.9	14	1	3	45	15.0	28	1

== Personal life and death ==
Haynes was a cousin of Sly Stone, Rose Stone, and Freddie Stone of Sly and the Family Stone.

Haynes died in Dallas on July 18, 2024, at the age of 86.
