= Reggie Carolan =

American football player (1939–1983)

No. 89, 80
- Position: Tight end

Personal information
- Born: October 25, 1939; San Rafael, California, U.S.
- Died: January 1, 1983 (aged 43); Marin County, California, U.S.
- Listed height: 6 ft 6 in (1.98 m)
- Listed weight: 236 lb (107 kg)

Career information
- High school: San Anselmo (CA); Sir Francis Drake
- College: Idaho
- NFL draft: 1961: 8th round, 102nd overall pick
- AFL draft: 1961: 17th round, 135th overall pick

Career history
- San Diego Chargers (1962-1963); Kansas City Chiefs (1964-1968); Buffalo Bills (1970)*
- * Offseason or practice squad member only

Awards and highlights
- Super Bowl champion (IV); 2× AFL champion (1963, 1966); AFL All-Star (1962); Second-team All-PCC (1961)

Career AFL statistics
- Receptions: 23
- Receiving yards: 364
- Touchdowns: 5
- Stats at Pro Football Reference

Reginald Howard "Stretch" Carolan (October 25, 1939 – January 1, 1983) was an American professional football player, a tight end in the American Football League (AFL). He played seven seasons from 1962 to 1968, the last five with the Kansas City Chiefs.

In college, Carolan starred in football, basketball, and track at the University of Idaho in Moscow, and was drafted by the San Diego Chargers (and Los Angeles Rams) in 1961 while a junior.

As a rookie with the Chargers in 1962, he was selected as an AFL All-Star. He earned a 1966 AFL Championship ring with the Chiefs in their victory over the Buffalo Bills, and played in the first AFL-NFL World Championship Game against the Green Bay Packers, commonly known as Super Bowl I.

Carolan was a graduate of Sir Francis Drake High School in San Anselmo, California, and taught at Tamalpais Union High School District schools during the off-season. While jogging around Phoenix Lake with a friend in Marin County, he went for an extra lap by himself, suffered an epileptic seizure, fell in the lake, and drowned at age 43.

His son Brett Carolan (b.1971) played football at San Marin High School in Novato, at Washington State in Pullman, and in the NFL with the San Francisco 49ers and Miami Dolphins in the 1990s. The Carolans are among 161 pairs of fathers and sons documented at the Pro Football Hall of Fame to have played pro football.

== See also ==
- Other American Football League players
