= Sonny Bishop =

American football player (born 1939)

No. 66
- Position: Offensive lineman

Personal information
- Born: October 1, 1939 (age 87); Winner, South Dakota, U.S.
- Listed height: 6 ft 2 in (1.88 m)
- Listed weight: 245 lb (111 kg)

Career information
- High school: El Cajon Valley (El Cajon, California)
- College: Fresno State
- NFL draft: 1962: 18th round, 249th overall pick
- AFL draft: 1962: 11th round, 88th overall pick

Career history
- Dallas Texans (1962); Oakland Raiders (1963); Houston Oilers (1964-1969); Houston Texans-Shreveport Steamer (1974)

Awards and highlights
- AFL champion (1962); AFL All-Star (1968)

Career AFL statistics
- Games played: 110
- Games started: 91
- Fumble recoveries: 1
- Stats at Pro Football Reference

Ervin Wilfred "Sonny" Bishop (born October 1, 1939) is an American former professional football player who was an offensive lineman in the American Football League (AFL). He played college football for the Fresno State Bulldogs, and played professionally in the AFL for the Dallas Texans and the Oakland Raiders in 1963, and for the Houston Oilers from 1964 through 1969. Bishop was inducted into the Fresno County Athletic Hall of Fame in 1990.

== See also ==
- List of American Football League players
