= Wayne Frazier =

American football player (1939–2012)

No. 51, 56, 66, 53
- Positions: Center, linebacker

Personal information
- Born: March 5, 1939; Evergreen, Alabama, U.S.
- Died: March 11, 2012 (aged 73); Mobile, Alabama, U.S.
- Listed height: 6 ft 3 in (1.91 m)
- Listed weight: 245 lb (111 kg)

Career information
- High school: Hillcrest (Evergreen)
- College: Auburn
- NFL draft: 1961: 16th round, 216th overall pick
- AFL draft: 1962: 32nd round, 256th overall pick

Career history
- San Diego Chargers (1962-1964); Houston Oilers (1965); Kansas City Chiefs (1966-1967); Buffalo Bills (1967)

Awards and highlights
- AFL champion (1966)

Career AFL statistics
- Games played: 48
- Games started: 42
- Fumble recoveries: 1
- Stats at Pro Football Reference

William Wayne "Cotton" Frazier Sr. (March 5, 1939 – March 11, 2012) was an American professional football center who played four seasons in the American Football League (AFL) from 1962 to 1967.

He started with the San Diego Chargers, was traded to the Houston Oilers, then to the Buffalo Bills, and finally to the Kansas City Chiefs in 1966. After winning the AFL championship with the Chiefs that year, he started for them in the first AFL-NFL World Championship Game. He later served as head coach at W. S. Neal High School in East Brewton and led the Eagles to a 23–17 record from 1980 to 1983.

William Wayne Frazier died March 11, 2012, aged 73, in Brewton, Alabama after an extended illness. He was buried at Brownville Memorial Cemetery in Evergreen, Alabama.

== See also ==
- Other American Football League players
