= Gerry McDougall =

American football player (born 1935)

No. 20
- Position: Running back

Personal information
- Born: March 21, 1935; Long Beach, California, U.S.
- Died: February 9, 2024 (aged 88); Madison, Wisconsin, U.S.
- Listed height: 6 ft 3 in (1.91 m)
- Listed weight: 225 lb (102 kg)

Career information
- High school: Long Beach Polytechnic
- College: UCLA

Career history
- 1957–1961: Hamilton Tiger-Cats
- 1962: Toronto Argonauts
- 1962–1964: San Diego Chargers
- 1965–1966: Hamilton Tiger-Cats
- 1967: Edmonton Eskimos

Awards and highlights
- 2× Grey Cup champion (1957, 1965); AFL champion (1963); 2× CFL East All-Star (1957, 1958); National champion (1954)
- Stats at Pro Football Reference

Gerald Gordon McDougall (March 21, 1935 – February 9, 2024) was an American professional football player who was a running back in the American Football League (AFL) and Canadian Football League (CFL) from 1957 through 1967. He was named a CFL Eastern All-Star in 1957 and 1958 while playing for the Hamilton Tiger-Cats. He played college football for the UCLA Bruins.
