= Jerry Robinson (kick returner) =

American football player (1939–2013)

No. 29, 28
- Position: Wide receiver

Personal information
- Born: March 9, 1939; Dodson, Louisiana, U.S.
- Died: January 13, 2013 (aged 73)
- Listed height: 5 ft 11 in (1.80 m)
- Listed weight: 190 lb (86 kg)

Career information
- High school: Jonesboro (LA) Jackson
- College: Grambling State
- NFL draft: 1962: 11th round, 147th overall pick
- AFL draft: 1962: 8th round, 64th overall pick

Career history
- San Diego Chargers (1962-1964); New York Jets (1965)

Awards and highlights
- AFL champion (1963)

Career AFL statistics
- Receptions: 49
- Receiving yards: 799
- Touchdowns: 5
- Stats at Pro Football Reference

Jerry W. Robinson (March 9, 1939 – January 13, 2013) was an American professional football player who played wide receiver for four seasons for the San Diego Chargers and New York Jets.
