= Hezekiah Braxton =

American football player (1934–2013)

No. 33
- Position: Running back

Personal information
- Born: April 11, 1934; Baltimore, Maryland, U.S.
- Died: August 9, 2013 (aged 79); Baltimore, Maryland, U.S.

Career information
- College: Virginia Union University
- AFL draft: 1961: 12th round, 96th overall pick

Career history
- 1962: San Diego Chargers
- 1963: Buffalo Bills
- Stats at Pro Football Reference

Hezekiah Ezekial Braxton, III (April 11, 1934 – August 9, 2013) was an American professional football player who was a running back for two seasons for the San Diego Chargers and Buffalo Bills.
