= Val Keckin =

American football player (born 1938)

No. 16
- Position: Quarterback

Personal information
- Born: February 12, 1938; Los Angeles, California, U.S.
- Died: February 24, 2021 (aged 83); Los Angeles, California, U.S.
- Listed height: 6 ft 4 in (1.93 m)
- Listed weight: 215 lb (98 kg)

Career information
- High school: Alexander Hamilton (Los Angeles)
- College: SMU (1960)
- NFL draft: 1961: 11th round, 152nd overall pick

Career history
- Green Bay Packers (1961)*; Baltimore Colts (1962)*; San Diego Chargers (1962)
- * Offseason or practice squad member only

Career AFL statistics
- Passing attempts: 9
- Passing completions: 5
- Completion percentage: 55.6%
- TD–INT: 0–1
- Passing yards: 64
- Passer rating: 38.4
- Stats at Pro Football Reference

Val Keckin (born Valdemar Christian Keckin) is an American former professional football player who was a quarterback for the San Diego Chargers of the American Football League (AFL) in 1962. He played college football for the SMU Mustangs.
