= Emil Karas =

American football player (1933–1974)

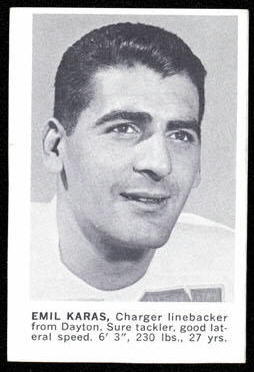

No. 63, 56, 58
- Position: Linebacker

Personal information
- Born: December 13, 1933; Pittsburgh, Pennsylvania, U.S.
- Died: November 25, 1974 (aged 40); San Diego, California, U.S.
- Listed height: 6 ft 3 in (1.91 m)
- Listed weight: 230 lb (104 kg)

Career information
- College: Dayton
- NFL draft: 1959: 3rd round, 28th overall pick

Career history
- Washington Redskins (1959); Los Angeles / San Diego Chargers (1960-1966)

Awards and highlights
- AFL champion (1963); 3× AFL All-Star (1961, 1962, 1963); Los Angeles Chargers Hall of Fame

Career AFL statistics
- Interceptions: 8
- Fumble recoveries: 1
- Sacks: 2.5
- Stats at Pro Football Reference

Emil Karas (December 13, 1933 – November 25, 1974) was an American professional football player who was a linebacker in the National Football League (NFL) for the Washington Redskins and in the American Football League (AFL) with the Los Angeles / San Diego Chargers. He was on the Chargers' 1963 AFL Championship team, and an AFL All-Star in 1961, 1962, and 1963. Karas played college football at the University of Dayton and was drafted in the third round of the 1959 NFL draft. He died of pancreatic cancer on November 25, 1974, at age 40.
