= Bob Jackson (American football) =

American football player (born 1940)

No. 40, 32, 46, 33
- Position: Running back

Personal information
- Born: March 16, 1940 (age 86); Shreveport, Louisiana, U.S.
- Listed height: 6 ft 3 in (1.91 m)
- Listed weight: 238 lb (108 kg)

Career information
- High school: Turner (TX)
- College: New Mexico State
- NFL draft: 1962: 2nd round, 19th overall pick
- AFL draft: 1962: 7th round, 56th overall pick

Career history
- San Diego Chargers (1962-1963); Houston Oilers (1964); Oakland Raiders (1964); Houston Oilers (1965); Orange County Ramblers (1967–1968); New Orleans Saints (1968)*; Portland Loggers (1969)
- * Offseason or practice squad member only

Awards and highlights
- AFL champion (1963); Continental Football League MVP (1967)

Career AFL statistics
- Rushing yards: 624
- Rushing average: 3.4
- Receptions: 32
- Receiving yards: 333
- Total touchdowns: 16
- Stats at Pro Football Reference

Robert Dean Jackson (born March 16, 1940) is an American former professional football [player who was a running back in the American Football League (AFL). He played college football for the New Mexico State Aggies football. He played four seasons in the AFL for the San Diego Chargers (1962–1963), the Houston Oilers (1964, 1965), and the Oakland Raiders (1964).

Jackson also played in the Continental Football League (COFL) for three seasons for the Orange County Ramblers (1967–1968) and the Portland Loggers (1969). He won the league Most valuable player award for the 1967 season.
