= John Denvir (American football) =

American football player (1938–2014)

No. 65
- Position: Guard

Personal information
- Born: April 30, 1938; Connellsville, Pennsylvania, U.S.
- Died: December 23, 2014 (aged 76); French Camp, California, U.S.
- Listed height: 6 ft 4 in (1.93 m)
- Listed weight: 245 lb (111 kg)

Career information
- High school: Immaculate Conception (PA)
- College: West Virginia (1956); Colorado (1959-1961)
- NFL draft: 1961: 12th round, 168th overall pick
- AFL draft: 1962: 30th round, 240th overall pick

Career history
- Denver Broncos (1962)

Career AFL statistics
- Games played: 11
- Games started: 6
- Stats at Pro Football Reference

John Denvir (born John William Denvir) (April 30, 1938 – December 23, 2014) was a professional American football guard. He played for the Denver Broncos of the American Football League (AFL) during the 1962 AFL season.
