= Jacky Lee =

American football player (1938–2016)

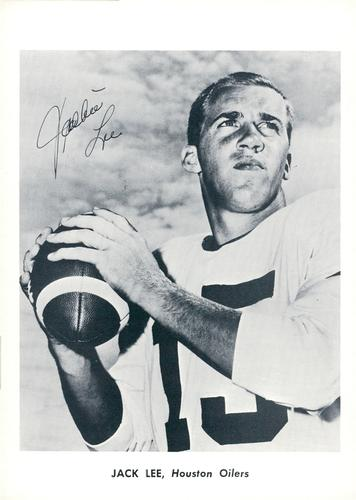

No. 15
- Position: Quarterback

Personal information
- Born: July 11, 1938; Minneapolis, Minnesota, U.S.
- Died: May 2, 2016 (aged 77); Houston, Texas, U.S.
- Listed height: 6 ft 1 in (1.85 m)
- Listed weight: 189 lb (86 kg)

Career information
- High school: Akron (OH) Ellet
- College: Cincinnati
- NFL draft: 1960: 6th round, 61st overall pick
- AFL draft: 1960

Career history
- Houston Oilers (1960–1963); Denver Broncos (1964–1965); Houston Oilers (1966–1967); Kansas City Chiefs (1967–1969)

Awards and highlights
- 3× AFL champion (1960, 1961, 1969); Super Bowl champion (IV)

Career NFL statistics
- Passing attempts: 838
- Passing completions: 430
- Completion percentage: 51.3%
- TD–INT: 46–57
- Passing yards: 6,191
- Passer rating: 65.6
- Stats at Pro Football Reference

Jack Ross Lee (July 11, 1938 – May 2, 2016) was an American professional football player who was a quarterback in the American Football League (AFL) for all ten of its seasons (1960–1969). He played college football for the Cincinnati Bearcats

== College career ==
After playing football, baseball, and basketball at Ellet High School in Akron, Ohio, he played college football at the University of Cincinnati. In 1958–1959, Lee was the Bearcats' most valuable player (MVP) and an all-conference quarterback. In 1960, he was MVP of the Senior Bowl.

== Professional career ==
In 1960, he was the first quarterback ever drafted by the American Football League's Houston Oilers, where he split time with George Blanda in the Oilers' 1960 and 1961 AFL Championship seasons. In 1961, Lee threw for 457 yards against the Boston Patriots, then an AFL record, and set another league record with a 98-yard touchdown to Willard Dewveall against the Chargers. Lee and Blanda combined to throw 38 touchdowns for the Oilers in 1961. Lee played in every game for the Oilers from 1961 to 1963.

In 1964, he was the first and only player to ever be "lend-leased" to another team. He was loaned to the Denver Broncos and returned to the Oilers two years later. While in Denver, Lee threw for 370 yards in one half against the Oakland Raiders.

In 1967, Lee was traded to the Kansas City Chiefs after four games. He spent most of his last three years as the back-up to Len Dawson with the Chiefs. He was part of the 1969 AFL and World Championship (Super Bowl IV) winning team.

He was one of only twenty men who played in each of the ten years of the AFL's existence.

== After football ==
Lee retired in 1970 after a shoulder injury. He went on to have a successful career in commercial real estate in Houston.

Lee died on May 2, 2016, due to complications from Alzheimer's disease.

== See also ==
- Other American Football League players
