= 1962 Houston Oilers season =

NFL team season

- Owner: Bud Adams
- General manager: Pop Ivy
- Head coach: Pop Ivy
- Home stadium: Jeppesen Stadium

Results
- Record: 11–3
- Division place: 1st AFL Eastern
- Playoffs: Lost AFL Championship (vs. Texans) 17–20 (2OT)

The 1962 Houston Oilers season was the third season for the Houston Oilers as a professional American football franchise; For the third consecutive season, the Oilers appeared in the AFL Championship Game, only to lose 20–17 in double overtime to the Dallas Texans. In this season, quarterback George Blanda set the single season record for most interceptions, throwing 42.

== Offseason ==
=== AFL Draft ===
Round	Player	Position	College
1	Ray Jacobs	Defensive Tackle	Howard Payne
2	Earl Gros	Fullback	Louisiana State
3	Pete Case	Tackle	Georgia
4	Gary Cutsinger	Defensive End	Oklahoma State (from Boston)
5	Bill Rice	End	Alabama
6	Ray Pinion	Guard	Texas Christian
7	Gus Gonzales	Guard	Tulane
8	Clyde Brock	Defensive Tackle	Utah State
9	Larry Onesti	Linebacker	Northwestern
10	Bob Moses	End	Texas-Austin
11	John Thomas	Guard	McMurry
12	Jack Collins	Halfback	Texas-Austin
13	Royce Cassell	End	New Mexico State
14	Glynn Griffing	Quarterback	Mississippi
15	Ken Shaffer	Tackle	Marquette
16	Billy Ray Adams	Fullback	Mississippi
17	Bill Miller	Defensive Tackle	New Mexico Highlands
18	Art Perkins	Halfback	North Texas State
19	Bobby Jancik	Defensive back	Lamar Tech
20	Joe Bob Isbell	Guard	Houston
21	Roland Jackson	Fullback	Rice
22	Ken Bolin	Halfback	Houston
23	Bill Van Buren	Center	Iowa
24	Boyd Melvin	Tackle	Northwestern
25	Bob Johnson	Tackle	Rice
26	Harold Hays	Guard	Mississippi Southern
27	Roger McFarland	Halfback	Kansas
28	Gary Henson	End	Colorado
29	Ron Osborne	Tackle	Clemson
30	Bob Clemens	Halfback	Pittsburgh
31	Al Kimbrough	Halfback	Northwestern
32	Al Lerderle	End	Georgia Tech
33	Don Talbert	Tackle	Texas

=== Roster ===
1962 Houston Oilers roster
Quarterbacks: 16 George Blanda K; 15 Jacky Lee; Running backs: 20 Billy Cannon; 32 Dave Smith; 44 Charlie Tolar; Wide receivers: 88 Willard Dewveall; 28 Charley Frazier; 89 Bill Groman; 87 Charley Hennigan; Tight ends: 81 Bob McLeod	Offensive linemen: 55 John Frongillo C/G; 70 Al Jamison T; 77 Rich Michael T; 52 Bob Schmidt C; 76 Walter Suggs T; 61 Bob Talamini G; 63 Hogan Wharton G; Defensive linemen: 78 Ed Culpepper DT; 80 Gary Cutsinger DE; 75 Don Floyd DE; 73 Bill Herchman DT; 82 Ed Husmann DT; 73 Bob Kelly DT; 84 Bill Miller DT	Linebackers: 33 Gene Babb MLB; 31 Doug Cline OLB; 30 Mike Dukes OLB; 35 Tom Goode OLB; Defensive backs: 40 Tony Banfield CB; 27 Fred Glick FS; 41 Mark Johnston CB; 43 Jim Norton SS/P; 23 Bobby Jancik CB/S	Reserve lists: -- Ray Jacobs DT (IR); 45 Larry Onesti LB (IR); 22 Bob Suci CB/S (IR); 86 Bucky Wegener DE (IR); rookies in italics

== Regular season ==
=== Season schedule ===
Week	Date	Opponent	Result	Record	Venue	Attendance	Recap
1	September 9	at **Buffalo Bills**	**W** 28–23	1–0	War Memorial Stadium	31,236	Recap
2	September 16	at **Boston Patriots**	**L** 21–34	1–1	Harvard Stadium	32,276	Recap
3	September 29	at San Diego Chargers	**W** 42–17	2–1	Balboa Stadium	28,061	Recap
4	Bye						
5	October 7	**Buffalo Bills**	**W** 17–14	3–1	Jeppesen Stadium	26,350	Recap
6	October 14	**New York Titans**	**W** 56–17	4–1	Jeppesen Stadium	20,650	Recap
7	October 21	at Denver Broncos	**L** 10–20	4–2	Bears Stadium	29,017	Recap
8	October 28	Dallas Texans	**L** 7–31	4–3	Jeppesen Stadium	31,750	Recap
9	November 4	at Dallas Texans	**W** 14–6	5–3	Cotton Bowl	29,017	Recap
10	November 11	at Oakland Raiders	**W** 28–20	6–3	Frank Youell Field	11,000	Recap
11	November 18	**Boston Patriots**	**W** 21–17	7–3	Jeppesen Stadium	35,250	Recap
12	November 25	San Diego Chargers	**W** 33–27	8–3	Jeppesen Stadium	28,235	Recap
13	December 2	Denver Broncos	**W** 34–17	9–3	Jeppesen Stadium	30,650	Recap
14	December 9	Oakland Raiders	**W** 32–17	10–3	Jeppesen Stadium	27,400	Recap
15	December 15	at **New York Titans**	**W** 44–10	11–3	Polo Grounds	8,167	Recap
Note: Intra-division opponents are in **bold** text.

== Standings ==
AFL Eastern Division
	W	L	T	PCT	DIV	PF	PA	STK
Houston Oilers	11	3	0	.786	5–1	387	270	W7
Boston Patriots	9	4	1	.692	4–1–1	346	295	L1
Buffalo Bills	7	6	1	.538	1–4–1	309	272	W2
New York Titans	5	9	0	.357	1–5	278	423	L3

Note: Tie games were not officially counted in the standings in the AFL.

== Postseason ==
=== AFL Championship Game ===
	1	2	3	4	OT	2OT	Total
Texans	3	14	0	0	0	3	20
Oilers	0	0	7	10	0	0	17

Dallas Texans 20, Houston Oilers 17 (2OT)

December 23, 1962, at Jeppesen Stadium, Houston, Texas
Attendance: 37,981

Scoring

- DAL – Field goal Brooker 16 3-0
- DAL – Haynes 28 pass from Dawson (Brooker kick) 10-0
- DAL – Haynes 2 run (Brooker kick) 17-0
- HOU – Dewveall 15 pass from Blanda (Blanda kick) 17-7
- HOU – Field goal Blanda 31 17-14
- HOU – Tolar 1 run (Blanda kick) 17-17
- DAL – Field goal Brooker 25 2OT 20-17
