= 1962 American Football League Championship Game =

AFL Championship Game

Coordinates: 29.722°N 95.349°W

1962 AFL Championship Game
Dallas Texans (Western) (11–3)	Houston Oilers (Eastern) (11–3)
20	17
Head coach: Hank Stram	Head coach: Pop Ivy
	1	2	3	4	OT	2OT	Total
DAL	3	14	0	0	0	3	20
HOU	0	0	7	10	0	0	17
- Date: December 23, 1962
- Stadium: Jeppesen Stadium; Houston, Texas
- Referee: Harold Bourne
- Attendance: 37,981

TV in the United States
- Network: ABC
- Announcers: Curt Gowdy, Paul Christman, and Jack Buck

The 1962 AFL Championship Game was played on December 23 at Jeppesen Stadium in Houston, Texas. The Western Division's Dallas Texans (11–3) defeated the host Houston Oilers of the Eastern Division (also 11–3) by a score of 20–17 after two overtimes. The Oilers were trying for their third consecutive American Football League title.

== Background ==
The two teams were the class of the league that year, and they split their regular season series, with the visiting team winning each game. The Texans thumped the Oilers at Houston 31–7 on October 28, and the next week the Oilers returned the favor with a 14–6 win at the Cotton Bowl.

Dallas was coached by the erudite Hank Stram, and featured players on offense included Abner Haynes, quarterback Len Dawson, and rookie running back Curtis McClinton, a powerful 230 lb (104 kg) All-American from Kansas. The defense showcased Johnny Robinson and E. J. Holub.

Houston was coached by Frank "Pop" Ivy, the third head coach of the Oilers in three seasons. The team featured a host of offensive talent with veteran quarterback George Blanda, Charlie Tolar, the fleet-footed Billy Cannon, Charlie Hennigan, and unheralded Willard Dewveall. Jeppesen Stadium ticket takers counted 37,981 fans in attendance. Astronaut Gus Grissom placed the ball on the kicking tee as the honorary referee.^{1 2 3}

Houston entered the game as a 6 1/2-point favorite.

== Game summary ==
At the time, it was the longest game in the history of professional American football, and remains the longest professional championship game (and third-longest professional game) in the history of the sport.

=== First quarter ===
Early in the game both teams relied on the run. Houston with Tolar and Cannon gained the advantage and advanced the ball to the Dallas 4-yard line. The Dallas defense rose to the occasion and hit Blanda as he attempted to pass causing the ball to wobble right into the eager arms of the Texans' EJ Holub for an interception. Holub scrambled upfield but Houston's Al Jamison saved a touchdown by knocking Holub out of bounds at midfield. Len Dawson then mixed running and passing to the Houston 8 where Tommy Brooker booted a 16-yard field goal.

Houston started driving again with Tolar and Cannon running, often from a "double wing" backfield formation. The drive stalled and Blanda missed a 47-yard field goal to conclude the 1st quarter.

=== Second quarter ===
When Dallas took possession, Jack Spikes promptly darted around left end for 33 yards, augmented by a 15-yard face mask penalty against Houston. Dawson then hit Abner Haynes, who had lined up as a flanker, on a curl-out pattern and Haynes scooted down the right sideline for 28 yards and a touchdown. Brooker's extra-point made it 10–0, Dallas.

Later, in the quarter, Houston had the ball at their 32, when Blanda lofted a pass deep, but Dave Grayson picked the ball off and returned it to the Houston 29. Dallas kept the ball on the ground, with Haynes scoring his 2nd TD, and Dallas led 17–0. George Blanda would not be deterred and continued to pass, but a 4th down incompletion at the Dallas 25 ended another drive, and any more scoring threats in the first half.

At halftime, AFL Commissioner Joe Foss presented Rookie-Of-The-Year Curtis McClinton and Player-Of-The-Year Len Dawson with Mercury S-55 convertible automobiles.

=== Third quarter ===
The Oilers received the kickoff and Blanda again came out throwing. With Charlie Tolar (an oil-well fire fighter in the off-season)^{3} knocking defenders down and Blanda passing, Houston culminated the drive with a 15-yard pass to Willard Dewveall, closing the gap to 17–7, Dallas.

Later in the third period Haynes fumbled and Houston recovered at the Dallas 20, but Johnny Robinson picked-off Blanda's pass at the goal line and returned in to the Dallas 37.

Dallas kept the ball on the ground in the 2nd half, intending to use up the clock and keep Houston's potent offense off the field. Dallas consistently moved the ball, but could not get into scoring position.

=== Fourth quarter ===
George Blanda using the double wing backfield, had Houston driving again. On a third down pass from the Dallas 24, Johnny Robinson delivered a hard hit to Billy Cannon at the goal line, knocking the ball loose and preventing a touchdown. Blanda then kicked a 31-yard field goal to make it 17–10, Dallas.

Dallas stayed conservative and Blanda continued the aerial assault connecting with Cannon and Hennigan to move to the Dallas 1-yard line. Fullback Charlie Tolar, the "human bowling ball", took the ball in on a 1-yard dive, again knocking defenders out of the way. Blanda's extra-point tied the game at 17–17.

With the clock running down, Dave Grayson blocked a 42-yard field goal attempt by Blanda to end any more scoring threats.

=== Overtime ===
The first overtime started with a potentially damaging gaffe by Dallas captain Abner Haynes, who won the toss and said, "We'll kick to the clock," inadvertently leaving his team with neither the first possession or favorable wind conditions. What Haynes wanted was the wind behind his team, but by saying "We'll kick..." first, he gave the Oilers the choice of having the wind at their backs. As it turned out, it didn't matter. The first overtime went scoreless, but Bill Hull intercepted a Blanda pass to end it with the Texans at the Oilers' 48.

In the second overtime, Jack Spikes picked up ten yards on a pass reception and nineteen yards on a rush. After the Texans ran a couple of plays to position the ball, rookie Tommy Brooker came in on fourth-and-nine, and kicked a 25-yard field goal after 2:54 of the sixth quarter, or 17:54 of sudden-death overtime, to end the game.

The Houston Oilers had come within a hair's breadth of winning the first three AFL championships, but the Texans prevailed, 20–17, in their last game before moving north to Missouri to become the Kansas City Chiefs. They would win the AFL title again in 1966 and 1969, gaining berths in the first and fourth Super Bowls.

As of 2026, this game remains the longest championship game in either AFL or NFL history, with neither of the two Super Bowls that went into overtime (LI and LVIII) requiring a sixth quarter. (Coincidentally, the longest Super Bowl and second-longest championship game in pro football history, Super Bowl LVIII, was won by the modern-day Chiefs with just 3 seconds left in the first overtime.)

Dallas Texans 20, Houston Oilers 17

Quarter	1	2	3	4	OT	2OT	Total
Texans	3	14	0	0	0	3	20
Oilers	0	0	7	10	0	0	17

at Jeppesen Stadium, Houston, Texas

- Date: December 23, 1962
- Game time: 2 p.m. CST
- Game weather: Overcast, cold 45 °F (7.2 °C), relative humidity 80%, wind 6 mph
- Game attendance: 37,981
- Referee: Harold Bourne
- TV announcers (ABC): Curt Gowdy, Paul Christman, and Jack Buck
- Pro-Football-Reference.com

Game information

Scoring

- First quarter
  - DAL – Tommy Brooker 16-yard field goal 4:28. Texans 3–0
- Second quarter
  - DAL – Abner Haynes 28-yard pass from Len Dawson (Brooker kick). Texans 10–0
  - DAL – Abner Haynes 2-yard rush (Brooker kick), 17–0 DAL
- Third quarter
  - HOU – Willard Dewveall 15-yard pass from George Blanda (Blanda kick). Texans 17–7
- Fourth quarter
  - HOU – George Blanda 31-yard field goal. Texans 17–10
  - HOU – Charlie Tolar 1-yard rush (Blanda kick). Tied 17–17
- First overtime
- Second overtime
  - DAL – Tommy Brooker 25-yard field goal. ''Texans 20–17

Top passers

- DAL – Len Dawson – 9/14, 88 yards, 1 TD
- HOU – George Blanda – 23/46, 261 yards, 1 TD, 5 INT

Top rushers

- DAL – Jack Spikes – 11 rushes, 77 yards
- HOU – Charley Tolar – 17 rushes, 58 yards, 1 TD

Top receivers

- DAL – Abner Haynes – 3 receptions, 45 yards, 1 TD
- HOU – Willard Dewveall – 6 receptions, 95 yards, 1 TD

== Players' shares ==
The overflow attendance of nearly 38,000 brought a gate of about $170,000 ($1.81 million in 2025 dollars). The winning Texans players each made $2,261 ($24,065 in 2025 dollars), while the Oilers received $1,471 each ($15,657 in 2025 dollars) . These shares were less than half of those for the NFL title game in 1962, at $5,888 and $4,166 each.

== Statistics ==
Statistics	Texans	Oilers
First Downs	19	21
Rushing yards	199	98
Yards per carry	3.6	3.2
Passing yards	88	261
Sack Yds Lost	6-50	0-0
Total yards	237	359
Fumbles-Lost	2–1	0–0
Turnovers	1	5
Penalties-Yards	6–42	6–50

== Aftermath ==
While the Texans were relatively more successful in town over the NFL's Dallas Cowboys, team owner Lamar Hunt realized that Dallas would not be a two-team town for football. In February of 1962, the Texans moved to Kansas City, Missouri and changed their name to the Chiefs in honor of the mayor H. Roe Bartle, who was often nicknamed "The Chief". The Chiefs would return to the AFL Championship 4 years later in 1966 to earn a trip to Super Bowl I.

The Oilers would go on to have four straight losing seasons before making it the AFL Championship game again in 1967, where they would lose to the Oakland Raiders.

As of 2026, this is the last title game (Note: In this context, title game refers to pre-merger AFL and NFL Championship Games up to and including the 1969 season as well as post-merger AFC and NFC Championship Games from the 1970 season onward. The city of Houston however has hosted the Super Bowl three times, doing so in Super Bowl VII, Super Bowl XXXVIII, and Super Bowl LI.) to have been played in Houston, and also the last title game hosted by the Oilers/Titans franchise, which moved to Tennessee after the 1996 season (they have played in the AFC Championship Game three times since the move, all on the road). The franchise also has yet to win another league championship since the 1961 AFL Championship Game (losing their only Super Bowl appearance 23-16 to the then-St. Louis Rams in Super Bowl XXXIV), giving them the third-longest championship drought in the NFL behind the Arizona Cardinals (last title in 1947) and Detroit Lions (last title in 1957). Meanwhile, the Houston Texans, who commenced play in 2002, are currently the only NFL team which has never played in a post-merger conference championship game.

== See also ==
- 1962 AFL season
- AFL Championship Games
- 1962 NFL Championship Game
- Governor's Cup (Texas)

== Notes ==
Preceded by Houston Oilers; 1961 AFL Champions	Dallas Texans; American Football League Champions; 1962	Succeeded by San Diego Chargers; 1963 AFL Champions
