= Dobie Craig =

American football player (1938–2018)

No. 42, 89
- Positions: Wide receiver, halfback

Personal information
- Born: February 14, 1938; El Campo, Texas
- Died: May 22, 2018 (aged 80); El Campo, Texas
- Listed height: 6 ft 5 in (1.96 m)
- Listed weight: 200 lb (91 kg)

Career information
- High school: El Campo (TX)
- College: Baylor; Howard Payne

Career history
- Oakland Raiders (1962–1963); Houston Oilers (1964)
- Stats at Pro Football Reference

Dobie Craig (February 14, 1938 – May 22, 2018) was an American football wide receiver and halfback. He played for the Oakland Raiders from 1962 to 1963 and for the Houston Oilers in 1964.

He died on May 22, 2018, in El Campo, Texas at age 80.
