= Jack Spikes =

American football player (born 1937)

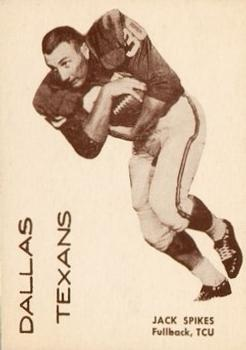

No. 30, 32
- Positions: Fullback, halfback, placekicker

Personal information
- Born: February 5, 1937 (age 89); Big Spring, Texas, U.S.
- Listed height: 6 ft 2 in (1.88 m)
- Listed weight: 210 lb (95 kg)

Career information
- High school: Snyder (Snyder, Texas)
- College: TCU
- NFL draft: 1960: 1st round, 6th overall pick
- AFL draft: 1960: 1st round

Career history
- Dallas Texans/Kansas City Chiefs (1960-1964); Houston Oilers (1965); Buffalo Bills (1966-1967)

Awards and highlights
- AFL champion (1962); AFL Championship MVP (1962); First-team All-American (1959); 2× First-team All-SWC (1958, 1959)

Career AFL statistics
- Rushing yards: 1,693
- Rushing average: 4.1
- Receptions: 56
- Receiving yards: 679
- Total touchdowns: 21
- Stats at Pro Football Reference

Jack Erwin Spikes (born February 5, 1937) is an American former professional football player who was a running back and placekicker in the American Football League (AFL). He played college football for the TCU Horned Frogs before playing for the AFL's Dallas Texans/Kansas City Chiefs, Houston Oilers, and the Buffalo Bills.

Spikes played a key role in professional football's longest championship game, the 1962 AFL Championship Game between the Texans and the Houston Oilers. Spikes' teammate Bill Hull intercepted the Oilers' George Blanda late in the first overtime. Hull's interception allowed the Texans to start the second overtime with two powerful runs by Spikes, to move the ball to the Oilers' 25-yard line, and Tommy Brooker kicked a field goal to give the Texans the win, 20–17.
