= Dick Dorsey =

American football player (born 1936)

No. 21
- Position: Wide receiver

Personal information
- Born: March 11, 1936 (age 90); Malvern, Iowa, U.S.
- Listed height: 6 ft 3 in (1.91 m)
- Listed weight: 200 lb (91 kg)

Career information
- High school: Santa Monica (CA)
- College: USC (1956); Oklahoma (1957)
- NFL draft: 1958: 19th round, 224th overall pick

Career history
- Oakland Raiders (1962)

Career AFL statistics
- Receptions: 21
- Receiving yards: 344
- Receiving touchdowns: 2
- Stats at Pro Football Reference

Richard LeRoy Dorsey (born March 11, 1936) is an American former professional football player who was a wide receiver for the Oakland Raiders of the American Football League (AFL) in 1962. He played college football for the Oklahoma Sooners and USC Trojans.
