= Chris Burford =

American football player (born 1938)

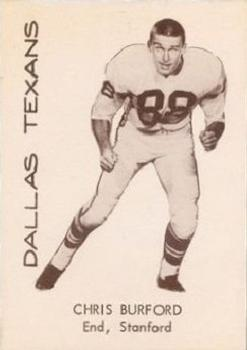
- Burford c. 1960

No. 88
- Position: Wide receiver

Personal information
- Born: January 31, 1938 (age 88); Oakland, California, U.S.
- Listed height: 6 ft 3 in (1.91 m)
- Listed weight: 220 lb (100 kg)

Career information
- High school: Oakland
- College: Stanford (1957–1959)
- NFL draft: 1960: 9th round, 105th overall pick
- AFL draft: 1960

Career history
- Dallas Texans / Kansas City Chiefs (1960–1967)

Awards and highlights
- 2× AFL champion (1962, 1966); First-team All-AFL (1962); AFL All-Star (1961); AFL receiving touchdowns leader (1962); Kansas City Chiefs Hall of Fame; First-team All-American (1959); Third-team All-American (1958); Pop Warner Trophy (1959); 2× First-team All-PCC (1958, 1959)

Career AFL statistics
- Receptions: 391
- Receiving yards: 5,505
- Receiving touchdowns: 55
- Stats at Pro Football Reference
- College Football Hall of Fame

Christopher William Burford III (born January 31, 1938) is an American former professional football player who was a wide receiver in the American Football League (AFL). He played college football for the Stanford Indians, serving as their team captain and leading the NCAA in receptions with 61 in 1959. The following year, he was selected in the first round of the 1960 AFL draft by the Dallas Texans.

== Professional career ==
In 1960, Burford caught 46 passes in his rookie season for the Texans, which went for 789 yards and five touchdowns. One of his touchdowns, which occurred in the Texans' first game, holds the distinction of being not only the first touchdown in franchise history, but the first points scored of any kind in franchise history. It was a 21-yard touchdown pass from quarterback Cotton Davidson. In 1961, he improved, catching 51 passes for 850 yards with five touchdowns to garner All-Star honors. In the 1962 season, he played in just 11 games and missed out on the AFL title run when he suffered a severe knee injury, but he caught 45 passes for 645 yards for a league-high 12 touchdowns to garner All-AFL honors. In 1963, he caught a career-high 68 passes for 824 yards for nine touchdowns. In each of those seasons, he led the team in receptions. He followed it up with 51 catches for 675 yards and seven touchdowns in 1964, although he played in only 12 games. 1965 meant just 11 games played, but he caught 47 passes for 575 yards and six touchdowns. He led the team in receptions for the fourth and last time.

In his penultimate year, Burford played every game and caught 58 passes for 758 yards for eight touchdowns as the Chiefs broke through for the postseason run. He made his only appearances in the playoffs during the AFL Championship Game and the first Super Bowl, making four receptions in each game. Burford played in nine games to close out his career in 1967. He made 25 catches for 389 yards and three touchdowns. In his last game against the New York Jets, he closed it out with two catches for 17 yards with a touchdown catch from Len Dawson. At the age of 29, he retired. By the end of his career, he was the Chiefs all-time reception leader (391) with 5,505 yards and 55 touchdowns.

For most of his AFL career, Burford was in the top ten in receiving catches, yards, and touchdowns. He was inducted into the Chiefs Hall of Fame in 1975 and in 2010 he was inducted into the African-American Ethnic Sports Hall of Fame. Burford, who is white, was nominated by his former black teammate Abner Haynes.

== AFL career statistics ==
Legend
	Won the AFL championship
	Led the league
**Bold**	Career high

Year	Team	Games		Receiving				
Year	Team	GP	GS	Rec	Yds	Avg	Lng	TD
1960	DAL	14	14	46	789	**17.2**	50	5
1961	DAL	14	14	51	**850**	16.7	54	5
1962	DAL	11	10	45	645	14.3	49	**12**
1963	KC	14	13	68	824	12.1	**69**	9
1964	KC	12	12	51	675	13.2	55	7
1965	KC	11	11	47	575	12.2	57	6
1966	KC	14	14	**58**	758	13.1	38	8
1967	KC	13	12	25	389	15.6	55	3
Career		103	100	391	5,505	14.1	69	55
