= 1960 Dallas Texans season =

NFL team season (inaugural)

- Owner: Lamar Hunt
- General manager: Don Rossi (resigned Nov. 1); Jack Steadman
- Head coach: Hank Stram
- Home stadium: Cotton Bowl

Results
- Record: 8–6
- Division place: 2nd AFL Western
- Playoffs: Did not qualify
- AFL All-Stars: No All-Star game

The 1960 Dallas Texans season was the inaugural season of the American Football League and the Texans, who would later be renamed the Kansas City Chiefs. They were coached by Hank Stram and played their games at the Cotton Bowl. The Texans finished the season with a 8–6 record and were in second place in the AFL's Western Conference.

The Texans conducted their inaugural training camp at the New Mexico Military Institute in Roswell, New Mexico.

The Texans' quarterback was Cotton Davidson. Running back Abner Haynes led the league with 875 rushing yards and nine touchdowns, as well as combined net yards (2,100) and punt return average (15.4).

The Texans would earn their first win in franchise history in week 2 over the Oakland Raiders, who would eventually become the team's biggest rival.

== 1960 AFL draft ==
In the inaugural American Football League draft, the Texans chose the following players to fill-up their squad:

- Jack Atcheson, E, Western Illinois
- George Boone, T, Kentucky
- Chris Burford, E, Stanford
- Earl Ray Butler, T, North Carolina
- Gail Cogdill, E, Washington State
- James Crotty, HB, Notre Dame
- Gary Ferguson, T, SMU
- Tom Glynn, C, Boston College
- Gene Gossage, T, Northwestern
- Jim Heineke, T, Wisconsin
- William Jerry, G/T, South Carolina
- John Kapele, T, BYU
- Louis Kelley, FB, New Mexico State
- Gilmer Lewis, T/G, Oklahoma
- John Malmberg, T/G, Knox College
- Arvle Martin, C, TCU
- Don Meredith, QB, SMU
- Tom Moore, HB, Vanderbilt
- Ola Murchison, E, COP
- Bob Nelson, C, Wisconsin
- Jim Norton, E, Idaho
- Warren Rabb, QB, LSU
- Howard Ringwood, HB, BYU
- Johnny Robinson, HB, LSU
- John Saunders, FB, South Carolina
- Glenn Shaw, FB, Kentucky
- Gordon Speer, HB, Rice
- Jack Stone, G, Oregon
- Marvin Terrell, G, Mississippi
- Emery Turner, G, Purdue
- Joe Vader, E, Kansas State
- Carroll Zaruba, HB, Nebraska
- Grady Alderman, G/T, Detroit
- Herman Alexander, T/G, Findlay (OH)
- Taz Anderson, HB, Georgia Tech
- Jim Beaver, T/G, Florida
- Bill Beck, T/G, Gustavus Adolphus
- Gary Campbell, HB, Whittier
- Vernon Cole, QB, North Texas State
- Toby Deese, T/G, Georgia Tech
- Carl Dumbald, T/G, West Virginia
- Charles Elizey, C, Mississippi State
- Tom Gates, HB, San Bernardino
- Austin (Goose) Gonsoulin, HB, Baylor
- Clark Holden, HB, USC
- Dewitt Hoopes, T/G, Northwestern
- Don Leebern, T/G, Georgia
- Bill Thompson, C, Georgia
- Billy Tranum, E, Arkansas
- Jim Vickers, E, Georgia
- Larry Ward, E, Lamar Tech
- Paul Winslow, HB, North Carolina College
- Doug Pat Brown, T/G, Fresno State

== Personnel ==
=== Roster ===
1960 Dallas Texans roster
Quarterbacks: 19 Cotton Davidson P/K; 14 Hunter Enis; Running Backs: 32 Bo Dickinson; 28 Abner Haynes; 30 Jack Spikes K; Wide Receivers / Flankers: 85 Ed Bernet; 88 Chris Burford; 33 Curley Johnson; 42 Johnny Robinson; Tight Ends: 80 Max Boydston	Offensive Linemen: 50 Jim Barton C; 74 Jerry Cornelison T; 79 Charley Diamond T/G; 55 Tom Dimmick C; 62 Sid Fournet G; 64 Bill Krisher G; 60 Al Reynolds G; 76 Jack Stone T; 63 Marvin Terrell G; Defensive Linemen: 87 Mel Branch DE; 71 Ray Collins DT; 66 Dick Frey DE; 86 Paul Miller DE; 76 Walter Napier DT; 72 Paul Rochester DT	Linebackers: 56 Walt Corey OLB; 54 Ted Greene MLB/OLB; 69 Sherrill Headrick MLB; 35 Smokey Stover OLB; Defensive Backs: 22 Johnny Bookman SS; 36 Clem Daniels CB; 18 Don Flynn CB; 44 Jimmy Harris CB; 21 Dave Webster FS; 48 Duane Wood CB	Reserve: 89 Bob Bryant TE (IR); 68 R. B. Nunnery T (IR); Rookies in italics

== Preseason ==
The Texans completed an undefeated inaugural preseason with a record of 6-0, playing in six different cities, with only the final preseason game being played at their home stadium, the Cotton Bowl in Dallas.

=== Schedule ===
Week	Date	Opponent	Result	Record	Venue	Attendance
1	July 31	at Oakland Raiders	W 20–13	1-0	Kezar Stadium	12,000
2	August 6	at Houston Oilers	W 27–10	2–0	Skelly Field (Tulsa, OK)	10,000
3	August 14	at Boston Patriots	W 24–14	3–0	Harvard Stadium	11,000
4	August 20	New York Titans	W 38–14	4–0	Shotwell Stadium (Abilene, TX)	7,000
5	August 27	Denver Broncos	W 48–0	5–0	War Memorial Stadium (Little Rock, AR)	Not reported
6	September 2	Houston Oilers	W 24–3	6–0	Cotton Bowl	51,000

== Regular season ==
The Texans finished their inaugural season 8–6, with three wins coming by shutout.

=== Schedule ===
Week	Date	Opponent	Result	Record	Venue	Attendance	Recap
1	September 10	at **Los Angeles Chargers**	**L** 20–21	0–1	Los Angeles Memorial Coliseum	17,724	Recap
2	September 16	at **Oakland Raiders**	**W** 34–16	1–1	Kezar Stadium	8,021	Recap
3	September 25	**Los Angeles Chargers**	**W** 17–0	2–1	Cotton Bowl	42,000	Recap
4	October 2	New York Titans	**L** 35–37	2–2	Cotton Bowl	37,500	Recap
5	October 9	**Oakland Raiders**	**L** 19–20	2–3	Cotton Bowl	21,000	Recap
6	October 16	at Houston Oilers	**L** 10–20	2–4	Jeppesen Stadium	19,026	Recap
7	Bye						
8	October 30	at **Denver Broncos**	**W** 17–14	3–4	Bears Stadium	13,102	Recap
9	November 6	at Buffalo Bills	**W** 45–28	4–4	War Memorial Stadium	19,610	Recap
10	November 13	**Denver Broncos**	**W** 34–7	5–4	Cotton Bowl	21,000	Recap
11	November 18	at Boston Patriots	**L** 14–42	5–5	Boston University Field	14,721	Recap
12	November 24	at New York Titans	**L** 35–41	5–6	Polo Grounds	14,344	Recap
13	December 4	Houston Oilers	**W** 24–0	6–6	Cotton Bowl	20,000	Recap
14	December 11	Boston Patriots	**W** 34–0	7–6	Cotton Bowl	12,000	Recap
15	December 18	Buffalo Bills	**W** 24–7	8–6	Cotton Bowl	18,000	Recap
Note: Intra-division opponents are in **bold** text.

== Standings ==
AFL Western Division
	W	L	T	PCT	DIV	PF	PA	STK
Los Angeles Chargers	10	4	0	.714	5–1	373	336	W4
Dallas Texans	8	6	0	.571	4–2	362	253	W3
Oakland Raiders	6	8	0	.429	2–4	319	388	W1
Denver Broncos	4	9	1	.308	1–5	309	393	L3

Note: Tie games were not officially counted in the standings in the AFL.
