= History of the Kansas City Chiefs =

Sports team history

The Kansas City Chiefs are a professional American football franchise that began play in 1960 as the Dallas Texans. The team was a charter member of the American Football League (AFL), and now play in the National Football League (NFL). The team is not related to the earlier Dallas Texans NFL team that played for only one season in 1952.

The Texans won the 1962 AFL Championship and relocated to Kansas City, Missouri the following year, becoming the Chiefs. In 1966, the Chiefs won their second AFL title and appeared in the first AFL-NFL World Championship game (later named Super Bowl I) in January 1967, losing to the Green Bay Packers. In 1969, the Chiefs won the final AFL title and went on to defeat the NFL's heavily favored Minnesota Vikings in Super Bowl IV. The Texans/Chiefs were the most victorious franchise in AFL history, compiling an 87–48–5 record from 1960 to 1969.

Fifty years later, the Chiefs won Super Bowl LIV in February 2020 with quarterback Patrick Mahomes, who was named MVP. In Super Bowl LVII in 2023, the Chiefs won again and Mahomes won his second Super Bowl MVP award. They won yet again in Super Bowl LVIII in 2024.

== AFL origins ==
In 1959, Lamar Hunt, son of oil tycoon H. L. Hunt, began discussions with other businessmen about establishing an American football organization that would rival that of the National Football League. As early as 1958, Hunt had the interest of purchasing an NFL franchise and moving it to Dallas, Texas. His desire to secure a professional football franchise was further heightened after watching the historic 1958 NFL Championship Game between the Baltimore Colts and the New York Giants. The team that Hunt was most interested in buying was the Chicago Cardinals.

The NFL convinced Hunt to contact Cardinals owner Violet Bidwill Wolfner, and her husband Walter Wolfner eventually agreed to sell Hunt 20 percent of the Cardinals franchise. Hunt declined the opportunity. He then conceived the concept of forming a second league. "Why wouldn't a second league work", Hunt recalled. "There was an American and National League in baseball, why not football?" Hunt contacted several other individuals who had expressed interest in the Cardinals franchise—Bud Adams, Bob Howsam, Max Winter and Bill Boyer—and gauged their interest in forming a second league.

On August 14, the first meeting of the new league was held in Chicago. Charter memberships were issued to six original cities — Dallas, New York, Houston, Denver, Los Angeles and Minneapolis. The league was officially christened the American Football League on August 22. Ralph Wilson was extended the league's seventh franchise for Buffalo, New York, on October 28 and Billy Sullivan became the league's eighth team's owner for Boston on November 22. Minneapolis withdrew its franchise from the AFL in November after receiving an offer for a team in the NFL, and Oakland, California instead joined the AFL as the Oakland Raiders.

=== Early years in Dallas ===
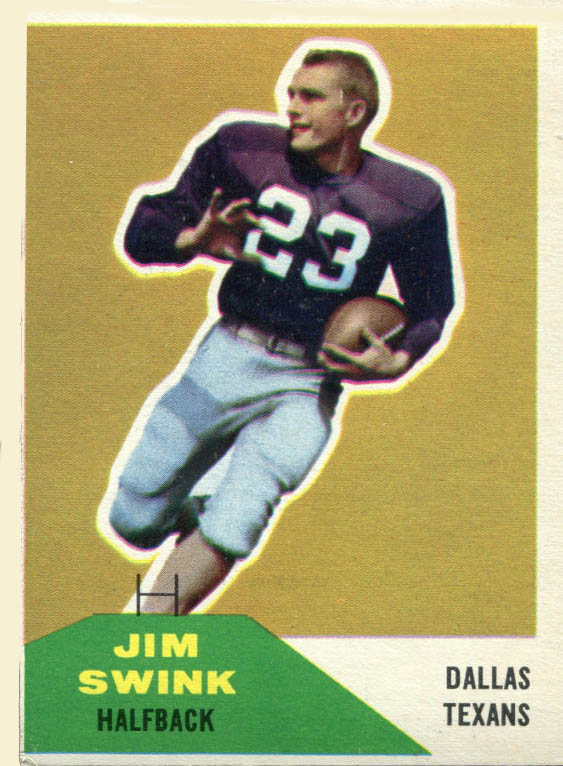
Jim Swink on a Fleer football card of 1960

For the Texans' inaugural season, team owner Lamar Hunt pursued both legendary University of Oklahoma coach Bud Wilkinson and New York Giants defensive assistant Tom Landry to lead his Texans franchise. Wilkinson opted to stay at Oklahoma, while Landry was destined to coach the NFL's franchise in Dallas, to be called the Cowboys. In mid-December 1959 Hunt settled on a relatively unknown assistant coach from the University of Miami, Hank Stram. "One of the biggest reasons I hired Hank was that he really wanted the job", Hunt explained. "It turned out to be a very lucky selection on my part."

The Texans have Don Klosterman as their head talent man. Klosterman had a penchant for luring star talent away from the NFL, and for finding talent otherwise undiscovered.

Reserved seats at the Cotton Bowl cost USD $4, general admission $2 and high school students paid 90¢ (90 cents) that initial season. Don Rossi served as the team's General Manager until November when he was succeeded by Jack Steadman. The team was headquartered in the Mercantile National Bank Building. The AFL was also headquartered in Dallas.

The Texans conducted their inaugural training camp at the New Mexico Military Institute in Roswell, New Mexico. The club embarked on a whirlwind pre-season barnstorming tour that featured road games in Oakland, Tulsa, Boston, Abilene and Little Rock. An announced crowd of 51,000 at the Cotton Bowl witnessed a 24–3 victory against Houston on September 2 as the club concluded a perfect 6–0 preseason record.

In both teams' inaugural 1960 seasons, the Dallas Texans and Dallas Cowboys competed fiercely for the attention of local football fans. For example, according to the book Ten-Gallon War, the Texans offered discounted tickets at department stores and airline offices, free tickets for fill-ups at certain service stations, and even had free tickets "stuffed inside helium-filled balloons set loose over the city." They held a promotion where fans in barber's capes got discounted tickets (under the theory that local barbers were some of the most trusted people in the city) and gave free admission to fans who showed ticket stubs from local high school games played on certain weeks. In competition, the Dallas Cowboys had such promotions as hiring Roy Rogers and Dale Evans for a halftime show.

In their early years, the Texans had a strong home-state identity with quarterback Cotton Davidson from Baylor, linebacker Sherrill Headrick from TCU and running back Abner Haynes from North Texas. Haynes led the league with 875 rushing yards and nine TDs, as well as combined net yards (2,100) and punt return average (15.4). The Texans also had a flashy, high-scoring club which finished the year at 8–6 as three close losses kept the squad from challenging for the division title. The Texans averaged 24,500 for their home games, the highest average in the league. In one attempt to draw more fans to their games, the Texans would offer free tickets to anyone who brought a ticket stub from the previous Friday's high school football game, to counter the NFL Cowboys' playing their home games on Friday night.

In 1961, the Texans and the NFL's Dallas Cowboys both drafted linebacker E.J. Holub from Texas Tech, described by many scouts as "the best football player in America." Holub decided to play for the Texans, joining three future franchise Hall of Famers—Jerry Mays, Fred Arbanas and Jim Tyrer—as part of the club's draft class. The club moved its training camp to Lamar Hunt's alma mater of Southern Methodist University and started the regular season at 3–1 before hitting a six-game losing skid, the longest such streak of Stram's tenure with the franchise. The Texans rebounded to claim wins in three of its final four contests to finish 6–8, marking the club's second straight finish behind the San Diego Chargers in the AFL Western Conference standings.

In 1962, head coach Hank Stram was named AFL Coach of the Year and running back Curtis McClinton was named the AFL Rookie of the Year. Haynes became the franchise's first 1,000-yard rusher, concluding the season with 1,049 yards and an AFL-high 13 rushing touchdowns.

The Texans clinched their initial AFL Western Division Championship in November and finished with an 11–3 regular season record. The team won the 1962 AFL Championship when kicker Tommy Brooker connected on a 25-yard field goal during the second overtime of the title game, giving the Texans a 20–17 victory against the Houston Oilers. Spanning an elapsed time of 77:54, the game stands as the third-longest contest in pro football history. Until a Christmas Day playoff game in 1971 between the Chiefs and Dolphins, the game was the longest ever played.

=== The move to Kansas City ===
Following the 1962 season, the team relocated to Kansas City, where they were renamed the Chiefs.

The Dallas Cowboys joined the NFL as an expansion team in 1960. By the end of the 1962 season, it was apparent that Dallas could not support two teams. Even though the Texans had been far more successful on the field, Hunt investigated opportunities to move his team elsewhere for the 1963 season, including Miami, Atlanta, Seattle and New Orleans. Hunt wanted to find a city to which he could commute easily from Dallas, and when he was unable to secure Tulane Stadium because the university didn't want its football program to compete with a pro team, he turned to Kansas City, Missouri, where Mayor H. Roe Bartle persuaded him to move to the Midwest.

The negotiations in Kansas City were conducted in secrecy. On several occasions Hunt and Jack Steadman were in Kansas City and met with businessmen, without the general public's knowledge. Bartle introduced Hunt as "Mr. Lamar" in all the meetings with other Kansas City businessmen. Steadman was introduced as "Jack X."

The support the team received from the Kansas City community before the team announced the move was extraordinary. Hunt made the move dependent upon the ability of Mayor Bartle and the Kansas City community to guarantee him 35,000 in season ticket sales. Hunt had set this number, being that it was the Texans' average attendance at the Cotton Bowl in Dallas. An ambitious campaign took shape to deliver on Bartle's guarantee to Hunt of tripling the season-ticket base the Texans had enjoyed in Dallas. Kansas City's mayor also promised to add 3,000 permanent seats to Municipal Stadium, as well as 11,000 temporary bleacher seats. Along with Bartle, a number of other prominent Kansas Citians stepped forward to aid in the efforts, putting together more than 1,000 workers to sell season tickets.

Bartle called to his office 20 business leaders and called upon them to form an association later known as "The Gold Coats", whose sole objective was to sell and take down payments on the 35,000 season tickets required. "The Gold Coats" had to sell season tickets to people without knowing the team name, where it was coming from, who the owner was, which football league they would play in, who the players or coaches were, when the team would play its first game in Kansas City, or where it would play. Hunt gave Bartle a four-month deadline to accomplish the sales. Bartle and "The Gold Coats" made good in only 8 weeks. Later, Hunt admitted he was really only hoping for 20,000, for which he still would have moved the franchise. On May 22, Hunt announced he was moving the franchise to Kansas City, Missouri.

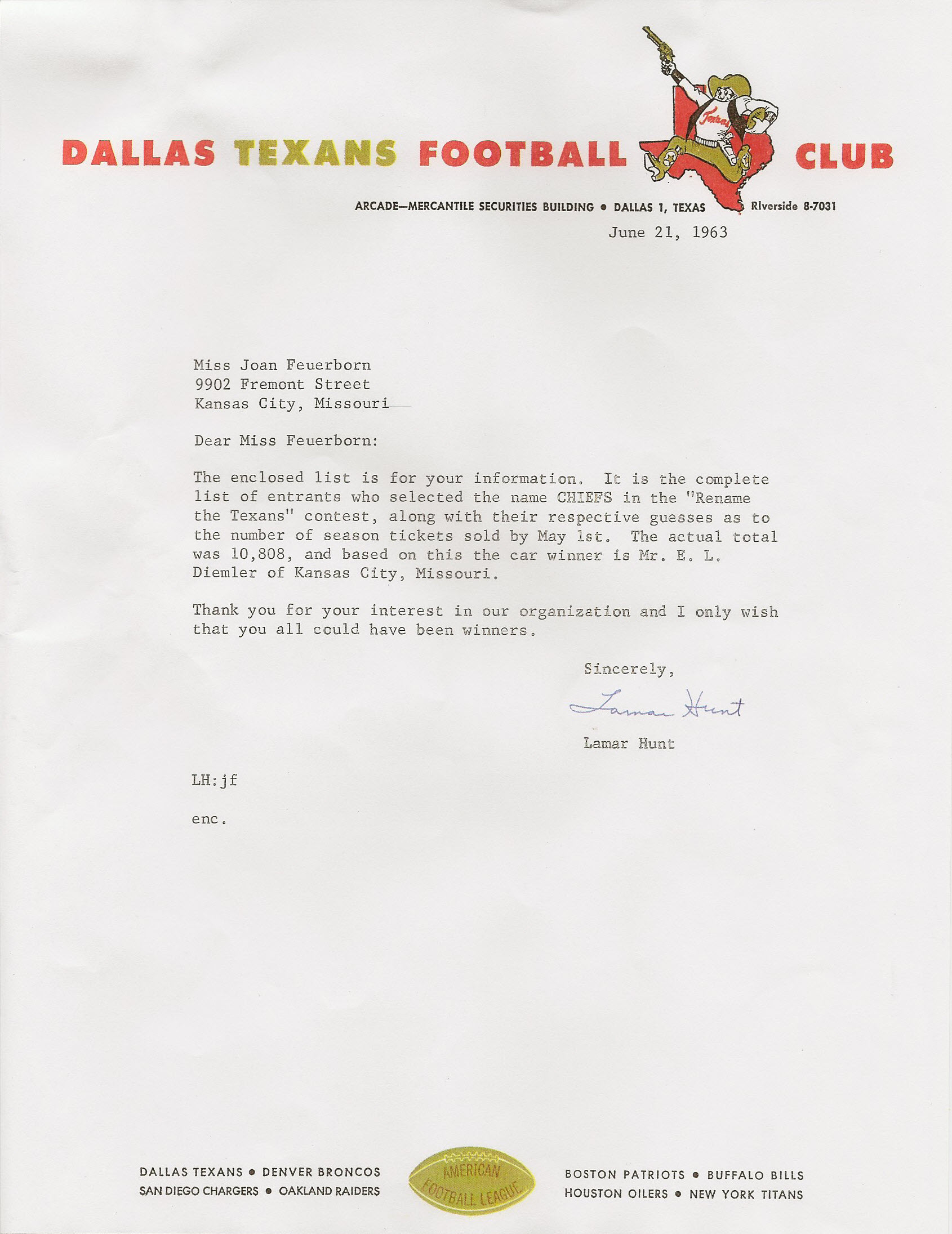
Football Club Naming Contest Letter from Lamar Hunt

Hunt, with a roster replete with players who had played college football in Texas, wanted to maintain a lineage to the team's roots and wanted to name the club the Kansas City Texans. "The Lakers stayed the Lakers when they moved from Minnesota to California", he reasoned. "But Jack Steadman convinced me that wasn't too smart. It wouldn't sell." The team was renamed the Kansas City Chiefs—one of the most popular suggestions Hunt received in a name-the-team contest. Lamar Hunt sent letters dated June 21, 1963, to all the contest entrants who selected the name CHIEFS in the "Rename the Texans" contest of whom Mrs. Joan Feuerborn was one of those entrants, and along with their respective guesses as to the number of season tickets sold by May 1. The actual total was 10,808, and based on this the car winner was Mr. E. L. Diemler of Kansas City, Missouri, a warehouse manager who got the idea when making out a bill of lading to Chief Freight Lines. Another name also considered at the time for the team was the Kansas City Mules.

The name, "Chiefs" is not only derived from a fan contest, but also from Mayor Bartle, who 35 years prior, founded the Native American-based honor society known as The Tribe of Mic-O-Say within the Boy Scouts of America organization, which earned him the nickname, "The Chief."

The Chiefs moved into Municipal Stadium, located at 22nd and Brooklyn, which opened in 1923 and had 49,002 seats. The Chiefs shared the facilities with the Kansas City Athletics of Major League Baseball. The first appearance of the Chiefs in Municipal Stadium attracted just 5,721 fans for a 17–13 pre-season victory against Buffalo on August 9.

The Chiefs' inaugural season in Kansas City began with owner Lamar Hunt's trade of starting quarterback Cotton Davidson to the Oakland Raiders, which landed the number one overall selection in the AFL draft (which they used to select Buck Buchanan). Ironically, the Raiders would later select Gene Upshaw in 1967 for the express purpose of blocking Buchanan. The Chiefs also selected guard Ed Budde from Michigan State with their other first round pick, and Bobby Bell from Minnesota in the seventh round. Buchanan, Budde and Bell all became starters on their way to a combined 526 games with the team and all three of them played their entire careers with the Chiefs.

Tragedy struck the club when rookie running back Stone Johnson, who was a sprinter in the 1960 Summer Olympics in Rome, suffered a fractured vertebra in his neck in a pre-season game against Oakland on August 30 in Wichita, Kansas. He died 10 days later on September 8 and his jersey number 33 was subsequently retired. The Chiefs finished their first season in Kansas City with a 5–7–2 record and failed to reappear in the AFL Championship game for a consecutive year.

=== Building a champion, 1964–1969 ===
In 1964, the Chiefs began the year with a 2–1 mark before dropping three consecutive games as several of the team's best players, including E.J. Holub, Fred Arbanas and Johnny Robinson missed numerous games with injuries. Arbanas missed the final two games of the year after undergoing surgery to his left eye, in which he suffered almost total loss of vision. Running back Mack Lee Hill, who signed with the club as a rookie free agent and received a mere $300 signing bonus, entered the starting lineup and earned a spot in the AFL All-Star Game. The club rounded out the season with two consecutive wins to close the season at 7–7, finishing second in the AFL Western Conference behind the San Diego Chargers. An average of just 18,126 fans attended each home game at Municipal Stadium, prompting discussion at the AFL owners' meeting about the Chiefs future in Kansas City.

For the 1965 season, the Chiefs were once again caught in the middle of the AFL and NFL's bidding wars for college talent. Kansas City made running back Gale Sayers from the University of Kansas their first-round draft pick, but Sayers eventually signed with the Bears for less money. Running back Mack Lee Hill suffered torn ligaments in his right knee in the second to last regular season game of the year at Buffalo on December 12. Following what was expected to be a routine surgery on December 14 at Menorah Hospital in Kansas City, Hill died from what was termed "a sudden and massive embolism." Hunt called Hill's death "the worst shock possible." Beginning the following year, the club annually bestowed the Mack Lee Hill Award on its top rookie or first-year performer in Hill's honor. Just days after Hill's unexpected death, the mourning Chiefs defeated the Denver Broncos on December 19 to finish the year with a 7–5–2 record, their first winning season in Kansas City.

In 1966, the Chiefs were beginning to lay the groundwork for a return to the AFL Championship game and eventual dominance in the later years of the AFL. Team owner Lamar Hunt was publicly negotiating with NFL Commissioner Pete Rozelle about a possible merger of the two leagues. Defensive end Aaron Brown was highly coveted by many clubs, including the NFL's Steelers, who intended to select him. The Steelers couldn't locate Brown on draft day since he was already aboard a flight with Chiefs owner Lamar Hunt, who carried out the first mid-air signing in team history. The Chiefs signed Heisman Trophy-winning running back Mike Garrett in the 20th round of the 1966 AFL draft. Garrett went on to earn AFL Rookie of the Year honors for the 1966 season.

The Chiefs started the season at 3–0. A crowd of 43,885 attended the Chiefs home opener against the defending AFL Champion Buffalo Bills on October 2, the largest ever to witness a sports event in Kansas City at the time. The Chiefs dropped a 29–14 decision to the Bills, but after the contest, Chiefs coach Hank Stram and Buffalo head coach Joe Collier negotiated a trade in the middle of the field. Kansas City received placekicker Mike Mercer for a fifth-round pick. Chiefs quarterback Len Dawson led the league in passing, while Otis Taylor became the first 1,000-yard receiver in franchise history, registering 1,297 yards. The Chiefs finished three games in front of Oakland to claim an AFL Western Conference title with an 11–2–1 record, setting the stage for the franchise's second trip to the AFL Championship Game.

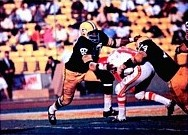
The Chiefs and the Packers in the first AFL–NFL Championship Game (Super Bowl I)

Using a dazzling I-formation offense and a smothering defense, the Chiefs claimed a dominating 31–7 victory in the AFL title game at Buffalo on New Year's Day, 1967. That victory propelled Kansas City to the first AFL-NFL World Championship Game, later known as the Super Bowl. At the Los Angeles Memorial Coliseum, the Chiefs met Vince Lombardi's powerful Green Bay Packers of the National Football League on January 15, 1967. The Chiefs played the Packers close for a half, trailing 14–10, but Green Bay took control in the final two quarters, winning the game by a score of 35–10.

For 1967, the club's special teams got a boost with the addition of kicker Jan Stenerud, and kick returner Noland "Super Gnat" Smith. The Chiefs' first regular season game against an NFL team resulted in a commanding 66–24 Chiefs victory against the Chicago Bears at Municipal Stadium on August 23. Injuries again hit the club hard during the regular season as the Chiefs clawed their way to a 9–5 record.

Interest in the team skyrocketed following the team's appearance in the AFL-NFL Championship Game, forcing an increase in seating capacity at Municipal Stadium from 40,000 to 47,000. In June, Jackson County voters approved a $43 million bond issue for construction of a sports complex to be completed by 1972. Eastern Jackson County was chosen as the site of the Chiefs and Royals' new stadiums, and groundbreaking ceremonies took place in July with plans calling for a unique "rolling roof" design (which was later scrapped).

The 1968 Chiefs defense allowed a franchise-low 170 points (12.1 ppg). The nucleus of the defensive unit was in its prime, producing six AFL All-Stars, including all three of the squad's linebackers. Offensively, quarterback Len Dawson led the AFL in passing for the fourth time. The Chiefs began the season with a 7–1 record and rattled off five straight victories to close the regular season at 12–2, sharing the AFL Western Conference title with the Oakland Raiders and setting up a one-game playoff between the two teams. Kansas City lost a 41–6 decision at Oakland on December 22 as the Raiders advanced to the 1968 AFL Championship Game against the New York Jets. The loss to Oakland is considered to be the beginning of the Chiefs' rivalry with the Raiders, one of the NFL's most bitter feuds.

The Chiefs used the momentum they built during the 1968 campaign by posting a perfect 6–0 record during pre-season play for 1969. The team began the regular season with four consecutive road games for the only time in team history. After a decisive 27–9 win at San Diego on September 14, the club posted a 31–0 shutout at Boston on September 21. During the game, quarterback Len Dawson sustained a knee injury which would sideline him for the following two months.

The once-optimistic picture for the Chiefs went from bad to worse the following week when back-up quarterback Jacky Lee went down with a broken ankle in a 24–19 loss at Cincinnati on September 28. That injury left the team's most crucial position in the hands of second-year quarterback Mike Livingston, who took just five snaps as a rookie in 1968. However, Livingston engineered a five-game winning streak, while getting plenty of help from the club's defense. The team's home opener was played in a day-long deluge referred to as a "frog-strangler" by Chiefs radio broadcaster Bill Grigsby. The Chiefs and Houston Oilers combined for 14 fumbles in a 24–0 Kansas City victory on October 12. Len Dawson returned to the starting lineup in a 27–3 win against San Diego on November 9 and guided the club to three wins in the season's next four games.

The Chiefs defeated the Denver Broncos 31–17 on Thanksgiving Day. Trailing 24–17 late in the game, Denver attempted an onside kick that was recovered by linebacker Bobby Bell, who promptly returned that kick for a 53-yard touchdown. Mike Livingston started the following week against Buffalo on December 7 for an again-injured Dawson, who returned for the regular season finale at Oakland on December 13. A 10–6 loss against the Raiders gave the Chiefs an 11–3 record, good for second in the AFC Western Conference behind Oakland (12–1–1).

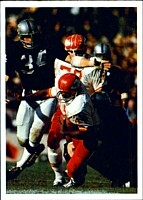
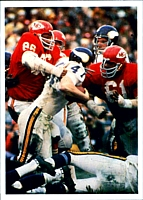
The Chiefs topped the Raiders in the 1969 AFL championship game (left) and went on to defeat the Vikings in Super Bowl IV (right).

In an AFL Divisional Playoff Game at New York, Kansas City rode its dominating defense which produced a crucial goal-line stand en route to a 13–6 win over the defending Super Bowl champion Jets to set up a rematch with the Raiders in the final AFL Championship Game. Looking for retribution of the previous losses in the regular season and in the 1968 playoffs, the Chiefs became the league's only three-time champions, defeating the Raiders by a 17–7 count at Oakland on January 4, 1970.

During the days preceding Kansas City's clash with the heavily favored Minnesota Vikings of the NFL, unsubstantiated media reports associating Len Dawson with a known gambler hounded the Chiefs quarterback. Dawson was later revealed to be mistaken for another man with the same last name. The night before Super Bowl IV, Ed Sabol of NFL Films approached Vikings coach Bud Grant about being wired for sound for the game. Grant declined, but Chiefs coach Hank Stram accepted. As both the Chiefs and the cameras rolled, Stram clamored for his team to run "65 toss power trap" and to "keep matriculating the ball down the field." Stram became the first-ever coach to be wired for NFL Films, and ironically, as a coach in the rival AFL.

The Chiefs used the game as a crusade for the American Football League and wore "AFL-10" patches honoring the league's 10-year existence. The Chiefs used three field goals from Jan Stenerud and a rushing touchdown from Mike Garrett to take a 16–0 halftime lead. A dynamic 46-yard TD pass from Len Dawson to Otis Taylor in the third quarter sealed the victory as Dawson was named the game's Most Valuable Player. Perhaps the grittiest performance of the day came from safety Johnny Robinson, who registered two interceptions and a fumble recovery despite playing with three broken ribs. At approximately 5:20 PM, the final seconds ticked off the clock at Tulane Stadium as the Chiefs were crowned World Champions by claiming a 23–7 victory in the final game between the AFL and NFL. A victory parade ensued upon the club's triumphant return the following day in downtown Kansas City. Super Bowl IV was the last championship won by the Chiefs until Super Bowl LIV,

== Alignment to the NFL ==
=== Fall from glory, 1970–1977 ===
Following their championship win, the NFL-AFL merger placed the Chiefs in the newly created AFC West division with the Chargers, Raiders, and Broncos. The team traded running back Mike Garrett to San Diego in 1970 and replaced him in the lineup with Ed Podolak. Despite a 44–24 win against Baltimore on September 28 in just the second-ever telecast of ABC's Monday Night Football package, the Chiefs owned a 3–3–1 record at the season's midpoint. The Chiefs and the Raiders tied a game at 17–17 on November 1 following a controversial play from Oakland. The Chiefs were ahead 17–14 when Len Dawson apparently sealed the win, running for a first down which would have allowed Kansas City to run out the clock. While on the ground, Dawson was speared by Raiders defensive end Ben Davidson in an infamous incident that cost the Chiefs a victory and further inflamed the already heated Chiefs-Raiders rivalry. Wide receiver Otis Taylor retaliated and a bench-clearing brawl ensued. Offsetting penalties were called, nullifying Dawson's first down. The Chiefs were forced to punt and Raiders kicker George Blanda booted a game-tying field goal with eight seconds remaining. That tie ultimately cost the Chiefs the opportunity to split the AFC West division title with Oakland as Kansas City finished the year with a 7–5–2 record, while the Raiders went 8–4–2 and reached the conference championship.

I always thought that our best team was the peak of our best team, our '71 squad.

— Lamar Hunt

In 1971, the Chiefs were regarded by many as the finest squad ever assembled by the franchise, including team owner Lamar Hunt. The team featured a franchise record 11 Pro Bowlers. Offensively, wide receiver Otis Taylor led the league with 1,110 receiving yards. In just his third pro season, Ed Podolak surpassed Abner Haynes as the all-time leading rusher in team history. The longstanding linebacking trio of Willie Lanier, Bobby Bell and Jim Lynch was the league's best. The offensive line was headlined by guard Ed Budde and tackle Jim Tyrer, while the defensive front featured a pair of Pro Bowlers in tackles Buck Buchanan and Curley Culp. Both placekicker Jan Stenerud and punter Jerrel Wilson represented the squad in the Pro Bowl, as well.

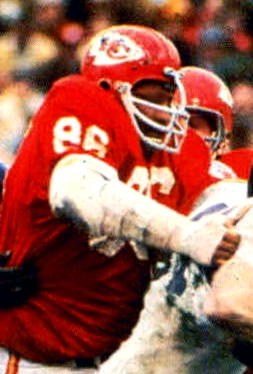
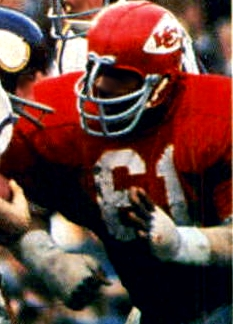
The Chiefs defensive tackles Buck Buchanan (left) and Curley Culp (right) were integral parts of the team's remarkable defensive line in the late 1960s and early 1970s.

After bolting to a 5–1–1 start, the club went 5–2 during the second half of the season to finish the year at 10–3–1. A 16–14 victory against Oakland on December 12 gave the franchise its initial AFC West title. The great promise of the 1971 campaign ended dramatically in the longest game in NFL history, an AFC Divisional Playoff Game played on Christmas Day against the Miami Dolphins. It took 82:40 to finish the contest, but a 37-yard field goal from Dolphins kicker Garo Yepremian finally ended this epic as Miami claimed a 27–24 double overtime win in the final football contest played at Kansas City's Municipal Stadium. Chiefs' running back Ed Podolak accounted for 350 combined net yards, a figure that remains an NFL post-season record. The baton of power in the AFC was officially passed to the Dolphins, who went on to appear in three consecutive Super Bowls. It would be the Chiefs' last playoff appearance for 15 years, effectively signaling the conclusion of the franchise's glory days.

In 1972, the last original member of the 1960 Dallas Texans team departed when safety Johnny Robinson announced his retirement at training camp. Meanwhile, starting quarterback Len Dawson ended speculation about his retirement by signing a two-year contract. Franchise owner Lamar Hunt became the first AFL figure to be inducted into the Pro Football Hall of Fame on July 29.

After two different construction strikes and a myriad of other delays, Arrowhead Stadium was officially dedicated on August 12 when the Chiefs registered a 24–14 victory against the St. Louis Cardinals. Running back Ed Podolak scored the first touchdown in the facility. Regular season ticket prices for the team's first season at Arrowhead were USD$8 for box seats and $7 for reserved seating.

On September 17, the Chiefs lost a 20–10 decision against Miami in the first regular season game at Arrowhead in front of a crowd of 79,829. A standing-room-only crowd of 82,094 fans was in attendance for a 27–14 victory against Oakland on November 5, the largest "in-house" attendance total for an NFL contest in Arrowhead's history. After a 5–3 start, a three-game losing streak effectively eliminated the club from playoff contention, including an embarrassing home loss to the winless Philadelphia Eagles. An 8–6 record was good enough for only a second-place finish in the AFC West behind Oakland. Linebacker Willie Lanier became the first Chiefs player to receive the NFL Man of the Year Award in the offseason.

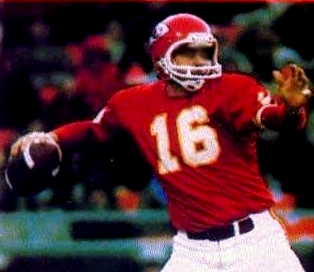
Dawson pictured later in his career with the Chiefs

For 1973, quarterback Mike Livingston started in a 23–13 Opening Day loss against Los Angeles, but Len Dawson returned to rally the club for three consecutive wins to get the club off to a 3–1 start for a third consecutive year. The aging Len Dawson made his final start of the year in a 23–14 loss at Buffalo on October 29 on Monday Night Football and was replaced for the remainder of the year by Livingston, beginning a string of three straight seasons in which both players split time at the position. Livingston led the club to another three straight wins, putting the team in first place in mid-November with a 6–3–1 record. A 1–2–1 ledger over the season's final month ended the club's post-season aspirations as the team finished the year in a second-place tie with Denver at 7–5–2. Len Dawson became the second Chiefs player in as many years to win the NFL Man of the Year Award. Following Super Bowl VIII, The AFC-NFC Pro Bowl was held at Arrowhead Stadium on January 20 with the AFC claiming a 15–13 win thanks to five field goals from Miami placekicker Garo Yepremian.

While the club's sparkling new facility at Arrowhead Stadium was drawing rave reviews, the Chiefs roster was beginning to show its age in 1974. The result was the team's first losing season in 11 years as the club was unable to string together consecutive victories during the year, a first in franchise history. Most of the team's starters were advancing in age: Len Dawson was 39, Jim Tyrer was 35, Bobby Bell, Buck Buchanan, and Ed Budde were 34, Dave Hill was 33 and Otis Taylor was 32.

One of the year's few bright spots in the 5–9 season was cornerback Emmitt Thomas, who led the league with a franchise-record 12 interceptions. The final game of the 1974 campaign marked the final time all five of Kansas City's future Hall of Fame players from the club's AFL championship era took the field together with coach Hank Stram. Including Lamar Hunt and five future Minnesota Vikings Hall of Famers, a total of 12 Hall of Fame inductees were involved in that 1974 season finale game. That 35–15 loss against Super Bowl-bound Minnesota provided an anticlimactic conclusion to Hank Stram's coaching career in Kansas City. Stram, the only head coach in franchise history was relieved of his duties on December 27 after compiling a 124–76–10 regular season record with the club.

San Francisco 49ers defensive coordinator Paul Wiggin was named the second head coach in franchise history on January 23, 1975. Wiggin inherited the unenviable task of rebuilding a squad whose pool of talent had been largely depleted due to age and a number of ill-considered trades that had left the club devoid of first-round draft choices in 1973 and 1975. After an 0–3 start to the season, Wiggin directed the Chiefs to three straight wins, beginning with a convincing 42–10 victory against the Raiders. The highlight of the season was a 34–31 upset win at Dallas on Monday Night Football. The club could not maintain the early success; owning a 5–5 record heading into the home stretch of the season, injuries to a number of key players crippled the team. The team dropped its final four contests of the year to finish at 5–9 for the second consecutive season. The regular season finale at Oakland marked the final games in the Hall of Fame careers of Len Dawson and Buck Buchanan.

By 1976, many of the Chiefs' championship players were on their way out of Kansas City. Buck Buchanan announced his retirement in February, while Dawson announced his own departure on May 1. Off the field, Jack Steadman was promoted to team president and Jim Schaaf was named general manager in August. On the field, Kansas City's fortunes didn't improve in the second year of the Wiggin regime. The club dropped three straight home games, including a 27–17 loss to a New Orleans Saints team coached by Stram, before suffering a 50–17 setback at Buffalo on October 3, opening the season at 0–4 for the first time in team history. The team registered a 3–1 record during a successful midseason stretch, but like most of the previous seasons, could not maintain that momentum.

After lingering in Len Dawson's shadow for eight seasons, Mike Livingston was firmly entrenched as the team's starting quarterback, becoming the first QB to start every regular season game since Dawson in 1968. Although Livingston played well and rallied the squad for wins in two of the season's final three games, the Chiefs still ended the year with their third consecutive 5–9 record. Running back MacArthur Lane was the club's top offensive threat, becoming the only player at the time in franchise history to lead the league in receptions (66).

On the field, the Chiefs suffered their worst season ever in 1977, winning just twice and undergoing a mid-season coaching change. Following three consecutive 5–9 seasons, the team finished with a league worst 2–12 record. An 0–5 start doomed the squad with a 44–7 loss at Cleveland, where Wiggin starred as a defensive lineman during the Browns' glory days, effectively sealing the coach's fate. Wiggin was relieved of his duties on Halloween, marking the only in-season coaching switch in team history. Defensive backs coach Tom Bettis was named interim coach and claimed a 20–10 victory against Green Bay in the club's initial contest under his direction, but it was the only victory of his brief head coaching tenure.

Bettis and the remainder of the coaching staff assembled by Wiggin were relieved on December 19, one day after a 21–20 loss at Oakland in the regular season finale. Marv Levy, the former head coach of the Canadian Football League's Montreal Alouettes, was named the fourth head coach in franchise history the following day. The heart and soul of the Chiefs once-vaunted defense departed when Willie Lanier and Jim Lynch retired following the season.

=== Signs of improvement, 1978–1982 ===
For 1978, Marv Levy's systematic restocking of a relatively barren defensive roster began with a 1978 draft class that included defensive end Art Still and linebacker Gary Spani. Running back Ed Podolak, who was the club's all-time leading rusher at the time, retired in the offseason on June 15.

Perhaps Levy's most unconventional tactic in rebuilding the Chiefs was installing the "Wing-T offense". "It was a situation where we took over a team that had the worst defensive record in the history of the National Football League", Levy explained. "We wanted to keep that defense off the field, so we ran the ball 60 times a game." The 1978 Chiefs team ran and ran often, posting franchise records with 663 rushing attempts and 2,986 ground yards. Levy's squad ran the ball a staggering 69 times in a 24–23 Opening Day win at Cincinnati on September 3, the most rushing attempts in an NFL contest since 1948. Five different players had 100-yard rushing games during the year, including running back Tony Reed, who finished the season with 1,053 yards to become the team's first 1,000-yard back since 1967. Despite the squad's Opening Day success, the club lost 10 of its next 11 games, including a pair of overtime decisions. However, the team showed signs of improvement with the defense recording a 23–0 shutout against San Diego on November 26 as the club concluded its first 16-game schedule with a 4–12 mark.

In 1979, Kansas City owned a pair of picks in the first round of the draft, selecting defensive end Mike Bell and quarterback Steve Fuller. By the season's third game, Fuller had supplanted Mike Livingston as the club's starter.

With Fuller at the helm, the Chiefs owned a 4–2 record after six games, but a five-game mid-season losing stretch sullied that effort. Despite finishing fifth in the AFC West for a second straight season, Kansas City's 7–9 record was a notable accomplishment considering the fact that the division's other four clubs all posted winning records for a second consecutive season. The Chiefs lost a 3–0 decision at Tampa Bay on December 16 in one of the most water-logged contests in franchise annals. As both clubs struggled to move the ball under monsoon-like conditions, a late, fourth-quarter field goal by the Buccaneers averted the NFL's first scoreless tie since 1943.

In 1980, the Chiefs selected guard Brad Budde in the first round of the draft, the son of former Chiefs guard Ed Budde, as the team's first-round draft choice, making the Buddes the first father-son combination to become first-round draftees of the same team in NFL history. In a then-controversial move on August 26, the Chiefs released placekicker Jan Stenerud, who at the time was club's all-time leading scorer. He was replaced by journeyman Nick Lowery, who had been cut 11 times by eight different teams himself.

After enduring an 0–4 start, the club rebounded to post a four-game winning streak, starting with a 31–17 victory in Oakland, in which Raiders quarterback Dan Pastorini broke his leg and was replaced by Jim Plunkett, who guided the team to the Super Bowl XV championship. After Steve Fuller was sidelined with a knee injury late in the season, former Miami 12th-round draft choice Bill Kenney became the team's starting quarterback. He was so anonymous that when he appeared in that contest, the name on the back of his jersey was inadvertently misspelled "Kenny." Kenney went on to lead the club to a 31–14 victory against Denver on December 7 in his initial NFL start. The defense continued to evolve as defensive end Art Still and safety Gary Barbaro became the first Chiefs defensive players to be elected to the Pro Bowl in five seasons. The Chiefs finished the year at 8–8, the club's highest victory tally since 1972.

"I've played against the best—O. J. Simpson, Gale Sayers, Walter Payton and (Delaney) ranks right up there with them ... He is great with a capital G."
~Elvin Bethea, Houston Oilers hall of fame defensive end.

Bill Kenney began the 1981 season as the club's starting quarterback and directed the Chiefs to a 6–2 start, including a 37–33 win over the Steelers on Opening Day. Second-round draft choice, running back Joe Delaney electrified the club's offense by rushing for 1,121 yards, a team single-season record at the time. He was named the AFC's Rookie of the Year and became the first running back to represent the franchise in the Pro Bowl. Delaney registered a 193-yard performance in a 23–10 victory against the Oilers on November 15, the best single-game total ever amassed by a Kansas City rookie.

Owning an 8–4 record with four games remaining, the Chiefs were poised to make the playoffs for the first time in 10 years. However, a three-game losing streak ended the anticipation. Bill Kenney missed the club's final three contests due to injury as Steve Fuller temporarily reclaimed the starting QB position and guided the club to a 10–6 win at Minnesota, in the final contest played at Metropolitan Stadium. With the Chiefs winning the game, Vikings fans began dismembering the stadium as early as the second half—taking seats, pieces of the scoreboard and even chunks of sod as souvenirs. The victory assured the Chiefs of a 9–7 record, the club's first winning mark since 1973 as coach Marv Levy increased the club's victory total for a third consecutive year. Inspired by the Washington Redskins's "Hail to the Redskins", Levy penned a fight song for the Chiefs called "Give a Cheer for Kansas City" which never caught on.

In 1982, running back Joe Delaney underwent surgery to repair a detached retina in his eye, a radical procedure at the time. Optimism abounded at Arrowhead thanks to the club's promising 9–7 record from 1981, but swelling labor unrest from NFL players spelled doom for both the Chiefs and Levy in 1982. The Chiefs split their first two games of the year before a 57-day strike by the NFL Players Association began at midnight on September 20. The strike concluded on November 17 after six games were canceled and one was rescheduled, but the Chiefs would never recover, dropping four straight games after their return to the field. Center Jack Rudnay, who had been one of the franchise's most durable and decorated offensive performers over the past decade, announced on December 20 that he would retire after the season. Despite wins in two of the season's final three games, the Levy era concluded as the club finished the strike-shortened campaign at 3–6.

=== Unbalanced chemistry, 1983–1988 ===
==== 1983 ====
To begin 1983, the Chiefs fired head coach Marv Levy on January 4 after compiling a 31–42 record. Dallas Cowboys quarterbacks coach John Mackovic was named the fifth head coach in team history on February 2. The 39-year-old Mackovic became the youngest individual ever to hold that post for the club. The Chiefs held the seventh overall pick in the quarterback-laden 1983 NFL draft and selected Todd Blackledge. The five other signal-callers selected in the first round that year included John Elway, Jim Kelly, Tony Eason, Ken O'Brien and Dan Marino.

Tragedy struck the club on June 29 when Joe Delaney drowned trying to save the lives of three youngsters in Monroe, Louisiana. Delaney was posthumously awarded the Presidential Citizen's Medal by Ronald Reagan on July 13. Linebacker Bobby Bell became the first Chiefs player to be inducted into the Pro Football Hall of Fame on July 30, providing some solace for the mourning Chiefs fan base following Joe Delaney's death.

With Kenney and Blackledge both on the roster, starting QB Steve Fuller was traded to the Los Angeles Rams on August 19. Kenney earned a Pro Bowl berth after racking up a franchise-record 4,348 passing yards, while wide receiver Carlos Carson hauled in 80 passes for 1,351 yards. Despite the team's high-flying passing game, head coach John Mackovic had trouble finding a suitable replacement for Joe Delaney and the running back position. The highest scoring contest in franchise history took place as the Chiefs and Seattle Seahawks combined for 99 points in a wild, 51–48 overtime loss at the Kingdome. A meager crowd of 11,377 attended the club's season-ending 48–17 win against Denver on December 18, the smallest attendance figure ever for a Chiefs game at Arrowhead as the club finished the year at 6–10.

==== 1984 ====
Pro Bowl safety Gary Barbaro became the most notable Chiefs player to defect to the rival United States Football League, signing with the New Jersey Generals on February 2 after sitting out the entire 1983 campaign in a contract dispute. Barbaro's departure and the trade of cornerback Gary Green began a youth movement that produced the most vaunted secondary in team history. Cornerbacks Kevin Ross and Albert Lewis, and safeties Deron Cherry and Lloyd Burruss accounted for a combined 13 Pro Bowl appearances for the Chiefs in the years to come.

All-America defensive tackle Bill Maas and offensive tackle John Alt were both selected in the first round of the 1984 NFL draft. Maas was named NFL Defensive Rookie of the Year, while Alt eventually became the cornerstone of the club's offensive line later in the decade. Kansas City's defense registered a team-record 11.0 sacks in a 10–6 win against Cleveland on September 30, coming one sack shy of the NFL single-game record.

Quarterback Bill Kenney suffered a broken thumb during the preseason and was sidelined until the season's seventh week. Second year back-up QB Todd Blackledge opened the first six contests of the season and had the club at 3–3. Kenney returned to the starting lineup against the New York Jets on October 21, but inconsistency marked the rest of the season as the club dropped four of first five contests after his return. However, the team rattled off three consecutive wins to conclude the year at 8–8.

==== 1985 ====
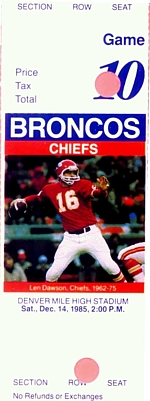
A ticket for a 1985 game between the Chiefs and the Denver Broncos

The Chiefs got off to a flying start in 1985 with a 47–27 win at New Orleans, while safety Deron Cherry tied an NFL record by registering four interceptions in a 28–7 win against Seattle on September 29 as the club boasted a 3–1 record four games into the season. The club was then confronted with a seven-game losing streak that wasn't snapped until QB Todd Blackledge was installed as the starter against Indianapolis on November 24. The team rebounded to win three of its final five contests of the year with Blackledge under center, further inflaming a quarterback controversy that continued into the 1986 season.

One of the few remaining bright spots in a disappointing 6–10 season came in the regular season finale against San Diego when wide receiver Stephone Paige set an NFL record with 309 receiving yards in a 38–34 win, breaking the previous mark of 303 yards set by Cleveland's Jim Benton in 1945. Paige's mark was subsequently surpassed by a 336-yard effort by Flipper Anderson (L.A. Rams) in 1989.

==== 1986 ====
Former linebacker Willie Lanier was enshrined in the Pro Football Hall of Fame on August 2. On the field, the pieces started coming together for head coach John Mackovic. His offense displayed plenty of scoring punch, while the club's defense and special teams became increasingly effective. With the team sitting at 3–3, Bill Kenney replaced Todd Blackledge for the second half of the season in a game against San Diego, guiding the club to a 42–41 victory. That win was the first of four consecutive triumphs with Kenney at the helm, the club's longest winning streak since 1980. Poised with a 7–3 record after 10 games, three straight losses in November put the Chiefs playoff chances in jeopardy. Two December wins gave Kansas City a 9–6 mark, putting the Chiefs on the verge of their first postseason berth in 15 years.

The defining moment of the season came in the regular season finale at Pittsburgh on December 21. Despite being outgained in total yardage by a 515-to-171-yard margin, the Chiefs were able to notch a 24–19 victory as all of the team's points came via special teams on a blocked punt return, a field goal, a kickoff return and a blocked field goal return. With a 10–6 record the Chiefs earned an AFC Wild Card berth, winning a tiebreaker with Seattle. Bill Kenney was injured in the fourth quarter of the Steelers contest, meaning Todd Blackledge would draw the starting assignment for the club's first playoff contest since 1971, a 35–15 loss at New York.

==== 1987 ====
One of the most tumultuous weeks in franchise history took place following the club's playoff loss against the Jets. Assistant head coach and special teams coach Frank Gansz, resigned his position on January 7 in order to pursue opportunities as an NFL offensive coordinator. The following day, the Chiefs announced in an impromptu press conference that John Mackovic was relieved of his duties as head coach on January 8. A popular figure among Chiefs players, Gansz was reinstated on January 10 and was named the sixth head coach in franchise history.

Former quarterback Len Dawson became the third Chiefs player inducted into the Pro Football Hall of Fame on August 8, while injuries forced the retirement of the club's all-time leading tackler Gary Spani. A duo of rookies made a splash in a 20–13 win on Opening Day against San Diego as running back Paul Palmer returned a kickoff for a TD and Christian Okoye dashed for 105 yards. A 24-day players strike began on September 22, effectively canceling the club's contest against Minnesota. Replacement players participated in games for the next three weeks. Much like Marv Levy five years earlier, Gansz's grip on the club's coaching reins was crippled by the labor unrest.

Kansas City's replacement squad consisted primarily of players cut in training camp. One of the few bright spots among this motley crew was running back Jitter Fields, who remained on the active roster following the strike. The Chiefs strike squad received an ominous welcome in Los Angeles when in the early morning hours of October 4, the day prior to a contest against the Raiders, an earthquake rattled Southern California. The shaken Chiefs lost a 35–17 decision later that day. The low point of the year came the following week at Miami in the first regular season game played at what then was known as Joe Robbie Stadium. Chiefs replacement QB Matt Stevens was injured early in the contest, forcing into duty QB Alex Espinoza, a player who had never taken an NFL snap. The result was a 42–0 Dolphins victory, setting the stage for an 0–3 performance by Kansas City's replacement unit, giving the Chiefs a 1–4 record before the club's regular roster returned at San Diego on October 25. Five straight losses followed, giving the Chiefs a team-record nine-game losing skid. For the only time in team history, five different players started games at quarterback for the club. Behind Kenney, Kansas City won two of its last three games to conclude the strike-shortened 4–11 campaign.

==== 1988 ====
The spring was marked by several notable trades as the club jockeyed to improve on its 4–11 finish in 1987. Todd Blackledge was traded to Pittsburgh on March 29 and 12-year veteran quarterback Steve DeBerg was acquired from Tampa Bay on March 31. The Chiefs moved up one spot in the first round of the draft to select defensive end Neil Smith with the third overall pick. Bill Kenney opened the team's initial two games at quarterback, but was replaced by DeBerg for the second half against Seattle. DeBerg guided the team to a 20–13 win against Denver in his initial start as a member of the Chiefs. However, six losses and a tie followed as Kenney and DeBerg jostled for the QB job.

As the season drew to a close, it became apparent the winds of change were blowing across the organization. President Jack Steadman resigned on December 8, while general manager Jim Schaaf was relieved of his duties the same day. Steadman was later named chairman of the board. On the field, the Chiefs finished the year at 4–11–1 as questions swirled regarding Gansz's future and who would fill the club's leadership void. One day after the season's conclusion, former Philadelphia Eagles and USFL executive Carl Peterson was named the club's president/general manager and chief operating officer on December 19.

== A change of face ==
=== "Martyball", 1989–2000 ===
After compiling an 8–22–1 record in two seasons, Frank Gansz was relieved of his duties as head coach on January 5, 1989. General manager Carl Peterson's selection as Gansz's successor would be former Cleveland Browns head coach Marty Schottenheimer, who was named the seventh head coach in Chiefs history on January 24. The first draft choice of the Peterson era set the tone for the next decade as the club selected linebacker Derrick Thomas with the fourth overall selection. Thomas paired with defensive end Neil Smith to form one of the most feared pass-rushing duos in NFL history, compiling a combined 212.5 sacks during their illustrious Chiefs careers. The Peterson-Schottenheimer era got off to an inauspicious start in a 34–20 loss at Denver on September 10 as quarterback Steve DeBerg's first pass attempt was intercepted and returned for a TD. The club won just four times in its next 10 games as former Philadelphia Eagles quarterback Ron Jaworski and Steve Pelluer, who was acquired in a trade from Dallas, each opened three games apiece during that span. DeBerg regained the starting job for the final five weeks of the season, generating four wins that put the Chiefs just out of post-season qualification at 8–7–1. A 34–0 shutout win against Houston highlighted the club's stretch run. Running back Christian Okoye became the first Chief to lead the NFL in rushing with 1,480 yards, while Derrick Thomas won consensus NFL Rookie of the Year honors.

==== 1990 ====
The foundation for the club's formidable offensive line of the 1990s gathered two key ingredients when center Tim Grunhard and guard Dave Szott were acquired in the 1990 NFL draft. Construction began on the club's indoor practice facility at the Truman Sports Complex, giving the Chiefs an 80-yard indoor field and weight room facilities upon its completion. Former defensive tackle Buck Buchanan was inducted into the Pro Football Hall of Fame on August 4. In the pre-season, The Chiefs made their initial overseas appearance, losing a 19–3 American Bowl decision against the Los Angeles Rams at Olympic Stadium in Berlin, Germany. Schottenheimer's club got out of the starting gate quickly, winning three of their first four games. The club then struggled, splitting its next six contests.

Free agent running back Barry Word produced a team-record 200-yard rushing outburst in a 43–24 victory against Detroit on October 14. Kansas City led the NFL with a franchise-record 60.0 sacks, including a team-record 20.0 by Derrick Thomas. Thomas established an NFL single-game record with 7.0 sacks in an inspiring Veterans Day performance against Seattle, a game the Seahawks miraculously won, 17–16, on a last-second, 25-yard TD pass to wide receiver Paul Skansi. That loss brought on the furious stretch run which saw the club record victories in six of its last seven outings. Behind DeBerg's offensive leadership (23 TD passes with just four interceptions) Kansas City finished the year with a franchise-best +26 turnover differential. The Chiefs clinched their first post-season berth since 1986 with a 24–21 win at San Diego and finished the year at 11–5, marking the franchise's best finish since 1969. The Chiefs suffered a heart-breaking, 17–16 loss at Miami on January 5, 1991, in an AFC wild card game as placekicker Nick Lowery's potential game-winning 52-yard field goal fell short with 0:56 remaining.

==== 1991 ====
On July 27, former placekicker Jan Stenerud became the first of his position to be inducted into the Pro Football Hall of Fame. The Chiefs moved their training camp to the University of Wisconsin–River Falls after spending the previous 28 summers at William Jewell College in Liberty, Missouri. On September 1, the Chiefs defeated the Atlanta Falcons 14–3 in front of a sold-out crowd at Arrowhead Stadium.

The Chiefs were featured on Monday Night Football three times, including a 33–6 victory over the defending AFC Champion Buffalo Bills before a raucous crowd at Arrowhead on October 7, marking the club's first home Monday Night Football contest in eight years. The club finished the regular season at 10–6, marking the first time since 1968–69 that the franchise had qualified for the playoffs in consecutive seasons. A 27–21 victory against the Los Angeles Raiders in the regular season finale gave the Chiefs the right to host the Raiders just six days later in the inaugural post-season game in Arrowhead's history, and the Chiefs' first home playoff game in 20 years. Thanks to six Los Angeles turnovers, the Chiefs registered their first post-season victory since Super Bowl IV with a 10–6 win in an AFC Wild Card Game on December 28. The following week, the Chiefs lost a 37–14 decision at Buffalo on January 5, 1992, in an AFC Divisional Playoff match-up as the Buffalo Bills' dynamic offense proved to be too much for the Chiefs.

==== 1992 ====
A longtime nemesis with Seattle, "Plan B" free agent quarterback Dave Krieg was signed as the club's starter on March 19. A melancholy off-season awaited the Chiefs, who mourned the passing of Player Personnel Director Whitey Dovell on May 22 and Hall of Fame defensive tackle Buck Buchanan on July 16. Both Dovell and Buchanan lost courageous battles with cancer. Six-time Pro Bowl safety Deron Cherry announced his retirement in July after registering 50 interceptions in 11 seasons with the franchise. The Chiefs retired the jerseys of former players Buck Buchanan (#86), Willie Lanier (#63) and Jan Stenerud (#3) in a ceremony prior to a pre-season contest against Buffalo.

First-round draft pick, cornerback Dale Carter won the Bert Bell Trophy as the NFL's Rookie of the Year. The very first time Carter touched the ball in an NFL contest, he registered a 46-yard punt return touchdown in a 24–10 win at San Diego on September 6. Running back Christian Okoye surpassed Ed Podolak as the all-time leading rusher in team history against Seattle on September 13. Injuries eventually made the 1992 campaign Okoye's last with the Chiefs after he compiled 4,897 rushing yards with the franchise. The club got off to a 3–1 start, but was faced with a 4–4 record at the season's midpoint. Despite four consecutive victories, the club's post-season hopes still came down to the season's final contest. Owning a 9–6 record and needing one more victory to secure a playoff berth, the Chiefs defense tallied three touchdowns, while Dave Krieg tossed a pair of scoring passes as Kansas City claimed a 42–20 win against Denver to finish the season at 10–6. Despite the big win against Denver, the Chiefs made a quick exit from the playoffs as Krieg was sacked 7 times in a 17–0 AFC Wild Card loss at San Diego on January 2, 1993.

==== 1993 ====
The Chiefs spent the off-season installing the "West Coast offense" under the direction of new offensive coordinator Paul Hackett, who at one time served as quarterbacks coach to Joe Montana in San Francisco. On April 20, the Chiefs traded for Joe Montana, who directed the 49ers to four Super Bowl victories in the previous decade. Guard Will Shields was selected with the club's third-round draft choice, rounding out the "law firm" of Grunhard, Szott and Shields which anchored the interior of Chiefs offensive line for most of the decade.

On June 9, the club signed unrestricted free agent running back Marcus Allen, who had spent 11 seasons tormenting the Chiefs as a member of the rival Los Angeles Raiders. Montana and Allen made their debuts in a 27–3 win at Tampa Bay on September 5, marking Montana's first Opening Day appearance since 1990. Shields initiated a franchise-record streak of 175 consecutive starts the following week at Houston. Thanks to a pair of Monday Night Football wins at Arrowhead, the club owned a 6–2 mid-season record. Before taking the field in a Sunday night contest at Minnesota on December 26, the team learned it had clinched its first AFC West title since 1971 thanks to a Raiders loss earlier in the day. The team finished the season with an 11–5 regular season record, marking the club's fourth consecutive year with a double-digit victory tally. Linebacker Derrick Thomas was named the NFL's Man of the Year following the season. Thomas, who founded "The Third and Long Foundation", received the honor in large part due to his efforts in promoting children's literacy.

Kansas City got its first true taste of "Montana Magic" as the Hall of Fame passer engineered a brilliant comeback in a 27–24 OT win in an AFC Wild Card thriller against Pittsburgh on January 8, 1994. Next, the Chiefs traveled to the Astrodome to face the red-hot Oilers, who had won 11 straight games to conclude the regular season. The heavily favored Oilers opened up a 13–7 lead in the fourth quarter, but once again, Montana conjured a comeback, guiding the club to a 28–20 victory. The Chiefs playoff journey ended as the club made its initial AFC Championship Game appearance at Buffalo on January 23. Montana was knocked out of the contest early in the second half as Buffalo claimed its record fourth straight AFC title by a score of 30–13. The win over the Oilers marked the last time the Chiefs won a playoff game until 2015, and the win over the Steelers marked the last time until 2018 that they won a playoff game at Arrowhead Stadium.

==== 1994 ====
While the previous off-season saw the Chiefs stockpile several key free agents, a number of familiar faces departed following the 1993 season, most notably cornerbacks Albert Lewis and Kevin Ross, as well as placekicker Nick Lowery. Quarterback Steve Bono was acquired in a trade with San Francisco on May 2 to serve as Joe Montana's backup, a job he previously held when both were with the 49ers. A grass playing field was installed at Arrowhead Stadium, replacing the previous AstroTurf surface. The club made its second American Bowl appearance in the pre-season, meeting Minnesota in Tokyo, Japan.

On September 11, Steve Young and the San Francisco 49ers came to Arrowhead to play against Joe Montana and the Chiefs in a highly anticipated matchup. The Chiefs prevailed over the 49ers and Montana's successor by a 24–17 count before a crowd of 79,907, the second-largest "in-house" attendance in Arrowhead history. After starting the season 3–0, the Chiefs dropped back-to-back games before snapping an 11-game losing streak against Denver at Mile High Stadium on October 17 in a memorable Monday night contest. Montana orchestrated a masterful comeback, connecting with WR Willie Davis for a five-yard TD with 0:08 remaining to give the Chiefs a 31–28 triumph. A late-season, three-game losing skid put the club's playoff hopes in jeopardy. The Chiefs found themselves at 8–7 faced with a do-or-die regular season finale against the Raiders in the final NFL contest (to date) played at the Los Angeles Coliseum and in Los Angeles until 2016. Marcus Allen had his finest game as a Chief, ironically against his former team, rushing 33 times for 132 yards en route to a 19–9 win. At 9–7, Kansas City qualified for the playoffs for a fifth straight season. However, the Chiefs made a rapid departure from the playoffs in Montana's final professional contest at Miami on New Year's Eve. Montana and Dolphins' quarterback Dan Marino conducted a masterful first-half duel that ended deadlocked at 17–17, but Miami eventually prevailed by a 27–17 count.

==== 1995 ====
Joe Montana announced his retirement from football after 16 years in the NFL on April 18 and Steve Bono was promoted to the starting job. Immediately, so-called media experts predicted much gloom and doom for the 1995 Chiefs under Bono, leading Schottenheimer to quip during training camp that his club had been picked "sixth in a five-team division." Led by Bono, who merited a Pro Bowl berth, Kansas City posted an NFL-best 13–3 record with unblemished 8–0 marks in the AFC West and at Arrowhead. The Chiefs led the NFL in rushing offense (138.9 ypg), scoring defense (15.1 ppg) and turnover ratio (+12). A 24–3 win at Arizona on October 1 featured a surreal, 76-yard TD run on a bootleg by Bono as the Chiefs initiated a seven-game winning streak, the franchise's longest since 1969. In a Monday Night Football classic against San Diego on October 9, wide receiver Tamarick Vanover returned a punt for an 86-yard TD to provide the winning points in a 29–23 victory, the team's third straight home win in overtime.

The club's defense began to flex its muscle, beginning with a 21–7 win at Denver on October 22. The contest, played in a Rocky Mountain snowstorm, featured the 100th rushing TD of Marcus Allen's career. The Chiefs won a home game for the third time on a last-second return score that concluded in Arrowhead's west end zone when cornerback Mark Collins scooped up a fumble for a 20–13 win against Houston. Kansas City clinched a division title with a 29–23 victory at Oakland on December 3 en route to a franchise-best 13–3 regular season record and a team-record sixth consecutive postseason berth. The Chiefs were represented by seven players in the Pro Bowl, more than any other AFC team. In the playoffs, the Chiefs dropped an AFC Divisional Playoff Game against the underdog Indianapolis Colts on January 7—a blustery afternoon with the temperature at 11 degrees and a wind chill of −9. Three interceptions and three missed field goals from placekicker Lin Elliot contributed to the 10–7 loss at Arrowhead.

==== 1996 ====
Kansas City entered the 1996 campaign with essentially the same lineup as the club boasted in 1995 and were featured on the cover of Sports Illustrated along with Green Bay as pre-season Super Bowl favorites. Kansas City made its third American Bowl appearance, this time against Dallas in Monterrey, Mexico. The club started the season with a 4–0 record for the first time in team history, but the season's lofty expectations came crashing down as the squad lost three of its next four games. A three-game winning streak, including a victory over the eventual Super Bowl champion Packers, put the club back in post-season contention at 8–3.

That rosy picture quickly crumbled in a 28–14 loss against San Diego on November 24 as Steve Bono was relieved in the second half by back-up quarterback Rich Gannon. Gannon assumed the starting reins for a 28–24 win in a Thanksgiving Day game at Detroit as Marcus Allen registered his 111th career rushing TD to surpass Walter Payton as the NFL's all-time leader in that department, a mark that was later broken by Emmitt Smith. Needing just one more win to qualify for the playoffs, the Chiefs dropped their next two games as an injury-hampered Gannon was sidelined for good in the second quarter of a 24–19 loss against Indianapolis. Faced with a must-win situation in a frigid regular season finale at Buffalo, the club's post-season hopes hinged on Bono. Despite a 20–9 loss to the Bills, the Chiefs still had a shot to slip into the playoffs if Atlanta could secure a win at Jacksonville. However, Atlanta placekicker Morten Andersen's 30-yard field goal attempt went wide left with 0:04 remaining, preserving a 19–17 win and the AFC's final Wild Card spot for the Jaguars, who won a tiebreaker with Kansas City. The Chiefs finished with a 9–7 record, missing the postseason for the first time since 1989.

==== 1997 ====
Kansas City dramatically retooled its roster in 1997, beginning with the signing of free agent quarterback Elvis Grbac on March 17. In addition to Grbac, the Chiefs lineup featured 11 new starters, including wide receiver Andre Rison, who won team MVP honors after becoming the club's first Pro Bowl receiver in a decade. On defense, the club's top four picks from the 1996 Draft, safeties Jerome Woods and Reggie Tongue, defensive end John Browning and linebacker Donnie Edwards, all emerged as starters.

Tackle John Alt announced his retirement at training camp in River Falls, Wisconsin on July 21. All the new faces quickly formed a cohesive unit as the Chiefs posted a 13–3 record, an 8–0 Arrowhead record and their second AFC West title in three years. The club engineered several dramatic finishes, the first of which came in a Monday Night Football thriller at Oakland on September 8 when Elvis Grbac connected with Andre Rison on an improbable 32-yard TD pass with just 0:03 remaining to cap a 28–27 win. Six days later, Kansas City's defense produced a remarkable goal-line stand to preserve a 22–16 victory at Arrowhead vs. Buffalo. After posting a 6–2 record during the season's first half, Kansas City's good fortune appeared to run out against Pittsburgh when Grbac suffered a broken clavicle. However, Rich Gannon led the team to a 5–1 mark in their next six outings.

Placekicker Pete Stoyanovich provided one of the year's most memorable moments, connecting on a line-drive 54-yard field as time expired to give Kansas City a 24–22 win against Denver on November 16. San Francisco entered Arrowhead boasting an 11-game winning streak, the team departed after suffering a 44–9 defeat. The Chiefs' vaunted defensive unit pitched a 30–0 shutout vs. Oakland on December 7. The Chiefs led the NFL in scoring defense, allowing a mere 14.5 points per game. The 232 total points permitted by the Chiefs in 1997 were the lowest tally ever allowed in a 16-game season in team history. Kansas City also broke a 63-year-old mark owned by the 1934 Detroit Lions by not permitting a second-half TD in 10 consecutive games. Grbac returned for the regular season finale against New Orleans on December 21 as the squad finished the year with six consecutive victories, a first in team history.

The Chiefs' 13–3 record gave them home field advantage throughout the AFC Playoffs. However, their playoff run was short-lived, as Kansas City lost to the eventual Super Bowl champion Denver Broncos 14–10 in the Divisional round.

==== 1998 ====
The following year, with Elvis Grbac back at the helm, the Chiefs fell to 7–9 in 1998. Marty Schottenheimer took much of the blame for his failed attempts in the playoffs and conservative style of coaching ("Martyball"), and resigned following the 1998 season.

==== 1999 ====
Schottenheimer left as head coach, replaced by his defensive coach Gunther Cunningham. In two years, Cunningham showed little improvement, going 9–7 and 7–9. After the loss of Derrick Thomas, the collapse of the defense was unmistakable. The Chiefs' wins were mostly made by a high scoring offense rather than a powerful defense.

== 2001–2017: The Chiefs in the early 21st century ==
=== An explosive offense, 2001–2005 ===
==== 2001 ====
After coaching the St. Louis Rams to the Super Bowl and retiring, Dick Vermeil was lured out of retirement and took over as head coach in 2001. It was noted that Vermeil would have the team ready for the Super Bowl "within three years", while in fact Vermeil would stay in Kansas City for the next five.

The first move the team made was forced after quarterback Elvis Grbac voided his contract, forgoing an $11 million bonus, leaving to lead the Super Bowl champion Baltimore Ravens. Vermeil replaced him with his primary pick for the Rams' quarterback, Trent Green.

Another notable replacement was Priest Holmes at running back, who had served as back-up to Baltimore's Jamal Lewis in their Super Bowl season. Additions to the offensive line, including left tackle Willie Roaf from New Orleans, Casey Wiegmann at center, Brian Waters at guard, and John Welbourn from Philadelphia helped create the Chiefs' high powered offense. Holmes would go on to break Marshall Faulk's record of 26 touchdowns in a season on December 27, 2003.

Vermeil brought many elements of "The Greatest Show on Turf" from St. Louis to Kansas City's own offense, but much like the Schottenheimer era in the 1990s, the offense didn't win any playoff games.

==== 2003 ====
The Chiefs went 13–3 in 2003 and their offense, considered by many as one of the most powerful of all time, helped make Kansas City again a favorite to win Super Bowl XXXVIII. After starting 9–0, the Chiefs lost to the Cincinnati Bengals in their tenth game following a "guarantee" by Bengals wide receiver Chad Johnson. The Chiefs' dream season of 2003 began to lose momentum by November, but they still managed to gain the number two seed in the 2004 playoffs. The mighty homefield advantage of Arrowhead Stadium and their high-powered offense wouldn't lead the Chiefs to glory and the Chiefs lost to the Indianapolis Colts in the AFC Divisional playoffs in an offensive shootout in which neither team punted, an NFL playoffs first. The Chiefs' defense came under fire immediately after the loss, and Greg Robinson, the team's defensive coordinator, resigned in disgrace after the season.

==== 2004 ====
As with the loss to the Broncos in 1997, this loss led to a poor following season. The Chiefs managed to finish the 2004 season with a 7–9 record. In 2004, Gunther Cunningham was brought back as the defensive coordinator. However, the defense showed little improvement. The offense, unable to record the same high scores as the previous year, was unable to bring in the wins as they had the previous year.

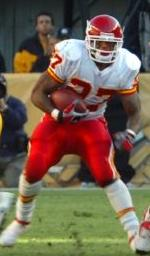
Running back Larry Johnson

==== 2005 ====
For their 2005 campaign, the Chiefs brought in several new players to boost a defense that had finished among the worst units the past three years. The year also saw Larry Johnson start at running back in place of an injured Priest Holmes. But despite winning ten games, the Chiefs became just the fourth team in NFL history to go 10–6 and not reach the playoffs.

=== Rebuilding a contender, 2006–2012 ===
==== 2006 ====
A tearful head coach Dick Vermeil announced his retirement before the final game of the 2005 season. Within two weeks, then-New York Jets head coach Herman Edwards had signed a new 4-year contract to coach the Chiefs. The 2006 Chiefs returned to the playoffs for the first time in three seasons, only to lose 23–8 in the wild-card round against their playoff nemesis, the Indianapolis Colts.

Meanwhile, Chiefs owner and founder Lamar Hunt died on December 13, 2006, due to complications brought on by a ten-year battle with prostate cancer. Hunt was remembered throughout the remainder of the 2006 season all throughout the NFL with moments of silence and ceremonies in Kansas City. Hunt's four children inherited ownership of the Chiefs. And Clark, became chairman and CEO of the Chiefs, and the public face of the ownership group. He represents the Chiefs at owner meetings, and has the final say in team operations.

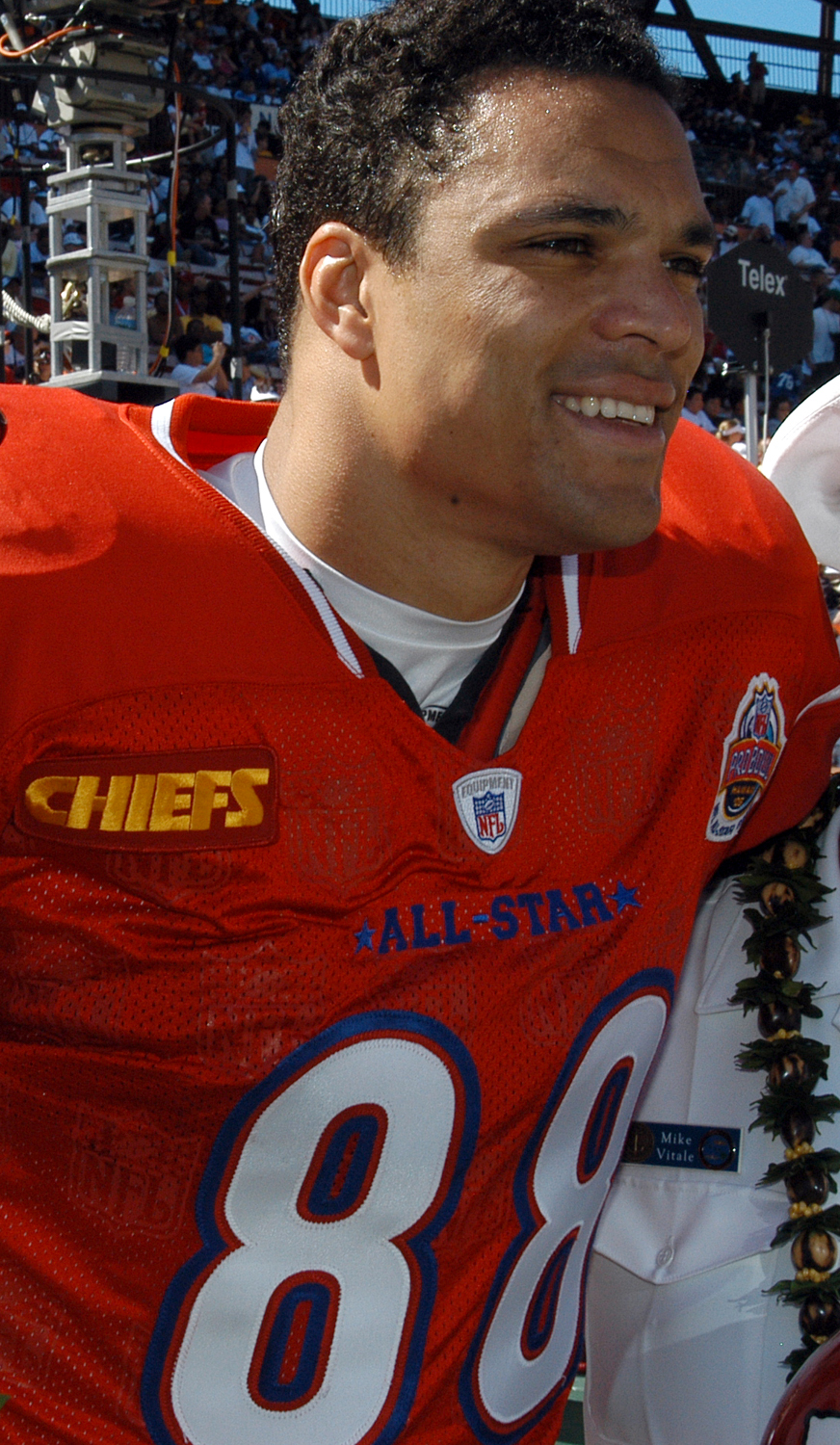
Tight end Tony Gonzalez in 2005

==== 2007 ====
The Chiefs' 2007 off-season began with turmoil over the contract of Tony Gonzalez, and the long-term career of Trent Green in Kansas City. Backup quarterback Damon Huard was signed to a three-year contract in February and Green was not only asked to restructure his contract but offered in trades to other teams.

On June 5, the Chiefs agreed to trade Green to the Miami Dolphins for a conditional fifth round pick in the 2008 NFL draft, pending a physical from Green.

The Chiefs' 2007 training camp was documented in the HBO/NFL Films documentary reality television series, Hard Knocks: Training Camp with the Kansas City Chiefs The series premiered on August 8, 2007.

After a strong 4–3 start, the Chiefs' offensive woes slowed the team down. Five different running backs were used after Larry Johnson was injured in week 9 against Green Bay. The team also had no stability at quarterback with Huard and Brodie Croyle, while their offensive line depleted in the absence of their former Pro Bowl guard Will Shields.

The season ended with a nine-game losing streak, the team's first since 1987, and a 4–12 record. It was the Chiefs' first season with 12 losses since 1978.

Head coach Herman Edwards continued to build upon the Chiefs' roster with young players, mostly on defense, and attempted stabilize a once record-setting offensive line.

To honor their late owner Lamar Hunt, the Chiefs wore a special American Football League patch on their uniforms with the initials "LH" emblazoned inside the logo's football.

==== 2008–2012 ====
In the 2008 season opener at New England, Patriots quarterback Tom Brady was hit in the leg by Chiefs safety Bernard Pollard, tearing his ACL and removing him from action for the rest of the year. Other than that, there was little else of note about the season, which saw Kansas City fall to a franchise-worst 2–14 record.

During the next offseason, the team made news by acquiring quarterback Matt Cassel (who had filled in for Brady during the previous year) and veteran linebacker Mike Vrabel from New England for a second-round draft pick, which was used to obtain LSU defensive end Tyson Jackson. The Chiefs were also awarded the 256th and last player in the draft for the first time since 1970, South Carolina kicker Ryan Succop. Also, Scott Pioli was hired as general manager, yet another acquisition from New England. On January 23, 2009, head coach Herm Edwards was fired. On February 6, 2009, former Arizona Cardinals offensive coordinator Todd Haley was hired as the team's 11th head coach.

There was little apparent sign of improvement as the Chiefs began 2009 by losing five games in a row before a victory over the Washington Redskins in Week 6. However, the team did manage to inflict an overtime defeat on the defending Super Bowl Champion Pittsburgh Steelers in Week 11, and closed out the year with a 4–12 record by overpowering Denver and preventing the Broncos from going to the playoffs. In that game, second-year running back Jamaal Charles set a franchise record by rushing for 259 yards.

The Chiefs got off to a 3–0 start in 2010, first by beating San Diego 21–14 on Monday Night Football. This was their first MNF win in a decade, in addition to their first home win over the Chargers since 2006. They followed up the next week with a 16–14 win in Cleveland, followed by a 31–10 thrashing of the San Francisco 49ers at home. The Chiefs entered their bye week as the only remaining undefeated team, but as most experts predicted, fell to Indianapolis 19–9 in Week 5. They lost a close game with the Houston Texans (35–31) in Week 6, beat Jacksonville in Week 7, and then won a razor-thin game against the winless Buffalo Bills. After going into overtime with a 10–10 score, neither team was able to score anything until Ryan Succop kicked a 35-yard field goal just as the clock reached 0:00 and avoiding a tie. Then came losses to Oakland and Denver, three straight wins over Seattle, Arizona, and Denver, a loss in San Diego, and wins over St. Louis and Tennessee. Losing the final game at home versus Oakland, the Chiefs finished 10–6 and won their first division title since 2003. However, the team's lack of postseason experience showed up as they were buried 30–7 by the Baltimore Ravens in the wild card round of the playoffs.

Kansas City began 2011 by losing its first three games, including blowout losses at home against Buffalo and at Detroit, where the Chiefs lost Jamaal Charles for the remainder of the season due to a torn ACL. However, the Chiefs were able to rebound from the slow start, winning their next four contests, including a thrilling overtime victory over San Diego on Monday Night Football. Unfortunately, the Chiefs would lose all momentum the following week when they were stunned at Arrowhead by the winless Miami Dolphins, losing quarterback Matt Cassel for the season with a hand injury. After losing four of the next five, the Chiefs fired head coach Todd Haley less than one year removed from a division title. With interim head coach Romeo Crennel and recently acquired quarterback Kyle Orton at the helm, the Chiefs were able to knock off then-undefeated Green Bay, and at 6–8, still had a shot at the division crown. The Chiefs would fall just short, however, losing 16–13 in overtime to arch-rival Oakland. The Chiefs would finish the 2011 season with a road win versus eventual AFC West champion Denver, finishing the season at 7–9.

The Chiefs hit rock bottom in 2012, with a passing game that was one of the worst of all time. Cassel was benched twice in favor of Brady Quinn, but neither quarterback could perform well enough to win more than one game each. Despite having a roster that produced five Pro Bowlers and a 1,500-yard rushing season from Charles, the Chiefs stumbled to a 1–9 record.

Kansas City's 2012 season took a tragic and bizarre turn on December 1 when linebacker Jovan Belcher murdered his girlfriend in an argument. He then drove to Arrowhead Stadium, where he got into a confrontation with Crennel and several other Chiefs employees in the parking lot. They attempted to calm him down, after which Belcher thanked them and immediately shot himself dead.

With the team scheduled to play against Carolina the next day, there was considerable controversy as to whether the game should go on, but in the end it was decided not to move or cancel it. In a half-empty stadium, the Chiefs won the emotional match 27–21.

After the Chiefs' victory over Carolina, the team did not win again in the 2012 season, only averaging 5.75 points per game in their final four games, and finished the season on a four-game losing streak and with a 2–14 record on the season.

Following the 2012 season, both head coach Romeo Crennel and general manager Scott Pioli were fired from their positions. On January 4, the Chiefs signed former Philadelphia Eagles head coach Andy Reid, who had been fired after coaching the Eagles for the past fourteen years, and on January 13 of the same year the Chiefs hired John Dorsey to be their general manager.

=== The Andy Reid era, 2013–present ===
==== 2013 ====
The Kansas City Chiefs, due to their 2–14 record in the season prior, received the #1 pick in the 2013 NFL draft, which was the first time in franchise history that team had the #1 pick in the NFL Draft that was not acquired in a transaction. However, about eight weeks prior to their first selection in the 2013 NFL Draft, the Chiefs traded for quarterback Alex Smith, who the year prior had been benched in favor of Colin Kaepernick on the San Francisco 49ers. The Chiefs were able to acquire Smith by trading their second round picks in 2013 and 2014. While this move did end up bringing the quarterback for the Chiefs for the next five years to Kansas City, the selection was only supported by a plurality of Chiefs fans at the time of the trade. After an offseason that brought players such as Sean Smith and Geoff Schwartz, the Chiefs selected Eric Fisher with the first pick in the 2013 NFL Draft, as well as selecting future four time Pro Bowler Travis Kelce in the third round of the same draft. In the 2013 season, the Chiefs started the season with an incredible start, tying the 2003 team as the best start in franchise history and being the last team undefeated in the 2013 season, starting out with a 9–0 record. However, due a more difficult second half of the Chiefs schedule and somewhat of a regression by the Chiefs defense, the team faltered down the stretch, going 2–5 in their final seven games.

Even though the team struggled near the end of the season, the Chiefs still clinched a playoff berth as a wildcard and played the Indianapolis Colts in the first round of the 2013–14 NFL playoffs. It seemed that the Chiefs would be able to win their first playoff game in twenty years and go on to the divisional round, but even though the Chiefs took a 38–10 lead in the early portion of the third quarter, the Chiefs were unable to contain the Colts offense and lost the game by only one point, 45–44.

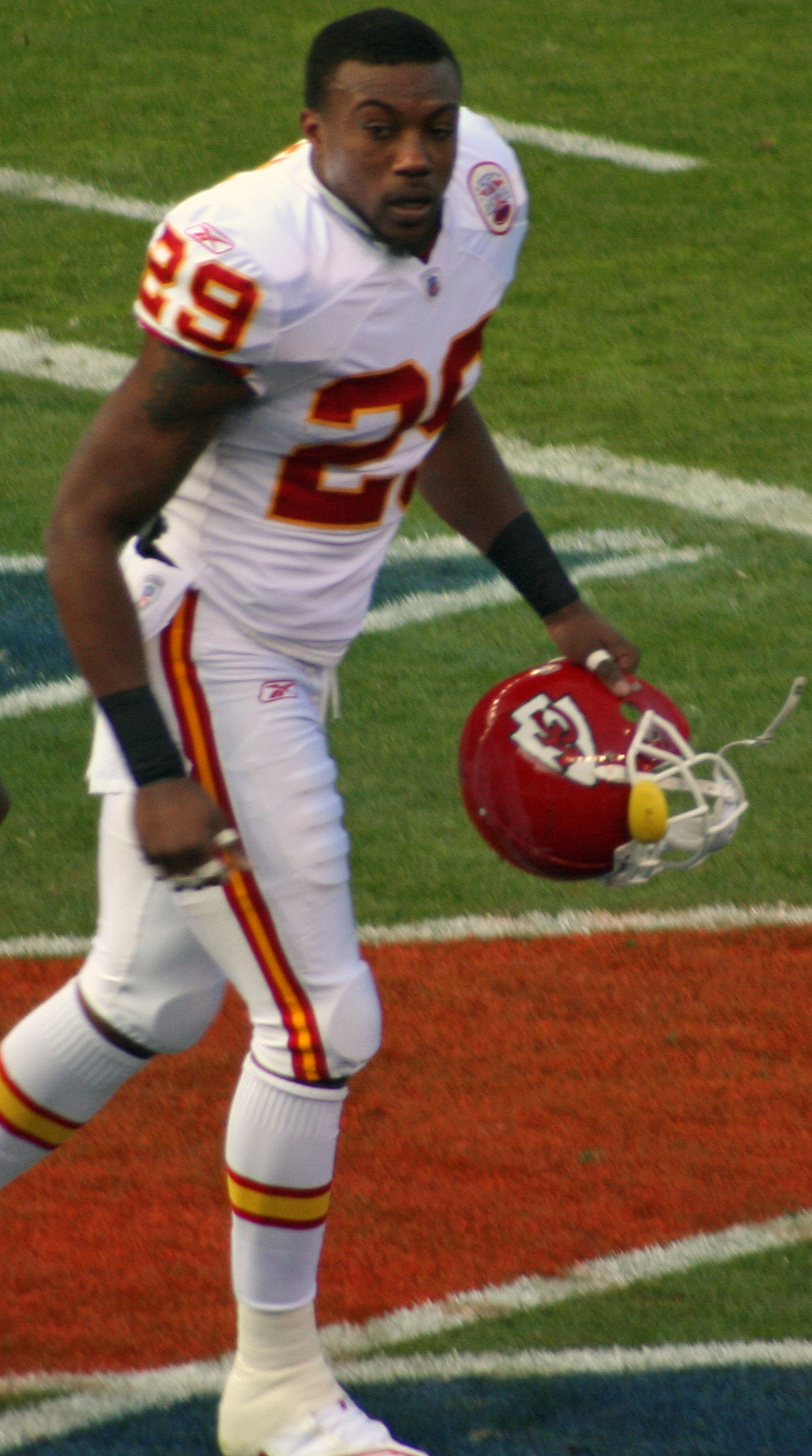
Safety Eric Berry was an integral part of the Chiefs defense in the 2010s

==== 2014 ====
Entering the 2014 season, the Chiefs had the twenty-second pick in the 2014 NFL draft, and selected linebacker Dee Ford out of Alabama, as well as future starting right guard Laurent Duvernay-Tardif with the 200th pick of the same draft.

Unlike the 2013 season, the Chiefs were unable to get out to a good start on the year, as the Chiefs lost their first two and three out of their first five games. However, after a bye week in week 6, the Chiefs went on a tear, as they won their next five games, dominating the St. Louis Rams and the New York Jets, as well as beating the eventual Super Bowl participant Seattle Seahawks to put the team at a 7–3 record after ten games.

However, disaster struck as the team suffered a devastating loss to the winless 0–10 Oakland Raiders, who were able to upset the Chiefs on Thursday Night Football. This led to a three-game losing streak, which put the Chiefs at 7–6 on the season and desperately needing to win out for a chance to play in the NFL playoffs. This did not occur, as the Chiefs lost to the Pittsburgh Steelers in Week 16 and eventually missed the playoffs with a 9–7 record.

One bright spot was LB Justin Houston, who set a franchise record with 22.0 sacks, only 0.5 sacks short of the NFL record set by Michael Strahan.

==== 2015 ====
Entering the 2015 season, the Chiefs had the 18th pick in the 2015 NFL draft, and selected cornerback Marcus Peters out of Washington, who would become the eventual Defensive Rookie of the Year and a two time Pro Bowler for the Kansas City Chiefs. In the same draft, the Chiefs also selected future starters such as Mitch Morse, Chris Conley, and Steven Nelson.

While the Chiefs were able to win their first game against the Houston Texans and in their second game of the season, they held a 24–17 lead with only two minutes to play against the Denver Broncos, who had won the past four AFC West championships, the Chiefs allowed a touchdown and then fumbled with less than 30 seconds remaining, sealing a victory for the Broncos. This loss was the first of five consecutive losses, and the team seemed to be spiraling out of control with a record of 1–5.

The team overall began an improbable eleven game winning streak, beating the eventual Super Bowl Champion Denver Broncos in their third game of the streak, and this streak was able to give the Chiefs the push they needed to make the 2015–16 NFL playoffs, as they clinched in Week 16. While the Chiefs were able to beat the Oakland Raiders the San Diego Chargers fell short and were unable to beat the Denver Broncos, and the Broncos clinched the division and home-field throughout the AFC Playoffs.

In the Chiefs first game of the postseason, they matched up against the 9–7 Houston Texans, and after a 22-year drought, the Chiefs were finally able to win a playoff game as the Chiefs walloped the Texans 30–0. This victory was the first time the Chiefs had won a playoff game since 1993, and gave the Chiefs the chance to make the AFC Championship Game for only the second time in team history, if they could beat the New England Patriots on the road. The Chiefs were unable to beat the Patriots, as injuries and losing the turnover battle sealed the loss for the Chiefs, and they were unable to beat the Patriots and lost 27–20 in the divisional round.

One notable achievement during this season was the first award given to the Chiefs in the Andy Reid era, as Marcus Peters won the Defensive Rookie of the Year award, and Eric Berry also won the comeback Player of the Year award after beating his battle with cancer and playing well with the Chiefs in his first year after his treatment.

==== 2016 ====
In the 2016 NFL draft, the Chiefs traded back out of the first round and instead drafted with the 37th pick in the draft, and used this selection to draft Chris Jones. As well as drafting Chris Jones, the Chiefs selected eventual three-time Pro Bowler Tyreek Hill in the fifth round of the same draft.

The Chiefs start to the season was no more than mediocre, and the before their bye week the Chiefs were destroyed by the Pittsburgh Steelers 43–14, which put the Chiefs on 2–2 for the year. After the bye week, however, the Chiefs won their next five games and were sitting at 7–2 on the season until an upset occurred as the Tampa Bay Buccaneers were able to eke out a two-point victory against the Chiefs at Arrowhead Stadium, as the Bucs won 19–17. The Chiefs experienced an almost identical game against another team that missed the postseason, losing 19–17 to the Tennessee Titans at home. This loss put the Chiefs at 10–4 and the dream of a division title was in jeopardy. Heading into Week 17, the Chiefs were 11–4 and their rival, the Oakland Raiders, were 12–3 but the Raiders did not have the tiebreaker on the Chiefs. In order for the Chiefs to clinch the division, similar to the 2015 season, the Chiefs needed a win and the division leader to lose. Unlike 2015, however, the division leader lost as the Oakland Raiders were unable to start their quarterback, Derek Carr due to an injury and the Raiders lost to the Broncos. The Chiefs were able to pick up a crucial victory over the San Diego Chargers (which would also be their final game in San Diego) and clinch the division and a first-round bye.

Heading into the 2016-17 NFL playoffs, the Chiefs were 12–4 and claimed the second seed in the AFC. After the Pittsburgh Steelers were able to defeat the Miami Dolphins in the Wildcard Round, it was confirmed that the Chiefs would have to play the same team that beat them by 29 points fifteen weeks prior. While the Chiefs were able to hold Pittsburgh from scoring any touchdowns in their divisional round game, the Chiefs were only able to put up 16 points of offense and the Steelers' six field goals were enough to put the Steelers into the AFC Championship Game and once again give a devastating playoff loss to the franchise.

==== 2017 ====
In the 2017 NFL draft, the Chiefs decided to trade up into the draft, giving up their first round selections in 2017 and 2018 as well as their third round pick in 2017 in order to move up to #10 in the draft. With this selection, the Chiefs selected Patrick Mahomes, their first quarterback drafted in the first round since 1983. While Mahomes would only start one game in the 2017 season, he was pegged to become the future of the franchise as the Chiefs had to trade a significant amount of draft capital in order to secure the quarterback. As well, during the offseason John Dorsey was fired and Brett Veach was promoted to become the Chiefs next general manager.

The Chiefs were able to start the season strong, and after five games the Chiefs were 5–0 on the season. However, the Chiefs were unable to keep the winning streak alive and instead started a streak in the other direction, losing six of seven and four in a row. This put the Chiefs at 6–6 on the season and they desperately needed a win against the Los Angeles Chargers to put themselves in a good position to win back to back AFC West titles. The Chiefs were able to beat the Chargers and move to 7–6. The Chiefs were able to win their next two games and clinch the AFC West in Week 16, which was the first time in team history that they had won consecutive division titles. With the Chiefs being locked into the #4 seed in the AFC, the Chiefs rested most of their starters and Patrick Mahomes started his first game of his career. While his numbers were not incredibly impressive, he showed raw talent with several impressive throws. He was also able to win this game, and the Chiefs finished the year at 10–6 and with the #4 seed in the AFC.

In the 2017–18 NFL playoffs, the Chiefs were matched up with the 9–7 Tennessee Titans, led by Marcus Mariota. The Chiefs were able to get out to an early 21–3 lead, but the offense and defense faltered down the stretch and the Chiefs lost another close playoff game as the final score was 22–21 Titans. One bright spot for the team was rookie sensation Kareem Hunt, who led the NFL in rushing yards and was selected to the Pro Bowl as well as being named Co-Offensive Rookie of the Year, along with Alvin Kamara.

== 2018–present: The Reid/Mahomes dynasty ==
=== 2018: First AFC Championship Game in 25 years ===
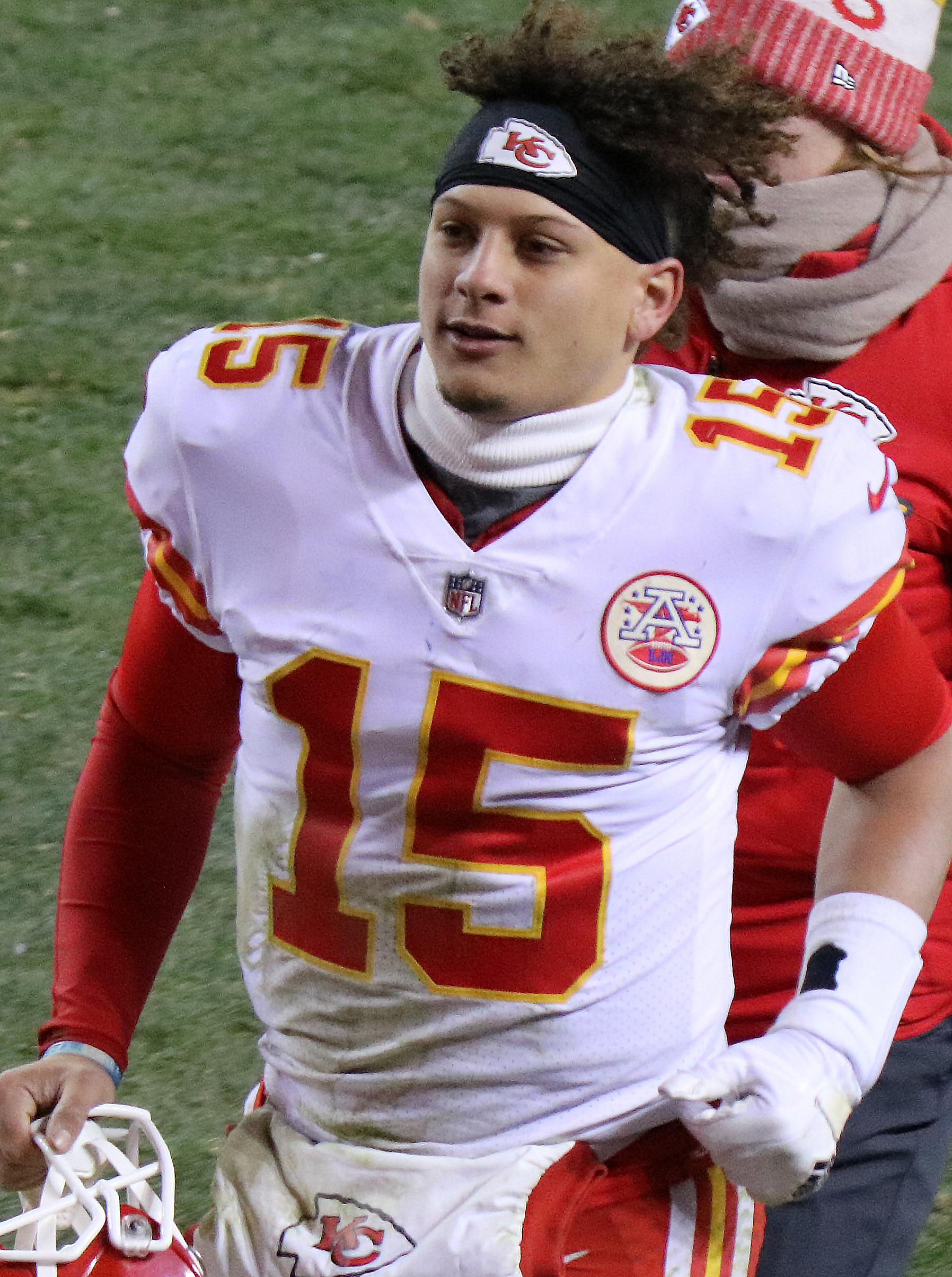
Patrick Mahomes, the Chiefs starting quarterback since 2018, has broken numerous passing records and garnered an MVP award

In the same month as the playoff loss to the Tennessee Titans, a trade was announced between the Chiefs and the Washington Redskins, and after five years of starting at least 15 games in each year, Alex Smith was traded to the Redskins. In return, the Chiefs received Kendall Fuller and a third-round pick.

In the 2018 NFL draft, the Chiefs did not have a first-round selection due to their trade to acquire the selection to draft Patrick Mahomes, but they traded up to select Breeland Speaks in the second round of the NFL Draft. This draft also demonstrated the emphasis on improving the defense as the Chiefs only selected defensive players in the draft.

Identically to 2017, the Chiefs started out the season 5–0 and then lost their following game to an AFC juggernaut, this time to the New England Patriots in primetime. During this stretch, Patrick Mahomes threw ten touchdown passes in his first two games and four more over the next three. This was the start of an incredible campaign for the 23-year-old, as he finished the season with over 5,000 yards and 50 touchdowns, being the second quarterback in NFL history to accomplish that feat, only behind Peyton Manning. After the Chiefs fell to the Patriots, they then won their next four to sit at 9–1 heading into their game against the also 9–1 Los Angeles Rams. While Patrick Mahomes threw six touchdown passes and led his team to over 50 points, he also had five turnovers and the Chiefs became the first team in NFL history to lose a game while also scoring 50 points or more, as the Chiefs lost 54–51. The Chiefs then won their next two games to clinch a playoff berth in Week 14 as they were able to beat the Baltimore Ravens in overtime and sit at 11–2 on the season. Only needing a victory to secure a first-round bye and a third consecutive AFC West title, the Chiefs fell short against the Los Angeles Chargers and fell to 11–3 on the season as they lost 29–28. After the Chargers lost the following Saturday to the Baltimore Ravens and the Houston Texans lost to the Philadelphia Eagles, the Chiefs only needed to beat the Seattle Seahawks to clinch the #1 seed in the AFC and an AFC West title. The Chiefs, however, fell short and lost 38–31. Now sitting at 11–4 and only needing to beat the Oakland Raiders to clinch the #1 seed in the AFC but also having the risk of falling all the way to the #5 seed, the Chiefs walloped the 4–11 Oakland Raiders 35–3, and clinched their third consecutive AFC West title and the #1 seed in the AFC for the first time since 1997.

Heading into the 2018–19 NFL playoffs, the Chiefs were sitting at 12–4 and were the #1 seed in the AFC. After the Indianapolis Colts were able to beat the Houston Texans on the road, the Colts came to Kansas City to play the Chiefs in a divisional round matchup. The Colts to this point were 4–0 against the Chiefs in the playoffs and had given them plenty of trouble in the past. However, the Chiefs continued their stellar season with an impressive victory over the Colts, as the Chiefs won 31–13 and did not falter down the stretch like some of their previous postseason games in the Andy Reid era. This win came on a combination of four rushing touchdowns and a defense that only allowed six points, as the other seven came on a blocked punt that was recovered for a touchdown. With this victory, the Chiefs were able to host the AFC Championship Game for the first time in team history, and this was the first time ever that Kansas City had hosted a conference championship or a championship game in the AFL or NFL. After the New England Patriots beat the Los Angeles Chargers, the matchup was set: Patriots at Chiefs for the AFC Championship.

In the AFC Championship Game, the Chiefs started out slow and were shut out in the first half, and the Patriots were leading 14–0. By the fourth quarter, however, the Chiefs were winning 21–17. The teams traded blows during the fourth quarter, where the two teams combined to score 38 points in the quarter. Down 31–28 with one timeout and only 39 seconds to go, the Chiefs were able to drive down the field and kick a field goal to send the game into overtime. However, the Chiefs did not win the coin toss and the Patriots received the ball to begin overtime. The Chiefs were able to get the Patriots into three 3rd down and 10 to go situations, however the Patriots converted on all of them and eventually scored a touchdown to win the game by a score of 37–31. It was the third consecutive year where the Chiefs had lost a playoff game by six points or less.

The 2018 Chiefs also became the first team in NFL history to score at least 26 points in all of their games.

=== 2019: First Super Bowl in 50 years ===
Heading into the 2019 offseason, the Chiefs had many key players that they cut, traded, or allowed to become free agents. Some of these players included Dee Ford (traded after being franchise tagged), Mitch Morse, Chris Conley, Allen Bailey, Justin Houston, Eric Berry, and more. The Chiefs also had to find a new defensive coordinator after the firing of Bob Sutton following the collapse against New England in the AFC Championship game. The Chiefs would hire Steve Spagnuolo as their defensive coordinator on January 24, 2019.

Kansas City enjoyed a 4–0 start before losing to the Indianapolis Colts and Houston Texans. Patrick Mahomes suffered a dislocated kneecap during the next game, a win over the rival Denver Broncos, missing the next two weeks. After an upset loss to the Tennessee Titans, the Chiefs would win their remaining games, including a Monday night game against the Los Angeles Chargers in Mexico City and a 23–16 win over the defending Super Bowl champions New England Patriots in Foxboro, to finish the season at 12–4, clinching the AFC West title and a first-round bye in the playoffs for the second consecutive season.

In the Divisional round of the playoffs, Kansas City faced a rematch against the Houston Texans, falling behind 24–0 in the second quarter. However, the Chiefs then scored 41 unanswered points, including 28 in the second quarter, on the way to crushing the Texans 51–31. It was the first time in NFL postseason history that a team came back from a deficit of 20 or more points to win by 20 or more points. The Chiefs then faced a rematch against the Tennessee Titans in the AFC Championship game. They once again found themselves behind early as Tennessee took a 10–0 lead, but Kansas City took the lead by halftime, thanks to two passing touchdowns from Mahomes to Tyreek Hill and a Mahomes touchdown run. The Chiefs ultimately won 35–24, avenging another regular season loss and clinching their first Super Bowl appearance in 50 years.

In Super Bowl LIV, the Chiefs were down 20–10 in the 4th quarter only to come back and win 31–20 to get their first Super Bowl in 50 years and second Super Bowl overall. Patrick Mahomes was named Super Bowl MVP for his 285-yard, 2-TD performance.

=== 2020: Return to the Super Bowl ===
After their huge 2019 campaign, the Chiefs were ready to build up. However, running back Damien Williams opted out of playing the 2020 season due to the COVID-19 pandemic. This did not matter much, however, as the Chiefs used their first-round draft pick on star LSU running back Clyde Edwards-Helaire.

The 2020 season was a dominant season for the Chiefs, as they managed to enjoy their fourth straight 4–0 start, an NFL record. They also managed to break the franchise record for longest winning streak in history (previously held by the 2015 Chiefs) at 12 after a 34–20 week 3 win at Baltimore. Their first loss came at the hands of the Las Vegas Raiders, who beat them in Kansas City for the first time since the Chiefs' miserable 2012 season; the loss ended the Chiefs' franchise-record winning streak at 13. The Chiefs then went on to win ten straight games on their way to a league-high and franchise-best 14–2 record.

In the postseason, the Chiefs started off against the Cleveland Browns, who had just acquired their first playoff win in a quarter-century. The Chiefs held on to a 19–3 lead before Patrick Mahomes went down with a minor concussion. After that, the Browns attempted a comeback, trailing 22–17 in the final minutes. That's when Chiefs backup quarterback Chad Henne hit Tyreek Hill perfectly on fourth and inches in one of the gutsiest play calls in NFL history, to seal the victory. In their third straight AFC Championship Game at home (an NFL record), the Chiefs played the Buffalo Bills, who, like the Browns, had also just overcome a quarter-century playoff win drought. Despite trailing 9–0 in the first quarter, the Chiefs would remind fans of 2019 by scoring three straight touchdowns on their way to a thrilling 38–24 victory, to win their second straight Lamar Hunt trophy.

Super Bowl LV against the Tampa Bay Buccaneers was the fifth meeting between Mahomes and Tom Brady. The series was 2–2 heading into the game. What was supposed to be a battle for the ages instead became a domination. The Chiefs could not get anything going right, not scoring a single touchdown in the game for the first time in Mahomes' career, as the Buccaneers crushed them 31–9. With the loss, the Chiefs were denied a second straight NFL title, which would have ended the streak at 15 for consecutive years without repeat world champions.

=== 2021: Losing at the AFC Championship Game ===
The 2021 season saw the Chiefs have a tough 3–4 start before winning their last 9 out of 10 games to win their 6th straight AFC West title to finish at 12–5 and the #2 seed of the playoffs.

In the postseason, the Chiefs started off against the Pittsburgh Steelers in what turned out to be Ben Roethlisberger's final game as a Steeler, the Chiefs would blow out the Steelers 42–21 in the Wild Card Round. The next week in what turned out to be the greatest divisional playoff game ever played, the Chiefs hosted the Buffalo Bills and with 13 Seconds left in regulation, the Chiefs kicked a 49-yard field goal to send the game into overtime. The Chiefs would win 42–36 in overtime on their first possession in overtime. This win, along with the Cincinnati Bengals upset win over the Tennessee Titans the previous day, the Chiefs hosted a 4th straight AFC Championship Game. In the AFC Championship Game, the Chiefs hosted the Cincinnati Bengals and what started as a dominant performance that lead to a monumental collapse as the Chiefs had a 21–3 at halftime and the Bengals would make a comeback to tie the game at 24–24 and send the game to overtime. The Chiefs won the toss, but on their first possession, Patrick Mahomes threw a long interception by Bengals SS Vonn Bell before the Bengals would win on a game winning field goal, thus denying the Chiefs a 3rd straight Super Bowl appearance, losing to the Bengals 27–24 in overtime. This game would also turn out to be Tyreek Hill's last game as a Chief before eventually trading to the Miami Dolphins the next season.

=== 2022–2023: Back–to–back Super Bowls ===
In 2022, the Chiefs finished with a 14–3 record and #1 seed in the AFC. They defeated the Jacksonville Jaguars and Cincinnati Bengals to make it to Super Bowl LVII, where they beat the Philadelphia Eagles 38–35, winning their franchise's third Super Bowl. In 2023, they finished with an 11–6 record and #3 seed in the AFC. They defeated the Miami Dolphins, Buffalo Bills, and Baltimore Ravens, which was their first AFC Championship game on the road, to reach Super Bowl LVIII, where they faced-off against the San Francisco 49ers for a rematch of Super Bowl LIV. They beat the 49ers 25–22 in overtime, the second game to do so in Super Bowl history. The Chiefs' win made them the first back-to-back Super Bowl champions since the New England Patriots won Super Bowl XXXVIII in 2004 and Super Bowl XXXIX in 2005.

=== 2024: Three–peat bid denied ===
The 2024 season saw the Chiefs start at 9–0 for the first time since 2013. After a Week 14 19–17 win over the Los Angeles Chargers, they won their 9th straight AFC West title. After a Week 17 29–10 win on Christmas Day over the Pittsburgh Steelers, they clinched the AFC's #1 seed and home-field advantage throughout the playoffs. After wins over the Houston Texans and Buffalo Bills, they advanced to their third straight Super Bowl appearance. However, their three–peat was denied as they were crushed by the Philadelphia Eagles 40–22 in Super Bowl LIX.

== Chiefs quarterbacks ==
Throughout the Chiefs' six-decade existence, there have been 12 starting quarterbacks to lead the team. Among the most prolific include Hall of Famers Len Dawson and Joe Montana, as well as quarterbacks like Trent Green.

In the past few decades, the Chiefs have relied on veteran quarterbacks to lead their team. The last quarterback to be drafted by Kansas City that later went on to claim the starting position was Bill Kenney in 1980. Since Kenney's retirement in 1988. the Chiefs never drafted their own quarterback to develop until Brodie Croyle, whom started some games in 2007 and 2008, was drafted in 2006. When head coach Herman Edwards arrived in 2006, he stated that he was looking towards implementing younger players into his gameplan, and he was arguably looking to start at the quarterback position. The Chiefs acquired Matt Cassel in a trade with the New England Patriots in the 2009 offseason after a breakout performance with the Patriots in 2008 in place of the injured Tom Brady. Cassel was widely expected to be the team's franchise quarterback but was released in 2013.

The Chiefs have also had a repeated history of backup quarterbacks that steal the spotlight. Mike Livingston led the Chiefs to the playoffs in their 1969 season after starting quarterback Len Dawson was injured for the majority of the year. Most recently, Rich Gannon took over for the injured Elvis Grbac in the 1997 season, but was revoked of the job in favor of Grbac's return for the playoffs. The Chiefs lost in the playoffs to the eventual Super Bowl champion Denver Broncos. A similar incident occurred in the 2006 season and playoffs when Trent Green and the Chiefs' offense failed to get a first down in the first 42 minutes of the game. Backup quarterback Damon Huard, who led the Chiefs on a 5–2 record in Green's absence, never played a down in the playoff loss to—coincidentally—the eventual Super Bowl champion Indianapolis Colts.

== Head coaches ==
Name	From	To	Record			Championships
Name	From	To	W	L	T	Championships
Hank Stram	December 20, 1959	December 27, 1974	124	76	10	3
Paul Wiggin	January 23, 1975	October 31, 1977	11	24	0	
Tom Bettis †	October 31, 1977	December 19, 1977	1	6	0	
Marv Levy	December 20, 1977	January 4, 1983	31	42	0	
John Mackovic	February 2, 1983	January 8, 1987	30	34	0	
Frank Gansz	January 10, 1987	January 5, 1989	8	22	1	
Marty Schottenheimer	January 24, 1989	January 11, 1999	103	58	1	
Gunther Cunningham	January 22, 1999	January 5, 2001	16	16	0	
Dick Vermeil	January 12, 2001	January 1, 2006	44	36	0	
Herm Edwards	January 9, 2006	January 24, 2009	15	34	0	
Todd Haley	February 6, 2009	December 12, 2011	19	26	0	
Romeo Crennel	December 12, 2011	December 31, 2012	4	15	0	
Andy Reid	January 4, 2013	Present	110	44	0	3

† = Interim head coach
