= Sahil Omar =

Fictitious migrant falsely blamed for several crimes

Sahil Omar is a nonexistent person blamed for several crimes and disasters in the United States.

== History ==
Starting in late 2023, social media users, often on X, misidentified Omar as the attacker in several mass shootings, including the 2023 University of Nevada, Las Vegas shooting and the 2024 Kansas City parade shooting. He was also falsely linked to several non-criminal events, such as the explosion at the Rainbow Bridge border crossing in Niagara Falls, New York, and an explosion in Fort Worth, Texas, that injured 21 people.

Omar is often identified as a 44-year-old migrant. AFP has linked this misinformation to efforts to blame immigrants for crime and criticize President Joe Biden for his perceived lack of action on illegal immigration.

== See also ==
- Sam Hyde, also linked falsely to mass shootings
- Emmanuel Goldstein, a fictional character from the novel Nineteen Eighty-Four and the principle scapegoat of the novel's authoritarian government
