= Jim Barton (American football) =

American football player (1934–2013)

No. 50, 52
- Position: Center

Personal information
- Born: June 12, 1934; Finleyville, Pennsylvania
- Died: June 24, 2013 (aged 79)

Career information
- College: Marshall
- NFL draft: 1960: undrafted

Career history
- Dallas Texans (1960); Denver Broncos (1961–1962)

Career NFL statistics
- Games played: 42
- Games started: 14
- Stats at Pro Football Reference

James Edward Barton (June 12, 1934 – June 24, 2013) was an American Football League (AFL) center. He graduated from Wahama Senior High School in Mason, West Virginia in 1952, and went on to play college football and basketball at Marshall University. He then played professionally in the AFL for the Dallas Texans (1960) and the Denver Broncos (1961–1962).

== See also ==
- List of American Football League players
