= Snake Saturday =

Annual parade and festival in North Kansas City, Missouri

- Status: Active
- Date: Saturday before March 17
- Frequency: Annually
- Locations: North Kansas City, Missouri, U.S.
- Inaugurated: March 12, 1983
- Founders: Mickey Finn and Bill Grigsby
- Most recent: March 15, 2025
- Website: snakesaturday.com

Snake Saturday is an annual event held in North Kansas City, Missouri, each year on the Saturday before Saint Patrick's Day. It consists of a family-friendly parade and festival that also serve as a charity fundraiser.

The event is named after the legend of Saint Patrick banishing snakes from 5th-century Ireland.

== History ==
Snake Saturday began in 1983 as a promotion for the Rodeway Inn in Kansas City with a parade in the hotel's parking lot, allowing guests to watch from their rooms. It was founded by Mickey Finn and Bill Grigsby. The parade was composed of four floats, and temperatures were cold.

The event has been held annually since. As of March 2023, Snake Saturday has awarded cash prizes totaling approximately $1.8 million to charity participants. It is also estimated that local businesses gain the equivalent of two to three weeks of sales during the event.

Finn died on March 1, 2014, and Grigsby died of prostate cancer on February 26, 2011. Snake Saturday has continued without them while honoring their visions for the event. For example, the theme for the fortieth anniversary of the event in 2024 was "Mickey Finn's Irish Dream".

Following the events of the Kansas City Union Station shooting in February 2024, additional scrutiny was placed on the Snake Saturday organizers ahead of the event to tighten security. They responded by updating their safety plan, such as by including SWAT-trained officers and advising the public to report potential concerns to the "hundreds of officers on the streets" during the event.

== Activities ==
As its founders intended, Snake Saturday is family-friendly, pet-friendly, and community-driven.

=== Parade ===
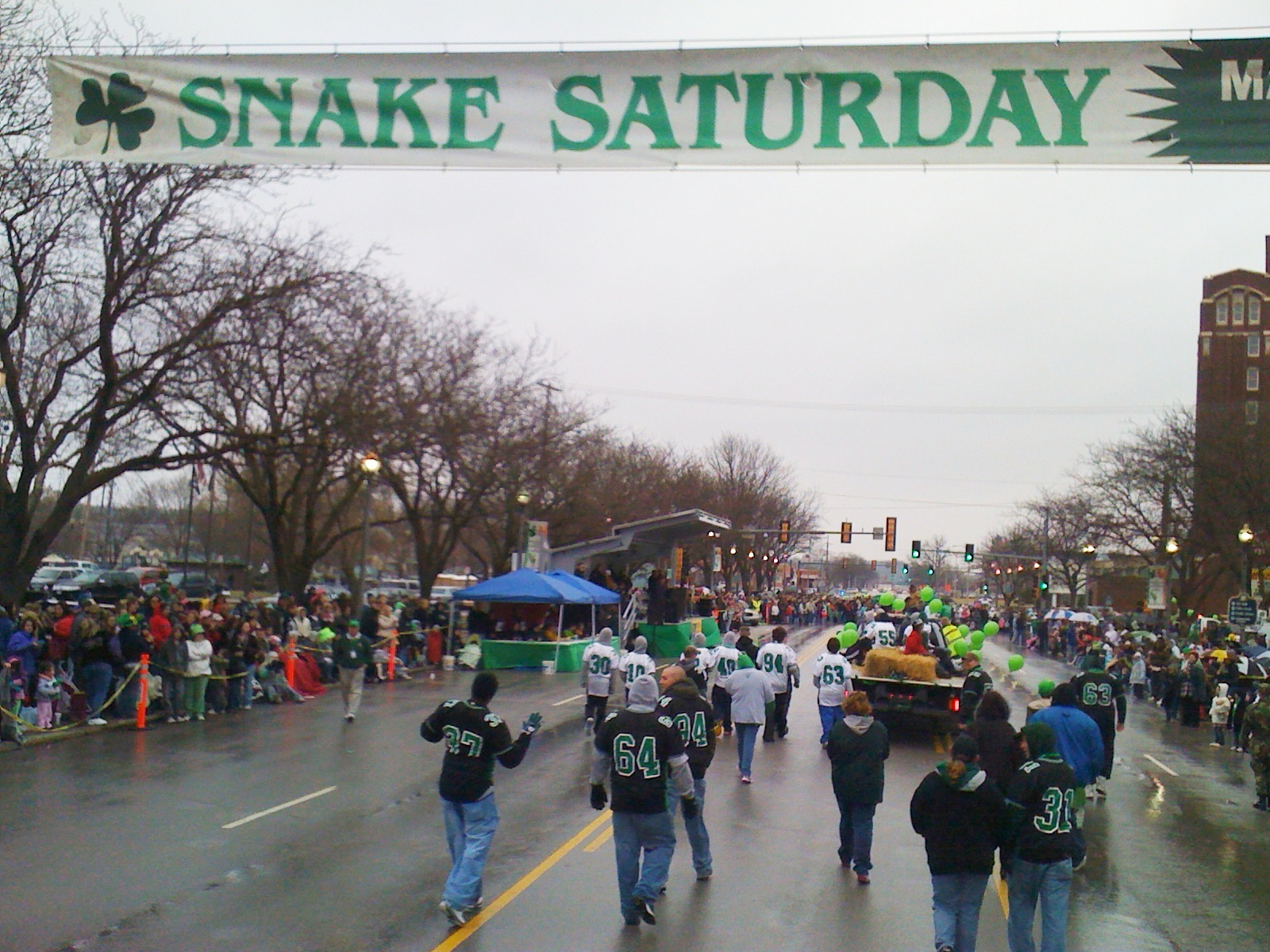
The 2010 parade as seen from a float

The parade organizers have ensured the event remains appropriate and safe for children by making it alcohol-free, disallowing anything thrown from floats, and conducting a safety meeting with all entrants before the parade.

501(c)(3) organizations, families, youth groups, performing artists, bands, local schools, commercial businesses, motorcycle groups, automotive groups, radio/news stations, and other organizations are encouraged to enter the parade. Non-profit organizations are required to be community-oriented, non-discriminatory, and not targeted to a specific group. As of 2024, entry fees range from $50 to $350 depending on the type of group.

=== Festival ===
A festival is held on the day of the parade and generally features activities for children, carnival rides, a car show, food concessions, arts and crafts stations, and live stage entertainment. The festival organizers decided not to sell beer on-site in line with their family-oriented theme.

=== Charity cook-off ===
The organizers of Snake Saturday run a charity cooking competition the day before the parade. Participating charities compete for cash prizes and are given a Kansas City strip steak and a take-out box. Their submissions are judged based on taste, tenderness, presentation, and decoration of the box in line with the event's annual theme.
