= 2024 Kansas City parade shooting =

Mass shooting in Missouri, U.S.

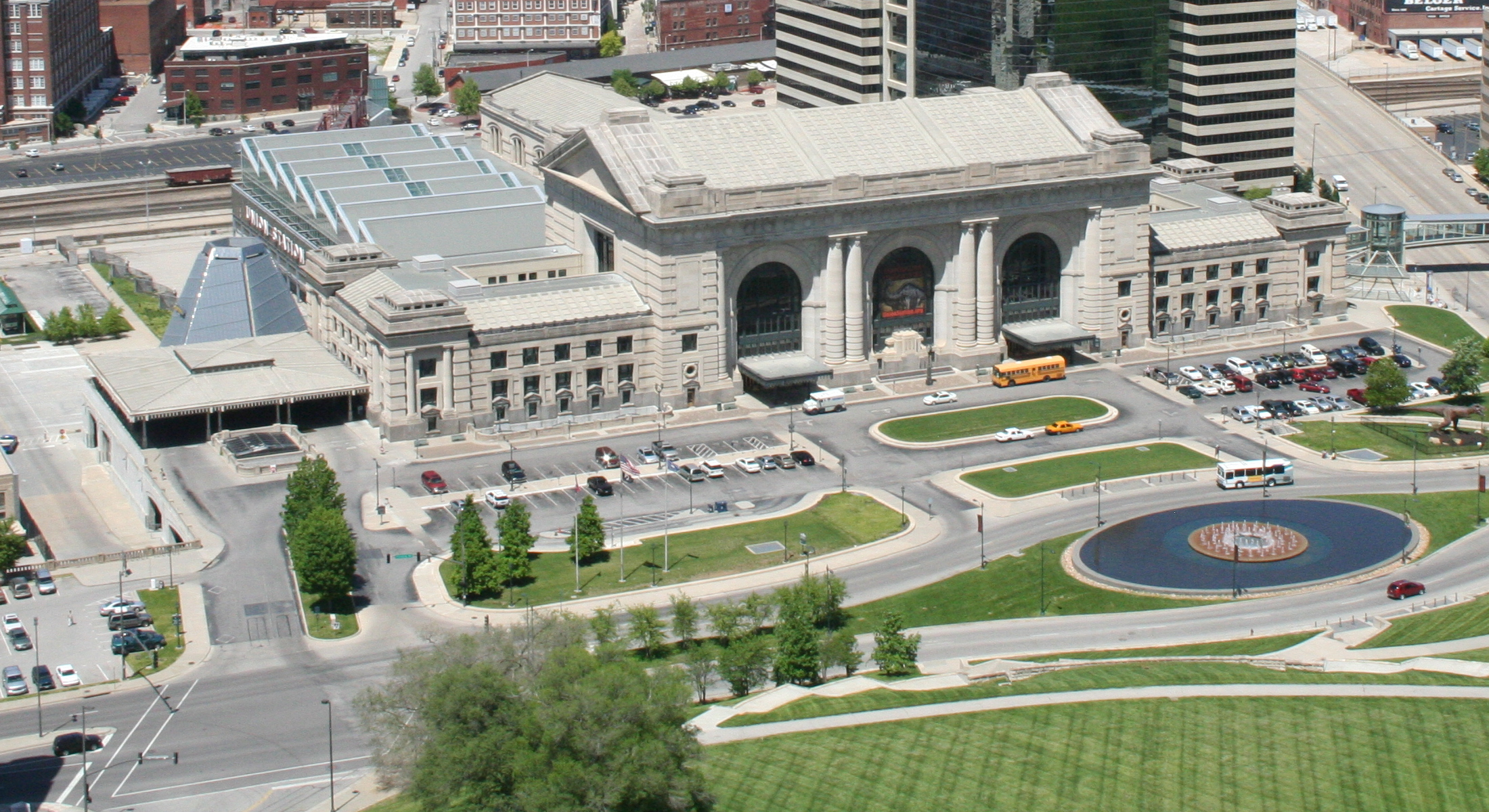
- Kansas City Union Station photographed in 2010; the shooting took place near the intersection on the bottom left.
- Location: 39.08355°N 94.58618°W; Kansas City Union Station; Kansas City, Missouri, U.S.
- Date: February 14, 2024; 2 years ago c. 2:00 p.m. (CST)
- Attack type: Mass shooting
- Weapon: Handguns
- Deaths: 1
- Injuries: 40 (22 by gunshot, 18 by other circumstances including at least one of the suspects)
- Accused: Two adults; Two juveniles
- Charges: Two adults: Second-degree murder; Armed criminal action (2 counts); Unlawful use of a weapon; One adult: Unlawful possession of a firearm (Note: One adult was arrested at the scene in relation to the shooting, but not connected to it.); Three adults: Conspiracy to traffic firearms; Engaging in firearm sales without a license; Making a false statement (14 counts); (Note: Three adults were arrested in relation to the weapons used during the shooting, but did not participate in the shooting.) Juveniles: Firearm offenses and resisting arrest

On February 14, 2024, 23 people were shot in a mass shooting at the west side of Union Station in Kansas City, Missouri, United States. One person was killed and twenty-two others were wounded by gunshots, including eleven children. The shooting followed a Super Bowl LVIII victory parade for the Kansas City Chiefs.

Two adults and two juveniles were charged in connection with the shooting, with the adults being charged with murder.

== Background ==
On February 11, 2024, the Kansas City Chiefs won Super Bowl LVIII. On February 14, a victory parade and rally were held with a municipal budget of almost US$1 million. The parade ran 2 miles (3.2 km) from Sixth Street to Union Station, culminating with the team and dignitaries giving speeches at the rally in front of the building. More than 600 Kansas City Police Department officers and 200 other officers were staffed around the events. The crowd was estimated at one million, including many families. Kansas City metropolitan area schools canceled classes for the parade.

== Shooting ==
The shooting occurred immediately after the parade rally, about 2 p.m. CST. A reporter at the rally reported loud pops as confetti began to fall. The Chiefs and staff were inside Union Station. Some witnesses claimed they had heard an altercation before the shooting; one reported hearing a woman telling someone else, "Not now, this isn't the place." One of the suspected shooters was chased and tackled by attendees.

Some of the Chiefs players sheltered in place with attendees—Trey Smith and James Winchester in a small closet—and helped maintain calm until evacuation. Another attendee who sheltered inside Union Station recalled being told by a security guard to hop the fence, and saw head coach Andy Reid and players calming down panicked children. Chiefs players and their families who had attended the parade were escorted from the area and taken back to Arrowhead Stadium shortly after the shooting.

== Victims ==
Twenty-three people were shot, injuring 22 and killing Lisa Lopez-Galvan, a Tejano DJ for local radio station KKFI, who died at the scene.

Five hospitals received 38 patients, of whom 21 had gunshot wounds. Children's Mercy Hospital received 11 child victims aged between 6 and 15 years old, nine of whom had been shot.

The Kansas City Star also reported that 18 other victims arrived at local hospitals in the aftermath of the shooting with non-gunshot-related injuries.

Some of the bullets and shrapnel embedded in the victims might not be able to be removed.

== Suspects ==
Three juvenile suspects were initially apprehended, two of whom were armed.

One juvenile was released after it was determined they were not involved with the shooting. The other two remained in custody, and on February 16, were charged with gun-related crimes and resisting arrest, with additional charges expected.

On February 16, a charge for unlawful possession was brought against a man who had picked up a gun from the ground around the time of the shooting. The person was not considered to be involved in the shooting by law enforcement.

On February 20, police apprehended two men, who were separate from the two unidentified juveniles. Both men were charged with second-degree murder in connection of the shooting.

In mid-March, three adults were charged in connection with some of the guns used in the shooting. The three were charged with multiple counts of false statements, straw purchases of firearms, and firearms trafficking. Dominic Miller, one of the suspects in the Kansas City Chiefs parade shooting, has been indicted on four felony charges. This comes almost three months after Lyndell Mays, another alleged shooter in the Kansas City incident, was also indicted on felony charges.

In December 2024, Ronnel Dewayne Williams Jr. was sentenced in U.S. District Court to five years of probation in connection to the shooting. In March 2026, Dominic Miller's second-degree murder charge was dropped due to Missouri's stand-your-ground law. That same month, he pleaded guilty to unlawful use of a weapon and was sentenced to two years in prison. In April 2026, a second degree murder charge was dropped against another suspect, Terry Young, who ended up pleading guilty to unlawful use of weapon and was sentenced to two years in prison.

== Investigation ==
Kansas City police coordinated with the FBI and the Bureau of Alcohol, Tobacco, Firearms and Explosives to collect physical and digital evidence and interview witnesses and victims. An FBI online portal was created for anyone to submit digital evidence.

Kansas City Police Chief Stacey Graves stated during a news conference concerning the preliminary investigative findings that the shooting appeared to have been a "dispute between several people that ended in gunfire", and that there is no indication of a "nexus to terrorism or homegrown violent extremism".

An investigation initially suggested that the bullet that struck and killed Lopez-Galvan was fired from the gun of accused shooter Dominic Miller. However, authorities later stated that the evidence was inconclusive and they could not confirm whether Miller had fired the fatal shot.

== Reactions ==
Missouri Governor Mike Parson attended the station and posted on social media, "State law enforcement personnel are assisting local authorities in response efforts." Missouri legislator and 2024 Anti-Crime Committee member Manny Abarca IV was present during the shooting, and stated his view that Lopez-Galvan and other victims of gun violence in the US are never forgotten. President Joe Biden was briefed, and Mayor Quinton Lucas received calls from the White House offering assistance in the investigation. The House of Representatives held a moment of silence, led by Kansas City area House congressional members Emanuel Cleaver, Sharice Davids, and Mark Alford. The Chiefs and the NFL expressed condolences. Other local teams such as the Kansas City Royals and Kansas City Current also expressed condolences.

The Chiefs launched a fund called KC Strong in partnership with United Way of Greater Kansas City, with money raised going to support victims of the shooting, their families and first responders, as well towards violence prevention and mental health support services. The Chiefs, the Hunt Family Foundation and the NFL donated $200,000 to the fund. Chiefs quarterback Patrick Mahomes and his wife Brittany Mahomes donated $50,000 to the fund, and visited victims of the shooting in hospital. Chiefs tight end Travis Kelce and singer-songwriter Taylor Swift, whose relationship drew media attention during the season, each donated $100,000 to GoFundMe pages set up by the Reyes family and the family of Lopez-Galvan, respectively. Chiefs kicker Harrison Butker, after finding out that Lopez-Galvan was a fan of his, gave her family one of his jerseys to bury her in.

Parents of shooting victims of the Parkland high school shooting on February 14, 2018, six years prior, expressed their dismay and lack of surprise due to lax gun laws, while discussing their own shooting anniversary. Kostas Moros, an attorney representing the California Rifle & Pistol Association, argued that calls for gun control were misplaced, noting that at least two of the suspects were juveniles who cannot legally purchase or carry firearms.

Social media users, including Missouri elected officials, spread misinformation about the identity of a suspect, falsely claiming that a 44-year-old migrant named "Sahil Omar" was the shooter. Posts published online used a picture of Denton Loudermill, who was briefly held during the shooting, claiming it was "Omar." Loudermill received death threats due to the false claims and attempted to clear his name through defamation lawsuits against Denny Hoskins, Rick Brattin, and Nick Schroer. He died in 2025.

The shooting prompted concerns surrounding security at future parades in the area, namely Kansas City's Saint Patrick's Day parade and North Kansas City's Snake Saturday parade.
