= R. B. Nunnery =

American football player (1933–1988)

No. 68
- Position: Offensive tackle

Personal information
- Born: December 28, 1933; McComb, Mississippi, U.S.
- Died: May 18, 1988 (aged 54); Metairie, Louisiana, U.S.
- Listed height: 6 ft 4 in (1.93 m)
- Listed weight: 275 lb (125 kg)

Career information
- High school: Summit (MS)
- College: LSU
- NFL draft: 1956: 12th round, 134th overall pick

Career history
- Detroit Lions (1956)*; Philadelphia Eagles (1957)*; Dallas Texans (1960); Los Angeles Rams (1962)*
- * Offseason or practice squad member only

Career AFL statistics
- Games played: 6
- Stats at Pro Football Reference

Robert Brock Nunnery (December 28, 1933 – May 18, 1988) was an American professional football tackle who played one season with the Dallas Texans of the American Football League (AFL). He was selected by the Detroit Lions in the twelfth round of the 1956 NFL draft after playing college football at Louisiana State University.

== Early life and college ==
Robert Brock Nunnery was born on December 28, 1933, in McComb, Mississippi. He attended Summit High School in Summit, Mississippi.

Nunnery first played college football at Southwest Mississippi Junior College. He was later inducted into the Southwest Mississippi Junior College Hall of Fame. He was a two-year letterman for the LSU Tigers of Louisiana State University from 1954 to 1955. Nunnery majored in physical education at LSU.

== Professional career ==
Nunnery was selected by the Detroit Lions in the 12th round, with the 134th overall pick, of the 1956 NFL draft. He was released on September 18, 1956.

Nunnery signed with the Philadelphia Eagles of the NFL on May 6, 1957, but was released later that year.

Nunnery was signed by the Dallas Texans of the American Football League in 1960. He played in six games for the Texans during the 1960 season. He became a free agent after the season.

Nunnery signed with the NFL's Los Angeles Rams in 1962. He was released later in 1962.

== Personal life ==
Nunnery ran Nunnery's Men's Wear in McComb for 25 years. He died of a heart attack on May 18, 1988, at Ochsner Foundation Hospital in Metairie, Louisiana.
