= Bill Grigsby =

American sportscaster (1922–2011)

- Born: February 13, 1922; Wellsville, Kansas, U.S.
- Died: February 26, 2011 (aged 89); Parkville, Missouri, U.S.
- Education: University of Kansas
- Occupation: Sportscaster
- Spouse: Frances (Married 62 years)
- Children: Three sons, two daughters.

William W. Grigsby (February 13, 1922 – February 26, 2011) was an American sportscaster. Grigsby was best known for his work with the Kansas City Chiefs. He was honored as a member of the Missouri Sports Hall of Fame.

== Personal life ==
Bill Grigsby was born in Wellsville, Kansas, in 1922, the youngest of three sons of Harry Ludwell Grigsby and Elanore Amelia Grigsby. His father was a geologist, frequently unemployed during the Great Depression so the family moved to Lawrence, Kansas, when Bill was in third grade. After graduating from the University of Kansas, Grigsby served three years in the United States Army Air Forces (USAAF) during World War II as a cryptographer. He married wife Frances in 1949 and they would have five children: three sons and two daughters.

In 1983, Grigsby co-founded Snake Saturday, an annual parade in North Kansas City, with Mickey Finn.

== Professional career ==
Following his discharge from the USAAF Grigsby took a job with the Joplin Globe newspaper in Joplin, Missouri, advancing from copy boy to sports reporter. It was while in Joplin he began his first foray into broadcasting, serving as play-by-play voice of the Joplin Miners minor-league baseball team.

In 1957 Grigsby returned to his alma mater to broadcast Kansas Jayhawks football and basketball games. While at KU, Grigsby broadcast the first nationally-televised NCAA Final Four game as Kansas lost to North Carolina in triple overtime. Bill Grigsby began his long association with the Kansas City sports scene in 1959 when he was hired as part of the Kansas City Athletics broadcasting team. The Kansas City Chiefs hired Grigsby in 1963 and he would remain a fixture of game broadcasts until his retirement in 2009. His trademark, no matter the weather, "It's a bea-youuu-tiful day for Chiefs football" endeared him to generations of Chiefs fans.

Other work included broadcast and management duties with the Kansas City Scouts of the NHL, local commercial voiceovers, and even a brief stint as a wrestling promoter. Grigsby published the first of two books, Grigs! A beauuutiful Life in 2004, followed by Don't Spit in the Wastebasket, a collection of sports memories, in 2005. Grigsby also contributed a weekly general sports column up to the time of his death for "The Parkville Luminary" newspaper.

== Failing health ==
Grigsby suffered a heart attack in October 2003 which caused him to miss several broadcasts. It was also during that decade he was diagnosed with prostate cancer. When the Chiefs honored Grigsby with a special ceremony in September 2010, Grigsby was seen in a wheelchair. Bill Grigsby died of prostate cancer on February 26, 2011, at the age of 89.

== Honors ==
- Grigsby was inducted into the Missouri Sports Hall of Fame in 1994.
- Inducted into the National Association of Intercollegiate Athletics (NAIA) Hall of Fame in 1991.
- Grigsby Field, a community baseball field in Parkville, Missouri, was named in his honor in 2002.
- In 2007, a life-size statue of Bill Grigsby was erected at the National Golf Club of Kansas City in Parkville. It was relocated to downtown Parkville in 2017, Grigsby's residence since 1974.
