= Don Rossi =

American sports executive (1918–1990)

Donald A. Rossi (June 2, 1918 – March 11, 1990) was the founding general manager of the Dallas Texans (now the Kansas City Chiefs) and was later president of the National Golf Foundation and the executive director of the Golf Course Builders Association of America.

Rossi was a quarterback at Michigan State University in the 1938 and 1939 seasons. He also boxed at the school.

He was a National Football League official when he became the Texans first general manager under Lamar Hunt. After the Texans were 3–4 in their inaugural season under Rossi, he was fired on November 1, 1960, and was replaced by longtime Hunt assistant Jack Steadman. The Chiefs were 5–2 under Steadman completing the first season at 8–6 and having an average attendance of 24,500 (the highest of any team in the first season of the newly created American Football League. Rossi's most lasting contribution to the team was the hiring of University of Miami coach Hank Stram.

Rossi was president of the National Golf Foundation from 1970 to 1983 and then was executive director of the National Association of Public Golf Courses (now the National Golf Course Owners Association) from its founding as a NGF spin off in 1984 until 1990. The Golf Builders Association of America now gives the Don A. Rossi Award to "honor individuals who have made significant contributions to the game of golf and its growth, and who have inspired others."
