= Cotton Davidson =

American football player (1931–2022)

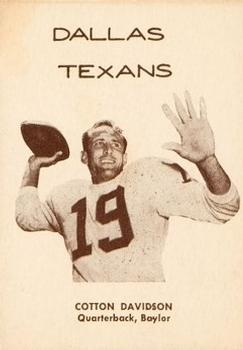

No. 19, 18, 81
- Positions: Quarterback, punter

Personal information
- Born: November 30, 1931; Gatesville, Texas, U.S.
- Died: December 23, 2022 (aged 91); Waco, Texas, U.S.
- Listed height: 6 ft 1 in (1.85 m)
- Listed weight: 182 lb (83 kg)

Career information
- High school: Gatesville
- College: Baylor (1950–1953)
- NFL draft: 1954: 1st round, 5th overall pick

Career history
- Baltimore Colts (1954, 1957); Calgary Stampeders (1958); Dallas Texans (1960–1962); Oakland Raiders (1962–1968)

Awards and highlights
- 2× AFL All-Star (1961, 1963); 2× AFL champion (1962, 1967); 1961 AFL All-Star Game MVP; Second-team All-SWC (1953)

Career NFL/AFL statistics
- Passing attempts: 1,752
- Passing completions: 770
- Completion percentage: 43.9%
- TD–INT: 73–108
- Passing yards: 11,760
- Passer rating: 54.9
- Punts: 280
- Punting yards: 10,679
- Punting average: 38.1
- Stats at Pro Football Reference

Francis Marion "Cotton" Davidson (November 30, 1931 – December 23, 2022) was an American football quarterback and punter in the National Football League (NFL) and American Football League (AFL).

Davidson attended Baylor University, and played professionally for the NFL's Baltimore Colts (1954, 1957), and the AFL's Dallas Texans (1960–1962) and Oakland Raiders (1962–1968).

Davidson has the record for the lowest career completion percentage in NFL history, minimum 1500 passing attempts, at 43.9%.

== Professional career ==
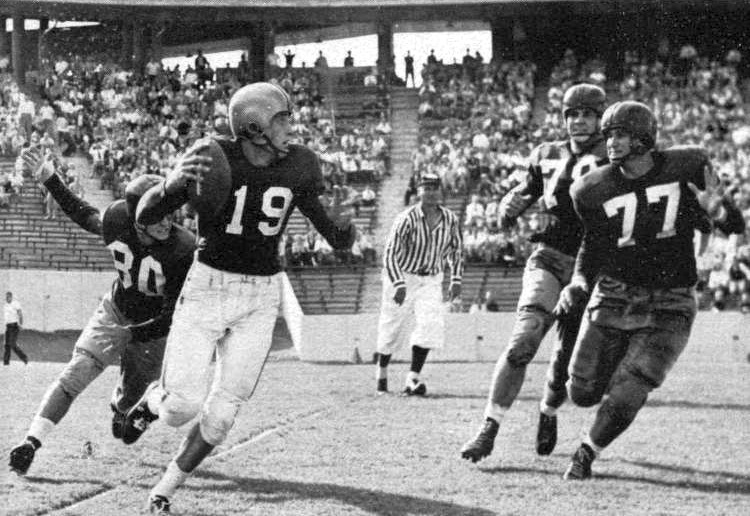
Davidson (#19) as quarterback for Baylor against Houston in 1952.

Davidson was selected in the first round of the 1954 NFL draft by the Baltimore Colts. In addition to playing quarterback, he also was a placekicker and punter. An original Dallas Texan, Davidson was the first starting quarterback for the franchise.

After the 1954 NFL season, Davidson received word that he had been drafted by the U.S. Army. He served in the Army for two years and did not take part in the 1955 NFL season or the 1956 NFL season. By the time Davidson returned to the Colts for the 1957 NFL Season, Johnny Unitas was the team's starting quarterback.

While in the military, Davidson played quarterback for the Fort Bliss Falcons from 1955 to 1957. A game between the Fort Bliss Falcons and the Cannonneers of Fort Sill, Oklahoma, was played for a trophy called "The Little Brown Dud." The Cannoneers won the game and took home the Little Brown Dud. Cotton was awarded All-Army Quarterback in 1955.

After the 1962 season opener, he was traded to the Oakland Raiders for the first overall selection in the 1963 American Football League draft. Just two weeks later, Davidson started at quarterback in his first game with the Raiders. Playing against his former team, he threw for 248 yards and rushed for a touchdown in a 26–16 loss to the Texans.

The high moments of his career were being selected to the American Football League All-Star Game twice: in 1961 and in 1963. He was honored as the MVP of the 1961 AFL All-Star Game while with the Texans.

Davidson finished with an all-time record of 19–33–1 as a starter.

== NFL/AFL career statistics ==
Legend
	Won the AFL championship
**Bold**	Career high

Year	Team	Games			Passing									Rushing					Sacks	
Year	Team	GP	GS	Record	Cmp	Att	Pct	Yds	Y/A	Lng	TD	Int	Rtg	Att	Yds	Avg	Lng	TD	Sck	Yds
1954	BAL	12	1	0-1	28	64	43.8	309	4.8	29	0	5	26.1	11	31	2.8	15	0	-	14
1957	BAL	12	0	0-0	0	2	0.0	0	0.0	0	0	1	0.0	0	0	0.0	0	0	0	0
1960	DTX	14	12	6-6	**179**	**379**	47.2	2,474	6.5	74	15	16	64.2	14	36	2.6	13	1	17	158
1961	DTX	14	12	5-7	151	330	45.8	2,445	7.4	71	17	**23**	59.2	21	123	**5.9**	**40**	1	16	132
1962	DTX	1	0	0-0	0	0	0.0	0	0.0	0	0	0	0.0	0	0	0.0	0	0	0	0
1962	OAK	13	12	1-11	119	321	37.1	1,977	6.2	**90**	7	**23**	36.1	25	54	2.2	19	3	23	212
1963	OAK	14	5	2-3	77	194	39.7	1,276	6.6	73	11	10	60.0	23	133	5.8	18	**4**	20	149
1964	OAK	14	7	4-2-1	155	320	48.4	**2,497**	7.8	60	**21**	19	72.1	**29**	**167**	5.8	33	2	**29**	**248**
1965	OAK	2	0	0-0	1	1	**100.0**	8	**8.0**	8	0	0	**100.0**	0	0	0.0	0	0	0	0
1966	OAK	14	4	1-3	59	139	42.4	770	5.5	51	2	11	32.4	6	-11	-1.8	5	0	5	32
1968	OAK	1	0	0-0	1	2	50.0	4	2.0	4	0	0	56.2	0	0	0.0	0	0	0	0
Career		111	53	19-33-1	770	1,752	43.9	11,760	6.7	90	73	108	54.9	129	533	4.1	40	11	110	945

== Personal life and death ==
Davidson died on December 23, 2022, at the age of 91 in Waco, Texas.

== See also ==
- List of American Football League players
