= 1960 Los Angeles Chargers season =

Inaugural season for the franchise in Los Angeles

- Owner: Barron Hilton
- General manager: Frank Leahy
- Head coach: Sid Gillman
- Home stadium: Los Angeles Memorial Coliseum

Results
- Record: 10–4
- Division place: 1st Western Division
- Playoffs: Lost AFL Championship (at Oilers) 16–24
- All-AFL: 4: CB Dick Harris; QB Jack Kemp; RB Paul Lowe; T Ron Mix

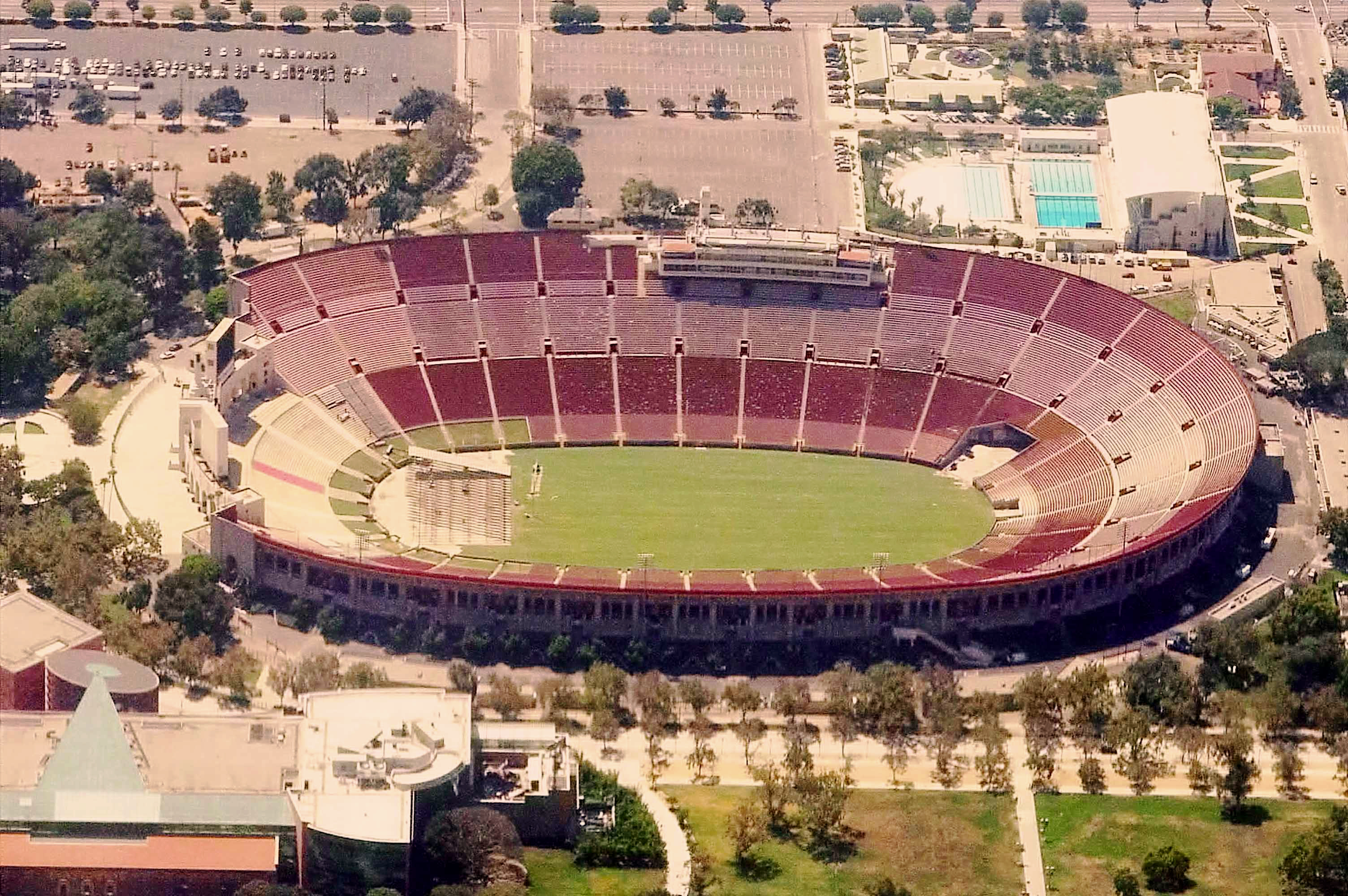
The Los Angeles Memorial Coliseum was home to the Chargers during their inaugural season.

The 1960 Los Angeles Chargers season was the team's inaugural season and also the inaugural season of the American Football League (AFL). Head coach Sid Gillman led the Chargers to the AFL Western Division title with a 10–4 record, winning eight games out of nine after a 2–3 start, and qualifying to play the Houston Oilers in the AFL championship game.

The Chargers had the right to host the championship game at their home venue, the Los Angeles Memorial Coliseum. However, as the team's attendance for home games was falling below 10,000, league and television officials feared showing empty seats in the 100,000+ seat Coliseum, and they persuaded the Chargers to give up the advantage. The game was moved to Houston's Jeppesen Stadium. The teams had split their two games in the regular season, with the home teams winning, and the host Oilers were 6½-point favorites to win the title. Down by a point after three quarters, the Chargers gave up an 88-yard touchdown in the fourth quarter and lost, 24–16.

The Chargers' poor attendance figures, due in part to heavy competition from the Los Angeles Rams, soon led to speculation that they might leave Los Angeles. In December, owner Barron Hilton denied that he was planning a move, but in late January he relocated the Chargers down the coast to Balboa Stadium in San Diego for the 1961 season. The team would not return to Los Angeles until 2017 where they would temporarily stay at Dignity Health Sports Park in the suburb of Carson for three seasons until they moved to SoFi Stadium in Inglewood with the Rams in 2020.

== Offseason ==
=== Formation ===
The AFL granted a Los Angeles franchise to Barron Hilton on August 14, 1959; the nickname "Chargers" was announced on October 27. Hilton's first major signing was former Notre Dame coach and administrator Frank Leahy, who became the club's first general manager on October 14 and began the search for a head coach. Leahy also employed Don Klosterman as Director of Personnel, to help sign new players.

=== Coaching staff ===
Bob McBride, a former assistant of Leahy's at Notre Dame, was named the first Chargers head coach on November 19, but McBride changed his mind within 24 hours of the announcement and pulled out. Subsequently, Leahy had several talks with Los Angeles Rams offensive line coach Lou Rymkus about the vacancy, but Rymkus ultimately joined another AFL team, the Houston Oilers.

On December 12, Sid Gillman left the NFL's Los Angeles Rams after five years as their head coach. The Rams had reached the NFL Championship Game in Gillman's first season in charge, but went 2–10 in 1959. After his exit, Gillman considered retiring from football to become a stockbroker, but was soon lured to the AFL when approached by Hilton, signing a three-year contract on January 7, 1960, having been out of work for just 26 days.

Gillman recruited four assistant coaches in the months that followed. Both Joe Madro and Jack Faulkner had been on Gillman's staff with the Rams; they were installed as offensive line and defensive backfield coaches, respectively. Al Davis was serving as the defensive coordinator at the University of Southern California when Gillman called to offer him a post of his choosing. Davis agreed, taking over the offensive ends, as he wanted to be involved with the passing game. The group was completed on February 1 by the addition of Chuck Noll as defensive line coach. Noll had recently concluded a seven-year career with the Cleveland Browns where he had served as both offensive lineman and linebacker. Three of the coaches on this five-man team are now in the Hall of Fame: Gillman, Davis and Noll.

In July 1960, Leahy resigned as general manager due to ill health, and Gillman took over the role on top of his head coaching duties.

=== AFL draft ===
==== First selections ====
The AFL owners met on November 22–23, 1959, for the opening stages of the league's inaugural draft. On the first day, a "territorial draft" was conducted, with each team receiving the rights to one local player. This was intended to increase interest in the new teams. Each player in the territorial draft was agreed upon by all eight owners; the Chargers received Monty Stickles, but the Notre Dame end ultimately signed with the NFL's San Francisco 49ers instead.

The following day, thirty-two more rounds took place, with the intent of giving each team three players in each offensive position. The selections are believed to have been decided by a drawing of lots, though the closed-door nature of the meeting leaves the precise details of the process unknown. A contemporary source lists 11 players as "Charger Choices" and a further 22 as "additional selections".

The rival NFL staged their own draft one week later, beginning a bidding war for the services of players. Including Stickles, eight of the Chargers' initial thirty-three selections played for NFL teams in 1960. Only three were with the Chargers on opening day. Linebacker and punter Paul Maguire, who had played for Al Davis at The Citadel in 1956, agreed to an $8,000 contract with a $1,000 bonus on Christmas Day, while Wisconsin safety Bob Zeman signed on January 12, 1960, following a meeting with Gillman. The acquisition of Charlie Flowers was less straightforward. Flowers signed a contract with the New York Giants but asked them to keep the agreement secret until after the 1960 Sugar Bowl, to maintain his eligibility for the game. Flowers then changed his mind and signed with the Chargers after they offered him more money. The Giants obtained an injunction to temporarily block the fullback from joining his chosen team, but the courts ruled in San Diego's favor on June 23.

As the precise order of selection is unknown, the Chargers' draft is presented here in alphabetical order. The players were listed according to their offensive positions, even if they were primarily defensive players.

1960 Los Angeles Chargers draft - First Selections
Player	Position	College	Notes
Ted Aucreman	End	Indiana	
Bob Bercich	Halfback	Michigan State	179th pick in 1959 NFL draft; signed by Dallas Cowboys
Barney Berlinger	End	Pennsylvania	
Charles Boone	Center	Richmond	
Bobby Boyd *	Quarterback	Oklahoma	119th pick in NFL draft; signed by Baltimore Colts
Byron Bradfute	Tackle	Southern Mississippi	Signed by Dallas Cowboys
Rod Breedlove *	Guard	Maryland	35th pick in NFL draft; signed by Washington Redskins
Tom Budrewicz	Tackle	Brown	140th pick in NFL draft
James Cameron	Center	East Texas State College	
Jack Crouthamel	Halfback	Dartmouth	Traded to Boston Patriots
Pete Davidson	Tackle/Guard	The Citadel	165th pick in NFL draft
Floyd Faucette	Halfback	Georgia Tech	Traded to Houston Oilers
Charlie Flowers	Fullback	Mississippi	142nd pick in NFL draft
Bobby Franklin	Quarterback	Mississippi	127th pick in NFL draft; signed by Cleveland Browns
Don Horn	Fullback	Iowa	
Bob Jeter *	Halfback	Iowa	17th pick in NFL draft; signed by BC Lions
Bill Linder	Tackle	Pittsburgh	
Billy Locklin	Tackle	New Mexico State	Traded to Oakland Raiders
William Lopasky	Guard	West Virginia	
Paul Maguire *	End	The Citadel	
Ed "Wahoo" McDaniel	End	Oklahoma	Traded to Houston Oilers
Charlie Milstead	Quarterback	Texas A&M	160th pick in NFL draft; traded to Houston Oilers
Ed Pitts	Tackle	South Carolina	
Bob Scholtz	Center	Notre Dame	27th pick in NFL draft; signed by Detroit Lions
Ed Serieka	Fullback	Xavier, Ohio	
Russ Sloan	End	Missouri	
John Stolte	Tackle	Kansas State	
Ron Stehouwer	Tackle	Colorado	136th pick in NFL draft; signed by Pittsburgh Steelers
Wayne Stewart	Guard	The Citadel	
Monty Stickles	End	Notre Dame	11th pick in NFL draft; signed by San Francisco 49ers
Andy Stynchula	Tackle	Penn State	28th pick in NFL draft; signed by Washington Redskins
Leonard Wilson	Halfback	Purdue	
Bob Zeman *	Halfback	Wisconsin	179th pick in 1959 NFL draft
Made roster * Made at least one AFL All-Star game or NFL Pro Bowl during career Played in the NFL in 1960

==== Second selections ====
The AFL owners reconvened on December 2, 1959, for a further 20 rounds of picks. The league released no details as to the order of these selections, but the randomized method is believed to have been used again.

None of Los Angeles' 20 selections played for the team in 1960, but George Blair would join them in 1961, after playing for the University of Mississippi in his senior year.

1960 Los Angeles Chargers draft - Second Selections
Player	Position	College	Notes
Jerry Beabout	Tackle / guard	Purdue	
George Blair *	Defensive back	Mississippi	72nd pick in NFL draft; made Chargers' roster in 1961
Frank Brixius	Tackle / guard	Minnesota	
Joe Davis	Tackle / guard	The Citadel	
Bob DeMarco *	Tackle / guard	Dayton	157th pick in NFL draft; signed by St. Louis Cardinals the following year
Bob Hain	Tackle / guard	Iowa	225th pick in NFL draft
Chuck Janssen	Tackle / guard	Tulsa	
Gorden Kelley	End	Georgia	Signed by San Francisco 49ers
Larry Lancaster	Tackle / guard	Georgia	189th pick in NFL draft; claimed by Oakland in allocation draft
Marv Lasater	Halfback	Texas Christian	58th pick in NFL draft
Warren Lashua	End	Whitworth	
Perry McGriff	End	Florida	
Kirk Phares	Tackle / guard	South Carolina	77th pick in NFL draft
Lamar Rawson	Halfback	Auburn	
Ron Ray	Tackle / guard	Howard Payne	125th pick in NFL draft; signed by Hamilton Tiger Cats
Ken Talkington	Quarterback	Texas Tech	
John Talley	Quarterback	Northwestern	
Bob Waters	Halfback	Presbyterian	83rd pick in NFL draft; signed by San Francisco 49ers
Bob Wehking	Center	Florida	130th pick in NFL draft
Larry Womack	Halfback	Colorado State	
Made roster * Made at least one AFL All-Star game or NFL Pro Bowl during career Played in the NFL in 1960

=== Roster building ===
AFL teams were permitted a squad of 35 players going into the opening week of the regular season. The Chargers stocked their initial roster with numerous rookies, along with a smattering of former NFL players.

One of their most successful acquisitions, Ron Mix, had been drafted by the Boston Patriots, but Los Angeles traded for his rights and beat the NFL's Baltimore Colts to his signature. Mix officially became a Charger on December 16, ten days before his last game for USC. He would become the only man to play for the Chargers in all ten AFL seasons, while being named All-AFL at right tackle every year from 1960 to 1968.

Jack Kemp had been cut by three different NFL teams before signing for the Chargers. When Kemp was signed by the Chargers, he was also offered a job with the Hilton hotel chain to improve his job prospects after his playing career ended. Kemp was soon identified as the leading candidate for the starting quarterback role. He would lead the Chargers to the first two AFL title games, and win a further two with the Buffalo Bills.

Once Al Davis had joined Gillman's coaching team, he became instrumental in persuading several players to join the Chargers. Center Don Rogers had been a late cut of the San Francisco 49ers in 1959. He returned to college at South Carolina, and told Davis he had no further interest in playing pro football. Davis persisted with several telephone calls, and gave Rogers $500 to sign a contract, despite Rogers making it clear he had no intention of reporting to training camp. Rogers eventually drove out to Los Angeles to see California, with little expectation of making the team, but won the starting job and stayed with the Chargers for five years. Others signed by Davis included guards Fred Cole and Sam DeLuca. Like Rogers, running back Paul Lowe had been released by the 49ers in 1959. He took a job with the Carte Blanche credit card organization, owned by the Hilton family. The Chargers management discovered that Lowe was working in the mail room and contacted him about playing for them. Lowe won a spot on the team, and stayed with the Chargers until 1968, rushing for nearly 5,000 yards.

In some cases, the Chargers signed key players away from the NFL by offering more money. Tackle Ernie Wright was offered a guaranteed $33,000 over three years; having heard that fellow Ohio State graduate Jim Parker was making less than $8,000 per year with the Baltimore Colts, he considered the offer too good to pass up. Wright would start over 100 games at left tackle for the Chargers.

Some veteran players actively sought out employment in Los Angeles. End Dave Kocourek and defensive end Ron Nery both wanted to return to the U.S. after stints in the Canadian Football League. They contacted the Chargers and were invited to training camp. For less experienced players, open trials were held by Gillman's staff in April. A handful of these hopefuls made it to training camp proper, which began on July 8 at Chapman College in Orange, California. Players came to the camp in three waves, with higher-rated prospects coming in later, and were steadily whittled down to the target of 35 players.

== Personnel ==
=== Staff ===
1960 Los Angeles Chargers staff
Front office: Owner – Barron Hilton; General manager – Sid Gillman; Director of Personnel - Don Klosterman; Head coaches: Head coach – Sid Gillman; Offensive coaches: End coach – Al Davis; Offensive line coach – Joe Madro	Defensive coaches: Defensive backfield coach – Jack Faulkner; Defensive line coach – Chuck Noll

=== Roster ===
1960 Los Angeles Chargers roster
Quarterbacks (QB): 15 Jack Kemp; Running backs (RB): 37 Howie Ferguson; 41 Charlie Flowers; 20 Fred Ford; 23 Paul Lowe; 33 Blanche Martin; Wide receivers (WR): 28 Royce Womble; 88 Don Norton; Tight ends (TE): 87 Howard Clark; 83 Dave Kocourek	Offensive linemen (OL): 69 Al Barry G; 66 Fred Cole G; 68 Orlando Ferrante G; 74 Ron Mix T; 52 Don Rogers C; 72 Sam DeLuca G/T; 75 Ernie Wright T; Defensive linemen (DL): 71 Dick Chorovich DT; 76 Gary Finneran DT/DE; 80 Ron Nery DE; 70 Volney Peters DT; 81 Maury Schleicher DE	Linebackers (LB): 57 Al Bansavage OLB; 54 Ron Botchan OLB; 53 Charlie Brueckman MLB; 56 Emil Karas OLB/MLB; 51 Rommie Loudd OLB/MLB; Defensive backs (DB): 35 Bob Garner CB; 36 Dick Harris CB; 17 Bob Laraba SS/QB; 27 Charlie McNeil CB; 29 Doyle Nix CB; 26 Jim Sears FS/SS; 34 Bob Zeman FS; Special teams (ST): 3 Ben Agajanian K	Reserve: 89 Art Gob DE (IR); 67 Charlie Kempinska G (IR); 84 Paul Maguire (IR); 73 John Stolte T (Military); Rookies in italics

== Preseason ==
The Chargers' first exhibition game was played at home against the Titans, before a crowd of 27,778. Paul Lowe received the opening kickoff, and returned it 105 yards for a touchdown. Jack Kemp rushed for one touchdown and passed for another to Royce Womble, before Bob Laraba wrapped up a 27–7 win with a short run. Five days later, Los Angeles played before a greatly reduced home crowd of 11,491. Howie Ferguson's late touchdown run represented the only points scored by a Charger who would make their regular season roster. Jetstream Smith scored on a 30-yard run, while Bob Reifsnyder contributed three field goals and an extra point; they would spend the 1960 season with the Raiders and Titans, respectively. In week 3, Los Angeles made the short trip to Oakland, where they faced the Raiders. Lowe caught a 43-yard pass from Kemp for his second preseason score, and a pair of Ferguson touchdown runs in the third quarter put the Chargers ahead to stay, 24–17.

After engaging in a controlled scrimmage against the Eagle Rock Athletic Club on August 26, Los Angeles concluded their exhibition schedule at home against Denver, before an attendance of 21,516. Lowe scored one of three Charger touchdowns in the first half, and Bob Zeman's 47-yard interception return had them up by five in the third quarter. Nonetheless, they trailed 30–28 before two late takeaways. Paul Maguire's interception with barely a minute to play offered Los Angeles their first shot at victory, but Ben Donnell missed a 30-yard field goal. Though only seconds remained, Denver had to keep running regular plays, as the quarterback kneel was not yet an established part of the game. Two plays after Donnell's miss, a loose snap was fallen on in the end zone by Charlie Brueckman, winning the game with 14 seconds to play.

Donnell's struggles prompted the Chargers to approach kicking specialist Ben Agajanian, a veteran of both the NFL and AAFC, who signed for them just three days before their regular season opener.

Week	Date	Opponent	Result	Record	Venue	Attendance
1	August 6	New York Titans	W 27–7	1–0	Los Angeles Memorial Coliseum	27,778
2	August 11	Houston Oilers	W 22–13	2–0	Los Angeles Memorial Coliseum	11,491
3	August 19	at Oakland Raiders	W 24–17	3–0	Kezar Stadium	6,521
4	September 2	Denver Broncos	W 36–30	4–0	Los Angeles Memorial Coliseum	21,516

== Regular season ==
=== Overview ===
Quarterback Jack Kemp had struggled to make an impact in the established NFL, but proved a success in the AFL, ranking first in the league with 14.3 yards per completion, and a close second with 3,018 passing yards. He also rushed for eight touchdowns, tied with Paul Lowe for second most in the league. Lowe was used mainly as a kick returner during the first five weeks of the season, but broke out as a runner through the remaining nine, when he gained 817 of his 855 yards. With a further 377 receiving yards, he ranked fourth in the league in total scrimmage yards, and led the team with ten touchdowns rushing and receiving. Fullback Howie Ferguson, a veteran of six seasons in Green Bay, added 438 yards and four touchdowns on the ground, while scoring twice more with receptions. Ralph Anderson led the receiving corps in all categories through the first ten games, with 44 receptions for 614 yards and five touchdowns. He died from complications of diabetes on the eve of the next game, at the age of 24. Dave Kocourek finished with 40 catches for 662 yards and a touchdown.

On defense, the Chargers ranked second of the eight AFL teams against the pass, third against the rush and third overall. Rookie Dick Harris led the team with five interceptions, and ran one of those back for a touchdown. Defensive end Ron Nery was unofficially (Note: The NFL did not keep sack statistics officially until 1982. Members of the Professional Football Researchers Association have largely reconstructed sack data from 1960 onwards based on official gamebooks, but the NFL does not acknowledge pre-1982 sack numbers.) credited with a team-high 4 1/2 quarterback sacks, while defensive tackle Dick Chorovich had 4. The most experienced Charger was kicker Ben Agajanian, whose career had begun in 1945. He was one of only two AFL kickers to make more than half of their field goal attempts, with 13 successes out of 24, while his 46 extra points from 47 tries tied George Blanda for league-best.

=== Schedule ===
Week	Date	Opponent	Result	Record	Venue	Attendance	Game recap
1	September 10	**Dallas Texans**	**W** 21–20	1–0	Los Angeles Memorial Coliseum	17,724	Recap
2	September 18	at Houston Oilers	**L** 28–38	1–1	Jeppesen Stadium	20,156	Recap
3	September 25	at **Dallas Texans**	**L** 0–17	1–2	Cotton Bowl	42,000	Recap
4	October 2	at Buffalo Bills	**W** 24–10	2–2	War Memorial Stadium	15,821	Recap
5	October 8	Boston Patriots	**L** 0–35	2–3	Los Angeles Memorial Coliseum	18,226	Recap
6	October 16	at **Denver Broncos**	**W** 23–19	3–3	Bears Stadium	19,141	Recap
7	Bye						
8	October 28	at Boston Patriots	**W** 45–16	4–3	Boston University Field	13,988	Recap
9	November 4	at New York Titans	**W** 21–7	5–3	Polo Grounds	19,402	Recap
10	November 13	Houston Oilers	**W** 24–21	6–3	Los Angeles Memorial Coliseum	21,805	Recap
11	November 20	Buffalo Bills	**L** 3–32	6–4	Los Angeles Memorial Coliseum	16,161	Recap
12	November 27	**Oakland Raiders**	**W** 52–28	7–4	Los Angeles Memorial Coliseum	15,075	Recap
13	December 4	at **Oakland Raiders**	**W** 41–17	8–4	Candlestick Park	12,061	Recap
14	December 10	**Denver Broncos**	**W** 41–33	9–4	Los Angeles Memorial Coliseum	9,928	Recap
15	December 18	New York Titans	**W** 50–43	10–4	Los Angeles Memorial Coliseum	11,457	Recap
Note: Intra-division opponents are in **bold** text.

=== Game summaries ===
All game reports use the Pro Football Researchers' gamebook archive as a source.

==== Week 1: vs. Dallas Texans ====
Week One: Dallas Texans at Los Angeles Chargers – Game summary

Quarter	1	2	3	4	Total
Texans	6	14	0	0	**20**
Chargers	0	7	0	14	**21**

at Memorial Coliseum, Los Angeles, California

- Date: September 10
- Game weather: 75 °F (23.9 °C), relative humidity 69%, wind 10 mph
- Game attendance: 17,724
- Box score

Game information

**First quarter**

- DAL – Chris Burford 12-yard pass from Cotton Davidson (kick failed), 3:19. Texans 6–0. **Drive: 8 plays, 60 yards.**

**Second quarter**

- DAL – Jack Spikes 1-yard run (Jack Spikes kick), 6:34. Texans 13–0. **Drive: 17 plays, 94 yards.**
- LAC – Ralph Anderson 46-yard pass from Jack Kemp (Ben Agajanian kick), 2:36. Texans 13–7. **Drive: 1 play, 46 yards.**
- DAL – Abner Haynes 17-yard pass from Cotton Davidson (Jack Spikes kick), 0:20. Texans 20–7. **Drive: 12 plays, 80 yards.**

**Third quarter**

- No scoring plays.

**Fourth quarter**

- LAC – Jack Kemp 7-yard run (Ben Agajanian kick), 9:38. Texans 20–14. **Drive: 10 plays, 68 yards.**
- LAC – Howie Ferguson 4-yard pass from Jack Kemp (Ben Agajanian kick), 2:15. Chargers 21–20. **Drive: 14 plays, 90 yards.**

**Top passers**

- DAL – Cotton Davidson – 22/40, 230 yards, 2 TD, INT
- LAC – Jack Kemp – 24/41, 275 yards, 2 TD

**Top rushers**

- DAL – Jack Spikes – 9 rushes, 62 yards, TD
- LAC – Paul Lowe – 8 rushes, 20 yards

**Top receivers**

- DAL – Abner Haynes – 7 receptions, 62 yards, TD
- LAC – Ralph Anderson – 5 receptions, 103 yards, TD

Los Angeles won their first regular season game with a late comeback. Dallas had touchdown drives of 60 and 94 yards either side of a Charger punt, and led 13–0 midway through the 2nd quarter. Later, Dallas had to punt from deep in their own territory, and Los Angeles took over on the Texan 46. They scored their first touchdown on the next play as Jack Kemp faked a handoff and threw a deep pass down the left sideline. Ralph Anderson caught the ball at the five and back-pedaled into the end zone. Dallas responded with an 80-yard touchdown drive, and led 20–7 at the break.

In the 3rd quarter, Los Angeles reached the Dallas eight yard line, but Kemp was sacked on 4th down and goal. They appeared to have been stopped on downs again in the 4th quarter, but Anderson had drawn a pass interference penalty, and the drive continued. Running back Paul Lowe completed a 24-yard pass to Anderson, then Kemp scrambled in from the Dallas 7 yard line, diving across the goal line with 9:38 to play.

Following a Texan three-and-out, the Chargers began the winning drive on their own 10. Penalties were again key. Dallas recovered a fumble in Charger territory, but the turnover was negated by a flag. Kemp then converted a 3rd and 15 with a 16-yard completion to Howard Clark, before Los Angeles reached a 4th and 6 from the Dallas 37 yard line. Again, Kemp's pass was incomplete, but again a pass interference call (this time drawn by Dave Kocourek) saved the drive. Five plays later, it was 3rd and goal from the four yard line, and Kemp found Howie Ferguson in the left flat for the winning score with 2:15 to play. Jimmy Sears stopped Dallas with a 4th-down interception, and the Chargers ran out the clock.

Kemp was 24 of 41 for 275 yards, two touchdowns and no interceptions. Anderson caught 5 passes for 103 yards and a touchdown; Lowe was the leading Charger rusher with just 20 yards.

==== Week 2: at Houston Oilers ====
Week Two: Los Angeles Chargers at Houston Oilers – Game summary

Quarter	1	2	3	4	Total
Chargers	7	7	0	14	**28**
Oilers	14	7	17	0	**38**

at Jeppesen Stadium, Houston, Texas

- Date: September 18
- Game weather: 80 °F (26.7 °C), relative humidity 72%, wind 4 mph
- Game attendance: 20,156
- Box score

Game information

**First quarter**

- LAC – Royce Womble 25-yard pass from Jack Kemp (Ben Agajanian kick), 8:48. Chargers 7–0. **Drive: 7 plays, 60 yards.**
- HOU – Dave Smith 47-yard run (George Blanda kick), 5:17. Tied 7–7. **Drive: 2 plays, 47 yards.**
- HOU – George Blanda 1-yard run (George Blanda kick), 1:58. Oilers 14–7. **Drive: 5 plays, 27 yards.**

**Second quarter**

- HOU – George Blanda 1-yard run (George Blanda kick), 11:30. Oilers 21–7. **Drive: 8 plays, 36 yards.**
- LAC – Ralph Anderson 3-yard pass from Jack Kemp (Ben Agajanian kick), 5:30. Oilers 21–14. **Drive: 8 plays, 62 yards.**

**Third quarter**

- HOU – George Blanda 1-yard run (George Blanda kick), 11:47. Oilers 28–14. **Drive: 7 plays, 71 yards.**
- HOU – George Blanda 13-yard field goal, 9:44. Oilers 31–14. **Drive: 5 plays, 13 yards.**
- HOU – Charlie Tolar 1-yard run (George Blanda kick), 7:43. Oilers 38–14. **Drive: 4 plays, 18 yards.**

**Fourth quarter**

- LAC – Royce Womble 18-yard pass from Jack Kemp (Ben Agajanian kick), 13:36. Oilers 38–21. **Drive: 4 plays, 83 yards.**
- LAC – Charlie Flowers 55-yard pass from Jack Kemp (Ben Agajanian kick), 1:48. Oilers 38–28. **Drive: 5 plays, 89 yards.**

**Top passers**

- LAC – Jack Kemp – 27/44, 337 yards, 4 TD, INT
- HOU – George Blanda – 6/17, 101 yards

**Top rushers**

- LAC – Howie Ferguson – 7 rushes, 20 yards
- HOU – Dave Smith – 14 rushes, 77 yards, TD

**Top receivers**

- LAC – Howard Clark – 4 receptions, 94 yards
- HOU – Johnny Carson – 3 receptions, 54 yards

A bad start to the 3rd quarter led to defeat for the Chargers in their first road game. Kemp found Royce Womble for a touchdown on their first drive and, following a burst of three touchdowns on three consecutive possessions for the Oilers, connected with Anderson on a short out pattern to close to 21–14 at the break. After Houston opened the second half with a 71-yard touchdown drive, Ron Waller lost a fumble on the Chargers' next play from scrimmage, setting up a field goal. On the ensuing kickoff, Lowe also fumbled, with Houston converting the turnover into a touchdown and a 38–14 lead. Kemp threw touchdowns to Womble and Charlie Flowers in the 4th quarter, the latter a catch-and-run of 55 yards, but the scores came too late to seriously threaten a comeback.

Kemp achieved the first 300-yard passing game in the fledgling AFL, going 27 of 44 for 337 yards, four touchdowns and an interception. For the second consecutive game, Los Angeles' top rusher gained 20 yards; as a team, they were outrushed 284–28.

==== Week 3: at Dallas Texans ====
Week Three: Los Angeles Chargers at Dallas Texans – Game summary

Quarter	1	2	3	4	Total
Chargers	0	0	0	0	**0**
Texans	0	7	0	10	**17**

at Cotton Bowl, Dallas, Texas

- Date: September 25
- Game weather: 68 °F (20.0 °C), relative humidity 80%, wind 15 mph
- Game attendance: 42,000
- Box score

Game information

**First quarter**

- No scoring plays.

**Second quarter**

- DAL – Johnny Robinson 6-yard pass from Cotton Davidson (Cotton Davidson kick), 0:47. Texans 7–0. **Drive: 7 plays, 58 yards.**

**Third quarter**

- No scoring plays.

**Fourth quarter**

- DAL – Curley Johnson 1-yard run (Cotton Davidson kick), 10:53. Texans 10–0. **Drive: 13 plays, 80 yards.**
- DAL – Cotton Davidson 11-yard field goal, 2:57. Texans 17–0. **Drive: 10 plays, 44 yards.**

**Top passers**

- LAC – Jack Kemp – 11/30, 89 yards, 4 INT
- DAL – Cotton Davidson – 17/37, 167 yards, TD, 2 INT

**Top rushers**

- LAC – Howie Ferguson – 17 rushes, 93 yards
- DAL – Johnny Robinson – 9 rushes, 45 yards

**Top receivers**

- LAC – Howard Clark – 4 receptions, 44 yards
- DAL – Max Boydston – 4 receptions, 52 yards

Kemp struggled, throwing four interceptions against only 89 passing yards as the Chargers were shut out. Los Angeles had a couple of good openings while the game was still scoreless: they reached the Dallas 29, only for Kemp to be sacked for a 16-yard loss, and Ben Agajanian to see a long field goal attempt blocked; later, Los Angeles drove from their own 20 to the Dallas 22, but Flowers lost a fumble. Kemp fumbled on the next Charger drive, setting up the first Texan touchdown. Agajanian missed two kicks in the 3rd quarter, and Dallas added ten points in the 4th to clinch the win.

Los Angeles committed six of the game's nine turnovers. The running game improved, with Howie Ferguson gaining 93 yards on 17 carries.

==== Week 4: at Buffalo Bills ====
Week Four: Los Angeles Chargers at Buffalo Bills – Game summary

Quarter	1	2	3	4	Total
Chargers	0	7	7	10	**24**
Bills	0	3	7	0	**10**

at War Memorial Stadium, Buffalo, New York

- Date: October 2
- Game weather: 51 °F (10.6 °C), relative humidity 78%, wind 16 mph
- Game attendance: 15,821
- Box score

Game information

**First quarter**

- No scoring plays.

**Second quarter**

- BUF – Darrell Harper 35-yard field goal, 6:27. Texans 7–0. **Drive: 7 plays, 28 yards.**
- LAC – Dave Kocourek 11-yard pass from Bob Clatterbuck (Ben Agajanian kick), 1:15. Texans 7–0. **Drive: 4 plays, 59 yards.**

**Third quarter**

- LAC – Howie Ferguson 2-yard run (Ben Agajanian kick), 6:34. Texans 7–0. **Drive: 6 plays, 30 yards.**
- BUF – Elbert Dubenion 36-yard pass from Richie Lucas (Billy Atkins kick), 3:12. Texans 7–0. **Drive: 3 plays, 70 yards.**

**Fourth quarter**

- LAC – Charlie Flowers 7-yard run (Ben Agajanian kick), 0:47. Texans 7–0. **Drive: 2 plays, 13 yards.**
- LAC – Ben Agajanian 16-yard field goal, 0:47. Texans 7–0. **Drive: 6 plays, 13 yards.**

**Top passers**

- LAC – Bob Clatterbuck – 9/15, 70 yards, TD, INT
- BUF – Bob Brodhead – 4/10, 60 yards, INT

**Top rushers**

- LAC – Charlie Flowers – 10 rushes, 60 yards, TD
- BUF – Billy Atkins – 1 rush, 36 yards

**Top receivers**

- LAC – Paul Lowe – 3 receptions, 32 yards
- BUF – Elbert Dubenion – 6 receptions, 88 yards, TD

Four interceptions by their defense allowed Los Angeles to win despite 159 yards of total offense. Ferguson fumbled away their first big scoring opportunity, and Buffalo took the lead with a field goal. Before halftime, however, Paul Maguire claimed the first Charger interception, a 37-yard pass interference penalty moved the ball to the 11, and Bobby Clatterbuck, playing for an injured Kemp, threw to Dave Kocourek on a crossing pattern for the go-ahead score.

Maguire's second interception set up a 30-yard touchdown drive in the third quarter, Ferguson diving over the line from two yards out. The Bills pulled back to within four points, but a Dick Harris interception gave Los Angeles even better field position, at the Bills 13. Flowers rushed for a touchdown two plays later. Shortly afterwards, Jimmy Sears intercepted a pass and returned it 47 yards to set up a field goal; the final Bills threat was ended by a sack on 4th and goal from the nine.

==== Week 5: vs. Boston Patriots ====
Week Five: Boston Patriots at Los Angeles Chargers – Game summary

Quarter	1	2	3	4	Total
Patriots	18	7	10	0	**35**
Chargers	0	0	0	0	**0**

at Memorial Coliseum, Los Angeles, California

- Date: October 8
- Game weather: 65 °F (18.3 °C), relative humidity 81%, wind 10 mph
- Game attendance: 18,226
- Box score

Game information

**First quarter**

- BOS – Gino Cappelletti 23-yard field goal, 10:47. Patriots 3–0. **Drive: 11 plays, 50 yards.**
- BOS – Ron Burton 4-yard run (Jim Crawford pass from Gino Cappelletti), 8:19. Patriots 11–0. **Drive: 5 plays, 25 yards.**
- BOS – Jim Colclough 19-yard pass from Butch Songin (Gino Cappelletti kick), 1:28. Patriots 18–0. **Drive: 5 plays, 65 yards.**

**Second quarter**

- BOS – Jim Crawford 1-yard run (Gino Cappelletti kick), 4:36. Patriots 25–0. **Drive: 5 plays, 84 yards.**

**Third quarter**

- BOS – Alan Miller 1-yard run (Gino Cappelletti kick), 7:18. Patriots 32–0. **Drive: 8 plays, 26 yards.**
- BOS – Gino Cappelletti 33-yard field goal, 3:13. Patriots 35–0. **Drive: 8 plays, 37 yards.**

**Fourth quarter**

- No scoring plays.

**Top passers**

- BOS – Butch Songin – 9/15, 182 yards, TD
- LAC – Jack Kemp – 15/28, 140 yards, 2 INT

**Top rushers**

- BOS – Jim Crawford – 2 rushes, 89 yards
- LAC – Paul Lowe – 5 rushes, 14 yards

**Top receivers**

- BOS – Billy Wells – 2 receptions, 89 yards
- LAC – Ralph Anderson – 7 receptions, 73 yards

The Chargers suffered their second shutout in three weeks, this time before their home fans. Courtesy of a fumbled kickoff, the Chargers trailed 11–0 before their offense got onto the field. With Boston's rushing attack churning out 177 yards on 45 carries, the game soon drifted away from Los Angeles. The Chargers tried bringing Kemp back in the second half, only to see him throw two interceptions. Their best chance to avert the shutout came in the 4th quarter, when Ferguson fumbled a yard from the goal line.

==== Week 6: at Denver Broncos ====
Week Six: Los Angeles Chargers at Denver Broncos – Game summary

Quarter	1	2	3	4	Total
Chargers	7	3	13	0	**23**
Broncos	6	3	0	10	**19**

at Bears Stadium, Denver, Colorado

- Date: October 16
- Game weather: 43 °F (6.1 °C), relative humidity 67%, wind 4 mph
- Game attendance: 19,141
- Box score

Game information

**First quarter**

- DEN – Gene Mingo 17-yard field goal, 12:30. Broncos 3–0. **Drive: 4 plays, 0 yards.**
- LAC – Paul Lowe 12-yard run (Ben Agajanian kick), 7:49. Chargers 7–3. **Drive: 3 plays, 55 yards.**
- DEN – Gene Mingo 13-yard field goal, 1:19. Chargers 7–6. **Drive: 5 plays, 67 yards.**

**Second quarter**

- LAC – Ben Agajanian 11-yard field goal, 4:07. Chargers 10–6. **Drive: 18 plays, 77 yards.**
- DEN – Gene Mingo 38-yard field goal, 0:33. Chargers 10–9. **Drive: 12 plays, 50 yards.**

**Third quarter**

- LAC – Ben Agajanian 26-yard field goal, 13:06. Chargers 13–9. **Drive: 4 plays, -6 yards.**
- LAC – Ben Agajanian 47-yard field goal, 3:57. Chargers 16–9. **Drive: 12 plays, 48 yards.**
- LAC – Paul Lowe 44-yard run (Ben Agajanian kick), 0:52. Chargers 23–9. **Drive: 4 plays, 62 yards.**

**Fourth quarter**

- DEN – Gene Mingo 45-yard field goal, 14:34. Chargers 23–12. **Drive: 4 plays, -10 yards.**
- DEN – Al Carmichael 1-yard run (Gene Mingo kick), 3:35. Chargers 23–19. **Drive: 2 plays, 1 yard.**

**Top passers**

- LAC – Jack Kemp – 16/29, 243 yards, INT
- DEN – Frank Tripucka – 16/32, 155 yards, 2 INT

**Top rushers**

- LAC – Paul Lowe – 11 rushes, 72 yards, 2 TD
- DEN – Henry Bell – 3 rushes, 73 yards

**Top receivers**

- LAC – Paul Lowe – 4 receptions, 95 yards
- DEN – Lionel Taylor – 7 receptions, 54 yards

Paul Lowe had a breakout performance to lift the Chargers to an important win. Denver, topping the division with a 3–1 record coming in, led through an early field goal before Kemp passed to Lowe for 56 yards down the right sideline. On the next play, Lowe swept left for a 12-yard touchdown. A succession of field goals, the last a club-record 47-yarder by Agajanian, made it 16–9 to Los Angeles late in the third quarter. From the Denver 44, Lowe then took a handoff around left end before cutting back inside at the 15, breaking a tackle and completing his second touchdown run of the game.

The Broncos pulled three points back before both sides missed chances. Rommie Loudd intercepted Frank Tripucka to set the Chargers up at the Bronco 13, but Kemp fumbled three plays later. Denver then drove all the way from their 5-yard line to the Charger 8 before turning the ball over on downs. Given an opportunity to put the game away, Los Angeles instead gave the ball straight back through a Ferguson fumble. Denver scored two plays later; they shunned a two-point conversion attempt and trailed 23–19 with only 3:35 to play. Kemp converted a 3rd down with a completion to Kocourek, and Lowe had a 50-yard touchdown run ruled out by penalty before the Chargers had to punt in the final seconds. The Bronco return man was tackled at his own 23 yard line as time expired.

Lowe, who had gained only 38 yards on the ground and 35 through the air through the first five weeks of the season, rushed 11 times for 76 yards and two touchdowns, while catching 4 passes for 95 yards.

==== Week 8: at Boston Patriots ====
Week Eight: Los Angeles Chargers at Boston Patriots – Game summary

Quarter	1	2	3	4	Total
Chargers	7	21	7	10	**45**
Patriots	0	0	14	2	**16**

at Boston University Field, Boston, Massachusetts

- Date: October 28
- Game weather: 49 °F (9.4 °C), relative humidity 81%, wind 14 mph
- Game attendance: 13,988
- Box score

Game information

**First quarter**

- LAC – Howie Ferguson 1-yard run (Ben Agajanian kick), 1:36. Chargers 7–0. **Drive: 2 plays, 1 yard.**

**Second quarter**

- LAC – Jack Kemp 1-yard run (Ben Agajanian kick), 5:15. Chargers 14–0. **Drive: 7 plays, 80 yards.**
- LAC – Dick Harris 42-yard interception return (Ben Agajanian kick), 4:30. Chargers 21–0.
- LAC – Paul Lowe 76-yard run (Ben Agajanian kick), 0:30. Chargers 28–0. **Drive: 4 plays, 93 yards.**

**Third quarter**

- LAC – Paul Maguire blocked punt recovery in end zone (Ben Agajanian kick), 10:25. Chargers 35–0.
- BOS – Walter Beach 51-yard pass from Butch Songin (Gino Cappelletti kick), 8:30. Chargers 35–7. **Drive: 4 plays, 70 yards.**
- BOS – Oscar Lofton 21-yard pass from Butch Songin (Gino Cappelletti kick), 0:03. Chargers 35–14. **Drive: 8 plays, 70 yards.**

**Fourth quarter**

- LAC – Ben Agajanian 18 yard field goal, 11:30. Chargers 45–14. **Drive: 7 plays, 82 yard.**
- LAC – Ralph Anderson 38-yard pass from Jack Kemp (Ben Agajanian kick), 8:50. Chargers 42–14. **Drive: 1 play, 38 yards.**
- BOS – Safety, Don Rogers tackled in end zone, 0:00. Chargers 45–16.

**Top passers**

- LAC – Jack Kemp – 13/24, 223 yards, TD, INT
- BOS – Butch Songin – 11/25, 151 yards, 2 TD, 2 INT

**Top rushers**

- LAC – Paul Lowe – 8 rushes, 137 yards, TD
- BOS – Alan Miller – 12 rushes, 32 yards

**Top receivers**

- LAC – Ralph Anderson – 6 receptions, 124 yards, TD
- BOS – Walter Beach – 6 receptions, 80 yards, TD

Three weeks after their 35-point loss to Boston, the Chargers beat the same opponent by a similar margin; the win moved them into a tie atop the AFL West. Kemp was intercepted on the first Charger drive, but Maury Schleicher recovered a fumble deep in Patriot territory a few possessions later, and Ferguson opened the scoring from a yard out. Kemp later dove over from the same distance, one play after a 27-yard completion to Anderson; Dick Harris soon added a defensive touchdown, going 42 yards untouched down the sideline with an interception. Thirty seconds before halftime, Lowe exploited a hole in the line of scrimmage to go 76 yards untouched for the fourth Charger score, and when Paul Maguire recovered a blocked punt early in the 4th quarter, Los Angeles had matched the 35–0 score from the first game. Boston recovered somewhat with a pair of touchdowns, but Lowe broke off a 69-yard run to set up a field goal, and Anderson added a 38-yard touchdown reception before the end.

Lowe posted the first 100-yard rushing game in Charger history, with 8 carries for 137 yards and a touchdown, and Los Angeles outrushed Boston 219–46. Anderson caught 6 passes for 124 yards and a touchdown.

==== Week 9: at New York Titans ====
Week Nine: Los Angeles Chargers at New York Titans – Game summary

Quarter	1	2	3	4	Total
Chargers	0	7	7	7	**21**
Titans	0	0	7	0	**7**

at Polo Grounds, New York, New York

- Date: November 4
- Game weather: 51 °F (10.6 °C), relative humidity 44%, wind 27 mph
- Game attendance: 19,402
- Box score

Game information

**First quarter**

- No scoring plays.

**Second quarter**

- LAC – Howie Ferguson 1-yard run (Ben Agajanian kick), 12:27. Chargers 7–0. **Drive: 7 plays, 58 yards.**

**Third quarter**

- LAC – Paul Lowe 62-yard run (Ben Agajanian kick), 10:23. Chargers 14–0. **Drive: 3 plays, 80 yards.**
- NYT – Dewey Bohling 19-yard pass from Al Dorow (Bill Shockley kick), 5:45. Chargers 14–7. **Drive: 8 plays, 80 yards.**

**Fourth quarter**

- LAC – Jack Kemp 1-yard run (Ben Agajanian kick), 14:57. Chargers 21–7. **Drive: 3 plays, 21 yards.**

**Top passers**

- LAC – Jack Kemp – 13/33, 186 yards, INT
- NYT – Al Dorow – 12/32, 169 yards, TD, 3 INT

**Top rushers**

- LAC – Paul Lowe – 10 rushes, 80 yards, TD
- NYT – Bill Mathis – 10 rushes, 43 yards

**Top receivers**

- LAC – Howard Clark – 4 receptions, 72 yards
- NYT – Art Powell – 3 receptions, 65 yards

Big plays helped the Chargers get to the top of their division. After surviving a 1st quarter in which Ron Botchan twice snapped the ball over punter Paul Maguire's head, Kemp threw a deep pass on 3rd and 15 from his own 47 yard line and the ball deflected off the hands of a Titans' defender and Kocourek brought it in for a 52-yard gain. Ferguson reached the end zone from a yard out on the next play. Botchan later made amends for his miscues with an interception at his own 30, and it was 7–0 at the break.

Early in the 3rd quarter, the Charger line created open lanes for Lowe to run right through the middle; he outraced the defense and scored from 62 yards out, untouched. Jets QB Al Dorow threw a touchdown to pull the Titans back within seven points, but later fumbled, with Charlie Brueckman recovering at the New York 21. Kemp bootlegged for 17 yards, then went over from the one yard line on the first play of the 4th quarter. The Titans' best chance to get back into the game ended when Doyle Nix intercepted Dorow in the red zone - one of six takeaways for the Charger defense on the day.

==== Week 10: vs. Houston Oilers ====
Week Ten: Houston Oilers at Los Angeles Chargers – Game summary

Quarter	1	2	3	4	Total
Oilers	0	14	0	7	**21**
Chargers	14	7	3	0	**24**

at Memorial Coliseum, Los Angeles, California

- Date: November 13
- Game weather: 56 °F (13.3 °C), relative humidity 85%, wind 9 mph
- Game attendance: 21,805
- Box score

Game information

**First quarter**

- LAC – Ralph Anderson 34-yard pass from Jack Kemp (Ben Agajanian kick), 6:05. Chargers 7–0. **Drive: 1 play, 34 yards.**
- LAC – Ralph Anderson 4-yard pass from Jack Kemp (Ben Agajanian kick), 1:49. Chargers 14–0. **Drive: 7 plays, 43 yards.**

**Second quarter**

- HOU – Billy Cannon 6-yard pass from George Blanda (George Blanda kick), 4:36. Chargers 14–7. **Drive: 12 plays, 93 yards.**
- LAC – Paul Lowe 3-yard run (Ben Agajanian kick), 1:56. Chargers 21–7. **Drive: 6 plays, 70 yards.**
- HOU – Bill Groman 3-yard pass from George Blanda (George Blanda kick), 1:04. Chargers 21–14. **Drive: 8 plays, 68 yards.**

**Third quarter**

- LAC – Ben Agajanian 22-yard field goal, 3:39. Chargers 24–14. **Drive: 7 plays, 58 yards.**

**Fourth quarter**

- HOU – Billy Cannon 4-yard pass from George Blanda (George Blanda kick), 9:11. Chargers 25–0. **Drive: 8 plays, 66 yards.**

**Top passers**

- HOU – George Blanda – 31/55, 366 yards, 3 TD, 4 INT
- LAC – Jack Kemp – 18/37, 296 yards, 2 TD, 2 INT

**Top rushers**

- HOU – Dave Smith – 11 rushes, 31 yards
- LAC – Paul Lowe – 12 rushes, 85 yards, TD

**Top receivers**

- HOU – Charley Hennigan – 8 receptions, 110 yards
- LAC – Dave Kocourek – 7 receptions, 105 yards

Los Angeles intercepted George Blanda four times as they edged the East-leading Oilers. Houston's first three possessions resulted in turnovers, and two of those were converted into points, Anderson catching touchdown passes of 34 and 4 yards. The roles were reversed in the 2nd quarter, as a long bomb from Kemp was intercepted, and Blanda led his team 93 yards the other way for a touchdown. Lowe inspired an immediate response from the Chargers, breaking off a 40-yard run up the right sideline and going in from three yards out a play later. Houston came back with a 68-yard touchdown drive, and it was 21–14 at halftime.

Agajanian missed a 27-yard field goal on the first drive of the second half, but catches of 32 and 11 yards by Kocourek put him in position for another try, and he converted a 22-yarder. The next two Houston drives penetrated into Los Angeles territory, but Blanda was intercepted both times, by Rommie Loudd and Bob Zeman. Blanda threw his third touchdown pass on the next Oiler possession, and Houston had a late chance after Kemp was intercepted. They reached the Charger 44, but two incompletions were followed by two fumbles. Los Angeles recovered the second of these, and ran out the clock.

Kemp was 18 of 37 for 296 yards, two touchdowns and two interceptions; Kocourek caught 7 passes for 105 yards.

==== Week 11: vs. Buffalo Bills ====
Week Eleven: Buffalo Bills at Los Angeles Chargers – Game summary

Quarter	1	2	3	4	Total
Bills	6	13	0	13	**32**
Chargers	0	3	0	0	**3**

at Memorial Coliseum, Los Angeles, California

- Date: November 20
- Game weather: 62 °F (16.7 °C), relative humidity 28%, wind 9 mph
- Game attendance: 16,161
- Box score

Game information

**First quarter**

- BUF – Richie Lucas 17-yard pass from Tommy O'Connell (kick blocked), 3:41. Bills 6–0. **Drive: 6 plays, 25 yards.**

**Second quarter**

- LAC – Ben Agajanian 31-yard field goal, 10:11. Bills 6–3. **Drive: 8 plays, 55 yards.**
- BUF – Wray Carlton 1-yard run (Billy Atkins kick), 3:17. Bills 13–3. **Drive: 13 plays, 79 yards.**
- BUF – Archie Matsos 20-yard interception return (kick failed), 0:42. Bills 19–3.

**Third quarter**

- No scoring plays.

**Fourth quarter**

- BUF – Wray Carlton 7-yard run (Billy Atkins kick), 13:58. Bills 26–3. **Drive: 5 plays, 22 yards.**
- BUF – Dan Chamberlain 49-yard pass from Johnny Green (kick blocked), 9:06. Bills 32–3. **Drive: 1 play, 49 yards.**

**Top passers**

- BUF – Tommy O'Connell – 8/16, 92 yards, TD, INT
- LAC – Jack Kemp – 13/30, 189 yards, 5 INT

**Top rushers**

- BUF – Carl Smith – 8 rushes, 24 yards
- LAC – Paul Lowe – 5 rushes, 35 yards

**Top receivers**

- BUF – Dan Chamberlain – 2 receptions, 66 yards, TD
- LAC – Ralph Anderson – 7 receptions, 109 yards

The Chargers turned the ball over eight times as their four-game winning streak was brought to an end. The tone was set early, as Kocourek lost a fumble on their first possession, Kemp was intercepted on their second, and Sears fumbled a punt when they were expecting their third. Buffalo opened the scoring from that error; Agajanian then got Los Angeles on the scoreboard with a field goal, but the Bills drove 79 yards on 14 plays to an answering touchdown. Kemp threw five of the Chargers' six interceptions on the day. His struggles were epitomized by a sequence shortly before halftime, when he was sacked for a 24-yard loss on one play and had an interception run back for a touchdown on the next, putting the Bills up 19–3.

Ralph Anderson was one of the few bright spots for Los Angeles. He caught 7 passes for 109 yards in his final game.

==== Week 12: vs. Oakland Raiders ====
Week Twelve: Oakland Raiders at Los Angeles Chargers – Game summary

Quarter	1	2	3	4	Total
Raiders	7	0	7	14	**28**
Chargers	14	17	7	14	**52**

at Memorial Coliseum, Los Angeles, California

- Date: November 27
- Game weather: 52 °F (11.1 °C), relative humidity 69%, wind 7 mph
- Game attendance: 15,075
- Box score

Game information

**First quarter**

- LAC – Don Norton 69-yard pass from Jack Kemp (Ben Agajanian kick), 12:44. Chargers 7–0. **Drive: 4 plays, 84 yards.**
- OAK – J. D. Smith 1-yard run (Larry Barnes kick), 7:36. Tied 7–7. **Drive: 4 plays, 13 yards.**
- LAC – Paul Lowe 63-yard pass from Jack Kemp (Ben Agajanian kick), 6:50. Chargers 14–7. **Drive: 2 plays, 62 yards.**

**Second quarter**

- LAC – Howie Ferguson 1-yard run (Ben Agajanian kick), 7:41. Chargers 21–7. **Drive: 11 plays, 80 yards.**
- LAC – Jack Kemp 1-yard run (Ben Agajanian kick), 1:28. Chargers 28–7. **Drive: 11 plays, 64 yards.**
- LAC – Ben Agajanian 28-yard field goal, 0:01. Chargers 31–7. **Drive: 4 plays, 53 yards.**

**Third quarter**

- LAC – Paul Lowe 3-yard run (Ben Agajanian kick), 7:45. Chargers 38–7. **Drive: 11 plays, 55 yards.**
- OAK – Tony Teresa 11-yard pass from Tom Flores (Larry Barnes kick), 3:16. Chargers 38–14. **Drive: 14 plays, 77 yards.**

**Fourth quarter**

- OAK – Billy Lott 4-yard run (Billy Lott run), 12:54. Chargers 38–22. **Drive: 5 plays, 59 yards.**
- LAC – Fred Ford 1-yard run (Ben Agajanian kick), 7:48. Chargers 45–22. **Drive: 10 plays, 75 yards.**
- LAC – Doyle Nix 17-yard interception return (Ben Agajanian kick), 7:17. Chargers 52–22.
- OAK – Doug Asad 8-yard pass from Babe Parilli (run failed), 2:56. Chargers 52–28. **Drive: 11 plays, 55 yards.**

**Top passers**

- OAK – Tom Flores – 13/24, 119 yards, TD
- LAC – Jack Kemp – 13/24, 307 yards, 2 TD, 2 INT

**Top rushers**

- OAK – Billy Lott – 8 rushes, 77 yards, TD
- LAC – Paul Lowe – 26 rushes, 149 yards, TD

**Top receivers**

- OAK – Billy Lott – 5 receptions, 51 yards
- LAC – Don Norton – 4 receptions, 119 yards, TD

This game was played the day after the death of Ralph Anderson. Los Angeles scored more than 50 points for the first time. Don Norton began the scoring with a 69-yard touchdown reception only 2:16 into the game. The Raiders tied the score, but Lowe took a screen pass 63 yards for another touchdown only two plays later. He took a pass 33 yards in the 2nd quarter, opening an 80-yard drive that Ferguson finished with a dive over the middle on 4th and goal from the one. Kemp took in a sneak from the same distance, and Lowe's 30-yard run gave Agajanian the opportunity to kick a 28-yard field goal as time expired in the half.

Lowe added a 2-yard touchdown run the first time Los Angeles had the ball in the second half, and it was 38–7. Oakland then pulled back 15 points, but the Chargers responded with touchdowns from Fred Ford (a 4-yard run) and Doyle Nix (a 17-yard interception return of an underthrown pass in the flat).

Kemp was 13 of 24 for 307 yards, two touchdowns and two interceptions, while Norton caught 4 passes for 119 yards and a touchdown. Lowe carried 26 times for 149 yards and a touchdown, while catching two passes for 96 yards and a further touchdown. Linebacker and punter Paul Maguire sustained a season-ending knee injury during the game.

==== Week 13: at Oakland Raiders ====
Week Thirteen: Los Angeles Chargers at Oakland Raiders – Game summary

Quarter	1	2	3	4	Total
Chargers	0	14	0	27	**41**
Raiders	0	14	3	0	**17**

at Candlestick Park, San Francisco, California

- Date: December 4
- Game weather: 50 °F (10.0 °C), relative humidity 84%, wind 11 mph
- Game attendance: 12,061
- Box score

Game information

**First quarter**

- No scoring plays.

**Second quarter**

- LAC – Royce Womble 3-yard pass from Jack Kemp (Ben Agajanian kick), 14:21. Chargers 7–0. **Drive: 5 plays, 72 yards.**
- OAK – Billy Lott 2-yard run (Larry Barnes kick), 10:20. Tied 7–7. **Drive: 7 plays, 72 yards.**
- OAK – Charlie Hardy 11-yard pass from Tom Flores (Larry Barnes kick), 1:57. Raiders 38–14. **Drive: 6 plays, 46 yards.**
- LAC – Don Norton 21-yard pass from Jack Kemp (Ben Agajanian kick), 0:52. Tied 14–14. **Drive: 6 plays, 70 yards.**

**Third quarter**

- OAK – Larry Barnes 25-yard field goal, 3:53. Chargers 17–14. **Drive: 9 plays, 82 yards.**

**Fourth quarter**

- LAC – Paul Lowe 49-yard pass from Jack Kemp (Ben Agajanian kick), 12:59. Chargers 21–17. **Drive: 3 plays, 66 yards.**
- LAC – Jack Kemp 6-yard run (Ben Agajanian kick), 8:35. Chargers 28–17. **Drive: 5 plays, 44 yards.**
- LAC – Jack Kemp 9-yard run (Ben Agajanian kick), 2:54. Chargers 35–17. **Drive: 5 plays, 27 yards.**
- LAC – Rommie Loudd 49-yard defensive fumble return (kick failed), 0:44. Chargers 41–17.

**Top passers**

- LAC – Jack Kemp – 17/25, 289 yards, 3 TD
- OAK – Tom Flores – 16/27, 219 yards, TD, INT

**Top rushers**

- LAC – Paul Lowe – 18 rushes, 90 yards
- OAK – Tony Teresa – 14 rushes, 67 yards

**Top receivers**

- LAC – Dave Kocourek – 6 receptions, 123 yards
- OAK – Charlie Hardy – 4 receptions, 123 yards, TD

Los Angeles again beat Oakland by a significant margin, though they had trailed before scoring four unanswered 4th quarter touchdowns. A 45-yard run by Lowe got the Chargers moving, late in a scoreless 1st quarter; a Royce Womble touchdown finished the drive. Oakland scored 14 unanswered points, then sacked Kemp and backed Los Angeles up to their own 18 yard line, where they faced a 3rd and 18. Kemp responded with three completions over the middle in a span of four plays: 27 yards to Kocourek; 34 to Norton; 21 and a touchdown to Norton. In the 3rd quarter, Oakland stopped Ferguson on 4th and goal from the one, before driving 82 yards the other way and edging in front with a field goal.

The momentum shifted early in the 4th quarter. On 2nd and 9 from the Oakland 49, Kemp rolled right under pressure before throwing back toward the middle of the field. Lowe caught the ball at the Raider 35, and evaded three diving tackles on his way to the end zone. As the quarter wore on, two fumble recoveries in Raider territory would set up a pair of Kemp rushing touchdown, before Babe Parilli lost the ball while being sacked; it bounced up for Loudd to recover and race 49 yards for a touchdown.

Kemp was 17 of 25 for 289 yards, three touchdowns and no interceptions. The Chargers had two 100-yard receivers for the first time, with Kocourek catching 6 for 123 yards, while Norton had 7 receptions for 105 yards and a touchdown. The Chargers committed no turnovers for the first time in their history, while the defense managed four takeaways. Dick Harris had both an interception and a fumble recovery.

Oakland protested the result of this game. Los Angeles had brought in Al Bansavage to replace the injured Paul Maguire, but the Raiders, who had held the rights to the player, claimed that Bansavage had refused to play for them, and thus was ineligible for any other team. The Chargers claimed in response that Oakland had told Bansavage they did not want him. On December 7, AFL commissioner Joe Foss ruled that the result would stand.

==== Week 14: vs. Denver Broncos ====
Week Fourteen: Denver Broncos at Los Angeles Chargers – Game summary

Quarter	1	2	3	4	Total
Broncos	10	13	7	3	**33**
Chargers	14	10	0	17	**41**

at Memorial Coliseum, Los Angeles, California

- Date: December 10
- Game weather: 51 °F (10.6 °C), relative humidity 68%, wind 5 mph
- Game attendance: 9,928
- Box score

Game information

**First quarter**

- DEN – Gene Mingo 41-yard field goal, 12:30. Broncos 3–0. **Drive: 6 plays, 45 yards.**
- DEN – Lionel Taylor 49-yard pass from Frank Tripucka (Gene Mingo kick), 9:46. Broncos 10–0. **Drive: 2 plays, 50 yards.**
- LAC – Howie Ferguson 39-yard pass from Jack Kemp (Ben Agajanian kick), 9:18. Broncos 10–7. **Drive: 2 plays, 68 yards.**
- LAC – Paul Lowe 3-yard run (Ben Agajanian kick), 6:05. Chargers 14–10. **Drive: 3 plays, 32 yards.**

**Second quarter**

- DEN – Gene Mingo 1-yard run (Gene Mingo kick), 12:36. Broncos 17–14. **Drive: 12 plays, 98 yards.**
- DEN – Gene Mingo 41-yard field goal, 10:17. Broncos 20–14. **Drive: 4 plays, 6 yards.**
- LAC – Royce Womble 12-yard pass from Jack Kemp (Ben Agajanian kick), 6:46. Chargers 21–20. **Drive: 6 plays, 74 yards.**
- LAC – Ben Agajanian 23-yard field goal, 2:46. Chargers 24–20. **Drive: 9 plays, 35 yards.**
- DEN – Gene Mingo 13-yard field goal, 1:45. Chargers 24–23. **Drive: 5 plays, 62 yards.**

**Third quarter**

- DEN – Jim Greer 21-yard pass from Frank Tripucka (Gene Mingo kick), 5:29. Broncos 30–24. **Drive: 4 plays, 45 yard.**
- LAC – Ben Agajanian 40-yard field goal, 1:04. Broncos 30–27 **Drive: 8 plays, 43 yards.**

**Fourth quarter**

- DEN – Gene Mingo 28-yard field goal, 13:06. Broncos 33–27. **Drive: 9 plays, 70 yards.**
- LAC – Jack Kemp 1-yard run (Ben Agajanian kick), 6:53. Chargers 34–33. **Drive: 9 plays, 35 yard.**
- LAC – Don Norton 15-yard pass from Jack Kemp (Ben Agajanian kick), 5:02. Chargers 41–33. **Drive: 2 plays, 1 yard.**

**Top passers**

- DEN – Frank Tripucka – 17/35, 291 yards, 2 TD, 2 INT
- LAC – Jack Kemp – 15/32, 205 yards, 3 TD, 2 INT

**Top rushers**

- DEN – Dave Rolle – 17 rushes, 68 yards
- LAC – Paul Lowe – 19 rushes, 106 yards, TD

**Top receivers**

- DEN – Lionel Taylor – 9 receptions, 171 yards, TD
- LAC – Don Norton – 5 receptions, 81 yards, TD

Coming into the game, the Chargers were two games clear of Dallas at the top of the AFL West, and could clinch the division with a win. They did so after surviving a high-scoring, back-and-forth encounter.

Denver opened the scoring with a field goal, then Lionel Taylor, who would gain 171 yards on the day, caught a 49-yard touchdown from Frank Tripucka. It took Kemp only two plays to respond, passing to Norton for 32 yards, then to Ferguson with a jump pass. The back raced unchallenged up the right sideline for a 39-yard score. Next, Sears recovered a Denver fumble, Kemp scrambled for 25 yards, and Lowe scored from three yards out a couple of plays later. Following an exchange of punts, Denver drove 98 yards in 12 plays to retake the lead, and converted a Kemp interception into three more points. Lowe responded with back-to-back carries of 18 and 27 yards, before Kemp passed to Womble for 12 yards on a slant pattern to put the Chargers back in front. Los Angeles added an Agajanian field goal after a Denver fumble, the Broncos responded with a kick of their own, and it was 24–23 to the Chargers at halftime.

Tripucka's second touchdown pass put Denver back on top in the second half; following an exchange of field goals, Denver led 33–27 early in the final quarter. On the Broncos' next possession, a 20-yard punt set Los Angeles up only 35 yards from the end zone. Kemp picked up a couple of first downs with passes, converted a 3rd and 1 with a sneak, and dove in from a yard out for the go-ahead score. Tripucka was then forced to pass under pressure; the pass was tipped, and Maury Schleicher intercepted it. Norton's 15-yard touchdown three plays later made it an eight-point game, and Denver failed to cross midfield on their final two possessions.

Lowe carried 19 times for 106 yards and a touchdown. Despite the high stakes of this game, the Los Angeles attendance figures dropped below 10,000 for the first time. This would remain the lowest attendance for a competitive Charger home game until the COVID-19 pandemic necessitated empty stadiums in the 2020 season.

==== Week 15: vs. New York Titans ====
Week Fifteen: New York Titans at Los Angeles Chargers – Game summary

Quarter	1	2	3	4	Total
Titans	7	14	15	7	**43**
Chargers	10	6	17	17	**50**

at Memorial Coliseum, Los Angeles, California

- Date: December 18
- Game weather: 54 °F (12.2 °C), relative humidity 76%, wind 6 mph
- Game attendance: 11,457
- Box score

Game information

**First quarter**

- LAC – Paul Lowe 25-yard run (Ben Agajanian kick), 7:24. Chargers 7–0. **Drive: 1 play, 25 yards.**
- NYT – Bill Mathis 1-yard run (Bill Shockley kick), 4:09. Tied 7–7. **Drive: 7 plays, 80 yards.**
- LAC – Ben Agajanian 41-yard field goal, 1:06. Chargers 10–7. **Drive: 7 plays, 19 yards.**

**Second quarter**

- NYT – Don Herndon 6-yard pass from Al Dorow (Bill Shockley kick), 11:02. Titans 14–10. **Drive: 10 plays, 84 yards.**
- LAC – Don Norton 11-yard pass from Jack Kemp (kick blocked), 3:23. Chargers 16–14. **Drive: 7 plays, 46 yards.**
- NYT – Art Powell 34-yard pass from Al Dorow (Bill Shockley kick), 1:06. Titans 21–16. **Drive: 5 plays, 67 yards.**

**Third quarter**

- LAC – Ben Agajanian 37-yard field goal, 9:33. Titans 21–19. **Drive: 4 plays, 8 yards.**
- LAC – Don Norton 31-yard pass from Jack Kemp (Ben Agajanian kick), 6:47. Chargers 26–21. **Drive: 2 plays, 33 yards.**
- NYT – Al Dorow 1-yard run (Thurlow Cooper pass from Dick Jamieson), 3:13. Titans 29–26. **Drive: 3 plays, 13 yards.**
- LAC – Fred Ford 53-yard run (Ben Agajanian kick), 1:00. Chargers 33–29. **Drive: 4 plays, 80 yards.**
- NYT – Bill Shockley 42-yard pass from Al Dorow (Bill Shockley kick), 0:01. Titans 36–33. **Drive: 2 plays, 72 yards.**

**Fourth quarter**

- NYT – Leon Burton 11-yard run (Bill Shockley kick), 13:00. Titans 43–33. **Drive: 2 plays, 20 yards.**
- LAC – Blanche Martin 11-yard pass from Jack Kemp (Ben Agajanian kick), 10:23. Titans 43–40. **Drive: 5 plays, 63 yards.**
- LAC – Jack Kemp 5-yard run (Ben Agajanian kick), 5:06. Chargers 47–43. **Drive: 6 plays, 48 yards.**
- LAC – Ben Agajanian 27-yard field goal, 1:18. Chargers 50–43. **Drive: 4 plays, 8 yards.**

**Top passers**

- NYT – Al Dorow – 12/28, 200 yards, 3 TD, 3 INT
- LAC – Jack Kemp – 16/29, 239 yards, 3 TD, 4 INT

**Top rushers**

- NYT – Leon Burton – 12 rushes, 90 yards, TD
- LAC – Fred Ford – 7 rushes, 109 yards, TD

**Top receivers**

- NYT – Art Powell – 5 receptions, 82 yards, TD
- LAC – Dave Kocourek – 5 receptions, 92 yards

Los Angeles closed out their regular season schedule by prevailing in another high-scoring game for an eighth win in nine. The Chargers' first touchdown came the play after Harris's 35-yard punt return, which put the ball at the New York 25. Lowe ran into traffic around right end, avoiding a heavy loss before reversing field to the left and going in untouched. A pair of long touchdown drives put New York up 14–10; Norton's 11-yard catch briefly restored the Charger lead, but Titans QB Al Dorow threw his second touchdown pass of the game, and it was 21–16 at halftime.

In the 3rd quarter, an Agajanian field goal was followed by Norton's second touchdown, from 31 yards. The final 3:13 of the quarter brought three further touchdowns: Dorow sneaked in follow a Kemp interception, Fred Ford broke of a 53-yard touchdown run around left end, and Dorow threw his third touchdown pass. When the Titans converted another interception into seven points, two minutes into the final quarter, they led 43–33. Kemp responded with a 29-yard completion to Kocourek on the next play from scrimmage, and found Blanche Martin for an 11-yard touchdown four plays later. Martin kept hold of the ball despite running into the goalposts. The Titans then went three-and-out, and Sears broke off a 29-yard punt return to the New York 48. Six plays later, Kemp swept to the right for the go-ahead touchdown. Charlie McNeil, who had intercepted Dorow once in the opening quarter, did so twice more in the final minutes; the Chargers kicked a field goal after the first of these, and ran out the clock after the second.

Kemp finished with 3 touchdowns against 4 interceptions. Ford rushed for 109 yards on 7 carries, the best game of his solitary year in professional football. Los Angeles scored 40+ points for the fourth consecutive game, an AFL/NFL record which stood unmatched until the St. Louis Rams repeated the feat in the 2000 season.

== Standings ==
AFL Western Division
	W	L	T	PCT	DIV	PF	PA	STK
Los Angeles Chargers	10	4	0	.714	5–1	373	336	W4
Dallas Texans	8	6	0	.571	4–2	362	253	W3
Oakland Raiders	6	8	0	.429	2–4	319	388	W1
Denver Broncos	4	9	1	.308	1–5	309	393	L3

Note: Tie games were not officially counted in the standings in the AFL.

== Playoffs ==
Round	Date	Opponent	Result	Venue	Attendance	Recap
Championship	January 1, 1961	Houston Oilers	L 16–24	Jeppesen Stadium	32,183	Recap

=== Game summary ===
==== AFL championship game: at Houston Oilers ====
AFL championship game: Los Angeles Chargers at Houston Oilers – Game summary

Quarter	1	2	3	4	Total
Chargers	6	3	7	0	16
Oilers	0	10	7	7	24

- Date: January 1
- Game weather: 45 °F (7 °C), relative humidity 82%, wind 8 mph
- Game attendance: 32,183
- TV announcers (ABC): Jack Buck, George Ratterman, and Les Keiter
- Box score

Game information

First quarter

- LAC – Ben Agajanian 38-yard field goal, 10:58. Chargers 3–0. Drive: 9 plays, 46 yards.
- LAC – Ben Agajanian 22-yard field goal, 6:44. Chargers 6–0. Drive: 5 plays, 33 yards.

Second quarter

- HOU – Dave Smith 17-yard pass from George Blanda (George Blanda kick), 11:09. Oilers 7–6. Drive: 11 plays, 83 yards.
- HOU – George Blanda 18-yard field goal, 0:05. Oilers 10–6. Drive: 4 plays, 11 yards.
- LAC – Ben Agajanian 27-yard field goal, 8:48. Oilers 10–9. Drive: 7 plays, 60 yards.

Third quarter

- HOU – Bill Groman 7-yard pass from George Blanda (George Blanda kick). Oilers 17–9. Drive: 10 plays, 55 yards.
- LAC – Paul Lowe 2-yard run (Ben Agajanian kick). Oilers 17–16. Drive: 8 plays, 63 yards.

Fourth quarter

- HOU – Billy Cannon 88-yard pass from George Blanda (George Blanda kick). Oilers 24–16. Drive: 3 plays, 89 yards.

Top passers

- LAC – Jack Kemp – 21/41, 171 yards, 2 INT
- HOU – George Blanda – 16/31, 301 yards, 3 TD

Top rushers

- LAC – Paul Lowe – 21 rushes, 165 yards, TD
- HOU – Billy Cannon – 18 rushes, 50 yards

Top receivers

- LAC – Dave Kocourek – 3 receptions, 57 yards
- HOU – Billy Cannon – 3 receptions, 128 yards, TD

The first AFL title game matched two 10–4 divisional champions. Los Angeles scored field goals on their first two possessions of the game, with Lowe's 30-yard run on the second drive being the biggest play. The next time the Chargers had the ball, Kemp was intercepted in his own territory, but Blanda missed a 32-yard field goal wide right. Blanda, who doubled as a quarterback and kicker, did produce points on the next Oiler possession, capping an 83-yard drive with a 17-yard touchdown pass on 3rd and 10. Kemp was intercepted again five plays later, and Blanda led his team 40 yards before kicking an 18-yard field goal. Late in the half, Los Angeles capitalised on a 19-yard punt, with Agajanian's 27-yard field goal reducing their deficit to 10–9 at halftime.

Houston received the second half kickoff, and Blanda threw another touchdown pass to finish off a 55-yard drive, this time on 3rd and goal from the 7. In their response, the Chargers reached a 3rd and 13 at the Houston 35. Kemp eluded several pursuers while rolling to the right, eventually finding Kocourek 33 yards downfield to keep the drive going. Lowe scored from the next play; the Chargers opted not to try a two-point conversion, and trailed 17–16 after a successful extra point. The next four possessions ended in punts, the last of these pinning Houston at their own 11 yard line, early in the final quarter. After two plays gained only a single yard, Blanda threw his third touchdown of the game, finding Billy Cannon in stride at about the 32, with the running back winning a footrace to complete an 88-yard score. The Chargers tried to convert a 4th and 3 at the Houston 35 on their next possession, but Womble was stopped a yard short on a catch from Kemp. On the next drive, Houston reached a 4th and 1 from the 2 before the Charger defense stuffed them for no gain on a running play.

Los Angeles then began their final drive from their own 2. Norton caught a pair of 6-yard passes, before Lowe broke off a 20-yard run around the right end. A 13-yard Kocourek catch moved the ball to the Charger 47, before Kemp was sacked twice for the loss of 12 yards, bring up 3rd and 22. Kemp and Ferguson connected for 13 yards, and Lowe converted on 4th and 9 with another run around the right end, this time for 24 yards, to the Houston 28. A 6-yard pass to Flowers, either side of two incompletions, brought up 4th and 4 from the 22 with a little over a minute remaining. Kemp's last pass, intended for Kocourek, was incomplete, and Houston ran out the clock to clinch the AFL title.

Blanda was 16 of 31 for 301 yards and three touchdowns, each of which came on 3rd down. Kemp was 21 of 41 for 171 yards, with two interceptions. Lowe rushed 21 times for 165 yards and a touchdown. Chargers didn’t meet the Houston Oilers in the playoffs so in 1961 lost in the AFL Championship Game to the Oilers 10-3.

== Awards ==
While the AFL All-Star game wasn't run until the AFL's second season, the Associated Press named an All-AFL Team featuring four Chargers: Dick Harris, Jack Kemp, Paul Lowe and Ron Mix. In addition, Kemp received six votes as the UPI AFL player of the year, (Note: Abner Haynes of the Texans won with nine votes.) and Gillman received five votes as the UPI coach of the year. (Note: Lou Rymkus of the Oilers won with nine votes.)
