= 1960 Denver Broncos season =

American football team season

- Owner: Bob Howsam
- General manager: Dean Griffing
- Head coach: Frank Filchock
- Home stadium: Bears Stadium

Results
- Record: 4–9–1
- Division place: 4th AFL Western
- Playoffs: Did not qualify

The 1960 Denver Broncos season was the team's inaugural year in the American Football League. Led by head coach Frank Filchock, the Broncos recorded four wins, nine losses, and one tie, finishing last in the AFL's Western Division.

== Personnel ==
=== Staff / Coaches ===
1960 Denver Broncos staff
Front office: Team Owner - Team President – Robert L Howsam; Chairman of the Board – Lee W Howsam; Vice president – Earl R Howsam; General Manager – Dean Griffing
Coaching staff Head coach: Head coach – Frank Filchock; Assistant coaches: Backfield coach – Jim Cason; Line coach – Dale Dodrill
Other personnel: Trainer - Fred Posey; Equipment Manager - Harvey Stephen

=== Roster ===
1960 Denver Broncos roster
Quarterbacks (QB): 16 George Herring P; 18 Frank Tripucka; Running backs (RB): 43 Don Allen; 36 J. W. Brodnax; 21 Gene Mingo K; 35 Dave Rolle; 22 Bob Stransky; 40 Ted Wegert; Wide receivers (WR): 81 Ken Carpenter; 87 Lionel Taylor; Tight ends (TE): 88 Pat Epperson; 85 Jim Greer	Offensive linemen (OL): 60 Ken Adamson G; 75 Eldon Danenhauer T; 62 Jack Davis G; 73 Grady Holz T; 77 Carl Larpenter T; 61 Mike Nichols C; 71 Willie Smith G; Defensive linemen (DL): 67 Johnny Hatley DT; 70 Don King DE; 64 Bud McFadin DT; 76 Bill Yelverton DE; 65 Joe Young DE	Linebackers (LB): 34 Hardy Brown MLB; 84 Al Day OLB; 52 Frank Kuchta MLB; 53 Bob Hudson OLB; 33 Pete Mangum OLB; 63 Dave Strickland OLB; Defensive backs (DB): 15 Dick Doyle CB; 23 Goose Gonsoulin FS; 41 Bob McNamara CB/WR; 83 Johnny Pyeatt CB; 42 Al Romine SS; Special teams (ST)	Reserve: 62 Buddy Alliston LB (IR); 20 Henry Bell RB (IR); 40 Al Carmichael WR (IR); 61 Chuck Gavin DE (IR); Rookies in italics

== Regular season ==
Week	Date	Opponent	Result	Record	Venue	Attendance	Recap
1	September 9	at Boston Patriots	**W** 13–10	1–0	Boston University Field	21,597	Recap
2	September 17	at Buffalo Bills	**W** 27–21	2–0	War Memorial Stadium	15,229	Recap
3	September 23	at New York Titans	**L** 24–28	2–1	Polo Grounds	20,462	Recap
4	October 2	**Oakland Raiders**	**W** 31–14	3–1	Bears Stadium	18,372	Recap
5	Bye						
6	October 16	**Los Angeles Chargers**	**L** 19–23	3–2	Bears Stadium	19,141	Recap
7	October 23	Boston Patriots	**W** 31–24	4–2	Bears Stadium	12,683	Recap
8	October 30	**Dallas Texans**	**L** 14–17	4–3	Bears Stadium	13,002	Recap
9	November 6	Houston Oilers	**L** 25–45	4–4	Bears Stadium	14,489	Recap
10	November 13	at **Dallas Texans**	**L** 7–34	4–5	Cotton Bowl	21,000	Recap
11	November 20	at Houston Oilers	**L** 10–20	4–6	Jeppesen Stadium	20,778	Recap
12	November 27	Buffalo Bills	**T** 38–38	4–6–1	Bears Stadium	7,785	Recap
13	December 4	New York Titans	**L** 27–30	4–7–1	Bears Stadium	5,861	Recap
14	December 10	at **Los Angeles Chargers**	**L** 33–41	4–8–1	Los Angeles Memorial Coliseum	9,928	Recap
15	December 17	at **Oakland Raiders**	**L** 10–48	4–9–1	Candlestick Park	7,000	Recap
Note: Intra-division opponents are in **bold** text.

== Standings ==
AFL Western Division
	W	L	T	PCT	DIV	PF	PA	STK
Los Angeles Chargers	10	4	0	.714	5–1	373	336	W4
Dallas Texans	8	6	0	.571	4–2	362	253	W3
Oakland Raiders	6	8	0	.429	2–4	319	388	W1
Denver Broncos	4	9	1	.308	1–5	309	393	L3

Note: Tie games were not officially counted in the standings in the AFL.
