= 1960 All-AFL Team =

Official list of the best AFL players of 1960

The 1960 American Football League All-League Team was selected after the 1960 American Football League season by three separate entities: current AFL players, the Associated Press (AP), and United Press International (UPI), and was published by The Sporting News. Each selector chose a first-team, and the AFL players and UPI also selected second-teams at some positions.

== Teams ==
Offense
Position	First team	Second team
Quarterback	Jack Kemp, Los Angeles Chargers (AFL, AP, UPI)	Al Dorow, New York Titans (AFL); Frank Tripucka, Denver Broncos (UPI)
Halfback	Abner Haynes, Dallas Texans (AFL, AP, UPI); Paul Lowe, Los Angeles Chargers (AFL, AP, UPI)	Billy Cannon, Houston Oilers (AFL, UPI)
Fullback	Dave Smith, Houston Oilers (AFL, AP, UPI)	Wray Carlton, Buffalo Bills (AFL)
Wide receiver	Lionel Taylor, Denver Broncos (AFL, AP, UPI); Bill Groman, Houston Oilers (AFL, UPI); Art Powell, New York Titans (AP)	Art Powell, New York Titans (AFL, UPI)
Tight end	N/A	Howard Clark, Los Angeles Chargers (AFL)
Tackle	Ron Mix, Los Angeles Chargers (AFL, AP, UPI); Rich Michael, Houston Oilers (AFL, UPI); Al Jamison, Houston Oilers (AP)	Ernie Wright, Los Angeles Chargers (AFL, UPI); Jerry Cornelison, Dallas Texans (UPI); Al Jamison, Houston Oilers (AFL); Sid Youngelman, New York Titans (AFL)
Guard	Bob Mischak, New York Titans (AFL, AP, UPI); Billy Krisher, Dallas Texans (AFL, AP)	Ken Adamson, Denver Broncos (UPI); Billy Krisher, Dallas Texans (UPI); Charley Leo, Boston Patriots (AFL); Don Manoukian, Oakland Raiders (AFL)
Center	Jim Otto, Oakland Raiders (AFL, AP); Walt Cudzik, Boston Patriots (UPI)	Dan McGrew, Buffalo Bills (AFL); Jim Otto, Oakland Raiders (UPI)

Defense
Position	First team	Second team
Defensive end	LaVerne Torczon, Buffalo Bills (AFL, AP, UPI); Mel Branch, Dallas Texans (AFL, AP, UPI)	Paul Miller, Dallas Texans (AFL, UPI); Bob Dee, Boston Patriots (AFL); Ron Nery, Los Angeles Chargers (UPI)
Defensive tackle	Bud McFadin, Denver Broncos (AFL, AP, UPI); Chuck McMurtry, Buffalo Bills (AP, UPI); Volney Peters, Los Angeles Chargers (AFL)	Orville Trask, Houston Oilers (AFL, UPI); Dick Chorovich, Los Angeles Chargers (UPI)
Middle linebacker	Archie Matsos, Buffalo Bills (AFL, AP, UPI); Sherrill Headrick, Dallas Texans (AFL, AP)	Sherrill Headrick, Dallas Texans (UPI); Dennit Morris, Houston Oilers (AFL)
Outside linebacker	Tom Addison, Boston Patriots (AFL); Mike Dukes, Houston Oilers (UPI); Larry Grantham, New York Titans (AP); Paul Maguire, Los Angeles Chargers (UPI)	Larry Grantham, New York Titans (AFL, UPI); Bob Dougherty, Oakland Raiders (UPI); Paul Maguire, Los Angeles Chargers (AFL)
Cornerback	Dick Harris, Los Angeles Chargers (AFL, AP); Johnny Bookman, Dallas Texans (UPI); Mark Johnston, Houston Oilers (AP); Eddie Macon, Oakland Raiders (UPI)	Mark Johnston, Houston Oilers (AFL, UPI); Joe Cannavino, Oakland Raiders (UPI); Eddie Macon, Oakland Raiders (UPI); Dave Webster, Dallas Texans (AFL)
Safety	Goose Gonsoulin, Denver Broncos (AFL, AP); Richie McCabe, Buffalo Bills (AFL, AP); Fred Bruney, Boston Patriots (UPI); Ross O'Hanley (AFL); Julian Spence, Houston Oilers (UPI)	Goose Gonsoulin, Denver Broncos (UPI); Richie McCabe, Buffalo Bills (UPI); Jim Wagstaff, Buffalo Bills (AFL)
