= 1962 All-AFL Team =

Official list of the best AFL players of 1962

The 1962 American Football League All-League Team was selected after the 1962 American Football League season by three separate entities: current AFL players, the Associated Press (AP), and United Press International (UPI), and was published by The Sporting News. The AFL players only selected a first team, while the AP and UPI also selected second teams at some positions.

== Offense and defense ==
Offense
Position	First team	Second team
Quarterback	Len Dawson, Dallas Texans (AFL, AP, UPI)	George Blanda, Houston Oilers (AP, UPI)
Halfback	Abner Haynes, Dallas Texans (AFL, AP, UPI)	N/A
Fullback	Cookie Gilchrist, Buffalo Bills (AFL, AP, UPI)	Curtis McClinton, Dallas Texans (UPI); Charlie Tolar, Houston Oilers (AP, UPI)
Wide receiver	Chris Burford, Dallas Texans (AFL, AP, UPI); Charlie Hennigan, Houston Oilers (AFL, AP, UPI); Lionel Taylor, Denver Broncos (AP)	Art Powell, New York Titans (UPI); Lionel Taylor, Denver Broncos (UPI)
Tight end	Dave Kocourek, San Diego Chargers (AFL, UPI)	Dave Kocourek, San Diego Chargers (AP); Fred Arbanas, Dallas Texans (AP, UPI)
Tackle	Al Jamison, Houston Oilers (AP, UPI); Jim Tyrer, Dallas Texans (AFL); Charley Long, Boston Patriots (UPI); Harold Olsen, Buffalo Bills (AP); Eldon Danenhauer, Denver Broncos (AFL)	Charley Long, Boston Patriots (AP); Eldon Danenhauer, Denver Broncos (AP, UPI); Harold Olson, Buffalo Bills (UPI)
Guard	Ron Mix, San Diego Chargers (AFL, AP, UPI); Bob Talamini, Houston Oilers (AFL, UPI); Billy Shaw, Buffalo Bills (AP)	Bob Mischak, New York Titans (AP); Billy Neighbors, Boston Patriots (AP); Billy Shaw, Buffalo Bills (UPI)
Center	Jim Otto, Oakland Raiders (AFL, AP, UPI)	Bob Schmidt, Houston Oilers (AP, UPI)

Defense
Position	First team	Second team
Defensive end	Don Floyd, Houston Oilers (AFL, AP, UPI); Larry Eisenhauer, Boston Patriots (AP, UPI); Mel Branch, Dallas Texans (AFL)	Mel Branch, Dallas Texans (AP, UPI); Bob Dee, Boston Patriots (AP); Earl Faison, San Diego Chargers (UPI)
Defensive tackle	Bud McFadin, Denver Broncos (AFL, AP, UPI); Ed Husmann, Houston Oilers (AP, UPI); Jerry Mays, Dallas Texans (AFL)	Jerry Mays, Dallas Texans (AP, UPI); Tom Sestak, Buffalo Bills (AP, UPI)
Middle linebacker	Sherrill Headrick, Dallas Texans (AFL, AP, UPI)	Chuck Allen, San Diego Chargers (AP); Nick Buoniconti, Boston Patriots (UPI)
Outside linebacker	Larry Grantham, New York Titans (AFL, AP, UPI); E.J. Holub, Dallas Texans (AFL, AP, UPI)	Tom Addison, Boston Patriots (AP, UPI); Doug Cline, Houston Oilers (AP, UPI)
Cornerback	Fred Williamson, Oakland Raiders (AFL, AP, UPI); Tony Banfield, Houston Oilers (AFL, AP, UPI)	Dick Felt, Boston Patriots (AP, UPI); Dick Harris, San Diego Chargers (AP, UPI)
Safety	Goose Gonsoulin, Denver Broncos (AFL, AP); Bobby Hunt, Dallas Texans (AP, UPI); Bob Zeman, Denver Broncos (AFL); Jim Norton, Houston Oilers (UPI)	Bob Zeman, Denver Broncos (AP, UPI); Jim Norton, Houston Oilers (AP); Goose Gonsoulin, Denver Broncos (UPI)

== Other selections ==
Return specialist and placekicker: Gene Mingo, Denver Broncos (AP-2)
