= Johnny Bookman =

American football player (1932–1995)

No. 22, 29
- Position: Cornerback

Personal information
- Born: September 6, 1932; Baton Rouge, Louisiana, U.S.
- Died: October 23, 1995 (aged 63); Baton Rouge, Louisiana, U.S.
- Listed height: 5 ft 11 in (1.80 m)
- Listed weight: 182 lb (83 kg)

Career information
- High school: Baton Rouge
- College: Miami (FL) (1953–1956)
- NFL draft: 1957: 8th round, 97th overall pick

Career history
- New York Giants (1957); Dallas Texans (1960); New York Titans (1961)

Awards and highlights
- First-team All-AFL (1960)

Career NFL/AFL statistics
- Interceptions: 13
- Fumble recoveries: 1
- Touchdowns: 1
- Stats at Pro Football Reference

John Dolan Bookman Jr. (September 6, 1932 – October 23, 1995) was a professional American football cornerback in the National Football League (NFL) and the American Football League (AFL). He played for three seasons for the NFL's New York Giants and the AFL's Dallas Texans and New York Titans.
