= Ross O'Hanley =

American football player (1939–1972)

No. 25
- Position: Defensive back

Personal information
- Born: February 2, 1939; Everett, Massachusetts
- Died: April 7, 1972 (aged 33); Needham, Massachusetts
- Listed height: 6 ft 0 in (1.83 m)
- Listed weight: 183 lb (83 kg)

Career information
- High school: Christopher Columbus (Boston, Massachusetts)
- College: Boston College

Career history
- Boston Patriots (1960–1965); Miami Dolphins (1966)

Awards and highlights
- TSN All-AFL (1960); 1959 Scanlan Award
- Stats at Pro Football Reference

Ross O'Hanley (February 2, 1939 – April 7, 1972) was an American football safety with the Boston Patriots of the American Football League from 1960 to 1965. He was an All-League AFL player in 1960.

O'Hanley was selected by the Miami Dolphins in the 1966 AFL expansion draft but never played a game for them. He suffered a severe thigh bruise during the preseason and missed the 1966 season, and was cut and retired before the 1967 season.

After his football playing days, O'Hanley first turned to coaching. O'Hanley coached the Lowell/Quincy Giants of the Atlantic Coast Football League (ACFL) from 1968 to 1969.

After coaching, he worked as a high school math teacher and as aide in the Massachusetts attorney general's office, before being struck by a brain tumor in 1971.

== See also ==
- List of American Football League players
