= Dave Kocourek =

American football player and announcer (1937–2013)

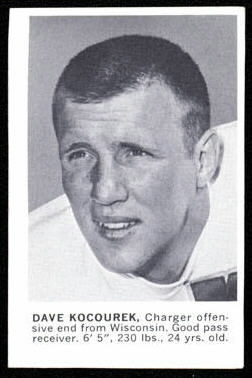

No. 83, 88
- Position: Tight end

Personal information
- Born: August 20, 1937; Chicago, Illinois, U.S.
- Died: April 24, 2013 (aged 75); Marco Island, Florida, U.S.
- Listed height: 6 ft 5 in (1.96 m)
- Listed weight: 240 lb (109 kg)

Career information
- High school: J. Sterling Morton East (Cicero, Illinois)
- College: Wisconsin (1955–1958)
- NFL draft: 1959: 19th round, 223rd overall pick
- AFL draft: 1960

Career history
- Winnipeg Blue Bombers (1959); Los Angeles / San Diego Chargers (1960–1965); Miami Dolphins (1966); Oakland Raiders (1967–1968)

Awards and highlights
- 4× AFL All-Star (1961–1964); 2× AFL champion (1963, 1967); AFL All-Time Second-team

Career AFL statistics
- Receptions: 249
- Receiving yards: 4,090
- Receiving touchdowns: 24
- Stats at Pro Football Reference

David Allen Kocourek (August 20, 1937 – April 24, 2013) was an American professional football player in the American Football League (AFL). He played college football for the Wisconsin Badgers. A four-time AFL All-Star and multiple All-AFL selection with the San Diego Chargers, he was named to the second team of the AFL All-Time Team.

== Early life ==
Kocourek was born on August 20, 1937, in Chicago. He attended J. Sterling Morton High School in Cicero, Illinois (later J. Sterling Morton High School East). Koucourek was a star end on the school's football team on offense, graduating in 1955. He also played defense for Morton. In one game during his senior season, he had four receptions for 152 yards, and recovered a fumble on defense. The Champaign News-Gazette, one of the two "official" sources on high school football accolades in Illinois at the time, named Kocourek All-State in football as a senior.

Kocourek also played center on Morton's basketball team, which won the Suburban League championship when he was a junior. He was also a member of the track team, competing in hurdles and the high jump.

== College career ==
Kocourek attend the University of Wisconsin, where he was a two-way player on the Wisconsin Badgers football team from 1956 to 1958. He was considered a fine tackler on defense, and both a good blocker and excellent receiver on offense, playing end. He caught six passes as a sophomore (1956) for 49 yards, but only three as a junior (1957) as his play was limited during the season with torn knee ligaments; however, he had a 56-yard touchdown reception and averaged 29.3 yards per catch in 1957.

In 1958, he was the Badgers' co-captain on a Wisconsin team that went 7–1–1. This was also his best season, with nine receptions for 119 yards. Kocourek received honorable mention on United Press International's (UPI) 1958 All-America team. The Newspaper Enterprise Association (NEA) gave Kocourek special mention in its 1958 All-America selections. The Associated Press (AP) selected Kocourek third-team All-Western Conference in 1958, honoring players in the Big Ten.

Kocourek was selected to play in the January 1959 Senior Bowl.

== Professional career ==
=== NFL and Canadian Football League ===
The National Football League's (NFL) Pittsburgh Steelers selected Kocourek in the 19th round of the 1959 NFL draft, 223rd overall. However, as a professional football player, Kocourek played his first season for the Winnipeg Blue Bombers of the Canadian Football League (CFL) in 1959, under future NFL Hall of Fame head coach Bud Grant. The Blue Bombers cut the 6 ft 5 in (1.96 M) 240 lb. (108.9 kg) Kocourek in early October 1959. He played in eight games for Winnipeg, until replaced by two former NFL receivers, Ferrell Funston and Ralph Anderson.

=== American Football League legacy and honors ===
Kocourek was one of the early stars of the American Football League (AFL). He was selected to play in the AFL's first four All-Star Games. The AP named him second-team All-AFL from 1961 to 1965. UPI named him first-team All-AFL in 1962, and second team All-AFL in 1961, 1963 and 1964. The NEA named him first-team All-AFL in 1963 and second-team All-AFL in 1964. The AFL named him first-team All-AFL in 1962. Kocourek was selected to the Pro Football Hall of Fame's All-Time All-AFL second-team at tight end, for the 1960s, behind only the Kansas City Chiefs' tight end Fred Arbanas.

=== Los Angeles/San Diego Chargers ===
After leaving Canadian football, Kocourek had written to a number of teams, seeking an opportunity to play. The Chargers' future Hall of Fame head coach Sid Gillman was the first to respond. In 1960, Kocourek joined the training camp of the Los Angeles Chargers, in the inaugural season of the American Football League (AFL). Kocourek made the team, starting six games as a rookie receiver. In addition to playing under future Hall of Fame head coach Sid Gillman, who is considered the primary innovator of the modern passing game in the NFL, Kocourek would be catching passes from future Hall of Fame quarterback Jack Kemp. In addition, the Charger's end coach was Al Davis, future owner of the Oakland Raiders. Davis worked with Kocourek for hours in developing his receiving skills, and admired Kocourek's qualities as a player and as a person.

Kocourek was second on the 1960 team in receptions (40) to Ralph Anderson (44), and led the team in receiving yards (662). The Chargers finished the season with a 10–4 record and played in the first AFL Championship Game, losing to the Houston Oilers, 24–16. Kocourek had three receptions for 57 yards in the championship game.

In February 1961, the Chargers moved to San Diego. Kocourek started 11 games at flanker and wide receiver. He led the Chargers with 55 receptions, 1,055 receiving yards and a 19.2 yards per catch average, all career-highs. He also had four receiving touchdowns. He was fourth in the AFL in total receptions and receiving yards, and third in yards per catch. Kocourek was selected to play in the first AFL All-Star Game. The Chargers again faced the Houston Oilers in the 1961 Championship Game, losing 10–3. Kocourek led all receivers in the championship game with seven receptions for 123 yards, an AFL record for total receiving yards at the time.

The Chargers moved him to tight end in 1962, the position he would play for the rest of his career. Kocourek caught 39 passes for 688 yards (16.9 yards per catch) and four touchdowns. The Sporting News and United Press International (UPI) named him first-team All-AFL at tight end, and the Associated Press (AP) second-team All-AFL, in his first season at the position in the AFL. The team's record fell to 4–10.

In 1963, the Chargers were 11–3 and finally won the AFL championship, 51–10 over the Boston Patriots. He had the fewest receptions (23) and receiving yards (359) of his career to date, but still made the All-Star Game and was named first team All-AFL by the Newspaper Enterprise Association and second-team by the AP and UPI. The Chargers primary receiver had become future Hall of Fame flanker Lance Alworth, who caught 61 passes that year.

In 1964, Kocourek had 33 receptions for 593 yards and five touchdowns. The Chargers went to the AFL championship game for the fourth time in five years, losing to the Buffalo Bills (quarterbacked by former teammate Jack Kemp), 20–7. Kocourek scored the Chargers' only touchdown on a 26-yard pass from Chargers' quarterback Tobin Rote. The AP, NEA and UPI all named him second-team All-AFL, and he was chosen to his fourth consecutive AFL All-Star Game.

1965 was Kocourek's final season with the Chargers. The team had a 9–2–3 record, and once again went to the AFL Championship Game, this time losing to the Buffalo Bills, 23–0. During the season, Kocourek caught 28 passes for 363 yards. The AP named him second-team All-AFL. After the season, the Chargers left Kocourek unprotected in the 1966 expansion draft when the Miami Dolphins entered the AFL. Kocourek was the first player taken by Miami. Kocourek's availability was surprising, but he speculated it may have been because of difficult contract negotiations between him and Gillman.

=== Miami Dolphins and Oakland Raiders ===
Dolphins coach George Wilson said Kocourek was the best player Miami obtained in the 1966 expansion draft, and named Kocourek offensive team captain before the team's inaugural 1966 season started. Kocourek led the team in receptions, with 27, for 320 yards and two touchdowns. The team finished with a 3–11 record.

In 1967, Miami traded Kocourek to Al Davis and the Oakland Raiders for a draft choice. He played his final two seasons in Oakland, starting only one game in two years, and catching one pass in 1967 and three in 1968. He served as backup to starting tight end Billy Cannon both years. Cannon had a down year in 1966, but was named first team All-AFL at tight end in 1967 by the AP and UPI. In 1967, Cannon started all 14 games at tight end with 32 receptions, averaging almost 20 yards per catch. In 1968, Cannon started 13 games, with 23 receptions for 360 yards.

After having only caught one pass the entire season in 1967, he caught a 17-yard touchdown pass in the Raiders victory over the Houston Oilers in the 1967 AFL Championship Game, on a fake field goal play toward the end of the first half. He had a kickoff return in the Raiders 33–14 loss in Super Bowl II. The Raiders lost the 1968 AFL Championship Game to the New York Jets, 27–23, but Kocourek did not record any offensive statistics in that game.

Kocourek announced his retirement in July 1969.

He played in seven AFL Championship Games, the only man to do so; with the Chargers in 1960, 1961, 1963, 1964 and 1965; and the Oakland Raiders in 1967 and 1968, winning one with each team. Kocourek participated in nine playoff games in a span of seven seasons, catching 15 passes for 257 yards and 2 touchdowns. Over his regular season career, he caught 249 passes for 4,090 yards and 24 touchdowns.

== Broadcasting career ==
Kocourek began his broadcasting career doing television color commentary on three Oakland Raider preseason games in 1969 for KNEW-TV. He served as a color commentator on NBC's AFL and NFL telecasts for five years, starting in 1969. In 1978, he worked for WDAE radio as a color analyst alongside play-by-play broadcaster Jim Gallogly, covering Tampa Bay Buccaneers games. In 1979, Mark Champion replaced Gallogly as play-by-play man alongside Kocourek on WDAE radio, working together into the mid 1980s.

== Personal life and death ==
Kocourek married his high school sweetheart Mary Lee Thyer. During his playing career, he worked as a stockbroker in the off season. After retiring, Kocourek and his family moved to Marco Island, Florida where he worked as a sales manager for Deltona Corporation in the 1970s. He and Mary Lee also worked as realtors there. Among other things, he worked as a ticket sales manager for the Tampa Bay Buccaneers.

Thirty years after his playing career ended, Kocourek began manifesting the first symptoms of progressive dementia, and was first diagnosed with dementia in 2002 at age 64. Over the ensuing years, his symptoms grew progressively worse, and Mary Lee eventually had to constantly be with him to prevent Kocourek from inadvertently harming himself. In 2010, she had to place him in a nursing home because her own health did not permit her to continue the rigors of constantly caring for Kocourek. He received some financial assistance from the NFL's Plan 88 (named for Hall of Fame tight end John Mackey), but it did not match the costs of care.

Kocourek died on April 24, 2013, in Marco Island. His brain was donated to Boston University's Center for the Study of Traumatic Encephalopathy (CSTE) for further examination as part of an ongoing concussion study to determine if Kocourek was among the NFL players who had Chronic Traumatic Encephalopathy (CTE). Mary Lee also pursued litigation against the NFL on behalf of herself and Kocourek on the basis that the NFL had failed to warn players like Kocourek on the long term risks from repeated blows to the head.

== AFL career statistics ==
Legend
| | Won the AFL championship |
| **Bold** | Career high |

=== Regular season ===
| Year | Team | Games | | Receiving | | | | |
| Year | Team | GP | GS | Rec | Yds | Avg | Lng | TD |
|---|---|---|---|---|---|---|---|---|
| 1960 | LAC | 14 | 6 | 40 | 662 | 16.6 | 52 | 1 |
| 1961 | SDG | 14 | 11 | **55** | **1,055** | **19.2** | **76** | 4 |
| 1962 | SDG | 14 | 13 | 39 | 688 | 17.6 | 45 | 4 |
| 1963 | SDG | 14 | 14 | 23 | 359 | 15.6 | 35 | **5** |
| 1964 | SDG | 14 | 13 | 33 | 593 | 18.0 | 49 | **5** |
| 1965 | SDG | 14 | 14 | 28 | 363 | 13.0 | 29 | 2 |
| 1966 | MIA | 14 | 14 | 27 | 320 | 11.9 | 43 | 2 |
| 1967 | OAK | 10 | 0 | 1 | 4 | 4.0 | 4 | 0 |
| 1968 | OAK | 7 | 1 | 3 | 46 | 15.3 | 18 | 1 |
| Career | | 115 | 86 | 249 | 4,090 | 16.4 | 76 | 24 |

=== Playoffs ===
| Year | Team | Games | | Receiving | | | | |
| Year | Team | GP | GS | Rec | Yds | Avg | Lng | TD |
|---|---|---|---|---|---|---|---|---|
| 1960 | LAC | 1 | 1 | 3 | 57 | 19.0 | 33 | 0 |
| 1961 | SDG | 1 | 1 | **7** | **123** | 17.6 | **40** | 0 |
| 1963 | SDG | 1 | 1 | 1 | 5 | 5.0 | 5 | 0 |
| 1964 | SDG | 1 | 1 | 2 | 52 | **26.0** | 26 | **1** |
| 1965 | SDG | 1 | 1 | 1 | 3 | 3.0 | 3 | 0 |
| 1967 | OAK | 2 | 0 | 1 | 17 | 17.0 | 17 | **1** |
| 1968 | OAK | 2 | 0 | 0 | 0 | 0.0 | 0 | 0 |
| Career | | 9 | 5 | 15 | 257 | 17.1 | 40 | 2 |

== See also ==
- List of American Football League players
