= Bob Schmidt (American football) =

American football player (born 1936)

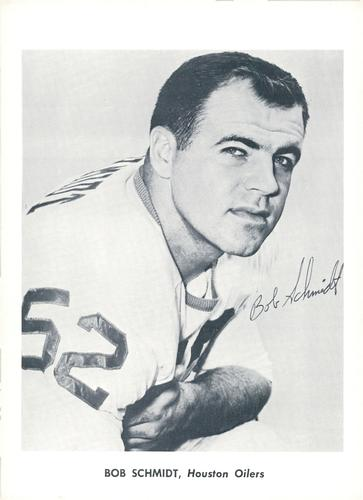

No. 78, 52, 74, 57
- Positions: Center, tackle, guard

Personal information
- Born: July 9, 1936 (age 90); Rochester, Minnesota, U.S.
- Listed height: 6 ft 4 in (1.93 m)
- Listed weight: 248 lb (112 kg)

Career information
- College: Minnesota (1954–1957)
- NFL draft: 1958: 14th round, 159th overall pick

Career history
- New York Giants (1959–1960); Houston Oilers (1961–1963); Boston Patriots (1964); Buffalo Bills (1966–1967)

Awards and highlights
- AFL champion (1961); Second-team All-AFL (1962); 3× AFL All-Star (1961, 1962, 1963)

Career NFL/AFL statistics
- Games played: 98
- Games started: 45
- Fumble recoveries: 1
- Stats at Pro Football Reference

Robert Malcolm Schmidt (born July 9, 1936), nicknamed "Two Bud", is an American former professional football player who was a center in the National Football League (NFL) and American Football League (AFL).

== Biography ==
Schmidt played college football for the Minnesota Golden Gophers. He started with the NFL's New York Giants and then moved to the new AFL's Houston Oilers in 1961. He was a member of the Oilers' American Football League Championship team in 1961, and was an AFL All-Star in 1961, 1962, and 1963. He finished his professional football career in 1967 with the AFL's Buffalo Bills.

Schmidt now lives in the Buffalo suburb of Hamburg, New York, with his wife Mary Margaret Schmidt (married December 8, 1994 in Rochester, NY).

== See also ==
- List of American Football League players
