= Fred Ford (American football) =

American football player (1938–2021)

No. 20, 26
- Position: Halfback

Personal information
- Born: March 30, 1938; Bakersfield, California, U.S.
- Died: May 22, 2021 (aged 83)

Career information
- High school: Tulare Union (Tulare, California)
- College: Cal Poly

Career history
- Buffalo Bills (1960); Los Angeles Chargers (1960)

Career statistics
- Rushing att-yards: 38-194
- Receptions-yards: 1-5
- Touchdowns: 2
- Stats at Pro Football Reference

Frederick Lee Ford (March 30, 1938 – May 22, 2021) was an American football halfback for the Buffalo Bills and Los Angeles Chargers of the American Football League (AFL). He played college football at Cal Poly for the Mustangs.

He died on May 22, 2021, at the age of 83.

== Collegiate career ==
Ford's top season at Cal Poly came in 1958, when he scored eight total touchdowns and led the squad in rushing, compiling 515 yards on 65 carries. Following the 1958 season, Ford was selected for Little All-America honorable mention.

== Professional football ==
For the 1960 Chargers, on December 18 against the New York Titans, Ford rushed for a career-high 109 yards and a touchdown on seven carries.
