= Sherrill Headrick =

American football player (1937–2008)

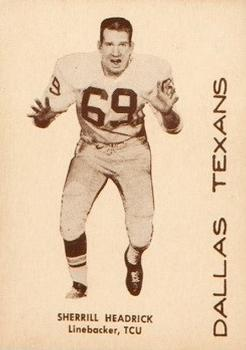

No. 69
- Position: Linebacker

Personal information
- Born: March 13, 1937; Waco, Texas, U.S.
- Died: September 10, 2008 (aged 71); Fort Worth, Texas, U.S.
- Listed height: 6 ft 2 in (1.88 m)
- Listed weight: 240 lb (109 kg)

Career information
- High school: North Side (TX)
- College: TCU
- NFL draft: 1960: undrafted

Career history
- Dallas Texans/Kansas City Chiefs (1960–1967); Cincinnati Bengals (1968)

Awards and highlights
- 2× AFL champion (1962, 1966); 3× First-team All-AFL (1960–1962); 2× Second-team All-AFL (1964, 1966); 5× AFL All-Star (1960–1962, 1965, 1966); Kansas City Chiefs Hall of Fame; Second-team All-SWC (1958)

Career NFL statistics
- Interceptions: 15
- Stats at Pro Football Reference

Sherrill Headrick (March 13, 1937 – September 10, 2008) was an American professional football player.

== Early life ==
Headrick grew up in Fort Worth, Texas, where he was an All-District fullback at North Side High School. He played college football at Texas Christian University, playing offensive guard. However, he had to drop out due to poor grades after his junior season. He then spent one year playing in the Canadian Football League.

== Professional career ==
While working in the west Texas and New Mexico oil fields during the off-season, in 1960 he became one of the first players to sign with the Dallas Texans in 1960 as an undrafted free agent. He played linebacker and went on to star for the team while they were the Texans and when they became the Kansas City Chiefs.

In his first year with the Texans, Headrick set the standard for playing hurt, after fracturing a vertebra in his neck in a pre-game collision at Houston. Despite feeling pain in his neck, he played the entire game. He learned of the fracture five days later, but went on to play the following week, earning the nickname "Psycho".

In his book "The American Football League – A Year-by-Year History, 1960–1969", Ed Gruver quotes Texans/Chiefs coach Hank Stram as saying that Headrick, who refused to wear hip pads, had the highest pain threshold [he'd] ever seen in an athlete. Headrick played with a broken neck, infected gums, and a fractured thumb. When an injury left the bone in his finger protruding from the skin, Headrick popped the bones in place without missing a play.

"He was a fantastic football player", former Chiefs tight end Fred Arbanas told The Kansas City Star. "Sherrill was so quick, most of the offensive linemen couldn’t get to him. He was such a wild man, people didn’t realize he was such a student of the game. Teams would come out in different formations, and Sherrill knew exactly where the ball was going to go."

He was a Sporting News All-AFL first-team selection in 1960, 1961 and 1962, when the Texans won the longest game ever played and defeated the two-time defending champion Houston Oilers in the double-overtime AFL Championship game.

He was an AFL Western Division All-Star in 1965 and in 1966, when the Chiefs won the franchise's second AFL title, and played in the first AFL-NFL World Championship game (the predecessor of the Super Bowl.

In 1967, the Chiefs drafted linebackers Willie Lanier and Jim Lynch and let Headrick go to the Cincinnati Bengals in the 1968 expansion draft. He finished his AFL career with the Cincinnati Bengals in 1968, the expansion Bengals' first season.

== After football ==
In 1993, he was inducted into the Kansas City Chiefs Hall of Fame.

During the next 15 years, he worked at various jobs and businesses, including ownership in a fried chicken franchise in Texas. He was also a nationally renowned tournament bridge player. He earned the rank of Diamond Life Master awarded by the American Contract Bridge League.

But the aftereffects of football injuries, including debilitating arthritis, took their toll. Headrick began collecting disability from the NFL at age 45. He used a wheelchair for the last 10 years of his life.

Headrick died on September 10, 2008, after a long battle with cancer at the age of 71.

== See also ==
- List of American Football League players
