= Jack Faulkner =

American football coach and administrator (1926–2008)

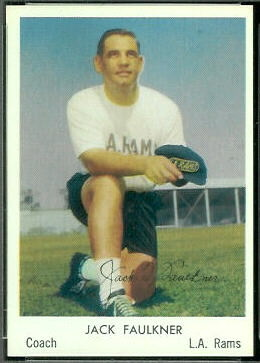
- Faulker with the Rams in 1959

Personal information
- Born: April 4, 1926; Youngstown, Ohio, U.S.
- Died: September 28, 2008 (aged 82); Newport Beach, California, U.S.

Career information
- College: Miami (OH)

Career history

Coaching
- Los Angeles / San Diego Chargers (1960–1961) Defensive backs coach; Denver Broncos (1962–1964) Head coach; Minnesota Vikings (1965) Defensive backs coach; New Orleans Saints (1968–1969) Defensive coordinator; Los Angeles Rams (1979) Offensive backfield coach

Operations
- Denver Broncos (1962–1964) General manager; New Orleans Saints (1970) Director of player personnel; Los Angeles Rams (1980–1993) Director of football operations

Awards and highlights
- AFL Coach of the Year (1962)

Head coaching record
- Career: 9–22–1 (.297)
- Coaching profile at Pro Football Reference
- Executive profile at Pro Football Reference

Jack Faulkner (April 4, 1926 – September 28, 2008) was an American football coach and administrator who most prominently served as head coach of the American Football League (AFL)'s Denver Broncos from 1962 to 1964. He also has been an integral part of the Los Angeles Rams organization, dating back to the team's first tenure in LA

== Early career ==
Faulkner served in the U.S. Marine Corps during World War II, then married Betty Lou Mackey in 1946. Playing the first of two seasons at linebacker for Miami University under head coach Sid Gillman proved to be a boon to Faulkner's future. When Gillman was hired as head coach at the University of Cincinnati in 1949, he brought Faulkner along and spent the next six seasons in that position with the Bearcats.

In January 1955, Gillman moved into the professional ranks when he was hired as head coach of the Los Angeles Rams, with the mentor again asking Faulkner to join him. The pair spent five years trying to return the team to its early success in the decade and reached the NFL Championship game in their first year. However, by 1959, the team had slumped to a 2–10 record, with Gillman announcing his resignation at the end of the season.

When Gillman accepted the head coaching reins of the fledgling Los Angeles Chargers of the AFL on January 7, 1960, he hired Faulkner two weeks later. The team won two conference championships, but fell short in both title games against the Houston Oilers. Faulkner's defense in 1961 was outstanding, with the Chargers (who now resided in San Diego) intercepting a professional record 49 opposing passes.

== Broncos head coach ==
That success resulted in Faulkner being hired as head coach of the Broncos on February 1, 1962. He then added the title of general manager when Dean Griffing was fired five months later, and after Faulkner took over, the team made two prominent efforts to change its image. The first involved switching the team's colors from its original brown and gold to the fondly remembered orange, blue and white, while the latter involved the public burning of the team's vertically striped socks in July. The socks had been roundly criticized and remain a part of dubious lore in professional football history. In later years, to commemorate the team's history, Faulkner sent one of the only socks left that was saved from the fire to the Pro Football Hame of Fame .

After starting the season with a 6–1 record, the team collapsed by going in reverse during the second half of the season and finishing with a 7–7 record. Despite the slide, Faulkner was named AFL Coach of the Year.

That signing would be one of the last positive developments for Faulkner in Denver as he started to reshape the roster, getting rid of many of the team's veterans, including quarterback Frank Tripucka. These moves would prove disastrous when the team, lacking a consistent signal caller, dropped to 2-11-1 on the year. The frustration of the campaign exploded in the season finale on December 22 when Gillman's powerhouse Chargers defeated Denver 58–20. Faulkner accused his good friend of running up the score, with San Diego scoring a touchdown in the final minute, then going for two points before trying an onside kick with six seconds left. Though the controversy put a strain on the two coaches' friendship for a brief time their lifelong camaraderie was never questioned.

When the team lost their first four games in the 1964 season, Faulkner was fired on October 4, 1964, and replaced by Mac Speedie, with his final record at 10–21–1. However, following the 6–1 start two years earlier, Faulkner's team had managed only a 4-20-1 mark. Unfortunately the Broncos never would achieve real success until a decade or more later with another rookie head coach at the helm, Red Miller, who led them to their very first playoff appearance.

== Later career ==
On January 22, 1965, Faulkner was hired as defensive backs coach of the Minnesota Vikings under Norm Van Brocklin, who had played quarterback with the Rams during Faulkner's tenure. The changing Northern climate had a major effect on the allergies of Faulkner's three-year-old son Jon, forcing him to resign after just one season before accepting a scouting position with the Rams.

After one season in that capacity, Faulkner went back to coaching as defensive backs assistant with the expansion New Orleans Saints under another former Ram, Tom Fears. After one year, Faulkner was promoted to defensive coordinator, but the continuing futility of the team resulted in Fears' dismissal midway through the 1970 NFL season. By that time, Faulkner had shifted to the team's front office, serving as player personnel director after the rigors of coaching had resulted in an ulcer. Before leaving the Saints for greener pastures once again in Los Angeles, Faulkner's last act with the Saints was to sign to the team a new quarterback whose last name still resonates in the NFL, Archie Manning.

On March 16, 1971, Faulkner joined the Rams for a third time, again becoming a scout for the team. Upon the arrival of new head coach Chuck Knox and long time friend two years later, Faulkner moved back into the coaching ranks again, serving seven seasons as the team's defensive line coach. During this stretch, the team played in five NFC Championship Games, finally winning the 1979 contest to compete in Super Bowl XIV.

Following that appearance, Faulkner left the coaching ranks for good and became the team's assistant general manager. That position quickly evolved into director of football operations which allowed him to best use his talents as a renowned evaluator of football talent. He served in that capacity up through the late 1990s when his title evolved into director of pro personnel responsible for evaluating the team's opponents and devising the weekly game plans with the coaching staff.

When the franchise shifted to St. Louis following the 1994 NFL season, Faulkner was one of the few staff members to stay in California. With Rams offices still based in Los Angeles he continued his work with the team all the way up to his death in 2008.
