= Henry Bell (American football) =

American football player (born 1936)

No. 20
- Position: Halfback

Personal information
- Born: 1937?
- Listed height: 5 ft 10 in (1.78 m)
- Listed weight: 210 lb (95 kg)

Career history
- Denver Broncos (1960)

Career AFL statistics
- Games played: 10
- Rush attempts: 43
- Rushing yards: 238
- Stats at Pro Football Reference

Henry Bell is an American former football player. A halfback, he played one season in the American Football League (AFL) for the Denver Broncos. He never attended college and played for several military service teams in Hawaii and Kansas before his one year in professional football. One of the original members of the Broncos, he was one of their main backs and played in 10 games while rushing for 238 yards.

== Early life and military service ==
Pro Football Archives lists him as being born in 1937 in Georgia, although a 1959 article from The Manhattan Mercury identified him as a native of Hawaii. Several modern sources also list him as having attended Valdosta High School, but The Mercury stated that he went to Boy's High School in Brooklyn, New York. He recalled in an interview in 2018 that he had been offered an athletic scholarship to play for the Kansas State Wildcats, but was unable to attend. Bell then began to serve in the United States Army in 1955 and played football and track and field for several military teams.

Being a member of the 25th Infantry Division stationed in Hawaii, Bell won the division track and field championships in 1956 with a 100-yard dash time of 9.8, as well as a 21.9-second 220-yard dash time. In football, he was named a Hawaii Army All-Star selection in all three years with the team (1955–1957) while playing both sides of the ball. On offense, the 5 ft 11 in, 200-pound halfback scored 16 touchdowns in 1956 and was selected to be a member of the Hawaii Pros, a team that played the College All-Stars in the Hula Bowl. He was one of only two people from the army to make the team.

After playing for the 25th Infantry Division, Bell played with the Funston Red Raiders of Fort Riley in Kansas, being named All-Army in 1959 after running for over 1,000 yards and scoring 13 touchdowns in just eight games. He was known for his ability to make long runs, with nine of his scores being over 20 yards. The Manhattan Mercury described Bell as a speedy player but a hard-hitter and said that whether he "is lugging the ball or making noise as a decoy, he is a dangerous man to be left unwatched on any football field."

== Professional career ==
Bell was signed by the Denver Broncos of the newly-formed American Football League (AFL) in July 1960. He later recalled his experience getting signed: "A guy came up to my house – I lived in Redondo Beach – and said, 'They're coming out with a new football league. Would you like to play?' I said, 'Yeah!' His name was Dean Griffing." Despite having never played college football, Bell was able to make the Broncos' final roster; he was one of only six players active in either the AFL or National Football League (NFL) that season to have never played collegiately. He was also one of eight black players on the original Broncos team. When asked in 2018 about how organized the league was, he said "There wasn't any [organization]. It was, 'There's a football game. Get together and go out there and play.' The money was good! The quarterback was [Frank] Tripucka, and we had a good team, I think."

Bell served as one of the team's primary backs, along with Dave Rolle. The Broncos played 14 games and went 4–9–1, with Bell appearing in 10 of those games while starting five; he placed second on the team with 43 rush attempts for 238 yards (a 5.5 average), also posting the Broncos' longest run of the season (and the league's fifth-longest) with a 68-yard rush. He became limited by a turf toe injury that occurred during a game against the Los Angeles Chargers and was released around December 1. Bell never played professional football again.

== See also ==
- List of American Football League players
