= Bob Dee =

American football player (1933–1979)

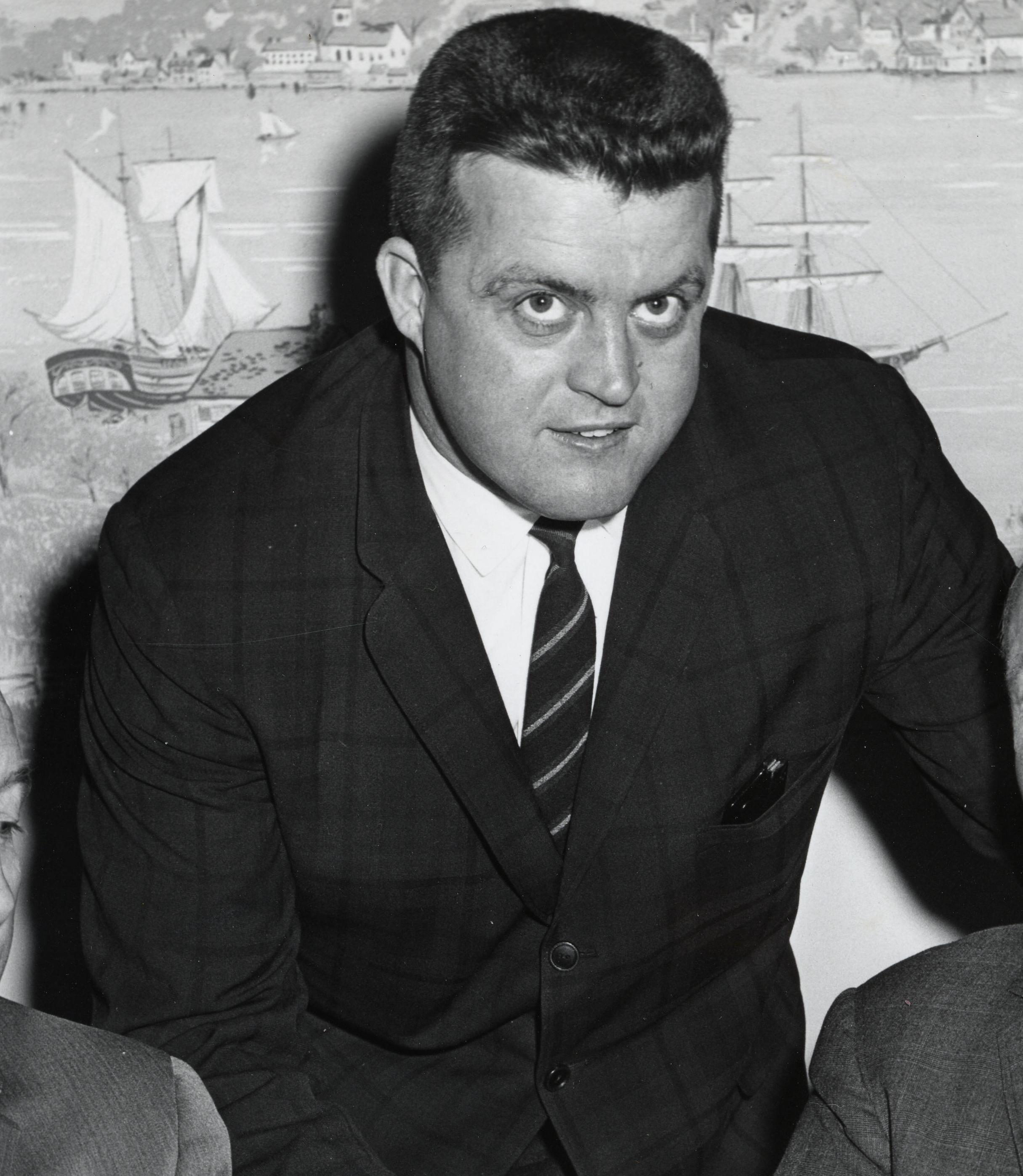

No. 89
- Positions: Defensive end, defensive tackle

Personal information
- Born: May 18, 1933; Quincy, Massachusetts, U.S.
- Died: April 18, 1979 (aged 45); Portsmouth, New Hampshire, U.S.
- Listed height: 6 ft 3 in (1.91 m)
- Listed weight: 248 lb (112 kg)

Career information
- High school: Braintree (Braintree, Massachusetts)
- College: Holy Cross
- NFL draft: 1955: 19th round, 220th overall pick

Career history

Playing
- Washington Redskins (1957–1958); Boston Patriots (1960–1967)

Coaching
- Holy Cross (1959) Assistant; Lowell / Quincy Giants (1968–1969) Assistant

Awards and highlights
- 4× AFL All-Star (1961, 1963–1965); 4× Second-team All-AFL (1960–1962, 1964); Boston Patriots All-1960s Team; New England Patriots Hall of Fame; New England Patriots No. 89 retired

Career NFL/AFL statistics
- Fumble recoveries: 6
- Interceptions: 1
- Sacks: 17.5
- Stats at Pro Football Reference

Robert Henry Dee (May 18, 1933 – April 18, 1979) was an American professional football player who was a defensive end in the National Football League (NFL) and the American Football League (AFL).

== Biography ==
Dee was a three-sport letterman at the College of the Holy Cross. After graduating, he joined the United States Marine Corps and played for the Quantico Marines Devil Dogs football team during the 1956 season. After two years with the Washington Redskins in 1957–58, Dee returned to Holy Cross to tutor the team's linemen. In 1960, he was one of the first players signed by the Boston Patriots of the AFL. He became an ironman of the American Football League who never missed a game during his career, starting 112 consecutive games.

Despite equipment improvements over the years, Dee was a superstitious player who chose to wear the same helmet throughout his career (105 of 112 games). Dee etched his name in the history books by scoring the first points in American Football League history, scoring a touchdown when he dove onto a fumble by Bills QB Tommy O'Connell (father of former Boston Bruins GM Mike O'Connell) the end zone in the second quarter of the league's first-ever exhibition game, a contest between the Patriots and the Bills on July 30, 1960. He was voted to four American Football League All-Star teams (1961, 1963–65) and is a member of the Patriots All-1960s (AFL) Team. Dee recorded 33 QB sacks (not including his strip sack of Tommy O'Connell in the AFL's first Exhibition Game).

Dee sacked Frank Tripucka, Al Dorow, Hunter Enis, Jacky Lee, MC Reynolds, Randy Duncan, Cotton Davidson, George Blanda, Jack Kemp, Johnny Green, John Hadl, Tobin Rote, Len Dawson, Eddie Wilson, Dick Wood, Joe Namath, Tom Flores, Rick Norton and Bob Griese and recovered fumbles by Al Carmichael, Art Baker, Wayne Crow, Jacky Lee, Paul Lowe, Bill Tobin, Wray Carlton & Max Chobian.

He had two interceptions in the Patriots 26–8 Eastern Divisional Playoff Game win over the Buffalo Bills. In that game, he wore one sneaker and one football shoe with spikes, which made him maneuver better in the snow in the game played at War Memorial Stadium on December 28, 1963.

On July 22, 1968, Dee announced his retirement from professional football, citing a business opportunity that was "too good to resist." Dee died of a heart attack in 1979 while on a business trip. He was awarded a game ball for his outstanding performance in the Patriots 34–17 win over the Houston Oilers on November 29, 1964. He was inducted in the Patriots Hall of Fame on August 18, 1993. In recognition of his accomplishments on the field, the Patriots retired his number (89).
