= Mel Branch =

American football player (1937–1992)

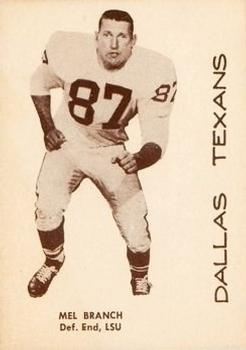
- Branch c. 1960

No. 87, 86
- Position: Defensive end

Personal information
- Born: February 15, 1937; Leesville, Louisiana, U.S.
- Died: April 21, 1992 (aged 55); DeRidder, Louisiana, U.S.
- Listed height: 6 ft 2 in (1.88 m)
- Listed weight: 230 lb (104 kg)

Career information
- High school: DeRidder
- College: LSU
- NFL draft: 1960: 10th round, 118th overall pick
- AFL draft: 1960

Career history
- Dallas Texans / Kansas City Chiefs (1960–1965); Miami Dolphins (1966–1968)

Awards and highlights
- AFL champion (1962); 2× First-team All-AFL (1960, 1962); Second-team All-AFL (1963); 3× AFL All-Star (1961–1963); AFL sacks co-leader (1960); National champion (1958)

Career AFL statistics
- Sacks: 57
- Fumble recoveries: 3
- Games played: 126
- Games started: 103
- Stats at Pro Football Reference

Melvin Leroy Branch (February 15, 1937 – April 21, 1992) was an American football defensive end who played for the Dallas Texans / Kansas City Chiefs and the Miami Dolphins in the American Football League (AFL).

While playing college football for the LSU Tigers, he was a member of the "Chinese Bandits" defense for the 1958 national champion team, and a starter for the Texans in their victory over the Houston Oilers in the longest professional football game played up to that time, the 1962 AFL Championship Game.

== See also ==
- List of American Football League players
