= Dick McCabe (American football) =

American football player and coach (1933–1983)

Richie McCabe
No. 24, 22, 0, 25, 45
- Position: Safety

Personal information
- Born: March 12, 1933; Pittsburgh, Pennsylvania, U.S.
- Died: January 4, 1983 (aged 49); Denver, Colorado, U.S.
- Listed height: 6 ft 1 in (1.85 m)
- Listed weight: 185 lb (84 kg)

Career information
- High school: North Catholic (Cranberry Township, Pennsylvania)
- College: Pittsburgh
- NFL draft: 1955: 22nd round, 258th overall pick

Career history

Playing
- Pittsburgh Steelers (1955, 1957–1958); Washington Redskins (1959); Buffalo Bills (1960–1961)

Coaching
- Buffalo Bills (1966-1968) Defensive backs; Oakland Raiders (1969-1970) Defensive backs; Cleveland Browns (1971–1973) Defensive backs; Cleveland Browns (1974–1975) Defensive coordinator; Buffalo Bills (1976–1977) Defensive coordinator; Denver Broncos (1978–1982) Defensive backs

Awards and highlights
- First-team All-AFL (1960)

Career NFL/AFL statistics
- Interceptions: 9
- Fumble recoveries: 3
- Total touchdowns: 1
- Stats at Pro Football Reference
- Coaching profile at Pro Football Reference

Richard Paul McCabe (March 12, 1933 – January 4, 1983) was an American football safety who played college football at the University of Pittsburgh. McCabe played in the National Football League (NFL) for the Pittsburgh Steelers and the Washington Redskins. He also played in the American Football League (AFL) for the Buffalo Bills, making the Sporting News' AFL All-League team in 1960. He finished his playing career with the Bills in 1961, but he returned to the team in 1966 as defensive backfield coach. He was born in Pittsburgh, Pennsylvania.

== See also ==
- List of American Football League players
