= Don Allen (American football) =

American football player (1939–2024)

No. 24
- Position: Fullback

Personal information
- Listed height: 6 ft 0 in (1.83 m)
- Listed weight: 200 lb (91 kg)

Career information
- High school: New London (TX)
- College: Texas
- NFL draft: 1960: undrafted

Career history
- Denver Broncos (1960)

Awards and highlights
- Southwest Conference Champion - 1959

Career NFL statistics
- Games played: 10
- Rushing attempts-yards: 30-18
- Receptions-yards: 5-34
- Touchdowns: 1
- Stats at Pro Football Reference

Don Allen (1938–2024) was an American professional football player who was a fullback for the Denver Broncosin the American Football League (AFL) in 1960. He was from New London, Texas.

== College career ==
Allen played college football for the Texas Longhorns from 1957 to 1959 and was a team captain of the 1959 Longhorn football team that won the Southwest Conference Championship. In 1957, he helped the team finish ranked 11th and play in the 1958 Sugar Bowl. In 1959 the Longhorns shared the conference championship with Arkansas and represented the conference in the Cotton Bowl, which it lost to Syracuse.

== Professional career ==
Allen was signed as free agent and played for the Denver Broncos in the AFL's 1960 season. Allen died in Porter, Texas, on March 13, 2024, at the age of 84.

== See also ==
- List of American Football League players
