= Blanche Martin =

American football player (1937–2026)

Profile
- Position: Fullback

Personal information
- Born: January 16, 1937; Millhaven, Georgia, U.S.
- Died: November 7, 2026 (aged 89); Lansing, Michigan, U.S.
- Listed height: 6 ft 0 in (1.83 m)
- Listed weight: 195 lb (88 kg)

Career information
- High school: River Rouge (Michigan)
- College: Michigan State
- NFL draft: 1959: 4th round, 43rd overall pick
- AFL draft: 1960: 2nd round

Career history
- Los Angeles Chargers (1960); New York Titans (1960)

Career AFL statistics
- Rushing yards: 58
- Rushing average: 3.2
- Receptions: 4
- Receiving yards: 23
- Total touchdowns: 1
- Stats at Pro Football Reference

Blanche Martin (January 16, 1937 – November 7, 2026) was an American professional football player who was a fullback for one season with the Los Angeles Chargers and New York Titans of the American Football League (AFL). He played college football for the Michigan State Spartans.

== Early life and college career ==
Martin attended River Rouge High School where he excelled in football, baseball, basketball, and track. He helped the basketball team to two state titles and received all-state honors.

Martin played primarily halfback and fullback, in college for Michigan State winning a national championship (as determined by the Dunkel Index) in 1957. That season, Martin rushed for a career-high 528-yards and scored five rushing touchdowns. He led the Spartans with 913 all-purpose yards and was named to the All Big Ten third team. Martin also returned kicks and punts, punted, and played defensive back. Martin missed the 1958 season with a knee injury, but despite being drafted in the fourth round of the 1959 NFL Draft by the Los Angles Rams, he returned to school to play one final season. As a senior he won the team's Potsy Ross Award (top scholar-athlete) along with the Danziger Award (top player from Detroit area). He also played in the East-West Shrine Bowl.

Martin excelled in the classroom, as well, earning first-team Academic All-America honors in 1957. He was named honorary captain of the 1958 Academic All-America Team and was a two-time Academic All-Big Ten honoree, as well. He graduated from Michigan State in 1959 with a degree in math and physical science.

== Professional career ==
Martin was drafted by the New York Titans in 1960 AFL Draft and played four games for the team before suffering another knee injury. He subsequently signed with the Los Angeles Chargers, playing nine more games and scoring his only professional touchdown, an 11-yard pass reception from Jack Kemp, part of a 17-point fourth quarter 50–43 comeback victory over his former team, the Titans. Blanche played special teams from the Chargers in the 1960 AFL Championship, a 24–16 loss to the Houston Oilers.

== Later career and death ==
After retiring from football, Martin received his doctorate degree in dentistry in 1967 from the University of Detroit Dental School and practiced as a dentist in East Lansing for more than 40 years. He was elected to the Michigan State University Board of trustees in 1969 and served until 1984. He chaired the board from 1974 to 1976.

Martin died on November 7, 2026, at the age of 89.
