= Volney Peters =

American football player (1928–2015)

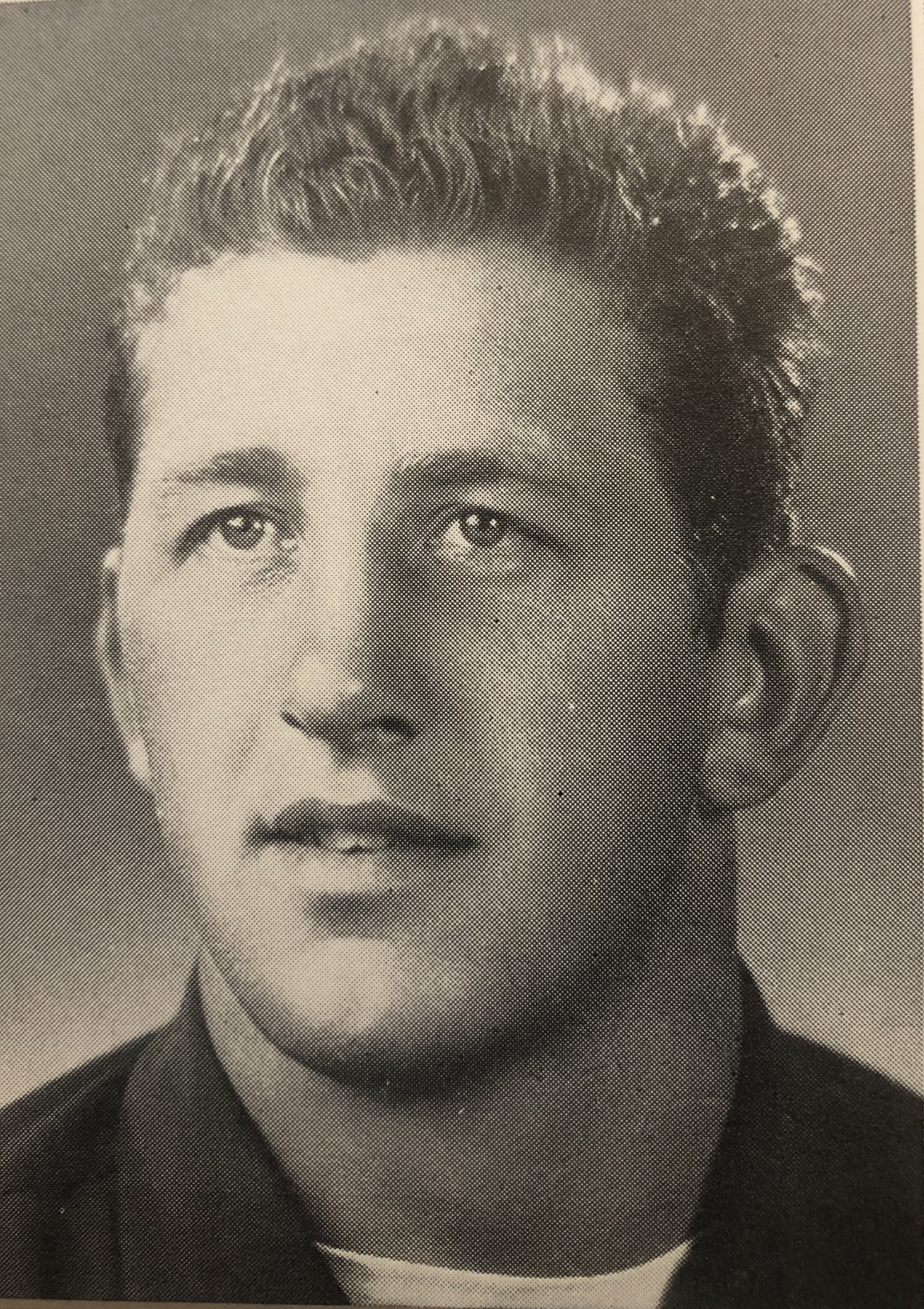
- Peters at USC c. 1949

No. 76, 79, 70
- Positions: Defensive tackle, defensive end, tackle

Personal information
- Born: January 1, 1928; Minneapolis, Minnesota, U.S.
- Died: December 28, 2015 (aged 87); Antioch, California, U.S.
- Listed height: 6 ft 4 in (1.93 m)
- Listed weight: 237 lb (108 kg)

Career information
- High school: Hoover (San Diego, California)
- College: USC
- NFL draft: 1951: 13th round, 151st overall pick

Career history
- Chicago Cardinals (1952–1953); Washington Redskins (1954–1957); Philadelphia Eagles (1958); Los Angeles Chargers (1960); Oakland Raiders (1961)

Awards and highlights
- Pro Bowl (1955); TSN All-AFL (1960); AFL All-Star (1960); First-team All-PCC (1950)

Career NFL/AFL statistics
- Fumble recoveries: 5
- Total touchdowns: 1
- Sacks: 1
- Stats at Pro Football Reference

Volney Monroe Peters (January 1, 1928 – December 28, 2015) was an American professional football player who was a defensive tackle and defensive end in the National Football League (NFL) and American Football League (AFL). He played college football for the USC Trojans.

== Early life ==
Peters graduated from Hoover High School in San Diego in 1947.

== Career ==
=== College ===
Peters attended Compton Community College and then was a two-way lineman for three years at the University of Southern California. As a senior, he was a first-team All-Pacific Coast Conference selection and was named to the 1951 East–West Shrine Game first team and the 1951 College All Stars Hula Bowl first team. Peters established a USC career record for minutes played.

=== Professional ===
After a brief time in the Marine Corps, Peters played in the NFL from 1952 to 1958. He was selected by the Chicago Cardinals in the 13th round of the 1951 NFL draft. Three years later, he was traded to the Washington Redskins in return for a fourth-round draft pick. He also spent one season with the Philadelphia Eagles.

Peters retired briefly before Los Angeles Chargers coach Sid Gillman convinced him to join the American Football League team in the 1960 season, the first for the league. He finished his career with the Oakland Raiders.

Peters was a 1956 NFL Pro Bowl pick and was named to the Sporting News 1960 All-AFL team.

In 2006, Peters was inducted into the San Diego Hall of Champions Breitbard Hall of Fame.

== Death ==
Peters died on December 28, 2015.

== See also ==
- List of American Football League players
