= Howie Ferguson =

American football player (1930–2005)

- 1959 Howie Ferguson football card

No. 37
- Positions: Fullback, halfback

Personal information
- Born: August 5, 1930; New Iberia, Louisiana, U.S.
- Died: December 18, 2005 (aged 75); New Iberia, Louisiana, U.S.
- Listed height: 6 ft 2 in (1.88 m)
- Listed weight: 218 lb (99 kg)

Career information
- High school: New Iberia
- College: None
- NFL draft: 1952: undrafted

Career history
- Green Bay Packers (1953–1958); Los Angeles Chargers (1960)

Awards and highlights
- Pro Bowl (1955); Green Bay Packers Hall of Fame

Career NFL/AFL statistics
- Rushing yards: 2,558
- Rushing average: 3.8
- Receptions: 148
- Receiving yards: 1,247
- Total touchdowns: 13
- Stats at Pro Football Reference

Howard Ferguson Jr. (August 5, 1930 – December 18, 2005) was an American professional football player. He played as a fullback and halfback for six seasons in the National Football League (NFL) with the Green Bay Packers and one season in the American Football League (AFL) with the Los Angeles Chargers. He was inducted into the Green Bay Packers Hall of Fame.

== Biography ==
Ferguson grew up in Louisiana, where he competed in football, basketball, baseball, and boxing at New Iberia High School. He enlisted in the Navy on Jan. 8, 1948 and served during the Korean War as a member of the frogman underwater demolition team. During the off-season, he worked as an oil field worker in New Iberia. Although he never played college football, Ferguson was discovered while playing football for the Navy in California by a scout for the NFL's Los Angeles Rams. He had played football with the Navy League Amphibian Division and was an MVP, earning second-team All-Navy honors two years in a row.) After playing four years of service football, the Navy discharged Ferguson on Jan. 7, 1952, he signed with the Los Angeles Rams on June 11 and was waived on Sept. 19. The Rams signed him, but he was released prior to the 1952 season and then was signed by the Green Bay Packers as a free agent in 1953. The 6'2", 210-pound Ferguson gained 2,120 yards rushing and 1,079 yards receiving with the Packers between 1953 and 1958.

In 1955, Ferguson had over 1,000 yards combined rushing and receiving for the Packers, earning him a spot on the Pro Bowl roster as a fullback alongside Heisman Trophy winner and NFL Rookie of the Year Alan Ameche of the Baltimore Colts. Ferguson retired in 1959 after multiple injuries but had a brief comeback in 1960 during the inaugural season of the Los Angeles Chargers of the American Football League (AFL). In 1974 Howard Ferguson was inducted into the Green Bay Packers Hall of Fame.

== See also ==
- List of American Football League players
