= Royce Womble =

American football player (1931–2016)

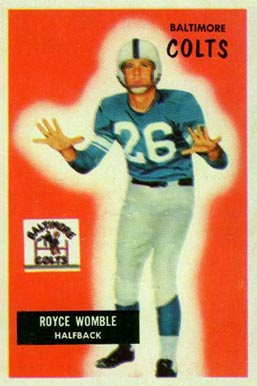
- Womble on a 1955 Bowman football card

No. 26, 28
- Position: Running back

Personal information
- Born: August 12, 1931; Webb, Texas, U.S.
- Died: November 30, 2016 (aged 85); Mansfield, Texas, U.S.
- Listed height: 6 ft 0 in (1.83 m)
- Listed weight: 185 lb (84 kg)

Career information
- High school: Mansfield
- College: North Texas (1949–1950)
- NFL draft: 1954: undrafted

Career history
- Baltimore Colts (1954–1957); Los Angeles Chargers (1960)

Career NFL/AFL statistics
- Rushing yards: 266
- Rushing average: 2.9
- Receptions: 79
- Receiving yards: 917
- Total touchdowns: 9
- Stats at Pro Football Reference

Royce Cullen Womble (August 12, 1931 – November 30, 2016) was an American football running back who played in the National Football League (NFL) and the American Football League (AFL). He played five seasons for the NFL's Baltimore Colts and the AFL's Los Angeles Chargers. He died from complications of Alzheimer's disease in 2016.
