= Johnny Pyeatt =

American football player (1933–2020)

Profile
- Position: Defensive back

Personal information
- Born: September 16, 1933; Florence, Arizona
- Died: April 23, 2020 (aged 86); Florence, Arizona
- Listed height: 6 ft 3 in (1.91 m)
- Listed weight: 204 lb (93 kg)

Career information
- High school: Florence (AZ)

Career history
- Denver Broncos (1960–1961)
- Stats at Pro Football Reference

John Joseph Pyeatt (September 16, 1933 – April 23, 2020) was an American football player who played for Denver Broncos of the American Football League (AFL) from 1960 to 1961.

He died of cancer on April 23, 2020, in Florence, Arizona at age 86.
