= Ralph Anderson (wide receiver) =

American football player (1935–1960)

No. 39, 79, 82
- Position: End

Personal information
- Born: September 2, 1935; Long Beach, California, U.S.
- Died: November 26, 1960 (aged 25); Los Angeles, California, U.S.
- Listed height: 6 ft 4 in (1.93 m)
- Listed weight: 223 lb (101 kg)

Career information
- High school: Alexander Hamilton (Los Angeles)
- College: Santa Monica College; Los Angeles State
- NFL draft: 1958: 9th round, 101st overall pick

Career history
- Chicago Bears (1958); Winnipeg Blue Bombers (1959); Los Angeles Chargers (1960)

Career NFL/AFL statistics
- Receptions: 55
- Receiving yards: 791
- Total touchdowns: 6
- Stats at Pro Football Reference

Ralph M. Anderson (September 2, 1935 – November 26, 1960) was an American college and professional football player. An offensive end, he played college football at Santa Monica College and Los Angeles State University, and played professionally in the American Football League (AFL) for the Los Angeles Chargers in 1960. His 44 receptions were good enough to lead the Chargers for the season. He played one game with the Winnipeg Blue Bombers of the Canadian Football League (CFL) in 1959.

== Death ==
Anderson died in Los Angeles on November 26, 1960, apparently due to diabetic complications. After going to the movies with his girlfriend and his teammate Ron Botchan, Anderson spent the night at the home of his girlfriend. She found him unresponsive the next morning and efforts to revive him were unsuccessful. Anderson had missed a game earlier in the 1960 season due to diabetic problems.

== See also ==
- List of gridiron football players who died during their careers

== See also ==
- List of American Football League players
