= Howard Clark (American football) =

American football player (born 1935)

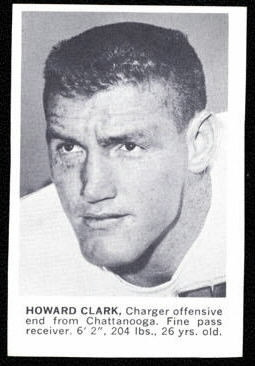

No. 87
- Position: Tight end

Personal information
- Born: August 23, 1935 (age 91); Dalton, Georgia, U.S.
- Listed height: 6 ft 2 in (1.88 m)
- Listed weight: 215 lb (98 kg)

Career information
- High school: Dalton
- College: Chattanooga

Career history
- Los Angeles / San Diego Chargers (1960–1961)
- Stats at Pro Football Reference

Howard Morris Clark (born August 23, 1935) is an American former professional football player who was a tight end with the Los Angeles / San Diego Chargers of the American Football League (AFL). He played college football for the Chattanooga Moccasins.
