= Dave Rolle =

American football player

Dave Simmons Rolle (March 22, 1937 – December 24, 2006) was an American professional football running back who played for the Denver Broncos of the American Football League. He played college football for the Oklahoma Sooners.

== Biography ==
Rolle was born in Poteau, Oklahoma on March 22, 1937. He attended Poteau schools and was an All-State running back for the Poteau High School Pirates in both 1953 and 1954. He earned the nickname "the streak" while helping lead the Pirates to the 1953 state semifinals. In his final game in a Pirate uniform, he had four touchdowns in a 34–7 win over Tahlequah. The Pirates went 7–1–1 that season and because there were no state playoffs in 1954, the team did not get a chance to repeat its playoff success from a year prior.

Rolle attended the University of Oklahoma, where he was a three-time letterwinner at fullback, helping the Sooners win a record 47 consecutive games and win two national championships. Playing in the same backfield as future NFL players Tommy McDonald, Prentice Gautt, Clendon Thomas and Bobby Boyd, Rolle ran for over 400 yards across his three seasons at Oklahoma.

On March 24, 1959, Rolle signed with the Edmonton Eskimos of the Canadian Football League. However, he was released on August 20, 1959, before playing in any games. A year later, Rolle signed with the expansion Denver Broncos of the American Football League. Rolle rushed for a team-leading 501 yards and two touchdowns and added 21 catches for 122 yards and a touchdown as a rookie in 1960. But, he suffered a broken arm during training camp in 1961 and missed the entire season.

A year later, he went to work as a claims analyst with the Oklahoma Insurance Commissioner's Office. He returned to school and earned a law degree from Oklahoma City University. In 1967, he was appointed assistant counsel for Insurance Commissioner Joe B. Hunt. Rolle died on December 24, 2006 in Denton, Texas at the age of 69.
