= Dean Griffing =

American gridiron football player, coach, and executive

Profile
- Position: Center

Personal information
- Born: May 17, 1915; St. George, Kansas, U.S.
- Died: February 9, 1998 (aged 82); Sarasota, Florida, U.S.

Career information
- College: Kansas State

Career history
- 1936–1943: Regina Roughriders
- 1944: Toronto Balmy Beach Beachers
- 1945–1947: Calgary Stampeders

Awards and highlights
- 3× CFL West All-Star (1937, 1938, 1940)
- Canadian Football Hall of Fame (Class of 1965)

Orrin Dean Griffing (1915 – 1998) was an American gridiron football player, coach, and executive. He played as a center and linebacker for the Kansas State University in 1933 and 1934, for the Regina Roughriders from 1936 to 1943, for Toronto Balmy Beach Beachers in 1944, and the Calgary Stampeders from 1945 to 1947; the last he also part owned. Griffing was inducted into the Canadian Football Hall of Fame in 1965. He coached Saskatchewan during the mid-1950s. In 1960, Griffing became the first general manager of the Denver Broncos, selected in part because of his known and needed frugality. He was responsible for the team's brown and yellow uniform and socks, which he had bought secondhand from a high school all-star game. He later worked as special assignment scout for the Chicago Bears.

Griffing died in 1998 in Sarasota, Florida.
