= 1961 All-AFL Team =

Official list of the best AFL players of 1961

The 1961 American Football League All-League Team was selected after the 1961 American Football League season by five separate entities: current AFL players, the Associated Press (AP), United Press International (UPI), New York Daily News (NY), and The Sporting News (SN), and was published by The Sporting News. Each selector chose a first team at each position and second team at select positions.

== Offense and defense ==
Offense
Position	First team	Second team
Quarterback	George Blanda, Houston Oilers (AFL, AP, NY, SN, UPI)	Jack Kemp, San Diego Chargers (AFL, NY, UPI)
Halfback	Billy Cannon, Houston Oilers (AFL, AP, NY, SN, UPI); Abner Haynes, Dallas Texans (AFL, NY, SN, UPI)	Paul Lowe, San Diego Chargers (AFL, NY, UPI); Donnie Stone, Denver Broncos (NY)
Fullback	Bill Mathis, New York Titans (AFL, AP, NY, SN, UPI)	Charlie Tolar, Houston Oilers (AFL, UPI); Alan Miller, Oakland Raiders (NY)
Wide receiver	Charlie Hennigan, Houston Oilers (AFL, AP, NY, SN, UPI); Lionel Taylor, Denver Broncos (AFL, AP, NY, UPI); Bill Groman, Houston Oilers (AP, SN)	Gino Cappelletti, Boston Patriots (AFL, NY, UPI); Bill Groman, Houston Oilers (NY, UPI)
Tackle	Al Jamison, Houston Oilers (AFL, AP, NY, SN, UPI); Ron Mix, San Diego Chargers (AFL, AP, NY, UPI); Jerry Cornelison, Dallas Texans (SN)	Ken Rice, Buffalo Bills (AFL, NY, UPI); Jerry Cornelison, Dallas Texans (UPI); Jerry DeLucca, Boston Patriots (AFL); Ernie Wright, San Diego Chargers (NY)
Guard	Bob Mischak, New York Titans (AFL, AP, NY, SN, UPI); Tony Sardisco, Boston Patriots (NY, UPI); Ken Adamson, Denver Broncos (AP); Charley Leo, Boston Patriots (AFL); Wayne Hawkins, Oakland Raiders (SN)	Ken Adamson, Denver Broncos (AFL, NY, UPI); Billy Krisher, Dallas Texans (NY, UPI); Bob Talamini, Houston Oilers (AFL, UPI)
Center	Jim Otto, Oakland Raiders (AFL, AP, NY, SN, UPI)	Don Rogers, San Diego Chargers (NY, UPI); Bob Schmidt, Houston Oilers (AFL)

Defense
Position	First team	Second team
Defensive end	Earl Faison, San Diego Chargers (AFL, AP, NY, SN, UPI); Ron Nery, San Diego Chargers (AP, SN); LaVerne Torczon, Buffalo Bills (NY, UPI); Don Floyd, Houston Oilers (AFL)	Ron Nery, San Diego Chargers (AP, SN); Bob Dee, Boston Patriots (AFL); Larry Eisenhauer, Boston Patriots (NY); LaVerne Torczon, Buffalo Bills (AFL); Sid Youngelman, New York Titans (UPI)
Defensive tackle	Bud McFadin, Denver Broncos (AFL, AP, NY, SN, UPI); Ernie Ladd, San Diego Chargers (AP, NY, SN, UPI); Chuck McMurtry, Buffalo Bills (AFL)	Bill Hudson, San Diego Chargers (NY, UPI); Ed Husmann, Houston Oilers (NY, UPI); Jim Lee Hunt, Boston Patriots (AFL); Ernie Ladd, San Diego Chargers (AFL)
Middle linebacker	Sherrill Headrick, Dallas Texans (AFL, AP, NY, SN, UPI); Archie Matsos, Buffalo Bills (AFL, NY); Chuck Allen, San Diego Chargers (AFL)	Chuck Allen, San Diego Chargers (NY); Archie Matsos, Buffalo Bills (UPI)
Outside linebacker	Larry Grantham, New York Titans (AP, NY, SN, UPI); Tom Addison, Boston Patriots (AP, SN, UPI)	E.J. Holub, Dallas Texans (AFL, NY, UPI); Ralph Felton, Buffalo Bills (UPI); Larry Grantham, New York Titans (AFL)
Cornerback	Dick Harris, San Diego Chargers (AFL, AP, NY, SN, UPI); Tony Banfield, Houston Oilers (AFL, AP, SN, UPI); Mark Johnston, Houston Oilers (NY)	Claude Gibson, San Diego Chargers (NY, UPI); Fred Williamson, Oakland Raiders (AFL, UPI); Tony Banfield, Houston Oilers (NY)
Safety	Charlie McNeil, San Diego Chargers, (AFL, AP, NY, SN, UPI); Bill Atkins, Buffalo Bills (NY, SN, UPI); Dave Webster, Dallas Texans (AFL, AP)	Goose Gonsoulin, Denver Broncos (AFL, UPI); Jim Norton, Houston Oilers (NY, UPI); Bill Atkins, Buffalo Bills (AFL); Dick Felt, New York Titans (AFL); Ross O'Hanley, Boston Patriots (NY)

== Other selections ==
Return specialist: Larry Garron, Boston Patriots (AFL-2)
