= 1961 Denver Broncos season =

American football team season

- General manager: Dean Griffing
- Head coach: Frank Filchock
- Home stadium: Bears Stadium

Results
- Record: 3–11
- Division place: 3rd AFL Western
- Playoffs: Did not qualify

The 1961 Denver Broncos season was the team's second year in the American Football League. Led by head coach Frank Filchock, the Broncos recorded three wins and eleven losses, finishing third in the AFL's Western Division.

The 1961 Broncos set a modern pro football record with 68 giveaways, more than any other team in AFL or NFL history.

== Offseason ==
=== AFL draft ===
1961 Denver Broncos draft
Round	Pick	Player	Position	College	Notes
1	4	Bob Gaiters	HB	New Mexico State	Signed with New York Giants (NFL)
2	11	Jerry Hill	RB	Wyoming	Signed with Baltimore Colts (NFL)
3	20	Bo Strange	C	LSU	
4	26	Sonny Davis	LB	Baylor	Signed with Dallas Cowboys (NFL)
4	27	Ron McDole	DE	Nebraska	Signed with St. Louis Cardinals (NFL)
5	36	Charlie Cowan	T	New Mexico Highlands	Signed with Los Angeles Rams (NFL)
6	43	Dale Evans	HB	Kansas State	
7	49	Pat Patchen	E	Florida	
9	65	Phil Nugent	DB	Tulane	
10	73	Charley Sturgeon	HB	Kentucky	
11	81	John Simko	E	Augustana	
12	89	Jerry Miller	E	Howard Payne	
13	97	Ron Greene	G	Washington State	
14	105	Bill Cooper	FB	Muskingum	Signed with San Francisco 49ers (NFL)
15	113	Willie Crafts	G	Texas A&I	
16	121	Jim Larkin	T	Hillsdale	
17	129	Chuck Weiss	FB	Colorado	
18	137	Chick Graning	HB	Georgia Tech	
19	145	John Hobbs	G	Maryland State	
20	153	Buck McLeod	T	Baylor	
21	161	Jim Morgan	HB	Iowa State	
22	169	Tom Hackler	E	Tennessee Tech	
23	177	Tom Jewel	T	Idaho State	
24	185	E. A. Sims	E	New Mexico State	
25	193	Pete Samms	T	Central State (OK)	
26	201	Sam Smith	HB	North Alabama	
27	209	Don Olson	HB	Nebraska	
28	217	Wayne Lee	G	Colorado State	
29	225	Archie Cobb	T	Nebraska	
30	233	Dave Mills	HB	Northeast Missouri State	
Made roster * Made at least one Pro Bowl during career

== Staff / Coaches ==
1961 Denver Broncos staff

Front office
- Majority Owner/Chairman of the Board of Directors - Gerald Phipps
- Minority Owner/President - Calvin Kunz
- General Manager – Dean Griffing

Head coach
- Head Coach – Frank Filchock

Assistant coaches

- Line coach – Dale Dodrill
- Assistant coach – Ken Carpenter

=== Roster ===
1961 Denver Broncos roster
Quarterbacks (QB): 16 George Herring P; 18 Frank Tripucka; Running backs (RB): 22 David Ames; 33 Fred Bukaty; 21 Gene Mingo K; 34 Donnie Stone; Wide receivers (WR): 42 Al Frazier; 88 Gene Prebola; Tight ends (TE): 87 Lionel Taylor	Offensive linemen (OL): 60 Ken Adamson G; 52 Jim Barton C; 75 Eldon Danenhauer T; 63 Buzz Guy G; 77 Carl Larpenter G; 51 Mike Nichols C; 72 Jerry Strum T; Defensive linemen (DL): 66 John Cash DE; 61 Chuck Gavin DE; 71 Art Hauser DT; 74 Gordy Holz DT; 73 Bob Konovsky DE; 64 Bud McFadin DT	Linebackers (LB): 53 Bob Hudson OLB; 50 Pat Lamberti MLB; 54 Wahoo McDaniel MLB; 67 Jackie Simpson OLB; 62 Jerry Stalcup OLB; 36 James Stinnette OLB/RB; Defensive backs (DB): 23 Goose Gonsoulin FS; 84 Jack Hill WR/K; 45 Jim McMillin CB; 41 Bob McNamara CB; 83 Johnny Pyeatt CB; Special teams (ST)	Reserve: 40 Al Carmichael WR (IR); 15 Phil Nugent S (IR); 63 Bill Roehnelt LB (Military); 35 Dave Rolle RB (IR); 65 Joe Young DE (IR); Rookies in italics 33 active, 4 reserve

== Regular season ==
Week	Date	Opponent	Result	Record	Venue	Attendance	Recap
1	September 10	at Buffalo Bills	**W** 22–10	1–0	War Memorial Stadium	16,636	Recap
2	September 16	at Boston Patriots	**L** 17–45	1–1	Boston University Field	14,479	Recap
3	September 24	at New York Titans	**L** 28–35	1–2	Polo Grounds	14,381	Recap
4	October 1	at **Oakland Raiders**	**L** 19–33	1–3	Candlestick Park	8,361	Recap
5	October 8	**Dallas Texans**	**L** 12–19	1–4	Bears Stadium	14,500	Recap
6	October 15	**Oakland Raiders**	**W** 27–24	2–4	Bears Stadium	11,129	Recap
7	October 22	New York Titans	**W** 27–10	3–4	Bears Stadium	12,508	Recap
8	October 29	at **San Diego Chargers**	**L** 0–37	3–5	Balboa Stadium	32,584	Recap
9	November 5	Houston Oilers	**L** 14–55	3–6	Bears Stadium	11,564	Recap
10	November 12	**San Diego Chargers**	**L** 16–19	3–7	Bears Stadium	7,859	Recap
11	November 19	Buffalo Bills	**L** 10–23	3–8	Bears Stadium	7,645	Recap
12	November 26	at Houston Oilers	**L** 14–45	3–9	Jeppesen Stadium	27,874	Recap
13	December 3	Boston Patriots	**L** 24–28	3–10	Bears Stadium	9,303	Recap
14	December 10	at **Dallas Texans**	**L** 21–49	3–11	Cotton Bowl	8,000	Recap
15	Bye						
Note: Intra-division opponents are in **bold** text.

== Standings ==
AFL Western Division
	W	L	T	PCT	DIV	PF	PA	STK
San Diego Chargers	12	2	0	.857	6–0	396	219	L1
Dallas Texans	6	8	0	.429	4–2	334	343	W2
Denver Broncos	3	11	0	.214	1–5	251	432	L7
Oakland Raiders	2	12	0	.143	1–5	237	458	L6

Note: Tie games were not officially counted in the standings in the AFL.
