= 1961 Houston Oilers season =

NFL team season

- Owner: Bud Adams
- General manager: Don Suman
- Head coach: Lou Rymkus (1–3–1, fired) and Wally Lemm (9–0)
- Home stadium: Jeppesen Stadium

Results
- Record: 10–3–1
- Division place: 1st AFL Eastern
- Playoffs: Won AFL Championship (at Chargers) 10–3

The 1961 Houston Oilers season was the second season for the Houston Oilers as a professional American football franchise; For the second consecutive season, the Oilers scored a triumph in the AFL championship game over the San Diego Chargers (12–2), the Western Division champions.

The Oilers started slowly in 1961, with a 1–3–1 record. After a tie on October 13 with the Boston Patriots, head coach Lou Rymkus was fired by owner Bud Adams. Wally Lemm was hired, and the team went undefeated for the remainder of the season, including the championship game, a winning streak of ten games.

The Oilers set the AFL record for points scored in 1961, with 513 (36.6 points per game). They also set an American Football League record with a +271 point differential, by allowing only 242 points. The 1961 Oilers are the only team in AFL or NFL history to score 45 points or more six times in a single season.

== Offseason ==
On January 14, end Willard Dewveall played out his option with the Chicago Bears of the NFL and joined the Oilers. He became the first player to move deliberately from one league to another. Dewveall was the only one to move between leagues for five years, until placekicker Pete Gogolak moved from the Buffalo Bills to the New York Giants of the NFL in 1966.

=== AFL Draft ===
- Houston Oilers draft picks (Selected eighth)

Round	Player	Position	College
1	Mike Ditka	Offensive End	Pittsburgh
2	Tom Goode	Center	Mississippi State
3	Walter Suggs ^{1}	Tackle	Mississippi State
4	Bobby Walden	Halfback	Georgia
5	Monte Lee	Linebacker	Texas
6	Jake Gibbs	Quarterback	Mississippi
7	Dick Reynolds	Tackle	North Carolina State
8	Houston Antwine ^{1,2}	Guard	Southern Illinois
9	Ralph White	Tackle	Bowling Green
10	Charles Lee	Center	Iowa
11	Robert Bird	Guard	Bowling Green
12	Bob McLeod	Offensive End	Abilene Christian
13	Gerald Hinton	Guard	Louisiana Tech
14	Jimmy King	Tackle	Clemson
15	Dennis Ferriter	Center	Marquette
16	Larry Wood	Halfback	Northwestern
17	Sam Fewell	Tackle	South Carolina
18	Mike Grimsley	Halfback	Michigan State
19	Myron Pearson	Halfback	Colorado
20	Lewis Johnson	Halfback	Florida A&M
21	Ron Miller	Quarterback	Wisconsin
22	Bob Kelly	Offensive End	New Mexico State
23	James Anderson	Fullback	Mississippi
24	Ken Gregory	Offensive End	Whittier
25	Jack Kreider	Halfback	Tulsa
26	Don Fuell	Quarterback	Mississippi Southern
27	Boyd King	Center	Rice
28	John Frongillo	Center	Baylor
29	Tom Lewis	Offensive End	Wake Forest
29	Errol Linden	Defensive end	Houston
30	Jim Stroud	Tackle	Rice

=== Roster ===
1961 Houston Oilers roster
Quarterbacks: 16 George Blanda K; 15 Jacky Lee; Running backs: 20 Billy Cannon; 46 Claude King; 32 Dave Smith; 44 Charley Tolar; Wide receivers: 88 Willard Dewveall; 89 Bill Groman; 87 Charley Hennigan; Tight ends: 81 Bob McLeod; 86 John White	Offensive linemen: 70 Al Jamison T; 73 Bob Kelly T; 77 Rich Michael T; 64 Willis Perkins G; 52 Bob Schmidt C; 61 Bob Talamini G; 63 Hogan Wharton G; Defensive linemen: 80 Dalva Allen DE; 75 Don Floyd DE; 62 Dick Frey DE; 82 Ed Husmann DT; 74 George Shirkey DT; 79 Orville Trask DT	Linebackers: 37 Ron Botchan OLB; 31 Doug Cline OLB; 30 Mike Dukes OLB; 34 Jack Laraway OLB; 50 Dennit Morris MLB; Defensive backs: 40 Tony Banfield CB; 27 Fred Glick FS; 41 Mark Johnston CB; 25 Gene Jones DB; 43 Jim Norton SS/P; 24 Julian Spence FS	Reserve lists: -- Dan Lanphear DE (DNR); 12 Charlie Milstead S Retired; 22 Gary Wisener CB (IR); rookies in italics

== Standings ==
AFL Eastern Division
	W	L	T	PCT	DIV	PF	PA	STK
Houston Oilers	10	3	1	.769	4–1–1	513	242	W9
Boston Patriots	9	4	1	.692	2–3–1	413	313	W4
New York Titans	7	7	0	.500	3–3	301	390	L2
Buffalo Bills	6	8	0	.429	2–4	294	342	L1

Note: Tie games were not officially counted in the standings in the AFL.

=== Season schedule ===
Week	Date	Opponent	Result	Record	Venue	Attendance	Game Recap
1	September 9	Oakland Raiders	**W** 55–0	1–0	Jeppesen Stadium	16,231	Recap
2	Bye						
3	September 24	at San Diego Chargers	**L** 24–34	1–1	Balboa Stadium	29,210	Recap
4	October 1	at Dallas Texans	**L** 21–26	1–2	Cotton Bowl	28,000	Recap
5	October 8	**Buffalo Bills**	**L** 12–22	1–3	Jeppesen Stadium	22,761	Recap
6	October 13	at **Boston Patriots**	**T** 31–31	1–3–1	Boston University Field	15,070	Recap
7	October 22	Dallas Texans	**W** 38–7	2–3–1	Jeppesen Stadium	21,237	Recap
8	October 29	at **Buffalo Bills**	**W** 28–16	3–3–1	War Memorial Stadium	23,228	Recap
9	November 5	at Denver Broncos	**W** 55–14	4–3–1	Bears Stadium	11,564	Recap
10	November 12	**Boston Patriots**	**W** 27–15	5–3–1	Jeppesen Stadium	35,649	Recap
11	November 19	**New York Titans**	**W** 49–13	6–3–1	Jeppesen Stadium	33,428	Recap
12	November 26	Denver Broncos	**W** 45–14	7–3–1	Jeppesen Stadium	27,864	Recap
13	December 3	San Diego Chargers	**W** 33–13	8–3–1	Jeppesen Stadium	37,845	Recap
14	December 10	at **New York Titans**	**W** 48–21	9–3–1	Polo Grounds	9,462	Recap
15	December 17	at Oakland Raiders	**W** 47–16	10–3–1	Candlestick Park	4,821	Recap
Note: Intra-division opponents are in **bold** text.

== Postseason ==
Round	Date	Opponent	Result	Venue	Attendance	Recap
AFL Championship	December 24	at San Diego Chargers	W 10–3	Balboa Stadium	29,556	Recap

=== 1961 AFL Championship Game (Sunday, December 24, 1961): at San Diego Chargers ===
1961 AFL Championship Game: Houston Oilers 10 at San Diego Chargers 3 – Game summary

Quarter	1	2	3	4	Total
Oilers (1–0)	0	3	7	0	10
Chargers (0–1)	0	0	0	3	3

at Balboa Stadium • San Diego, California

- Date: December 24, 1961
- Game time: 3:30 p.m. CST
- Game attendance: 29,556
- TV announcers (ABC): Jack Buck (play-by-play), George Ratterman (color commentator) and Bob Neal (sideline reporter)

Team	Category	Player	Statistics
HOU	Passing		
HOU	Rushing		
HOU	Receiving		
SD	Passing		
SD	Rushing		
SD	Receiving		

Scoring summary

Quarter	Time	Drive			Team	Scoring information	Score	
Quarter	Time	Plays	Yards	TOP	Team	Scoring information	HOU	SD
2					Oilers	46-yard field goal by Blanda	3	0
3					Oilers	Cannon 35-yard touchdown reception from Blanda, Blanda kick good	10	0
4					Chargers	12-yard field goal by Blair	10	3
"TOP" = time of possession. For other American football terms, see Glossary of American football.							10	3

- Point spread: Oilers –5½
- Time of game:

Oilers	Game statistics	Chargers
18	First downs	15
33–96	Rushes–yards	20–79
160	Passing yards	226
18–41–6	Passes	17–32–4
0–0	Sacked–yards	0–49
160	Net passing yards	177
256	Total yards	256
7	Return yards	126
5–34.0	Punts	4–41.0
5–1	Fumbles–lost	2–2
5–68	Penalties–yards	10–106
	Time of possession	
