= 1961 San Diego Chargers season =

2nd season in franchise history, first in San Diego

- Owner: Barron Hilton
- General manager: Sid Gillman
- Head coach: Sid Gillman
- Home stadium: Balboa Stadium

Results
- Record: 12–2
- Division place: 1st Western Division
- Playoffs: Lost AFL Championship (vs. Oilers) 3–10
- All-AFL: 6: DE Earl Faison; CB Dick Harris; DT Ernie Ladd; S Charlie McNeil; T Ron Mix; DE Ron Nery
- AFL All-Stars: 11: DB-K George Blair; DE Earl Faison; CB Dick Harris; DT Bill Hudson; LB Emil Karas; QB Jack Kemp; FL Dave Kocourek; S Charlie McNeil; T Ron Mix; E Don Norton; T Ernie Wright

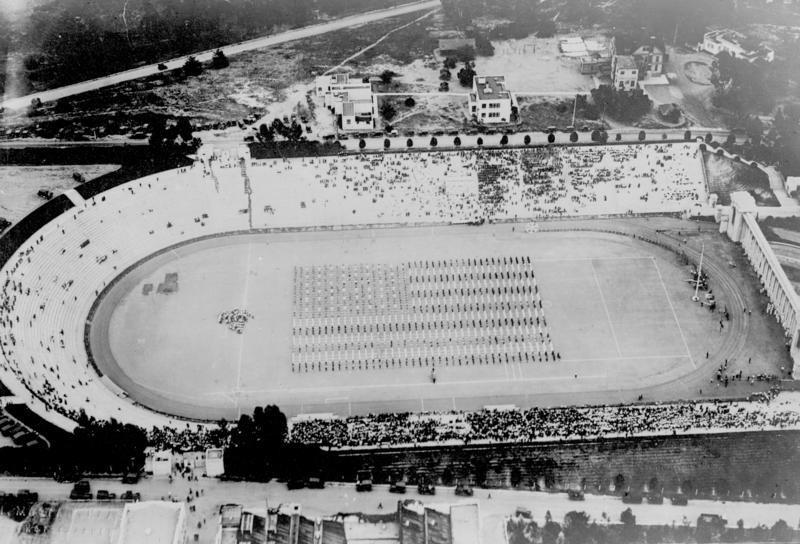
Balboa Stadium, as it appeared in the 1930s—its capacity was increased from 23,000 to 34,000 to accommodate the Chargers

The 1961 San Diego Chargers season was the team's second in the American Football League. Following a move from Los Angeles, it was the Chargers' first season in San Diego, where the team remained until returning to Los Angeles in 2017.

The Chargers won their first eleven games and clinched the Western Division by mid-November. They lost form in December, with only one victory in their final three regular season games, and finished at 12–2, six games ahead of runner-up Dallas. Like the previous season, the Chargers' season ended with a loss to the Houston Oilers in the AFL championship game, this time 10–3 at Balboa Stadium in San Diego.

San Diego's defense had a historic campaign, setting AFL/NFL records for most total takeaways (66), most interceptions (49), and most interceptions returned for touchdowns (9). All three of these records still stand as of 2022. Defensive backs Charlie McNeil, Bob Zeman, and Dick Harris were the biggest contributors to the interceptions record, with 24 between the three of them.

At the linebacker position, rookie Chuck Allen played well enough that he was named Rookie of the Year and Most Inspirational Player by his teammates, despite breaking his ankle early in November and missing the latter half of the season. Quarterback Jack Kemp was voted the Chargers' MVP. He passed for over 2,600 yards, and Dave Kocourek caught passes for over 1,000 yards. Kemp, however, struggled with interceptions as the season wore on, and threw four in the title game defeat.

== Offseason ==
=== Relocation ===
The Los Angeles Chargers struggled to attract fans throughout their opening season. For their first exhibition game, the attendance was 27,778, well short of the anticipated 45,000. Five days later, owner Barron Hilton professed both disappointment at a crowd of under 12,000, and hope for an increase once the regular season began, especially if Los Angeles fielded a winning team. In the event, the Chargers pulled under 18,000 for their regular season opener, peaked with 21,805 against the eventual AFL champion Oilers, and mustered fewer than 10,000 against Denver on December 11, the day they clinched their division.

The Chargers finished the season 10–4, yet averaged an attendance of just 15,768 over their seven regular-season home games. By contrast, the Los Angeles Rams of the NFL pulled in over 77,000 fans for a game late in a mediocre 4–7–1 campaign. The 1960 AFL Championship Game was moved from the Los Angeles Coliseum to Jeppesen Stadium, home of the opposing Houston Oilers. This move was made with the consent of the Chargers' head coach and general manager, Sid Gillman, amid fears that broadcasters might be put off by rows of empty seats in the showpiece game. Gillman later quipped, "It would have been the first championship game ever played for the personal amusement of bellhops and players' wives." Funding the team proved a major financial drain for Hilton, with losses estimated at $900,000 from its founding through to the end of the 1960 season.

With the Chargers failing to make an impact in Los Angeles, San Diego was rumoured as a likely alternative location for the team as early as December 1960, with the AFL Title game still to be played. Balboa Stadium was proposed as a venue; Hilton expressed concerns over the size of the stadium after surveying it early in January, but was impressed by the enthusiasm of city administration. Jack Murphy, a journalist with the San Diego Union, was instrumental in building local enthusiasm for the Chargers; by late January, advanced ticket sales stood at approximately 24,000. Hilton met with San Diego City Council on January 25, agreeing a contract that would see renovations to Balboa Stadium; its capacity was boosted from 23,000 to 34,000 by the construction of an upper deck, beginning in May 1961. The San Diego Chargers were officially born on February 10, when the AFL owners voted unanimously to allow the move.

=== AFL draft ===
The AFL conducted their draft for the 1961 season in the winter of 1960, with the first six rounds conducted on November 21–22, and the remaining twenty-four on December 5–6. In contrast to the largely randomised AFL draft of 1960, the 1961 edition employed a 30-round structure, with the Chargers choosing seventh in each round. Having received the Texans' sixth-round pick in a trade, they had 31 picks in total.

Despite having to compete with NFL clubs to secure the services of much of their draft class, the Chargers acquired several players who would start with them for years. Their first-round pick, Earl Faison, was keen to play in California, hoping for both better weather and a better racial climate than he had experienced at Indiana. He would go to the AFL All-Star game in each of his five full seasons in San Diego, and be voted a first-team All-Pro in four of them. San Diego also signed their second-round pick, running back Keith Lincoln, despite competition from the Chicago Bears and a Canadian team. Lincoln was persuaded by a higher salary, the presence of Gillman and, having played college football at Washington State, the opportunity to stay on the west coast. He would go on to play six seasons in San Diego, with four All-Star games, two first-team All-Pro selections, and an MVP performance in the 1963 AFL Championship Game.

Other successes came from further down the draft. Ernie Ladd, selected in the fifteen round, joined Faison on the defensive line. In five seasons with the Chargers, he appeared in four All-Star games, and was a three-time first-team All-Pro. In the next round, they chose defensive back Bud Whitehead, who would spend his entire eight-year career in San Diego. Linebacker Chuck Allen was selected by the Rams in the NFL draft. He chose to play in the AFL, feeling he would see more playing time in the newer league. Over the next nine seasons, he played in more than 100 games for the Chargers, and featured in two All-Star games.

San Diego also suffered numerous defeats in the bidding war with NFL clubs, including a notable pair of UCLA alumni who signed with the 49ers: Billy Kilmer, who went on to start at quarterback for Washington in Super Bowl VII, and Jimmy Johnson, who stayed in San Francisco for his entire sixteen-year career, and was enshrined in the Hall of Fame in 1994.

1961 San Diego Chargers draft
Round	Pick	Player	Position	College	Notes
1	7	Earl Faison *	Defensive end	Indiana	66th pick in NFL draft
2	15	Keith Lincoln *	Halfback	Washington State	61st pick in NFL draft
3	23	Marlin McKeever *	End	USC	23rd pick in NFL draft; signed by Los Angeles Rams
4	31	Jimmy Johnson †	Defensive back	UCLA	6th pick in NFL draft; signed by San Francisco 49ers
5	39	Billy Kilmer *	Quarterback	UCLA	11th pick in NFL draft; signed by San Francisco 49ers
6	47	Calvin Bird	Halfback	Kentucky	237th pick in NFL draft
6	47	Cliff Roberts	Tackle	Illinois	Traded to Oakland Raiders
7	55	Claude Gibson	Defensive back	North Carolina State	33rd pick in NFL draft
8	63	Charley Johnson *	Quarterback	New Mexico State	109th pick in NFL draft; signed by St. Louis Cardinals
9	71	Bob Scarpitto *	End	Notre Dame	
10	79	Willie Hector	Guard	College of Pacific	60th pick in NFL draft; signed by Los Angeles Rams
11	87	Greg Larson *	Center	Minnesota	81st pick in NFL draft; signed by New York Giants
12	95	Hezekiah Braxton	Fullback	Virginia Union	
13	103	Dale Messer	Fullback	Fresno State	52nd pick in NFL draft; signed by San Francisco 49ers
14	111	Billy Wilson	Tackle	Auburn	31st pick in NFL draft
15	119	Ernie Ladd *	Defensive tackle	Grambling	48th pick in NFL draft
16	127	Bud Whitehead	Defensive back	Florida State	
17	135	Reggie Carolan *	End	Idaho	102nd pick in NFL draft; joined the Chargers in 1962
18	143	Ed Dyas	Fullback	Auburn	62nd pick in NFL draft
19	151	Jack Espenship	Halfback	Florida	Signed by Montreal Alouettes
20	159	Mike Lucci	Center	Tennessee	69th pick in NFL draft; signed by Cleveland Browns
21	167	Gene Gaines	Halfback	UCLA	Signed by Montreal Alouettes
22	175	John Brown	Tackle	Syracuse	55th pick in NFL draft; signed by Cleveland Browns
23	183	Glenn Bass	Halfback	East Carolina	64th pick in NFL draft; traded to Buffalo Bills
24	191	Ben Balme	Guard	Yale	84th pick in NFL draft
25	199	Don Coffey	End	Memphis State	164th pick in NFL draft
26	207	Bill Kinnune	Guard	Washington	148th pick in NFL draft
27	215	Luther Hayes	End	USC	140th pick in NFL draft
28	223	Chuck Allen *	Guard	Washington	228th pick in NFL draft
29	231	Dan Ficca	Tackle	USC	53rd pick in NFL draft; traded to Oakland Raiders
30	239	Mike McKeever	Guard	USC	172nd pick in NFL draft
Made roster † Pro Football Hall of Fame * Made at least one AFL All-Star game or NFL Pro Bowl during career Played in the NFL in 1961

=== Departures and arrivals ===
Several of the 1960 Chargers squad did not join the team in their new city. Veteran kicker Ben Agajanian didn't want to move away from his business interests in Los Angeles, though he did help coach Lincoln, primarily a running back, as a potential replacement kicker. Guard Fred Cole had started every game the previous year, but retired to become an engineer. Gillman traded several players, including starting defensive tackle Volney Peters, in exchange for picks in the 1962 AFL draft. San Diego eventually made eleven selections in the first seven rounds of that draft.

While most of the Chargers' new recruits came to them through the draft, they did acquire a defensive tackle with two years' experience. Hank Schmidt had been cut by the NFL's 49ers in training camp; he was contacted by starting quarterback Jack Kemp, who knew Schmidt from his own time in San Francisco, and signed with the Chargers. Another signing was Bo Roberson, an Olympic long jumper fresh from taking silver in the 1960 games. A receiver later in his career, Roberson was used primarily as a running back in San Diego.

== Personnel ==
=== Staff ===
1961 San Diego Chargers staff
Front office: Owner – Barron Hilton; General manager – Sid Gillman; Scout - Don Klosterman; Head coaches: Head coach – Sid Gillman; Offensive coaches: End coach – Al Davis; Offensive line coach – Joe Madro	Defensive coaches: Defensive backfield coach – Jack Faulkner; Defensive line coach – Chuck Noll

=== Roster ===
1961 San Diego Chargers roster
Quarterbacks (QB): 15 Jack Kemp; 17 Hunter Enis; Running backs (RB): 22 Keith Lincoln; 23 Paul Lowe; 41 Charlie Flowers; Wide receivers (WR): 24 Luther Hayes; 26 Bo Roberson; 46 Bob Scarpitto; 88 Don Norton; Tight ends (TE): 83 Dave Kocourek; 89 Jacque MacKinnon	Offensive linemen (OL): 52 Don Rogers C; 60 Sam DeLuca G; 61 Ernie Barnes G/T; 68 Orlando Ferrante G; 70 Sherman Plunkett T; 74 Ron Mix T; 75 Ernie Wright T; 78 Gene Selawski T; Defensive linemen (DL): 76 Henry Schmidt DT/DE; 77 Ernie Ladd DT; 79 Bill Hudson DT; 80 Ron Nery DE; 86 Earl Faison DE	Linebackers (LB): 53 Bob Laraba OLB; 56 Emil Karas MLB/OLB; 81 Maury Schleicher LB; 84 Paul Maguire OLB/P; Defensive backs (DB): 25 Claude "Hoot" Gibson CB; 27 Charlie McNeil FS; 34 Bob Zeman SS; 36 Dick Harris CB; 47 Bud Whitehead CB; Special teams (ST): 39 George Blair K/S	Reserve: 50 Chuck Allen LB (IR); 57 George Belotti C (IR); 87 Howard Clark TE (IR); -- Dan Ficca G (Left squad); Rookies in italics

== Preseason ==
The Chargers' first exhibition game in San Diego drew a crowd of a little over 12,000, close to the reduced capacity of Balboa Stadium, which was in the process of begin renovated. They defeated the Oilers 27–14, in a rematch of the first AFL title game. Paul Lowe and flanker Dave Kocourek scored touchdowns of over 70 yards, and Roberson added a third. The teams met again twelve days later in Honolulu: San Diego jumped out to a 39–0 halftime lead, gave up four touchdowns in ten minutes, then clinched the win with their seventh rushing touchdown; Roberson scored three of them. Next, the Chargers returned home for a 35–7 victory over the Raiders. Lowe scored on a 72-yard punt return, rookie Lincoln took a short pass from Kemp 63 yards for another touchdown, and Faison got on the scoresheet with a safety. A week later, Lowe again ran a punt back 72 yards for a touchdown; Lowe, Kemp and Roberson added further touchdowns as San Diego led 28–0 at halftime, eventually winning 31–10 to complete an unbeaten preseason.

Week	Date	Opponent	Result	Record	Venue	Attendance
1	August 6	Houston Oilers	W 27–14	1–0	Balboa Stadium	12,304
2	August 18	vs. Houston Oilers	W 46–28	2–0	Honolulu Stadium	12,836
3	August 27	Oakland Raiders	W 35–7	3–0	Balboa Stadium	6,521
4	September 3	Dallas Texans	W 31–10	4–0	Balboa Stadium	15,232

== Regular season ==
=== Overview ===
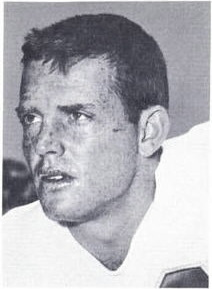
Dick Harris ran three of his seven interceptions back for touchdowns

San Diego proved a more welcoming city for the Chargers, with an average home attendance of 27,859 during the regular season, over 12,000 more than in Los Angeles. Hilton still reported a loss on the year, albeit a greatly reduced one of between $250,000 and $300,000.

On the field, the Chargers repeated as Western Division champions, this time with a 12–2 record, before losing to the Oilers in the title game for the second straight year. They retained many of their offensive stars from the 1960 season. Kemp again ranked second in the league for passing yardage (2,686), but his completion percentage fell below 50%, and he threw only 15 touchdowns against 22 interceptions. Only 4 of these interceptions came in the first seven games of the season, against 18 in the next seven; he threw another 4 in the AFL title game. While Lowe didn't quite match his impact of the previous season, he still ranked 4th in the league for rushing yards (767), and joint first for rushing touchdowns (nine). Kocourek became the club's first 1,000 yard receiver with 55 catches for 1,055 yards, while Don Norton added 47 catches and 816 yards.

On defense, the 1961 Chargers set a modern-era pro football record with 66 takeaways, the most in AFL or NFL history (the 1946 Cleveland Browns recorded one more during an AAFC season). The Chargers also recorded the most interceptions returned for a touchdown in both league histories with nine, and the most total interceptions with 49. All three of these record still stand as of 2022. Charlie McNeil led the team with nine interceptions, which stood as a club record until Antonio Cromartie broke it 46 years later (albeit in a 16-game regular season). Bob Zeman had eight interceptions and Dick Harris had seven, returning three for touchdowns (still a club record as of 2022). By contrast, only one Charger managed more than six interceptions in a season throughout the entire 1970s (Bryant Salter, 1972). Defensive end Ron Nery is unofficially (Note: The NFL did not keep sack statistics officially until 1982. Members of the Professional Football Researchers Association have largely reconstructed sack data from 1960 onwards based on official gamebooks, but the NFL does not acknowledge pre-1982 sack numbers.) credited with 8 quarterback sacks, again leading the team. Beyond Nery, the defensive line saw an overhaul, with rookies Faison, Bill Hudson and Ladd starting every game. Middle linebacker Allen and cornerback Claude Gibson, also new draftees, saw significant action. Another rookie, George Blair, doubled up as defensive back and kicker. His field-goal-conversion percentage was below 50% (he made 13 of 27), but still third best in the league, as was Paul Maguire's average of 41.5 yards per punt.

Linebacker Bob Laraba had five interceptions and scored three touchdowns, including one on offense. He died in a car accident shortly after the season ended, at the age of 28.

=== Schedule ===
Week	Date	Opponent	Result	Record	Venue	Attendance	Recap
1	September 10	at **Dallas Texans**	**W** 26–10	1–0	Cotton Bowl	24,500	Recap
2	September 17	**Oakland Raiders**	**W** 44–0	2–0	Balboa Stadium	20,216	Recap
3	September 24	Houston Oilers	**W** 34–24	3–0	Balboa Stadium	29,210	Recap
4	September 30	at Buffalo Bills	**W** 19–11	4–0	War Memorial Stadium	20,742	Recap
5	October 7	at Boston Patriots	**W** 38–27	5–0	Boston University Field	17,748	Recap
6	October 15	at New York Titans	**W** 25–10	6–0	Polo Grounds	25,136	Recap
7	October 22	at **Oakland Raiders**	**W** 41–10	7–0	Candlestick Park	12,014	Recap
8	October 29	**Denver Broncos**	**W** 37–0	8–0	Balboa Stadium	32,584	Recap
9	November 5	New York Titans	**W** 48–13	9–0	Balboa Stadium	33,391	Recap
10	November 12	at **Denver Broncos**	**W** 19–16	10–0	Bears Stadium	7,859	Recap
11	November 19	**Dallas Texans**	**W** 24–14	11–0	Balboa Stadium	33,788	Recap
12	Bye						
13	December 3	at Houston Oilers	**L** 13–33	11–1	Jeppesen Stadium	37,845	Recap
14	December 10	Buffalo Bills	**W** 28–10	12–1	Balboa Stadium	24,486	Recap
15	December 17	Boston Patriots	**L** 0–41	12–2	Balboa Stadium	21,339	Recap
Note: Intra-division opponents are in **bold** text.

=== Game summaries ===
==== Week 1: at Dallas Texans ====
Week One: San Diego Chargers at Dallas Texans – Game summary

Quarter	1	2	3	4	Total
Chargers	6	6	0	14	**26**
Texans	0	0	0	10	**10**

at Cotton Bowl, Dallas, Texas

- Date: September 10
- Game weather: 84 °F (28.9 °C), relative humidity 58%, wind 19 mph
- Game attendance: 24,500
- Box score

Game information

**First quarter**

- SDG – Paul Lowe 87-yard run (kick failed), 6:41. Chargers 6–0. **Drive: 1 play, 87 yards.**

**Second quarter**

- SDG – George Blair 18-yard field goal, 13:32. Chargers 9–0. **Drive: 9 plays, 51 yards.**
- SDG – George Blair 17-yard field goal, 4:52. Chargers 12–0. **Drive: 10 plays, 70 yards.**

**Third quarter**

- No scoring plays.

**Fourth quarter**

- DAL – Jack Spikes 27-yard field goal, 14:14. Chargers 12–3. **Drive: 12 plays, 54 yards.**
- SDG – Bob Laraba 1-yard run (George Blair kick), 6:30. Chargers 19–3. **Drive: 6 plays, 14 yards.**
- SDG – Bo Roberson 59-yard run (George Blair kick), 1:58. Chargers 26–3. **Drive: 6 plays, 53 yards.**
- DAL – Jack Spikes 74-yard run (Jack Spikes kick), 1:12. Chargers 26–10. **Drive: 1 play, 74 yards.**

**Top passers**

- SDG – Jack Kemp – 15/32, 162 yards
- DAL – Cotton Davidson – 7/16, 78 yards, 3 INT

**Top rushers**

- SDG – Paul Lowe – 13 rushes, 100 yards, TD
- DAL – Jack Spikes – 7 rushes, 109 yards, TD

**Top receivers**

- SDG – Dave Kocourek – 6 receptions, 67 yards
- DAL – Max Boydston – 3 receptions, 35 yards

In their first game of the season, San Diego capitalized on six takeaways and a pair of long runs to defeat their closest divisional rivals from the previous season. Following an exchange of punts, Lowe benefited from a key Ron Mix block as he broke away for an 87-yard touchdown. It set a club record for longest run that has since been tied, but not surpassed as of 2022. Blair missed the extra point, but kicked a pair of field goals in the first half, while Allen, Faison and McNeil each intercepted Dallas quarterback Cotton Davidson.

The Texans scored for the first time with a field goal early in the 4th quarter; they then recovered a Kemp fumble in Charger territory, but Gibson ended the threat with an interception. On the next Texans possession, Emil Karas recovered a fumble at the Dallas 14-yard line. Laraba then came in as quarterback, a role he played occasionally during his career; Laraba ran the ball himself on four of the next six plays, and scored from the 1-yard line. Roberson broke away for a 53-yard touchdown run late in the game, and the lone Dallas touchdown came too late to make a difference.

Lowe had no further breakaways after his touchdown run, but still finished with 100 yards from 13 carries.

==== Week 2: vs. Oakland Raiders ====
Week Two: Oakland Raiders at San Diego Chargers – Game summary

Quarter	1	2	3	4	Total
Raiders	0	0	0	0	**0**
Chargers	14	16	0	14	**44**

at Balboa Stadium, San Diego, California

- Date: September 17
- Game weather: 68 °F (20.0 °C), relative humidity 68%, wind 8 mph
- Game attendance: 20,216
- Box score

Game information

**First quarter**

- SDG – Dick Harris 41-yard interception return (George Blair kick), 14:14. Chargers 7–0.
- SDG – Paul Lowe 2-yard run (George Blair kick), 0:31. Chargers 14–0. **Drive: 14 plays, 80 yards.**

**Second quarter**

- SDG – Bo Roberson 34-yard run (George Blair kick), 11:00. Chargers 21–0. **Drive: 5 plays, 57 yards.**
- SDG – Charlie Flowers 2-yard run (kick failed), 6:19. Chargers 27–0. **Drive: 8 plays, 35 yards.**
- SDG – George Blair 34-yard field goal, 1:08. Chargers 30–0. **Drive: 11 plays, 44 yards.**

**Third quarter**

- No scoring plays.

**Fourth quarter**

- SDG – Charlie Flowers 1-yard run (George Blair kick), 5:37. Chargers 37–0. **Drive: 6 plays, 22 yards.**
- SDG – Bo Roberson 17-yard run (George Blair kick), 2:00. Chargers 44–0. **Drive: 3 plays, 31 yards.**

**Top passers**

- OAK – Tom Flores – 14/23, 94 yards, 3 INT
- SDG – Jack Kemp – 11/20, 130 yards

**Top rushers**

- OAK – Charley Fuller – 13 rushes, 65 yards
- SDG – Bo Roberson – 7 rushes, 90 yards, 2 TD

**Top receivers**

- OAK – Doug Asad – 3 receptions, 27 yards
- SDG – Howard Clark – 2 receptions, 54 yards

The Chargers' first game in their new city proved a success, as they dominated their Californian rivals throughout. Oakland had lost their opener 55–0, and fared only slightly better here; on the third play of the game, Harris intercepted a Tom Flores pass and returned it 41 yards for a touchdown. The Raiders' best chance to score came on their next drive, when they reached the Charger 26 but missed a field goal. On the ensuing drive, San Diego drove 80 yards the other way, and Lowe swept around the left end for a 2-yard score.

Roberson and Charlie Flowers rushed for two touchdowns each, giving San Diego a total of five for the game, a franchise record since tied multiple times (including the next game against the Raiders) but not surpassed as of 2022. Five different players had interceptions, and the Chargers forced six turnovers to none, while outgaining the Raiders in total offensive yards, 386–106. Oakland crossed midfield only twice in 12 total possessions.

==== Week 3: vs. Houston Oilers ====
Week Three: Houston Oilers at San Diego Chargers – Game summary

Quarter	1	2	3	4	Total
Oilers	3	0	7	14	**24**
Chargers	3	28	3	0	**34**

at Balboa Stadium, San Diego, California

- Date: September 24
- Game weather: 67 °F (19.4 °C), relative humidity 70%, wind 9 mph
- Game attendance: 29,210
- Box score

Game information

**First quarter**

- SDG – George Blair 44-yard field goal, 5:58. Chargers 3–0. **Drive: 4 plays, -1 yards.**
- HOU – George Blanda 28-yard field goal, 3:00. Tied 3–3. **Drive: 6 plays, 17 yards.**

**Second quarter**

- SDG – Dave Kocourek 7-yard pass from Jack Kemp (George Blair kick), 10:08. Chargers 10–3. **Drive: 5 plays, 17 yards.**
- SDG – Paul Lowe 2-yard run (George Blair kick), 7:24. Chargers 17–3. **Drive: 3 plays, 31 yards.**
- SDG – Charlie McNeil 76-yard interception return (George Blair kick), 4:24. Chargers 24–3.
- SDG – Luther Hayes 37-yard pass from Jack Kemp (George Blair kick), 1:00. Chargers 31–3.

**Third quarter**

- HOU – Ken Hall 13-yard pass from Jacky Lee (George Blanda kick), 8:43. Chargers 31–10. **Drive: 9 plays, 72 yards.**
- SDG – George Blair 14-yard field goal, 3:26. Chargers 34–10. **Drive: 4 plays, 2 yards.**

**Fourth quarter**

- HOU – John White 40-yard pass from Jacky Lee (George Blanda kick), 8:16. Chargers 34–17. **Drive: 4 plays, 50 yards.**
- HOU – Charley Tolar 3-yard pass from Jacky Lee (George Blanda kick), 0:47. Chargers 34–24. **Drive: 4 plays, 60 yards.**

**Top passers**

- HOU – Jacky Lee – 10/25, 190 yards, 3 TD, 2 INT
- SDG – Jack Kemp – 6/17, 101 yards, 2 TD

**Top rushers**

- HOU – Charley Tolar – 13 rushes, 32 yards
- SDG – Paul Lowe – 17 rushes, 23 yards, TD

**Top receivers**

- HOU – John White – 6 receptions, 112 yards, TD
- SDG – Luther Hayes – 1 reception, 37 yards, TD

McNeil had a record-breaking performance as the Chargers won a rematch of the 1960 AFL Championship Game. Houston were threatening to break a 3–3 tie in the 2nd quarter when McNeil intercepted a George Blanda pass at his own 7-yard line, and returned it for 76 yards up the right sideline. Kemp then converted a 4th and inches with a quarterback sneak, before hitting Kocourek for a 7-yard touchdown. Blanda's next pass was intercepted at the line of scrimmage by Faison, and Lowe scored within three plays to double the lead. Next, McNeil took a third interception all the way back for a 76-yard touchdown, before Blanda was picked off for the fourth time, by McNeil, and Luther Hayes had a 37-yard scoring catch to make it 31–3 at the break.

Houston tried backup QB Jacky Lee after halftime. He managed three touchdowns, but also threw two further interceptions and lost a fumble; the Chargers had little difficulty in keeping Houston at bay. One of the interceptions was by McNeil, who finished the game with 177 interception return yards, still an AFL/NFL record as of 2023. San Diego had intercepted 15 passes from 6 different quarterbacks in the first three weeks. This continuing defensive success covered up an indifferent offensive display, which saw the Chargers gain 158 yards and earn just seven first downs.

==== Week 4: at Buffalo Bills ====
Week Four: San Diego Chargers at Buffalo Bills – Game summary

Quarter	1	2	3	4	Total
Chargers	13	0	6	0	**19**
Bills	0	11	0	0	**11**

at War Memorial Stadium, Buffalo, New York

- Date: September 30
- Game weather: 57 °F (13.9 °C), relative humidity 64%, wind 11 mph
- Game attendance: 20,742
- Box score

Game information

**First quarter**

- SDG – Dick Harris 56-yard interception return (George Blair kick), 13:23. Chargers 7–0.
- SDG – Paul Lowe 3-yard run (kick failed), 2:05. Chargers 13–0. **Drive: 8 plays, 78 yards.**

**Second quarter**

- BUF – Joe Hergert 16-yard field goal, 12:48. Chargers 13–3. **Drive: 12 plays, 55 yards.**
- BUF – Elbert Dubenion 29-yard pass from M. C. Reynolds (Richie Lucas run), 0:28. Chargers 13–11. **Drive: 1 play, 29 yards.**

**Third quarter**

- SDG – George Blair 38-yard field goal, 11:00. Chargers 16–11. **Drive: 8 plays, 49 yards.**
- SDG – George Blair 11-yard field goal, 0:19. Chargers 19–11. **Drive: 15 plays, 67 yards.**

**Fourth quarter**

- No scoring plays.

**Top passers**

- SDG – Jack Kemp – 14/26, 146 yards, INT
- BUF – M. C. Reynolds – 15/28, 177 yards, TD, INT

**Top rushers**

- SDG – Paul Lowe – 22 rushes, 128 yards, TD
- BUF – M. C. Reynolds – 8 rushes, 65 yards

**Top receivers**

- SDG – Luther Hayes – 4 receptions, 49 yards
- BUF – Tom Rychlec – 5 receptions, 57 yards

In contrast to the recent glut of takeaways, the Chargers only had two in this game, but both were significant. Only three plays into the game, Harris had his second interception-return touchdown of the season, this one covering 56 yards and putting the Chargers ahead to stay. Later in the opening quarter, Kemp was sacked to bring up a 3rd and 14, but responded with a 16-yard scramble to keep the drive going. Lowe broke off a 30-yard touchdown run three plays later, making it 13–0. Buffalo responded with field-goal attempts on their next three drives, though only the first was successful. Shortly before halftime Kemp threw an interception on 1st and 10; the Bills scored a play later and added a two-point conversion, making it 13–11 heading into halftime.

San Diego controlled the clock in the third quarter, running 23 plays to the Bills' 3, and scoring through Blair field goals on both their drives. After Buffalo missed a field goal, the Bills' offense had one more chance, starting at their own 8-yard line. They picked up three first downs, and reached a 3rd and 11 near midfield, before Faison recovered a fumble to end the threat. Lowe then picked up a first down, and San Diego ran out the clock. Lowe carried 22 times on the day, for 128 yards and a touchdown.

==== Week 5: at Boston Patriots ====
Week Five: San Diego Chargers at New England Patriots – Game summary

Quarter	1	2	3	4	Total
Chargers	7	24	0	7	**38**
Patriots	0	14	7	6	**27**

at Boston University Field, Boston, Massachusetts

- Date: October 7
- Game weather: 63 °F (17.2 °C), relative humidity 74%, wind 9 mph
- Game attendance: 17,748
- Box score

Game information

**First quarter**

- SDG – Luther Hayes 12-yard pass from Jack Kemp (George Blair kick), 7:10. Chargers 7–0. **Drive: 14 plays, 80 yards.**

**Second quarter**

- BOS – Billy Lott 1-yard run (Gino Cappelletti kick), 14:48. Tied 7–7. **Drive: 8 plays, 75 yards.**
- SDG – Bob Zeman 35-yard blocked punt return (George Blair kick), 12:00. Chargers 14–7.
- SDG – George Blair 10-yard field goal, 4:25. Chargers 17–7. **Drive: 6 plays, 51 yards.**
- BOS – Thomas Stephens 17-yard fumble return (Gino Cappelletti kick), 3:15. Chargers 17–14.
- SDG – Dave Kocourek 75-yard pass from Jack Kemp (George Blair kick), 2:30. Chargers 24–14. **Drive: 1 play, 75 yards.**
- SDG – Don Norton 30-yard pass from Jack Kemp (George Blair kick), 1:20. Chargers 31–14. **Drive: 4 plays, 44 yards.**

**Third quarter**

- BOS – Jim Colclough 30-yard pass from Babe Parilli (Gino Cappelletti kick), 9:17. Chargers 31–21. **Drive: 10 plays, 66 yards.**

**Fourth quarter**

- SDG – Jack Kemp 3-yard run (George Blair kick), 6:14. Chargers 38–21. **Drive: 7 plays, 79 yards.**
- BOS – Gino Cappelletti 47-yard pass from Babe Parilli (kick failed), 0:48. Chargers 38–27. **Drive: 10 plays, 83 yards.**

**Top passers**

- SDG – Jack Kemp – 12/24, 315 yards, 3 TD, 2 INT
- BOS – Babe Parilli – 10/15, 128 yards, 2 TD, INT

**Top rushers**

- SDG – Paul Lowe – 12 rushes, 31 yards
- BOS – Billy Lott – 6 rushes, 61 yards, TD

**Top receivers**

- SDG – Dave Kocourek – 3 receptions, 160 yards, TD
- BOS – Gino Cappelletti – 5 receptions, 86 yards, TD

Kemp threw for three touchdowns and ran for another as the Chargers kept their unbeaten start going. He led the Chargers on a 14-play, 80-yard touchdown drive on the game's opening drive, converting two third downs with passes and one with a scramble. Hayes finished the drive with a 12-yard scoring catch. Boston tied the score, and were soon looking to pin San Diego deep in their own territory, punting from the Charger 45. The kick was blocked, picked up by Zeman, and run back 35 yards for the touchdown that put San Diego ahead to stay.

A 35-yard catch by Norton set up a Blair field goal in the final five minutes of the 2nd quarter, before the Patriots scored a special-teams touchdown of their own, running the ball back to the end zone when Lowe fumbled a punt return. Kemp responded immediately with a 75-yard touchdown pass to Kocourek on the next play from scrimmage. On the following play, Harris claimed an interception; on the play after that, Kemp appeared to have thrown another touchdown, to Norton. The score was nullified by an illegal-motion penalty, but the same pair combined for a 30-yard touchdown only three plays later, and it was 31–14 at the break. After Boston scored a touchdown in the 3rd quarter, Kemp put the game away in the 4th, finding Kocourek for a 65-yard catch and run, before rolling right and scoring himself on a 3rd and goal from the 4.

Kemp completed 12 passes from 24 attempts, for 315 yards, three touchdowns and two interceptions, with Kocourek gaining 160 yards and a touchdown from just 3 receptions. Zeman had an interception to go with his special-teams touchdown.

==== Week 6: at New York Titans ====
Week Six: San Diego Chargers at New York Titans – Game summary

Quarter	1	2	3	4	Total
Chargers	7	10	0	8	**25**
Titans	0	7	3	0	**10**

at Polo Grounds, New York, New York

- Date: October 15
- Game weather: 47 °F (8.3 °C), relative humidity 68%, wind 27 mph
- Game attendance: 25,136
- Box score

Game information

**First quarter**

- SDG – Jack Kemp 1-yard run (George Blair kick), 7:42. Chargers 7–0. **Drive: 8 plays, 68 yards.**

**Second quarter**

- NYT – Bill Mathis 4-yard pass from Al Dorow (Bill Shockley kick), 2:35. Tied 7–7. **Drive: 11 plays, 76 yards.**
- SDG – George Blair 20-yard field goal, 8:16. Chargers 10–7. **Drive: 9 plays, 65 yards.**
- SDG – Jack Kemp 1-yard run (George Blair kick), 1:38. Chargers 17–7. **Drive: 6 plays, 78 yards.**

**Third quarter**

- NYT – Bill Shockley 31-yard field goal, 0:27. Chargers 17–10. **Drive: 4 plays, -4 yards.**

**Fourth quarter**

- SDG – Paul Lowe 25-yard run (Claude Gibson run), 6:28. Chargers 25–10. **Drive: 4 plays, 66 yards.**

**Top passers**

- SDG – Jack Kemp – 15/38, 302 yards, INT
- NYT – Al Dorow – 18/40, 186 yards, TD, 4 INT

**Top rushers**

- SDG – Paul Lowe – 14 rushes, 58 yards, TD
- NYT – Bill Mathis – 10 rushes, 47 yards

**Top receivers**

- SDG – Don Norton – 5 receptions, 121 yards
- NYT – Art Powell – 8 receptions, 88 yards

In a game where both teams committed five turnovers, San Diego used big passing plays to win. Zeman made the first of four interceptions of Al Dorow in the first quarter, and Kemp completed passes of 31 and 32 yards to running backs Flowers and Lowe, before sneaking in from a yard out for a 7–0 lead. Later, Lowe fumbled in Titan territory, and Dorow capitalized by leading a 76-yard touchdown drive in which he completed six passes, the final one for a touchdown. Completions of 26 and 28 yards by Kemp set up Blair for a 20-yard field goal to restore the lead. Later in the 2nd quarter, Harris intercepted a long throw by Dorow and returned the ball to the Charger 22. On the ensuing drive, Kemp found Norton for 52 yards up the left sideline, before again sneaking in for a one-yard touchdown.

The Titans turned a Kemp interception into a field goal late in the third quarter, and trailed by only seven points as the teams exchanged punts on the next four possessions. San Diego then put the game away with back-to-back big plays: Kemp found Norton along the left sideline again, this time for 33 yards, and Lowe followed his blockers around right end for 25 yards and a touchdown. Gibson then ran in a two-point conversion, the first ever scored by the Chargers.

Kemp became the first AFL passer to post two consecutive 300-yard games; he was 15 of 38 for 302 yards, no touchdowns and an interception. Norton had 5 receptions for 121 yards.

==== Week 7: at Oakland Raiders ====
Week Seven: San Diego Chargers at Oakland Raiders – Game summary

Quarter	1	2	3	4	Total
Chargers	20	14	7	0	**41**
Raiders	7	0	3	0	**10**

at Candlestick Park, San Francisco, California

- Date: October 22
- Game weather: 54 °F (12.2 °C), relative humidity 65%, wind 10 mph
- Game attendance: 12,014
- Box score

Game information

**First quarter**

- OAK – Bob Coolbaugh 28-yard pass from Tom Flores (George Fleming kick), 11:10. Raiders 7–0. **Drive: 4 plays, 39 yards.**
- SDG – Paul Lowe 35-yard run (kick failed), 7:57. Raiders 7–6. **Drive: 9 plays, 74 yards.**
- SDG – Paul Lowe 46-yard run (George Blair kick), 5:36. Chargers 13–7. **Drive: 1 play, 46 yards.**
- SDG – Don Norton 15-yard pass from Jack Kemp (George Blair kick), 2:18. Chargers 20–7. **Drive: 4 plays, 23 yards.**

**Second quarter**

- SDG – Charlie Flowers 1-yard run (George Blair kick), 5:00. Chargers 27–7. **Drive: 3 plays, 10 yards.**
- SDG – Jack Kemp 1-yard run (George Blair kick), 1:00. Chargers 34–7. **Drive: 8 plays, 45 yards.**

**Third quarter**

- OAK – George Fleming 22-yard field goal, 10:30. Chargers 34–10. **Drive: 5 plays, 8 yards.**
- SDG – Hunter Enis 2-yard run (George Blair kick), 0:27. Chargers 41–10. **Drive: 19 plays, 86 yards.**

**Fourth quarter**

- No scoring plays.

**Top passers**

- SDG – Jack Kemp – 5/17, 65 yards, TD
- OAK – Tom Flores – 9/20, 96 yards, TD, 3 INT

**Top rushers**

- SDG – Paul Lowe – 11 rushes, 106 yards, 2 TD
- OAK – George Fleming – 3 rushes, 15 yards

**Top receivers**

- SDG – Don Norton – 2 receptions, 40 yards, TD
- OAK – Doug Asad – 3 receptions, 44 yards

San Diego overcame an early deficit to thrash the Raiders a second time. Lowe fumbled an early punt, and Flores capitalised with a touchdown pass four plays later. Oakland then appeared to have forced a punt, but were penalised for roughing the kicker, giving the Chargers a fresh set of downs. Three plays later, Lowe shook off two would-be tacklers on a 35-yard touchdown run. After the Raiders went three-and-out, Lowe immediately scored again, leaving the defense behind with a burst of speed for a 46-yard touchdown. Raider turnovers led to further touchdowns for Norton, Flowers and Kemp, creating a 34–7 halftime lead. Backup quarterback Hunter Enis came on in the second half and led a 19-play, 86-yard drive in which the Chargers converted five 3rd downs and one 4th down, Ennis himself running in the game's final touchdown.

As they had in the first game against the Raiders, San Diego rushed for five touchdowns. Lowe carried 11 times for 106 yards and two scores. Kemp completed only five passes out of 17, and Enis 5 out of 16. The Charger defense turned in a dominant performance, with six takeaways, including four interceptions; Gibson had two of them. San Diego allowed only 58 yards of total offense and 2 rushing yards, both still club records as of 2022. After four regular season games against Oakland in two seasons, the Chargers had won each time, by a combined 178–55.

==== Week 8: vs. Denver Broncos ====
Week Eight: Denver Broncos at San Diego Chargers – Game summary

Quarter	1	2	3	4	Total
Broncos	0	0	0	0	**0**
Chargers	3	14	10	10	**37**

at Balboa Stadium, San Diego, California

- Date: October 29
- Game weather: 61 °F (16.1 °C), relative humidity 57%, wind 9 mph
- Game attendance: 32,584
- Box score

Game information

**First quarter**

- SDG – George Blair 16-yard field goal, 7:21. Chargers 3–0. **Drive: 14 plays, 59 yards.**

**Second quarter**

- SDG – Bob Laraba 57-yard interception return (George Blair kick), 10:10. Chargers 10–0.
- SDG – Chuck Allen 58-yard interception return (George Blair kick), 8:06. Chargers 17–0.

**Third quarter**

- SDG – George Blair 13-yard field goal, 9:11. Chargers 20–0. **Drive: 7 plays, 32 yards.**
- SDG – Don Norton 33-yard pass from Jack Kemp (George Blair kick), 6:04. Chargers 27–0. **Drive: 1 play, 28 yards.**

**Fourth quarter**

- SDG – George Blair 42-yard field goal, 11:35. Chargers 30–0. **Drive: 4 plays, -13 yards.**
- SDG – Keith Lincoln 34-yard pass from Hunter Enis (George Blair kick), 3:48. Chargers 37–0. **Drive: 1 play, 34 yards.**

**Top passers**

- DEN – George Herring – 6/15, 124 yards, 3 INT
- SDG – Jack Kemp – 11/28, 162 yards, TD, 4 INT

**Top rushers**

- DEN – Donnie Stone – 12 rushes, 42 yards
- SDG – Bo Roberson – 5 rushes, 38 yards

**Top receivers**

- DEN – Donnie Stone – 7 receptions, 74 yards
- SDG – Don Norton – 5 receptions, 103 yards, TD

Seven takeaways by the Charger defense were more than enough to overcome five turnovers from the offense, as San Diego shut out the Broncos. Denver was not short of scoring opportunities, especially in the first half, when six of its seven possessions featured snaps in Charger territory. These drives ended in two missed field goals, two turnovers on downs and, most damagingly, two interceptions that were run back for touchdowns on consecutive drives, with Laraba and Allen returning their interceptions 57 and 58 yards, respectively. Kemp had a rough day with four interceptions, but did manage a 33-yard touchdown to Norton in the 3rd quarter as San Diego pulled away. Enis entered the game in the final quarter and threw a 34-yard pass to Lincoln, for Lincoln's first touchdown as a professional.

Allen added a pair of fumble recoveries to his interception-return touchdown. Norton caught 5 passes for 103 yards and a touchdown. Paid attendance crossed 30,000 for the first time in a Chargers home game.

==== Week 9: vs. New York Titans ====
Week Nine: New York Titans at San Diego Chargers – Game summary

Quarter	1	2	3	4	Total
Titans	7	6	0	0	**13**
Chargers	0	7	28	13	**48**

at Balboa Stadium, San Diego, California

- Date: November 5
- Game weather: 63 °F (17.2 °C), relative humidity 67%, wind 9 mph
- Game attendance: 33,391
- Box score

Game information

**First quarter**

- NYT – Bill Mathis 5-yard run (Dick Guesman kick), 3:10. Titans 7–0. **Drive: 16 plays, 80 yards.**

**Second quarter**

- NYT – Al Dorow 1-yard run (kick failed), 4:14. Titans 13–0. **Drive: 13 plays, 83 yards.**
- SDG – Jack Kemp 1-yard run (George Blair kick), 0:56. Titans 13–7. **Drive: 9 plays, 75 yards.**

**Third quarter**

- SDG – Jack Kemp 1-yard run (George Blair kick), 10:35. Chargers 14–13. **Drive: 5 plays, 24 yards.**
- SDG – Paul Lowe 61-yard run (George Blair kick), 9:09. Chargers 21–13. **Drive: 1 play, 67 yards.**
- SDG – Don Norton 13-yard pass from Jack Kemp (George Blair kick), 2:21. Chargers 28–13. **Drive: 8 plays, 60 yards.**
- SDG – Charlie McNeil 41-yard interception return (George Blair kick), 0:32. Chargers 35–13.

**Fourth quarter**

- SDG – Hunter Enis 1-yard run (kick blocked), 7:21. Chargers 41–13. **Drive: 6 plays, 16 yards.**
- SDG – Luther Hayes 17-yard pass from Hunter Enis (George Blair kick), 1:54. Chargers 48–13. **Drive: 4 plays, 44 yards.**

**Top passers**

- NYT – Al Dorow – 12/24, 127 yards, 3 INT
- SDG – Jack Kemp – 8/18, 127 yards, TD, 2 INT

**Top rushers**

- NYT – Bill Mathis – 16 rushes, 39 yards, TD
- SDG – Paul Lowe – 9 rushes, 110 yards, TD

**Top receivers**

- NYT – Art Powell – 5 receptions, 80 yards
- SDG – Don Norton – 4 receptions, 71 yards

Amidst the now-familiar glut of turnovers, San Diego won another blowout, though they had to overcome a bad start to do it. Kemp threw interceptions on consecutive attempts in the first half, while New York had two long touchdown drives, converting a 4th down in each. Down 13–0, the Chargers responded with a 9-play, 75-yard touchdown drive, a Kemp keeper getting them back in the game 56 seconds before halftime.

It was the first of seven unanswered touchdowns for San Diego. Gibson's 40-yard punt return set up another one-yard Kemp run, then Zemen's interception was followed immediately by Lowe's 67-yard breakaway for another score. Norton added a 13-yard touchdown on the next Charger drive, before McNeil completed a 28-point 3rd quarter with an interception of Dorow and 41-yard touchdown return. With New York continuing to give the ball away in the 4th quarter, Enis came in and rushed for one score before finding Hayes for another.

Lowe had 9 carries for 110 yards and a touchdown. Allen continued his good form, snagging two of the Chargers' five picks, but broke his ankle while returning the second of these and missed the rest of the season. With their nearest rivals, the Dallas Texans, standing at 3–5, San Diego needed only one win from their five remaining games to repeat as division champions.

==== Week 10: at Denver Broncos ====
Week Ten: San Diego Chargers at Denver Broncos – Game summary

Quarter	1	2	3	4	Total
Chargers	0	0	12	7	**19**
Broncos	7	2	0	7	**16**

at Bears Stadium, Denver, Colorado

- Date: November 12
- Game weather: 36 °F (2.2 °C), relative humidity 75%, wind 10 mph, wind chill 29
- Game attendance: 7,859
- Box score

Game information

**First quarter**

- DEN – Fred Bukaty 1-yard run (Jack Hill kick), 4:27. Broncos 7–0. **Drive: 9 plays, 70 yards.**

**Second quarter**

- DEN – Safety, ball snapped through end zone. Broncos 9–0.

**Third quarter**

- SDG – Keith Lincoln 91-yard pass from Jack Kemp (kick aborted), 9:32. Broncos 9–6. **Drive: 3 plays, 86 yards.**
- SDG – Dick Harris 30-yard interception return (kick failed), 8:39. Chargers 12–9.

**Fourth quarter**

- DEN – Al Frazier 87-yard pass from Frank Tripucka (Jack Hill kick). Broncos 16–12. **Drive: 3 plays, 88 yards.**
- SDG – Bob Scarpitto 16-yard pass from Jack Kemp (Bob Laraba kick), 7:17. Chargers 19–16. **Drive: 8 plays, 64 yards.**

**Top passers**

- SDG – Jack Kemp – 11/31, 201 yards, 2 TD, 3 INT
- DEN – Frank Tripucka – 6/15, 124 yards, TD, 5 INT

**Top rushers**

- SDG – Keith Lincoln – 4 rushes, 36 yards
- DEN – Dave Ames – 10 rushes, 62 yards

**Top receivers**

- SDG – Keith Lincoln – 3 receptions, 97 yards, TD
- DEN – Al Frazier – 5 receptions, 125 yards, TD

The Chargers clinched the AFL West by edging the Broncos in a Denver snowstorm. The Broncos outgained San Diego by 157 yards to 32 in the first half, scoring on 4th and goal from inside the one, and getting a further two points when a long snap went over punter Maguire's head for a safety. Kemp threw an end-zone interception to end the Chargers' best chance before the break.

Two big plays turned the game in the 3rd quarter. On 3rd and 15 from the Chargers' 9, Lincoln took a Kemp pass 91 yards to set a new team record for longest touchdown from scrimmage; this record would stand for 33 years. Bronco's QB Frank Tripucka threw his third interception three plays later. Harris was the beneficiary, returning the ball 30 yards for his third such touchdown of the season. Following these touchdowns, one extra-point attempt was foiled by a bad snap, and the other was missed by Laraba, leaving the score at 12–9. Tripucka managed a long touchdown pass of his own early in the 4th quarter, an 87-yarder to restore Denver's lead. Kemp dropped back to pass on every play of the Chargers' response, getting sacked once but completing 5 of 7 for 74 yards and a touchdown to Bob Scarpitto.

A Zeman interception stopped the next Denver drive; the Broncos were then pinned on their own 1, and forced to punt from there after three incompletions. A 20-yard punt return by Gibson set the Chargers up at the Denver 15, but Kocourek's touchdown catch was ruled out by penalty before Kemp threw an interception on 4th down. Starting at their own five with 2:04 on the clock and two timeouts, the Broncos made slow progress, converting a 4th down to stay alive but only getting as far as their 47-yard line, from where Tripucka threw an incomplete pass as time expired.

Denver finished with a 358–209 yardage advantage. They had two 100-yard receivers (Al Frazier and Lionel Taylor) but Tripucka was intercepted by five different Chargers. Lincoln rushed 4 times for 36 yards, and caught 3 passes for 97 yards and a touchdown.

==== Week 11: vs. Dallas Texans ====
Week Eleven: Dallas Texans at San Diego Chargers – Game summary

Quarter	1	2	3	4	Total
Texans	0	0	7	7	**14**
Chargers	0	17	0	7	**24**

at Balboa Stadium, San Diego, California

- Date: November 19
- Game weather: 63 °F (17.2 °C), relative humidity 67%, wind 9 mph
- Game attendance: 33,788
- Box score

Game information

**First quarter**

- No scoring plays.

**Second quarter**

- SDG – George Blair 10-yard field goal, 14:53. Chargers 3–0. **Drive: 9 plays, 51 yards.**
- SDG – Dave Kocourek 61-yard pass from Jack Kemp (George Blair kick), 11:26. Chargers 10–0. **Drive: 2 plays, 61 yards.**
- SDG – Bob Laraba 61-yard interception return (George Blair kick), 4:41. Chargers 17–0.

**Third quarter**

- DAL – Cotton Davidson 1-yard run (Cotton Davidson kick), 11:06. Chargers 17–7. **Drive: 7 plays, 72 yards.**

**Fourth quarter**

- SDG – Bob Scarpitto 53-yard pass from Jack Kemp (George Blair kick), 12:06. Chargers 24–7. **Drive: 3 plays, 66 yards.**
- DAL – Johnny Robinson 34-yard pass from Cotton Davidson (Cotton Davidson kick), 1:54. Chargers 24–14. **Drive: 12 plays, 78 yards.**

**Top passers**

- DAL – Cotton Davidson – 14/33, 165 yards, TD, 3 INT
- SDG – Jack Kemp – 15/27, 357 yards, 2 TD, INT

**Top rushers**

- DAL – Abner Haynes – 12 rushes, 76 yards
- SDG – Keith Lincoln – 6 rushes, 24 yards

**Top receivers**

- DAL – Johnny Robinson – 3 receptions, 53 yards, TD
- SDG – Dave Kocourek – 7 receptions, 169 yards, TD

Kemp completed several long passes as the Chargers won their 15th consecutive regular-season game, still a club record as of 2022. After Blair missed from 39 yards on the game's opening possession, Norton's 34-yard catch set up another chance, which Blair converted. The Texans went three-and-out, and on the next play Kocourek took a screen pass 61 yards for a touchdown, benefitting from Sherman Plunkett's key downfield block. Later in the quarter, Laraba picked off a Davidson pass and returned it 61 yards for a touchdown and 17–0 lead. It was San Diego's fourth consecutive game with at least one interception-return touchdown.

Davidson scored on a keeper on the first drive of the second half. Kemp found Norton for 42 yards in response, but fumbled on the next play, and Dallas recovered. The Chargers had turnovers on their next two drives as well, but the defense kept Dallas from converting the errors into points. A Zeman interception early in the 4th quarter was followed three plays later by Scarpitto's 53-yard touchdown catch, and the Chargers weren't troubled again.

Kemp was 15 of 27 for 357 yards, two touchdowns and an interception. Kocourek caught 7 passes for 169 yards and a touchdown, while Norton had 6 catches for 120 yards. The crowd was the largest in San Diego sports history up to that point.

==== Week 13: at Houston Oilers ====
Week Thirteen: San Diego Chargers at Houston Oilers – Game summary

Quarter	1	2	3	4	Total
Chargers	7	0	0	6	**13**
Oilers	13	6	14	0	**33**

at Jeppesen Stadium, Houston, Texas

- Date: December 3
- Game weather: 62 °F (16.7 °C), relative humidity 83%, wind 9 mph
- Game attendance: 37,845
- Box score

Game information

**First quarter**

- SDG – Don Norton 10-yard pass from Jack Kemp (George Blair kick), 7:45. Chargers 7–0. **Drive: 2 plays, 12 yards.**
- HOU – Bob McLeod 17-yard pass from George Blanda (kick failed), 5:22. Chargers 7–6. **Drive: 6 plays, 80 yards.**
- HOU – Charley Hennigan 31-yard pass from George Blanda (George Blanda kick), 0:00. Oilers 13–7. **Drive: 8 plays, 77 yards.**

**Second quarter**

- HOU – George Blanda 55-yard field goal, 9:49. Oilers 16–7. **Drive: 4 plays, 0 yards.**
- HOU – George Blanda 23-yard field goal, 2:11. Oilers 19–7. **Drive: 8 plays, 26 yards.**

**Third quarter**

- HOU – Charley Hennigan 14-yard pass from George Blanda (George Blanda kick), 4:35. Oilers 26–7. **Drive: 3 plays, 42 yards.**
- HOU – Charley Hennigan 32-yard pass from George Blanda (George Blanda kick), 2:34. Oilers 33–7. **Drive: 1 play, 32 yards.**

**Fourth quarter**

- SDG – Don Norton 4-yard pass from Jack Kemp (run failed), 10:58. Oilers 33–13. **Drive: 14 plays, 80 yards.**

**Top passers**

- SDG – Jack Kemp – 22/39, 242 yards, 2 TD, 2 INT
- HOU – George Blanda – 20/33, 351 yards, 4 TD, INT

**Top rushers**

- SDG – Paul Lowe – 9 rushes, 20 yards
- HOU – Charley Tolar – 12 rushes, 56 yards

**Top receivers**

- SDG – Don Norton – 6 receptions, 110 yards, 2 TD
- HOU – Charley Hennigan – 10 receptions, 214 yards, 3 TD

San Diego came out of their bye week looking to complete an unbeaten season, but the Oilers were on a winning streak of their own (six in a row), and needed the win to stay a game clear in the AFL East; led by four Blanda touchdowns, Houston won easily.

Hudson got San Diego off to a good start; he recovered a fumble at the Oiler 12, and Norton scored two plays later. The Charger offense sputtered from there, only crossing midfield twice in their next ten possessions, while Blanda took charge. The Oilers' kicker/quarterback threw two touchdowns in the 1st quarter and two more in the 3rd. In between, he made a pair of field goals, including a 55-yarder; this would stand as the longest in the 10-season run of the AFL. By the time Kemp and Norton combined for another score, the game was long since out of reach.

Norton caught 6 passes for 110 yards and two touchdowns, but was overshadowed by Oiler receiver Charley Hennigan, whose 10 catches for 214 yards and three scores made him the first player to post a 200-yard game against the Chargers. Blanda was 20 of 33 for 351 yards, four touchdowns and an interception. The solitary interception marked the only time all season the Chargers failed to claim two or more.

==== Week 14: vs. Buffalo Bills ====
Week Fourteen: Buffalo Bills at San Diego Chargers – Game summary

Quarter	1	2	3	4	Total
Bills	10	0	0	0	**10**
Chargers	0	14	14	0	**28**

at Balboa Stadium, San Diego, California

- Date: December 10
- Game weather: 57 °F (13.9 °C), relative humidity 62%, wind 10 mph
- Game attendance: 24,486
- Box score

Game information

**First quarter**

- BUF – Bill Shockley 20-yard field goal, 10:23. Bills 3–0. **Drive: 9 plays, 74 yards.**
- BUF – Don McDonald 24-yard fumble return (Billy Atkins kick), 4:40. Bills 10–0.

**Second quarter**

- SDG – Keith Lincoln 57-yard punt return (George Blair kick), 14:42. Bills 10–7.
- SDG – Bill Hudson 5-yard interception return (George Blair kick), 1:50. Chargers 14–10.

**Third quarter**

- SDG – Paul Lowe 4-yard run (George Blair kick), 6:18. Chargers 21–10.
- SDG – Dave Kocourek 76-yard pass from Jack Kemp (George Blair kick), 2:08. Chargers 28–10. **Drive: 2 plays, 79 yards.**

**Fourth quarter**

- No scoring plays.

**Top passers**

- SDG – Jack Kemp – 11/21, 213 yards, TD, 2 INT
- BUF – Johnny Green – 11/25, 152 yards

**Top rushers**

- SDG – Paul Lowe – 14 rushes, 57 yards, TD
- BUF – Art Baker – 31 rushes, 117 yards

**Top receivers**

- SDG – Dave Kocourek – 3 receptions, 175 yards, TD
- BUF – Elbert Dubenion – 3 receptions, 69 yards

The Chargers' 10th and 11th return touchdowns of the season saw them win despite gaining only seven first downs. After a Buffalo field goal, the Bill's defense accounted for the game's first touchdown, returning a Kemp fumble 24 yards for a 10–0 lead. San Diego struck back at the start of the 2nd quarter when Lincoln raced 57 yards down the right sideline for the first punt-return touchdown in franchise history. Shortly before halftime, Faison deflected a pass which Hudson then intercepted and returned 5 yards for a touchdown, putting the Chargers ahead to stay. In the second half, Lowe's short run and Kocourek's long reception completed the scoring. Buffalo reached the Charger 1-yard line twice in the final quarter, but turned the ball over on downs each time.

Kocourek finished with 175 yards and a touchdown from just 3 catches.

==== Week 15: vs. Boston Patriots ====
Week Fifteen: New England Patriots at San Diego Chargers – Game summary

Quarter	1	2	3	4	Total
Patriots	17	10	7	7	**41**
Chargers	0	0	0	0	**0**

at Balboa Stadium, San Diego, California

- Date: December 17
- Game weather: 53 °F (11.7 °C), relative humidity 80%, wind 7 mph
- Game attendance: 21,339
- Box score

Game information

**First quarter**

- BOS – Gino Cappelletti 40-yard field goal, 2:54. Patriots 3–0. **Drive: 14 plays, 47 yards.**
- BOS – Jim Colclough 33-yard pass from Babe Parilli (Gino Cappelletti kick), 0:29. Patriots 10–0. **Drive: 1 play, 33 yards.**
- BOS – Don Webb 31-yard interception return (Gino Cappelletti kick), 0:00. Patriots 17–0.

**Second quarter**

- BOS – Billy Lott 5-yard run (Gino Cappelletti kick), 7:01. Patriots 24–0. **Drive: 6 plays, 49 yards.**
- BOS – Gino Cappelletti 38-yard field goal, 0:42. Patriots 27–0. **Drive: 7 plays, 48 yards.**

**Third quarter**

- BOS – Gino Cappelletti 7-yard pass from Babe Parilli (Gino Cappelletti kick), 2:36. Patriots 34–0. **Drive: 4 plays, 29 yards.**

**Fourth quarter**

- BOS – Don Webb 20-yard blocked punt return (Gino Cappelletti kick), 2:29. Patriots 41–0.

**Top passers**

- BOS – Babe Parilli – 9/20, 178 yards, 2 TD, 2 INT
- SDG – Jack Kemp – 9/26, 163 yards, 4 INT

**Top rushers**

- BOS – Billy Lott – 20 rushes, 94 yards, TD
- SDG – Paul Lowe – 7 rushes, 21 yards

**Top receivers**

- BOS – Gino Cappelletti – 4 receptions, 88 yards, TD
- SDG – Luther Hayes – 3 receptions, 100 yards

Most of San Diego's starters played a major part in the final regular-season game, but they were nonetheless routed at home by a Boston side who had started the day still competing for a place in the AFL title game (Houston's win in Oakland would keep them out, and prevent a playoff for the division title). The Chargers crossed midfield only three times in fifteen possessions, with their best penetration being the Boston 31; they already trailed 24–0 at that point, and the drive ended when Kemp threw the third of his four interceptions. Don Webb scored with both an interception return and a blocked punt return, and the Patriots exceeded the 35–0 margin of their previous road win over the Chargers.

Despite the one-sided defeat, Hayes caught 3 passes for 100 yards, while Harris and Zeman added to San Diego's record-setting interceptions haul.

== Standings ==
AFL Western Division
	W	L	T	PCT	DIV	PF	PA	STK
San Diego Chargers	12	2	0	.857	6–0	396	219	L1
Dallas Texans	6	8	0	.429	4–2	334	343	W2
Denver Broncos	3	11	0	.214	1–5	251	432	L7
Oakland Raiders	2	12	0	.143	1–5	237	458	L6

Note: Tie games were not officially counted in the standings in the AFL.

== Playoffs ==
Round	Date	Opponent	Result	Venue	Attendance	Recap
Championship	December 24, 1961	Houston Oilers	L 3–10	Balboa Stadium	29,556	Recap

=== Game summary ===
==== AFL championship game: vs. Houston Oilers ====
AFL championship game: Houston Oilers at San Diego Chargers – Game summary

Quarter	1	2	3	4	Total
Oilers	0	3	7	0	10
Chargers	0	0	0	3	3

at Balboa Stadium, San Diego, California

- Date: December 24
- Game weather: 53 °F (12 °C), relative humidity 77%, wind 6 mph
- Game attendance: 29,556
- TV announcers (ABC): Jack Buck, George Ratterman and Bob Neal
- Box score

Game information

First quarter

- No scoring plays.

Second quarter

- HOU – George Blanda 46-yard field goal, 6:54. Oilers 3–0. Drive: 4 plays, 0 yards.

Third quarter

- HOU – Billy Cannon 35-yard pass from George Blanda (George Blanda kick), 3:21. Oilers 10–0. Drive: 10 plays, 80 yards.

Fourth quarter

- SDG – George Blair 12-yard field goal, 14:21. Oilers 10–3. Drive: 7 plays, 33 yards.

Top passers

- HOU – George Blanda – 18/40, 160 yards, TD, 5 INT
- SDG – Jack Kemp – 17/32, 226 yards, 4 INT

Top rushers

- HOU – Charley Tolar – 16 rushes, 52 yards
- SDG – Bo Roberson – 8 rushes, 37 yards

Top receivers

- HOU – Billy Cannon – 5 receptions, 53 yards, TD
- SDG – Dave Kocourek – 7 receptions, 123 yards

San Diego met the Eastern Division-winning Houston Oilers (10–3–1) to decide the 1961 AFL title, in a rematch of the 1960 championship game.

Houston repeated as AFL Champions, edging a defensive battle that saw a combined 13 turnovers. Kemp lost a fumble in his own half on the Chargers' third play from scrimmage, but Whitehead soon got the ball back with an interception. Kocourek's 40-yard catch on the following play had the Chargers threatening to open the scoring, but Kemp threw an end zone interception. Kemp continued to struggle on the next Charger drive, again fumbling in his own territory. Houston reached the Chargers' 16 yard line, where they lined up for a field goal attempt that was ruined by a bad snap; the ball ran behind the holder, and was eventually covered by Maury Schleicher at the Charger 43. Houston reached the San Diego 22 on their next drive, but Blanda was intercepted by McNeil in the end zone. Soon afterwards, Maguire sliced a punt off the edge of his foot, and it travelled only 9 yards to his own 46. Houston failed to advance the ball, but Blanda's 46-yard field goal was good to open the scoring. Kemp committed his fourth turnover of the half on the next drive when he threw his second interception; Houston receiver Bill Groman tried a pass on the next play, but that too was intercepted, by Zeman. The Chargers then drove from their own 35 to the Houston 37, but Blair missed a 44-yard field goal and the score at halftime was 3–0 to the Oilers.

The turnovers continued in the 3rd quarter, with a deep pass from Kemp being intercepted on the second play. The Oilers drove from their own 22 to the Charger 12, where Blanda again threw an end zone interception, this time to Zeman. Houston did find the end zone on their next possession, converting a 4th and inches during an 80-yard drive that ended with Blanda's 35-yard touchdown pass to Billy Cannon. Blanda was intercepted by McNeil on the next Oiler drive, and Norton's 28-yard catch put San Diego in position for Blair's 12-yard field goal, reducing the deficit to seven points early in the final quarter. Zeman intercepted a deep pass at his own 2 on the next possession, before both teams punted twice, and San Diego began their final possession on their own 37 yard line. An 8-yard Kemp completion, a 5-yard Roberson run and a13-yard pass interference penalty moved the ball to the Houston 37, from where Kemp threw his fourth interception, and Houston ran out the clock.

Whitehead, McNeil and Zeman had two interceptions each. Kemp completed 17 of 32 passes for 226 yards, accounting for all six Charger turnovers with four interceptions and two lost fumbles. Kocourek caught 7 passes for 123 yards. As of 2022, the ten combined interceptions by the two teams are tied for the most in any playoff game, while the Chargers' six interceptions are the most by a team who lost a playoff game.

The game was marred by a scuffle at the final whistle, with Zeman knocking field judge Johnny Morrow to the ground as Gillman argued with the official about his performance during the game. The Chargers lost and in 1962 missed the playoffs the first time in the season.

== Awards ==
=== Internal ===
Between the final regular season game and the AFL championship game, the Chargers held their first annual awards banquet. Kemp won $500 as the team MVP; though Allen had broken his ankle during the week 9 victory over New York and missed the rest of the season, he was still honored with two awards. He had claimed five interceptions before the injury.

Award	Winner
Team MVP	Jack Kemp
Most Inspirational Player	Chuck Allen
Rookie of the Year	Chuck Allen

=== External ===
Eleven Chargers were named to the Western Division's team for the AFL All-Star game, and six to the Associated Press 1961 All-AFL Team, with four receiving both honors. In addition, Faison won both the AP and UPI awards as Rookie of the Year.

Player	Position	All-Star	All-Pro
George Blair	Defensive back / Kicker		Yes
Earl Faison	Defensive end	Yes	Yes
Dick Harris	Cornerback	Yes	Yes
Bill Hudson	Defensive tackle		Yes
Emil Karas	Linebacker		Yes
Ernie Ladd	Defensive tackle	Yes	
Jack Kemp	Quarterback		Yes
Dave Kocourek	Flanker		Yes
Charlie McNeil	Safety	Yes	Yes
Ron Mix	Tackle	Yes	Yes
Ron Nery	Defensive end	Yes	
Don Norton	End		Yes
Ernie Wright	Tackle		Yes
