= 1961 New York Titans season =

1961 season of AFL team New York Titans

- Owner: Harry Wismer
- Head coach: Sammy Baugh
- Home stadium: Polo Grounds

Results
- Record: 7–7
- Division place: 3rd AFL East
- Playoffs: Did not qualify

The 1961 New York Titans season was the second season for the team in the American Football League (AFL). The Titans finished with a record of 7–7.

== Draft picks ==
Round	Player	Position	College
1	Tom Brown	Guard	Minnesota
2	Herb Adderley	Halfback	Michigan State
5	Tom Matte	Quarterback	Ohio State
6	Bill Brown	Fullback	Illinois
7	Fred Mautino	Offensive end	Syracuse
8	Harold Beaty	Tackle	Oklahoma State
9	Bernie Casey	Fullback	Bowling Green
10	Joe Scibelli	Tackle	Notre Dame
11	Art Gilmore	Halfback	Oregon State
12	Norris Stevenson	Halfback	Missouri
13	Joe Wendryhoski	Tackle	Illinois
14	Jim Cunningham	Fullback	Pittsburgh
15	Irv Cross	Offensive end	Northwestern
16	Jerry Steffen	Halfback	Colorado
17	Mike Plye	Tackle	Yale
18	Alfred Bentley	Offensive end	Arkansas State
19	Jim Kerr	Halfback	Penn State
20	Neil Plumley	Tackle	Oregon State
21	Bob Brooks	Fullback	Ohio
22	Wayne Fontes	Halfback	Michigan State
23	Mickey Walker	Halfback	Michigan State
24	Howard Dyer	Quarterback	Virginia Military Institution
25	Andy Griffith	Halfback	American International
26	Bob Smith	Halfback	UCLA
27	Moses Gray	Tackle	Indiana
28	Fred Cox	Halfback	Pittsburgh
30	William Mimerly	Halfback	Connecticut

== Roster ==
1961 New York Titans roster
Quarterbacks (QB): 12 Al Dorow; 19 Bob Scrabis; Running backs (RB): 35 Bob Brooks; 45 Dick Christy; 31 Bill Mathis; 25 Mel West; Wide receivers (WR): 13 Don Maynard; 84 Art Powell; 10 Bobby Renn; Tight ends (TE): 88 Thurlow Cooper TE	Offensive linemen (OL): 70 Gene Cockrell T; 56 Roger Ellis C; 52 Mike Hudock C; 78 Jack Klotz T; 68 John McMullan G; 67 Bob Mischak G; 62 Bob O'Neil G; Defensive linemen (DL): 73 Moses Gray DT; 72 Dick Guesman DT/K; 74 Nick Mumley DE; 75 Tom Saidock DT; 76 Sid Youngelman DE	Linebackers (LB): 57 Hubert Bobo MLB; 82 Ed Cooke OLB; 64 Jerry Fields MLB; 60 Larry Grantham OLB; Defensive backs (DB): 29 Johnny Bookman CB; 23 Dick Felt CB; 15 Don Flynn SS; 33 Paul Hynes CB; 40 Dainard Paulson FS; 22 Lee Riley SS; Special teams (ST): 20 Curley Johnson P	Reserve: 12 Don Allard QB (IR); 27 Jim Apple RB (IR); 50 Jim Furey LB (IR); 73 Proverb Jacobs DE/DT (IR); 15 Dick Jamieson QB (IR); Rookies in italics

== Schedule ==
Week	Date	Opponent	Result	Record	Venue	Attendance	Recap
1	September 9	at **Boston Patriots**	**W** 21–20	1–0	Boston University Field	16,684	Recap
2	September 17	at **Buffalo Bills**	**L** 31–41	1–1	War Memorial Stadium	15,584	Recap
3	September 24	Denver Broncos	**W** 35–28	2–1	Polo Grounds	14,381	Recap
4	October 1	**Boston Patriots**	**W** 37–30	3–1	Polo Grounds	15,189	Recap
5	Bye						
6	October 15	San Diego Chargers	**L** 10–25	3–2	Polo Grounds	25,136	Recap
7	October 22	at Denver Broncos	**L** 10–27	3–3	Bears Stadium	12,508	Recap
8	October 29	at Oakland Raiders	**W** 14–6	4–3	Candlestick Park	7,138	Recap
9	November 5	at San Diego Chargers	**L** 13–48	4–4	Balboa Stadium	33,391	Recap
10	November 11	Oakland Raiders	**W** 23–12	5–4	Polo Grounds	16,311	Recap
11	November 19	at **Houston Oilers**	**L** 13–49	5–5	Jeppesen Stadium	33,428	Recap
12	November 23	**Buffalo Bills**	**W** 21–14	6–5	Polo Grounds	12,023	Recap
13	December 3	Dallas Texans	**W** 28–7	7–5	Polo Grounds	14,117	Recap
14	December 10	**Houston Oilers**	**L** 21–48	7–6	Polo Grounds	9,462	Recap
15	December 17	at Dallas Texans	**L** 24–35	7–7	Cotton Bowl	12,500	Recap
Note: Intra-division opponents are in **bold** text.

== Standings ==
AFL Eastern Division
	W	L	T	PCT	DIV	PF	PA	STK
Houston Oilers	10	3	1	.769	4–1–1	513	242	W9
Boston Patriots	9	4	1	.692	2–3–1	413	313	W4
New York Titans	7	7	0	.500	3–3	301	390	L2
Buffalo Bills	6	8	0	.429	2–4	294	342	L1

Note: Tie games were not officially counted in the standings in the AFL.
