= 1961 Boston Patriots season =

Season of American Football League team the Boston Patriots

- Owner: Billy Sullivan
- General manager: Edward McKeever
- Head coach: Lou Saban (fired: 2–3); Mike Holovak (interim: 7–1–1)
- Home stadium: Boston University Field

Results
- Record: 9–4–1
- Division place: 2nd AFL Eastern
- Playoffs: Did not qualify
- AFL All-Stars: LB Tom Addison; DB Fred Bruney; WR Gino Cappelletti; DE Bob Dee; RB Larry Garron; DT Jim Lee Hunt; G Chuck Leo

Uniform

The 1961 Boston Patriots season was the franchise's second season in the American Football League They finished with nine wins, four losses, and one tie, in second place in the AFL's Eastern Division. This was the first season that the now famous "Pat Patriot" logo appeared on the helmets. The logo itself would see minor updates throughout the years before it was finally retired after the 1992 season, after 32 years.

== Staff ==
1961 Boston Patriots staff
Front office: President – Billy Sullivan; General Manager – Edward McKeever; Head coaches: Head Coach – Lou Saban (fired, 2–3); Mike Holovak (interim, 7–1–1); Offensive coaches: Offensive backfield – Mike Holovak; Offensive line – Red Miller	Defensive coaches: Defensive line – Jerry Smith; Defensive backfield – Joe Collier

== Season summary ==
In the off-season, the team acquired quarterback Babe Parilli from the Oakland Raiders, himself a former starter for the NFL's Green Bay Packers. After a 2–3 start and two consecutive losses, the team fired head coach Lou Saban on the night of Tuesday, October 10, and replaced him with offensive backfield coach Mike Holovak, formerly the head coach at Boston College. The change was a positive one, as the team was 7–1–1 under Holovak and finished on a four-game winning streak, capped with a road shutout of the Western Division champion San Diego Chargers in the season finale, the team which scored 38 points on them in Boston in Saban's last game.

The Patriots' 9–4–1 record put them in second place in the Eastern Division, one game behind Houston; the Oilers went on to win the league championship with a 10–3 win over the Chargers. This was the first season in which Boston used their "Pat the Patriot" logo on their helmets.

== Draft picks ==
Round	Player	Position	College
1	Tommy Mason	Half back	Tulane
2	Rip Hawkins	Center	North Carolina
3	Danny LaRose	Tight end	Missouri
4	Mike Zeno	Guard	Virginia Tech
5	Fran Tarkenton	Quarterback	Georgia
6	Larry Eisenhauer ^{1}	Tackle	Boston College
7	Paul Terhes	Quarterback	Bucknell
8	Charles Long ^{1}	Guard	Tennessee-Chattanooga
9	Roland Lakes	Center	Wichita
10	Richard Mueller	Offensive end	Kentucky
11	Mel West	Center	Missouri
12	Wayne Harris	Center	Arkansas
13	Dan Underwood	Tackle	McNeese State
14	James Wright	Quarterback	Memphis State
16	George Balthazar	Tackle	Tennessee A&I
17	Ray Ratkowski	Halfback	Notre Dame
18	Tom Rodgers	Halfback	Kentucky
19	Joe Bellino	Halfback	Navy
20	Clarence Childs	Halfback	Florida A&M
21	Don Oakes	Guard	Virginia Tech
22	Bob Johnson	Offensive end	Michigan
23	Darrell DeDecker	Center	Illinois
24	Don Webb	Halfback	Iowa State
25	Bob Minihane	Tackle	Boston
26	Charley Granger	Tackle	Southern
27	Terry Huxhold	Tackle	Wisconsin
28	Bryant Harvard	Quarterback	Auburn
29	Ernie McMillan	Tackle	Illinois
30	George Hultz	Tackle	Mississippi Southern

== Schedule ==
=== Regular season ===
Week	Date	Opponent	Result	Record	Venue	Attendance	Recap
1	September 9	**New York Titans**	**L** 20–21	0–1	Boston University Field	16,683	Recap
2	September 16	Denver Broncos	**W** 45–17	1–1	Boston University Field	14,479	Recap
3	September 23	at Buffalo Bills	**W** 23–21	2–1	War Memorial Stadium	21,504	Recap
4	October 1	at **New York Titans**	**L** 30–37	2–2	Polo Grounds	15,189	Recap
5	October 7	San Diego Chargers	**L** 27–38	2–3	Boston University Field	17,748	Recap
6	October 13	**Houston Oilers**	**T** 31–31	2–3–1	Boston University Field	15,070	Recap
7	October 22	**Buffalo Bills**	**W** 52–21	3–3–1	Boston University Field	9,398	Recap
8	October 29	at Dallas Texans	**W** 18–17	4–3–1	Cotton Bowl	20,500	Recap
9	November 3	Dallas Texans	**W** 28–21	5–3–1	Boston University Field	25,063	Recap
10	November 12	at **Houston Oilers**	**L** 15–27	5–4–1	Jeppesen Stadium	35,649	Recap
11	November 17	Oakland Raiders	**W** 20–17	6–4–1	Boston University Field	17,169	Recap
12	Bye						
13	December 3	at Denver Broncos	**W** 28–24	7–4–1	Bears Stadium	9,303	Recap
14	December 9	at Oakland Raiders	**W** 35–21	8–4–1	Candlestick Park	6,500	Recap
15	December 17	at San Diego Chargers	**W** 41–0	9–4–1	Balboa Stadium	21,339	Recap
Note: Intra-division opponents are in **bold** text.

== Standings ==
AFL Eastern Division
	W	L	T	PCT	DIV	PF	PA	STK
Houston Oilers	10	3	1	.769	4–1–1	513	242	W9
Boston Patriots	9	4	1	.692	2–3–1	413	313	W4
New York Titans	7	7	0	.500	3–3	301	390	L2
Buffalo Bills	6	8	0	.429	2–4	294	342	L1

Note: Tie games were not officially counted in the standings in the AFL.

== Roster ==
Boston Patriots 1961 roster
Quarterbacks: 15 Babe Parilli; 11 Butch Songin; Running backs: 22 Ron Burton; 30 Jim Crawford; 40 Larry Garron; 32 Billy Lott; 44 Gerhard Schwedes; Wide receivers: 20 Gino Cappelletti K; 81 Jim Colclough; Tight ends: 45 Thomas Stephens	Offensive linemen: 65 Houston Antwine G; 54 Walt Cudzik C; 74 Jerry DeLucca T; 70 Milt Graham T; 63 Chuck Leo G; 76 Charlie Long T; 64 Tony Sardisco G; 50 Bob Yates C; Defensive linemen: 89 Bob Dee DE; 72 Larry Eisenhauer DE; 79 Jim Lee Hunt DT; 62 Dick Klein DT; 61 Leroy Moore DE	Linebackers: 53 Tom Addison OLB; 60 Rommie Loudd OLB; 83 Harry Jacobs MLB; Defensive backs: 41 Walter Beach CB; 33 Fred Bruney FS; 23 Ron Hall SS; 34 Chuck Shonta CB; 31 Clyde Washington CB; 48 Don Webb CB; Special teams: 14 Tom Yewcic P/RB/QB	Reserve list: 24 Joe Johnson TE (IR); -- George McGee T (Military); 25 Ross O'Hanley S (Military); 51 Frank Robotti LB (IR); 80 Jack Rudolph LB (IR); 75 John Simerson T (IR); 42 Bob Soltis S (IR)

== Notes and references ==
=== General references ===
- "1961 Boston Patriots". Football @ JT-SW.com. John Troan. 2002.. For game-by-game results
- "1961 Boston Patriots Roster". Football @ JT-SW.com. John Troan. 2002. Archived from the original on April 25, 2007.. For team roster
- "New England Patriots (1960–present)". Sports E-cyclopedia. Tank Productions. 2007. Archived from the original on April 17, 2007.. For season summary
