= Bob Brooks (American football) =

American football player (born 1938)

No. 35
- Position: Fullback

Personal information
- Born: May 3, 1938; United States
- Listed height: 6 ft 0 in (1.83 m)
- Listed weight: 215 lb (98 kg)

Career information
- High school: George Rogers Clark (Winchester, KY)
- College: Ohio
- NFL draft: 1961: 9th round, 122nd overall pick

Career history
- New York Titans (1961)

Career AFL statistics
- Rushing attempts: 15
- Rushing yards: 55
- Rushing touchdowns: 0
- Games played: 14
- Stats at Pro Football Reference

Robert Author Brooks (born May 3, 1938) is an American former professional football fullback for the New York Titans of the American Football League (AFL). Brooks was drafted by the Detroit Lions of the National Football League in the 9th round (122 overall), but chose to sign with the Titans who drafted him in the 21st round with the 166th overall pick. He also played for the Toledo Tornadoes of the UFL.

== Early life ==
Brooks attended George Rogers Clark High School. He also went to Oliver High School.

== College career ==
Brooks played for Ohio University. He was a two-time All-MAC honoree who was the leading rusher with 2,364 yards in 498 attempts, along with 21 touchdowns. He went to the All-American Bowl.

The football team he was part of was inducted into the Kermit Blosser Ohio Athletics Hall of Fame in 2012.

== Professional career ==
Brooks signed with the New York Titans on March 18, 1961. He played in all 14 games for the Titans during the 1961 AFL season. He played for the Toledo Tornadoes of the UFL from 1962 to 1963.

== Career statistics ==
Year	Team	GP	Att	Yds	Avg	TD
1961	New York Titans	14	15	55	3.7	0
Career		14	15	55	3.7	0
