= Dave Webster =

American football player (1937–2006)

No. 21
- Position: Cornerback

Personal information
- Born: July 23, 1937; Atlanta, Texas, U.S.
- Died: June 23, 2006 (aged 68)

Career information
- College: Prairie View A&M
- NFL draft: 1960: undrafted

Career history
- Dallas Texans (1960–1961)

Awards and highlights
- TSN All-AFL (1961); Prairie View A&M University Athletic Hall of Fame; AFL All-Star (1961)
- Stats at Pro Football Reference

David A. Webster Jr. (July 23, 1937 – June 23, 2006) in Atlanta, Texas, was an American professional football player who was a cornerback for two seasons with the American Football League's (AFL) Dallas Texans (1960–1961). He was an All-AFL selection in 1961.

== Early life ==
Webster was the son of David A. Webster Sr. and Eunice (Harper) Webster. He lived in Atlanta, Texas, until he was 13 years old, when he moved to Houston with his mother. He was educated in the Atlanta Public Schools, Holy Cross Lutheran schools and Jack Yates High School.

He attended Yates High School in Houston and graduated as the valedictorian of his class. He also helped his Yates team to a city championship and a state championship in football as the starting quarterback.

== College career ==
After Yates, Webster attended Prairie View A&M University on an academic scholarship, where he played tennis and football for College Football Hall of Fame coach Billy Nicks.

During his tenure at Prairie View A&M University, Webster led the football team to the 1958 Black college football national championship and won All-SWAC (Southwestern Athletic Conference) honors in 1958 and 1959. He was also an All-American quarterback in 1958. In 1959, he was co-champion of the SWAC tennis doubles alongside Clifton Johnson.

During this time in college, he was a member of the Prairie View Panthers Club.

== AFL career ==
In 1960, "Can Head", as he came to be known by close friends and teammates, was selected to play football for the Dallas Texans under Pro Football Hall of Fame owner Lamar Hunt and coach Hank Stram. The Dallas Texans later became the Kansas City Chiefs in 1963 when the franchise moved from Texas to Missouri. Even though Webster was an All-American quarterback in college, he played defensive back because blacks were not allowed to play the quarterback position in the professional football ranks at that time. He paved the way by overcoming racial injustice and adversity as one of the first blacks to play professional football for the American Football League and he was one of two black players on the Texans/Chiefs (in those days, there was a "two blacks per team" quota in effect). Despite the circumstances, he led the team in interceptions and became an AFL All-Pro defensive back in 1961. His career came to an abrupt end when his leg was broken in a pre-season game in 1962; the Texans went on to win the AFL championship.

== After football ==
After graduating from Prairie View A&M University's School of Engineering with a BS in electrical engineering in 1962, he worked for the Bendix Corporation in Kansas City, Missouri. In 1971, Webster moved to Michigan to work for Ford Motor Company. While at Ford, he earned a Masters of Business Administration (MBA) from Central Michigan University in 1975. In 2001, Webster retired from Ford Motor Company and in 2004 he moved back home to Texas from Michigan to become a farmer again.

== See also ==
- List of American Football League players
