= 1961 Dallas Texans season =

NFL team season

- Owner: Lamar Hunt
- General manager: Jack Steadman
- Head coach: Hank Stram
- Home stadium: Cotton Bowl

Results
- Record: 6–8
- Division place: 2nd AFL Western
- Playoffs: Did not qualify
- AFL All-Stars: HB Abner Haynes; LB Sherrill Headrick; LB E. J. Holub; DE Mel Branch; TE Chris Burford; QB Cotton Davidson; G Bill Krisher; C Jon Gilliam; DT Paul Rochester; DB Dave Webster

The 1961 Dallas Texans season was the 2nd season for the Dallas Texans as a professional AFL franchise; They finished the season with a 6–8 record and second-place finish in the AFL Western Conference.

The club moved its training camp to Lamar Hunt's alma mater of Southern Methodist University and started the regular season at 3–1 before hitting a six-game losing skid, the longest such streak of head coach Hank Stram's tenure with the franchise. One of those losses was a 28–21 decision in a Friday night contest at Boston (11/3) which featured a bizarre ending as a raincoat-clad fan knocked down a potential game-tying TD from Cotton Davidson to Chris Burford on the game's final play. The team rebounded to claim wins in three of its final four contests to finish 6–8, marking the club's second straight finish behind the Chargers in the AFL West standings.

== Draft ==
| Round | Player | Position | College |
|---|---|---|---|
| 1 | E.J. Holub ^{1} | Center | Texas Tech |
| 2 | Bob Lilly | Tackle | TCU |
| 3 | Jim Tyrer ^{1,2} | Tackle | Ohio State |
| 4 | Claude Moorman | Offensive End | Duke |
| 5 | Jerry Mays ^{1,2} | Tackle | Southern Methodist |
| 7 | Fred Arbanas ^{1,2} | Offensive End | Michigan State |
| 8 | John O'Day | Tackle | Miami |
| 9 | Dick Mills | Tackle | Pittsburgh |
| 10 | Jerry Daniels | Tackle | Mississippi |
| 11 | Marvin Tibbets | Halfback | Georgia Tech |
| 12 | Paul Hynes | Halfback | Louisiana Tech |
| 13 | Glynn Gregory | Halfback | Southern Methodist |
| 14 | Curtis McClinton ^{1,3} | Halfback | Kansas |
| 15 | Ed Nutting | Tackle | Georgia Tech |
| 15 | Roy Lee Rambo | Guard | TCU |
| 16 | Aaron Thomas | Offensive End | Oregon State |
| 17 | Jarrell Williams | Halfback | Arkansas |
| 18 | Ron Hartline | Fullback | Oklahoma |
| 19 | Frank Jackson | Halfback | Southern Methodist |
| 20 | Bob Lane | Offensive End | Baylor |
| 21 | Dick Thornton | Quarterback | Northwestern |
| 22 | Ed Sharockman | Halfback | Pittsburgh |
| 23 | Lou Zivkovich | Tackle | New Mexico State |
| 24 | Pat Dye | Guard | Georgia |
| 25 | Ray Ramsey | Quarterback | Adams State |
| 26 | Danny House | Halfback | Davidson |
| 27 | Bob Schloredt | Quarterback | Washington |
| 28 | Bill Stine | Guard | Michigan |
| 29 | Lonnie Caddell | Fullback | Rice |
| 30 | Cedric Price | Offensive End | Kansas State |

== Personnel ==
=== Roster ===
1961 Dallas Texans roster
| Quarterbacks: 19 Cotton Davidson P/K; 15 Randy Duncan; 14 Tom Greene; Running Backs: 32 Bo Dickinson; 28 Abner Haynes; 22 Frank Jackson; 33 Billy Pricer; 30 Jack Spikes K; Wide Receivers / Flankers: 82 Charlie Barnes; 88 Chris Burford; 42 Johnny Robinson; Tight Ends: 81 Max Boydston; 88 Tony Romeo | Offensive Linemen: 61 John Cadwell G; 74 Jerry Cornelison T; 79 Charley Diamond T/G; 62 Sid Fournet G; 65 Jon Gilliam C; 64 Bill Krisher G; 60 Al Reynolds G; 63 Marvin Terrell G; 77 Jim Tyrer T; Defensive Linemen: 87 Mel Branch DE; 71 Ray Collins DT; 89 Luther Jeralds DE; 75 Jerry Mays DE/DT; 86 Paul Miller DE; 76 Walter Napier DT; 72 Paul Rochester DT | Linebackers: 54 Ted Greene OLB; 69 Sherrill Headrick MLB; 55 E. J. Holub OLB; 35 Smokey Stover OLB; Defensive Backs: 45 Dave Grayson RCB; 32 Jack Johnson DB; 44 Edward Kelley RCB; 25 Doyle Nix DB; 21 Dave Webster DB; 48 Duane Wood LCB | Reserve List: 84 Fred Arbanas TE (IR); 56 Walt Corey LB (Military); Rookies in italics |

== Preseason ==
The Texans began the preseason with four consecutive victories before falling in the final exhibition game in San Diego.

=== Schedule ===
| Week | Date | Opponent | Result | Record | Venue | Attendance |
|---|---|---|---|---|---|---|
| 1 | August 5 | New York Titans | W 39–28 | 1–0 | Cotton Bowl | Not reported |
| 2 | August 12 | Denver Broncos | W 31–13 | 2–0 | Midland, TX | 10,000 |
| 3 | August 18 | at Buffalo Bills | W 35–26 | 3–0 | Boston University Field | 11,166 |
| 4 | August 25 | Denver Broncos | W 29–27 | 4–0 | Farrington Field (Fort Worth, TX) | 21,700 |
| 5 | September 3 | San Diego Chargers | L 10–31 | 4–1 | Balboa Stadium | 15,232 |

== Regular season ==
The Texans fell from contention after dropping six straight games in mid-season.

=== Schedule ===
| Week | Date | Opponent | Result | Record | Venue | Attendance | Recap |
|---|---|---|---|---|---|---|---|
| 1 | September 10 | **San Diego Chargers** | **L** 10–26 | 0–1 | Cotton Bowl | 24,500 | Recap |
| 2 | Bye | | | | | | |
| 3 | September 24 | at **Oakland Raiders** | **W** 42–35 | 1–1 | Candlestick Park | 6,700 | Recap |
| 4 | October 1 | Houston Oilers | **W** 26–21 | 2–1 | Cotton Bowl | 28,000 | Recap |
| 5 | October 8 | at **Denver Broncos** | **W** 19–12 | 3–1 | Bears Stadium | 14,500 | Recap |
| 6 | October 15 | at Buffalo Bills | **L** 24–27 | 3–2 | War Memorial Stadium | 20,678 | Recap |
| 7 | October 22 | at Houston Oilers | **L** 7–38 | 3–3 | Jeppesen Stadium | 23,228 | Recap |
| 8 | October 29 | Boston Patriots | **L** 17–18 | 3–4 | Cotton Bowl | 20,500 | Recap |
| 9 | November 3 | at Boston Patriots | **L** 21–28 | 3–5 | Boston University Field | 25,063 | Recap |
| 10 | November 12 | Buffalo Bills | **L** 20–30 | 3–6 | Cotton Bowl | 15,000 | Recap |
| 11 | November 19 | at **San Diego Chargers** | **L** 14–24 | 3–7 | Balboa Stadium | 33,788 | Recap |
| 12 | November 26 | **Oakland Raiders** | **W** 43–11 | 4–7 | Cotton Bowl | 14,500 | Recap |
| 13 | December 3 | at New York Titans | **L** 7–28 | 4–8 | Polo Grounds | 14,117 | Recap |
| 14 | December 10 | **Denver Broncos** | **W** 49–21 | 5–8 | Cotton Bowl | 8,000 | Recap |
| 15 | December 17 | New York Titans | **W** 35–24 | 6–8 | Cotton Bowl | 12,500 | Recap |
Note: Intra-division opponents are in **bold** text.

== Standings ==
AFL Western Division
| | W | L | T | PCT | DIV | PF | PA | STK |
|---|---|---|---|---|---|---|---|---|
| San Diego Chargers | 12 | 2 | 0 | .857 | 6–0 | 396 | 219 | L1 |
| Dallas Texans | 6 | 8 | 0 | .429 | 4–2 | 334 | 343 | W2 |
| Denver Broncos | 3 | 11 | 0 | .214 | 1–5 | 251 | 432 | L7 |
| Oakland Raiders | 2 | 12 | 0 | .143 | 1–5 | 237 | 458 | L6 |

Note: Tie games were not officially counted in the standings in the AFL.
