= Hubert Bobo =

American football player (1934–1999)

No. 84, 57
- Position: Linebacker

Personal information
- Born: July 2, 1934; Athens, Ohio, U.S.
- Died: September 1, 1999 (aged 65); Nevada, U.S.
- Listed height: 6 ft 0 in (1.83 m)
- Listed weight: 220 lb (100 kg)

Career information
- College: Ohio State
- NFL draft: 1957: 13th round, 146th overall pick

Career history
- Hamilton Tiger-Cats (1958); Los Angeles Chargers (1960); New York Titans (1961–1962)

Awards and highlights
- National champion (1954); Second-team All-Big Ten (1954)

Career AFL statistics
- Interceptions: 5
- Sacks: 2
- Stats at Pro Football Reference

Hubert Lee Bobo (July 2, 1934 – September 1, 1999) was an American professional football player who was a linebacker in the American Football League (AFL) and Canadian Football League (CFL). He played college football for the Ohio State Buckeyes, and then played in the AFL for the Los Angeles Chargers in 1960 and the New York Titans from 1961–1962. Hubert also played in the CFL during the 1958 season as a member of the Hamilton Tiger-Cats. Prior to his pro career, Bobo was a dominating force in high school football when he played as running back, linebacker, and kicker. Bobo still to this day holds several state of Ohio and national records for his efforts at the high school level. After his high school career ended, Bobo attended Ohio State University sharing a backfield with Bobby Watkins and Howard "Hopalong" Cassady helping lead the Buckeyes to an undefeated season and the 1954 National Championship.

== See also ==
- List of American Football League players
