= 1960 Little All-America college football team =

American college football all-star team

The 1960 Little All-America college football team is composed of college football players from small colleges and universities who were selected by the Associated Press (AP) as the best players at each position. For 1960, the AP selected three teams of 11 players each, with no separate defensive platoons.

Halfback Dale Mills of Kirksville State rushed for 1,343 and concluded his college career with 4,502 rushing yards and over 400 points scored.

Charles Fuller of San Francisco State rushed for 892 yards (7.2 yards per carry) and scored 104 points.

Bill Cooper of Muskungum rushed for 1,102 yards, 23 touchdowns, and scored 152 points. His coach, Ed Sherman, called him "the greatest player I've ever coached or seen in the Ohio Conference."

Bucknell quarterback Paul Terhes passed for 981 yards and nine touchdowns.

End John Simko of Augustana (South Dakota) broke a North Central Conference record with 53 receptions. He was the first Augustana player to receive first-team Little All-America honors.

Center Dick Grecni anchored the line for an undefeated Ohio team that outscored opponents, 269 to 34, and was recognized by both the AP and UPI as the small college champion.

== First team ==
Position	Player	Team
B	Paul Terhes	Bucknell
B	Dale Mills	Kirksville State
B	Charles Fuller	San Francisco State
B	Bill Cooper	Muskingum
E	Tom Hackler	Tennessee Tech
E	John Simko	Augustana (SD)
T	Charlie Long	Chattanooga
T	Willie Crafts	Texas A&I
G	George Asleson	Iowa State Teachers
G	Doug Brown	Fresno State
C	Dick Grecni	Ohio

== Second team ==
Position	Player	Team
B	Dennis Spurlock	Whitworth
B	Lee Farmer	Lenoir–Rhyne
B	Bernie Casey	Bowling Green
B	Joe Iacone	West Chester
E	Powell McClellan	Arkansas Tech
E	Al Ferrie	Wagner
T	Vester Flanagan	Humboldt State
T	Jim Larkin	Hillsdale
G	Joe Hinton	Louisiana Tech
G	Houston Antwine	Southern Illinois
C	Curtis Miranda	Florida A&M

== Third team ==
Position	Player	Team
B	Jerry Morgan	Iowa State Teachers
B	Roger Johnson	Whitewater State
B	Donald Lee Smith	Langston
B	Charles Miller	Austin
E	Bill Wiljanen	Michigan Tech
E	Willie Richardson	Jackson State
T	Jim Kelley	Johns Hopkins
T	Bill Ogden	Presbyterian
G	Dick DeMasi	Montclair State
G	Blayne Jones	Idaho State
C	Terry Fohs	Washington & Lee

== See also ==
- 1960 College Football All-America Team
