= Al Jamison =

American football player (1937–2021)

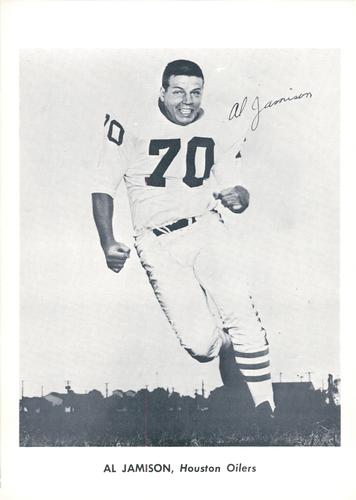

No. 70
- Position: Tackle

Personal information
- Born: May 11, 1937; Toledo, Ohio, U.S.
- Died: May 1, 2021 (aged 83); Columbus, Texas, U.S.
- Listed height: 6 ft 5 in (1.96 m)
- Listed weight: 250 lb (113 kg)

Career information
- High school: Toledo (OH) Libbey
- College: Colgate
- NFL draft: 1960: undrafted

Career history
- Houston Oilers (1960–1962)

Awards and highlights
- 2× AFL champion (1960, 1961); TSN All-AFL (1961); 2× AFL All-Star (1961, 1962); 2× Second-team All-Eastern (1956, 1957)
- Stats at Pro Football Reference

Alfred George Jamison (November 5, 1937 – May 1, 2021) was an American professional football player who was an offensive lineman in the American Football League (AFL) in the 1960s. Nicknamed "Al the Assassin" during his playing days for his chippy play up to and sometimes after the whistle, Jamison was a star offensive tackle for the Houston Oilers in the first three seasons of the new league.

Jamison played college football for the Colgate Raiders before be embarked on a pro career. He was an All-AFL tackle in 1961 and an American Football League Eastern Division All-Star in 1962. He played in the first three AFL Championship games and was a two-time league champion.

Jamison died on May 1, 2021, in Columbus, Texas, at age 83.

== See also ==
- Other American Football League players
