= Charlie Long =

American football player (1938–1989)

No. 76
- Positions: Offensive tackle, Guard

Personal information
- Born: April 6, 1938; Fyffe, Alabama, U.S.
- Died: December 16, 1989 (aged 51); Framingham, Massachusetts, U.S.

Career information
- College: Chattanooga
- AFL draft: 1961: 8th round, 59th overall pick

Career history
- Boston Patriots (1961–1969)

Awards and highlights
- 2× AFL All-Star (1962, 1963); Boston Patriots All-1960s Team; First-team Little All-American (1960)

Career statistics
- Games played: 124
- Games started: 96
- Stats at Pro Football Reference

Charles Long (April 6, 1938 – December 16, 1989) was an American football offensive tackle and guard. He played college football for the University of Tennessee at Chattanooga. In 1961, he joined the Boston Patriots of the American Football League (AFL). He played there for nine seasons and was a two-time AFL All-Star selection, and a member of the Patriots' All-1960s (AFL) Team.

== See also ==
- List of American Football League players
