= Jim Apple =

American football player (1938–1985)

No. 27
- Position: Halfback

Personal information
- Born: July 14, 1938; Belleville, New Jersey, U.S.
- Died: July 1985

Career information
- College: Upsala

Career history
- New York Titans (1961)

Career statistics
- Games played: 3
- Rushing attempts-yards: 7-2
- Touchdowns: 0
- Stats at Pro Football Reference

James Dunbar Apple (July 14, 1938 – July 1985) was a professional American football halfback in the American Football League (AFL) for the New York Titans in 1961. He played college football at Upsala College.

== See also ==
- List of American Football League players
