= Dick Grecni =

American football player (born 1938)

No. 50
- Position: Linebacker

Personal information
- Born: March 27, 1938; Akron, Ohio, U.S.
- Died: December 8, 2024 (aged 86); Venice, Florida, U.S.
- Listed height: 6 ft 1 in (1.85 m)
- Listed weight: 230 lb (104 kg)

Career information
- High school: Garfield (OH)
- College: Ohio
- NFL draft: 1960: 13th round, 152nd overall pick
- AFL draft: 1960

Career history
- Minnesota Vikings (1961); Edmonton Eskimos (1962)

Awards and highlights
- First-team Little All-American (1960)

Career NFL statistics
- Interceptions: 1
- Stats at Pro Football Reference

Emery Richard Grecni (March 27, 1938 – December 8, 2024) was an American former professional football player who was a linebacker with the Minnesota Vikings of the National Football League (NFL). He played college football for the Ohio Bobcats. He was inducted into the Ohio Athletics Hall of Fame in 2012.

Grecni died on December 8, 2025, aged 86.
