= Phil Nugent =

American football player (1939–2019)

No. 15
- Position: Defensive back

Personal information
- Born: August 16, 1939; Lafayette, Louisiana, U.S.
- Died: November 26, 2019 (aged 80); Houston, Texas, U.S.
- Listed height: 6 ft 2 in (1.88 m)
- Listed weight: 195 lb (88 kg)

Career information
- High school: Lafayette (LA)
- College: Tulane
- NFL draft: 1961: 3rd round, 40th overall pick
- AFL draft: 1961: 9th round, 65th overall pick

Career history
- Denver Broncos (1961)

Career AFL statistics
- Interceptions: 7
- Stats at Pro Football Reference

Phil Harper Nugent (August 16, 1939 – November 26, 2019) was an American professional football defensive back. He played for the Denver Broncos of the American Football League (AFL) during the 1961 AFL season.

Nugent played quarterback at Tulane. He died on November 26, 2019.
