= Bob McLeod (American football) =

American football player (1938–2019)

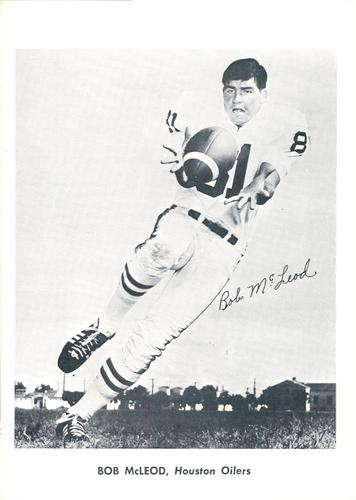

No. 81
- Position: Tight end

Personal information
- Born: November 10, 1938; Sweetwater, Texas, U.S.
- Died: July 6, 2019 (aged 80); Houston, Texas, U.S.
- Listed height: 6 ft 4 in (1.93 m)
- Listed weight: 240 lb (109 kg)

Career information
- High school: Merkel (Merkel, Texas)
- College: Abilene Christian (1957–1960)
- NFL draft: 1961: 13th round, 173rd overall pick
- AFL draft: 1961: 12th round, 95th overall pick

Career history
- Houston Oilers (1961–1966); Buffalo Bills (1967)*
- * Offseason or practice squad member only

Awards and highlights
- AFL champion (1961); AFL All-Star (1961)

Career AFL statistics
- Receptions: 126
- Receiving yards: 1,926
- Touchdowns: 19
- Stats at Pro Football Reference

Robert Don McLeod (November 10, 1938 – July 6, 2019) was an American professional football player who was a tight end for the Houston Oilers of the American Football League (AFL). At 6'5", 232 lbs., he played college football for the Abilene Christian Wildcats and was selected by the Oilers in the 1961 AFL draft. McLeod played six seasons in professional football, from 1961 to 1966.

== AFL career statistics ==
Legend
	Won the AFL championship
**Bold**	Career high

=== Regular season ===
Year	Team	Games		Receiving				
Year	Team	GP	GS	Rec	Yds	Avg	Lng	TD
1961	HOU	14	10	14	172	12.3	18	2
1962	HOU	14	14	**33**	**578**	**17.5**	**55**	**6**
1963	HOU	14	14	**33**	530	16.1	38	5
1964	HOU	14	3	8	81	10.1	20	2
1965	HOU	14	2	15	226	15.1	49	1
1966	HOU	14	11	23	339	14.7	41	3
Career		84	54	126	1,926	15.3	55	19

=== Playoffs ===
Year	Team	Games		Receiving				
Year	Team	GP	GS	Rec	Yds	Avg	Lng	TD
1961	HOU	1	0	1	20	**20.0**	20	0
1962	HOU	1	1	**5**	**70**	14.0	**21**	0
Career		2	1	6	90	15.0	21	0
