= Willis Perkins =

American football player (born 1934–1989)

No. 64
- Positions: Guard, Defensive end

Personal information
- Born: February 14, 1934; Columbus, Texas, U.S.
- Died: November 15, 1989 (aged 55); Colorado City, Texas, U.S.
- Listed height: 6 ft 0 in (1.83 m)
- Listed weight: 260 lb (118 kg)

Career information
- College: Texas Southern (1956–1959)

Career history
- Houston Oilers (1961)*; Boston Patriots (1961); Houston Oilers (1962)*; Houston Oilers (1963)
- * Offseason or practice squad member only

Career statistics
- Games played: 5
- Games started: 1
- Stats at Pro Football Reference

Willis LaFran Perkins (February 14, 1934 – November 15, 1989) was an American former professional football guard and defensive end who played in the American Football League (AFL) with the Houston Oilers and Boston Patriots. He played college football for the Texas Southern Tigers.

== Early life ==
Perkins was born on February 14, 1934, in Columbus, Texas. He enlisted into the Air Force and competed in football and the shot put event in track and field. Perkins played as a fullback for the Ellington Air Force Flyers.

== College career ==
Perkins played college football for the Texas Southern Tigers from 1956 to 1959. On November 19, 1959 he was dismissed from the football team.

== Professional career ==
In 1961, Perkins signed with the Houston Oilers of American Football League (AFL) as an undrafted free agent. He played in one game for the team before he was released by the team.

On September 23, 1961, Perkins signed with the Boston Patriots. He played and started in one game at guard before he was released by the team.

In 1962, Perkins signed with the Oilers but was released on August 28. He returned to the team the following off-season but was released on August 26, 1963. Perkins was again signed by the Oilers during the season and played in three games at defensive end before his season end with torn cartilage.
