= Bob Soltis =

American football player (1936–2009)

No. 42
- Position: Defensive back

Personal information
- Born: April 1, 1936; Minneapolis, Minnesota
- Died: June 26, 2009 (aged 73); Chanhassen, Minnesota
- Listed height: 6 ft 2 in (1.88 m)
- Listed weight: 205 lb (93 kg)

Career information
- High school: Minneapolis (MN) North
- College: Minnesota
- NFL draft: 1959: 16th round, 190th overall pick

Career history
- Boston Patriots (1960–1961)
- Stats at Pro Football Reference

Bob Soltis (April 1, 1936 – June 26, 2009) was an American football defensive back. He played for the Boston Patriots from 1960 to 1961.

He died on June 26, 2009, in Chanhassen, Minnesota at age 73.
