= Jim McMillin =

American football player (1937–2023)

No. 45
- Position: Defensive back

Personal information
- Born: September 18, 1937; Bound Brook, New Jersey, U.S.
- Died: February 4, 2023 (aged 85)
- Listed height: 6 ft 0 in (1.83 m)
- Listed weight: 190 lb (86 kg)

Career information
- High school: Pleasant Hill (CA)
- College: Colorado State
- NFL draft: 1961: undrafted

Career history
- Denver Broncos (1961–1962); Oakland Raiders (1963–1964); Denver Broncos (1964–1965)

Career NFL statistics
- Games played: 62
- Interceptions: 14
- Touchdowns: 2
- Stats at Pro Football Reference

James Robert McMillin (September 18, 1937 – February 4, 2023) was an American professional football player who played as a defensive back in the American Football League (AFL) for the Denver Broncos and Oakland Raiders. He played college football for the Colorado State Rams.

McMillin died at the age of 85 and was survived by his wife Phyllis.
