= Bob Mischak =

American football player (1932–2014)

No. 62, 67, 87
- Positions: Guard, tight end

Personal information
- Born: October 25, 1932; Newark, New Jersey, U.S.
- Died: June 26, 2014 (aged 81); Orinda, California, U.S.
- Listed height: 6 ft 0 in (1.83 m)
- Listed weight: 255 lb (116 kg)

Career information
- High school: Union (NJ)
- College: Army
- NFL draft: 1954: 23rd round, 276th overall pick

Career history

Playing
- New York Giants (1958); New York Titans (1960–1962); Oakland Raiders (1963–1965)

Coaching
- Army "B Squad" (1956) Offense; Army (1966–1972) Offensive line; Oakland Raiders (1973–1981) Tight ends/player Personnel; Los Angeles Raiders (1982–1987) Tight ends/strength & conditioning; Los Angeles Cobras (1988) Offensive line; Maryland Commandos (1989) Offensive line; Munich Falcons (1990) Head coach; Atlanta Falcons (1991) Player Personnel; London Monarchs (1992) Defensive backs/offensive line; Los Angeles Raiders (1994) Tight ends; Ravenna Chiefs (1995) Head coach; London Monarchs (1996) Defensive backs/offensive line

Awards and highlights
- 3× Super Bowl champion (XI, XV, XVIII); 2× Pro Bowl (1961-1962); 2× All-AFL (1960, 1961); 2× AFL All-Star (1961, 1962)

Career NFL/AFL statistics
- Games played: 86
- Games started: 64
- Receptions: 3
- Receiving yards: 52
- Stats at Pro Football Reference

Robert Michael Mischak (Pronounced: MIH-shak) (October 25, 1932 – June 26, 2014) was a college and professional American football guard and tight end who played six seasons in the American Football League (AFL), from 1960 to 1965. He was selected by his peers as a Sporting News AFL All-League guard in 1960 and 1961. He was an AFL Eastern Division All-Star in 1962. He also played in the National Football League (NFL) for the New York Giants and was a starting guard in the famed 1958 "Greatest Game Ever Played". In addition, Mischak was a 3-time Super Bowl champion coach with the Oakland/Los Angeles Raiders.

In an October 1953 game against Duke at the Polo Grounds in New York City, Mischak made an improbable play to seal a 14–13 Army victory that was chronicled in David Maraniss' biography of Vince Lombardi, When Pride Still Mattered. Late in the fourth quarter, Duke running back Red Smith ran a double reverse for what would have been a go-ahead touchdown, but was pursued by Mischak from 73 yards behind. As Smith neared the endzone, Mischak caught up to him and made a touchdown-saving tackle short of the goal line. Two subsequent stops by the Army defense yielded a historic victory for head coach Red Blaik. Col Blaik was later to write “In somehow catching and collaring (Smith), Mischak displayed heart and a pursuit that for one single play I have never seen matched."

In 2017, Mischak was posthumously enshrined into the Army/West Point Sports Hall of Fame, and was named no. 7 on NFL.com's list of Top Ten All Time NFL Players from service academies.

After his playing career Mischak served as a coach of tight ends for the Oakland/Los Angeles Raiders from 1973 to 1987 and 1994. He died on June 26, 2014, at the age of 81.

== See also ==
- List of American Football League players
