= Don Fuell =

American football player (1938–2024)

Profile
- Position: Quarterback

Personal information
- Born: November 26, 1938; Grant, Alabama, U.S.
- Died: November 20, 2024 (aged 85); Clermont, Florida, U.S.

Career information
- High school: Guntersville
- College: Southern Miss (1960)

Awards and highlights
- USM Hall of Fame

Donald Lee Fuell (November 26, 1938 – November 20, 2024) was an American player of gridiron football. He was born in Marshall County, Alabama, and played college football for the University of Southern Mississippi from 1959 to 1961. He then played professional football at the quarterback and defensive back positions in the Canadian Football League (CFL) for the Toronto Argonauts from 1963 to 1965. He also played for the Orlando Panthers of the Atlantic Coast Football League during the 1966 and 1967 seasons. He was inducted into the Southern Miss Sports Hall of Fame in 1983. Fuell died on November 20, 2024, at the age of 85.
