= John Cash (American football) =

American football player (1934–2023)

Profile
- Position: Defensive end

Personal information
- Born: August 5, 1934; Brunswick, Georgia, U.S.
- Died: April 27, 2023 (aged 88)
- Listed height: 6 ft 3 in (1.91 m)
- Listed weight: 240 lb (109 kg)

Career information
- High school: Risley (GA)
- College: Allen

Career history
- Denver Broncos (1961–1962)
- Stats at Pro Football Reference

John Lewis Cash Sr. (August 5, 1934 – April 27, 2023) was an American football player who played for Denver Broncos of the American Football League (AFL). Cash died on April 27, 2023, at the age of 88.
