= John White (tight end) =

American gridiron football player (1935–1988)

No. 86, 73
- Position: Tight end

Personal information
- Born: October 9, 1935; Tampa, Florida, U.S.
- Died: October 14, 1988 (aged 53)
- Listed height: 6 ft 5 in (1.96 m)
- Listed weight: 230 lb (104 kg)

Career information
- College: Texas Southern

Career history
- Houston Oilers (1960–1961); Oakland Raiders (1962); Edmonton Eskimos (1963)

Awards and highlights
- 2× AFL champion (1960, 1961)
- Stats at Pro Football Reference

John L. White (October 9, 1935 – October 14, 1988) was an American football tight end who played three seasons in the American Football League (AFL) with the Houston Oilers and Oakland Raiders. He played college football at Texas Southern University. He was also a member of the Edmonton Eskimos of the Canadian Football League (CFL).

== Professional career ==
White played in eighteen games for the Houston Oilers from 1960 to 1961. He played in seven games for the Oakland Raiders during the 1962 season.

White played in two games as an offensive end for the Edmonton Eskimos in 1963. In his final playing season, the team went 2–14.

== Personal life ==
John White married Otho Raye Haynes (1959). He had two children, Shawnna White and Shametria White.

After his retirement from football, White served as a community activist in Houston's African-American Third Ward, founding Project PULL (Professionals United Leadership League) in a warehouse on McGowen street with his teammate Ernie Ladd. The PULL program provided opportunities to kids up to seventeen years of age, including sports, crafts, field trips, snacks, rap sessions and tutoring.

White died on October 14, 1988, at the age of 53.
