= Leroy Moore (American football player) =

American football player (1935–2022)

Profile
- Position: Defensive end

Personal information
- Born: September 16, 1935; Pontiac, Michigan
- Died: June 19, 2022 (aged 86)
- Listed height: 6 ft 2 in (1.88 m)
- Listed weight: 240 lb (109 kg)

Career information
- High school: Pontiac Central
- College: Fort Valley State

Career history
- Boston Patriots (1961–1962); Buffalo Bills (1960, 1962–1963); Denver Broncos (1964–1965)
- Stats at Pro Football Reference

Leroy Franklin Moore (September 16, 1935 – June 19, 2022) was an American football player who played with the Boston Patriots, Buffalo Bills and Denver Broncos. He played college football at Fort Valley State University.

Father of Krip Hop nation founder and poet, Leroy F. Moore Jr.

Moore died on June 19, 2022, at the age of 86.
