= Paul Hynes =

American football player (born 1968)

- Hynes, circa 1963

No. 40, 33
- Position: Cornerback

Personal information
- Born: September 9, 1939; Sulphur, Louisiana, U.S.
- Died: August 22, 2013 (aged 73); Houston, Texas, U.S.
- Listed height: 6 ft 1 in (1.85 m)
- Listed weight: 210 lb (95 kg)

Career information
- High school: Sulphur
- College: Louisiana Tech
- AFL draft: 1961: 12th round, 94th overall pick

Career history
- Dallas Texans (1961); New York Titans (1961–1962)
- Stats at Pro Football Reference

Paul Edwin Hynes (September 9, 1939 – August 22, 2013) was an American professional football cornerback who played in the American Football League (AFL) with the Dallas Texans and New York Titans. He played college football for the Louisiana Tech Bulldogs and was selected by the Texans in the 12th round of the 1961 AFL draft.

== Early life ==
Paul Edwin Hynes was born on September 9, 1939, in Sulphur, Louisiana. He played high school football at Sulphur High School and graduated in 1957.

== College career ==
Hynes enrolled at Louisiana Polytechnic Institute to play college football for the Louisiana Tech Bulldogs. He was a four-year letterman from 1957 to 1960. He earned All-Gulf States Conference (GSC) honors at fullback in 1958 and 1960. He led the GSC in scoring as a senior in 1960 with 36 points. Hynes tied A. L. Williams' school record with 23 career rushing touchdowns. Hynes was named to Louisiana Tech's All-Century team in 2001.

== Professional career ==
Hynes was selected by the Dallas Texans in the 12th round, with the 94th overall pick, of the 1961 AFL draft and by the San Francisco 49ers in the 10th round, with the 136th overall pick, of the 1961 NFL draft. He signed with the Texans on January 7, 1961, as a defensive back. He played in one regular season game for the Texans before being released in September. Hynes was listed as a cornerback.

On September 28, 1961, it was reported that Hynes had been signed by the New York Titans. He was officially added to the active roster on October 17. He appeared in nine games, starting three, for the Titans during the 1961 season. Hynes played in 13 games, starting 12, for New York in 1962 and recorded two interceptions for two yards. He was released on August 14, 1963.

== Personal life ==
Hynes worked as an offshore pipeline engineer in the North Sea and Persian Gulf. He also started his own consulting companies, working in the North Sea and Southeast Asia. He later lived in Weatherford, Texas. Hynes died on August 22, 2013, in Houston, Texas of multiple myeloma.
