= Don Floyd =

American football player (1938–1980)

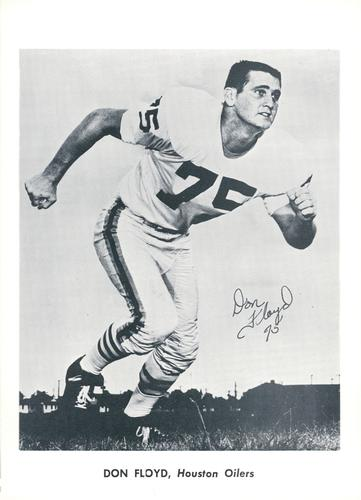

No. 75
- Position: Defensive end

Personal information
- Born: July 10, 1938; Abilene, Texas, U.S.
- Died: March 9, 1980 (aged 41); Raymondville, Texas, U.S.
- Listed height: 6 ft 3 in (1.91 m)
- Listed weight: 245 lb (111 kg)

Career information
- High school: Midlothian (Midlothian, Texas)
- College: TCU
- NFL draft: 1960: 2nd round, 23rd overall pick
- AFL draft: 1960: 2nd round

Career history

Playing
- Houston Oilers (1960-1967); West Texas Rufneks (1969)

Coaching
- West Texas Rufneks (1969) Assistant coach

Awards and highlights
- 2× AFL champion (1960, 1961); 2× First-team All-AFL (1961, 1962); 2× AFL All-Star (1961, 1962); Houston Oilers All-Time Team; Consensus All-American (1959); First-team All-American (1958); 2× First-team All-SWC (1958, 1959)

Career AFL statistics
- Sacks: 20.5
- Interceptions: 4
- Touchdowns: 2
- Stats at Pro Football Reference

Donald Wayne Floyd (July 1, 1938 – March 9, 1980) was an American professional football player who was a defensive end for the Houston Oilers of the American Football League (AFL). He played college football for the TCU Horned Frogs.

== Early life ==
Born in Abilene, Texas, Floyd played his high school football in Midlothian, Texas, for the Midlothian Panthers. Midlothian named a stadium in his honor, but built a new one. Until 2018, Don Floyd stadium was used primarily as a practice field, which brought much criticism from Midlothian citizens. The road which runs next to the new Midlothian stadium is named in his honor. Also, in 2018, the field at MISD Multipurpose Stadium was named for him.

Floyd earned All America honors at Texas Christian University (TCU), played on offense and defense, and helped TCU to two conference championships and two bowl appearances.

== Professional career ==
After being a draft choice of both the Baltimore Colts of the National Football League (NFL) and the Houston Oilers of the AFL in 1960, Floyd signed with Houston in the fledgling AFL. He was selected as a defensive end on the American Football League All-League team in 1961 and 1962, and an AFL Eastern Division All-Star in 1963. In the early 1960s, Floyd was among the best, using a combination of strength and speed to establish a presence to be accounted for by the opposition on every play.

He played in four American Football League Championships, helping the Oilers win the league's first two titles in 1960 and 1961. Don Floyd is on the Oilers' All-Time Team.

== Death ==
On March 9, 1980, while traveling with a friend through Raymondville on his way to Houston, Floyd began to experience chest pain. Floyd's friend took him to Willacy County Hospital in Raymondville, where a nurse instructed the pair to drive to a hospital in Harlingen, 30 miles away. On the drive toward Harlingen, Floyd died of a heart attack. Surviving family members, including three former wives, sued the on-duty physician, the emergency room nurse and the hospital in Raymondville.

Subsequent investigation determined that the nurse at Willacy County Hospital had been told to send all patients to the Harlingen hospital except in true life-and-death emergencies. The nursing board disciplinary hearing against the nurse and subsequent legal challenges to it (Lunsford v. Board of Nurse Examiners) established that nurses have a nurse-patient relationship and a duty to act when a patient comes to an emergency room, even if the patient has never been seen by the hospital or one of its physicians.

== See also ==
- List of American Football League players
