= Tony Banfield =

American football player (born 1938)

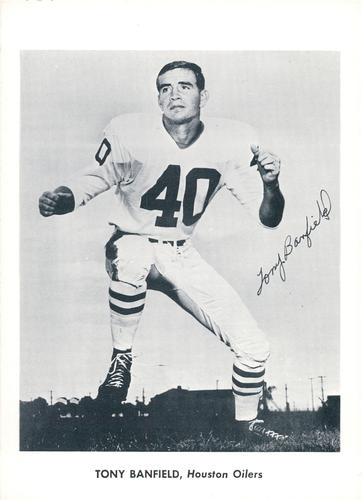

No. 40
- Position: Defensive back

Personal information
- Born: December 18, 1938 (age 87); Independence, Kansas, U.S.
- Listed height: 6 ft 1 in (1.85 m)
- Listed weight: 185 lb (84 kg)

Career information
- High school: Broken Arrow (Broken Arrow, Oklahoma)
- College: Oklahoma State
- NFL draft: 1960: undrafted

Career history
- Houston Oilers (1960–1963, 1965)

Awards and highlights
- 2× AFL champion (1960, 1961); 2× TSN All-AFL (1961, 1962); 3× AFL All-Star (1961, 1962, 1963)
- Stats at Pro Football Reference

Tony Banfield (December 18, 1938) is an American former professional football player who was a defensive back for the Houston Oilers of the American Football League (AFL). He played college football for the Oklahoma State Cowboys. He played for Houston in the AFL from 1960 through 1963 and in 1965. In 1962, he returned a blocked punt 58 yards for a touchdown in the Oilers' 32–17 defeat of the Oakland Raiders. He was All-AFL in 1961 and 1962 and an American Football League Eastern Division All-Star in 1963. Banfield played in the first three AFL Championship games, winning the title in 1960 and 1961.

== See also ==
- List of American Football League players
