= Luther Jeralds =

American gridiron football player (1938–1992)

No. 89
- Position: Defensive end

Personal information
- Born: August 20, 1938; Orrum, North Carolina
- Died: December 13, 1992 (aged 54); Fayetteville, North Carolina
- Listed height: 6 ft 3 in (1.91 m)
- Listed weight: 235 lb (107 kg)

Career information
- High school: Fayetteville (NC) E. E. Smith
- College: North Carolina Central

Career history
- Dallas Texans (1961); Edmonton Eskimos (1963)
- Stats at Pro Football Reference

Luther Jeralds (August 20, 1938 – December 13, 1992) was an American football defensive end. He played in nine games for the Dallas Texans in 1961 and later for the Edmonton Eskimos in 1963.
