= Bill Cooper (American football) =

American football player (born 1939)

No. 34, 35
- Positions: Fullback, linebacker

Personal information
- Born: July 12, 1939 (age 87); Carrollton, Ohio, U.S.
- Listed height: 6 ft 3 in (1.91 m)
- Listed weight: 215 lb (98 kg)

Career information
- High school: New Philadelphia (New Philadelphia, Ohio)
- College: Muskingum (1957–1960)
- NFL draft: 1961: 3rd round, 37th overall pick
- AFL draft: 1961: 14th round, 105th overall pick

Career history
- San Francisco 49ers (1961–1964)

Awards and highlights
- First-team Little All-American (1960)

Career NFL statistics
- Rushing yards: 15
- Rushing average: 1.5
- Touchdowns: 1
- Stats at Pro Football Reference
- College Football Hall of Fame

Bill Cooper (born July 12, 1939), nicknamed "Cannonball", is an American former professional football player who was a fullback and linebacker for the San Francisco 49ers of the National Football League (NFL). He played college football for the Muskingum Fighting Muskies and was inducted into the College Football Hall of Fame in 2000.
