= Ken Adamson =

American football player (1938–2023)

No. 60
- Position: Offensive guard

Personal information
- Born: October 12, 1938; Phoenix, Arizona, U.S.
- Died: November 14, 2023 (aged 85); California, U.S.
- Listed height: 6 ft 2 in (1.88 m)
- Listed weight: 235 lb (107 kg)

Career information
- High school: Marist (Brookhaven, Georgia)
- College: Notre Dame
- NFL draft: 1960: undrafted

Career history
- Denver Broncos (1960–1962)

Awards and highlights
- AFL All-Star (1961)
- Stats at Pro Football Reference

Kenneth Marshall Adamson (October 12, 1938 – November 14, 2023) was an American professional football player who was a guard for the Denver Broncos of the American Football League (AFL) from 1960 through 1962. He played college football for the Notre Dame Fighting Irish. Playing with Denver, he was an AFL All-Star in 1961. Adamson died on November 14, 2023, at the age of 85.

== See also ==
- List of American Football League players
