= Fred Bukaty =

American football player (1936–2007)

No. 33
- Position: Fullback

Personal information
- Born: February 13, 1936; Kansas City, Missouri
- Died: December 18, 2007 (aged 71); Kansas City, Missouri
- Listed height: 5 ft 11 in (1.80 m)
- Listed weight: 195 lb (88 kg)

Career information
- High school: Kansas City (MO) Bishop Hogan
- College: Kansas

Career history
- Denver Broncos (1961)
- Stats at Pro Football Reference

Fred Bukaty (February 13, 1936 – December 18, 2007) was an American football fullback. He played for the Denver Broncos in 1961.
