= 1961 American Football League season =

American Football League season

1961 AFL season

Regular season
- Duration: September 9 – December 17, 1961

Playoffs
- Date: December 24, 1961
- Eastern champion: Houston Oilers
- Western champion: San Diego Chargers
- Site: Balboa Stadium, San Diego, California
- Champion: Houston Oilers

AFL teams: West, East

The 1961 AFL season was the second regular season of the American Football League. It consisted of 8 franchises split into two divisions: the East Division (Buffalo Bills, Houston Oilers, Titans of New York, Boston Patriots) and the West Division (San Diego Chargers, Denver Broncos, Dallas Texans, Oakland Raiders).

After having spent its inaugural season in Los Angeles, the Chargers moved to San Diego, California for this AFL season; 56 years later, the franchise returned to their original home.

The season ended when the Houston Oilers defeated the San Diego Chargers in the AFL Championship game.

== Division races ==
The AFL had 8 teams, grouped into two divisions. Each team would play a home-and-away game against the other 7 teams in the league for a total of 14 games, and the best team in the Eastern Division would play against the best in the Western Division in a championship game. If there was a tie in the standings at the top of either division, a one-game playoff would be held to determine the division winner.

The San Diego Chargers won their first eleven games, clinching the Western Division on November 12, with four games left. When San Diego reached 10–0, it had twice the wins of any other team in the AFL. In the Eastern Division, the Titans of New York lost 27–10 to Denver, while Boston beat Buffalo 52–21, in Week Seven, for a tie in the race, with the Pats at 3–3–1 and the Titans at 3–3–0. The Titans lost, 48–13 to San Diego, in Week Nine. The following week, though (November 12), Houston beat Boston, 27–15, to take a half-game lead, and won the division by a full game.

Week	Eastern		Western	
1	Tie (Hou, TNY)	1–0–0	Tie (Den, SD)	1–0–0
2	Houston	1–0–0	San Diego	2–0–0
3	Tie (Bos, TNY)	2–1–0	San Diego	3–0–0
4	New York	3–1–0	San Diego	4–0–0
5	New York	3–2–0	San Diego	5–0–0
6	New York	3–3–0	San Diego	6–0–0
7	Tie (Bos, TNY)	3–3–1	San Diego	7–0–0
8	Tie (Bos, TNY)	4–3–1	San Diego	8–0–0
9	Boston	5–3–1	San Diego	9–0–0
10	Houston	5–3–1	San Diego	10–0–0
11	Houston	6–3–1	San Diego	11–0–0
12	Houston	7–3–1	San Diego	11–0–0
13	Houston	8–3–1	San Diego	11–1–0
14	Houston	9–3–1	San Diego	12–1–0
15	Houston	10–3–1	San Diego	12–2–0

== Regular season ==
=== Results ===
Home/Road		Eastern Division				Western Division			
Home/Road		BOS	BUF	HOU	NY	DAL	DEN	OAK	SD
Eastern	Boston Patriots		52–21	31–31	20–21	28–21	45–17	20–17	27–38
Eastern	Buffalo Bills	21–23		16–28	41–31	27–24	10–22	22–31	11–19
Eastern	Houston Oilers	27–15	12–22		49–13	38–7	45–14	55–0	33–13
Eastern	Titans of New York	37–30	21–14	21–48		28–7	35–28	23–12	10–25
Western	Dallas Texans	17–18	20–30	26–21	35–24		49–21	43–11	10–26
Western	Denver Broncos	24–28	10–23	14–55	27–10	12–19		27–24	16–19
Western	Oakland Raiders	21–35	21–26	16–47	6–14	35–42	33–19		10–41
Western	San Diego Chargers	0–41	28–10	34–24	48–13	24–14	37–0	44–0	

=== Standings ===
AFL Eastern Division
	W	L	T	PCT	DIV	PF	PA	STK
Houston Oilers	10	3	1	.769	4–1–1	513	242	W9
Boston Patriots	9	4	1	.692	2–3–1	413	313	W4
New York Titans	7	7	0	.500	3–3	301	390	L2
Buffalo Bills	6	8	0	.429	2–4	294	342	L1

Note: Tie games were not officially counted in the standings in the AFL.

AFL Western Division
	W	L	T	PCT	DIV	PF	PA	STK
San Diego Chargers	12	2	0	.857	6–0	396	219	L1
Dallas Texans	6	8	0	.429	4–2	334	343	W2
Denver Broncos	3	11	0	.214	1–5	251	432	L7
Oakland Raiders	2	12	0	.143	1–5	237	458	L6

== Playoffs ==
AFL Championship Game
December 24, 1961 – Balboa Stadium
Houston Oilers	10
San Diego Chargers	3

== Awards ==
- AP AFL Player of The Year: George Blanda, Houston Oilers
- UPI AFL Player of The Year: George Blanda, Houston Oilers

== Stadium changes ==
- The relocated San Diego Chargers moved from Los Angeles Memorial Coliseum to Balboa Stadium
- The Oakland Raiders continued to play in San Francisco, playing all their home games at Candlestick Park

== Coaching changes ==
Offseason
None

In-season

- Boston Patriots: Lou Saban was fired after five games. Assistant coach Mike Holovak took over the head coaching duties.
- Houston Oilers: Lou Rymkus was fired after five games. Assistant coach Wally Lemm took over the head coaching duties.
- Oakland Raiders: Eddie Erdelatz was fired after two games. Marty Feldman took over.

== See also ==
- 1961 NFL season
