= 1965 All-AFL Team =

List of the best American Football League players of 1965

The 1965 American Football League All-League Team was selected after the 1965 American Football League season by AFL players, the Associated Press (AP), the Newspaper Enterprise Association (NEA), the New York Daily News (NYDN), and United Press International (UPI) to honor the league's top performers at each position.

== Teams ==
Offense
Position	First team	Second team
Quarterback	Jack Kemp, Bills (AFL, AP, NEA, NYDN, UPI)	John Hadl, Chargers (AP, NYDN, UPI); Len Dawson, Chiefs (NEA)
Halfback	Paul Lowe, Chargers (AFL, AP, NEA, NYDN, UPI)	Clem Daniels, Raiders (NEA, UPI); Curtis McClinton, Chiefs (AP); Ode Burrell, Oilers (NYDN)
Fullback	Cookie Gilchrist, Broncos (AFL, AP, NEA, NYDN, UPI)	Matt Snell, Jets (AP, NEA, NYDN); Mack Lee Hill, Chiefs (UPI)
Wide receiver	Lance Alworth, Chargers (AFL, AP, NEA, NYDN, UPI); Lionel Taylor, Broncos (AFL, AP, NEA, NYDN, UPI); Art Powell, Raiders (AFL)	Art Powell, Raiders (AP, NEA, NYDN, UPI); Don Maynard, Jets (AP, NEA, NYDN)
Tight end	Willie Frazier, Oilers (AFL, AP, NEA, NYDN, UPI)	Dave Kocourek, Chargers (AP, NYDN); Fred Arbanas, Chiefs (NEA, UPI)
Tackle	Jim Tyrer, Chiefs (AFL, AP, NEA, NYDN, UPI); Ron Mix, Chargers (AP, NEA, NYDN, UPI); Eldon Danenhauer, Broncos (AFL)	Eldon Danenhauer, Broncos (AP, NEA, NYDN, UPI); Sherman Plunkett, Jets (AP, NEA); Stew Barber, Bills (NYDN, UPI)
Guard	Billy Shaw, Bills (AFL, AP, NEA, NYDN, UPI); Bob Talamini, Oilers (AFL, AP, NYDN, UPI); Wayne Hawkins, Raiders (NEA)	Walt Sweeney, Chargers (AP, NYDN); Wayne Hawkins, Raiders (AP, UPI); Sonny Bishop, Oilers (NEA, NYDN); Bob Talamini, Oilers (NEA); Dan Ficca, Jets (UPI)
Center	Jim Otto, Raiders (AFL, AP, NEA, NYDN, UPI)	Jon Morris, Patriots (AP, NEA, UPI); Mike Hudock, Jets (NYDN)

Special teams
Position	First team	Second team
Kicker	Pete Gogolak, Bills (AFL)	N/A
Punter	Curley Johnson, Jets (AFL)	N/A

Defense
Position	First team	Second team
Defensive end	Earl Faison, Chargers (AFL, AP, NEA, NYDN, UPI); Jerry Mays, Chiefs (AFL, AP, NEA, NYDN); Ron McDole, Bills (UPI)	Tom Day, Bills (AP, NEA, NYDN); Ben Davidson, Raiders (AP, NEA, UPI); Verlon Biggs, Jets (NYDN); Jerry Mays, Chiefs (UPI)
Defensive tackle	Ernie Ladd, Chargers (AFL, AP, NEA, NYDN, UPI); Tom Sestak, Bills (AFL, AP, NEA, NYDN, UPI)	Buck Buchanan, Chiefs (AP, NEA, NYDN, UPI); Ray Jacobs, Broncos (AP, NEA); Jim Dunaway, Bills (NYDN, UPI)
Middle linebacker	Nick Buoniconti, Boston (AFL, AP, NEA, NYDN, UPI)	Harry Jacobs, Bills (NEA)
Outside linebacker	Bobby Bell, Chiefs (AFL, AP, NEA, NYDN, UPI); Mike Stratton, Bills (AFL, AP, NEA, NYDN, UPI)	Larry Grantham, Jets (AP, NEA, NYDN, UPI); Frank Buncom, Chargers (AP, NEA); John Tracey, Bills (AP, NYDN); John Bramlett, Broncos (NYDN, UPI); E. J. Holub, Chiefs (UPI)
Cornerback	Dave Grayson, Raiders (AFL, AP, NEA, NYDN, UPI); Butch Byrd, Bills (AFL, AP, NYDN); Speedy Duncan, Chargers (NEA); Fred Williamson, Chiefs (UPI)	W. K. Hicks, Oilers (AP, NEA, NYDN, UPI); Butch Byrd, Bills (NEA, UPI); Speedy Duncan, Chargers (AP); Willie Brown, Broncos (NYDN); Willie Mitchell, Chiefs (NYDN)
Safety	George Saimes, Bills (AFL, AP, NEA, NYDN, UPI); Johnny Robinson, Chiefs (AFL, AP); Dainard Paulson, Jets (NEA, NYDN, UPI)	Kenny Graham, Chargers (AP, NEA, UPI); Johnny Robinson, Chiefs (NEA, NYDN, UPI); Dainard Paulson, Jets (AP)
