= 1965 San Diego Chargers season =

NFL team season

- Owner: Barron Hilton
- General manager: Sid Gillman
- Head coach: Sid Gillman
- Home stadium: Balboa Stadium

Results
- Record: 9–2–3
- Division place: 1st Western Division
- Playoffs: Lost AFL Championship (vs. Bills) 0–23
- All-AFL: 11: FL Lance Alworth (1st team); LB Frank Buncom (2nd team); CB/KR Speedy Duncan (2nd team); DE Earl Faison (1st team); S Kenny Graham (2nd team); QB John Hadl (2nd team); TE Dave Kocourek (2nd team); DT Ernie Ladd (1st team); RB Paul Lowe (1st team); T Ron Mix (1st team); G Walt Sweeney (2nd team)
- AFL All-Stars: 12: FL Lance Alworth; LB Frank Buncom; CB/KR Speedy Duncan; DE Earl Faison; S Kenny Graham; QB John Hadl; DT Ernie Ladd; RB Keith Lincoln; RB Paul Lowe; T Ron Mix; G Walt Sweeney; T Ernie Wright

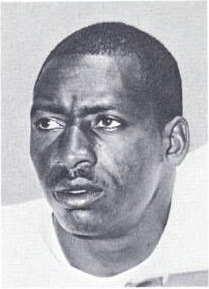
Paul Lowe broke league and franchise records with 1,121 rushing yards in 1965.

The 1965 San Diego Chargers season was their sixth as a professional AFL franchise; the team improved on their 8–5–1 record in 1964. Head Coach Sid Gillman led the Chargers to their fifth AFL West title with a 9–2–3 record, before losing the AFL Championship Game to the Buffalo Bills for the second consecutive season. It would prove to be the Chargers' last post-season appearance until 1979.

San Diego took the lead in the AFL Western division early in the season, as they won five of their first seven games and tied the other two. They maintained first place despite two midseason defeats and finished with three wins in a row, clinching their division with a game to spare. During the regular season, they led the league in several key statistical categories, ranking first for rushing and passing yardage on both offense and defense. They entered the AFL Championship game as 6 1/2 point favorites on their own home field, but were shut out by the Bills 23–0.

Several individual Chargers had strong seasons, with the offense featuring the top passer, runner and receiver, ranked by yardage. Quarterback John Hadl, in his first season as the full time starter, threw for 2,798 yards, running back Paul Lowe set both team and league records with 1,121 yards while leading the league with 5 yards per carry, and flanker Lance Alworth's 1,602 receiving yards and 14 touchdowns are yet to be surpassed as Charger records. The defense featured strong performances by safety Bud Whitehead, cornerback Speedy Duncan (also the AFL's leading punt returner), and defensive linemen Earl Faison and Ernie Ladd. The latter two players fell out with Gillman, and declared their intention to leave at the end of the season.

== Offseason ==
=== AFL draft ===
==== Regular draft ====
The 1965 AFL draft took place on November 28, 1964, late in the previous season. The rival National Football League (NFL) conducted its draft on the same day. Where the same player was drafted by both AFL and NFL franchises, the two would compete to sign him. The Chargers were able to sign their 1st-round pick, defensive lineman Steve DeLong, who had also been drafted by the Chicago Bears. DeLong stated that he preferred the city of San Diego, and that the Chargers had made him a better offer. While DeLong was used as a backup during his rookie season, he went on to start in 75 games during seven seasons in San Diego, making one AFL All-Star game. Other successful signings included linebacker Rick Redman, who started 81 games over nine years in San Diego and made one All-Star game, and running back Gene Foster, who scored twice in 1965 and gained over 2,500 yards during a six-year career with the Chargers.

Other Charger draftees opted to sign with NFL clubs, including 2nd-round pick Roy Jefferson, who joined the Pittsburgh Steelers. (Note: Jefferson went on to earn three Pro Bowl appearances, two Associated Press All-Pro nominations (once on the 1st team, once on the 2nd team), and a Super Bowl ring with the 1970 Baltimore Colts.) In total, five of the Chargers' selections chose the NFL, including four of their top eight picks, while five signed with San Diego.

1965 San Diego Chargers draft
Round	Pick	Player	Position	College	Notes
1	6	Steve DeLong *	Defensive end	Tennessee	6th pick in NFL draft
2	14	Roy Jefferson *	Wide receiver	Utah	18th pick in NFL draft; signed by Pittsburgh Steelers
3	22	Allen Brown	Tight end	Mississippi	38th pick in NFL draft; signed by Green Bay Packers
4	30	Steve Tensi	Quarterback	Florida State	224th pick in NFL draft
5	38	Rick Redman *	Linebacker	Washington	132nd pick in NFL draft
6	46	Will Beasley	Fullback	North Carolina A&T	Signed by 1966 Brooklyn Dodgers (COFL)
7	54	Jack Snow *	Wide receiver	Notre Dame	8th pick in NFL draft; signed by Los Angeles Rams
8	62	Clancy Williams	Defensive back	Washington State	9th pick in NFL draft; signed by Los Angeles Rams
9	70	Jerry Whelchel	Quarterback	Massachusetts	Signed by Holyoke Bombers (ACFL)
10	78	Gene Foster	Running back	Arizona State	201st pick in NFL draft
11	86	Veran Smith	Guard	Utah State	232nd pick in NFL draft
12	94	Jim Allison	Running back	San Diego State	
13	102	Bill Quigley	Linebacker	Villanova	162nd pick in NFL draft
14	110	Don Floyd	End	Florida State	Signed by Norfolk Neptunes (COFL)
15	118	Mike Howell	Defensive back	Grambling State	111th pick in NFL draft; signed by Cleveland Browns
16	126	John Godden	Linebacker	San Diego State	Signed by 1966 Hartford Charter Oaks (COFL)
17	134	Leon Hardy	Tackle	Texas Southern	
18	142	Bob Evans	Defensive end	Texas A&M	Signed by Houston Oilers
19	150	Braden Beck	Kicker	Stanford	Signed by 1971 Houston Oilers
20	158	Jack Edwards	Center	Florida State	Signed by Norfolk Neptunes (COFL)
Made roster * Made at least one AFL All-Star game or NFL Pro Bowl during career Played in the NFL in 1965

==== Redshirt draft ====
As well as their regular collegiate draft, the AFL also held a separate redshirt draft. This covered players whose graduation had been delayed by taking a redshirt year, meaning that they still had a further year of college football eligibility. With their first pick in this draft, the Chargers chose San Diego State Aztecs wide receiver Gary Garrison. They eventually signed him on December 5, 1965, after outbidding the NFL's San Francisco 49ers. Garrison went on to spend eleven seasons with the Chargers, accumulating over 7,500 receiving yards while being nominated to one AFL All-Star game and three Pro Bowls. He was also inducted into the Chargers Hall of Fame in 1985.

Unless noted otherwise, these players began their professional careers in 1966.

1965 San Diego Chargers redshirt draft
Round	Pick	Player	Position	College	Notes
1	6	Gary Garrison *	Wide receiver	San Diego State	77th pick in NFL draft
2	14	Larry Martin	Defensive tackle	San Diego State	195th pick in NFL draft
3	22	Stan Dzura	Tackle	California	106th pick in NFL draft
4	30	Doug Woodlief	Linebacker	Memphis	65th pick in NFL draft; signed by 1965 Los Angeles Rams
5	38	Jim Weatherwax	Defensive tackle	Los Angeles State	150th pick in NFL draft; signed by Green Bay Packers
6	46	Tom Good	Linebacker	Marshall	211th pick in NFL draft
7	54	Wayne Waff	End	East Tennessee State	
8	62	Roy Shivers	Running back	Utah State	264th pick in NFL draft; signed by St. Louis Cardinals
9	70	Tony Carey	Halfback	Notre Dame	73rd pick in NFL draft
10	78	Dave Plump	Defensive back	Fresno State	156th pick in NFL draft
11	86	Jeff White	End	Texas Tech	248th pick in NFL draft; signed by 1967 Orange County Ramblers (COFL)
12	94	Mike Ciccolella	Linebacker	Dayton	239th pick in NFL draft; signed by New York Giants
Made roster * Made at least one AFL All-Star game or NFL Pro Bowl during career Played in the NFL in 1966

=== Departures and arrivals ===
Quarterback Tobin Rote, who had started for the Chargers in the past two AFL championship games, retired after the 1964 season. (Note: Rote later came out of retirement for a brief spell with the Denver Broncos.) John Hadl took over as the starter, having split time with Rote the previous year. There was also a change on the offensive line. Don Rogers had started every game at center over the past two seasons, and featured in all but two Charger games over the first five years of the franchise. He lost his starting job to Sam Gruneisen during the offseason, and did not play professionally again. Defensive lineman Hank Schmidt, who had featured in every game for San Diego over the previous four seasons, switched to the Buffalo Bills midseason and beat the Chargers with his new team in the AFL title game at season's end. New players included Dick Degen, an undrafted rookie who missed time through injury but still started seven games, specialist kicker Herb Travenio, who had briefly featured for the Chargers in 1964 before being dropped and working for the postal service, and safety Bob Zeman, back for a second stint with the team after starting 23 games from 1960 to 1961; he would start 7 more from 1965 to 1966.

=== San Diego stadium vote ===
The future of the Chargers franchise was uncertain entering the 1965 season, with owner Barron Hilton indicating that he would choose to move his team to another venue unless the city of San Diego approved a new stadium. Press speculation named Anaheim as a possible alternative for the team, as well as Dodger Stadium in Los Angeles. On November 2, over 130,000 citizens of San Diego voted by a majority of roughly 72% to 28% to allocated $27 million for the construction of a 50,000-seat stadium in Mission Valley. Hilton signed a 10-year lease, beginning in 1967. Jack Murphy, sports editor of the San Diego Union, was credited with getting the stadium project approved.

Initially known as San Diego Stadium, (Note: Other names included Jack Murphy Stadium, Qualcomm Stadium and SDCCU Stadium.) this would be the Chargers' home until their return to Los Angeles in 2017.

== Personnel ==
=== Staff ===
1965 San Diego Chargers staff
Front office: Owner – Barron Hilton; General manager – Sid Gillman; Publicity director - Jerry Wynn; Business manager - John Gough; Head coaches: Head coach – Sid Gillman; Offensive coaches: Offensive backfield coach – Tom Bass; Offensive line coach – Joe Madro	Defensive coaches: Defensive line coach – Walt Hackett; Defensive backfield coach – Chuck Noll; Strength and conditioning: Strength coach - Alvin Roy

=== Roster ===
1965 San Diego Chargers roster
Quarterbacks (QB): 15 Don Breaux; 21 John Hadl P; Running backs (RB): 22 Keith Lincoln; 23 Paul Lowe; 32 Jim Allison; 37 Gene Foster; Wide receivers (WR): 19 Lance Alworth; 20 Miller Farr; 88 Don Norton; Tight ends (TE): 38 Jacque MacKinnon; 83 Dave Kocourek	Offensive linemen (OL): 60 Ed Mitchell G; 61 Ernie Park T/G; 62 John Farris G; 65 Sam Gruneisen C; 72 Gary Kirner T/C; 74 Ron Mix T; 75 Ernie Wright T; 78 Walt Sweeney G; Defensive linemen (DL): 56 Steve DeLong DE/DT; 71 Fred Moore DT/DE; 77 Ernie Ladd DT; 79 George Gross DT; 85 Bob Petrich DE; 86 Earl Faison DE; 87 Howard Kindig DE	Linebackers (LB): 30 Bob Horton OLB; 50 Chuck Allen MLB; 51 Dick Degen OLB; 55 Frank Buncom OLB; 89 Ron Carpenter MLB; Defensive backs (DB): 25 Dick Westmoreland CB; 33 Kenny Graham SS; 34 Bob Zeman FS; 36 Dick Harris SS; 45 Speedy Duncan CB; 47 Bud Whitehead FS; 49 Jimmy Warren CB; Special teams (ST): 35 Herb Travenio K	Practice squad: 13 Steve Tensi QB; 39 Dick Van Raaphorst K; 81 Sammie Taylor WR; Reserve: 24 Jack Jacobson S (IR); 41 Nat Whitmyer CB/S (IR); 64 Pat Shea G (IR); 66 Rick Redman (IR) LB/P; Rookies in italics

== Preseason ==
San Diego lost their exhibition opener despite outgaining the Raiders by 293 yards to 116. An interception thrown by Hadl was run back 42 yards for a touchdown, and rookie kicker Les Murdock made only one of three field goal attempts. Hadl improved in the second game, running for one touchdown against the Chiefs and throwing another to Jacque MacKinnon. Rookies Foster (with a run) and DeLong (on a fumble return) also scored. Three 3rd-quarter touchdowns were enough to beat Denver in the next game: running back Keith Lincoln threw a 62-yard touchdown pass to Lance Alworth on a trick play, and Hadl and Dave Kocourek combined for two more.

The last two Chargers exhibition games were played in neutral venues. They faced the Raiders again in Portland, Oregon, scoring 37 unanswered points after facing a 10–3 deficit in the first half. MacKinnon, Hadl and Alworth all scored again, and the defense contributed with a safety from Earl Faison and a fumble return touchdown for Jimmy Warren. Finally, they lost in Little Rock, Arkansas to a George Blanda field goal with 8 seconds to play. Rookie Jim Allison scored the lone San Diego touchdown on a 12-yard reception from Hadl.

Week	Date	Opponent	Result	Record	Venue	Attendance
1	August 7	Oakland Raiders	L 3–10	0–1	Balboa Stadium	27,168
2	August 15	at Kansas City Chiefs	W 31–10	1–1	Municipal Stadium	13,132
3	August 21	at Denver Broncos	W 21–6	2–1	Bears Stadium	18,913
4	August 28	vs. Oakland Raiders	W 46–17	3–1	Multnomah Stadium, (Portland)	15,234
5	September 4	vs. Houston Oilers	L 10–13	3–2	War Memorial Stadium, (Little Rock)	17,000

== Regular season ==
=== Summary ===
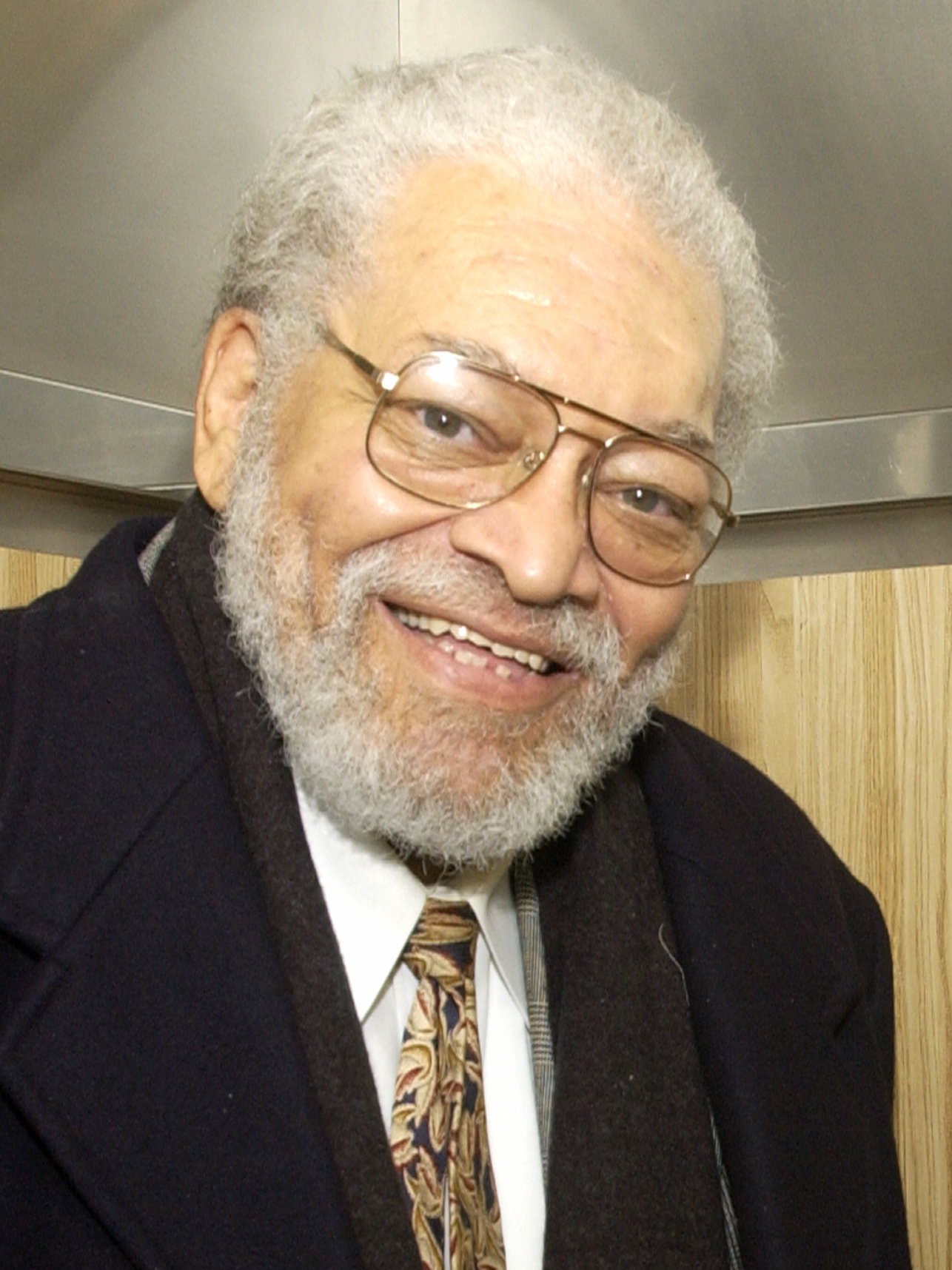
Defensive tackle Ernie Ladd (pictured in 2004) was named both an AFL All-Star and 1st-team All-AFL in 1965, his last year with the Chargers.

San Diego were unbeaten over the first half of the season, with five wins and two ties. This included an easy victory at Buffalo, who had beaten them in the previous season's AFL Championship Game. They lost two of their next three games, but maintained first place in the AFL West. After tying the return match with Buffalo, they won their final three games, clinching their division with a game to spare and setting up a rematch with the Bills.

The Chargers' offense led the league in points scored, total yards gained, passing yards, rushing yards and first downs gained. Hadl started every game, completing exactly half of his passes while accumulating 2,798 yards, with 20 touchdowns and 21 interceptions. His passer rating of 71.3 was down on the previous season, but still the second best in the AFL, behind only Len Dawson of the Kansas City Chiefs. He led the league in passing yardage, yards per attempt (8.0) and yards per completion (16.1); the latter two statistics would stand as career highs. His most prolific receiver was Alworth, who accounted for nearly half the team's receiving yards and over half the receiving touchdowns. He ranked second in the league with 69 receptions, joint first with 14 touchdown catches, and top with 1,602 receiving yards, 384 clear of any other player. As of 2023, Alworth still holds the franchise record for receiving yards in a season, despite playing in only a 14-game season; his touchdown tally was tied by Tony Martin in 1995, but has yet to be surpassed by any Charger. San Diego's second-ranked receiver Don Norton added 485 yards. With his fellow running back Lincoln struggling with injuries throughout the season, Paul Lowe had a career-high 222 carries. He gained a new AFL record 1,121 yards at 5.0 yards per carry, a league-high average; (Note: Minimum 100 carries.) six of his eight touchdowns were runs, tied for most in the AFL. Like Alworth, Lowe set a franchise single-season yardage record, surpassing his own tally from 1963; this record was broken by Don Woods in 1974. He was supported by the rookie Foster, with 469 yards. Lincoln only played in ten games, but added 302 yards and 3 touchdowns rushing, plus 376 yards and 4 touchdowns receiving.

San Diego were also statistically dominant on defense, topping the league with the fewest total yards, passing yards, rushing yards and first downs conceded. They were also second in points against, a single points behind the Bills. Defensive end Bob Petrich unofficially (Note: The NFL did not keep sack statistics officially until 1982. Members of the Professional Football Researchers Association have largely reconstructed sack data from 1960 onwards based on official gamebooks, but the NFL does not acknowledge pre-1982 sack numbers.) led the team with 8 1/2 sacks, third most in the AFL. Faison and Ernie Ladd added 7 1/2 and 6 respectively, despite both men expressing dissatisfaction with head coach/general manager Sid Gillman's contract negotiations in August, and stating their intentions to leave at the end of the season. Safety Bud Whitehead led the team in interceptions with 7, tied for second most in the league.

Cornerback Speedy Duncan had 4 interceptions, and also served as the team's kickoff and punt returner. His average of 15.5 yards per punt return led the AFL, (Note: Minimum 10 returns.) and included a league-high two touchdowns. Travenio converted 18 of his 30 field goal attempts, his 60% success rate ranking joint-third in the league. He also converted every one of his 40 extra point attempts, but missed every field goal try of over 40 yards. Four players attempted at least one punt during the season; Hadl and Redman split the bulk of the duties between them, but both posted a worse average than any of the seven regular punters in the league.

=== Schedule ===
Week	Date	Opponent	Result	Record	Venue	Attendance	Recap
1	September 11	**Denver Broncos**	**W** 34–31	1–0	Balboa Stadium	27,022	Recap
2	September 19	at **Oakland Raiders**	**W** 17–6	2–0	Frank Youell Field	21,406	Recap
3	September 26	**Kansas City Chiefs**	**T** 10–10	2–0–1	Balboa Stadium	28,126	Recap
4	October 3	Houston Oilers	**W** 31–14	3–0–1	Balboa Stadium	28,190	Recap
5	October 10	at Buffalo Bills	**W** 34–3	4–0–1	War Memorial Stadium	45,260	Recap
6	October 17	at Boston Patriots	**T** 13–13	4–0–2	Fenway Park	20,924	Recap
7	October 23	at New York Jets	**W** 34–9	5–0–2	Shea Stadium	60,679	Recap
8	October 31	Boston Patriots	**L** 6–22	5–1–2	Balboa Stadium	33,366	Recap
9	November 7	at **Denver Broncos**	**W** 35–21	6–1–2	Bears Stadium	33,073	Recap
10	November 14	at **Kansas City Chiefs**	**L** 7–31	6–2–2	Municipal Stadium	21,968	Recap
11	Bye						
12	November 25	Buffalo Bills	**T** 20–20	6–2–3	Balboa Stadium	27,473	Recap
13	December 4	New York Jets	**W** 38–7	7–2–3	Balboa Stadium	32,169	Recap
14	December 12	at Houston Oilers	**W** 37–26	8–2–3	Rice University	24,120	Recap
15	December 19	**Oakland Raiders**	**W** 24–14	9–2–3	Balboa Stadium	26,056	Recap
Note: Intra-division opponents are in **bold** text.

=== Game summaries ===
==== Week 1: vs. Denver Broncos ====
Week One: Denver Broncos at San Diego Chargers – Game summary

Quarter	1	2	3	4	Total
Broncos	14	3	0	14	**31**
Chargers	3	24	0	7	**34**

at Balboa Stadium, San Diego, California

- Date: September 11
- Game weather: 67 °F (19.4 °C), relative humidity 70%, wind 9 mph
- Game attendance: 27,022
- Box score

Game information

**First quarter**

- DEN – Abner Haynes 2-yard run (Gary Kroner kick), 12:21. Broncos 7–0. **Drive: 3 plays, 4 yards.**
- SDG – Herb Travenio 32-yard field goal, 6:14. Broncos 7–3. **Drive: 11 plays, 53 yards.**
- DEN – Bob Scarpitto 33-yard pass from Mickey Slaughter (Gary Kroner kick), 2:07. Broncos 14–3. **Drive: 8 plays, 76 yards.**

**Second quarter**

- SDG – Gene Foster 2-yard run (Herb Travenio kick), 13:39. Broncos 14–10. **Drive: 8 plays, 78 yards.**
- SDG – Herb Travenio 25-yard field goal, 10:41. Broncos 14–13. **Drive: 4 plays, 9 yards.**
- SDG – Paul Lowe 41-yard run (Herb Travenio kick), 8:06. Chargers 20–14. **Drive: 1 play, 41 yards.**
- SDG – Gene Foster 17-yard run (Herb Travenio kick), 1:29. Chargers 27–14. **Drive: 4 plays, 78 yards.**
- DEN – Gary Kroner 37-yard field goal, 0:01. Chargers 27–17. **Drive: 8 plays, 46 yards.**

**Third quarter**

- No scoring plays.

**Fourth quarter**

- DEN – Cookie Gilchrist 29-yard pass from Mickey Slaughter (Gary Kroner kick), 14:14. Chargers 27–24. **Drive: 3 plays, 51 yards.**
- SDG – Lance Alworth 38-yard pass from John Hadl (Herb Travenio kick), 13:25. Chargers 34–24. **Drive: 3 plays, 54 yards.**
- DEN – Bob Scarpitto 13-yard pass from Mickey Slaughter (Gary Kroner kick), 10:09. Chargers 34–31. **Drive: 5 plays, 66 yards.**

**Top passers**

- DEN – Mickey Slaughter – 16/27, 214 yards, 3 TD
- SDG – John Hadl – 11/25, 246 yards, TD, INT

**Top rushers**

- DEN – Cookie Gilchrist – 17 rushes, 49 yards
- SDG – Paul Lowe – 18 rushes, 124 yards, TD

**Top receivers**

- DEN – Bob Scarpitto – 5 receptions, 108 yards, 2 TD
- SDG – Lance Alworth – 7 receptions, 211 yards, TD

San Diego overcame an early 11-point deficit to win their opener. Hadl's second pass of the game was intercepted and run back to the Chargers 4-yard line, setting up a Denver touchdown. Alworth's 48-yard catch on 3rd and 25 led to a Travenio field goal on the next drive, before the Broncos drove for a second touchdown and a 14–3 lead. San Diego responded with a run of 24 unanswered points, beginning with an 8-play, 78-yard touchdown drive – Foster converted a 3rd and 7 with a 23-yard catch, and eventually scored on a 2-yard run. Ladd recovered a Cookie Gilchrist fumble three plays later, setting up another Travenio field goal. The Broncos went three-and-out on their next possession, and a 22-yard punt started the Chargers at the Denver 41-yard line. Lowe followed a Walt Sweeney block to the right on the next play and broke clear for the go-ahead touchdown. Following a Trevenio miss and a Denver punt, Lowe took a pitch to the right before throwing downfield for Alworth, who was double covered but nonetheless made the catch for a 42-yard gain; Foster scored with a 17-yard run two plays later. Denver managed a field goal with a second to play in the half, but still trailed 27–17 at the break.

Denver missed two field goals in the 3rd quarter, but Lowe fumbled near midfield to set up a Gilchrist touchdown early in the final period. The Chargers responded quickly, with Foster's 36-yard kickoff return soon followed by Alworth's first scoring catch of the season; Hadl found him in stride in the end zone for a 38-yard touchdown. The Broncos needed only five plays to score again, pulling within 34–31 with ten minutes to play. After forcing a three-and-out, Denver reached a 2nd and 10 at the Charger 40, but Ladd forced another Gilchrist fumble, with Faison recovering. San Diego were soon faced with a 3rd and 19, which Hadl converted with a 45-yard pass to Alworth. Lowe converted another 3rd down, and the Chargers ran the clock out.

Alworth and Lowe accounted for 347 of the Chargers' 459 total yards between them.

==== Week 2: at Oakland Raiders ====
Week Two: San Diego Chargers at Oakland Raiders – Game summary

Quarter	1	2	3	4	Total
Chargers	7	3	0	7	**17**
Raiders	0	6	0	0	**6**

at Frank Youell Field, Oakland, California

- Date: September 19
- Game weather: 62 °F (16.7 °C), relative humidity 66%, wind 9 mph
- Game attendance: 21,406
- Box score

Game information

**First quarter**

- SDG – Paul Lowe 5-yard run (Herb Travenio kick), 9:19. Chargers 7–0. **Drive: 10 plays, 72 yards, 5:41.**

**Second quarter**

- OAK – Gene Mingo 48-yard field goal, 14:30. Chargers 7–3. **Drive: 4 plays, -7 yards, 1:34.**
- SDG – Herb Travenio 29-yard field goal, 10:37. Chargers 10–3. **Drive: 7 plays, 15 yards.**
- OAK – Gene Mingo 35-yard field goal, 6:41. Chargers 10–6. **Drive: 10 plays, 32 yards, 3:56.**

**Third quarter**

- No scoring plays.

**Fourth quarter**

- SDG – Lance Alworth 25-yard pass from John Hadl (Herb Travenio kick), 4:47. Chargers 17–6. **Drive: 3 plays, 24 yards, 2:12.**

**Top passers**

- SDG – John Hadl – 11/28, 148 yards, TD
- OAK – Tom Flores – 6/16, 83 yards, INT

**Top rushers**

- SDG – Gene Foster – 21 rushes, 104 yards
- OAK – Tom Flores – 2 rushes, 17 yards

**Top receivers**

- SDG – Lance Alworth – 4 receptions, 71 yards, TD
- OAK – Art Powell – 5 receptions, 72 yards

A strong defensive performance propelled San Diego to their second win. The Chargers took the opening kickoff and drove 72 yards in 10 plays without facing a 3rd down, going ahead to stay on Lowe's 4-yard run. Oakland missed a field goal on their next drive, but were soon given another scoring chance after Hadl's 25-yard punt, this time converting a field goal. The Raiders fumbled a punt return soon afterwards, setting up a 29-yard field goal by Travenio. Further field goal attempts followed, with a success for Oakland and a 22-yard try by Travenio blocked. Degen stopped a Raiders drive with an interception shortly before halftime, leaving San Diego 10–6 up.

There were few scoring threats for either team in the second half, with Oakland failing to cross midfield in six possessions, and San Diego punting on six out of seven possessions. Former Charger Dick Wood replaced Tom Flores as the Raiders' quarterback, but was intercepted by Duncan and Kenny Graham, with the latter running the ball back 29 yards to the Oakland 18-yard line. The offense moved back to a 3rd and 16 from the 24, from where Hadl found Alworth over the middle for a decisive touchdown with five minutes to play.

Wood completed 4 of 14 passes for 31 yards, with 2 interceptions. This gave him a passer rating of 0.0, the first such rating posted against the Chargers.

==== Week 3: vs. Kansas City Chiefs ====
Week Three: Kansas City Chiefs at San Diego Chargers – Game summary

Quarter	1	2	3	4	Total
Chiefs	0	0	7	3	**10**
Chargers	0	3	0	7	**10**

at Balboa Stadium, San Diego, California

- Date: September 26
- Game weather: 67 °F (19.4 °C), relative humidity 67%, wind 8 mph
- Game attendance: 28,126
- Box score

Game information

**First quarter**

- No scoring plays.

**Second quarter**

- SDG – Herb Travenio 19-yard field goal, 7:30. Chargers 3–0. **Drive: 9 plays, 45 yards.**

**Third quarter**

- KAN – Otis Taylor 12-yard pass from Len Dawson (Tommy Brooker kick), 4:49. Chiefs 7–3. **Drive: 1 play, 12 yards.**

**Fourth quarter**

- SDG – Speedy Duncan 64-yard punt return (Herb Travenio kick), 7:24. Chargers 10–7.
- KAN – Tommy Brooker 28-yard field goal, 0:49. Tied 10–10. **Drive: 11 plays, 59 yards.**

**Top passers**

- KAN – Len Dawson – 14/26, 144 yards, TD, 2 INT
- SDG – John Hadl – 11/27, 82 yards, 3 INT

**Top rushers**

- KAN – Len Dawson – 3 rushes, 46 yards
- SDG – Paul Lowe – 13 rushes, 55 yards

**Top receivers**

- KAN – Curtis McClinton – 5 receptions, 62 yards
- SDG – Gene Foster – 4 receptions, 42 yards

Two punt returns were key in a defensive tie. A missed 41-yard field goal attempt by Travenio was the closest either side came to scoring in the opening period. Hadl was intercepted on the first play of the 2nd quarter, but Whitehead intercepted Len Dawson on the ensuing drive. A 22-yard pass from Lowe to Foster then helped the Chargers move into field goal range, and Travenio opened the scoring from 19 yards out. The score remained 3–0 at halftime.

Hadl's first two passes of the second half were both intercepted, though neither turnover led to any points. Later in the quarter, though, a Hadl punt was run back 28 yards to the Chargers 25-yard line, and a penalty moved the ball to the 12-yard line. Dawson immediately threw a go-ahead touchdown pass. The next six drives ended in punts – Duncan fielded the last of these at his own 34 and angled diagonally left through blockers before breaking free for a 66-yard touchdown return. Duncan added an interception two plays later, but the Chargers were forced to punt. The Chiefs then faced a 4th and 7 from the San Diego 48-yard line, which they converted when Dawson scrambled for 40 yards. A penalty pushed Kansas City backwards, and they settled for a game-tying field goal with 49 seconds to play. San Diego reached the Chiefs 38 as time expired.

The Chargers' offense produced a season-low 186 yards. Hadl completed 11 of 27 pass attempts, for 82 yards and 3 interceptions.

==== Week 4: vs. Houston Oilers ====
Week Four: Houston Oilers at San Diego Chargers – Game summary

Quarter	1	2	3	4	Total
Oilers	0	0	0	14	**14**
Chargers	0	10	14	7	**31**

at Balboa Stadium, San Diego, California

- Date: October 3
- Game weather: 72 °F (22.2 °C), relative humidity 42%, wind 8 mph
- Game attendance: 28,190
- Box score

Game information

**First quarter**

- No scoring plays.

**Second quarter**

- SDG – Herb Travenio 14-yard field goal, 9:11. Chargers 3–0. **Drive: 13 plays, 79 yards.**
- SDG – Lance Alworth 69-yard pass from John Hadl (Herb Travenio kick), 5:08. Chargers 10–0. **Drive: 3 plays, 79 yards.**

**Third quarter**

- SDG – Dave Kocourek 15-yard pass from John Hadl (Herb Travenio kick), 10:37. Chargers 17–0. **Drive: 9 plays, 80 yards.**
- SDG – Earl Faison 24-yard interception return (Herb Travenio kick), 1:48. Chargers 24–0.

**Fourth quarter**

- HOU – Charley Hennigan 9-yard pass from Don Trull (George Blanda kick), 14:14. Chargers 24–7. **Drive: 5 plays, 51 yards.**
- HOU – Don Trull 7-yard run (George Blanda kick), 9:39. Chargers 24–14. **Drive: 5 plays, 71 yards.**
- SDG – Lance Alworth 57-yard pass from John Hadl (Herb Travenio kick), 7:35. Chargers 31–14. **Drive: 4 plays, 74 yards.**

**Top passers**

- HOU – Don Trull – 3/11, 78 yards, TD, INT
- SDG – John Hadl – 14/26, 242 yards, 3 TD

**Top rushers**

- HOU – Ode Burrell – 9 rushes, 30 yards
- SDG – Paul Lowe – 20 rushes, 157 yards

**Top receivers**

- HOU – Ode Burrell – 4 receptions, 54 yards
- SDG – Lance Alworth – 4 receptions, 145 yards, 2 TD

San Diego dominated the bulk of the game, then held off a late Houston rally to win. The Chargers drove 79 yards in 13 plays to take the lead early in the 2nd quarter – Foster carried 6 times for 38 yards, Lowe carried 4 times for 32 yards, and Travenio kicked a 14-yard field goal. On their next possession, Hadl found Alworth in stride for a 69-yard touchdown pass, and San Diego led 10–0 at halftime.

On the first possession of the second half, Lowe carried 3 times for 10 yards, and Hadl threw a 15-yard touchdown to Kocourek on 3rd and 11. Late in the 3rd quarter backup quarterback Don Trull entered the game for Blanda. His first attempt was a swing pass intercepted by Faison and returned 24 yards for a touchdown. At this point Houston had failed to cross midfield in any of their nine possessions. They improved on their next two possessions with a pair of 5-play touchdown drives, Trull passing for one score and running for the other. With their lead cut to 24–14 midway through the final quarter, San Diego soon reached a 3rd and 11 at their own 43-yard line, whereupon Hadl and Alworth combined again, this time for a decisive 57-yard touchdown.

Hadl completed 14 of 26 passes for 242 yards, 3 touchdowns and no interceptions. Alworth caught 4 passes for 145 yards and 2 touchdowns. San Diego outrushed Houston by 271 yards to 47, with Lowe carrying 20 times for 157 yards and Foster carrying 10 times for 73 yards.

==== Week 5: at Buffalo Bills ====
Week Five: San Diego Chargers at Buffalo Bills – Game summary

Quarter	1	2	3	4	Total
Chargers	0	14	17	3	**34**
Bills	3	0	0	0	**3**

at War Memorial Stadium, Buffalo, New York

- Date: October 10
- Game weather: 48 °F (8.9 °C), relative humidity 92%, wind 9 mph
- Game attendance: 45,260
- Box score

Game information

**First quarter**

- BUF – Pete Gogolak 38-yard field goal, 10:58. Bills 3–0. **Drive: 8 plays, 16 yards.**

**Second quarter**

- SDG – Lance Alworth 14-yard pass from John Hadl (Herb Travenio kick), 12:47. Chargers 7–3. **Drive: 5 plays, 67 yards.**
- SDG – Keith Lincoln 8-yard pass from John Hadl (Herb Travenio kick), 8:11. Chargers 14–3. **Drive: 4 plays, 44 yards.**

**Third quarter**

- SDG – Herb Travenio 15-yard field goal, 9:51. Chargers 17–3. **Drive: 11 plays, 77 yards.**
- SDG – Lance Alworth 52-yard pass from John Hadl (Herb Travenio kick), 6:50. Chargers 24–3. **Drive: 4 plays, 73 yards, 2:12.**
- SDG – Bud Whitehead 35-yard interception return (Herb Travenio kick), 6:00. Chargers 31–3.

**Fourth quarter**

- SDG – Herb Travenio 15-yard field goal, 8:19. Chargers 34–3. **Drive: 4 plays, 8 yards.**

**Top passers**

- SDG – John Hadl – 18/29, 314 yards, 3 TD, INT
- BUF – Daryle Lamonica – 8/14, 60 yards, 2 INT

**Top rushers**

- SDG – Paul Lowe – 19 rushes, 37 yards
- BUF – Billy Joe – 4 rushes, 22 yards

**Top receivers**

- SDG – Lance Alworth – 8 receptions, 168 yards, 2 TD
- BUF – Ed Rutkowski – 4 receptions, 44 yards

San Diego dealt the defending AFL champions their first defeat of the season with a one-sided win in Buffalo. The Bills scored their only points of the day with a field goal from the game's first drive. Travenio had a 22-yard field goal attempt blocked soon afterwards, but San Diego took the lead early in the 2nd quarter after a 5-play, 67-yard drive, with Lincoln's 31-yard pass to Norton the longest play. They finished the drive with Lowe improvising a lateral to Hadl on a planned running play, allowing the quarterback to find Alworth for a 14-yard touchdown. The Bills went three-and-out, and Duncan's 26-yard punt return started his offense off at the Buffalo 44-yard line. They needed only four plays to score from there, with Hadl completing a 35-yard pass to Alworth and an 8-yard touchdown to Lincoln. Buffalo later reached a 2nd and 10 at the Charger 15-yard line, but Duncan intercepted Jack Kemp in the end zone, leaving the score at 14–3 going into the interval.

The Chargers quickly pulled away in the second half, scoring a field goal on their first drive and a touchdown on their second (a 52-yard pass from Hadl to Alworth). On the next play from scrimmage, Whitehead intercepted Kemp and returned the ball 35 yards for a touchdown. Later, George Gross recovered a fumble and Travenio added another field goal to complete the scoring. Whitehead also intercepted a pair of passes by Buffalo backup Daryle Lamonica as the game wore on.

San Diego had two 100-yard receivers, as Alworth caught 8 passes for 168 yards and 2 touchdowns and Norton caught 6 for 107 yards. San Diego outgained Buffalo by over 300 yards (458–150).

==== Week 6: at Boston Patriots ====
Week Six: San Diego Chargers at Boston Patriots – Game summary

Quarter	1	2	3	4	Total
Chargers	3	10	0	0	**13**
Patriots	0	7	3	3	**13**

at Fenway Park, Boston, Massachusetts

- Date: October 17
- Game weather: 46 °F (7.8 °C), relative humidity 68%, wind 11 mph
- Game attendance: 20,924
- Box score

Game information

**First quarter**

- SDG – Herb Travenio 40-yard field goal, 0:46. Chargers 3–0. **Drive: 7 plays, 40 yards.**

**Second quarter**

- BOS – Ron Burton 73-yard pass from Babe Parilli (Gino Cappelletti kick), 14:13. Patriots 7–3. **Drive: 3 plays, 76 yards.**
- SDG – Lance Alworth 85-yard pass from John Hadl (Herb Travenio kick), 6:50. Chargers 10–7. **Drive: 2 plays, 85 yards, 7:55.**
- SDG – Herb Travenio 10-yard field goal, 0:05. Chargers 13–7. **Drive: 1 play, 0 yards.**

**Third quarter**

- BOS – Gino Cappelletti 21-yard field goal, 10:03. Chargers 13–10. **Drive: 4 plays, 4 yards.**

**Fourth quarter**

- BOS – Gino Cappelletti 22-yard field goal, 9:26. Tied 13–13. **Drive: 6 plays, 27 yards.**

**Top passers**

- SDG – John Hadl – 10/22, 168 yards, TD, INT
- BOS – Babe Parilli – 5/24, 132 yards, TD, INT

**Top rushers**

- SDG – Paul Lowe – 21 rushes, 91 yards
- BOS – Ron Burton – 8 rushes, 23 yards

**Top receivers**

- SDG – Lance Alworth – 3 receptions, 109 yards, TD
- BOS – Ron Burton – 2 receptions, 78 yards, TD

San Diego were unable to score in the second half as they tied the winless Patriots. In the 1st quarter, Warren stopped a Boston drive with an interception. Later, Lowe's 23-yard run set up a Travenio field goal. Babe Parilli responded with a 73-yard touchdown pass early in the 2nd quarter. The Patriots threatened to go further in front on their next drive, but Warren intercepted Parilli in the end zone. Later in the quarter, San Diego faced a 2nd and 15 from their own 15-yard line after Hadl was sacked. Hadl found Alworth in stride at the Boston 40 en route to an 85-yard touchdown. Travenio was short on a field goal attempt late in the half, but the Patriots went three-and-out, Whitehead blocked a punt and DeLong recovered at the Boston 2-yard line. Travenio came straight back in to convert a 10-yard kick with 5 seconds left in the half.

Trailing 13–7 entering the second half, Boston soon halved the deficit with a Gino Cappelletti field goal after Duncan fumbled on a punt return. The Patriots had a chance to score again later in the quarter after another special teams error, the long snap on a punt going over Redman's head and setting Boston up at the 6-yard line. A Patriots touchdown was negated by a penalty, and Duncan blocked another Cappelletti field goal attempt. Hadl was intercepted on the next play, but Boston again came away with no points after the Charger defense stuffed a run for no gain on 4th and goal from the 1. San Diego went three-and-out, Boston drove from the Charger 42-yard line to the 15 and Cappelletti tied the score with a 22-yard kick midway through the final quarter. San Diego then reached a 4th and 4 at the Boston 34-yard line, but another bad snap prevented Travenio from attempting a go-ahead field goal. From there, both sides punted once, and the game ended with the Patriots at their own 39.

Lowe rushed 21 times for 91 yards, and added 4 catches for 31 yards. San Diego outgained Boston by 284 yards to 178, with over a third of the game's total offensive yards coming on the two long touchdown passes.

==== Week 7: at New York Jets ====
Week Seven: San Diego Chargers at New York Jets – Game summary

Quarter	1	2	3	4	Total
Chargers	0	10	14	10	**34**
Jets	3	3	0	3	**9**

at Shea Stadium, New York, New York

- Date: October 23
- Game weather: 61 °F (16.1 °C), relative humidity 78%, wind 11 mph
- Game attendance: 60,679
- Box score

Game information

**First quarter**

- NYJ – Jim Turner 12-yard field goal, 4:58. Jets 3–0. **Drive: 7 plays, 49 yards.**

**Second quarter**

- SDG – Paul Lowe 8-yard run (Herb Travenio kick), 14:20. Chargers 7–3. **Drive: 8 plays, 64 yards.**
- NYJ – Jim Turner 24-yard field goal, 7:51. Chargers 7–6. **Drive: 5 plays, 33 yards.**
- SDG – Herb Travenio 20-yard field goal, 1:23. Chargers 10–6. **Drive: 9 plays, 54 yards.**

**Third quarter**

- SDG – Dave Kocourek 2-yard pass from John Hadl (Herb Travenio kick), 11:19. Chargers 17–6. **Drive: 4 plays, 11 yards.**
- SDG – Paul Lowe 59-yard run (Herb Travenio kick), 0:18. Chargers 24–6. **Drive: 7 plays, 81 yards.**

**Fourth quarter**

- NYJ – Jim Turner 40-yard field goal, 10:20. Chargers 24–9. **Drive: 10 plays, 37 yards.**
- SDG – Herb Travenio 19-yard field goal, 5:16. Chargers 27–9. **Drive: 13 plays, 69 yards.**
- SDG – Lance Alworth 57-yard pass from Don Breaux (Herb Travenio kick), 1:51. Chargers 34–9. **Drive: 3 plays, 49 yards.**

**Top passers**

- SDG – John Hadl – 16/28, 182 yards, TD, INT
- NYJ – Mike Taliaferro – 17/34, 205 yards

**Top rushers**

- SDG – Paul Lowe – 16 rushes, 110 yards, 2 TD
- NYJ – Matt Snell – 15 rushes, 69 yards

**Top receivers**

- SDG – Lance Alworth – 7 receptions, 142 yards, TD
- NYJ – Bill Mathis – 3 receptions, 58 yards

San Diego pulled away in the second half to reach the midway point of the season unbeaten. In the opening quarter, New York made one field goal and had another scoring chance after Duncan fumbled the ensuing kickoff. However, Ladd blocked a second field goal attempt, and the Chargers drove 64 yards in 8 plays to take the lead on Lowe's 8-yard run around right end. A threatening Jets drive was halted when Zeman forced a fumble that Buncom recovered at his own 31-yard line, but Redman shanked a punt for only 11 yards soon afterwards, setting up another New York field goal. Alworth's 39-yard catch helped set up a 20-yard Travenio field goal, and the Chargers led 10–6 at halftime.

Gross recovered a fumble at the New York 11-yard line three plays into the second half, setting up a Hadl-to-Kocourek touchdown on 3rd and goal from the 2. Duncan's 51-yard punt return gave them another scoring chance soon afterwards, but Travenio missed a 41-yard kick. On the following Chargers drive, they moved from their own 19-yard line to their own 41-yard line, from where Lowe again went around right end, following blocks from Sweeney and Ron Mix en route to a 59-yard touchdown. The teams exchanged field goals in the final quarter, and Chargers backup quarterback Don Breaux completed the scoring with a 57-yard touchdown to Alworth.

Lowe and Alworth again accounted for the majority of San Diego's yards, with a combined 252 of 342. New York fumbled six times, with the Chargers recovering four of them.

==== Week 8: vs. Boston Patriots ====
Week Eight: Boston Patriots at San Diego Chargers – Game summary

Quarter	1	2	3	4	Total
Patriots	9	0	3	10	**22**
Chargers	0	0	0	6	**6**

at Balboa Stadium, San Diego, California

- Date: October 31
- Game weather: 62 °F (16.7 °C), relative humidity 88%, wind 9 mph
- Game attendance: 33,366
- Box score

Game information

**First quarter**

- BOS – Safety, Jay Cunningham tackled Speedy Duncan in end zone, 3:06. Chargers 2–0.
- BOS – Gino Cappelletti 29-yard pass from Babe Parilli (Gino Cappelletti kick), 1:28. Chargers 9–0. **Drive: 4 plays, 49 yards.**

**Second quarter**

- No scoring plays.

**Third quarter**

- BOS – Gino Cappelletti 30-yard field goal, 1:04. Chargers 12–0. **Drive: 4 plays, 5 yards.**

**Fourth quarter**

- BOS – Gino Cappelletti 46-yard pass from Babe Parilli (Gino Cappelletti kick), 11:52. Chargers 19–0. **Drive: 1 play, 46 yards.**
- BOS – Gino Cappelletti 33-yard field goal, 9:03. Chargers 22–0. **Drive: 4 plays, 3 yards.**
- SDG – Keith Lincoln 1-yard run (pass failed), 7:08. Chargers 22–6. **Drive: 5 plays, 80 yards.**

**Top passers**

- BOS – Babe Parilli – 7/21, 148 yards, 2 TD, 2 INT
- SDG – John Hadl – 13/26, 119 yards, 3 INT

**Top rushers**

- BOS – Larry Garron – 11 rushes, 87 yards
- SDG – Paul Lowe – 12 rushes, 47 yards

**Top receivers**

- BOS – Gino Cappelletti – 3 receptions, 82 yards, 2 TD
- SDG – Don Norton – 5 receptions, 106 yards

San Diego again struggled with the Patriots, sustaining their first defeat of the season while Boston got their first win. Gross (with a fumble recovery) and Whitehead (with an interception) both stopped drives in Chargers territory, but Hadl was intercepted on the ensuing possession both times. Boston took the lead when Duncan fielded a punt at his own 2-yard line and circling back into the end zone, where he was tackled for a safety. After a Chargers free kick, the Patriots drove 49 yards for a touchdown pass from Parilli to Cappelletti. Boston had further scoring chances in the first half, but Dick Harris intercepted a Parilli pass, and Cappelletti missed a field goal, leaving the score at 9–0.

The Chargers got into field goal range on their first drive of the 3rd quarter, but Travenio was short from 49 yards out. Three further errors (a Hadl interception, a blocked Travenio field goal and a Breaux interception) set up a further 13 points for Boston. Finally, Norton's 61-yard catch and run set up Lincoln's 1-yard touchdown run, preventing a shutout with seven minutes to play, but San Diego failed to cross midfield on their lone possession after that.

Hadl and Breaux threw no touchdowns and four interceptions between them. Norton caught 5 passes for 106 yards.

==== Week 9: at Denver Broncos ====
Week Nine: San Diego Chargers at Denver Broncos – Game summary

Quarter	1	2	3	4	Total
Chargers	0	7	14	14	**35**
Broncos	0	7	14	0	**21**

at Bears Stadium, Denver, Colorado

- Date: November 7
- Game weather: 46 °F (7.8 °C), relative humidity 43%, wind 4 mph
- Game attendance: 33,073
- Box score

Game information

**First quarter**

- No scoring plays.

**Second quarter**

- DEN – Nemiah Wilson 65-yard interception return (Gary Kroner kick), 14:50. Broncos 7–0.
- SDG – Keith Lincoln 6-yard pass from John Hadl (Herb Travenio kick), 9:52. Tied 7–7. **Drive: 8 plays, 74 yards.**
- SDG – Keith Lincoln 66-yard pass from John Hadl (Herb Travenio kick), 1:51. Chargers 14–7. **Drive: 1 play, 66 yards.**
- DEN – Abner Haynes 1-yard run (Gary Kroner kick), 0:22. Tied 14–14. **Drive: 12 plays, 71 yards.**

**Third quarter**

- SDG – Lance Alworth 34-yard pass from Keith Lincoln (Herb Travenio kick), 12:10. Chargers 21–14. **Drive: 3 plays, 48 yards.**
- DEN – Cookie Gilchrist 1-yard run (Gary Kroner kick), 3:33. Tied 21–21. **Drive: 6 plays, 58 yards.**

**Fourth quarter**

- SDG – Paul Lowe 45-yard pass from John Hadl (Herb Travenio kick), 6:15. Chargers 28–21. **Drive: 7 plays, 80 yards.**
- SDG – Keith Lincoln 1-yard run (Herb Travenio kick), 3:22. Chargers 35–21. **Drive: 4 plays, 15 yards.**

**Top passers**

- SDG – John Hadl – 13/23, 256 yards, 3 TD, 2 INT
- DEN – John McCormick – 18/36, 209 yards, 3 INT

**Top rushers**

- SDG – Paul Lowe – 17 rushes, 112 yards
- DEN – Wendell Hayes – 12 rushes, 46 yards

**Top receivers**

- SDG – Keith Lincoln – 2 receptions, 73 yards, 2 TD
- DEN – Lionel Taylor – 7 receptions, 114 yards

Lincoln scored three touchdowns and passed for another, and San Diego pulled away from a tied game in the final quarter. Graham intercepted a pass late in a scoreless 1st quarter, and the Chargers reached a 3rd and 3 at the Denver 39-yard line. Then, on the first play of the 2nd quarter, Alworth bobbled a Hadl pass, which was intercepted and returned 65 yards for a touchdown. San Diego came back with an 8-play, 74-yard drive; Lowe broke off a 33-yard run and Hadl combined with Lincoln for a game-tying 7-yard touchdown. After three punts, the Chargers took over on their own 34 and scored on the next play, Hadl finding Lincoln wide open over the middle for a 66-yard score. Denver came back with a touchdown 22 seconds before halftime, tying the score at 14–14.

San Diego restored their lead early in the second half with a trick play, Lincoln passing to Alworth for a 34-yard touchdown, but Gilchrist tied the game later in the quarter. Early in the final period, Travenio had a 38-yard field goal blocked, and Denver missed one from 10 yards out. San Diego then moved from their own 20-yard line to the Denver 45, from where Lowe took a screen pass in for a touchdown. Redman intercepted a pass on the next play from scrimmage and returned the ball 11 yards to the Denver 15-yard line; four plays later, Lincoln ran it in from the 1. A late Graham interception clinched the win.

Lowe rushed 17 times for 112 yards and caught 4 passes for 57 yards and a touchdown. As well as his 34-yard touchdown pass, Lincoln rushed 8 times for 24 yards and a touchdown, and caught 2 passes for 73 yards and 2 touchdowns. He was the first Charger to score three touchdowns in a game. He also became the fifth player and first Charger to have at least one touchdown passing, running and receiving in the same game (LaDainian Tomlinson repeated the feat in 2005).

==== Week 10: at Kansas City Chiefs ====
Week Ten: San Diego Chargers at Kansas City Chiefs – Game summary

Quarter	1	2	3	4	Total
Chargers	0	7	0	0	**7**
Chiefs	10	7	0	14	**31**

at Municipal Stadium, Kansas City, Missouri

- Date: November 14
- Game weather: 42 °F (5.6 °C), relative humidity 69%, wind 11 mph
- Game attendance: 21,968
- Box score

Game information

**First quarter**

- KAN – Tommy Brooker 14-yard field goal, 8:35. Chiefs 3–0. **Drive: 10 plays, 78 yards.**
- KAN – Curtis McClinton 1-yard run (Tommy Brooker kick), 2:13. Chiefs 10–0. **Drive: 4 plays, 7 yards.**

**Second quarter**

- SDG – Lance Alworth 51-yard pass from John Hadl (Herb Travenio kick), 2:33. Chiefs 10–7. **Drive: 4 plays, 60 yards.**
- KAN – Chris Burford 20-yard pass from Len Dawson (Tommy Brooker kick), 1:15. Chiefs 17–7. **Drive: 3 plays, 35 yards.**

**Third quarter**

- No scoring plays.

**Fourth quarter**

- KAN – Curtis McClinton 7-yard pass from Len Dawson (Tommy Brooker kick), 11:16. Chiefs 24–7. **Drive: 9 plays, 67 yards.**
- KAN – Mack Lee Hill 8-yard pass from Len Dawson (Tommy Brooker kick), 3:50. Chiefs 31–7. **Drive: 8 plays, 54 yards.**

**Top passers**

- SDG – John Hadl – 7/18, 152 yards, TD, 4 INT
- KAN – Len Dawson – 13/22, 170 yards, 3 TD, INT

**Top rushers**

- SDG – Paul Lowe – 12 rushes, 48 yards
- KAN – Mack Lee Hill – 11 rushes, 76 yards

**Top receivers**

- SDG – Lance Alworth – 6 receptions, 181 yards, TD
- KAN – Mack Lee Hill – 4 receptions, 57 yards, TD

San Diego turned the ball over seven times in their second defeat of the season. The Chiefs led through an early field goal before they recovered a Hadl fumble at the Charger 7-yard line, setting up a quick touchdown. The Chargers had to start their following drive at their own 1 after Foster had trouble fielding the kickoff. A 52-yard catch by Alworth moved the ball away from their own goal line, and they reached the Kansas City 4-yard line before Hadl was intercepted, ending a 95-yard drive with no points. Another Hadl interception set the Chiefs up in San Diego territory; they reached a 1st and 10 at the 14-yard line before being driven back by penalties and negative plays, eventually punting on 4th and 60. The Chargers then drove from their own 20 to a 4th and 1 from their own 49-yard line. They went for the first down, and Alworth took a pass in the flat before outrunning the defense up the right sideline for a touchdown. Graham intercepted Dawson two plays later, but Hadl was intercepted again on the next play, setting up a Dawson touchdown pass and a 17–7 Kansas City halftime lead.

Breaux came in at quarterback for the second half, but was intercepted on his first drive. Lowe's 33-yard run on the next Charger drive moved them into Kansas City territory, and they reached a 1st and 10 at the 15-yard line. Like the Chiefs in the first half, they were then knocked back out of scoring range by penalties and negative plays, and punted on 4th and 52. Dawson then had touchdown passes on consecutive possessions to put the game away.

Hadl completed 7 of 18 passes for 152 yards, with a touchdown and 4 interceptions; Breaux was intercepted twice. San Diego outgained the Chiefs 330–280, with Alworth's 181 yards accounting for more than half his team's total.

==== Week 12: vs. Buffalo Bills ====
Week Twelve: Buffalo Bills at San Diego Chargers – Game summary

Quarter	1	2	3	4	Total
Bills	7	0	10	3	**20**
Chargers	0	10	0	10	**20**

at Balboa Stadium, San Diego, California

- Date: November 25
- Game weather: 59 °F (15.0 °C), relative humidity 89%, wind 10 mph
- Game attendance: 27,473
- Box score

Game information

**First quarter**

- BUF – Wray Carlton 6-yard pass from Jack Kemp (Pete Gogolak kick), 9:42. Bills 7–0. **Drive: 5 plays, 45 yards.**

**Second quarter**

- SDG – Paul Lowe 6-yard run (Herb Travenio kick), 5:33. Tied 7–7. **Drive: 10 plays, 80 yards.**
- SDG – Herb Travenio 9-yard field goal, 0:18. Chargers 10–7. **Drive: 13 plays, 79 yards.**

**Third quarter**

- BUF – Daryle Lamonica 1-yard run (Pete Gogolak kick), 10:21. Bills 14–10. **Drive: 9 plays, 79 yards.**
- BUF – Pete Gogolak 12-yard field goal, 5:06. Bills 17–10. **Drive: 4 plays, 1 yard.**

**Fourth quarter**

- SDG – Herb Travenio 14-yard field goal, 8:17. Bills 17–13. **Drive: 6 plays, 74 yards.**
- SDG – Paul Lowe offensive fumble recovery in end zone (Herb Travenio kick), 6:23. Chargers 20–17. **Drive: 3 plays, 15 yards.**
- BUF – Pete Gogolak 22-yard field goal, 0:06. Tied 20–20. **Drive: 7 plays, 60 yards.**

**Top passers**

- BUF – Jack Kemp – 17/36, 211 yards, TD, INT
- SDG – John Hadl – 18/37, 315 yards, 2 INT

**Top rushers**

- BUF – Wray Carlton – 6 rushes, 14 yards
- SDG – Paul Lowe – 20 rushes, 69 yards, TD

**Top receivers**

- BUF – Paul Costa – 3 receptions, 80 yards
- SDG – Lance Alworth – 7 receptions, 127 yards

San Diego and Buffalo traded leads as a battle of division leaders ended in a tie. Foster lost a fumble on the fourth play of the game, and Kemp threw a touchdown five plays later. The next three Chargers drives ended with a missed 37-yard field goal attempt by Travenio and two Hadl interceptions, while Buffalo punted three times. San Diego then drove 80 yards in 10 plays without facing a 3rd down, tying the score on a 6-yard run by Lowe. On their next possession, they drove 79 yards to the Buffalo 1-yard line before Foster dropped a pass in the end zone; they settled for a 9-yard Travenio field goal, and a 10–7 half time lead.

Buffalo took the second half kickoff and drove 79 yards in 9 plays to take the lead; Lamonica scored from a yard out while Kemp was temporarily out injured. Three plays later, Alworth broke away for a 65-yard reception, but fumbled while being tackled at the 3-yard line, and Buffalo recovered. On their next possession, San Diego were set to punt from their own 48-yard line, but a wild snap sailed over Hadl's head, setting the Bills up at the San Diego 6-yard line. The Charger defense kept Buffalo out of the end zone, and Pete Gogolak kicked a field goal for a seven-point lead. Gogolak missed a further field goal in the final quarter, and Lincoln took a swing pass 66 yards to the Bills 10-yard line, setting up a successful Travenio kick. Three plays later, Westmoreland intercepted Kemp at the Buffalo 43-yard line and returned the ball 28 yards. On 3rd and 6, Hadl ran the ball as far as the 2 before fumbling into the end zone. This time Lowe recovered the loose ball for a 20–17 lead. The next two Bills drives ended with a fumble and a punt, but they had one more chance, starting at their own 25-yard line. Kemp had completions of 35 and 16 yards, as well as a 9-yard run that positioned Gogolak for a game-tying 22-yard field goal with 6 seconds to play.

The teams combined to fumble eight times, with five of those recovered by the opposition. San Diego committed five of the game's eight total turnovers.

==== Week 13: vs. New York Jets ====
Week Thirteen: New York Jets at San Diego Chargers – Game summary

Quarter	1	2	3	4	Total
Jets	0	0	7	0	**7**
Chargers	0	17	14	7	**38**

at Balboa Stadium, San Diego, California

- Date: December 4
- Game weather: 62 °F (16.7 °C), relative humidity 38%, wind 7 mph
- Game attendance: 32,169
- Box score

Game information

**First quarter**

- No scoring plays.

**Second quarter**

- SDG – Keith Lincoln 1-yard run (Herb Travenio kick), 14:58. Chargers 7–0. **Drive: 10 plays, 61 yards.**
- SDG – Keith Lincoln 25-yard pass from John Hadl (Herb Travenio kick), 5:09. Chargers 14–0. **Drive: 8 plays, 58 yards.**
- SDG – Herb Travenio 26-yard field goal, 3:17. Chargers 17–0. **Drive: 4 plays, -4 yards.**

**Third quarter**

- SDG – Kenny Graham 51-yard interception return (Herb Travenio kick), 14:16. Chargers 24–0.
- NYJ – Don Maynard 21-yard pass from Joe Namath (Jim Turner), 9:35. Chargers 24–7. **Drive: 11 plays, 82 yards.**
- SDG – Lance Alworth 46-yard pass from John Hadl (Herb Travenio kick), 7:30. Chargers 31–7. **Drive: 4 plays, 75 yards.**

**Fourth quarter**

- SDG – Lance Alworth 36-yard pass from John Hadl (Herb Travenio kick), 12:48. Chargers 38–7. **Drive: 7 plays, 72 yards.**

**Top passers**

- NYJ – Joe Namath – 18/34, 179 yards, TD, 3 INT
- SDG – John Hadl – 13/19, 236 yards, 3 TD, INT

**Top rushers**

- NYJ – Matt Snell – 7 rushes, 28 yards
- SDG – Paul Lowe – 14 rushes, 71 yards

**Top receivers**

- NYJ – Don Maynard – 5 receptions, 83 yards, TD
- SDG – Lance Alworth – 7 receptions, 147 yards, 2 TD

San Diego forced four turnovers by Jets quarterback Joe Namath in an easy victory. The Chargers' first two drives ended with interceptions thrown by Hadl and Lincoln, but the Jets could only answer with two field goal tries, one missed and one blocked. After the latter of these, San Diego drove 61 yards in 10 plays to take the lead on Lincoln's 1-yard run. Graham intercepted Namath on the Chargers 42-yard line on the following possession, and San Diego drove to another Lincoln touchdown, this time a tackle-breaking 25-yard catch and run on 3rd and 7. Petrich and Gross sacked Namath on the next play from scrimmage, forcing a sack that Faison recovered at the New York 15-yard line. That led to a Travenio field goal and, after a Degen interception, a 17–0 halftime lead.

On the first play of the second half, Graham intercepted a Namath pass near the right sideline, and returned it 51 yards for a touchdown. Namath was able to get the Jets on the scoreboard with a touchdown pass on their next drive, but San Diego restored their 24-point advantage only four plays later, with Hadl finding Alworth open at the 5 for a 46-yard touchdown. After stopping the Jets on downs, the Chargers ended the scoring early in the final quarter with another long Hadl-to-Alworth connection, this time of 36 yards.

Lincoln rushed 13 times for 57 yards and a touchdown, while catching 2 passes for 46 yards and another touchdown. Alworth caught 7 passes for 147 yards and two touchdowns. The result left San Diego at 7–2–3, leading the Raiders (7–4–1) and Chiefs (6–4–2), and able to clinch the AFL West title with a win the following week.

==== Week 14: at Houston Oilers ====
Week Fourteen: San Diego Chargers at Houston Oilers – Game summary

Quarter	1	2	3	4	Total
Chargers	7	7	3	20	**37**
Oilers	2	10	7	7	**26**

at Rice Stadium, Houston, Texas

- Date: December 12
- Game weather: 72 °F (22.2 °C), relative humidity 75%, wind 8 mph
- Game attendance: 24,120
- Box score

Game information

**First quarter**

- SDG – Speedy Duncan 63-yard punt return (Herb Travenio kick), 4:22. Chargers 7–0.
- HOU – Safety, Oilers sacked John Hadl in end zone, 0:00. Chargers 7–2.

**Second quarter**

- SDG – Lance Alworth 5-yard pass from John Hadl (Herb Travenio kick), 7:41. Chargers 14–2. **Drive: 11 plays, 85 yards.**
- HOU – George Blanda 40-yard field goal, 2:54. Chargers 14–5. **Drive: 6 plays, 25 yards.**
- HOU – Charley Hennigan 10-yard pass from George Blanda (George Blanda kick), 0:51. Chargers 14–12. **Drive: 8 plays, 55 yards.**

**Third quarter**

- HOU – Dick Compton 30-yard pass from George Blanda (George Blanda kick), 8:32. Oilers 19–14. **Drive: 7 plays, 52 yards.**
- SDG – Herb Travenio 32-yard field goal, 4:59. Oilers 19–17. **Drive: 7 plays, 48 yards.**

**Fourth quarter**

- SDG – Herb Travenio 12-yard field goal, 12:29. Chargers 20–19. **Drive: 9 plays, 62 yards.**
- HOU – Charley Hennigan 9-yard pass from George Blanda (George Blanda kick), 11:35. Oilers 26–20. **Drive: 2 plays, 30 yards.**
- SDG – John Hadl 1-yard run (Herb Travenio kick), 6:28. Chargers 27–26. **Drive: 13 plays, 76 yards.**
- SDG – Herb Travenio 32-yard field goal, 3:00. Chargers 30–26. **Drive: 4 plays, 2 yards.**
- SDG – Paul Lowe 15-yard run (Herb Travenio kick), 1:46. Chargers 37–26. **Drive: 1 play, 15 yards.**

**Top passers**

- SDG – John Hadl – 11/25, 146 yards, TD, INT
- HOU – George Blanda – 13/40, 212 yards, 3 TD, 2 INT

**Top rushers**

- SDG – Paul Lowe – 19 rushes, 99 yards, TD
- HOU – Ode Burrell – 10 rushes, 13 yards

**Top receivers**

- SDG – Keith Lincoln – 5 receptions, 87 yards
- HOU – Bob McLeod – 4 receptions, 59 yards

The Chargers clinched their division after scoring the game's final 17 points. Duncan opened the scoring in the 1st quarter, taking a punt and eluding several tacklers on a 63-yard touchdown return. On their next possession, the Chargers faced a 3rd and 22 from their own 8-yard line, and Hadl was brought down by three Oilers in the end zone for a safety. After forcing a punt, San Diego extended their lead with an 11-play, 85-yard drive: Lowe had a 23-yard run, Norton converted a 3rd and 10 with a 27-yard catch, and Alworth scored on a 5-yard touchdown reception. The Chargers soon had another scoring chance, but Hadl was intercepted in Houston territory, and the Oilers fought back with a field goal and a Blanda touchdown pass, trailing only 14–12 at halftime.

Houston's momentum continued into the second half as they recovered a Norton fumble and drove to another Blanda touchdown pass. The Chargers responded with field goals on consecutive drives, the first set up by a 41-yard Lincoln catch and the second by three consecutive runs that covered 16, 14 and 17 yards (the first by Lincoln, the next two by Lowe). Blanda threw his third touchdown only three plays later, putting Houston up 26–20 with 11 minutes to play. Hadl made several key plays on an answering touchdown drive, converting a 3rd and 10 with a 22-yard pass to Lincoln and having runs of 9, 23 and 14 yards. Finally, he scored on 4th and goal with a 1-yard quarterback sneak. Warren intercepted Blanda three plays later, leading to a third Travenio field goal. The Oilers then turned the ball over on downs at their own 15-yard line, and Lowe went around right end for a touchdown on the next play. Duncan added a late interception near his own goal line.

Both Charger running backs gained over 100 yards of offense. Lowe rushed 19 times for 99 yards and a touchdown, while adding a single catch for 6 yards; Lincoln rushed 11 times for 62 yards and caught 5 passes for 87 yards.

==== Week 15: vs. Oakland Raiders ====
Week Fifteen: Oakland Raiders at San Diego Chargers – Game summary

Quarter	1	2	3	4	Total
Raiders	7	7	0	0	**14**
Chargers	0	7	7	10	**24**

at Balboa Stadium, San Diego, California

- Date: December 19
- Game weather: 49 °F (9.4 °C), relative humidity 55%, wind 8 mph
- Game attendance: 26,056
- Box score

Game information

**First quarter**

- OAK – Art Powell 4-yard pass from Tom Flores (Mike Mercer kick), 1:53. Raiders 7–0. **Drive: 11 plays, 65 yards.**

**Second quarter**

- OAK – Clem Daniels 1-yard run (Mike Mercer kick), 3:22. Raiders 14–0. **Drive: 11 plays, 80 yards.**
- SDG – Don Norton 22-yard pass from John Hadl (Herb Travenio kick), 1:34. Raiders 14–7. **Drive: 6 plays, 71 yards.**

**Third quarter**

- SDG – Don Norton 10-yard pass from John Hadl (Herb Travenio kick), 4:35. Tied 7–7. **Drive: 5 plays, 71 yards.**

**Fourth quarter**

- SDG – Lance Alworth 66-yard pass from Don Breaux (Herb Travenio kick), 10:21. Chargers 21–14. **Drive: 6 plays, 80 yards.**
- SDG – Herb Travenio 15-yard field goal, 1:02. Chargers 24–14.

**Top passers**

- OAK – Tom Flores – 20/38, 193 yards, TD, 3 INT
- SDG – John Hadl – 8/15, 192 yards, 2 TD, INT

**Top rushers**

- OAK – Clem Daniels – 19 rushes, 85 yards, TD
- SDG – Gene Foster – 17 rushes, 55 yards

**Top receivers**

- OAK – Clem Daniels – 5 receptions, 72 yards
- SDG – Lance Alworth – 5 receptions, 160 yards, TD

San Diego recovered from a 14–0 deficit to close out their regular season with a win. The Chargers had an early scoring chance, but Hadl was intercepted in the end zone. Oakland then drove 65 yards in 11 plays for a touchdown, maintaining possession with a fake field goal. San Diego were soon threatening to score again, reaching a 4th and goal from the 1-yard line, but MacKinnon came down with Hadl's pass narrowly out of bounds; the Raiders then drove 80 yards in 11 plays to double their lead. Hadl responded with a 37-yard completion to Allison, soon followed by a 22-yard touchdown to Norton, pulling the score back to 14–7 at halftime.

Travenio was short on a 50-yard kick in the 3rd quarter, before Petrich blocked a Raiders field goal try. The Chargers then tied the game with a 5-play, 71-yard drive; Alworth had a 44-yard reception and Norton caught a 10-yard touchdown pass despite being in tight coverage. Breaux came in to replace Hadl and soon lost a fumble, but Allen intercepted Flores two plays later. San Diego then reached a 3rd and 15 at their own 34-yard line, from where Breaux found Alworth on a slant route at the Oakland 45-yard line, and he outran the Raider defense for the go-ahead touchdown. Whitehead intercepted Flores twice in the final ten minutes; Hadl was himself intercepted at the goal line after the first of these, but the second led to a Travenio field goal with a minute to play.

As well as Hadl, Lowe also left the game early – he carried 3 times for 32 yards, enough to break the AFL's single-season rushing yardage record.

=== Standings ===
AFL Western Division
	W	L	T	PCT	DIV	PF	PA	STK
San Diego Chargers	9	2	3	.818	4–1–1	340	227	W3
Oakland Raiders	8	5	1	.615	3–3	298	239	L1
Kansas City Chiefs	7	5	2	.583	4–1–1	322	285	W1
Denver Broncos	4	10	0	.286	0–6	303	392	L4

Note: Tie games were not officially counted in the standings in the AFL.

== Playoffs ==
Round	Date	Opponent	Result	Venue	Attendance	Recap
Championship	December 26	Buffalo Bills	L 0–23	Balboa Stadium	30,361	Recap

=== Game summary ===
==== AFL championship game: vs. Buffalo Bills ====
AFL championship game: Buffalo Bills at San Diego Chargers – Game summary

Quarter	1	2	3	4	Total
Bills	0	14	6	3	23
Chargers	0	0	0	0	0

at Balboa Stadium, San Diego

- Date: December 26
- Game time: 1:00 p.m. PST
- Game weather: 54 °F (12 °C), relative humidity 75%, wind 6 mph
- Game attendance: 30,361
- Referee: Jim Barnhill
- TV announcers (NBC): Curt Gowdy, Paul Christman and Charlie Jones
- Box score

Game information

First quarter

- No scoring plays.

Second quarter

- BUF – Ernie Warlick 18-yard pass from Jack Kemp (Pete Gogolak kick), 4:59. Bills 7–0. Drive: 6 plays, 60 yards.
- BUF – Butch Byrd 74-yard punt return (Pete Gogolak kick), 2:29. Bills 14–0.

Third quarter

- BUF – Pete Gogolak 11-yard field goal, 9:21. Bills 17–0. Drive: 8 plays, 69 yards.
- BUF – Pete Gogolak 39-yard field goal, 0:45. Bills 20–0. Drive: 4 plays, -9 yards.

Fourth quarter

- BUF – Pete Gogolak 32-yard field goal, 11:45. Bills 23–0. Drive: 10 plays, 37 yards.

Top passers

- BUF – Jack Kemp – 8/19, 155 yards, TD, INT
- SDG – John Hadl – 11/23, 140 yards, 2 INT

Top rushers

- BUF – Wray Carlton – 16 rushes, 63 yards
- SDG – Paul Lowe – 12 rushes, 57 yards

Top receivers

- BUF – Bo Roberson – 3 receptions, 88 yards
- SDG – Lance Alworth – 4 receptions, 82 yards

San Diego faced the Eastern division champion Bills (10–3–1) in a rematch of the previous AFL championship game. Having achieved a win and tie against Buffalo during the regular season, having Alworth fit for the game (he had been injured the previous year), and having dominated the league in several major statistical categories, the Chargers were expected to improve on their 20–7 defeat in 1964. Oddsmakers had them as 6 1/2-point favorites before the game.

In the event, Buffalo won the 1965 game more easily, though San Diego had early chances to take the lead. Warren intercepted Kemp at the Chargers 33-yard line early in the game, and Alworth's 20-yard catch moved the ball across midfield, but San Diego were forced to punt. After a Bills punt pinned the Chargers at their own 9-yard line, Lowe went around right end for 47 yards on the next play, but they were pushed back when Hadl was sacked and had to punt again. After another Bills punt, Norton's 35-yard catch helped the Chargers drive from their own 11-yard line to the Buffalo 28 early in the 2nd quarter, but Travenio's 35-yard field goal attempt was short after being partially blocked. The Bills scored two touchdowns in quick succession later in the quarter, via a Kemp touchdown pass and a 74-yard punt return from Butch Byrd. Hadl was intercepted on the next play, but Duncan partially blocked a Gogolak field goal attempt. The Chargers then drove from their own 20-yard line to the Buffalo 24, with Hadl completing a 22-yard pass to Alworth and scrambling for 13 yards on consecutive plays. It was their best field position of the entire game, but led to no points as Travenio missed a 31-yard kick, leaving the halftime score at 14–0.

San Diego went three-and-out on the first possession of the second half, and Buffalo soon added a Gogolak field goal. Duncan returned the ensuing kickoff 49 yards, and the Chargers reached a 4th and 1 at the Buffalo 29-yard line. Hadl was then stopped for a loss of 5 yards. Further Gogolak field goals were set up by a Hadl interception and another failed 4th down conversion attempt.

Hadl completed 11 of 23 passes for 140 yards, while throwing 2 interceptions and being sacked 3 times for losses of 30 yards. Lowe carried 12 times for 57 yards, although 47 of those came on a single carry. Buffalo narrowly outgained the Chargers (260 yards to 223), but had a larger advantage in first downs (23 to 12). Chargers lose their final AFL Championship so in 1966 miss the playoffs the first time since 1962.

== Awards ==
Twelve Chargers were in the squad who faced the Bills in the AFL All-Star game, including five who were named to the Associated Press All-AFL 1st team; there were also six Chargers in the 2nd team. In addition, Alworth received eight votes as the AP AFL player of the year, while Lowe received four; for the equivalent UPI award, they received four votes each. (Note: Kemp of the Bills won both these awards.) Gillman received two votes for coach of the year from both AP and UPI. (Note: Lou Saban of the Bills won both these awards.)

Player	Position	All-Star	AP 1st-team All-Pro	AP 2nd-team All-Pro
Lance Alworth	Flanker	Yes	Yes	
Frank Buncom	Linebacker	Yes		Yes
Speedy Duncan	Cornerback	Yes		Yes
Earl Faison	Defensive end	Yes	Yes	
Kenny Graham	Safety	Yes		Yes
John Hadl	Quarterback	Yes		Yes
Dave Kocourek	Tight end			Yes
Ernie Ladd	Defensive tackle	Yes	Yes	
Keith Lincoln	Running back	Yes		
Paul Lowe	Running back	Yes	Yes	
Ron Mix	Tackle	Yes	Yes	
Walt Sweeney	Guard	Yes		Yes
Ernie Wright	Tackle	Yes		
