= Richard Herman (disambiguation) =

Richard Herman may refer to:

- Richard Herman, chancellor of the University of Illinois at Urbana-Champaign
- Richard Herman (cricketer), Australian former cricketer
- Richard Herman (politician), American politician

== See also ==
- Richard Herrmann, German footballer
- Richard Herrmann (journalist), Norwegian journalist
- Dick Hermann, American football linebacker
- Richard Sherman (disambiguation)
