= Dainard Paulson =

American football player (born 1937)

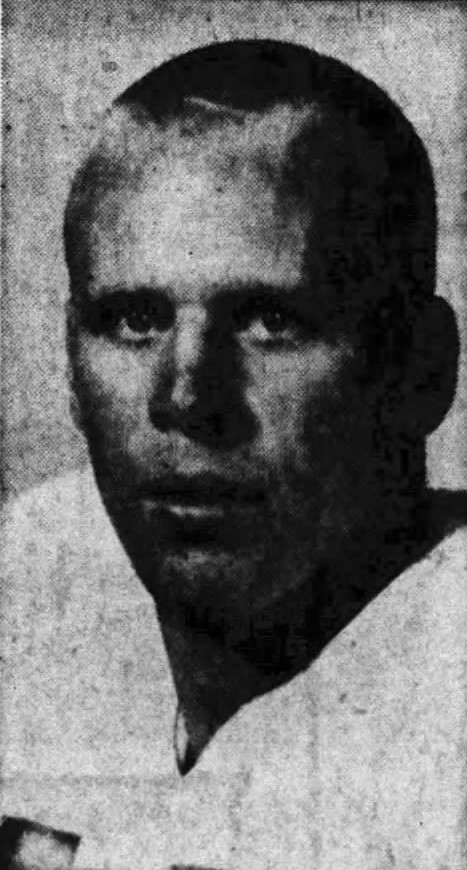
- Paulson in 1961

No. 40
- Position: Defensive back

Personal information
- Born: May 15, 1937 (age 89); Los Angeles, California, U.S.

Career information
- College: Oregon State
- NFL draft: 1961: undrafted

Career history
- New York Titans / Jets (1961–1966)

Awards and highlights
- 2× AFL All-Star (1964, 1965); AFL interceptions leader (1964)

Career NFL statistics
- Games played: 84
- Interceptions: 29
- Touchdowns: 1
- Stats at Pro Football Reference

Dainard Ahlander Paulson (born May 5, 1937) is an American former professional football player who was a defensive back for the New York Titans / Jets of the American Football League (AFL). He played college football for the Oregon State Beavers. With the Jets, he was an AFL All-Star in 1964 and 1965. He co-holds the AFL record for most interceptions in a season.

== Early life ==
Paulson was born on May 15, 1937, in Los Angeles to Hugh and Margaret Paulson. He attended Morningside High School, where he was a quarterback on the school's football team. He also played on the school's baseball team, being named an All-League pitcher in 1955.

== College career ==
After high school, in 1956, Paulson attended El Camino Junior College (now El Camino College) in Los Angeles. He played quarterback on El Camino's football team. In his first collegiate start, Paulson completed 15 of 21 passes for 202 yards and three touchdowns.

In 1957, he transferred to Oregon State College (now Oregon State University), and joined the school's football team under head coach Tommy Prothro. At Oregon State, he played tailback on offense, defensive back on defense, and was also the team's punter. He also became proficient at quick kicks.

In 1958, Paulson received support as an Associated Press All-America candidate. During the 1958 season, he rushed for 354 yards in 93 carries, sixth best in the Pacific Coast Conference (PCC). He also attempted 27 passes, completing 10, for 146 yards, two touchdowns and four interceptions. He was ninth in combined rushing and passing yardage in the PCC, and led the PCC in punting, with 30 punts for a 43 yards-per-punt average.

In 1959 he rushed for 168 yards in 46 carries, and completed four of 14 passes with three interceptions. He was one of the NCAA's top punters in 1959. He was selected the team's most valuable player in 1959.

== Professional career ==
Paulson was not selected in either the AFL or National Football League (NFL) drafts in 1961. In 1961, he was signed as a free agent by the AFL's New York Titans (renamed the New York Jets in 1963). As a rookie, Paulson started at free safety for the Titans under head coach Sammy Baugh. Paulson was not a great tailback in college, but Baugh considered Paulson a hard hitter on the defensive side, and his top defensive back with the Titans. He started all 14 games that season, with one interception.

In 1962, he again started all 14 games; but new coach Bulldog Turner used Paulson at cornerback as well as safety. He had three interceptions, and also punted three times that season. In 1963, future Hall of Fame coach Weeb Ewbank became the Jets head coach. Ewbank started Paulson in 13 games between cornerback and safety, and he had six interceptions. He was tied for sixth in the AFL in interceptions that year.

He was a Jets captain from 1964 to 1966. In 1964, he started 14 games at strong safety for the Jets. Paulson led the AFL with 12 interceptions. His 12 interceptions tied Fred Glick (12 in 1963) for the most interceptions in a season in the AFL's entire 10-year history. On November 29, he intercepted a pass by future Hall of Fame quarterback Len Dawson and returned it 32 yards for a touchdown, in a 27–14 victory over the Kansas City Chiefs. He also had three fumble recoveries that season. His teammate Bill Baird who played cornerback and free safety had eight interceptions that season, fourth best in the AFL.

In 1964, Paulson was selected to play in the AFL All-Star Game. He was named first-team All-AFL by The Sporting News, Newspaper Enterprise Association (NEA) and United Press International (UPI); and second-team All-AFL by the Associated Press. In an NEA poll for each team's Third Down Trophy winner, the 1964 Jets' players chose Paulson as their most valuable player.

Paulson played both strong safety and free safety in 1965, starting 13 games (though it was also reported at the time that he missed three games because of injury). He had seven interceptions and two fumble recoveries. He suffered a hairline fracture to his wrist early in the 1965 season and played with a cast on his right arm. He was tied for second in the AFL in interceptions. He was again selected to play in the AFL All-Star Game, and was named first-team All-AFL by the NEA and UPI, and second-team All-AFL by the AP.

The AP named Paulson the AFL's Defensive Player of the Week based on his performance in a November 8, 1965 game against the Kansas City Chiefs, a 13–10 Jets victory. Going into the game, the Jets were 1–5–1 and the Chiefs were 4–3–1. In that game, Paulson had two interceptions against Len Dawson, combined with Willie West to block a field goal attempt, knocked down a pass and successfully defended against three long passes. Coach Ewbank called Paulson the Jets most consistent defensive player, putting in a fine defensive performance every week.

In 1966, he started 10 games between free safety and strong safety, but did not have any interceptions that season. He did have ½ quarterback-sack. Paulson was traded to the Oakland Raiders before the 1967 season. Paulson had a falling out with a member of the Jets coaching staff over a mistake in coverage against the Buffalo Bills receiver Art Powell, that resulted in Paulson's demanding a trade. The Raiders waived Paulson before the season started.

Paulson spent his entire career with the Titans/Jets from 1961 to 1966 in the defensive backfield, and was said years later to have never missed a game. It was also reported in 1965, however, that he missed three games that year with a hairline fracture of the wrist. His 29 career interceptions with the Jets are second most in team history behind only teammate Bill Baird's 34, and one ahead of Hall of Fame defensive back Darelle Revis. During a three year span from 1963 to 1965, he had 25 interceptions.

== Personal life ==
Before joining the Titans, he served six months in the United States Air Force, and was involved with the Campus Crusade for Christ at Oregon State. On coming to New York to join the Titans, he volunteered his services for the Emmanuel Fellowship in Brooklyn. Dainard become involved with the Fellowship of Christian Athletes after the death of his fiancé to leukemia.

After retiring, he joined the family landscaping business in Los Angeles. He later became a property developer, beginning with that business in Los Angeles and then moving to Washington State. He and Bill Baird worked for the same real estate company while both were living in California in the early 1970s.

In 1973, Paulson and his family moved to Selah, Washington. He worked in the recreational vehicle business for Chinook Mobilodge, in Union Gap, Washington. After retiring from business, he bought and sold an orchard in Selah, where he continues to reside (as of 2025).

As of the 2025-2026 season, his grandson Corey Kispert is entering his fifth year of play at small forward for the National Basketball Association's Atlanta Hawks. Kispert was a first-team consensus All-American basketball player at Gonzaga University in Spokane, Washington; and was a member of Gonzaga's team that reached the 2020-21 NCAA men's championship game, losing to Baylor University. Gonzaga had been 31–0 going into the championship game.

== See also ==
- Other American Football League players
