= Richard Sherman =

Richard Sherman may refer to:

- Richard M. Sherman (1928–2024), American songwriter
- Richard Sherman (American football) (born 1988), American football player
- Richard U. Sherman (1819–1895), New York State politician and newspaper publisher/editor
- Richard Sherman (MP) for Derby
- Richard Sherman, a character from the play The Seven Year Itch

== See also ==
- Richard Herman (disambiguation)
