= 1965 Buffalo Bills season =

6th season in franchise history, second league championship

- Owner: Ralph Wilson
- Head coach: Lou Saban
- Home stadium: War Memorial Stadium

Results
- Record: 10–3–1
- Division place: 1st AFL Eastern
- Playoffs: Won AFL Championship (at Chargers) 23–0

The 1965 Buffalo Bills season was the team's sixth season in the American Football League. Though not as statistically dominant as the previous season, the Bills won a second consecutive league championship.

Although Buffalo's offense was in the middle of the pack in 1965, it was their dominant team defense that kept them atop the league's standings. Buffalo gave up only 226 points (16.1 per game), fewest in the AFL, and one point fewer than AFL Championship runner-up San Diego. The Bills' opportunistic defense led the league in interceptions, with 32, and gave up a league-low four rushing touchdowns all season. Between week 6 of the 1964 season, through week eight of the 1965 season, including two 1964 playoff games, the Bills' defense did not allow a touchdown by rushing, a Professional Football record that still stands.

The Bills, who had led the AFL in points, rushing yards and total yards the previous season, suffered significantly after losing star running back Cookie Gilchrist in the offseason. Statistically, the Bills dropped to 6th (out of 8) in rushing yards, and 7th in passing yards. Still, they managed to finish 3rd in the AFL in points scored, with 313 (22.3 per game).

The Bills' turnover ratio was +18, best in the AFL, and fourth best in AFL history. Buffalo's +87 point differential was second-best in the league in 1965.

Seven Bills made the 1965 AFL All-Star team: safety George Saimes, cornerback Butch Byrd, linebacker Mike Stratton, defensive tackle Tom Sestak, guard Billy Shaw, kicker Pete Gogolak, and quarterback Jack Kemp.

== Personnel ==
=== Coaches/Staff ===
1965 Buffalo Bills staff
Front office: President/owner – Ralph Wilson; Vice-president/minority owner – Pat McGroder; Head coaches: Head coach – Lou Saban; Offensive coaches: Running backs/wide receivers – John Mazur; Offensive line – Jerry Smith	Defensive coaches: Linebackers/Defensive Backs – Joe Collier

=== Final roster ===
1965 Buffalo Bills roster
Quarterbacks: 15 Jack Kemp; 12 Daryle Lamonica; Running backs: 30 Wray Carlton; 33 Billy Joe; 20 Bobby Smith; 32 Donnie Stone; Wide receivers: 48 Pete Mills; 46 Bo Roberson; 40 Ed Rutkowski; Tight ends: 82 Paul Costa; 84 Ernie Warlick	Offensive linemen: 77 Stew Barber T; 60 Dave Behrman C; 50 Al Bemiller G; 73 George Flint G; 79 Dick Hudson T; 67 Joe O'Donnell T/G; 66 Billy Shaw G; Defensive linemen: 88 Tom Day DE; 78 Jim Dunaway DT; 72 Ron McDole DE; 75 Dudley Meredith DT/DE; 76 Henry Schmidt DT; 70 Tom Sestak DT	Linebackers: 64 Harry Jacobs MLB; 52 Bill Laskey OLB; 56 Marty Schottenheimer MLB; 58 Mike Stratton OLB; 51 John Tracey OLB; Defensive backs: 42 Butch Byrd CB; 45 Hagood Clarke SS; 24 Booker Edgerson CB; 49 Floyd Hudlow FS; 27 Tom Janik SS; 26 George Saimes FS; 22 Charley Warner CB; Special teams: 3 Pete Gogolak K; 55 Paul Maguire P	Taxi squad: 81 Bill Groman WR; -- Mailon Kent QB; -- Howard Simpson DE; Reserve list: 85 Glenn Bass WR (IR); -- Jim Davidson T (IR); 44 Elbert Dubenion WR (IR); 80 Charley Ferguson WR (IR); 35 Doug Goodwin RB (IR); 74 Tom Keating DT (IR); 65 Remi Prudhomme G/C (IR); 23 Gene Sykes S (IR)
Note: rookies in italics

== Offseason ==
The Bills lost All-AFL running back Cookie Gilchrist to the Denver Broncos after the 1964 season. Bills running back Wray Carlton would take over as the Bills' lead back.

== Standings ==
AFL Eastern Division
	W	L	T	PCT	DIV	PF	PA	STK
Buffalo Bills	10	3	1	.769	4–2	313	226	L1
New York Jets	5	8	1	.385	3–3	285	303	W1
Boston Patriots	4	8	2	.333	2–4	244	302	W3
Houston Oilers	4	10	0	.286	3–3	298	429	L7

Note: Tie games were not officially counted in the standings in the AFL.

== Schedule ==
Week	Date	Opponent	Result	Record	Venue	Attendance	Recap
1	September 11	**Boston Patriots**	**W** 24–7	1–0	War Memorial Stadium	45,502	Recap
2	September 19	at Denver Broncos	**W** 30–15	2–0	Bears Stadium	30,682	Recap
3	September 26	**New York Jets**	**W** 33–21	3–0	War Memorial Stadium	45,056	Recap
4	October 3	Oakland Raiders	**W** 17–12	4–0	War Memorial Stadium	41,256	Recap
5	October 10	San Diego Chargers	**L** 3–34	4–1	War Memorial Stadium	45,260	Recap
6	October 17	at Kansas City Chiefs	**W** 23–7	5–1	Municipal Stadium	26,941	Recap
7	October 24	Denver Broncos	**W** 31–13	6–1	War Memorial Stadium	45,046	Recap
8	October 31	**Houston Oilers**	**L** 17–19	6–2	War Memorial Stadium	44,267	Recap
9	November 7	at **Boston Patriots**	**W** 23–7	7–2	Fenway Park	24,415	Recap
10	November 14	at Oakland Raiders	**W** 17–14	8–2	Frank Youell Field	19,352	Recap
11	Bye						
12	November 25	at San Diego Chargers	**T** 20–20	8–2–1	Balboa Stadium	27,473	Recap
13	December 5	at **Houston Oilers**	**W** 29–18	9–2–1	Rice Stadium	23,087	Recap
14	December 12	Kansas City Chiefs	**W** 34–25	10–2–1	War Memorial Stadium	40,298	Recap
15	December 19	at **New York Jets**	**L** 12–14	10–3–1	Shea Stadium	57,396	Recap
Note: Intra-division opponents are in **bold** text.

== Player stats ==
=== Passing ===
Player	Comp	Att	Yds	Completion %	TD	INT
Jack Kemp	179	391	2368	45.8	10	18
Daryle Lamonica	29	70	376	41.4	3	6

=== Rushing ===
Player	Att	Yds	Average	Long	TD
Wray Carlton	156	592	3.8	80	6

== Postseason ==
Round	Date	Opponent	Result	Venue	Attendance	Recap
Championship	December 26	at San Diego Chargers	W 23–0	Balboa Stadium	30,361	Recap

=== AFL Championship Game ===
	1	2	3	4	Total
Bills	0	14	6	3	23
Chargers	0	0	0	0	0

Buffalo Bills 23, San Diego Chargers 0

December 26, 1965, at Balboa Stadium, San Diego, California
Attendance: 30,361

Scoring

- BUF – Warlick 18 pass from Kemp (Gogolak kick)
- BUF – Byrd 74 punt return (Gogolak kick)
- BUF – Field goal Gogolak 11
- BUF – Field goal Gogolak 39
- BUF – Field goal Gogolak 32

=== AFL All-Star Game ===
Season	Date	Winner	Most Valuable Player(s)	Site
1965	January 15, 1966	AFL All-Stars 30, Buffalo Bills 19	Offense: Joe Namath, QB, Jets; Defense: Frank Buncom, LB, Chargers	Rice Stadium, Houston

== Awards and Records ==
- Lou Saban, Coach of the Year
