= 1965 Oakland Raiders season =

AFL team season

- Owner: F. Wayne Valley
- General manager: Al Davis
- Head coach: Al Davis
- Home stadium: Frank Youell Field

Results
- Record: 8–5–1
- Division place: 2nd AFL Western
- Playoffs: Did not qualify

The 1965 Oakland Raiders season was the team's sixth in both Oakland and the American Football League. The campaign saw the team attempt to improve upon the prior year's disappointing 5–7–2 record, and finished at 8–5–1. While the effort was a definite improvement, it was not enough to win the division and secure a postseason berth. This was the third and last season for Al Davis as head coach, as he became the AFL commissioner in April 1966, and offensive backs coach John Rauch was promoted.

This was the first of sixteen consecutive winning seasons for the Raiders. It is also notable for the debut of Hall of Fame wide receiver Fred Biletnikoff, the first of several legendary Raiders drafted in the mid-1960s to early 1970s. The eleventh overall selection of the AFL draft out of Florida State, he was an integral part of the team's 1967 and 1976 Super Bowl runs.

It was also the Raiders' last year at Frank Youell Field; they moved to the new Oakland–Alameda County Coliseum in 1966.

== Roster ==
1965 Oakland Raiders roster
Quarterbacks (QB): 15 Tom Flores; 18 Dick Wood; Running backs (RB): 33 Clem Daniels; 30 Roger Hagberg; 37 Alan Miller; 22 Larry Todd; Wide receivers (WR): 14 Fred Biletnikoff; 21 Gene Mingo K; 84 Art Powell; Tight ends (TE): 33 Billy Cannon; 86 Ken Herock	Offensive linemen (OL): 65 Wayne Hawkins G; 67 Bob Mischak G; 00 Jim Otto C; 75 Ken Rice G; 79 Harry Schuh T; 76 Bob Svihus T; 74 Rich Zecher G/T; Defensive linemen (DL): 53 Dan Birdwell DT; 46 Dave Costa DT; 83 Ben Davidson DE; 73 John Diehl DT; 77 Ike Lassiter DE; 87 Rex Mirich DT/DE; 85 Carleton Oats DT/DE	Linebackers (LB): 48 Bill Budness MLB; 60 Dan Conners OLB; 49 Dick Hermann OLB; 34 Gus Otto OLB; 56 Archie Matsos MLB; 52 J. R. Williamson OLB; Defensive backs (DB): 25 Claude Gibson CB/S; 45 Dave Grayson CB; 27 Joe Krakoski SS; 47 Kent McCloughan CB; 20 Warren Powers SS; 29 Howie Williams FS; Special teams (ST): 10 Mike Mercer K/P	Practice squad: 32 Rich Jackson DE; 68 Marv Marinovich G; Reserve: 39 Pervis Atkins TE (IR); 19 Cotton Davidson QB (IR); 78 Frank Youso T (IR); Rookies in italics

1965 Oakland Raiders Draft
Round	Selection	Player	Position	College
1	3	Harry Schuh	T	
2	11	Fred Biletnikoff	WR	Florida State
3	19	Bob Svihus	T	
4	27	Gus Otto	LB	
9	67	Rich Zecher	DT	

== Season ==
=== Regular season ===
Week	Date	Opponent	Result	Record	Venue	Attendance	Recap
1	September 12	**Kansas City Chiefs**	**W** 37–10	1–0	Frank Youell Field	18,569	Recap
2	September 19	**San Diego Chargers**	**L** 6–17	1–1	Frank Youell Field	21,406	Recap
3	September 26	Houston Oilers	**W** 21–17	2–1	Frank Youell Field	18,116	Recap
4	October 3	at Buffalo Bills	**L** 12–17	2–2	War Memorial Stadium	41,246	Recap
5	October 8	at Boston Patriots	**W** 24–10	3–2	Fenway Park	24,824	Recap
6	October 16	at New York Jets	**T** 24–24	3–2–1	Shea Stadium	54,890	Recap
7	October 24	Boston Patriots	**W** 30–21	4–2–1	Frank Youell Field	20,585	Recap
8	October 31	at **Kansas City Chiefs**	**L** 7–14	4–3–1	Municipal Stadium	18,354	Recap
9	November 7	at Houston Oilers	**W** 33–21	5–3–1	Rice Stadium	35,729	Recap
10	November 14	Buffalo Bills	**L** 14–17	5–4–1	Frank Youell Field	19,352	Recap
11	November 21	at **Denver Broncos**	**W** 28–20	6–4–1	Bears Stadium	30,369	Recap
12	Bye						
13	December 5	**Denver Broncos**	**W** 24–13	7–4–1	Frank Youell Field	19,023	Recap
14	December 12	New York Jets	**W** 24–14	8–4–1	Frank Youell Field	19,013	Recap
15	December 19	at **San Diego Chargers**	**L** 14–24	8–5–1	Balboa Stadium	26,056	Recap
Note: Intra-division opponents are in **bold** text.

=== Game summaries ===
==== Week 1 ====
Team	1	2	3	4	Total
Chiefs	7	0	3	0	10
• Raiders	0	10	10	17	37

- Date: September 12
- Location: Frank Youell Field, Oakland, California
- Game weather: 61 °F (16 °C), wind 8 mph (13 km/h)

Scoring summary
1	KC	Curtis McClinton 20 yard pass from Len Dawson (Tommy Brooker kick)	Chiefs 7–0
2	OAK	Art Powell 14 yard pass from Dick Wood (Mike Mercer kick)	Tie 7–7
2	OAK	Gene Mingo 40 yard field goal	Raiders 10–7
3	OAK	Gene Mingo 28 yard field goal	Raiders 13–7
3	KC	Tommy Brooker 34 yard field goal	Raiders 13–10
3	OAK	Art Powell 5 yard pass from Dick Wood (Mike Mercer kick)	Raiders 20–10
4	OAK	Gene Mingo 28 yard field goal	Raiders 23–10
4	OAK	Dick Wood 3 yard run (Mike Mercer kick)	Raiders 30–10
4	OAK	Claude Gibson 58 yard punt return (Mike Mercer kick)	Raiders 37–10

== Standings ==
AFL Western Division
	W	L	T	PCT	DIV	PF	PA	STK
San Diego Chargers	9	2	3	.818	4–1–1	340	227	W3
Oakland Raiders	8	5	1	.615	3–3	298	239	L1
Kansas City Chiefs	7	5	2	.583	4–1–1	322	285	W1
Denver Broncos	4	10	0	.286	0–6	303	392	L4

Note: Tie games were not officially counted in the standings in the AFL.
