= Kenny Graham (American football) =

American football player (1941–2023)

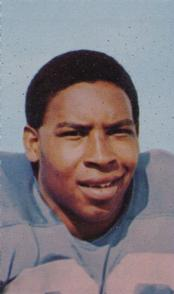
- Graham c. 1969

No. 33, 24
- Position: Safety

Personal information
- Born: November 25, 1941; Texarkana, Texas, U.S.
- Died: December 11, 2023 (aged 82); Bakersfield, California, U.S.
- Listed height: 6 ft 0 in (1.83 m)
- Listed weight: 210 lb (95 kg)

Career information
- High school: Santa Monica (Santa Monica, California)
- College: Washington State (1960–1963)
- NFL draft: 1964: 12th round, 162nd overall pick
- AFL draft: 1964: 13th round, 104th overall pick

Career history
- San Diego Chargers (1964-1969); Cincinnati Bengals (1970); Pittsburgh Steelers (1970)

Awards and highlights
- 3× First-team All-AFL (1966-1968); 2× Second-team All-AFL (1965, 1969); 4× AFL All-Star (1965, 1967, 1968, 1969); AFL All-Time Second Team

Career NFL/AFL statistics
- Interceptions: 28
- Fumble recoveries: 5
- Total touchdowns: 5
- Stats at Pro Football Reference

James Kenneth Harold Graham (November 25, 1941 – December 11, 2023) was an American professional football player who was a safety for seven seasons with the American Football League (AFL)'s San Diego Chargers and with the National Football League (NFL)'s Cincinnati Bengals and Pittsburgh Steelers. Graham was an AFL All-Star in 1965, 1967, 1968 and 1969.

Graham died on December 11, 2023, at the age of 82.

== See also ==
- List of American Football League players
