= Herb Travenio =

American football player (1933–2024)

No. 35
- Position: Placekicker/Linebacker

Personal information
- Born: February 28, 1933; Dallas, Texas, U.S.
- Died: March 24, 2024 (aged 91)
- Listed height: 6 ft 1 in (1.85 m)
- Listed weight: 218 lb (99 kg)

Career information
- College: None

Career history
- San Diego Chargers (1964–1965)

Career statistics
- Games played: 17
- Stats at Pro Football Reference

Herbert Charles Travenio (February 28, 1933 – March 24, 2024) was an American football player who played for San Diego Chargers of the American Football League (AFL).

Travenio did not attend college, instead serving in the United States Marine Corps during the Vietnam War. He played football at Marine Corps Recruit Depot San Diego and was a member of their 1963 team that went 12–0 and played the Quantico Marines Devil Dogs football team in the Missile Bowl. After leaving the military, Travenio got a job in the San Diego post office. In 1964, he joined the San Diego Chargers as a 33-year-old rookie. He appeared in three games, making 2 of 5 field goals and 10 of 12 extra points. He was released and returned to the post office, but rejoined the Chargers in 1965 due to injuries to their kickers. He finished the year 18 of 30 on field goal attempts and 40 for 40 on extra points.
