= Ernie Wright =

American football player (1939–2007)

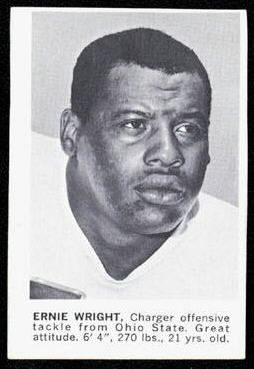

No. 75, 79
- Position: Offensive tackle

Personal information
- Born: November 6, 1939; Toledo, Ohio, U.S.
- Died: March 20, 2007 (aged 67); San Diego, California, U.S.
- Listed height: 6 ft 4 in (1.93 m)
- Listed weight: 270 lb (122 kg)

Career information
- High school: Scott (Toledo)
- College: Ohio State
- NFL draft: 1961: 15th round, 200th overall pick

Career history

Playing
- Los Angeles/San Diego Chargers (1960–1967); Cincinnati Bengals (1968–1971); San Diego Chargers (1972)

Coaching
- Philadelphia Bell (1974) Offensive line coach

Awards and highlights
- AFL champion (1963); 2× Second-team All-AFL (1960, 1961); 3× AFL All-Star (1961, 1963, 1965); San Diego Chargers 50th Anniversary Team

Career NFL/AFl statistics
- Games played: 174
- Games started: 153
- Fumble recoveries: 1
- Stats at Pro Football Reference

Ernest Henry Wright (November 6, 1939 – March 20, 2007) was an American professional football player who was an offensive tackle for 13 seasons, from 1960 to 1969 in the American Football League (AFL), and from 1970 to 1972 in the National Football League (NFL).

== Early life ==
Wright was born on November 6, 1939, in Toledo, Ohio and attended Scott High School. He played football for Ohio State University and started on the Buckeyes' offensive line in 1958 and 1959.

== Professional career ==
Wright was an original member of the Los Angeles Chargers of the American Football League in 1960. He was drafted in the 15th round (200th overall) of the 1961 NFL Draft by the Los Angeles Rams, but he remained with the Chargers.

Wright was a starter for the Chargers in their 51–10 victory over the Boston Patriots in the 1963 AFL Championship game.

He was an AFL All-Star in 1961, 1963 and 1965. Chargers Hall of Fame coach Sid Gillman called the tandem of Wright and Hall-of-Famer Ron Mix "The best pair of offensive tackles in pro football."

He played eight seasons for the Chargers, through the 1967 season. He played the next four seasons with the Cincinnati Bengals, including in their inaugural season of 1968. In 1968 and 1969, the Bengals were in the AFL; in 1970, they moved to the NFL as the two leagues merged. He returned to the Chargers to finish his career in 1972.

Wright was one of only 20 men who played all 10 years of the AFL's existence.

== Personal life ==
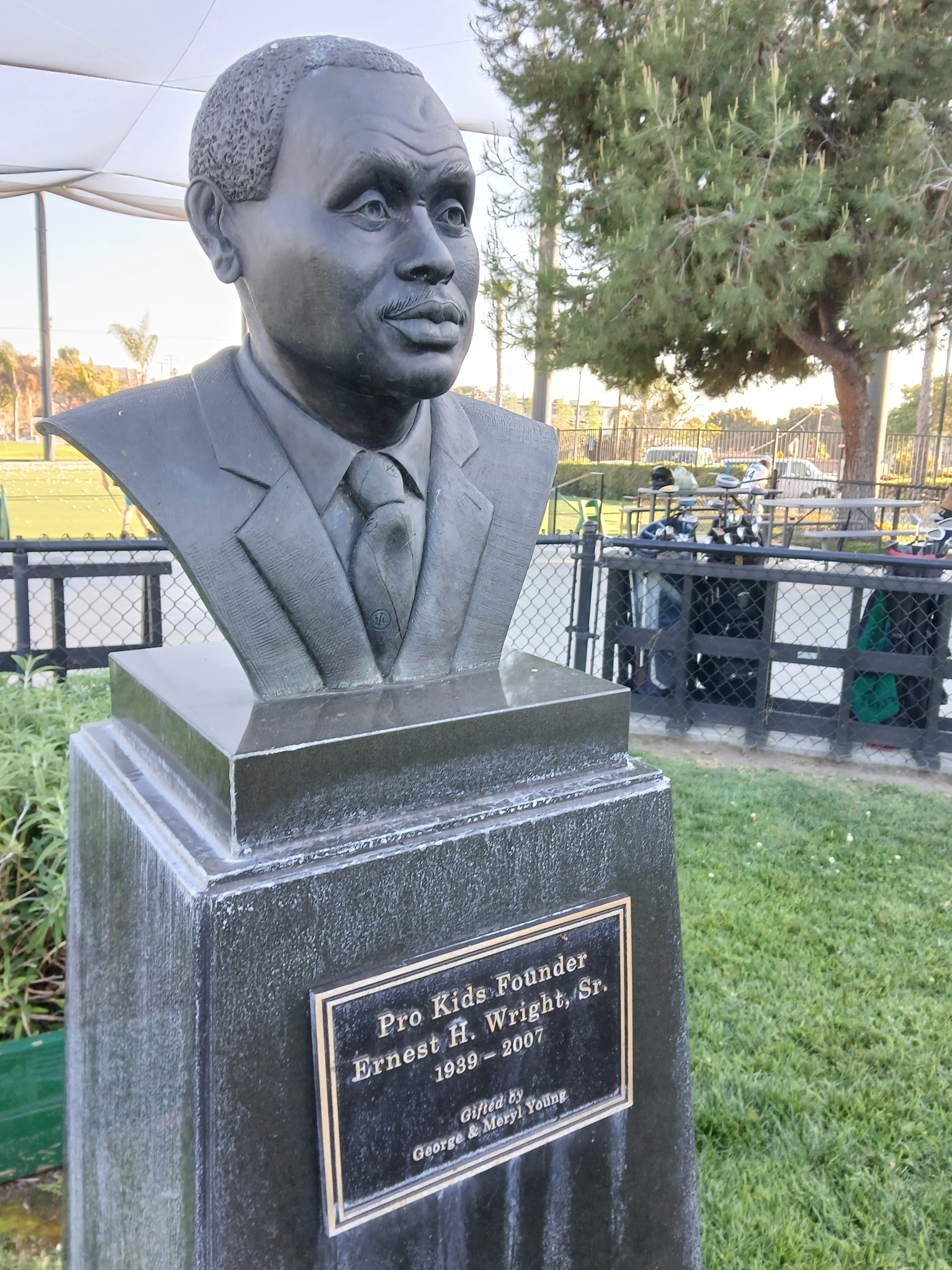
Ernest H. Wright, Sr. bust; Founder of Pro Kids Golf Academy San Diego

In 1994, Wright founded The Pro Kids Golf Academy and Learning Center, a nonprofit organization aimed at providing inner-city youth in San Diego with access to golf and life skills development. One of the program's notable alum is Norman Xiong. The organization operates at the Colina Park Golf Course and expanded in 2012 with the construction of the Ely Callaway Golf & Learning Center in Oceanside, funded by a $2 million donation from Callaway Golf. The facility includes classrooms, a library, and a golf simulator.

Wright was the first winner of the Ernie H. Wright Humanitarian Award, which the San Diego Hall of Champions had established in his honor. The award was presented to Wright during the hall's awards banquet in 2007.

He became a sports talent agent and later became the western regional chief for the NFL Players Association. He later operated a series of installations for people convicted of misdemeanors.

Wright died of cancer in 2007.

== See also ==
- List of American Football League players
