= Frank Buncom =

American football player (1939–1969)

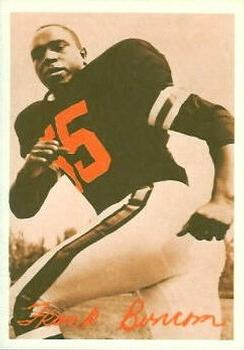

No. 55
- Position: Linebacker

Personal information
- Born: November 2, 1939; Shreveport, Louisiana, U.S.
- Died: September 15, 1969 (aged 29); Cincinnati, Ohio, U.S.
- Listed height: 6 ft 2 in (1.88 m)
- Listed weight: 235 lb (107 kg)

Career information
- High school: Dorsey (Los Angeles, California)
- College: East Los Angeles (1958–1959); USC (1960–1961)
- AFL draft: 1962: 6th round, 48th overall pick

Career history
- San Diego Chargers (1962–1967); Cincinnati Bengals (1968)

Awards and highlights
- AFL champion (1963); 3× AFL All-Star (1964, 1965, 1967); 4× Second-team All-AFL (1964–1967); Los Angeles Chargers Hall of Fame; First-team All-PCC (1961)

Career statistics
- Games played-started: 96-42
- Interceptions: 5
- Fumble recoveries: 2
- Stats at Pro Football Reference

Frank James Buncom Jr. (November 2, 1939 – September 15, 1969) was an American professional football player who was a linebacker in the American Football League (AFL). He played most of his career with the San Diego Chargers and is member of the Chargers Hall of Fame.

== College career ==
After graduating from Dorsey High School in Los Angeles, Buncom attended junior college at East Los Angeles College. He then played college football at the University of Southern California, where he lettered in the 1960 and 1961 seasons.

== Professional career ==
Buncom played for seven seasons in the AFL with the San Diego Chargers (1962-1967) and the Cincinnati Bengals (1968).

He was a three-time AFL All-Star, in 1964, 1965, and 1967.

He was chosen by the Bengals in the 1968 AFL allocation draft for the expansion Bengals. He was a starting outside linebacker for the Bengals during their first-ever season.

== Death and legacy ==
Buncom was slated to be a starter for the 1969 Bengals. On the morning of the Bengals' opening game of the 1969 regular season, on September 14, his roommate, Ernie Wright, was awakened by the sound of Buncom calling for him and gasping for air. Neither Wright nor paramedics could save him. He was 29. The cause of death was determined to be a pulmonary embolism.

He was survived by his wife Sarah, later a principal in the San Diego Unified School District, and seven-week-old son, Frank James Buncom III. His former team, the Chargers, as well as the Bengals, established trust funds for Buncom's son.

When the San Diego Chargers announced their inaugural hall of fame class in 1976, Buncom was one of the four inductees.

Ron Mix, a San Diego attorney and former teammate of Buncom's, said, "I remember Frank as being the best of us, and I'm talking about as a person with high character."

His grandson, Frank Buncom IV, attended St. Augustine High School, where he was an outstanding defensive back as of 2014 being recruited by many Division I programs. On January 28, 2015, he signed to play at Stanford University.

== See also ==
- List of American Football League players
- List of gridiron football players who died during their careers
