= Tom Sestak =

American football player (1936–1987)

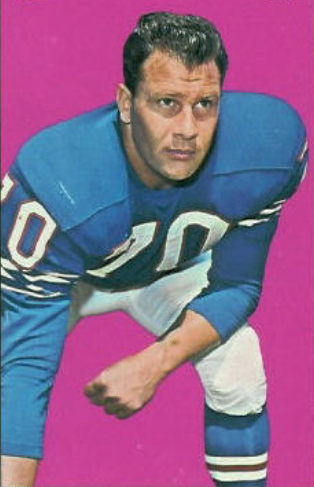
- Sestak on a Topps card, 1965

No. 70
- Position: Defensive tackle

Personal information
- Born: March 9, 1936; Gonzales, Texas, U.S.
- Died: April 3, 1987 (aged 51); Buffalo, New York, U.S.
- Listed height: 6 ft 5 in (1.96 m)
- Listed weight: 267 lb (121 kg)

Career information
- High school: Gonzales
- College: McNeese State
- NFL draft: 1962: 16th round, 220th overall pick
- AFL draft: 1962: 17th round, 132nd overall pick

Career history
- Buffalo Bills (1962–1968)

Awards and highlights
- 2× AFL champion (1964, 1965); 3× First-team All-AFL (1963–1965); Second-team All-AFL (1962); 4× AFL All-Star (1962–1965); AFL sacks leader (1964); AFL All-Time Team; Buffalo Bills Wall of Fame; Buffalo Bills 50th Anniversary Team

Career AFL statistics
- Sacks: 52
- Fumble recoveries: 2
- Interceptions: 2
- Defensive touchdowns: 3
- Stats at Pro Football Reference

Thomas Joseph Sestak (March 9, 1936 – April 3, 1987) was an American football defensive tackle who played for the Buffalo Bills of the American Football League (AFL). He played college football for the McNeese State Cowboys. He was named to the AFL All-Time Team.

== Early life ==
Sestak was born in Gonzales, Texas. He had mixed European heritage, with his grandparents on his father's side being from Czechoslovakia while his grandparents on his mother's side being from Poland. Alongside his two brothers, he played in numerous sports as a child, such as football and track. He played tight end in the collegiate ranks at McNeese State University in Lake Charles, Louisiana.

== Career ==
His talents led to him being drafted in the 17th round of the AFL draft by the Buffalo Bills in 1962. He was also drafted by the Detroit Lions in the sixteenth round of the NFL draft that year. He was an example of a trend of the young league to draft players from small colleges, which was deemed innovative in part due to its results that it cultivated, which Sestak represented well. He was to play defensive lineman for the Bills, owing to his 6-4 size, speed, and strength.

Sestak was a starter in his rookie year and, until a series of knee injuries ended his career after the 1967 season, used his strength to dominate the line of scrimmage. Sestak was a three-time selection to All-American Football League teams and a unanimous All-AFL defensive tackle in three consecutive years; 1963, 1964 and 1965. Sestak served as the cornerstone of a defense that took the Bills to the playoffs four straight years (1963–1966) and consecutive AFL championships in 1964 and 1965. Over the 1964 and 1965 seasons, Sestak and his defense mates held opposing rushers without a touchdown for seventeen consecutive games, a Professional Football record that still stands. Twice during his outstanding career he realized the defensive lineman's "dream", returning interceptions for touchdowns, and once returned a recovered fumble for a score.

His teammates described his play as "crazy as hell". He notably played a season with three broken ribs, and his knees problems meant that he spent time at a stationary bicycle instead of scrimmage during practice.

During the 1960s, only six professional defensive linemen were unanimous All-League selections for three or more years, Sestak (3), Bob Lily (5), Merlin Olsen (4), Willie Davis (3), Gino Marchetti (3), and Deacon Jones (3). The latter five, all former NFL players, have already been inducted into the Pro Football Hall of Fame, while Sestak, a star from the AFL, like many other AFL players has been ignored by the Hall of Fame selectors. He was named to the First Team for his position at defensive tackle, along with Houston Antwine. In contrast, Buck Buchanan (a Second Team selection) is a Hall of Famer while Sestak is not.

In January 1970, Sestak was selected as a member of the All-Time All-AFL Team, and in 2009 as a member of the Bills' 50th Anniversary Team. In 2007, Tom Sestak was inducted into the National Polish American Sports Hall of Fame. In 2011, the Professional Football Researchers Association named Sestak to the PRFA Hall of Very Good Class of 2011 In 2019, despite not being in the Pro Football Hall of Fame, he was chosen as a finalist for the NFL's 100th Anniversary Team

Sestak died of a heart attack in 1987.

== See also ==
- List of American Football League players
