= Don Breaux =

American football player and coach (born 1940)

No. 19, 15
- Position: Quarterback

Personal information
- Born: August 3, 1940 (age 86); Jennings, Louisiana, U.S.
- Listed height: 6 ft 1 in (1.85 m)
- Listed weight: 205 lb (93 kg)

Career information
- High school: Lake Charles (LA) LaGrange
- College: McNeese State
- NFL draft: 1963: undrafted

Career history

Playing
- Denver Broncos (1963); San Diego Chargers (1964–1965)

Coaching
- Florida State (1966–1967) (assistant); Arkansas (1968–1971) (backfield); Houston Oilers (1972) (OC); Florida (1973–1974) (QB/WR); Texas (1975–1976) (co-OC); Arkansas (1977–1980) (offensive backfield); Washington Redskins (1981–1989) (RB); Washington Redskins (1990–1993) (OC); New York Jets (1994) (TE); Carolina Panthers (1995–2002) (TE); Washington Redskins (2004–2007) (OC)

Awards and highlights
- 3× Super Bowl champion (XVII, XXII, XXVI)

Career NFL statistics
- Passing attempts: 181
- Passing completions: 92
- Completion percentage: 50.8%
- TD–INT: 9–10
- Passing yards: 1,339
- Passer rating: 68.8
- Stats at Pro Football Reference
- Coaching profile at Pro Football Reference

Donald Carl Breaux (born August 3, 1940) is an American former professional football player and coach. He played college football at McNeese State College and in the American Football League (AFL). He served two stints as an assistant coach under head coach Joe Gibbs with the Washington Redskins of the National Football League (NFL).

== Playing career ==
Breaux attended McNeese State University and was a standout quarterback. He led the team in passing all four years from 1958 to 1961, was a three time All-Gulf States Conference selection, led the league in total offense in 1960, and was the team's MVP in 1961 when they won the conference championship. In four seasons, he compiled 159 completions on 304 attempts for 2,279 yards and 17 touchdowns. He was inducted into the McNeese State Hall of Fame in 1984.

He played professionally in the AFL for the Denver Broncos in 1963, where he was one of four quarterbacks and lost both his starts. He compiled 70 completions on 138 attempts for 935 yards, 7 touchdowns, and 6 interceptions; in a Nov 3 loss to Buffalo, he had 239 yards and 4 touchdowns which remains tied for the Broncos rookie record. He also appeared in seven games for the San Diego Chargers in 1965, though he only reached 10 attempts in two of them, and logged two touchdowns to four interceptions on the season.

== Coaching career ==
Breaux was an assistant coach at Florida State from 1966 to 1967, where he worked with Joe Gibbs under Bill Peterson, men who would have a major impact on the rest of his career. Peterson had attended Chargers training camp to develop an advanced pass system, and hired Breaux as a natural fit. Gibbs and Breaux reunited in 1971 at Arkansas, where they became close friends after Breaux's "dramatic spiritual redirection." He was hired to his first NFL coaching job with the Houston Oilers in 1972, once again under their new coach Bill Peterson. He remained a professional coach for 27 years. Breaux is most remembered for his 17 seasons in two stints under Joe Gibbs, from 1981 to 1993 and again as offensive coordinator from 2004 to 2007. Gibbs credits Breaux with inventing the H-back position, revolutionizing the passing game, and being an instrumental part of three Washington Redskins Super Bowl victories. Gibbs described Breaux as a born coach, and Breaux once said "I don't recall ever wanting to do anything else." Between jobs with Gibbs, Breaux was on the coaching staff of the New York Jets in 1994, and Carolina Panthers from 1995 to 2002.

== See also ==
- List of American Football League players
