= 1965 Houston Oilers season =

NFL team season

- Owner: Bud Adams
- General manager: Carroll Martin
- Head coach: Hugh Taylor
- Home stadium: Rice Stadium

Results
- Record: 4–10
- Division place: 4th AFL Eastern
- Playoffs: Did not qualify

The 1965 Houston Oilers season was the sixth season for the Houston Oilers as a professional AFL franchise; The team matched their previous output of 4–10 and failed to qualify for the playoffs for the third consecutive season. The Oilers moved their home games from Jeppensen Stadium to Rice Stadium.

The 1965 Oilers surrendered 5.29 rushing yards per carry, the most in American Football League history, and 8th-most in the history of professional football.

== Roster ==
1965 Houston Oilers roster
Quarterbacks (QB): 16 George Blanda K; 10 Don Trull; Running backs (RB): 25 Ode Burrell; 46 Bob Jackson; 30 Jack Spikes; Wide receivers (WR): 20 Dick Compton; 87 Charley Hennigan; 41 Keith Kinderman; Tight ends (TE): 83 Willie Frazier; 81 Bob McLeod	Offensive linemen (OL): 66 Sonny Bishop G; 73 Norm Evans T; 56 Wayne Frazier C; 77 Rich Michael T; 76 Walter Suggs T; 61 Bob Talamini G; 78 Maxie Williams G/T; 67 John Wittenborn G; Defensive linemen (DL): 70 Scott Appleton DT; 80 Gary Cutsinger DE; 88 Bob Evans DE; 75 Don Floyd DE; 62 Jim Hayes DE/DT; 82 Ed Husmann DT; 64 Bud McFadin DT; 74 Art Strahan DE/DT	Linebackers (LB): 85 Danny Brabham OLB; 31 Doug Cline MLB; 68 Tom Goode MLB; 50 Bobby Maples OLB; 30 Charlie Rieves OLB; Defensive backs (DB): 40 Tony Banfield CB; 27 Fred Glick FS; 33 W. K. Hicks CB; 23 Bobby Jancik FS; 47 Pete Jaquess CB; 43 Jim Norton SS/P; 45 Larry Onesti SS; Special teams (ST)	Reserve: 84 Johnny Baker LB (IR); 42 Sid Blanks RB (IR); 26 Larry Elkins WR (IR); 55 John Frongillo C (IR); 28 Charley Frazier WR (IR); 89 George Kinney DE (IR); 44 Charley Tolar RB (IR); 20 Sammy Weir WR (IR); Rookies in italics

== Schedule ==
Week	Date	Opponent	Result	Record	Venue	Attendance	Recap
1	September 12	**New York Jets**	**W** 27–21	1–0	Rice Stadium	52,680	Recap
2	September 19	**Boston Patriots**	**W** 31–10	2–0	Rice Stadium	32,445	Recap
3	September 26	at Oakland Raiders	**L** 17–21	2–1	Frank Youell Field	18,166	Recap
4	October 3	at San Diego Chargers	**L** 14–31	2–2	Balboa Stadium	28,190	Recap
5	Bye						
6	October 17	at Denver Broncos	**L** 17–28	2–3	Bears Stadium	32,492	Recap
7	October 24	Kansas City Chiefs	**W** 38–36	3–3	Rice Stadium	34,670	Recap
8	October 31	at **Buffalo Bills**	**W** 19–17	4–3	War Memorial Stadium	44,267	Recap
9	November 7	Oakland Raiders	**L** 21–33	4–4	Rice Stadium	35,729	Recap
10	November 14	Denver Broncos	**L** 21–31	4–5	Rice Stadium	28,126	Recap
11	November 21	at **New York Jets**	**L** 14–41	4–6	Shea Stadium	55,312	Recap
12	November 28	at Kansas City Chiefs	**L** 21–52	4–7	Municipal Stadium	16,459	Recap
13	December 5	**Buffalo Bills**	**L** 18–29	4–8	Rice Stadium	23,087	Recap
14	December 12	San Diego Chargers	**L** 26–37	4–9	Rice Stadium	24,120	Recap
15	December 18	at **Boston Patriots**	**L** 14–42	4–10	Fenway Park	14,508	Recap
Note: Intra-division opponents are in **bold** text.

== Standings ==
AFL Eastern Division
	W	L	T	PCT	DIV	PF	PA	STK
Buffalo Bills	10	3	1	.769	4–2	313	226	L1
New York Jets	5	8	1	.385	3–3	285	303	W1
Boston Patriots	4	8	2	.333	2–4	244	302	W3
Houston Oilers	4	10	0	.286	3–3	298	429	L7

Note: Tie games were not officially counted in the standings in the AFL.
