= 1965 American Football League season =

American Football League season

1965 AFL season

Regular season
- Duration: September 11 – December 19, 1965

Playoffs
- Date: December 26, 1965
- Eastern champion: Buffalo Bills
- Western champion: San Diego Chargers
- Site: Balboa Stadium, San Diego, California
- Champion: Buffalo Bills

AFL teams: West, East

The 1965 AFL season was the sixth regular season of the American Football League.

The season also saw a change of television address as the games moved from ABC to NBC.

The season ended when the Buffalo Bills defeated the San Diego Chargers in the AFL Championship game. The next season, the AFL would join the NFL to form the AFL-NFL World Championship game, known today as the Super Bowl.

== Division races ==
The AFL had 8 teams, grouped into two divisions. Each team would play a home-and-away game against the other 7 teams in the league for a total of 14 games, and the best team in the Eastern Division would play against the best in the Western Division in a championship game. If there was a tie in the standings at top of either division, a one-game playoff would be held to determine the division winner.

There was little drama in either of the AFL's division races in 1965. The Bills led the Eastern Division from start to finish, ending five games ahead of the 5–8–1 Jets. In the Western Division, San Diego had three potential wins cancelled out when they were tied by Kansas City (10–10), Boston (13–13) and Buffalo (20–20), but their 9–2–3 finish (.818) was well ahead of Oakland's 8–5–1 record (.615).

Week	Eastern		Western	
1	Tie (Buf, Hou)	1–0–0	Tie (Oak, SD)	1–0–0
2	Tie (Buf, Hou)	2–0–0	San Diego	2–0–0
3	Buffalo	3–0–0	San Diego	2–0–1
4	Buffalo	4–0–0	San Diego	3–0–1
5	Buffalo	4–1–0	San Diego	4–0–1
6	Buffalo	5–1–0	San Diego	4–0–2
7	Buffalo	6–1–0	San Diego	5–0–2
8	Buffalo	6–2–0	San Diego	5–1–2
9	Buffalo	7–2–0	San Diego	6–1–2
10	Buffalo	8–2–0	San Diego	6–2–2
11	Buffalo	8–2–0	San Diego	6–2–2
12	Buffalo	8–2–1	San Diego	6–2–3
13	Buffalo	9–2–1	San Diego	7–2–3
14	Buffalo	10–2–1	San Diego	8–2–3
15	Buffalo	10–3–1	San Diego	9–2–3

== Regular season ==
=== Results ===
Home/Road		Eastern Division				Western Division			
Home/Road		BOS	BUF	HOU	NY	DEN	KC	OAK	SD
Eastern	Boston Patriots		7–23	42–14	20–30	10–27	10–10	10–24	13–13
Eastern	Buffalo Bills	24–7		17–19	33–21	31–13	34–25	17–12	3–34
Eastern	Houston Oilers	31–10	18–29		27–21	21–31	38–36	21–33	26–37
Eastern	New York Jets	23–27	14–12	41–14		45–10	10–14	24–24	9–34
Western	Denver Broncos	20–28	15–30	28–17	16–13		23–31	20–28	21–35
Western	Kansas City Chiefs	27–17	7–23	52–21	10–13	45–35		14–7	31–7
Western	Oakland Raiders	30–21	14–17	21–17	24–14	24–13	37–10		6–17
Western	San Diego Chargers	6–22	20–20	31–14	38–7	34–31	10–10	24–14	

=== Standings ===
AFL Eastern Division
	W	L	T	PCT	DIV	PF	PA	STK
Buffalo Bills	10	3	1	.769	4–2	313	226	L1
New York Jets	5	8	1	.385	3–3	285	303	W1
Boston Patriots	4	8	2	.333	2–4	244	302	W3
Houston Oilers	4	10	0	.286	3–3	298	429	L7

Note: Tie games were not officially counted in the standings in the AFL.

AFL Western Division
	W	L	T	PCT	DIV	PF	PA	STK
San Diego Chargers	9	2	3	.818	4–1–1	340	227	W3
Oakland Raiders	8	5	1	.615	3–3	298	239	L1
Kansas City Chiefs	7	5	2	.583	4–1–1	322	285	W1
Denver Broncos	4	10	0	.286	0–6	303	392	L4

== Playoffs ==
AFL Championship Game
December 26, 1965 – Balboa Stadium
Buffalo Bills	23
San Diego Chargers	0

== Stadium changes ==
- The Houston Oilers moved from Jeppensen Stadium to Rice Stadium

== Coaching changes ==
- Denver Broncos: Mac Speedie began his first full season. He replaced Jack Faulkner after four games into the 1964 season.
- Houston Oilers: Sammy Baugh was fired and replaced by Hugh Taylor.

== See also ==
- 1965 NFL season
