= Art Powell (wide receiver) =

American football player (1937–2015)

- Powell in 1960 posing at the Polo Grounds

No. 75, 76, 87, 84, 24
- Positions: Wide receiver, defensive back

Personal information
- Born: February 25, 1937; Dallas, Texas, U.S.
- Died: April 6, 2015 (aged 78) near San Diego, California, U.S.
- Listed height: 6 ft 3 in (1.91 m)
- Listed weight: 211 lb (96 kg)

Career information
- High school: San Diego
- College: San Jose State (1953–1956)
- NFL draft: 1959: 11th round, 123rd overall pick

Career history
- Toronto Argonauts (1957); Montreal Alouettes (1957); Philadelphia Eagles (1959); New York Titans (1960–1962); Oakland Raiders (1963–1966); Buffalo Bills (1967); Minnesota Vikings (1968)

Awards and highlights
- 2× First-team All-AFL (1960, 1963); 4× Second-team All-AFL (1962, 1964, 1965, 1966); 4× AFL All-Star (1963–1966); 2× AFL receiving yards leader (1962, 1963); 2× AFL receiving touchdowns leader (1960, 1963); All-Time All-AFL Team

Career NFL/AFL statistics
- Receptions: 479
- Receiving yards: 8,046
- Receiving touchdowns: 81
- Stats at Pro Football Reference

Arthur Louis Powell (February 25, 1937 – April 6, 2015) was an American professional football player who was a wide receiver in the Canadian Football League (CFL), the National Football League (NFL) and the American Football League (AFL). An outspoken receiver that was noted at the time for his stances against segregation in football (which saw him protest several times over segregated housing for football players), Powell was best known for his play with the Oakland Raiders, where he had 50 of his 81 receiving touchdowns with. With five 1,000-yard seasons and five seasons with 10+ touchdowns, Powell was one of just three players with 80 receiving touchdowns in pro football history, and he earned All-AFL honors (first/second) six times to go along with four AFL All-Star selections. Injuries saw the end of his career in 1968 that saw him retire at the age of 31. For his contributions as one of the top receivers in AFL history, Powell was named to the second team of the American Football League All-Time Team in 1970.

== Early life and college ==
Powell attended and played high school football at San Diego High School and played college football at San Jose State University. His brother, Charlie Powell, was also a professional football player.

== Professional career ==
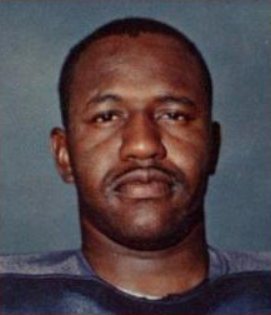
Powell in 1963

Powell played for the Montreal Alouettes and Toronto Argonauts of the Canadian Football League in 1957 and 1958. Powell played in the American Football League (AFL) for the New York Titans, Oakland Raiders, and the Buffalo Bills. He also played in the National Football League (NFL) for the Philadelphia Eagles and Minnesota Vikings.

Powell began his American professional career after he was drafted in the 11th round by the Philadelphia Eagles. He put together an impressive rookie season in 1959, finishing second in kickoff returns with a 27-yard average while serving as a reserve defensive back. Included in those returns was a 95-yard touchdown run against the New York Giants on October 4 that jolted the defending conference champions in a 49–21 defeat. Powell refused to play in a 1960 preseason game against the Washington Redskins in Norfolk, Va., upon learning that the Eagles' black players would not be given rooms at the team's hotel. John Madden, a rookie teammate on the 1959 team, argued that the team "screwed [Powell]", as they had him return kicks and play defense to avoid him having the chance of earning incentive money as a receiver.

After being released, Powell joined the AFL's Titans in 1960, and was soon establishing his receiving credentials after a position change by Titans' head coach Sammy Baugh, scoring four touchdowns in his first contest. During the league's first three seasons, Powell teamed with Don Maynard to form the first wide receiver tandem ever to gain over 1,000 receiving yards each in receptions. In fact, the duo accomplished that feat in 1960, the first year of the AFL's existence. They repeated the feat in 1962. When the Titans faced the Houston Oilers in a 1961 preseason game in Greenville, S.C., and housed their black players at a run-down hotel in a black neighborhood, Powell again staged a one-man boycott. Possessing the size, speed and ability to make remarkable plays all over the field, Powell was one of the American Football League's first stars. With the New York Titans, Powell led the AFL in receiving touchdowns in 1960 and in receiving yards in 1962. He then led the league in both categories in 1963 after moving to the Raiders.

Despite his status as the team's leading receiver, Powell was preparing to leave for another team following the conclusion of the 1962 season due to the Titans' continuing financial troubles. In order to obtain something for him, while also alleviating the team's finances, Titan owner Harry Wismer offered him for sale on October to the highest bidder on October 19, 1962.

Oakland would be Powell's eventual destination, signing with the team on January 31, 1963. During his first year with the Raiders in 1963, the team's record improved by nine games under the leadership of new head coach Al Davis, with Powell scoring 16 touchdowns and catching 73 passes for 1,394 yards. Off the field, Powell was showing his team leadership when he, along with teammates Bo Roberson, Clem Daniels and Fred Williamson, refused to play in an exhibition game against his old team, the now rechristened New York Jets because of segregated seating in Mobile's Ladd Stadium. He was part of the 1965 American Football League All-Star game that was planned to be played in New Orleans, Louisiana before boycotts over the treatment of black players in the city led to a number of players (such as Powell) joining together in a boycott that ultimately moved the game to Houston. On December 11, 1966 versus the Denver Broncos, Powell caught two touchdown passes in a 28-10 win to become the first AFL player with five seasons of either 1,000 receiving yards or 10 touchdowns. In the five seasons of either 1,000 yards or 10 touchdowns, he had four seasons with both 1,0000 yards and 10 touchdowns; he was the first player with four 1,000-yard/10 TD seasons in pro football history.

Powell requested to be traded to Buffalo in 1967 so he could pursue business opportunities in the Toronto area (he also had apparent problems with neighbors in nearby Richmond) and Raiders owner Al Davis agreed to do so. He was traded to the Bills for Daryle Lamonica in a move that Powell later stated he regretted. Powell played in just six games for the Bills before he tore his right knee that required surgery. Buffalo released him at the end of the season. He played briefly for the Minnesota Vikings in 1968 before being placed on waivers. He never played again.

== Legacy ==
Powell finished ranked third all-time in yards gained in the AFL with 8,015, behind Don Maynard (10,289) and Lance Alworth (8,976). He was one of only three players in the history of pro football with 80 receiving touchdowns. No player had more receiving touchdowns than Powell did when he played as a receiver from 1960 to 1968. Four decades after his playing career ended, Powell remains the Raiders fifth all-time leading receiver in yardage, scoring 50 touchdowns during his four seasons with Oakland. With five seasons of over 1,000 receiving yards, he earned American Football League All-Star accolades for four straight years and was among a select group that was chosen on the All-Time All-AFL Team. The latter balloting took place in 1970 following the merger between the AFL and NFL and was selected by Hall of Fame selectors and wire services. Despite catching only 479 career passes, Powell pulled in 81 for touchdowns and he still ranks 26th all-time in career touchdown receptions, and his career touchdown rate of 16.9% (that is, the percentage of his catches that went for touchdowns) is amongst the best in history. Davis once said of Powell: “I don’t think anyone who talks about the American Football League at its beginning would not mention that Art Powell was a dominating factor. He was one of our greatest performers. His lack of longevity will always be a negative, but we’ll never forget him because he made a great contribution to the growth of the Raiders.”

Powell was named to the All-Time AFL Team in 1970. He was inducted into the Breitbard Hall of Fame in 1992. In 2019, the Professional Football Researchers Association named Powell to the PFRA Hall of Very Good Class of 2019. In August 2023, he was selected as a finalist for the Class of 2024 of the Pro Football Hall of Fame. On February 8, 2024, it was announced that Powell did not make it into the Hall of Fame, becoming the first Senior finalist since 2010 to not be elected into the Hall.

== Career statistics ==
=== Defense ===
Year	Team	Games		Interceptions					Kick returns					Punt returns				
Year	Team	GP	GS	Int	Yds	Avg	Lng	TD	Ret	Yds	Avg	Lng	TD	Ret	Yds	Avg	Lng	TD
1959	PHI	12	0	3	17	5.7	17	0	14	379	27.1	95	0	15	124	8.3	58	1

=== Receiving ===
Legend
	Led the league
**Bold**	Career high

Year	Team	Games		Receiving				
Year	Team	GP	GS	Rec	Yds	Avg	Lng	TD
1960	NYT	14	14	69	1,167	16.9	76	14
1961	NYT	14	14	71	881	12.4	48	5
1962	NYT	14	14	64	1,130	17.7	80	8
1963	OAK	14	14	73	1,304	17.9	**85**	**16**
1964	OAK	14	14	**76**	**1,361**	17.9	77	11
1965	OAK	14	14	52	800	15.4	66	12
1966	OAK	14	14	53	1,026	19.4	46	11
1967	BUF	6	6	20	346	17.3	37	4
1968	MIN	1	0	1	31	**31.0**	31	0
Career		105	104	479	8,046	16.8	85	81

== Personal life ==
While recuperating from a knee injury during his playing career, Powell had the idea for a trading stamp company, noting that collectors had to take stamps to a redemption center just to exchange them for gifts. He became president of the Black & Brown Trading Stamp Co., which issued stamps with the picture of singer (and company director) James Brown that people could purchase in order to redeem certain groceries, barbershops, gas stations, and dealerships in the San Francisco Bay area and Los Angeles; at the time of 1969, customers would get four stamps for each dollar they spent and a book of 1,200 stamps would grant them $3 of free goods/services, while merchants paid 1 1/2 cents for each four stamps. He later operated the Indo-American Oil Company in Orange County.

On April 6, 2015, Powell died at the age of 78, less than a year after the death of his older brother, Charlie. He was survived by his wife Betty and two daughters.

== See also ==
- List of American Football League players
