= Dick Hermann =

American football player (born 1942)

No. 49
- Position: Linebacker

Personal information
- Born: July 11, 1942 (age 84); Marianna, Florida
- Listed height: 6 ft 2 in (1.88 m)
- Listed weight: 215 lb (98 kg)

Career information
- High school: Marianna (FL)
- College: Florida State

Career history
- Oakland Raiders (1965)
- Stats at Pro Football Reference

Dick Hermann (born July 11, 1942) is an American former football linebacker. He played for the Oakland Raiders in 1965.
