= Ode Burrell =

American football player (1939–2009)

No. 25
- Positions: Halfback, Wide receiver, Punter

Personal information
- Born: September 15, 1939; Goodman, Mississippi, U.S.
- Died: February 28, 2009 (aged 69); Bay St. Louis, Mississippi, U.S.
- Listed height: 6 ft 0 in (1.83 m)
- Listed weight: 190 lb (86 kg)

Career information
- College: Mississippi State
- NFL draft: 1964: 3rd round, 36th overall pick
- AFL draft: 1964: 4th round, 30th overall pick

Career history
- Houston Oilers (1964-1969)

Awards and highlights
- AFL All-Star (1965); Second-team All-SEC (1963); 1963 Liberty Bowl MVP; 1964 Senior Bowl MVP; Mississippi Sports Hall of Fame (1997)

Career AFL statistics
- Rushing yards: 1,088
- Rushing average: 3.6
- Receptions: 112
- Receiving yards: 1,379
- Total touchdowns: 13
- Stats at Pro Football Reference

Ode Burrell Jr. (September 15, 1939 – February 28, 2009) was an American professional football player. A halfback, he played high school football at Durant, Mississippi college football at Mississippi State University, where he was the MVP of the Liberty Bowl and the Blue-Gray Game. He played professionally in the American Football League (AFL) for the Houston Oilers from 1964 through 1969. During his career he was a versatile player. In his best season, 1965, he rushed for 528 yards, caught 55 passes for 650 yards, and returned punts and kickoffs for an additional 241 yards. He was an American Football League All-Star in 1965. After retiring from the NFL, Burrell coached at numerous high schools including Bogalusa High School, Stone County in Wiggins, Mississippi, Vancleave High School, and St. Stanislaus High School. He also coached at two community colleges, Holmes Community College and Gulf Coast Community College. Burrell died February 28, 2009, of complications from diabetes.
