= 1965 Kansas City Chiefs season =

NFL team season

- Owner: Lamar Hunt
- General manager: Jack Steadman
- Head coach: Hank Stram
- Home stadium: Municipal Stadium

Results
- Record: 7–5–2
- Division place: 3rd AFL Western
- Playoffs: Did not qualify
- AFL All-Stars: QB Len Dawson; WR Frank Jackson; OT Jim Tyrer; FB Curtis McClinton; DE Jerry Mays; DE Buck Buchanan; LB Sherrill Headrick; LB E. J. Holub; LB Bobby Bell; S Johnny Robinson

The 1965 Kansas City Chiefs season was the sixth season for the Kansas City Chiefs as a professional AFL franchise and the third in Kansas City; they finished with a 7–5–2 record (their first winning season in Kansas City), third in the Western division.

For the 1965 season, the Chiefs were caught in the middle of the AFL and NFL's bidding wars for college talent. Kansas City made running back Gale Sayers from the University of Kansas their first-round draft pick (sixth overall), but Sayers signed with the Chicago Bears, who had selected him fourth overall in the NFL's draft.

The Chiefs lost running back Mack Lee Hill late in the year when he suffered torn ligaments in his right knee in the next-to-last regular-season game at Buffalo on December 12. Following what was expected to be a routine surgery two days later at Menorah Hospital in Kansas City, Hill died from what was termed "a sudden and massive embolism." Hunt called Hill's death "the worst shock possible." Five days after Hill's unexpected death, the mourning Chiefs defeated the Denver Broncos to finish with a 7–5–2 record.

== Roster ==
1965 Kansas City Chiefs roster
Quarterbacks: 16 Len Dawson; 10 Pete Beathard; Running Backs: 23 Bert Coan; 32 Curtis McClinton; Wide Receivers / Flankers: 88 Chris Burford; 26 Frank Jackson; 89 Otis Taylor; 26 Frank Pitts; Tight Ends: 84 Fred Arbanas; 80 Reggie Carolan	Offensive Linemen: 77 Jim Tyrer LG; 79 Jerry Cornelison T/G; 71 Ed Budde LG; 60 Al Reynolds RG; 61 Dennis Biodrowski G; 65 Jon Gilliam C; 64 Curt Merz RG; 73 Dave Hill RT; Defensive Linemen: 85 Chuck Hurston DE; 76 Hatch Rosdahl DE; 82 Ed Lothamer DE; 75 Jerry Mays DE; 86 Buck Buchanan LDT; 79 Al Dotson DT; 70 Curt Farrier DT; 87 Mel Branch RDE	Linebackers: 78 Bobby Bell OLB; 56 Walt Corey RLB; 51 Jim Fraser OLB; 69 Sherrill Headrick MLB; 35 Smokey Stover LLB; 55 E.J. Holub LLB; 69 Sherrill Headrick MLB; 50 Ronnie Caveness LB; Defensive Backs: 42 Johnny Robinson; 24 Fred Williamson CB; 38 Solomon Brannan CB; 20 Bobby Hunt SS; 22 Willie Mitchell; 14 Bobby Ply; Special Teams: 51 Tommy Brooker K; 44 Jerrel Wilson P; Rookies in italics

== Preseason ==
Week	Date	Opponent	Result	Record	Venue	Attendance	Recap
1	August 7	at Denver Broncos	W 30–24	1–0	Bears Stadium	17,707	Recap
2	August 15	San Diego Chargers	L 10–31	1–1	Municipal Stadium	13,132	Recap
3	August 22	at Oakland Raiders	L 6–23	1–2	Frank Youell Field	13,592	Recap
4	August 28	vs. Buffalo Bills	W 18–16	2–2	Veterans Field (Wichita, KS)	15,157	Recap
5	September 4	Boston Patriots	W 34–7	3–2	Municipal Stadium	15,157	Recap

== Regular season ==
=== Schedule ===
Week	Date	Opponent	Result	Record	Venue	Attendance	Recap
1	September 12	at **Oakland Raiders**	**L** 10–37	0–1	Frank Youell Field	18,659	Recap
2	September 18	at New York Jets	**W** 14–10	1–1	Shea Stadium	53,658	Recap
3	September 26	at **San Diego Chargers**	**T** 10–10	1–1–1	Balboa Stadium	28,126	Recap
4	October 3	Boston Patriots	**W** 27–17	2–1–1	Municipal Stadium	26,773	Recap
5	October 10	at **Denver Broncos**	**W** 31–23	3–1–1	Bears Stadium	31,001	Recap
6	October 17	Buffalo Bills	**L** 7–23	3–2–1	Municipal Stadium	26,941	Recap
7	October 24	at Houston Oilers	**L** 36–38	3–3–1	Rice Stadium	34,670	Recap
8	October 31	**Oakland Raiders**	**W** 14–7	4–3–1	Municipal Stadium	18,354	Recap
9	November 7	New York Jets	**L** 10–13	4–4–1	Municipal Stadium	25,523	Recap
10	November 14	**San Diego Chargers**	**W** 31–7	5–4–1	Municipal Stadium	21,968	Recap
11	November 21	at Boston Patriots	**T** 10–10	5–4–2	Fenway Park	13,056	Recap
12	November 28	Houston Oilers	**W** 52–21	6–4–2	Municipal Stadium	16,459	Recap
13	Bye						
14	December 12	at Buffalo Bills	**L** 25–34	6–5–2	War Memorial Stadium	40,298	Recap
15	December 19	**Denver Broncos**	**W** 45–35	7–5–2	Municipal Stadium	14,421	Recap
Note: Intra-division opponents are in **bold** text.

Source: Pro Football Reference

== Standings ==
AFL Western Division
	W	L	T	PCT	DIV	PF	PA	STK
San Diego Chargers	9	2	3	.818	4–1–1	340	227	W3
Oakland Raiders	8	5	1	.615	3–3	298	239	L1
Kansas City Chiefs	7	5	2	.583	4–1–1	322	285	W1
Denver Broncos	4	10	0	.286	0–6	303	392	L4

Note: Tie games were not officially counted in the standings in the AFL.
