= 1964 San Diego Chargers season =

American Football League team season

- Owner: Barron Hilton
- General manager: Sid Gillman
- Head coach: Sid Gillman
- Home stadium: Balboa Stadium

Results
- Record: 8–5–1
- Division place: 1st Western Division
- Playoffs: Lost AFL Championship (at Bills) 7–20
- All-AFL: 8: FL Lance Alworth (1st team); LB Frank Buncom (2nd team); DE Earl Faison (1st team); TE Dave Kocourek (2nd team); DT Ernie Ladd (1st team); RB Keith Lincoln (1st team); T Ron Mix (1st team); CB Dick Westmoreland (2nd team)
- AFL All-Stars: 10: LB Chuck Allen; FL Lance Alworth; LB Frank Buncom; DE Earl Faison; QB John Hadl; TE Dave Kocourek; DT Ernie Ladd; RB Keith Lincoln; T Ron Mix; G Walt Sweeney

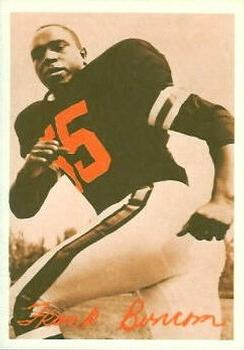
Linebacker Frank Buncom made his first All-Star game in 1964.

The 1964 San Diego Chargers season was their fifth as a professional AFL franchise; the team failed to repeat as AFL champions after winning the championship in 1963 with a record of 11–3, and finished at 8–5–1. San Diego struggled at the start and finish of the season, but a six-game winning streak in the middle proved to be enough to win the AFL West, in a league where the two strongest teams were in the Eastern division.

San Diego's defense was among the league's best, with defensive linemen Earl Faison and Ernie Ladd both voted All-AFL players, and young defensive backs Dick Westmoreland and Speedy Duncan both contributing, the latter showing ability as a kick returner. On offense, flanker Lance Alworth was the central figure, with over 1,200 receiving yards and 15 total touchdowns. Veteran quarterback Tobin Rote was phased out as the team's starter during the course of the season, replaced by third-year John Hadl. Meanwhile, former Charger quarterback Jack Kemp featured on a Buffalo Bills team that defeated San Diego three times, including in the AFL title game. Alworth missed the title game due to injury, and running back Keith Lincoln was knocked out of it in the opening quarter by Mike Stratton's "Hit Heard ‘Round the World". San Diego led 7–0 before Lincoln's injury, but failed to score afterwards and lost 20–7.

== Offseason ==
=== AFL draft ===
The 1964 AFL draft took place on November 30, 1963, late in the previous season; the Chargers had 28 picks across 26 rounds. Two days later, the rival NFL conducted their own draft.

San Diego was one of several AFL teams who had trouble signing their top picks. Of their first eleven choices, they signed only one, offensive lineman Gary Kirner, while nine spent 1964 with various NFL clubs. These included the Chargers' first four picks, who had all signed for the other league by mid-January. One of these, receiver Dave Parks, made the next three Pro Bowls for San Francisco.

Kirner went on to spend his entire six-year career in San Diego, though he only started 29 games in that time. The Chargers had a significant pick in the 13th round with safety Kenny Graham, who they signed in May. He started 11 games as a rookie and 75 in six years with the Chargers, being voted to four AFL All-Star games and one AP All-league team. He was also named to the AFL All-time second team in 1970.

1964 San Diego Chargers draft
Round	Pick	Player	Position	College	Notes
1	8	Ted Davis	Linebacker	Georgia Tech	50th pick in NFL draft; signed by Baltimore Colts
2	16	John Kirby	Linebacker	Nebraska	62nd pick in NFL draft; signed by Minnesota Vikings
3	24	Perry Lee Dunn	Running back	Mississippi	45th pick in NFL draft; signed by Dallas Cowboys
4	32	Dave Parks *	Split end	Texas Tech	1st pick in NFL draft; signed by San Francisco 49ers
5	36	Pete Goimarac	Center	West Virginia	86th pick in NFL draft
5	40	Gary Kirner	Guard	USC	
6	48	Willie Brown	Wide receiver	USC	32nd pick in NFL draft; signed by Los Angeles Rams
7	51	Roger Anderson	Defensive tackle	Virginia Union	96th pick in NFL draft; signed by New York Giants
8	56	Pat Batten	Fullback	Hardin-Simmons	30th pick in NFL draft; signed by Detroit Lions
8	64	George Seals	Guard	Missouri	52nd pick in NFL draft; signed by Washington Redskins
10	74	Bob Long	Split end	Wichita State	44th pick in NFL draft; signed by Green Bay Packers
10	80	Dick Bowman	End	Syracuse	80th pick in NFL draft; signed by Hartford Charter Oaks (ACFL)
11	88	Bob Horton	Linebacker	Boston University	168th pick in NFL draft
12	96	Ron Carpenter	Linebacker	Texas A&M	
13	104	Kenny Graham *	Defensive back	Washington State	162nd pick in NFL draft
14	112	Howard Kindig	Defensive end	Los Angeles State	170th pick in NFL draft
15	120	Ed Mitchell	Guard	Southern	166th pick in NFL draft
16	128	Bob Daugherty	Halfback	Tulsa	99th pick in NFL draft; signed by 1966 San Francisco 49ers
17	136	John Farris	Guard	San Diego State	147th pick in NFL draft
18	144	Bob Robinson	Guard	Mississippi	135th pick in NFL draft
19	152	Paul Cercel	Center	Pittsburgh	213th pick in NFL draft; signed by 1965 Philadelphia Bulldogs (COFL)
20	160	Dick Klein	Tackle	Wichita State	67th pick in NFL draft
21	168	Allen Robinson	Halfback	BYU	216th pick in NFL draft
22	176	Chuck Hinton	Center	Mississippi	208th pick in NFL draft; signed by New York Giants
23	184	Ron Smith	Quarterback	Richmond	131st pick in NFL draft; signed by 1965 Los Angeles Rams
24	192	Bill Van Burkleo	Halfback	Tulsa	Signed by 1966 Toronto Argonauts
25	200	Tommy Lucas	Guard	Mississippi	268th pick in NFL draft
26	208	Frank Kinard	Fullback	Mississippi	264th pick in NFL draft
Made roster * Made at least one AFL All-Star game or NFL Pro Bowl during career Played in the NFL in 1964

=== Departures and arrivals ===
San Diego signed defensive back / kick returner Leslie "Speedy" Duncan as an undrafted rookie. He went on to play in three AFL All-Star games in seven seasons with the Chargers, eventually being inducted into the Chargers Hall of Fame in 1995.

Guard Sam DeLuca, who had returned from retirement the previous season, was sold to the Jets on July 9 for an undisclosed sum. Paul Maguire was placed on waivers later in July. Maguire, who had doubled as a linebacker and punter since the Chargers' inaugural campaign in 1960, was claimed by the Bills. In August, fullback Bobby Jackson, who had scored nine touchdowns over the past two seasons, was sent to Oakland on a loan deal of unknown duration. In the event, he never returned to the Chargers.

George Blair, a defensive back who had led the league in field goal percentage the past two seasons, sustained a knee injury early in the season; this proved to be career-ending. Herb Travenio was brought in as a replacement, but was released after only three games. He would return the following season with more success. He was replaced by 45-year old Ben Agajanian, back with the team after four years. Agajanian, too, picked up a career-ending injury, and Keith Lincoln handled the kicking duties for the rest of the season.

== Personnel ==
=== Staff ===
1964 San Diego Chargers staff
Front office: Owner – Barron Hilton; General manager – Sid Gillman; Publicity director - Bob Burdick; Business manager - John Gough; Head coaches: Head coach – Sid Gillman; Offensive coaches: Offensive backfield coach – Tom Bass; Offensive line coach – Joe Madro	Defensive coaches: Defensive line coach – Walt Hackett; Defensive backfield coach – Chuck Noll; Strength and conditioning: Strength coach - Alvin Roy

=== Roster ===
1964 San Diego Chargers roster
Quarterbacks (QB): 18 Tobin Rote; 21 John Hadl P; Running backs (RB): 20 Gerry McDougall; 22 Keith Lincoln K; 23 Paul Lowe; 24 Keith Kinderman; Wide receivers (WR): 19 Lance Alworth; 29 Jerry Robinson; 88 Don Norton; Tight ends (TE): 38 Jacque MacKinnon; 83 Dave Kocourek	Offensive linemen (OL): 52 Don Rogers C; 61 Ernie Park T; 64 Pat Shea G; 65 Sam Gruneisen G; 72 Gary Kirner G/T; 74 Ron Mix T; 75 Ernie Wright T; 78 Walt Sweeney G; Defensive linemen (DL): 76 Henry Schmidt DT; 77 Ernie Ladd DT; 79 George Gross DT; 82 Robert Mitinger DE; 85 Bob Petrich DE/DT; 86 Earl Faison DE	Linebackers (LB): 30 Bob Horton OLB; 50 Chuck Allen MLB; 55 Frank Buncom OLB; 89 Ron Carpenter OLB; Defensive backs (DB): 25 Dick Westmoreland CB; 33 Kenny Graham SS; 45 Speedy Duncan CB; 47 Bud Whitehead FS/CB; 49 Jimmy Warren CB; Special teams (ST)	Practice squad: 28 Mario Mendez RB; 35 Herb Travenio K; 68 Lloyd McCoy G; 71 Fred Moore DT; Reserve: 3 Ben Agajanian K (IR); 27 Charlie McNeil S (IR); 36 Dick Harris S (IR); 39 George Blair (IR) S/K; 51 Wayne Frazier C (IR); 56 Emil Karas LB (IR); 57 Bobby Lane LB (IR); Rookies in italics

== Preseason ==
Lincoln, who had ended the previous season as MVP of the AFL Championship Game, began the new one by scoring the first two Chargers touchdowns of their exhibition schedule. He opened the scoring against Denver with a 13-yard catch from Tobin Rote, then put San Diego ahead to stay with a 45-yard run; Lance Alworth and Keith Kinderman added further touchdowns in a 34–20 win. The Chargers followed this with a high-scoring win over the Oilers, played on neutral ground in Little Rock, Arkansas. San Diego trailed 10–0 before Lincoln's touchdown pass to Dave Kocourek sparked a run of 30 consecutive points, with John Hadl throwing three touchdown passes. Houston came back with 21 unanswered points to lead again, and later responded after Lincoln had scored from a yard out, going ahead 38–37. Late in the game, Earl Faison recovered a fumble, and Hadl completed three passes to Alworth on a 12-play, 62-yard drive that culminated in Kinderman's game-winning 3-yard run, 72 seconds from time.

Lincoln scored again at Kansas City, where the Chargers trailed 14–12 at halftime. Rote and Don Norton combined on touchdown passes of 90 and 18 yards in the second half, giving San Diego their third consecutive win. The run came to an end in their fourth game, Paul Lowe scoring their lone touchdown in a 34–6 loss to the Jets, a game played before a sparse crowd in Atlanta. Former Charger Dick Wood threw three touchdown passes for New York. Finally, the Chargers returned home and defeated their Californian rivals Oakland 24–10. Rote and Norton once again connected for two touchdowns, either side of a Gerry McDougall run.

Week	Date	Opponent	Result	Record	Venue	Attendance
1	August 8	Denver Broncos	W 34–20	1–0	Balboa Stadium	26,293
2	August 15	vs. Houston Oilers	W 44–38	2–0	War Memorial Stadium, (Little Rock)	27,000
3	August 22	at Kansas City Chiefs	W 26–14	3–0	Municipal Stadium	28,653
4	August 29	vs. New York Jets	L 6–34	3–1	Cheney Stadium, (Atlanta)	8,200
5	September 5	Oakland Raiders	W 24–10	4–1	Balboa Stadium	16,746

== Regular season ==
=== Summary ===
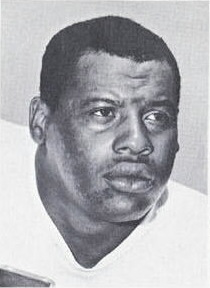
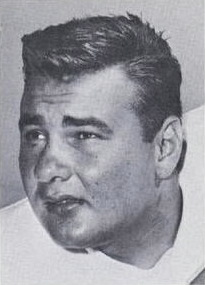
Tackle Ernie Wright (left) and center Don Rogers (right) both played in every game for the Chargers in 1964.

Rote and Hadl split time at the quarterback position, as they had done the previous year - this time, however, the younger Hadl started eight out of fourteen games, having been exclusively a replacement in 1963. Hadl finished with 2,157 yards to Rote's 1,156, and threw twice as many touchdowns (18 to 9) against the same number of interceptions (15), while posting a 6–2 record as a starter. Alworth was again the leading receiver, ranking third in the league for yardage with 1,235, and first for touchdowns (13). He also rushed for a pair of touchdowns, and averaged 10.5 yards per punt return, second best in the league. End Don Norton and tight end Kocourek added 669 and 593 receiving yards respectively. The ground attack was weakened by an early-season injury to Paul Lowe, who missed two games and finished with only 496 yards on the season. Lincoln became the leading rusher with 632 yards, but his average yards per carry slipped from 6.5 a year earlier to 4.1 in 1964.

The defense continued to be one of the league's better units, ranking 1st against the pass and 4th against the run. Defensive end Faison unofficially (Note: The NFL did not keep sack statistics officially until 1982. Members of the Professional Football Researchers Association have largely reconstructed sack data from 1960 onwards based on official gamebooks, but the NFL does not acknowledge pre-1982 sack numbers.) had a team-high 7 1/2 sacks and was a first-team All-Pro, while linebackers Chuck Allen and Frank Buncom were both voted to the AFL All-Star game, and second-year cornerback Dick Westmoreland led the team with six interceptions. The kicking game was unreliable after Blair was injured early in the season. Herb Travenio and Ben Agajanian played in three games each before Lincoln was given the job in mid-November. Collectively, the team made 12 of 26 field goal attempts, going just 5 of 17 from distances of 20 yards or more. Hadl doubled as the punter – his average of 39.5 yards per kick put him seventh out of eight in the league.

=== Schedule ===
Week	Date	Opponent	Result	Record	Venue	Attendance	Recap
1	September 12	Houston Oilers	**W** 27–21	1–0	Balboa Stadium	22,632	Recap
2	September 20	Boston Patriots	**L** 28–33	1–1	Balboa Stadium	20,568	Recap
3	September 26	at Buffalo Bills	**L** 3–30	1–2	War Memorial Stadium	40,167	Recap
4	October 3	at New York Jets	**T** 17–17	1–2–1	Shea Stadium	46,828	Recap
5	October 9	at Boston Patriots	**W** 26–17	2–2–1	Fenway Park	35,095	Recap
6	October 18	**Denver Broncos**	**W** 42–14	3–2–1	Balboa Stadium	23,332	Recap
7	October 25	at Houston Oilers	**W** 20–17	4–2–1	Jeppesen Stadium	21,671	Recap
8	November 1	**Oakland Raiders**	**W** 31–17	5–2–1	Balboa Stadium	25,557	Recap
9	November 8	at **Denver Broncos**	**W** 31–20	6–2–1	Bears Stadium	19,670	Recap
10	November 15	at **Kansas City Chiefs**	**W** 28–14	7–2–1	Municipal Stadium	19,792	Recap
11	Bye						
12	November 26	Buffalo Bills	**L** 24–27	7–3–1	Balboa Stadium	34,865	Recap
13	December 6	New York Jets	**W** 38–3	8–3–1	Balboa Stadium	25,753	Recap
14	December 13	**Kansas City Chiefs**	**L** 6–49	8–4–1	Balboa Stadium	26,562	Recap
15	December 20	at **Oakland Raiders**	**L** 20–21	8–5–1	Frank Youell Field	20,124	Recap
Note: Intra-division opponents are in **bold** text.

=== Game summaries ===
All game reports use the Pro Football Researchers' gamebook archive as a source.

==== Week 1: vs. Houston Oilers ====
Week One: Houston Oilers at San Diego Chargers – Game summary

Quarter	1	2	3	4	Total
Oilers	0	7	7	7	**21**
**Chargers**	7	0	14	6	**27**

at Balboa Stadium, San Diego, California

- Date: September 12
- Game weather: 69 °F (20.6 °C), relative humidity 81%, wind 8 mph
- Game attendance: 22,632
- Box score

Game information

**First quarter**

- SDG – Dave Kocourek 1-yard pass from Tobin Rote (George Blair kick), 2:53. Chargers 7–0. **Drive: 5 plays, 60 yards.**

**Second quarter**

- HOU – Willie Frazier 2-yard pass from George Blanda (George Blanda kick), 8:41. Tied 7–7. **Drive: 9 plays, 63 yards.**

**Third quarter**

- SDG – Gerry McDougall 2-yard run (George Blair kick), 10:15. Chargers 14–7. **Drive: 8 plays, 66 yards.**
- HOU – Bob McLeod 5-yard pass from George Blanda (George Blanda kick), 5:08. Tied 14–14. **Drive: 10 plays, 77 yards.**
- SDG – Don Norton 19-yard pass from Tobin Rote (George Blair kick), 1:39. Chargers 21–14. **Drive: 7 plays, 80 yards.**

**Fourth quarter**

- SDG – Lance Alworth 27-yard pass from Tobin Rote (kick failed), 11:50. Chargers 27–14. **Drive: 5 plays, 64 yards.**
- HOU – Bobby Jackson 1-yard run (George Blanda kick), 0:02. Chargers 27–21. **Drive: 12 plays, 74 yards.**

**Top passers**

- HOU – George Blanda – 28/47, 255 yards, 2 TD
- SDG – Tobin Rote – 15/26, 235 yards, 3 TD, INT

**Top rushers**

- HOU – Charley Tolar – 20 rushes, 67 yards
- SDG – Keith Lincoln – 10 rushes, 52 yards

**Top receivers**

- HOU – Sid Blanks – 13 receptions, 131 yards
- SDG – Lance Alworth – 6 receptions, 119 yards, TD

Rote threw three touchdowns as San Diego began their title defense with a win. Houston had the first scoring chance - they opted to fake a 33-yard field goal, but George Blanda was brought down by Westmoreland and Emil Karas for a loss of 14 yards. The Chargers responded by driving 60 yards in five plays, with Alworth catching a 31-yard pass and Rote finding Kocourek for the opening score from a yard out. Blanda responded with a touchdown pass on 4th and goal, Blair missed a 31-yard kick for San Diego, and it was 7–7 at halftime.

The first three drives of the second half resulted in touchdowns. San Diego went 66 yards in 8 plays, with Gerry MacDougall scoring from close range. After another Blanda touchdown pass, the Chargers drove 80 yards in 7 plays, with Alworth picking up two first downs, and Don Norton scoring with a 19-yard catch. After forcing a punt, the Chargers had a 5-play, 64-yard drive, Alworth scoring this time from 27 yards out. The next two Oiler drives ended with Westmoreland blocking a field goal and the San Diego defensive line stuffing a 4th and 1 attempt. By the time former Charger Bobby Jackson scored from inches out, there were only two seconds left.

Rote finished with 15 completions from 26 attempts for 235 yards, with three touchdowns and an interception. Alworth had 6 catches for 119 yards and a touchdown.

==== Week 2: vs. Boston Patriots ====
Week Two: Boston Patriots at San Diego Chargers – Game summary

Quarter	1	2	3	4	Total
**Patriots**	10	3	10	10	**33**
Chargers	0	10	0	18	**28**

at Balboa Stadium, San Diego, California

- Date: September 20
- Game weather: 65 °F (18.3 °C), relative humidity 82%, wind 9 mph
- Game attendance: 20,568
- Box score

Game information

**First quarter**

- BOS – Gino Cappelletti 17-yard pass from Babe Parilli (Gino Cappelletti kick), 11:19. Patriots 7–0. **Drive: 5 plays, 57 yards.**
- BOS – Gino Cappelletti 41-yard field goal, 2:05. Patriots 10–0. **Drive: 7 plays, 28 yards.**

**Second quarter**

- SDG – Lance Alworth 8-yard pass from Tobin Rote (George Blair kick), 2:21. Patriots 10–7. **Drive: 1 play, 8 yards.**
- BOS – Gino Cappelletti 32-yard field goal, 0:44. Patriots 13–7. **Drive: 8 plays, 25 yards.**
- SDG – George Blair 30-yard field goal, 0:06. Patriots 13–10. **Drive: 3 plays, 48 yards.**

**Third quarter**

- BOS – Gino Cappelletti 37-yard field goal, 9:38. Patriots 16–10. **Drive: 12 plays, 40 yards.**
- BOS – Art Graham 17-yard pass from Babe Parilli (Gino Cappelletti kick), 7:20. Patriots 23–10. **Drive: 3 plays, 22 yards.**

**Fourth quarter**

- SDG – Gerry McDougall 1-yard run (George Blair kick), 14:57. Patriots 23–17. **Drive: 6 plays, 14 yards.**
- BOS – Gino Cappelletti 37-yard field goal, 12:26. Patriots 26–17. **Drive: 4 plays, -5 yards.**
- BOS – Larry Garron 13-yard pass from Babe Parilli (Gino Cappelletti kick), 9:34. Patriots 33–17. **Drive: 3 plays, 26 yards.**
- SDG – Don Norton 15-yard pass from John Hadl (Gerry McDougall pass from John Hadl), 6:16. Patriots 33–25. **Drive: 10 plays, 80 yards.**
- SDG – George Blair 12-yard field goal, 2:47. Patriots 33–28. **Drive: 4 plays, 2 yards.**

**Top passers**

- BOS – Babe Parilli – 15/32, 174 yards, 3 TD
- SDG – Tobin Rote – 10/18, 175 yards, 2 TD, INT

**Top rushers**

- BOS – Larry Garron – 22 rushes, 93 yards
- SDG – Gerry McDougall – 9 rushes, 44 yards, TD

**Top receivers**

- BOS – Art Graham – 4 receptions, 51 yards, TD
- SDG – Lance Alworth – 5 receptions, 67 yards, TD

Five turnovers proved too much for the Chargers to overcome in their home opener. The first significant takeaway was by the Charger defense - down 10–0 in the 2nd quarter, the pass rush of Karas forced a fumble from Babe Parilli, which Buncom recovered at the Patriot 8-yard line. Hadl, on for a struggling Rote, hit Alworth for a touchdown on the next play. The Patriots added a field goal 44 seconds before halftime, but two 20+ yard completions by Hadl moved San Diego into Blair's field goal range; his 30-yarder reduced the deficit to 13–10 at the break.

Boston added another field goal at the start of the second half. Hadl then fumbled while being sacked, and Parilli threw his second touchdown of the game. After a Charger punt, Karas again forced a fumble from Parilli, this time making the recovery himself on the Patriot 16-yard line. Jerry MacDougall converted a 4th and 1 before scoring from a yard out, leaving the score at 23–17. After a further Patriot field goal (Gino Cappelletti hit 4 of 7 on the day), Rote returned to the game and was immediately intercepted in his own territory. Boston did nothing with that opportunity, but Alworth fumbled on the next Charger play from scrimmage, and Parilli's third touchdown made it 33–17.

Hadl was again inserted at quarterback; he threw nine times on the ensuing drive, completing five for 80 yards, including a 15-yard touchdown to Don Norton; he also found MacDougall for a two-point conversion, reducing the deficit to eight points. Boston went three-and-out, and Alworth's 42-yard punt return had San Diego starting out only six yards from a potential tie. After three plays netted only two yards, head coach Sid Gillman opted to take the short field goal with 2:47 to play. Blair converted to pull his team with five points. His onside kick was then covered by the Patriots, but Boston again went three-and-out. Starting from his own 20 with 1:14 left to play, Hadl hit Alworth for 14 yards and MacDougall for 24, advancing to the Boston 42-yard line. His next pass went deep, but Patriot defensive back Ron Hall secured victory with his third interception of the day at his own 17-yard line.

The game was a rematch of the previous season's title game, won easily by San Diego. With Paul Lowe out injured, the Chargers' running game could muster only 84 yards.

==== Week 3: at Buffalo Bills ====
Week Three: San Diego Chargers at Buffalo Bills – Game summary

Quarter	1	2	3	4	Total
Chargers	0	3	0	0	**3**
**Bills**	7	7	3	13	**30**

at War Memorial Stadium, Buffalo, New York

- Date: September 26
- Game weather: 59 °F (15.0 °C), relative humidity 63%, wind 13 mph
- Game attendance: 40,167
- Box score

Game information

**First quarter**

- BUF – Butch Byrd 75-yard interception return (Pete Gogolak kick), 9:15. Bills 7–0.

**Second quarter**

- SDG – George Blair 12-yard field goal, 13:32. Bills 7–3. **Drive: 6 plays, 21 yards.**
- BUF – Hagood Clarke 53-yard punt return (Pete Gogolak kick), 2:17. Bills 14–3.

**Third quarter**

- BUF – Pete Gogolak 13-yard field goal, 6:34. Bills 17–3. **Drive: 14 plays, 61 yards.**

**Fourth quarter**

- BUF – Joe Auer 2-yard run (Pete Gogolak kick), 6:19. Bills 24–3. **Drive: 9 plays, 52 yards.**
- BUF – Elbert Dubenion 40-yard pass from Daryle Lamonica (kick failed), 0:24. Bills 30–3. **Drive: 5 plays, 62 yards.**

**Top passers**

- BUF – Jack Kemp – 8/19, 95 yards, INT
- SDG – Tobin Rote – 8/20, 155 yards, INT

**Top rushers**

- BUF – Cookie Gilchrist – 23 rushes, 81 yards
- SDG – Keith Lincoln – 21 rushes, 94 yards

**Top receivers**

- BUF – Elbert Dubenion – 5 receptions, 123 yards, TD
- SDG – Don Norton – 4 receptions, 110 yards

A pair of return touchdowns sparked a one-sided game. After receiving the opening kickoff, San Diego advanced steadily from their own 20 to a 3rd and 3 at the Buffalo 27-yard line, whereupon Butch Byrd cut in front of a quick sideline pass and went 75 yards the other way for a touchdown. Norton later fumbled at the end of a 42-yard gain, and Buffalo recovered. A Schmidt fumble recovery gave the Chargers a second chance, and Blair kicked their only points of the game from 12 yards out. After the Bills missed a field goal, Rote led San Diego from their own 20 to a 4th and 1 at the Buffalo 26-yard line, from where Lincoln was stopped short of a first down.

San Diego found themselves backed up near their goal line the next time they had the ball. Hadl's punt was fielded by Hagood Clarke at his own 47 – he broke through two tackles en route to a touchdown. The Chargers failed to enter the opposing red zone in the second half, while Buffalo added 16 further points.

With Lowe still out injured, Lincoln rushed 21 times for 94 yards. Norton caught 4 passes for 112 yards.

==== Week 4: at New York Jets ====
Week Four: San Diego Chargers at New York Jets – Game summary

Quarter	1	2	3	4	Total
Chargers	3	7	0	7	**17**
Jets	0	3	7	7	**17**

at Shea Stadium, New York, New York

- Date: October 3
- Game weather: 63 °F (17.2 °C), relative humidity 61%, wind 13 mph
- Game attendance: 46,828
- Box score

Game information

**First quarter**

- SDG – Keith Lincoln 47-yard field goal, 2:27. Chargers 3–0.

**Second quarter**

- SDG – Dave Kocourek 30-yard pass from Tobin Rote (Keith Lincoln kick), 12:30. Chargers 10–0.
- NYJ – Jim Turner 34-yard field goal, 4:10. Chargers 10–3.

**Third quarter**

- NYJ – Bake Turner 23-yard pass from Dick Wood (Jim Turner kick), 12:07. Tied 10–10.

**Fourth quarter**

- SDG – Paul Lowe 17-yard pass from Tobin Rote (Keith Lincoln kick), 3:49. Chargers 17–10.
- NYJ – Don Maynard 68-yard pass from Dick Wood (Jim Turner kick), 0:56. Tied 17–17.

**Top passers**

- SDG – Tobin Rote – 15/29, 225 yards, 2 TD, 2 INT
- NYJ – Dick Wood – 19/43, 302 yards, 2 TD, 2 INT

**Top rushers**

- SDG – Paul Lowe – 19 rushes, 64 yards
- NYJ – Bill Mathis – 7 rushes, 22 yards

**Top receivers**

- SDG – Keith Lincoln – 6 receptions, 94 yards
- NYJ – Don Maynard – 4 receptions, 113 yards, TD

Lincoln's late field goal attempt was blocked as San Diego played out the first tie in franchise history. Lincoln, who had been handed the placekicking duties on account of Blair's injury, had opened the scoring with a 47-yard kick, tying Ben Agajanian's club record set in 1960. The running back also played a role in San Diego's first touchdown, taking a pass in the flat from an under-pressure Rote and skipping out of two tackles in the backfield en route to a 32-yard gain. That led to a 30-yard touchdown for Kocourek, who fought through a last-ditch tackle inside the five.

After former Charger Dick Wood had tied the game with a 3rd-quarter touchdown pass, Lowe's 17-yard reception restored the lead. Rookie cornerback Jimmy Warren was then beaten on a deep throw from Wood to Don Maynard, whose 68-yard touchdown provided the game's final points. Lincoln's late chance came from 40 yards out, but Wahoo McDaniel made his second block of the game with 23 seconds to play.

Rote finished on 15 of 29 for 225 yards, two touchdowns and two interceptions. Lowe gained 64 yards on the ground and 31 through the air on his return to action, as well as scoring a touchdown; Lincoln had 26 yards on the ground and 94 through the air. The attendance of nearly 47,000 set a new AFL record.

==== Week 5: at Boston Patriots ====
Week Five: San Diego Chargers at Boston Patriots – Game summary

Quarter	1	2	3	4	Total
**Chargers**	0	10	13	3	**26**
Patriots	3	0	7	7	**17**

at Fenway Park, Boston, Massachusetts

- Date: October 9
- Game weather: 50 °F (10.0 °C), relative humidity 97%, wind 9 mph
- Game attendance: 35,095
- Box score

Game information

**First quarter**

- BOS – Gino Cappelletti 48-yard field goal, 2:27. Patriots 3–0. **Drive: 4 plays, 44 yards.**

**Second quarter**

- SDG – Herb Travenio 16-yard field goal, 12:30. Tied 3–3. **Drive: 10 plays, 62 yards.**
- SDG – Lance Alworth 27-yard pass from John Hadl (Herb Travenio kick), 4:10. Chargers 10–3. **Drive: 11 plays, 74 yards.**

**Third quarter**

- SDG – Don Norton 15-yard pass from John Hadl (kick failed), 13:02. Chargers 16–3. **Drive: 2 plays, 27 yards.**
- BOS – Larry Garron 1-yard run (Gino Cappelletti kick), 7:47. Chargers 16–10. **Drive: 13 plays, 62 yards.**
- SDG – Lance Alworth 12-yard pass from John Hadl (Herb Travenio kick), 0:35. Chargers 23–10. **Drive: 9 plays, 93 yards.**

**Fourth quarter**

- BOS – Larry Garron 9-yard pass from Babe Parilli (Gino Cappelletti kick), 12:45. Chargers 23–17. **Drive: 8 plays, 77 yards.**
- SDG – Herb Travenio 17-yard field goal, 1:11. Chargers 26–17. **Drive: 4 plays, 8 yards.**

**Top passers**

- SDG – John Hadl – 17/30, 228 yards, 3 TD
- BOS – Babe Parilli – 17/35, 205 yards, TD, 4 INT

**Top rushers**

- SDG – Paul Lowe – 15 rushes, 69 yards
- BOS – Larry Garron – 23 rushes, 79 yards, TD

**Top receivers**

- SDG – Lance Alworth – 8 receptions, 124 yards, 2 TD
- BOS – Gino Cappelletti – 6 receptions, 101 yards, TD

Hadl came off the bench to lead San Diego past the previously undefeated Patriots. Hadl was introduced after Rote's 1st-quarter interception led to a Boston field goal; on his first drive, the Chargers went 62 yards before settling for a field goal by new kicker Herb Travenio. Hadl gained 22 yards on a quarterback keeper early in the next drive, then completed passes of 11, 17 and 16 yards before finding Alworth in the back of the end zone on 3rd and goal from the 2-yard line. Westmoreland thwarted the Patriots with an end zone interception, and it remained 10–3 at halftime.

Despite kicking off, San Diego extended their lead three plays into the second half: Allen recovered a fumble on the Boston 27-yard line, Lowe shaped to pass before cutting up the middle for 12 yards, and Norton pulled in a 15-yard touchdown. Travenio missed the extra point, and Boston converted three third downs while responding with a 13-play, 68-yard touchdown drive. Later, San Diego went 93 yards in 9 plays to extend their lead - Lowe had an 18-yard reception and a 23-yard carry on consecutive plays before Alworth took a quick pass in the right flat, wrong-footed his marker and scored from 13 yards out. The Patriots again responded with a touchdown, reducing their deficit to six points with 12:45 still to play. Following an exchange of punts, San Diego ran the clock down on a 12-play drive from their own 17-yard line to the Boston 14-yard line, but Lowe fumbled the ball and the Patriots recovered. Charlie McNeil's interception and 13-yard return gave his offense another chance, and Travenio kicked the clincher from 17 yards out with only 1:11 to play.

Hadl was 17 of 29 for 228 yards, three touchdowns and no interceptions, and Alworth caught 8 passes for 124 yards and two touchdowns.

==== Week 6: vs. Denver Broncos ====
Week Six: Denver Broncos at San Diego Chargers – Game summary

Quarter	1	2	3	4	Total
Broncos	7	0	0	7	**14**
**Chargers**	7	14	14	7	**42**

at Balboa Stadium, San Diego, California

- Date: October 18
- Game weather: 67 °F (19.4 °C), relative humidity 77%, wind 8 mph
- Game attendance: 23,332
- Box score

Game information

**First quarter**

- DEN – Bob Scarpitto 11-yard pass from Jacky Lee (Gene Mingo kick), 9:29. Broncos 7–0. **Drive: 17 plays, 80 yards.**
- SDG – Keith Lincoln 5-yard run (Herb Travenio kick), 13:18. Tied 7–7. **Drive: 8 plays, 69 yards.**

**Second quarter**

- SDG – Lance Alworth 4-yard pass from John Hadl (Herb Travenio kick), 8:47. Chargers 14–7. **Drive: 4 plays, 70 yards.**
- SDG – Keith Lincoln 2-yard run (Herb Travenio kick), 13:03. Chargers 21–7. **Drive: 9 plays, 47 yards.**

**Third quarter**

- SDG – Dave Kocourek 46-yard pass from John Hadl (Herb Travenio kick), 2:41. Chargers 28–7. **Drive: 6 plays, 80 yards.**
- SDG – John Hadl 18-yard run (Herb Travenio kick), 10:30. Chargers 35–7. **Drive: 5 plays, 36 yards.**

**Fourth quarter**

- DEN – Bob Scarpitto 8-yard pass from Jacky Lee (Gene Mingo kick), 7:00. Chargers 35–14. **Drive: 4 plays, 35 yards.**
- SDG – Jacque MacKinnon 1-yard run (Herb Travenio kick), 12:32. Chargers 42–14. **Drive: 3 plays, 67 yards.**

**Top passers**

- DEN – Jacky Lee – 16/32, 100 yards, 2 TD, 2 INT
- SDG – John Hadl – 18/28, 216 yards, 2 TD

**Top rushers**

- DEN – Charley Mitchell – 15 rushes, 52 yards
- SDG – Paul Lowe – 15 rushes, 83 yards

**Top receivers**

- DEN – Dave Kocourek – 4 receptions, 113 yards, TD
- SDG – Lionel Taylor – 6 receptions, 54 yards

San Diego easily defeated Denver in Hadl's first start since the 1962 finale. Denver scored first, taking the opening kickoff and going 80 yards in 17 plays, scoring a touchdown while running over nine minutes off the clock. Lincoln led the Charger response, gaining 22 yards around left end and later scoring untouched from five yards out. In the 2nd quarter, a 42-yard gain by Kocourek led to a juggling 4-yard touchdown catch by Alworth, and Lincoln's second touchdown made it 21–7.

The Chargers continued to pull away in the second half, with Kocourek scoring after less than three minutes; the tight end took Hadl's pass at the Denver 32-yard line and shrugged off a weak tackle before completing a 46-yard touchdown. Hadl scored the fifth Charger touchdown himself on an 18-yard keeper, and following a consolation score for the Broncos, Jacque MacKinnon went 48 yards on a draw play before scoring from a yard out on the next play.

Hadl finished 18 of 28 for 216 yards, with two touchdowns and no interceptions, while Kocourek caught 4 passes for 113 yards and a touchdown. The Chargers had combined rushing stats of 39 carries for 272 yards, with 4 touchdowns. San Diego outgained an opponent by 300 yards for the first time in a regular season game, with a 486–186 advantage.

==== Week 7: at Houston Oilers ====
Week Seven: San Diego Chargers at Houston Oilers – Game summary

Quarter	1	2	3	4	Total
**Chargers**	0	20	0	0	**20**
Oilers	7	10	0	0	**17**

at Jeppesen Stadium, Houston, Texas

- Date: October 25
- Game weather: 62 °F (16.7 °C), relative humidity 84%, wind 7 mph
- Game attendance: 21,671
- Box score

Game information

**First quarter**

- HOU – Charley Hennigan 8-yard pass from Sid Blanks (George Blanda kick), 0:45. Oilers 7–0. **Drive: 8 plays, 80 yards.**

**Second quarter**

- SDG – Dave Kocourek 12-yard pass from John Hadl (Herb Travenio kick), 11:11. Tied 7–7. **Drive: 9 plays, 72 yards.**
- SDG – Lance Alworth 35-yard run (kick blocked), 6:27. Chargers 13–7. **Drive: 7 plays, 51 yards.**
- SDG – Henry Schmidt 58-yard interception return (Herb Travenio kick), 3:46. Chargers 20–7.
- HOU – Charley Hennigan 21-yard pass from George Blanda (George Blanda kick), 1:01. Chargers 20–14. **Drive: 7 plays, 60 yards.**
- HOU – George Blanda 32-yard field goal, 0:00. Chargers 20–17. **Drive: 2 plays, 12 yards.**

**Third quarter**

- No scoring plays.

**Fourth quarter**

- No scoring plays.

**Top passers**

- SDG – John Hadl – 19/30, 226 yards, TD, INT
- HOU – George Blanda – 22/36, 312 yards, TD, 2 INT

**Top rushers**

- SDG – Keith Lincoln – 12 rushes, 65 yards
- HOU – Charley Tolar – 10 rushes, 48 yards

**Top receivers**

- SDG – Lance Alworth – 5 receptions, 76 yards
- HOU – Charley Hennigan – 8 receptions, 145 yards, 2 TD

Three 2nd-quarter touchdowns in the span of 7:25 proved to be just enough to carry the Chargers past Houston. In the opening quarter, Allen's tackle stopped the Oilers on a 4th and 1, Travenio missed from 42 yards out, and rookie Oilers halfback Sid Blanks capped an 80-yard drive with a touchdown pass to Charley Hennigan. Hadl, who had a string of 13 consecutive completions in the first half, led a 72-yard drive and found Kocourek in the front of the end zone to tie the score. Following a Houston three-and-out, Alworth had receptions of 14 and 11 yards before scoring untouched on a 35-yard reverse. Houston responded by driving into Charger territory, but Faison hit George Blanda as he attempted to pass, and the ball fluttered straight to Hank Schmidt, whose 58-yard scoring return made it 20–7. Blanda responded with a touchdown pass to Hennigan, and after Lincoln had a field goal try blocked, Blanda made a kick of his own as time expired in the half.

There were no points scored in a rain-soaked second half, though both teams had chances. In the 3rd quarter, Travenio missed a 21-yard kick and Warren intercepted Blanda's long pass in the end zone (his first career interception). Blanda missed a 26-yard field goal on the first play of the final quarter. Hadl was intercepted twice as the period wore on, the second of these on the Houston two yard line. The Oilers drove all the way to the Charger 14-yard line inside the final two minutes, before a pair of penalties prompted Blanda to again attempt a game-tying field goal. His kick from 27 yards out was wide right, and San Diego hung on for their third straight win.

Alworth had 5 catches for 76 yards, to go with his first career rushing touchdown. Ernie Ladd was ejected from the game after tearing the helmet from a Houston lineman and striking him on the head with it. He was later fined $500 for the incident.

==== Week 8: vs. Oakland Raiders ====
Week Eight: Oakland Raiders at San Diego Chargers – Game summary

Quarter	1	2	3	4	Total
Raiders	3	7	0	7	**17**
**Chargers**	14	0	3	14	**31**

at Balboa Stadium, San Diego, California

- Date: November 1
- Game weather: 64 °F (17.8 °C), relative humidity 78%, wind 7 mph
- Game attendance: 25,557
- Box score

Game information

**First quarter**

- OAK – Mike Mercer 33-yard field goal, 8:54. Raiders 3–0. **Drive: 7 plays, 14 yards.**
- SDG – Lance Alworth 76-yard pass from John Hadl (Ben Agajanian kick), 8:15. Chargers 7–3. **Drive: 1 play, 76 yards.**
- SDG – Keith Lincoln 9-yard run (Ben Agajanian kick), 4:08. Chargers 14–3. **Drive: 6 plays, 80 yards.**

**Second quarter**

- OAK – Art Powell 14-yard pass from Cotton Davidson (Mike Mercer kick), 3:50. Chargers 14–10. **Drive: 2 plays, 14 yards.**

**Third quarter**

- SDG – Ben Agajanian 32-yard field goal, 4:45. Chargers 17–10. **Drive: 4 plays, 0 yards.**

**Fourth quarter**

- SDG – Keith Lincoln 12-yard run (Ben Agajanian kick), 13:24. Chargers 24–10.
- OAK – Jan Barrett 41-yard pass from Cotton Davidson (Mike Mercer kick), 11:46. Chargers 24–17.
- SDG – Lance Alworth 47-yard pass from Tobin Rote (Ben Agajanian kick), 7:35. Chargers 31–17.

**Top passers**

- OAK – Cotton Davidson – 19/45, 317 yards, 2 TD, 6 INT
- SDG – John Hadl – 15/29, 261 yards, TD, 2 INT

**Top rushers**

- OAK – Clem Daniels – 9 rushes, 55 yards
- SDG – Keith Lincoln – 10 rushes, 44 yards, 2 TD

**Top receivers**

- OAK – Clem Daniels – 4 receptions, 96 yards
- SDG – Lance Alworth – 8 receptions, 203 yards, 2 TD

The Charger defense intercepted Cotton Davidson six times, and Alworth had his third career 200-yard game as San Diego defeated the Raiders. Hadl threw the game's first interception, leading to a Raider field goal, but his next pass was a 76-yard touchdown, Alworth sprinting up the right sideline and pulling in the ball at the Oakland 30-yard line en route to the end zone. Oakland responded with a drive into Charger territory, but Graham intercepted Davidson in the end zone. Kocourek's 49-yard catch was the biggest play on the ensuing drive, which ended with Lincoln's 9-yard touchdown run through the left guard area. Further interceptions by Allen and Harris gave San Diego openings in opposition territory, but Ben Agajanian missed a field goal, and Alworth later fumbled after making a catch. Davidson found Art Powell for a touchdown, and the halftime score was 14–10.

In the 3rd quarter, Westmoreland intercepted an overthrown ball and ran it back 38 yards to the Oakland 24-yard line, setting up a 32-yard Agajanian kick. Next, Lincoln doubled the Charger lead with a 12-yard run up the middle. Oakland pulled back within seven after Davidson's second touchdown pass of the day, but Alworth had the final score, making a juggling, one-handed catch of a deep ball from Rote while fending off a defensive back. Dick Harris intercepted Davidson in the end zone to end the final Raider threat.

Harris and Westmoreland each had two interceptions. Alworth caught 8 passes for 203 yards and two touchdowns. Davidson was the first quarterback to throw six interceptions in a game against the Chargers - the next was Peyton Manning, 43 years later, during the 2007 season.

==== Week 9: at Denver Broncos ====
Week Nine: San Diego Chargers at Denver Broncos – Game summary

Quarter	1	2	3	4	Total
**Chargers**	7	3	7	14	**31**
Broncos	0	9	11	0	**20**

at Bears Stadium, Denver, Colorado

- Date: November 8
- Game weather: 51 °F (10.6 °C), relative humidity 25%, wind 10 mph
- Game attendance: 19,670
- Box score

Game information

**First quarter**

- SDG – Lance Alworth 5-yard pass from John Hadl (Ben Agajanian kick), 5:53. Chargers 7–0. **Drive: 12 plays, 65 yards.**

**Second quarter**

- SDG – Ben Agajanian 7-yard field goal, 14:12. Chargers 10–0. **Drive: 14 plays, 58 yards.**
- DEN – Jacky Lee 8-yard run (Dick Guesman kick), 5:40. Chargers 10–7. **Drive: 5 plays, 60 yards.**
- DEN – Safety, Willie Brown tackled John Hadl in end zone, 1:51. Chargers 10–9.

**Third quarter**

- DEN – Jim McMillin fumble recovery in end zone (Mickey Slaughter run), 13:51. Broncos 17–10.
- DEN – Dick Guesman 44-yard field goal, 8:20. Broncos 20–10. **Drive: 10 plays, 30 yards.**
- SDG – Don Norton 20-yard pass from Tobin Rote (Ben Agajanian kick), 2:02. Broncos 20–17. **Drive: 3 plays, 11 yards.**

**Fourth quarter**

- SDG – Keith Lincoln 2-yard pass from Tobin Rote (Ben Agajanian kick), 3:11. Chargers 24–20. **Drive: 5 plays, 15 yards.**
- SDG – Jacque MacKinnon 7-yard run (Ben Agajanian kick), 2:22. Chargers 31–20. **Drive: 2 plays, 7 yards.**

**Top passers**

- SDG – Tobin Rote – 5/12, 84 yards, 2 TD, INT
- DEN – Jacky Lee – 12/23, 171 yards, 3 INT

**Top rushers**

- SDG – Keith Lincoln – 20 rushes, 100 yards
- DEN – Charley Mitchell – 18 rushes, 63 yards

**Top receivers**

- SDG – Don Norton – 7 receptions, 78 yards, TD
- DEN – Al Denson – 4 receptions, 83 yards

San Diego scored the final 21 points to win a seesaw game. The Broncos received the opening kickoff, and drove into Charger territory before Faison deflected a pass and Harris intercepted it. San Diego then drove 65 yards the other way, and Alworth's catch on a 5-yard out route gave them the lead. Agajanian added a short field goal early in the 2nd quarter, but the next four scores were all by Denver. Firstly, quarterback Jacky Lee broke the grasp of Faison and scrambled for a touchdown from eight yards out. The lead was cut to a single point at the break when Hadl was unable to get his punt away after a high snap, and was downed in the end zone for a safety. There were further long snapping issues shortly after halftime - this time, Hadl couldn't handle a low snap, and the ball was knocked into San Diego's end zone where Denver recovered it, before adding a two-point conversion on a fake kick. A Bronco field goal made it 20–10 with 8:20 to play in the third quarter.

After the Chargers were forced to punt on their next possession, the struggling Hadl was removed from the game and replaced by Rote; he came in with a golden chance to score after Lee's ill-advised lateral was recovered by Allen on the Denver 11-yard line. Rote was sacked to push the Chargers back to a 3rd and 19 from the 20-yard line, but he responded by finding Norton for a touchdown on the next play. Late in the game, Buncom intercepted a deflected screen pass, and San Diego took over at the Denver 15-yard line. Norton kept the offense on the field with a 15-yard catch on 3rd and 15, before Lincoln caught the go-ahead score from two yards out with 3:11 to play. Bob Petrich intercepted Lee's next pass (the defensive end's lone career interception) and Mackinnon ran in an insurance touchdown two plays later. Whitehead's fumble recovery stopped the final Bronco drive.

Lincoln rushed 20 times for 100 yards. It was the only 100-yard game by a Chargers runner all season.

==== Week 10: at Kansas City Chiefs ====
Week Ten: San Diego Chargers at Kansas City Chiefs – Game summary

Quarter	1	2	3	4	Total
**Chargers**	0	28	0	0	**28**
Chiefs	0	7	0	7	**14**

at Municipal Stadium, Kansas City, Missouri

- Date: November 15
- Game weather: 67 °F (19.4 °C), relative humidity 76%, wind 11 mph
- Game attendance: 19,792
- Box score

Game information

**First quarter**

- No scoring plays.

**Second quarter**

- SDG – Paul Lowe 50-yard run (Keith Lincoln kick), 12:39. Chargers 7–0. **Drive: 8 plays, 89 yards.**
- SDG – Dave Kocourek 38-yard pass from John Hadl (Keith Lincoln kick), 11:55. Chargers 14–0. **Drive: 3 plays, 34 yards.**
- SDG – Lance Alworth 47-yard pass from John Hadl (Keith Lincoln kick), 1:21. Chargers 21–0. **Drive: 1 play, 47 yards.**
- SDG – Lance Alworth 19-yard run (Keith Lincoln kick), 0:27. Chargers 28–0. **Drive: 1 play, 19 yards.**
- KAN – Abner Haynes fumble recovery in end zone (Tommy Brooker kick), 0:00. Chargers 28–7.

**Third quarter**

- No scoring plays.

**Fourth quarter**

- KAN – Len Dawson 1-yard run (Tommy Brooker kick), 13:29. Chargers 28–14. **Drive: 5 plays, 31 yards.**

**Top passers**

- SDG – John Hadl – 11/19, 238 yards, 2 TD
- KAN – Len Dawson – 17/34, 176 yards, 2 INT

**Top rushers**

- SDG – Paul Lowe – 7 rushes, 41 yards, TD
- KAN – Mack Lee Hill – 8 rushes, 36 yards

**Top receivers**

- SDG – Lance Alworth – 5 receptions, 168 yards, TD
- KAN – Abner Haynes – 7 receptions, 70 yards

A 28-point 2nd quarter gave San Diego victory over their closest challengers in the AFL West. Lowe opened the scoring when he swept right, slipped a tackler and capitalized on an upfield block by Walt Sweeney to compete a 50-yard touchdown. Lincoln then surprised the Chiefs with an onside kick, recovered by Duncan in Kansas City territory. Three plays later, Hadl hit Kocourek deep over the middle, the tight end pulling the ball in as he crossed the goal line for a 38-yard touchdown. A Buncom fumble recovery stopped the next Chief drive; Kansas City tried a fake punt on their following possession, but another fumble spoiled the play, and San Diego took over on the opposing 47-yard line. Hadl immediately went long for Alworth, who had outpaced his marker and scored easily. That touchdown came with 1:21 to play in the first half, which proved to be time enough for two further scores. Karas recovered a fumbled snap on the next play from scrimmage, and Alworth scored on a 19-yard reverse. Kansas City responded with an unusual touchdown, as Westmoreland intercepted Len Dawson's long pass at the 5 yard-line, only to fumble into the end zone where the Chiefs recovered.

A further fumbled snap foiled the best Chiefs opening of the 3rd quarter, with Faison recovering. Len Dawson did manage to finish a drive off early in the final quarter, sneaking the ball home himself from a yard out, but couldn't lead his team back into the red zone.

In a Kansas rainstorm, it was the Chiefs who struggled most visibly with the conditions, fumbling nine times and losing three of them; the Charger offense committed no turnovers at all. Hadl was 11 of 19 for 238 yards and two touchdowns, while Alworth caught 5 passes for 168 yards and a touchdown. Karas sustained a broken leg, and missed the rest of the season.

==== Week 12: vs. Buffalo Bills ====
Week Twelve: Buffalo Bills at San Diego Chargers – Game summary

Quarter	1	2	3	4	Total
**Bills**	0	14	0	13	**27**
Chargers	10	0	7	7	**24**

at Balboa Stadium, San Diego, California

- Date: November 26
- Game weather: 58 °F (14.4 °C), relative humidity 93%, wind 9 mph
- Game attendance: 34,865
- Box score

Game information

**First quarter**

- SDG – Keith Lincoln 27-yard field goal, 7:56. Chargers 3–0. **Drive: 10 plays, 43 yards.**
- SDG – Lance Alworth 63-yard pass from John Hadl (Keith Lincoln kick), 3:20. Chargers 10–0. **Drive: 3 plays, 82 yards.**

**Second quarter**

- BUF – Joe Auer 1-yard run (Pete Gogolak kick), 2:49. Chargers 10–7. **Drive: 3 plays, 16 yards.**
- BUF – Jack Kemp 1-yard run (Pete Gogolak kick), 1:56. Bills 14–10. **Drive: 1 play, 1 yard.**

**Third quarter**

- SDG – Don Norton 17-yard pass from John Hadl (Keith Lincoln kick), 1:54. Chargers 17–14. **Drive: 7 plays, 63 yards.**

**Fourth quarter**

- SDG – Lance Alworth 53-yard pass from Keith Lincoln (Keith Lincoln kick), 14:53. Chargers 24–14. **Drive: 2 plays, 57 yards.**
- BUF – Safety, Mike Stratton tackled John Hadl in end zone, 6:50. Chargers 24–16.
- BUF – Daryle Lamonica 1-yard run (Daryle Lamonica run), 3:24. Tied 24–24. **Drive: 5 plays, 18 yards.**
- BUF – Pete Gogolak 33-yard field goal, 0:03. Bills 27–24. **Drive: 7 plays, 19 yards.**

**Top passers**

- BUF – Jack Kemp – 8/20, 136 yards, INT
- SDG – John Hadl – 10/20, 209 yards, 2 TD, 3 INT

**Top rushers**

- BUF – Cookie Gilchrist – 21 rushes, 87 yards
- SDG – Keith Lincoln – 8 rushes, 34 yards

**Top receivers**

- BUF – Ernie Warlick – 3 receptions, 79 yards
- SDG – Lance Alworth – 4 receptions, 185 yards, 2 TD

A late collapse cost the Chargers victory in a battle of division leaders. Early on, ex-Charger Jack Kemp was stopped a foot short on 4th and 1 at the San Diego 39-yard line, and Lincoln caught a 25-yard pass to set up his own field goal. On the next Charger possession, Hadl found Alworth behind a pair of defenders en route to a 63-yard touchdown, and it was 10–0. Hadl was intercepted in his own territory the next time he tried to pass, but Faison forced Cookie Gilchrist to fumble, and Graham recovered to end the threat. There was no let-off the next time Hadl was intercepted, as Buffalo drove 16 yards for a touchdown. Rote entered the game, but was promptly intercepted too – this time, the Bills had to drive only a single yard to take the lead. Rote threw a further interception before the half ended.

The turnovers continued in the second half – Warren intercepted Kemp, but Lincoln fumbled the ball back on the next play. Following a Bills punt, Hadl (reinstated at quarterback), made two big throws on a 63-yard touchdown drive, finding Alworth for 23 yards on 3rd and 2 before hitting Norton in the front of the end zone on 3rd and 10 from the 17-yard line. Daryle Lamonica entered the game, but was swarmed by three Chargers and sacked for a ten-yard loss on third down. After the Bills punted, San Diego needed only two plays to extend their lead, Lincoln taking a pitchout and throwing to a wide open Alworth for an easy 53-yard touchdown and a 24–14 lead a play into the final quarter. Alworth's fumbled punt return gave the Bills a chance to close the gap, but the Charger defense made a goal line stand after facing a first down at the 4-yard line, with Allen making a pair of tackles before Lamonica was stopped two yards short on 4th down. Hadl was caught in the end zone for a safety by Mike Stratton on the next play, and the game began to turn. Buffalo drove back to the goal line, where they again faced fourth down – this time, Lamonica dove over from the one. The Buffalo QB was stopped short on a two-point try, but San Diego had committed a defensive hold - given another chance from the one, Lamonica again successfully dove through the middle, and the score was tied with 3:24 to play. Warren's 54-yard kickoff return gave the Chargers excellent starting field position, but a Hadl pass was deflected and intercepted, before Buffalo drove into range for the game-winner, a 33-yard kick by Pete Gogolak with three seconds to play.

In total, San Diego committed a season-high seven turnovers. Alworth had 185 yards and two touchdowns from only four receptions. It was the first time San Diego played on Thanksgiving, or any Thursday. The attendance was a Charger record, and represented the first sell-out in club history.

==== Week 13: vs. New York Jets ====
Week Thirteen: New York Jets at San Diego Chargers – Game summary

Quarter	1	2	3	4	Total
Jets	0	3	0	0	**3**
**Chargers**	10	14	7	7	**38**

at Balboa Stadium, San Diego, California

- Date: December 6
- Game weather: 55 °F (12.8 °C), relative humidity 56%, wind 7 mph
- Game attendance: 25,753
- Box score

Game information

**First quarter**

- SDG – Don Norton 8-yard pass from John Hadl (Keith Lincoln kick), 7:58. Chargers 7–0. **Drive: 14 plays, 47 yards.**
- SDG – Keith Lincoln 19-yard field goal, 2:18. Chargers 10–0. **Drive: 7 plays, 31 yards.**

**Second quarter**

- SDG – Paul Lowe 1-yard run (Keith Lincoln kick), 11:11. Chargers 17–0. **Drive: 9 plays, 85 yards.**
- NYJ – Jim Turner 37-yard field goal, 6:56. Chargers 17–3. **Drive: 4 plays, 1 yard.**
- SDG – Keith Lincoln 5-yard pass from John Hadl (Keith Lincoln kick), 0:14. Chargers 24–3. **Drive: 4 plays, 35 yards.**

**Third quarter**

- SDG – Earl Faison 42-yard interception return (Keith Lincoln kick), 1:06. Chargers 31–3.

**Fourth quarter**

- SDG – Lance Alworth 82-yard pass from Tobin Rote (Keith Lincoln kick), 12:02. Chargers 38–3. **Drive: 2 plays, 82 yards.**

**Top passers**

- SDG – John Hadl – 15/27, 240 yards, 2 TD, 2 INT
- NYJ – Mike Taliaferro – 7/16, 69 yards, INT

**Top rushers**

- SDG – Paul Lowe – 18 rushes, 86 yards, TD
- NYJ – Matt Snell – 8 rushes, 24 yards

**Top receivers**

- SDG – Lance Alworth – 3 receptions, 101 yards, TD
- NYJ – Dee Mackey – 2 receptions, 31 yards

San Diego thrashed the Jets on the day they clinched their fourth AFL West title. The Chargers took the opening kickoff and put together a 14-play, 77-yard drive that ended with Norton scoring on a quick out pattern. George Gross recovered Dick Wood's fumble on the next possession, and Lincoln took a screen pass 37 yards before eventually adding a field goal. The Chargers went 85 yards on 9 plays on their next drive, with MacKinnon's 37-yard catch taking them to the goal line, from where Lowe scored. A pair of Hadl interceptions briefly stalled the Chargers' momentum. The first of these led to a Jet field goal, but the second did no damage, as Allen made an interception of his own, returning the ball 33 yards to the New York 35-yard line. That led to Lincoln's touchdown catch 14 seconds before halftime. In a processional second half, Faison made a leaping interception at the line of scrimmage before scoring on a 42-yard return, and Alworth got behind the defense on a play action pass for an easy 82-yard touchdown reception.

Alworth caught 3 passes for 101 yards and a touchdown. Lowe rushed 18 times for a season-high 96 yards and a touchdown. Duncan ran a kickoff back 91 yards (leading to a missed field goal) and made his first career interception. The Chargers enjoyed a 466–113 advantage in total offensive yardage.

==== Week 14: vs. Kansas City Chiefs ====
Week Fourteen: Kansas City Chiefs at San Diego Chargers – Game summary

Quarter	1	2	3	4	Total
**Chiefs**	11	14	7	17	**49**
Chargers	0	0	6	0	**6**

at Balboa Stadium, San Diego, California

- Date: December 13
- Game weather: 58 °F (14.4 °C), relative humidity 29%, wind 9 mph
- Game attendance: 26,562
- Box score

Game information

**First quarter**

- KAN – Frank Jackson 64-yard pass from Len Dawson (Curtis McClinton pass from Len Dawson), 9:44. Chiefs 8–0. **Drive: 3 plays, 73 yards.**
- KAN – Tommy Brooker 27-yard field goal, 4:47. Chiefs 11–0. **Drive: 7 plays, 41 yards.**

**Second quarter**

- KAN – Frank Jackson 5-yard pass from Len Dawson (Tommy Brooker kick), 6:53. Chiefs 18–0. **Drive: 7 plays, 44 yards.**
- KAN – Frank Jackson 21-yard pass from Len Dawson (Tommy Brooker kick), 4:26. Chiefs 25–0. **Drive: 5 plays, 36 yards.**

**Third quarter**

- SDG – Lance Alworth 4-yard pass from John Hadl (kick failed), 11:42. Chiefs 25–6. **Drive: 6 plays, 52 yards.**
- KAN – Frank Jackson 20-yard pass from Len Dawson (Tommy Brooker kick), 6:22. Chiefs 32–6. **Drive: 9 plays, 65 yards.**

**Fourth quarter**

- KAN – Tommy Brooker 21-yard field goal, 12:33. Chiefs 35–6. **Drive: 9 plays, 27 yards.**
- KAN – Bert Coan 1-yard run (Tommy Brooker kick), 9:53. Chiefs 42–6. **Drive: 5 plays, 47 yards.**
- KAN – Bert Coan 37-yard run (Tommy Brooker kick), 6:18. Chiefs 49–6. **Drive: 1 play, 32 yards.**

**Top passers**

- KAN – Len Dawson – 17/28, 220 yards, 4 TD
- SDG – John Hadl – 8/20, 108 yards, TD, 2 INT

**Top rushers**

- KAN – Mack Lee Hill – 20 rushes, 92 yards
- SDG – Keith Lincoln – 5 rushes, 48 yards

**Top receivers**

- KAN – Frank Jackson – 8 receptions, 42 yards, 4 TD
- SDG – Lance Alworth – 6 receptions, 80 yards, TD

The Chargers declared this to be "Tobin Rote Day", as the veteran quarterback was playing in San Diego for the last time. Rote was honored in a halftime ceremony, and started for the first time since week 5. The game itself did not go to plan, as Kansas City forced six turnovers en route to a blowout win.

On the game's opening possession, San Diego tried a fake punt after reaching 4th and 4 from the Chiefs 46-yard line, but Hadl's pass was intercepted. Len Dawson threw the first of his four touchdown passes on the next play (they all went to Frank Jackson), and Kansas City were off and running - it was 25–0 before the Chargers crossed midfield again. When Hadl found Alworth for a short touchdown early in the 3rd quarter, the Chiefs went 65 yards the other way for another Dawson TD pass to shut down the potential comeback.

Duncan lost three fumbles on kick returns, leading to 17 points.. The 43-point margin of defeat would remain the Chargers' worst until a 45-0 defeat to the Patriots 56 years later.

==== Week 15: at Oakland Raiders ====
Week Fifteen: San Diego Chargers at Oakland Raiders – Game summary

Quarter	1	2	3	4	Total
Chargers	3	7	10	0	**20**
**Raiders**	0	14	0	7	**21**

at Frank Youell Field, Oakland, California

- Date: December 20
- Game weather: 57 °F (13.9 °C), relative humidity 81%, wind 12 mph
- Game attendance: 20,124
- Box score

Game information

**First quarter**

- SDG – Keith Lincoln 17-yard field goal, 5:09. Chargers 3–0. **Drive: 5 plays, 19 yards, 2:04.**

**Second quarter**

- SDG – Paul Lowe 41-yard pass from John Hadl (Keith Lincoln kick), 13:16. Chargers 10–0. **Drive: 9 plays, 98 yards, 3:25.**
- OAK – Art Powell 26-yard pass from Tom Flores (Mike Mercer kick), 9:08. Chargers 10–7. **Drive: 6 plays, 55 yards, 4:08.**
- OAK – Gene Mingo 10-yard pass from Tom Flores (Mike Mercer kick), 0:40. Raiders 14–10. **Drive: 7 plays, 56 yards, 0:57.**

**Third quarter**

- SDG – Paul Lowe 28-yard run (Keith Lincoln kick), 12:00. Chargers 17–14. **Drive: 6 plays, 69 yards, 3:00.**
- SDG – Keith Lincoln 33-yard field goal, 5:22. Chargers 20–14. **Drive: 7 plays, 58 yards, 2:44.**

**Fourth quarter**

- OAK – Billy Cannon 13-yard pass from Tom Flores (Mike Mercer kick), 10:20. Raiders 21–20. **Drive: 6 plays, 95 yards, 3:01.**

**Top passers**

- SDG – John Hadl – 10/16, 129 yards, TD, 2 INT
- OAK – Tom Flores – 21/39, 241 yards, 3 TD, 3 INT

**Top rushers**

- SDG – Paul Lowe – 13 rushes, 85 yards, TD
- OAK – Clem Daniels – 16 rushes, 144 yards

**Top receivers**

- SDG – Don Norton – 8 receptions, 98 yards
- OAK – Art Powell – 4 receptions, 60 yards, TD

San Diego improved on their previous week's performance, but nonetheless went into the AFL title game on a two-game losing streak after a narrow defeat. The Chargers wasted numerous early openings, beginning when Petrich's fumble recovery in Oakland territory led only to a missed Lincoln field goal. Ron Carpenter's interception soon gave them another chance at the Oakland 29-yard line, but Hadl immediately threw an interception of his own; Lincoln later missed another field goal before, finally, Whitehead's interception led to a successful kick. In total, 37 of the game's first 38 snaps took place in Raiders territory. Oakland pinned the Chargers at their own 2-yard line late in the 1st quarter, but Hadl led his team 98 yards in only 9 plays, completing 41-yard passes to both Norton and Lowe. The latter of these saw Lowe catch the ball at the Oakland 30-yard line, and battle past four would-be tacklers on his way for a touchdown. Oakland responded with touchdowns on two of their next three drives, both from passes by Tom Flores, and led 14–10 at halftime.

Rote had come into the game following a 2nd quarter Hadl interception, and played the entire second half. His 23-yard completion to Lowe moved the ball to the Oakland 28 on the opening 3rd-quarter possession; on the next play, Lowe swept right and followed a convoy of blockers for an easy touchdown. Lincoln hit a 33-yard field goal on the next Charger possession, making it 20–14. Flores was sacked on 4th and 6 at the Chargers 10-yard line as time expired in the quarter, but threw his third touchdown pass soon after the change of ends. San Diego couldn't cross midfield on their final three possessions, with Rote's final pass being a deep ball intercepted at the Raider 25-yard line with less than two minutes to play.

Lowe had a season-high 165 offensive yards, rushing 13 times for 85 yards and a touchdown while catching 4 passes for 80 yards and a further touchdown. The Chargers suffered a blow in the 1st quarter when Alworth sustained a hyper-extension of the left knee; he missed the AFL Championship game as a result.

=== Standings ===
AFL Western Division
	W	L	T	PCT	DIV	PF	PA	STK
San Diego Chargers	8	5	1	.615	4–2	341	300	L2
Kansas City Chiefs	7	7	0	.500	4–2	366	306	W2
Oakland Raiders	5	7	2	.417	2–3–1	303	350	W2
Denver Broncos	2	11	1	.154	1–4–1	240	438	L2

Note: Tie games were not officially counted in the standings in the AFL.

== Playoffs ==
Round	Date	Opponent	Result	Venue	Attendance	Recap
Championship	December 26	at Buffalo Bills	L 7–20	War Memorial Stadium	40,242	Recap

=== Game summaries ===
==== AFL championship game: San Diego Chargers at Buffalo Bills ====
AFL championship game: San Diego Chargers at Buffalo Bills – Game summary

Quarter	1	2	3	4	Total
Chargers	7	0	0	0	7
Bills	3	10	0	7	20

at War Memorial Stadium, Buffalo, New York

- Date: December 26
- Game time: 2:00 p.m. EST
- Game weather: 57 °F (14 °C), relative humidity 26%, wind 10 mph (16 km/h)
- Game attendance: 40,242
- Referee: Bob Finley
- TV announcers (ABC): Curt Gowdy, Paul Christman

Game information

First quarter

- SDG – Dave Kocourek 26-pass from Tobin Rote (Keith Lincoln kick), 11:49. Chargers 7–0. Drive: 4 plays, 80 yards.
- BUF – Pete Gogolak 12-yard field goal, 4:20. Chargers 7–3. Drive: 8 plays, 61 yards.

Second quarter

- BUF – Wray Carlton 4-yard run (Pete Gogolak kick), 7:11. Bills 10–7. Drive: 8 plays, 56 yards.
- BUF – Pete Gogolak 17-yard field goal, 2:28. Bills 13–7. Drive: 7 plays, 51 yards.

Third quarter

- No scoring plays.

Fourth quarter

- BUF – Jack Kemp 1-yard run (Pete Gogolak kick), 9:12. Bills 20–7. Drive: 3 plays, 52 yards.

Top passers

- BUF – Jack Kemp – 10/20, 188 yards
- SDG – Tobin Rote – 10/26, 118 yards, TD, 2 INT

Top rushers

- BUF – Cookie Gilchrist – 16 rushes, 122 yards
- SDG – Keith Lincoln – 3 rushes, 47 yards

Top receivers

- BUF – Glenn Bass – 2 receptions, 70 yards
- SDG – Keith Kinderman – 4 receptions, 52 yards
  SDG – Dave Kocourek – 2 receptions, 52 yards, TD

The injury to Alworth, their recent poor form and the Bills' home field advantage combined to make San Diego the underdogs for the title game. In the event, they began the game well, but were unable to score after Lincoln was knocked out of the game. The Chargers received the opening kickoff, and Lincoln touched the ball on their first three plays: A 38-yard run, a 5-yard run and an 11-yard catch. Rote, starting in his final game for the team, then threw a 26-yard touchdown to Kocourek for a 7–0 lead after only four plays. The Bills were forced to punt, and Lincoln converted a 3rd and 4 with a 4-yard run. Two plays later, he was hit hard by Mike Stratton while trying to catch a swing pass and knocked out of the game with a broken rib. The play was dubbed "The Hit Heard Round the World". San Diego were forced to punt, and Buffalo drove as far as the Charger 4 before settling for a field goal. Duncan's 72-yard kickoff return set his offense up at the Buffalo 35, but Rote was intercepted only two plays later. Faison prevented the Bills from scoring on the next drive when he tackled Lamonica short of a first down on a fake field goal try, but Buffalo forced two Charger punts and scored ten points from their next two drives. The Chargers gained a first down at the Buffalo 15-yard line late in the half, but Stratton intercepted Rote to preserve Buffalo's 13–7 lead.

Jerry Robinson returned a punt 30 yards to the Buffalo 42-yard line. After a 1-yard run by Lowe and an incompletion from Rote, Hadl came into the game but was immediately intercepted. The teams exchanged punts before Buffalo scored again; Kemp had a 51-yard completion and ran the ball in from a yard out with nine minutes to play. Duncan returned the kickoff 49 yards to the Buffalo 46, and Kocourek's 26-yard catch helped San Diego reach a 3rd and 1 from the 4-yard line. Mackinnon lost a yard on the next play, before Hadl threw incomplete on 4th down. The Chargers had only one more possession after that, running out of time with the ball at midfield.

Both Charger quarterbacks struggled, with Rote completing 10 of 16 passes for 118 yards, one touchdown and two interceptions, while Hadl completed 3 of 10 for 31 yards and an interception. Duncan had three kickoff returns for 147 yards and one punt return for 28 yards. Chargers lose this game and in 1965 lose again to the Bills 23-0.

== Awards ==
Ten Chargers were in the West division squad in the AFL All-Star game, while five were named to the Associated Press All-AFL 1st team and three to the 2nd team. In addition, Alworth received five votes as the AP AFL player of the year, while Lincoln received one; for the equivalent UPI award, Lincoln had two votes and Alworth one. Gillman received a single vote for coach of the year from UPI.

Player	Position	All-Star	AP 1st-team All-Pro	AP 2nd-team All-Pro
Chuck Allen	Linebacker	Yes		
Lance Alworth	Flanker	Yes	Yes	
Frank Buncom	Linebacker	Yes		Yes
Earl Faison	Defensive end	Yes	Yes	
John Hadl	Quarterback	Yes		
Dave Kocourek	Tight end	Yes		Yes
Ernie Ladd	Defensive tackle	Yes	Yes	
Keith Lincoln	Running back	Yes	Yes	
Ron Mix	Tackle	Yes	Yes	
Walt Sweeney	Guard	Yes		
Dick Westmoreland	Guard			Yes
