= Don Norton =

American football player (1938–1997)

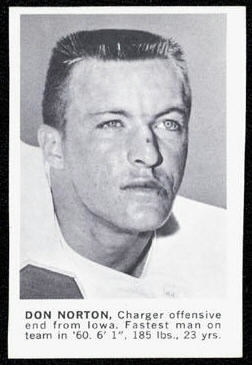

No. 88
- Position: End

Personal information
- Born: March 13, 1938; Iowa City, Iowa, U.S.
- Died: June 23, 1997 (aged 59); Cedar Rapids, Iowa, U.S.
- Listed height: 6 ft 1 in (1.85 m)
- Listed weight: 190 lb (86 kg)

Career information
- High school: Anamosa (IA)
- College: Iowa
- NFL draft: 1960: 5th round, 56th overall pick
- AFL draft: 1960: 1st round

Career history
- Los Angeles/San Diego Chargers (1960-1966)

Awards and highlights
- AFL champion (1963); 2× AFL All-Star (1961, 1962); National champion (1958); First-team All-American (1959); First-team All-Big Ten (1959)

Career NFL statistics
- Receptions: 228
- Receiving yards: 3,486
- Touchdowns: 27
- Stats at Pro Football Reference

Donald Farris Norton (March 3, 1938 – June 23, 1997) was an American professional football player who was an end in the American Football League (AFL). He played college football for the Iowa Hawkeyes and was selected by the newly formed AFL in 1960, playing seven seasons for the Los Angeles/San Diego Chargers (1960–1966), making the AFL All-Star team in 1961 and 1962. After retiring, Norton began to experience health problems from steroid use, which was widespread in the teams he played on. He suffered a heart attack at the age of 59 and died in 1997 after undergoing open heart surgery.

== AFL career statistics ==
Legend
	Won the AFL championship
**Bold**	Career high

=== Regular season ===
Year	Team	Games		Receiving				
Year	Team	GP	GS	Rec	Yds	Avg	Lng	TD
1960	LAC	14	6	25	414	16.6	**69**	5
1961	SDG	14	14	47	**816**	**17.4**	52	6
1962	SDG	14	14	48	771	16.1	47	**7**
1963	SDG	7	6	21	281	13.4	36	1
1964	SDG	14	13	**49**	669	13.7	58	6
1965	SDG	14	12	34	485	14.3	61	2
1966	SDG	14	4	4	50	12.5	18	0
Career		91	69	228	3,486	15.3	69	27

=== Playoffs ===
Year	Team	Games		Receiving				
Year	Team	GP	GS	Rec	Yds	Avg	Lng	TD
1960	LAC	1	1	**6**	**55**	9.2	18	0
1961	SDG	1	1	3	48	16.0	28	0
1963	SDG	1	1	2	44	22.0	30	**1**
1964	SDG	1	1	1	13	13.0	13	0
1965	SDG	1	1	1	35	**35.0**	**35**	0
Career		5	5	13	195	15.0	35	1

== See also ==
- List of American Football League players
