= Butch Byrd =

American football player (born 1941)

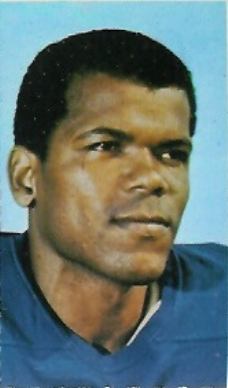
- Byrd in 1969

No. 42, 24
- Position: Cornerback

Personal information
- Born: September 20, 1941 (age 85); Watervliet, New York, U.S.
- Listed height: 6 ft 0 in (1.83 m)
- Listed weight: 211 lb (96 kg)

Career information
- High school: La Salle (Troy, New York)
- College: Boston University
- AFL draft: 1964: 4th round, 25th overall pick

Career history
- Buffalo Bills (1964–1970); Denver Broncos (1971)

Awards and highlights
- 2× AFL champion (1964, 1965); 3× First-team All-AFL (1965, 1966, 1969); 2× Second-team All-AFL (1964, 1968); 5× AFL All-Star (1964–1966, 1968, 1969); AFL All-Time Second-team; Buffalo Bills 50th Anniversary Team

Career statistics
- Interceptions: 40
- Interception yards: 666
- Fumble recoveries: 7
- Total touchdowns: 6
- Stats at Pro Football Reference

George Edward "Butch" Byrd (born September 20, 1941) is an American former professional football player who was a cornerback and punt return specialist in the American Football League (AFL) and National Football League (NFL), playing for the Buffalo Bills and Denver Broncos. He played college football for the Boston University Terriers and was selected by the Buffalo Bills in the fourth round of the 1964 AFL draft.

Over his seven years with the Buffalo Bills (1964 to 1970), Byrd was selected to play in five AFL All-Star Games, named first-team All-AFL three times, and named second-team All-AFL twice. Over fifty years after he left the Bills, Byrd still holds the team records for interceptions (40), return yardage on interceptions (666), and interceptions returned for touchdowns (5). During his first three seasons, the Bills went to the AFL Championship Game, winning in 1964 and 1965. Byrd intercepted passes in both of those games and scored a touchdown on a 74-yard punt return in the 1965 game. In an early 1966 game against the Miami Dolphins, he had a 60-yard interception return for a touchdown and a 74-yard punt return for a touchdown. In January 1970, the Pro Football Hall of Fame named Byrd to the second team of the American Football League All-Time Team, at cornerback. In 1984, he was named to the Bills Silver Anniversary All-Time Team. He was also voted to the Bills 50th Season All-Time Team.

== Early life ==
Byrd was born on September 20, 1941, in Watervliet, New York, outside of Albany. He attended La Salle Institute (LSI) in Troy, New York for high school. He played on LSI's football team. As a senior in 1959, the 6 ft (1.83 m) 170 lb (77.1 kg) Byrd led the team to an undefeated season. Byrd had eight touchdowns and played every minute of four different games during that season. He was team co-captain that year, and was unanimously named a scholastic all-star on both offense (fullback) and defense (defensive back) in a coaches' vote. This was the second consecutive year he was chosen a scholastic all-star at fullback. Byrd was reportedly 6 ft 195 lb (84.5 kg) at the time he graduated in June 1960. He also played baseball and basketball at LSI.

== College career ==
Byrd received a football scholarship to attend Boston University (BU), and play for the Terriers. While at LSI, Byrd had been scouted for BU by George Winkler. Byrd received scholarship offers from smaller schools, but he wanted to play for a larger university.

Byrd played both offense and defense for the Terriers as a running back and defensive back, and also served as a punt and kickoff returner. As a sophomore in 1961, he was called the fastest man on the Terriers. He was 6 ft 205 lb (93 kg), and ran the 100-yard dash in 9.9 seconds. He played left halfback, and rushed for 187 yards on 52 carries for two touchdowns that season. He also had four receptions for 34 yards. He was voted BU's outstanding sophomore in two games that season, and outstanding back in one of those games.

As a junior in 1962, Byrd rushed for 252 yards on 73 carries with two rushing touchdowns. He also had 10 receptions for 123 yards and two receiving touchdowns. He was second on the team in both rushing and receiving. The following season, he had 91 yards in 24 carries, and led the team with 12 receptions for 193 yards and one receiving touchdown. Byrd averaged 27.9 yards per kickoff return as a senior. In 1963, Byrd received the Thomas Gastall Award as the Terriers' most outstanding back.

Byrd played in the January 1964 Challenge Bowl, held in Corpus Christi, Texas. Byrd scored three touchdowns in that game: the first on an interception return, the second on a pass reception, and the third on a rushing play. He was coached by future Hall of Fame Oakland Raiders' head coach Al Davis in the game. On an earlier occasion, Davis was in Boston with the Raiders to play the Boston Patriots. Davis was in the stands at a Terriers' practice during a passing drill where Byrd was playing defensive back. After witnessing Byrd knock down a pass Davis thought should have been intercepted, a screaming Davis stopped the practice and confronted Byrd saying "'Byrd, your job is not to knock the ball down. Your job is to catch the ball and turn it over to the offense. You haven't done your job unless you've done that'". This made a lasting impression on Byrd, and influenced Byrd's thinking as a professional cornerback to look for an opportunity to intercept the ball each time it was thrown in his direction.

== Professional career ==
=== Buffalo Bills ===
Byrd was selected by the Buffalo Bills in the fourth round, with the 25th overall pick, of the 1964 American Football League draft. In December 1963, he signed a contract to play for the Bills, who anticipated using him as a defensive back. He started every regular season game (98 total) at right cornerback for the Bills from 1964 to 1970, and never missed a game during his time with the team; also playing in three AFL championship games. He played under head coach Lou Saban in 1964 and 1965 with the Bills.

Byrd immediately made an impact in the defensive backfield as a rookie, starting at right cornerback, with seven interceptions that season. He was tied for sixth most interceptions in the AFL that season. In a September 26 game against the San Diego Chargers, he returned an interception 75 yards for a touchdown in the first quarter. Later that season, the Bills defeated the Chargers 20–7 for the AFL championship. Byrd had an interception in the championship game. He was named an AFL All-Star as a rookie, and the Newspaper Enterprise Association (NEA) named him second-team All-AFL. The 1964 All-Star Game was to be played in New Orleans in early January 1965, but after a number of the AFL's Black all-stars were treated abusively in New Orleans (including threats at gunpoint) and all the Black players were refused service at some venues and on public transportation, the players voted not to play the game and to leave New Orleans. The AFL quickly moved the game to Houston.

In 1965, Byrd had five interceptions. He also returned 22 punts for 220 yards. His ten-yards per punt return average was tied for fourth best in the AFL that season, and he was tied for ninth in interceptions. He was selected to the AFL All-Star team for the second consecutive season. Byrd was selected first-team All-AFL by the AFL and the Associated Press (AP), and second-team All-AFL by the NEA and United Press International (UPI). The Bills again defeated the Chargers for the 1965 AFL championship, 23–0. Byrd returned a punt 74 yards for a touchdown in that game, and also intercepted a pass that he returned 24 yards.

In 1966, Byrd had six interceptions. He also returned 23 punts for 186 yards. In a September 18 game against the Miami Dolphins, he returned an interception 60 yards for a touchdown, and returned a punt 72 yards for a touchdown. His 8.1 yards per punt return was fourth best in the AFL, and he was tied for sixth in most interceptions. Byrd was named an AFL All-Star for the third consecutive season, and the AFL, Associated Press, NEA, and United Press International named Byrd first-team All-AFL. The Bills went to the AFL Championship Game for the third consecutive season, but lost 31–7 to the 1966 Kansas City Chiefs.

Byrd had five interceptions in 1967, tied for ninth best in the AFL; and returned 30 punts for 142 yards. In 1968, Byrd played for a Bills team that only won a single game. He had six interceptions, tied for fifth best in the AFL. On September 29, he intercepted a Joe Namath pass and returned it 53 yards for a touchdown. Byrd was named to the AFL All-Star team for the fourth time, and the AP and NEA selected him second-team All-AFL.

In 1969, he had seven interceptions, tied for fourth best in the AFL; for a team that won only four games. In a September 28 game against the Denver Broncos, he returned an interception 12 yards for a touchdown. The following week he had three interceptions in a game against the Houston Oilers. Byrd was named an AFL All-Star for the fifth time, and was selected first-team All-AFL by the AP for the third time. He was also selected first-team All-AFL by the NEA, UPI and Pro Football Weekly.

In 1970, Byrd had four interceptions for the Bills. It was the first season in his Bills' career without a punt return. On November 22, for the fifth time in his seven-year career with the Broncos, he returned an interception for a touchdown; a 23-yard return against the Chicago Bears.

=== Denver Broncos ===
The Bills traded Byrd to the Denver Broncos before the start of the 1971 season, for a 1972 fifth round draft pick, who became Bob Penchion. He once again played under Lou Saban, who was now the Broncos' head coach. Byrd started only one game for the Broncos in 1971. The Broncos released Byrd before the start of the 1972 season. Byrd believed the Broncos' new head coach John Ralston cut him from the team based upon a mistaken belief that Byrd had challenged Ralston's authority among the team's Black players.

Byrd was a five-time AFL All-Star, three-time first-team All-AFL selection, two-time second-team All-AFL selection, and in 1970 he was selected by the Pro Football Hall of Fame to the second team of the AFL All-Time Team. When his career ended after the 1971 season, he was one of thirty players with 40 interceptions (which resulted in him being tied for 15th); in the half-century since he retired, over thirty more players have joined him. He returned five interceptions for touchdowns during his seven-year Bills' career, tied for 33rd on the all-time list of career interception touchdown returns (through 2025). He was tied for fourth on the list at the time his career ended in 1971.

== Career statistics ==
Legend
	Won the AFL championship
	Led the league
**Bold**	Career high

Year	Team	Games		Interceptions					Fumbles				Punt returns				
Year	Team	GP	GS	Int	Yds	Y/I	Lng	TD	FR	Yds	Y/F	TD	Ret	Yds	Avg	Lng	TD
1964	BUF	14	14	**7**	**178**	**25.4**	**75**	**1**	0	0	0.0	0	2	4	2.0	4	0
1965	BUF	14	14	5	119	23.8	62	0	2	0	0.0	0	22	**220**	**10.0**	30	0
1966	BUF	14	14	6	110	18.3	60	**1**	1	**26**	**26.0**	0	23	186	8.1	**72**	**1**
1967	BUF	14	14	5	25	5.0	12	0	**3**	0	0.0	0	**30**	142	4.7	19	0
1968	BUF	14	14	6	76	12.7	53	**1**	0	0	0.0	0	2	11	5.5	11	0
1969	BUF	14	14	**7**	95	13.6	32	**1**	1	**26**	**26.0**	0	7	37	5.3	32	0
1970	BUF	14	14	4	63	15.8	33	**1**	0	0	0.0	0	—	—	—	—	—
1971	DEN	14	1	0	0	0.0	0	0	0	0	0.0	0	—	—	—	—	—
Career		112	99	40	666	16.7	75	5	7	52	7.4	0	86	600	7.0	72	1

== Legacy ==
Byrd was known for using the bump and run technique as a cornerback. Such was his impact as a quick athlete that Lance Alworth (Hall of Fame star flanker of the San Diego Chargers) stated his preference to go up against Byrd when it came to pass plays despite the Chargers' Hall of Fame coach Sid Gillman trying to dissuade him, with Alworth stating: "I want to play against the best". Alworth had to alter his playing strategy to address Byrd's ability to use the bump and run and keep pace with Alworth. Teammate and Bills' left cornerback Booker Edgerson said that Byrd studied game films, learning the tendencies of quarterbacks and receivers, that led to a number of Byrd's interceptions. In 1966, Sports Illustrated described Byrd as "'a gifted punt-return man and one of the meanest tacklers around'".

=== Bills' records ===
After 55 years, Byrd still holds the Bills career records for interceptions with 40, interception return yards with 666 and interceptions returned for touchdowns with five (through 2025).

== Honors ==
In January 1970, the Pro Football Hall of Fame named Byrd to the second team of the American Football League All-Time Team. Byrd was inducted into the Boston University Athletic Hall of Fame in 1980. He also was named to the Buffalo Bills Silver Anniversary All-Time Team in 1984, and voted by Bills' fans onto the Bills 50th Season All-Time Team in 2009. In 2008, he was selected to the Greater Buffalo Sports Hall of Fame. Byrd was awarded the Ralph C. Wilson Jr. Distinguished Service Award in 1994.

Byrd was inducted into the LaSalle Institute Athletic Hall of Fame and the Albany Capital District Hall of Fame in 1980. It has also been reported that he was inducted into the La Salle Institute Alumni Hall of Fame in 2003, the inaugural class of the Capital Region Football Hall of Fame in 2010, the Capital District Sports Hall of Fame in 2003, and the Capital Region Hall of Fame in 2003.

Despite his records and accomplishments with the Bills, Byrd has not been named a member of the Buffalo Bills Wall of Fame, nor the Pro Football Hall of Fame. Columnists in the Buffalo media, nationally in The Athletic, and others with an interest in Byrd have questioned why he is not a member of the Bills Wall of Fame. Byrd himself has expressed the hope that it not occur posthumously. In discussing Byrd's merits to be included on the Bills Wall of Fame, Lance Alworth said Byrd "'should be on the all-world team. I don’t know why he isn’t on that wall, but I’ll take him'".

== Personal life ==
After the Broncos released Byrd, Byrd approached his former coach Lou Saban who was with the Bills, and asked Saban about a coaching position. Saban hired Byrd as a scout, and Byrd worked in that role for half of the 1972 season. Halfway through the 1972 season, the Bills were contacted by the Chrysler Corporation which was looking to hire retired players, and Bills' vice president Jack Horrigan recruited Byrd to work for Chrysler. Byrd worked in Chrysler's management for nine to ten years in Detroit; and then at Polaroid in Cambridge, Massachusetts for another ten years. He retired after working for Polaroid. He lived in Westborough, Massachusetts while working for Polaroid, and continued to make his home there after retirement.

In 2013, he was president of the New England chapter of the NFL Players Association for former players. He noted that he had lingering injuries from football such as a cracked vertebra and nerve damage from a hard hit while also noting how "lucky" he was compared to other players and also welcomed the Harvard study that the league commissioned in 2013 involving player health.

== See also ==
- List of American Football League players
