= Ron Carpenter (linebacker) =

American football player (born 1941)

No. 89
- Position: Linebacker

Personal information
- Born: September 2, 1941 (age 85); Harris County, Texas, U.S.
- Listed height: 6 ft 2 in (1.88 m)
- Listed weight: 230 lb (104 kg)

Career information
- High school: Marshall (Marshall, Texas)
- College: Texas A&M (1960–1963)
- AFL draft: 1964: 12th round, 96th overall pick

Career history
- San Diego Chargers (1964–1965)
- Stats at Pro Football Reference

Ronnie Dean Carpenter (born September 2, 1941) is an American former professional football linebacker who played for the San Diego Chargers of the American Football League (AFL). He played college football for the Texas A&M Aggies and was selected by the Chargers in the 12th round of the 1964 AFL draft.

== Early life ==
Ronnie Dean Carpenter was born on September 2, 1941, in Harris County, Texas. He played high school football at Marshall High School in Marshall, Texas, as a quarterback.

== College career ==
Carpenter enrolled at the Agricultural and Mechanical College of Texas to play college football for the Aggies as an end. He was on the freshman team in 1960 and was a three-year varsity letterman from 1961 to 1963. He caught three passes for 39 yards in 1962 and six passes for 108 yards in 1963. Carpenter was a team co-captain in 1963. At the conclusion of his college career, he played in the Blue–Gray Football Classic.

== Professional career ==
Carpenter was selected by the San Diego Chargers in the 12th round, with the 96th overall pick, of the 1964 AFL draft. He played in 12 of 14 games (all starts at linebacker) for the Chargers in 1964, posting 4.5 sacks and one interception for 29 yards. He also started for San Diego in the 1964 American Football League Championship Game, recording one sack, as the Chargers lost 20–7 to the Buffalo Bills.

Carpenter lost his starting job to Dick Degen in 1965. Carpenter only appeared in six games, starting one, during the 1965 season and made one sack. He also appeared in the 1965 American Football League Championship Game in a reserve role. He was released on August 1, 1966, before the start of the preseason.

== Personal life ==
Carpenter served in the United States Army.
