= Tom Bass (American football) =

American football coach (1935–2019)

Personal information
- Born: August 2, 1935; Riverside, California, U.S.
- Died: July 27, 2019 (aged 83); Encinitas, California, U.S.

Career information
- College: San Diego State

Career history

Coaching
- San Diego State (1961–1963) Assistant coach; San Diego Chargers (1964–1967); Offensive backfield coach (1964–1965); Defensive backs coach (1966); Defensive coordinator (1967); Cincinnati Bengals (1968–1969); Defensive backs coach (1968); Defensive coordinator (1969); Tampa Bay Buccaneers (1977–1981); Linebackers coach (1977); Defensive coordinator (1978–1981); San Diego Chargers (1982–1985) Defensive coordinator

Operations
- Tampa Bay Buccaneers (1976) Director of pro scouting; New England Patriots (1992) Vice president of pro personnel and player assistance
- Coaching profile at Pro Football Reference
- Stats at Pro Football Reference

Tom Bass (August 2, 1935 – July 27, 2019) was an American football coach who spent 30 years as an assistant with the Cincinnati Bengals, Tampa Bay Buccaneers, and San Diego Chargers.

Bass played at San Jose State University as a lineman until a bout of polio left him unable to play football. He then served as an undergraduate coach, and upon graduation, as the only full-time assistant under Don Coryell. He later worked on the Chargers staff with Sid Gillman, coaching QB's with John Hadl, he was the first Coach hired by Coach Paul Brown on the inaugural Bengals staff, and the Buccaneers staff under John McKay. He joined the Buccaneers in their inaugural season as their director of pro scouting, and unofficially took over the offensive coordinator role when John Rauch resigned. By the next season, he had become the team's defensive coordinator. He is credited with designing the Tampa Bay defense that ranked at or near the top of the league from 1978 to 1981. He left Tampa Bay before the 1982 NFL season to join the Chargers, tasked with improving their league-last pass defense.

In 1992, he was hired by the New England Patriots as their Vice President of Pro Personnel and Player Assistance. He was not retained after the season.

He was also noted for teaching clinics to help female fans understand the game of football, and for having written two volumes of poetry. He has published several books of football drills and instructional techniques.

Bass died in his home in Encinitas, on July 27, 2019, at the age of 83.
