= History of the Los Angeles Chargers =

Sports team history

Home locations of the Chargers franchise throughout their history

The Los Angeles Chargers are a professional American football franchise that currently plays and competes in the National Football League (NFL). The Chargers were established in 1960 and played one season in Los Angeles before moving to San Diego in 1961. The team returned to Los Angeles in 2017.

== Franchise history ==
=== Beginnings: The 1960 AFL season ===
The Los Angeles Chargers were established with seven other American Football League teams in 1959. In 1960, the Chargers began AFL play in Los Angeles with the NFL's Los Angeles Rams as their main competition. The Chargers' original owner was hotel heir Barron Hilton, son of Hilton Hotels founder Conrad Hilton.

The new franchise ran a contest to decide their name, with "Chargers" the winning entry. General manager Frank Leahy picked the name, and Hilton agreed: "I liked it because they were yelling 'charge' and sounding the bugle at Dodgers Stadium and at USC games." The Chargers initially considered playing at the Rose Bowl, but instead signed a lease to play at the Los Angeles Coliseum. Barron Conrad Hilton unveiled the Chargers' uniforms which featured blue and gold with lightning bolts on the sides of the helmets and trousers, at a cocktail party at Hilton's Santa Monica residence. Players Jack Kemp and Ron Mix modeled the new uniforms.

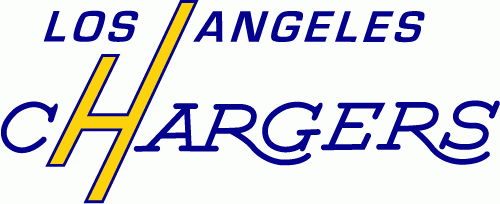
Los Angeles Chargers 1960 wordmark

Hilton named Sid Gillman the first head coach of the Chargers on January 8, 1960. Later that year, Leahy resigned due to ill health, and Gillman became the general manager as well. He served in that dual role until late in the 1969 season and kept at least one of the two jobs until 1971.

The Chargers began their inaugural season on September 10, 1960, overcoming a 20–7 deficit in the fourth quarter to defeat the Dallas Texans 21–20 before crowd of 17,724 at the L.A. Coliseum in the opening league game. They went on to compile a 10–4 record and clinch a place in the first AFL title game; a crowd of 9,928 in the L.A. Coliseum watched the Chargers top the Denver Broncos 41–33 to clinch the AFL Western Division title with a game to spare. On January 1, a crowd of 32,183 in Jeppesen Stadium and a national television audience saw host the Houston Oilers defeat the Chargers 24–16 in the AFL championship game.

== San Diego era ==
The Chargers only spent one season in Los Angeles before moving to San Diego in 1961 due to the popularity of the Rams. Initially denied in December, 1960, but announced in late January, 1961, owner Barron Hilton relocated the Chargers down the coast to a soon-to-be expanded Balboa Stadium at Balboa Park in San Diego for the 1961 season, their home field until 1966. In August 1967, they moved to the newly constructed San Diego Stadium (later renamed Jack Murphy Stadium, then Qualcomm Stadium), where they played their home games until 2017.

The Chargers won their only AFL Championship when they defeated the Boston Patriots in the 1963 AFL Championship Game. After the 1970 merger with the NFL, the team made their lone Super Bowl appearance in 1994: a loss to the San Francisco 49ers in Super Bowl XXIX.

== Carson Stadium plan ==
By the late 2000s, Qualcomm Stadium, one of the last remaining venues in the league to have been built as a multi-purpose stadium, was becoming obsolete. Potential independent stadium projects intended to lure a team to Los Angeles targeted the Chargers as one of several teams that could potentially relocate to Los Angeles. The Chargers were seen as a potentially favorable candidate, given their history in Southern California, the ease in which they could opt out of their current stadium deal, and owner Alex Spanos's advanced age and senility (raising the possibility that son and heir apparent Dean Spanos could be willing to sell a portion of the team in the event of his father's death). The Chargers, during this time frame, publicly committed to stay in San Diego each year and rejected the offers of other stadium developers.

In 2014, the Chargers, the St. Louis Rams, and the Oakland Raiders all intimated they might apply for relocation to Los Angeles at the end of the season. The Chargers announced in December 2014 that they would not be seeking to relocate for the 2015 season, followed by an announcement from the NFL that no team would relocate to L.A. until the 2016 season at the earliest.

In 2015, team spokesperson Mark Fabiani continued to bash the local San Diego city government's efforts to negotiate a replacement for Qualcomm Stadium. When the St. Louis Rams owner Stan Kroenke announced in January 2015 his intention to build a new stadium in Inglewood, California, the Chargers felt pressured to announce their own Los Angeles plan to preserve what they claimed was "25 percent of their fan base" in the affluent Los Angeles and Orange County areas. In February 2015, the team announced a stadium proposal in Carson, California, in partnership with the Oakland Raiders, their AFC West divisional rivals.

The day following the conclusion of the 2015 regular season, the Chargers, Rams, and Raiders all filed to relocate to Los Angeles. On January 12, 2016, the NFL owners voted 30–2 to allow the Rams to return to Los Angeles and approved the Inglewood stadium project over the Carson project. The Chargers were given a one-year approval to relocate, conditioned on negotiating a lease agreement with the Rams or an agreement to partner with the Rams on the new stadium construction.

On January 14, 2016, the team filed paperwork for official trademark protection of the term "Los Angeles Chargers" for the purposes of running and marketing a professional football franchise. Later in January, the Chargers submitted to the City of Santa Ana grading and landscape plans for a five-acre parcel of land in the city that could be used as the location of interim headquarters and training facilities "in the event the team exercises its option to relocate to the Los Angeles area." After two weeks of negotiation, the Chargers and Rams came to an agreement in principle on sharing the planned SoFi Stadium on January 29, 2016. Both teams would contribute a $200 million stadium loan from the NFL and personal seat license fees to the construction costs and would pay $1 per year in rent to the facility's controlling entity, StadCo LA, LLC.

As an incentive to work out a stadium deal in their current market, the NFL pledged $100 million to the Chargers if they come to an agreement with the city of San Diego. While the team had until March 2016 to decide if they would relocate to Los Angeles for the 2016 season, Chargers chairman/CEO Dean Spanos announced on January 29, 2016, that the team would remain in San Diego for the season. The announcement stated that the team would also be working over the year with government and business leaders on a new stadium proposal that could keep the team in San Diego long-term.

The Chargers had continued preliminary work on a ballot initiative for public approval on a new facility. On February 23, 2016, the Chargers announced that their stadium efforts would be focused on a stadium in East Village, downtown San Diego. On March 30, 2016, it was reported in the media that the details of the downtown stadium proposal were unveiled the stadium would be financed from $650 million from the team and the NFL, with a tax hike of $1.15 billion in bonds including $350 million city contribution, $600 million for the convention center, and $200 million to acquire land. On April 21, 2016, rendering of the proposed downtown stadium were unveiled by the Chargers and on April 23, 2016, the downtown stadium initiative signature collecting was launched with Roger Goodell, Philip Rivers, LaDainian Tomlinson, Mike McCoy, and Dean Spanos. On June 10, 2016, the Chargers announced that they had collected 110,786 signatures for the downtown stadium initiative 1 month later on July 9, 2016, San Diego City Clerk Liz Malland announced that the downtown Chargers stadium initiative had secured enough valid signatures to be put on the November 2016 ballot. On July 18, 2016, the San Diego City Council voted 8–0 to put the Chargers stadium plan and the Citizens Plan on the November ballot. On July 28, 2016, the San Diego Regional Chamber of Commerce announced its support of the Chargers downtown stadium proposal. On October 3, 2016, Mayor Kevin Faulconer officially announced his support of the Chargers stadium plan. On November 8, 2016, Measure C was voted down (57% opposed over 43% in support). On December 14, 2016, at an owners' meeting, the terms of the Chargers and Rams lease agreement, as well as the team's debt ceiling were approved thus taking the first steps for a possible relocation to Los Angeles in 2017. On December 23, 2016, the Chargers agreed to lease part of a Costa Mesa office campus for offices, practice fields, and training facility on nearly 3.2 acres.

== Return to Los Angeles ==
=== Dignity Health Sports Park ===
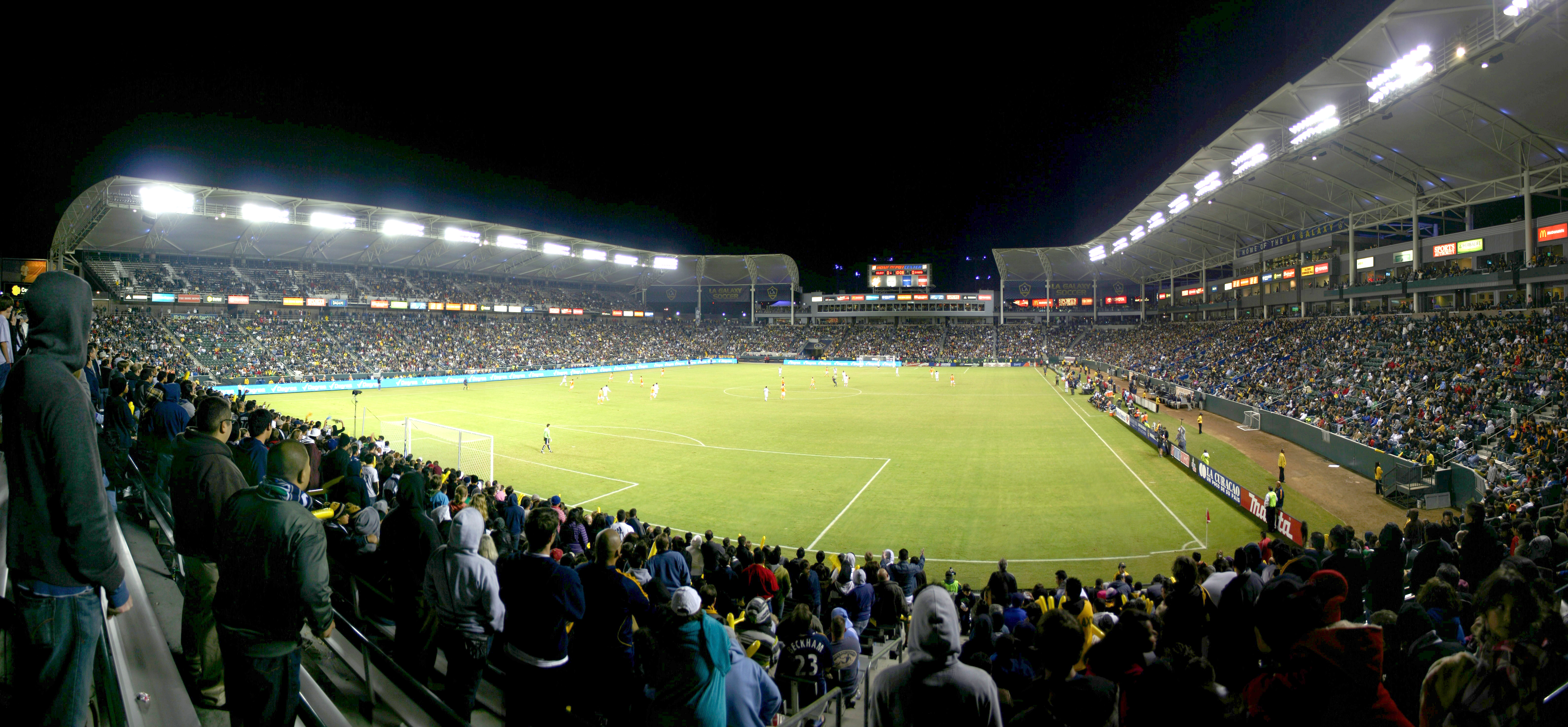
Dignity Health Sports Park in Carson, where the Chargers played from 2017 to 2019

On January 12, 2017, Chargers chairman Dean Spanos announced in a letter that the team would be moving back to Los Angeles in time for the 2017 NFL Season. The Chargers also announced the team would play their games at the StubHub Center (now Dignity Health Sports Park) in Carson until the completion of Los Angeles Stadium at Hollywood Park (now known as SoFi Stadium) in 2020. There had been speculation that the team may rebrand itself similar to how the Houston Oilers ultimately became the Tennessee Titans in 1999. Unlike the situation between the Cleveland Browns and Baltimore Ravens, the Oilers' rebranding was done by the team's choice and not by court order. Plus, the Titans retained the franchise records of the Oilers, unlike the Ravens who technically became a new franchise when they arrived from Cleveland in 1996. Arguments in favor of keeping the team's current name include the fact that team already had a history in Los Angeles (however distant and brief) and the presence of the team's existing fan base in the area on account of being the only Southern California-based franchise for more than two decades. The Chargers have announced they had no immediate plans to rebrand after the relocation, although a new alternate logo incorporating the letters "LA" with a lightning bolt was unveiled with the relocation announcement and quickly scrapped after it was "widely ridiculed".

==== Local reception ====
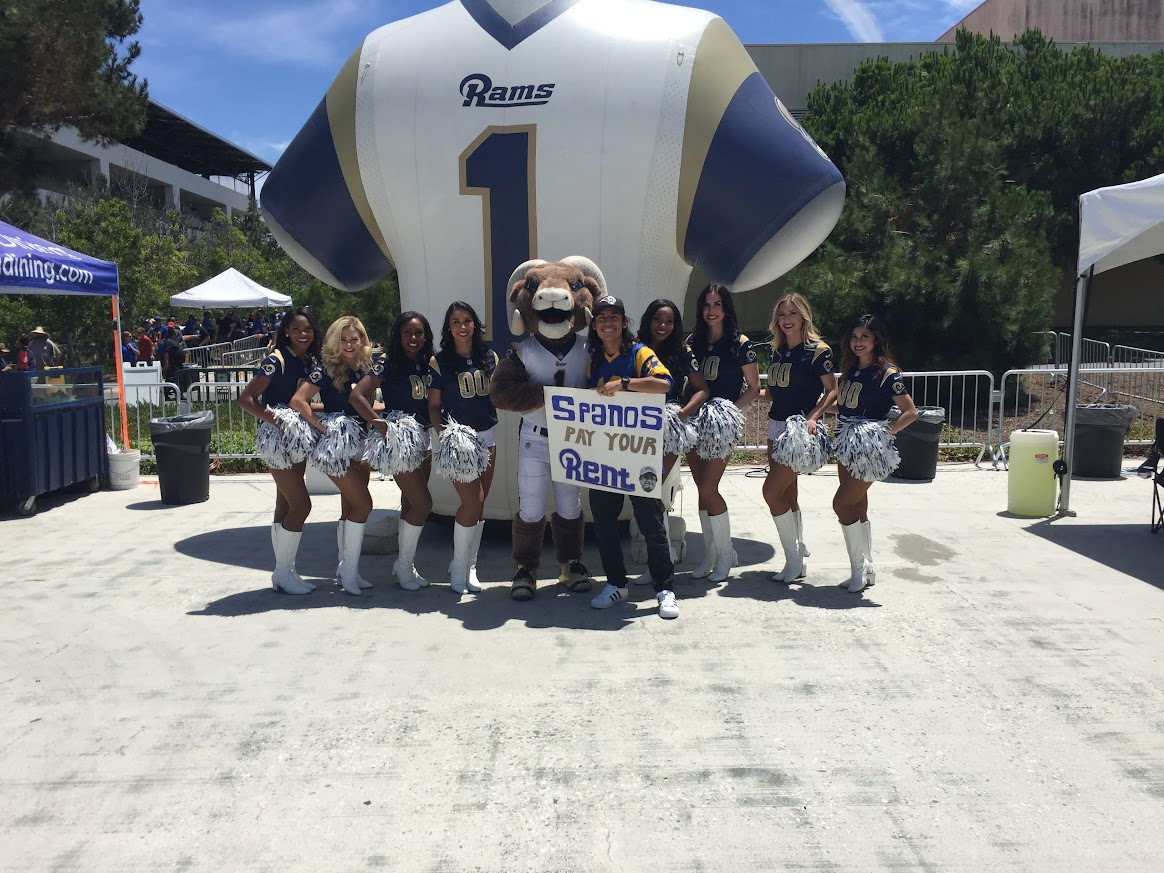
Rams' mascot 'Rampage' posing with a fan with a sign taunting the Chargers during a joint practice between both teams in August of 2019

Reaction to the relocation was not without controversy. Los Angeles Times columnist Bill Plaschke welcomed the team to town by writing "We. Don't. Want. You." At a game at the Staples Center between the Los Angeles Clippers and Lakers, the Chargers' regular logo was shown on a scoreboard and was "booed heartily" Chargers tight end Jeff Cumberland was also "jeered" by the crowd when featured on the big screen.

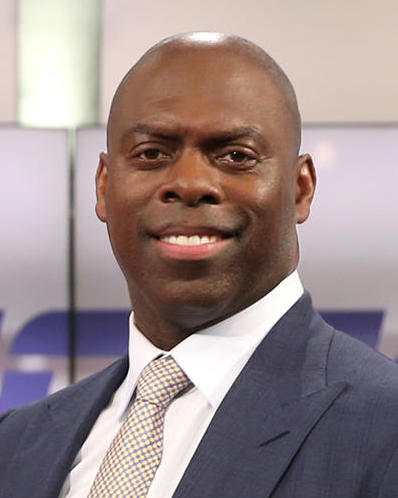
Anthony Lynn was the first head coach of the Chargers after they moved back to Los Angeles.

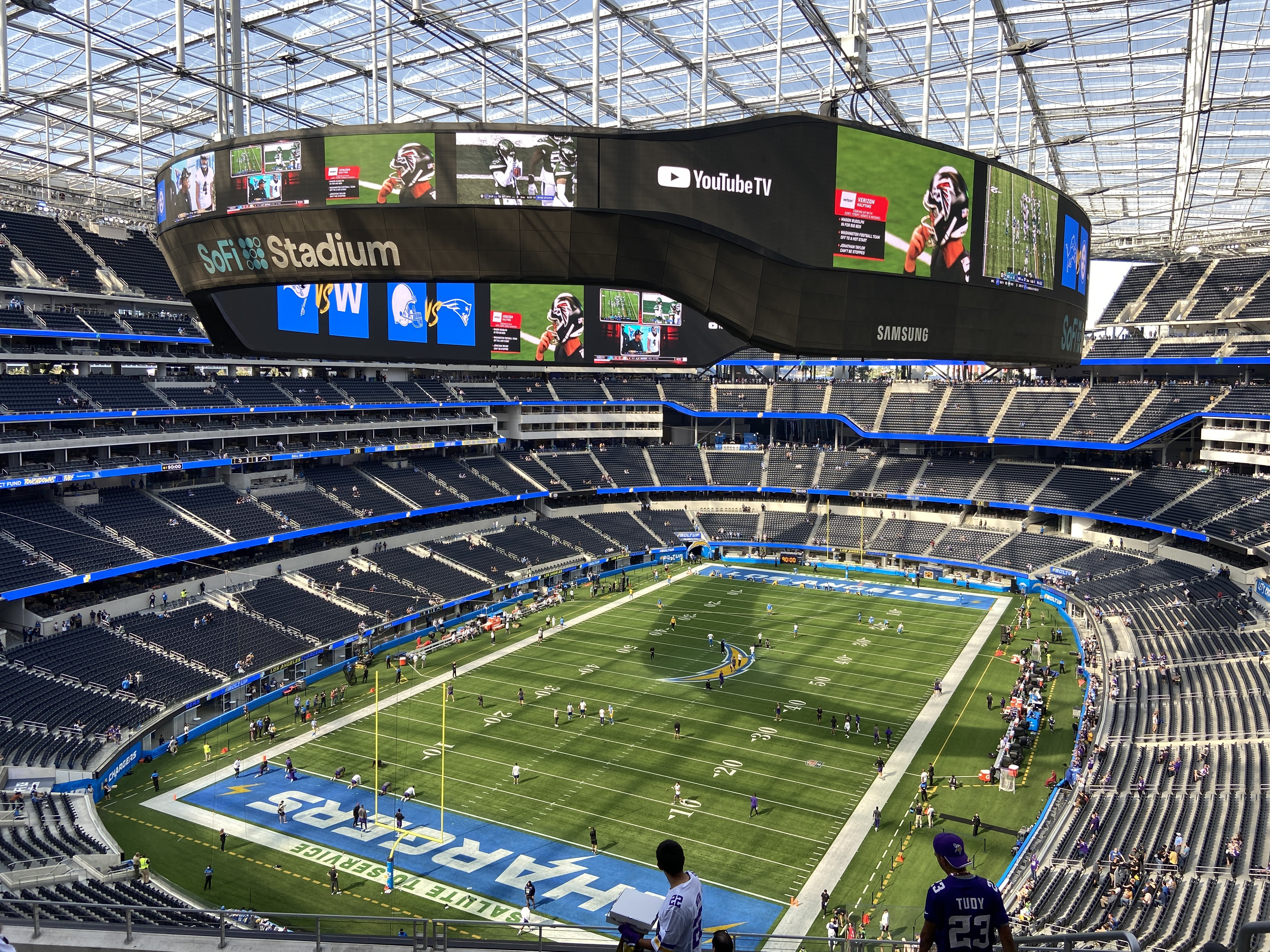
The Chargers moved to SoFi Stadium in 2020

=== 2017–2020: Anthony Lynn and moving in with the Rams ===
On January 13, 2017, the day after announcing their move to Los Angeles, the Chargers announced they had hired Anthony Lynn to be their next head coach. They also unceremoniously fired defensive coordinator and longtime coaching assistant John Pagano, who learned of his dismissal through the media, replacing him with former Jaguars head coach Gus Bradley.

The Chargers narrowly missed the playoffs in 2017, losing out on a four-way tiebreaker with the Titans, Bills, and Ravens. In 2018, the Chargers finished the season 12–4 and went to the playoffs for the first time since 2013, making it to the divisional round before being eliminated by the eventual Super Bowl LIII champions New England Patriots. Following a 5–11 finish in 2019, the Chargers allowed longtime quarterback Philip Rivers, who had started every game for the franchise since 2006, to walk in free agency, leaving backup Tyrod Taylor and 2020 first-round pick Justin Herbert to compete for the starting quarterback position. Taylor won the starting job out of training camp, but was sidelined for Herbert after one game due to a punctured lung resulting from a botched painkiller shot.

Despite prolific play from Herbert, who won the AP NFL Offensive Rookie of the Year award and broke several rookie passing records, including the rookie record for passing touchdowns, the Chargers finished 7–9 and missed the playoffs once again, leading to the firing of Lynn following the season. The 2020 season was also notable for the Chargers as they moved into the newly completed SoFi Stadium with the Los Angeles Rams, though fans did not attend any home games due to the COVID-19 pandemic.

=== 2021–2023: The Brandon Staley era and the Justin Herbert era begins ===
With Herbert firmly entrenched as the starting quarterback, the Chargers hired former Rams' defensive coordinator Brandon Staley as their new head coach on January 17, 2021. The Chargers started the 2021 season strong at 4-1 going into Week 6, but they would struggle and lose 7 of their next 12 games, including a tie breaker to enter the postseason in their season finale on the road against the rival Las Vegas Raiders.

The Chargers performed better in 2022. Despite initially starting with a 1-2 record, Herbert would lead the Chargers to a 10-7 record by the end of the season, earning a Wild Card appearance, although they lost the season finale against the Denver Broncos 28-31. Heading into the Wild Card matchup against the Jacksonville Jaguars, the Chargers were expected to be the favorites. In comparison to the Chargers' fairly average season, the Jaguars had only managed an appearance after a sudden comeback which was guaranteed by a victory against the Tennessee Titans. However, despite initially leading by a large amount (27-0), and causing 4 turnovers on Jaguars quarterback Trevor Lawrence, Lawrence was able to rally the Jaguars to a second-half comeback. The Chargers only scored a single field goal in the second half, and the Jaguars ultimately beat them 31-30, causing the Chargers to blow one of the biggest leads in postseason history.

On December 15, 2023, following a 63-21 loss against the Las Vegas Raiders, Brandon Staley and General Manager Tom Telesco were fired. Brandon Staley ended his Chargers career with a 24-25 record. Meanwhile, Telesco's record as Chargers GM was 86-95. The Chargers hired former San Francisco 49ers and University of Michigan head coach Jim Harbaugh to lead the team starting in the 2024 season.

=== 2024–present: Jim Harbaugh era begins ===
On January 24, 2024, Michigan University head coach Jim Harbaugh was hired by the Chargers as their next head coach. He previously lead the San Francisco 49ers to Super Bowl XLVII in 2012. The 2024 season started with a 2–0 record for the first time since 2012 and they would later finish with an 11–6 record and a wild card playoff spot after a one–year absence. However, despite leading 6–0 in the second quarter, the Houston Texans would eventually end their season with a disappointing 12–32 loss in the Wild Card round.

== Records ==
AFL champions (1960–1969)	Super Bowl champions	Conference champions	Division champions	Wild card berth

Season	Team	League	Conference	Division	Regular season				Postseason results	Awards	Head coaches
Season	Team	League	Conference	Division	Finish	Wins	Losses	Ties	Postseason results	Awards	Head coaches
Los Angeles Chargers
1960	1960	AFL		West	1st	10	4	0	Lost AFL Championship (Oilers) 24–16		Sid Gillman
San Diego Chargers
Los Angeles Chargers
2017	2017	NFL	AFC	West	2nd	9	7	0		Keenan Allen (CBPOY)	Anthony Lynn
2018	2018	NFL	AFC	West	2nd	12	4	0	Won Wild Card Playoffs (at Ravens) 23–17; Lost Divisional Playoffs (at Patriots) 41–28		Anthony Lynn
2019	2019	NFL	AFC	West	4th	5	11	0			Anthony Lynn
2020	2020	NFL	AFC	West	3rd	7	9	0		Justin Herbert (OROY)	Anthony Lynn
2021	2021	NFL	AFC	West	3rd	9	8	0			Brandon Staley
2022	2022	NFL	AFC	West	2nd	10	7	0	Lost Wild Card Playoffs (at Jaguars) 31–30		Brandon Staley
2023	2023	NFL	AFC	West	4th	5	12	0			Brandon Staley(5–9); Giff Smith (0–3)
2024	2024	NFL	AFC	West	2nd	11	6	0	Lost Wild Card Playoffs (at Texans) 32–12		Jim Harbaugh
2025	2025	NFL	AFC	West	2nd	11	6	0	Lost Wild Card Playoffs (at Patriots) 16–3		Jim Harbaugh
89	74	0	(1960 and 2017–present Regular season only)								
1	5	0	(1960, 2017–present Post-season games only)								
90	80	0	(1960, 2017–present Total for all games; 0 AFL Championship, 0 NFL Titles)								

=== Hall of Famers ===
Los Angeles Chargers Hall of Famers
No.	Player	Position	Tenure	Inducted
74	Ron Mix	OT	1960–1961	1979
—	Sid Gillman	Head coach	1960–1961	1983
85	Antonio Gates	TE	2017–2018	2025

== See also ==
- History of the San Diego Chargers
- History of the Los Angeles Rams
- History of the National Football League in Los Angeles
