= Sid Gillman =

American football player and coach (1911–2003)

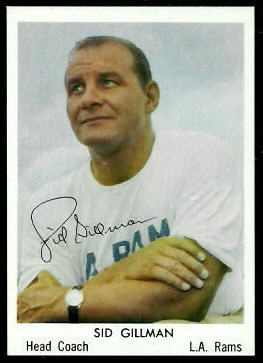
- Gillman as coach of the Rams in 1959

Profile
- Position: End

Personal information
- Born: October 26, 1911; Minneapolis, Minnesota, U.S.
- Died: January 3, 2003 (aged 91); Carlsbad, California, U.S.

Career information
- High school: Minneapolis North
- College: Ohio State

Career history

Playing
- Cleveland Rams (1936)

Coaching
- Michigan State (1934) Assistant coach; Denison (1935–1937) Assistant coach; Ohio State (1938–1940) Assistant coach; Denison (1941) Line coach; Miami (OH) (1942–1943) Assistant coach; Miami (OH) (1944–1947) Head coach; Army (1948) Line coach; Cincinnati (1949–1954) Head coach; Los Angeles Rams (1955–1959) Head coach; Los Angeles / San Diego Chargers (1960–1969, 1971) Head coach; Dallas Cowboys (1972) Quality control; Houston Oilers (1973–1974) General manager / Head coach; Chicago Bears (1977) Offensive coordinator; Philadelphia Eagles (1979–1980, 1982) Quality control / Quarterbacks coach

Awards and highlights
- AFL champion (1963); AFL All-Time Team; Los Angeles Chargers Hall of Fame; San Diego Chargers 50th Anniversary Team; San Diego Chargers 40th Anniversary Team; First-team All-Big Ten (1932); Second-team All-Big Ten (1933)

Head coaching record
- Regular season: AFL/NFL: 122–99–7 (.550)
- Postseason: AFL/NFL: 1–5 (.167)
- Career: AFL/NFL: 123–104–7 (.541); NCAA: 81–19–2 (.804)
- Coaching profile at Pro Football Reference
- Executive profile at Pro Football Reference
- Pro Football Hall of Fame
- College Football Hall of Fame

Sidney Gillman (October 26, 1911 – January 3, 2003) was an American football player, coach and executive. Gillman's insistence on stretching the football field by throwing deep downfield passes, instead of short passes to running backs or wide receivers at the sides of the line of scrimmage, was instrumental in making football into the modern game that it is today. He was inducted as a coach into the Pro Football Hall of Fame in 1983, and the College Football Hall of Fame in 1989.

Gillman played football as an end at Ohio State University from 1931 to 1933. He played professionally for one season in 1936 with the Cleveland Rams of the second American Football League. After serving as an assistant coach at Ohio State from 1938 to 1940, Gillman was the head football coach at Miami University from 1944 to 1947 and at the University of Cincinnati from 1949 to 1954, compiling a career college football record of 81–19–2. He then moved to the ranks of professional football, where he headed the NFL's Los Angeles Rams (1955–1959), the American Football League's Los Angeles and San Diego Chargers (1960–1969), and the NFL's Houston Oilers (1973–1974), amassing a career record of 123–104–7 in the National Football League and the American Football League. Gillman's 1963 San Diego Chargers won the AFL Championship.

== Early life and playing career ==
Sidney Gillman was born on October 26, 1911, in Minneapolis, Minnesota, to a Jewish family. His father was an Austrian immigrant who was in the movie theater business. He attended North High School, and was elected captain of his high school football team in his senior year, and played on a state All-Star team.

He played college football at Ohio State University under coach Sam Willaman, forming the basis of his offense. Gillman was not impressed by Willaman's coaching ability. Gillman was an All-American at end in 1932 and 1933. He was a team co-captain on the 1933 team, and All-Big Ten Conference end in 1933. Gillman played in the first Chicago All-Star Game (1934) with the college All-Stars playing against the NFL champion Chicago Bears, where he was flattened by Bears legend Bronko Nagurski.

While attending Ohio State, Gillman was a brother of the Nu chapter of the Zeta Beta Tau fraternity, living in the fraternity house for three years at college. He played piano in small bands during his college years to make extra money (including one called the Red Hot Peppers). He was a political science major. Gillman debated between pursuing a pro football career and entering coaching upon leaving college, with the Boston Redskins offering him a contract while Willaman wished to hire him as end coach at Western Reserve University. His participation in the inaugural Chicago College All-Star Game caused him to arrive late for Redskins training camp, and he would fail to make the team. He played one year in the American Football League (1936) for the Cleveland Rams.

== Coaching career ==
=== College football coach ===
Gillman was a college football assistant coach for eight years before becoming a head coach. Gilman became an assistant coach at Ohio State under College Football Hall of Fame head coach Francis Schmidt (1934, 1938-40); Denison University under Tom Rogers (1935-37, 1941); and Miami University (Ohio) under Stu Holcomb.

==== Ohio State ====
At his Pro Football Hall of Fame induction, Gillman stated that Schmidt made a "definite contribution to [Gillman's] life". Gillman considered Schmidt an offensive football genius, ahead of his time, and the greatest coach ever. Schmidt's number of plays and formations far exceeded his contemporaries, and he instituted a wide-open high scoring offense, extremely unusual for the 1930s (outside of the Southwest Conference), which also was a boon to the school growing its attendance during the Great Depression. However, Schmidt's pursuit of high scoring, even in lop-sided games, resulted in his nickname being, Francis "Shut the Gates of Mercy" or "Close the Gates of Mercy" Schmidt. Gilman's own offensive system as a coach was born under Schmidt's influence.

==== Army ====
In 1948, after having started his head coaching career, he once more became an assistant coach, serving as the line coach under hall of fame head coach Earl Blaik of Army. He learned "situational substitution" (the platoon system) from Blaik, while teaching an innovative option blocking system to his players. While at Army he befriended future hall of fame coaching great Vince Lombardi, who was an assistant coach at Fordham, with whom he discussed football strategy for hours at a time. Upon leaving Army, Gillman successfully recommended Lombardi as his replacement. Lombardi would use Gillman's blocking scheme to great effect as coach of the Green Bay Packers' championship teams. Lombardi also implemented Gillman's method of film study and player grades with those teams.

==== Miami University and University of Cincinnati ====
In 1944, Gillman became head coach at Miami University, succeeding Holcomb, and coached there through 1947, where his record was 31–6–1. Among his players was Ara Parseghian, a future College Football Hall of Fame coach at Miami, Northwestern and Notre Dame. After a year at Army under Blaik, Gillman became head coach at the University of Cincinnati from 1949 to 1954, with a record of 50–13–1, three Mid-American Conference championships, and two bowl games; while making full use of situational substitution. He used film study and player grades at Cincinnati, and was once admonished by the NCAA for having the players review film during halftime of a game.

At the time he left Cincinnati, it was written that Gillman had a forceful, confident and determined personality; was impatient with mistakes, the hardest working coach, a perfectionist, aimed to succeed at the highest level; and could run up the score like Schmidt. There was a division between those who admired him and those who criticized him. Altogether, he spent 21 years as a college assistant coach or head coach, and his teams' total record as a head coach for these years was 81-19-2. As a college head coach, his teams outscored their opponents 2,571–1,017.

=== Professional football coach ===
==== Los Angeles Rams ====
He became a professional head coach for the first time with the Los Angeles Rams in 1955, after the team had declined in wins the previous two seasons (8–3–1 in 1953 and 6–5–1 in 1954). The Rams were a team bolstered and hindered by its emphasis on explosive offense as quarterbacked by Norm Van Brocklin. A trade for Jim Cason with the San Francisco 49ers also proved helpful in the rookie season that saw Gillman's coaching described as "red-meat, un-finessed brand of football" on the way to a record of 8–3–1 that narrowly beat the Chicago Bears for the right to play for the 1955 NFL Championship Game (their fourth appearance in the past five seasons) against the defending league champion Cleveland Browns, appearing in their sixth straight NFL Championship Game. Playing at home in the Los Angeles Memorial Coliseum due to the rotation of the time, the Browns never trailed while forcing six Van Brocklin interceptions on their way to a 38–14 victory.

His second season with the Rams, which saw them trade away future Hall of Fame defensive star Andy Robustelli in the offseason after a falling out with Gillman, was a disaster, as the team lost eight of their first ten games and ended with a 4–8 overall record, their first losing mark since 1944 when the team was still in Cleveland. The 1957 season was the last for both Van Brocklin (traded to Philadelphia after the season, where he would win a championship in 1960 over Lombardi's Packers) and receiver Elroy Hirsch, each future members of the Pro Football Hall of Fame. Van Brocklin and Gillman had clashed over tactics in 1957, and Van Brocklin would at times override Gillman. After that season, Van Brocklin demanded a trade or he would stay home and run his business, rather than join the team for the 1958 season. Hirsch retired after the 1957 season.

A multi-player deal with the Cardinals for Ollie Matson did not help matters. The season ended on a middling note as the Rams won their last two games of the year to finish at .500. The 1958 season was the closest the Rams got to the top of the division, finishing one game behind the Baltimore Colts. The 1959 season saw the Rams close the year with eight straight losses that led to Gillman‘s dismissal.

==== The AFL and the Los Angeles/San Diego Chargers ====
Gillman then moved to the American Football League (AFL, 1960–1969), where he coached the Los Angeles and San Diego Chargers to five Western Division titles and one league championship in the first six years of the AFL's existence. Lamar Hunt and Bud Adams (Gillman's future boss and nemesis) created the AFL after they were excluded from owning NFL teams, and 1960 was the AFL's first year of existence. Gilman would coach the Chargers for the AFL's entire independent duration, before it merged into the NFL in 1970. Steve Sabol of NFL Films said "'Lamar Hunt is the George Washington of the AFL. Sid Gillman is the Thomas Jefferson.'"

His greatest coaching success came after he was persuaded by Barron Hilton, then the Chargers' majority owner, to become the head coach of the AFL franchise he planned to operate in Los Angeles. When the team's general manager, Frank Leahy, became ill during the Chargers' founding season, its one season in Los Angeles before moving to San Diego, Gillman took on additional responsibilities as general manager. As the first coach of the Chargers, Gillman gave the team a mercurial personality that matched his own.

It was with the Chargers that Gillman developed the innovative aggressive downfield passing attack for which he would become known, and which would change football. Gillman used the length and width of the field, and would stretch the field with the potential long pass, which opened up the middle of the field to runs and shorter passes. As described by one of Gillman's first Chargers' offensive coaches, and future owner of the Oakland Raiders, Hall of Famer Al Davis, "Sid Gillman was the father of modern-day passing.... It had been thought of as vertical, the length of the field, but Sid also thought of it as horizontal. Sid used the width of the field." Hall of Fame coach Bill Walsh, who is usually identified with developing the West Coast Offense, stated much of what he did derived from Gillman. Walsh observed that Gilman had a level of understanding about football that only a few could fully comprehend.

Gillman had much to do with the AFL being able to establish itself as a genuine competitor to the NFL, and a viable football league. Gillman was a thorough professional, and in order to compete with him, his peers had to learn pro ways and how to respond to his innovative offensive concepts and their implementation. Opposing AFL coach Joe Collier said "'Everybody had to work like hell to keep up with him..." They learned, and the AFL became the genesis of modern professional football.

"Sid Gillman brought class to the AFL," Oakland Raiders managing general partner Al Davis once said of the man he served under on that first Chargers team. "Just being part of Sid's organization was like going to a laboratory for the highly developed science of professional football." Others however, painted Gillman as someone who kept the team under pressure at all times regardless of how it felt for the players, with Dickie Post, a running back who played for Gillman from 1967-69, calling him a "dictator". On the other hand, Chargers receiver and tight end Dave Kocourek (1960-65) found Gillman a people person who was not given proper credit for his interpersonal skills. Future Hall of Fame receiver Lance Alworth said of Gillman, "Sid Gillman is a fantastic person, with a brilliant mind, and he has taught John [Hadl] a lot."

Described as "impulsive" by quarterback John Hadl, in 1965, Gillman had arguments with defensive stars Ernie Ladd and Earl Faison over salaries and bonuses, in light of rookie bonuses being paid in sums that far exceeded the salaries of these two star players. Ladd and Faison took the position they would play out their contracts and become free agents. They were both traded by Gillman to Houston before the 1966 season. The league's owners were all concerned about paying bonuses to veteran players, and the effect on the league's viability. Commissioner Joe Ross voided the trade after Gilman alleged tampering against Oilers’ owner Adams. Faison and Ladd ultimately became free agents, with Ladd joining the Oilers and Faison returning to the Chargers for three games before Gilman waived him with an injury notation; the expansion Dolphins ultimately claiming the injured Faison. He started only one game in Miami and saw his career end in 1966. Gillman called Faison, the former four-time All-AFL defensive end, one who "has a long way to go to become average, much less outstanding."

Hadl stated that these removals were part of the beginning of the decline of the Chargers in the late 1960s. When once asked about the money made by players, Gillman responded by saying “With some of them, football is a vocation. With some, it's an avocation. You know what football is to me? It's blood.”

Through Gillman's tenure as head coach, the Chargers went 87–57–6 and won five AFL Western Division titles. The 1960 and 1961 teams were led by Jack Kemp (1960-61) at quarterback to go with Paul Lowe (1960-61) and Keith Lincoln (1961) as running backs. They narrowly lost each time in the AFL Championship Game to the Houston Oilers.

In 1962, with injuries to Kemp and rookie future Hall of Fame receiver Lance Alworth, the Chargers had their only losing season in their AFL tenure (4–10). Even worse for Gillman, he put Kemp on waivers on a Saturday before a game to open up a roster spot, with the common custom being that no other team would claim a player when so waived. Lou Saban and the Buffalo Bills ignored custom and bought Kemp's rights for $100. They made Kemp their starting quarterback at the end of the 1962 season until his retirement in 1969, where he won two AFL titles. Gillman was enraged beyond words, but could not undo the transaction.

John Hadl had been drafted in 1962 as quarterback, but the 1963 season would have 35-year old Tobin Rote as the primary starter at quarterback. That year, under an MVP season from Rote (with Alworth second in the balloting), they captured the only league championship the franchise ever won by outscoring the Boston Patriots, 51–10, in the American Football League championship game in Balboa Stadium. Gillman crafted a game plan, "Feast or Famine", that used motion, then seldom seen, to negate the Patriots' blitzes. His plan freed running back Keith Lincoln to rush for 206 yards, and have another 123 yards receiving.

In addition to Lincoln, Alworth, Kemp, Lowe, Ladd, Faison and Hadl on Gillman's teams through the '60s, Gillman also coached such notable players as future Hall of Fame offensive tackle Ron Mix, Speedy Duncan, Kenny Graham, Dick Westmoreland, and Frank Buncom. Mix grew up in Los Angeles in a sometimes hard-pressed Jewish family, living in a neighborhood where they were the only Jews, and had taken great pride as a young teenager in 1955 when he learned the Rams new head coach, Gillman, was also Jewish. As a player, he found Gillman hard but fair, treating everyone equally. Gillman and Al Davis (also Jewish), emphasized recruiting from Historically Black Colleges and Universities (HBCU), and Gillman instituted a training camp policy that players would room together based on position so that black and white players would room together, a rarity in the early 1960s.

Gillman was one of only two head coaches to hold that position for the entire 10-year existence of the American Football League (the other being fellow Hall of Fame coach Hank Stram, who coached the Dallas Texans and Kansas City Chiefs from 1960 through 1974). Gillman approached NFL Commissioner Pete Rozelle in 1963 with the idea of having the champions of the AFL and the NFL play a single final game, but his idea was not implemented until the Super Bowl (originally titled the AFL-NFL World Championship Game) was played in 1967. Gillman left the Chargers nine games into the 1969 season due to a hiatal hernia only to come back to coach the first ten games of the 1971 season. He resigned as head coach and executive vice president in November 1971, with general manager Harland Svare finishing out the year as coach.

=== Later NFL career ===
==== Houston Oilers ====
Gillman served as a quality control coach for the Dallas Cowboys in 1972. In March 1973, Bud Adams hired Gillman to serve as executive vice president and general manager of the Houston Oilers (to replace John W. Breen) after head coach Bill Peterson won one game in his inaugural season as coach. The 1973 season turned out to be a worse disaster, as the Oilers continued their losing ways. Before the fourth game, Gillman took over the duties of offensive coordinator. After a fifth straight loss to start the season, Gillman took over as coach by firing Peterson, which saw them win once the rest of the way.

In 1974, Gillman hired Bum Phillips (the defensive coordinator for the 1967-71 Charger teams) to serve as defensive coordinator. The 1974 team won on opening day before going on a five-game losing streak. Midway through the season, Gillman and the Oilers acquired future Hall of Fame defensive tackle Curley Culp and a first-round draft choice in 1975 from the Kansas City Chiefs for John Matuszak (each player had threatened to jump to the World Football League). They then won four games in a row to get to 5–5 before trading wins and losses in the last four games of the year, which included a win over the Cleveland Browns to close the season at 7-7 (.500), their first non-losing season in four years. He was awarded the AFC Coach of the Year by UPI after the season before electing to move back to the GM position while Phillips was promoted to head coach.

The matter of who would address specific personnel decisions proved key in Gilman’s eventual departure. The contract that Phillips had signed with Gillman had a clause that gave him final approval of the moves that Phillips wanted to make, but Phillips asked that this clause be removed during a meeting between him and Adams when Gillman was out of town, which Adams accepted. Later, with the support of Adams, Phillips had Gillman barred from being able to attend practice or be in the locker room. Gillman appealed to Adams about the changes but resigned when Adams sided with Phillips, who was later quoted as stating "I had control of the team. I had the right to draft, waive, trade. I had the control I needed. That's what [Gillman] gave me. I told Sid that's what I wanted, and he said that was fine. We didn't have any disagreement over that. Evidently, the disagreement was with Bud. “There was a whole lot of stories running around, I guess. Believe me, I'm telling you what happened. I worked for [Gillman] for six years, and I enjoyed it for six years. If he wanted to draft somebody that I didn't want to draft, we wouldn't have drafted him. I had no problem with knowing my responsibilities." With Phillips at the helm and a defensive front that would have Culp for years to come alongside that draft choice used to draft future Hall of Fame linebacker Robert Brazile, the Oilers jumped to ten wins in the following season (1975).

==== Chicago Bears, USIU, and Philadelphia Eagles ====
In 1977, Gillman was hired as offensive coordinator for the Chicago Bears. The Bears, with Walter Payton leading the way in rushing yards (1,852), won 9 games and earned their first postseason appearance in 14 years, which ended in a loss in the Divisional Round. However, Gillman resigned after the year when his ideas about opening up the offense was rejected. For four months of 1978, Gillman was the coach of the football team at United States International University; one of the coaches he hired was Tom Walsh, who would coach the team when Gillman left in early 1979.

Philadelphia Eagles coach Dick Vermeil hired Gillman in 1979 to take over an offense ranked 27th, 19th, and 18th the previous three seasons. In Gillman's three years under Vermeil, the Eagles scored the 3rd-most points in the NFL, won the 2nd-most games, reached the playoffs all three seasons, and reached their first Super Bowl in 1980, with Vermeil stating that the appearance in the Super Bowl would not have happened without the "encyclopedia" knowledge of Gillman. He had retired after the 1980 season as “Physically and mentally drained" before returning in 1982 to the Eagles. Eagles quarterback Ron Jaworski considered Gilman his closest mentor. At this point in his career, Gillman was the measured buffer between Jaworski and the hard-driving intense Vermeil. Gillman taught Jaworski and future Hall of Fame receiver Harold Carmichael their signature "meet me at the corner" play.

==== United States Football League ====
In July 1983, at age 71, Gillman came out of retirement after an offer from Bill Tatham Sr. and Bill Tatham Jr., owners of the United States Football League (USFL) expansion team the Oklahoma Outlaws. Gillman agreed to serve as director of operations and signed quarterback Doug Williams, who later led the Washington Redskins to victory in Super Bowl XXII. Although Gillman signed a roster of players to play for the Tulsa, Oklahoma-based franchise, he was fired by Tatham six months later in a dispute over finances.

Gillman then served as a consultant for the USFL's Los Angeles Express in 1984, where John Hadl was the coach and future Hall of Famer Steve Young was the quarterback. He later did work for the Eagles as a quarterback coach in 1985 (Randall Cunningham's rookie year) before serving as an unpaid consultant to the University of Pittsburgh (Pitt) football team (as coached by Mike Gottfried) in 1987, earning a game ball after Pitt upset Notre Dame.

==== Post-retirement ====
Even when he was out of coaching/consulting after his year at Pitt in 1987 (or by 1991), Gillman was still at the helm of looking at tapes of game film, with a number of teams regularly sending him coaching tapes for him to view through multiple VCRs.

== Legacy ==
Gillman's innovations in passing offense are often praised as the foundation of modern football, but "Perhaps his most lasting legacy was his use of film to study players and formations...." Always deeply interested in the game, while working as one of his family's movie theater ushers, he removed football segments from newsreels the theater would show, so that he could take them home and study them on a projector he had bought. This dedication to filmed football plays made Gillman the first coach to study game footage, something that all coaches do today.

Gillman's influence on the modern game can be seen by listing the current and former coaches and executives who either played with him or coached for him, or coached under such people, including among others:

- George Blackburn, former coach for Miami (OH), Cincinnati, and Virginia
- Paul Dietzel, played and coached under Gillman, head coach at Louisiana State University, Army, South Carolina
- Frank Clair, who coached the Toronto Argonauts and Ottawa Rough Riders of the Canadian Football League to a total of five Grey Cup championships (played under Frances Schmidt 1938-40, and coached under Gilman at Miami)
- Al Davis, late coach and owner of the Los Angeles/Oakland Raiders
- Chuck Noll, coached the Pittsburgh Steelers to four Super Bowl titles
- Ara Parseghian, former coach at the University of Notre Dame who led the Fighting Irish to two national titles
- Bo Schembechler, former coach at the University of Michigan
- Bill Walsh, who coached the San Francisco 49ers to three Super Bowl titles (coached under John Rauch at Oakland, who had coached under Al Davis, who owned the Raiders when Walsh coached there and who coached under Gillman)
- Chuck Knox, former head coach of Los Angeles Rams, Buffalo Bills and Seattle Seahawks
- Dick Vermeil, coached the St. Louis Rams to a Super Bowl title and the Philadelphia Eagles to the Super Bowl (as head coach worked with Gillman as his assistant coach)
- George Allen, coached under Gillman in 1957, former coach of the Los Angeles Rams and Washington Redskins
- Bum Phillips who coached for Gillman for 5 years in San Diego prior to coaching for him in Houston

=== Coaching tree ===
Sid Gillman
George Allen	Al Davis	Chuck Knox	Bum Phillips	Dick Vermeil (1)	Chuck Noll (4)
John Madden (1)	Tom Flores (2)	Art Shell	Bill Walsh (3)	Joe Bugel / Joe Gibbs (3)	Tony Dungy (1)
Jim Fassel	Paul Hackett	Mike Holmgren (1)	Sam Wyche	George Seifert (2)	Dennis Green
John Fox	Mike McCarthy (1)	Bruce Coslet	Mike Mularkey	Brian Billick (1)	Mike Tice
Scott Linehan
Jon Gruden (1)	Mike Sherman	Ray Rhodes	Steve Mariucci	Andy Reid (3)	Mike Shanahan (2)	Jeff Fisher
Bill Callahan	Marty Mornhinweg	Gary Kubiak (1)	Jack Del Rio	Mike Smith	Vic Fangio
Brad Childress	John Harbaugh (1)	Ron Rivera	Doug Pederson (1)	Sean McDermott	Pat Shurmur	Jim Caldwell	Mike Tomlin (1)	Lovie Smith	Rod Marinelli
Brian Daboll	Bruce Arians (1)

Numbers in parentheses indicate Super Bowls won by Gillman's "descendants" as head coach, a total of 29.

Don Coryell, the coach at San Diego State University when Gillman was coaching the San Diego Chargers, would bring his team to Chargers' practices to watch how Gillman ran his practices. Coryell went on to coach in the NFL, and some of his assistants, influenced by the Gillman style, included coaches Joe Gibbs, Ernie Zampese, Tom Bass, and Russ A. Molzahn. A larger and more extended version of Sid Gillman's coaching tree, which in some ways could be called a forest, can be found here.

== Head coaching record ==
=== College ===
Year	Team	Overall	Conference	Standing	Bowl/playoffs
Miami Redskins (Independent) (1944–1947)
1944	Miami	8–1			
1945	Miami	7–2			
1946	Miami	7–3			
1947	Miami	9–0–1			W Sun
Miami:		31–6–1			
Cincinnati Bearcats (Mid-American Conference) (1949–1952)
1949	Cincinnati	7–4	4–0	1st	
1950	Cincinnati	8–4	3–1	2nd	L Sun
1951	Cincinnati	10–1	3–0	1st	
1952	Cincinnati	8–1–1	3–0	1st	
Cincinnati Bearcats (Independent) (1953–1954)
1953	Cincinnati	9–1			
1954	Cincinnati	8–2			
Cincinnati:		50–13–1	13–1		
Total:		81–19–2			
National championship Conference title Conference division title or championship game berth

=== AFL/NFL ===
Team	Year	Regular season					Postseason			
Team	Year	Won	Lost	Ties	Win %	Finish	Won	Lost	Win %	Result
LAR	1955	8	3	1	.727	1st in NFL Western Conference	0	1	.000	Lost to Cleveland Browns in NFL Championship
LAR	1956	4	8	0	.333	T-5th in NFL Western Conference	-	-	-	
LAR	1957	6	6	0	.500	4th in NFL Western Conference	-	-	-	
LAR	1958	8	4	0	.667	T-2nd in NFL Western Conference	-	-	-	
LAR	1959	2	10	0	.200	6th in NFL Western Conference	-	-	-	
LAR total		28	31	1	.475		0	1	.000	
LAC	1960	10	4	0	.714	1st in AFL West Division	0	1	.000	Lost to Houston Oilers in AFL championship game
SD	1961	12	2	0	.857	1st in AFL West Division	0	1	.000	Lost to Houston Oilers in AFL championship game
SD	1962	4	10	0	.286	4th in AFL West Division	-	-	-	
SD	1963	11	3	0	.786	1st in AFL West Division	1	0	1.000	Beat Boston Patriots in AFL championship game
SD	1964	8	5	1	.615	1st in AFL West Division	0	1	.000	Lost to Buffalo Bills in AFL championship game
SD	1965	9	2	3	.818	1st in AFL West Division	0	1	.000	Lost to Buffalo Bills in AFL championship game
SD	1966	7	6	1	.538	3rd in AFL West Division	-	-	-	
SD	1967	8	5	1	.615	3rd in AFL West Division	-	-	-	
SD	1968	9	5	0	.643	3rd in AFL West Division	-	-	-	
SD	1969	4	5	0	.444	3rd in AFL West Division	-	-	-	
SD	1971	4	6	0	.440	3rd in AFL West Division	-	-	-	
LAC/SD total		86	53	6	.619		1	4	.200	
HOU	1973	1	8	0	.111	4th in AFC Central	-	-	-	
HOU	1974	7	7	0	.500	2nd in AFC Central	-	-	-	
HOU total		8	15	0	.348		-	-	-	
Professional total		122	99	7	.552		1	5	.167	

== Awards and honors ==
Gillman has received the following awards and honors, among others;

- Gillman was inducted into the Pro Football Hall of Fame in 1983
- He was inducted into the College Football Hall of Fame in 1989
- He was inducted into the Ohio State Hall of Fame in 1981
- He was inducted into the University of Cincinnati James P. Kelly Athletics Hall of Fame in 1981
- He was inducted into the Chargers Football Hall of Fame in 1985
- He was inducted into the Southern California Jewish Sports Hall of Fame in 1990
- He was inducted into the Miami University Hall of Fame in 1991

== Personal life and death ==
Gillman and his wife Esther had four children and were married for 67 years (until his death). They resided in Carlsbad, California before moving in 2001 to Century City in Los Angeles.

On January 3, 2003, Gillman died in his sleep at age 91. He was interred in the Hillside Memorial Park Cemetery in Culver City, California.

== See also ==
- List of American Football League players
- List of National Football League head coaches with 50 wins
- List of select Jewish football players
