= Fake field goal =

Trick play in American football

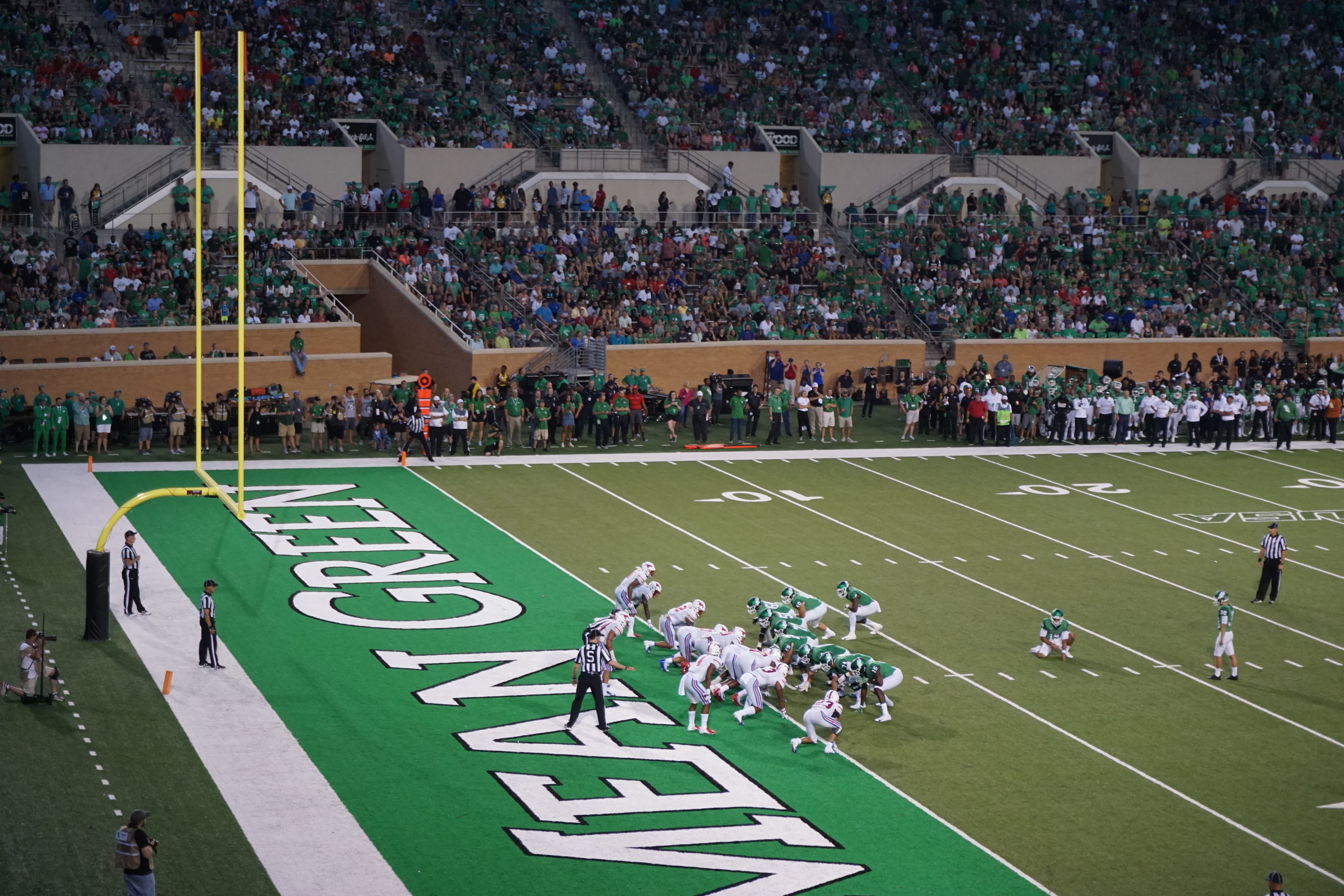
The North Texas Mean Green (in green) lined up for a field goal attempt. A fake field goal typically involves the holder (kneeling) or placekicker (at far right) attempting a pass or rush.

A fake field goal is a trick play in American football. It involves a running or passing play executed from a field goal formation. Usually, the holder (often the punter or backup quarterback) will throw the ball or run with it. Less frequently, the placekicker, who virtually never handles the ball in an American football game, will serve as the passer or rusher.

== Description ==
During a fake field goal, most teams will choose one of two different alignment options. The first is out of a normal field goal formation. The holder receives the snap and can either pitch it to the kicker, throw it during a designed pass play, or run with the ball. The second option is to shift into a special formation just before the ball is snapped, from which a variety of plays can be attempted.

The same concept can be used during a conversion (extra point) attempt, although it is more likely to occur in college football since 2015 when the National Football League (NFL) increased the distance from which an extra point is attempted.

There are some advantages to running a fake field goal or extra point. If it is a field goal, the team has the chance to either score a touchdown or extend a drive (if the ball is advanced enough yards for a first down). On an extra point attempt, the team has the chance of scoring two points instead of one, as it is a two-point conversion if completed successfully.

== Examples ==
Players who executed fake field goal include Danny White, both the quarterback and punter for the Dallas Cowboys in the 1980s; New England Patriots kicker Adam Vinatieri who received a direct snap and threw a touchdown pass during an NFL game in 2004; and LSU Tigers kicker Colt David who rushed for a 15-yard touchdown in 2007 after receiving the ball on a blind lateral from holder and starting quarterback Matt Flynn.

Not every fake field goal play call results in an attempted trick play. In the Week 8 game of the 2014 NFL season between the Indianapolis Colts and Pittsburgh Steelers, the Colts staff had determined, through film study, that the Steelers’ usual kick block formation when the ball was close to the end zone and on the left hash mark, would not be able to prevent the holder from running the ball in for a touchdown. Such a situation developed with one second left on the clock in the second quarter. However, instead of lining up a normally, Pittsburgh's Troy Polamalu, an eight-time Pro-Bowl and six-time All-Pro safety, shifted from his usual position, and filled the gap where Indianapolis holder Pat McAfee intended to run the ball. McAfee noticed this, aborted the trick play, and called for a normal field goal, which the Colts completed successfully.
