= Booker Edgerson =

American football player (born 1939)

No. 24
- Position: Cornerback

Personal information
- Born: July 5, 1939 (age 87); Baxter County, Arkansas, U.S.
- Listed height: 5 ft 10 in (1.78 m)
- Listed weight: 183 lb (83 kg)

Career information
- High school: Rock Island (Rock Island, Illinois)
- College: Western Illinois
- NFL draft: 1962: undrafted

Career history
- Buffalo Bills (1962–1969); Denver Broncos (1970)

Awards and highlights
- 2× AFL champion (1964, 1965); Second-team All-AFL (1969); AFL All-Star (1965); AFL All Rookie Team (1962); Buffalo Bills Wall of Fame

Career AFL/NFL statistics
- Interceptions: 23
- Interception yards: 421
- Fumble recoveries: 8
- Defensive touchdowns: 3
- Stats at Pro Football Reference

Booker Tyrone Edgerson Jr. (born July 5, 1939) is an American former professional football player who was a cornerback in the American Football League (AFL) and National Football League (NFL). He played college football for the Western Illinois Leathernecks. Edgerson played under coaches Lou Saban and Joe Collier in college and professional football. He became a cornerstone of the AFL's Buffalo Bills' defense in the mid-1960s, at left cornerback. He was an AFL-All Star in 1965, and played on two AFL championship teams during the 1964 and 1965 seasons.

== Early life ==
Edgerson was born on July 5, 1939, in Baxter County, Arkansas. He attended Rock Island High School, in Rock Island, Illinois, where he was a member of the football and track teams. He was a halfback on the school's football team, and rushed for 222 yards on 18 carries in one game during his senior year (1957). He was the only junior to be selected first-team All-Quad-City in 1956, after leading the conference in rushing with 882 yards on 94 carries (9.3 yards per carry) and setting a Rockland rushing record. He was second-team All-Quad-City in 1957. In 1957, he rushed for 563 yards (6.4 yards per carry), after missing the season's first two games.

Edgerson was a sprinter on Rock Island's track and field team. In April 1956, he was part of the sprint medley team that won the Davenport Relays. In 1957, he was a leader in the Quad-City Conference in the 100–yard dash, 220–yard dash, and the broad jump. In 1958, he was second statewide in the broad jump.

== College career ==
Edgerson was recruited by at least 12 Division I college football programs, but strongly disliked school and originally intended to join the United States Marines after graduating high school. Those plans changed, and he instead attended Western Illinois University. Western Illinois was not a member of the National Collegiate Athletic Association (NCAA) at the time Edgerson entered his freshman year. Edgerson did not have a scholarship and personally paid for his freshman year of college. Edgerson became a four-year letterman at Western Illinois in football, baseball, wrestling, and track and field.

Edgerson tried out and became a member of the school's football team as a freshman (1958), under head coach Lou Saban and Rock Island native, defensive assistant coach Joel Collier; both of whom would later coach Edgerson in the AFL and NFL. In 1959, Edgerson was playing as a defensive back. He helped Western Illinois finish 9–0 that season, outscoring their opponents, 303–110. United Press International ranked them sixth among small colleges in its final national poll. Again at defensive back in 1960, he helped Western Illinois to another undefeated season; the only consecutive undefeated seasons in school history. He was also a punter that season.

Edgerson played on offense in 1961 at running back. He originally played behind Leroy Jackson, but then became a starter halfway through the season; averaging 7.7 yards per carry, with 310 yards.

In April 1960, Edgerson won the broad jump in the Iowa Teachers Relays. He set a State College Relays broad jump record in 1960. He is reported to have run the 100–yard dash in 9.7 seconds.

== Professional career ==
=== Buffalo Bills ===
Edgerson was not drafted out of college. By 1962, Saban had left Western Illinois to coach the Boston Patriots of the American Football League (AFL). Saban secretly signed Edgerson to a contract in the winter of 1962, not making it public so that Edgerson would be eligible to play spring college baseball. Saban was fired before the 1962 season started, and was hired by the Buffalo Bills. Edgerson attempted to try out for the Chicago Bears after college, but Bears' coach George Halas told the 5 ft 10 in (1.78 m) 175 lb (79.4 kg) Edgerson that he was too small for the NFL; though Edgerson believed it was actually because he was only a free agent from a small college. Edgerson then pursued playing for the Oakland Raiders, but coach Al Davis was not interested in Edgerson either. Saban contacted Edgerson concerning what he should do about the Patriots contract, and Edgerson told Saban to tear it up. Edgerson then signed a contract to join head coach Saban, defensive backs coach Collier, and the Bills. He signed with the Bills in late June, Saban stating he was going to use Edgerson on defense.

As a rookie in 1962, Edgerson started 13 games for the Bills at right cornerback and free safety. The team's veterans refused to help him learn the cornerback position out of fear he might take their jobs; a fact that Edgerson believed limited his potential over time by making him more cautious than he otherwise might have been. By contrast, when future All-Star cornerback Butch Byrd joined the Bills in 1964, Edgerson taught him how to better play the position. Edgerson had a career-high six interceptions in 1962, including two in his first game, against future Hall of Fame quarterback George Blanda. Edgerson was named to the AFL All-Rookie team.

It has been reported that Edgerson was the Bills' starting left cornerback in 1963, and alternatively reported that he was the starting right cornerback. He started in 13 regular season games that season, with one interception in 1963. The Bills lost a playoff game to the Boston Patriots, 26–8. Egerson started the game at right cornerback.

In 1964, he started 10 games at left cornerback, with four interceptions. On November 1, he once again intercepted a George Blanda pass against the Oilers, returning it for 91 yards. The Bills won the first nine games of the 1964 season, losing in the 10th game to the Patriots, 38–26. Edgerson suffered a season-ending injury to his right knee in that game. He was replaced by Charley Warner and Oliver Dobbins at left cornerback for the final four games of the regular season. The Bills won the 1964 AFL Championship Game over the San Diego Chargers, 20–7, with Warner starting at left cornerback.

Edgerson had knee surgery after the 1964 season. Warner started the 1965 season at left cornerback. Edgerson returned as a starter in the season's sixth game, a 23–7 win over the Kansas City Chiefs. He had two interceptions in that game. He started the remaining eight regular season games, with three more interceptions. Edgerson was selected to play in the AFL All-Star game that season, for the first and only time in his career.

In a late November 1965 tie game against the Chargers, Edgerson accomplished the rare, and possibly unique feat, of catching and tackling future Hall of Fame receiver Lance Alworth from behind. Edgerson had been five yards behind Alworth during the play before eventually catching Alworth. The field was reportedly wet, with some pooling of water on it that day. He caught Alworth at Buffalo’s three yard line, after Alworth had run 65 yards with a pass reception. Edgerson's tackle caused Alworth to fumble the ball into the end zone, resulting in a touchback when another Bills' player recovered the ball.

The Bills had a 10–3–1 record that season, and again played the Chargers in the AFL Championship Game, winning the AFL championship 23–0. Edgerson was the Bills' starting left cornerback in the game. Defensive coach Joe Collier devised a strategy to use double coverage against Alworth on every play. Edgerson was teamed with either strong safety Hagood Clarke or free safety George Saimes throughout the game in double covering Alworth on every play. Saban left the Bills to become head coach of the Denver Broncos in 1966, and Collier became the Bills head coach from 1966 to 1968 (before joining Saban as defensive backs coach in Denver in 1969).

In a late August 1966 exhibition game, Edgerson suffered a left knee injury that required surgery. He started only two games in 1966, and was replaced by Tom Janik who had eight interceptions that season. Later in the season, the team's doctors declared Edgerson capable of playing, but he could not regain his starting position over Janik; to which Edgerson observed, "They don't have to run on my knee". The Bills reached the 1966 AFL Championship Game, losing 31–7 to the Kansas City Chiefs. Janik started at left cornerback over Edgerson in that game.

In 1967, Edgerson started all 14 games at left cornerback, with two interceptions on the season. Janik became the Bills' strong safety, and had 10 interceptions in 10 starts. The Bills were 4–10 that season. In 1968, Edgerson started 12 games at left cornerback, with four interceptions. The Bills were 1–12–1 on the season. In the Bills only win that season, on September 29, Edgerson intercepted a pass by future Hall of Fame quarterback Joe Namath and returned it 45 yards for a touchdown against the eventual Super Bowl III champion New York Jets. It was one of three Bills' interceptions returned for touchdowns in that game. In a late November game against the Denver Broncos, Edgerson intercepted a Marlin Briscoe pass and returned it 35 yards for a touchdown. He tied for the AFL league lead in interceptions returned for touchdowns that season.

In 1969, the AFL's final season and Edgerson's final season with the Bills, he started all 14 games at left cornerback. He had one interception and four fumble recoveries. United Press International named Edgerson second-team All-AFL in 1969. During that season, the Bills played a November 30 game against the Cincinnati Bengals in Buffalo under extreme weather conditions of cold, ice, and snow. Bengals' coach Paul Brown said it was the worst weather conditions for a game he had ever seen in his 35 years of coaching. Bills' placekicker Bruce Alford, from Texas, said he "never saw such weather, much less played in it" (though he was able to kick three field goals in the game).

Edgerson recovered two fumbles in the November 1969 Bengals' game. He scored the Bills' only, and game-winning, touchdown after a fumble recovery at the Bengals' 10-yard line. Edgerson had correctly diagnosed a rollout play being run by Bengals' quarterback Greg Cook, but wound up sliding backwards into Cook instead of making a normal tackle. Edgerson pulled the ball from Cook's grasp as the two players experienced precarious footing on the slippery field and became intertwined. Cincinnati Enquirer sportswriter Dick Forbes wrote "Edgerson's touchdown theft was the climax of a long afternoon of errors for the Bengals in a wild and ridiculous scramble played in a raging blizzard, in 25-degree temperature, on a field six inches deep in snow". Edgerson was awarded the game ball.

During his eight-year career in Buffalo, Edgerson started 87 of the 100 regular season games in which he appeared, with 23 interceptions. He started two playoff games for the Bills (1963 and 1965), including the 1965 AFL Championship Game; and also played in the 1966 AFL Championship Game.

=== Denver Broncos ===
At the end of August 1970, the Bills traded Edgerson to the Denver Broncos for a future draft pick. Saban was still the head coach in Denver and Collier was the Broncos' defensive backs coach. Edgerson played in only six games as a reserve defensive back for the Broncos before suffering a season- and career-ending injury, in an October 25 game against the San Francisco 49ers; with ligament damage to his knee that required surgery the next day.

== Personal life ==
During the offseasons, Edgerson worked as a school teacher, among other jobs. After retiring from professional football, Edgerson continued to live in Buffalo. He worked as an assistant director with CETA (Comprehensive Employment and Training Act) in Erie County, New York; and then worked for 23 years as director of equity and diversity at Erie Community College (now SUNY Erie). Edgerson also worked for the telephone company, and operated a travel agency for a few years before filing for bankruptcy in 1974. He then became a special consultant to the city of Buffalo, to assess the feasibility of renovating War Memorial Stadium. In 1978, he started working as a marketing representative for IBM.

Edgerson has been involved in numerous charitable endeavors in Buffalo, through the Bills Alumni. He worked with the National Alliance of Businessmen (NAB) on a program to help ex-convicts find employment.

Edgerson wrote the foreword to The Cookie That Did Not Crumble, the autobiography of his former teammate, Cookie Gilchrist, co-written by Chris Garbarino. Edgerson says in the forward "Cookie stood out like a giant . . . He looked like the Greek god Zeus had chiseled him out of the Rock of Gibraltar".

== Legacy and honors ==
The AFL featured many dangerous receivers during Edgerson's career, including Hall of Fame receivers Don Maynard and Lance Alworth, among others. Maynard and Alworth told Edgerson he was the toughest cornerback they played against. Edgerson was possibly the only defender ever to catch the fast Alworth from behind in a game. In 1964, the Bills' defense gave up the fewest points, total yards, and rushing yards of any AFL team, and Edgerson was one of the key components of arguably the league's best defense, before his injury that season. His college background as a sprinter and long jumper served him well in the demanding role of man-to-man pass coverage.

Edgerson was the 1993 recipient of the Buffalo Bills Ralph C. Wilson Distinguished Service Award. In 2001, he was inducted into the Greater Buffalo Sports Hall of Fame. In 2010, Edgerson joined eight former Bills teammates in becoming the 26th Bill added to the Buffalo Bills Wall of Fame. He was presented with this honor during a halftime ceremony of an October 3 game between the Bills and their longtime AFC rival New York Jets. Edgerson called it one of the greatest days of his life. He was inducted into the Quad-Cities Sports Hall of Fame in 1998. In 1996, he was inducted into Western Illinois University's Athletic Hall of Fame. Edgerson also became president of the Bills alumni association.

Edgerson credits his college and professional head coach Lou Saban with making his career possible, and called Saban "the highlight of my life" because of the opportunities he provided to Edgerson. When Saban died in 2009, Edgerson said "He was like a father to me . . . He steered me in the right direction. He gave me advice. Some of it I didn't like, but isn't that what a father does?" When his former college and professional defensive and head coach Joe Collier died in 2024, Edgerson said "The guy was outstanding . . . I don't like to call people geniuses. But he just knew things. He showed you things. He knew what people had the ability to do. Everything that he pointed out during the week would come true, and it made you a better ball player".

== Career statistics ==
Legend
	Won the AFL championship
	Led the league
**Bold**	Career high

Year	Team	Games		Interceptions					Fumbles			
Year	Team	GP	GS	Int	Yds	Y/I	Lng	TD	FR	Yds	Y/F	TD
1962	BUF	14	14	**6**	111	18.5	40	0	0	0	0.0	0
1963	BUF	14	14	1	0	0.0	0	0	2	0	0.0	0
1964	BUF	10	10	4	**130**	**32.5**	**91**	0	1	3	3.0	0
1965	BUF	14	9	5	55	11.0	19	0	0	0	0.0	0
1966	BUF	7	2	0	0	0.0	0	0	0	0	0.0	0
1967	BUF	14	14	2	25	12.5	25	0	0	0	0.0	0
1968	BUF	13	13	4	100	25.0	45	**2**	0	0	0.0	0
1969	BUF	14	14	1	0	0.0	0	0	**4**	**39**	**9.8**	**1**
1970	DEN	6	0	0	0	0.0	0	0	1	0	0.0	0
Career		106	90	23	421	18.3	91	2	8	42	5.3	1

== See also ==
- List of American Football League players
