= Joe Collier =

American football coach (1932–2024)

Personal information
- Born: June 7, 1932; Rock Island, Illinois, U.S.
- Died: May 6, 2024 (aged 91); Littleton, Colorado, U.S.

Career information
- High school: Rock Island
- College: Northwestern
- NFL draft: 1954: 22nd round, 257th overall pick

Career history
- Western Illinois (1957–1959) Assistant coach; Boston Patriots (1960–1961) Assistant coach; Buffalo Bills (1962-1965) Linebackers and defensive backs coach; Buffalo Bills (1966-1968) Head coach; Denver Broncos (1969-1971) Defensive backs coach; Denver Broncos (1972–1988) Defensive coordinator; New England Patriots (1991–1992) Defensive coordinator

Awards and highlights
- 2× AFL champion (1964, 1965); 2× First-team All-American (1952, 1953); First-team All-Big Ten (1952); Colorado Sports Hall of Fame (2002)

Head coaching record
- Regular season: 13–16–1 (.450)
- Postseason: 0–1 (.000)
- Career: 13–17–1 (.435)
- Coaching profile at Pro Football Reference

Joel Dale Collier (June 7, 1932 – May 6, 2024) was an American professional football coach who was the head coach of the Buffalo Bills of the American Football League (AFL) from 1966 through part of 1968, compiling a 13–16–1 record. He later coached in the National Football League (NFL). He played college football for the Northwestern Wildcats, earning first-team All-American honors in 1952 and 1953.

== College career ==
Collier attended Northwestern University, where he played on the Northwestern Wildcats football team. In 1952, his junior season, he broke Big Ten Conference records by catching seven touchdown passes and accumulating 650 receiving yards. He was named to the 1952 College Football All-America Team. Following the 1953 college football season, in which he captained the Wildcats and again earned All-American honors, Collier was selected 257th overall by the New York Giants in the 22nd round of the 1954 NFL draft. However, Collier decided not to play professional football, instead becoming an assistant coach at Western Illinois University after a three-year stint in the U.S. Army. Collier spent three seasons as a Western Illinois assistant, from 1957 to 1959.

== Buffalo Bills (1962–1968) ==
After spending two seasons as an assistant coach with the Boston Patriots of the brand new AFL, Collier joined the Buffalo Bills in 1962 as a defensive coach. The team won the 1965 AFL Championship Game over the San Diego Chargers with help from defensive alignments that Collier designed. One idea he came up with was similar to the modern zone blitz; Collier's defense featured defensive line players moving back to cover pass attempts. Collier was promoted to head coach in 1966, after previous coach Lou Saban resigned. The Bills' best season under Collier came in his first year, when they won the Eastern Division with a 9–4–1 record, eventually losing to the Kansas City Chiefs in the AFL Championship Game. After coming within one game of an AFL championship, the team slumped to 4–10 in 1967. After a poor performance by the Bills in a 1968 pre-season game, Collier set up a scrimmage for his team. During the practice session, quarterback Jack Kemp broke his right leg, an injury that forced him to undergo season-ending surgery. The Bills fired Collier after a 48–6 loss to the Oakland Raiders in the second week of the regular season. Sports Illustrated opined that "Collier's fate undoubtedly was decided..." by Kemp's injury.

== Denver Broncos (1969–1988) ==
Following his time as head coach of the Bills, Collier became a Denver Broncos coach in 1969 and spent 20 years with the team, which reached three Super Bowls with him as defensive coordinator. Collier was the architect of the Broncos' 3–4 defense in the late 1970s, a scheme that was known as the Orange Crush Defense. Although he preferred to set up the Broncos' defense with four linemen, Collier occasionally organized a 3–4 defense experimentally. After an injury to Lyle Alzado early in the 1976 season, Collier used the system more regularly and improved upon it: author Terry Frei called him "the scientist in the laboratory, coming up with ways to make the defense even better." After being hired by Saban, he remained the defensive coordinator for four subsequent Broncos head coaches. Dan Reeves fired Collier after the 1988 NFL season.

== New England Patriots (1991–1992) ==
From 1991 to 1992, he was defensive coordinator for the New England Patriots. Collier took over a Patriots defense that had given up the second-most points in the league during a 1–15 season in 1990. However, Collier's first year saw the Patriots defense improve from second-worst in the league (out of 28 teams) to the middle of the pack (15th). Helping the Patriots' improved rankings was that their run defense, which was last in the league in 1990, improved to 9th in the league in 1991.

The Patriots failed to build on their 1991 defensive performance, as the unit finished 23rd overall during the 1992 season. New England ended up 2–14, winning four fewer games than they had in 1991. After his stint with the Patriots ended, Collier retired from the NFL.

== Personal life ==
Joel Dale Collier was born in Rock Island, Illinois, on June 7, 1932. He was married to Shirley Ann Ketelaar from 1957 until her death in 2006. They had three children: Joel, Julie, and Lisa. Joel was hired in February 2009 by Kansas City Chiefs general manager Scott Pioli, a former executive for the Patriots, as a defensive backs coach for Chiefs head coach Todd Haley. By 2010, he was the team's assistant general manager. Prior to 2009, Collier was the secondary coach of the New England Patriots. Before his stint with the Patriots, he spent 11 years as an assistant for the Miami Dolphins.

Collier lived with longtime partner Sue Henry. He died in Littleton, Colorado, on May 6, 2024, at the age of 91. In 2002, the Colorado Sports Hall of Fame inducted Collier.

At the time of Collier's death, Booker Edgerson, whom Collier had coached at Western Illinois University, and with the Buffalo Bills and Denver Broncos, said of Collier: "The guy was outstanding . . . I don't like to call people geniuses. But he just knew things. He showed you things. He knew what people had the ability to do. Everything that he pointed out during the week would come true, and it made you a better ball player".

== Head coaching record ==
Team	Year	Regular season					Postseason			
Team	Year	Won	Lost	Ties	Win %	Finish	Won	Lost	Win %	Result
BUF	1966	9	4	1	.692	1st in AFL East	0	1	.000	Lost to Kansas City Chiefs in AFL Championship.
BUF	1967	4	10	0	.286	3rd in AFL East	–	–	–	–
BUF	1968	0	2	0	.000	5th in AFL East	–	–	–	–
BUF Total		13	16	1	.448		0	1	.000	–
AFL Total		13	16	1	.448		0	1	.000	–
Total		13	16	1	.448		0	1	.000	–
