= Hagood Clarke =

American football player (born 1942)

No. 45
- Position: Safety

Personal information
- Born: June 14, 1942 (age 84); Atlanta, Georgia, U.S.
- Listed height: 5 ft 11 in (1.80 m)
- Listed weight: 217 lb (98 kg)

Career information
- High school: Chattanooga (TN) Baylor
- College: Florida
- NFL draft: 1964: 7th round, 85th overall pick
- AFL draft: 1964: 18th round, 141st overall pick

Career history
- Buffalo Bills (1964–1968)

Awards and highlights
- 2× AFL championship (1964, 1965); All-AFL (1966); AFL All-Star (1965); University of Florida Athletic Hall of Fame

Career AFL statistics
- Interceptions: 12
- Interception return yards: 178
- Touchdowns: 1
- Kick return yards: 330
- Punt return yards: 583
- Stats at Pro Football Reference

Hagood Clarke, III (born June 14, 1942) is an American former professional football player who was a defensive back for five seasons in the American Football League (AFL) during the 1960s. Clarke played college football for the Florida Gators, and thereafter, he played professionally for the Buffalo Bills of the AFL.

== Early life ==
Clarke was born in Atlanta, Georgia, in 1942. For his high school education, he attended Baylor School in Chattanooga, Tennessee, where he played high school football for the Baylor School Tigers.

== College career ==
Clarke attended the University of Florida in Gainesville, Florida, where he was a walk-on player for coach Ray Graves' Gators teams from 1961 to 1963. Clarke played both ways for the Gators, playing halfback on offense and safety on defense. Memorably, he caught a nineteen-yard touchdown pass to clinch the Gators' 17–7 upset win over the ninth-ranked Penn State Nittany Lions in the 1962 Gator Bowl, intercepted a third-quarter Joe Namath pass to help preserve a 10–6 upset of the third-ranked Alabama Crimson Tide in Tuscaloosa in 1963, and ran for a seventy-yard touchdown to provide the margin of victory in the Gators' 27–21 win over the Miami Hurricanes later that same season. He was also the Gators' principal punter in 1962, with forty-six punts for 1,884 yards (and average of 41.0 yards per kick). Clarke led the Gators in punt return yardage in 1961 and 1962, and was the recipient of the Gators' Fergie Ferguson Award, recognizing the "senior football player who displays outstanding leadership, courage and character," in 1963.

Clarke graduated from the University of Florida with a bachelor's degree in business administration in 1965, and was later inducted into the University of Florida Athletic Hall of Fame as a "Gator Great."

== Professional career ==
Clarke was selected by the San Francisco 49ers of the National Football League (NFL) in the seventh round (85th pick overall) of the 1964 NFL draft, but signed with coach Lou Saban's Buffalo Bills of the alternative AFL, and played his entire five-year career as a safety and punt returner for the Bills from 1964 to 1968. In his first three seasons with the Bills, the team won the AFL Championship Game in 1964 and 1965, and lost it in 1966. Statistically, Clarke's best season was 1965, when he had seven interceptions and played in the AFL All-Star Game. He also was an All-AFL 2nd team selection in 1966, when he had five interceptions, including an interception of a George Blanda pass followed by a 66-yard return for a touchdown in the final twenty-seven seconds to beat the Houston Oilers, 27–20. In 1968, his final season with the Bills, Clarke had an 82-yard punt return for a touchdown against the New York Jets.

Clark appeared in sixty-seven games in his five-season AFL career, and compiled twelve interceptions for 178 interception return yards and a touchdown. He also tallied sixty-five career punt returns for 583 yards and two touchdowns.

== Career statistics ==
Legend
	Won the AFL championship
	Led the league
**Bold**	Career high

Year	Team	Games		Interceptions					Fumbles				Punt returns					Kick returns				
Year	Team	GP	GS	Int	Yds	Y/I	Lng	TD	FR	Yds	Y/F	TD	Ret	Yds	Avg	Lng	TD	Ret	Yds	Avg	Lng	TD
1964	BUF	14	3	0	0	0.0	0	0	**1**	0	0.0	0	**33**	**317**	9.6	53	**1**	**16**	**330**	**20.6**	**41**	0
1965	BUF	14	11	**7**	60	8.6	40	0	**1**	**6**	**6.0**	0	1	13	**13.0**	13	0	—	—	—	—	—
1966	BUF	14	14	5	**118**	**23.6**	**66**	**1**	**1**	0	0.0	0	2	12	6.0	7	0	—	—	—	—	—
1967	BUF	11	4	0	0	0.0	0	0	0	0	0.0	0	—	—	—	—	—	—	—	—	—	—
1968	BUF	14	1	0	0	0.0	0	0	0	0	0.0	0	29	241	8.3	**82**	1	—	—	—	—	—
Career		67	33	12	178	14.8	66	1	3	6	2.0	0	65	583	9.0	82	2	16	330	20.6	41	0

== Life after football ==
Clarke is a financial consultant in Fort Lauderdale, Florida.

== See also ==
- Florida Gators football, 1960–69
- List of American Football League players
- List of Buffalo Bills players
- List of Florida Gators in the NFL draft
- List of University of Florida alumni
- List of University of Florida Athletic Hall of Fame members
