= 1967 Buffalo Bills season =

8th season in franchise history

- Owner: Ralph Wilson
- Head coach: Joe Collier
- Home stadium: War Memorial Stadium

Results
- Record: 4–10
- Division place: 3rd AFL Eastern
- Playoffs: Did not qualify

The 1967 Buffalo Bills season was the team's eighth season in the American Football League. It was the second season with the Bills for head coach Joe Collier.

Buffalo was coming off a season in which they were one game away from the first Super Bowl, but could only win four games in 1967. It was Buffalo's first losing season since 1961.

== Personnel ==
=== Staff/coaches ===
1967 Buffalo Bills staff
Front office: President/majority owner – Ralph Wilson; Vice-president/minority owner – Pat McGroder; Head coaches: Head coach – Joe Collier; Offensive coaches: Running backs/wide receivers – John Mazur; Offensive line – Jerry Smith	Defensive coaches: Linebackers/Defensive Backs – Richie McCabe

=== Final roster ===
1967 Buffalo Bills roster
Quarterbacks (QB): 16 Tom Flores; 15 Jack Kemp; Running backs (RB): 36 Charlie Bivins; 30 Wray Carlton; 34 Gene Donaldson; 20 Keith Lincoln; Wide receivers (WR): 44 Elbert Dubenion; 46 Tony King; 43 Monte Ledbetter; 48 John Pitts; 40 Ed Rutkowski; Tight ends (TE): 82 Paul Costa; 87 Billy Masters	Offensive linemen (OL): 77 Stew Barber T/G; 50 Al Bemiller C/T; 76 Gary Bugenhagen T; 62 Dick Cunningham T; 60 Jim LeMoine G; 67 Joe O'Donnell G; 57 Bob Schmidt C; 66 Billy Shaw G; Defensive linemen (DL): 78 Jim Dunaway DT; 73 Howard Kindig DE; 72 Ron McDole DE; 75 Dudley Meredith DT/DE; 65 Remi Prudhomme DE; 70 Tom Sestak DT; 81 Rich Zecher DE	Linebackers (LB): 59 Paul Guidry OLB; 55 Paul Maguire P/OLB; 56 Marty Schottenheimer MLB; 58 Mike Stratton OLB; 51 John Tracey OLB; Defensive backs (DB): 42 Butch Byrd CB; 45 Hagood Clarke SS; 24 Booker Edgerson CB; 27 Tom Janik SS; 47 Charlie King CB/S; 26 George Saimes FS; Special teams (ST): 7 Mike Mercer K	Practice squad: -- Dave Daniels DT; 23 Howard Finley S; 25 Tommy Luke S; 89 Tom Rhoads DE; 3 Benny Russell QB; 86 Jerry Seither TE; 88 Bill Wilkerson DE; Reserve: 21 Bobby Burnett RB; 83 Bobby Crockett WR (IR); 71 Wayne DeSutter T (IR); 80 Charley Ferguson (IR); 79 Dick Hudson T; 64 Harry Jacobs LB; 85 Bob Petrich DE; 84 Art Powell WR; 32 Jack Spikes RB; Rookies in italics

== Offseason ==
=== 1967 NFL/AFL draft ===
1967 Buffalo Bills draft
Round	Pick	Player	Position	College	Notes
1	22	John Pitts	DB	Arizona State	
2	42	Jim LeMoine	TE	Utah State	
3	70	Tom Rhoades	DE	Notre Dame	
4	102	Gary Bugenhagen	G	Syracuse	
6	149	Bill Wilkerson	DE	UTEP	
7	181	George Gaiser	T	SMU	
8	207	Tommy Luke	DB	Ole Miss	
9	233	Gerald Seither	E	Kent State	
10	259	Tom Croft	DB	Louisiana Tech	
11	284	Paul Tomich	T	Drake	
12	292	Ernie Ames	DT	Kent State	
12	311	Bob Bonner	DT	Southern	
13	318	Howard Finley	DB	Tennessee State	
13	319	George Carter	HB	St. Bonaventure	
13	337	Randy Wheeler	HB	Georgia	
14	362	Vern Moore	HB	Central State (OK)	
15	389	Grant Martinsen	DB	Utah State	
16	415	Mike Irwin	HB	Penn State	
17	441	Grover Smith	HB	Fort Valley State	
Made roster † Pro Football Hall of Fame * Made at least one Pro Bowl during career

== Regular season ==
=== Season schedule ===
Week	Date	Opponent	Result	Record	Venue	Attendance	Recap
1	Bye						
2	September 10	**New York Jets**	**W** 20–17	1–0	War Memorial Stadium	45,748	Recap
3	September 17	**Houston Oilers**	**L** 3–20	1–1	War Memorial Stadium	41,384	Recap
4	September 24	**Boston Patriots**	**L** 0–23	1–2	War Memorial Stadium	45,748	Recap
5	October 1	San Diego Chargers	**L** 17–37	1–3	War Memorial Stadium	39,310	Recap
6	October 8	at Denver Broncos	**W** 17–16	2–3	Bears Stadium	35,188	Recap
7	October 15	Oakland Raiders	**L** 20–24	2–4	War Memorial Stadium	45,758	Recap
8	Bye						
9	October 29	at **Houston Oilers**	**L** 3–10	2–5	Rice Stadium	30,060	Recap
10	November 5	**Miami Dolphins**	**W** 35–13	3–5	War Memorial Stadium	31,622	Recap
11	November 12	at **New York Jets**	**L** 10–20	3–6	Shea Stadium	62,671	Recap
12	November 19	Denver Broncos	**L** 20–21	3–7	War Memorial Stadium	30,891	Recap
13	November 26	at **Miami Dolphins**	**L** 14–17	3–8	Orange Bowl	27,050	Recap
14	December 3	at Kansas City Chiefs	**L** 13–23	3–9	Municipal Stadium	41,943	Recap
15	December 9	at **Boston Patriots**	**W** 44–16	4–9	Fenway Park	20,627	Recap
16	Bye						
17	December 24	at Oakland Raiders	**L** 21–28	4–10	Oakland–Alameda County Coliseum	30,738	Recap
Note: Intra-division opponents are in **bold** text.

=== Game summaries ===
==== Week 14 ====
Team	1	2	3	4	Total
Bills	10	0	3	8	21
• Raiders	7	7	7	7	28

- Date: December 24
- Location: Oakland–Alameda County Coliseum

== Standings ==
AFL Eastern Division
	W	L	T	PCT	DIV	PF	PA	STK
Houston Oilers	9	4	1	.692	5–1–1	258	199	W2
New York Jets	8	5	1	.615	5–1–1	371	329	W1
Buffalo Bills	4	10	0	.286	3–5	237	285	L1
Miami Dolphins	4	10	0	.286	2–6	219	407	L1
Boston Patriots	3	10	1	.231	3–5	280	389	L5

Note: Tie games were not officially counted in the standings in the AFL.
