= Ernie Warlick =

American gridiron football player (1932–2012)

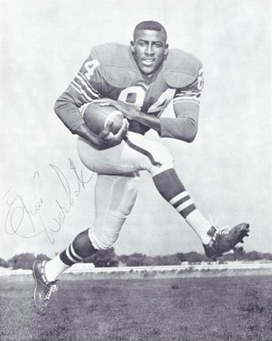

No. 75, 84
- Position: Tight end

Personal information
- Born: July 21, 1932; Washington, D.C., U.S.
- Died: November 24, 2012 (aged 80); Williamsville, New York, U.S.
- Listed height: 6 ft 3 in (1.91 m)
- Listed weight: 235 lb (107 kg)

Career information
- High school: Ridgeview (Hickory, North Carolina)
- College: North Carolina Central
- NFL draft: 1954: undrafted

Career history
- Calgary Stampeders (1957–1961); Buffalo Bills (1962–1965)

Awards and highlights
- 2× AFL champion (1964, 1965); 4× AFL All-Star (1962–1965); 3× CFL All-Star (1958–1960); Buffalo Bills Silver Anniversary Team

Career AFL statistics
- Receptions: 90
- Receiving yards: 1,551
- Receiving touchdowns: 4
- Stats at Pro Football Reference

Career CFL statistics
- Receptions: 202
- Receiving yards: 3,332
- Receiving touchdowns: 16

Ernest Warlick (July 21, 1932 – November 24, 2012), nicknamed "Big Hoss", was an American football tight end who played in the Canadian Football League (CFL) and the American Football League (AFL). He played college football for the North Carolina Central Eagles.

== Early life and college ==
Warlick was born in Washington, D.C. After starring at Ridgeview High School in Hickory, North Carolina, he played college football for the North Carolina Central Eagles.

== Professional career ==
Warlick played four seasons with the Calgary Stampeders of the Canadian Football League (CFL). He then joined the Buffalo Bills of the American Football League (AFL) in 1962. He had an average of 17.2 yards per catch with the Bills, while the team earned three straight Eastern Division titles and two AFL championships, and a 20.8 yards per catch average in 1964. In the same season, he helped the Bills win their first AFL championship game against the San Diego Chargers, 20–7, when he caught two passes for 41 yards. In the 1965 AFL championship, when guard Billy Shaw and center Dave Behrman were injured, Warlick helped bolster the Bills offensive blocking in a double tight end offense. In that game, he also scored the first touchdown in the Bills 23–0 victory over the Chargers, on an 18-yard pass from quarterback Jack Kemp.

1964 AFL Championship ring

He was selected to the AFL All-Star game every year he was in the league.

== After football ==
He was the first African-American sportscaster on Buffalo television, was elected to the Buffalo Broadcast Pioneers Hall of Fame in 1998, and received the Ralph C. Wilson Jr. Distinguished Service Award in 2000. In 2005, Warlick was inducted to North Carolina's Central Intercollegiate Athletic Association Hall of Fame, honoring his basketball and football accomplishments at North Carolina Central.

== See also ==
- Other American Football League players
