= Ollie Dobbins =

American football player (born 1941)

No. 25, 40, 21
- Position: Defensive back

Personal information
- Born: November 30, 1941 (age 84); Philadelphia, Pennsylvania, U.S.
- Listed height: 6 ft 0 in (1.83 m)
- Listed weight: 182 lb (83 kg)

Career information
- High school: West (Philadelphia)
- College: Morgan State (1960–1963)
- NFL draft: 1964: 18th round, 247th overall pick

Career history
- Buffalo Bills (1964); Wilmington Clippers (1966–1967); Harrisburg Capitol-Colts (1968); Pottstown Firebirds (1968–1969)

Awards and highlights
- AFL champion (1964)
- Stats at Pro Football Reference

Oliver Wendel Dobbins (born November 30, 1941) is an American former professional football defensive back who played one season with the Buffalo Bills of the American Football League (AFL). He was selected by the Pittsburgh Steelers in the eighteenth round of the 1964 NFL draft after playing college football at Morgan State University. He was a member of the Bills team that won the 1964 AFL championship.

== Early life and college ==
Oliver Wendel Dobbins was born on November 30, 1941, in Philadelphia, Pennsylvania. He attended West Philadelphia High School in Philadelphia.

Dobbins was a member of the Morgan State Bears of Morgan State University from 1960 to 1963. He was inducted into the school's athletics hall of fame in 1977.

== Professional career ==
Dobbins was selected by the Pittsburgh Steelers in the 18th round, with the 247th overall pick, of the 1964 NFL draft. However, he instead signed with the Buffalo Bills of the American Football League. He played in all 14 games, starting one, for the Bills during the 1964 season. Dobbins also played in the 1964 AFL Championship Game, a 20–7 victory over the San Diego Chargers. He was released in 1965. He later signed with the Bills again in 1966 but was also released.

Dobbins was a member of the Atlantic Coast Football League's Wilmington Clippers from 1966 to 1967, Harrisburg Capitol-Colts in 1968, and Pottstown Firebirds from 1968 to 1969.
