= Dudley Meredith =

American football player (1935–1987)

No. 74, 75
- Position: Defensive tackle

Personal information
- Born: January 16, 1935; Smithwick, Texas, U.S.
- Died: December 22, 1987 (aged 52); Jacksonville Beach, Florida, U.S.
- Listed height: 6 ft 4 in (1.93 m)
- Listed weight: 280 lb (127 kg)

Career information
- High school: Burnet (Burnet, Texas)
- College: Florida; Midwestern State; Lamar
- NFL draft: 1957: 21st round, 251st overall pick

Career history
- Houston Oilers (1963); Buffalo Bills (1964-1968); Houston Oilers (1968)

Awards and highlights
- 2× AFL champion (1964, 1965); AFL All-Star (1965)

Career AFL statistics
- Interceptions: 1
- Fumble recoveries: 1
- Sacks: 1.5
- Stats at Pro Football Reference

Cecil Dudley Meredith (January 16, 1935 – December 22, 1987) was a professional American football defensive end in the American Football League. He played six seasons for the Houston Oilers and the Buffalo Bills. He was drafted 251st overall in the 21st round of the 1957 NFL draft by the Detroit Lions.
