= 1966 American Football League Championship Game =

American football championship

Coordinates: 42.905°N 78.856°W

1966 AFL Championship Game
Kansas City Chiefs (Western) (11–2–1)	Buffalo Bills (Eastern) (9–4–1)
31	7
Head coach: Hank Stram	Head coach: Joe Collier
	1	2	3	4	Total
KC	7	10	0	14	31
BUF	7	0	0	0	7
- Date: January 1, 1967
- Stadium: War Memorial Stadium; Buffalo, New York
- Favorite: Kansas City
- Attendance: 42,080

TV in the United States
- Network: NBC
- Announcers: Curt Gowdy, Paul Christman, and Pat Hernon

Location in the United States
Location in New York

The 1966 AFL Championship Game was the seventh American Football League's championship game, played at War Memorial Stadium in Buffalo, New York, on January 1, 1967.

It matched the Western Division champion Kansas City Chiefs (11–2–1) and the Eastern Division champion Buffalo Bills (9–4–1) to decide the American Football League (AFL) champion for the 1966 season.

The host Bills entered as two-time defending champions, but the visiting Chiefs were three-point favorites, mainly because of their explosive and innovative offense led by head coach Hank Stram. The Bills were a more conventional team with a solid defensive line and a running mindset on offense. The two teams had split their season series, played early in the schedule without weather as a factor, with the road team winning each.

The Chiefs defeated the Bills by a score of 31–7, and advanced to Super Bowl I to play against the National Football League (NFL) champion Green Bay Packers.

== Background ==
The game was originally scheduled for Monday, December 26, the week after the conclusion of the regular season. The AFL–NFL merger agreement of June 1966 called for a "world championship game" between the league champions. When a date of January 15, 1967, was established, the AFL title game was moved to January 1, same as the NFL championship game in Dallas. The AFL game was at 1 p.m. EST, televised by NBC, and the NFL game followed at 4 p.m. on CBS.

Like the NFL, the host team for the title game was alternated between the divisions, regardless of record. In the AFL, the Eastern division hosted in even-numbered years and the Western in odd; home-field advantage was not adopted until 1975.

=== Kansas City Chiefs ===
The Kansas City Chiefs finished the 1966 regular season with an 11–2–1 record and clinched the Western Division title five weeks earlier, on November 27. Quarterback Len Dawson finished the season with 2,527 passing yards and 26 touchdowns, with only 10 interceptions, giving him a 101.7 passer rating. The team's top wide receiver was Otis Taylor who caught 58 passes for 1,297 yards and 8 touchdowns; Chris Burford also contributed by catching 58 passes for 758 yards and 8 touchdowns. Mike Garrett was the team's leading rusher, gaining 801 yards and 6 touchdowns. Other reliable options included Curtis McClinton (540 yards, 4 touchdowns) and Bert Coan (521 yards, 7 touchdowns). The Chiefs' offense consisted of five All-Stars: Len Dawson, Curtis McClinton, Otis Taylor, Jim Tyrer, and Ed Budde.

Their defense featured six All-Stars: Johnny Robinson, E.J. Holub, Sherrill Headrick, Bobby Bell, Buck Buchanan, and Jerry Mays.

== Game summary ==
In a chilly drizzle, Kansas City broke open a tied fierce 7–7 battle and dominated the rest of the contest from there on, forcing four turnovers (without losing any themselves) and outscoring host Buffalo 24-0 over the last three quarters.

On the opening kickoff, Fletcher Smith's short kick was fielded by defensive end Dudley Meredith, who promptly fumbled the ball, and KC punter Jerrel Wilson, who also played on the kick coverage team, recovered it for the Chiefs on the Bills 31-yard line. This led to the first score of the game, a 29-yard touchdown pass from Len Dawson to tight end Fred Arbanas. After an exchange of punts, Buffalo tied the game when receiver Elbert Dubenion raced ahead of defensive back Fred Williamson, "the Hammer", caught a pass from Jack Kemp at the Chiefs 45, and raced all the way to the end zone for a 69-yard touchdown reception.

Later on, Mike Garrett's 27-yard punt return gave the Chiefs a first down on the Bills 45-yard line. After a few plays, Dawson made a key 15-yard completion to Arbanas advancing to the Buffalo 29. It was the last catch of the day for Arbanas, who ended up leaving the game with a separated shoulder; however, it paid off big time as Dawson threw a 29-yard touchdown pass to Otis Taylor on the next play, giving the Chiefs a 14–7 second quarter lead. Buffalo responded with a drive deep into Chiefs territory, featuring Kemp's 30-yard completion to rookie receiver Rob Burnett to the Kansas City 12-yard line. But in what turned out to be one of the most crucial plays of the game, Kemp's next pass resulted in a costly interception in the end zone by safety Johnny Robinson, who returned the football 72 yards to the Bills 28. Mike Mercer eventually cashed in the turnover with a 32-yard field goal that gave the Chiefs a 17–7 halftime lead.

The third quarter was a defensive struggle with each team punting the football twice. Near the end, Kansas City got possession of the football on the Bills 42-yard line, but failed to score when Mercer missed a 49-yard field goal attempt.

The Chiefs put the game away with consecutive touchdown drives in the fourth quarter. First, Dawson's 45-yard completion to Chris Burford gave the team a first down at the Buffalo 4-yard line. Garrett then ran the ball on the next four plays, concluding with a 1-yard touchdown run. On the first play of Buffalo's next drive, receiver Glenn Bass lost a fumble that Bobby Hunt returned 21 yards to the Bills 20-yard line, which led to another Garrett touchdown run, the final score of the game from 18 yards. Footage of the play shows that Garrett was about to throw a halfback option pass but a heavy rush from Buffalo's defense prevented it, forcing Garrett to run. Buffalo could do nothing with their next drive, and on their final one of the day, Kemp was intercepted by Emmitt Thomas.

Dawson completed 16 of 24 passes for 227 yards and two touchdowns and ran for 28 yards. Garrett rushed for 39 yards and two touchdowns, caught 4 passes for 16 yards, returned a kickoff for 3 yards, and added another 37 yards on 3 punt returns. Kemp completed 12 of 25 passes for 253 yards and a touchdown, coupled with two costly interceptions. Burnett caught six passes for 127 yards.

== Box score ==
Kansas City Chiefs 31, Buffalo Bills 7

Quarter	1	2	3	4	Total
Chiefs	7	10	0	14	31
Bills	7	0	0	0	7

at War Memorial Stadium, Buffalo, New York

- Date: January 1, 1967
- Game time: 1:00 p.m. EST
- Game weather: 32 °F (0 °C), drizzle, relative humidity 82%, wind 12 mph (19 km/h), wind chill 22 °F (−6 °C)
- Game attendance: 42,080
- TV announcers (NBC): Curt Gowdy, Paul Christman, and Pat Hernon
- Pro-Football-Reference.com

Game information

Scoring

- First quarter
  - KC – Fred Arbanas 29-yard pass from Len Dawson (Mike Mercer kick). Chiefs 7–0
  - BUF – Elbert Dubenion 69-yard pass from Jack Kemp (Booth Lusteg kick). Tied 7–7
- Second quarter
  - KC – Otis Taylor 29-yard pass from Len Dawson (Mike Mercer kick). Chiefs 14–7
  - KC – Mike Mercer 22-yard field goal. Chiefs 17–7
- Third quarter
- Fourth quarter
  - KC – Mike Garrett 1-yard rush (Mike Mercer kick). Chiefs 24–7
  - KC – Mike Garrett 18-yard rush (Mike Mercer kick). Chiefs 31–7

Top passers

- KC – Len Dawson – 16/24, 227 yards, 2 TD
- BUF – Jack Kemp – 12/27, 253 yards, 1 TD, 2 INT

Top rushers

- KC – Mike Garrett – 13 rushes, 39 yards, 2 TD
- BUF – Wray Carlton – 9 rushes, 31 yards

Top receivers

- KC – Otis Taylor – 5 receptions, 78 yards, 1 TD
- BUF – Bobby Burnett – 6 receptions, 127 yards

== Starting lineups ==
Hall of Fame inductee

Kansas City	Position	Buffalo
Offense
Len Dawson	QB	Jack Kemp
Mike Garrett	RB	Bobby Burnett
Curtis McClinton	FB	Wray Carlton
Otis Taylor	FL	Elbert Dubenion
Chris Burford	SE	Bobby Crockett
Fred Arbanas	TE	Paul Costa
Jim Tyrer	LT	Stew Barber
Ed Budde	LG	Billy Shaw
Wayne Frazier	C	Al Bemiller
Curt Merz	RG	Joe O'Donnell
Dave Hill	RT	Dick Hudson
Defense
Jerry Mays	LDE	Ron McDole
Andy Rice	LDT	Jim Dunaway
Buck Buchanan	RDT	Tom Sestak
Chuck Hurston	RDE	Tom Day
Bobby Bell	LLB	John Tracey
Sherrill Headrick	MLB	Harry Jacobs
E.J. Holub	RLB	Mike Stratton
Fred Williamson	LCB	Tom Janik
Willie Mitchell	RCB	Butch Byrd
Bobby Hunt	SS	Hagood Clarke
Johnny Robinson	FS	George Saimes

== Statistics ==
Statistics	Chiefs	Bills
First downs	14	9
Rushing yards	113	40
Yards per carry	3.4	3.0
Passing yards	227	253
Sacked-Yards	9–63	4–38
Total yards	340	293
Fumbles-Lost	1–0	3–2
Turnovers	0	4
Penalties-Yards	4–40	3–23

== Officials ==
- Referee: Walt Fitzgerald
- Umpire: Walt Parker
- Head linesman: Tony Veteri
- Side linesman: Cal Lepore
- Back judge: Hugh Gamber
- Field judge: Bob Bauer

The AFL added a sixth game official, the side linesman, in 1966; the NFL added its sixth official, the line judge, during the previous season. The seventh official, the side judge, was added in 1978.

== Players' shares ==
The winning Chiefs split their players' shares for the title game 51 ways for $5,308 each, while the Bills split theirs into 47 shares for about $3,800 each.

The upcoming Super Bowl I awarded an additional $15,000 per player for the winners and $7,500 each for the losing team.

== See also ==
- 1966 AFL season
- AFL Championship Games
- Super Bowl I
- 1966 NFL Championship Game
- Bills–Chiefs rivalry

Preceded by Buffalo Bills; 1965 AFL Champions	Kansas City Chiefs; American Football League Champions; 1966	Succeeded by Oakland Raiders; 1967 AFL Champions
