= 1965 American Football League Championship Game =

Coordinates: 32.72°N 117.15°W

1965 AFL Championship Game
Buffalo Bills (Eastern) (10–3–1)	San Diego Chargers (Western) (9–2–3)
23	0
Head coach: Lou Saban	Head coach: Sid Gillman
	1	2	3	4	Total
BUF	0	14	6	3	23
SD	0	0	0	0	0
- Date: December 26, 1965
- Stadium: Balboa Stadium; San Diego, California
- MVP: Jack Kemp (QB, Buffalo)
- Attendance: 30,361

TV in the United States
- Network: NBC
- Announcers: Curt Gowdy, Paul Christman, and Charlie Jones

Radio in the United States
- Network: NBC Radio
- Announcers: Herb Carneal and George Ratterman

Location in the United States

The 1965 AFL Championship Game was the American Football League's sixth championship game, played on December 26 at Balboa Stadium in San Diego, California.

It matched the Western Division champion San Diego Chargers (9–2–3) and the Eastern Division champion Buffalo Bills (10–3–1) to decide the American Football League (AFL) champion for the 1965 season.

== Background ==
The defending champion Bills entered the game as 6½ point underdogs; the Chargers had won the first regular season meeting on October 10 by a convincing 34–3 score, and tied the Thanksgiving rematch at twenty points each.

== Game summary ==
In favorable 60 °F (16 °C) conditions on the day after Christmas, the Bills shut out the Chargers and repeated as champions, scoring two touchdowns in the second quarter, one on a punt return. They added three field goals in the second half to win 23–0. Of the ten AFL title games, this was the only shutout: the Chargers had advanced to five of the first six, but won only one, in 1963.

Bills' quarterback Jack Kemp, the league's most valuable player, was named MVP of the game; he and Paul Maguire were among the five ex-Chargers on the Bills' roster that were previously released by San Diego head coach Sid Gillman.

This was the last AFL Championship to end the season; the AFL–NFL merger agreement was made the following June, and the first Super Bowl followed the 1966 season.

== Box score ==
Buffalo Bills 23, San Diego Chargers 0

Quarter	1	2	3	4	Total
Bills	0	14	6	3	23
Chargers	0	0	0	0	0

at Balboa Stadium, San Diego, California

- Date: December 26, 1965
- Game time: 1:00 p.m. PST
- Game weather: 60 °F (16 °C)
- Game attendance: 30,361
- Referee: Jim Barnhill
- TV announcers (NBC): Curt Gowdy, Paul Christman, and Charlie Jones
- Pro-Football-Reference.com

Game information

Scoring

- First quarter
- Second quarter
  - BUF – Ernie Warlick 18-yard pass from Jack Kemp (Pete Gogolak kick). Bills 7–0
  - BUF – Butch Byrd 74-yard punt return (Pete Gogolak kick). Bills 14–0
- Third quarter
  - BUF – Pete Gogolak 11-yard field goal. Bills 17–0
  - BUF – Pete Gogolak 39-yard field goal. Bills 20–0
- Fourth quarter
  - BUF – Pete Gogolak 32-yard field goal. Bills 23–0

Top passers

- BUF – Jack Kemp – 8/19, 155 yards, 1 TD, 1 INT
- SD – John Hadl – 11/23, 140 yards, 2 INT

Top rushers

- BUF – Wray Carlton – 16 rushes, 63 yards
- SD – Paul Lowe – 12 rushes, 57 yards

Top receivers

- BUF – Bo Roberson – 3 receptions, 88 yards
- SD – Lance Alworth – 4 receptions, 82 yards

== Officials ==
- Referee: Jim Barnhill
- Umpire: Walt Parker
- Head linesman: Henry Kessel
- Back judge: Jack Reader
- Field judge: Ben Dreith
- Alternate: Elvin Hutchison

The AFL still had five game officials in 1965; the NFL added a sixth official this season, the line judge. The AFL went to six officials in 1966, and the seventh official, the side judge, was added in 1978.

Referee Jim Barnhill died less than three months after this game; while officiating a basketball playoff game in Wisconsin, he collapsed and died at age 45.

== Statistics ==
Statistics	Bills	Chargers
First downs	23	12
Rushing yards	108	104
Yards per carry	3.0	3.8
Passing yards	167	164
Sacked-Yards	2–15	5–45
Total yards	260	223
Fumbles-Lost	1–0	1–0
Turnovers	1	2
Penalties-Yards	2–21	3–41

== Players' shares ==
The winning Bills players were allocated $5,189 each, while the Chargers players received $3,447 each. This was twice as much as the previous year and about 70% of the players' shares for the NFL championship game.

Because of the smaller venue, the attendance was nearly 10,000 lower than 1964, but the television money was increased with NBC.

== Aftermath ==
This game marked the first time the AFL Championship Game was televised in color, and the last time that a final pro football championship was decided in December, within the same calendar year as regular season games (the 1965 NFL Championship Game was played on January 2, 1966). The following season would conclude with the first Super Bowl played in January 1967.

This is the last professional American football championship game to have been won by a team from Buffalo, New York, as well as the last of any major league team from the city. Indeed, the fortunes of both teams would subsequently wane. The Bills would not appear in another championship game until Super Bowl XXV when the infamous Wide Right occurred, and would also proceed to lose the next three Super Bowls. The Chargers meanwhile would not appear in another championship until Super Bowl XXIX, which they lost to the San Francisco 49ers, 49–26. San Diego and Buffalo currently have the longest and second-longest championship droughts respectively for any city that has at least two major sports franchises.

== See also ==
- 1965 AFL season
- AFL Championship Games
- 1965 NFL Championship Game

Preceded by Buffalo Bills; 1964 AFL Champions	Buffalo Bills; American Football League Champions; 1965	Succeeded by Kansas City Chiefs; 1966 AFL Champions
