= 1964 American Football League Championship Game =

Coordinates: 42.905°N 78.856°W

1964 AFL Championship Game
San Diego Chargers (Western) (8–5–1)	Buffalo Bills (Eastern) (12–2)
7	20
Head coach: Sid Gillman	Head coach: Lou Saban
	1	2	3	4	Total
SD	7	0	0	0	7
BUF	3	10	0	7	20
- Date: December 26, 1964
- Stadium: War Memorial Stadium; Buffalo, New York
- Referee: Bob Finley
- Attendance: 40,242

TV in the United States
- Network: ABC
- Announcers: Curt Gowdy, Paul Christman

Location in the United States

The 1964 AFL Championship Game was the American Football League's fifth championship game, played at War Memorial Stadium in Buffalo, New York, on Saturday, December 26.

The Buffalo Bills (12–2) of the Eastern Division hosted the defending AFL champion San Diego Chargers (8–5–1) of the Western Division. The two had met twice in the regular season and the Bills won both, most recently by three points in San Diego a month earlier on Thanksgiving Day. This was the first time the city of Buffalo had competed for a football championship since the AAFC Championship Game sixteen years ago in 1948. Hall of fame wide receiver Lance Alworth of the Chargers was injured in the final regular season game (left knee hyperextension) and did not play. The Chargers had lost three of their last four games to end the regular season, and the Bills were slight favorites to win the title at home; with Alworth out they became strong favorites.

== Game summary ==
San Diego opened the game with an 80-yard drive in four plays, but it was their only score as the Bills won 20–7 for their first league championship. Combined with the next season, the Bills' consecutive AFL titles are the only two championships ever won by a major league team based in Buffalo.

One of the game's most iconic plays was one known as the "hit heard 'round the world," when Bills linebacker Mike Stratton laid a particularly hard hit on Chargers running back Keith Lincoln that broke a rib and forced him out of the game midway through the first quarter. Lincoln had over 330 yards of offense in the previous year's title game and had already rushed for 47 yards, caught a pass for 11 yards, and kicked an extra point (as the reserve placekicker) in the first 6½ minutes. Without Lincoln and Alworth, the San Diego offensive attack was severely hindered.

Bills' fullback Cookie Gilchrist rushed for 122 yards on sixteen carries, while quarterback Jack Kemp completed ten of twenty passes for 188 yards and scored a fourth quarter touchdown on a sneak. Rookie kicker Pete Gogolak added two field goals in the first half. War Memorial Stadium was filled with a sellout attendance of 40,242.

== Box score ==
Buffalo Bills 20, San Diego Chargers 7

Quarter	1	2	3	4	Total
Chargers	7	0	0	0	7
Bills	3	10	0	7	20

at War Memorial Stadium, Buffalo, New York

- Date: December 26, 1964
- Game time: 2:00 p.m. EST
- Game attendance: 40,242
- Referee: Bob Finley
- TV announcers (ABC): Curt Gowdy, Paul Christman
- Pro-Football-Reference.com

Game information

Scoring

- First quarter
  - SD – Dave Kocourek 26-yard pass from Tobin Rote (Keith Lincoln kick). Chargers 7–0
  - BUF – Pete Gogolak 12-yard field goal. Chargers 7–3
- Second quarter
  - BUF – Wray Carlton 4-yard rush (Gogolak kick). Bills 10–7
  - BUF – Pete Gogolak 17-yard field goal. Bills 13–7
- Third quarter
- Fourth quarter
  - BUF – Jack Kemp 1-yard rush (Gogolak kick). Bills 20–7

Top passers

- SD – Tobin Rote – 10/26, 118 yards, 1 TD, 2 INT
- BUF – Jack Kemp – 10/20, 188 yards

Top rushers

- SD – Keith Lincoln – 3 rushes, 47 yards
- BUF – Cookie Gilchrist – 16 rushes, 122 yards

Top receivers

- SD – Keith Kinderman – 4 receptions, 52 yards
- BUF – Glenn Bass – 2 receptions, 70 yards

== Statistics ==
Statistics	Chargers	Bills
First downs	15	21
Rushing yards	124	219
Yards per carry	6.8	5.3
Passing yards	149	188
Sacked-Yards	2–14	2–20
Total yards	259	387
Fumbles-Lost	1–0	0–0
Turnovers	3	0
Penalties-Yards	3–20	3–45

== Aftermath ==
It was the final game for Chargers quarterback Tobin Rote, who had led the Detroit Lions to the NFL title seven years earlier in 1957 and the Chargers to the AFL crown in 1963. He was replaced in the game by John Hadl, who had played most of the regular season.

The 1964 AFL championship game was the penultimate pro football championship game played in Buffalo (the Bills hosted again in 1966, but lost in their attempt for a third consecutive AFL crown). Held six days after the completion of the 1964 regular season, it was the only AFL title game not played on Sunday, as well as the final one televised in black-and-white. The NFL's championship game was played the following day on Sunday, December 27.

This was the last AFL game on ABC television; rights were sold in January 1964 to NBC for $36 million over five years, beginning with the 1965 season. This infusion of cash helped spur a bidding war for talent with the NFL, which led to the AFL–NFL merger agreement in June 1966. With the exception of the 1966 Continental Football League championship, ABC did not carry pro football again until after the completion of the merger and the subsequent creation of Monday Night Football for the 1970 season.

== Players' shares ==
The winning Bills split their players' shares for the title game 43 ways for $2,668 each, while the Chargers split theirs into 44 shares for $1,738 each. These shares were about one-third of those for the NFL title game in 1964, at $8,000 and $5,000 each. With the new television deal with NBC, the players' shares for the AFL title game nearly doubled in 1965.

== See also ==
- 1964 AFL season
- AFL Championship Games
- 1964 NFL Championship Game
