= 1964 All-AFL Team =

American football team

The 1964 American Football League All-League Team was selected after the 1964 American Football League season by AFL players, the Associated Press (AP), the Newspaper Enterprise Association (NEA), the New York Daily News (NYDN), and United Press International (UPI) to honor the league's top performers at each position.

== Teams ==
Offense
Position	First team	Second team
Quarterback	Babe Parilli, Patriots (AFL, AP, NEA, NYDN, UPI)	Len Dawson, Chiefs (AP, NEA, NYDN, UPI)
Halfback	N/A	Abner Haynes, Chiefs (AP, NEA, NYDN); Sid Blanks, Oilers (UPI)
Fullback	Cookie Gilchrist, Bills (AFL, AP, NEA, NYDN, UPI); Keith Lincoln, Chargers (AFL, AP, NEA, NYDN, UPI)	Matt Snell, Jets (AP, NEA, NYDN, UPI)
Wide receiver	Lance Alworth, Chargers (AFL, AP, NEA, NYDN, UPI); Charlie Hennigan, Oilers (AFL, AP, NEA, NYDN, UPI); Art Powell, Raiders (AFL)	Art Powell, Raiders (AP, NEA, NYDN, UPI); Elbert Dubenion, Bills (AP, NYDN); Gino Cappelletti, Boston (NEA, UPI)
Tight end	Fred Arbanas, Chiefs (AFL, AP, NEA, NYDN, UPI)	Dave Kocourek, Chargers (AP, NEA, NYDN, UPI)
Tackle	Ron Mix, Chargers (AFL, AP, NEA, NYDN, UPI); Stew Barber, Bills (AP, NEA, NYDN, UPI); Jim Tyrer, Chiefs (AFL)	Jim Tyrer, Chiefs (AP, NEA, NYDN, UPI); Eldon Danenhauer, Broncos (AP, NYDN); Sherman Plunkett, Jets (NEA); Sonny Bishop, Oilers (UPI)
Guard	Billy Shaw, Bills (AFL, AP, NEA, NYDN, UPI); Billy Neighbors, Patriots (AP, NYDN, UPI); Bob Talamini, Oilers (AFL, NEA)	Bob Talamini, Oilers (AP, NYDN, UPI); Charlie Long, Patriots (NEA, NYDN, UPI); Wayne Hawkins, Raiders (AP); Bob Mischak, Raiders (NEA)
Center	Jim Otto, Raiders (AFL, AP, NEA, NYDN, UPI)	Jon Morris, Patriots (AP, NEA, NYDN); Mike Hudock, Jets (UPI)

Defense
Position	First team	Second team
Defensive end	Earl Faison, Chargers (AFL, AP, NEA, NYDN, UPI); Larry Eisenhauer, Patriots (AFL, AP, NEA, NYDN); Bobby Bell, Chiefs (UPI)	Bobby Bell, Chiefs (AP, NEA, NYDN); Bob Dee, Patriots (AP, NYDN); Tom Day, Bills (NEA); Don Floyd, Oilers (UPI); Larry Eisenhauer, Patriots (UPI)
Defensive tackle	Tom Sestak, Bills (AFL, AP, NEA, NYDN, UPI); Ernie Ladd, Chargers (AP, NEA, NYDN, UPI); Jerry Mays, Chiefs (AFL)	Buck Buchanan, Chiefs (AP, NEA, NYDN, UPI); Jerry Mays, Chiefs (AP, NEA); Houston Antwine, Patriots (NYDN, UPI)
Middle linebacker	Nick Buoniconti, Boston (AFL, AP, NEA, NYDN, UPI)	Sherrill Headrick, Chiefs (AP, NEA); Archie Matsos, Raiders (NYDN); Chuck Allen, Chargers (UPI)
Outside linebacker	Larry Grantham, Jets (AFL, AP, NEA, NYDN, UPI); Mike Stratton, Bills (AP, NYDN, UPI); Tom Addison, Patriots (AFL, NEA)	Frank Buncom, Chargers (AP, NEA, NYDN, UPI); Tom Addison, Patriots (AP, NYDN, UPI); John Tracey, Bills (NEA); Mike Stratton, Bills (NEA)
Cornerback	Willie Brown, Broncos (AFL, AP, NEA, NYDN, UPI); Dave Grayson, Chiefs (AFL, AP, NYDN); Dick Westmoreland, Chargers (NEA); Fred Williamson, Raiders (UPI)	Dick Westmoreland, Chargers (AP, NYDN, UPI); Dave Grayson, Chiefs (NEA, UPI); Pete Jaquess, Oilers (AP); Butch Byrd, Bills (NEA); Fred Williamson, Raiders (NYDN)
Safety	Ron Hall, Patriots (AP, NEA, NYDN, UPI); Dainard Paulson, Jets (AFL, NEA, UPI); George Saimes, Bills (AP, NYDN); Fred Glick, Oilers (AFL)	Bobby Hunt, Chiefs (AP, NYDN); Dainard Paulson, Jets (AP, NYDN); George Saimes, Bills (NEA, UPI); Fred Glick, Oilers (NEA); Goose Gonsoulin, Broncos (UPI)
