= List of AFL and AFC champions =

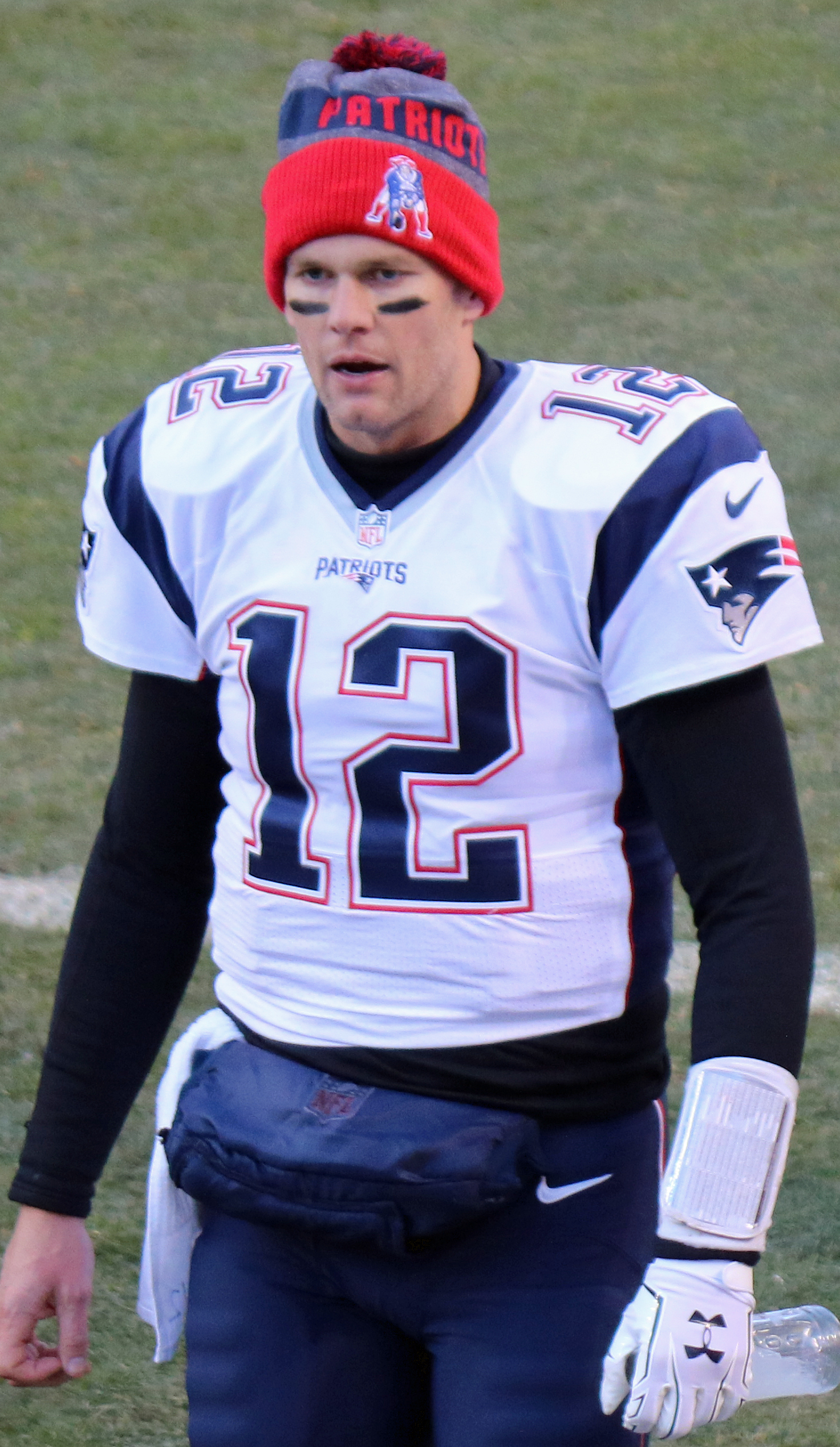
Tom Brady won 9 AFC Championship titles with the Patriots, the most by any player.

The American Football Conference (AFC) is one of two conferences within the National Football League, the National Football Conference (NFC) being the other. The AFC has its roots in the American Football League (AFL), which began to play in 1960. In 1970, the AFL merged with the NFL. As part of the merger, the former AFL teams, plus three former NFL teams (Baltimore Colts, Cleveland Browns, and Pittsburgh Steelers), were placed in the AFC. The remaining former NFL teams were placed in the NFC. As of the 2025 season only the Cleveland Browns, Jacksonville Jaguars and Houston Texans have not won an AFC or AFL championship.

== Background ==
The AFC champion is not necessarily the team with the best record in the regular season. Rather, the champion is decided by the AFC Championship Game (formerly the AFL Championship Game) as part of the post-season playoffs involving the teams with the best regular season records. The Houston Oilers won the first two AFL championships, in 1960 and 1961. The only other team to win two consecutive AFL championships prior to the merger was the Buffalo Bills, who won in 1964 and 1965 with future United States Congressman, HUD Secretary and Vice-Presidential nominee Jack Kemp at quarterback. After the merger, the first team to win three consecutive AFC championships was the Miami Dolphins in 1971 through 1973. The only team to win four consecutive AFC championships was the Buffalo Bills in 1990 through 1993. The New England Patriots and the Kansas City Chiefs are the only other AFC teams to win three consecutive championships, from 2016 through 2018, and 2022 through 2024 respectively.

Through the 2025 season, the most AFL or AFC championships won by any team is twelve, by the Patriots, followed by the Pittsburgh Steelers, Denver Broncos, and Dallas Texans/Kansas City Chiefs, who have each won eight AFL or AFC championships. The Oakland/Los Angeles/Las Vegas Raiders have been the AFL or AFC runner up, as a result of losing the AFL or AFC Championship Game, a record nine times. The Steelers have been the runner up eight times, while the Los Angeles/San Diego Chargers have been the runner up seven times.

The record for the most regular-season wins by an AFL or AFC champion is 16, by the 2007 New England Patriots, with a perfect 16–0 record, followed by the 2024 Kansas City Chiefs, who won 15 games in a 17-game season. The 1972 Miami Dolphins also had a perfect season, winning 14 games in a 14-game season, with a 14–0 record.

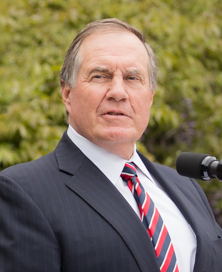
Bill Belichick has won nine AFC Championships as a head coach.

Bill Belichick has been the head coach for nine AFC championship teams. Don Shula and Andy Reid have each been the head coach of five AFC championship teams. Chuck Noll and Marv Levy each coached four AFC champions.

Tom Brady has been the starting quarterback for nine AFC championship teams, more than any other quarterback. In addition, he was the starting quarterback for one NFC championship team, the 2020 Tampa Bay Buccaneers, for a total of 10 conference championships. John Elway and Patrick Mahomes were the starting quarterback for five AFC champions. Terry Bradshaw, Jim Kelly and Peyton Manning were each the starting quarterback for four AFC champions. Manning started in five championships for two different franchises, the Indianapolis Colts and the Broncos.

Franco Harris and Thurman Thomas were each the leader in rushing yards for an AFC champion four times. Larry Csonka was the leader in rushing yards for an AFC champion three times. Travis Kelce was the leader in receiving yards for an AFC champion five times. Andre Reed was the leader in receiving yards for an AFC champion four times and Paul Warfield and Julian Edelman have been the leader in receiving yards for an AFC champion three times.

The 1973 Miami Dolphins had seven first-team All-Pros, more than any other AFC champion since the AFL–NFL merger. The 1971 Miami Dolphins, 1979 Pittsburgh Steelers and 2007 New England Patriots each had five 1st team All-Pros. The 1970 Baltimore Colts, 1982 Miami Dolphins, 1987 Denver Broncos and 1996 and 2001 New England Patriots did not have any 1st team All-Pros. Jack Ham is the only defensive player to be named as a 1st team All-Pro for four AFC champions. Troy Polamalu and Chris Jones were defensive 1st team All-Pros for three AFC champions. Larry Little is the only offensive lineman to be named as a 1st team All-Pro for three AFC champions. Rob Gronkowski is the only tight end to be named a 1st team All-Pro for three AFC champions. Garo Yepremian is the only kicker to be named as a 1st team All-Pro for two AFC champions.

At the end of the 1966 season, the Super Bowl began to be played between the AFL champion and the NFL champion. After the AFL–NFL merger in 1970, the Super Bowl continued to be played between the AFC champion and the NFC champion. The AFL champion lost the first two Super Bowls. The 1968 AFL champion New York Jets with Joe Namath at quarterback became the first AFL team to win the Super Bowl. Starting with that Super Bowl, the AFL or AFC champion won 11 out of 13 Super Bowls. However, the AFC champion lost 13 consecutive Super Bowls, from the 1984 AFC champion Miami Dolphins through the 1996 AFC champion New England Patriots. Overall, the AFL or AFC champion has won 29 of the 58 Super Bowls played through the end of the 2023 season.

== Key ==
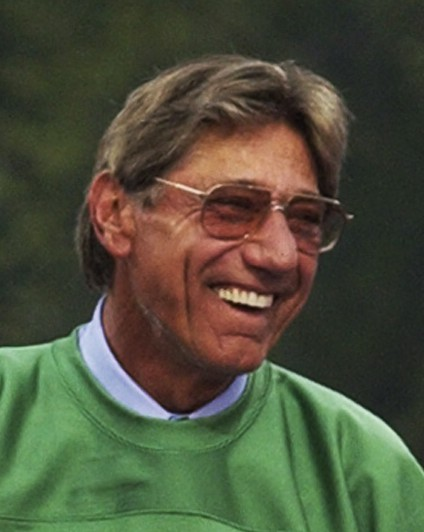
Joe Namath was the quarterback for the 1968 AFL champion New York Jets, the first AFL team to win the Super Bowl.

Season	Each year is linked to an article about that particular AFL or NFL season.
Team	Name of AFL or AFC Championship team, linked to the team's championship season
Record	Championship team's regular season record wins–losses; if the team played any tie games the record is shown as wins–losses–ties
Head coach	Championship team's head coach; if the team had multiple head coaches for the season they are shown in decreasing order of number of regular season wins
Quarterback	Name of quarterback with most passing attempts for the AFL/AFC champion during the regular season
Leading Rusher	Name of player with most rushing yards for the AFL/AFC champion during the regular season
Leading Receiver	Name of player with most receiving yards for the AFL/AFC champion during the regular season
All-Pros	List of 1st team AP All-Pros on that season's AFL/AFC champion
Runner Up	Name of team that lost the AFL or AFC Championship Game
†	Super Bowl Champion
*	Member of Pro Football Hall of Fame

== AFL and AFC championship teams ==
=== AFL champions ===
Season	Team	Record	Head coach	Quarterback	Leading rusher	Leading receiver	All-Pros	Runner-up	Reference
1960	Houston Oilers	10–4	Lou Rymkus	George Blanda*	Billy Cannon	Bill Groman	Jamison, Johnston, Smith	Los Angeles Chargers	
1961	Houston Oilers	10–3–1	Wally Lemm, Lou Rymkus^{[a]}	George Blanda*	Billy Cannon	Charley Hennigan	Banfield, Blanda*, Cannon, Groman, Hennigan, Jamison	San Diego Chargers	
1962	Dallas Texans	11–3	Hank Stram*	Len Dawson*	Abner Haynes	Chris Burford	Burford, Dawson*, Hayes, Headrick, Holub, Hunt	Houston Oilers	
1963	San Diego Chargers	12–2	Sid Gillman*	Tobin Rote	Paul Lowe	Lance Alworth*	Alworth*, Faison, Lincoln, Mix*, Rote	Boston Patriots	
1964	Buffalo Bills	12–2	Lou Saban	Jack Kemp	Cookie Gilchrist	Elbert Dubenion	Barber, Gilchrist, Saimes, Sestak, Shaw*, Stratton	San Diego Chargers	
1965	Buffalo Bills	10–3–1	Lou Saban	Jack Kemp	Wray Carlton	Bo Roberson	Byrd, Kemp, Saimes, Sestak, Shaw*, Stratton	San Diego Chargers	
1966	Kansas City Chiefs	11–2–1	Hank Stram*	Len Dawson*	Mike Garrett	Otis Taylor	Arbanas, Bell*, Buchanan*, Budde, Dawson*, Mays, Robinson*, Taylor, Tyrer	Buffalo Bills	
1967	Oakland Raiders	13–1	John Rauch	Daryle Lamonica	Hewritt Dixon	Fred Biletnikoff*	Davidson, Keating, Lamonica, McCloughan, Otto*	Houston Oilers	
1968	New York Jets†	11–3	Weeb Ewbank*	Joe Namath*	Matt Snell	Don Maynard*	Namath*, Philbin, Sauer	Oakland Raiders	
1969	Kansas City Chiefs†	11–3	Hank Stram*	Len Dawson*	Mike Garrett	Otis Taylor	Bell*, Buchanan*, Budde, Robinson*, Tyrer	Oakland Raiders	

=== AFC champions ===
Season	Team	Record	Head coach	Quarterback	Leading rusher	Leading receiver	All-Pros	Runner-up	Reference
1970	Baltimore Colts†	11–2–1	Don McCafferty	Johnny Unitas*	Norm Bulaich	Roy Jefferson	—N/a	Oakland Raiders	
1971	Miami Dolphins	10–3–1	Don Shula*	Bob Griese*	Larry Csonka*	Paul Warfield*	Csonka*, Griese*, Little*, Warfield*, Yepremian	Baltimore Colts	
1972	Miami Dolphins†	14–0	Don Shula*	Earl Morrall^{[b]}	Larry Csonka*^{[c]}	Paul Warfield*	Anderson, Little*, Morrall, Stanfill	Pittsburgh Steelers	
1973	Miami Dolphins†	12–2	Don Shula*	Bob Griese*	Larry Csonka*	Paul Warfield*	Anderson, Csonka*, Langer*, Little*, Scott, Warfield*, Yepremian	Oakland Raiders	
1974	Pittsburgh Steelers†	10–3–1	Chuck Noll*	Terry Bradshaw*	Franco Harris*	Frank Lewis	Greene*, Greenwood, Ham*	Oakland Raiders	
1975	Pittsburgh Steelers†	12–2	Chuck Noll*	Terry Bradshaw*	Franco Harris*	Lynn Swann*	Blount*, Greenwood, Ham*	Oakland Raiders	
1976	Oakland Raiders†	13–1	John Madden*	Ken Stabler*	Mark van Eeghen	Cliff Branch	Branch, Casper*, Guy*	Pittsburgh Steelers	
1977	Denver Broncos	12–2	Red Miller	Craig Morton	Otis Armstrong	Haven Moses	Alzado, Gradishar*, Jackson, Thompson	Oakland Raiders	
1978	Pittsburgh Steelers†	14–2	Chuck Noll*	Terry Bradshaw*	Franco Harris*	Lynn Swann*	Bradshaw*, Ham*, Swann*, Webster*	Houston Oilers	
1979	Pittsburgh Steelers†	12–4	Chuck Noll*	Terry Bradshaw*	Franco Harris*	John Stallworth*	Ham*, Lambert*, Shell, Stallworth*, Webster*	Houston Oilers	
1980	Oakland Raiders†	11–5	Tom Flores*	Jim Plunkett	Mark van Eeghen	Cliff Branch	Hayes, Hendricks*	San Diego Chargers	
1981	Cincinnati Bengals	12–4	Forrest Gregg*	Ken Anderson	Pete Johnson	Cris Collinsworth	Anderson, McInally, Munoz*	San Diego Chargers	
1982	Miami Dolphins	7–2	Don Shula*	David Woodley	Andra Franklin	Jimmy Cefalo	—N/a	New York Jets	
1983	Los Angeles Raiders†	12–4	Tom Flores*	Jim Plunkett	Marcus Allen*	Todd Christensen	Christensen	Seattle Seahawks	
1984	Miami Dolphins	14–2	Don Shula*	Dan Marino*	Woody Bennett	Mark Clayton	Marino*, Newman, Roby, Stephenson*	Pittsburgh Steelers	
1985	New England Patriots	11–5	Raymond Berry*	Tony Eason	Craig James	Stanley Morgan	Hannah*, Tippett*	Miami Dolphins	
1986	Denver Broncos	11–5	Dan Reeves	John Elway*	Sammy Winder	Mark Jackson	Jones, Mecklenburg	Cleveland Browns	
1987	Denver Broncos	10–4–1	Dan Reeves	John Elway*	Sammy Winder	Vance Johnson	—N/a	Cleveland Browns	
1988	Cincinnati Bengals	12–4	Sam Wyche	Boomer Esiason	Ickey Woods	Eddie Brown	Esiason, Krumrie, Munoz*	Buffalo Bills	
1989	Denver Broncos	11–5	Dan Reeves	John Elway*	Bobby Humphrey	Vance Johnson	Mecklenburg	Cleveland Browns	
1990	Buffalo Bills	13–3	Marv Levy*	Jim Kelly*	Thurman Thomas*	Andre Reed*	Hull, Smith*, Thomas*	Los Angeles Raiders	
1991	Buffalo Bills	13–3	Marv Levy*	Jim Kelly*	Thurman Thomas*	Andre Reed*	Hull, Kelly*, Thomas*	Denver Broncos	
1992	Buffalo Bills	11–5	Marv Levy*	Jim Kelly*	Thurman Thomas*	Andre Reed*	Jones	Miami Dolphins	
1993	Buffalo Bills	12–4	Marv Levy*	Jim Kelly*	Thurman Thomas*	Andre Reed*	Smith*	Kansas City Chiefs	
1994	San Diego Chargers	11–5	Bobby Ross	Stan Humphries	Natrone Means	Tony Martin	Carney, Seau*	Pittsburgh Steelers	
1995	Pittsburgh Steelers	11–5	Bill Cowher*	Neil O'Donnell	Erric Pegram	Yancey Thigpen	Dawson*, Lloyd	Indianapolis Colts	
1996	New England Patriots	11–5	Bill Parcells*	Drew Bledsoe	Curtis Martin*	Terry Glenn	—N/a	Jacksonville Jaguars	
1997	Denver Broncos†	12–4	Mike Shanahan	John Elway*	Terrell Davis*	Rod Smith	Davis*, Mobley, Sharpe*	Pittsburgh Steelers	
1998	Denver Broncos†	14–2	Mike Shanahan	John Elway*	Terrell Davis*	Rod Smith	Davis*, Sharpe*	New York Jets	
1999	Tennessee Titans	13–3	Jeff Fisher	Steve McNair	Eddie George	Kevin Dyson	Kearse, Matthews*	Jacksonville Jaguars	
2000	Baltimore Ravens†	12–4	Brian Billick	Tony Banks^{[d]}	Jamal Lewis	Shannon Sharpe*	Lewis*, Ogden*	Oakland Raiders	
2001	New England Patriots†	11–5	Bill Belichick	Tom Brady	Antowain Smith	Troy Brown	—N/a	Pittsburgh Steelers	
2002	Oakland Raiders	11–5	Bill Callahan	Rich Gannon	Charlie Garner	Jerry Rice*	Gannon, Kennedy, Robbins, Woodson*	Tennessee Titans	
2003	New England Patriots†	14–2	Bill Belichick	Tom Brady	Antowain Smith	Deion Branch	Harrison, Law*, Seymour*	Indianapolis Colts	
2004	New England Patriots†	14–2	Bill Belichick	Tom Brady	Corey Dillon	David Givens	Seymour*, Vinatieri	Pittsburgh Steelers	
2005	Pittsburgh Steelers†	11–5	Bill Cowher*	Ben Roethlisberger	Willie Parker	Hines Ward	Faneca*, Polamalu*	Denver Broncos	
2006	Indianapolis Colts†	12–4	Tony Dungy*	Peyton Manning*	Joseph Addai	Marvin Harrison*	Harrison*	New England Patriots	
2007	New England Patriots	16–0	Bill Belichick	Tom Brady	Laurence Maroney	Randy Moss*	Brady, Light, Moss*, Samuel, Vrabel	San Diego Chargers	
2008	Pittsburgh Steelers†	12–4	Mike Tomlin	Ben Roethlisberger	Willie Parker	Hines Ward	Harrison, Polamalu*	Baltimore Ravens	
2009	Indianapolis Colts	14–2	Jim Caldwell	Peyton Manning*	Joseph Addai	Reggie Wayne	Manning, Clark, Freeney*	New York Jets	
2010	Pittsburgh Steelers	12–4	Mike Tomlin	Ben Roethlisberger	Rashard Mendenhall	Mike Wallace	Harrison, Polamalu*, Pouncey	New York Jets	
2011	New England Patriots	13–3	Bill Belichick	Tom Brady	BenJarvus Green-Ellis	Wes Welker	Gronkowski, Mankins, Welker, Wilfork	Baltimore Ravens	
2012	Baltimore Ravens†	10–6	John Harbaugh	Joe Flacco	Ray Rice	Anquan Boldin	Jones, Leach	New England Patriots	
2013	Denver Broncos	13–3	John Fox	Peyton Manning*	Knowshon Moreno	Demaryius Thomas	Manning, Thomas, Vasquez, Prater	New England Patriots	
2014	New England Patriots†	12–4	Bill Belichick	Tom Brady	LeGarrette Blount	Julian Edelman	Gronkowski, Revis	Indianapolis Colts	
2015	Denver Broncos†	12–4	Gary Kubiak	Peyton Manning*	Ronnie Hillman	Demaryius Thomas	Miller	New England Patriots	
2016	New England Patriots†	14–2	Bill Belichick	Tom Brady	LeGarrette Blount	Julian Edelman	Slater	Pittsburgh Steelers	
2017	New England Patriots	13–3	Bill Belichick	Tom Brady	Dion Lewis	Rob Gronkowski	Brady, Gronkowski	Jacksonville Jaguars	
2018	New England Patriots†	11–5	Bill Belichick	Tom Brady	Sony Michel	Julian Edelman	Gilmore	Kansas City Chiefs	
2019	Kansas City Chiefs†	12–4	Andy Reid	Patrick Mahomes	Damien Williams	Travis Kelce	Mathieu	Tennessee Titans	
2020	Kansas City Chiefs	14–2	Andy Reid	Patrick Mahomes	Clyde Edwards-Helaire	Travis Kelce	Kelce, Hill, Mathieu	Buffalo Bills	
2021	Cincinnati Bengals	10–7	Zac Taylor	Joe Burrow	Joe Mixon	Ja'Marr Chase	Chase, Mixon, Hendrickson	Kansas City Chiefs	
2022	Kansas City Chiefs†	14–3	Andy Reid	Patrick Mahomes	Isiah Pacheco	Travis Kelce	Mahomes, Kelce, Jones, Townsend	Cincinnati Bengals	
2023	Kansas City Chiefs†	11–6	Andy Reid	Patrick Mahomes	Isiah Pacheco	Travis Kelce	Thuney, Jones, McDuffie	Baltimore Ravens	
2024	Kansas City Chiefs	15–2	Andy Reid	Patrick Mahomes	Kareem Hunt	Travis Kelce	Thuney, Jones	Buffalo Bills	
2025	New England Patriots	14–3	Mike Vrabel	Drake Maye	TreVeyon Henderson	Stefon Diggs	—N/a	Denver Broncos	

== Footnotes ==
- ^{a} Lou Rymkus began the 1961 season as the Houston Oilers' head coach. After the Oilers started the season with a 1–3–1 record, Wally Lemm took over as head coach. The Oilers won all nine games with Lemm as their head coach and went on to win the 1961 AFL Championship Game.
- ^{b} Bob Griese began the 1972 season as the Miami Dolphins' starting quarterback. After Griese suffered an ankle injury in the 5th game of the season, Morrall became the starting quarterback for the remainder of the season and ended the season with more passing attempts than Griese. Morrall started the AFC Championship game, but Griese replaced him with the Dolphins behind in the second half and led the Dolphins to the victory. Griese then started Super Bowl VII.*
- ^{c} In 1972 both Larry Csonka and Mercury Morris rushed for 1,000 or more yards for the Miami Dolphins. Csonka led the team in rushing yardage, making Morris the only player on an AFC (or NFC) championship team to have at least 1000 rushing yards but not lead the team.
- ^{d} Tony Banks and Trent Dilfer each started 8 games for the 2000 Baltimore Ravens. Banks is listed here because had 274 passing attempts and Dilfer had 226. But Dilfer was the starting quarterback in the AFC Championship game and in Super Bowl XXXV.
