= List of American Football League seasons =

The following is a list of American Football League (AFL) seasons since the inception of the league in 1960 to 1969, the year before it merged with the National Football League (NFL).

Note: W = Wins, L = Losses, T = Ties, PCT= Winning Percentage, PF= Points For, PA = Points Against

== 1960 ==
Eastern Division
Team	W	L	T	PCT	PF	PA
Houston Oilers	10	4	0	.714	379	285
New York Titans	7	7	0	.500	382	399
Buffalo Bills	5	8	1	.385	296	303
Boston Patriots	5	9	0	.375	286	349

Western Division
Team	W	L	T	PCT	PF	PA
Los Angeles Chargers	10	4	0	.714	373	336
Dallas Texans	8	6	0	.571	362	253
Oakland Raiders	6	8	0	.429	319	388
Denver Broncos	4	9	1	.308	309	393

- AFL Championship Game
  Houston Oilers 24, Los Angeles Chargers 16, January 1, 1961, Jeppesen Stadium, Houston, Texas

== 1961 ==
The Chargers relocated from Los Angeles to San Diego prior to the season.

Eastern Division
Team	W	L	T	PCT	PF	PA
Houston Oilers	10	3	1	.769	513	242
Boston Patriots	9	4	1	.692	413	313
New York Titans	7	7	0	.500	301	390
Buffalo Bills	6	8	0	.429	294	342

Western Division
Team	W	L	T	PCT	PF	PA
San Diego Chargers	12	2	0	.857	396	219
Dallas Texans	6	8	0	.429	334	343
Denver Broncos	3	11	0	.214	251	432
Oakland Raiders	2	12	0	.143	237	458

- AFL Championship Game
  Houston Oilers 10, San Diego Chargers 3, December 24, 1961, Balboa Stadium, San Diego, California

== 1962 ==
Eastern Division
Team	W	L	T	PCT	PF	PA
Houston Oilers	11	3	0	.786	387	270
Boston Patriots	9	4	1	.692	346	295
Buffalo Bills	7	6	1	.538	309	272
New York Titans	5	9	0	.357	278	423

Western Division
Team	W	L	T	PCT	PF	PA
Dallas Texans	11	3	0	.786	389	233
Denver Broncos	7	7	0	.500	353	334
San Diego Chargers	4	10	0	.286	314	392
Oakland Raiders	1	13	0	.071	213	370

- AFL Championship Game
  Dallas Texans 20, Houston Oilers 17 (2OT), December 23, 1962, Jeppesen Stadium, Houston, Texas

== 1963 ==
The Dallas Texans relocated to Kansas City, Missouri and changed the team's name to the Kansas City Chiefs. Meanwhile, the New York Titans became the New York Jets. The AFL decided to postpone their games on November 24, due to the assassination of President John F. Kennedy two days earlier.

Eastern Division
Team	W	L	T	PCT	PF	PA
Boston Patriots	7	6	1	.538	327	257
Buffalo Bills	7	6	1	.538	304	291
Houston Oilers	6	8	0	.429	302	372
New York Jets	5	8	1	.385	249	399

Western Division
Team	W	L	T	PCT	PF	PA
San Diego Chargers	11	3	0	.786	399	255
Oakland Raiders	10	4	0	.714	363	282
Kansas City Chiefs	5	7	2	.417	347	263
Denver Broncos	2	11	1	.154	301	473

- Eastern Division playoff
  Boston Patriots 26, Buffalo Bills 8, December 28, 1963, War Memorial Stadium, Buffalo, New York
- AFL Championship Game
  San Diego Chargers 51, Boston Patriots 10, January 5, 1964, Balboa Stadium, San Diego, California

== 1964 ==
Eastern Division
Team	W	L	T	PCT	PF	PA
Buffalo Bills	12	2	0	.857	400	242
Boston Patriots	10	3	1	.769	365	297
New York Jets	5	8	1	.385	278	315
Houston Oilers	4	10	0	.286	310	355

Western Division
Team	W	L	T	PCT	PF	PA
San Diego Chargers	8	5	1	.615	341	300
Kansas City Chiefs	7	7	0	.500	366	306
Oakland Raiders	5	7	2	.417	303	350
Denver Broncos	2	11	1	.154	240	438

- AFL Championship Game
  Buffalo Bills 20, San Diego Chargers 7, December 26, 1964, War Memorial Stadium, Buffalo, New York

== 1965 ==
Eastern Division
Team	W	L	T	PCT	PF	PA
Buffalo Bills	10	3	1	.769	313	226
New York Jets	5	8	1	.385	285	303
Boston Patriots	4	8	2	.333	244	302
Houston Oilers	4	10	0	.286	298	429

Western Division
Team	W	L	T	PCT	PF	PA
San Diego Chargers	9	2	3	.818	340	227
Oakland Raiders	8	5	1	.615	298	239
Kansas City Chiefs	7	5	2	.583	322	285
Denver Broncos	4	10	0	.286	303	392

- AFL Championship Game
  Buffalo Bills 23, San Diego Chargers 0, December 26, 1965, Balboa Stadium, San Diego, California

== 1966 ==
Prior to the season, the AFL-NFL Merger was announced, including both leagues agreeing to play an annual AFL-NFL World Championship Game (later known as the Super Bowl) beginning in January, 1967.

Also, the Miami Dolphins joined the AFL as an expansion team.

Eastern Division
Team	W	L	T	PCT	PF	PA
Buffalo Bills	9	4	1	.692	358	255
Boston Patriots	8	4	2	.677	315	283
New York Jets	6	6	2	.500	322	312
Houston Oilers	3	11	0	.214	335	396
Miami Dolphins	3	11	0	.214	213	362

Western Division
Team	W	L	T	PCT	PF	PA
Kansas City Chiefs	11	2	1	.846	448	276
Oakland Raiders	8	5	1	.615	315	288
San Diego Chargers	7	6	1	.538	335	284
Denver Broncos	4	10	0	.286	196	381

- AFL Championship Game
  Kansas City Chiefs 31, Buffalo Bills 7, January 1, 1967, War Memorial Stadium, Buffalo, New York
- Super Bowl I
  Green Bay Packers (NFL) 35, Kansas City Chiefs (AFL) 10, at Los Angeles Memorial Coliseum, Los Angeles

== 1967 ==
Eastern Division
Team	W	L	T	PCT	PF	PA
Houston Oilers	9	4	1	.692	258	199
New York Jets	8	5	1	.615	371	329
Buffalo Bills	4	10	0	.286	237	285
Miami Dolphins	4	10	0	.286	219	407
Boston Patriots	3	10	1	.231	280	389

Western Division
Team	W	L	T	PCT	PF	PA
Oakland Raiders	13	1	0	.929	468	233
Kansas City Chiefs	9	5	0	.643	408	254
San Diego Chargers	8	5	1	.615	360	352
Denver Broncos	3	11	0	.214	256	409

- AFL Championship Game
  Oakland Raiders 40, Houston Oilers 7, December 31, 1967, Oakland Coliseum, Oakland, California
- Super Bowl II
  Green Bay Packers (NFL) 33, Oakland Raiders (AFL) 14, at Miami Orange Bowl, Miami, Florida

== 1968 ==
The Cincinnati Bengals joined the league as an expansion team.

Eastern Division
Team	W	L	T	PCT	PF	PA
New York Jets	11	3	0	.786	419	280
Houston Oilers	7	7	0	.500	303	248
Miami Dolphins	5	8	1	.385	276	355
Boston Patriots	4	10	0	.286	229	406
Buffalo Bills	1	12	1	.077	199	367

Western Division
Team	W	L	T	PCT	PF	PA
Oakland Raiders	12	2	0	.857	453	233
Kansas City Chiefs	12	2	0	.857	371	170
San Diego Chargers	9	5	0	.643	382	310
Denver Broncos	5	9	0	.357	255	404
Cincinnati Bengals	3	11	0	.214	215	329

- Western Division playoff
  Oakland Raiders 41, Kansas City Chiefs 6, December 22, 1968, Oakland Coliseum, Oakland, California
- AFL Championship Game
  New York Jets 27, Oakland Raiders 23, December 29, 1968, Shea Stadium, New York City
- Super Bowl III
  N.Y. Jets (AFL) 16, Baltimore Colts (NFL) 7, at Miami Orange Bowl, Miami, Florida

== 1969 ==
For its tenth and final season before merging with the NFL, the AFL instituted a four team playoff tournament with the second place teams in each division also participating.

Eastern Division
Team	W	L	T	PCT	PF	PA
New York Jets	10	4	0	.714	353	269
Houston Oilers	6	6	2	.500	278	279
Boston Patriots	4	10	0	.286	266	316
Buffalo Bills	4	10	0	.286	230	359
Miami Dolphins	3	10	1	.231	233	332

Western Division
Team	W	L	T	PCT	PF	PA
Oakland Raiders	12	1	1	.923	377	242
Kansas City Chiefs	11	3	0	.786	359	177
San Diego Chargers	8	6	0	.571	288	276
Denver Broncos	5	8	1	.385	297	344
Cincinnati Bengals	4	9	1	.308	280	367

- Interdivisional playoffs
  - Kansas City Chiefs 13, New York Jets 6, December 20, 1969, Shea Stadium, New York City
  - Oakland Raiders 56, Houston Oilers 7, December 21, 1969, Oakland Coliseum, Oakland, California
- AFL Championship Game
  - Kansas City Chiefs 17, Oakland Raiders 7, January 4, 1970, Oakland Coliseum, Oakland, California
- Super Bowl IV
  Kansas City Chiefs (AFL) 23, Minnesota Vikings (NFL) 7, at Tulane Stadium, New Orleans, Louisiana

== See also ==
- List of NFL seasons
- American Football League win–loss records
