= 1964 Kansas City Chiefs season =

NFL team season

- Owner: Lamar Hunt
- General manager: Jack Steadman
- Head coach: Hank Stram
- Home stadium: Municipal Stadium

Results
- Record: 7–7
- Division place: 2nd AFL Western
- Playoffs: Did not qualify
- AFL All-Stars: QB Len Dawson; HB Abner Haynes; TE Fred Arbanas; OT Jim Tyrer; FB Mack Lee Hill; DE Bobby Bell; DT Jerry Mays; LB Walt Corey; LB E.J. Holub; DB Dave Grayson; S Johnny Robinson; S Bobby Hunt; K Tommy Brooker

The 1964 Kansas City Chiefs season was the fifth season for the Kansas City Chiefs as a professional AFL franchise and second season in Kansas City following their move from Dallas. The Chiefs began the year with a 2–1 mark, then dropped three consecutive games as several of the team's best players, including E.J. Holub, Fred Arbanas, and Johnny Robinson, missed numerous games with injuries. Arbanas missed the final two games of the year after undergoing surgery to his left eye, in which he suffered almost total loss of vision. Running back Mack Lee Hill, who signed with the club as a rookie free agent and received a mere $300 signing bonus, muscled his way into the starting lineup and earned a spot in the AFL All-Star Game.

The club ended the season with a pair of wins to finish at 7–7, runner-up in the AFL Western Division, 1½ games behind the San Diego Chargers. An average attendance of just 18,126 for the seven home games at Municipal Stadium prompted discussion at the AFL owners' meeting about the Chiefs future in Kansas City. Quarterback Lenny Dawson proceeded to have the best season of his career completing 199 passes out of 354 attempts for 2,879 yards and 30 touchdowns with 18 interceptions for a passer rating of 56.2 and a completion percentage of 89.9.

== Personnel ==
=== Roster ===
1964 Kansas City Chiefs roster
Quarterbacks: 16 Len Dawson QB; 12 Eddie Wilson QB / P; 10 Pete Beathard; Running Backs: 30 Jack Spikes P/FB; 23 Bert Coan HB; 32 Curtis McClinton FB; 36 Mack Lee Hill FB; 26 Frank Jackson HB; Wide Receivers / Flankers: 28 Abner Haynes WR / RB / KR; 80 Reggie Carolan WR/FL; 42 Johnny Robinson HB / WR / DB; Tight Ends: 84 Fred Arbanas TE; 88 Chris Burford WR / E	Offensive Linemen: 77 Jim Tyrer LG; 79 Jerry Cornelison T/G; 71 Ed Budde LG; 60 Al Reynolds RG; 61 Dennis Biodrowski G; 65 Jon Gilliam C; 64 Curt Merz RG; 73 Dave Hill RT; Defensive Linemen: 78 Bobby Bell LDE; 76 Hatch Rosdahl DE; 82 Ed Lothamer DE; 75 Jerry Mays DE; 86 Buck Buchanan LDT; 72 John Maczuzak DT; 70 Curt Farrier DT; 87 Mel Branch RDE	Linebackers: 56 Walt Corey RLB; 69 Sherrill Headrick MLB; 35 Smokey Stover LLB; 55 E.J. Holub LLB; 69 Sherrill Headrick MLB; 14 Bobby Ply LB / DB; Defensive Backs: 48 Duane Wood LCB; 25 Charley Warner LCB; 20 Bobby Hunt SS; 45 Dave Grayson RCB; 22 Willie Mitchell DB; Special Teams: 51 Tommy Brooker K / LB; 44 Jerrel Wilson P; Rookies in italics

== Preseason ==
Week	Date	Opponent	Result	Record	Venue	Attendance	Recap
1	August 9	at Oakland Raiders	W 21–14	1–0	Frank Youell Field	18,659	Recap
2	August 14	at Buffalo Bills	W 24–21	2–0	War Memorial Stadium	17,738	Recap
3	August 22	San Diego Chargers	L 14–26	2–1	Municipal Stadium	28,653	Recap
4	August 28	vs. Denver Broncos	W 14–10	3–1	Farrington Field (Fort Worth, TX)	19,500	Recap
5	September 3	at Houston Oilers	W 27–17	4–1	Jeppesen Stadium	17,450	Recap

== Regular season ==
=== Schedule ===
Week	Date	Opponent	Result	Record	Venue	Attendance	Recap
1	September 13	at Buffalo Bills	**L** 17–34	0–1	War Memorial Stadium	30,157	Recap
2	Bye						
3	September 27	at **Oakland Raiders**	**W** 21–9	1–1	Frank Youell Field	18,163	Recap
4	October 4	Houston Oilers	**W** 28–7	2–1	Municipal Stadium	22,727	Recap
5	October 11	at **Denver Broncos**	**L** 27–33	2–2	Bears Stadium	16,285	Recap
6	October 18	Buffalo Bills	**L** 22–35	2–3	Municipal Stadium	20,904	Recap
7	October 23	at Boston Patriots	**L** 7–24	2–4	Fenway Park	27,400	Recap
8	November 1	**Denver Broncos**	**W** 49–39	3–4	Municipal Stadium	15,053	Recap
9	November 8	**Oakland Raiders**	**W** 42–7	4–4	Municipal Stadium	21,023	Recap
10	November 15	**San Diego Chargers**	**L** 14–28	4–5	Municipal Stadium	19,792	Recap
11	November 22	at Houston Oilers	**W** 28–19	5–5	Jeppesen Stadium	17,782	Recap
12	November 29	at New York Jets	**L** 14–27	5–6	Shea Stadium	38,135	Recap
13	December 6	Boston Patriots	**L** 24–31	5–7	Municipal Stadium	13,166	Recap
14	December 13	at **San Diego Chargers**	**W** 49–6	6–7	Balboa Stadium	26,562	Recap
15	December 20	New York Jets	**W** 24–7	7–7	Municipal Stadium	14,316	Recap
Note: Intra-division opponents are in **bold** text

== Standings ==
AFL Western Division
	W	L	T	PCT	DIV	PF	PA	STK
San Diego Chargers	8	5	1	.615	4–2	341	300	L2
Kansas City Chiefs	7	7	0	.500	4–2	366	306	W2
Oakland Raiders	5	7	2	.417	2–3–1	303	350	W2
Denver Broncos	2	11	1	.154	1–4–1	240	438	L2

Note: Tie games were not officially counted in the standings in the AFL.
