= Bobby Bell =

American football player (born 1940)

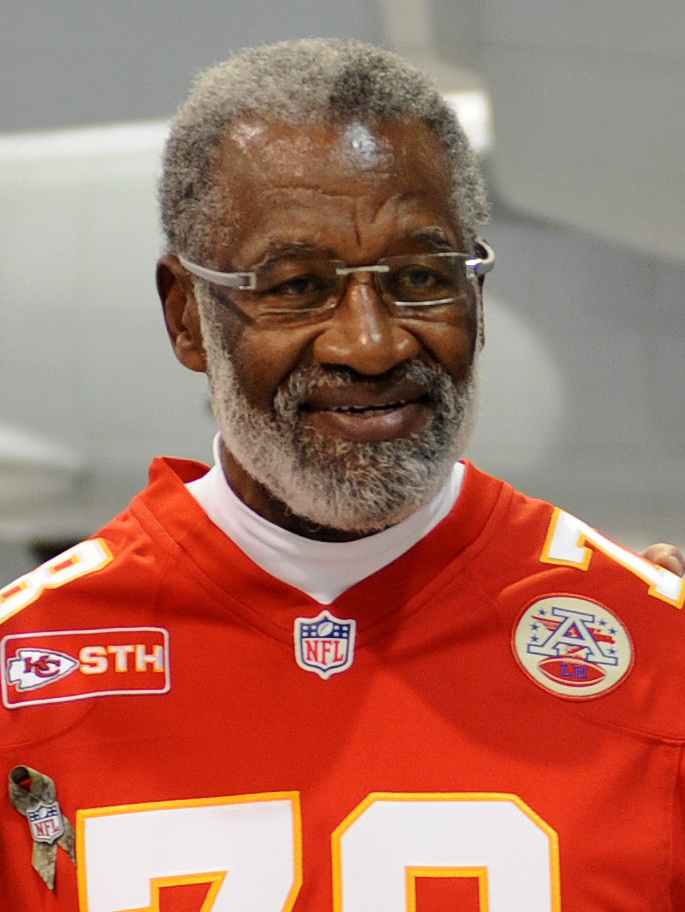
- Bell in 2014

No. 78
- Positions: Linebacker, defensive end

Personal information
- Born: June 17, 1940 (age 86); Shelby, North Carolina, U.S.
- Listed height: 6 ft 4 in (1.93 m)
- Listed weight: 228 lb (103 kg)

Career information
- High school: Cleveland (Shelby)
- College: Minnesota (1960–1962)
- NFL draft: 1963: 2nd round, 16th overall pick
- AFL draft: 1963: 7th round, 56th overall pick

Career history
- Kansas City Chiefs (1963–1974)

Awards and highlights
- Super Bowl champion (IV); AFL champion (1966); First-team All-Pro (1970); 5× First-team All-AFL (1965–1969); Second-team All-Pro (1971); Second-team All-AFL (1964); 3× Pro Bowl (1970–1972); 6× AFL All-Star (1964–1969); NFL 1970s All-Decade Team; NFL 100th Anniversary All-Time Team; AFL All-Time Team; Kansas City Chiefs Hall of Fame; Kansas City Chiefs No. 78 retired; National champion (1960); Outland Trophy (1962); UPI Lineman of the Year (1962); Unanimous All-American (1962); First-team All-American (1961); 2× First-team All-Big Ten (1961, 1962); Minnesota Golden Gophers Jersey No. 78 retired; North Carolina Sports Hall of Fame

Career AFL/NFL statistics
- Sacks: 40
- Interceptions: 26
- Interception yards: 479
- Fumble recoveries: 9
- Defensive touchdowns: 8
- Stats at Pro Football Reference
- Pro Football Hall of Fame
- College Football Hall of Fame

Bobby Lee Bell Sr. (born June 17, 1940) is an American former professional football player who was a linebacker and defensive end for the Kansas City Chiefs of the American Football League (AFL) and the National Football League (NFL). He played college football for the Minnesota Golden Gophers. Bell is a member of the Pro Football Hall of Fame, College Football Hall of Fame, NFL 100th Anniversary All-Time Team, and played on the Chiefs' team that won Super Bowl IV. Paul Zimmerman described him as the first, and prototype, size and speed linebacker.

== Early life ==
Bell was born on June 17, 1940, in the segregated city of Shelby, North Carolina. When he was six years old, he was asleep in the family home, owned by the textile mill employing his father, when it caught fire. His mother, Zannie Lee Bell, broke free from those trying to restrain her from going into the collapsing building, where she crawled on the floor to his bedroom and pulled him out to safety. Bell had a scar on his head from this incident the rest of his life. Bell's father, Pink Lee Bell, worked in various jobs at the town's textile mill.

Bell excelled in several sports at Cleveland High School in Shelby, where he was coached by John Winston in football. He was scouted by the Chicago White Sox for baseball at 16 years old, but his father wanted him to finish school. In his first two years of high school, he played six-man football, playing under center at the position of halfback. During his junior year, his school converted to playing as an 11-man football team, where Bell played quarterback. He would receive All-State honors in football at both halfback and quarterback.

== College career ==
Coach Jim Tatum of the University of North Carolina was interested in Bell to play football, but the school was segregated. Tatum contacted coach Murray Warmath at the University of Minnesota, where Warmath had been recruiting black players. Tatum recommended Bell, and Bell went to Minnesota. At Minnesota, it was the first time he shared a classroom or dining table with whites. Bell was originally a quarterback, but Warmath switched him to the defensive line. Bell would also play offensive tackle and center. Warmath said of Bell, "'He would have been a standout at any position; he was of maximum value to us at tackle.'"

The Gophers with Bell had a record of 22-6-1, were the 1960 National Champions, played in the 1961 Rose Bowl, and won the 1962 Rose Bowl.

He was a two-time first-team All-American (1961 and 1962) and the winner of the 1962 Outland Trophy, which is given to the nation's most outstanding interior lineman. In 1962, he was also named Lineman of the Year by the United Press and the Columbus Touchdown Club as well as Player of the Year by Coach & Athlete Magazine. He also finished third in Heisman Trophy voting.

Bell played superbly on defense in the 1963 Chicago College All Star Game, where the college players upset the defending NFL champion Green Bay Packers. Packers legendary head coach Vince Lombardi called this his most embarrassing loss as a coach.

Bell joined the Alpha Phi Alpha fraternity, via the Mu Chapter, while at the University of Minnesota.

== Professional football career ==
Bell was selected by the Minnesota Vikings of the NFL in the second round (16th overall), and in the seventh round of the AFL draft by the Kansas City Chiefs. He surprisingly chose to join the Chiefs, where he would go on to play for 12 years, first in the American Football League from 1963 through 1969, and then in the NFL from 1970 through 1974. He met with Chiefs owner Lamar Hunt over ice cream on Minnesota's campus, and they agreed to a no-cut guaranteed contract, something the Vikings would not do; in addition to agreeing to a longer term of years than the Vikings offered.

In 1964, Bell was All-AFL as a defensive end, but in 1965, future Pro Football Hall of Fame coach Hank Stram moved Bell to outside linebacker. Stram moved Bell to outside linebacker for his speed to combat the Oakland Raiders' use of running back Clem Daniels as a pass receiver out of the backfield. Bell was then selected first-team All-AFL or All-NFL as a linebacker every year from 1965 to 1971 by the Associated Press, United Press International, the Newspaper Enterprise Association and/or The Sporting News. Bell was an AFL All-Star for six consecutive years, 1964 through 1969, and then an NFL Pro Bowler for four straight years (1970, 1971, 1972, 1973). He was AFL Defensive Player of the Year in 1969. Bell never missed a regular season game, playing in 168 during his professional career.

Bell was one of the first black outside linebackers in professional football. The 1965 AFL All-Star Game was moved from New Orleans to Houston because the black and white players would not have been allowed to dine together in the same New Orleans restaurant.

He was on two AFL Championship teams (1966 and 1969) and a World Championship team, losing Super Bowl I and winning Super Bowl IV. He was named to the first team All-Time All-AFL Team in 1970, along with teammates Jerry Mays, future Hall of Famer Johnny Robinson, Fred Arbanas, Ed Budde, Jim Tyrer, Paul Lowe and Jerrel Wilson on the first team, and future Hall of Famers Buck Buchanan and Len Dawson on the second team.

A total of six defensive players on the Chiefs Super Bowl IV championship team were selected to the Pro Football Hall of Fame (Bell, Buchanan, Curly Culp, Willie Lanier, Emmitt Thomas and Johnny Robinson). Quarterback Len Dawson and kicker Jan Stenerud from that team are also in the Hall of Fame. He played alongside Hall of Fame middle linebacker Willie Lanier, and was part of one of the all-time linebacker trios with Lanier and Jim Lynch.

One of Bell's finest moments came in the 1969 AFL divisional playoff game against the New York Jets. In a critical goal line stand, his key coverage on Jets running back Matt Snell stopped the drive and forced New York to kick a field goal. Jets quarterback Joe Namath was stunned Bell was in coverage and said it would have otherwise been a touchdown and Jets victory. The 13–6 victory over the Jets propelled Kansas City to its first Super Bowl triumph. During a regular-season game against Denver (11/27), the Broncos, trailing 24–17 late in the game, attempted an onside kick that was recovered by Bell, who promptly returned that kick for a 53-yard touchdown.

He was also a blitzer from the linebacker position. Bell played left side linebacker in Stram's "stack defense". Chiefs records show Bell had 40 career quarterback sacks and he might have had more if he had played right linebacker, not the left linebacker. In that era, more often than not the right-side linebacker got the call to "dog" or blitz since more often than not the tight end would be lined up right, on the defense's left.

Bell scored nine touchdowns in his career: six off interceptions (tied for most in NFL history for a linebacker with Derrick Brooks), two more touchdowns off fumble recoveries, and one off an onside kickoff return. In his Hall of Fame induction speech for Bell, Stram described Bell as the only player who could play any position on a winning football team. Stram said that, "He could play all 22 positions on the field, and play them well." In addition to all that, Bell had been a center in college and played long snapper for the Chiefs. He was regarded as one of the greatest long snapper centers for field goals and points-after-touchdowns in NCAA and AFL/NFL history. Kansas City Chiefs' punter Jerrel Wilson, who was selected by the Pro Football Hall of Fame as the punter on the AFL's All-Time Team attributed much of his punting success to Bell's superb long snapping. Wilson called Bell the greatest long snapper in football.

== AFL/NFL career statistics ==
Legend
	PFW NFL Defensive Player of the Year
	Won the Super Bowl
	Led the league
**Bold**	Career high

=== Regular season ===
Year	Team	Games		Sck	Interceptions					Fumbles			
Year	Team	GP	GS	Sck	Int	Yds	Y/I	Lng	TD	FR	Yds	Y/F	TD
1963	KC	14	11	4.5	1	20	20.0	20	0	0	0	—	0
1964	KC	14	**14**	**7.5**	1	4	4.0	4	0	0	0	—	**1**
1965	KC	14	**14**	7.0	4	73	18.3	38	**1**	0	0	—	0
1966	KC	14	**14**	2.5	2	14	7.0	13	0	0	0	—	**1**
1967	KC	14	12	3.5	4	82	20.5	32	**1**	2	0	**0.0**	0
1968	KC	14	**14**	2.5	**5**	**95**	19.0	50	0	2	0	**0.0**	0
1969	KC	14	**14**	5.0	0	0	—	0	0	**3**	0	**0.0**	0
1970	KC	14	**14**	2.0	3	57	19.0	45	**1**	1	0	**0.0**	0
1971	KC	14	**14**	1.5	1	26	26.0	26	**1**	0	0	—	0
1972	KC	14	**14**	3.5	3	56	18.7	**61**	**1**	1	0	**0.0**	0
1973	KC	14	**14**	0.5	1	24	24.0	24	0	0	0	—	0
1974	KC	14	10	0.0	1	28	**28.0**	28	**1**	0	0	—	0
Career		168	159	40.0	26	479	18.4	61	6	9	0	0.0	2

=== Postseason ===
Year	Team	Games		Sck
Year	Team	GP	GS	Sck
1966	KC	2	2	**1.5**
1968	KC	1	1	0.0
1969	KC	**3**	**3**	1.0
1971	KC	1	1	0.0
Career		7	7	2.5

== Legacy and honors ==
Bell was noted for his one-of-a-kind athleticism. At 6 ft 4 in (1.93 m) and 220 (99.8 kg) or 230 (104.3 kg) pounds, with a 28-inch (71.1 cm) waist and pyramid-like build, he was also reported to have run a 4.4 or 4.5 40-yard dash. Some consider Bell "the greatest all-around athlete to have played football". Bell was possibly the most physically gifted linebacker in professional football history, for his speed at such a size made him ideal at outside linebacker. He was considered one of the finest open-field tacklers in professional football history. He has been called the first great "size and speed" linebacker and the "prototype speed linebacker".

In 2019, Bell was selected to the NFL 100th Anniversary All-Time Team, which also included teammates Buck Buchanan, Willie Lanier (who would become a lifelong friend), and Jan Stenerud. In 1999, he was ranked number 66 on The Sporting News' list of the 100 Greatest Football Players, one above teammate Buck Buchanan. He was number 74 on the Athletic's 2021 list of the best 100 football players of all time.

Bell was inducted into the Pro Football Hall of Fame in 1983. In 1970, he was selected as first-team on the AFL's All-Time Team. In 1991, he was inducted into the College Football Hall of Fame. In 1980, he was inducted into the Kansas City Chiefs Hall of Fame, the first Chief to receive that honor. The Chiefs retired his uniform number 78. He was inducted into the Missouri Sports Hall of Fame in 1995, and named one of its Legends in 2006.

On August 22, 2016, The Tournament of Roses announced Bobby Bell, Ricky Ervins, Tommy Prothro, and Art Spander would be inducted into the Rose Bowl Hall of Fame as the Class of 2016. The Rose Bowl Hall of Fame Induction Ceremony then took place on January 1, 2017, outside the Rose Bowl Stadium, one day before the kickoff of the 103rd Rose Bowl game on Monday, January 2, 2017.

The Bobby Bell Award is presented annually as part of the Thomas A. Simone Annual Memorial Football Awards to a high school player in the greater Kansas City, Missouri area for outstanding small class defensive lineman/linebacker.

While at the University of Minnesota, Bell joined Minnesota's basketball team as a walk-on, becoming its first black player.

== Personal life ==
After his success at the University of Minnesota, Bell was offered the key to the city of Shelby in 1962. Instead, he asked if he could walk into the front door of the ice cream parlor across the street to get an ice-cream cone. Shelby was still a segregated city, and he was refused. There is now an historical marker for Bell in Shelby. On August 28, 2021, there was a Bobby Bell Day in Shelby, that included unveiling a sign for Bobby Bell Boulevard, dedicating a muraled wall of a building with his images, and renaming the City Pavilion the Bobby Bell Pavilion.

After his retirement, he opened Bobby Bell's Bar-b-que in Kansas City, Missouri, which he operated for nearly thirty years. He was a motivational speaker for many years.

Bell left the University of Minnesota 13 credits short of a degree, to play for the Chiefs. At the age of 74, he completed his college degree at Minnesota by finishing the three remaining courses he required. He graduated on May 14, 2015, some 50 years after leaving college to play professional football. He did it to honor his father, who believed that blacks could compete equally with whites in sports and education if given a chance. Before going to Minnesota, Pink Lee Bell had given his son a gold watch, so he would never be late for class. Bell wore that watch 55 years later during his graduation ceremony.

== See also ==
- List of American Football League players
