= Dave Smith (fullback) =

American football player (born 1937)

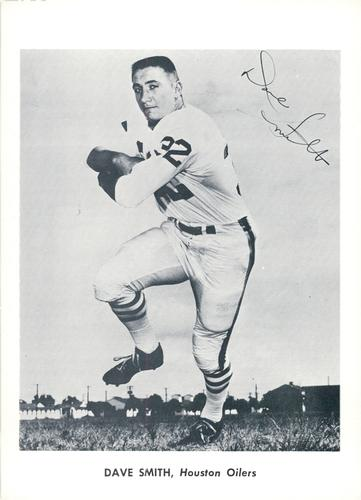

No. 32
- Position: Fullback

Personal information
- Born: March 23, 1937 (age 89); Milwaukee, Wisconsin, U.S.
- Listed height: 6 ft 1 in (1.85 m)
- Listed weight: 210 lb (95 kg)

Career information
- High school: Greendale (Greendale, Wisconsin)
- College: Ripon
- NFL draft: 1959: 21st round, 241st overall pick

Career history
- Houston Oilers (1960-1964)

Awards and highlights
- 2× AFL champion (1960, 1961); TSN All-AFL (1960)

Career AFL statistics
- Rushing yards: 1,368
- Rushing average: 4.2
- Receptions: 80
- Receiving yards: 772
- Total touchdowns: 18
- Stats at Pro Football Reference

Dave Smith (born March 23, 1937, in Milwaukee, Wisconsin) is a former American collegiate and professional football player. A fullback, he attended Greendale High School in Greendale, Wisconsin, before playing collegiately for Ripon College and professionally from 1960 through 1964 for the American Football League (AFL)'s Houston Oilers, where he was a member of the AFL's first two championship teams, in 1960 and 1961. He was selected by Sporting News as the first All-AFL fullback in 1960. The league did not play an All-Star game that first year, but Smith's 154 carries for 643 yards and 5 touchdowns earned him a berth on the All-League Team. Smith later became a scout for the Buffalo Bills.

== AFL career statistics ==
Legend
	Won the AFL championship
**Bold**	Career high

=== Regular season ===
Year	Team	Games		Rushing					Receiving				
Year	Team	GP	GS	Att	Yds	Avg	Lng	TD	Rec	Yds	Avg	Lng	TD
1960	HOU	14	14	**154**	**643**	4.2	**65**	**5**	22	216	9.8	**40**	**2**
1961	HOU	14	1	60	258	4.3	21	2	10	131	**13.1**	37	1
1962	HOU	14	3	56	249	**4.4**	41	1	17	117	6.9	20	**2**
1963	HOU	14	4	50	202	4.0	16	3	**24**	**270**	11.3	36	**2**
1964	HOU	9	0	8	16	2.0	8	0	7	38	5.4	15	0
Career		65	22	328	1,368	4.2	65	11	80	772	9.7	40	7

=== Playoffs ===
Year	Team	Games		Rushing					Receiving				
Year	Team	GP	GS	Att	Yds	Avg	Lng	TD	Rec	Yds	Avg	Lng	TD
1960	HOU	1	1	**19**	**45**	**2.4**	**14**	0	**5**	**52**	**10.4**	**17**	**1**
1961	HOU	1	0	0	0	0.0	0	0	0	0	0.0	0	0
1962	HOU	1	0	2	3	1.5	4	0	1	6	6.0	6	0
Career		3	1	21	48	2.3	14	0	6	58	9.7	17	1
