= Buck Buchanan =

American football player (1940–1992)

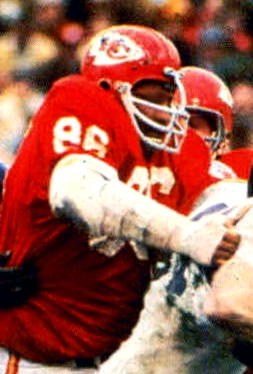
- Buchanan with the Chiefs in Super Bowl IV

No. 86
- Position: Defensive tackle

Personal information
- Born: September 10, 1940; Gainesville, Alabama, U.S.
- Died: July 16, 1992 (aged 51); Kansas City, Missouri, U.S.
- Listed height: 6 ft 7 in (2.01 m)
- Listed weight: 270 lb (122 kg)

Career information
- High school: Parker (Birmingham, Alabama)
- College: Grambling (1959–1962)
- NFL draft: 1963: 19th round, 265th overall pick
- AFL draft: 1963: 1st round, 1st overall pick

Career history

Playing
- Kansas City Chiefs (1963–1975)

Coaching
- New Orleans Saints (1976–1977) Defensive line coach; Cleveland Browns (1978) Defensive line coach

Awards and highlights
- Super Bowl champion (IV); Second-team All-Pro (1971); 2× Pro Bowl (1970, 1971); NFL 100th Anniversary All-Time Team; AFL champion (1966); 6× AFL All-Star (1964–1969); 6× First-team All-AFL (1964–1969); AFL All-Time Team; Kansas City Chiefs Hall of Fame; Kansas City Chiefs No. 86 retired; First-team Little All-American (1962)

Career NFL/AFL statistics
- Safeties: 1
- Interceptions: 3
- Fumble recoveries: 3
- Stats at Pro Football Reference
- Pro Football Hall of Fame
- College Football Hall of Fame

Junious "Buck" Buchanan (September 10, 1940 – July 16, 1992) was an American professional football player who was a defensive tackle for the Kansas City Chiefs in the American Football League (AFL) and National Football League (NFL). Buchanan was inducted into the College Football Hall of Fame in 1996 and the Pro Football Hall of Fame in 1990. He was selected to the NFL 100th Anniversary Team. His was the first African American taken as the first selection in an AFL or NFL draft. Buchanan was massive for his era, standing at 6 ft 7 in (2.01 m), and weighing 270 lbs. (122 kg). His height gave him an advantage against linemen in the trenches.

== Early life ==
It has been reported in multiple sources that Buchanan was born in Gainesville, Alabama, on September 10, 1940. He was born to steelworker Wallace Buchanan and Fannie Mae Buchanan. He had two brothers and two sisters. The family left Gainesville in 1941, and moved to Birmingham, Alabama. Consistent with a photograph of the headstone at his grave, which says "1939 1992", however, it has also been stated he was born in 1939.

Buchanan attended A. H. Parker High School in Birmingham, Alabama, where he was the captain and a standout player in both football and basketball. He graduated in January 1959. He was originally better known for basketball, averaging nearly 20 points per game at center, and only began playing football as a junior; in part to stay in shape for the basketball season. He was All-State in basketball in 1957 and 1958 and All-Conference in football. It has also been reported he was All-County and honorable mention All-State in basketball; and that he was All-State in football. He was 6 ft 5 in (1.96 m) and 210 lb. (95.3 kg) as a senior in high school.

The person who may have most inspired Buchanan was his older brother, Wallace III. His brother was enthusiastic about sports, but was limited from playing by a congenital heart defect; ultimately leading to Wallace's early death in 1968. In high school, Buchanan vowed to himself that since Wallace could not play, Buchanan would play for him. Buchanan said of his brother Wallace, "'He inspired me ... He got me going. I've never forgotten'".

== College career ==
Grambling State University's future College Football Hall of Fame head coach Eddie Robinson offered Buchanan a scholarship, after being contacted by Buchanan's uncle, Glennon Threat. Threatt was determined Buchanan should go to college and wrote to Robinson about Buchanan's athletic merits. Buchanan had decided to start working, rather than going to college, before Threatt (who coached football in Birmingham) told Buchanan that Grambling was interested in him. It was Buchanan's mother who was the decisive factor in sending Buchanan to Grambling, after his uncle's efforts opened the door. Buchanan was also approached by Alabama State University, but chose Grambling, located in Louisiana, as Grambling was better known and offered a more substantial scholarship. By the time he reached Grambling, his weight had grown to 285 lb (129.3 kg).

Buchanan was a letterman in football. As a junior, he was named an Academic All-American after the 1961 season, the only Southwestern Athletic Conference (SWAC) player selected. As a senior in 1962, Buchanan was a National Association of Intercollegiate Athletics (NAIA) All-America selection, as well as a Black College All-American. From 1960 to 1962, he was selected three times to the All-SWAC Team at defensive tackle. Among others, during his career at Grambling Buchanan's teammates included future AFL players Ernie Ladd and Ladd's uncle, Garland Boyette. He also played offensive tackle at Grambling.

Buchanan played defensive tackle in the 1963 Chicago College All Star Game where the college All-Stars defeated the 1962 NFL champion Green Bay Packers. His college All-Star teammates included two future Kansas City Chiefs' teammates Bobby Bell and Ed Budde, who would play with Buchanan on the Chiefs for 14 and 15 seasons, respectively.

Buchanan also played on Grambling's basketball team. Among his teammates were future Naismith Memorial Basketball Hall of Fame player Willis Reed, and future AFL player and Chiefs' teammate Ernie Ladd. Buchanan left the team after one year to focus on football.

Buchanan was also a sprinter and distance runner on the track team. He was timed at 10.4 seconds in the 100-yard dash, 22.5 seconds in the 220-yard dash and 49.2 seconds in the 440-yard dash. He ran the 40-yard dash in less than five seconds. He also reportedly ran 4.9 in the 40-yard dash and 10.2 in the 100-yard dash at Grambling. As stated by the Pro Football Hall of Fame description of Buchanan, his speed was valuable as a defensive lineman in football because it allowed him to "range from sideline to sideline to make tackles".

== Professional career ==
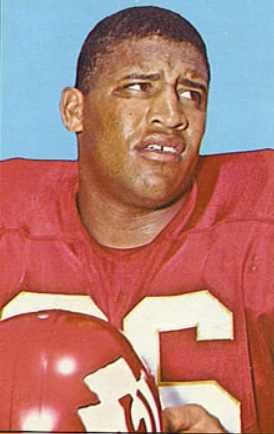
1965 Topps card of Buchanan for Kansas City Chiefs

The 6 ft 7 in (2.01 m) 287 lb (130 kg) or 270 lb (122.5 kg) Buchanan was selected in both the 1963 AFL and NFL drafts. The Dallas Texans, who would become the Kansas City Chiefs before the 1963 season started, selected Buchanan with the first overall pick in the 1963 AFL draft, held on December 1, 1962. Buchanan signed a two-year contract with the Texans the same day he was drafted, receiving a five-figure signing bonus, and becoming one of the nation's highest paid players. The Texans had won the 1962 AFL championship, but obtained the first draft pick via an early season trade with the Oakland Raiders, sending quarterback Cotton Davidson to the Raiders for the rights to Fred Miller and the Raiders first draft choice in the 1963 draft.

After the trade with Oakland, the Texans sent Don Klosterman to scout Buchanan regularly at Grambling during the 1962 college football season. Klosterman started calling him Junious Buck (to distinguish Buchanan from his father "Big Buck"), which eventually became just Buck. After drafting Buchanan, Klosterman said "'If there's a better lineman in any college I want to see him'". Buchanan was both the first player from an historically black college, and the first black player, selected as a number one draft choice in AFL or NFL history. A few days after the AFL draft, the New York Giants took Buchanan 265th overall in the 19th round of the 1963 NFL draft.

Buchanan signed with the Texans without waiting for the NFL draft because, among other things, at the time he "thought there would be more opportunity" for him playing with the Texans. He later made clear there were broader reasons as well: "'I signed with them because I considered it an honor to be the first player chosen by the league . . . . I thought it was very significant to have that honor, since I had played for a small black school. I was determined to prove that players from small schools could play in the big leagues'".

Buchanan began his career under future Hall of Fame head coach Hank Stram, who would be his head coach for all but one season (1975). He started 11 games at left defensive tackle as a rookie in 1963, at times playing next to Bobby Bell at left defensive end. In 1964, Stram moved Buchanan to right tackle where he started all 14 games for the Chiefs, and would play the rest of his career. Buchanan was selected to the AFL Western Division All-Star Team. He was named second-team All-AFL by the Associated Press (AP), Newspaper Enterprise Association (NEA) and United Press International (UPI). Quarterback sacks did not become an official statistic in the NFL until 1982. Buchanan has been unofficially credited with seven sacks in 1964.

In 1965, Buchanan again started every Chiefs' game at right defensive tackle, and once more had seven sacks. He was selected to play in the AFL All-Star Game, and was once again named second-team All-AFL by the AP, NEA and UPI. He was chosen as the team's Most Valuable Player in 1965.

The Chiefs were 11–2–1 in 1966, and won the AFL championship, defeating the Buffalo Bills 31–7 in the championship game. Buchanan had a quarterback sack of future Hall of Fame quarterback Jack Kemp in the championship game. During the regular season, Buchanan started all 14 games at right tackle, with 2.5 sacks. He was again an All-Star, and for the first time was selected first-team All-AFL by the AP and UPI, as well as The Sporting News; with the NEA naming him second-team All-AFL. In January 1967, he played in the first Super Bowl, against the Green Bay Packers, the Chiefs losing 35–10. Buchanan recorded the first quarterback sack in Super Bowl history, against Packers Hall of Fame quarterback Bart Starr. He had five solo tackles in the Super Bowl, including four tackles stopping future Hall of Fame fullback Jim Taylor for three-yard gains on four different running plays.

Buchanan had 8.5 sacks in 1967, again starting all 14 regular season games. Although the Chiefs were 9–5, they missed the playoffs. Buchanan was again named an All-Star, and was selected first-team All-AFL by the AP, NEA, UPI and The Sporting News. As stated by the Pro Football Hall of Fame, Buchanan "was particularly effective at intimidating the passer". In 1967 alone, "he batted down 16 opposition passes at or behind the line of scrimmage". It has also been reported he batted down 16 passes in 1964. He was again chosen as the Chiefs' Most Valuable Player in 1967.

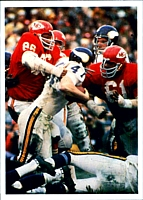
Buchanan (left) and fellow Football Hall of Famer Curley Culp stop a Vikings running play during Super Bowl IV

The Chiefs made him a co-captain in 1968. He finished the season with seven sacks and a safety, again starting all 14 games. He was an All-Star for the fifth consecutive season, and AP first team All-AFL for the third consecutive season.

In 1969, the Chiefs had an 11–3 record, and won another AFL title. Buchanan again started all 14 games at right tackle, and had 6.5 sacks. He was once again named an All-Star and selected first team All-AFL by the Associated Press. He teamed with future Hall of Fame left tackle Curley Culp, Aaron Brown (right end) and Jerry Mays (left end) to form one of the best defensive lines in AFL or NFL history. The defense also included, among others, Hall of Famers Bobby Bell (left linebacker), Willie Lanier (middle linebacker), Emmitt Thomas (right cornerback) and Johnny Robinson (free safety). The 1969 Chiefs' defense led the AFL by allowing only 177 points in 14 games, with the next lowest team allowing 242 points. They also led the AFL in fewest total yards (3,163), fewest passing yards (2,072) and fewest running yards allowed (1,091).

The Chiefs defeated the New York Jets in the divisional round of the 1969 playoffs, 13–6; with Buchanan recording .5 sacks. They next defeated the Oakland Raiders in the 1969 AFL Championship Game, 17–7. The Chiefs then defeated the Minnesota Vikings 23–7 in Super Bowl IV; Buchanan recording a sack of Vikings' quarterback Joe Kapp for an eight-yard loss, and five solo tackles.

The Chiefs’ defense allowed Viking runners only 67 yards rushing in 19 carries, 172 net passing yards, and only two rushing first downs, to go along with three interceptions and two fumble recoveries. Buchanan and Culp in particular dominated the opposing center, Mick Tingelhoff, a five-time AP first-team All-Pro selection up to that 1969 season, and Buchanan did the same to the left guard playing opposite him on the line of scrimmage, Jim Vellone. Buchanan later said that he did not find the Vikings as tough to play against as the Oakland Raiders.

Super Bowl IV was the final game played by an AFL team. The AFL and NFL fully merged before the 1970 season into one 26-team league (the NFL). The Chiefs missed the playoffs in 1970, with a 7–5–2 record. In 1970, Buchanan once again started all 14 games at right tackle. He had seven sacks, and was selected to play in the Pro Bowl for the new American Football Conference (AFC); but was not the equivalent of All-Pro for the first time since 1964. He was named first-team All-AFC by the Associated Press and second-team All-AFC by UPI.

The Chiefs reached the AFC playoffs in 1971, but lost in the divisional round in sudden death double overtime to the Miami Dolphins, 27–24. This is the longest game in NFL history. Buchanan started all 14 games again that season, with five sacks and one interception. He was selected to play in the Pro Bowl for the second and final time. The UPI named him second-team All-AFC, and Pro Football Weekly named him first-team All-AFC.

The Chiefs steadily declined after 1971, winning eight games in 1972, seven in 1973, and only five in both 1974 and 1975. Buchanan started every Chiefs game in 1972 and 1973, finishing with 6.5 sacks and 7.5 sacks and one interception respectively in those years. In 1974 he started only nine games with one sack, and in his final season (1975), he started 12 games without a sack.

== Legacy and honors ==
In 1990, Buchanan was inducted into the Pro Football Hall of Fame, the first AFL defensive lineman to be selected. In 2019, he was selected to the NFL 100th Anniversary All Time Team, along with Chiefs' defensive teammates Bell and Lanier, and kicker Jan Stenerud. In January 1970, he was selected to the second team of the Pro Football Hall of Fame's AFL All-Time Team. In 1981, the Chiefs inducted Buchanan into their Hall of Honor and retired his uniform No. 86. In 1986, Buchanan was inducted into the Louisiana Sports Hall of Fame. In 1987, he was inducted into the Alabama Sports Hall of Fame.

Buchanan was inducted into the College Football Hall of Fame in 1996. He was inducted into the NAIA Hall of Fame in 1968. He is one of four Grambling State players, along with Willie Brown, Willie Davis, and Charlie Joiner, who were coached by Eddie Robinson that have been enshrined in the Pro Football Hall of Fame. Coming out of college and into professional football Robinson called him "the finest lineman I have seen"; a view broadly held. In 1999, Sports Illustrated included him on its All-Century Team for college football. He was inducted into the Grambling University Hall of Fame in 1987, and in 2009, he was in the inaugural class of the Grambling Legends Sports Hall of Fame.

The FCS (Football Championship Subdivision) presents the Buck Buchanan Award annually to the FCS's best defensive player. The Buck Buchanan Award is presented annually as part of the Thomas A. Simone Annual Memorial Football Awards to a high school player in the greater Kansas City, Missouri area as the outstanding big class defensive lineman/linebacker.

Hall of Fame guard Gene Upshaw of the Chiefs' archrival Oakland Raiders said playing against Buchanan was like trying to block a ghost, and while he enjoyed most challenges he could not sleep the night before games against Buchanan. Upshaw's coach, Hall of Famer John Madden, said Buchanan revolutionized football. Raiders owner Al Davis had specifically drafted Upshaw to combat Buchanan. At the time of Buchanan's death in 1992, Chiefs' owner Lamar Hunt said "'if there is a Mr. Kansas City Chief, it would certainly have to be Buck Buchanan'". Buchanan's defensive line coach Tom Pratt observed the importance of Buchanan's leadership among his teammates, "'Buck was always a leader. A lot of times, as a coach, you have to rely on the players to be leaders. And Buck was always there'".

In 1999, Buchanan was ranked No. 67 on The Sporting News' list of the 100 Greatest Football Players, right behind his former Chiefs teammate Bobby Bell, and above his former teammate Emmitt Thomas. Willie Lanier was at number 42. In 2021, The Athletic ranked him 86th on its list of all-time greatest football players. The defensive line of Buchanan, Culp, Brown and Mays has been rated among the top 10 defensive lines in AFL/NFL history.

He was named to his first AFL All-Star Game after his second season and played in six AFL All-Star games and two AFC-NFC Pro Bowls. He was first-team All-AFL from 1966 through 1969, and All-AFC in 1970 and 1971.

"In spite of the weekly pounding he took on the line of scrimmage, Buchanan was extremely durable. He played in 182 career games that included a string of 166 straight", and missed only one game in 13 years because of a broken hand in 1974's season opening game. He played with the broken hand for the remainder of the season after missing the one game.

== Coaching and media career ==
Buchanan retired from playing in February 1976, and was hired immediately as a defensive line coach by the New Orleans Saints' new head coach Hank Stram (Buchanan's coach from 1963 to 1974 in Kansas City). The Chiefs had fired Stram at the end of the 1974 season, after coaching the franchise for 15 years since its AFL inception. Chiefs' owner Lamar Hunt convinced Saints owner John Mecom Jr. to hire Stram as head coach in early 1976. Stram coached two years for the Saints, and was fired after the 1977 season. After two years as Stram's defensive line coach in New Orleans, Buchanan went on to coach the Cleveland Browns' defensive line in 1978, but resigned for personal reasons after one year. He later explained that he thought the chances for there being a black head football coach remained slim, and he missed being with his family who remained in Kansas City while he was in Cleveland. Buchanan also worked as a radio announcer for Chiefs' games after his coaching career ended.

== Personal life and death ==
Buchanan supported the 1972 presidential candidacy of Senator George McGovern. He and other pro-McGovern football players were seen as a valuable asset by the campaign because they helped counter McGovern's mild-mannered, "soft" reputation.

After leaving football, Buchanan moved back to Kansas City and became a highly respected businessman and civic leader. Among other things, he ran a construction and advertising business, operated a restaurant, became president of the Black Chamber of Commerce (1986-1989), and was appointed to the Kansas City Board of Election Commissioners in 1989 by Governor John Ashcroft. In 1990, he received the Golden Torch award from the University of Missouri–Kansas City. In 1991, Mayor Emanuel Cleaver of Kansas City appointed Buchanan to the Kansas City Downtown Minority Development Corporation. In 1992, he received the Kansas City Spirit Award.

Buchanan also appeared in a series of humorous Miller Lite Beer commercials.

Buchanan was also known for his attitude and positive effect on others. Before presenting Buchanan for induction into the Pro Football Hall of Fame, Hank Stram alluded to his physical skills and also his "great, great attitude" and "big personality". Lamar Hunt described Buchanan's qualities reaching beyond football, and always being "'a positive terrific leader'". Mayor Cleaver called Buchanan "'a giant on the field, a giant in the church and a giant in the community'". Edward Pendleton, a civic leader in Kansas City, described Buchanan as sincere person, lacking self-interest and acting without hidden agendas; but rather having a "'genuine interest in improving everybody'". He also said Buchanan was a "'major influence in Kansas City'".

Former Chiefs' executive Carl Peterson described Buchanan's gentle demeanor, humility, dignity and extraordinary ability to communicate with people from all walks of life, and the great contributions he made to his former team. His Chiefs teammates reported that he had great compassion and a desire to help others; that he never rejected a request from them if they needed something, or to appear at charity events if they asked him to do so.

Buchanan was diagnosed with lung cancer a week before his Pro Football Hall of Fame induction ceremony in 1990, and died two years later at age 52 in his Kansas City home, on July 16, 1992. Buchanan never mentioned his cancer diagnosis during his Hall of Fame induction speech or earlier, because he did not want to spoil the day for the other inductees. He was survived by his wife and three children.

== See also ==
- Buck Buchanan Award
- List of American Football League players
