= Charley Warner =

American football player (1940–2016)

No. 25, 22
- Position: Defensive back

Personal information
- Born: April 14, 1940; Granger, Texas, U.S.
- Died: September 19, 2016 (aged 76); Granger, Texas, U.S.

Career information
- College: Prairie View

Career history
- Kansas City Chiefs (1963–1964); Buffalo Bills (1964–1966)

Awards and highlights
- American Football League Champion (1964, 1965)

Career statistics
- Interceptions: 7
- Touchdowns: 1
- Stats at Pro Football Reference

Charles Allen Warner (April 14, 1940 – September 19, 2016) was a defensive back who played collegiate football for the Prairie View Panthers and Professional Football in the American Football League. He played for the Kansas City Chiefs and Buffalo Bills. He joined the Bills in 1964 and was part of the defensive team that compiled a string of seventeen consecutive games without allowing a rushing touchdown by an opponent, a Professional Football record that helped the team to consecutive AFL championships in 1964 and 1965. Warner had 5 interceptions in the 1965 season, helping the Bills achieve a league-leading 37 'picks'.

== See also ==
Other American Football League players
