= 1964 American Football League season =

American Football League season

1964 AFL season

Regular season
- Duration: September 12 – December 20, 1964

Playoffs
- Date: December 26, 1964
- Eastern champion: Buffalo Bills
- Western champion: San Diego Chargers
- Site: War Memorial Stadium, Buffalo, New York
- Champion: Buffalo Bills

AFL teams: West, East

The 1964 AFL season was the fifth regular season of the American Football League.

The season ended when the Buffalo Bills defeated the San Diego Chargers in the AFL Championship game.

This was the final season of AFL telecasts on ABC before the games moved to NBC for the following season.

== Division races ==
The AFL had 8 teams, grouped into two divisions. Each team would play a home-and-away game against the other 7 teams in the league for a total of 14 games, and the best team in the Eastern Division would play against the best in the Western Division in a championship game. If there was a tie in the standings at the top of either division, a one-game playoff would be held to determine the division winner.

The Buffalo Bills won their first nine games, before Boston beat them at home on November 15, 36–28. Buffalo came back from a 24–14 deficit at San Diego on Thanksgiving Day to eke out a 27–24 win. On December 6 at Oakland, the Raiders beat the Bills on the final play of the game, 16–13, and did not try for an extra point. Boston won at Kansas City, 31–24, to take Buffalo's lead away. In Week Fourteen, Boston was idle, and Buffalo took a 1/2 game lead with a 30–19 win at Denver. As it turned out, the Eastern Division title would come down to the final game of the season, with Buffalo (11–2–0) traveling to Boston (10–2–1) on December 20, with the winner to take all. Jack Kemp led the Bills to three touchdowns for a 24–14 win to capture the title.

The Western Division race was less dramatic. In Week Six, the Chargers took a lead over the Chiefs during a six-game winning streak, and held that lead for the rest of the season.

Week	Eastern		Western	
1	Tie (Bos, Buf, NYJ)	1–0–0	San Diego	1–0–0
2	Tie (Bos, Buf)	1–1–0	San Diego	1–1–0
3	Tie (Bos, Buf)	3–0–0	Kansas City	1–1–0
4	Tie (Bos, Buf)	4–0–0	Kansas City	2–1–0
5	Buffalo	5–0–0	Kansas City	2–2–0
6	Buffalo	6–0–0	San Diego	3–2–1
7	Buffalo	7–0–0	San Diego	4–2–1
8	Buffalo	8–0–0	San Diego	5–2–1
9	Buffalo	9–0–0	San Diego	6–2–1
10	Buffalo	9–1–0	San Diego	7–2–1
11	Buffalo	9–1–0	San Diego	7–2–1
12	Buffalo	10–1–0	San Diego	7–3–1
13	Boston	10–2–1	San Diego	8–3–1
14	Buffalo	11–2–0	San Diego	8–4–1
15	Buffalo	12–2–0	San Diego	8–5–1

== Regular season ==
=== Results ===
Home/Road		Eastern Division				Western Division			
Home/Road		BOS	BUF	HOU	NY	DEN	KC	OAK	SD
Eastern	Boston Patriots		14–24	25–24	26–10	12–7	24–7	43–43	17–26
Eastern	Buffalo Bills	28–36		24–10	34–24	30–13	34–17	23–20	30–3
Eastern	Houston Oilers	17–34	17–48		33–17	34–15	19–28	42–28	17–20
Eastern	New York Jets	35–14	7–20	24–21		30–6	27–14	35–13	17–17
Western	Denver Broncos	10–39	19–30	17–38	20–16		33–27	20–20	20–31
Western	Kansas City Chiefs	24–31	22–35	28–7	24–7	49–39		42–7	14–28
Western	Oakland Raiders	14–17	16–13	20–10	35–26	40–7	9–21		21–20
Western	San Diego Chargers	28–33	24–27	27–21	38–3	42–14	6–49	31–17	

=== Standings ===
AFL Eastern Division
	W	L	T	PCT	DIV	PF	PA	STK
Buffalo Bills	12	2	0	.857	5–1	400	242	W2
Boston Patriots	10	3	1	.769	4–2	365	297	L1
New York Jets	5	8	1	.385	2–4	278	315	L3
Houston Oilers	4	10	0	.286	1–5	310	355	W2

Note: Tie games were not officially counted in the standings in the AFL.

AFL Western Division
	W	L	T	PCT	DIV	PF	PA	STK
San Diego Chargers	8	5	1	.615	4–2	341	300	L2
Kansas City Chiefs	7	7	0	.500	4–2	366	306	W2
Oakland Raiders	5	7	2	.417	2–3–1	303	350	W2
Denver Broncos	2	11	1	.154	1–4–1	240	438	L2

== Playoffs ==
AFL Championship Game
December 26, 1964 – War Memorial Stadium
San Diego Chargers	7
Buffalo Bills	20

== Stadium changes ==
- The New York Jets moved from the Polo Grounds to Shea Stadium

== Coaching changes ==
=== Offseason ===
- Houston Oilers: Pop Ivy was fired and replaced by Sammy Baugh.

=== In-season ===
- Denver Broncos: Jack Faulkner was fired after four games. Mac Speedie was named as replacement.

== See also ==
- 1964 NFL season
