= Carroll Martin =

American sports executive (1914–1985)

Carroll Martin (1914–1985) was the general manager of the Houston Oilers and an executive in the front office of the American Football League in the 1960s.

Martin was born in North Carolina in 1914 and moved to Houston in 1932 to attend Rice University. While at Rice, Martin became involved with the school's ticket sales program. After his graduation, Rice administrators hired Martin to be in charge of the university’s ticket operations. This experience led to additional positions promoting ticket sales for various Houston area sporting events, including the head of ticket operations for the Houston Fat Stock Show (now known as the Houston Livestock Show and Rodeo), head of ticket operations for the 1947 Houston Buffs (minor league baseball team), and head of ticket operations for the inaugural Bluebonnet Bowl (college football bowl game) in 1959.

In 1960, Houston business executive, Bud Adams, helped launch a new American professional football league, the American Football League (AFL). Adams hired Martin as director of ticket sales for the AFL’s Houston franchise, the Houston Oilers. In March 1963, Adams promoted to Martin to assistant general manager. In June 1964, Adams promoted Martin to general manager when Adams dismissed the Oilers head coach and general manager, Pop Ivy, following a disappointing 1963 season. After two years as the Oilers general manager where the team finished with two consecutive 4–10 seasons, AFL commissioner Al Davis hired Martin into the front office of the AFL in 1966 where he served as the league’s administrative assistant. In 1969, the AFL merged with the National Football League (NFL). All of the former AFL teams, including the Houston Oilers, joined the NFL. In 1997, the Houston Oilers moved to Tennessee and exists today as the Tennessee Titans.

Martin died in 1985, leaving behind his wife, Mary Helen, and two children, Helen Carol and Robin. He is buried at Memorial Oaks Cemetery in Houston Texas.
