= 1964 Oakland Raiders season =

AFL team season

- Owner: F. Wayne Valley
- General manager: Al Davis
- Head coach: Al Davis
- Home stadium: Frank Youell Field

Results
- Record: 5–7–2
- Division place: 3rd AFL Western
- Playoffs: Did not qualify

The 1964 Oakland Raiders season was the team's fifth in both Oakland and the American Football League. The campaign saw the team attempt to improve upon its impressive 10–4 record from 1963. The Raiders' efforts, however, would prove fruitless. The team staggered out to an abysmal 1–7–1 record over its first nine games. While the Raiders pulled themselves together over the final five games of the season (in what amounted to a 4–0–1 run), their slow start ensured that they would miss the postseason for a fifth consecutive year.

During the preseason, the Raiders played the Houston Oilers in Las Vegas at Cashman Field in the first professional football game ever held there. 56 years later, the Raiders would relocate to the Las Vegas metropolitan area and play at the newly-built Allegiant Stadium starting in 2020.

After this season, the Raiders would not finish lower than second place in the AFL/AFC West again until 1979 and would not have another losing season until 1981.

The Raiders' 43–43 tie at Boston October 16 remains the highest scoring draw in professional football history as of 2024.

== Roster ==
1964 Oakland Raiders roster
Quarterbacks (QB): 19 Cotton Davidson; 15 Tom Flores; Running backs (RB): 33 Billy Cannon; 36 Clem Daniels; 32 Bob Jackson; 21 Gene Mingo; Wide receivers (WR): 89 Bill Miller; 84 Art Powell; 40 Bo Roberson; Tight ends (TE): 82 Jan Barrett; 86 Ken Herock	Offensive linemen (OL): 65 Wayne Hawkins G; 70 Dick Klein T; 67 Bob Mischak G; 00 Jim Otto C; 75 Ken Rice T; 78 Frank Youso T; Defensive linemen (DL): 80 Dalva Allen DE; 53 Dan Birdwell DT/DE; 74 Doug Brown DT; 46 Dave Costa DT; 83 Ben Davidson DE; 87 Rex Mirich DT	Linebackers (LB): 60 Dan Conners MLB; 56 Archie Matsos MLB; 52 J. R. Williamson OLB; 81 Clancy Osborne OLB; Defensive backs (DB): 25 Claude Gibson S/CB; 27 Joe Krakoski SS; 35 Tom Morrow FS; 20 Warren Powers FS; 29 Howie Williams CB; 24 Fred Williamson CB; Special teams (ST): 10 Mike Mercer K/P	Practice squad: 44 Fred Gillett WR; -- Lee Grosscup QB; -- Wendell Hayes RB; -- Maury Schleicher LB; Reserve: 48 Bill Budness LB (IR); 22 Louis Guy CB (IR); 77 Proverb Jacobs T (IR); 88 Jon Jelacic DE (IR); 37 Alan Miller RB (DNR); Rookies in italics

== Season schedule ==
Week	Date	Opponent	Result	Record	Venue	Attendance	Recap
1	September 13	Boston Patriots	**L** 14–17	0–1	Frank Youell Field	21,126	Recap
2	September 19	at Houston Oilers	**L** 28–42	0–2	Jeppesen Stadium	26,482	Recap
3	September 27	**Kansas City Chiefs**	**L** 9–21	0–3	Frank Youell Field	18,163	Recap
4	October 3	at Buffalo Bills	**L** 20–23	0–4	War Memorial Stadium	36,451	Recap
5	October 10	at New York Jets	**L** 13–35	0–5	Shea Stadium	36,499	Recap
6	October 16	at Boston Patriots	**T** 43–43	0–5–1	Fenway Park	23,279	Recap
7	October 25	**Denver Broncos**	**W** 40–7	1–5–1	Frank Youell Field	17,858	Recap
8	November 1	at **San Diego Chargers**	**L** 17–31	1–6–1	Balboa Stadium	25,557	Recap
9	November 8	at **Kansas City Chiefs**	**L** 7–42	1–7–1	Municipal Stadium	21,023	Recap
10	November 15	Houston Oilers	**W** 20–10	2–7–1	Frank Youell Field	16,375	Recap
11	November 22	New York Jets	**W** 35–26	3–7–1	Frank Youell Field	15,589	Recap
12	November 29	at **Denver Broncos**	**T** 20–20	3–7–2	Bears Stadium	15,958	Recap
13	December 6	Buffalo Bills	**W** 16–13	4–7–2	Frank Youell Field	18,134	Recap
14	Bye						
15	December 20	**San Diego Chargers**	**W** 21–20	5–7–2	Frank Youell Field	20,124	Recap
Note: Intra-division opponents are in **bold** text.

== Standings ==
AFL Western Division
	W	L	T	PCT	DIV	PF	PA	STK
San Diego Chargers	8	5	1	.615	4–2	341	300	L2
Kansas City Chiefs	7	7	0	.500	4–2	366	306	W2
Oakland Raiders	5	7	2	.417	2–3–1	303	350	W2
Denver Broncos	2	11	1	.154	1–4–1	240	438	L2

Note: Tie games were not officially counted in the standings in the AFL.

== Season summary ==
=== Week 15 vs Chargers ===
Week Fifteen: San Diego Chargers (8–4–1) at Oakland Raiders (4–7–2)

Quarter	1	2	3	4	Total
Chargers	3	7	10	0	20
Raiders	0	14	0	7	21

at Frank Youell Field, Oakland, California

- Date: December 20
- Game weather: 57 °F (14 °C)
- Game attendance: 20,124
- Box Score

Game information

First quarter

- SD – Keith Lincoln 17-yard field goal. Chargers 3–0. Drive:

Second quarter

- SD – Paul Lowe 41-yard pass from John Hadl (Keith Lincoln kick). Chargers 10–0. Drive:
- OAK – Art Powell 26-yard pass from Tom Flores (Mike Mercer kick). Chargers 10–7. Drive:
- OAK – Gene Mingo 10-yard pass from Tom Flores (Mike Mercer kick). Raiders 14–10. Drive:

Third quarter

- SD – Paul Lowe 28-yard run (Keith Lincoln kick). Chargers 17–14. Drive:
- SD – Keith Lincoln 33-yard field goal. Chargers 20–14. Drive:

Fourth quarter

- OAK – Billy Cannon 13-yard pass from Tom Flores (Mike Mercer kick). Raiders 21–20. Drive:

Top passers

- SD – John Hadl – 10/16, 129 yards, TD, 2 INT
- OAK – Tom Flores – 21/39, 242 yards, 3 TD, 3 INT

Top rushers

- SD – Paul Lowe – 13 rushes, 85 yards, TD
- OAK – Clem Daniels – 16 rushes, 144 yards

Top receivers

- SD – Don Norton – 8 receptions, 98 yards
- OAK – Art Powell – 4 receptions, 60 yards, TD
