= 1964 Houston Oilers season =

NFL team season

- Owner: Bud Adams
- General manager: Carroll Martin
- Head coach: Sammy Baugh
- Home stadium: Jeppesen Stadium

Results
- Record: 4–10
- Division place: 4th AFL Eastern
- Playoffs: Did not qualify

The 1964 Houston Oilers season was the fifth season for the Houston Oilers as a professional AFL franchise; The team failed to improve on their previous output of 6–8, winning only four games. They failed to qualify for the playoffs for the second consecutive season. It was their final season at Jeppesen Stadium before moving their home games to Rice Stadium the following season. The Houston Oilers attempted 592 passes (42.3 per game) in 1964, which is an AFL record.

== Season schedule ==
Week	Date	Opponent	Result	Record	Venue	Attendance	Recap
1	September 12	at San Diego Chargers	**L** 21–27	0–1	Balboa Stadium	22,632	Recap
2	September 19	Oakland Raiders	**W** 42–28	1–1	Jeppesen Stadium	26,482	Recap
3	September 27	at Denver Broncos	**W** 38–17	2–1	Bears Stadium	22,651	Recap
4	October 4	at Kansas City Chiefs	**L** 7–28	2–2	Municipal Stadium	22,727	Recap
5	October 11	**Buffalo Bills**	**L** 17–48	2–3	Jeppesen Stadium	26,218	Recap
6	October 17	at **New York Jets**	**L** 21–24	2–4	Shea Stadium	32,840	Recap
7	October 25	San Diego Chargers	**L** 17–20	2–5	Jeppesen Stadium	21,671	Recap
8	November 1	at **Buffalo Bills**	**L** 10–24	2–6	War Memorial Stadium	40,119	Recap
9	November 6	at **Boston Patriots**	**L** 24–25	2–7	Fenway Park	28,161	Recap
10	November 15	at Oakland Raiders	**L** 10–20	2–8	Frank Youell Field	16,375	Recap
11	November 22	Kansas City Chiefs	**L** 19–28	2–9	Jeppesen Stadium	17,782	Recap
12	November 29	**Boston Patriots**	**L** 17–34	2–10	Jeppesen Stadium	17,560	Recap
13	Bye						
14	December 13	**New York Jets**	**W** 33–17	3–10	Jeppesen Stadium	16,225	Recap
15	December 20	Denver Broncos	**W** 34–15	4–10	Jeppesen Stadium	15,839	Recap
Note: Intra-division opponents are in **bold** text.

== Standings ==
AFL Eastern Division
	W	L	T	PCT	DIV	PF	PA	STK
Buffalo Bills	12	2	0	.857	5–1	400	242	W2
Boston Patriots	10	3	1	.769	4–2	365	297	L1
New York Jets	5	8	1	.385	2–4	278	315	L3
Houston Oilers	4	10	0	.286	1–5	310	355	W2

Note: Tie games were not officially counted in the standings in the AFL.

=== Roster ===
1964 Houston Oilers roster
Quarterbacks: 16 George Blanda K; 10 Don Trull; Running backs: 42 Sid Blanks; 25 Ode Burrell; 34 Dalton Hoffman; 44 Charley Tolar; Wide receivers: 28 Charley Frazier; 87 Charley Hennigan; Tight ends: 88 Willard Dewveall; 83 Willie Frazier; 81 Bob McLeod	Offensive linemen: 66 Sonny Bishop T; 55 John Frongillo G/C; 68 Tom Goode C; 72 Jack Klotz T; 76 Walter Suggs T; 61 Bob Talamini G; 67 John Wittenborn G; Defensive linemen: 70 Scott Appleton DE; 80 Gary Cutsinger DE; 75 Don Floyd DE; 82 Ed Husmann DT; 64 Bud McFadin DT	Linebackers: 84 Johnny Baker OLB; 85 Danny Brabham OLB; 31 Doug Cline OLB/MLB; 52 Sammy Odom MLB; 30 Charlie Rieves OLB; Defensive backs: 27 Fred Glick FS; 33 W. K. Hicks CB; 47 Pete Jaquess CB; 22 Benny Nelson SS; 43 Jim Norton SS/P; 23 Bobby Jancik CB	Reserve lists: 40 Tony Banfield CB (IR); -- Ed Burke DE (IR); -- Ken Chancelor LB (IR); 89 Dobie Craig WR (IR); -- Bob Crenshaw G (IR); -- Jim Herron RB (IR); 73 Bob Kelly T (IR); 77 Rich Michael T (IR); 45 Larry Onesti LB (IR); 32 Dave Smith RB (IR); rookies in italics
