= 1964 Denver Broncos season =

American football team season

- General manager: Jack Faulkner
- Head coach: Jack Faulkner; Mac Speedie
- Home stadium: Bears Stadium

Results
- Record: 2–11–1
- Division place: 4th AFL Western
- Playoffs: Did not qualify

The 1964 Denver Broncos season was the fifth season for the team in the American Football League (AFL). For the second straight season, they finished with a record of two wins, eleven losses, and one tie, and finished last in the AFL's Western Division.

In March 1964, the Chicago Sun-Times reported that then Chicago White Sox owner Arthur Allyn, Jr. planned to purchase the Broncos and move the franchise to Chicago where they would play at Comiskey Park. Both Allyn and Broncos president Cal Kunz denied the deal and the Broncos remained in Denver.

== Personnel ==
=== Staff ===
1964 Denver Broncos staff
Front office: Owner / Chairman of the Board – Gerald Phipps; Team President – Calvin W Kunz Jr; Vice President – Earl R Howsam; Head coaches: General Manager/Head Coach – Jack Faulkner; Offensive coaches: Offensive Backfield/Director of Player Personnel – Bill Meek; Offensive Ends – Mac Speedie (interim Head Coach); Offensive Line – Red Miller	Defensive coaches: Defensive Line – Ray Malavasi; Defensive Backfield – George Dickson

=== Roster ===
1964 Denver Broncos roster
Quarterbacks (QB): 15 Jacky Lee; 7 Mickey Slaughter; Running backs (RB): 3 Billy Joe; 27 Charlie Mitchell; 34 Donnie Stone; Wide receivers (WR): 42 Odell Barry; 88 Al Denson; 82 Bob Scarpitto; 87 Lionel Taylor; Tight ends (TE): 30 Hewritt Dixon; 84 Matt Snorton	Offensive linemen (OL): 62 Ernie Barnes G; 75 Eldon Danenhauer T; 52 Ray Kubala C; 67 Bob McCullough G; 76 Harold Olson T; 71 Jim Perkins T; 65 Don Shackelford G; 72 Jerry Sturm C; Defensive linemen (DL): 74 Frank Atkinson DT; 80 Ed Cooke DE; 86 Stan Fanning DE; 77 Dick Guesman K/DT; 83 Ray Jacobs DT; 70 Charlie Janerette DT; 73 Ike Lassiter DE; 78 Leroy Moore DE	Linebackers (LB): 51 Jim Fraser OLB/P; 50 Jerry Hopkins OLB/MLB; 54 Larry Jordan OLB; 55 Marv Matuszak MLB; 56 Jim Price OLB; Defensive backs (DB): 28 Billy Atkins SS; 24 Willie Brown CB; 23 Goose Gonsoulin FS; 46 John Griffin CB; 26 Tom Janik FS/SS/P; 47 John McGeever SS; 45 Jim McMillin CB; 41 Jim Wright FS; Special teams (ST)	Reserve: 53 Tom Erlandson LB (IR); 18 John McCormick QB (IR); 68 Tom Nomina G (IR); Rookies in italics

== Regular season ==
Week	Date	Opponent	Result	Record	Venue	Attendance	Recap
1	September 12	at New York Jets	**L** 6–30	0–1	Shea Stadium	45,665	Recap
2	September 20	at Buffalo Bills	**L** 13–30	0–2	War Memorial Stadium	28,501	Recap
3	September 27	Houston Oilers	**L** 17–38	0–3	Bears Stadium	22,651	Recap
4	October 4	Boston Patriots	**L** 10–39	0–4	Bears Stadium	15,485	Recap
5	October 11	**Kansas City Chiefs**	**W** 33–27	1–4	Bears Stadium	16,285	Recap
6	October 18	at **San Diego Chargers**	**L** 14–42	1–5	Balboa Stadium	23,332	Recap
7	October 25	at **Oakland Raiders**	**L** 7–40	1–6	Frank Youell Field	17,858	Recap
8	November 1	at **Kansas City Chiefs**	**L** 39–49	1–7	Municipal Stadium	15,053	Recap
9	November 8	**San Diego Chargers**	**L** 20–31	1–8	Bears Stadium	19,670	Recap
10	November 15	New York Jets	**W** 20–16	2–8	Bears Stadium	11,309	Recap
11	November 20	at Boston Patriots	**L** 7–12	2–9	Fenway Park	24,979	Recap
12	November 29	**Oakland Raiders**	**T** 20–20	2–9–1	Bears Stadium	15,958	Recap
13	Bye						
14	December 13	Buffalo Bills	**L** 19–30	2–10–1	Bears Stadium	14,431	Recap
15	December 20	at Houston Oilers	**L** 15–34	2–11–1	Jeppesen Stadium	15,839	Recap
Note: Intra-division opponents are in **bold** text.

== Standings ==
AFL Western Division
	W	L	T	PCT	DIV	PF	PA	STK
San Diego Chargers	8	5	1	.615	4–2	341	300	L2
Kansas City Chiefs	7	7	0	.500	4–2	366	306	W2
Oakland Raiders	5	7	2	.417	2–3–1	303	350	W2
Denver Broncos	2	11	1	.154	1–4–1	240	438	L2

Note: Tie games were not officially counted in the standings in the AFL.
