= 1964 Boston Patriots season =

Season of American Football League team the Boston Patriots

- Owner: Billy Sullivan
- Head coach: Mike Holovak
- Home stadium: Fenway Park

Results
- Record: 10–3–1
- Division place: 2nd AFL Eastern
- Playoffs: Did not qualify
- AFL All-Stars: LB Tom Addison; DT Houston Antwine; LB Nick Buoniconti; WR/K Gino Cappelletti; DE Bob Dee; DE Larry Eisenhauer; RB Larry Garron; C Jon Morris; QB Babe Parilli

Uniform

The 1964 Boston Patriots season was the franchise's fifth season in the American Football League. The Patriots ended the season with a record of ten wins, three losses, and one tie, and finished second in the AFL's Eastern Division.

The 43–43 tie vs the Oakland Raiders October 16 is still the highest scoring draw in professional football history.

== Staff ==
1964 Boston Patriots staff
Front office: President – Billy Sullivan; Head coaches: Head Coach – Mike Holovak; Offensive coaches: Offensive Line – Art Spinney	Defensive coaches: Defensive Line/Defensive Backfield – Chuck Weber; Defensive Backs – Carl Taseff

== Game-by-game results ==
Week	Date	Opponent	Result	Record	Venue	Attendance	Game Recap
1	September 13	at Oakland Raiders	**W** 17–14	1–0	Frank Youell Field	21,126	Recap
2	September 20	at San Diego Chargers	**W** 33–28	2–0	Balboa Stadium	20,568	Recap
3	September 27	**New York Jets**	**W** 26–10	3–0	Alumni Stadium	22,716	Recap
4	October 4	at Denver Broncos	**W** 39–10	4–0	Bears Stadium	15,485	Recap
5	October 9	San Diego Chargers	**L** 17–26	4–1	Fenway Park	35,096	Recap
6	October 16	Oakland Raiders	**T** 43–43	4–1–1	Fenway Park	23,279	Recap
7	October 23	Kansas City Chiefs	**W** 24–7	5–1–1	Fenway Park	27,400	Recap
8	October 31	at **New York Jets**	**L** 14–35	5–2–1	Shea Stadium	45,003	Recap
9	November 6	**Houston Oilers**	**W** 25–24	6–2–1	Fenway Park	28,161	Recap
10	November 15	at **Buffalo Bills**	**W** 36–28	7–2–1	War Memorial Stadium	42,308	Recap
11	November 20	Denver Broncos	**W** 12–7	8–2–1	Fenway Park	24,979	Recap
12	November 29	at **Houston Oilers**	**W** 34–17	9–2–1	Jeppesen Stadium	17,560	Recap
13	December 6	at Kansas City Chiefs	**W** 31–24	10–2–1	Municipal Stadium	13,166	Recap
14	Bye						
15	December 20	**Buffalo Bills**	**L** 14–24	10–3–1	Fenway Park	38,021	Recap
Note: Intra-division opponents are in **bold** text.

== Standings ==
AFL Eastern Division
	W	L	T	PCT	DIV	PF	PA	STK
Buffalo Bills	12	2	0	.857	5–1	400	242	W2
Boston Patriots	10	3	1	.769	4–2	365	297	L1
New York Jets	5	8	1	.385	2–4	278	315	L3
Houston Oilers	4	10	0	.286	1–5	310	355	W2

Note: Tie games were not officially counted in the standings in the AFL.

== Roster ==
Boston Patriots 1964 roster
Quarterbacks: 15 Babe Parilli; 14 Tom Yewcic P; Running backs: 22 Ron Burton; 32 J.D. Garrett; 40 Larry Garron; Wide receivers: 20 Gino Cappelletti K; 81 Jim Colclough; 84 Art Graham; Tight ends: 86 Tony Romeo; 45 Thomas Stephens	Offensive linemen: 70 Jerry DeLucca T; 76 Charlie Long G; 56 Jon Morris C; 73 Billy Neighbors G; 77 Don Oakes T; 74 Bob Schmidt T; 67 Dave Watson G; Defensive linemen: 65 Houston Antwine DT; 72 Larry Eisenhauer DE; 89 Bob Dee DE; 79 Jim Lee Hunt DT; 75 Jess Richardson DT; 60 Len St. Jean DT/DE	Linebackers: 53 Tom Addison OLB; 85 Nick Buoniconti MLB; 54 Mike Dukes OLB; 55 Lonnie Farmer OLB; 51 Don McKinnon MLB; 80 Jack Rudolph OLB; Defensive backs: 28 Dave Cloutier FS; 23 Ron Hall FS; 25 Ross O'Hanley SS; 34 Chuck Shonta CB; 42 Don Webb CB	Reserve list: 30 Jim Crawford RB (IR); 24 Dick Felt CB (IR); 21 Bob Suci CB (IR); 50 Bob Yates T (IR)
