= Jerry Mays (defensive lineman) =

American football player (1939–1994)

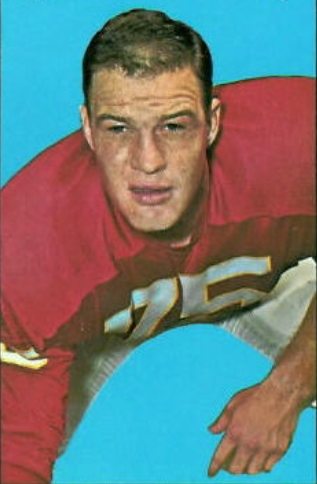
- Mays on a 1965 Topps card

No. 75
- Positions: Defensive end, defensive tackle

Personal information
- Born: November 24, 1939; Dallas, Texas, U.S.
- Died: July 17, 1994 (aged 54); Lake Lewisville, Texas, U.S.
- Listed height: 6 ft 4 in (1.93 m)
- Listed weight: 252 lb (114 kg)

Career information
- High school: Sunset
- College: SMU
- NFL draft: 1961: 11th round, 141st overall pick
- AFL draft: 1961: 5th round, 38th overall pick

Career history
- Dallas Texans/Kansas City Chiefs (1961–1970)

Awards and highlights
- Super Bowl champion (IV); 6× AFL All-Star (1962, 1964–1968); 2× First-team All-AFL (1965, 1966); 6× Second-team All-AFL (1962–1964, 1967–1969); Pro Bowl (1970); 3× AFL champion (1962, 1966, 1969); AFL All-Time Team; Kansas City Chiefs Hall of Fame; First-team All-SWC (1960)

Career NFL/AFL statistics
- Fumble recoveries: 2
- Interceptions: 1
- Sacks: 65.5
- Stats at Pro Football Reference

Gerald Avery "Jerry" Mays (November 24, 1939 – July 17, 1994) was an American professional football player who was a defensive tackle and defensive end for 10 years with the Dallas Texans/Kansas City Chiefs. He played in the American Football League (AFL) for his first nine years, before playing his final season (1970) in the National Football League (NFL) after the AFL-NFL merger. Mays was an AFL All-Star and All-AFL selection on multiple occasions, and was named by the Pro Football Hall of Fame to the AFL's All-Time Team. Mays played on three AFL championships teams. He played in Super Bowls I and IV. He played college football for the SMU Mustangs, and was a first-team All-Southwest Conference selection his senior year, even though his team was winless that season.

== Early life ==
Mays was born on November 24, 1939, in Dallas, Texas to Avery Mays and Eva Blanche (Ponder) Mays. Avery was a builder and real estate developer in Dallas and served as a Dallas Chamber of Commerce president and on the board of Lone Star Gas Company, among many other public and private leadership positions. Avery Mays also unsuccessfully ran for mayor of Dallas. Mays had one older sister, Joyce (Mays) Thompson a public school teacher in Dallas. Mays started working for his father at nine years old. Growing up he worked after school and during the summers cleaning up construction sites for his father's company, Mays Construction Co.

Mays attended Sunset High School in Dallas. At Sunset, Mays was student body president, senior class president, a Lt. Governor of Texas' Boys State, and a member of the National Honor Society. He played on the football team, where he was an All-State lineman in 1956. He was captain of the football team. Mays led Sunset to the Sanger Trophy, awarded to the Dallas high school football team having the best record. Mays also threw the shot put on Sunset's track and field team, and came in second in a statewide track meet in the shot put.

== College career ==
Mays attended Southern Methodist University (SMU) in Dallas, where he served as co-captain for the Mustangs and earned Associated Press (AP) first-team All-Southwest Conference honors at defensive tackle in 1960, alongside future Pro Football Hall of Fame tackle Bob Lilly of Texas Christian University. Mays was selected to the All-Southwest Conference team his senior year despite SMU failing to win a single game during the season; and was the only SMU player who was named to the first or second team. One of his college teammates was future NFL quarterback and television commentator Don Meredith. Mays played in the East West Shrine Game.

Mays was a straight-A student, graduating with honors, while earning a Bachelor of Science degree in civil engineering. He graduated with the highest grades among the civil engineering students at SMU. He was a member of the Blue Key Honor Society, an honor given to students for their all-around excellence in scholarship, leadership, and service. He was twice named an Academic All-American and received the Earl Blaik National Scholar Athlete award.

== Professional career ==
The American Football League's (AFL) Dallas Texans drafted Mays in the fifth round of the 1961 AFL draft (38th overall). The National Football League's (NFL) Minnesota Vikings drafted him in the 11th round of the 1961 NFL draft (141st overall). The Texans signed Mays in mid-January 1961. Mays turned down the Vikings in order to play near his home in Dallas. In addition, the Vikings were an expansion team entering their first year of existence when they drafted Mays; and the Texans, although only one-year old themselves, had been 8–6 in their 1960 inaugural season.

In 1961, Mays started four games as a rookie, playing on the defensive line as an end and tackle under future Hall of Fame head coach Hank Stram (who would be Mays's only head coach during his entire career). In 1962, he became a full-time starter on the Chiefs' defensive line at right defensive tackle. Stram believed Mays had the quickness, speed, size and strength to excel at defensive tackle or end; and combined determination and a joy for the game with his natural abilities. Quarterback sacks did not become an official statistic in the NFL until 1982. Mays is unofficially credited with 4.5 sacks in 1962.

The Sporting News named Mays All-AFL first team in 1962, and the Associated Press (AP) and United Press International (UPI) named him second-team All-AFL. He was also selected to the West Division All-Star Team at defensive tackle. The Texans won the AFL's West Division and defeated the Houston Oilers in the 1962 AFL Championship game in double overtime, 20–17, with Mays starting at right defensive tackle.

Texans' owner Lamar Hunt moved the team to Kansas City before the start of the 1963 season, where they became the Kansas City Chiefs. Mays started 10 games at right tackle in 1963. He returned a fumble 58 yards for a touchdown in the last game of the season, and was awarded the game ball by his teammates. In 1963, he was voted second-team All-AFL by the AP, UPI and Newspaper Enterprise Association (NEA). Stram first made Mays the Chiefs defensive captain in 1963.

Before the 1964 season Mays considered retiring if he could not play for the Dallas Cowboys, because of the hardship on his young family spending time in both Kansas City and Dallas during the year. However, he remained with the Chiefs. Mays was again the Chiefs' defensive co-captain for the 1964 season, a position Stram continued to bestow on Mays over the remainder of his career.

Mays moved to left defensive tackle in 1964, playing between future Hall of Famers Bobby Bell (left defensive end) and Buck Buchanan (right defensive tackle). Bell and Buchanan are considered two of the top 100 players in AFL/NFL history. He had five sacks on the season. Mays was once again selected to play in the AFL All-Star Game. The Sporting News named him first-team All-AFL, and the AP and NEA named him second-team All-AFL.

In 1965, Stram moved Mays to left defensive end, where he would play for the rest of his career. Mays had nine sacks at his new position. He was named first-team All-AFL by The Sporting News, AP and NEA and second-team by UPI. He was selected to play in the AFL All-Star Game again. In 1966, the Chiefs once again won the AFL championship, 31–7 over the Buffalo Bills, with Mays having a sack in the championship game. The Chiefs then competed in the first Super Bowl against the Green Bay Packers, losing 35–10. Mays had 5.5 sacks on the season. He was again selected first-team All-AFL by The Sporting News, AP and NEA, as well as by UPI. He was also selected to play in the AFL All-Star Game.

In 1967, Mays had two fumble recoveries and 6.5 sacks. He had his best two years in sacks in 1968 and 1969, with 10.5 and 11, respectively. He was selected to the AFL Western Division All-Star squad in 1967 and 1968. The AP named him second-team All-AFL from 1967 to 1969, and The Sporting News named him first-team All-AFL in 1967 and 1968, and second-team All-AFL in 1969.

The Chiefs won the final AFL championship in 1969. The Chiefs' defensive line that season consisted of Mays at left end, Hall of Fame tackles Curley Culp (left tackle) and Buck Buchanan (right tackle), and right end Aaron Brown. They have been rated among the top 10 defensive lines in AFL/NFL history. The defense also included, among others, Hall of Famers Bobby Bell (left linebacker), Willie Lanier (middle linebacker), Emmitt Thomas (right cornerback) and Johnny Robinson (free safety). In 1969, the Chiefs' defense led the AFL by allowing only 177 points in 14 games, with the next lowest team allowing 242 points. They also led the AFL in fewest total yards (3,163), fewest passing yards (2,072) and fewest running yards allowed (1,091).

The Chiefs defeated the New York Jets in the divisional round of the 1969 playoffs, 13–6; with Mays having .5 sacks in that game. They next defeated the Oakland Raiders in the 1969 AFL Championship Game, 17–7, with Mays having one quarterback sack. The Chiefs then defeated the Minnesota Vikings 23–7 in Super Bowl IV. During the game, Mays sacked Vikings' quarterback Joe Kapp for a six yard loss, and tackled Bill Brown for a one-yard loss on a pass reception. The Chiefs were playing in the final competitive team game in AFL history, and wore a patch commemorating its unique history as a distinct league.

After defeating the Vikings, Mays said "'I told some of the younger guys on the team I felt sorry for them because they hadn't had that horrible experience of losing to the Packers in the first Super Bowl, as the older guys did. They would have enjoyed this so much more. We were knocked in the past, humiliated, in a way, and more than once had to bite our tongues. So there was a lot of extra satisfaction today. And what meant more to me than the money was this AFL patch on my shoulder'".

The final game in independent AFL history was the AFL All-Star game, which took place six days after the Super Bowl, on January 17, 1970. Mays did not play in the game. Two days before that last AFL game, he was among those presented with plaques for being named to the AFL's All-Time team.

The AFL and NFL fully merged before the 1970 season into one 26-team league (the NFL). Mays played one year for the Chiefs in the NFL before retiring. He was selected to play in the Pro Bowl for the American Football Conference (AFC), and was chosen by his AFC teammates as one of the AFC's co-captains. UPI also named him second-team All-AFC for the 1970 season. Mays announced his retirement in April 1971, stating he felt compelled to help run his father's construction business in Dallas.

== Legacy and honors ==
Mays chose to play professional football, even though he could have made more money working in his father's construction and real estate development business. His teammates would at times even tease him about his family's wealth. But he loved playing football and realized how rare an opportunity it was to be able to play at the professional level. Coach Hank Stram said Mays's secret to success in life was "'Jerry's accelerator is stuck at 100 per cent effort'".

Mays retired having never missed a game during his 10-year career (140 regular season games, four AFL playoff games and two Super Bowls). He had 65.5 career sacks, playing tackle and end. He was first- or second-team All-AFL from 1962 to 1969. Mays played in six AFL All-Star Games and one AFC-NFC Pro Bowl, at two different positions. His contribution to the Chiefs' strong defense helped them defeat the Vikings, 23–7, in Super Bowl IV. He was the Chiefs' defensive captain in Super Bowl I and Super Bowl IV. Mays started 126 regular season games for the Texans/Chiefs. From 1964 to 1970, Mays started every Chiefs' game. He played in 126 straight games for the AFL Texans and the Chiefs.

Mays was named to the All-time All-AFL Team in 1970 by the Pro Football Hall of Fame. In 1972, Mays was inducted into the Kansas City Chiefs Hall of Honor; only the third player so honored at the time. In 1987, Chiefs' fans voted Mays to the Chiefs 25th anniversary all-time team. Mays is a member of the 2012 class of the Sunset High School Hall of Fame.

== Personal life and death ==
In August 1956, Mays married his wife, Jo Ann Clark, while they were high school juniors or seniors. In college, Mays observed it was generally not good to marry so young, but they had been very happy. They had three children by his second year in the NFL. Mays worked for his father's construction business in the offseasons, and once oversaw the construction of an addition to Sunset High School. In 1969 and 1970, he was a vice-president of Avery Mays Construction Company in the offseason. After retiring, Mays returned to Dallas to work for Mays Construction. Mays became company president in 1971. Mays also became a partner in an insurance agency in Dallas.

He was active in charitable works for, among others, the American Red Cross and the Cystic Fibrosis Foundation in Kansas City, and the March of Dimes in Dallas. During his career, he was active in the Fellowship of Christian Athletes (FCA). He was first motivated to join the FCA after hearing the Detroit Lions' Hall of Fame player Doak Walker speak at Sunset High School when Mays was a senior. Mays himself began his long career as a public speaker to church and civic groups while at SMU.

He died of melanoma on July 17, 1994, survived by his wife and their seven children. Mays died two years after the death (from cancer) of his former teammate, Buck Buchanan. The other starting defensive end from the Super Bowl IV team, Aaron Brown, was killed in 1997 when struck by a car from behind, leaving Curley Culp as the lone survivor of the Chiefs' vaunted front four from the championship club up until Culp's death in November 2021.

== See also ==
- List of American Football League players
