= 1964 Buffalo Bills season =

5th season in franchise history, first league championship

- Owner: Ralph Wilson
- Head coach: Lou Saban
- Home stadium: War Memorial Stadium

Results
- Record: 12–2
- Division place: 1st AFL Eastern
- Playoffs: Won AFL Championship (vs. Chargers) 20–7

The 1964 Buffalo Bills season was the team’s fifth season. Buffalo was 12–2 in the regular season and won the first of two consecutive championships in the American Football League.

The 1964 Bills' defense set an AFL record by giving up the fewest rushing yards in league history, with only 918, or 65.5 yards per game. They also led the league in points allowed (242), total yards allowed (3,878), first downs surrendered (206), and rushing touchdowns allowed (four).

Buffalo's offense also led the AFL in total yards (5,206), passing yards (2,040) and total points (400).

== Regular season ==
=== Season schedule ===
| Game | Date | Opponent | Result | Record | Venue | Attendance | Recap | Sources |
|---|---|---|---|---|---|---|---|---|
| 1 | September 13 | Kansas City Chiefs | **W** 34–17 | 1–0 | War Memorial Stadium | 30,157 | Recap | |
| 2 | September 20 | Denver Broncos | **W** 30–13 | 2–0 | War Memorial Stadium | 28,501 | Recap | |
| 3 | September 26 | San Diego Chargers | **W** 30–3 | 3–0 | War Memorial Stadium | 40,167 | Recap | |
| 4 | October 3 | Oakland Raiders | **W** 23–20 | 4–0 | War Memorial Stadium | 36,461 | Recap | |
| 5 | October 11 | at **Houston Oilers** | **W** 48–17 | 5–0 | Jeppesen Stadium | 26,218 | Recap | |
| 6 | October 18 | at Kansas City Chiefs | **W** 35–22 | 6–0 | Municipal Stadium | 20,904 | Recap | |
| 7 | October 24 | **New York Jets** | **W** 34–24 | 7–0 | War Memorial Stadium | 39,621 | Recap | |
| 8 | November 1 | **Houston Oilers** | **W** 24–10 | 8–0 | War Memorial Stadium | 40,119 | Recap | |
| 9 | November 8 | at **New York Jets** | **W** 20–7 | 9–0 | Shea Stadium | 61,929 | Recap | |
| 10 | November 15 | **Boston Patriots** | **L** 28–36 | 9–1 | War Memorial Stadium | 42,308 | Recap | |
| — | Bye | | | | | | | |
| 11 | November 26 | at San Diego Chargers | **W** 27–24 | 10–1 | Balboa Stadium | 34,865 | Recap | |
| 12 | December 6 | at Oakland Raiders | **L** 13–16 | 10–2 | Frank Youell Field | 18,134 | Recap | |
| 13 | December 13 | at Denver Broncos | **W** 30–19 | 11–2 | Bears Stadium | 14,431 | Recap | |
| 14 | December 20 | at **Boston Patriots** | **W** 24–14 | 12–2 | Fenway Park | 38,021 | Recap | |
Note: Intra-division opponents are in **bold** text.

=== Game summaries ===
==== Week 1 ====
| Team | 1 | 2 | 3 | 4 | Total |
|---|---|---|---|---|---|
| Chiefs | 0 | 3 | 14 | 0 | 17 |
| • Bills | 31 | 0 | 0 | 3 | 34 |

- Date: September 13
- Location: War Memorial Stadium, Buffalo, NY
- Game attendance: 30,157
- Game weather: 51 °F (11 °C); wind 6 mph

Scoring summary
| Q1 | BUF | Gogolak 13 yard field goal | BUF 3–0 |
| Q1 | BUF | Bass 10 yard pass from Kemp (Gogolak kick) | BUF 10–0 |
| Q1 | BUF | Dubenion 6 yard pass from Kemp (Gogolak kick) | BUF 17–0 |
| Q1 | BUF | Bass 17 yard pass from Kemp (Gogolak kick) | BUF 24–0 |
| Q1 | BUF | Sestak 15 yard interception return (Gogolak kick) | BUF 31–0 |
| Q2 | KC | Brooker 12 yard field goal | BUF 31–3 |
| Q3 | KC | Arbanas 5 yard pass from Dawson (Brooker kick) | BUF 31–10 |
| Q3 | KC | Haynes 44 yard pass from Dawson (Brooker kick) | BUF 31–17 |
| Q4 | BUF | Gogolak 13 yard field goal | BUF 34–17 |

==== Week 2 ====
| Team | 1 | 2 | 3 | 4 | Total |
|---|---|---|---|---|---|
| Broncos | 3 | 7 | 3 | 0 | 13 |
| • Bills | 3 | 10 | 7 | 10 | 30 |

- Date: September 20
- Location: War Memorial Stadium, Buffalo, NY
- Game attendance: 28,501
- Game weather: 64 °F (18 °C); wind 11 mph

Scoring summary
| Q1 | DEN | Mingo 51 yard field goal | DEN 3–0 |
| Q1 | BUF | Gogolak 33 yard field goal | Tie 3–3 |
| Q2 | BUF | Gilchrist 15 yard run (Gogolak kick) | BUF 10–3 |
| Q2 | BUF | Gogolak 21 yard field goal | BUF 13–3 |
| Q2 | DEN | Taylor 46 yard pass from Lee (Mingo kick) | BUF 13–10 |
| Q3 | DEN | Mingo 49 yard field goal | Tie 13–13 |
| Q3 | BUF | Gilchrist 1 yard run (Gogolak kick) | BUF 20–13 |
| Q4 | BUF | Gogolak 17 yard field goal | BUF 23–13 |
| Q4 | BUF | Lamonica 8 yard run (Gogolak kick) | BUF 30–13 |

==== Week 3 ====
| Team | 1 | 2 | 3 | 4 | Total |
|---|---|---|---|---|---|
| Chargers | 0 | 3 | 0 | 0 | 3 |
| • Bills | 7 | 7 | 3 | 13 | 30 |

- Date: September 26
- Location: War Memorial Stadium, Buffalo, NY
- Game attendance: 40,167
- Game weather: 59 °F (15 °C); wind 13 mph

Scoring summary
| Q1 | BUF | Byrd 85 yard interception return (Gogolak kick) | BUF 7–0 |
| Q2 | SD | Blair 12 yard field goal | BUF 7–3 |
| Q2 | BUF | Clarke 53 yard punt return (Gogolak kick) | BUF 14–3 |
| Q3 | BUF | Gogolak 13 yard field goal | BUF 17–3 |
| Q4 | BUF | Auer 2 yard run (Gogolak kick) | BUF 24–3 |
| Q4 | BUF | Dubenion 40 yard pass from Lamonica (kick failed) | BUF 30–3 |

==== Week 4 ====
| Team | 1 | 2 | 3 | 4 | Total |
|---|---|---|---|---|---|
| Raiders | 3 | 0 | 7 | 10 | 20 |
| • Bills | 0 | 7 | 7 | 9 | 23 |

- Date: October 3
- Location: War Memorial Stadium, Buffalo, NY
- Game attendance: 36,461
- Game weather: 58°; wind 17 mph

Scoring summary
| Q1 | OAK | Mercer 25 yard field goal | OAK 3–0 |
| Q2 | BUF | Kemp 9 yard run (Gogolak kick) | BUF 7–3 |
| Q3 | OAK | Davidson 6 yard run (Mercer kick) | OAK 10–7 |
| Q3 | BUF | Lamonica 1 yard run (Gogolak kick) | BUF 14–10 |
| Q4 | OAK | Mercer 19 yard field goal | BUF 14–13 |
| Q4 | BUF | Dubenion 44 yard pass from Lamonica (Gogolak kick) | BUF 21–13 |
| Q4 | BUF | Safety, Davidson tackled by McDole in end zone | BUF 23–13 |
| Q4 | OAK | Herock 4 yard pass from Davdison (Mercer kick) | BUF 23–20 |

==== Week 5 ====
| Team | 1 | 2 | 3 | 4 | Total |
|---|---|---|---|---|---|
| • Bills | 14 | 17 | 17 | 10 | 58 |
| Oilers | 7 | 3 | 7 | 0 | 17 |

- Date: October 11
- Location: Jeppesen Stadium, Houston, TX
- Game weather: 61 °F (16 °C); wind 4 mph

Scoring summary
| Q1 | BUF | Gilchrist 1 yard run (Gogolak kick) | BUF 7–0 |
| Q1 | HOU | Blanks 4 yard run (Blanda kick) | Tie 7–7 |
| Q1 | BUF | Bass 9 yard pass from Kemp (Gogolak kick) | BUF 14–7 |
| Q2 | BUF | Dubenion 19 yard pass from Kemp (Gogolak kick) | BUF 21–7 |
| Q2 | HOU | Blanda 47 yard field goal | BUF 21–10 |
| Q2 | BUF | Bass 94 yard pass from Kemp (Gogolak kick) | BUF 28–10 |
| Q2 | BUF | Gogolak 18 yard field goal | BUF 31–10 |
| Q3 | HOU | Hennigan 53 yard pass from Blanda (Blanda kick) | BUF 31–17 |
| Q3 | BUF | Gilchirst 3 yard run (Gogolak kick) | BUF 38–17 |
| Q4 | BUF | Gogolak 26 yard field goal | BUF 41–17 |
| Q4 | BUF | Ross 1 yard run (Gogolak kick) | BUF 48–17 |

- Jack Kemp 14/26, 378 Yds
- Elbert Dubenion 5 Rec, 183 Yds
- Glenn Bass 5 Rec, 147 Yds

== Standings ==
Program for the October 24 home game against the New York Jets.

AFL Eastern Division
| | W | L | T | PCT | DIV | PF | PA | STK |
|---|---|---|---|---|---|---|---|---|
| Buffalo Bills | 12 | 2 | 0 | .857 | 5–1 | 400 | 242 | W2 |
| Boston Patriots | 10 | 3 | 1 | .769 | 4–2 | 365 | 297 | L1 |
| New York Jets | 5 | 8 | 1 | .385 | 2–4 | 278 | 315 | L3 |
| Houston Oilers | 4 | 10 | 0 | .286 | 1–5 | 310 | 355 | W2 |

Note: Tie games were not officially counted in the standings in the AFL.

== Postseason ==
| Round | Date | Opponent | Result | Venue | Attendance | Recap |
|---|---|---|---|---|---|---|
| Championship | December 26 | San Diego Chargers | W 20–7 | 40,242 | War Memorial Stadium | Recap |

=== AFL Championship Game ===
| Team | 1 | 2 | 3 | 4 | Total |
|---|---|---|---|---|---|
| Chargers | 7 | 0 | 0 | 0 | 7 |
| • Bills | 3 | 10 | 0 | 7 | 20 |

- Date: December 26
- Location: War Memorial Stadium, Buffalo, New York
- Game attendance: 40,242
- Game weather: 43 °F (6 °C) • Wind 13 mph

Scoring summary
| 1 | SD | Dave Kocourek 26 yard pass from Tobin Rote (Keith Lincoln kick) | Chargers 7–0 |
| 1 | BUF | Pete Gogolak 12 yard field goal | Chargers 7–3 |
| 2 | BUF | Wray Carlton 4 yard run (Pete Gogolak kick) | Bills 10–7 |
| 2 | BUF | Pete Gogolak 17 yard field goal | Bills 13–7 |
| 4 | BUF | Jack Kemp 1 yard run (Pete Gogolak kick) | Bills 20–7 |

== Personnel ==
=== Staff ===
1964 Buffalo Bills staff
| Front office: President/team owner – Ralph Wilson; Vice-president/minority owner - Pat McGroder; Head coaches: Head coach – Lou Saban; Offensive coaches: Running backs/wide receivers – John Mazur; Offensive line – Jerry Smith | Defensive coaches: Linebackers/Defensive Backs – Joe Collier |

=== Roster ===
1964 Buffalo Bills roster
| Quarterbacks: 15 Jack Kemp; 12 Daryle Lamonica; Running backs: 30 Wray Carlton; 34 Cookie Gilchrist; 47 Willie Ross; 20 Bobby Smith; Wide receivers: 85 Glenn Bass; 44 Elbert Dubenion; 81 Bill Groman; 40 Ed Rutkowski; Tight ends: 84 Ernie Warlick | Offensive linemen: 77 Stew Barber T; 50 Al Bemiller G; 53 Walt Cudzik C; 73 George Flint G; 79 Dick Hudson T; 67 Joe O'Donnell G; 66 Billy Shaw G; Defensive linemen: 88 Tom Day DE; 78 Jim Dunaway DT; 75 Dudley Meredith DT; 72 Ron McDole DE; 70 Tom Sestak DT | Linebackers: 64 Harry Jacobs MLB; 55 Paul Maguire OLB/P; 58 Mike Stratton OLB; 51 John Tracey OLB; Defensive backs: 42 Butch Byrd CB; 45 Hagood Clarke SS; 25 Ollie Dobbins CB; 26 George Saimes FS; 23 Gene Sykes SS; 22 Charley Warner CB; Special teams: 3 Pete Gogolak K | Taxi squad: 43 Joe Auer RB; -- Bob Dugan T; 80 Charley Ferguson WR; -- Mailon Kent QB; Reserve list: 46 Ray Abruzzese S (IR); 51 Dave Behrman T/C (IR); 24 Booker Edgerson CB (IR); 74 Tom Keating DT (IR) |
Note: rookies in italics

== Player stats ==
=== Passing ===
| Player | Comp | Att | Yds | Completion % | TD | INT |
|---|---|---|---|---|---|---|
| Jack Kemp | 119 | 269 | 2285 | 44.2 | 13 | 26 |
| Daryle Lamonica | 55 | 128 | 1137 | 43.0 | 6 | 8 |

=== Rushing ===
| Player | Att | Yds | Average | Long | TD |
|---|---|---|---|---|---|
| Cookie Gilchrist | 230 | 981 | 4.3 | 67 | 6 |
| B. Smith | 62 | 306 | 4.9 | 37 | 4 |
| Daryle Lamonica | 55 | 289 | 5.3 | 18 | 6 |
| Joe Auer | 63 | 191 | 3.0 | 21 | 2 |
| Jack Kemp | 37 | 124 | 3.4 | 14 | 5 |
| Wray Carlton | 39 | 114 | 2.9 | 11 | 1 |

=== Special teams ===
==== Kicking ====
| Player | FG | Att | XP | XP Att | Pts |
|---|---|---|---|---|---|
| Pete Gogolak | 19 | 29 | 45 | 46 | 102 |

==== Punting ====
| Player | No. | Yards | Avg. | Long |
|---|---|---|---|---|
| Paul Maguire | 65 | 2777 | 42.7 | 64 |

== Awards and records ==
- Lou Saban, Coach of the Year

== See also ==
- List of American Football League players
