= 1964 New York Jets season =

1964 season of AFL team New York Jets

- Owner: Sonny Werblin
- Head coach: Weeb Ewbank
- Home stadium: Shea Stadium

Results
- Record: 5–8–1
- Division place: 3rd AFL East
- Playoffs: Did not qualify

The 1964 New York Jets season was the fifth season for the team in the American Football League (AFL). The season marked their first in Shea Stadium, after four seasons in the Polo Grounds. The season began with the team trying to improve on their 5–8–1 record from 1963 under head coach Weeb Ewbank. The Jets finished the season 5–8–1.

The Jets modified their helmet and logo design for 1964, switching from a single green stripe to two parallel green stripes down the center of the helmet crown. The jet-airplane logo decal was replaced by a white football shape outlined in green, with the word "JETS" in thick green sans-serif capitals over "NY" in green outline serif lettering, and a miniature football at bottom center.

Both the Jets and the baseball New York Mets moved to Shea in 1964. The team's original owner when it was the Titans, Harry Wismer, hoped the team could play in Shea beginning in 1961, but funding difficulties and legal problems delayed construction of the stadium. Wismer signed a memorandum of understanding in late 1961 to secure the Titans' new home. That memorandum recognized that the Mets would have exclusive use of the stadium until they had completed their season. As the Jets moved to Shea under new ownership, they were, in most years, required to open the season with several road games, a problem which would become worse in 1969 and 1973 when the Mets had long playoff runs.

The Jets' popularity had reached a zenith at this point, in that the attendance at any one of their home games this season (except for the game against Houston, and even that one wasn't by much) outdrew the Titans' entire 1962 season attendance at the Polo Grounds. The entire four-year stint at the Polo Grounds, in fact, had barely 40,000 attendees more than the entire 1964 season.

== Schedule ==
Game	Date	Opponent	Result	Record	Venue	Attendance	Recap	Sources
1	September 12	Denver Broncos	**W** 30–6	1–0	Shea Stadium	44,497	Recap	
—	Bye							
2	September 27	at **Boston Patriots**	**L** 10–26	1–1	Alumni Stadium	22,716	Recap	
3	October 3	San Diego Chargers	**T** 17–17	1–1–1	Shea Stadium	50,222	Recap	
4	October 10	Oakland Raiders	**W** 35–13	2–1–1	Shea Stadium	36,499	Recap	
5	October 17	**Houston Oilers**	**W** 24–21	3–1–1	Shea Stadium	35,816	Recap	
6	October 24	at **Buffalo Bills**	**L** 34–24	3–2–1	War Memorial Stadium	39,621	Recap	
7	October 31	**Boston Patriots**	**W** 35–14	4–2–1	Shea Stadium	45,033	Recap	
8	November 8	**Buffalo Bills**	**L** 7–20	4–3–1	Shea Stadium	61,929	Recap	
9	November 15	at Denver Broncos	**L** 16–20	4–4–1	Bears Stadium	11,309	Recap	
10	November 22	at Oakland Raiders	**L** 26–35	4–5–1	Frank Youell Field	15,589	Recap	
11	November 29	Kansas City Chiefs	**W** 27–14	5–5–1	Shea Stadium	46,597	Recap	
12	December 6	at San Diego Chargers	**L** 3–38	5–6–1	Balboa Stadium	25,753	Recap	
13	December 13	at **Houston Oilers**	**L** 17–33	5–7–1	Jeppesen Stadium	16,225	Recap	
14	December 20	at Kansas City Chiefs	**L** 7–24	5–8–1	Municipal Stadium	14,316	Recap	
Note: Intra-division opponents are in **bold** text.

== Game summaries ==
=== Week 1 ===
Team	1	2	3	4	Total
Broncos	3	0	0	3	6
• Jets	7	6	0	17	30

- Date: September 12
- Location: Shea Stadium, Flushing, New York
- Game attendance: 44,497
- Game weather: 68 °F (20 °C); wind 15 mph

Scoring summary
Q1	NYJ	Heeter 16 yard pass from Wood (Turner kick)	NYJ 7–0
Q1	DEN	Mingo 32 yard field goal	NYJ 7–3
Q2	NYJ	Turner 11 yard field goal	NYJ 10–3
Q2	NYJ	Turner 27 yard field goal	NYJ 13–3
Q4	DEN	Mingo 17 yard field goal	NYJ 13–6
Q4	NYJ	Turner 21 yard field goal	NYU 16–6
Q4	NYJ	Maynard 39 yard pass from Wood (Turner kick)	NYJ 23–6
Q4	NYJ	Snell 5 yard run (Turner kick)	NYJ 30–6

- Don Maynard 4 Rec, 101 Yds

== Standings ==
Program for the October 3 home game against the San Diego Chargers.

AFL Eastern Division
	W	L	T	PCT	DIV	PF	PA	STK
Buffalo Bills	12	2	0	.857	5–1	400	242	W2
Boston Patriots	10	3	1	.769	4–2	365	297	L1
New York Jets	5	8	1	.385	2–4	278	315	L3
Houston Oilers	4	10	0	.286	1–5	310	355	W2

Note: Tie games were not officially counted in the standings in the AFL.

== Roster ==
1964 New York Jets roster
Quarterbacks (QB): 17 Mike Taliaferro; 18 Pete Liske; Running backs (RB): 30 Mark Smolinski; 31 Bill Mathis; 33 Curley Johnson P; 41 Matt Snell; Wide receivers (WR): 13 Don Maynard; 29 Bake Turner; 80 Jim Evans; Tight ends (TE): 85 Gene Heeter; 89 Dee Mackey	Offensive linemen (OL): 61 Dan Ficca G; 64 Pete Perreault G/T; 65 Sam DeLuca LG; 67 Dave Herman C; 70 Jim McCusker T; 75 Winston Hill T; 79 Sherman Plunkett T; Defensive linemen (DL): 72 Paul Rochester DT; 74 Gordy Holz DT; 86 Bob Watters DE; 82 Bert Wilder DE; 87 LaVerne Torczon DE; 88 Bob McAdams DT	Linebackers (LB): 51 Ralph Baker OLB; 54 Wahoo McDaniel MLB; 60 Larry Grantham OLB; 62 Ed Cummings MLB; 63 Bob Rowley OLB; Defensive backs (DB): 23 Mark Johnston FS; 26 Bill Pashe CB; 40 Dainard Paulson SS; 46 Bill Baird CB; 83 Bill Rademacher FS; Special teams (ST): 11 Jim Turner K	Reserve: 52 Mike Hudock C (IR); 81 Gerry Philbin DE (IR); 56 John Schmitt C (IR); 25 Marshall Starks CB (IR); 43 Vince Turner CB (IR); 42 Clyde Washington CB (IR); 22 Willie West CB (IR); 19 Dick Wood QB (IR); Rookies in italics
