= 1983 Buffalo Bills season =

24th season in franchise history

- Owner: Ralph Wilson
- Head coach: Kay Stephenson
- Home stadium: Rich Stadium

Results
- Record: 8–8
- Division place: 2nd AFC East
- Playoffs: Did not qualify
- Pro Bowlers: RB Joe Cribbs; DT Fred Smerlas

The 1983 Buffalo Bills season was the franchise's 14th season in the National Football League, and the 24th overall. It was the first of three seasons for head coach Kay Stephenson. Bills running back Joe Cribbs was both the Bills' leading rusher (1,131 yards), and the team's leader in receptions and receiving yards (57 catches for 524 yards). The team looked to improve on its 4–5 record from 1982. With the NFL schedule back to 16 games, the Bills were a more competitive team during 1983. The team started 5–2 through its first 7 games. However, they would struggle the rest of the way, as they went 3–6 in its final 9 games en route to a mediocre 8–8 season. This season also saw the Bills beat the Dolphins in Miami for the first time since 1966, Miami's inaugural season. After beating the Chiefs, 14–9, at Arrowhead Stadium on December 4, the Bills would lose 22 road games in a row, which included going 0–8 on the road in each of the following two seasons.

== Offseason ==
=== NFL draft ===
The Bills drafted future Hall of Fame quarterback Jim Kelly, the third of a record six quarterbacks taken in the first round of the 1983 draft. Kelly received opposing offers from the United States Football League and from the Canadian Football League’s Montreal Concordes. Kelly would ultimately sign with the USFL’s Houston Gamblers for the following three seasons before making his first start with the Bills in Week One of the 1986 season. The Bills later retired Kelly's #12, at the time the only number the franchise retired. Linebacker Darryl Talley played for twelve years with the Bills. He was a two-time Pro Bowler, in 1990 and 1991. He was inducted into the Bills Wall of Fame.

1983 Buffalo Bills draft
Round	Pick	Player	Position	College	Notes
1	12	Tony Hunter	Tight end	Notre Dame	
1	14	Jim Kelly * ^{†}	Quarterback	Miami (FL)	Kelly would join the Bills for the 1986 season.
2	39	Darryl Talley *	Linebacker	West Virginia	
4	93	Trey Junkin	Linebacker	Louisiana Tech	
4	112	Jimmy Payne	Defensive end	Georgia	
5	126	Matt Vandenboom	Defensive back	Wisconsin	
7	180	Gurnest Brown	Defensive tackle	Maryland	
8	207	James Durham	Defensive back	Houston	
9	234	George Parker	Running back	Norfolk State	
10	260	Richard Tharpe	Defensive tackle	Louisville	
11	293	Larry White	Defensive end	Jackson State	
12	320	Julius Dawkins	Wide receiver	Pittsburgh	
Made roster † Pro Football Hall of Fame * Made at least one Pro Bowl during career

== Personnel ==
=== Staff ===
1983 Buffalo Bills staff
Front office: President – Ralph Wilson; Senior Executive Vice President – Pat McGroder; Vice President of Football Operations – Kay Stephenson; Vice President of Player Personnel – Norm Pollom; Head coaches: Head Coach – Kay Stephenson; Offensive coaches: Running Backs – Andy MacDonald; Receivers – Milt Jackson; Tight Ends – Al Sandahl; Offensive Line – Jim Niblack; Offensive Assistant – Perry Moss	Defensive coaches: Defensive Coordinator/Linebackers – Bob Zeman; Defensive Line – Don Lawrence; Defensive Backfield – Jerry Glanville; Defensive Assistant – Miller McCalmon; Special teams coaches: Special Teams – Miller McCalmon

=== Roster ===
1983 Buffalo Bills roster
Quarterbacks (QB): 11 Joe Dufek; 12 Joe Ferguson; 10 Matt Kofler; Running backs (RB): 20 Joe Cribbs; 48 Roosevelt Leaks; 34 Booker Moore; 40 Robb Riddick; 23 Van Williams; Wide receivers (WR): 89 Julius Dawkins; 85 Byron Franklin; 82 Frank Lewis; 81 Perry Tuttle; Tight ends (TE): 84 Buster Barnett; 86 Mark Brammer; 47 Tony Hunter	Offensive linemen (OL): 73 Jon Borchardt G; 67 Darryl Caldwell T/G; 63 Justin Cross T; 53 Will Grant C; 72 Ken Jones T; 61 Tom Lynch T; 51 Jim Ritcher G; 65 Tim Vogler C/G; Defensive linemen (DL): 75 Bill Acker NT; 90 Scott Hutchinson DE; 91 Ken Johnson DE; 76 Fred Smerlas NT; 93 Scott Virkus DE; 77 Ben Williams DE	Linebackers (LB): 55 Jim Haslett ILB; 50 Trey Junkin OLB; 52 Chris Keating ILB; 59 Joey Lumpkin ILB; 54 Eugene Marve ILB; 58 Mark Merrill ILB; 62 Ervin Parker OLB; 56 Darryl Talley OLB; 57 Lucius Sanford OLB; Defensive backs (DB): 29 Mario Clark CB; 28 Judson Flint SS; 22 Steve Freeman FS; 47 Bill Hurley SS; 21 Mike Kennedy SS; 43 David Kilson CB; 26 Charles Romes CB; 24 Gary Thompson CB; 27 Chris Williams FS; Special teams (ST): 7 Greg Cater P; 19 Joe Danelo K	Reserve: 80 Jerry Butler WR (IR); 70 Joe Devlin T (IR); -- Tom Gilmartin NT (IR); 87 Robert Holt WR (IR); 25 Roland Hooks RB (IR); 42 Rod Kush S (IR); 88 Mike Mosley WR (IR); 38 Jeff Nixon S (PUP); 74 Jimmy Payne DE (IR); 99 Mark Roopenian NT (IR); 79 Roger Taylor T (IR); 39 Matt Vandenboom S (IR); 41 Phil Villapiano LB (IR); 45 Len Walterscheid S (IR); 83 Sherman White DE (IR); Rookies in italics

== Schedule ==
Week	Date	Opponent	Result	Record	Venue	Attendance
1	September 4	**Miami Dolphins**	**L** 0–12	0–1	Rich Stadium	78,715
2	September 11	at Cincinnati Bengals	**W** 10–6	1–1	Riverfront Stadium	46,839
3	September 18	**Baltimore Colts**	**W** 28–23	2–1	Rich Stadium	40,937
4	September 25	Houston Oilers	**W** 30–13	3–1	Rich Stadium	60,070
5	October 3	**New York Jets**	**L** 10–34	3–2	Rich Stadium	79,933
6	October 9	**at Miami Dolphins**	**W** 38–35	4–2	Miami Orange Bowl	59,948
7	October 16	**at Baltimore Colts**	**W** 30–7	5–2	Memorial Stadium	38,565
8	October 23	**New England Patriots**	**L** 0–31	5–3	Rich Stadium	60,424
9	October 30	New Orleans Saints	**W** 27–21	6–3	Rich Stadium	49,413
10	November 6	at **New England Patriots**	**L** 7–21	6–4	Sullivan Stadium	42,604
11	November 13	at **New York Jets**	**W** 24–17	7–4	Shea Stadium	48,513
12	November 20	Los Angeles Raiders	**L** 24–27	7–5	Rich Stadium	72,393
13	November 27	at Los Angeles Rams	**L** 17–41	7–6	Anaheim Stadium	48,246
14	December 4	at Kansas City Chiefs	**W** 14–9	8–6	Arrowhead Stadium	27,104
15	December 11	San Francisco 49ers	**L** 10–23	8–7	Rich Stadium	38,039
16	December 18	at Atlanta Falcons	**L** 14–31	8–8	Atlanta–Fulton County Stadium	31,015
Note: Intra-division opponents are in **bold** text.

== Season summary ==
=== Week 1 ===
Team	1	2	3	4	Total
• Dolphins	0	6	3	3	12
Bills	0	0	0	0	0

- Date: September 4
- Location: Rich Stadium
- Game start: 1:00 PM EST
- Game attendance: 78,715
- Game weather: 72 °F (22.2 °C) • 12 miles per hour (19 km/h; 10 kn)
- Referee: Jim Tunney
- TV announcers (NBC): Charlie Jones and Bob Griese

=== Week 2 ===
Team	1	2	3	4	Total
• Bills	0	3	7	0	10
Bengals	0	3	0	3	6

- Date: September 11
- Location: Riverfront Stadium
- Referee: Gordon McCarter

=== Week 3 ===
Team	1	2	3	4	Total
Colts	6	3	7	7	23
• Bills	0	7	7	14	28

- Date: September 18
- Location: Rich Stadium
- Referee: Pat Haggerty

=== Week 4 ===
Team	1	2	3	4	Total
Oilers	3	3	7	0	13
• Bills	7	6	3	14	30

- Date: September 25
- Location: Rich Stadium
- Referee: Chuck Heberling

=== Week 5 ===
Team	1	2	3	4	Total
• Jets	0	7	10	17	34
Bills	0	0	0	10	10

- Date: October 5
- Location: Rich Stadium
- Referee: Jerry Markbreit
- TV announcers (ABC): Frank Gifford, Howard Cosell, OJ Simpson

=== Week 6 ===
Dan Marino first start in NFL

Team	1	2	3	4	OT	Total
• Bills	7	7	7	14	3	38
Dolphins	0	7	14	14	0	35

- Date: October 9
- Location: Orange Bowl
- Game start: 1:00 PM EST
- Game attendance: 59,948
- Game weather: 79 °F (26.1 °C) • 9 miles per hour (14 km/h; 7.8 kn)
- Referee: Fred Silva
- TV announcers (NBC): Charlie Jones and Bob Griese

=== Week 7 ===
Team	1	2	3	4	Total
• Bills	7	17	3	3	30
Colts	7	0	0	0	7

- Date: October 16
- Location: Memorial Stadium
- Referee: Bob Frederic

=== Week 8 ===
Team	1	2	3	4	Total
• Patriots	0	7	0	24	31
Bills	0	0	0	0	0

- Date: October 23
- Location: Rich Stadium
- Referee: Tom Dooley

=== Week 9 ===
Team	1	2	3	4	Total
Saints	0	7	0	14	21
• Bills	7	13	7	0	27

- Date: October 30
- Location: Rich Stadium
- Game attendance: 49,413
- Referee: Jim Tunney
- Television network: CBS

Scoring summary
Q1	4:06	BUF	Butler 15 yard pass from Ferguson (Danelo kick)	BUF 7–0
Q2	13:14	BUF	Hunter 40 yard pass from Ferguson (Danelo kick)	BUF 14–0
Q2	5:59	BUF	Mosley 22 yard pass from Ferguson (kick failed)	BUF 20–0
Q2	1:57	NO	Tice 12 yard pass from Wilson (Andersen kick)	BUF 20–7
Q3	0:19	BUF	Mosley 8 yard pass from Ferguson (Danelo kick)	BUF 27–7
Q4	7:33	NO	Brenner 3 yard pass from Wilson (Andersen kick)	BUF 27–14
Q4	3:34	NO	Young 5 yard pass from Wilson (Andersen kick)	BUF 27–21

The Bills knocked Ken Stabler out of the game at the end of the first quarter with a rib injury.

=== Week 10 ===
Team	1	2	3	4	Total
Bills	0	0	0	7	7
• Patriots	0	14	7	0	21

- Date: November 6
- Location: Sullivan Stadium
- Referee: Pat Haggerty

=== Week 11 ===
Team	1	2	3	4	Total
• Bills	0	0	14	10	24
Jets	0	14	3	0	17

- Date: November 13
- Location: Shea Stadium
- Game attendance: 48,513
- Game weather: 37 °F (2.8 °C) • 19 miles per hour (31 km/h; 17 kn)
- Referee: Gene Barth
- TV announcers (NBC): Charlie Jones

=== Week 12 ===
Los Angeles Raiders (8-3) at Buffalo Bills (7-4)

Team	1	2	3	4	Total
• Raiders	7	3	7	10	27
Bills	0	3	0	21	24

- Date: November 20
- Location: Rich Stadium - Orchard Park, New York
- Game start: 1:00pm EST
- Game attendance: 72,393
- Game weather: 52 °F (11.1 °C) • 12 miles per hour (19 km/h; 10 kn)
- Referee: Bob McElwee
- TV announcers (NFL on NBC): Don Criqui and Gene Washington

=== Week 13 ===
Team	1	2	3	4	Total
Bills	0	7	7	3	17
• Rams	0	14	10	17	41

- Date: November 27
- Location: Anaheim Stadium
- Referee: Ben Dreith

=== Week 14 ===
Team	1	2	3	4	Total
• Bills	0	7	0	7	14
Chiefs	0	3	3	3	9

- Date: December 4
- Location: Arrowhead Stadium
- Game start: 1:00 PM EST
- Game attendance: 27,104
- Game weather: 29 °F (−1.7 °C) • 8 miles per hour (13 km/h; 7.0 kn)
- Referee: Jerry Seeman
- TV announcers (NBC): Don Criqui

=== Week 15 ===
Team	1	2	3	4	Total
• 49ers	3	3	14	3	23
Bills	0	10	0	0	10

- Date: December 11
- Location: Rich Stadium Orchard Park, NY
- Game start: 1:00 PM EST
- Game attendance: 38,039
- Game weather: 27 °F (−2.8 °C) • 17–26 miles per hour (27–42 km/h; 15–23 kn) Cloudy
- Referee: Bob Frederic
- TV announcers (CBS): Dick Stockton, Wayne Walker

=== Week 16 ===
Team	1	2	3	4	Total
Bills	0	7	0	7	14
• Falcons	3	14	7	7	31

- Date: December 18
- Location: Atlanta-Fulton County Stadium
- Referee: Fred Silva

== Standings ==
AFC East
	W	L	T	PCT	DIV	CONF	PF	PA	STK
^{(2)} Miami Dolphins	12	4	0	.750	6–2	9–3	389	250	W5
New England Patriots	8	8	0	.500	4–4	6–6	274	289	L1
Buffalo Bills	8	8	0	.500	4–4	7–5	283	351	L2
Baltimore Colts	7	9	0	.438	3–5	5–9	264	354	W1
New York Jets	7	9	0	.438	3–5	4–8	313	331	L2

== Awards and honors ==
=== All-Pros ===
- Fred Smerlas, Nose tackle
- Steve Freeman, Safety
