= 1982 Buffalo Bills season =

23rd season in franchise history

- Owner: Ralph Wilson
- Head coach: Chuck Knox
- Home stadium: Rich Stadium

Results
- Record: 4–5
- Division place: 4th AFC East
- Playoffs: Did not qualify
- Pro Bowlers: DT Fred Smerlas; DE Ben Williams

The 1982 Buffalo Bills season was the franchise's 13th season in the National Football League, and the 23rd overall. Due to the 1982 NFL strike, the season was shortened to only nine games; the Bills' 4–5 record left them in the 9th spot in the AFC (one spot away from the last playoff seed), therefore eliminating the Bills from the playoffs in the 16-team tournament format.

The Bills led the league in rushing in 1982, with 1,371 yards (152.3 per game) on the ground. This was the last season with Chuck Knox as head coach, as negotiations for a new contract with ownership failed, which led him to leave Buffalo for the Seattle Seahawks in January 1983.

== Offseason ==
=== NFL draft ===
Linebacker Eugene Marve played linebacker for Buffalo for six seasons. Placekicker Gary Anderson went on to become the second-leading scorer in NFL history, although he did so with five other NFL teams, as he never played a regular-season game for Buffalo.

1982 Buffalo Bills draft
Round	Pick	Player	Position	College	Notes
1	19	Perry Tuttle	Wide receiver	Clemson	
2	48	Matt Kofler	Quarterback	San Diego State	
3	59	Eugene Marve	Linebacker	Saginaw Valley State	
4	93	Van Williams	Running back	Carson–Newman	
6	160	DeWayne Chivers	Tight end	South Carolina	
7	171	Gary Anderson *	Kicker	Syracuse	
8	218	Luc Tousignant	Quarterback	Fairmont State	
9	245	Dennis Edwards	Defensive end	USC	
10	272	Vic James	Defensive back	Colorado	
11	298	Frank Kalil	Guard	Arizona	
12	329	Tony Suber	Defensive tackle	Gardner–Webb	
Made roster † Pro Football Hall of Fame * Made at least one Pro Bowl during career

=== Undrafted free agents ===
1982 undrafted free agents of note
Player	Position	College
Bill Gompf	Linebacker	Utah

== Personnel ==
=== Staff/coaches ===
1982 Buffalo Bills staff
Front office
- Majority owner/team president – Ralph Wilson
- General manager – Stew Barber
- Vice president/minority owner – Pat McGroder

Coaching staff

- Head coach – Chuck Knox
- Assistant head coach - - Tom Caitlin

Offensive coaches

- Offensive coordinator / offensive line – Ray Proschaska
- Running backs coach – Chick Harris
- Quarterbacks coach - Kay Stephenson
- Wide receivers coach – Jack Donaldson

Defensive/special teams coaches

- Defensive coordinator / linebackers coach - Tom Caitlin
- Defensive line – Jim Carmody
- Defensive backs – Ralph Hawkins
- Special teams – Steve Moore

Special assignments

- Special assignments coach – Miller McCalmon

=== Roster ===
1982 Buffalo Bills roster
Quarterbacks (QB): 12 Joe Ferguson; 10 Matt Kofler; 17 Matt Robinson; Running backs (RB): 47 Curtis Brown; 20 Joe Cribbs; 25 Roland Hooks; 48 Roosevelt Leaks; 34 Booker Moore; Wide receivers (WR): 80 Jerry Butler; 87 Robert Holt; 82 Frank Lewis; 88 Mike Mosley; 89 Lou Piccone; 81 Perry Tuttle; Tight ends (TE): 86 Mark Brammer; 84 Buster Barnett	Offensive linemen (OL): 73 Jon Borchardt G; 78 Justin Cross T; 70 Joe Devlin T; 53 Will Grant C; 72 Ken Jones T; 61 Tom Lynch G; 67 Reggie McKenzie G; 51 Jim Ritcher G; 65 Tim Vogler C/G; Defensive linemen (DL): 97 Darrell Irvin DE; 91 Ken Johnson DE; 99 Mark Roopenian NT; 76 Fred Smerlas NT; 83 Sherman White DE; 77 Ben Williams DE	Linebackers (LB): 55 Jim Haslett ILB; 52 Chris Keating ILB; 60 Joey Lumpkin ILB; 54 Eugene Marve ILB; 62 Ervin Parker OLB; 58 Isiah Robertson OLB; 57 Lucius Sanford OLB; 41 Phil Villapiano OLB; Defensive backs (DB): 29 Mario Clark CB; 22 Steve Freeman SS; 42 Rod Kush SS; 24 Lemar Parrish CB; 38 Jeff Nixon FS; 26 Charles Romes CB; 45 Bill Simpson FS; 27 Chris Williams CB; Special teams (ST): 7 Greg Cater P; 1 Efrén Herrera K	Reserve: 92 DeWayne Chivers TE (NF-Inj.); 85 Byron Franklin WR (IR); -- Greg Jackson S (NF-Inj.); 33 Ted McKnight RB (IR); 59 Shane Nelson LB (IR); 40 Robb Riddick RB (IR); 23 Van Williams RB (IR); Rookies in italics

== Regular season ==
=== Schedule ===
Week	Date	Opponent	Result	Record	Game site	NFL.com recap
1	September 12	Kansas City Chiefs	**W** 14–9	1–0	Rich Stadium	Recap
2	September 16	Minnesota Vikings	**W** 23–22	2–0	Rich Stadium	Recap
Players' strike
3	November 21	**Miami Dolphins**	**L** 7–9	2–1	Rich Stadium	Recap
4	November 28	**Baltimore Colts**	**W** 20–0	3–1	Rich Stadium	Recap
5	December 5	at Green Bay Packers	**L** 21–33	3–2	Milwaukee County Stadium	Recap
6	December 12	Pittsburgh Steelers	**W** 13–0	4–2	Rich Stadium	Recap
7	December 19	at Tampa Bay Buccaneers	**L** 23–24	4–3	Tampa Stadium	Recap
8	December 27	at **Miami Dolphins**	**L** 10–27	4–4	Miami Orange Bowl	Recap
9	January 2	at **New England Patriots**	**L** 19–30	4–5	Schaefer Stadium	Recap
Note: Intra-division opponents are in **bold** text.

=== Game summaries ===
==== Week 1 ====
Team	1	2	3	4	Total
Chiefs	3	3	0	3	9
• **Bills**	7	7	0	0	14

- Date: September 12
- Location: Rich Stadium • Orchard Park, New York
- Game start: 1:00 p.m.
- Game weather: 73 °F (22.8 °C) • Wind 6 miles per hour (9.7 km/h; 5.2 kn)
- Referee: Jerry Seeman

Scoring summary
1	KC	Nick Lowery 39 yard field goal	Chiefs 3–0
1	BUF	Frank Lewis 20 yard pass from Joe Ferguson (Nick Mike-Mayer kick)	Bills 7–3
2	KC	Nick Lowery 47 yard field goal	Bills 7–6
2	BUF	Jerry Butler 6 yard pass from Joe Ferguson (Nick Mike-Mayer kick)	Bills 14–6
4	KC	Nick Lowery 42 yard field goal	Bills 14–9

==== Week 2 ====
Team	1	2	3	4	Total
Vikings	2	17	3	0	22
• Bills	0	7	6	10	23

- Date: Thursday September 16
- Location: Rich Stadium, Orchard Park, New York
- Game start: 8:30 p.m. EST
- Game weather: 60 °F (15.6 °C), wind 11 miles per hour (18 km/h; 9.6 kn)
- Referee: Fred Wyant
- TV announcers (ABC): Frank Gifford, Howard Cosell, Don Meredith, and Fran Tarkenton

Scoring summary
1	MIN	Safety, Moore tackled by Mullaney in end zone	Vikings 2–0
2	MIN	Bob Bruer 27 yard pass from Tommy Kramer (Rick Danmeier kick)	Vikings 9–0
2	MIN	Bob Bruer 2 yard pass from Tommy Kramer (Rick Danmeier kick)	Vikings 16–0
2	MIN	Rick Danmeier 43 yard field goal	Vikings 19–0
2	BUF	Frank Lewis 6 yard pass from Joe Ferguson (Nick Mike-Mayer kick)	Vikings 19–7
3	BUF	Jerry Butler 4 yard pass from Joe Ferguson (kick failed)	Vikings 19–13
3	MIN	Rick Danmeier 42 yard field goal	Vikings 22–13
4	BUF	Nick Mike-Mayer 21 yard field goal	Vikings 22–16
4	BUF	Jerry Butler 11 yard pass from Joe Ferguson (Nick Mike-Mayer kick)	Bills 23–22

==== Week 5 ====
Team	1	2	3	4	Total
Bills	0	7	0	14	21
• Packers	6	7	7	13	33

- Date: December 5
- Location: Milwaukee County Stadium
- Game start: 1:00 p.m. EST
- Game weather: 42 °F (5.6 °C) • Wind 12 miles per hour (19 km/h; 10 kn)
- Referee: Ben Dreith
- TV announcers (NBC): Bob Costas and Bob Trumpy

==== Week 6 ====
Terry Bradshaws worst game in NFL

Pittsburgh Steelers (4-1) at Buffalo Bills (3-2)

Team	1	2	3	4	Total
Steelers	0	0	0	0	0
• Bills	0	10	3	0	13

- Date: December 12
- Location: Rich Stadium, Orchard Park, New York
- Game start: 12:00 p.m. EST
- Game attendance: 58,391
- Game weather: 20 °F (−6.7 °C) • Wind 12 miles per hour (19 km/h; 10 kn); snow
- Referee: Pat Haggerty
- TV announcers (NBC): Don Criqui and John Brodie

Scoring summary
2	BUF	Roosevelt Leaks 1 yard rush (Efrén Herrera kick)	Bills 7–0
2	BUF	Efrén Herrera 34 yard field goal	Bills 10–0
3	BUF	Efrén Herrera 19 yard field goal	Bills 13–0

==== Week 8 ====
Buffalo Bills (4-3) at Miami Dolphins (5-2)

Team	1	2	3	4	Total
Bills	10	0	0	0	10
• Dolphins	0	7	13	7	27

- Date: December 27
- Location: Miami Orange Bowl, Miami, Florida
- Game start: 9:00 p.m. EST
- Game weather: 76 °F (24.4 °C) • Wind 16 miles per hour (26 km/h; 14 kn)
- Referee: Dick Jorgensen
- TV announcers (ABC Monday Night Football): Frank Gifford, Howard Cosell, and Don Meredith

=== Standings ===
AFC East
	W	L	T	PCT	DIV	CONF	PF	PA	STK
^{(2)} Miami Dolphins	7	2	0	.778	6–1	6–1	198	131	W3
^{(6)} New York Jets	6	3	0	.667	2–2	2–3	245	166	L1
^{(7)} New England Patriots	5	4	0	.556	3–1	5–3	143	157	W1
Buffalo Bills	4	5	0	.444	1–3	3–3	150	154	L3
Baltimore Colts	0	8	1	.056	0–5	0–7	113	236	L2

AFC
#	Team	W	L	T	PCT	PF	PA	STK
**Seeded postseason qualifiers**
1	Los Angeles Raiders	8	1	0	.889	260	200	W5
2 (Note: Miami finished ahead of Cincinnati based on better conference record (6–1 to Cincinnati’s 6–2).)	Miami Dolphins	7	2	0	.778	198	131	W3
3	Cincinnati Bengals	7	2	0	.778	232	177	W2
4 (Note: Pittsburgh finished ahead of San Diego based on better record against common opponents (3–1 to Chargers' 2–1). Conference tiebreak was initially used to eliminate New York Jets.) (Note: Pittsburgh and San Diego finished ahead of New York Jets based on conference record (Pittsburgh and San Diego 5–3 against Jets’ 2–3))	Pittsburgh Steelers	6	3	0	.667	204	146	W2
5	San Diego Chargers	6	3	0	.667	288	221	L1
6	New York Jets	6	3	0	.667	245	166	L1
7	New England Patriots	5	4	0	.556	143	157	W1
8 (Note: Cleveland finished ahead of Buffalo and Buffalo ahead of Seattle based on conference record (4–3 to Buffalo’s 3–3 to Seattle’s 3–5).)	Cleveland Browns	4	5	0	.444	140	182	L1
**Did not qualify for the postseason**
9	Buffalo Bills	4	5	0	.444	150	154	L3
10	Seattle Seahawks	4	5	0	.444	127	147	W1
11	Kansas City Chiefs	3	6	0	.333	176	184	W1
12	Denver Broncos	2	7	0	.222	148	226	L3
13	Houston Oilers	1	8	0	.111	136	245	L7
14	Baltimore Colts	0	8	1	.056	113	236	L2
**Tiebreakers**

== Awards and honors ==
=== All-Pros ===
First Team

- Fred Smerlas, Nose tackle

Second Team

- Ben Williams, Defensive end
