= 1981 Buffalo Bills season =

22nd season in franchise history

- Owner: Ralph Wilson
- Head coach: Chuck Knox
- Offensive coordinator: Ray Prochaska
- Defensive coordinator: Tom Catlin
- Home stadium: Rich Stadium

Results
- Record: 10–6
- Division place: 3rd AFC East
- Playoffs: Won Wild Card Playoffs (at Jets) 31–27; Lost Divisional Playoffs (at Bengals) 21–28
- Pro Bowlers: RB Joe Cribbs; WR Frank Lewis; DT Fred Smerlas

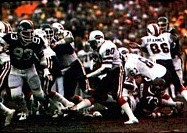
Bills' running back Joe Cribbs (middle) rushes the ball against the Jets in the 1981 AFC wild card game.

The 1981 Buffalo Bills season was the franchise's 12th season in the National Football League, and the 22nd overall.

The season's most memorable moment was probably a Hail Mary catch against the New England Patriots in Week Twelve. The 36-yard touchdown pass from Bills quarterback Joe Ferguson to running back Roland Hooks as time expired won the game for Buffalo, 20–17. The win proved to be crucial in giving Buffalo the final playoff spot in the AFC in 1981. The Bills qualified for the playoffs defeating their division rival New York Jets, 31–27 in the Wild Card game (their first postseason victory since 1965). The Bills would go on to lose, 28–21, to the Cincinnati Bengals in the Divisional playoffs.

== Offseason ==
The Bills were coming off of their first division title since 1966, and their first since the merger. Coach Chuck Knox's Bills, in his fourth season with the team, were considered a contender in the AFC.

In their 1981 NFL preview, Sports Illustrated's Paul Zimmerman wrote, "A word of advice: Go to Vegas and take the price on Buffalo to go all the way. The odds are right. Just look at how close the Bills came last year. ... The Bills are a hungry team, on the rise. They'll have to stay almost injury-free, though, because they're in big trouble if one of the big boys goes down, (Joe) Ferguson, Nose Guard Freddy Smerlas, Wide Receiver Jerry Butler or Halfback Joe Cribbs, who handled the ball more times (389) than any back in the NFL, counting passes caught and punt and kick returns as well as his rushes."

=== NFL draft ===
Running back Robb Riddick played eight seasons for the Bills; he started eight games and ran for 632 total yards in 1986, and he became a short-yardage specialist in 1988

Said Zimmerman about the team's first pick, "(Coach Chuck) Knox is a ball control coach, and he's been desperately trying to juice up the fullback position, to take some heat off the 190-pound Cribbs. But No. 1 draft choice Booker Moore from Penn State came down with a nerve disorder called Guillain–Barré syndrome."

1981 Buffalo Bills Draft
Round	Selection	Player	Position	College	Notes
1	28	Booker Moore	RB	Penn State	
2	49	Chris Williams	DB	LSU	
2	50	Byron Franklin	WR	Auburn	
3	76	Mike Mosley	WR	Texas A&M	
3	84	Robert Geathers	DT	South Carolina State	
5	135	Calvin Clark	DE	Purdue	
6	161	Robert Holt	WR	Baylor	
7	188	Steve Doolittle	LB	Colorado	
9	241	Robb Riddick	RB	Millersville (PA)	
10	272	Justin Cross	OT	Western Colorado	
11	299	Buster Barnett	TE	Jackson State	
12	326	Keith Clark	LB	Memphis State	

=== Undrafted free agents ===
1981 undrafted free agents of note
Player	Position	College
John Bungartz	Linebacker	Cal State Fullerton

== Personnel ==
=== Staff/coaches ===
1981 Buffalo Bills staff
Front office
- Majority owner/team president – Ralph Wilson
- General manager – Stew Barber
- Vice president/minority owner – Pat McGroder

Coaching staff

- Head coach – Chuck Knox
- Assistant head coach - - Tom Catlin

Offensive coaches

- Offensive coordinator / offensive line – Ray Proschaska
- Running backs coach – Chick Harris
- Quarterbacks coach - Kay Stephenson
- Wide receivers coach – Jack Donaldson

Defensive/special teams coaches

- Defensive coordinator / linebackers coach - Tom Catlin
- Defensive line – Jim Carmody
- Defensive backs – Ralph Hawkins
- Special teams – Steve Moore

Special assignments'

- Special assignments coach – Miller McCalmon

=== Roster ===
1981 Buffalo Bills roster
Quarterbacks (QB): 12 Joe Ferguson; 17 Matt Robinson; Running backs (RB): 47 Curtis Brown; 20 Joe Cribbs; 25 Roland Hooks; 48 Roosevelt Leaks; 40 Robb Riddick; Wide receivers (WR): 80 Jerry Butler; 85 Byron Franklin; 81 Ron Jessie; 82 Frank Lewis; 89 Lou Piccone; Tight ends (TE): 87 Steve Alvers; 84 Buster Barnett; 86 Mark Brammer	Offensive linemen (OL): 73 Jon Borchardt G; 70 Joe Devlin T; 69 Conrad Dobler G; 53 Will Grant C; 72 Ken Jones T; 61 Tom Lynch G; 51 Jim Ritcher G; 65 Tim Vogler C/G; Defensive linemen (DL): 97 Darrell Irvin DE; 71 Mike Kadish NT; 91 Ken Johnson DE; 76 Fred Smerlas NT; 83 Sherman White DE; 77 Ben Williams DE	Linebackers (LB): 55 Jim Haslett ILB; 50 Mike Humiston ILB; 62 Ervin Parker OLB; 58 Isiah Robertson OLB; 57 Lucius Sanford OLB; 41 Phil Villapiano ILB; Defensive backs (DB): 28 Rufus Bess CB; 29 Mario Clark CB; 22 Steve Freeman SS; 42 Rod Kush SS; 38 Jeff Nixon FS; 26 Charles Romes CB; 45 Bill Simpson FS; 27 Chris Williams CB; Special teams (ST): 7 Greg Cater P; 5 Nick Mike-Mayer K	Reserve: 14 Gene Bradley QB (IR); 56 Keith Clark LB (NF-Inj.); 63 Justin Cross T (IR); 96 Robert Geathers DE (IR); 35 Robert Holt WR (IR); 52 Chris Keating LB (IR); 30 Lawrence McCutcheon RB (IR); 67 Reggie McKenzie G (IR); 34 Booker Moore RB (NF-Ill.); 88 Mike Mosley WR (IR); 59 Shane Nelson LB (IR); 99 Mark Roopenian NT (IR); 64 John Schmeding G (Ret.); Rookies in italics

== Regular season ==
=== Schedule ===
Week	Date	Opponent	Result	Record	Venue	Attendance
1	September 6	**New York Jets**	**W** 31–0	1–0	Rich Stadium	79,754
2	September 13	at **Baltimore Colts**	**W** 35–3	2–0	Memorial Stadium	45,772
3	September 17	Philadelphia Eagles	**L** 14–20	2–1	Rich Stadium	78,331
4	September 27	at Cincinnati Bengals	**L** 24–27	2–2	Riverfront Stadium	46,418
5	October 4	**Baltimore Colts**	**W** 23–17	3–2	Rich Stadium	77,811
6	October 12	**Miami Dolphins**	**W** 31–21	4–2	Rich Stadium	78,576
7	October 18	at **New York Jets**	**L** 14–33	4–3	Shea Stadium	54,607
8	October 25	Denver Broncos	**W** 9–7	5–3	Rich Stadium	77,757
9	November 1	Cleveland Browns	**W** 22–13	6–3	Rich Stadium	78,266
10	November 9	at Dallas Cowboys	**L** 14–27	6–4	Texas Stadium	62,583
11	November 15	at St. Louis Cardinals	**L** 0–24	6–5	Busch Memorial Stadium	46,214
12	November 22	**New England Patriots**	**W** 20–17	7–5	Rich Stadium	71,593
13	November 29	Washington Redskins	**W** 21–14	8–5	Rich Stadium	59,624
14	December 6	at San Diego Chargers	**W** 28–27	9–5	Jack Murphy Stadium	51,488
15	December 13	at **New England Patriots**	**W** 19–10	10–5	Shaefer Stadium	42,549
16	December 19	at **Miami Dolphins**	**L** 6–16	10–6	Miami Orange Bowl	72,596
Note: Intra-division opponents are in **bold** text.

=== Standings ===
AFC East
	W	L	T	PCT	DIV	CONF	PF	PA	STK
^{(2)} Miami Dolphins	11	4	1	.719	5–2–1	8–3–1	345	275	W4
^{(4)} New York Jets	10	5	1	.656	6–1–1	8–5–1	355	287	W2
^{(5)} Buffalo Bills	10	6	0	.625	6–2	9–3	311	276	L1
Baltimore Colts	2	14	0	.125	2–6	2–10	259	533	W1
New England Patriots	2	14	0	.125	0–8	2–10	322	370	L9

=== Game summaries ===
==== Week 3: vs. Philadelphia Eagles ====
Team	1	2	3	4	Total
• **Eagles**	7	3	7	3	20
Bills	0	14	0	0	14

- Date: September 17, 1981
- Location: Rich Stadium
- Game start: 8:30pm EST
- Game weather: 55 °F (13 °C) • 8 miles per hour (13 km/h; 7.0 kn)
- Referee: Dick Jorgensen
- TV announcers (ABC): Frank Gifford, Don Meredith and Howard Cosell

==== Week 8: vs. Denver Broncos ====
Team	1	2	3	4	Total
Broncos	0	7	0	0	7
• **Bills**	0	3	3	3	9

- Date: October 25
- Location: Rich Stadium]
- Game start: 1:00 PM EST
- Game attendance: 77,757
- Game weather: 41 °F (5 °C) • 10 miles per hour (16 km/h; 8.7 kn)
- Referee: Gene Barth
- TV announcers (NBC): Don Criqui and John Brodie

==== Week 9: vs. Cleveland Browns ====
Team	1	2	3	4	Total
Browns	0	3	3	7	13
• **Bills**	6	7	2	7	22

- Date: November 1
- Location: Rich Stadium
- Game start: 1:00 PM EST
- Game attendance: 78,266
- Game weather: 51 °F (11 °C) • 9 miles per hour (14 km/h; 7.8 kn)
- Referee: Bob McElwee
- TV announcers (NBC): Don Criqui and John Brodie

==== Week 10: at Dallas Cowboys ====
Team	1	2	3	4	Total
Bills	7	7	0	0	14
• **Cowboys**	7	0	20	0	27

- Date: November 9, 1981
- Location: Texas Stadium
- Game start: 9:00 PM EST
- Game attendance: 62,583
- Game weather: 50 °F (10 °C) • 20 miles per hour (32 km/h; 17 kn)
- Referee: Dick Jorgensen
- TV announcers (ABC): Frank Gifford, Don Meredith, and Howard Cosell

Scoring summary
1	BUF	Jerry Butler 16 yard pass from Joe Ferguson (Nick Mike-Mayer kick)	BUF 7–0
1	DAL	Doug Cosbie 12 yard pass from Danny White (Rafael Septién kick)	Tied 7–7
2	BUF	Curtis Brown 9 yard pass from Joe Cribbs (Nick Mike-Mayer kick)	BUF 14–7
3	DAL	Tony Dorsett 73 yard pass from Danny White (Rafael Septien kick)	Tied 14–14
3	DAL	Tony Hill 37 yard pass from Danny White (Rafael Septien kick)	DAL 21–14
3	DAL	Rafael Septien 47 yard field goal	DAL 24–14
3	DAL	Rafael Septien 31 yard field goal	DAL 27–14

==== Week 14: at San Diego Chargers ====
Buffalo Bills at San Diego Chargers

Team	1	2	3	4	Total
• **Bills**	7	7	14	0	28
Chargers	7	14	3	3	27

- Date: December 6
- Location: Jack Murphy Stadium, San Diego, California
- Game start: 4:00pm PST
- Game weather: 59 °F (15 °C), wind 9 mph (14 km/h)
- Referee: Fred Wyant
- TV announcers (NBC): Dick Enberg and Merlin Olsen

Scoring summary
1	Chargers	Chuck Muncie 9 yard rush (Rolf Benirschke kick)	Chergers 7–0
1	Bills	Joe Ferguson 3-yard run (Nick Mike-Mayer kick)	Tie 7–7
2	Chargers	Wes Chandler 17-yard pass from Dan Fouts (Rolf Benirschke kick)	Chargers 14–7
2	Bills	Roosevelt Leaks 9-yard rush (Nick Mike-Mayer)	Tie 14–14
2	Chargers	Kellen Winslow 67-yard pass from Dan Fouts (Rolf Benirschke kick)	Chargers 21–14
3	Bills	Roosevelt Leaks 1-yard run (Nick Mike-Mayer kick)	Tie 21–21
3	Chargers	Rolf Benirschke 29-yard field goal	Chargers 24–21
3	Bills	Joe Cribbs 1-yard run (Nick Mike-Mayer kick)	Bills 28–24
4	Chargers	Rolf Benirschke 27-yard field goal	Bills 28–27

Coming off their win at home against the Washington Redskins, the Buffalo Bills traveled to San Diego to face the Chargers and their potent offense. Buffalo's defense would face a tall task in slowing the Chargers who, in their previous two games, outscored their opponents 89–38. This game was a clash of style that pitted the Chargers and their pass-oriented Air Coryell offense versus Chuck Knox and his run-heavy, ball control offense. Defensively the teams also contrasted starkly with the Chargers ranking near the bottom of the NFL (26th overall), and the Bills ranking among the top defenses (6th overall). In the 1st quarter both teams traded rushing touchdowns as Chuck Muncie scored on a 9-yard run to give the home a lead, and Bills' quarterback Joe Ferguson scored on a 3-yard run to tie the game. The 2nd quarter produced a 21-point flurry that began when Dan Fouts threw a touchdown pass of 17 yards to Wes Chandler. The Bills answered when Roosevelt Leaks scored on a 9-yard run to tie the game briefly at 14–14. Dan Fouts put the Chargers ahead before the half when he connected with Kellen Winslow on a 67-yard touchdown pass. In the 3rd quarter the Bills tied the game when Roosevelt Leaks scored his second touchdown of the game on a 1-yard run. The Chargers took back the lead with Rolf Benirschke kicking a 29-yard field goal to give the Chargers a 24–21 lead. The Bills answered with a fourth rushing touchdown when Joe Cribbs scored on a 1-yard run. The Chargers cut the Bills' lead to 28–27 in fourth quarter when Rolf Benirschke kicked a 27-yard field. The Bills hung on to win the game and upset the heavily favored Chargers. Despite the Chargers outgaining the Bills 482 to 318 in total yards, the Bills forced three Chargers turnovers (1 fumble, 2 INTs) that allowed the Bills to keep the Chargers' potent offense on the sideline. With the win the Bills improved to 9–5.

This was the last time the Bills ever beat the Chargers in San Diego. Buffalo didn't beat the Chargers on the road again until 2023, by which point they had moved back to Los Angeles.

Stats

- Dan Fouts 28/42, 343 Yds, 2 TD, INT
- Chuck Muncie 22 Rush, 113 Rush Yds, 1 Rush TD
- Kellen Winslow 6 Rec, 126 Yds, 1 TD
- Joe Ferguson 13/29, 248 Yds, 4 Rush Yds, 1 Rush TD
- Roosevelt Leaks 8 Rush, 28 Rush Yds, 2 Rush TDs
- Frank Lewis 5 Rec, 113 Yds

== Playoffs ==
Round	Date	Opponent	Result	Record	Venue	Recap
Wildcard	December 27	at New York Jets	W 31–27	2–1	Shea Stadium	57,050
Divisional	January 3, 1982	at Cincinnati Bengals	L 21–28	1–1	Riverfront Stadium	55,420

=== Wild card ===
Team	1	2	3	4	Total
• Bills	17	7	0	7	31
Jets	0	10	3	14	27

- Date: December 27
- Location: Shea Stadium Flushing, Queens, New York
- Game start: 12:00 p.m. EST
- Game attendance: 57,050
- Game weather: Light rain; 37 °F (3 °C); wind 17 mph (27 km/h)
- Referee: Bob McElwee
- TV announcers (NBC): Charlie Jones and Len Dawson

Scoring summary
Q1	00:16	BUF	Romes 26 yard fumble return (Mike-Mayer kick)	BUF 7–0
Q1		BUF	Lewis 50 yard pass from Ferguson (Mike-Mayer kick)	BUF 14–0
Q1		BUF	Mike-Mayer 29 yard field goal	BUF 17–0
Q2		BUF	Lewis 26 yard pass from Ferguson (Mike-Mayer kick)	BUF 24–0
Q2		NYJ	Shuler 30 yard pass from Todd (Leahy kick)	BUF 24–7
Q2		NYJ	Leahy 26 yard field goal	BUF 24–10
Q3		NYJ	Leahy 19 yard field goal	BUF 24–13
Q4		BUF	Cribbs 45 yard run (Mike-Mayer kick)	BUF 31–13
Q4		NYJ	Jones 30 yard pass from Todd (Leahy kick)	BUF 31–20
Q4		NYJ	Long 1 yard run (Leahy kick)	BUF 31–27

The Bills traveled to Shea Stadium, where the Jets were playing in their first playoff game since the 1970 merger. In a cold rain the Jets got off to a poor start as Bruce Harper fumbled the opening kickoff at his 25 and Charles Romes ran back the fumble for a touchdown only sixteen seconds into the matchup. The Bills raced to a 24–0 lead in the second quarter as Frank Lewis caught two Joe Ferguson passes for touchdowns; the first was a pass from the Bills 40 yard line caught by Lewis at the Jets 32 and run in, then Joe Cribbs caught a 50-yarder, setting up Lewis' second catch; later Rufus Bess picked off Richard Todd and ran back 49 yards, setting up a field goal. But in the second the Jets began clawing back as Mickey Shuler caught a 30-yard touchdown in traffic (it was Shuler's first catch of the entire 1981 season) from Todd and following a Greg Buttle interception of Ferguson Pat Leahy booted a 26-yard field goal. A 19-yarder from Leahy was the only score in the third, then early in the fourth Ferguson was picked off by Donald Dykes, but Todd was intercepted by Bill Simpson. Following the Simpson pick Ferguson was intercepted again, by Jerry Holmes, but the Bills defense forced a mediocre punt by Chuck Ramsey caught at the 50. Three plays later Joe Cribbs caught a toss-sweep and ran in a 45-yard touchdown for Buffalo. But the Jets refused to give in; Todd tossed a 30-yard score to Bobby Jones and later Kevin Long ran in a 1-yard score. The Jets got the ball back in the final minutes, but a sack by Fred Smerlas led to a last-ditch Todd drive to the endzone; after completions to Gaffney and Scott Dierking Todd fired from the Bills 11 for the endzone but was picked off by Bill Simpson, ending a 31–27 Bills playoff win, only the third in the team's history and first since winning back-to-back AFL titles in the 1964 and '65 seasons.

=== Divisional ===
Team	1	2	3	4	Total
Bills	0	7	7	7	21
• Bengals	14	0	7	7	28

- Date: January 3
- Location: Cincinnati, OH
- Game start: 1:00 p.m. EST
- Game attendance: 55,420
- Game weather: 45 °F (7 °C); wind 14 mph (23 km/h)
- Referee: Pat Haggerty
- TV announcers (NBC): Dick Enberg and Merlin Olsen

Scoring summary
Q1	CIN	Charles Alexander 4 yard rush (Jim Breech kick)	CIN 7–0
Q1	CIN	Johnson 1 yard rush (Jim Breech kick)	CIN 14–0
Q2	BUF	Joe Cribbs 1 yard rush (Nick Mike-Mayer kick)	CIN 14–7
Q3	BUF	Joe Cribbs 44 yard rush (Mike-Mayer kick)	TIE 14–14
Q3	CIN	Charles Alexander 20 yard rush (Jim Breech kick)	CIN 21–14
Q4	BUF	Jerry Butler 21 yard pass from Joe Ferguson (Nick Mike-Mayer kick)	TIE 21–21
Q4	CIN	Cris Collinsworth 16 yard pass from Ken Anderson	CIN 28–21

After their thrilling Wild Card win in Shea Stadium, the Buffalo Bills traveled to Riverfront Stadium to play the #1 seeded Cincinnati Bengals. The Bills fell behind early when Cincinnati scored two rushing touchdowns in the 1st quarter to take a 14–0 lead. The Bills began chipping away at the deficit in the 2nd quarter when Joe Cribbs scored from 1 yard out and cut Cincinnati's lead to 14–7 at the half. In the 3rd quarter the Bills tied the game when Joe Cribbs scored on a 44-yard touchdown run. The Bengals promptly retook the lead with a 20-yard touchdown run from Charles Alexander. The Bills fought back and tied the game again in the 4th quarter when Jerry Butler caught a 21-yard touchdown pass from Joe Ferguson. The Bengals broke the deadlock and took a 28–21 lead when Cris Collinsworth scored on a 16-yard touchdown pass from Ken Anderson. The Bills attempted to tie the game at the end of regulation, but Joe Ferguson's fourth down pass fell incomplete and Cincinnati held on for the win.

== Awards and honors ==
=== All-Pros ===
First Team

- Fred Smerlas, Nose tackle

Second Team

- Joe Cribbs, Running back
- Frank Lewis, Wide receiver
