= 1980 Buffalo Bills season =

21st season in franchise history

- Owner: Ralph Wilson
- Head coach: Chuck Knox
- Offensive coordinator: Ray Prochaska
- Defensive coordinator: Tom Catlin
- Home stadium: Rich Stadium

Results
- Record: 11–5
- Division place: 1st AFC East
- Playoffs: Lost Divisional Playoffs (at Chargers) 14–20
- All-Pros: NT Fred Smerlas (1st team)
- Pro Bowlers: RB Joe Cribbs; WR Jerry Butler; NT Fred Smerlas

The 1980 Buffalo Bills season was the franchise's 11th season in the National Football League, and the 21st overall. Their 11–5 record was tied for best in the AFC.

The Bills' defense allowed only 260 points in 1980, third-best in the league, whilst their 4,101 total yards surrendered was best in the NFL in 1980. Buffalo's defense was well represented on the UPI All-AFC team: nose tackle Fred Smerlas and linebacker Jim Haslett – two-thirds of Buffalo's "Bermuda Triangle" with linebacker Shane Nelson – were named to the 1st team All-AFC. Defensive end Ben Williams was named to the second team.

Although Buffalo's offensive statistics were not as impressive as its defense, four offensive players were named All-AFC: left guard Reggie McKenzie, left tackle Ken Jones, wide receiver Jerry Butler and rookie running back Joe Cribbs.

Cribbs rushed for 1,185 yards and made his first Pro Bowl. Jerry Butler and Fred Smerlas also were selected to play in the annual all-star game.

== Breaking "The Streak" ==
The Bills had not beaten the Miami Dolphins in the entire decade of the 1970s, a streak of twenty straight losses, the longest in NFL history. The last time the Bills had defeated Miami was 1969.

The Bills had been outscored 565 (28.5 points per games) to 299 (14.5) during the 1970s by the Dolphins, failing to score more than ten points in over a third of the contests (7). They were shut out three times. Conversely, the Dolphins were held under twenty points just four times, and scored 45 points on the Bills twice. The domination was so thorough that the Bills only lost by one score or less five times, and Don Shula had never lost to Buffalo since taking over as Dolphins coach in 1970. The Bills only held a lead at any point in eight of the games, and only twice in the fourth quarter. Joe Ferguson had lost to the Dolphins 14 straight times.

On opening day of the 1980 season, Miami visited Rich Stadium, attempting to extend the streak to 21 games. At the end of three quarters, Miami led 7–3. In the fourth quarter, running back Roosevelt Leaks scored the go-ahead touchdown to make the score 10–7. Joe Cribbs added a second touchdown to extend the lead to 17–7, and Jeff Nixon intercepted his third pass of the game with only 36 seconds left, breaking the streak at 20 games.

A rowdy crowd of 79,000 fans celebrated, and many stormed the field to tear down the goal posts, carrying them around the field. Joe Cribbs contributed 131 combined yards of offense for the triumphant Bills.

The rivalry continued well into the 1990s, but with different results: from 1986 to 1996—the years in which Bills quarterback Jim Kelly and Dolphins quarterback Dan Marino played at the same time—the Bills won 14 of 22 match-ups between the teams.

== Offseason ==
=== NFL draft ===
North Carolina State's Jim Ritcher became an anchor of the Buffalo offensive line for the next 14 years; he was the starter for all four Buffalo Super Bowl teams, and was second-team All-Pro in 1991.

Running back Joe Cribbs was Buffalo's starting running back from 1980 to 1983, and again in 1985 (after returning from one year in the USFL).

Tight end Mark Brammer played for the Bills for five seasons. Greg Cater was Buffalo's starting punter from 1980 until 1983.

1980 Buffalo Bills draft
Round	Pick	Player	Position	College	Notes
1	16	Jim Ritcher *	Guard	North Carolina State	
2	29	Joe Cribbs *	Running back	Auburn	
2	37	Gene Bradley	Quarterback	Arkansas State	
3	67	Mark Brammer	Tight end	Michigan State	
3	71	John Schmeding	Guard	Boston College	
4	93	Ervin Parker	Linebacker	South Carolina State	
5	119	Jeff Pyburn	Defensive back	Georgia	
5	129	Keith Lee	Defensive back	Colorado State	
8	202	Todd Krueger	Quarterback	Northern Michigan	
9	231	Kent Davis	Defensive back	Southeast Missouri State	
10	259	Greg Cater	Punter	Chattanooga	
11	286	Joe Gordon	Defensive tackle	Grambling State	
12	316	Roger Lapham	Tight end	Maine	
Made roster * Made at least one Pro Bowl during career

=== Undrafted free agents ===
1980 undrafted free agents of note
Player	Position	College
Dan Conway	Fullback	Boston College
Jay Edwards	Defensive back	San Jose State
Gray Nord	Tight end	Louisville
Steve Otts	Linebacker	Michigan State
Larry Reed	Fullback	Michigan
Paul Rogind	Kicker	Minnesota

== Personnel ==
=== Staff/Coaches ===
1980 Buffalo Bills staff
Front office
- Majority owner/team president – Ralph Wilson
- General manager – Stew Barber
- Vice president/minority owner – Pat McGroder

Coaching staff

- Head coach – Chuck Knox

Offensive coaches

- Offensive coordinator / offensive line – Ray Prochaska
- Running backs coach – Elijah Pitts
- Quarterbacks coach - Kay Stephenson
- Wide receivers coach – Jack Donaldson

Defensive/special teams coaches

- Defensive coordinator / linebackers coach - Tom Catlin
- Defensive line – Willie Zapalac
- Defensive backs – Jim Wagstaff
- Special teams – Steve Moore & Elijah Pitts

Special assignments'

- Special assignments coach – Miller McCalmon

=== Roster ===
1980 Buffalo Bills roster
Quarterbacks (QB): 12 Joe Ferguson; 10 David Humm; 11 Dan Manucci; Running backs (RB): 47 Curtis Brown; 20 Joe Cribbs; 25 Roland Hooks; 48 Roosevelt Leaks; 40 Terry Miller; Wide receivers (WR): 80 Jerry Butler; 19 Duke Fergerson; 81 Ron Jessie; 82 Frank Lewis; 89 Lou Piccone; Tight ends (TE): 86 Mark Brammer; 88 Reuben Gant	Offensive linemen (OL): 73 Jon Borchardt T/G; 70 Joe Devlin T; 69 Conrad Dobler G; 53 Will Grant C; 74 Dee Hardison T; 72 Ken Jones T; 67 Reggie McKenzie G; 51 Jim Ritcher C/G; Defensive linemen (DL): 90 Scott Hutchinson DE; 97 Darrell Irvin DE; 71 Mike Kadish NT; 91 Ken Johnson DE; 76 Fred Smerlas NT; 83 Sherman White DE; 77 Ben Williams DE	Linebackers (LB): 55 Jim Haslett ILB; 59 Shane Nelson ILB; 62 Ervin Parker OLB; 58 Isiah Robertson OLB; 57 Lucius Sanford OLB; 41 Phil Villapiano ILB; Defensive backs (DB): 28 Rufus Bess CB; 29 Mario Clark CB; 22 Steve Freeman SS; 38 Jeff Nixon FS; 26 Charles Romes CB; 46 Roland Solomon CB; 45 Bill Simpson FS; Special teams (ST): 7 Greg Cater P; 5 Nick Mike-Mayer K	Reserve: -- Aaron Ball LB (IR); 14 Gene Bradley QB (IR); -- Phil Dokes DE (Left squad); 21 Doug Greene S (IR); -- Mekeli Ieremia DE (IR); 52 Chris Keating LB (IR); 16 Todd Krueger QB (IR); 42 Rod Kush S (IR); -- Keith Lee CB (IR); 75 Herman Parker G (IR); 64 John Schmeding G (IR); 65 Tim Vogler G/C (IR); -- Leonard Willis WR (IR); Rookies in italics

== Regular season ==
Sports Illustrated's Paul Zimmerman wrote about the Bills' 1980 season, "It was a euphoric kind of year for Buffalo. Chuck Knox and his defensive coordinator, Tom Catlin, built the defense into No. 1 in the NFL with virtually the same people who had been lousy in '79. The Bills even beat Miami for the first time in a generation. And then Quarterback Joe Ferguson picked exactly the wrong time of year to sprain his ankle – the playoffs. And San Diego ended the dream."

=== Schedule ===
Week	Date	Opponent	Result	Record	Venue	Recap
1	September 7	**Miami Dolphins**	**W** 17–7	1–0	Rich Stadium	Recap
2	September 14	**New York Jets**	**W** 20–10	2–0	Rich Stadium	Recap
3	September 21	at New Orleans Saints	**W** 35–26	3–0	Louisiana Superdome	Recap
4	September 28	Oakland Raiders	**W** 24–7	4–0	Rich Stadium	Recap
5	October 5	at San Diego Chargers	**W** 26–24	5–0	San Diego Stadium	Recap
6	October 12	**Baltimore Colts**	**L** 12–17	5–1	Rich Stadium	Recap
7	October 19	at **Miami Dolphins**	**L** 14–17	5–2	Orange Bowl	Recap
8	October 26	**New England Patriots**	**W** 31–13	6–2	Rich Stadium	Recap
9	November 2	Atlanta Falcons	**L** 14–30	6–3	Rich Stadium	Recap
10	November 9	at **New York Jets**	**W** 31–24	7–3	Shea Stadium	Recap
11	November 16	at Cincinnati Bengals	**W** 14–0	8–3	Riverfront Stadium	Recap
12	November 23	Pittsburgh Steelers	**W** 28–13	9–3	Rich Stadium	Recap
13	November 30	at **Baltimore Colts**	**L** 24–28	9–4	Memorial Stadium	Recap
14	December 7	Los Angeles Rams	**W** 10–7 (OT)	10–4	Rich Stadium	Recap
15	December 14	at **New England Patriots**	**L** 2–24	10–5	Foxboro Stadium	Recap
16	December 21	at San Francisco 49ers	**W** 18–13	11–5	Candlestick Park	Recap
Note: Intra-division opponents are in **bold** text.

=== Standings ===
AFC East
	W	L	T	PCT	DIV	CONF	PF	PA	STK
^{(3)} Buffalo Bills	11	5	0	.688	4–4	8–4	320	260	W1
New England Patriots	10	6	0	.625	6–2	9–3	441	325	W2
Miami Dolphins	8	8	0	.500	3–5	4–8	266	305	L1
Baltimore Colts	7	9	0	.438	5–3	6–8	355	387	L3
New York Jets	4	12	0	.250	2–6	3–9	302	395	W1

=== Game summaries ===
==== Week 1 vs Dolphins ====
Week One: Miami Dolphins (0–0) at Buffalo Bills (0–0)

Quarter	1	2	3	4	Total
Dolphins	0	0	7	0	**7**
**Bills**	0	3	0	14	**17**

at Rich Stadium, Orchard Park, New York

- Date: September 7
- Game time: 1:00 p.m. EDT
- Game weather: 64 °F (18 °C)
- Game attendance: 79,598
- Referee: Gordon McCarter
- TV announcers (NBC): Bob Costas and Mike Haffner
- Box Score

Game information

First quarter

- No scoring

Second quarter

- BUF – Nick Mike-Mayer 40-yard field goal. Bills 3–0.

Third quarter

- MIA – Tony Nathan 4-yard pass from Bob Griese (Uwe von Schamann kick). Dolphins 7–3.

Fourth quarter

- BUF – Roosevelt Leaks 4-yard pass from Joe Ferguson (Nick Mike-Mayer kick). Bills 10–7.
- BUF – Joe Cribbs 2-yard run (Nick Mike-Mayer kick). Bills 17–7.

Top passers

- MIA – Bob Griese – 11/18, 101 yards, TD, 2 INT
- BUF – Joe Ferguson – 20/32, 198 yards, TD, 5 INT

Top rushers

- MIA – Steve Howell – 6 rushes, 43 yards
- BUF – Joe Cribbs – 18 rushes, 60 yards, TD

Top receivers

- MIA – Duriel Harris – 3 receptions, 42 yards
- BUF – Joe Cribbs – 9 receptions, 71 yards

==== Week 2 vs Jets ====
Week Two: New York Jets (0–1) at Buffalo Bills (1–0)

Quarter	1	2	3	4	Total
Jets	3	0	0	7	**10**
**Bills**	0	10	10	0	**20**

at Rich Stadium, Orchard Park, New York

- Date: September 14
- Game time: 1:00 p.m.
- Game weather: 68 °F (20 °C)
- Game attendance: 65,315
- Referee: Pat Haggerty
- TV announcers (NBC): Don Criqui and John Brodie
- Box Score

Game information

First quarter

- NYJ – Pat Leahy 44-yard field goal. Jets 3–0.

Second quarter

- BUF – Joe Cribbs 1-yard run (Nick Mike-Mayer kick). Bills 7–3.
- BUF – Nick Mike-Mayer 47-yard field goal. Bills 10–3.

Third quarter

- BUF – Nick Mike-Mayer 38-yard field goal. Bills 13–3.
- BUF – Jeff Nixon 50-yard interception return (Nick Mike-Mayer kick). Bills 20–3.

Fourth quarter

- NYJ – Clark Gaines 11-yard pass from Richard Todd (Pat Leahy kick). Bills 20–10.

Top passers

- NYJ – Richard Todd – 19/34, 168 yards, TD, INT
- BUF – Joe Ferguson – 18/29, 207 yards

Top rushers

- NYJ – Clark Gaines – 14 rushes, 94 yards
- BUF – Roosevelt Leaks – 12 rushes, 58 yards

Top receivers

- NYJ – Clark Gaines – 12 receptions, 91 yards
- BUF – Reuben Gant – 4 receptions, 84 yards

==== Week 3 at Saints ====
Week Three: Buffalo Bills (2–0) at New Orleans Saints (0–2)

Quarter	1	2	3	4	Total
**Bills**	7	7	7	14	**35**
Saints	0	19	0	7	**26**

at Louisiana Superdome, New Orleans, Louisiana

- Date: September 21
- Game time: 1:00 p.m. CDT
- Game weather: Indoors (dome)
- Game attendance: 51,154
- Referee: Fred Wyant
- TV announcers (NBC): Jay Rudolph and Gene Washington
- Box Score

Game information

First quarter

- BUF – Frank Lewis 12-yard pass from Joe Ferguson (Nick Mike-Mayer kick). Bills 7–0.

Second quarter

- NO – Chuck Muncie 1-yard run (Benny Ricardo kick). Tie 7–7.
- BUF – Joe Cribbs 12-yard run (Nick Mike-Mayer kick). Bills 14–7.
- NO – Ike Harris 44-yard pass from Archie Manning. Bills 14–13.
- NO – Benny Ricardo 45-yard field goal. Saints 16–14.
- NO – Benny Ricardo 47-yard field goal. Saints 19–14.

Third quarter

- BUF – Frank Lewis 18-yard pass from Joe Ferguson (Nick Mike-Mayer kick). Bills 21–19.

Fourth quarter

- BUF – Mark Brammer 2-yard pass from Joe Ferguson (Nick Mike-Mayer kick). Bills 28–19.
- BUF – Joe Cribbs 7-yard run (Nick Mike-Mayer kick). Bills 35-19.
- NO – Ike Harris 15-yard pass from Archie Manning (Benny Ricardo kick). Bills 35–26.

Top passers

- BUF – Joe Ferguson – 22/31, 295 yards, 3 TD, 2 INT
- NO – Archie Manning – 24/34, 285 yards, 2 TD

Top rushers

- BUF – Joe Cribbs – 22 rushes, 89 yards, 2 TD
- NO – Chuck Muncie – 10 rushes, 22 yards

Top receivers

- BUF – Jerry Butler – 5 receptions, 133 yards
- NO – Brooks Williams – 6 receptions, 89 yards

==== Week 4 vs Raiders ====
Week Four: Oakland Raiders (2–1) at Buffalo Bills (3–0)

Quarter	1	2	3	4	Total
Raiders	0	0	7	0	**7**
**Bills**	7	10	0	7	**24**

at Rich Stadium, Orchard Park, New York

- Date: September 28
- Game time: 1:00 p.m. EDT
- Game weather: 54 °F (12 °C)
- Game attendance: 77,259
- Referee: Dick Jorgensen
- TV announcers (NBC): Don Criqui and John Brodie
- Box Score

Game information

First quarter

- BUF – Curtis Brown 4-yard run (Nick Mike-Mayer kick). Bills 7–0.

Second quarter

- BUF – Joe Cribbs 1-yard run (Nick Mike-Mayer kick). Bills 14–0.
- BUF – Nick Mike-Mayer 30-yard field goal. Bills 17–0.

Third quarter

- OAK – Lester Hayes 48-yard interception return (Chris Bahr kick). Bills 17–7.

Fourth quarter

- BUF – Joe Cribbs 21-yard pass from Joe Ferguson (Nick Mike-Mayer kick). Bills 24–7.

Top passers

- OAK – Dan Pastorini – 10/20, 158 yards, 2 INT
- BUF – Joe Ferguson – 17/22, 175 yards, TD, INT

Top rushers

- OAK – Mark van Eeghen – 10 rushes, 46 yards
- BUF – Joe Cribbs – 30 rushes, 90 yards, TD

Top receivers

- OAK – Bob Chandler – 3 receptions, 87 yards
- BUF – Jerry Butler – 3 receptions, 49 yards

==== Week 5 at Chargers ====
Week Five: Buffalo Bills (4–0) at San Diego Chargers (4–0)

Quarter	1	2	3	4	Total
**Bills**	3	9	0	14	**26**
Chargers	7	10	7	0	**24**

at San Diego Stadium, San Diego, California

- Date: October 5
- Game time: 1:00 p.m. PDT
- Game weather: 68 °F (20 °C)
- Game attendance: 51,982
- Referee: Bob McElwee
- TV announcers (NBC): Charlie Jones and Len Dawson
- Box score

Game information

**First quarter**

- BUF – Nick Mike-Mayer 48-yard field goal, 10:11. Bills 3–0. **Drive: 6 plays, 18 yards, 3:17.**
- SDG – Kellen Winslow 4-yard pass from Dan Fouts (Rolf Benirschke kick), 5:44. Chargers 7–3. **Drive: 11 plays, 74 yards, 2:50.**

**Second quarter**

- SDG – John Jefferson 5-yard pass from Dan Fouts (Rolf Benirschke kick), 14:56. Chargers 14–3. **Drive: 9 plays, 55 yards, 2:02.**
- BUF – Nick Mike-Mayer 29-yard field goal, 8:51. Chargers 14–6. **Drive: 12 plays, 69 yards, 6:05.**
- BUF – Lucius Sanford blocked punt recovery in end zone (kick failed), 2:24. Chargers 14–12.
- SDG – Rolf Benirschke 29-yard field goal, 0:12. Chargers 17–12. **Drive: 10 plays, 76 yards, 2:12.**

**Third quarter**

- SDG – Clarence Williams 3-yard run (Rolf Benirschke kick), 6:19. Chargers 24–12. **Drive: 6 plays, 39 yards, 2:25.**

**Fourth quarter**

- BUF – Mark Brammer 9-yard pass from Joe Ferguson (Nick Mike-Mayer kick), 10:43. Chargers 24–19. **Drive: 4 plays, 16 yards, 1:34.**
- BUF – Joe Cribbs 3-yard run (Nick Mike-Mayer kick), 7:28. Bills 26–24. **Drive: 5 plays, 21 yards, 2:54.**

**Top passers**

- BUF – Joe Ferguson – 14/28, 129 yards, TD
- SD – Dan Fouts – 20/35, 220 yards, 2 TD, INT

**Top rushers**

- BUF – Joe Cribbs – 23 rushes, 87 yards, TD
- SD – Chuck Muncie – 10 rushes, 37 yards

**Top receivers**

- BUF – Jerry Butler – 3 receptions, 44 yards
- SD – John Jefferson – 7 receptions, 85 yards, TD

==== Week 6 vs Colts ====
Week Six: Baltimore Colts (3–2) at Buffalo Bills (5–0)

Quarter	1	2	3	4	Total
**Colts**	10	7	0	0	**17**
Bills	0	9	0	3	**12**

at Rich Stadium, Orchard Park, New York

- Date: October 12
- Game time: 1:00 p.m. EDT
- Game weather: 49 °F (9 °C)
- Game attendance: 73,634
- Referee: Jim Tunney
- TV: NBC
- Box Score

Game information

**First quarter**

- BAL – Mike Siani 38-yard pass from Bert Jones (Steve Mike-Mayer kick). Colts 7–0.
- BAL – Steve Mike-Mayer 21-yard field goal. Colts 10–0.

**Second quarter**

- BUF – Roosevelt Leaks 1-yard run. Colts 10–6.
- BAL – Don McCauley 1-yard run (Steve Mike-Mayer kick). Colts 17–6.
- BUF – Nick Mike-Mayer 49-yard field goal. Colts 17–9.

**Third quarter**

- No scoring

**Fourth quarter**

- BUF – Nick Mike-Mayer 20-yard field goal. Colts 17–12.

Top passers

- BAL – Bert Jones – 10/21, 206 yards, TD, INT
- BUF – Joe Ferguson – 17/36, 210 yards, INT

Top rushers

- BAL – Joe Washington – 22 rushes, 74 yards
- BUF – Joe Cribbs – 18 rushes, 76 yards

Top receivers

- BAL – Mike Siani – 4 receptions, 91 yards, TD
- BUF – Frank Lewis – 3 receptions, 52 yards

==== Week 7 at Dolphins ====
Week Seven: Buffalo Bills (5–1) at Miami Dolphins (3–3)

Quarter	1	2	3	4	Total
Bills	0	0	7	7	**14**
**Dolphins**	7	7	3	0	**17**

at Orange Bowl, Miami, Florida

- Date: October 19
- Game time: 1:00 p.m. EDT
- Game weather: 80 °F (27 °C)
- Game attendance: 41,636
- Referee: Red Cashion
- TV announcers (NBC): Dick Enberg and Merlin Olsen
- Box Score

Game information

**First quarter**

- MIA – Don Bessillieu 44-yard fumble return (Uwe von Schamann kick). Dolphins 7–0.

**Second quarter**

- MIA – Nat Moore 3-yard pass from David Woodley (Uwe von Schamann kick). Dolphins 14–0.

**Third quarter**

- BUF – Joe Cribbs 2-yard run (Nick Mike-Mayer kick). Dolphins 14–7.
- MIA – Uwe von Schamann 23-yard field goal. Dolphins 17–7.

**Fourth quarter**

- BUF – Jerry Butler 7-yard pass from Joe Ferguson (Nick Mike-Mayer kick). Dolphins 17–14.

Top passers

- BUF – Joe Ferguson – 24/42, 221 yards, TD
- MIA – David Woodley – 11/17, 93 yards, TD, INT

Top rushers

- BUF – Joe Cribbs – 14 rushes, 38 yards, TD
- MIA – Terry Robiskie – 18 rushes, 84 yards

Top receivers

- BUF – Frank Lewis – 4 receptions, 71 yards
- MIA – Nat Moore – 4 receptions, 39 yards, TD

==== Week 8 vs Patriots ====
Week Eight: New England Patriots (6–1) at Buffalo Bills (5–2)

Quarter	1	2	3	4	Total
Patriots	3	0	10	0	**13**
**Bills**	0	14	0	17	**31**

at Rich Stadium, Orchard Park, New York

- Date: October 26
- Game time: 1:00 p.m. EDT
- Game weather: 41 °F (5 °C)
- Game attendance: 75,092
- Referee: Ben Dreith
- TV announcers (NBC): Charlie Jones and Len Dawson
- Box Score

Game information

**First quarter**

- NE – John Smith 41-yard field goal. Patriots 3–0.

**Second quarter**

- BUF – Frank Lewis 14-yard pass from Joe Ferguson (Nick Mike-Mayer kick). Bills 7–3.
- BUF – Frank Lewis 12-yard pass from Joe Ferguson (Nick Mike-Mayer kick). Bills 14–3.

**Third quarter**

- NE – Russ Francis 26-yard pass from Steve Grogan (John Smith kick). Bills 14–10.
- NE – John Smith 32-yard field goal. Bills 14–13.

**Fourth quarter**

- BUF – Nick Mike-Mayer 23-yard field goal. Bills 17–13.
- BUF – Joe Cribbs 16-yard run (Nick Mike-Mayer kick). Bills 24–13.
- BUF – Joe Cribbs 5-yard run (Nick Mike-Mayer kick). Bills 31–13.

Top passers

- NE – Steve Grogan – 13/29, 138 yards, TD, 4 INT
- BUF – Joe Ferguson – 12/28, 176 yards, 2 TD, 2 INT

Top rushers

- NE – Don Calhoun – 8 rushes, 24 yards
- BUF – Joe Cribbs – 30 rushes, 118 yards, 2 TD

Top receivers

- NE – Russ Francis – 2 receptions, 32 yards, TD
- BUF – Frank Lewis – 5 receptions, 80 yards, 2 TD

==== Week 9 ====
Team	1	2	3	4	Total
• Falcons	0	10	10	10	30
Bills	7	7	0	0	14

- Date: November 2
- Location: Rich Stadium, Orchard Park, New York
- Game start: 1:00 p.m.
- Game weather: 40 °F or 4.4 °C, wind 9 miles per hour (14 km/h; 7.8 kn)
- Referee: Chuck Heberling
- TV announcers (CBS): Dick Stockton and Jim Hill

==== Week 10 ====
Team	1	2	3	4	Total
• Bills	10	7	7	7	31
Jets	0	10	0	14	24

- Date: November 9
- Location: Shea Stadium, Flushing, New York
- Game start: 4:00 p.m.
- Game weather: 44 °F or 6.7 °C, wind 12 miles per hour (19 km/h; 10 kn)
- Television network: NBC

==== Week 11 ====
Team	1	2	3	4	Total
• Bills	0	7	0	7	14
Bengals	0	0	0	0	0

- Date: November 16
- Location: Riverfront Stadium, Cincinnati
- Game start: 1:00 p.m.
- Game weather: 34 °F or 1.1 °C, wind 11 miles per hour (18 km/h; 9.6 kn)

==== Week 12 ====
Team	1	2	3	4	Total
Steelers	7	3	0	3	13
• Bills	7	7	7	7	28

- Date: November 23
- Location: Rich Stadium, Orchard Park, New York
- Game start: 1:00 p.m.
- Game weather: 41 °F or 5 °C, wind 10 miles per hour (16 km/h; 8.7 kn)

==== Week 13 ====
Team	1	2	3	4	Total
Bills	7	7	3	7	24
• Colts	0	14	7	7	28

- Date: November 30
- Location: Memorial Stadium, Baltimore, Maryland
- Game start: 1:00 p.m.
- Game weather: 43 °F or 6.1 °C, wind 14 miles per hour (23 km/h; 12 kn)
- Referee: Jerry Markbreit
- TV announcers: NBC

==== Week 14 ====
Team	1	2	3	4	OT	Total
Rams	0	0	7	0	0	7
• Bills	0	0	7	0	3	10

- Date: December 7
- Location: Rich Stadium, Orchard Park, New York
- Game start: 1:00 p.m.
- Game weather: 43 °F or 6.1 °C, wind 9 miles per hour (14 km/h; 7.8 kn)
- Referee: Fred Silva
- TV announcers (CBS): Vin Scully and George Allen

First ever win for Buffalo vs Rams

==== Week 15 ====
Team	1	2	3	4	Total
Bills	0	0	2	0	2
• Patriots	7	7	7	3	24

- Date: December 14
- Location: Schaefer Stadium, Foxboro, Massachusetts
- Game start: 1:00 p.m.
- Game weather: 28 °F or −2.2 °C, wind 15 miles per hour (24 km/h; 13 kn)
- Referee: Cal Lepore
- TV announcers (NBC): Bob Costas and Gene Washington

==== Week 16 ====
Team	1	2	3	4	Total
• Bills	6	7	5	0	18
49ers	6	0	7	0	13

- Date: December 21
- Location: Candlestick Park, San Francisco, California
- Game start: 1:00 p.m.
- Game weather: 53 °F or 11.7 °C, wind 6 miles per hour (9.7 km/h; 5.2 kn)
- Referee: Ben Dreith
- TV announcers (NBC): Don Criqui and Mike Haffner

== Postseason ==
=== Divisional ===
Buffalo Bills at San Diego Chargers

Team	1	2	3	4	Total
Bills	0	14	0	0	14
• Chargers	3	0	7	10	20

- Date: January 3
- Location: Jack Murphy Stadium, San Diego, California
- Game start: 4:00 p.m. EST
- Game attendance: 52,028
- Game weather: Sunny, 65 °F or 18.3 °C, wind 9 miles per hour (14 km/h; 7.8 kn)
- Referee: Gene Barth
- TV announcers (NBC): Dick Enberg and Merlin Olsen

With 2:08 left in the game, Chargers quarterback Dan Fouts threw the 50-yard winning touchdown pass to receiver Ron Smith to defeat the Bills, 20–14.

Wrote Paul Zimmerman in Sports Illustrated's 1981 NFL preview, "If Charley Romes intercepts the pass that bounces off his chest in the last few minutes of the playoff game against San Diego, then the Chargers don't score on the next play, and win the game. And Buffalo gets to play Oakland at home – where the Bills crushed the Raiders earlier in the season. And Buffalo's in the Super Bowl."

== Notable events ==
In Week 15, the Bills became the thirty-fourth team to score only a safety in a full game. It was the first occurrence of this since the San Diego Chargers against the Pittsburgh Steelers in the last game of the 1972 season, and there have been only three since, by the 1983 Minnesota Vikings, the 1993 Cincinnati Bengals, and the 2011 Atlanta Falcons in a playoff game.
