= 1980 Miami Dolphins season =

15th season in franchise history

- Head coach: Don Shula
- Home stadium: Orange Bowl

Results
- Record: 8–8
- Division place: 3rd AFC East
- Playoffs: Did not qualify
- Pro Bowlers: None

The 1980 Miami Dolphins season was the 15th year of existence for the Miami Dolphins franchise. Quarterback Bob Griese retired after the season, following a 14-year career with the Dolphins. However, in Griese's final season the Dolphins would only play mediocre football finishing in third place with an 8–8 record. This was also the first season since 1969 that the Dolphins lost to the Buffalo Bills. For the season, the Dolphins switched the color of the facemasks on their helmets from gray to teal.

No Dolphins made it to the Pro Bowl for the second consecutive season. Griese was the highest-paid quarterback in the league at just over $400,000.

== Offseason ==
=== NFL draft ===
1980 Miami Dolphins draft
Round	Pick	Player	Position	College	Notes
1	21	Don McNeal	Cornerback	Alabama	
2	48	Dwight Stephenson * ^{†}	Center	Alabama	
3	75	Bill Barnett	Defensive end	Nebraska	
4	100	Elmer Bailey	Wide receiver	Minnesota	
6	158	Eugene Byrd	Wide receiver	Michigan State	
7	185	Joe Rose	Tight end	California	
8	212	Jeff Allen	Defensive back	UC Davis	
8	214	David Woodley	Quarterback	LSU	
9	239	Mark Goodspeed	Offensive tackle	Nebraska	
10	271	Doug Lantz	Center	Miami (OH)	
10	272	Ben Long	Linebacker	South Dakota	
11	279	Phil Driscoll	Defensive end	Mankato State	
12	325	Chuck Stone	Guard	North Carolina State	
Made roster † Pro Football Hall of Fame * Made at least one Pro Bowl during career

== Personnel ==
=== Coaches / Staff ===
1980 Miami Dolphins staff
Front office: Team Owner / President – Joe Robbie; Executive Vice President/general manager – Mike Robbie; Vice president – Don Shula; Director of player personnel – Chuck Connor; Head coaches: Head coach – Don Shula; Offensive coaches: Quarterbacks/receivers – Dan Henning; Offensive backs – Carl Taseff; Offensive line/running game – John Sandusky	Defensive coaches: Assistant head coach/defense – Bill Arnsparger; Defensive line/run defense – Mike Scarry; Defensive backs – Tom Keane; Special teams coaches: Special teams – Steve Crosby, Carl Taseff; Punting – Tom Keane

=== Roster ===
1980 Miami Dolphins roster
Quarterbacks (QB): 10 Don Strock; 16 David Woodley; 17 Pete Woods; Running backs (RB): 34 Woody Bennett; 35 Nick Giaquinto; 38 Steve Howell; 31 Rick Moser; 22 Tony Nathan; 24 Delvin Williams; Wide receivers (WR): 88 Elmer Bailey; 81 Jimmy Cefalo; 82 Duriel Harris; 89 Nat Moore; Tight ends (TE): 84 Bruce Hardy; 86 Ronnie Lee; 80 Joe Rose	Offensive linemen (OL): 63 Mark Dennard C; 61 Thom Dornbrook G/C; 79 Jon Giesler T; 74 Cleveland Green T; 67 Bob Kuechenberg G; 68 Eric Laakso T; 64 Ed Newman G; 57 Dwight Stephenson C; Defensive linemen (DL): 78 Carl Barisich NT; 70 Bill Barnett DE; 73 Bob Baumhower NT; 75 Doug Betters DE; 83 Vern Den Herder DE	Linebackers (LB): 58 Kim Bokamper OLB; 51 Rusty Chambers ILB; 77 A. J. Duhe ILB; 50 Larry Gordon OLB; 54 Ralph Ortega ILB; 55 Earnie Rhone OLB; 59 Steve Shull ILB; Defensive backs (DB): 43 Jeff Allen CB; 46 Don Bessillieu FS; 47 Glenn Blackwood SS; 33 Billy Cesare FS; 25 Tim Foley SS; 48 Gerald Small CB; 45 Ed Taylor CB; Special teams (ST): 4 George Roberts P; 5 Uwe von Schamann K	Reserve: 44 Doug Beaudoin S (IR); 72 Phil Driscoll DE (IR); 12 Bob Griese QB (IR); 37 Mike Kozlowski S (IR); 66 Larry Little G (IR); 28 Don McNeal CB (IR); 38 Terry Robiskie RB (IR); 62 Don Sewell G (IR); 60 Jeff Toews G (IR); 56 Steve Towle LB (IR); Rookies in italics 45 active, 10 reserve

== Regular season ==
The 1980 NFL season would see the Dolphins drop to an 8–8 record, from their AFC East division winning 10–6 showing the previous year.

Quarterback Bob Griese, who struggled with leg problems during 1979, lost the starting job to longtime backup Don Strock, but he did poorly in two games, leading the Dolphins to return to Griese for week 3. In week 5, however, Griese suffered a career-ending shoulder injury against the Baltimore Colts and was succeeded by David Woodley, a rookie fresh from LSU.

Their week-1 loss to the Buffalo Bills was the Dolphins' first loss to that team since 1969, snapping a 20 game winning streak for Miami in the Bills-Dolphins rivalry. After the win, Bills fans rushed the field and tore down the goalposts. This was also Don Shula's first loss to Buffalo in 21 career games against them.

The final game of the season was played against the New York Jets on December 20. NBC tried a novel experiment by broadcasting the game with no commentators, and with none of the players or staff wearing microphones. The effect was to give television viewers the feel of actually being in the stadium. To date, this was the only NFL game ever aired on TV without commentaries. The Jets won by a score of 24–17, though both teams had already been eliminated from playoff contention.

It was during the ABC broadcast of the Monday Night Football game on December 8, 1980, against the Patriots that Howard Cosell announced that John Lennon had been shot and killed.

=== Schedule ===
Week	Date	Opponent	Result	Record	Venue	Attendance
1	September 7	at **Buffalo Bills**	**L** 7–17	0–1	Rich Stadium	79,598
2	September 14	Cincinnati Bengals	**W** 17–16	1–1	Miami Orange Bowl	38,322
3	September 21	at Atlanta Falcons	**W** 20–17	2–1	Atlanta–Fulton County Stadium	55,470
4	September 28	New Orleans Saints	**W** 21–16	3–1	Miami Orange Bowl	40,946
5	October 5	**Baltimore Colts**	**L** 17–30	3–2	Miami Orange Bowl	50,631
6	October 12	at **New England Patriots**	**L** 0–34	3–3	Schaefer Stadium	60,377
7	October 19	**Buffalo Bills**	**W** 17–14	4–3	Miami Orange Bowl	41,636
8	October 27	at **New York Jets**	**L** 14–17	4–4	Shea Stadium	53,046
9	November 2	at Oakland Raiders	**L** 10–16	4–5	Oakland–Alameda County Coliseum	46,378
10	November 9	at Los Angeles Rams	**W** 35–14	5–5	Anaheim Stadium	62,198
11	November 16	San Francisco 49ers	**W** 17–13	6–5	Miami Orange Bowl	45,135
12	November 20	San Diego Chargers	**L** 24–27 (OT)	6–6	Miami Orange Bowl	63,013
13	November 30	at Pittsburgh Steelers	**L** 10–23	6–7	Three Rivers Stadium	51,384
14	December 8	**New England Patriots**	**W** 16–13 (OT)	7–7	Miami Orange Bowl	63,292
15	December 14	at **Baltimore Colts**	**W** 24–14	8–7	Memorial Stadium	30,564
16	December 20	**New York Jets**	**L** 17–24	8–8	Miami Orange Bowl	41,854
Note: Intra-division opponents are in **bold** text.

=== Game summaries ===
==== Week 1 at Bills ====
Week One: Miami Dolphins (0–0) at Buffalo Bills (0–0)

Quarter	1	2	3	4	Total
Dolphins	0	0	7	0	**7**
**Bills**	0	3	0	14	**17**

at Rich Stadium, Orchard Park, New York

- Date: September 7
- Game time: 1:00 p.m. EDT
- Game weather: 64 °F (18 °C)
- Game attendance: 79,598
- Referee: Gordon McCarter
- TV announcers (NBC): Bob Costas and Mike Haffner
- Box Score

Game information

First quarter

- No scoring

Second quarter

- BUF – Nick Mike-Mayer 40-yard field goal. Bills 3–0.

Third quarter

- MIA – Tony Nathan 4-yard pass from Bob Griese (Uwe von Schamann kick). Dolphins 7–3.

Fourth quarter

- BUF – Roosevelt Leaks 4-yard pass from Joe Ferguson (Nick Mike-Mayer kick). Bills 10–7.
- BUF – Joe Cribbs 2-yard run (Nick Mike-Mayer kick). Bills 17–7.

Top passers

- MIA – Bob Griese – 11/18, 101 yards, TD, 2 INT
- BUF – Joe Ferguson – 20/32, 198 yards, TD, 5 INT

Top rushers

- MIA – Steve Howell – 6 rushes, 43 yards
- BUF – Joe Cribbs – 18 rushes, 60 yards, TD

Top receivers

- MIA – Duriel Harris – 3 receptions, 42 yards
- BUF – Joe Cribbs – 9 receptions, 71 yards

==== Week 7 vs Bills ====
Week Seven: Buffalo Bills (5–1) at Miami Dolphins (3–3)

Quarter	1	2	3	4	Total
Bills	0	0	7	7	**14**
**Dolphins**	7	7	3	0	**17**

at Orange Bowl, Miami, Florida

- Date: October 19
- Game time: 1:00 p.m. EDT
- Game weather: 80 °F (27 °C)
- Game attendance: 41,636
- Referee: Red Cashion
- TV announcers (NBC): Dick Enberg and Merlin Olsen
- Box Score

Game information

**First quarter**

- MIA – Don Bessillieu 44-yard fumble return (Uwe von Schamann kick). Dolphins 7–0.

**Second quarter**

- MIA – Nat Moore 3-yard pass from David Woodley (Uwe von Schamann kick). Dolphins 14–0.

**Third quarter**

- BUF – Joe Cribbs 2-yard run (Nick Mike-Mayer kick). Dolphins 14–7.
- MIA – Uwe von Schamann 23-yard field goal. Dolphins 17–7.

**Fourth quarter**

- BUF – Jerry Butler 7-yard pass from Joe Ferguson (Nick Mike-Mayer kick). Dolphins 17–14.

Top passers

- BUF – Joe Ferguson – 24/42, 221 yards, TD
- MIA – David Woodley – 11/17, 93 yards, TD, INT

Top rushers

- BUF – Joe Cribbs – 14 rushes, 38 yards, TD
- MIA – Terry Robiskie – 18 rushes, 84 yards

Top receivers

- BUF – Frank Lewis – 4 receptions, 71 yards
- MIA – Nat Moore – 4 receptions, 39 yards, TD

==== Week 14: vs. New England Patriots ====
New England Patriots at Miami Dolphins

Team	1	2	3	4	OT	Total
Patriots	0	6	0	7	0	13
• **Dolphins**	0	0	6	7	3	16

- Date: December 8
- Location: Orange Bowl, Miami, Florida
- Game start: 9:00 p.m. EST
- Referee: Jerry Seeman
- Television network: ABC
- Source: Pro-Football-Reference.com

Scoring summary
2	Patriots	John Smith 23-yard field goal	Patriots 3–0
2	Patriots	John Smith 33-yard field goal	Patriots 6–0
3	Dolphins	Uwe von Schamann 27-yard field goal	Patriots 6–3
3	Dolphins	Uwe von Schamann 24-yard field goal	Tie 6–6
4	Patriots	Russ Francis 38-yard pass from Matt Cavanaugh (John Smith kick)	Patriots 13–6
4	Dolphins	Nat Moore 8-yard pass from David Woodley (Uwe von Schamann kick)	Tie 13–13
OT	Dolphins	Uwe von Schamann 23-yard field goal	Dolphins 16–13

The Dolphins got revenge from their 34-0 shellacking in Foxborough back in October. The Patriots clawed to a 13–6 lead in the fourth quarter, then the Dolphins forced overtime with a David Woodley throw to Nat Moore in the fourth. John Smith attempted to kick the game-winning field goal, but had the kick blocked, then Uwe von Schamann of the Dolphins won it with a 23-yard field goal in the extra quarter. The game, though, became overshadowed by Howard Cosell's announcement that John Lennon had been shot and killed.

=== Standings ===
AFC East
	W	L	T	PCT	DIV	CONF	PF	PA	STK
^{(3)} Buffalo Bills	11	5	0	.688	4–4	8–4	320	260	W1
New England Patriots	10	6	0	.625	6–2	9–3	441	325	W2
Miami Dolphins	8	8	0	.500	3–5	4–8	266	305	L1
Baltimore Colts	7	9	0	.438	5–3	6–8	355	387	L3
New York Jets	4	12	0	.250	2–6	3–9	302	395	W1
