= Chris Keating (disambiguation) =

Chris Keating is an American football player.

Chris Keating may also refer to:

- Chris Keating (musician), member of Yeasayer
- Chris Keating, winner of Bundoora Football Club's League Best & Fairest in 1990 and 1992
