= Greg Cater =

American football player (born 1957)

No. 7, 14
- Position: Punter

Personal information
- Born: April 17, 1957 (age 69); LaGrange, Georgia, U.S.
- Listed height: 6 ft 1 in (1.85 m)
- Listed weight: 191 lb (87 kg)

Career information
- High school: LaGrange
- College: Chattanooga
- NFL draft: 1980: 10th round, 259th overall pick

Career history
- Buffalo Bills (1980–1983); Orlando Renegades (1985); St. Louis Cardinals (1986–1987)

Career NFL statistics
- Punts: 377
- Punting yards: 14,605
- Average: 38.7
- Stats at Pro Football Reference

Gregory Allen Cater (born April 17, 1957) is an American former professional football player who was a punter in the National Football League (NFL) for the Buffalo Bills and St. Louis Cardinals, appearing in a total of 77 career games. He played college football for the Chattanooga Mocs

== NFL career statistics ==
Legend
**Bold**	Career high

=== Regular season ===
Year	Team	Punting									
Year	Team	GP	Punts	Yds	Net Yds	Lng	Avg	Net Avg	Blk	Ins20	TB
1980	BUF	**16**	73	2,828	2,304	61	38.7	31.1	**1**	12	**16**
1981	BUF	**16**	80	3,175	2,715	**71**	**39.7**	33.9	0	16	12
1982	BUF	9	35	1,328	1,278	61	37.9	**36.5**	0	13	1
1983	BUF	**16**	**89**	**3,533**	**2,990**	60	**39.7**	33.6	0	**24**	7
1986	STL	11	61	2,271	2,061	52	37.2	33.2	**1**	16	4
1987	STL	9	39	1,470	1,226	68	37.7	30.7	**1**	10	2
Career		77	377	14,605	12,574	71	38.7	33.1	3	91	42

=== Playoffs ===
Year	Team	Punting									
Year	Team	GP	Punts	Yds	Net Yds	Lng	Avg	Net Avg	Blk	Ins20	TB
1980	BUF	1	6	267	198	**55**	**44.5**	33.0	0	0	**2**
1981	BUF	**2**	**7**	**301**	**243**	50	43.0	**34.7**	0	0	0
Career		3	13	568	441	55	43.7	33.9	0	0	2
