= Joe Cribbs =

American football player (born 1958)

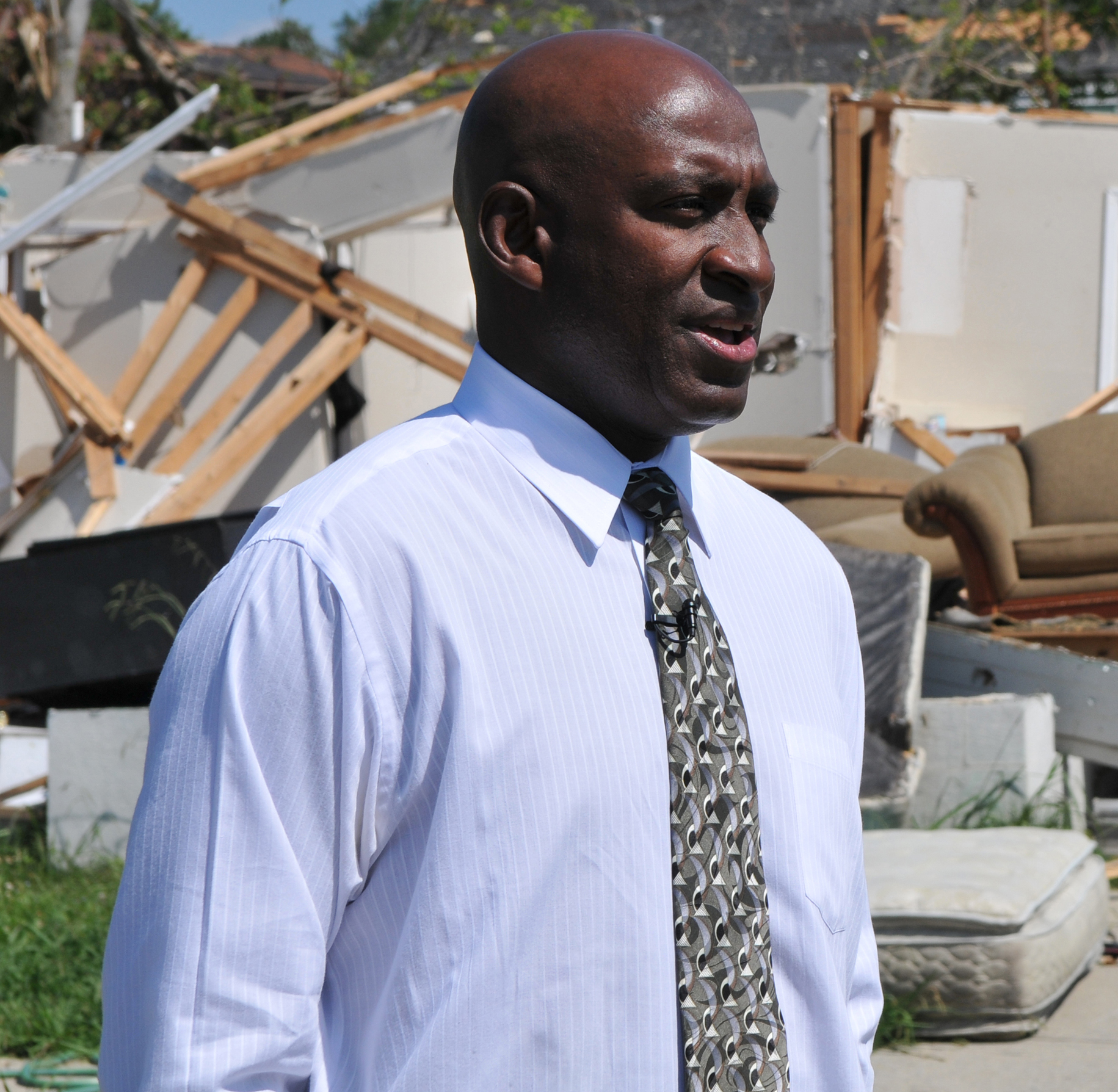
- Cribbs in 2011

No. 20, 28, 30
- Position: Running back

Personal information
- Born: January 5, 1958 (age 68); Sulligent, Alabama, U.S.
- Listed height: 5 ft 11 in (1.80 m)
- Listed weight: 190 lb (86 kg)

Career information
- High school: Sulligent
- College: Auburn
- NFL draft: 1980: 2nd round, 29th overall pick

Career history
- Buffalo Bills (1980–1983); Birmingham Stallions (1984–1985); Buffalo Bills (1985); San Francisco 49ers (1986–1987); Indianapolis Colts (1988); Miami Dolphins (1988)

Awards and highlights
- 3× Pro Bowl (1980, 1981, 1983); PFWA All-Rookie Team (1980); All-USFL (1984); Third-team All-American (1979); SEC Player of the Year (1979); 2× First-team All-SEC (1978, 1979)

Career NFL statistics
- Rushing yards: 5,356
- Rushing average: 4.1
- Rushing touchdowns: 27
- Stats at Pro Football Reference

Joe Stanier Cribbs (born January 5, 1958) is an American former professional football player who was a running back in the National Football League (NFL) and United States Football League (USFL). He played college football at Auburn University along with future NFL backs William Andrews and James Brooks. He began his professional career in 1980 with the Buffalo Bills.

After being drafted in the second round of the 1980 NFL draft, Cribbs went on to start all 16 games of his rookie year with Buffalo, finishing with 1185 rushing yards and 11 touchdowns. His performance earned him consensus UPI AFC Rookie of the Year honors and a spot in the Pro Bowl, the only rookie chosen as a starter that year. In five seasons with the team, split around a detour with the USFL, Cribbs had 13 100-yard games and ran for 1,000 yards in a season three times.

In the spring of 1984, Cribbs left the Bills in a contract dispute and signed on as a member of the Birmingham Stallions of the United States Football League (USFL). His nephew is former wide receiver Josh Cribbs.

Cribbs was to serve as the president of Team Alabama of the AAFL, which suspended operations shortly before it was slated to play its first games. Almost immediately, Cribbs was named commissioner of the United National Gridiron League, which likewise failed ever to play a game.

== College career ==
Joe Cribbs played college football at Auburn. He played his first college football game in 1976, and when the season was over, he had 171 yards on 43 rushing attempts. He got more playing time in 1977, with 872 yards on 161 rushing attempts. He scored four touchdowns as a rusher. He also caught six passes for 51 yards.

1978 was the breakout year. Cribbs rushed for 1,205 yards in 253 attempts, scoring 16 touchdowns, and averaging well over hundred yards a game. He was a threat out of the backfield as well, catching right passes. He was also used on gadget plays as well. Cribbs passed the ball four times, completing three passes for 74 yards.

In 1979, Cribbs final season at Auburn, Cribbs had 200 rushing attempts for 1,120 yards, and scored 14 touchdowns rushing

== Buffalo Bills career and lawsuit ==
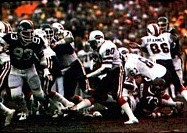
Cribbs (middle) rushes the ball for the Bills against the Jets in the 1981 AFC wild card game.

Cribbs was an immediate success playing for the NFL team which drafted him, the Buffalo Bills, and was named the American Football Conference Rookie of the Year for the 1980 season and as a starter in the Pro Bowl. On September 7, 1980, Cribbs contributed 131 combined yards of offense as the Bills would snap a 20-game losing streak versus the Dolphins, winning in a 17–7 final. He also played very well in each of the two subsequent seasons and was named to the Pro Bowl again following each. When the NFL played an abbreviated 9 game schedule due to the strike-shortened season in 1982, Cribbs was only able to play in 7 games but nonetheless led the league with 90.4 rushing yards per game. Cribbs was not exactly happy in Buffalo, however, as he especially disliked playing in their infamous cold-weather home games. With one year left on his contract with the Bills, Cribbs signed a contract with the Birmingham Stallions of the USFL. In the summer of 1983, Cribbs officially inked a contract with Birmingham worth $3.5 million.

However, the Bills challenged the contract, citing that they had first right of refusal. This clause had been in Cribbs' original contract with the Buffalo Bills. This was placed in the contract in order to protect Buffalo in case there was no collective bargaining agreement and to prevent another NFL team from signing Cribbs in that event. However, obviously there was no mention of a prohibition of any team from the USFL signing Cribbs, as that league was yet to be formed when Cribbs signed his contract with the Bills.

The trial was held in Buffalo, and one of the people testifying for the Bills was head coach Kay Stephenson, who stated that Joe Cribbs was irreplaceable in the Bills lineup. Federal Judge John T. Elfvin heard the case. While the trial was going on, Cribbs continued to work out with the Stallions. When the verdict came down, Judge Elfvin ruled in favor of Cribbs, allowing him to play for the Birmingham Stallions.

== USFL and contract dispute in Birmingham ==
Herschel Walker made the jump from college football to the USFL, becoming the league's highest paid player at $6 million over four years. This played a factor in Joe Cribbs walking out of his contract with the Birmingham Stallions. Cribbs had signed a deal in 1983 worth $2.6 million to play for Birmingham, and still five years left on the contract. At the time of his walkout, Cribbs was leading the USFL in rushing.

== Later career ==
Cribbs was a fairly major star with the Stallions; however, the USFL folded after its 1985 season and Cribbs then returned to play in the NFL. Cribbs played for the San Francisco 49ers in the 1986 and 1987 seasons. He then divided the 1988 season between the Indianapolis Colts and the Miami Dolphins prior to his retirement. During this return stint in the NFL, Cribbs never came truly close to the level of consistency which had put him into three consecutive Pro Bowls early in the decade.

== NFL career statistics ==
Legend
	Led the league
**Bold**	Career high

=== Regular season ===
Year	Team	Games		Rushing						Receiving					Fumbles	
Year	Team	GP	GS	Att	Yds	Avg	Y/G	Lng	TD	Rec	Yds	Avg	Lng	TD	Fum	FR
1980	BUF	16	16	**306**	**1,185**	3.9	74.1	48	**11**	52	415	8.0	21	1	**16**	1
1981	BUF	15	15	257	1,097	4.3	73.1	35	3	40	**603**	**15.1**	**65**	**7**	12	1
1982	BUF	7	6	134	633	**4.7**	**90.4**	**62**	3	13	99	7.6	31	0	5	**2**
1983	BUF	16	16	263	1,131	4.3	70.7	45	3	**57**	524	9.2	33	**7**	6	1
1984	BUF	Sat out due to contract dispute														
1985	BUF	10	5	122	399	3.3	39.9	16	1	18	142	7.9	23	0	5	1
1986	SF	14	10	152	590	3.9	42.1	19	5	35	346	9.9	33	0	5	1
1987	SF	11	3	70	300	4.3	27.3	20	1	9	70	7.8	16	0	1	0
1988	IND	1	0	Did not record any stats												
1988	MIA	12	0	5	21	4.2	1.8	11	0	–	–	–	–	–	1	0
Career		102	71	1,309	5,356	4.1	52.5	62	27	224	2,199	9.8	65	15	51	7
