= Joe Ferguson =

American football player (born 1950)

No. 12
- Position: Quarterback

Personal information
- Born: April 23, 1950 (age 76); Alvin, Texas, U.S.
- Listed height: 6 ft 1 in (1.85 m)
- Listed weight: 195 lb (88 kg)

Career information
- High school: Woodlawn (Shreveport, Louisiana)
- College: Arkansas (1969–1972)
- NFL draft: 1973: 3rd round, 57th overall pick

Career history
- Buffalo Bills (1973–1984); Detroit Lions (1985–1987); Tampa Bay Buccaneers (1988–1989); Indianapolis Colts (1990)

Awards and highlights
- NFL passing yards leader (1977); NFL passing touchdowns leader (1975); Buffalo Bills Wall of Fame; First-team All-SWC (1971)

Career NFL statistics
- Passing attempts: 4,519
- Passing completions: 2,369
- Completion percentage: 52.4%
- TD–INT: 196–209
- Passing yards: 29,817
- Passer rating: 68.4
- Stats at Pro Football Reference

Joseph Carlton Ferguson Jr. (born April 23, 1950) is an American former professional football player who was a quarterback for 17 seasons in the National Football League (NFL), primarily with the Buffalo Bills. He played college football for the Arkansas Razorbacks and was selected by the Bills in the third round of the 1973 NFL draft.

== Early life ==
Ferguson played high school football in Shreveport, Louisiana, for Woodlawn High School. He guided the Knights to the Louisiana High School Athletic Association Class AAA (the top classification at the time) state championship in 1968. Ferguson succeeded Terry Bradshaw as Woodlawn's starting quarterback.

Ferguson played college football at the University of Arkansas, where he held the school's single game record for most completions until broken in 2012 (31 against Texas A&M in 1971). He was the MVP of the 1971 Liberty Bowl.

== Professional career ==
The Buffalo Bills selected Ferguson 57th overall in the third round of the 1973 NFL draft. Ferguson was drafted in 1973 by the Bills to a team led by fourth-year running back O. J. Simpson that had third-year Dennis Shaw as starting quarterback. In the quarterback competition between Shaw and Ferguson, the latter won the right to start as QB to start the year, albeit on a limited basis for the first game on September 16 against the New England Patriots. Ferguson threw a total of two passes and was sacked once to go along with a dubious reception for -3 yards on a pass from Simpson before Shaw took over (he proceeded to throw nine passes while Simpson proceeded to run for 250 yards in the 31–13 win). Ferguson and Shaw threw nearly the same number of passes in the second game against the Chargers and each were picked off twice in the 34–7 loss. Finally, in the third game of the season against the New York Jets, Ferguson was the primary quarterback for the whole game, and he went 7-of-17 for 74 yards with an interception as the Bills narrowly won 9–6 on the strength of three field goals. Simpson dominated the year with a historic season as the first 2,000-yard rusher for the Bills while Ferguson threw for 939 yards with four touchdowns to 10 interceptions with a passer rating of 45.8. Ferguson's best game in yards that season was against the Baltimore Colts when he threw for 201 yards (his only game of the year above 100 yards) on 11-of-19 with a touchdown and an interception. Ferguson improved in his second season, for the most part. In fourteen starts, he threw for 1,588 yards on 12 touchdowns to 12 interceptions that saw him sacked 32 times and have a passer rating of 69. He had two 3-TD games to go along with two games where he threw less than ten passes (in the Week 3 game versus the Jets, he was 0-for-2 the whole game) and won each of them on the strength of their running attack. The Bills reached the postseason that season as a Wild Card. Facing the Pittsburgh Steelers, Ferguson gave the Bills an early lead on his touchdown pass to Paul Seymour before Pittsburgh rattled off 26 straight points in the second quarter on their way to an eventual 32–14 victory. Ferguson went 11-of-26 for 164 yards with two touchdowns in the loss.

The 1975 season saw Ferguson throw for 2,426 yards with a league-leading 25 touchdowns (tied with Fran Tarkenton) to 17 interceptions with a passing rating of 81.3 while being sacked 20 times. The miserable 1976 season saw Ferguson miss out on the last seven games of the season due to a back injury that resulted in Gary Marangi taking over for a team that finished the year on a ten-game losing streak to finish 2–12. For Ferguson's part, he threw for 1,086 yards in seven games with 9 touchdowns to one interception. The 1977 season saw Ferguson start all fourteen games. He threw for 2,803 yards with 12 touchdowns to 24 interceptions with a passer rating of 54.8 with 36 sacks; he led the league in passing attempts (457), yards, interceptions, and yards per game (200.2). The Bills began anew with Chuck Knox as head coach and no Simpson on the roster. The team went 5−11 while Ferguson threw for 2,136 yards with 16 touchdowns to 15 interceptions, although Ferguson had the longest pass of the season and in his career with a 92-yard pass. Ferguson had his first 3,000-yard season in 1979, throwing for 3,572 yards with 14 touchdowns to 15 interceptions with a passer rating of 74.4 while being sacked 43 times. The 1980 team finally reached the postseason again by going 11−5, and Ferguson threw for 2,805 yards with 20 touchdowns to 18 interceptions with a passer rating of 74.5; the last two weeks saw him play on a sprained ankle. The Bills were matched against the San Diego Chargers in the Divisional Round, and Ferguson reinjured his sprained left ankle early in the game. He threw 15-of-29 for 180 yards with a touchdown to three interceptions while being sacked three times in a game where Buffalo led until the final two minutes and Ferguson's last pass was intercepted with the Bills nearly at midfield. The Bills made the postseason in back-to-back seasons with a 1981 season that saw Ferguson throw for a career-high 3,652 yards (and 228.3 yards per game) with 24 touchdowns to 20 interceptions while being sacked just 15 times.

In the Wild Card game against the Jets, Ferguson went 17-of-34 for 268 yards while throwing two touchdowns and four interceptions as the Bills narrowly pulled off a 31–27 victory. In the Divisional Round game versus the Cincinnati Bengals, Cincinnati held an early 14–0 lead and never trailed while Ferguson threw 15-of-31 for 202 yards with a touchdown and two interceptions (both in the first half) as Buffalo could only get to the Cincinnati 20 before a would-be completion moved them back five yards on their way to turning the ball over on downs. The strike-shortened 1982 season saw the Bills run the ball heavily and miss out on the playoffs with a record of 4−5 while Ferguson threw for 1,597 yards with seven touchdowns to a league-leading 16 interceptions. The 1983 season was the last time Ferguson would start all games of a season (with the team going 3–6 after starting 5–2), and he threw for 2,995 yards with career highs in touchdowns (26) and interceptions (25). In Ferguson's final season as a Bill in 1984, the team went 1−10 (which saw him suffer an ankle injury four weeks into the season) while he threw for 1,991 yards in twelve games with 12 touchdowns to 17 interceptions.

On April 30, 1985, Ferguson was traded to the Detroit Lions. It was noted at the time that Ferguson was among the top 20 in pass attempts, completions, yards, and touchdowns. He ended up as second-string to Eric Hipple, starting only the finale against Chicago and throwing a total of 54 passes for the whole year.

Ferguson started four games for the Lions in 1986 and played in two others, throwing a total of 941 yards with seven touchdowns and interceptions. After going unsigned in 1987, he was signed in 1988 to serve as backup to the Tampa Bay Buccaneers where he had three starts in two seasons. He then signed with the Indianapolis Colts in 1990 and threw a total of eight passes (two intercepted).

Ferguson described himself as "just an easy-going country boy that sometimes gets fired up". Ferguson was the fifth player to wear number 12 with the Bills. The next player to wear it would be Hall of Famer Jim Kelly, who ultimately had the number retired in his honor.

In 1995, Ferguson briefly came out of retirement to serve as a backup quarterback for the San Antonio Texans of the Canadian Football League's South Division. Kay Stephenson, who had coached Ferguson in his last year in Buffalo, was coach of San Antonio at the time and needed an inexpensive backup who knew Stephenson's system after starter David Archer was injured midseason.

He finished his career with 196 touchdowns thrown and 209 interceptions. Ferguson placed in the top 10 in pass attempts five times, completions and passing yards four times, passing touchdowns six times, and yards per pass three times. At one time he shared, with Ron Jaworski, the NFL record for consecutive starts by a quarterback with 107, until he was replaced by Joe Dufek on September 30, 1984. Apparently, Ferguson was the inspiration for the Bills changing their helmet color beginning in 1984, as his colorblindness playing in a division with several white helmets supposedly was behind his penchant for interceptions, particularly in his final seasons with Buffalo.

== NFL career statistics ==
Legend
	Led the league
**Bold**	Career high

=== Regular season ===
Year	Team	Games			Passing												Sacks			Drives	
Year	Team	GP	GS	Record	Cmp	Att	Pct	Yds	TD	TD%	Int	Int%	Lng	Y/A	Y/G	Rtg	Sck	SckY	Sck%	4QC	GWD
1973	BUF	14	14	9−5	73	164	44.5	939	4	2.4	10	6.1	42	5.7	67.1	45.8	20	164	10.9	2	1
1974	BUF	14	14	9−5	119	232	51.3	1,588	12	5.2	12	5.2	55	6.8	113.4	69.0	32	235	**12.1**	**3**	3
1975	BUF	14	14	8−6	169	321	52.6	2,426	25	**7.8**	17	7.6	77	7.6	173.3	81.3	20	153	5.9	1	3
1976	BUF	7	7	2−5	74	151	49.0	1,086	9	6.0	1	0.7	58	7.2	155.1	90.0	11	80	6.8	1	1
1977	BUF	14	14	3−11	221	457	48.4	2,803	12	2.6	24	5.3	42	6.1	200.2	54.2	36	273	7.3	1	1
1978	BUF	16	16	5−11	175	330	53.0	2,136	16	4.8	15	4.5	**92**	6.5	133.5	70.5	29	243	8.1	1	1
1979	BUF	16	16	7−9	238	458	52.0	3,572	14	3.1	15	3.3	84	7.8	223.3	74.4	**43**	**387**	8.6	2	3
1980	BUF	16	16	**11−5**	251	439	57.2	2,805	20	4.6	18	4.1	69	6.4	175.3	74.5	13	129	2.9	2	**4**
1981	BUF	16	16	10−6	252	498	50.6	**3,652**	24	4.8	20	4.0	67	7.3	**228.3**	74.1	15	137	2.9	2	2
1982	BUF	9	9	4−5	144	264	54.5	1,597	7	2.7	16	6.1	47	6.0	177.4	56.3	11	105	4.0	1	1
1983	BUF	16	16	8−8	**281**	**508**	55.3	2,995	**26**	5.1	**25**	4.9	43	5.9	187.2	69.3	27	266	5.0	**3**	3
1984	BUF	12	11	1−10	191	344	55.5	1,991	12	3.5	17	4.9	68	5.8	165.9	63.5	35	357	9.2	—	—
1985	DET	8	1	0−1	31	54	57.4	364	2	3.7	3	5.6	38	6.7	45.5	67.2	4	35	6.9	—	—
1986	DET	6	4	2−2	73	155	47.1	941	7	4.5	7	4.5	73	6.1	156.8	62.9	10	101	6.1	1	1
1988	TB	2	1	0−1	31	46	**67.4**	368	3	6.5	1	2.2	34	**8.0**	184.0	**104.3**	1	8	2.1	—	—
1989	TB	5	2	0−2	44	90	48.9	533	3	3.3	6	6.7	69	5.9	106.6	50.8	5	37	5.3	—	—
1990	IND	1	0	0−0	2	8	25.0	21	0	0.0	2	**25.0**	13	2.6	21.0	0.0	0	0	0.0	—	—
Career		186	171	79−92	2,369	4,519	52.4	29,817	196	4.3	209	4.6	92	6.6	160.3	68.4	312	2,710	6.5	20	24

=== Buffalo Bills franchise records ===
- Highest touchdown percentage in a single season – 7.8 (1975)
- Lowest interception percentage in a single season – 0.7 (1976)
- Most sack yards lost in a single season – 387 (1979)
- Most interceptions thrown in a career – 190
- Most sack yards lost in a career – 2,529

== Personal life ==
In May 2005, Ferguson was diagnosed with Burkitt's lymphoma cancer and underwent treatment at The University of Texas M. D. Anderson Cancer Center in Houston, Texas. In January 2008, Ferguson was diagnosed with acute myeloid leukemia. In February 2008, he was treated at M.D. Anderson in the intensive care unit for pneumonia. In July 2009, it was reported that Ferguson had recovered from his battles with cancer.
