= Nick Mike-Mayer =

Italian gridiron football player (born 1950)

No. 12, 1, 5
- Position: Kicker

Personal information
- Born: March 1, 1950 (age 76); Bologna, Italy
- Listed height: 5 ft 8 in (1.73 m)
- Listed weight: 186 lb (84 kg)

Career information
- High school: Passaic (NJ)
- College: Temple
- NFL draft: 1973: 10th round, 248th overall pick

Career history
- Atlanta Falcons (1973–1977); Philadelphia Eagles (1977–1978); Buffalo Bills (1979–1982); San Antonio Gunslingers (1984–1985); Chicago Bruisers (1987); Los Angeles Cobras (1988)

Awards and highlights
- Pro Bowl (1973); First-team All-Arena (1987)

Career NFL statistics
- Field goals attempted: 204
- Field goals made: 115
- Field goal %: 56.4
- Stats at Pro Football Reference

Nicholas Mike-Mayer (MICK-ə-myur; born March 1, 1950) is an American former professional football player who was a kicker in the National Football League (NFL) from 1973 to 1982 for the Atlanta Falcons, Philadelphia Eagles, and the Buffalo Bills. He made the Pro Bowl in his rookie year. He later played with the San Antonio Gunslingers of the United States Football League (USFL). His brother Steve Mike-Mayer also played in the NFL. Mike-Mayer would later go on to play in the Arena Football League (AFL) for the Chicago Bruisers and Los Angeles Cobras, earning All-Arena honors in 1987.

== Early life ==
Mike Mayer was born on March 1, 1950, in Bologna, Italy. Mike-Mayer's father had played soccer in Hungary and left with his family to escape Communism, ending up in Italy, where Mike-Mayer was born. The family emigrated to the United States in 1964, when Mike-Mayer was 14, and settled in Passaic, New Jersey, where he began to play sports at Passaic High School.

Mike-Mayer initially played on the soccer team, where he performed well, but he eventually volunteered to begin playing for the football team in his junior year, as they needed a kicker. Mike-Mayer's kicking eventually garnered the interest of the Temple Owls, who offered him a partial scholarship to play for them. He played for the team from 1970-73.

== Professional career ==
=== NFL draft ===
Mike-Mayer's kicking during his time with the Owls garnered the interest of the Atlanta Falcons, who ultimately chose to draft him in the 10th round of the 1973 NFL draft.

=== Atlanta Falcons ===
Mike-Mayer's rookie season was considered a great success. While the Falcons ultimately missed the playoffs with a 9-5 record, Mike-Mayer successfully made 26 of 38 field goal attempts, as well as all 34 extra-point attempts, which earned him a spot in the Pro Bowl as the starting kicker for the NFC team.

However, from 1974-77, Mike-Mayer's kicking began to regress, as he made only 56.3% of his field goals in 1974, and just 40% of his field goals in 1975.

Ultimately, Mike-Mayer was cut by the Falcons in 1977, after making just 36.8% of his field goal attempts in seven games.

=== Philadelphia Eagles ===
Mike-Mayer was picked up by the Philadelphia Eagles shortly after being cut by the Falcons, and he went on to finish the 1977 season with them, making all 3 of his field goal attempts, as well as all 7 of his extra-point attempts.

In 1978, Mike-Mayer would end up injured during a matchup against the Giants, who were up 17-12 near the end of the game. However, as Mike-Mayer sat on the sidelines, Giants quarterback Joe Pisarcik fumbled a handoff to Larry Csonka, and Eagles cornerback Herm Edwards took the ball and ran it 26 yards for the game-winning touchdown. Ultimately, Mike-Mayer finished the season with 8 of 17 field goal attempts made, as well 21 of 22 extra point attempts. After the end of the season, he was released by the Eagles.

=== Buffalo Bills ===
Upon Mike-Mayer being signed by the Bills to start the 1979 season, he had arguably his greatest season, making 20 of 29 field goal attempts, as well as 17 of 18 extra-point attempts. Through 1980-81, Mike-Mayer successfully made 27 of 47 field goal attempts, as well as 74 of 76 extra point attempts.

In 1982, the Bills drafted kicker Gary Anderson to compete with Mike-Mayer for a spot on the roster. Despite doing well during practice, Mike-Mayer was more impressive in the preseason, and the Bills chose to cut Anderson, who would go to Pittsburgh. Despite this, Mike-Mayer would play just 2 games, making just 1 of 4 field goal attempts and 4 of 5 extra point attempts, before being cut.

=== USFL/AFL ===
After being cut by the Bills, Mike-Mayer was signed by the USFL's San Antonio Gunslingers, where he would play for 2 seasons. However, the franchise collapsed after the end of Mike-Mayer's second season with them, becoming the only USFL team to have a franchise revoked due to money problems.

Mike-Mayer would then spend two years in the Arena Football League, before retiring from professional football.

== NFL career statistics ==
=== Regular season ===
General			Field goals				PATs		
Year	Team	GP	FGM	FGA	FG%	Lng	XPM	XPA	XP%
1973	ATL	14	26	38	68.4	52	34	34	100.0
1974	ATL	14	9	16	56.3	47	12	12	100.0
1975	ATL	14	4	10	40.0	44	30	33	90.9
1976	ATL	14	10	21	47.6	46	20	20	100.0
1977	ATL	7	7	19	36.8	44	7	7	100.0
1977	PHI	3	3	3	100.0	41	7	7	100.0
1978	PHI	12	8	17	47.1	39	21	22	95.5
1979	BUF	13	20	29	69.0	42	17	18	94.4
1980	BUF	16	13	23	56.5	49	37	39	94.9
1981	BUF	16	14	24	58.3	46	37	37	100.0
1982	BUF	2	1	4	25.0	21	4	5	80.0
Career		125	115	204	56.4	52	226	234	96.6

=== Postseason ===
General			Field goals				PATs		
Year	Team	GP	FGM	FGA	FG%	Lng	XPM	XPA	XP%
1980	BUF	1	0	2	0.0	-	2	2	100.0
1981	BUF	2	1	2	50.0	29	7	7	100.0
Career		3	1	4	25.0	29	9	9	100.0

== Personal life ==
Mike-Mayer had a brother, Steve, who also played in the NFL as a placekicker from 1975-80, for the San Francisco 49ers, New Orleans Saints, and Baltimore Colts.

After retiring from football, Mike-Mayer returned to San Antonio, where he was a special education teacher for 13 years, before buying his brother Steve's landscaping business, which he would go on to run for 6 years.
