= Darryl Caldwell =

American football player (born 1960)

No. 67
- Positions: Offensive lineman, tight end

Personal information
- Born: February 2, 1960 (age 66); Birmingham, Alabama, U.S.
- Listed height: 6 ft 5 in (1.96 m)
- Listed weight: 245 lb (111 kg)

Career information
- High school: Hayes (Birmingham)
- College: Tennessee State
- NFL draft: 1983: undrafted

Career history
- Buffalo Bills (1983); Memphis Showboats (1985)*; Buffalo Bills (1986)*; New York Jets (1987)
- * Offseason or practice squad member only
- Stats at Pro Football Reference

Darryl Dwayne Caldwell (born February 2, 1960) is an American former professional football player for the Buffalo Bills of the National Football League (NFL). He played college football for the Tennessee State Tigers.

== Early life ==
Darryl Dwayne Caldwell was born on February 2, 1960, in Birmingham, Alabama. He attended Hayes High School in Birmingham.

== College career ==
Caldwell enrolled at the University of Tennessee at Chattanooga to play college football for the Chattanooga Moccasins. He was a center as a freshman in 1978. In late October 1978, Caldwell was one of 20 black players who were indefinitely suspended by the team after walking out due to a disagreement with head coach Joe Morrison. Caldwell was a center/offensive tackle for the Moccasins in 1979.

Caldwell transferred to Tennessee State University and was a two-year letterman for the Tigers from 1981 to 1982. He was a blocking tight end while with the Tigers and caught "about 15 passes" total.

== Professional career ==
After going undrafted in the 1983 NFL draft, Caldwell signed with the Buffalo Bills on May 25. He played in 14 games for the Bills during the 1983 season, mainly as a reserve offensive lineman, and recovered one fumble. Due to injuries to Mark Brammer and Tony Hunter, he appeared in the regular season finale as a backup tight end. Caldwell missed two games due to a neck injury. He was released by the Bills on August 27, 1984, after the final game of the 1984 preseason.

On September 18, 1984, Caldwell signed with the Memphis Showboats of the United States Football League (USFL) for the 1985 USFL season. He was released on January 28, 1985, after suffering an injury.

Caldwell was signed by the Bills again on May 6, 1986. He was released on August 18, 1986, after the second preseason game.

Caldwell signed with the New York Jets on April 7, 1987. He was placed on injured reserve on August 31, 1987, where he spent the entire 1987 season. He was released with an injury settlement on August 8, 1988.
