= Frank Lewis (American football) =

American football player (born 1947)

No. 43, 82
- Position: Wide receiver

Personal information
- Born: July 4, 1947 (age 79); Houma, Louisiana, U.S.
- Listed height: 6 ft 1 in (1.85 m)
- Listed weight: 196 lb (89 kg)

Career information
- High school: Southdown (Houma)
- College: Grambling State
- NFL draft: 1971: 1st round, 8th overall pick

Career history
- Pittsburgh Steelers (1971–1977); Buffalo Bills (1978–1983)

Awards and highlights
- 2× Super Bowl champion (IX, X); Pro Bowl (1981); Second-team Little All-American (1969); Third-team Little All-American (1970)

Career NFL statistics
- Receptions: 397
- Receiving yards: 6,724
- Receiving touchdowns: 40
- Stats at Pro Football Reference

Frank Douglas Lewis (born July 4, 1947) is an American former professional football player who was a wide receiver for 13 seasons with the Pittsburgh Steelers and Buffalo Bills in the National Football League (NFL).

Lewis played college football for the Grambling State Tigers and received third-team honors on the 1970 Little All-America college football team.

He was drafted eighth overall by the Steelers in the first round of the 1971 NFL draft. He won two Super Bowl rings with the team, in Super Bowl IX and Super Bowl X.

In August 1978 the Steelers traded Lewis to the Bills in exchange for tight end Paul Seymour. Seymour was returned by the Steelers when he failed to pass their physical. Lewis, however, remained with the Bills and the Steelers ended up receiving no compensation in the trade.

Lewis was a Pro Bowl selection in 1981 as a member of the Bills. In his pro career, he caught 397 receptions for 6,724 yards and 40 touchdowns.

In 2019, Lewis was elected to the 10th class of the Black College Football Hall of Fame. As a star player at Grambling State in the Southwestern Athletic Conference, he helped the university win the conference championship in 1968. He scored 42 total touchdowns, both receiving and rushing, during his four years there before becoming a first-round draft pick.

== NFL career statistics ==
Legend
	Won the Super Bowl
	Led the league
**Bold**	Career high

=== Regular season ===
Year	Team	Games		Receiving				
Year	Team	GP	GS	Rec	Yds	Avg	Lng	TD
1971	PIT	9	0	3	44	14.7	22	0
1972	PIT	13	8	27	391	14.5	52	5
1973	PIT	9	5	23	409	17.8	53	3
1974	PIT	12	11	30	365	12.2	31	4
1975	PIT	10	4	17	308	18.1	40	2
1976	PIT	12	12	17	306	18.0	64	1
1977	PIT	10	0	11	263	**23.9**	65	1
1978	BUF	15	15	41	735	17.9	**92**	**7**
1979	BUF	15	15	54	1,082	20.0	55	2
1980	BUF	15	13	40	648	16.2	31	6
1981	BUF	**16**	**16**	**70**	**1,244**	17.8	33	4
1982	BUF	8	8	28	443	15.8	39	2
1983	BUF	11	11	36	486	13.5	27	3
		155	118	397	6,724	16.9	92	40

=== Playoffs ===
Year	Team	Games		Receiving				
Year	Team	GP	GS	Rec	Yds	Avg	Lng	TD
1973	PIT	1	1	4	70	17.5	26	1
1974	PIT	**3**	**3**	3	30	10.0	12	0
1975	PIT	**3**	2	4	98	24.5	34	0
1976	PIT	2	1	3	114	**38.0**	**76**	1
1980	BUF	1	1	3	45	15.0	18	1
1981	BUF	2	2	**10**	**196**	19.6	50	**2**
		12	10	27	553	20.5	76	5
