= Joe Dufek =

American football player (born 1961)

No. 19
- Position: Quarterback

Personal information
- Born: August 23, 1961 (age 65); Ann Arbor, Michigan, U.S.
- Listed height: 6 ft 4 in (1.93 m)
- Listed weight: 215 lb (98 kg)

Career information
- High school: Theodore Roosevelt
- College: Yale
- NFL draft: 1983: undrafted

Career history
- Seattle Seahawks (1983)*; Buffalo Bills (1983–1985); San Diego Chargers (1985); Los Angeles Raiders (1986)*
- * Offseason or practice squad member only

Career NFL statistics
- Passing attempts: 150
- Passing completions: 74
- Completion percentage: 49.3%
- TD–INT: 4–8
- Passing yards: 829
- Passer rating: 52.9
- Stats at Pro Football Reference

Joseph Edward Dufek (born August 23, 1961) is an American former professional football player who was a quarterback in the National Football League (NFL). He was signed by the Buffalo Bills as an undrafted free agent in 1983. He played college football for the Yale Bulldogs.

== Career ==
Dufek was signed as, more or less, an afterthought when Jim Kelly, the quarterback the Bills had drafted in the first round of the 1983 draft, opted to not sign with the Bills and jumped to the United States Football League (USFL). By the 1984 season, Dufek had risen to the second-string quarterback position, behind an aging and fading Joe Ferguson. Ferguson's performance continued to deteriorate, and on September 30, after 107 consecutive games started, Ferguson was benched, and Dufek received his first game as starter. Dufek and Ferguson combined for a 2–14 record in 1984; Ferguson was traded to Detroit the following off-season, while Dufek made it through part of 1985 (not starting any games that season) before being cut.

Dufek finished the 1985 season and his professional career with the San Diego Chargers. He attempted to continue playing in the NFL, but was cut by the Raiders before the start of the 1986 Season. With the USFL folding as a result of a failed antitrust lawsuit, Dufek was one of the casualties of the tighter job market for professional football players, never playing professional football again and declining to cross picket lines in the 1987 strike.

== Family ==
He is a younger brother of Don Dufek, Jr., who was a captain of the Seattle Seahawks, Bill Dufek who was an All-American at Michigan and a son of Don Dufek, Sr., who was the most valuable player in the 1951 Rose Bowl. He is the father of Mike, an All-Big Ten Conference athlete, who played his senior season for Michigan Wolverines baseball in 2010.
