= Buster Barnett =

American football player (born 1958)

No. 84
- Position: Tight end

Personal information
- Born: November 24, 1958 (age 67); Macon, Mississippi, U.S.
- Listed height: 6 ft 5 in (1.96 m)
- Listed weight: 228 lb (103 kg)

Career information
- High school: Noxubee County (Macon)
- College: Jackson State
- NFL draft: 1981: 11th round, 299th overall pick

Career history
- Buffalo Bills (1981–1984); Los Angeles Raiders (1986)*
- * Offseason or practice squad member only

Career NFL statistics
- Receptions: 26
- Receiving yards: 236
- Touchdowns: 1
- Stats at Pro Football Reference

Buster Barnett (born November 24, 1958) is an American former professional football player who was a tight end for four seasons with the Buffalo Bills of the National Football League (NFL) from 1981 to 1984. He played college football for the Jackson State Tigers.

== Professional career ==
After playing college football for the Jackson State Tigers, Barnett was selected by the Buffalo Bills in the eleventh round of the 1981 NFL draft with the 299th overall pick. He played four seasons with the Bills, recording a career total of 26 receptions for 236 yards, including one career touchdown reception during his rookie season.

== Personal life ==
Barnett attended Noxubee County High School in Macon, Mississippi.

On July 17, 2015, Barnett's 58-year-old wife Sandra, a middle school special education teacher, was kidnapped and murdered by Buster's previous mistress, 49-year-old Lisa Brown, who then committed suicide.
