= Don Bessillieu =

American football player (born 1956)

No. 46, 47
- Position: Safety

Personal information
- Born: May 4, 1956 (age 70); Fort Benning, Georgia, U.S.
- Listed height: 6 ft 1 in (1.85 m)
- Listed weight: 200 lb (91 kg)

Career information
- High school: Columbus (GA) Kendrick
- College: Georgia Tech
- NFL draft: 1979: 5th round, 134th overall pick

Career history
- Miami Dolphins (1979–1981); St. Louis Cardinals (1982); Los Angeles Raiders (1983, 1985); Jacksonville Bulls (1984–1985); Memphis Showboats (1985)

Awards and highlights
- Super Bowl champion (XVIII)

Career NFL statistics
- Interceptions: 5
- Fumble recoveries: 4
- Touchdowns: 1
- Stats at Pro Football Reference

Don Bessillieu (born May 4, 1956) is an American former professional football player who was a safety for the Miami Dolphins, St. Louis Cardinals, and Los Angeles Raiders of the National Football League (NFL). He also played in the United States Football League (USFL). He played college football for the Georgia Tech Yellow Jackets.
