= Gene Bradley =

American football player (born 1957)

Profile
- Position: Quarterback

Personal information
- Born: November 26, 1957 (age 68); Jonesboro, Arkansas, U.S.
- Listed height: 6 ft 4 in (1.93 m)
- Listed weight: 215 lb (98 kg)

Career information
- High school: Nettleton (Jonesboro)
- College: Arkansas State (1976–1979)
- NFL draft: 1980: 2nd round, 37th overall pick

Career history
- Buffalo Bills (1980–1981); New Jersey Generals (1983–1984)

Gene Edward Bradley (born November 26, 1957) is an American former professional football player who was a quarterback for two seasons with the New Jersey Generals of the United States Football League (USFL). He was selected by the Buffalo Bills in the second round of the 1980 NFL draft but spent two seasons on injured reserve and never played in a regular-season NFL game. He played college football for the Arkansas State Red Wolves.

== Early life and college ==
Gene Edward Bradley was born on November 26, 1957, in Jonesboro, Arkansas. He attended Nettleton High School in Jonesboro.

Bradley lettered for the Arkansas State Red Wolves from 1976 to 1979. He completed 8 of 23 passes for 96 yards and one interception while also rushing for 40 yards and two touchdowns his freshman year in 1976. He only completed one of three passes for ten yards and a touchdown in 1977, and one of four passes for 12 yards and an interception in 1978. In 1979, he completed 91 of 198 passes (46.0%) for 1,091 yards, seven touchdown and 17 interceptions while also rushing for 350 yards and four touchdowns. Bradley was inducted into the Arkansas State Hall of Honor in 2009.

== Professional career ==
Despite his relatively poor college statistics, Bradley was selected by the Buffalo Bills in the second round, with the 37th overall pick, of the 1980 NFL draft. He was placed on injured reserve on August 18 and spent the entire 1980 season there. On August 18, 1981, he was placed on injured reserve again for the entire season. Bradley was released by the Bills on September 6, 1982.

Bradley played in three games for the New Jersey Generals of the United States Football League in 1983, recording seven completions on 19 passing attempts for 81 yards, one touchdown, and one interception. He played in eight games, starting two, for the Generals in 1983, completing 26 of 59 passes (44.1%) for 275 yards, one touchdown, and two interceptions while also rushing for 53 yards and one touchdown.
