= Joey Lumpkin =

American football player (born 1960)

No. 60, 59
- Position: Linebacker

Personal information
- Born: February 19, 1960 (age 66); Ardmore, Oklahoma, U.S.
- Listed height: 6 ft 2 in (1.88 m)
- Listed weight: 230 lb (104 kg)

Career information
- High school: Scottsdale (Scottsdale, Arizona)
- College: Arizona State
- NFL draft: 1982: undrafted

Career history
- Buffalo Bills (1982–1983)

Awards and highlights
- Second-team All-Pac-10 (1981)

Career NFL statistics
- Fumble recoveries: 1
- Stats at Pro Football Reference

Joey Lynn Lumpkin (born February 19, 1960) is an American former professional football player who was a linebacker for two seasons with the Buffalo Bills of the National Football League (NFL). He played college football for the Arizona State Sun Devils. Lumpkin appeared in 20 games for the Bills from 1982 to 1983.
