= Robert Holt (American football) =

American football player (born 1959)

No. 87
- Position: Wide receiver

Personal information
- Born: October 4, 1959 (age 67); Denison, Texas, U.S.
- Listed height: 6 ft 1 in (1.85 m)
- Listed weight: 182 lb (83 kg)

Career information
- High school: Grand Prairie (Grand Prairie, Texas)
- College: Baylor
- NFL draft: 1981: 6th round, 161st overall pick

Career history
- Buffalo Bills (1982)

Career NFL statistics
- Receptions: 4
- Receiving yards: 45
- Touchdowns: 0
- Stats at Pro Football Reference

Robert James Holt (born October 4, 1959) is an American former professional football player who was a wide receiver for the Buffalo Bills of the National Football League (NFL) in 1982. He played college football for the Baylor Bears and was selected 161st overall in the sixth round of the 1981 NFL draft.

As of 2022, Holt is a Physical Education Instructor at Gadsden Elementary in New Mexico.
