= Mark Roopenian =

American football player (born 1958)

No. 99
- Position: Nose tackle

Personal information
- Born: July 10, 1958 (age 68); Medford, Massachusetts, U.S.
- Listed height: 6 ft 5 in (1.96 m)
- Listed weight: 254 lb (115 kg)

Career information
- High school: Watertown (MA)
- College: Boston College (1977–1980)
- NFL draft: 1981: undrafted

Career history
- Buffalo Bills (1981–1983)
- Stats at Pro Football Reference

Mark Christopher Roopenian (born July 10, 1958) is an American former professional football nose tackle who played two seasons with the Buffalo Bills of the National Football League (NFL). He played college football at Boston College.

== Early life and college ==
Mark Christopher Roopenian was born on July 10, 1958, in Medford, Massachusetts. He participated in football, basketball, and track at Watertown High School in Watertown, Massachusetts and graduated in 1976. He was inducted into Watertown High's athletics hall of fame in 1999.

Roopenian was a four-year letterman for the Boston College Eagles of Boston College from 1977 to 1980. He redshirted in 1976. He played tight end in 1977, center in 1978, inside linebacker in 1979, and defensive tackle in 1980.

== Professional career ==
After going undrafted in the 1981 NFL draft, Roopenian signed with the Buffalo Bills on May 10. He was placed on injured reserve on September 2, 1981, due to a neck strain and spent the entire 1981 season there. He played in all nine games for the Bills during the strike-shortened 1982 season, recording one kick return for no yards. He appeared in three games in 1983 before missing the rest of the year due to a shattered spinal disc. Roopenian later had the disc surgically removed. He decided to retire on May 8, 1984.

== Personal life ==
Roopenian later became a real estate agent and youth sports coach.
