= Chris Williams (defensive back) =

American football player (born 1959)

No. 27
- Position: Defensive back

Personal information
- Born: January 2, 1959 (age 67); Alexandria, Louisiana, U.S.
- Listed height: 6 ft 0 in (1.83 m)
- Listed weight: 197 lb (89 kg)

Career information
- High school: Tioga (LA)
- College: LSU
- NFL draft: 1981: 2nd round, 49th overall pick

Career history
- Buffalo Bills (1981–1983); Los Angeles Rams (1984)*
- * Offseason or practice squad member only

Awards and highlights
- 2× First-team All-SEC (1978, 1980); Second-team All-SEC (1979)

Career NFL statistics
- Interceptions: 3
- Fumble recoveries: 1
- Stats at Pro Football Reference

Chris Albany Williams (born January 2, 1959) is an American former professional football player who was a defensive back for three seasons with the Buffalo Bills of the National Football League (NFL). He was selected by the Bills in the second round of the 1981 NFL draft. He had three interceptions and a fumble recovery in his professional career, all in 1983, in which he played in all 16 regular season games.

Williams was born in Alexandria, Louisiana and attended Tioga High School in Tioga, Louisiana. He attended college at Louisiana State University, where he was selected as first-team All-Southeastern Conference by the Associated Press in 1980 while playing college football for the LSU Tigers. Chris still holds the all-time record for interceptions (20) at LSU as well as ties for the single season record (8 in 1978).
