= Justin Cross =

Canadian gridiron football player (born 1959)

No. 78, 63
- Position: Offensive tackle

Personal information
- Born: April 19, 1959 (age 67); Montreal, Quebec, Canada
- Listed height: 6 ft 6 in (1.98 m)
- Listed weight: 263 lb (119 kg)

Career information
- High school: Portsmouth (Portsmouth, New Hampshire)
- College: Western State (CO)
- NFL draft: 1981: 10th round, 272nd overall pick

Career history
- Buffalo Bills (1982–1986); Minnesota Vikings (1987)*
- * Offseason or practice squad member only

Career NFL statistics
- Games played: 44
- Games started: 16
- Fumble recoveries: 1
- Stats at Pro Football Reference

Justin Cross (born August 19, 1959) is a Canadian former professional football player who was an offensive tackle in the National Football League (NFL) with the Buffalo Bills from 1982 to 1986. He played college football for Western State Mountaineers. He originally went to Western State for skiing, not football. During his five-year career as a Buffalo Bill, Cross played in 44 games and started 16 of them. In 1983, he played in 15 games and started 13 of them at right tackle.
