= Darrell Irvin =

American football player (born 1957)

No. 97, 70
- Position: Defensive end

Personal information
- Born: January 21, 1957 (age 69); Pawhuska, Oklahoma
- Listed height: 6 ft 4 in (1.93 m)
- Listed weight: 259 lb (117 kg)

Career information
- High school: Pawhuska
- College: Oklahoma
- NFL draft: 1980: undrafted

Career history
- Buffalo Bills (1980–1982); Seattle Seahawks (1983)
- Stats at Pro Football Reference

Darrell Bruce Irvin (born January 21, 1957) is a former National Football League player who played four seasons in the National Football League (NFL). He played 3 years with the Buffalo Bills (1980–1982) and one year with Seattle Seahawks (1983) as a Defensive End. He played college football at Northeastern Oklahoma A&M Junior College and the University of Oklahoma and attended Pawhuska High School in Pawhuska, Oklahoma.
