= Shane Nelson (American football) =

American football player (born 1955)

No. 59
- Position: Linebacker

Personal information
- Born: May 25, 1955 (age 71); Mathis, Texas, U.S.
- Listed height: 6 ft 1 in (1.85 m)
- Listed weight: 226 lb (103 kg)

Career information
- High school: Mathis
- College: Baylor
- NFL draft: 1977: undrafted

Career history
- Buffalo Bills (1977–1982)

Career NFL statistics
- Sacks: 8
- Interceptions: 5
- Fumble recoveries: 6
- Stats at Pro Football Reference

Shane Nelson (born May 25, 1955) is an American former professional football player who was a linebacker for six seasons for the Buffalo Bills of the National Football League (NFL). He played college football for the Baylor Bears.

== Early life ==
Nelson attended Mathis High School, excelling as a 5'11, 180-pound running back. He had been courted by Texas Tech University before they decided to pass on offering him a scholarship because of his size. He then tried to compete for a scholarship at Blinn Junior College, earning one with him switching to linebacker. Two years later, Baylor University offered him a scholarship.

He is also a member of the NJCAA Hall of Fame.

== Professional career ==
At 220 pounds and 6'1, Nelson was left undrafted. He was discovered at an open trial held by the Dallas Cowboys. He was the only player, out of 1,800, to be offered an NFL contract. However, Nelson rejected Dallas' offer and signed for the Bills where he felt he had more of a chance of playing. He made the 1977 roster as a longshot and eventually was named a defensive captain.

In a seven-year career, he was voted most valuable defensive player by fan groups three times. The arrival of Chuck Knox led to better days for the Bills. Alongside nose tackle Fred Smerlas and linebacker Jim Haslett, Nelson formed part of what was known for a time as the "Bermuda Triangle", which won 11 games in 1980. During a game against Cleveland in the 1981 season, he suffered a torn anterior cruciate ligament in his right knee. In the September 12 game of the 1982 season, Nelson tore that same ACL that would see him spend years in recovery. In February of 1985, he signed with the San Diego Chargers. He suffered a ruptured left Achilles tendon in the final preseason game that saw him miss the entire 1985 season. In training camp of the following preseason, he was cut on August 26. He retired soon after.

Nelson dealt with addictions to drugs during and after his career that saw him get sober in 1988. In 1990, he was diagnosed with testicular cancer and had his right testicle removed.
