= Tom Lynch (American football) =

American football player (born 1955)

No. 61
- Position: Guard

Personal information
- Born: May 24, 1955 (age 71); Chicago, Illinois, U.S.
- Listed height: 6 ft 5 in (1.96 m)
- Listed weight: 256 lb (116 kg)

Career information
- High school: Whitman-Hanson (MA)
- College: Boston College
- NFL draft: 1977: 2nd round, 30th overall pick

Career history
- Seattle Seahawks (1977–1980); Buffalo Bills (1981–1984)

Awards and highlights
- 1976 Scanlan Award

Career NFL statistics
- Games played: 105
- Games started: 53
- Stats at Pro Football Reference

Thomas Frank Lynch (born May 24, 1955) is an American former professional football player who was a guard in the National Football League (NFL) for the Seattle Seahawks and the Buffalo Bills. Lynch played college football for the Boston College Eagles.
