= Fred Smerlas =

American football player (born 1957)

No. 76
- Position: Nose tackle

Personal information
- Born: April 8, 1957 (age 69); Waltham, Massachusetts, U.S.
- Listed height: 6 ft 4 in (1.93 m)
- Listed weight: 295 lb (134 kg)

Career information
- High school: Waltham
- College: Boston College
- NFL draft: 1979: 2nd round, 32nd overall pick

Career history
- Buffalo Bills (1979–1989); San Francisco 49ers (1990); New England Patriots (1991–1992)

Awards and highlights
- 4× First-team All-Pro (1980–1983); 5× Pro Bowl (1980–1983, 1988); PFWA All-Rookie Team (1979); Buffalo Bills Wall of Fame; Buffalo Bills 50th Anniversary Team; Buffalo Bills 25th Anniversary All Time Team; Second-team All-East (1977)

Career NFL statistics
- Sacks: 29
- Interceptions: 2
- Fumble recoveries: 10
- Stats at Pro Football Reference

Frederic Charles Smerlas (born April 8, 1957) is an American former professional football player who was a nose tackle for 14 seasons in the National Football League (NFL). A five-time Pro Bowl selection with the Buffalo Bills, he also played for the San Francisco 49ers and New England Patriots.

== Early life ==
Smerlas was born to Peter and Katina Smerlas on April 8, 1957. According to his family, Smerlas was bench-pressing over 400 pounds by the 12th grade, having had a frame of 6'3" and 250 pounds. Smerlas, of Greek-American descent, graduated from Waltham High School in 1975, where he was a star football player and wrestler; he was a two-time New England heavyweight wrestling champion. He became a defensive lineman for Boston College before embarking on an NFL career.

== Professional career ==
Smerlas was drafted in the second round in the 1979 draft by the Buffalo Bills, then coached by Chuck Knox. In the 3-4 defensive scheme employed by Knox, Smerlas soon became a key part of what became known as "the Bermuda Triangle" with linebackers Shane Nelson and Jim Haslett. A serious competitor, Smerlas made sure to get plenty of sleep to prepare for games, most notably with making sure to not drink alcohol from Tuesday to Saturday in the season while also studying the film of various great noseguards and defensive tackles after practices such as Bob Baumhower and Curley Culp. He soon made his own style of play that he described as such: "crowd the ball, get as close to the center as possible, square my stance and get my hands into him quickly. If I was quick enough, he'd take me where I wanted to go. It was read on the run. I was like the Sundance Kid—couldn't shoot straight except when he would draw. That was me. I could read moving, but not sitting. Dwight Stephenson [the veteran Dolphin center] made me change my style—for him. He developed the technique of holding the ball way out away from him, and he was so fast that he'd use my momentum against me and throw me sideways. I had to change the angle of my charge. The AFC East was the home of the great centers. There wasn't a weak one in the bunch."

During Smerlas' playing career, he was the only player in the NFL who was of Greek descent. Smerlas played in over 200 games as an NFL player (157 starts in a row) despite 27 surgeries. Among the various injuries he suffered was partially torn cartilage in his right knee, a hyperextended elbow & pinched rotator cuff (which he played through), a sprained ankle (which he asked to tape up). Smerlas' 1990 autobiography, By a Nose, recounts his 11 years with the Bills and their climb from cellar-dwellers to Super Bowl contenders. By the time Smerlas was in his tenth season, he was one of just two nose tackles to play over 140 games at the position (with Rubin Carter being the only other one).

In the 1989 offseason, Smerlas decided to test Plan B free agency. The Bills, now coached by Marv Levy (favoring youth in the position with newly drafted Jeff Wright), decided to let him sign with the San Francisco 49ers. He played the 1990 season with the 49ers while the Bills went to the first of four straight Super Bowls. Smerlas closed his career out with the New England Patriots for two seasons before retiring.

== After football ==
Smerlas married Kristy Kefalas in February 1988, having met through backup nose-guard Bill Acker.

Smerlas quickly became involved with business right from the get-go after retiring, starting his own company in All-Pro Productions to serve as an umbrella for his business dealings and enterprises under the logic of, “If you want to live right, you have to work right. You can’t be a meathead.” Smerlas was inducted to the Bills Wall of Fame on December 16, 2001.

Smerlas (described in 2018 as an "self-described right-wing, gun-toting, cigar-smoking, meat-eating, Christian conservative") currently resides in Massachusetts and is a part-time co-host during football season on sports radio WEEI-FM, NBC Sports Boston - The New England Tailgate Show, as well as a contributor to western New York radio station WHAM (AM) in Rochester. Smerlas, along with friend and colleague Steve DeOssie, opened an award-winning steakhouse at the Twin River Casino in Lincoln, Rhode Island, in March 2007 called Fred & Steve's Steakhouse.

In 2018, the Professional Football Researchers Association named Smerlas to the PFRA Hall of Very Good Class of 2018.

== See also ==
- Most consecutive starts by a nose tackle

== Bibliography ==
- Fred Smerlas and Vic Carucci, By a Nose: The Off-Center Life of Football's Funniest Lineman, Simon And Schuster, 1990. ISBN 0-671-70532-6
