= Ken Johnson (defensive end, born 1955) =

American football player (born 1955)

No. 91, 97
- Position: Defensive end

Personal information
- Born: March 25, 1955 (age 71); Nashville, Tennessee, U.S.
- Listed height: 6 ft 6 in (1.98 m)
- Listed weight: 245 lb (111 kg)

Career information
- High school: Stratford (TN)
- College: Knoxville
- NFL draft: 1979: 4th round, 83rd overall pick

Career history
- Buffalo Bills (1979–1984); Kansas City Chiefs (1987)

Career NFL statistics
- Fumble recoveries: 4
- Sacks: 13.5
- Safeties: 1
- Stats at Pro Football Reference

Kenneth Eugene Johnson (born March 25, 1955) is an American former professional football player who was a defensive end in the National Football League (NFL). After playing college football for the Knoxville Bulldogs, Johnson was selected by the Buffalo Bills in the fourth round of the 1979 NFL draft. He played six seasons for the Buffalo Bills from 1979 to 1984 and two game for the Kansas City Chiefs during the 1987 strike shortened season.
