= Jon Borchardt =

American football player (born 1957)

No. 73, 76
- Positions: Guard, tackle

Personal information
- Born: August 13, 1957 (age 69); Minneapolis, Minnesota, U.S.
- Listed height: 6 ft 5 in (1.96 m)
- Listed weight: 260 lb (118 kg)

Career information
- High school: Park Center (MN)
- College: Montana State
- NFL draft: 1979: 3rd round, 62nd overall pick

Career history
- Buffalo Bills (1979–1984); Seattle Seahawks (1985–1987)

Career NFL statistics
- Games played: 130
- Games started: 55
- Fumble recoveries: 1
- Stats at Pro Football Reference

Jon L. Borchardt (born August 13, 1957) is an American former professional football player who was a guard in the National Football League (NFL). He played for the Buffalo Bills from 1979 to 1984 and for the Seattle Seahawks from 1985 to 1987. He played college football for the Montana State Bobcats.
