= Ervin Parker =

American football player (born 1958)

No. 62
- Position: Linebacker

Personal information
- Born: August 19, 1958 (age 68); Georgetown, South Carolina, U.S.
- Listed height: 6 ft 4 in (1.93 m)
- Listed weight: 236 lb (107 kg)

Career information
- High school: Choppee (Georgetown)
- College: South Carolina State
- NFL draft: 1980: 4th round, 93rd overall pick

Career history
- Buffalo Bills (1980–1983); Seattle Seahawks (1987)*; Hamilton Tiger-Cats (1987)
- * Offseason or practice squad member only

Career NFL statistics
- Sacks: 4
- Fumble recoveries: 2
- Stats at Pro Football Reference

Ervin J. Parker (born August 19, 1958) is an American former professional football player who was a linebacker in the National Football League (NFL) for the Buffalo Bills. He played college football for the South Carolina State Bulldogs and was selected by the Bills in the fourth round of the 1980 NFL draft.
