= Rod Kush =

American football player (born 1956)

No. 42, 37
- Position: Safety

Personal information
- Born: December 29, 1956 (age 69); Omaha, Nebraska, U.S.
- Listed height: 6 ft 0 in (1.83 m)
- Listed weight: 188 lb (85 kg)

Career information
- High school: Omaha Burke
- College: Nebraska-Omaha
- NFL draft: 1979: 5th round, 114th overall pick

Career history
- Buffalo Bills (1980–1984); Houston Oilers (1985)

Career NFL statistics
- Interceptions: 4
- Sacks: 12.5
- Fumble recoveries: 9
- Stats at Pro Football Reference

Rod Kush (born December 29, 1956), is also known as "the Krusher". He is an American former professional football player who was a safety in the National Football League (NFL). After playing college football for the Nebraska–Omaha Mavericks, he played in the NFL for the Buffalo Bills and Houston Oilers.

Kush then decided to open a furniture store called "Rod Kush's Furniture", which went out of business in 2007. Later, Kush opened his new chain of furniture stores, "7 Day Furniture", with locations in both Omaha and Lincoln, Nebraska. He previously resided in Gretna, Nebraska before moving to Ashland, Nebraska. His previous house in Gretna fell into disrepair and was demolished. The land now includes a senior living home.
