= Chris Keating =

American football player (born 1957)

No. 52, 59
- Position: Linebacker

Personal information
- Born: October 12, 1957 (age 69); Boston, Massachusetts, U.S.
- Listed height: 6 ft 2 in (1.88 m)
- Listed weight: 223 lb (101 kg)

Career information
- High school: Archbishop Williams
- College: Maine
- NFL draft: 1979: undrafted

Career history
- Buffalo Bills (1979–1984); Washington Redskins (1985)

Career NFL statistics
- Sacks: 2
- Interceptions: 3
- Fumble recoveries: 3
- Stats at Pro Football Reference

Christopher Paul Keating (born October 12, 1957) is an American former professional football player who was a linebacker in the National Football League (NFL) for the Buffalo Bills and Washington Redskins. He played college football for the Maine Black Bears.

Keating worked in the investment management industry after retiring from football in 1986 and remained in that field until 2022 when he began his transition to becoming a certified mediator. He now practices mediation and provides special consulting services in the investment management field.
