= 1960 Buffalo Bills season =

Inaugural season in franchise history

- Owner: Ralph Wilson
- Head coach: Buster Ramsey
- Home stadium: War Memorial Stadium

Results
- Record: 5–8–1
- Division place: 3rd AFL Eastern
- Playoffs: Did not qualify

The 1960 Buffalo Bills season was the club's first season in the American Football League (AFL) and their first overall season as a pro-football franchise. Home games were played at War Memorial Stadium in Buffalo, New York. Head Coach Buster Ramsey's Bills compiled a 5–8–1 record, placing them third in the AFL Eastern Division.

Unlike most of the offensive-minded AFL, the Bills focused on defense, allowing the third-fewest points in the league (303). Their defensive line boasted Laverne Torczon and Chuck McMurtry (both of whom were 1st Team All-AFL in 1960), as well as a mobile, hard-hitting middle linebacker in Archie Matsos, who was AFL All-Star in each of the three seasons he spent in Buffalo. The Bills' defense led the league in fewest passing yards allowed (2,130) and most passes intercepted (33), with NFL veterans Richie McCabe and Jim Wagstaff in their secondary.

The Bills' offense, however, was not as competent. The 1960 Bills had the worst passing attack in the AFL, throwing for 2,346 yards. Former Cleveland Browns quarterback Tommy O'Connell started the season 1–3 before being replaced by Johnny Green. Green would go 3–3 as a starter, despite only completing 39% of his passes. Richie Lucas, the Bills' first ever draft pick, was a bust, both at quarterback and at halfback, throwing only 49 passes all season.

The Bills did show glimmers of hope on offense, however, by showcasing running back Wray Carlton and flanker Elbert Dubenion, who would later go on to be AFL All-Stars for the Bills in the mid-1960s.

== Uniforms ==
In their first season, the Bills wore silver helmets and royal blue home jerseys. Their road jerseys were white with royal blue letters. The team wore white pants both at home and on the road. The Bills' helmets displayed the player's number in royal blue on the side where the logo would normally be (much like the Alabama Crimson Tide's helmets).

The uniforms, not coincidentally, resembled those of the National Football League (NFL)'s Detroit Lions. Bills owner Ralph C. Wilson, Jr. grew up in Detroit and had once been a minority owner in the Lions.

== Offseason ==
When Lamar Hunt announced formation of the American Football League in the summer of 1959, Buffalo was one of the target cities Hunt sought, based on its previous success with the Bills in the AAFC. His first choice of owner, however, turned him down; Pat McGroder (then a liquor store owner and sports liaison with the city of Buffalo) was still hopeful that the threat of the AFL would prompt the NFL to come back to Buffalo to try and stop the AFL from gaining a foothold there (as the NFL would do with teams in Minnesota, Dallas, St. Louis and later Atlanta). McGroder's hopes never came to fruition, and in 1961, he took a position in the new Bills organization.

Harry Wismer, who was to own the Titans of New York franchise, reached out to insurance salesman and automobile heir Ralph C. Wilson, Jr. to see if he was interested in joining the upstart league. (Both Wismer and Wilson were minority owners of NFL franchises at the time: Wilson part-owned the Detroit Lions, while Wismer was a small partner in the Washington Redskins but had little power due to majority owner George Preston Marshall's near-iron fist over the team and the league). Wilson agreed to field a team in the new league, with the words "Count me in. I'll take a franchise anywhere you suggest." Hunt gave him the choice of six cities: Miami, Buffalo, Cincinnati, St. Louis, Atlanta, or Louisville, Kentucky; after being turned down in his effort to put a team in Miami, he consulted with Detroit media, who connected him with McGroder and The Buffalo News managing editor Paul Neville; their efforts to lobby Wilson to come to Buffalo were successful, and Wilson sent Hunt a telegram with the now-famous words, "Count me in with Buffalo."

The Buffalo Bills were a charter member of the American Football League (AFL) in 1960. After a public contest, the team adopted the same name as the AAFC Buffalo Bills, the former All-America Football Conference team in Buffalo.

== 1960 AFL draft ==
Two Rounds of draft were held, the first round called "First Selections", the second round "Second Selections".

=== First Selections ===
- Charles Bevins, HB, Morris Brown
- Don Black, E, New Mexico
- Bill Burrell, G, Illinois
- Paul Choquette, FB, Brown
- Mike Connelly, C, Utah State
- Jim Conroy, FB, USC
- Bob Coogan, T/G, Utah
- Louis Cordileone, G, Clemson
- Ted Dean, FB, Wichita
- Willie Evans, HB, Buffalo
- Ross Fichtner, QB, Purdue
- Jon Gilliam, C, E. Texas State
- Al Goldstein, E, North Carolina
- James Houston, E, Ohio State
- Ray Jauch, HB, Iowa
- Robert Khayat, T, Mississippi
- Ken Kirk, C, Mississippi
- Jim Leo, E, Cincinnati
- Richie Lucas, QB, Penn State
- Charles McMurtry, T/G, Whittier
- Bubba Meyer, E, TCU
- Ron Miller, E, Vanderbilt
- Gale Oliver, T, Texas A&M
- Harold Olson, T, Clemson
- Ray Peterson, HB, West Virginia
- Vince Promuto, G, Holy Cross
- Rene Ramirez, HB, Texas
- Len Rohde, T, Utah State
- Joe Schaffer, T, Tennessee
- Wayne Schneider, HB, Colorado State
- Ivan Toncic, QB, Pittsburgh
- Larry Wilson, HB, Utah

=== Second Selections ===
- Dwight Baumgartner, E, Duke
- Tom Day, T/G, North Carolina A&T
- Babe Dreymala, T/G, Texas
- Joe Gomes, HB, South Carolina
- Mike Graney, E, Notre Dame
- Pete Hall, QB, Marquette
- Jim Hanna, E, USC
- Ernie Hanson, C, Arizona State
- John Littlejohn, HB, Kansas State
- Marvin Luster, E, UCLA
- Dwight Nichols, HB, Iowa State
- Merlin Priddy, HB, TCU
- Gary Ratkowski, HB, Citadel
- Dale Rems, T/G, Purdue
- Carl Robison, T/G, S. Carolina State
- Bob Sliva, T/G, Stephen F. Austin
- James Sorey, T/G, Texas Southern
- Jerry Thompson, T/G, Oklahoma
- Royce Whittington, T/G, Southwestern
- Darrell Harper, HB, Michigan

== Personnel ==
=== Staff/Coaches ===
1960 Buffalo Bills staff
Front office: President – Ralph Wilson; Vice-President/Minority Owner – Pat McGroder; General Manager – Dick Gallagher; Head coaches: Head Coach – Buster Ramsey; Offensive coaches: Offensive Backfield – Floyd Reid; Ends – Bob Dove	Defensive coaches: Defensive backs – Harvey Johnson

=== Roster ===
1960 Buffalo Bills roster
Quarterbacks (QB): 18 Johnny Green; 14 Tommy O'Connell; Running backs (RB): 30 Wray Carlton; 23 Willmer Fowler; 43 Joe Kulbacki; 11 Richie Lucas QB; 35 Carl Smith; Wide receivers (WR): 44 Elbert Dubenion; 88 Al Hoisington; 81 Tom Rychlec; Tight ends (TE): 84 Dan Chamberlain; 80 Monte Crockett	Offensive linemen (OL): 60 Phil Blazer G; 77 Don Chelf G/T; 62 Tony Discenzo T; 52 Dan McGrew C; 70 Chuck Muelhaupt G; 74 Harold Olson T; 75 Robert Sedlock T; Defensive linemen (DL): 78 Gene Grabosky DT; 73 Chuck McMurtry DT; 76 Jack Scott DT; 79 Jim Sorey DT; 87 LaVerne Torczon DE; 71 Mack Yoho DE/K	Linebackers (LB): 55 Bernie Buzyniski OLB; 54 Joe Hergert OLB/K; 57 Jack Laraway OLB; 56 Archie Matsos MLB; 67 Joe Schaffer OLB; Defensive backs (DB): 20 Billy Atkins CB/K/P; 42 Jack Johnson CB/S; 24 Billy Kinard CB; 45 Dick McCabe CB; 22 Jim Wagstaff SS; Special teams (ST)	Rookies in italics

== Season schedule ==
=== Preseason ===
Week	Date	Opponent	Result	Record	Venue	Attendance
1	July 30	Boston Patriots	**L** 7–28	0–1	War Memorial Stadium	16,474
2	August 13	Denver Broncos	**W** 31–14	1–1	Aquinas Stadium	6,200
3	August 21	at Boston Patriots	**L** 7–21	1–2	Fitton Field	7,000
4	August 24	Oakland Raiders	**L** 21–26	1–3	War Memorial Stadium	17,071
5	September 4	New York Titans	**L** 31–52	1–4	War Memorial Stadium	6,821

=== Regular season ===
Week	Date	Opponent	Result	Record	Venue	Attendance	Game Recap
1	September 11	at **New York Titans**	**L** 3–27	0–1	Polo Grounds	10,200	Recap
2	September 18	Denver Broncos	**L** 21–27	0–2	War Memorial Stadium	15,229	Recap
3	September 23	at **Boston Patriots**	**W** 13–0	1–2	Boston University Field	20,732	Recap
4	October 2	Los Angeles Chargers	**L** 10–24	1–3	War Memorial Stadium	15,821	Recap
5	Bye						
6	October 16	**New York Titans**	**L** 13–17	1–4	War Memorial Stadium	14,988	Recap
7	October 23	Oakland Raiders	**W** 38–9	2–4	War Memorial Stadium	8,876	Recap
8	October 30	**Houston Oilers**	**W** 25–24	3–4	War Memorial Stadium	23,001	Recap
9	November 6	Dallas Texans	**L** 28–45	3–5	War Memorial Stadium	19,610	Recap
10	November 13	at Oakland Raiders	**L** 7–20	3–6	Kezar Stadium	8,800	Recap
11	November 20	at Los Angeles Chargers	**W** 32–3	4–6	Los Angeles Memorial Coliseum	16,161	Recap
12	November 27	at Denver Broncos	**T** 38–38	4–6–1	Bears Stadium	7,785	Recap
13	December 4	**Boston Patriots**	**W** 38–14	5–6–1	War Memorial Stadium	14,335	Recap
14	December 11	at **Houston Oilers**	**L** 23–31	5–7–1	Jeppesen Stadium	25,243	Recap
15	December 18	at Dallas Texans	**L** 7–24	5–8–1	Cotton Bowl	18,000	Recap
Note: Intra-division opponents are in **bold** text.

=== Season summary ===
==== Week 1: at New York Titans ====
Week One: Buffalo Bills (0–0) at New York Titans (0–0)

Quarter	1	2	3	4	Total
Bills	3	0	0	0	**3**
**Titans**	0	17	3	7	**27**

at Polo Grounds, New York, New York

- Date: September 11
- Game weather: 65 °F (18 °C)
- Game attendance: 10,200
- Box Score

Game information

**First quarter**

- BUF – Darrell Harper 35-yard field goal. Bills 3-0. Drive:

**Second quarter**

- NY – Bill Shockley 15-yard field goal. Tie 3–3. Drive:
- NY – Al Dorow 2-yard run (Bill Shockley kick). Titans 10–3. Drive:
- NY – Al Dorow 15-yard run (Bill Shockley kick). Titans 17–3. Drive:

**Third quarter**

- NY – Bill Shockley 39-yard field goal. Titans 20–3. Drive:

**Fourth quarter**

- NY – Art Powell 13-yard pass from Dick Jamieson (Bill Shockley kick). Titans 27–3. Drive:

Top passers

- BUF – Tommy O'Connell – 2/10, 37 yards, INT
- NY – Dick Jamieson – 9/18, 152 yards, TD

Top rushers

- BUF – Bob Brodhead – 4 rushes, 42 yards
- NY – Pete Hart – 11 rushes, 66 yards

Top receivers

- BUF – Elbert Dubenion – 1 reception, 22 yards
- NY – Don Maynard – 4 receptions, 116 yards

==== Week 3 ====
Team	1	2	3	4	Total
• Bills	6	7	0	0	13
Patriots	0	0	0	0	0

- Date: September 23
- Location: Nickerson Field
- Game attendance: 20,732
- Game weather: 60 °F (16 °C), wind 11

Scoring summary
Q1	BUF	Smith 65 yard pass from O'Connell (kick failed)	BUF 6–0
Q2	BUF	Carlton 2 yard run (Atkins kick)	BUF 13–0

Buffalo's first win in franchise history.

==== Week 6: vs. New York Titans ====
Week Six: New York Titans (3–2) at Buffalo Bills (1–3)

Quarter	1	2	3	4	Total
**Titans**	7	3	0	7	**17**
Bills	6	0	0	7	**13**

at War Memorial Stadium, Buffalo, New York

- Date: October 16
- Game weather: 58 °F (14 °C)
- Game attendance: 14,988
- Box Score

Game information

**First quarter**

- NY – Thurlow Cooper 3-yard pass from Al Dorow (Bill Shockley kick). Titans 7–0. Drive:
- BUF – Wray Carlton 54-yard run (kick failed). Titans 7–6. Drive:

**Second quarter**

- NY – Bill Shockley 43-yard field goal. Titans 10–6. Drive:

**Third quarter**

- No scoring

**Fourth quarter**

- BUF – Elbert Dubenion 32-yard pass from Johnny Green (Billy Atkins kick). Bills 13–10. Drive:
- NY – Al Dorow 1-yard run (Bill Shockley kick). Titans 17–13. Drive:

Top passers

- NY – Al Dorow – 16/35, 158 yards, TD, 3 INT
- BUF – Johnny Green – 10/24, 127 yards, TD, 2 INT

Top rushers

- NY – Al Dorow – 18 rushes, 72 yards, TD
- BUF – Wray Carlton – 9 rushes, 98 yards, TD

Top receivers

- NY – Don Maynard – 6 receptions, 82 yards
- BUF – Elbert Dubenion – 3 receptions, 46 yards, TD

==== Week 7: vs. Oakland Raiders ====
Team	1	2	3	4	Total
Raiders	0	7	0	2	9
• Bills	14	14	3	7	38

- Date: October 23
- Location: War Memorial Stadium
- Game attendance: 8,876
- Game weather: 50 °F (10 °C); wind 17

Scoring summary
Q1	BUF	Carlton 38 yard pass from Green (Atkins kick)	BUF 7–0
Q1	BUF	Carlton 23 yard pass from Green (Atkins kick)	BUF 14–0
Q2	BUF	Dubenion 55 yard pass from Green (Atkins kick)	BUF 21–0
Q2	OAK	Smith 1 yard run (Barnes kick)	BUF 21–7
Q2	BUF	Carlton 32 yard pass from Green (Atkins kick)	BUF 28–7
Q3	BUF	Hergert 26 yard field goal	BUF 31–7
Q4	BUF	Green 2 yard run (Atkins kick)	BUF 38–7
Q4	OAK	Safety, center snap out of end zone	BUF 38–9

== Standings ==
AFL Eastern Division
	W	L	T	PCT	DIV	PF	PA	STK
Houston Oilers	10	4	0	.714	5–1	379	285	W2
New York Titans	7	7	0	.500	2–4	382	399	L1
Buffalo Bills	5	8	1	.385	3–3	296	303	L2
Boston Patriots	5	9	0	.357	2–4	286	349	L4

Note: Tie games were not officially counted in the standings in the AFL.
