= 1961 Buffalo Bills season =

2nd season in franchise history

- Owner: Ralph Wilson
- Head coach: Buster Ramsey
- Home stadium: War Memorial Stadium

Results
- Record: 6–8
- Division place: 4th Eastern
- Playoffs: Did not qualify

The 1961 Buffalo Bills season was the team's second year in the American Football League. The Bills played in the Eastern division, winning six games, losing eight, and missing the postseason.

The Bills didn't have a winning record at any point in the season; they played their final five games of the season on the road.

== Season summary ==
The Bills had a problematic quarterback situation, with former Redskin M.C. Reynolds, second-year Bills QB Johnny Green and ex-Lion Warren Rabb all struggling at the passer position. None completed more than 46% of their passes, and only Reynolds had a winning record (2–1) and threw for more than 1,000 yards.

Punter Billy Atkins led the league in punts, with 85; he also led the league with 44.5 yards per punt. Atkins also played safety for the Bills in 1961, and led the league with 10 interceptions, and was 2nd-Team All-AFL on defense.

Middle linebacker Archie Matsos was 1st-Team All-AFL for the second consecutive year, as was defensive tackle Chuck McMurtry. Defensive tackle LaVerne Torczon was 2nd-Team All-AFL in 1961.

== Offseason ==
=== AFL draft ===
= All-AFL

Round	Player	Position	College
1	Ken Rice	Tackle	Auburn
2	Billy Shaw	Tackle	Georgia Tech
3	Art Baker	Fullback	Syracuse (from New York)
3	Tom Gilburg	Tackle	Syracuse
4	Stew Barber	Tackle	Penn State
5	Norm Snead*	Quarterback	Wake Forest
6	Fred Brown	Halfback	Georgia
7	Albert Bemiller	Center	Syracuse
8	Charles Linning	Tackle	Miami
9	William Majors	Halfback	Tennessee
10	Don Kern	Halfback	VMI
11	Roy Wall	Halfback	North Carolina
12	Floyd Powers	Guard	Mississippi State
13	Tom Causey	Offensive end	Louisiana Tech
14	Ron Kostelnik*	Tackle	Cincinnati
15	Jerry Frye	Offensive end	South Carolina
16	Vincent Scott	Offensive end	Maryland
17	Wayne Wolff	Tackle	Wake Forest
18	John Bodkin	Guard	South Carolina
19	Charley Barnes	Offensive end	NE Louisiana State
20	Everett Cloud	Halfback	Maryland
21	Larry Vargo	Offensive end	Detroit
22	Charles Baker	Tackle	Tennessee
23	William Mack	Halfback	Notre Dame
24	Frank Jackunas	Center	Detroit
25	Jack Harbaugh	Halfback	Bowling Green
26	Lorenzo Stanford	Tackle	North Carolina A & I
27	Bob Allen	Offensive end	Wake Forest
28	Jason Harness	Offensive end	Michigan State
29	Mike Stock	Halfback	Northwestern
30	William Martin	Halfback	Minnesota

== 1961 Preseason ==
The 1961 preseason was notable for the Bills as they became the only AFL (or NFL) team to lose to a CFL team, and it was the last game between the CFL and AFL/NFL met in history.

Week	Date	Opponent	Result	Record	Venue	Attendance
1	August 8	at Hamilton Tiger-Cats	L 21–38	0–1	Hamilton Civic Stadium	12,000
2	August 18	Dallas Texans	L 26–35	0–2	War Memorial Stadium	11,166
3	August 25	at Boston Patriots	L 10–28	0–3	Mt. Pleasant Stadium (Providence, RI)	4,762
4	September 1	Boston Patriots	L 12–15	0–4	War Memorial Stadium	17,071

== 1961 Regular Season ==
Week	Date	Opponent	Result	Record	Venue	Attendance	Recap	Sources
1	September 10	Denver Broncos	**L** 10–22	0–1	War Memorial Stadium	16,636	Recap	
2	September 17	**New York Titans**	**W** 41–31	1–1	War Memorial Stadium	15,584	Recap	
3	September 23	**Boston Patriots**	**L** 21–23	1–2	War Memorial Stadium	21,504	Recap	
4	September 30	San Diego Chargers	**L** 11–19	1–3	War Memorial Stadium	20,742	Recap	
5	October 8	at **Houston Oilers**	**W** 22–12	2–3	Jeppesen Stadium	22,761	Recap	
6	October 15	Dallas Texans	**W** 27–24	3–3	War Memorial Stadium	20,678	Recap	
7	October 22	at **Boston Patriots**	**L** 21–52	3–4	Boston University Field	9,398	Recap	
8	October 29	**Houston Oilers**	**L** 16–28	3–5	War Memorial Stadium	21,237	Recap	
9	November 5	Oakland Raiders	**L** 22–31	3–6	War Memorial Stadium	17,027	Recap	
10	November 12	at Dallas Texans	**W** 30–20	4–6	Cotton Bowl	15,000	Recap	
11	November 19	at Denver Broncos	**W** 23–10	5–6	Bears Stadium	7,645	Recap	
12	November 23	at **New York Titans**	**L** 14–21	5–7	Polo Grounds	12,023	Recap	
13	December 3	at Oakland Raiders	**W** 26–21	6–7	Candlestick Park	8,011	Recap	
14	December 10	at San Diego Chargers	**L** 10–28	6–8	Balboa Stadium	24,486	Recap	
Note: Intra-division opponents are in **bold** text.

== Standings ==
Program for the October 29 game against the visiting Houston Oilers.

AFL Eastern Division
	W	L	T	PCT	DIV	PF	PA	STK
Houston Oilers	10	3	1	.769	4–1–1	513	242	W9
Boston Patriots	9	4	1	.692	2–3–1	413	313	W4
New York Titans	7	7	0	.500	3–3	301	390	L2
Buffalo Bills	6	8	0	.429	2–4	294	342	L1

Note: Tie games were not officially counted in the standings in the AFL.

== Personnel ==
=== Staff ===
1961 Buffalo Bills staff
Front office: President/majority owner – Ralph Wilson; Vice-president/minority owner – Pat McGroder; Head coaches: Head coach – Buster Ramsey; Offensive coaches: Offensive backfield – Floyd Reid; Ends – Bob Dove	Defensive coaches: Defensive backs – Harvey Johnson

=== Final roster ===
1961 Buffalo Bills roster
Quarterbacks: 18 Johnny Green; 14 M. C. Reynolds; Running backs: 33 Art Baker; 26 Dewey Bohling; 30 Wray Carlton; 23 Bill Shockley K; Wide receivers: 88 Glenn Bass; 44 Elbert Dubenion; 84 Perry Richards; Tight ends: 80 Monte Crockett; 81 Tom Rychlec	Offensive linemen: 50 Al Bemiller C; 60 John Dittrich G; 77 Donald Chelf T; 70 Chuck Muelhaupt G; 74 Harold Olson T; 75 Ken Rice T; 66 Billy Shaw G; Defensive linemen: 64 Tom Day DT/DE; 73 Chuck McMurtry DT; 79 Jim Sorey DT; 87 Laverne Torczon DE; 71 Mack Yoho DE/K	Linebackers: 64 Stew Barber OLB; 54 Joe Hergert OLB/K; 57 Ralph Felton 0LB; 59 Cotton Letner OLB; 56 Archie Matsos MLB; Defensive backs: 20 Billy Atkins FS/K/P; 25 Jim Crotty CB; 42 Don McDonald CB/SS; 25 Vern Valdez CB; 22 Jim Wagstaff SS	Reserve list: 46 Fred Brown RB (IR); 23 Willmer Fowler RB (IR); 15 Richie Lucas QB/WR/S (Military); 45 Dick McCabe CB (Retired); 14 Tommy O'Connell QB (Retired); 17 Warren Rabb QB (IR)
*Note: rookies in italics
