= 1962 Buffalo Bills season =

3rd season in franchise history

- Owner: Ralph Wilson
- Head coach: Lou Saban
- Home stadium: War Memorial Stadium

Results
- Record: 7–6–1
- Division place: 3rd AFL Eastern
- Playoffs: Did not qualify

The 1962 Buffalo Bills season was the team’s third season in the American Football League. The Bills finished the season with a 7–6–1 record, third place in the AFL East; it was the Bills' first-ever season finishing with a winning record.

The Bills lost their first five games of the season, but finished the final nine games with only one loss (and one tie).

This was the first season that the Bills wore their now famous red, white, and blue uniforms, having retired their Detroit Lions style uniforms the previous year.

== Season summary ==
The Bills were a run-heavy offense in 1962; they led the league in rushing yards, with 2,480. The Bills ran the ball 58.8 percent of the time on offense. The Bills gained 5.0 yards per carry as a team, tied for the league lead.

Bills running back Cookie Gilchrist, who came to the Bills in 1962 from the Canadian Football League, led the AFL in rushing yards with 1,096 yards. and 13 rushing touchdowns. Running back Wray Carlton ran for 530 yards, but led the league with 5.6 yards per rushing attempt.

The Bills' defense got a major infusion of talent on defense, as rookies Tom Sestak, Mike Stratton, Ray Abruzzese, and Booker Edgerson won starting jobs.

== Offseason ==
During the offseason, the Bills removed former coach Buster Ramsey and hired Lou Saban to helm the team.

The Bills also picked up former Chargers quarterback Jack Kemp off the waiver wire. Kemp had a broken hand, and as such could not play until the twelfth game of the season, but he would prove to be the best Bills quarterback of the 1960s.

=== AFL draft ===
Defensive lineman Tom Sestak and linebacker Mike Stratton started for the Bills on defense as rookies; both would go on to be AFL All-Stars multiple times.

==== Ernie Davis ====
The Bills selected Heisman Trophy winner Ernie Davis from Syracuse with their first draft pick, and Davis may have very well signed with his hometown Bills (Davis grew up in nearby Elmira), since the National Football League team that drafted him, the Washington Redskins, was led by avowed racist George Preston Marshall and had only drafted Davis as a token black to avoid losing the Redskins' stadium lease; Davis refused to play for the Redskins. The Redskins traded Davis's rights to the Cleveland Browns, and Davis instead signed with the Browns. Unfortunately for all parties, Davis was diagnosed with acute monocytic leukemia in the summer of 1962, and the Browns barred him from playing for the team (despite the cancer being in remission by the time the preseason began). The cancer later returned, and Davis died May 18, 1963, having never played a down of professional football.

= AFL All-Star

Round	Player	Position	College
1	Ernie Davis	Halfback	Syracuse
2	Glenn Glass	Halfback	Tennessee
3	John Elwell	End	Purdue
5	Tom Dellinger	Halfback	North Carolina State
6	Dave Viti	End	Boston University
7	Jim LeCompte	Guard	North Carolina
8	Paul White	Halfback	Florida
9	Bill Saul	Center	Penn State
10	Amos Bullocks	Halfback	Southern Illinois
11	Jerry Croft	Guard	Bowling Green
11	Tom Pennington	End	Georgia
13	Ron Gassert	Tackle	Virginia
13	Mike Stratton	End	Tennessee
14	Ron Scufca	Tackle	Purdue
15	Roger Kochman	Halfback	Penn State
16	Frank Imperiale	Tackle	Southern Illinois
17	Tom Sestak	End	McNeese State
18	Joe Kehoe	End	Virginia (VOIDED) Carolina
19	Bill Johnson	Linebacker	Southeast Louisiana
20	Sam Tidmore	End	Ohio State
21	Carey Henley	Halfback	Chattanooga
22	Tom Hall	End	Minnesota
23	Ray Abruzzese	Halfback	Alabama
24	Stan Sczurek	Guard	Purdue
25	Dave Gash	End	Kentucky
26	Ed Reynolds	Tackle	Tulane
27	Claude Crabb	Halfback	Colorado
28	Roy Walker	Fullback	Purdue
29	Jim Beaver	Guard	Florida
30	Cody Binkley	Center	Vanderbilt
31	Jim Collier	End	Arkansas
32	Ken Erickson	End	Syracuse
33	Tony Parilli	Guard	Illinois
34	Ben Charles	Quarterback	USC

== Personnel ==
=== Staff / Coaches ===
1962 Buffalo Bills staff
Front office: President/majority owner – Ralph Wilson; Vice-president/minority owner – Pat McGroder; Head coaches: Head coach – Lou Saban; Offensive coaches: Running backs/wide receivers – John Mazur; Offensive line – Red Miller	Defensive coaches: Defensive line – Jerry Smith; Linebackers/Defensive Backs – Joe Collier

=== Final roster ===
1962 Buffalo Bills roster
Quarterbacks: 15 Jack Kemp; 17 Warren Rabb; Running backs: 22 Wayne Crow P; 34 Cookie Gilchrist K; 27 Willie Jones; Wide receivers: 88 Glenn Bass; 44 Elbert Dubenion; Tight ends: 80 Monte Crockett; 81 Tom Rychlec; 84 Ernie Warlick	Offensive linemen: 77 Stew Barber T; 60 Al Bemiller C; 64 Tom Day G; 72 Jerry DeLucca T; 73 George Flint G; 54 Frank Jackunas C; 74 Harold Olson T; 66 Billy Shaw G; Defensive linemen: 75 Nate Borden DE; 87 Leroy Moore DE; 70 Tom Sestak DT; 79 Jim Sorey DT/DE; 82 Mack Yoho DE/K; 76 Sid Youngelman DE	Linebackers: 56 Archie Matsos MLB; 55 Marv Matuszak OLB; 58 Mike Stratton OLB; 85 John Tracey OLB; Defensive backs: 46 Ray Abruzzese SS; 43 Carl Charon FS; 24 Booker Edgerson CB; 25 Tom Minter CB; 47 Willie West CB	Reserve list: 33 Art Baker RB (IR); 46 Fred Brown RB (IR); 30 Wray Carlton RB (IR); 57 Ralph Felton LB (Retired); 75 Ken Rice T (IR); 23 Carl Taseff S (Retired)
*Note: rookies in italics

== Preseason ==
Week	Date	Opponent	Result	Record	Venue	Attendance
1	August 12	at New York Titans	W 20–10	1–0	Bowen Field	9,000
2	August 15	Boston Patriots	L 7–12	1–1	War Memorial Stadium	22,112
	August 18	New York Titans			America Stadium (Atlanta, Georgia)	
3	August 23	at Houston Oilers	W 24–14	2–1	Ladd Stadium	17,257
4	September 1	at Boston Patriots	W 7–6	3–1	Boston University Field	8,783

== Regular season ==
Week	Date	Opponent	Result	Record	Venue	Attendance	Recap
1	September 9	**Houston Oilers**	**L** 23–28	0–1	War Memorial Stadium	31,236	Recap
2	September 15	Denver Broncos	**L** 20–23	0–2	War Memorial Stadium	30,577	Recap
3	September 22	**New York Titans**	**L** 6–17	0–3	War Memorial Stadium	24,024	Recap
4	September 30	at Dallas Texans	**L** 21–41	0–4	Cotton Bowl	25,500	Recap
5	October 7	at **Houston Oilers**	**L** 14–17	0–5	Jeppesen Stadium	26,350	Recap
6	October 13	San Diego Chargers	**W** 35–10	1–5	War Memorial Stadium	20,074	Recap
7	October 20	Oakland Raiders	**W** 14–6	2–5	War Memorial Stadium	21,037	Recap
8	October 28	at Denver Broncos	**W** 45–38	3–5	Bears Stadium	26,051	Recap
9	November 3	**Boston Patriots**	**T** 28–28	3–5–1	War Memorial Stadium	33,247	Recap
10	November 11	at San Diego Chargers	**W** 40–20	4–5–1	Balboa Stadium	22,204	Recap
11	November 18	at Oakland Raiders	**W** 10–6	5–5–1	Frank Youell Field	11,700	Recap
12	November 23	at **Boston Patriots**	**L** 10–21	5–6–1	Boston University Field	20,021	Recap
13	December 2	Dallas Texans	**W** 23–14	6–6–1	War Memorial Stadium	35,261	Recap
14	December 8	at **New York Titans**	**W** 20–3	7–6–1	Polo Grounds	16,453	Recap
15	Bye						
Note: Intra-division opponents are in **bold** text.

== Standings ==
AFL Eastern Division
	W	L	T	PCT	DIV	PF	PA	STK
Houston Oilers	11	3	0	.786	5–1	387	270	W7
Boston Patriots	9	4	1	.692	4–1–1	346	295	L1
Buffalo Bills	7	6	1	.538	1–4–1	309	272	W2
New York Titans	5	9	0	.357	1–5	278	423	L3

Note: Tie games were not officially counted in the standings in the AFL.

=== Roster ===
Buffalo Bills roster
Quarterbacks Running backs Wide receivers Tight ends	Offensive linemen Defensive linemen Defensive backs Special teams
