= List of Buffalo Bills seasons =

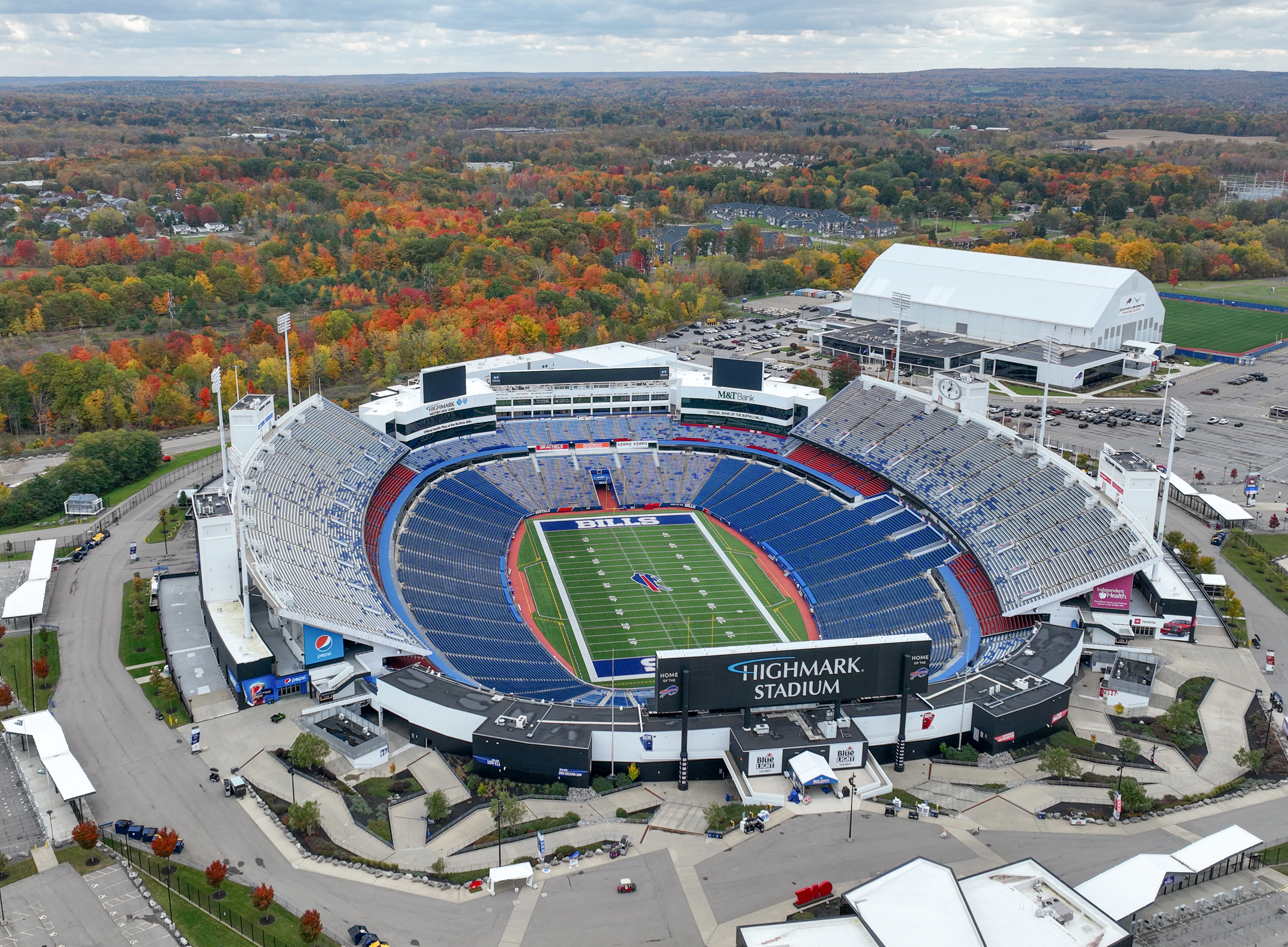
The Buffalo Bills played their home games at Highmark Stadium from 1973 to 2025.

The Buffalo Bills are a professional American football team based in the Buffalo–Niagara Falls metropolitan area. The Bills compete in the National Football League (NFL) as a member of the American Football Conference (AFC) East Division. Founded in 1959 by Ralph Wilson, they were a charter member of the American Football League (AFL) and joined the NFL in 1970 following the AFL–NFL merger. The Bills' name is derived from an All-America Football Conference franchise from Buffalo that was in turn named after western frontiersman Buffalo Bill. Since 1973 they have played their home games at Highmark Stadium in Orchard Park, New York.

In their time in the AFL from 1960 to 1969, the Bills reached the AFL Championship three consecutive times from 1964 to 1966, winning twice in 1964 and 1965. They did not return to the postseason until 1974 nor win a division title until 1980.

In the 1990 season, they won the AFC Championship to reach their first Super Bowl. They lost in Super Bowl XXV. They reached the next three Super Bowls with victories in the AFC Championship. They became the first team (and as of 2026, only team) to reach the Super Bowl four straight times.

As of the end of the 2025 season, the Bills have an all-time record of 498 wins, 510 losses, and 8 ties in the regular season, with an additional 21 wins and 22 losses in the playoffs. The team has had 30 winning seasons, 32 losing seasons, and 4 having as many wins as losses.

== Seasons ==
Legend
^{(#)}	The order of league championship won by the franchise
Finish	Final position in league, division, or conference
Pct	The team's winning percentage for the season
^{†}	AFL champions (1960–1969)
^{‡}	Super Bowl champions (1970–present)
^{*}	Conference champions
^{^}	Division champions
^{§}	Wild Card berth
^{°}	One-game playoff berth

Buffalo Bills record by season
Season	Team	League	Conference	Division	Regular season					Postseason results	Awards	Head coach	Refs
Season	Team	League	Conference	Division	Finish	W	L	T	Pct	Postseason results	Awards	Head coach	Refs
1960	1960	AFL		Eastern	3rd	5	8	1	.393			Buster Ramsey	
1961	1961	AFL		Eastern	4th	6	8	0	.429			Buster Ramsey	
1962	1962	AFL		Eastern	3rd	7	6	1	.536			Lou Saban	
1963	1963	AFL		Eastern	2nd°	7	6	1	.536	Lost Divisional Playoffs (Patriots) 26–8		Lou Saban	
1964	1964	AFL^{†}		Eastern^{^}	1st^{^}	12	2	0	.857	Won AFL Championship (1) (Chargers) 20–7	Lou Saban (COY)	Lou Saban	
1965	1965	AFL^{†}		Eastern^{^}	1st^{^}	10	3	1	.750	Won AFL Championship (2) (at Chargers) 23–0	Lou Saban (COY)	Lou Saban	
1966	1966	AFL		Eastern^{^}	1st^{^}	9	4	1	.679	Lost AFL Championship (Chiefs) 31–7	Bobby Burnett (ROY)	Joe Collier	
1967	1967	AFL		Eastern	3rd	4	10	0	.286			Joe Collier	
1968	1968	AFL		Eastern	5th	1	12	1	.107			Joe Collier (0–2) Harvey Johnson (1–10–1)	
1969	1969	AFL		Eastern	4th	4	10	0	.286			John Rauch	
1970	1970	NFL (Note: In 1970, the NFL and American Football League (AFL) officially merged in the AFL–NFL merger to form one league with two conferences. All ten former AFL teams as well as Pittsburgh, Cleveland, and Baltimore from the pre-merger NFL joined the AFC; the other thirteen remaining NFL teams joined the NFC. Each of those two were divided into three divisions: East, Central, and West.)	AFC	East	4th	3	10	1	.250		Dennis Shaw (OROY)	John Rauch	
1971	1971	NFL	AFC	East	5th	1	13	0	.071			Harvey Johnson	
1972	1972	NFL	AFC	East	4th	4	9	1	.321			Lou Saban	
1973	1973	NFL	AFC	East	2nd	9	5	0	.643		O. J. Simpson (MVP, OPOY)	Lou Saban	
1974	1974	NFL	AFC	East	2nd^{§}	9	5	0	.643	Lost Divisional Playoffs (at Steelers) 32–14		Lou Saban	
1975	1975	NFL	AFC	East	3rd	8	6	0	.571			Lou Saban	
1976	1976	NFL	AFC	East	5th	2	12	0	.143			Lou Saban (2–3) Jim Ringo (0–9)	
1977	1977	NFL	AFC	East	5th	3	11	0	.214			Jim Ringo	
1978	1978	NFL	AFC	East	4th	5	11	0	.313			Chuck Knox	(Note: In 1978, the NFL expanded its regular season schedule, which had been 14 games since 1961, to 16 games.)
1979	1979	NFL	AFC	East	4th	7	9	0	.438		Jim Haslett (DROY)	Chuck Knox	
1980	1980	NFL	AFC	East^{^}	1st^{^}	11	5	0	.688	Lost Divisional Playoffs (at Chargers) 20–14	Chuck Knox (COY)	Chuck Knox	
1981	1981	NFL	AFC	East	3rd^{§}	10	6	0	.625	Won Wild Card Playoffs (at Jets) 31–27; Lost Divisional Playoffs (at Bengals) 28–21		Chuck Knox	
1982	1982	NFL	AFC	None (Note: The 1982 season was shortened to nine games after a players' strike. The top eight teams in each conference advanced to the playoffs.)	9th	4	5	0	.444			Chuck Knox	
1983	1983	NFL	AFC	East	3rd	8	8	0	.500			Kay Stephenson	
1984	1984	NFL	AFC	East	5th	2	14	0	.125			Kay Stephenson	
1985	1985	NFL	AFC	East	5th	2	14	0	.125			Kay Stephenson (0–4) Hank Bullough (2–10)	
1986	1986	NFL	AFC	East	4th	4	12	0	.250			Hank Bullough (2–7) Marv Levy (2–5)	
1987	1987	NFL	AFC	East	4th	7	8	0	.467		Shane Conlan (DROY)	Marv Levy	(Note: The 1987 NFL strike caused the schedule to be reduced to 15 games.)
1988	1988	NFL	AFC	East^{^}	1st^{^}	12	4	0	.750	Won Divisional Playoffs (Oilers) 17–10; Lost AFC Championship (at Bengals) 21–10	Bill Polian (EOY)	Marv Levy	
1989	1989	NFL	AFC	East^{^}	1st^{^}	9	7	0	.563	Lost Divisional Playoffs (at Browns) 34–30		Marv Levy	
1990	1990	NFL	AFC^{*}	East^{^}	1st^{^}	13	3	0	.813	Won Divisional Playoffs (Dolphins) 44–34; Won AFC Championship (Raiders) 51–3; Lost Super Bowl XXV (vs. Giants) 20–19	Bruce Smith (DPOY)	Marv Levy	
1991	1991	NFL	AFC^{*}	East^{^}	1st^{^}	13	3	0	.813	Won Divisional Playoffs (Chiefs) 37–14; Won AFC Championship (Broncos) 10–7; Lost Super Bowl XXVI (vs. Redskins) 37–24	Thurman Thomas (MVP, OPOY); Bill Polian (EOY)	Marv Levy	
1992	1992	NFL	AFC^{*}	East	2nd^{§}	11	5	0	.688	Won Wild Card Playoffs (Oilers) 41–38 (OT); Won Divisional Playoffs (at Steelers) 24–3; Won AFC Championship (at Dolphins) 29–10; Lost Super Bowl XXVII (vs. Cowboys) 52–17		Marv Levy	
1993	1993	NFL	AFC^{*}	East^{^}	1st^{^}	12	4	0	.750	Won Divisional Playoffs (Raiders) 29–23; Won AFC Championship (Chiefs) 30–13; Lost Super Bowl XXVIII (vs. Cowboys) 30–13		Marv Levy	
1994	1994	NFL	AFC	East	4th	7	9	0	.438			Marv Levy	
1995	1995	NFL	AFC	East^{^}	1st^{^}	10	6	0	.625	Won Wild Card Playoffs (Dolphins) 37–22; Lost Divisional Playoffs (at Steelers) 40–21	Bryce Paup (DPOY)	Marv Levy	
1996	1996	NFL	AFC	East	2nd^{§}	10	6	0	.625	Lost Wild Card Playoffs (Jaguars) 30–27	Bruce Smith (DPOY)	Marv Levy	
1997	1997	NFL	AFC	East	4th	6	10	0	.375			Marv Levy	
1998	1998	NFL	AFC	East	3rd^{§}	10	6	0	.625	Lost Wild Card Playoffs (at Dolphins) 24–17		Wade Phillips	
1999	1999	NFL	AFC	East	2nd^{§}	11	5	0	.688	Lost Wild Card Playoffs (at Titans) 22–16		Wade Phillips	
2000	2000	NFL	AFC	East	4th	8	8	0	.500			Wade Phillips	
2001	2001	NFL	AFC	East	5th	3	13	0	.188			Gregg Williams	
2002	2002	NFL	AFC	East (Note: In 2002, the NFL realigned to create four divisions in both conferences with four teams in each division. The Bills did not change divisions, but their division did change from five teams to four.)	4th	8	8	0	.500			Gregg Williams	
2003	2003	NFL	AFC	East	3rd	6	10	0	.375			Gregg Williams	
2004	2004	NFL	AFC	East	3rd	9	7	0	.563			Mike Mularkey	
2005	2005	NFL	AFC	East	3rd	5	11	0	.313			Mike Mularkey	
2006	2006	NFL	AFC	East	3rd	7	9	0	.438			Dick Jauron	
2007	2007	NFL	AFC	East	2nd	7	9	0	.438			Dick Jauron	
2008	2008	NFL	AFC	East	4th	7	9	0	.438			Dick Jauron	
2009	2009	NFL	AFC	East	4th	6	10	0	.375			Dick Jauron (3–6) Perry Fewell (3–4)	
2010	2010	NFL	AFC	East	4th	4	12	0	.250			Chan Gailey	
2011	2011	NFL	AFC	East	4th	6	10	0	.375			Chan Gailey	
2012	2012	NFL	AFC	East	4th	6	10	0	.375			Chan Gailey	
2013	2013	NFL	AFC	East	4th	6	10	0	.375			Doug Marrone	
2014	2014	NFL	AFC	East	2nd	9	7	0	.563			Doug Marrone	
2015	2015	NFL	AFC	East	3rd	8	8	0	.500			Rex Ryan	
2016	2016	NFL	AFC	East	3rd	7	9	0	.438			Rex Ryan (7–8) Anthony Lynn (0–1)	
2017	2017	NFL	AFC	East	2nd^{§}	9	7	0	.563	Lost Wild Card Playoffs (at Jaguars) 10–3		Sean McDermott	
2018	2018	NFL	AFC	East	3rd	6	10	0	.375			Sean McDermott	
2019	2019	NFL	AFC	East	2nd^{§}	10	6	0	.625	Lost Wild Card Playoffs (at Texans) 22–19 (OT)		Sean McDermott	
2020	2020	NFL	AFC	East^{^}	1st^{^}	13	3	0	.813	Won Wild Card Playoffs (Colts) 27–24; Won Divisional Playoffs (Ravens) 17–3; Lost AFC Championship (at Chiefs) 38–24	Brandon Beane (EOY)	Sean McDermott	
2021	2021	NFL	AFC	East^{^}	1st^{^}	11	6	0	.647	Won Wild Card Playoffs (Patriots) 47–17; Lost Divisional Playoffs (at Chiefs) 42–36 (OT)		Sean McDermott	(Note: In 2021, the NFL expanded its regular season schedule, which had been 16 games since 1978, to 17 games.)
2022	2022	NFL	AFC	East^{^}	1st^{^}	13	3	0	.813	Won Wild Card Playoffs (Dolphins) 34–31; Lost Divisional Playoffs (Bengals) 27–10	Brandon Beane (EOY)	Sean McDermott	
2023	2023	NFL	AFC	East^{^}	1st^{^}	11	6	0	.647	Won Wild Card Playoffs (Steelers) 31–17; Lost Divisional Playoffs (Chiefs) 27–24		Sean McDermott	
2024	2024	NFL	AFC	East^{^}	1st^{^}	13	4	0	.765	Won Wild Card Playoffs (Broncos) 31–7; Won Divisional Playoffs (Ravens) 27–25; Lost AFC Championship (at Chiefs) 32–29	Josh Allen (MVP)	Sean McDermott	
2025	2025	NFL	AFC	East	2nd^{§}	12	5	0	.706	Won Wild Card Playoffs (at Jaguars) 27–24; Lost Divisional Playoffs (at Broncos) 33–30 (OT)		Sean McDermott	
Totals 2 AFL Championship 4 AFC Conference Championship 15 Division titles						498	510	8	.494	All-time regular season record (1960–2025)			
Totals 2 AFL Championship 4 AFC Conference Championship 15 Division titles						22	23	—	.489	All-time postseason record (1960–2025)			
Totals 2 AFL Championship 4 AFC Conference Championship 15 Division titles						520	533	8	.494	All-time regular & postseason record (1960–2025)			

Note: Statistics are up to date January 17, 2026.

== See also ==
- History of the Buffalo Bills
