= 1960 New York Titans season =

Inaugural season for New York's AFL franchise

- Owner: Harry Wismer
- General manager: Steve Sebo
- Head coach: Sammy Baugh
- Home stadium: Polo Grounds

Results
- Record: 7–7
- Division place: 2nd AFL East
- Playoffs: Did not qualify

The 1960 New York Titans season was the inaugural season for the team in the upstart American Football League (AFL). The team began play in the Polo Grounds, the one-time home of the National Football League (NFL)'s New York Giants. The Titans finished their first season at a respectable 7–7.

== Offseason ==
=== Undrafted free agents ===
1960 undrafted free agents of note
Player	Position	College
Ron Newhouse	Quarterback	St. Norbert

== Roster ==
1960 New York Titans roster
Quarterbacks (QB): 12 Al Dorow P; 15 Dick Jamieson; 19 Bob Scrabis; Running backs (RB): 24 Leon Burton; 26 Dewey Bohling; 33 Pete Hart; 31 Bill Mathis; 40 Joe Pagliei P; 29 Bill Shockley K; Wide receivers (WR): 20 Don Herndon; 13 Don Maynard; 84 Art Powell; Tight ends (TE): 88 Thurlow Cooper; 80 Dave Ross	Offensive linemen (OL): 61 Dan Callahan G; 70 Gene Cockrell T; 52 Mike Hudock C; 78 Jack Klotz T; 67 Bob Mischak G/T; 68 John McMullan G; Defensive linemen (DL): 82 Ed Cooke DE; 72 Dick Guesman DT; 74 Nick Mumley DE; 79 Bob Reifsnyder DE; 75 Tom Saidock DT; 76 Sid Youngelman DT	Linebackers (LB): 25 Eddie Bell OLB; 56 Roger Ellis MLB/C; 60 Larry Grantham OLB; Defensive backs (DB): 45 Corky Tharp FS; 23 Dick Felt CB; 28 Charlie Dupre FS; 39 Fred Julian CB; 35 Roger Donnahoo SS; Special teams (ST)	Reserve: 55 Bob Marques LB (IR); Rookies in italics

== Schedule ==
Week	Date	Opponent	Result	Record	Venue	Attendance	Recap
1	September 11	**Buffalo Bills**	**W** 27–3	1–0	Polo Grounds	10,250	Recap
2	September 17	**Boston Patriots**	**L** 24–28	1–1	Polo Grounds	19,200	Recap
3	September 23	Denver Broncos	**W** 28–24	2–1	Polo Grounds	20,982	Recap
4	October 2	at Dallas Texans	**W** 37–35	3–1	Cotton Bowl	37,500	Recap
5	October 9	at **Houston Oilers**	**L** 21–27	3–2	Jeppesen Stadium	16,156	Recap
6	October 16	at **Buffalo Bills**	**W** 17–13	4–2	War Memorial Stadium	14,998	Recap
7	October 23	**Houston Oilers**	**L** 28–42	4–3	Polo Grounds	21,000	Recap
8	October 28	Oakland Raiders	**L** 27–28	4–4	Polo Grounds	10,000	Recap
9	November 4	Los Angeles Chargers	**L** 7–21	4–5	Polo Grounds	19,402	Recap
10	November 11	at **Boston Patriots**	**L** 21–38	4–6	Boston University Field	11,653	Recap
11	Bye						
12	November 24	Dallas Texans	**W** 41–35	5–6	Polo Grounds	14,344	Recap
13	December 4	at Denver Broncos	**W** 30–27	6–6	Bears Stadium	5,861	Recap
14	December 11	at Oakland Raiders	**W** 31–28	7–6	Candlestick Park	9,037	Recap
15	December 18	at Los Angeles Chargers	**L** 43–50	7–7	Los Angeles Memorial Coliseum	11,457	Recap
Note: Intra-division opponents are in **bold** text.

== Season summary ==
=== Week 1 vs Bills ===
Week One: Buffalo Bills (0–0) at New York Titans (0–0)

Quarter	1	2	3	4	Total
Bills	3	0	0	0	3
Titans	0	17	3	7	27

at Polo Grounds, New York, New York

- Date: September 11
- Game weather: 65 °F (18 °C)
- Game attendance: 10,200
- Box Score

Game information

First quarter

- BUF – Darrell Harper 35-yard field goal. Bills 3-0. Drive:

Second quarter

- NY – Bill Shockley 15-yard field goal. Tie 3–3. Drive:
- NY – Al Dorow 2-yard run (Bill Shockley kick). Titans 10–3. Drive:
- NY – Al Dorow 15-yard run (Bill Shockley kick). Titans 17–3. Drive:

Third quarter

- NY – Bill Shockley 39-yard field goal. Titans 20–3. Drive:

Fourth quarter

- NY – Art Powell 13-yard pass from Dick Jamieson (Bill Shockley kick). Titans 27–3. Drive:

Top passers

- BUF – Tommy O'Connell – 2/10, 37 yards, INT
- NY – Dick Jamieson – 9/18, 152 yards, TD

Top rushers

- BUF – Bob Brodhead – 4 rushes, 42 yards
- NY – Pete Hart – 11 rushes, 66 yards

Top receivers

- BUF – Elbert Dubenion – 1 reception, 22 yards
- NY – Don Maynard – 4 receptions, 116 yards

=== Week 6 at Bills ===
Week Six: New York Titans (3–2) at Buffalo Bills (1–3)

Quarter	1	2	3	4	Total
Titans	7	3	0	7	17
Bills	6	0	0	7	13

at War Memorial Stadium, Buffalo, New York

- Date: October 16
- Game weather: 58 °F (14 °C)
- Game attendance: 14,988
- Box Score

Game information

First quarter

- NY – Thurlow Cooper 3-yard pass from Al Dorow (Bill Shockley kick). Titans 7–0. Drive:
- BUF – Wray Carlton 54-yard run (kick failed). Titans 7–6. Drive:

Second quarter

- NY – Bill Shockley 43-yard field goal. Titans 10–6. Drive:

Third quarter

- No scoring

Fourth quarter

- BUF – Elbert Dubenion 32-yard pass from Johnny Green (Billy Atkins kick). Bills 13–10. Drive:
- NY – Al Dorow 1-yard run (Bill Shockley kick). Titans 17–13. Drive:

Top passers

- NY – Al Dorow – 16/35, 158 yards, TD, 3 INT
- BUF – Johnny Green – 10/24, 127 yards, TD, 2 INT

Top rushers

- NY – Al Dorow – 18 rushes, 72 yards, TD
- BUF – Wray Carlton – 9 rushes, 98 yards, TD

Top receivers

- NY – Don Maynard – 6 receptions, 82 yards
- BUF – Elbert Dubenion – 3 receptions, 46 yards, TD

== Standings ==
AFL Eastern Division
	W	L	T	PCT	DIV	PF	PA	STK
Houston Oilers	10	4	0	.714	5–1	379	285	W2
New York Titans	7	7	0	.500	2–4	382	399	L1
Buffalo Bills	5	8	1	.385	3–3	296	303	L2
Boston Patriots	5	9	0	.357	2–4	286	349	L4

Note: Tie games were not officially counted in the standings in the AFL.
