= AFC East =

Division in the American Football Conference

- Conference: American Football Conference
- League: National Football League
- Sport: American football
- Founded: 1960 (as the American Football League Eastern Division)
- No. of teams: 4
- Most recent champion: New England Patriots (23rd title) (2025)
- Most titles: New England Patriots (23 titles)

AFC East Teams Location

The American Football Conference – Eastern Division or AFC East is one of the four divisions of the American Football Conference (AFC) in the National Football League (NFL). There are currently four teams that reside in the division: the Buffalo Bills, the Miami Dolphins, the New England Patriots, and the New York Jets. All four members of the AFC East were previously members of the Eastern Division of the American Football League (AFL).

Both perfect regular seasons in professional football since the adoption of a 14-game schedule in the inaugural AFL season and by the NFL in 1961 have been achieved by teams in this division — the 1972 Dolphins, who completed the only perfect season in professional football at 17–0, and the 2007 Patriots, who finished 18–1 after losing Super Bowl XLII. (Note: The other two perfect regular seasons in NFL history were both by the Chicago Bears – currently of the NFC North – in 1934 and 1942 – although in both seasons the Bears lost their sole playoff game.) Since the division's establishment in 1960, with the creation of the AFL, the division has been represented in 22 Super Bowls and won 11 of them. The most recent appearance in the Super Bowl by an AFC East team was the Patriots loss in Super Bowl LX. Among the current teams, they have a total of nine Super Bowl titles: six for the Patriots, two for the Dolphins, and one for the Jets.

The current champions of the AFC East are the New England Patriots. Previously, the Patriots had won eleven consecutively from 2009 through 2019. The Patriots have won the most AFL/AFC East titles, at 23; followed by the Bills at 15 (who also had the best record in the East during the strike shortened 1982 season when divisions were scrapped for a seeded playoffs) and the Dolphins at 13. The Jets have won four. Two teams formerly in the division combined for ten AFL/AFC East titles — the Houston Oilers (now the Tennessee Titans) won four division titles (and the 1960 and 1961 AFL titles) during the AFL era while the Baltimore–Indianapolis Colts won six division titles (and Super Bowl V) in the 32 seasons they were in the division.

The AFC East teams have won 26 AFL or AFC championships: including 11 by the Patriots, six by the Bills, and five by the Dolphins. The Oilers won two; the Jets and Colts won one each.

== AFL Eastern Division ==
The American Football League Eastern Division was formed during the inaugural season of the American Football League in 1960, as a counterpart to the AFL Western Division. The divisional alignment consisted of the Buffalo Bills, Boston Patriots, New York Titans and Houston Oilers. The Miami Dolphins entered the AFL in 1966 as part of its Eastern division.

The division was absorbed nearly intact with the AFL–NFL merger in 1970, but Houston was moved to the AFC Central (formerly the NFL Century Division, now the AFC North) and replaced by the closer Baltimore Colts (from the NFL Coastal Division, which became the NFC West). Despite relocating to Indianapolis, Indiana in 1984, the Colts continued to play in the AFC East until NFL expansion from 31 to 32 teams with the addition of the Houston Texans (successor club in Houston to the Oilers) and 2002 re-alignment when they were moved to the AFC South (the successor franchise to the Oilers, the Tennessee Titans, is also in the AFC South).

Although Miami is further south than the home cities of the other three teams, all of which are in the Northeast, all four AFC East teams have historical rivalries among them, dating from their years in the AFL during the 1960s. All four teams in this division are based in the Eastern Time Zone.

None of the AFC East teams currently play within the central city of their metropolitan area (in New England's case, they also reflect the region they are based in):

- The Bills play in Orchard Park, New York; they played in the city of Buffalo from 1960 to 1972.
- The Jets play in East Rutherford, New Jersey (and share a stadium with the New York Giants; they played in the New York City borough of Manhattan from 1960 to 1963, and in the borough of Queens from 1964 to 1983).
- The Dolphins play in Miami Gardens, Florida, a suburb of Miami (Miami Gardens was separated from the city itself and incorporated in 2003). The Dolphins also played in the Miami neighborhood of Little Havana from 1966 to 1986 when they played at the Orange Bowl.
- The Patriots play in Foxborough, Massachusetts (they played in Boston, the largest city in New England, until 1970 and adopted their current name in 1971 when they moved into what eventually became known as Foxboro Stadium).

Almost analogously, three out of the four NFC East teams do not actually play within the city of their naming (only the Philadelphia Eagles do so).

All of the teams are or were coached by a first or second-generation member of the Bill Parcells coaching tree: the Patriots had Bill Belichick; the Dolphins had Tony Sparano; the Jets had Eric Mangini (who served as an assistant with both Belichick and Parcells); and the Bills had Dick Jauron (fired on November 17, 2009), who served as an assistant with former Parcells assistant Tom Coughlin. The Jets were coached by Todd Bowles (2015–2018) and the Bills were coached by Rex Ryan for 31 games (the entire 2015–16 season, and he was fired before the last game of the 2016–17 season and replaced with interim Head Coach Anthony Lynn). Parcells himself coached the Patriots (1993–96) and the Jets (1997–99) and was Vice President of Football Operations for the Dolphins until the summer of 2010.

ESPN's Chris Berman often calls this division the "AFC Adams" due to its geographical similarity to the old Adams Division of the NHL, now succeeded by the Atlantic Division.

Along with the AFC (formerly AFL) West, the AFC East is the oldest NFL division in terms of creation date (1960).

== Results ==
=== Team success ===
Team success
Team	Years in division	Playoff berths	Division championships	AFC Championship Game appearances	Super Bowl appearances	Super Bowl wins	Refs
Buffalo Bills	1960–present	23	15	7	4	0	
New England Patriots	1960–present	28	23	16	12	6	
New York Jets	1960–present	14	4	4	1	1	
Miami Dolphins	1966–present	24	13	7	5	2	
Indianapolis Colts	1970–2001	10	6	3	1	1	
Houston Oilers	1960–1969	5	4	0	0	0	

=== Season-by-season ===
^{(#)}	Denotes team that won the Super Bowl
^{(#)}	Denotes team that won the AFC Championship
^{(#)}	Denotes team that won the AFL Championship
^{(#)}	Denotes team that qualified for the NFL Playoffs or AFL Playoffs

Season	Team (record)				
Season	1st	2nd	3rd	4th	5th
AFL Eastern
1960: The AFL was established with 8 teams. The Boston Patriots, Buffalo Bills, Houston Oilers, and New York Titans comprised the Eastern Division.
1960	Houston (10–4)	N.Y. Titans (7–7)	Buffalo (5–8–1)	Boston (5–9)	
1961	Houston (10–3–1)	Boston (9–4–1)	N.Y. Titans (7–7)	Buffalo (6–8)	
1962	Houston (11–3)	Boston (9–4–1)	Buffalo (7–6–1)	N.Y. Titans (5–9)	
1963: The New York Titans renamed as the New York Jets
1963	Boston (7–6–1)	Buffalo (7–6–1)	Houston (6–8)	N.Y. Jets (5–8–1)	
1964	Buffalo (12–2)	Boston (10–3–1)	N.Y. Jets (5–8–1)	Houston (4–10)	
1965	Buffalo (10–3–1)	N.Y. Jets (5–8–1)	Boston (4–8–2)	Houston (4–10)	
1966: An expansion team, Miami Dolphins joined AFL Eastern.
1966	Buffalo (9–4–1)	Boston (8–4–2)	N.Y. Jets (6–6–2)	Houston (3–11)	Miami (3–11)
1967	Houston (9–4–1)	N.Y. Jets (8–5–1)	Buffalo (4–10)	Miami (4–10)	Boston (3–10–1)
1968	N.Y. Jets (11–3)	Houston (7–7)	Miami (5–8–1)	Boston (4–10)	Buffalo (1–12–1)
1969	N.Y. Jets (10–4)	Houston (6–6–2)	Boston (4–10)	Buffalo (4–10)	Miami (3–10–1)
AFC East
1970: As part of AFL–NFL merger, AFL Eastern adopted its current name with the Houston Oilers moving to the AFC Central while the Baltimore Colts moved in from the NFL Coastal.
1970	Baltimore (11–2–1)	Miami (10–4)	N.Y. Jets (4–10)	Buffalo (3–10–1)	Boston (2–12)
1971: The Boston Patriots were renamed as the New England Patriots
1971	Miami (10–3–1)	Baltimore (10–4)	New England (6–8)	N.Y. Jets (6–8)	Buffalo (1–13)
1972	Miami (14–0)	N.Y. Jets (7–7)	Baltimore (5–9)	Buffalo (4–9–1)	New England (3–11)
1973	Miami (12–2)	Buffalo (9–5)	New England (5–9)	N.Y. Jets (4–10)	Baltimore (4–10)
1974	Miami (11–3)	Buffalo (9–5)	New England (7–7)	N.Y. Jets (7–7)	Baltimore (2–12)
1975	^{(3)} Baltimore (10–4)	Miami (10–4)	Buffalo (8–6)	N.Y. Jets (3–11)	New England (3–11)
1976	^{(2)} Baltimore (11–3)	^{(4)} New England (11–3)	Miami (6–8)	N.Y. Jets (3–11)	Buffalo (2–12)
1977	^{(2)} Baltimore (10–4)	Miami (10–4)	New England (9–5)	Buffalo (3–11)	N.Y. Jets (3–11)
1978	^{(2)} New England (11–5)	^{(4)} Miami (11–5)	N.Y. Jets (8–8)	Buffalo (5–11)	Baltimore (5–11)
1979	^{(3)} Miami (10–6)	New England (9–7)	N.Y. Jets (8–8)	Buffalo (7–9)	Baltimore (5–11)
1980	^{(3)} Buffalo (11–5)	New England (10–6)	Miami (8–8)	Baltimore (7–9)	N.Y. Jets (4–12)
1981	^{(2)} Miami (11–4–1)	^{(4)} N.Y. Jets (10–5–1)	^{(5)} Buffalo (10–6)	Baltimore (2–14)	New England (2–14)
1982^	^{(2)} Miami (7–2)	^{(6)} N.Y. Jets (6–3)	^{(7)} New England (5–4)	Buffalo (4–5)	Baltimore (0–8–1)
1983	^{(2)} Miami (12–4)	New England (8–8)	Buffalo (8–8)	Baltimore (7–9)	N.Y. Jets (7–9)
1984: The Baltimore Colts moved to Indianapolis and became the Indianapolis Colts.
1984	^{(1)} Miami (14–2)	New England (9–7)	N.Y. Jets (7–9)	Indianapolis (4–12)	Buffalo (2–14)
1985	^{(2)} Miami (12–4)	^{(4)} N.Y. Jets (11–5)	^{(5)} New England (11–5)	Indianapolis (5–11)	Buffalo (2–14)
1986	^{(3)} New England (11–5)	^{(4)} N.Y. Jets (10–6)	Miami (8–8)	Buffalo (4–12)	Indianapolis (3–13)
1987	^{(3)} Indianapolis (9–6)	New England (8–7)	Miami (8–7)	Buffalo (7–8)	N.Y. Jets (6–9)
1988	^{(2)} Buffalo (12–4)	Indianapolis (9–7)	New England (9–7)	N.Y. Jets (8–7–1)	Miami (6–10)
1989	^{(3)} Buffalo (9–7)	Indianapolis (8–8)	Miami (8–8)	New England (5–11)	N.Y. Jets (4–12)
1990	^{(1)} Buffalo (13–3)	^{(4)} Miami (12–4)	Indianapolis (7–9)	N.Y. Jets (6–10)	New England (1–15)
1991	^{(1)} Buffalo (13–3)	^{(6)} N.Y. Jets (8–8)	Miami (8–8)	New England (6–10)	Indianapolis (1–15)
1992	^{(2)} Miami (11–5)	^{(4)} Buffalo (11–5)	Indianapolis (9–7)	N.Y. Jets (4–12)	New England (2–14)
1993	^{(1)} Buffalo (12–4)	Miami (9–7)	N.Y. Jets (8–8)	New England (5–11)	Indianapolis (4–12)
1994	^{(3)} Miami (10–6)	^{(5)} New England (10–6)	Indianapolis (8–8)	Buffalo (7–9)	N.Y. Jets (6–10)
1995	^{(3)} Buffalo (10–6)	^{(5)} Indianapolis (9–7)	^{(6)} Miami (9–7)	New England (6–10)	N.Y. Jets (3–13)
1996	^{(2)} New England (11–5)	^{(4)} Buffalo (10–6)	^{(6)} Indianapolis (9–7)	Miami (8–8)	N.Y. Jets (1–15)
1997	^{(3)} New England (10–6)	^{(6)} Miami (9–7)	N.Y. Jets (9–7)	Buffalo (6–10)	Indianapolis (3–13)
1998	^{(2)} N.Y. Jets (12–4)	^{(4)} Miami (10–6)	^{(5)} Buffalo (10–6)	^{(6)} New England (9–7)	Indianapolis (3–13)
1999	^{(2)} Indianapolis (13–3)	^{(5)} Buffalo (11–5)	^{(6)} Miami (9–7)	N.Y. Jets (8–8)	New England (8–8)
2000	^{(3)} Miami (11–5)	^{(6)} Indianapolis (10–6)	N.Y. Jets (9–7)	Buffalo (8–8)	New England (5–11)
2001	^{(2)} New England (11–5)	^{(4)} Miami (11–5)	^{(6)} N.Y. Jets (10–6)	Indianapolis (6–10)	Buffalo (3–13)
2002: As part of the 2002 realignment, the Indianapolis Colts moved to the newly formed AFC South.
2002	^{(4)} N.Y. Jets (9–7)	New England (9–7)	Miami (9–7)	Buffalo (8–8)	
2003	^{(1)} New England (14–2)	Miami (10–6)	Buffalo (6–10)	N.Y. Jets (6–10)	
2004	^{(2)} New England (14–2)	^{(5)} N.Y. Jets (10–6)	Buffalo (9–7)	Miami (4–12)	
2005	^{(4)} New England (10–6)	Miami (9–7)	Buffalo (5–11)	N.Y. Jets (4–12)	
2006	^{(4)} New England (12–4)	^{(5)} N.Y. Jets (10–6)	Buffalo (7–9)	Miami (6–10)	
2007	^{(1)} New England (16–0)	Buffalo (7–9)	N.Y. Jets (4–12)	Miami (1–15)	
2008	^{(3)} Miami (11–5)	New England (11–5)	N.Y. Jets (9–7)	Buffalo (7–9)	
2009	^{(3)} New England (10–6)	^{(5)} N.Y. Jets (9–7)	Miami (7–9)	Buffalo (6–10)	
2010	^{(1)} New England (14–2)	^{(6)} N.Y. Jets (11–5)	Miami (7–9)	Buffalo (4–12)	
2011	^{(1)} New England (13–3)	N.Y. Jets (8–8)	Miami (6–10)	Buffalo (6–10)	
2012	^{(2)} New England (12–4)	Miami (7–9)	N.Y. Jets (6–10)	Buffalo (6–10)	
2013	^{(2)} New England (12–4)	N.Y. Jets (8–8)	Miami (8–8)	Buffalo (6–10)	
2014	^{(1)} New England (12–4)	Buffalo (9–7)	Miami (8–8)	N.Y. Jets (4–12)	
2015	^{(2)} New England (12–4)	N.Y. Jets (10–6)	Buffalo (8–8)	Miami (6–10)	
2016	^{(1)} New England (14–2)	^{(6)} Miami (10–6)	Buffalo (7–9)	N.Y. Jets (5–11)	
2017	^{(1)} New England (13–3)	^{(6)} Buffalo (9–7)	Miami (6–10)	N.Y. Jets (5–11)	
2018	^{(2)} New England (11–5)	Miami (7–9)	Buffalo (6–10)	N.Y. Jets (4–12)	
2019	^{(3)} New England (12–4)	^{(5)} Buffalo (10–6)	N.Y. Jets (7–9)	Miami (5–11)	
2020	^{(2)} Buffalo (13–3)	Miami (10–6)	New England (7–9)	N.Y. Jets (2–14)	
2021	^{(3)} Buffalo (11–6)	^{(6)} New England (10–7)	Miami (9–8)	N.Y. Jets (4–13)	
2022	^{(2)} Buffalo (13–3)	^{(7)} Miami (9–8)	New England (8–9)	N.Y. Jets (7–10)	
2023	^{(2)} Buffalo (11–6)	^{(6)} Miami (11–6)	N.Y. Jets (7–10)	New England (4–13)	
2024	^{(2)} Buffalo (13–4)	Miami (8–9)	N.Y. Jets (5–12)	New England (4–13)	
2025	^{(2)} New England (14–3)	^{(6)} Buffalo (12–5)	Miami (7–10)	N.Y. Jets (3–14)	
2026	Buffalo (8–1)	New England (5–5)	N.Y. Jets (2–8)	Miami (1–8)	

== See also ==
- Bills–Dolphins rivalry
- Bills–Jets rivalry
- Bills–Patriots rivalry
- Dolphins–Jets rivalry
- Dolphins–Patriots rivalry
- Jets–Patriots rivalry

=== Former member rivalries ===
- Colts–Patriots rivalry
