= Elbert Dubenion =

American football player (1933–2019)

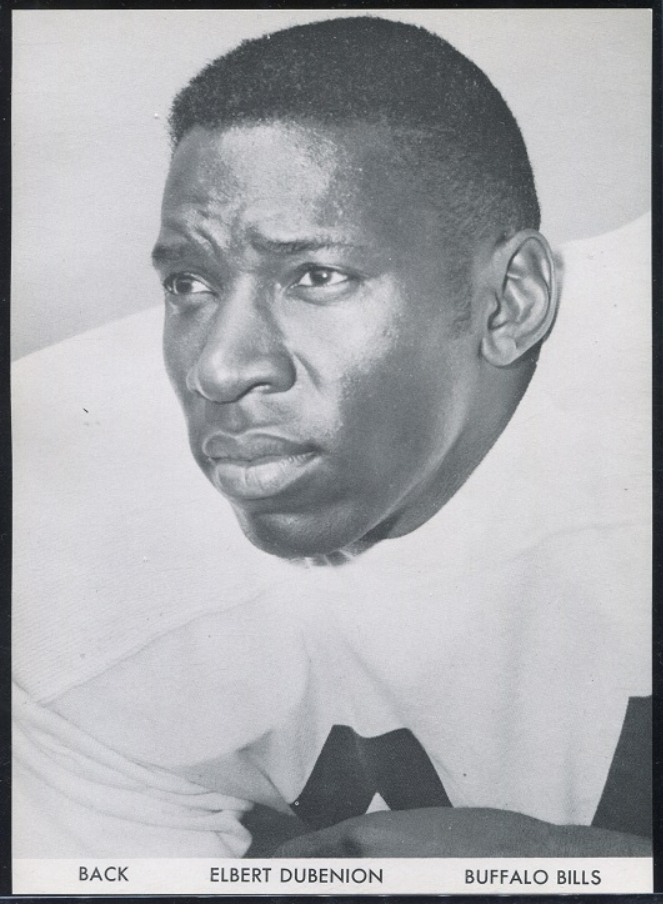
- Dubenion in 1960

No. 44
- Position: Flanker

Personal information
- Born: February 16, 1933; Griffin, Georgia, U.S.
- Died: December 26, 2019 (aged 86); Westerville, Ohio, U.S.
- Listed height: 5 ft 11 in (1.80 m)
- Listed weight: 187 lb (85 kg)

Career information
- High school: South (Columbus, Ohio)
- College: Bluffton
- NFL draft: 1959: 14th round, 167th overall pick

Career history
- Cleveland Browns (1959)*; Buffalo Bills (1960–1968)
- * Offseason or practice squad member only

Awards and highlights
- 2× AFL champion (1964, 1965); 2× Second-team All-AFL (1963, 1964); AFL All-Star (1964); Buffalo Bills Wall of Fame

Career AFL statistics
- Receptions: 294
- Receiving yards: 5,294
- Receiving touchdowns: 35
- Stats at Pro Football Reference

Elbert "Golden Wheels" Dubenion (February 16, 1933 – December 26, 2019) was an American football flanker who spent his entire nine-season professional career with the Buffalo Bills of the American Football League (AFL). He played college football for the Bluffton Beavers.

Dubenion, the longest-tenured member of the team's inaugural roster despite being 27 years old at the start of his professional career, is considered one of the most exciting players in team history, an archetype of the AFL's emphasis on offense and the long pass.

Dubenion was widely known for his raw speed and unreliable hands, the former of which earned him the nickname "Golden Wheels" in his 1960 Bills debut. That's when quarterback Johnny Green said of his fellow rookie teammate, “Man can’t catch, but he’s got those golden wheels.” The unique nickname stayed with Dubenion for the rest of his career.

== Career ==
Dubenion was drafted in the fourteenth round of the 1959 NFL draft by the Cleveland Browns of the National Football League. His relatively old age (26 at the time) and hailing from a smaller college meant that he was never considered a serious prospect, and the Browns released him prior to the start of the season.

Dubenion was among many AFL players from smaller and less renowned colleges that the league was signing in search of talent that the NFL had overlooked, and the Buffalo Bills signed him as a free agent. In his rookie season, Dubenion had seven touchdowns and 752 receiving yards on 42 receptions, averaging 17.9 yards per reception. He rushed 16 times for 94 yards and a touchdown, averaging 5.9 yards per rush.

In 1961, facing tighter and deeper coverages, he upped his production as a runner, rushing for 173 yards and a touchdown on just 17 carries, averaging 10.2 yards per rush. He had 461 receiving yards and six touchdowns on 31 receptions, averaging 14.9 yards per reception.

In 1964, Dubenion had one of the most sensational seasons of any receiver in pro football history, scoring 10 touchdowns on 42 receptions for 1,139 yards, while collecting 27.1 yards per reception. His 42 receptions is the least amount for a 1,000-yard receiving season in pro football history and his 27.1 yards per catch is the most for a 1,000-yard season.

In nine seasons, he totaled 294 receptions for 5,294 yards and 35 TDs for a career average of 18.0 yards per reception, and rushed for 326 yards and three touchdowns on 46 carries, a career average of 7.1 yards per rush. When Wray Carlton was released by the Bills on September 2, 1968, it made Dubenion the last player from the Bills' original roster in 1960 to still be with the club.

Dubenion ranks seventh all-time in the AFL in receptions and reception yardage. He holds the record for the longest reception in AFL playoff history, a 93-yard touchdown reception from quarterback Daryle Lamonica against the Boston Patriots in the 1963 Eastern Division playoff.

According to Sports Reference, a player must have at least 8 career playoff receptions to qualify for the all-time NFL leaderboard for career yards per reception in the playoffs. Dubenion has exactly 8 receptions for 250 yards in the playoffs for an average of 31.3 yards per reception, more than any other player in the history of the NFL; the closest player to him is Jim Doran, who averaged 27.4 yards per reception, 3.9 fewer than Dubenion.

Dubenion was a 1993 inductee of the Greater Buffalo Sports Hall of Fame, and his number 44 is officially in "reduced circulation" on the Bills, meaning, although it is not officially retired, the team usually does not allow players who are expected to make the team's regular season roster to wear it. (This has not always been successful; Joe Andreessen unexpectedly made the Bills roster wearing the number 44 and currently wears the number as of 2024.)

== Death ==
Dubenion died December 26, 2019, from complications related to Parkinson's disease.

== AFL career statistics ==
Legend
	Won the AFL championship
	Led the league
**Bold**	Career high

=== Regular season ===
Year	Team	Games		Receiving				
Year	Team	GP	GS	Rec	Yds	Avg	Lng	TD
1960	BUF	14	14	42	752	17.9	76	7
1961	BUF	14	13	31	461	14.9	61	6
1962	BUF	14	14	33	571	17.3	75	5
1963	BUF	14	14	**53**	959	18.1	**89**	4
1964	BUF	14	13	42	**1,139**	**27.1**	72	**10**
1965	BUF	3	3	18	281	15.6	46	1
1966	BUF	14	14	50	747	14.9	46	2
1967	BUF	12	11	25	384	15.4	42	0
1968	BUF	4	1	Did not record any stats				
Career		103	97	294	5,294	18.0	89	35

== See also ==
- List of American Football League players
