= Dewey Bohling =

American football player (1938–2025)

No. 26
- Position: Running back

Personal information
- Born: August 22, 1938; Athens, Ohio, U.S.
- Died: October 19, 2025 (aged 87); Albuquerque, New Mexico, U.S.
- Listed height: 5 ft 11 in (1.80 m)
- Listed weight: 190 lb (86 kg)

Career information
- High school: Highland (Albuquerque)
- College: Hardin–Simmons
- NFL draft: 1959: 13th round, 151st overall pick

Career history
- New York Titans (1960–1961); Buffalo Bills (1961)

Career AFL statistics
- Rushing yards: 584
- Rushing average: 3.3
- Receptions: 43
- Receiving yards: 485
- Total touchdowns: 9
- Stats at Pro Football Reference

Dewey Arthur Bohling (August 22, 1938 – October 19, 2025) was an American professional football player who was a halfback in the American Football League (AFL). He played college football for the Hardin–Simmons Cowboys, and played in the AFL for the New York Titans and the Buffalo Bills from 1960 to 1961.

== College career ==
Bohling played his college football at Hardin–Simmons University, where he played under Sammy Baugh. In his first season for the varsity club, Bohling played in 10 games for the Cowboys, rushing 47 times for 280 yards and six touchdowns. He also caught a scoring pass from quarterback Gene Saur as well. In 1957, Hardin-Simmons improved to 5–5 under Baugh. Bohling continued to be a threat at running back. This time, he carried the ball 104 times and rushed for 470 yards and three scores. And Bohling was deployed more as a receiver. In 1957, he 13 caught passes for 128 yards and caught his second career touchdown as well. In 1958, Bohling would rush for 451 on 84 carries and four scores. Hardin-Simmons improved to 6–5 and went 4–0 in conference play.

== Professional career ==
In the 1959 NFL draft, Bohling was selected in the 13th round by the Pittsburgh Steelers. He was waived at the end of camp. Bohling briefly was a taxi squad player for the Chicago Cardinals, but drew his release without joining the active roster. Bohling spent the 1959 season out of football. However, with the emergence of the American Football League, Bohling found himself back in football, and under the guidance of a familiar face. Sammy Baugh left Hardin-Simmons to coach the New York Titans. Bohling rushed for 431 yards on 123 attempts and scored two touchdowns in his rookie season with the Titans. Bohling split his second and final season in pro football with the Titans and the Buffalo Bills. On October 17th, Bohling was placed on waivers by the Titans, and later claimed by the Bills. Bohling split time in Buffalo with fellow backs Art Baker and Wray Carlton. At the end of the season, the Bills cleaned house. Buster Ramsey, the head coach was fired, and Bohling was one of many players given their outright release. Bohling tried to stick with the Houston Oilers the following season, but was released at the end of camp.

== Personal life and death ==
After his playing career was over, Bohling ventured to New Mexico, where he'd establish himself as a high school coach. Coaching at ten different schools in 43 years, Bohling retired with a record of 150 wins. He married his wife, Sandra, and had one son. In 2012, Bohling was inducted into the New Mexico Sports Hall Of Fame. Bohling died in Albuquerque on October 19, 2025, at the age of 87.

== See also ==
- List of American Football League players
