= Glenn Bass =

American football player (born 1939)

No. 88, 85, 27
- Position: Wide receiver

Personal information
- Born: April 12, 1939 (age 87); Wilson, North Carolina, U.S.
- Listed height: 6 ft 2 in (1.88 m)
- Listed weight: 202 lb (92 kg)

Career information
- High school: Wilson (NC)
- College: East Carolina
- NFL draft: 1961: 5th round, 64th overall pick
- AFL draft: 1961: 23rd round, 183rd overall pick

Career history
- Buffalo Bills (1961-1966); Oakland Raiders (1967)*; Houston Oilers (1967-1968)
- * Offseason or practice squad member only

Awards and highlights
- 2× AFL Champion (1964, 1965)

Career AFL statistics
- Receptions: 167
- Receiving yards: 2,841
- Receiving touchdowns: 17
- Stats at Pro Football Reference

Glenn Alden Bass (born April 12, 1939) is a former collegiate and professional American football player. He played college football at East Carolina University. A flanker, he played professionally in the American Football League for the Buffalo Bills from 1961 through 1966, and for the Houston Oilers in 1966 and 1967. Bass caught fifty passes for the Bills as a rookie. He played in five playoffs with the Bills and Oilers, winning three Eastern Division titles (1964–1966) and two American Football League Championships (1964 and 1965) with the Bills, and an Eastern Division crown with the Oilers (1967).

After football, he served as an administrative assistant to North Carolina Governor Dan K. Moore and was also a pastor. He eventually moved to Tallahassee, Florida, becoming a sports director at Florida State University.

He has been inducted into the East Carolina University Hall of Fame and the North Carolina Sports Hall of Fame.

== AFL career statistics ==
Legend
	Won the AFL championship
	Led the league
**Bold**	Career high

=== Regular season ===
Year	Team	Games		Receiving				
Year	Team	GP	GS	Rec	Yds	Avg	Lng	TD
1961	BUF	14	12	**50**	765	15.3	76	3
1962	BUF	14	14	32	555	17.3	76	4
1963	BUF	9	0	9	153	17.0	74	1
1964	BUF	14	13	43	**897**	**20.9**	**94**	**7**
1965	BUF	4	4	18	299	16.6	38	1
1966	BUF	14	3	10	130	13.0	19	0
1967	HOU	7	0	5	42	8.4	15	1
1968	HOU	3	0	0	0	0.0	0	0
Career		79	46	167	2,841	17.0	94	17

=== Playoffs ===
Year	Team	Games		Receiving				
Year	Team	GP	GS	Rec	Yds	Avg	Lng	TD
1963	BUF	1	1	**4**	45	11.3	27	0
1964	BUF	1	1	2	**70**	**35.0**	**51**	0
1966	BUF	1	0	2	26	13.0	19	0
Career		3	2	8	141	17.6	51	0

== See also ==
- List of American Football League players
