= Bernie Buzyniski =

American football player (1938–2008)

Bernard Buzyniski
No. 55
- Positions: Linebacker, end

Personal information
- Born: May 3, 1938; Lockport, New York
- Died: September 11, 2008 (aged 70); Winter Haven, Florida
- Listed height: 6 ft 3 in (1.91 m)
- Listed weight: 228 lb (103 kg)

Career information
- High school: Geneva (NY) DeSales
- College: Holy Cross

Career history
- Buffalo Bills (1960)
- Stats at Pro Football Reference

Bernard Joseph Buzyniski (May 3, 1938 – September 11, 2008) was an American football linebacker and end. He played one season of professional football in the American Football League (AFL) for the Buffalo Bills in 1960. He played college football for Holy Cross from 1956 to 1959.

== Early life ==
Buzyniski was born in 1938 in Lockport, New York. He attended DeSales High School in Lockport. He was a defensive halfback on the DeSales football team.

Buzyniski played college football for the Holy Cross Crusaders from 1956 to 1959. He was a two-way end at Holy Cross.

== Professional football ==
In September 1960, Buzyniski signed with the Buffalo Bills of the American Football League (AFL). He played at the linebacker position for the Bills during the 1960 season, appearing in 14 games, 11 as a starter. He was signed to a new contract with the Bills in May 1961. His playing career was cut short by a knee injury sustained in an August 1961 exhibition game with the Hamilton Tiger-Cats. He was cut by the Bills in September 1961.

== Family and later years ==
Buzyniski was married to Cecilia Elizabeth Castle in June 1961. He died in 2008 at age 70 in Winter Haven, Florida.
