= Robert Sedlock =

American football player (1937–1991)

No. 75
- Position: Tackle

Personal information
- Born: February 7, 1937; Canton, Ohio, U.S.
- Died: May 12, 1991 (aged 54); Detroit, Michigan, U.S.
- Listed height: 6 ft 4 in (1.93 m)
- Listed weight: 295 lb (134 kg)

Career information
- High school: McKinley
- College: Georgia

Career history
- Buffalo Bills (1960)
- Stats at Pro Football Reference

Robert John Sedlock (February 7, 1937 – May 12, 1991) was an American football player who played with the Buffalo Bills. He played college football at the University of Georgia. Sedlock died in Detroit, Michigan on May 12, 1991, at the age of 54.
