= Wray Carlton =

American gridiron football player (born 1937)

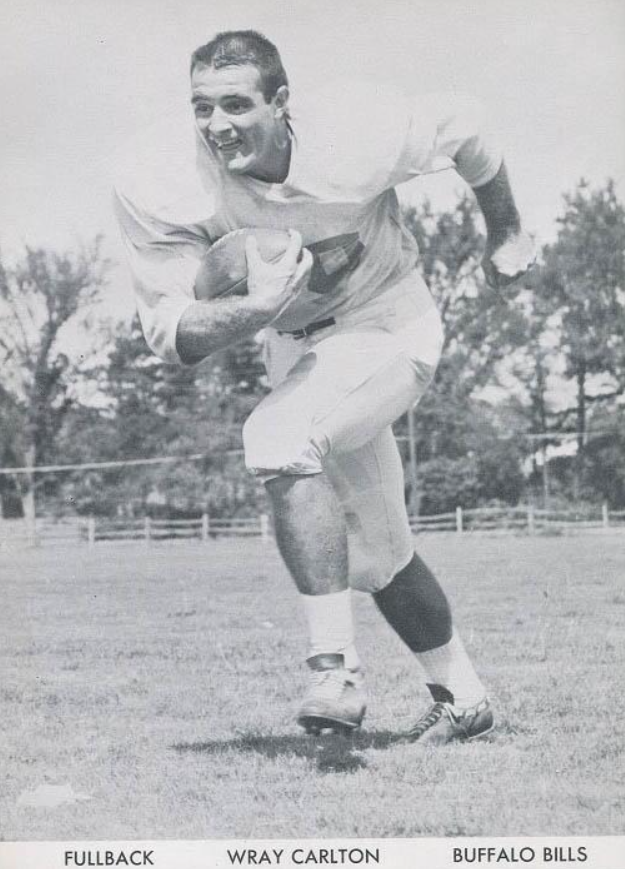
- Carlton in 1960

No. 98, 30
- Positions: Halfback, fullback

Personal information
- Born: June 18, 1937 (age 89); Wallace, North Carolina, U.S.
- Listed height: 6 ft 2 in (1.88 m)
- Listed weight: 225 lb (102 kg)

Career information
- High school: Wallace-Rose Hill (NC)
- College: Duke (1955–1958)
- NFL draft: 1959: 3rd round, 26th overall pick

Career history
- Toronto Argonauts (1959); Buffalo Bills (1960–1967)

Awards and highlights
- 2× AFL champion (1964, 1965); 2× AFL All-Star (1965, 1966); First Buffalo Bill to score a touchdown; Second-team All-American (1957); 2× First-team All-ACC (1957, 1958)

Career AFL statistics
- Rushing yards: 3,368
- Rushing average: 4.1
- Receptions: 110
- Receiving yards: 1,329
- Total touchdowns: 34
- Stats at Pro Football Reference

Linwood Wray Carlton (born June 18, 1937) is an American former professional football player who was a running back in both Canada and the United States. He played college football for the Duke Blue Devils.

Unable to come to terms with the Philadelphia Eagles, who had selected him in the 1959 NFL draft, Carlton traveled to Toronto and the Canadian Football League (CFL) to play for the Argonauts. His Canadian career lasted only four games before he declined a trade to Vancouver, British Columbia, and went home. But another league and another opportunity was in his future.

In his early years with the Buffalo Bills of the American Football League (AFL), Carlton formed a virtually unstoppable backfield tandem, first with Elbert "Golden Wheels" Dubenion, then with Carlton Chester "Cookie" Gilchrist.

On September 18, 1960, in Buffalo's home opener, a 27–21 loss to the Denver Broncos, Carlton made history in the second quarter when he scored the team's first touchdown on a one-yard run. Carlton gained 1,010 yards from scrimmage (533 rushing and 477 receiving) and 11 touchdowns in the Bills first season.

Carlton briefly retired following the 1963 season, but re-signed with the Bills in July 1964.

Later he helped the Bills win back-to-back league championships in 1964 and 1965. Perennially among the AFL's top rushers, he led the league in rushing touchdowns in 1965 and was voted to the American Football League Eastern Division All-Star team in 1965 and 1966. Carlton was the Bills' all-time leading rusher during their AFL years, with a 4.1 yards per carry average. He was cut from the team in the 1968 preseason; he, along with Dubenion (who finished the 1968 season then retired), were the last players from the Bills' inaugural season still on the roster.

== AFL career statistics ==
Legend
	Won the AFL championship
	Led the league
**Bold**	Career high

=== Regular season ===
Year	Team	Games		Rushing					Receiving				
Year	Team	GP	GS	Att	Yds	Avg	Lng	TD	Rec	Yds	Avg	Lng	TD
1960	BUF	14	14	137	533	3.9	54	**7**	**29**	**477**	**16.4**	**70**	**4**
1961	BUF	14	8	101	311	3.1	27	4	17	193	11.4	22	0
1962	BUF	11	11	94	530	**5.6**	51	2	7	54	7.7	25	0
1963	BUF	4	3	29	125	4.3	19	0	1	9	9.0	9	0
1964	BUF	4	3	39	114	2.9	11	1	2	23	11.5	17	0
1965	BUF	14	14	**156**	592	3.8	**80**	6	24	196	8.2	23	1
1966	BUF	14	13	156	**696**	4.5	23	6	21	280	13.3	55	0
1967	BUF	12	11	107	467	4.4	21	3	9	97	10.8	24	0
		87	77	819	3,368	4.1	80	29	110	1,329	12.1	70	5

=== Playoffs ===
Year	Team	Games		Rushing					Receiving				
Year	Team	GP	GS	Att	Yds	Avg	Lng	TD	Rec	Yds	Avg	Lng	TD
1964	BUF	1	1	**18**	**70**	**3.9**	**13**	**1**	0	0	0.0	0	0
1965	BUF	1	1	16	63	**3.9**	8	0	0	0	0.0	0	0
1966	BUF	1	1	9	31	3.4	10	0	**1**	**5**	**5.0**	**5**	0
		3	3	43	164	3.8	13	1	1	5	5.0	5	0

== Awards ==
- Carlton was inducted into The Greater Wilmington Sports Hall of Fame in 2008
- The North Carolina Sports Hall of Fame in 2012.

== See also ==
- List of American Football League players
