= Harry Wismer =

American sports broadcaster

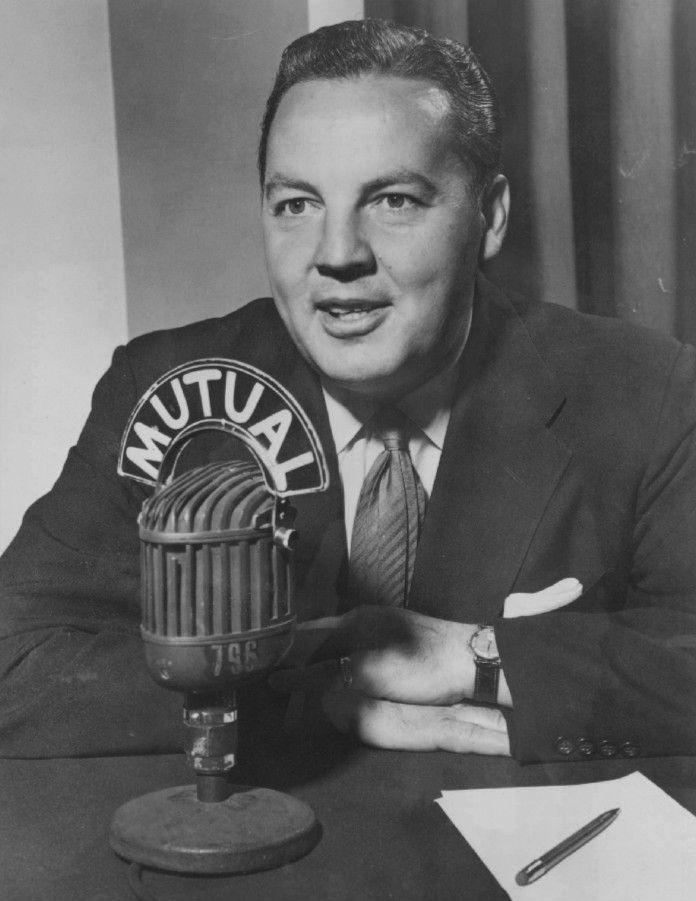
- Hosting the Sports-Ten show on the Mutual Broadcasting System
- Born: June 30, 1913; Port Huron, Michigan, U.S.
- Died: December 4, 1967 (aged 54); New York City, U.S.
- Education: University of Florida; Michigan State College
- Known for: Sports broadcaster, Charter AFL owner: New York Titans (1960–1962)
- Spouses: Mary Elizabeth Bryant; Mary Zwillman (m. 1962)
- Children: 2

Harry Wismer (June 30, 1913 – December 4, 1967) was an American sports broadcaster and the founder of the Titans of New York (Now the New York Jets) franchise in the American Football League (AFL).

== Early years ==
Harry Wismer was born on June 30, 1913, in Port Huron, Michigan, to Fred R. Wismer and his wife. Wismer displayed great interest and prowess in sports at an early age. He was a multiple sport star at Port Huron High School, but bad grades temporarily derailed his college plans and he entered a private school, earning letters in football, basketball, and baseball at St. John's Military Academy in Delafield, Wisconsin.

Wismer played college football at both the University of Florida and Michigan State College, his playing career ending at the latter school when he damaged a knee severely during a game against the University of Michigan. He then began broadcasting Michigan State sports on MSC's radio station WKAR in a position arranged for him by Spartans head coach Charlie Bachman. In 1934, he was hired as the public-address announcer for the Detroit Lions. The Lions were in their first season in Detroit and were owned by George A. Richards, who also owned Detroit radio station WJR. Wismer soon began doing a ten-minute daily radio show covering the Lions in addition to his PA duties, while continuing as a student at Michigan State.

== Broadcaster ==
After the 1936 season, Wismer was encouraged by Richards to abandon his studies and come to work for WJR on a full-time basis as the station's sports director. Among Wismer's WJR duties was serving as play-by-play announcer for the station's Lions broadcasts. In August 1940, he resigned to join the Maxon, Inc., advertising agency as an account executive, with the provision that he would continue to broadcast Lions' games. In 1941, he was hired by the NBC Blue Network, the predecessor to ABC. During the 1940s Wismer was named Sportscaster of the Year three years running by Sporting News magazine. In 1947, he was named one of 10 outstanding young Americans of the year by the U.S. Jaycees, along with congressman John F. Kennedy, historian Arthur Schlesinger, Jr., and physicist Philip Morrison. However, a subsequent management change at ABC led to a new regime that was hostile to sports, and Wismer became a free-lancer, selling his service to the highest bidder. Wismer became known for an enormous ego and developed a reputation as a "namedropper", preferring to announce the names of celebrities of his acquaintance who were in the audience to the actual game action, and was alleged at times to include them in the crowd of games which he announced when they were in fact elsewhere.

In the late 1940s, he provided the voice talent to numerous 16 mm college football films. Wismer often added the sound commentary long after the games were over, and added a radio-style commentary with sound effects such as referee whistles to recreate an authentic sound. He was owner of HarFilms, a short-lived New Orleans–based sports film production company. He appeared in the 1948 Hollywood production Triple Threat as a football broadcaster.

Wismer achieved the height of his fame as the voice of the Washington Redskins. His first game for the Redskins was a most inauspicious one in December 1940, their 73–0 loss to the Chicago Bears' great "Monsters of the Midway" team in the 1940 championship game. At one point Wismer was a 25% owner of the club as well, with the majority of the stock being retained by the founding owner George Preston Marshall. However, the relationship between the two had greatly degenerated by the mid-1950s over several issues, not the least of which was Marshall's steadfast refusal to sign any black players. The relationship dissolved in claims, counterclaims, and litigation, and Marshall then set out to destroy Wismer's future as a broadcaster, with some success. Wismer was also involved for a time in the broadcasting of Notre Dame football.

In 1953, Wismer was involved in an early attempt to expand football into prime time network television, when ABC, now with a renewed interest in sports, broadcast an edited replay on Sunday nights of the previous day's Notre Dame games, which were cut down to 75 minutes in length by removing the time between plays, halftime, and even some of the more uneventful plays. (While this format was not successful in prime time, a similar presentation of Notre Dame football later became a staple of Sunday mornings for many years on CBS with Lindsey Nelson as the announcer.)

Also, that season was the first attempt at prime-time coverage of pro football, with Wismer at the microphone on the old DuMont Network. Unlike ABC's Notre Dame coverage, DuMont's NFL game was presented live on Saturday nights, but interest was not adequate to save the DuMont Network, which had by this point already entered what would be a terminal decline (although it did mount a subsequent 1954 season of NFL telecasts, minus Wismer, which proved to be one of its last regular programs).

== AFL owner ==
Wismer was a charter owner in the AFL, which was announced in 1959 and began play in 1960. He was one of two owners with experience in sports team ownership and in broadcasting. He had previously been a part owner of the Detroit Lions (alongside Buffalo's Ralph Wilson) and on the board of directors of the Washington Redskins.

Wismer devised a plan in which the proceeds from the broadcast rights to league games (initially with ABC) would be shared equally by all teams and set the standard for all future professional football television broadcasting contracts.

Wismer owned a franchise in the nation's largest media market. However, he had realized that the fledgling league needed for all of the eight franchises to be successful in order to survive long-term.

Unfortunately for Wismer, his own team, despite being located in the nation's largest city, was probably the most problematic in the league in its initial years. For one thing, the team was relegated to playing its home games in the rundown Polo Grounds, which had been abandoned after the New York Giants baseball team relocated to San Francisco at the end of 1957.

However, Wismer's biggest challenge was that, unlike the majority of AFL franchises, his team was in direct competition with an established NFL team. Since 1956, the NFL football Giants had been playing across the Harlem River in prestigious Yankee Stadium in The Bronx, and the New York media for the most part was derisive and dismissive of the Titans, when it deigned to mention them at all. For most New York sports reporters of the era, professional football in New York City began and ended with the Giants.

Further, Wismer's volatile personality was of little help in terms of earning any sort of goodwill from either his then-current or former colleagues: he resented not only other media figures, but also Dallas Texans owner Lamar Hunt, whom Wismer referred to as a rich boy whose father had bought him a football team as a toy. Wismer also had an ongoing feud with AFL commissioner Joe Foss, and had at times a far-less-than-warm relationship with the Titans' first head coach, Hall of Fame quarterback Sammy Baugh, who had been the losing quarterback in the 73-0 blowout in 1940 (which also marked Wismer's debut with the Redskins as noted above).

The other serious flaw in the Titans' business plan was that Wismer lacked the funding that some of the other early AFL owners, particularly Hunt and Oilers owner Bud Adams, possessed. For the most part, their wealth had come from sources outside the field of sports.

Although professional sports were already quite popular in the U.S., even the "established" major leagues were still far from the lucrative industry they were shortly to become, and teams in this era still generated most of their income from ticket sales. While Wismer's broadcasting rights plan would ultimately revolutionize professional sports, particularly football, the television contracts negotiated during Wismer's AFL tenure were nevertheless worth a pittance compared to subsequent contracts, and as such, broadcasting revenues were still little more than a relatively minor sideline compared to gate receipts.

During this era, even NFL teams (especially those whose owners lacked substantial business interests outside football) survived only by carefully managing their finances. In contrast, AFL founder Hunt, who was well aware of the challenges he faced, intended to use his own wealth to underwrite the inevitable early losses and expected his fellow AFL owners to do likewise, which was not a viable plan for Wismer since his wealth, such as it was, had come entirely from his sports involvement.

The blue-and-gold Titans drew 114,682 paying fans to the Polo Grounds in the initial season in 1960, which ranked last in the AFL: this fell to 107,119 in 1961, and then collapsed to a mere 36,161 total for seven home games under new head coach Clyde "Bulldog" Turner - after the season, Wismer was broke. Only loans from other AFL owners, including Wilson and Houston Oilers owner Bud Adams, kept Wismer and the Titans (as well as several other teams including the Oakland Raiders and Boston Patriots) afloat.

This was a necessity for the league to remain viable, as U.S. broadcasters have traditionally had a very limited level of interest in team sports leagues without a viable New York franchise, due to the size of that market area. Wismer, who had long tended to live "hard-and-fast", began to drink even more heavily, and eventually ruined his relationships with all of the other AFL owners, even Adams.

They arranged the March 1963 sale of the team to a more financially stable group of investors headed by Sonny Werblin, who rebranded the team as the Jets in April and hired Weeb Ewbank as head coach. In an ironic twist, the Titans name would eventually be revived three decades after Wismer's death by the aforementioned Adams when he rebranded the Oilers as the Tennessee Titans after moving his team to Nashville.

The now green-and-white Jets were still at the Polo Grounds in 1963, with four of their home games on Saturday nights, before they moved into the new Shea Stadium in 1964, where they played for two decades. When Werblin signed University of Alabama star quarterback Joe Namath in January 1965 for a package worth a then-unheard of value of roughly $430,000, the Jets, and the AFL, were made. The Namath signing, his subsequent stardom, and a new, more lucrative television contract with NBC, led more than any other single factor to the AFL–NFL merger.

When Werblin sold his share of the team in May 1968, the franchise value had gone from $1 million to $15 million in those five years. On the other hand, Wismer was left embittered, with debts totalling approximately $2.5 million, and eventually struggled to settle for 78 cents on the dollar.

== Final years ==
Wismer wrote a book, The Public Calls It Sport, which was something of a combination autobiography and explanation of his philosophy of life. Sales were not particularly brisk. He got involved in the Michigan Speedway project, which, to his great chagrin, was very slow to get under way. Wismer's health, far from brisk, broke completely from depression and alcoholism on top of his other problems after a trip overseas. In 1967, he sought treatment at the Mayo Clinic for cancer before returning to his hometown of Port Huron, where he underwent more treatments, including the replacement of his cancerous hip.

Largely given up on, Wismer rallied, and soon fulfilled his desire to return to New York City. Once there, he found that he was no longer a celebrity or even much noticed, and of those who did notice, more held him in contempt than liked him. His drinking problem returned with a vengeance, and on December 3 he suffered a fall at a restaurant while drunk, falling down a flight of stairs. Still weakened from his earlier health problems, he died early the next morning on December 4. An autopsy gave a skull fracture as being the immediate cause of death. Wismer's brother John, a Port Huron radio station owner, claimed ever afterward Harry had been thrown down the stairs by mobsters, though for what reason wasn't clear. Today Wismer is remembered primarily as something of an eccentric rather than as a crucial founder of the AFL and one of the creators of professional football's modern era through shared broadcast revenues.

== Personal life ==
Wismer was married twice. His first wife, Mary Elizabeth Bryant, was related to the Henry Ford family. They divorced in 1959. His second marriage in 1962 was to Mary Zwillman, the widow of New Jersey mobster Abner Zwillman. Mary Zwillman Wismer was appointed as the Titans' nominal chief executive officer. He had two children: Wendy and Henry.

In the documentary series Full Color Football: The Story of the American Football League, former New York Titans players speculated that Wismer's marriage to Mary Zwillman was partially based on Wismer believing that Mary had a substantial inheritance from Abner that Wismer was then going to use to finance the team.

== Quote ==
"...no matter how good you think you are, how shrewd you are, there is always someone down the block, across the street, in the next town, who is a little better, shrewder, more ruthless."

From The Public Calls It Sport

== In popular culture ==
In a song on Commentary! The Musical, a bonus feature on the DVD of Dr. Horrible's Sing-Along Blog, Simon Helberg mentions his character Moist's fear of stairs, commenting "That's how Harry Wismer died."

While pulling the New York Titans and the AFL together, Wismer was approached by writer George Plimpton, who asked to join the team's training camp for a Sports Illustrated profile. Wismer agreed, later forgot about it, and Plimpton ended up playing with and writing about Wismer's old team, the Detroit Lions, for the magazine and in the book Paper Lion. Plimpton on Wismer: "He was an odd man. He used to say 'Congratulations' to many people he met, on the grounds that they had probably done something they could be proud of."

== See also ==
- List of American Football League players

Sporting positions
New creation	New York Jets principal owner 1959–1963	Succeeded by Sonny Werblin
