= Thurlow Cooper =

American football player (1933–2008)

No. 88
- Positions: Tight end, defensive end

Personal information
- Born: March 18, 1933; Augusta, Maine, U.S.
- Died: February 14, 2008 (aged 74); Portland, Maine, U.S.
- Listed height: 6 ft 5 in (1.96 m)
- Listed weight: 228 lb (103 kg)

Career information
- High school: Cony (Augusta); Maine Central Institute (Pittsfield, Maine)
- College: Maine
- NFL draft: 1956: 16th round, 193rd overall pick

Career history
- New York Titans (1960–1962)

Awards and highlights
- Third-team All-Eastern (1956)

Career NFL statistics
- Receptions: 36
- Receiving yards: 491
- Touchdowns: 8
- Stats at Pro Football Reference

Sheldon Thurlow Cooper (March 18, 1933 – February 14, 2008) was a college and professional American football player. A tight end, he played college football at the University of Maine, and played professionally in the American Football League (AFL) as an original New York Titan in the 1960 through 1962 AFL seasons. He was selected in the 16th round of the 1956 NFL draft by the National Football League (NFL)'s Cleveland Browns, but never played in the NFL.

== See also ==
- List of American Football League players
