= Sid Youngelman =

American football player (1931–1991)

- Youngelman in 1955

No. 77, 73, 75, 76
- Positions: Defensive tackle, defensive end

Personal information
- Born: December 1, 1931; Newark, New Jersey, U.S.
- Died: December 15, 1991 (aged 60); Lake Hiawatha, New Jersey, U.S.
- Listed height: 6 ft 3 in (1.91 m)
- Listed weight: 257 lb (117 kg)

Career information
- High school: Abraham Lincoln (Brooklyn, New York)
- College: Alabama
- NFL draft: 1954: 7th round, 83rd overall pick

Career history
- San Francisco 49ers (1955); Philadelphia Eagles (1956–1958); Cleveland Browns (1959); New York Titans (1960-1961); Buffalo Bills (1962-1963)

Career NFL/AFL statistics
- Fumble recoveries: 3
- Sacks: 13
- Stats at Pro Football Reference

Sidney Youngelman (December 1, 1931 – December 15, 1991) was an American football lineman in the National Football League (NFL) for the San Francisco 49ers, Philadelphia Eagles, and the Cleveland Browns. He also played in the American Football League (AFL) for the New York Titans and Buffalo Bills.

Youngelman played college football at the University of Alabama.

== Biography ==
=== Early life ===
Sid Youngelman was born December 1, 1931, in Newark, New Jersey. He attended Abraham Lincoln High School in Brooklyn, New York, where he played basketball and football for the Honest Abes.

On the gridiron, Youngelman played end for Lincoln High. He was elected a co-captain of both the football and basketball team in 1949, becoming just the third athlete in the history of the school to be named a captain of two major-sport teams.

Following the conclusion of his senior season, Youngelman was honored with the Morris Kaufman Memorial Trophy, presented to the Lincoln player for character, leadership, sportsmanship, and ability. He also received the team's Outstanding Lineman Cup for 1949 and a silver football and three year letter for his part of the school's football team. He also was the co-winner of the 1949-50 scoring championship for the Brooklyn Public School Athletic League, with 207 points scored in 14 games, for an average of 14.8 points per tilt.

The 6'3" Youngelmen was accorded All-City and All-Brooklyn honors in both football and basketball at the end of his high school career.

=== College career ===
Youngelman attended the University of Alabama in Tuscaloosa, where he played on the football team. He was moved from end to tackle at the college level, playing on both the offensive and defensive side of the ball.

Moving to the varsity in 1951, Youngelman made his mark as a stout defender on the line during fall practice, shutting down his offensive teammates again and again. With the sophomore Youngelman gaining a starting role, Alabama finished with a record of 5–6 in 1951 — buried in 8th place in the 12 team Southeastern Conference (SEC).

== See also ==
- List of select Jewish football players
