= Ray Abruzzese =

American football player (1937–2011)

No. 46, 25
- Position: Safety

Personal information
- Born: October 27, 1937; Philadelphia, Pennsylvania, U.S.
- Died: August 22, 2011 (aged 73); Fort Lauderdale, Florida, U.S.
- Listed height: 6 ft 1 in (1.85 m)
- Listed weight: 194 lb (88 kg)

Career information
- High school: South Philadelphia
- College: Alabama
- NFL draft: 1962: 16th round, 219th overall pick
- AFL draft: 1962: 23rd round, 180th overall pick

Career history
- Buffalo Bills (1962-1964); New York Jets (1965-1966)

Awards and highlights
- AFL champion (1964); National champion (1961)

Career AFL statistics
- Interceptions: 9
- Kick/punt return yards: 497
- Stats at Pro Football Reference

Raymond Lewis Abruzzese Jr. (Pronounced: "AH-broot-sez") (October 27, 1937 – August 22, 2011) was an American college and professional football player.

Abruzzese was born in Philadelphia, Pennsylvania. He played football during his high school years, when he gained the nickname "The Hawk" from teammates due to his skill as a defensive back spotting and intercepting passes in flight.

He played college football at the University of Alabama, and played professionally in the American Football League (AFL) for the Buffalo Bills from 1962 through 1964, when the Bills won the AFL Championship game, 20–7, over the defending AFL champion San Diego Chargers. He played for the AFL's New York Jets in 1965 and 1966.

Abruzzese died in Fort Lauderdale, Florida, aged 73. He was one of at least 345 NFL players to be diagnosed after death with chronic traumatic encephalopathy (CTE), caused by repeated hits to the head.

== See also ==
- List of American Football League players
