= Joe Schaffer =

American football player (1937–2017)

No. 67
- Position: Linebacker

Personal information
- Born: October 14, 1937; Cincinnati, Ohio, U.S.
- Died: September 25, 2017 (aged 79); Cincinnati, Ohio, U.S.
- Listed height: 6 ft 0 in (1.83 m)
- Listed weight: 210 lb (95 kg)

Career information
- High school: Elder (Cincinnati, Ohio)
- College: Tennessee
- AFL draft: 1960

Career history
- Buffalo Bills (1960)

Awards and highlights
- First-team All-SEC (1959)
- Stats at Pro Football Reference

Joseph Leonard Schaffer (October 14, 1937 – September 25, 2017) was an American football player who played with the Buffalo Bills. He played college football at the University of Tennessee.
