= Bill Shockley =

American football player (1937–1992)

No. 29, 23, 14
- Positions: Kicker, Halfback

Personal information
- Born: March 13, 1937; West Chester, Pennsylvania, U.S.
- Died: December 7, 1992 (aged 55); New York City, New York, U.S.
- Listed height: 6 ft 0 in (1.83 m)
- Listed weight: 185 lb (84 kg)

Career information
- High school: Conestoga (Berwyn, Pennsylvania)
- College: West Chester
- NFL draft: 1960: undrafted

Career history
- New York Titans (1960); Buffalo Bills (1961); New York Titans (1961–1962); Pittsburgh Steelers (1968)

Awards and highlights
- Third-team Little All-American (1959)

Career NFL statistics
- Field goals made: 26
- Field goals attempted: 57
- Rushing yards: 165
- Receptions: 11
- Receiving yards: 96
- Receiving touchdowns: 2
- Stats at Pro Football Reference

William Albert Shockley Jr. (March 13, 1937 – December 7, 1992) was an American professional football kicker and halfback who played for four seasons for four different teams, the New York Titans, Buffalo Bills, and the Pittsburgh Steelers. He played college football at West Chester University.
