= Archie Matsos =

American football player (1934–2021)

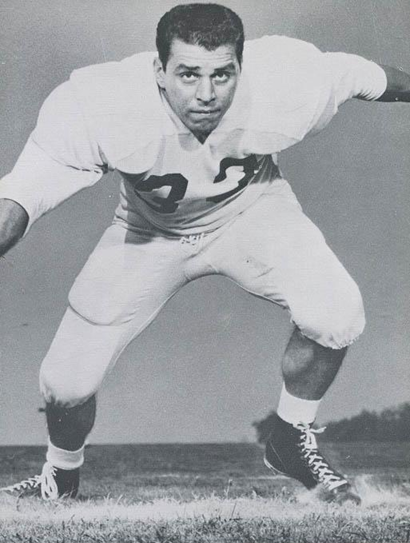

No. 56, 55, 67
- Position: Linebacker

Personal information
- Born: November 22, 1934; Detroit, Michigan, U.S.
- Died: May 28, 2021 (aged 86); Lansing, Michigan, U.S.
- Listed height: 6 ft 0 in (1.83 m)
- Listed weight: 217 lb (98 kg)

Career information
- High school: Redford High School (Detroit)
- College: Michigan State
- NFL draft: 1958: 16th round, 189th overall pick

Career history
- Buffalo Bills (1960–1962); Oakland Raiders (1963–1965); Denver Broncos (1966); San Diego Chargers (1966)

Awards and highlights
- 3× All-AFL (1961–1963)

Career AFL statistics
- Interceptions: 22
- Touchdowns: 1
- Sacks: 4
- Stats at Pro Football Reference

Archie Matsos (November 22, 1934 – May 28, 2021) was an American professional football linebacker. He played for the Buffalo Bills from 1960 to 1962, the Oakland Raiders from 1963 to 1965 and the Denver Broncos and San Diego Chargers in 1966.

== Early life and college ==
Matsos was a multisport standout at Detroit's Redford High School; he played college football at Michigan State University.

== Professional career ==
Matsos played for seven seasons in the American Football League for four teams. He was on the Sporting News All-AFL team in 1960 and 1963, and an AFL Eastern Division All-Star in 1961 and 1962.

He died on May 28, 2021, in Lansing, Michigan at age 86.

== See also ==
- List of American Football League players
