= Art Baker (gridiron football) =

American football player (born 1937)

No. 33, 25, 27
- Position: Fullback

Personal information
- Born: December 31, 1937 (age 88); Erie, Pennsylvania, U.S.
- Listed height: 6 ft 0 in (1.83 m)
- Listed weight: 220 lb (100 kg)

Career information
- College: Syracuse
- NFL draft: 1961: 1st round, 14th overall pick
- AFL draft: 1961: 3rd round, 18th overall pick

Career history
- Buffalo Bills (1961-1962); Hamilton Tiger-Cats (1963–1966); Calgary Stampeders (1966)

Awards and highlights
- 2× Grey Cup champion (1963, 1965); National champion (1959); First-team All-Eastern (1959)

Career AFL statistics
- Rushing yards: 507
- Rushing average: 3.3
- Receptions: 9
- Receiving yards: 85
- Total touchdowns: 4
- Stats at Pro Football Reference

Medal record

Collegiate Wrestling

Representing the Syracuse Orange

NCAA Championships
Gold medal – first place	1959 Iowa City	191 lb

Arthur R. Baker (born December 31, 1937) is an American former professional football player. He played college football at Syracuse University, where he was an All-American fullback in the backfield with Heisman Trophy winner Ernie Davis.

He was also an NCAA wrestling national champion at Syracuse in 1959, becoming the second African-American to win an NCAA wrestling title. In 1959, he was the only college athlete to win division one national titles in two different sports in the same year.

Baker played professionally in the American Football League (AFL) for the Buffalo Bills in 1961 and 1962. He then went to the Canadian Football League (CFL), where he played four seasons, mainly for the Hamilton Tiger-Cats.

== See also ==
- List of American Football League players
