= Don Chelf =

American football player (1933–2019)

No. 77
- Positions: Tackle, guard

Personal information
- Born: March 25, 1933; West Liberty, Iowa, U.S.
- Died: July 16, 2019 (aged 86); Tampa, Florida, U.S.
- Listed height: 6 ft 3 in (1.91 m)
- Listed weight: 235 lb (107 kg)

Career information
- High school: West Liberty
- College: Iowa
- NFL draft: 1954: 12th round, 136th overall pick

Career history
- Ottawa Rough Riders (1957)*; Buffalo Bills (1960–1961)
- * Offseason or practice squad member only

Career AFL statistics
- Games played: 28
- Games started: 14
- Stats at Pro Football Reference

Donald Richard Chelf (March 25, 1933 – July 16, 2019) was an American football player who played with the Buffalo Bills. He played college football at the University of Iowa.

Chelf died on July 16, 2019, in Tampa, Florida of lung cancer.
