= Tom Rychlec =

American football player (1934–2023)

No. 81, 80
- Position: Tight end

Personal information
- Born: September 11, 1934; Meriden, Connecticut, U.S.
- Died: October 17, 2023 (aged 89); Meriden, Connecticut, U.S.
- Listed height: 6 ft 3 in (1.91 m)
- Listed weight: 220 lb (100 kg)

Career information
- High school: Monson Academy (MA)
- College: American International
- NFL draft: 1957: 10th round, 119th overall pick

Career history
- Detroit Lions (1958); Buffalo Bills (1960-1962); Denver Broncos (1963); Hartford Charter Oaks (1964); Hartford Knights (1968-1969)

Career NFL/AFL statistics
- Receptions: 87
- Receiving yards: 1,089
- Touchdowns: 3
- Stats at Pro Football Reference

Thomas Richard Rychlec (Pronounced: RYE-lek) (September 11, 1934 – October 17, 2023) was an American professional football player who was a tight end for five seasons with the National Football League's Detroit Lions and the American Football League's Buffalo Bills and Denver Broncos. Rychlec died in Meriden, Connecticut, on October 17, 2023, at the age of 89.
