= Monte Crockett =

American football player (1938–2012)

No. 80
- Positions: Halfback, tight end

Personal information
- Born: July 14, 1938; Talcott, West Virginia
- Died: June 13, 2012 (aged 73); Columbus, Ohio
- Listed height: 6 ft 4 in (1.93 m)
- Listed weight: 218 lb (99 kg)

Career information
- High school: Hinton (WV) Lincoln
- College: New Mexico Highlands

Career history
- Buffalo Bills (1960–1962)
- Stats at Pro Football Reference

Monte Crockett (July 14, 1938 – June 13, 2012) was an American football halfback and tight end. He played for the Buffalo Bills from 1960 to 1962.

He died on June 13, 2012, in Columbus, Ohio at age 73.
