= Joe Hergert =

American football player (1936–2016)

No. 54
- Positions: Linebacker, placekicker

Personal information
- Born: June 7, 1936; Wilkes-Barre, Pennsylvania, U.S.
- Died: January 16, 2016 (aged 79); Daytona Beach, Florida, U.S.
- Listed height: 6 ft 1 in (1.85 m)
- Listed weight: 216 lb (98 kg)

Career information
- High school: Daytona Beach (FL) Mainland
- College: Florida
- NFL draft: 1959: 24th round, 277th overall pick

Career history
- Montreal Alouettes (1960)*; Buffalo Bills (1960–1961)
- * Offseason or practice squad member only

Career AFL statistics
- Interceptions: 2
- Touchdowns: 1
- Field goal attempts: 18
- Field goals: 8
- Stats at Pro Football Reference

Joseph Martin Hergert (June 7, 1936 – January 16, 2016) was an American college and professional football player who was a linebacker and placekicker in the American Football League (AFL) for two seasons during the early 1960s. Hergert played college football for the University of Florida, and thereafter, he played professionally for the Buffalo Bills of the AFL.

== Early life ==
Hergert was born in Wilkes-Barre, Pennsylvania. He attended Mainland High School in Daytona Beach, Florida, and played high school football for the Mainland Buccaneers.

== College career ==
Hergert attended the University of Florida in Gainesville, Florida, where he played for coach Bob Woodruff's Florida Gators football team from 1956 to 1958. During his three seasons as a Gator, he played multiple positions, including center, fullback, linebacker, and placekicker.

== Professional career ==
The Green Bay Packers of the National Football League (NFL) selected Hergert in the 24th round (277th pick overall) of the 1959 NFL draft, but he did not play during the 1959 season. He played for the AFL's Buffalo Bills in 1960 and 1961.

== See also ==
- List of Florida Gators in the NFL draft
