= Chuck Muelhaupt =

American football player (1935–2012)

No. 70
- Position: Guard

Personal information
- Born: December 11, 1935; Canton, Ohio, U.S.
- Died: March 31, 2012 (aged 76); Des Moines, Iowa, U.S.
- Listed height: 6 ft 3 in (1.91 m)
- Listed weight: 230 lb (104 kg)

Career information
- High school: Dowling Catholic (Des Moines)
- College: Iowa State (1953–1956)
- NFL draft: 1957: 26th round, 311th overall pick

Career history

Playing
- Buffalo Bills (1960-1961)

Coaching
- Des Moines Warriors (1965) Assistant coach

Career AFL statistics
- Games played: 28
- Games started: 17
- Stats at Pro Football Reference

Edward Charles Muelhaupt (December 11, 1935 – March 31, 2012) was an American professional football player who was an offensive lineman for three seasons for the Buffalo Bills.
