= Jim Sorey =

American football player and coach (1936–2008)

No. 79
- Position: Defensive tackle

Personal information
- Born: September 5, 1936; Marianna, Florida, U.S.
- Died: August 12, 2008 (aged 71); Houston, Texas, U.S.
- Listed height: 6 ft 4 in (1.93 m)
- Listed weight: 285 lb (129 kg)

Career information
- High school: Middleton (Tampa, Florida)
- College: Texas Southern
- NFL draft: 1960: 14th round, 165th overall pick
- AFL draft: 1960

Career history

Playing
- Buffalo Bills (1960–1962)

Coaching
- Texas Southern Tigers (1979–1980) Head coach

Career AFL statistics
- Sacks: 3
- Stats at Pro Football Reference

Head coaching record
- Career: 5–17 (.227)

James Arthur "Bull" Sorey (September 5, 1936 – August 12, 2008) was an American professional football defensive tackle who played three seasons with the Buffalo Bills of the American Football League (AFL). He was selected by the Bills in the 1960 AFL draft after playing college football at Texas Southern University.

== Early life and college ==
James Arthur Sorey was born on September 5, 1936, in Marianna, Florida. He attended Middleton High School in Tampa, Florida.

Sorey played college football for the Texas Southern Tigers of Texas Southern University.

== Professional career ==
Sorey was selected in the 14th round by the Chicago Bears with the 165th pick of the 1960 NFL draft. He was selected by the Buffalo Bills in the 1960 AFL draft and played in 42 games for the team from 1960 to 1962.

== Coaching career ==
Sorey was named head coach of the Texas Southern Tigers in December 1978 and served in that capacity from 1979 to 1980, recording a 5–17 record.

== Personal life ==
Sorey died on August 12, 2008, in Houston, Texas.

== Head coaching record ==
Year	Team	Overall	Conference	Standing	Bowl/playoffs
Texas Southern Tigers (Southwestern Athletic Conference) (1979–1980)
1979	Texas Southern	3–8	1–5	6th	
1980	Texas Southern	2–9	2–4	6th	
Texas Southern:		5–17	3–9		
Total:		5–17			
