= Mack Yoho =

American gridiron football player (1936–2020)

No. 71, 82
- Position: Defensive end / Placekicker

Personal information
- Born: June 14, 1936; Reader, West Virginia, U.S.
- Died: September 14, 2020 (aged 84); Thousand Oaks, California, U.S.
- Listed height: 6 ft 2 in (1.88 m)
- Listed weight: 230 lb (104 kg)

Career information
- High school: East Canton (OH)
- College: Miami (OH)

Career history

Playing
- Ottawa Rough Riders (1958–1959); Buffalo Bills (1960–1965)

Coaching
- Yale Bulldogs (1966–1967)
- Stats at Pro Football Reference

Mack J. Yoho (June 14, 1936 – September 14, 2020) was an American and Canadian football player who played for the Ottawa Rough Riders and Buffalo Bills.
