= Chuck McMurtry =

American football player (1937–1984)

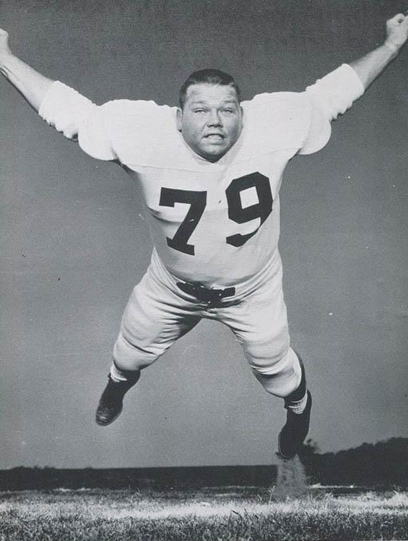

No. 74
- Position: Defensive tackle

Personal information
- Born: February 15, 1937; Chandler, Oklahoma, U.S.
- Died: February 13, 1984 (aged 46); Los Angeles, California, U.S.
- Listed height: 6 ft 0 in (1.83 m)
- Listed weight: 280 lb (127 kg)

Career information
- High school: Whittier (CA)
- College: Whittier
- AFL draft: 1960

Career history
- Buffalo Bills (1960–1961); Oakland Raiders (1962–1963)

Awards and highlights
- TSN All-AFL (1961); AFL All-Star (1961)
- Stats at Pro Football Reference

Charles Wayne McMurtry (February 15, 1937 – February 13, 1984) was an American football player. A defensive tackle, he played professionally in the American Football League for the Buffalo Bills and Oakland Raiders. McMurtry played college football at Whittier College. He died on February 13, 1984.
