= Pat McGroder =

American football executive

Patrick J. McGroder Jr. (March 17, 1904–January 15, 1986) was an American football executive. He served as the interim general manager of the Buffalo Bills in 1983.

McGroder was instrumental in bringing the Bills to Buffalo. After the previous Bills franchise in the All-America Football Conference (AAFC) was denied membership in the NFL, McGroder continued to lobby the NFL to bring a team to the city. Such was his renown that it was McGroder, and not Ralph Wilson, who was Lamar Hunt's first choice to own the Buffalo American Football League (AFL) franchise (Wilson was instead to own a team in Miami). McGroder had the resources to buy the team (at the time he owned a successful liquor store) but declined, thinking that the threat of the AFL would be enough for the league to expand to Buffalo. At the time, Buffalo had been a regular site for NFL neutral-site contests for two decades, and McGroder reasoned that the league's relative success in the city would make it a prime candidate for quick expansion in the face of the AFL's threat.

When the NFL again passed Buffalo up, and Wilson was unable to put his AFL team in Miami, Wilson and McGroder met, eventually agreeing to establish the modern Buffalo Bills. McGroder negotiated the lease with War Memorial Stadium and was rewarded with a position on the team's payroll in 1961. McGroder is included on the Bills' Wall of Fame in Highmark Stadium (then called Rich Stadium). When McGroder was placed on the Bills' Wall of Fame in 1985 (a time in which the Bills were performing very poorly on the field and found themselves unable to compete on the free-agent market for talent, especially with the USFL), fan discontent was so high that they openly booed Wilson when he introduced McGroder. McGroder, during his acceptance speech, defended Wilson, prompting further boos from the sparse crowd.

McGroder died January 15, 1986, shortly after his retirement.

== See also ==
- American Football Conference
