= Tom Day (American football) =

American football player (1935–2000)

No. 61, 78, 60, 64, 88, 89
- Positions: Guard, offensive tackle, defensive end, defensive tackle

Personal information
- Born: August 20, 1935; Washington, D.C., U.S.
- Died: August 21, 2000 (aged 65); Amherst, New York, U.S.
- Listed height: 6 ft 2 in (1.88 m)
- Listed weight: 252 lb (114 kg)

Career information
- High school: Phelps Career (DC)
- College: North Carolina A&T
- NFL draft: 1960: 20th round, 229th overall pick
- AFL draft: 1960

Career history
- St. Louis Cardinals (1960); Buffalo Bills (1961–1966); San Diego Chargers (1967); Atlanta Falcons (1968)*; Buffalo Bills (1968)
- * Offseason or practice squad member only

Awards and highlights
- 2× AFL champion (1964, 1965); AFL All-Star (1965)

Career NFL/AFL statistics
- Fumble recoveries: 1
- Interceptions: 1
- Sacks: 19.5
- Stats at Pro Football Reference

Thomas Frederick "Tippy" Day (August 20, 1935 – August 21, 2000) was an American football player.

Day was born in Washington, D.C.. He played college football at North Carolina A&T State University, where he was an all-conference player as a two-way lineman; he was also on the track team.

In 1960, he was one of the original draft picks of the new American Football League (AFL) Buffalo Bills franchise. However, he chose to play for the National Football League (NFL) St. Louis Cardinals instead, playing 10 games as an offensive guard, before being released the following year. He then played for the Bills, eventually transitioning to starting defensive end in 1964. He was part of a Bills' defense that did not allow a rushing touchdown for 17 consecutive games over a portion of the 1964 and 1965 seasons, winning the American Football League Championship in both years. Day said of winning the AFL championship, "Winning the championship is like making love to the most beautiful woman in the world." He was an AFL All-Star in 1965. In March 1967, he was traded to the San Diego Chargers for running back Keith Lincoln. He played one season with the Chargers. After being cut the following year, he rejoined the Bills for his final season. Over nine seasons, he played 96 games with the Bills, 11 with the Chargers and 10 with the Cardinals.

In 1971, he was hired as a defensive line coach by the Bills, but when the head coach was replaced, Day was reassigned to scouting, lasting one year.

For his work helping indigent NFL former players, Day received the NFLPA Award of Excellence in 1997.

He worked in radio sales and as a youth counselor and a teacher in the Buffalo school system, before becoming a supervisor at Harrison Radiator in 1977. He worked there until his death at the age of 65.

== See also ==
- List of American Football League players
