= Johnny Green (gridiron football) =

American gridiron football player (1937–2019)

No. 91, 18, 12
- Position: Quarterback

Personal information
- Born: October 12, 1937; West Point, Mississippi, U.S.
- Died: April 24, 2019 (aged 81)
- Listed height: 6 ft 3 in (1.91 m)
- Listed weight: 198 lb (90 kg)

Career information
- High school: West Point
- College: Chattanooga
- NFL draft: 1959: 21st round, 247th overall pick

Career history
- Toronto Argonauts (1959); Buffalo Bills (1960-1961); New York Titans / Jets (1962-1963); Boston Sweepers (1964)

Career AFL statistics
- Passing attempts: 618
- Passing completions: 275
- Completion percentage: 44.5%
- TD–INT: 26–34
- Passing yards: 3,921
- Passer rating: 56.7
- Stats at Pro Football Reference

John Edward Green (October 12, 1937 – April 24, 2019) was an American professional football player who was a quarterback with the Buffalo Bills and the New York Titans in the American Football League (AFL) for four seasons and the Toronto Argonauts in the Canadian Football League (CFL) for one campaign (1964). He played college football with the University of Chattanooga Moccasins.

== Playing career ==
The Pittsburgh Steelers drafted Green in the 21st round of the 1960 NFL draft, but with established star Bobby Layne at the top of the depth chart, he knew opportunities to play would be scarce. Like a number of young players in the same predicament, he decided to head north to the Canadian Football League instead. Green agreed to terms with the Toronto Argonauts, played two games as a back-up quarterback and punter then was released.

The Steelers extended a second tryout offer to Green prior to the 1960 season, when he was released at the close of training camp. Rather than spend the upcoming season on the Steelers taxi squad, head coach Buddy Parker suggested that he contact the Buffalo Bills of the rival American Football League, which was about to make its debut. Bills head coach Buster Ramsey had been the defensive coordinator of the Detroit Lions while Parker served as their head coach.

No sooner did Green agree to terms with the Bills than he earned the job as their No. 1 quarterback in the preseason. The rookie started the first five games in the regular season, two of them victories. Included was a 25-24 upset of the eventual league champions Houston Oilers in Buffalo, a game in which he passed for a career-high 334 yards and two touchdowns. Struggles with accuracy and inexperience coupled with porous line play convinced Ramsey to make a position change. Green was replaced by veteran Tommy O'Connell in Week 6 and played sparingly the rest of the season.

The retirement of O'Connell allowed Green to reclaim the starter position, only to have a separated shoulder delay his start to the 1962 season. He returned in October to play eight games and split six of his starts. After a second consecutive sub-.500 finish, the Bills hired Lou Saban as head coach and acquired veteran quarterback Al Dorow from the New York Titans in return for Green and safety Billy Atkins in a three-player trade.

== See also ==
- Other American Football League players
