= Buster Ramsey =

American football player and coach (1920–2007)

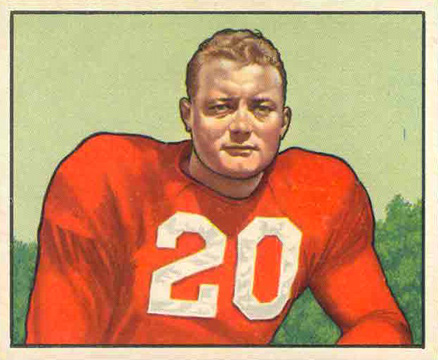
- Ramsey on a 1950 Bowman football card

No. 20
- Positions: Guard; Linebacker

Personal information
- Born: March 16, 1920; Townsend, Tennessee, U.S.
- Died: September 16, 2007 (aged 87); Signal Mountain, Tennessee, U.S.
- Listed height: 6 ft 1 in (1.85 m)
- Listed weight: 219 lb (99 kg)

Career information
- High school: Knoxville (TN)
- College: William & Mary
- NFL draft: 1943: 14th round, 124th overall pick

Career history

Playing
- Chicago Cardinals (1946–1951)

Coaching
- Chicago Cardinals (1951) Defensive coordinator; Detroit Lions (1952–1959) Defensive coordinator; Buffalo Bills (1960–1961) Head coach; Pittsburgh Steelers (1962–1964) Defensive coordinator

Awards and highlights
- NFL champion (1947); 2× First-team All-Pro (1948, 1949); 2× Second-team All-Pro (1947, 1950); NFL 1940s All-Decade Team; First-team All-American (1942); 2× First-team All-SoCon (1941, 1942)

Career NFL statistics
- Games played: 57
- Games started: 51
- Fumble recoveries: 4
- Stats at Pro Football Reference

Head coaching record
- Regular season: 11–16–1 (.411)
- Coaching profile at Pro Football Reference
- College Football Hall of Fame

Garrard Sliger "Buster" Ramsey (March 16, 1920 – September 16, 2007) was an American professional football player for the College of William and Mary and Chicago Cardinals. He was defensive coordinator for three Detroit Lions championship teams in the National Football League (NFL) in the 1950s before he became the first head coach of the Buffalo Bills in the rival American Football League.

== Playing career ==
After a stint in the United States Navy during World War II, Ramsey played for the Chicago Cardinals from 1946 to 1951. During his time there, Ramsey was a member of the 1947 NFL World Championship team.

== Coaching career ==
In 1951, Ramsey served as a player-coach for the Cardinals before becoming the Detroit Lions’ defensive coordinator in 1952. During his tenure with the Lions, Ramsey developed the 4-3 defense, a staple of modern football. In addition, he was among the first coaches to blitz linebackers in a package called Red Dog. With Ramsey as defensive coordinator the Lions won three World Championships in the 1950s. He developed a number of Lions greats including future Hall of Famers Jack Christiansen, Yale Lary and Joe Schmidt among others.

In 1960, Ralph C. Wilson Jr. purchased the Buffalo Bills franchise in the fledging American Football League. Wilson did so with visions of another 1950s Detroit Lions dynasty -- his new team even adopted their silver-and-blue color scheme. Given his Lions pedigree, Ramsey was considered to be the ideal candidate for the head coach position as one of the first significant hires in the organization.

The Bills struggled to score points in their first two seasons, which often negated their stellar play at the other side of the ball. Ramsey was fired after the 1961 AFL season, but not before he laid the foundation for a defense that would become the foundation for 1964 and 1965 league championship teams. He would go on to serve as the defensive coordinator for the Pittsburgh Steelers from 1962 to 1964.

== Personal life ==
Ramsey had a brother, Knox Ramsey, who also played for the College of William and Mary, and later professionally for the Chicago Cardinals and Washington Redskins. Ramsey was elected into the Virginia Sports Hall of Fame in 1974, and the College Football Hall of Fame in 1978.

== Head coaching record ==
| Team | Year | Regular season | | | | | Postseason | | | |
| Team | Year | Won | Lost | Ties | Win % | Finish | Won | Lost | Win % | Result |
|---|---|---|---|---|---|---|---|---|---|---|
| BUF | 1960 | 5 | 8 | 1 | .393 | 3rd in AFL Eastern | – | – | – | – |
| BUF | 1961 | 6 | 8 | 0 | .429 | 4th in AFL Eastern | – | – | – | – |
| BUF Total | | 11 | 16 | 1 | .411 | | – | – | – | – |
| AFL Total | | 11 | 16 | 1 | .411 | | – | – | – | – |
| Total | | 11 | 16 | 1 | .411 | | – | – | – | – |

== See also ==
- List of American Football League players
