= 1962 American Football League season =

American Football League season

1962 AFL season

Regular season
- Duration: September 7 – December 16, 1962

Playoffs
- Date: December 23, 1962
- Eastern champion: Houston Oilers
- Western champion: Dallas Texans
- Site: Jeppesen Stadium, Houston, Texas
- Champion: Dallas Texans

AFL teams: West, East

The 1962 AFL season was the third regular season of the American Football League. It consisted of 8 franchises split into two divisions: the East Division (Buffalo Bills, Houston Oilers, Titans of New York, Boston Patriots) and the West Division (San Diego Chargers, Denver Broncos, Dallas Texans, Oakland Raiders).

The season ended when the Texans defeated the Houston Oilers in the AFL Championship game.

== Division races ==
The AFL had 8 teams, grouped into two divisions. Each team would play a home-and-away game against the other 7 teams in the league for a total of 14 games, and the best team in the Eastern Division would play against the best in the Western Division in a championship game. If there was a tie in the standings at the top of either division, a one-game playoff would be held to determine the division winner.

The 1962 season started out as a race between Houston and Boston in the East, and Dallas and Denver in the West. After seven games, the Broncos were 6–1–0 and the Texans right behind at 5–1–0, while Boston and Houston were tied at 4–2–0.

In Week Eight, Buffalo beat Denver 45–38, while Dallas won at Houston, 31–7. The Oilers' loss, and Boston's 26–16 win over Oakland, put the Patriots and Texans at the top of their divisions. The next week, though, Houston won its rematch at Dallas, 14–6, and though it did not help the Oilers, Denver made a comeback to win 23–20 at San Diego to reclaim the division lead on November 4. In Week Ten, Boston beat Denver 33–29. Houston stayed half a game behind Boston, while Dallas pulled half a game ahead of Denver.

In Week Eleven (November 18), Houston won at Boston, 21–17, to reclaim the East, and Dallas won 24–3 at Denver to boost its lead. Houston and Boston continued to win, but in the final week, the Oilers clinched the division with a 44–10 win over the Titans.

Week	Eastern		Western	
1	Tie (Hou, TNY)	1–0–0	Tie (Dal, Den)	1–0–0
2	(Bos, Hou, TNY)	1–1–0	Tie (Den, Dal)	2–0–0
3	(Bos, Hou, TNY)	2–1–0	Dallas Texans	2–0–0
4	Tie (Bos, Hou)	2–1–0	Dallas Texans	3–0–0
5	Tie (Bos, Hou)	3–1–0	Denver Broncos	4–1–0
6	Houston Oilers	4–1–0	Denver Broncos	5–1–0
7	Tie (Bos, Hou)	4–2–0	Denver Broncos	6–1–0
8	Boston Patriots	5–2–0	Dallas Texans	6–1–0
9	Boston Patriots	5–2–1	Denver Broncos	7–2–0
10	Boston Patriots	6–2–1	Dallas Texans	7–2–0
11	Houston Oilers	7–3–0	Dallas Texans	8–2–0
12	Houston Oilers	8–3–0	Dallas Texans	9–2–0
13	Houston Oilers	9–3–0	Dallas Texans	9–3–0
14	Houston Oilers	10–3–0	Dallas Texans	10–3–0
15	Houston Oilers	11–3–0	Dallas Texans	11–3–0

== Regular season ==
=== Results ===
Home/Road		Eastern Division				Western Division			
Home/Road		BOS	BUF	HOU	NY	DAL	DEN	OAK	SD
Eastern	Boston Patriots		21–10	34–21	24–17	7–27	41–16	26–16	24–20
Eastern	Buffalo Bills	28–28		23–28	6–17	23–14	20–23	14–6	35–10
Eastern	Houston Oilers	21–17	17–14		56–17	7–31	34–17	32–17	33–27
Eastern	Titans of New York	14–43	3–20	10–44		31–52	10–32	31–21	23–3
Western	Dallas Texans	42–28	41–21	6–14	20–17		17–10	35–7	26–17
Western	Denver Broncos	29–33	38–45	20–10	45–46	3–24		44–7	30–21
Western	Oakland Raiders	20–0	6–10	20–28	17–28	16–26	6–23		33–42
Western	San Diego Chargers	14–20	20–40	17–42	40–14	32–28	20–23	31–21	

=== Standings ===
AFL Eastern Division
	W	L	T	PCT	DIV	PF	PA	STK
Houston Oilers	11	3	0	.786	5–1	387	270	W7
Boston Patriots	9	4	1	.692	4–1–1	346	295	L1
Buffalo Bills	7	6	1	.538	1–4–1	309	272	W2
New York Titans	5	9	0	.357	1–5	278	423	L3

Note: Tie games were not officially counted in the standings in the AFL.

AFL Western Division
	W	L	T	PCT	DIV	PF	PA	STK
Dallas Texans	11	3	0	.786	5–1	389	233	W2
Denver Broncos	7	7	0	.500	4–2	353	334	L5
San Diego Chargers	4	10	0	.286	3–3	314	392	L2
Oakland Raiders	1	13	0	.071	0–6	213	370	W1

== Playoffs ==
AFL Championship Game
December 23, 1962 – Jeppesen Stadium
Dallas Texans (2OT)	20
Houston Oilers	17

== Awards ==
Most Valuable Player	Cookie Gilchrist, fullback, Buffalo Bills; Len Dawson, quarterback, Dallas Texans
Coach of the Year	Jack Faulkner, Denver Broncos
Rookie of the Year	Curtis McClinton, fullback, Dallas Texans
1962 All-AFL Team

== Stadium changes ==
- The Oakland Raiders moved from Candlestick Park in San Francisco to Frank Youell Field in Oakland

== Coaching changes ==
=== Offseason ===
- Boston Patriots: Mike Holovak began his first full season as Boston's head coach. He took over the head coaching duties after Lou Saban was fired after five games in 1961.
- Buffalo Bills: Buster Ramsey was fired and replaced by Lou Saban.
- Denver Broncos: Frank Filchock was fired and replaced by Jack Faulkner.
- Houston Oilers: Pop Ivy was named as the Oilers new head coach. Lou Rymkus was fired after five games in 1961, and assistant coach Wally Lemm took over the head coaching duties for the rest of that season.
- New York Titans: Sammy Baugh was replaced by Bulldog Turner.

=== In-season ===
- Oakland Raiders: Marty Feldman was fired after five games. Red Conkright served as interim for the rest of the season.
