= 1960 American Football League season =

NFL season

1960 AFL season

Regular season
- Duration: September 9 – December 18, 1960

Playoffs
- Date: January 1, 1961
- Eastern champion: Houston Oilers
- Western champion: Los Angeles Chargers
- Site: Jeppesen Stadium, Houston, Texas
- Champion: Houston Oilers

AFL teams: West, East

The 1960 AFL season was the inaugural regular season of the American Football League. It consisted of 8 franchises split into two divisions: the East Division (Buffalo Bills, Houston Oilers, Titans of New York, Boston Patriots) and the West Division (Los Angeles Chargers, Denver Broncos, Dallas Texans, Oakland Raiders).

The season ended when the Houston Oilers defeated the Los Angeles Chargers 24–16 in the inaugural AFL Championship game.

== Division races ==
The AFL had 8 teams, grouped into two divisions. Each team would play a home-and-away game against the other 7 teams in the league for a total of 14 games, and the best team in the Eastern Division would play against the best in the Western Division in a championship game. If there was a tie in the standings at the top of either division, a one-game playoff would be held to determine the division winner.

The Denver Broncos, who would not have a winning season until they went 7–5–2 in 1973, were the Western Division leaders halfway through 1960. They won the AFL's first game, played on Friday night, September 9, 1960, beating the Boston Patriots 13–10. The Patriots' Gino Cappelletti scored the AFL's first points with a 35-yard field goal. Other results in Week One were the Los Angeles Chargers 21–20 win over the Dallas Texans, the Houston Oilers 37–22 win over the Oakland Raiders, and the Titans of New York 27–3 win over the Buffalo Bills. In the Raiders game, J. D. Smith caught a pass from Tom Flores to score the first two-point conversion in pro football history.

In Week Eight (October 30), Denver lost to the visiting Texans, 17–14, and did not win any of their last eight games, finishing with the AFL's worst record at 4–9–1. The Chargers, still in Los Angeles, pulled ahead the next week with a Friday night win over the Titans of New York, 21–7, and finished at 10–4–0. The Eastern Division lead was held by Houston, except for a setback from a 14–13 loss to Oakland on September 25. In Week Five, the Oilers beat the visiting Titans, 27–21 and led the rest of the way.

Week	Eastern		Western	
1	Tie (Hou, TNY)	1–0–0	Tie (Den, LAC)	1–0–0
2	Houston Oilers	2–0–0	Denver Broncos	2–0–0
3	Tie (Hou, TNY)	2–1–0	Tie (DalT, Den)	2–1–0
4	Titans of New York	3–1–0	Denver Broncos	3–1–0
5	Houston Oilers	3–1–0	Denver Broncos	3–1–0
6	Houston Oilers	4–1–0	Denver Broncos	3–2–0
7	Houston Oilers	5–1–0	Denver Broncos	4–2–0
8	Houston Oilers	5–2–0	Tie (Den, LAC)	4–3–0
9	Houston Oilers	6–2–0	L.A. Chargers	5–3–0
10	Houston Oilers	6–3–0	L.A. Chargers	6–3–0
11	Houston Oilers	7–3–0	L.A. Chargers	6–4–0
12	Houston Oilers	8–3–0	L.A. Chargers	7–4–0
13	Houston Oilers	8–4–0	L.A. Chargers	8–4–0
14	Houston Oilers	9–4–0	L.A. Chargers	9–4–0
15	Houston Oilers	10–4–0	L.A. Chargers	10–4–0

== Regular season ==
=== Results of the 1960 AFL season ===
Home/Road		Eastern Division				Western Division			
Home/Road		BOS	BUF	HOU	NY	DAL	DEN	LA	OAK
Eastern	Boston Patriots		0–13	10–24	38–21	42–14	10–13	16–45	34–28
Eastern	Buffalo Bills	38–14		25–24	13–17	28–45	21–27	10–24	38–9
Eastern	Houston Oilers	37–21	31–23		27–21	20–10	20–10	38–28	13–14
Eastern	Titans of New York	24–28	27–3	28–42		41–35	28–24	7–21	27–28
Western	Dallas Texans	34–0	24–7	24–0	35–37		34–7	17–0	19–20
Western	Denver Broncos	31–24	38–38	25–45	27–30	14–17		19–23	31–14
Western	Los Angeles Chargers	0–35	3–32	24–21	50–43	21–20	41–33		52–28
Western	Oakland Raiders	27–14	20–7	22–37	28–31	16–34	48–10	17–41	

=== Standings ===
AFL Eastern Division
	W	L	T	PCT	DIV	PF	PA	STK
Houston Oilers	10	4	0	.714	5–1	379	285	W2
New York Titans	7	7	0	.500	2–4	382	399	L1
Buffalo Bills	5	8	1	.385	3–3	296	303	L2
Boston Patriots	5	9	0	.357	2–4	286	349	L4

Note: Tie games were not officially counted in the standings in the AFL.

AFL Western Division
	W	L	T	PCT	DIV	PF	PA	STK
Los Angeles Chargers	10	4	0	.714	5–1	373	336	W4
Dallas Texans	8	6	0	.571	4–2	362	253	W3
Oakland Raiders	6	8	0	.429	2–4	319	388	W1
Denver Broncos	4	9	1	.308	1–5	309	393	L3

== Playoffs ==
AFL Championship Game
January 1, 1961 – Jeppesen Stadium
Los Angeles Chargers	16
Houston Oilers	24

== Statistics ==
=== Quarterback ===
Player	Comp.	Att.	Comp%	Yards	TD's	INT's
Frank Tripucka (DEN)	248	478	51.8	3038	24	34
Jack Kemp (LA)	211	406	52	3018	20	25
Al Dorow (NYT)	201	396	50.8	2748	26	26
Butch Songin (BOS)	187	392	47.7	2476	22	15
Cotton Davidson (DAL)	179	379	47.2	2474	15	16
George Blanda (HOU)	169	363	46.6	2413	24	22
Tom Flores (OAK)	136	252	54	1738	12	12
Johnny Green (BUF)	89	228	39	1267	10	10
Babe Parilli (OAK)	87	187	46.5	1003	5	11
Tommy O'Connell (BUF)	65	145	44.8	1033	7	13
Dick Jamieson (TNY)	35	70	50	586	6	2

== Awards ==
- AP AFL Player of The Year: Abner Haynes, Dallas Texans
- UPI AFL Player of The Year: Abner Haynes, Dallas Texans

== Stadiums ==
The AFL began play with the following stadiums:

AFL Eastern Division

- Boston: Nickerson Field
- Buffalo: War Memorial Stadium
- Houston: Jeppesen Stadium
- New York: Polo Grounds

AFL Western Division

- Dallas: Cotton Bowl
- Denver: Bears Stadium
- Los Angeles: Los Angeles Memorial Coliseum
- Oakland: Kezar Stadium in San Francisco

== Coaches ==
The AFL began play with the following head coaches:

AFL Eastern Division

- Boston: Lou Saban
- Buffalo: Buster Ramsey
- Houston: Lou Rymkus
- New York: Sammy Baugh

AFL Western Division

- Dallas: Hank Stram
- Denver: Frank Filchock
- Los Angeles: Sid Gillman
- Oakland: Eddie Erdelatz
