= Buffalo Bills all-time roster =

1,456 players have appeared in at least one regular season or postseason game in the National Football League (NFL) or American Football League (AFL) for the Buffalo Bills since 1960. This list is accurate through the end of the 2025 NFL season.

== A ==
- Ray Abruzzese
- Bill Acker
- Bill Adams
- Johnny Adams
- Sam Adams
- Mario Addison
- Chidi Ahanotu
- Kamar Aiken
- Sam Aiken
- Bryson Albright
- Ethan Albright
- Ira Albright
- Glenn Alexander
- Lorenzo Alexander
- Maurice Alexander
- Mike Alexander
- Bruce Alford Jr.
- Doug Allen
- Jackie Allen
- Josh Allen
- Kyle Allen
- Kiko Alonso
- Steve Alvers
- Alec Anderson
- André Anderson
- Bennie Anderson
- Colt Anderson
- Derek Anderson
- Mark Anderson
- Max Anderson
- Tim Anderson
- William Anderson
- Joe Andreessen
- Al Andrews
- Eli Ankou
- Jake Arians
- Justin Armour
- John Armstrong
- Mark Asper
- Bill Atkins
- Joe Auer
- Rob Awalt
- Akin Ayodele
- Joe Azelby

== B ==
- Michael Badgley
- Carlton Bailey
- Teddy Bailey
- Art Baker
- Rashad Baker
- Gary Baldinger
- Howard Ballard
- Mike Balogun
- Justin Bannan
- Bradford Banta
- Joe Banyard
- Stew Barber
- Matt Barkley
- Darian Barnes
- T. J. Barnes
- Buster Barnett
- Nick Barnett
- Oliver Barnett
- Bob Barrett
- Boogie Basham
- Glenn Bass
- Tyler Bass
- Marv Bateman
- Ryan Bates
- Danny Batten
- David Bavaro
- Martin Bayless
- Tim Beamer
- Tom Beard
- Cole Beasley
- Doug Becker
- Nate Becker
- Don Beebe
- Dave Behrman
- Veno Belk
- Demetress Bell
- Greg Bell
- Rodney Bellinger
- Al Bemiller
- Carey Bender
- Christian Benford
- Kelvin Benjamin
- Cornelius Bennett
- Ray Bentley
- Terrel Bernard
- Gerald Bess
- Rufus Bess
- Cole Bishop
- Charlie Bivins
- Avion Black
- Robert Blanton
- Phil Blazer
- Drew Bledsoe
- Joe Bock
- Russell Bodine
- Ike Boettger
- Dewey Bohling
- Corey Bojorquez
- Victor Bolden
- Jon Borchardt
- Nate Borden
- Breon Borders
- Joey Bosa
- Jason Bostic
- Matt Bowen
- Jerry Boyarsky
- Nigel Bradham
- Kerry Brady
- Mark Brammer
- Alan Branch
- Dan Brandenburg
- Chris Brantley
- Jason Bratton
- Jack Bravyak
- Hezekiah Braxton
- Jim Braxton
- Matt Breida
- C. J. Brewer
- Marlin Briscoe
- Kevin Brock
- Bob Brodhead
- Brian Brohm
- Mitchell Brookins
- Ahmad Brooks
- Bill Brooks
- Bucky Brooks
- Clifford Brooks
- Ron Brooks
- Walter Broughton
- Antonio Brown
- Bryce Brown
- Charlie Brown
- Colin Brown
- Curtis Brown
- Fred Brown
- John Brown
- Lance Brown
- Levi Brown
- Marc Brown
- Monty Brown
- Preston Brown
- Ruben Brown
- Sergio Brown
- Spencer Brown
- Tony Brown
- Travis Brown
- Zach Brown
- Dick Brubaker
- Copeland Bryan
- Brandin Bryant
- Corbin Bryant
- Shawn Bryson
- Gary Bugenhagen
- Marcus Buggs
- Chris Burkett
- Bobby Burnett
- Joe Burns
- Jeff Burris
- Derrick Burroughs
- Brandon Burton
- Leonard Burton
- Rafael Bush
- Reggie Bush
- Brad Butler
- Crezdon Butler
- Jerametrius Butler
- Jerry Butler
- Mario Butler
- Vernon Butler
- Bernard Buzyniski
- Reggie Bynum
- Butch Byrd
- Jairus Byrd
- Carl Byrum

== C ==
- Travaris Cadet
- Bill Cahill
- Darryl Caldwell
- Don Calhoun
- Bill Callahan
- Arnold Campbell
- Mark Campbell
- Joe Cannavino
- Cap Capi
- Bob Cappadona
- Richard Carey
- Wray Carlton
- Jon Carman
- Brian Carpenter
- Dan Carpenter
- Keion Carpenter
- Levert Carr
- Alex Carrington
- DeWayne Carter
- Matt Cassel
- Mark Catano
- Greg Cater
- Jehuu Caulcrick
- Mike Caussin
- Kwame Cavil
- Mario Celotto
- Larry Centers
- Dan Chamberlain
- Kirk Chambers
- Bob Chandler
- Edgar Chandler
- Scott Chandler
- David Chapple
- Stefan Charles
- Carl Charon
- Richard Cheek
- Donald Chelf
- Joe Chetti
- Jim Cheyunski
- Tashard Choice
- Gerald Christian
- Bob Christiansen
- Steve Christie
- Greg Christy
- Jimmy Ciarlo
- Brad Cieslak
- Lewis Cine
- Will Clapp
- Allan Clark
- Mario Clark
- Steve Clark
- Hagood Clarke
- Charles Clay
- Kaelin Clay
- Nate Clements
- Kameron Cline
- Tony Cline Jr.
- Ross Cockrell
- Sherman Cocroft
- Brandon Codrington
- Tim Cofield
- Will Cokeley
- Linzy Cole
- Antonio Coleman
- Clarence Coleman
- Deandre Coleman
- Fred Coleman
- Keon Coleman
- Kurt Coleman
- Mike Collier
- Bobby Collins
- Greg Collins
- Jerald Collins
- Todd Collins
- Bill Conaty
- Shane Conlan
- James Cook
- Brandin Cooks
- Rob Coons
- Amari Cooper
- Russell Copeland
- Bo Cornell
- Reggie Corner
- Frank Cornish Jr.
- Jon Corto
- Dave Costa
- Paul Costa
- Blake Costanzo
- Brandon Coutu
- Damien Covington
- Sam Cowart
- Al Cowlings
- Bryan Cox Jr.
- Jerry Crafts
- Neal Craig
- Reggie Craig
- Hilton Crawford
- Joe Cribbs
- Bobby Crockett
- Monte Crockett
- Don Croft
- Jason Croom
- Phil Crosby
- Justin Cross
- Jim Crotty
- Wayne Crow
- Jamison Crowder
- Angelo Crowell
- Phil Croyle
- Walt Cudzik
- George Cumby
- Joe Cummings
- Billy Cundiff
- Dick Cunningham
- Jeff Curchin

== D ==
- Brad Daluiso
- Joe Danelo
- Matt Darby
- Ronald Darby
- Marcell Dareus
- Matt Darr
- Dan Darragh
- Stan David
- Zach Davidson
- Andra Davis
- André Davis
- Gabe Davis
- John Davis
- Kenneth Davis
- Ray Davis
- Ryan Davis
- Vontae Davis
- Wayne Davis
- Dion Dawkins
- Julius Dawkins
- Tom Day
- Larry Dean
- Branson Deen
- Joe DeLamielleure
- Jerry DeLucca
- Tom Dempsey
- Anthony Denman
- Preston Dennard
- Austin Denney
- Ryan Denney
- Wayne DeSutter
- Jordan Devey
- Chuck DeVleigher
- Joe Devlin
- Mike Devlin
- Anthony Dickerson
- Dorin Dickerson
- Stefon Diggs
- John DiGiorgio
- Patrick DiMarco
- Tony Discenzo
- John Dittrich
- Anthony Dixon
- Ollie Dobbins
- Conrad Dobler
- Derrick Dockery
- Tyrel Dodson
- Phil Dokes
- Gene Donaldson
- Jon Dorenbos
- Al Dorow
- Lionel Dotson
- Jamil Douglas
- Rasul Douglas
- Leger Douzable
- Sean Dowling
- Marcus Dowtin
- Tommy Doyle
- Chris Draft
- Dwight Drane
- Jim Dray
- Tony Driver
- Elbert Drungo
- Elbert Dubenion
- Vladimir Ducasse
- Joe Dufek
- Mike Dumas
- Jim Dunaway
- Bill Dunstan

== E ==
- Quinn Early
- Marcus Easley
- Robert Eddins
- Booker Edgerson
- Tremaine Edmunds
- Al Edwards
- David Edwards
- Dwan Edwards
- Earl Edwards
- Emmett Edwards
- Mike Edwards
- Ron Edwards
- Trent Edwards
- Tom Ehlers
- Kaiir Elam
- Chris Ellis
- Keith Ellison
- Trae Elston
- Prince Emili
- IK Enemkpali
- Bill Enyart
- A. J. Epenesa
- Tom Erlandson
- Mike Estep
- Tim Euhus
- Greg Evans
- Lee Evans
- Kevin Everett
- Liam Ezekiel

== F ==
- Dale Farley
- Kris Farris
- Greg Favors
- Jon Feliciano
- Jerome Felton
- Ralph Felton
- Duke Fergerson
- Charley Ferguson
- Joe Ferguson
- Reid Ferguson
- Vince Ferragamo
- John Fina
- Derek Fine
- Bryce Fisher
- Ryan Fitzpatrick
- London Fletcher
- George Flint
- Judson Flint
- Drayton Florence
- Tom Flores
- Erik Flowers
- Leonard Floyd
- Marcus Floyd
- Doug Flutie
- Dave Foley
- Charlie Ford
- Cody Ford
- Cole Ford
- Fred Ford
- Keith Ford
- Poona Ford
- Jay Foreman
- Fred Forsberg
- Robert Foster
- Leonard Fournette
- Melvin Fowler
- Wayne Fowler
- Willmer Fowler
- Dustin Fox
- Morgan Fox
- Wallace Francis
- Mike Franckowiak
- Byron Franklin
- Sam Franklin Jr.
- John Frantz
- Guy Frazier
- Wayne Frazier
- Steve Freeman
- Mitch Frerotte
- Larry Friday
- Eddie Fuller
- Danny Fulton
- Ed Fulton
- Tony Furjanic

== G ==
- Bob Gaddis
- Christian Gaddis
- E. J. Gaines
- Michael Gaines
- Phillip Gaines
- Sheldon Gaines
- Mitchell Galloway
- Mike Gandy
- Reuben Gant
- Quinton Ganther
- Jerry Gantt
- Carwell Gardner
- Hal Garner
- Scott Garnett
- Leon Garror
- Shamiel Gary
- Sam Gash
- Jordan Gay
- Cory Geason
- Stan Gelbaugh
- Tanner Gentry
- Reggie Germany
- Gale Gilbert
- Cookie Gilchrist
- Joe Giles-Harris
- Reggie Gilliam
- Mike Gillislee
- Stephon Gilmore
- Bob Gladieux
- Cordy Glenn
- Clyde Glosson
- Keith Goganious
- Pete Gogolak
- Doug Goodwin
- Marquise Goodwin
- Lennox Gordon
- Frank Gore
- Frank Gore Jr.
- Richard Gouraige
- Tylan Grable
- Gene Grabosky
- Chris Gragg
- Corey Graham
- Don Graham
- Shayne Graham
- T. J. Graham
- Tom Graham
- Wes Grant
- Will Grant
- Willie Grate
- MarQueis Gray
- Chris Green
- Cornell Green
- Donnie Green
- Johnny Green
- Van Green
- Doug Greene
- Tony Greene
- Donovan Greer
- Jabari Greer
- Ben Gregory
- Bill Groman
- Glenn Gronkowski
- Ryan Groy
- Paul Guidry
- Grant Guthrie

== H ==
- Matt Haack
- Drew Haddad
- Derek Hagan
- Halvor Hagen
- Mario Haggan
- Odell Haggins
- John Hagy
- Kris Haines
- Chris Hairston
- Maxwell Hairston
- Chris Hale
- Mike Hamby
- Damar Hamlin
- Jordan Hancock
- Geoff Hangartner
- Leonard Hankerson
- Phil Hansen
- Dee Hardison
- Mecole Hardman
- James Hardy
- Anthony Hargrove
- Ronnie Harmon
- Darrell Harper
- Cary Harris
- Damien Harris
- James Harris
- Nic Harris
- Dwight Harrison
- Kevin Harrison
- Bobby Hart
- Dick Hart
- Leo Hart
- Deonte Harty
- Richard Harvey
- Waddey Harvey
- Percy Harvin
- Clint Haslerig
- Jim Haslett
- Rickey Hatley
- Steven Hauschka
- Jackson Hawes
- Gary Hayman
- Don Healy
- Kellen Heard
- Clayton Heath
- Craig Heimburger
- Dale Hellestrae
- Jerome Henderson
- Seantrel Henderson
- Carey Henley
- Nick Hennessey
- Travis Henry
- Joe Hergert
- Scott Hernandez
- Efren Herrera
- Dan Herron
- Bob Hews
- Cliff Hicks
- Robert Hicks
- Tom Higgins
- Ike Hill
- J. D. Hill
- Raion Hill
- Ray Hill
- Rod Hill
- Nyheim Hines
- Billy Joe Hobert
- Isaiah Hodgins
- Michael Hoecht
- Chris Hogan
- Al Hoisington
- Kelly Holcomb
- John Holecek
- John Holland
- Mack Hollins
- Mike Hollis
- Andre Holmes
- Darick Holmes
- Mike Holmes
- Robert Holt
- Roland Hooks
- Mike Houghton
- Cordaro Howard
- Ron Howard
- Delano Howell
- Steve Hoyem
- Paul Hubbard
- Floyd Hudlow
- Dick Hudson
- Jerry Hughes
- Kent Hull
- Corey Hulsey
- Ramon Humber
- Mike Humiston
- David Humm
- Jeff Hunter
- Justin Hunter
- Scott Hunter
- Tony Hunter
- Bill Hurley
- Chuck Hurston
- Scott Hutchinson
- Anthony Hutchison
- Micah Hyde

== I ==
- Mekeli Ieremia
- James Ihedigbo
- Gabe Ikard
- Richie Incognito
- Ja'Marcus Ingram
- Grant Irons
- Darrell Irvin
- Ken Irvin
- Andy Isabella
- Chris Ivory

== J ==
- Dane Jackson
- Fred Jackson
- Kareem Jackson
- Kirby Jackson
- Landon Jackson
- Randy Jackson
- Raymond Jackson
- Rusty Jackson
- Sheldon Jackson
- Frank Jackunas
- Harry Jacobs
- George Jakowenko
- Robert James
- Tom Janik
- Bruce Jarvis
- Ray Jarvis
- Jim Jeffcoat
- Jason Jefferson
- Quinton Jefferson
- Billy Jenkins
- Ed Jenkins
- Justin Jenkins
- Keonta Jenkins
- Jonas Jennings
- Greg Jerman
- Ron Jessie
- Dan Jilek
- Billy Joe
- Leon Joe
- Austin Johnson
- Charles Johnson
- Darryl Johnson
- Dennis Johnson (born 1951)
- Dennis Johnson (born 1956)
- Dontae Johnson
- Duke Johnson
- Filmel Johnson
- Flip Johnson
- Jack Johnson
- Jaquan Johnson
- Ken Johnson
- Kevin Johnson
- Lawrence Johnson
- Leonard Johnson
- Lonnie Johnson
- Mark Johnson
- Randell Johnson
- Rob Johnson
- Spencer Johnson
- Stevie Johnson
- Taron Johnson
- Todd Johnson
- Trumaine Johnson
- Ty Johnson
- Cameron Johnston
- Kingsley Jonathan
- Andre Jones Jr.
- Cardale Jones
- DaQuan Jones
- Donald Jones
- Doug Jones
- Ed Jones
- Fred Jones
- Greg Jones
- Henry Jones
- Ken Jones
- Mike Jones
- Spike Jones
- Steve Jones
- Taiwan Jones
- Willie Jones
- Zay Jones
- Linval Joseph
- Yonel Jourdain
- Matthew Judon
- Trey Junkin

== K ==
- Mike Kadish
- John Kaiser
- Bob Kalsu
- Bob Kampa
- Chris Keating
- Tom Keating
- Case Keenum
- Ernie Kellermann
- Jim Kelly
- Chris Kelsay
- Mark Kelso
- Jack Kemp
- Mike Kennedy
- Jeremy Kerley
- Don Kern
- Rex Kern
- Marlon Kerner
- John Kidd
- David Kilson
- John Kimbrough
- Billy Kinard
- Dalton Kincaid
- Howard Kindig
- Bruce King
- Charlie King
- Eric King
- Tony King
- Rick Kingrea
- Larry Kinnebrew
- Jeff Kinney
- A. J. Klein
- Joe Klopfenstein
- Dawson Knox
- Roger Kochman
- Matt Kofler
- Cyrus Kouandjio
- Ted Koy
- Merv Krakau
- Tyler Kroft
- Bob Kruse
- Larry Kubin
- Joe Kulbacki
- Jake Kumerow
- Rod Kush

== L ==
- Deon Lacey
- Corbin Lacina
- Kenny Ladler
- Kevin Lamar
- Brad Lamb
- Daryle Lamonica
- Ellis Lankster
- Jack Laraway
- Leif Olve Dolonen Larsen
- Bill Laskey
- Art Laster
- Keleki Latu
- Jerry Lawson
- Manny Lawson
- Shaq Lawson
- Roosevelt Leaks
- Bob LeBlanc
- Monte Ledbetter
- Darron Lee
- Ken Lee
- Khari Lee
- Doug Legursky
- Teddy Lehman
- Jim LeMoine
- Chuck Leo
- Jim Leonhard
- Cotton Letner
- Mike Levenseller
- Andy Levitre
- Cam Lewis
- Dezmin Lewis
- Frank Lewis
- Hal Lewis (1935)
- John Lewis
- Patrick Lewis
- Rich Lewis
- Ryan Lewis
- Thad Lewis
- John Leypoldt
- Keith Lincoln
- Rian Lindell
- Adam Lingner
- Jonathan Linton
- John Little
- Corey Liuget
- Greg Lloyd, Jr.
- Jeff Lloyd
- Mike Lodish
- James Lofton
- Zion Logue
- Carson Long
- Spencer Long
- J. P. Losman
- Star Lotulelei
- Corey Louchiey
- Kamil Loud
- Tom Louderback
- Angelo Loukas
- Mike Love
- Warren Loving
- Richie Lucas
- Joey Lumpkin
- Chase Lundt
- Booth Lusteg
- Jeff Lyman
- Marshawn Lynch
- Tom Lynch

== M ==
- Greg Mabin
- Corey Mace
- Mark Maddox
- Paul Maguire
- Steve Maidlow
- Billy Majors
- Ryan Manalac
- Greg Mancz
- Dan Manucci
- EJ Manuel
- Gary Marangi
- Frank Marchlewski
- Dean Marlowe
- Vince Marrow
- David Martin (born 1959)
- David Martin (born 1979)
- Manny Martin
- Ruvell Martin
- Sam Martin
- Eugene Marve
- Tim Massaquoi
- Billy Masters
- Tyler Matakevich
- Phidarian Mathis
- Bruce Mathison
- John Matlock
- Archie Matsos
- Jordan Matthews
- Shane Matthews
- Marv Matuszak
- Aaron Maybin
- Dave Mays
- Mike McBath
- Dick McCabe
- Mike McCaffrey
- John McCargo
- Randy McClanahan
- Ray-Ray McCloud
- Brian McClure
- Brian McConnell
- LeSean McCoy
- Lerentee McCray
- John McCrumbly
- Lawrence McCutcheon
- Jeremy McDaniel
- Conor McDermott
- Gary McDermott
- Ron McDole
- Don McDonald
- Brady McDonnell
- Thad McFadden
- Dylan McFarland
- Jim McFarland
- Willis McGahee
- Terrence McGee
- Connor McGovern
- Joe McGrail
- Dan McGrew
- Corey McIntyre
- Keith McKeller
- Leodis McKelvin
- Isaiah McKenzie
- Keith McKenzie
- Reggie McKenzie
- Bill McKinley
- Royce McKinney
- Seth McKinney
- Ted McKnight
- Eddie McMillan
- Chuck McMurtry
- Sean McNanie
- Dave Means
- Jonathan Meeks
- Mike Mercer
- Dudley Meredith
- Jamon Meredith
- Mark Merrill
- Shawne Merriman
- Aaron Merz
- Bruce Mesner
- Pete Metzelaars
- Eddie Meyer
- Nick Mike-Mayer
- Matt Milano
- Bill Miller
- John Miller
- Mark Miller
- Terry Miller
- Von Miller
- Lawyer Milloy
- Jordan Mills
- Pete Mills
- Tom Minter
- John Mistler
- Charley Mitchell
- Kawika Mitchell
- Roland Mitchell
- Arthur Moats
- Tony Moeaki
- Chris Mohr
- Matt Monger
- Mike Montler
- Keith Moody
- Booker Moore
- Corey Moore
- Dave Moore
- Denarius Moore
- Elijah Moore
- Kyle Moore
- Leroy Moore
- Ricky Moore
- Brian Moorman
- Sean Moran
- Quintin Morris
- Sammy Morris
- Kirk Morrison
- Nicholas Morrow
- Mitch Morse
- Greg Morton
- Haven Moses
- Mike Mosley
- Wayne Mosley
- Roland Moss
- Zack Moss
- Eric Moulds
- Chuck Muelhaupt
- Jamie Mueller
- Matthew Mulligan
- Bill Munson
- Jesse Murdock
- Marcus Murphy
- Matt Murphy
- Trent Murphy
- Justin Murray
- Latavius Murray
- Tom Myslinski

== N ==
- Jamie Nails
- Siran Neal
- Speedy Neal
- Ryan Neill
- Bob Nelson
- Chuck Nelson
- David Nelson
- Shane Nelson
- Shawn Nelson
- Ryan Neufeld
- Marshall Newhouse
- Keith Newman
- John Nies
- Nick Nighswander
- Jeff Nixon
- Josh Norman
- Ulysses Norris
- Gabe Northern
- Scott Norwood
- Ty Nsekhe
- Julian Nunamaker
- Tom Nütten
- Chip Nuzzo

== O ==
- Efe Obada
- Tommy O'Connell
- Nate Odomes
- Joe O'Donnell
- Neil O'Donoghue
- Kendrick Office
- Dave Ogas
- Larry Ogunjobi
- Steve Okoniewski
- Michael Ola
- Chris Oldham
- Dan O'Leary
- Nick O'Leary
- Ed Oliver
- Frank Oliver
- Harold Olson
- Xavier Omon
- Nate Orchard
- Kyle Orton
- Jerry Ostroski
- Artie Owens
- Terrell Owens

== P ==
- Ashlee Palmer
- Dick Palmer
- Josh Palmer
- Sam Palumbo
- Mike Panepinto
- Joe Panos
- Ervin Parker
- Glenn Parker
- Kerry Parker
- Willie Parker
- John Parrella
- Lemar Parrish
- Roscoe Parrish
- Rick Partridge
- Lloyd Pate
- Herb Paterra
- Wayne Patrick
- Bob Patton
- James Patton
- Jerry Patton
- Marvcus Patton
- Walt Patulski
- Bryce Paup
- Erik Pears
- Kyle Peko
- Bob Penchion
- Terrance Pennington
- Marlo Perry
- Senorise Perry
- Jim Perryman
- Nathan Peterman
- Jason Peters
- Bob Petrich
- Tommy Pharr
- Ed Philion
- Cam Phillips
- Del'Shawn Phillips
- Harrison Phillips
- Jordan Phillips
- Kim Phillips
- Lou Piccone
- Mark Pike
- John Pitts
- Lafayette Pitts
- Ron Pitts
- Bobby Ply
- DaShon Polk
- David Pool
- Daryl Porter
- Kerry Porter
- Ricky Porter
- Jeff Posey
- Paul Posluszny
- John Potter
- Steve Potter
- Art Powell
- Darnell Powell
- Eric Powell
- Shawn Powell
- Steve Powell
- Ty Powell
- Walt Powell
- Jordan Poyer
- Dean Prater
- Matt Prater
- Duke Preston
- Marcus Price
- Peerless Price
- Shawn Price
- Pierson Prioleau
- Remi Prudhomme
- Mike Pruitt
- Terrelle Pryor
- Mike Pucillo

== Q ==
- David Quessenberry

== R ==
- Warren Rabb
- Scott Radecic
- Bacarri Rambo
- Andre Ramsey
- Eason Ramson
- Al Randolph
- Taylor Rapp
- Ahmad Rashad
- Eddie Ray
- Dave Rayner
- Kevin Reddick
- Andre Reed
- Josh Reed
- Izell Reese
- Jerry Reese
- Roy Reeves
- Frank Reich
- Andy Reid
- Jim Reilly
- Dennis Remmert
- Tutan Reyes
- M.C. Reynolds
- Xavier Rhodes
- Benny Ricardo
- Denzel Rice
- Ken Rice
- Perry Richards
- Cyril Richardson
- Eric Richardson
- Pete Richardson
- Mike Richey
- Robb Riddick
- Elston Ridgle
- Preston Ridlehuber
- Jay Riemersma
- Chad Rinehart
- Ray Rissmiller
- Jim Ritcher
- Hank Rivera
- Keith Rivers
- Brad Robbins
- Bo Roberson
- Marcus Roberson
- Andre Roberts
- Isiah Robertson
- Tyrone Robertson
- Nickell Robey
- Eddie Robinson
- Matt Robinson
- Evan Rodriguez
- Charlie Rogers
- Justin Rogers (cornerback)
- Reggie Rogers
- Sam Rogers
- Butch Rolle
- Charles Romes
- Mark Roopenian
- Naaman Roosevelt
- Durwood Roquemore
- Hatch Rosdahl
- Erik Rosenmeier
- Jay Ross
- Louis Ross
- Willie Ross
- Gregory Rousseau
- Robert Royal
- Benny Russell
- Charlie Rutkowski
- Ed Rutkowski
- Tom Ruud
- Tom Rychlec

== S ==
- Rodger Saffold
- Tom Saidock
- George Saimes
- Greg Salas
- Curtis Samuel
- Garrison Sanborn
- Emmanuel Sanders
- T. J. Sanders
- Lucius Sanford
- Lauvale Sape
- John Saunders
- Darnell Savage Jr.
- Joe Schaffer
- Scott Schankweiler
- Todd Schlopy
- Bob Schmidt
- Colton Schmidt
- Henry Schmidt
- Steven Schnarr
- Mike Schneck
- Aaron Schobel
- Marty Schottenheimer
- Derek Schouman
- Rick Schulte
- Kurt Schulz
- Josh Scobey
- Bryan Scott
- Da'Mari Scott
- Jack Scott
- Jonathan Scott
- Leon Seals
- Sammy Seamster
- Da'Norris Searcy
- Robert Sedlock
- Andy Selfridge
- Tom Sestak
- Tim Settle
- Kevon Seymour
- Paul Seymour
- Khalil Shakir
- Tyrell Shavers
- Billy Shaw
- Bobby Shaw
- Dennis Shaw
- Daimon Shelton
- Johnny Shepherd
- Kelvin Sheppard
- Trent Sherfield
- Tom Sherman
- Joe Shipp
- Bill Shockley
- Mark Shupe
- Dainon Sidney
- Joe Silipo
- Mana Silva
- Kendall Simmons
- Wayne Simmons
- Ken Simonton
- Bill Simpson
- Ko Simpson
- O. J. Simpson
- Devin Singletary
- Jeremiah Sirles
- John Skorupan
- Eric Smedley
- Fred Smerlas
- Allen Smith
- Andre Smith
- Antowain Smith
- Bobby Smith
- Brad Smith
- Brandon Smith
- Bruce Smith
- Carl Smith
- Don Smith (born 1957)
- Don Smith (born 1963)
- Jonathan Smith
- Lawrence Smith
- Lee Smith
- Leonard Smith
- Lucious Smith
- Marty Smith
- Thomas Smith
- Tody Smith
- Dawuane Smoot
- David Snow
- Cal Snowden
- Ben Sobieski
- Javon Solomon
- Roland Solomon
- Don Sommer
- Jim Sorey
- Quinton Spain
- Baylon Spector
- Chris Spielman
- Brandon Spikes
- Jack Spikes
- Takeo Spikes
- C. J. Spiller
- Brandon Spoon
- Marcus Spriggs
- Josh Stamer
- Julian Stanford
- Joe Staysniak
- Anthony Steels
- Fred Steinfort
- Kay Stephenson
- Matt Stevens
- Dominique Stevenson
- Marquez Stevenson
- Tony Steward
- Art Still
- Donnie Stone
- Ken Stone
- Mike Stratton
- Dorian Strong
- Marcus Stroud
- Jonathan Stupar
- Marques Sullivan
- Frank Summers
- Mickey Sutton
- Tommy Sweeney
- Marvin Switzer
- Eugene Sykes

== T ==
- Mike Taliaferro
- Darryl Talley
- A. J. Tarpley
- Carl Taseff
- Steve Tasker
- Bob Tatarek
- Brandon Tate
- Brian Taylor
- Tyrod Taylor
- Vincent Taylor
- Trey Teague
- Jimmy Teal
- Wyatt Teller
- Richard Tharp
- Marcus Thigpen
- Tyler Thigpen
- Anthony Thomas
- Damon Thomas
- Ike Thomas
- Josh Thomas
- Kevin Thomas
- Kiwaukee Thomas
- Logan Thomas
- Robert Thomas
- Shamarko Thomas
- Thurman Thomas
- Corey Thompson
- Deonte Thompson
- Gary Thompson
- Shaq Thompson
- Bubba Thornton
- Cedric Thornton
- Travares Tillman
- Tim Tindale
- Mike Tolbert
- Marco Tongue
- Casey Toohill
- Pat Toomay
- Reggie Torbor
- LaVerne Torczon
- O'Cyrus Torrence
- Willie Totten
- John Tracey
- Rod Trafford
- Richard Trapp
- Mark Traynowicz
- Larry Tripplett
- Torell Troup
- Mitch Trubisky
- Erroll Tucker
- Ross Tucker
- Jeff Tuel
- Maugaula Tuitele
- Nate Turner
- Vernon Turner
- Rick Tuten
- Perry Tuttle
- Maurice Tyler

== U ==
- Edefuan Ulofoshio
- J. J. Unga
- Morris Unutoa
- Kraig Urbik

== V ==
- Marquez Valdes-Scantling
- Vern Valdez
- Tanner Vallejo
- Ryan Van Demark
- Alex Van Pelt
- Sedrick Van Pran-Granger
- Greg Van Roten
- Pete Van Valkenberg
- Kendal Vickers
- Phil Villapiano
- Chris Villarrial
- Troy Vincent
- Jalen Virgil
- Scott Virkus
- Tim Vogler

== W ==
- Jim Wagstaff
- Mark Walczak
- Deone Walker
- Donnie Walker
- Langston Walker
- Levi Wallace
- Craig Walls
- Chris Walsh
- Len Walterscheid
- Larry Walton
- Ed Wang
- Ernie Warlick
- Charley Warner
- Kahale Warring
- Adolphus Washington
- Dave Washington
- Mickey Washington
- Ted Washington
- Vic Washington
- Larry Watkins
- Sammy Watkins
- Chris Watson
- Scott Watters
- Davis Webb
- Joe Webb
- Jason Webster
- Ted Wegert
- Thomas Welch
- John Wendling
- Al Wenglikowski
- Willie West
- Jamaal Westerman
- Manch Wheeler
- Chris White
- Corey White
- Craig White
- David White
- Jan White
- Johnny White
- Mike White
- Sherman White
- Tre'Davious White
- Donte Whitner
- Arthur Whittington
- Jason Whittle
- Marcellus Wiley
- Gary Wilkins
- Aaron Williams
- Antonio Williams
- Ben Williams
- Chris Williams (born 1959)
- Chris Williams (born 1985)
- Clarence Williams
- Daryl Williams
- Dorian Williams
- Duke Williams (born 1990)
- Duke Williams (born 1993)
- James Williams
- Jonathan Williams
- Karlos Williams
- Keith Williams
- Kevin Williams (born 1961)
- Kevin Williams (born 1971)
- Kyle Williams
- Leonard Williams
- Mario Williams
- Mike Williams (born 1980)
- Mike Williams (born 1987)
- Pat Williams
- Shaud Williams
- Thomas Williams
- Van Williams
- Keith Willis
- Leonard Willis
- Don Wilson
- Eric Wilson
- George Wilson
- Karl Wilson
- Mike Wilson
- Jeff Winans
- Antoine Winfield Sr.
- Ronnie Wingo
- Brian Winters
- Coy Wire
- Mitch Wishnowsky
- Billy Witt
- Wayne Wolff
- Will Wolford
- Cierre Wood
- Eric Wood
- Pierre Woods
- Robert Woods
- Roscoe Word
- Daryl Worley
- Jerel Worthy
- Dwayne Wright
- Jeff Wright
- Kenyatta Wright
- Shareece Wright
- Mansfield Wrotto
- Alvin Wyatt
- Jarius Wynn

== Y ==
- John Yaccino
- Eddie Yarbrough
- Jeff Yeates
- T. J. Yeldon
- Mack Yoho
- Ashton Youboty
- Duane Young
- Sam Young
- Willie Young
- Sid Youngelman

== Z ==
- Rich Zecher
- Dusty Zeigler
- Connie Zelencik
- Justin Zimmer
