= 1979 Buffalo Bills season =

20th season in franchise history

- Owner: Ralph Wilson
- Head coach: Chuck Knox
- Home stadium: Rich Stadium

Results
- Record: 7–9
- Division place: 4th AFC East
- Playoffs: Did not qualify
- All-Pros: G Joe DeLamielleure (1st team)
- Pro Bowlers: G Joe DeLamielleure

The 1979 Buffalo Bills season was the franchise's 10th season in the National Football League, and 20th overall.

Head coach Chuck Knox spent his second season with the Bills in 1979, improving on 1978's record by two games. The Bills were 7–6 with three games left to play, but they lost their final three games to finish with a losing record. (Even if Buffalo had won their final three games, they still would have lost the head-to-head tiebreaker to the Miami Dolphins (who finished 10–6) for the division title.)

Buffalo's loss to Miami in Week Seven was their 20th straight loss to the Dolphins, an NFL record.

The 1979 Bills were last in rushing yards in the NFL, with only total 1,621 yards on the ground. Buffalo's 268 points scored was 23rd of the league's 28 teams.

== Offseason ==
=== NFL draft ===
Three of Buffalo's first four picks made at least one Pro Bowl: wide receiver Jerry Butler, nose tackle Fred Smerlas, and linebacker Jim Haslett. Haslett was named 1979 AP Rookie of the Year. Smerlas made five Pro Bowls in 1980, 1981, 1982, 1983 and 1988.

Defensive end Ken Johnson, center Jon Borchardt, and defensive backs Jeff Nixon and Rod Kush all played for the Bills for six years from 1979 to 1984.

1979 Buffalo Bills draft
Round	Pick	Player	Position	College	Notes
1	1	Tom Cousineau	Linebacker	Ohio State	
1	5	Jerry Butler *	Wide receiver	Clemson	
2	32	Fred Smerlas *	Defensive tackle	Boston College	
2	51	Jim Haslett *	Linebacker	Indiana (PA)	
3	62	Jon Borchardt	Guard	Montana State	
4	83	Ken Johnson	Defensive end	Knoxville	
4	87	Jeff Nixon	Safety	Richmond	
5	114	Rod Kush	Safety	Nebraska-Omaha	
5	116	Dan Manucci	Quarterback	Kansas State	
6	141	Mike Burrow	Guard	Auburn	
7	170	Tom Mullady	Tight end	Rhodes	
9	226	Kevin Baker	Defensive end	William Penn	
10	253	Dave Marler	Quarterback	Mississippi State	
11	279	Paul Lawler	Defensive back	Colgate	
12	308	Mike Harris	Running back	Arizona State	
Made roster * Made at least one Pro Bowl during career

==== Tom Cousineau ====
Ohio State linebacker Cousineau was drafted first overall in the 1979 NFL Draft by the Bills, who acquired the pick from San Francisco in a trade for O. J. Simpson. Cousineau never played a game with the Bills. He instead signed with the Canadian Football League's Montreal Alouettes where they offered double the money that the Bills originally offered. Cousineau became a star there, becoming the Grey Cup Most Valuable Player in the 1979 season. Cousineau wanted to return to the NFL, and in 1982 the Houston Oilers attempted to sign him, but the Bills (who still held Cousineau's NFL rights) matched the offer. He was then traded from the Bills to the Cleveland Browns for a first-round draft choice (14th overall) in the 1983 NFL draft, which would be used on future Hall of Fame quarterback Jim Kelly. Cousineau signed a five-year contract for 2.5 million dollars, the most ever for a Cleveland Brown player at the time.[5]

=== Undrafted free agents ===
1979 undrafted free agents of note
Player	Position	College
Orlando Alvarez	Wide receiver	Montclair State
Rod Broadway	Defensive Tackle	North Carolina
Derrick Burnett	Running back	Indiana
Robert Cameron	Punter	Acadia
Jerome Carter	Cornerback	Delaware State
Donald Clayton	Punter	Wyoming
Bill Crowley	Linebacker	Yale
Leroy McGee	Running back	Michigan State
Russell Pope	Cornerback	Purdue
Ronald Ricks	Cornerback	Kansas

== Personnel ==
=== Staff/coaches ===
1979 Buffalo Bills staff
Front office
- Majority owner/team president – Ralph Wilson
- Vice-president & general manager – Bob Lustig
- Vice-president/minority owner – Pat McGroder

Coaching staff

- Head coach – Chuck Knox

Offensive coaches

- Offensive coordinator / offensive line – Ray Proschaska
- Quarterbacks coach - Kay Stephenson
- Wide receivers coach – Jack Donaldson

Defensive/special teams coaches

- Defensive coordinator / linebackers coach - Tom Caitlin
- Defensive line – Willie Zapalac
- Defensive backs – Jim Wagstaff
- Special teams – Steve Moore

=== Roster ===
1979 Buffalo Bills roster
Quarterbacks (QB): 12 Joe Ferguson; 11 Dan Manucci; 9 Bill Munson; Running backs (RB): 47 Curtis Brown; 35 Mike Collier; 25 Roland Hooks; 40 Terry Miller; 23 Steve Powell; Wide receivers (WR): 80 Jerry Butler; 84 Danny Fulton; 82 Frank Lewis; 89 Lou Piccone; 86 Leonard Willis; Tight ends (TE): 85 Ron Howard; 87 Joe Shipp	Offensive linemen (OL): 73 Jon Borchardt T; 68 Joe DeLamielleure G; 70 Joe Devlin T; 53 Will Grant C; 72 Ken Jones T; 67 Reggie McKenzie G; 61 Willie Parker C; 65 Tim Vogler G; Defensive linemen (DL): 74 Dee Hardison DE; 90 Scott Hutchinson DE; 91 Ken Johnson NT; 71 Mike Kadish NT; 83 Sherman White DE; 77 Ben Williams DE	Linebackers (LB): 55 Jim Haslett ILB; 54 Tom Higgins ILB; 51 Dan Jilek OLB; 52 Chris Keating ILB; 59 Shane Nelson ILB; 58 Isiah Robertson OLB; 57 Lucius Sanford OLB; Defensive backs (DB): 29 Mario Clark CB; 22 Steve Freeman SS; 21 Doug Greene SS; 47 Tony Greene FS; 46 Keith Moody CB; 38 Jeff Nixon FS; 26 Charles Romes CB; Special teams (ST): 4 Rusty Jackson P; 5 Nick Mike-Mayer K	Reserve: -- Kevin Baker DE (IR); -- Aaron Ball LB (IR); 81 Bob Chandler WR (IR); -- Phil Dokes DE (IR); 65 Ed Fulton G (IR); 88 Reuben Gant TE (IR); -- Mekeli Ieremia DE (IR); 39 Dennis Johnson RB (IR); 42 Rod Kush S (IR); 76 Fred Smerlas NT (IR); -- Connie Zelencik C (IR); Rookies in italics

== Regular season ==
=== Schedule ===
Week	Date	Opponent	Result	Record	Venue	Attendance
1	September 2	**Miami Dolphins**	**L** 7–9	0–1	Rich Stadium	69,441
2	September 9	Cincinnati Bengals	**W** 51–24	1–1	Rich Stadium	43,504
3	September 16	at San Diego Chargers	**L** 19–27	1–2	San Diego Stadium	50,709
4	September 23	**New York Jets**	**W** 46–31	2–2	Rich Stadium	68,731
5	September 30	at **Baltimore Colts**	**W** 31–13	3–2	Memorial Stadium	31,904
6	October 7	Chicago Bears	**L** 0–7	3–3	Rich Stadium	73,383
7	October 14	at **Miami Dolphins**	**L** 7–17	3–4	Miami Orange Bowl	45,597
8	October 21	**Baltimore Colts**	**L** 13–14	3–5	Rich Stadium	50,581
9	October 28	at Detroit Lions	**W** 20–17	4–5	Pontiac Silverdome	61,911
10	November 4	**New England Patriots**	**L** 6–26	4–6	Rich Stadium	67,935
11	November 11	at **New York Jets**	**W** 14–12	5–6	Shea Stadium	50,647
12	November 18	Green Bay Packers	**W** 19–12	6–6	Rich Stadium	39,679
13	November 25	at **New England Patriots**	**W** 16–13 (OT)	7–6	Schaefer Stadium	60,991
14	December 2	Denver Broncos	**L** 16–19	7—7	Rich Stadium	37,886
15	December 9	at Minnesota Vikings	**L** 3–10	7–8	Metropolitan Stadium	42,239
16	December 16	at Pittsburgh Steelers	**L** 0–28	7–9	Three Rivers Stadium	48,002
Note: Intra-division opponents are in **bold** text.

=== Standings ===
AFC East
	W	L	T	PCT	DIV	CONF	PF	PA	STK
^{(3)} Miami Dolphins	10	6	0	.625	5–3	6–6	341	257	L1
New England Patriots	9	7	0	.563	4–4	6–6	411	326	W1
New York Jets	8	8	0	.500	4–4	5–7	337	383	W3
Buffalo Bills	7	9	0	.438	4–4	5–7	268	279	L3
Baltimore Colts	5	11	0	.313	3–5	4–10	271	351	W1

== Season summary ==
=== Week 11 ===
Team	1	2	3	4	Total
• Bills	0	7	0	7	14
Jets	0	6	0	6	12

- Date: November 11
- Location: Shea Stadium New York
- Game start: 1:00 PM EST
- Game attendance: 50,647
- Game weather: 52 degrees, relative humidity 78%, wind 10 mph
- Referee: Pat Haggerty
- TV announcers (NBC): Marv Albert and Mike Haffner

=== Week 12 ===
Team	1	2	3	4	Total
Packers	3	9	0	0	12
• Bills	3	3	6	7	19

- Date: November 18
- Location: Rich Stadium Buffalo
- Game start: 1:00 PM EST
- Game attendance: 39,679
- Game weather: 44 degrees, relative humidity 88%, wind 10 mph
- Referee: Jim Tunney
- TV announcers (CBS): Tim Ryan and Roman Gabriel

=== Week 13 at Patriots ===
Week Thirteen: Buffalo Bills (6–6) at New England Patriots (8–4)

Quarter	1	2	3	4	OT	Total
Bills	0	3	3	7	3	16
Patriots	0	3	0	10	0	13

at Schaefer Stadium, Foxborough, Massachusetts

- Date: November 25
- Game time: 1:00 p.m. EST
- Game weather: 63 °F or 17.2 °C
- Game attendance: 60,991
- Box Score

Game information

First quarter

- No scoring

Second quarter

- NE – John Smith 47-yard field goal. Patriots 3–0.
- BUF – Nick Mike-Mayer 29-yard field goal. Tie 3–3.

Third quarter

- BUF – Nick Mike-Mayer 26-yard field goal. Bills 6–3.

Fourth quarter

- NE – Steve Grogan 1-yard run (John Smith kick). Patriots 10–6.
- NE – John Smith 32-yard field goal. Patriots 13–6.
- BUF – Lou Piccone 11-yard pass from Joe Ferguson (Nick Mike-Mayer kick). Tie 13–13.

Overtime

- BUF – Nick Mike-Mayer 29-yard field goal. Bills 16–13.

Top passers

- BUF – Joe Ferguson – 17/33, 235 yards, TD, 2 INT
- NE – Steve Grogan – 9/25, 160 yards, 4 INT

Top rushers

- BUF – Curtis Brown – 15 rushes, 42 yards
- NE – Horace Ivory – 23 rushes, 83 yards
  Don Calhoun – 20 rushes, 83 yards

Top receivers

- BUF – Jerry Butler – 4 receptions, 95 yards
- NE – Harold Jackson – 4 receptions, 87 yards
