= 1978 Buffalo Bills season =

19th season in franchise history

- Owner: Ralph Wilson
- Head coach: Chuck Knox
- Home stadium: Rich Stadium

Results
- Record: 5–11
- Division place: 4th AFC East
- Playoffs: Did not qualify
- All-Pros: G Joe DeLamielleure (2nd team)
- Pro Bowlers: G Joe DeLamielleure

The 1978 Buffalo Bills season was the franchise's 9th season in the National Football League, and the 19th overall. The Bills were coming off a season in which they only won three games, making 1978 a slight improvement.

Head coach Chuck Knox began his first season with the team, having coached the Los Angeles Rams for the previous five seasons. (Note: Knox would coach the Bills for five seasons – through the 1982 season – before leaving for Seattle.) It was also Buffalo's first season after the departure of star running back O. J. Simpson, who was traded to San Francisco for five draft picks in the offseason.

The Bills offense acquired a pair of weapons for quarterback Joe Ferguson: wide receiver Frank Lewis, who had spent the previous 7 seasons in Pittsburgh, and rookie running back Terry Miller, who ended the season with over 1,000 yards. (Note: Miller's 1,060 yards would be the only 1,000-yard total of his three year career in Buffalo.)

The 1978 Bills' run defense allowed an NFL record 3,228 rushing yards; the 677 rushing attempts the Bills faced in 1978 is also an NFL record. Oddly, the Bills were first in the league in yards allowed on pass defense, giving up only 1,960 yards through the air.

Buffalo's week eight victory over the Cincinnati Bengals produced the second 5–0 final score in modern NFL history (since 1933); the other was a 1970 NFC divisional playoff between the Dallas Cowboys and Detroit Lions.

== Offseason ==
=== Draft ===
1978 Buffalo Bills draft
Round	Pick	Player	Position	College	Notes
1	5	Terry Miller	Running back	Oklahoma State	
2	32	Dee Hardison	Defensive end	North Carolina	
2	38	Scott Hutchinson	Defensive end	Florida	
3	59	Dennis Johnson	Running back	Mississippi State	
3	65	Danny Fulton	Wide receiver	Nebraska–Omaha	
4	89	Lucius Sanford	Linebacker	Georgia Tech	
5	114	Ken Spaeth	Tight end	Nebraska	
6	145	Eric Smith	Offensive tackle	Southern Miss	
7	171	Mario Celotto	Linebacker	USC	
7	183	Steve Powell	Running back	NE Missouri State	
10	255	Will Grant	Center	Kentucky	
11	282	Jerry Blanton	Linebacker	Kentucky	
12	309	Richard Crump	Running back	Northeast Oklahoma A&M	
Made roster † Pro Football Hall of Fame * Made at least one Pro Bowl during career

=== Undrafted free agents ===
1978 undrafted free agents of note
Player	Position	College
Joe Shipp	Tight end	USC

== Personnel ==
=== Staff/coaches ===
1978 Buffalo Bills staff
Front office
- Majority owner/team president – Ralph Wilson
- Vice-president & general manager – Bob Lustig
- Vice-president/minority owner – Pat McGroder

Coaching staff

- Head coach – Chuck Knox

Offensive coaches

- Offensive coordinator / offensive line – Ray Proschaska
- Running backs coach – Elijah Pitts
- Wide receivers coach – Jack Donaldson

Defensive/special teams coaches

- Defensive coordinator / linebackers coach - Tom Caitlin
- Defensive line – Willie Zapalac
- Defensive backs – Jim Wagstaff
- Special teams – Steve Moore & Elijah Pitts

=== Roster ===
1978 Buffalo Bills roster
Quarterbacks (QB): 12 Joe Ferguson; 10 Dave Mays; 9 Bill Munson; Running backs (RB): 47 Curtis Brown; 25 Roland Hooks; 39 Dennis Johnson; 40 Terry Miller; 23 Steve Powell; Wide receivers (WR): 81 Bob Chandler; 82 Frank Lewis; 89 Lou Piccone; 49 Larry Walton; Tight ends (TE): 84 Mike Franckowiak; 88 Reuben Gant	Offensive linemen (OL): 60 Bill Adams G; 68 Joe DeLamielleure G; 79 Elbert Drungo T; 53 Will Grant C; 76 Craig Hertwig T; 72 Ken Jones T; 67 Reggie McKenzie G; 61 Willie Parker C; Defensive linemen (DL): 74 Dee Hardison DT; 78 Scott Hutchinson DE; 73 Mekeli Ieremia DE; 75 Dennis Johnson DT; 71 Mike Kadish DT; 83 Sherman White DE; 77 Ben Williams DE	Linebackers (LB): 52 Doug Becker OLB; 55 Tom Graham MLB; 51 Dan Jilek OLB; 54 Randy McClanahan MLB; 59 Shane Nelson OLB; 57 Lucius Sanford OLB; Defensive backs (DB): 29 Mario Clark CB; 22 Steve Freeman SS; 43 Tony Greene FS; 24 Doug Jones SS; 41 Eddie McMillan CB; 46 Keith Moody CB; 26 Charles Romes CB; 21 Marvin Switzer FS; Special teams (ST): 6 Tom Dempsey K; 4 Rusty Jackson P	Reserve: 58 Mario Celotto LB (IR); 35 Mike Collier RB (IR); 70 Joe Devlin T (IR); 85 Phil Dokes DT (IR); 56 Tom Ehlers LB (IR); -- Danny Fulton WR (IR); 80 John Holland WR (IR); -- Phil Olsen C (IR); 87 Joe Shipp TE (IR); -- Eric Smith T (IR); 86 Leonard Willis WR (IR); -- Willie Zackery WR (IR); -- Connie Zelencik C (IR); Rookies in italics

== Regular season ==
=== Schedule ===
Week	Date	Opponent	Result	Record	Venue	Attendance
1	September 3	Pittsburgh Steelers	**L** 17–28	0–1	Rich Stadium	64,147
2	September 10	**New York Jets**	**L** 20–21	0–2	Rich Stadium	40,985
3	September 17	at **Miami Dolphins**	**L** 24–31	0–3	Miami Orange Bowl	48,373
4	September 24	**Baltimore Colts**	**W** 24–17	1–3	Rich Stadium	55,270
5	October 1	Kansas City Chiefs	**W** 28–13	2–3	Rich Stadium	47,310
6	October 8	at **New York Jets**	**L** 14–45	2–4	Shea Stadium	44,545
7	October 15	at Houston Oilers	**L** 10–17	2–5	Astrodome	47,727
8	October 22	Cincinnati Bengals	**W** 5–0	3–5	Rich Stadium	47,754
9	October 29	at Cleveland Browns	**L** 20–41	3–6	Cleveland Municipal Stadium	51,409
10	November 5	**New England Patriots**	**L** 10–14	3–7	Rich Stadium	44,897
11	November 12	**Miami Dolphins**	**L** 24–25	3–8	Rich Stadium	48,623
12	November 19	at Tampa Bay Buccaneers	**L** 10–31	3–9	Tampa Stadium	61,383
13	November 26	New York Giants	**W** 41–17	4–9	Rich Stadium	28,496
14	December 3	at Kansas City Chiefs	**L** 10–14	4–10	Arrowhead Stadium	25,781
15	December 10	at **New England Patriots**	**L** 24–26	4–11	Schaefer Stadium	59,598
16	December 17	at **Baltimore Colts**	**W** 21–14	5–11	Memorial Stadium	25,415
Note: Intra-division opponents are in **bold** text.

=== Season summary ===
==== Week 1 ====
Team	1	2	3	4	Total
• Steelers	0	14	0	14	28
Bills	0	0	0	17	17

- Date: September 3, 1978
- Location: Rich Stadium • Orchard Park, NY
- Game start: 1:00 PM EST
- Game attendance: 64,147
- Game weather: 67 °F or 19.4 °C • 13 miles per hour (21 km/h; 11 kn)
- Referee: Fred Silva
- TV announcers (NBC): Jay Randolph and Mike Haffner

==== Week 4 ====
Team	1	2	3	4	Total
Colts	0	14	3	0	17
• Bills	14	10	0	0	24

- Date: September 24
- Location: Rich Stadium
- Game start: 1:00 p.m. EST
- Game weather: 56 °F or 13.3 °C; wind 11 miles per hour (18 km/h; 9.6 kn)
- Referee: Cal Lepore

Scoring summary
Q1	BUF	Gant 19 yard pass from Ferguson (Dempsey kick)	BUF 7–0
Q1	BUF	Lewis 28 yard pass from Ferguson (Dempsey kick)	BUF 14–0
Q2	BAL	Leaks 17 yard pass from Troup (Linhart kick)	BUF 14–7
Q2	BAL	McCall 5 yard blocked punt return (Linhart kick)	Tie 14–14
Q2	BUF	Brown 102 yard kickoff return (Dempsey kick)	BUF 21–14
Q2	BUF	Dempsey 21 yard field goal	BUF 24–14
Q3	BAL	Linhart 21 yard field goal	BUF 24–17

==== Week 5 ====
Week Five: Kansas City Chiefs at Buffalo Bills – Game summary

Quarter	1	2	3	4	Total
Chiefs	6	0	0	7	**13**
**Bills**	0	21	7	0	**28**

at Rich Stadium, Orchard Park, New York

- Date: October 1
- Game time: 1:00 p.m. EDT/12:00 p.m. CST
- Game weather: 60 °F (16 °C)
- Game attendance: 47,310
- Referee: Gordon McCarter
- TV: NBC
- Box score

Game information

**First quarter**

- KC – Jan Stenerud 42-yard field goal. Chiefs 3–0.
- KC – Jan Stenerud 27-yard field goal. Chiefs 6–0.

**Second quarter**

- BUF – Bob Chandler 20-yard pass from Joe Ferguson (Tom Dempsey kick). Bills 7–6.
- BUF – Terry Miller 8-yard run (Tom Dempsey kick). Bills 14–6.
- BUF – Bob Chandler 22-yard pass from Joe Ferguson (Tom Dempsey kick). Bills 21–6.

**Third quarter**

- BUF – Curtis Brown 22-yard run (Tom Dempsey kick). Bills 28–6.

**Fourth quarter**

- KC – Ted McKnight 41-yard run (Jan Stenerud kick). Bills 28–13.

Top passers

- KC – Tony Adams – 7/12, 80 yards
- BUF – Joe Ferguson – 15/18, 210 yards, 2 TD, INT

Top rushers

- KC – MacArthur Lane – 17 rushes, 144 yards
- BUF – Terry Miller – 18 rushes, 67 yards, TD

Top receivers

- KC – Walter White – 5 receptions, 60 yards
- BUF – Bob Chandler – 7 receptions, 116 yards, 2 TD

==== Week 10 ====
Team	1	2	3	4	Total
• Patriots	0	7	7	0	14
Bills	3	0	0	7	10

- Date: September 24
- Location: Rich Stadium
- Game start: 1:00 p.m. EST
- Game attendance: 44,897
- Game weather: 56 °F or 13.3 °C; wind 13 miles per hour (21 km/h; 11 kn)
- Referee: Chuck Heberling
- TV announcers (NBC): Sam Nover and Len Dawson

==== Week 13 vs. Giants ====
Week Thirteen: New York Giants (5–7) at Buffalo Bills (3–9)

Quarter	1	2	3	4	Total
Giants	7	3	7	0	**17**
**Bills**	7	0	7	27	**41**

at Rich Stadium, Orchard Park, New York

- Date: November 26, 1978
- Game time: 1:00 p.m. EDT
- Game weather: 23 °F (−5 °C)
- Game attendance: 28,496
- Referee: Red Cashion
- TV announcers (CBS): Pat Summerall and Tom Brookshier
- Box Score

Game information

**First quarter**

- NYG – Al Dixon 31-yard pass from Joe Pisarcik (Joe Danelo kick). Giants 7–0.
- BUF – Curtis Brown 1-yard run (Tom Dempsey kick). Tie 7–7.

**Second quarter**

- NYG – Joe Danelo 27-yard field goal. Giants 10–7.

**Third quarter**

- NYG – Doug Kotar 19-yard pass from Joe Pisarcik (Joe Danelo kick). Giants 17–7.
- BUF – Roland Hooks 1-yard run (Tom Dempsey kick). Giants 17–14.

**Fourth quarter**

- BUF – Curtis Brown 1-yard run (Tom Dempsey kick). Bills 21–17.
- BUF – Lou Piccone 9-yard pass from Joe Ferguson (Tom Dempsey kick). Bills 28–17.
- BUF – Terry Miller 39-yard run (Tom Dempsey kick). Bills 35–17.
- BUF – Terry Miller 13-yard run (kick failed). Bills 41–17.

Top passers

- NYG – Joe Pisarcik – 15/24, 230 yards, 2 TD, INT
- BUF – Joe Ferguson – 9/15, 106 yards, TD, INT

Top rushers

- NYG – Bobby Hammond – 15 rushes, 60 yards
- BUF – Terry Miller – 21 rushes, 208 yards, 2 TD

Top receivers

- NYG – Al Dixon – 2 receptions, 78 yards, TD
- BUF – Bob Chandler – 5 receptions, 75 yards

==== Week 14 at Chiefs ====
Week Fourteen: Buffalo Bills (4–9) at Kansas City Chiefs (4–9)

Quarter	1	2	3	4	Total
Bills	0	7	3	0	**10**
**Chiefs**	7	0	7	0	**14**

at Arrowhead Stadium, Kansas City, Missouri

- Date: December 3
- Game time: 1:00 p.m. CDT
- Game weather: 24 °F (−4 °C)
- Game attendance: 25,781
- Referee: Fred Silva
- TV announcers (NBC): Jay Randolph and Mike Haffner
- Box score

Game information

**First quarter**

- KC – Ted McKnight 17-yard run (Jan Stenerud kick). Chiefs 7–0.

**Second quarter**

- BUF – Frank Lewis 40-yard pass from Joe Ferguson (Tom Dempsey kick). Tied 7–7.

**Third quarter**

- BUF – Tom Dempsey 22-yard field goal. Bills 10–7.
- KC – Walter White 3-yard pass from Mike Livingston (Jan Stenerud kick). Chiefs 14–10.

**Fourth quarter**

- No scoring

Top passers

- BUF – Joe Ferguson – 14/25, 207 yards, TD, 3 INT
- KC – Mike Livingston – 12/21, 99 yards, TD, INT

Top rushers

- BUF – Terry Miller – 15 rushes, 57 yards
- KC – Tony Reed – 16 rushes, 97 yards

Top receivers

- BUF – Frank Lewis – 7 receptions, 126 yards, TD
- KC – Henry Marshall – 3 receptions, 40 yards

=== Standings ===
1978 AFC East standings
	W	L	T	PCT	DIV	CONF	PF	PA	STK
^{(2)} New England Patriots	11	5	0	.688	6–2	9–3	358	286	L1
^{(4)} Miami Dolphins	11	5	0	.688	5–3	8–4	372	254	W3
New York Jets	8	8	0	.500	6–2	7–5	359	364	L2
Buffalo Bills	5	11	0	.313	2–6	4–10	302	354	W1
Baltimore Colts	5	11	0	.313	1–7	3–9	239	421	L5

== Player stats ==
=== Passing ===
Note: Comp = Completions; ATT = Attempts; TD = Touchdowns; INT = Interceptions

Player	Games	Completions	Attempts	Yards	TD	INT	Rating
Joe Ferguson	16	175	330	2136	16	15	70.5

=== Special teams ===
Note: FGA = Field Goals Attempted; FGM = Field Goals Made; FG% = Field goal percentage; XPA = Extra Points Attempted; XPM = Extra Points Made; XP% = Extra Points Percentage

Player	Games	FGA	FGM	FG %	XPA	XPM	XP %
Tom Dempsey	16	13	10	76.9%	38	36	94.7%

== Video Archives ==
- 1978 NFL Week 1: Pittsburgh Steelers at Buffalo Bills at YouTube
- 1978 NFL Week 2: New York Jets at Buffalo Bills at YouTube
- 1978 NFL Week 5: Kansas City Chiefs at Buffalo Bills at YouTube
- 1978 NFL Week 6: Buffalo Bills at New York Jets at YouTube
