= 1976 All-South Independent football team =

American college football season

The 1976 All-South Independent football team consists of American football players chosen by the Associated Press for their All-South independent teams for the 1976 NCAA Division I football season.

== Offense ==
Quarterback

- Lloyd Patterson, Memphis (AP-1)

Running backs

- Ben Garry, Southern Mississippi (AP-1)
- Roscoe Coles, Virginia Tech (AP-1)

Wide receivers

- John Floyd, Louisiana-Monroe (AP-1)
- Philip Logan, South Carolina (AP-1)

Tight end

- Ed Beckman, Florida State (AP-1)

Tackles

- Eric Smith, Southern Mississippi (AP-1)
- Jon Thames, Florida State (AP-1)

Guards

- Bob Rush, Memphis (AP-1)
- Steve Courson, South Carolina (AP-1)

Center

- Leo Tierney, Georgia Tech (AP-1)

== Defense ==
Defensive ends

- Reggie Wilkes, Georgia Tech (AP-1)
- Bobby Smithhart, Southern Mississippi (AP-1)

Defensive tackles

- Eddie Edwards, Miami (AP-1)
- Tom Beasley, Virginia Tech (AP-1)
- Bubba Shugart, South Carolina (AP-1)

Linebackers

- Orlandus Branch, Richmond (AP-1)
- Rick Razzano, Virginia Tech (AP-1)
- Lucious Sanford, Georgia Tech (AP-1)

Defensive backs

- Jeff Nixon, Richmond (AP-1)
- Eric Harris, Memphis (AP-1)
- Martin Mitchell, Tulane (AP-1)

== Special teams ==
Kicker

- Ed Murray, Tulane (AP-1)

Punter

- Bruce Allen, Richmond (AP-1)
