= Charles Rutkowski =

American football player (1938–2013)

No. 75
- Position: Defensive end

Personal information
- Born: January 17, 1938; Racine, Wisconsin
- Died: July 19, 2013 (aged 75); Middleton, Wisconsin
- Listed height: 6 ft 3 in (1.91 m)
- Listed weight: 248 lb (112 kg)

Career information
- High school: St. Catherine's High School (Racine, Wisconsin)
- College: Ripon

Career history
- Buffalo Bills (1960); New England Patriots (1961)
- Stats at Pro Football Reference

Charles Robert Rutkowski (January 17, 1938 – July 19, 2013) was a player in the American Football League for the Buffalo Bills in 1960 and the 1961 Boston (now New England) Patriots as a defensive end. He played at the collegiate level at Ripon College.

== Biography ==
Rutkowski was born on January 17, 1938, in Racine, Wisconsin. He died July 19, 2013, in Middleton, Wisconsin. Rutkowski taught school and coached football and wrestling at Round Lake, Ill.. and coached football and boys track at McHenry, Ill., before coaching football and girls track for 32 years at Valders High School. The girls track team won 13 Olympian Conference Championships under Rutkowski. Players affectionately called him "Coach R."

== See also ==
- List of Buffalo Bills players
