= Martin Mitchell (gridiron football) =

American football player (born 1954)

No. 48, 29
- Position: Cornerback

Personal information
- Born: January 10, 1954 (age 72); Lake Charles, Louisiana, U.S.
- Listed height: 6 ft 1 in (1.85 m)
- Listed weight: 180 lb (82 kg)

Career information
- High school: Marion (Marion, Louisiana)
- College: Tulane
- NFL draft: 1977: 6th round, 158th overall pick

Career history
- Philadelphia Eagles (1977); Winnipeg Blue Bombers (1978–1979); Saskatchewan Roughriders (1980)*
- * Offseason or practice squad member only

Awards and highlights
- First-team All-South Independent (1976)
- Stats at Pro Football Reference

Martin Mitchell (born January 10, 1954) is an American former professional football cornerback who played for the Philadelphia Eagles of the National Football League (NFL). He played college football for the Tulane Green Wave and was selected by the Eagles in the sixth round of the 1977 NFL draft.

== Early life ==
Martin Mitchell was born on January 10, 1954, in Lake Charles, Louisiana. He attended Marion High School in Marion, Louisiana.

== College career ==
Mitchell enrolled at Tulane University to play college football for the Green Wave. He was a four-year letterman from 1973 to 1976 as a cornerback and return specialist. He dislocated his finger in November 1973. In 1974, Mitchell set single-season school records in return yards and total returns. He earned Associated Press first-team All-South Independent honors in 1976 as a defensive back.

== Professional career ==
Mitchell was selected by the Eagles in the sixth round, with the 158th overall pick, of the 1977 NFL draft as a cornerback. He played in all 14 games, mostly on special teams, for the Eagles during the 1977 season. In December 1977, The Daily Intelligencer said Mitchell had acquired a reputation as a feared hitter on special teams. He also recorded two punt returns for four yards, two fumbles, and one fumble recovery. He was released on August 23, 1978, after the fourth of five preseason games.

Mitchell later signed with the Winnipeg Blue Bombers of the Canadian Football League (CFL). Prior to the October 15, 1978, game against the Edmonton Eskimos, safety Brian Herosian was removed from the lineup due to injury. Defensive halfback Gary Rosolowich was then moved to safety and cornerback Merv Walker moved to halfback. Mitchell started the game at cornerback. He did not play in any more games that year. In April 1979, Mitchell signed with the Blue Bombers for the 1979 season. He started the regular season opener at cornerback on July 10. On July 13, he was released in favor of Brad Wagner.

Mitchell signed with the CFL's Saskatchewan Roughriders in April 1980. In late May 1980, Mitchell was released by the Roughriders after returning home for personal reasons.
