= Dennis Johnson (fullback) =

American football player (born 1956)

No. 39, 89
- Positions: Running back, tight end

Personal information
- Born: February 26, 1956 (age 70); Weir, Mississippi, U.S.
- Listed height: 6 ft 3 in (1.91 m)
- Listed weight: 220 lb (100 kg)

Career information
- College: Mississippi State
- NFL draft: 1978: 3rd round, 59th overall pick

Career history
- Buffalo Bills (1978–1979); New York Giants (1980); Boston Breakers (1983); Boston Breakers (1984)

Awards and highlights
- Second-team All-SEC (1976); Mississippi State Freshman rushing record in a single game (174)

Career NFL statistics
- Rushing yards: 227
- Rushing average: 3.9
- Rushing touchdowns: 2
- Stats at Pro Football Reference

Dennis D. Johnson (born February 26, 1956) is an American former professional football player who was a fullback and tight end in the National Football League (NFL) for the Buffalo Bills and New York Giants. He played college football for the Mississippi State Bulldogs and was selected in the third round of the 1978 NFL draft.

== Professional career ==
=== Buffalo Bills ===
The Buffalo Bills selected him in the third round (59th overall) of the 1978 NFL draft. He played in 16 games during their 1978 season and in the first three games of their 1979 season. On October 6, 1979, Johnson was placed on the injured reserve list with a knee injury for the remainder of the 1979 season. The Bills released him on September 3, 1980.

=== New York Giants ===
Johnson signed with the New York Giants as a tight end on December 3, 1980, and he played in the final two games of the 1980 season. He returned in 1981, but was placed on the injured reserve list with a knee problem on August 3, 1981, through the entire 1981 season.

=== Boston/New Orleans Breakers ===
On February 3, 1983, he signed with the Boston Breakers of the United States Football League. During the Breakers' 1983 season, he rushed for 165 yards on 44 carries with one touchdown and had one touchdown reception. He also scored on a two-point conversion. The Breakers cut him on January 28, 1984.

=== Pittsburgh Maulers ===
On June 7, 1984, Johnson signed with the Pittsburgh Maulers of the United States Football League.
