= Will Grant =

American football player (born 1954)

No. 53, 52
- Position: Center

Personal information
- Born: March 7, 1954 (age 72); Milton, Massachusetts, U.S.
- Listed height: 6 ft 3 in (1.91 m)
- Listed weight: 254 lb (115 kg)

Career information
- High school: Thayer Academy (MA)
- College: Idaho State; Kentucky
- NFL draft: 1978: 10th round, 255th overall pick

Career history
- Buffalo Bills (1978–1985); Seattle Seahawks (1986); Buffalo Bills (1987)

Career NFL statistics
- Games played: 129
- Games started: 95
- Fumble recoveries: 4
- Stats at Pro Football Reference

Wilfred L. Grant (born March 7, 1954) is an American former professional football player who was a center in the National Football League (NFL) for the Buffalo Bills and Seattle Seahawks. He played college football for the Idaho State Bengals and Kentucky Wildcats.

== University of Kentucky ==
Grant played college football at the University of Kentucky.

== Buffalo Bills ==
Will Grant was taken by the Buffalo Bills in the 10th round (255th overall) of the 1978 NFL draft. He became their starting center in his third year (1980) for all 16 games between left offensive guard Reggie McKenzie and right guard Conrad Dobler, replacing Willie Parker (offensive lineman), also the third year of head coach Chuck Knox, when the team won the AFC East division title with Joe Ferguson as the quarterback, but lost their first playoff game to the San Diego Chargers. Grant remained their starting center for the next 5 years, up to his final year in Buffalo (1985), starting in 16, 9 out of 9 (strike year), 16, 16, and 15 games, respectively. In 1981, with Ferguson still at quarterback, the Bills made the playoffs for the second year in a row with a 10-6 won-lost record, won a wild-card match against the New York Jets but lost to the Cincinnati Bengals in the divisional round. After that, the team tailed off to 4–5, 8-8, 2–14, and 2-14 won-lost records. In 1986, Grant was replaced by rookie Kent Hull.

== Seattle Seahawks ==
Grant then joined Knox with the Seattle Seahawks in 1986 and 1987, starting 6 games in 1986 but only once in 1987, his final year in the NFL.
