= Gary Thompson (gridiron football) =

American football player (born 1959)

No. 24, 19, 18
- Position: Cornerback

Personal information
- Born: February 23, 1959 (age 67); Castro Valley, California, U.S.
- Listed height: 6 ft 0 in (1.83 m)
- Listed weight: 180 lb (82 kg)

Career information
- High school: Eureka (Eureka, California)
- College: College of the Redwoods

Career history
- San Francisco 49ers (1982)*; Winnipeg Blue Bombers (1983)*; Buffalo Bills (1983–1984); San Francisco 49ers (1985)*; Edmonton Eskimos (1985–1986); Ottawa Rough Riders (1986)*; Toronto Argonauts (1986)*; Edmonton Eskimos (1987)*; Washington Redskins (1988)*
- * Offseason or practice squad member only
- Stats at Pro Football Reference

Gary Thompson (born February 23, 1959) is an American former professional football cornerback who played for the Buffalo Bills of the National Football League (NFL). He played junior college football at the College of the Redwoods.

== Early life ==
Gary Thompson was born on February 23, 1959, in Castro Valley, California. He played high school football at Eureka High School in Eureka, California, as a defensive back and running back. He made an all-star team his senior year, with Thompson later stating "Just because they were short on running backs." He was the only black person in his high school class.

== College career ==
Thompson played two years of junior college football at the College of the Redwoods as a defensive back. In 1982, The Sacramento Bee noted that Thompson did not even earn an honorable mention on the All-Golden Valley Conference team. Thompson later said "The first year was a learning experience. The second year, I had a little more playing time, but it still didn't open any doors. It didn't really push me toward a university."

After his junior college career ended, Thompson moved to San Jose, California, to "be [his] own man". He did detail work on automobiles for two years, and then began working in public relations for an electronics company. He started playing for the semi-pro San Jose Tigers. He intercepted three passes in his first game and had intercepted six through his first five games.

== Professional career ==
Former San Francisco 49ers player Billy Wilson, who had been a coach for the San Jose Tigers a few years before Thompson began playing for them, invited some of the Tigers players to tryout for the 49ers after the 1982 NFL draft. Thompson impressed the team, and signed a contract on May 4, 1982. He was released by the 49ers on August 31, 1982, after the third of four preseason games.

Thompson signed with the Winnipeg Blue Bombers of the Canadian Football League (CFL) in 1983. He was released on July 3, 1983, before the start of the regular season.

Thompson was signed by the Buffalo Bills on July 14, 1983. He played in all 16 games for the Bills during the 1983 season as a reserve cornerback. He appeared in eight games, starting one, in 1984 before being released on October 24, 1984.

Thompsons signed with the 49ers again on April 16, 1985. He was released on August 13, 1985, after the first game of the 1985 preseason.

Thompson was signed by the Edmonton Eskimos on August 21, 1985. He dressed in seven games for Edmonton during the 1985 season as a defensive halfback/cornerback, recording five interceptions for 72 yards and one touchdown, one kickoff return for 21 yards, and three punt returns for 20 yards. He dressed in ten games in 1986 as a cornerback, totaling three interceptions for 21 yards and one fumble recovery for 22 yards. On September 8, 1986, Eskimos defensive secondary coach Don Sutherin said Thompson would have to "upgrade his play, and soon." He was released on September 11, 1986. Thompson said his poor play was due to personal problems. In October 1987, he sued the Eskimos, stating he agreed to a three-year contract that would have paid him a $10,000 signing bonus, $71,500 in 1986, $80,000 in 1987, and $90,000 in 1988.

In mid-September 1986, the Ottawa Rough Riders signed Thompson to a trial. He never played in a game for them.

On October 24, 1986, it was reported that Thompson had been signed to the practice roster of the Toronto Argonauts. He later signed with the Argonauts for the 1987 season. He was released on June 22, 1987, before the start of the regular season.

On July 2, 1987, it was reported that Thompson had been signed to the Eskimos' practice roster. He was released on July 9, 1987.

Thompson was signed by the Washington Redskins on April 15, 1988. He was released on August 1, 1988, before the first preseason game.
