= Marco Tongue =

American football player (born 1960)

No. 46, 30
- Position: Defensive back

Personal information
- Born: April 6, 1960 (age 66); Annapolis, Maryland, U.S.
- Listed height: 5 ft 9 in (1.75 m)
- Listed weight: 177 lb (80 kg)

Career information
- High school: Annapolis
- College: Bowie State
- NFL draft: 1983: undrafted

Career history
- Baltimore Colts (1983); Buffalo Bills (1984)

Career NFL statistics
- Games played: 8
- Games started: 0
- Fumble recoveries: 1
- Stats at Pro Football Reference

Marco Charles Tongue (born April 6, 1960) is an American former professional football player who was a defensive back in the National Football League (NFL). He played college football for the Bowie State Bulldogs. He played in the NFL for two seasons with the Baltimore Colts (1983) and Buffalo Bills (1984).
