= Roland Hooks =

American football player (born 1953)

No. 25
- Position: Running back

Personal information
- Born: January 2, 1953 (age 73); Brooklyn, New York, U.S.
- Listed height: 6 ft 0 in (1.83 m)
- Listed weight: 197 lb (89 kg)

Career information
- High school: West Craven (Vanceboro, North Carolina)
- College: NC State
- NFL draft: 1975: 10th round, 253rd overall pick

Career history
- Buffalo Bills (1975–1982)

Career NFL statistics
- Rushing attempts: 399
- Rushing yards: 1,682
- Rushing touchdowns: 12
- Stats at Pro Football Reference

Roland L. Hooks (born January 2, 1953) is an American former professional football player who was a running back in the National Football League (NFL) who played for the Buffalo Bills. He played college football for the NC State Wolfpack.

== Early life ==
Hooks attended Farm Life High School in Vanceboro, NC. He accepted a football scholarship from North Carolina State University.

As a sophomore in 1972, when Lou Holtz arrived as the new head coach at North Carolina State University, he implemented split-back veer offense to take advantage of the talent at running back, that included Hooks, Stan Fritts, Willie Burden and Charley Young. At the time, this was arguably the best group of running backs in the nation, they were known as "The Four Stallions" and everyone of them went on to play in a professional football league. He posted 62 carries (sixth on the team) for 283 yards (fourth on the team), a 4.6-yard average and 2 rushing touchdowns.

As a junior in 1973, he was part of the Atlantic Coast Conference championship team as a halfback. He registered 48 carries (fifth on the team) for 235 yards (fourth on the team), a 4.9-yard average and one rushing touchdown.

As a senior in 1974, he was second on the team behind Fritts with 136 carries for 850 yards, a 6.3-yard average and 9 rushing touchdowns. He finished his college career with 246 carries for 1,368 yards, a 5.6-yard average and 12 rushing touchdowns.

== Professional career ==
Hooks was selected by the Buffalo Bills in the tenth round (253rd overall) of the 1975 NFL draft.

He scored four touchdowns in the second half on his first four carries (3 yds, 32 yds, 4 yds, 28 yds) in the Bills 51-24 win over the Cincinnati Bengals on September 9, 1979.

Hooks might be best known for a Hail Mary catch he made against the New England Patriots on November 22, 1981. The 36-yard touchdown pass from Bills quarterback Joe Ferguson with five seconds remaining won the game for Buffalo, 20-17. Hooks set up the winning touchdown with a 37-yard, over-the-shoulder catch. The win proved to be crucial in giving Buffalo the final playoff spot in the AFC in 1981.

In 98 career games, including nine starts, he rushed for 1,682 yards on 399 carries and scored 12 touchdowns and added 950 yards on 96 receptions and 3 TDs. He was waived by the Bills in August 1984 after spending the 1983 season on injured reserve with a knee injury.

== NFL career statistics ==
Legend
**Bold**	Career high

=== Regular season ===
Year	Team	Games		Rushing					Receiving				
Year	Team	GP	GS	Att	Yds	Avg	Lng	TD	Rec	Yds	Avg	Lng	TD
1976	BUF	14	1	25	116	4.6	24	0	6	72	12.0	28	0
1977	BUF	14	**7**	**128**	**497**	3.9	**66**	0	16	195	12.2	33	0
1978	BUF	**16**	0	76	358	4.7	**66**	2	15	110	7.3	21	1
1979	BUF	**16**	0	89	320	3.6	32	**6**	**26**	**254**	9.8	**42**	0
1980	BUF	**16**	0	25	118	4.7	25	1	23	179	7.8	26	0
1981	BUF	**16**	1	51	250	**4.9**	19	3	10	140	**14.0**	37	**2**
1982	BUF	6	0	5	23	4.6	9	0	0	0	0.0	0	0
		98	9	399	1,682	4.2	66	12	96	950	9.9	42	3

=== Playoffs ===
Year	Team	Games		Rushing					Receiving				
Year	Team	GP	GS	Att	Yds	Avg	Lng	TD	Rec	Yds	Avg	Lng	TD
1980	BUF	1	0	0	0	0.0	0	0	1	1	1.0	1	0
1981	BUF	**2**	0	**9**	**30**	**3.3**	**7**	0	**2**	**15**	**7.5**	**9**	0
		3	0	9	30	3.3	7	0	3	16	5.3	9	0

== Personal life ==
Hooks was an assistant football coach at Galena High School in Reno, Nevada.
