= Terry Miller (running back) =

American football player (born 1956)

No. 40, 34
- Positions: Running back, kickoff returner

Personal information
- Born: January 7, 1956 (age 70); Columbus, Georgia, U.S.
- Listed height: 5 ft 10 in (1.78 m)
- Listed weight: 196 lb (89 kg)

Career information
- High school: Mitchell (Colorado Springs, Colorado)
- College: Oklahoma State (1974–1977)
- NFL draft: 1978: 1st round, 5th overall pick

Career history
- Buffalo Bills (1978–1980); Seattle Seahawks (1981)

Awards and highlights
- PFWA All-Rookie Team (1978); Unanimous All-American (1977); First-team All-American (1976); 2× Big Eight Offensive Player of the Year (1976, 1977); 3× First-team All-Big Eight (1975–1977); Oklahoma State Cowboys No. 43 retired

Career NFL statistics
- Rushing yards: 1,583
- Rushing average: 4
- Rushing touchdowns: 8
- Receptions: 35
- Receiving yards: 382
- Kickoff return yards: 480
- Stats at Pro Football Reference
- College Football Hall of Fame

Terry Miller (born January 7, 1956) is an American former professional football player who was a running back and kickoff returner in the National Football League (NFL) with the Buffalo Bills and the Seattle Seahawks.

Miller played college football for the Oklahoma State Cowboys. He was twice All-American in 1976 and 1977 and finished second in the 1977 Heisman Trophy voting to winner Earl Campbell.

Miller ran for 1,060 yards in his NFL rookie season, but had only 484 total rushing yards in his second season (second to Bills fullback Curtis Brown). By 1980, with Buffalo having found a star in rookie running back Joe Cribbs, Miller was relegated to mostly Kickoff returner duty. Miller was voted into the College Football Hall of Fame in 2022.
