= Hank Rivera =

American football player (born 1938)

No. 23, 20
- Position: Defensive back

Personal information
- Born: December 25, 1938; Los Angeles, California, U.S.
- Died: December 23, 1996 (aged 57); Portland, Oregon, U.S.
- Listed height: 5 ft 11 in (1.80 m)
- Listed weight: 180 lb (82 kg)

Career information
- High school: Belmont (CA)
- College: Oregon State
- NFL draft: 1962: 5th round, 67th overall pick
- AFL draft: 1962: 10th round, 73rd overall pick

Career history
- Oakland Raiders (1962); Buffalo Bills (1963)

Career AFL statistics
- Games played: 12
- Games started: 7
- Stats at Pro Football Reference

Henry Charles Rivera (December 25, 1938) is a former professional football defensive back who played for the Oakland Raiders of the American Football League (AFL). He was drafted in the 10th round of the 1962 AFL Draft. Rivera also played for the Buffalo Bills.

== College career ==
Rivera played for Oregon State in college.

== Career statistics ==
Year	Team	Games		Interceptions						Fumbles
Year	Team	GP	GS	Int	Yds	Avg	Lng	TDs	FR	
1962	OAK	9	6	0	0	0.0	0	0	0	
Career		9	6	0	0	0.0	0	0	0	
Source: Pro-Football-Reference.com
