= Mario Celotto =

American football player (born 1956)

No. 58, 52, 41
- Position: Linebacker

Personal information
- Born: August 23, 1956 (age 70); Los Angeles, California, U.S.
- Listed height: 6 ft 3 in (1.91 m)
- Listed weight: 228 lb (103 kg)

Career information
- High school: St. Bernard (Los Angeles)
- College: USC
- NFL draft: 1978: 7th round, 171st overall pick

Career history
- Buffalo Bills (1978); Oakland Raiders (1980–1981); Baltimore Colts (1981); Los Angeles Rams (1981)

Awards and highlights
- Super Bowl champion (XV)
- Stats at Pro Football Reference

Mario Raymond Celotto (born August 23, 1956) is an American former professional football player who was a linebacker in the National Football League (NFL). He played college football for the USC Trojans.

== Football career ==
Born in Los Angeles, California, and raised in Rancho Palos Verdes, California, to Ray and Cecilia E. Celotto, owners of Dreamland Bedding Corporation, Celotto graduated from St. Bernard High School and played college football at the University of Southern California from 1974 to 1977. During the game against rival Notre Dame in his 1977 senior season, Celotto once recovered a fumble by Terry Eurick of Notre Dame at the Notre Dame 5-yard line and scored a touchdown. He was selected in the 7th round (171st overall) of the 1978 NFL draft by the Buffalo Bills. He played for the Oakland Raiders for the 1980 season, when the Raiders won Super Bowl XV; the next season, he played for the Raiders, Los Angeles Rams, and Baltimore Colts. After 1981, Celotto left the NFL due to a knee injury.

== After football ==
After retiring from football, Celotto founded Humboldt Brewing Company in 1987. In 1997, Humboldt Brewing merged with Mendocino Brewing.

== Personal life ==
Mario Celotto met Julia Lendl, who played track and volleyball at USC, and married her after she graduated with a degree in physical education. They had two sons. His younger son, Tonio Dante Celotto, played college football at the University of Oregon in the 2007 and 2008 seasons and graduated from Piedmont High School in 2007. After Julia divorced Mario, he married Deirdre Taylor Haizlip, group account director at Carol H. Williams Advertising. Their wedding took place on May 21, 2005 at Charlotte Amalie, United States Virgin Islands and officiated by The Rev. Skip Sikora from San Francisco. In 2009, Tonio Celotto left the team and said that he was interested in joining the Los Angeles Police Department.

On February 4, 2011, arranged by the Silicon Valley Education Foundation, Celotto visited a physics class in Yerba Buena High School in San Jose, California to demonstrate how Newton's laws of motion apply to football.
