= Dan Manucci =

American football player and sports radio personality (born 1957)

No. 11
- Position: Quarterback

Personal information
- Born: September 3, 1957 (age 69); Erie, Pennsylvania, U.S.
- Listed height: 6 ft 2 in (1.88 m)
- Listed weight: 196 lb (89 kg)

Career information
- High school: Tempe (AZ) McClintock
- College: Kansas State
- NFL draft: 1979: 5th round, 116th overall pick

Career history
- Buffalo Bills (1979–1980); Toronto Argonauts (1981); Arizona Wranglers (1983); Buffalo Bills (1987)

Career NFL statistics
- Passing attempts: 27
- Passing completions: 12
- Completion percentage: 44.4%
- TD–INT: 0–2
- Passing yards: 132
- Passer rating: 28.6
- Stats at Pro Football Reference

Daniel Joseph Manucci III (born September 3, 1957) is an American former professional football player who was a quarterback for the Buffalo Bills of the National Football League (NFL). He played college football for the Kansas State Wildcats. After his football career, he became a sports radio personality.

Manucci played his short NFL career as a backup for the Buffalo Bills in the early 1980s, and returned to the team in 1987 during the player's strike, playing as a replacement player. He also played for the Canadian Football League (CFL)'s Toronto Argonauts (1981) and the United States Football League (USFL)'s Arizona Wranglers (1983)

He is currently co-host of the sports radio talk show "Roc and Manuch;" a daily local show on KGME in Phoenix, Arizona. He has two children—a son and a daughter.
