= Marvin Switzer =

American football player (born 1954)

No. 21
- Position: Defensive back

Personal information
- Born: October 28, 1954 (age 72); Bogue, Kansas, U.S.
- Listed height: 6 ft 0 in (1.83 m)
- Listed weight: 192 lb (87 kg)

Career information
- High school: Bogue (KS)
- College: Kansas State
- NFL draft: 1978: undrafted

Career history
- Buffalo Bills (1978)
- Stats at Pro Football Reference

Marvin Switzer (born October 28, 1954) is an American former professional football player who was a defensive back for the Buffalo Bills of the National Football League (NFL) in 1978. He played college football for the Kansas State Wildcats.
