= Curtis Brown (running back, born 1954) =

American football player (1954–2015)

No. 47, 38
- Position: Running back

Personal information
- Born: December 7, 1954; St. Louis, Missouri, U.S.
- Died: July 30, 2015 (aged 60); St. Louis, Missouri, U.S.
- Listed height: 5 ft 10 in (1.78 m)
- Listed weight: 203 lb (92 kg)

Career information
- High school: St. Charles (MO)
- College: Missouri
- NFL draft: 1977: 3rd round, 59th overall pick

Career history
- Buffalo Bills (1977–1982); Houston Oilers (1983)

Career NFL statistics
- Rushing attempts: 567
- Rushing yards: 2,171
- Rushing TDs: 9
- Stats at Pro Football Reference

Curtis Jerome Brown (December 7, 1954 – July 31, 2015) was an American professional football running back with the Buffalo Bills and Houston Oilers in the National Football League (NFL). He played college football at the University of Missouri.

Brown died July 30, 2015, from a heart attack; he experienced dementia in his later years believed to stem from his playing days. He was one of at least 345 NFL players to be diagnosed after death with chronic traumatic encephalopathy (CTE), caused by repeated hits to the head.

== NFL career statistics ==
Legend
**Bold**	Career high

=== Regular season ===
Year	Team	Games		Rushing					Receiving				
Year	Team	GP	GS	Att	Yds	Avg	Lng	TD	Rec	Yds	Avg	Lng	TD
1977	BUF	7	0	8	34	4.3	9	0	5	20	4.0	12	1
1978	BUF	15	10	128	**591**	**4.6**	**58**	**4**	18	130	7.2	31	0
1979	BUF	15	15	**172**	574	3.3	25	1	**39**	**401**	**10.3**	**84**	**3**
1980	BUF	**16**	**16**	153	559	3.7	34	3	27	137	5.1	20	0
1981	BUF	14	8	62	226	3.6	13	0	7	46	6.6	10	1
1982	BUF	9	3	41	187	**4.6**	19	0	6	38	6.3	28	0
1983	HOU	2	0	3	0	0.0	1	1	0	0	0.0	0	0
Career		78	52	567	2,171	3.8	58	9	102	772	7.6	84	5

=== Playoffs ===
Year	Team	Games		Rushing					Receiving				
Year	Team	GP	GS	Att	Yds	Avg	Lng	TD	Rec	Yds	Avg	Lng	TD
1980	BUF	1	**1**	**9**	**17**	1.9	**5**	0	0	0	0.0	0	0
1981	BUF	**2**	0	1	2	**2.0**	2	0	0	0	0.0	0	0
Career		3	1	10	19	1.9	5	0	0	0	0.0	0	0
