= Chuck Knox =

American football player and coach (1932–2018)

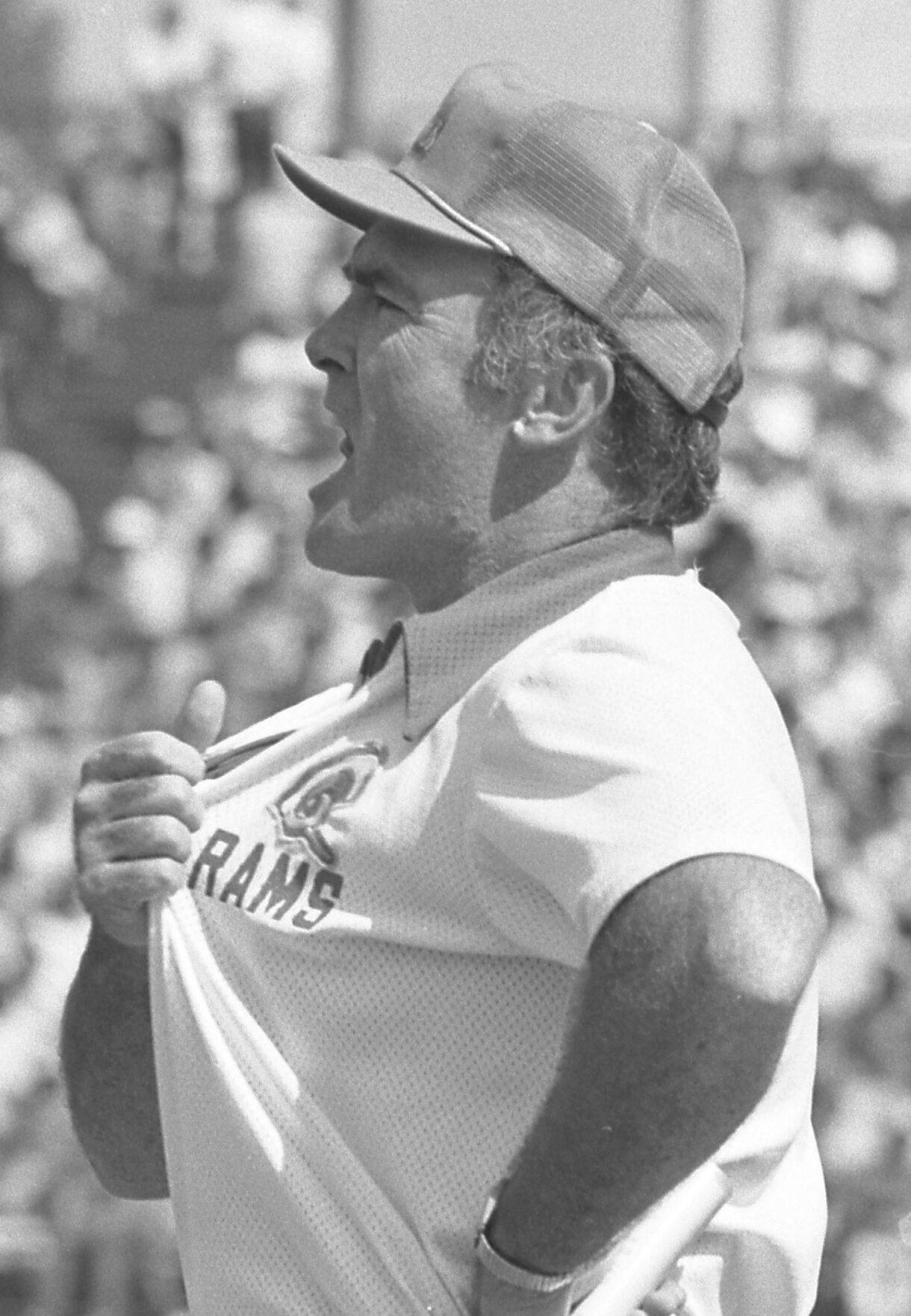
- Knox in 1973

Personal information
- Born: April 27, 1932; Sewickley, Pennsylvania, U.S.
- Died: May 12, 2018 (aged 86); Anaheim, California, U.S.

Career information
- High school: Sewickley
- College: Juniata

Career history
- Juniata (1954) Line coach; Tyrone HS (PA) (1955) Line coach; Ellwood City HS (PA) (1956–1958) Head coach; Wake Forest (1959–1960) Tackles coach; Kentucky (1961–1962) Offensive line coach; New York Jets (1963–1966) Offensive line coach; Detroit Lions (1967–1972) Offensive line coach; Los Angeles Rams (1973–1977) Head coach; Buffalo Bills (1978–1982) Head coach; Seattle Seahawks (1983–1991) Head coach; Los Angeles Rams (1992–1994) Head coach

Awards and highlights
- 3× AP NFL Coach of the Year (1973, 1980, 1984); Seattle Seahawks Ring of Honor

Head coaching record
- Regular season: 186–147 (.559)
- Postseason: 7–11 (.389)
- Career: 193–158 (.550)
- Coaching profile at Pro Football Reference

Charles Robert Knox (April 27, 1932 – May 12, 2018) was an American football coach at the high school, collegiate and professional levels. He served as head coach of three National Football League (NFL) teams, the Los Angeles Rams (1973–1977; 1992–1994), Buffalo Bills (1978–1982), and Seattle Seahawks (1983–1991). He was a three-time AP NFL Coach of the Year and is a member of the Seahawks Ring of Honor.

== Early life and education ==
Knox was born in Sewickley, Pennsylvania, a suburb of Pittsburgh. Whenever Knox felt something was common sense, he said it was "eighth-grade Sewickley."

The son of a steel worker who had emigrated from Ireland and a Scottish-born mother, Knox developed into a 190-pound (86 kg) tackle at Juniata College in Huntingdon, Pennsylvania, playing on both sides of the ball and serving as co-captain of the 1953 unit, the first undefeated team in school history. He also competed in track and graduated in 1954.

== Assistant coaching career ==
Knox then served as an assistant at Juniata that fall. The following year he became an assistant coach at Tyrone High School, then began the first of three years as head coach at Ellwood City High School in 1956.

Building on his success, Knox then moved back to the colleges, serving two seasons as an assistant under Paul Amen at Wake Forest University in 1959. He then joined Blanton Collier's staff at the University of Kentucky in 1961, and stayed the following year under new mentor Charlie Bradshaw. In both these places, Knox learned the concepts of organization, discipline and a focus on fundamentals. While at Kentucky, Knox was on the staff of Bradshaw's infamous first team, which was known forever as the Thin Thirty.

On May 8, 1963, he was hired as offensive line coach of the American Football League's New York Jets by head coach Weeb Ewbank. Over the next four years as the lead contact for recruiting quarterback Joe Namath, Knox helped build a line that protected Namath, eventually leading to a victory over the Baltimore Colts in Super Bowl III. However, by voluntarily leaving the Jets in 1967 he denied himself what would have been the only Super Bowl ring in his career as the Jets won the World Championship in 1968.

Knox then moved to the Detroit Lions on February 13, 1967, under new head coach Joe Schmidt, spending six seasons in the Motor City. Despite some impressive stretches, the Lions reached the postseason only once during this period, losing a 5–0 road contest to the Dallas Cowboys in 1970. However, Knox developed effectively cohesive offensive lines and developed pass-blocking techniques that are now standard in blocking fundamentals. Additionally, he proved a progressive coach by playing Bill Cottrell, an African American, at center. "There was an unwritten rule back then", said Cottrell in Hard Knox: The Life of an NFL Coach. "No black quarterbacks, no black middle linebackers, no black centers." Because of Knox's liberal views and ability to relate to players on such a personal level, African American players nicknamed him, "Dolomite."

== Head coaching career ==
=== Los Angeles Rams ===
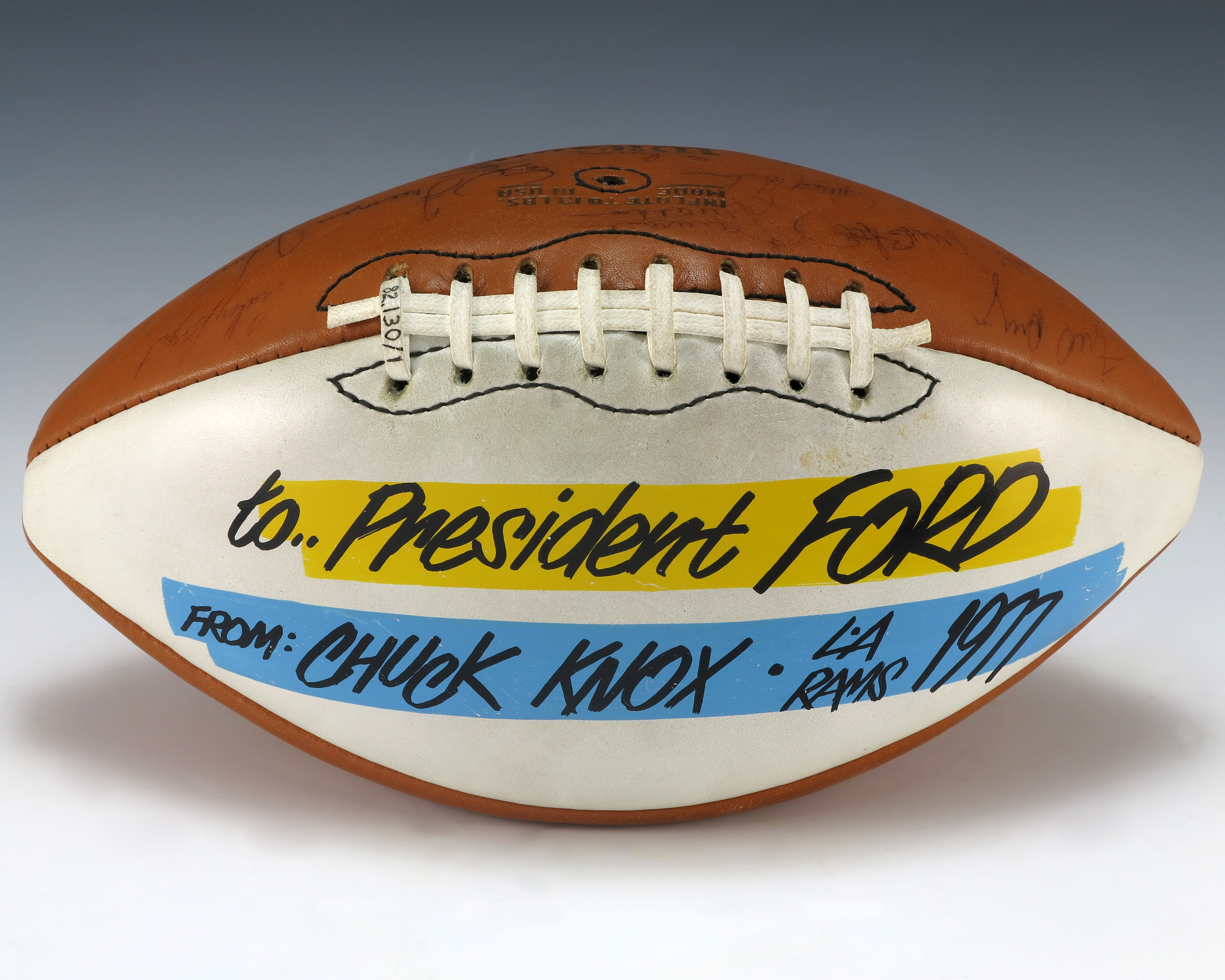
A football signed by the 1977 Los Angeles Rams, including Knox, Tom Mack, Joe Namath, Pat Haden, and Vince Ferragamo, which was given to President Ford

When Tommy Prothro was dismissed on January 24, 1973, Knox was hired as head coach of the Los Angeles Rams.

Sometimes referred to as "Ground Chuck" for his team's emphasis on its rushing attack, Knox used a comeback year by veteran quarterback John Hadl to lead the Rams to a 12–2 record during his first season, winning the NFC West title. Knox earned NFC Coach of the Year honors, but in the first round of the playoffs, the team lost to the Cowboys, beginning what would become a frustrating string of playoff defeats for Knox.

John Hadl became the 1973 NFC Most Valuable Player under Knox, proof that the passing dimension of his offense was as significant as the run game in his system. Six games into the 1974 season, Knox traded Hadl, whose performance had diminished from his MVP 1973 season, to the Green Bay Packers for an unprecedented two first round picks, two second round picks and a third-round pick. Knox started James Harris (who had been on the roster when Prothro was fired and retained by Knox due to the notes given by Prothro) for the remainder of the 1974 season. Harris became the NFL's first African American regular quarterback. Despite two and a half successful seasons, including a 12–2 record in 1975 with Harris under center, some Rams fans remained critical of the play of Harris. Under pressure from owner Carroll Rosenbloom and general manager Don Klosterman, Knox was forced to bench Harris in favor of Pat Haden when Harris had a knee injury in the middle of the 1976 season. Harris was traded to the San Diego Chargers the following year. Knox later related his experience with coaching Harris decades later: “He was the NFL’s first black regular quarterback, which didn’t mean a thing to me. However, he was the first quarterback that I developed, which did. I really liked James Harris. It was obvious he had the ability and had never gotten the chance.”

Under Knox, the Rams won five straight NFC West championships, making Knox the second coach to win division championships in each of his first five seasons after Paul Brown. However, they faltered in the playoffs, losing three consecutive NFC Championship games in 1974, 1975, and 1976, two of which were to the Minnesota Vikings. In the team's rainy first round home playoff game against the Vikings on December 26, 1977, quarterback Pat Haden was having problems handling the wet ball and the Rams lost in what was subsequently called the "Mud Bowl" by a score of 14–7.

Knox stepped down as Rams' head coach after the game. On January 11, 1978, Knox left the Rams to sign a $1.2 million, six-year contract with the Buffalo Bills. The move was in response to the continuing conflict between Knox and team owner Carroll Rosenbloom. In five seasons as the Rams head coach the team had won five straight NFC West titles with five different starting quarterbacks (John Hadl, Ron Jaworski, Pat Haden, James Harris, and Joe Namath) and had a regular season record of 54–15–1 but a play-off record of only 3–5. Knox was the first coach to lead the team to consecutive playoff appearances since the 1949–1952 teams.

=== Buffalo Bills ===
The Bills had won just five of their last 28 games when Knox arrived in 1978. Two months after Knox arrived, the team traded the aging legend O. J. Simpson for five draft picks. That season, the first under the new 16-game schedule, Knox led the Bills to a 5–11 mark. The following year saw them close the season out with three straight losses to finish 7–9. Fred Smerlas credited Knox as a key influence on his young career. A couple of games in his rookie season in 1979, Knox was quoted as stating to Smerlas, "Big, mean and tough, really? You suck. I wasted a second-round pick on you." Suddenly taken out of the roster, Smerlas decided to study the tapes of Curley Culp to work on his footwork and hands for a two-gap technique as a nose tackle. Eventually, Smerlas got back onto the lineup with improved footing. In 1980, the Bills made their mark from the get-go, delivering a 17–7 victory to fans over the Miami Dolphins to break a 20-game losing streak to the Dolphins, who hadn't lost to Buffalo since 1969. The fans celebrated so much that they ripped out the goalposts after the game ended. The efforts of defensive pros such as nose tackle Fred Smerlas and linebackers Shane Nelson and Jim Haslett led to the group being called the "Bermuda Triangle". Defensive coordinator Tom Catlin led a prime defense to go along with a 1,000-yard season from rookie back Joe Cribbs as the Bills won their first five games on their way to a 11–5 record and the AFC East championship. It was the Bills' first division title since the AFL-NFL merger, and only their second playoff appearance since then. Three weeks to the end of the season, quarterback Joe Ferguson suffered a fractured ankle. He would try to play through it the rest of the season. In the five-team AFC bracket, the Bills travelled to play the San Diego Chargers (champions of the AFC West). The Bills led from the second quarter to late in the fourth quarter until a touchdown with 2:08 remaining gave San Diego a 20–14 lead that was soon followed by a Ferguson interception (his third of the day) to clinch the game for San Diego.

The following season saw them win 10 games after winning four of the last five games but qualify for the postseason as the 5 seed. They defeated the Jets 31-27 before losing to the eventual AFC champion Cincinnati Bengals 28-21. The strike-shortened 1982 season (where the teams went on strike after being 2-0 with their win on September 16 prior to their return in late November) would see only nine games played. While the team had 1,371 rushing yards (152.3 average per game), the Bills won just two games after the return, which included three straight losses to close the season. On January 25, 1983, Knox, with a year remaining on his contract, resigned after negotiations with team owner Ralph Wilson broke down. He was replaced as head coach by his assistant Kay Stephenson.

=== Seattle Seahawks ===
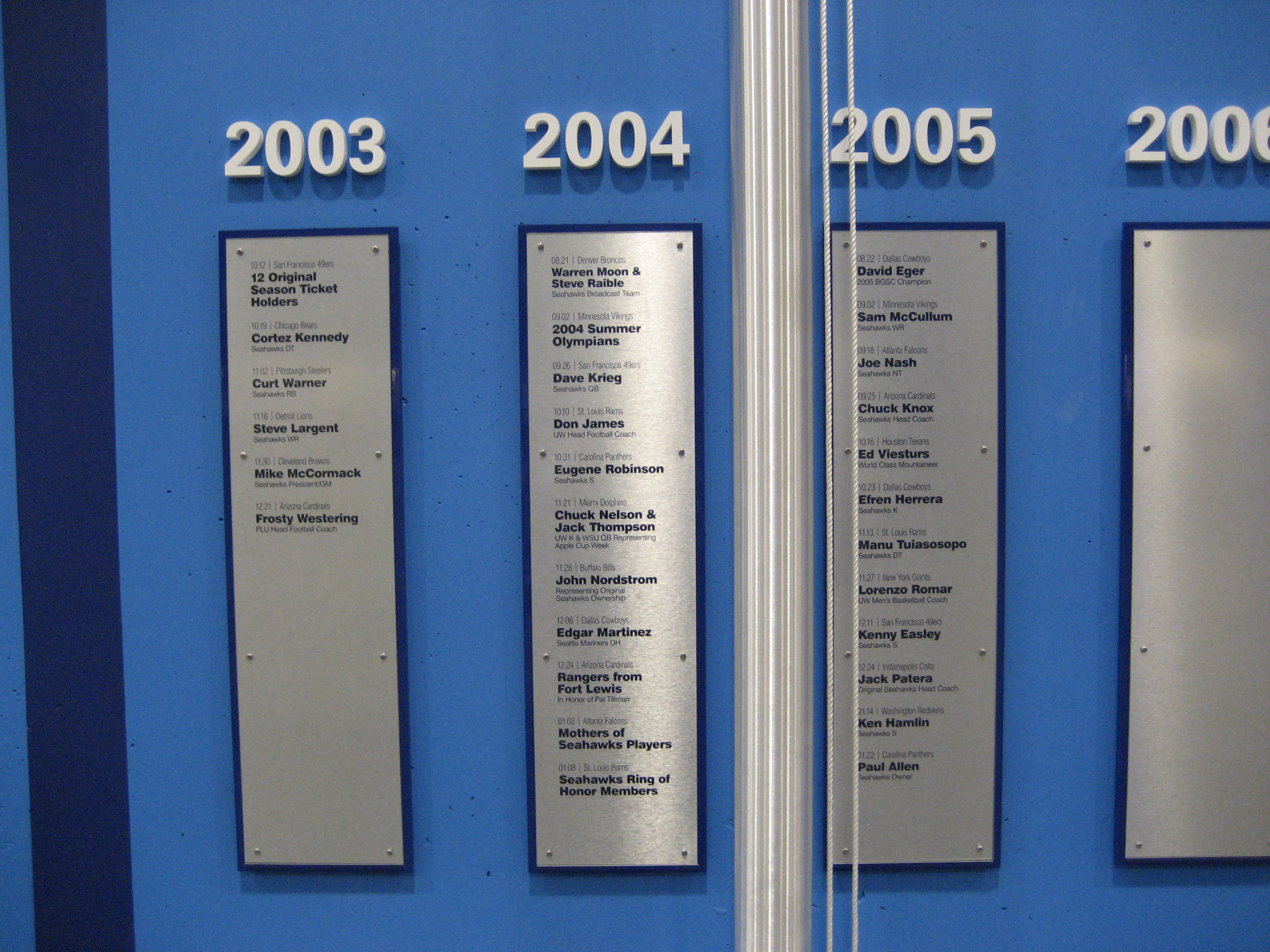
Close up of those who've hoisted the 12th Man Flag, including Knox

On January 26, 1983, Knox was hired to coach the Seattle Seahawks. He immediately went to work on trying to build a rushing attack with an ideal running back. In the 1983 NFL draft, the Seahawks traded three picks (first, second, and third round) to the Houston Oilers to move their position in the first round from 9th to 3rd in order to draft Curt Warner.

During his first year in the Northwest, Knox led the team to its first playoff berth on the feet of Warner, who ran for 1,449 yards and 13 touchdowns. The Seahawks were matched against the Denver Broncos in the Wild Card game and won 31–7. They then played the Miami Dolphins on the road at the Orange Bowl and pulled off a 27–20 upset. However, Seattle's playoff run ended in the AFC Championship game when the Seahawks fell to the Los Angeles Raiders by a score of 30–14. Subsequent seasons saw the Seahawks remain competitive despite injuries to Warner, who suffered a massive knee injury on the Kingdome turf in the 1984 opener. The 1988 team won the AFC West, their first division championship in team history that also made Knox the first head coach in history to win division titles with three different teams, but the team failed to reach the AFC Championship Game in the rest of Knox's tenure. He closed out his tenure with a 7–9 record in 1991, the third straight season where Seattle failed to reach the postseason. After nine years with Seattle, Knox mutually agreed with club owner Ken Behring and general manager Tom Flores to resign, having gone 80-63 in his tenure; Flores replaced him as coach.

=== Return to the Rams ===
Looking to recapture the magic of two decades earlier, Knox returned to the Rams as head coach on January 8, 1992, on a four-year contract. The team had gone a combined 8-24 in the last two seasons, and it was understood that he would be doing a "complete rebuilding program." His first season saw them win six games while giving up an average of 140 yards a game, the worst in the league. The following year saw Jerome Bettis drafted in the first round at running back. While he would blossom into a star, Knox's team would finish last in the NFC West in 1993, going 5–11 while losing ten games by at least ten points, the most in a season in Rams history. Around this time, fans began criticizing his offense as too dull and predictable for the 1990s.

In his final season in 1994, the team did worse. They finished 4–12, losing seven games in a row to finish last in the division once again. He was fired on January 9, 1995, and replaced by Rich Brooks. Knox retired with a mark of 186–147–1, which at the time of his retirement was sixth all-time in wins. He had reached the postseason eleven times in 22 seasons as a head coach.

== Philanthropy ==
In 2005, Knox donated $1 million to his alma mater, Juniata College, to endow a chair in history, his major at the school. The donation was the largest of many contributions by Knox, with the institution renaming the school's football stadium in his honor in 1998. Quaker Valley High School in Knox's hometown of Sewickley, Pennsylvania also named its football stadium in his honor.

In reporting about Knox's $1 million donation, The Seattle Times reported that Knox has been extremely generous in donating substantial money to Juniata and his old high school. The Times also noted that Knox left football before coaches were paid the large sum of salaries common today and reporters asked whether he was donating away a substantial amount of his retirement fund. Knox said, "Sure it is (a lot of money).....that's what it was going to take to do it".

On September 25, 2005, at age 73, Knox was inducted into the Seattle Seahawks' Ring of Honor at Qwest Field in Seattle and is regularly under consideration for nomination into the Pro Football Hall of Fame in Canton, Ohio. In 2015, the Professional Football Researchers Association named Knox to the PFRA Hall of Very Good Class of 2015.

== Personal life ==
Knox's relationship with granddaughter Lee Ann was outlined in an article in The Los Angeles Times in 2016. titled "Knox Has a Loving Advocate for His Legacy in Granddaughter Lee Ann Norman."

== Death ==
On May 12, 2018, Knox died in Anaheim, California at the age of 86, following a lengthy battle with Lewy body dementia. He was survived by his wife of 66 years, Shirley, four children, and six grandchildren.

== Head coaching record ==
Team	Year	Regular season					Postseason			
Team	Year	Won	Lost	Ties	Win %	Finish	Won	Lost	Win %	Result
LA	1973	12	2	0	.857	1st in NFC West	0	1	.000	Lost to Dallas Cowboys in NFC Divisional Game
LA	1974	10	4	0	.714	1st in NFC West	1	1	.500	Lost to Minnesota Vikings in NFC Championship Game
LA	1975	12	2	0	.857	1st in NFC West	1	1	.500	Lost to Dallas Cowboys in NFC Championship Game
LA	1976	10	3	1	.769	1st in NFC West	1	1	.500	Lost to Minnesota Vikings in NFC Championship Game
LA	1977	10	4	0	.714	1st in NFC West	0	1	.000	Lost to Minnesota Vikings in NFC Divisional Game
BUF	1978	5	11	0	.313	4th in AFC East	–	–	–	–
BUF	1979	7	9	0	.438	4th in AFC East	–	–	–	–
BUF	1980	11	5	0	.688	1st in AFC East	0	1	.000	Lost to San Diego Chargers in AFC Divisional Game
BUF	1981	10	6	0	.625	3rd in AFC East	1	1	.500	Lost to Cincinnati Bengals in AFC Divisional Game
BUF	1982	4	5	0	.444	4th in AFC East	–	–	–	–
BUF Total		37	36	0	.507		1	2	.333	–
SEA	1983	9	7	0	.563	2nd in AFC West	2	1	.667	Lost to Los Angeles Raiders in AFC Championship Game
SEA	1984	12	4	0	.750	2nd in AFC West	1	1	.500	Lost to Miami Dolphins in AFC Divisional Game
SEA	1985	8	8	0	.500	3rd in AFC West	–	–	–	–
SEA	1986	10	6	0	.625	2nd in AFC West	–	–	–	–
SEA	1987	9	6	0	.600	2nd in AFC West	0	1	.000	Lost to Houston Oilers in AFC Wild Card Game
SEA	1988	9	7	0	.563	1st in AFC West	0	1	.000	Lost to Cincinnati Bengals in AFC Divisional Game
SEA	1989	7	9	0	.438	4th in AFC West	–	–	–	–
SEA	1990	9	7	0	.563	3rd in AFC West	–	–	–	–
SEA	1991	7	9	0	.438	4th in AFC West	–	–	–	–
SEA Total		80	63	0	.559		3	4	.429	–
LA	1992	6	10	0	.375	4th in NFC West	–	–	–	–
LA	1993	5	11	0	.313	4th in NFC West	–	–	–	–
LA	1994	4	12	0	.250	4th in NFC West	–	–	–	–
LA Total		69	48	1	.589		3	5	.375	–
NFL Total		186	147	1	.558		7	11	.389	–

== See also ==
- List of National Football League head coaches with 50 wins
