= Scott Hutchinson (American football) =

American football player (born 1956)

No. 78, 90, 70
- Position: Defensive end

Personal information
- Born: May 27, 1956 (age 70); Winter Park, Florida, U.S.
- Listed height: 6 ft 4 in (1.93 m)
- Listed weight: 246 lb (112 kg)

Career information
- High school: Winter Park
- College: Florida (1974–1977)
- NFL draft: 1978: 2nd round, 38th overall pick

Career history
- Buffalo Bills (1978–1980); Tampa Bay Buccaneers (1981); Buffalo Bills (1983); Orlando Renegades (1985)

Awards and highlights
- First-team All-SEC (1977)

Career NFL statistics
- Sacks: 3
- Fumble recoveries: 3
- Stats at Pro Football Reference

Scott Rawls Hutchinson (born May 27, 1956) is an American former professional football player who was a defensive end for five seasons in the National Football League (NFL) during the 1970s and 1980s. Hutchinson played college football for the Florida Gators, and thereafter, he played in the NFL for the Buffalo Bills and the Tampa Bay Buccaneers.

== Early life ==
Hutchinson was born in Winter Park, Florida in 1956. He attended Winter Park High School, where he played high school football for the Winter Park Wildcats.

== College career ==
Hutchinson accepted an athletic scholarship to attend the University of Florida in Gainesville, Florida, where he was a defensive lineman for coach Doug Dickey's Gators teams from 1974 to 1977. As a senior team captain in 1977, he was a first-team All-Southeastern Conference (SEC) selection, an Associated Press honorable mention All-American.

== Professional career ==
The Buffalo Bills selected Hutchinson in the second round (38th overall) of the 1978 NFL draft, and he played for the Bills from 1978 to 1980. Hutchinson played for the Tampa Bay Buccaneers for one season in 1981, after being waived by the Bills in the preseason, and part of the 1983 season for the Buffalo Bills again. He finished his professional career with the Orlando Renegades of the United States Football League (USFL) during the league's final spring season in 1985.

In his five-season NFL career, Hutchinson appeared in sixty-nine games, started eight of them, and recovered three fumbles.

== See also ==
- Florida Gators football, 1970–79
- List of Buffalo Bills players
- List of Florida Gators in the NFL draft
