= John Holland (American football) =

American football player (born 1952)

No. 85, 80
- Position: Wide receiver

Personal information
- Born: February 28, 1952 (age 74); Beckley, West Virginia, U.S.
- Listed height: 6 ft 0 in (1.83 m)
- Listed weight: 190 lb (86 kg)

Career information
- High school: Middletown (Middletown, Ohio)
- College: Tennessee State
- NFL draft: 1974: 2nd round, 29th overall pick

Career history
- Minnesota Vikings (1974); Buffalo Bills (1975–1977); Hamilton Tiger-Cats (1979–1980); Calgary Stampeders (1981); Ottawa Rough Riders (1982)

Career NFL statistics
- Receptions: 35
- Receiving yards: 634
- Receiving touchdowns: 3
- Stats at Pro Football Reference

John Holland (born February 28, 1952) is an American former professional football player who was a wide receiver in the National Football League (NFL) and the Canadian Football League (CFL). He played college football for the Tennessee State Tigers.

== Early life ==
Holland was born in Beckley, West Virginia and grew up in Middletown, Ohio, where he attended Middletown High School.

== College career ==
Holland played college football for the Tennessee State Tigers. As a senior he caught 53 passes for 739 yards and 11 touchdowns and was named third-team Little All-America by the Associated Press as the Tigers won the 1973 Black College National Championship. Holland finished his collegiate career with 109 receptions for 1,622 yards and 22 touchdowns.

== Professional career ==
Holland was selected 29th overall by the Minnesota Vikings in the second round of the 1974 NFL draft. He caught five passes for 84 yards as a rookie. Holland was cut during the 1975 preseason and was signed by the Buffalo Bills. He caught passes of 53 and 58 yards for touchdowns in the 1976 season opener against the Miami Dolphins on Monday Night Football. He was a starter for the Bills at the beginning of the 1977 season but was put on season-ending injured reserve after breaking his jaw three games in. Holland became a free agent after the season and was not signed by any team for the 1978 season. Holland finished his NFL career with 35 receptions for 634 yards and three touchdowns.

Holland was signed by the Hamilton Tiger-Cats of the Canadian Football League (CFL) and spent the 1979 and 1980 seasons with the team. He spent two more years in the CFL with the Calgary Stampeders in 1981 and the Ottawa Rough Riders in 1982. In four CFL seasons Holland caught 149 passes for 2,532 yards and 10 touchdowns.
