= Charles Romes =

American football player (born 1954)

No. 26, 29, 27
- Position: Cornerback

Personal information
- Born: December 16, 1954 (age 71); Verdun, France
- Listed height: 6 ft 1 in (1.85 m)
- Listed weight: 191 lb (87 kg)

Career information
- High school: Hillside (NC)
- College: North Carolina Central
- NFL draft: 1977: 12th round, 309th overall pick

Career history
- Buffalo Bills (1977–1986); San Diego Chargers (1987); Seattle Seahawks (1987)

Career NFL statistics
- Interceptions: 28
- Fumble recoveries: 8
- Touchdowns: 2
- Stats at Pro Football Reference

Charles Michael Romes (born December 16, 1954) was an American football cornerback in the National Football League (NFL), primarily for the Buffalo Bills. He played college football at North Carolina Central University. Romes's 137 total starts with Buffalo are 8th-most in team history. He is distinguished as being the first French man to play in the NFL.

== Professional career ==
Romes played for the Bills for a total of ten seasons, playing in every game for the Bills from his rookie season to 1986, starting every game from 1978 forward. Romes logged at least one interception in every year from 1978 to 1986; his 28 career interceptions are fourth in team history. In Week Two of his second season, Romes returned an interception 85 yards for a touchdown against the New York Jets.

Romes played five games with the San Diego Chargers in 1987.
