= Dee Hardison =

American football player (1956–2018)

No. 74, 79, 92, 93
- Positions: Defensive end, defensive tackle

Personal information
- Born: May 2, 1956; Jacksonville, North Carolina, U.S.
- Died: April 21, 2018 (aged 61); Chapel Hill, North Carolina, U.S.
- Listed height: 6 ft 4 in (1.93 m)
- Listed weight: 274 lb (124 kg)

Career information
- High school: Hobbton (Newton Grove, North Carolina)
- College: North Carolina
- NFL draft: 1978: 2nd round, 32nd overall pick

Career history
- Buffalo Bills (1978–1980); New York Giants (1981–1985); San Diego Chargers (1986–1987); Kansas City Chiefs (1988)

Awards and highlights
- PFWA All-Rookie Team (1978); Consensus All-American (1977); 2× First-team All-ACC (1976, 1977); North Carolina Tar Heels Jersey No. 71 honored

Career NFL statistics
- Sacks: 17
- Fumble recoveries: 2
- Stats at Pro Football Reference

William David "Dee" Hardison (May 2, 1956 – April 21, 2018) was an American professional football player who was a defensive end and defensive tackle in the National Football League (NFL) for the Buffalo Bills (1978–1980), New York Giants (1982–1985), San Diego Chargers (1986–1987) and Kansas City Chiefs (1988). He played college football for the North Carolina Tar Heels.

Hardison helped the Bills win the 1980 AFC East Division and helped the Bills defense lead the NFL in fewest passing yards allowed in 1978 and the AFC in 1979 and 1980 and NFL in fewest total yards allowed in 1980 and the Chiefs lead the NFL in fewest passing yards allowed in 1988.

In ten seasons, Hardison had nine sacks.

Hardison died on April 21, 2018, at the age of 61.
