= Ken Jones (American football) =

American football player (born 1952)

No. 69, 73, 72
- Position: Tackle

Personal information
- Born: December 1, 1952 (age 73); St. Louis, Missouri, U.S.
- Listed height: 6 ft 5 in (1.96 m)
- Listed weight: 260 lb (118 kg)

Career information
- High school: Pattonville
- College: Arkansas State
- NFL draft: 1976: 2nd round, 45th overall pick

Career history
- Buffalo Bills (1976–1986); New York Jets (1987)

Awards and highlights
- First-team All-American (1975)

Career NFL statistics
- Games played: 163
- Games started: 141
- Fumble recoveries: 8
- Stats at Pro Football Reference

Kenneth Eugene Jones (born December 1, 1952) is an American former professional football player who was an offensive lineman for the Buffalo Bills and New York Jets of the National Football League (NFL). He played high-school football at Pattonville High School and college football for the Arkansas State Red Wolves. Jones served as a head football coach at LaSalle High School in Niagara Falls, New York for several years.
