= Danny Fulton =

American football player (born 1956)

No. 80, 86, 84
- Position: Wide receiver

Personal information
- Born: September 2, 1956 (age 70); Memphis, Tennessee, U.S.
- Listed height: 6 ft 2 in (1.88 m)
- Listed weight: 184 lb (83 kg)

Career information
- High school: Technical (Omaha, Nebraska)
- College: Nebraska, Nebraska–Omaha
- NFL draft: 1978: 3rd round, 65th overall pick

Career history
- Buffalo Bills (1978-1979); Cleveland Browns (1981–1982)

Awards and highlights
- Super Bowl champion (XIX)

Career NFL statistics
- Receptions: 5
- Receiving yards: 81
- Stats at Pro Football Reference

Danny Fulton (born September 2, 1956) is an American former professional football player who was a wide receiver in the National Football League (NFL). He played for the Buffalo Bills in 1979 and for the Cleveland Browns from 1981 to 1982.
