= Keith Moody =

American football player and coach (born 1953)

No. 21, 26, 46
- Position: Defensive back

Personal information
- Born: June 13, 1953 (age 73); Salisbury, North Carolina, U.S.
- Listed height: 5 ft 11 in (1.80 m)
- Listed weight: 171 lb (78 kg)

Career information
- High school: Nottingham (NY)
- College: Syracuse
- NFL draft: 1976: 10th round, 280th overall pick

Career history

Playing
- Buffalo Bills (1976–1979); Oakland Raiders (1980); New Jersey Generals (1983)

Coaching
- Brockport (1983–1985) Head coach

Awards and highlights
- Super Bowl champion (XV)

Career NFL statistics
- Interceptions: 3
- Fumble recoveries: 4
- Touchdowns: 3
- Stats at Pro Football Reference

Keith M. Moody (born June 13, 1953) is an American former professional football player who was a defensive back in the National Football League (NFL). He played college football for the Syracuse Orange and was selected by the Buffalo Bills in the 10th round of the 1976 NFL draft.

Moody also played for the Oakland Raiders and earned a Super Bowl ring with them in Super Bowl XV. He finished his career in 1983 with the USFL's New Jersey Generals. He is also a member of the Syracuse Sports Hall of Fame.

Recently Moody has been working at the MVLA High School District, where he is now an executive.

In 2013, Moody left his principal position at Mountain View High School to teach adult education and he retired in 2017.

== Head coaching record ==
Year	Team	Overall	Conference	Standing	Bowl/playoffs
Brockport Golden Eagles (NCAA Division III independent) (1983–1985)
1983	Brockport	0–10			
1984	Brockport	1–8			
1985	Brockport	1–9–1			
Brockport:		2–27–1			
Total:		2–27–1			
