= Mario Clark =

American football player (born 1954)

No. 29
- Position: Cornerback

Personal information
- Born: March 29, 1954 (age 72); Pasadena, California, U.S.
- Listed height: 6 ft 2 in (1.88 m)
- Listed weight: 194 lb (88 kg)

Career information
- High school: Pasadena (CA)
- College: Oregon
- NFL draft: 1976: 1st round, 18th overall pick

Career history
- Buffalo Bills (1976–1983); San Francisco 49ers (1984)

Awards and highlights
- Super Bowl champion (XIX); PFWA All-Rookie Team (1976); First-team All-Pac-8 (1975)

Career NFL statistics
- Interceptions: 26
- INT yards: 438
- Fumble recoveries: 3
- Sacks: 1
- Games played: 126
- Stats at Pro Football Reference

Mario Sean Clark (born March 29, 1954) is an American former professional football player who played as a cornerback for the Buffalo Bills and San Francisco 49ers in the National Football League (NFL). He played college football at the University of Oregon.

While playing with the Bills, Clark recorded 25 NFL interceptions by the age of 27. He added just one more interception for the remainder of his career, finishing with a total of 26 interceptions. Clark won a Super Bowl championship in 1984 as a member of the San Francisco 49ers in Super Bowl XIX.
