= Jim Wagstaff =

American football player and coach (1936–2010)

No. 49, 22
- Position: Safety

Personal information
- Born: June 12, 1936; American Falls, Idaho, U.S.
- Died: September 28, 2010 (aged 74); Idaho Falls, Idaho, U.S.
- Listed height: 6 ft 2 in (1.88 m)
- Listed weight: 192 lb (87 kg)

Career information
- High school: American Falls
- College: Idaho State
- NFL draft: 1958: 21st round, 253rd overall pick

Career history

Playing
- Detroit Lions (1958-1959)*; Chicago Cardinals (1959); Buffalo Bills (1960–1961)
- * Offseason or practice squad member only

Coaching
- Boise State (1969–1972) Defensive coordinator; Los Angeles Rams (1973–1977) Defensive backfield coach; Buffalo Bills (1978–1980) Defensive backfield coach; San Diego Chargers (1981–1985) Defensive backfield coach

Awards and highlights
- Second-team All-AFL (1960); All-RMC (1957)

Career AFL statistics
- Interceptions: 9
- Touchdowns: 1
- Stats at Pro Football Reference

Jim Wagstaff (June 12, 1936 — September 28, 2010) was an American professional football player and coach. He played as a safety in the National Football League (NFL) and the American Football League (AFL). He was later an assistant coach.

Wagstaff played college football for Idaho State Bengals. He played in the NFL for the Chicago Cardinals before joining the AFL's Buffalo Bills. He earned second-team All-AFL honors in 1960. After his playing career, he was a defensive coordinator in college for the Boise State Broncos before becoming a secondary coach in the NFL for the Los Angeles Rams, Buffalo Bills, and San Diego Chargers

== Early life ==
Wagstaff was born and grew up in American Falls, Idaho and attended American Falls High School.

== College career ==
Wagstaff was a member of the Idaho State Bengals for four seasons, joining the team as a walk-on. He played quarterback, halfback and defensive back. He was named All-Rocky Mountain Conference as a senior. Wagstaff was also a four-year member of the Idaho State track team.

== Professional career ==
Wagstaff was selected in the 21st round of the 1958 NFL draft by the Detroit Lions but was cut during training camp. He took a high school coaching position in Idaho and was invited to Lions camp for a second straight season but was cut a second time after suffering a knee injury. Wagstaff was teaching until was signed by the Chicago Cardinals in November of the 1959 season after the team suffered numerous injuries at the defensive back position and played in two games. He was re-signed by the Cardinals at the end of the season, but was cut on August 1, 1960.

Shortly after being released by the Cardinals, Wagstaff was signed by the Buffalo Bills of the newly-formed American Football League. Wagstaff was named All-AFL in his first season with the Bills after intercepting six passes and returning one for a touchdown. He intercepted three passes in 1961. Wagstaff retired from playing football after suffering a severe injury during training camp in 1962.

== Coaching career and later life ==
After his playing career ended, Wagstaff earned a master's degree in education from Utah State University. After teaching and coaching football at Pocatello High and then Idaho Falls High, he was hired as the defensive coordinator at Boise State. Wagstaff was hired as the Los Angeles Rams defensive backs coach in 1973. He was hired by the Bills in 1978, where he remained until he was hired away by the San Diego Chargers in 1981. After leaving coaching Wagstaff moved back to Idaho before moving to Kenai, Alaska, where he became the head football coach at Kenai Central High School. Wagstaff died on September 28, 2010.
