= Jeff Nixon =

American football player (born 1956)

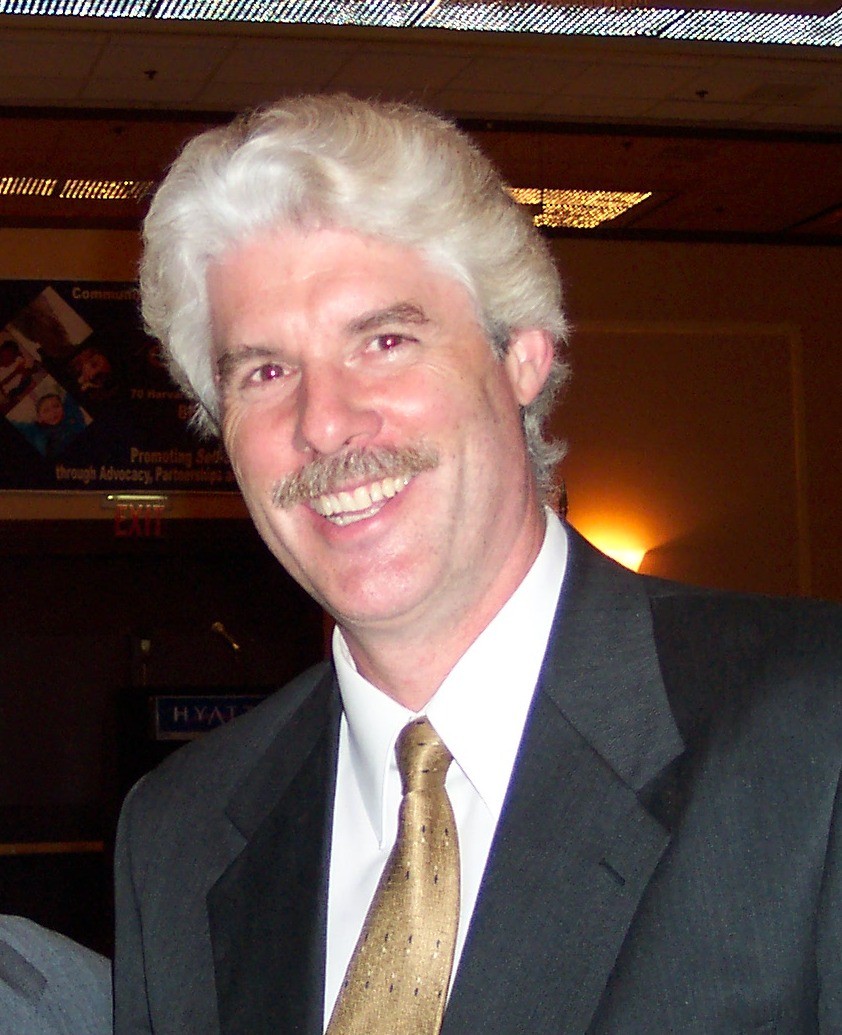

No. 38
- Position: Defensive back

Personal information
- Born: October 13, 1956 (age 70); Fürstenfeldbruck, West Germany
- Listed height: 6 ft 3 in (1.91 m)
- Listed weight: 190 lb (86 kg)

Career information
- High school: Gar-Field Senior (Woodbridge, Virginia, U.S.)
- College: Richmond
- NFL draft: 1979: 4th round, 87th overall pick

Career history
- Buffalo Bills (1979–1984)

Awards and highlights
- Consensus All-American (1978); Third-team All-American (1976)

Career NFL statistics
- Interceptions: 11
- Fumble recoveries: 1
- Touchdowns: 1
- Stats at Pro Football Reference

Jeffry Allen Nixon (born October 13, 1956) is an American former college and professional football player who was a defensive back in the National Football League (NFL) for six seasons during the 1970s and 1980s. He played college football at the University of Richmond, and was recognized as an All-American. He later played for the NFL's Buffalo Bills.

== Early life ==
Nixon was born in Fürstenfeldbruck, Germany. He attended Gar-Field Senior High School in Prince William County, Virginia.

== College career ==
Nixon attended the University of Richmond in Richmond, Virginia, where he played for the Richmond Spiders football team from 1975 to 1978. As a senior in 1978, he was recognized as a consensus first-team All-American. Nixon recorded twenty-three interceptions and remains seventh in career interceptions in NCAA Division I-A history.

== Professional career ==
The Buffalo Bills chose Nixon in the fourth round (eighty-seventh pick overall) of the 1979 NFL draft, and he played for the Bills from 1979 to 1984. He led the team with six interceptions in his rookie year. In 1980, he was the Sports Illustrated Defensive Player of the Month for September. He set a club record with four takeaways in one game (three interceptions, one fumble recovery) versus the Miami Dolphins in 1980 to help the Bills snap a 20-game losing streak against Miami. Nixon suffered a career-ending knee injury in 1984.

== TV appearances ==
Nixon appeared on the 1978 College Football All-America Team with Bob Hope.

== Life after football ==
During the Buffalo Bills football season, Nixon worked as a sports analyst on WKBW-TV's AM Buffalo from 2002 to 2008. He also hosted an internet radio show "The Jeff Nixon Sports Report" that aired from 2008 to 2009 on VoiceAmerica. From 2009 to 2011 he wrote and published articles on the blog "Fourth and Goal Unites." Jeff was the official blogger for the NFL Alumni Association from 2011 to 2012. He has worked for the past 20 years (2000-2019) as the Youth Employment Director for the City of Buffalo. Jeff has been tireless in informing players of their rights with medical benefits, pension, and concussion issues on a blog called "NFL RETIRED PLAYERS UNITED".

Nixon was voted the Buffalo Nightlife Magazine 2006, 2007 and 2008 R&B guitar player of the year.

He has two children from his first marriage, Jeff Nixon, Jr. and Jena. And is married to the singer Joyce Wilson Nixon.
