= Steve Freeman (American football) =

American football player (born 1953)

No. 22
- Position: Safety

Personal information
- Born: May 8, 1953 (age 73); Lamesa, Texas, U.S.
- Listed height: 5 ft 11 in (1.80 m)
- Listed weight: 185 lb (84 kg)

Career information
- High school: Whitehaven (Memphis, Tennessee)
- College: Mississippi State
- NFL draft: 1975: 5th round, 117th overall pick

Career history
- New England Patriots (1975)*; Buffalo Bills (1975–1986); Minnesota Vikings (1987)
- * Offseason or practice squad member only

Career NFL statistics
- Interceptions: 23
- Fumble recoveries: 8
- Defensive TDs: 3
- Stats at Pro Football Reference

Steven Jay Freeman (born May 8, 1953) is an American former professional football player who was a defensive back in the National Football League (NFL). After his playing career, he became an NFL game official.

Freeman played college football for the Mississippi State Bulldogs, leading them in interceptions during the 1973 and 1974 seasons. He was later named as one of the Southeastern Conference Football Legends.

He was selected by the NFL's New England Patriots in the fifth round of the 1975 NFL draft with the 117th overall pick. However, he was released by the Patriots before the start of the regular season, and eventually signed with the Buffalo Bills. Freeman spent 12 seasons with Buffalo, compiling 23 career interceptions and three touchdowns. In the 1980 season, he intercepted seven passes for 107 yards and one touchdown. He spent his last NFL season, 1987, with the Minnesota Vikings after being traded by the Bills.

After retiring as a player, Freeman became an American football official, working in college football's Southeastern Conference and NFL Europe before joining the NFL in 2001 as a back judge. As an official, he wears uniform number 133 and is on the officiating crew headed by referee Alex Kemp.

One of Freeman's teammates in Buffalo was linebacker Jim Haslett, who later became head coach of the New Orleans Saints. Although the two were teammates for seven seasons, Freeman was not prohibited from working Saints' games during Haslett's tenure (2001–05; Haslett's first season was 2000), nor St. Louis Rams games during Haslett's stint as interim coach in 2008. While in the SEC, Freeman was prohibited from working Mississippi State games, as league rules do not allow officials to work games involving any school which they attended.

Freeman resides in Mississippi, is married and has three children. Freeman's son, Brad, was a four-year letterman on the Mississippi State baseball team and helped the Bulldogs reach the College World Series in 1997 and 1998, and in 2014, he was hired to join the NFL as a field judge after serving as a field judge in the SEC. Brad Freeman, who wears uniform No. 88, was the field judge for the 2015 playoff game between the Seattle Seahawks and Vikings at TCF Bank Stadium, where the kickoff temperature of −6 °F (−3 °C) made it the third coldest game in NFL history.

Freeman chose to opt out of the 2020 NFL season due to the COVID-19 pandemic.
