= Willie Parker (offensive lineman) =

American football player (born 1948)

No. 56, 61
- Position: Center

Personal information
- Born: December 28, 1948 (age 77); Baytown, Texas, U.S.
- Listed height: 6 ft 3 in (1.91 m)
- Listed weight: 245 lb (111 kg)

Career information
- High school: Wharton (TX)
- College: North Texas
- NFL draft: 1971: 3rd round, 75th overall pick

Career history
- San Francisco 49ers (1971–1972)*; Buffalo Bills (1973–1979); Detroit Lions (1980)
- * Offseason or practice squad member only

Career NFL statistics
- Games played: 94
- Games started: 47
- Stats at Pro Football Reference

William Nolen Parker (born December 28, 1948) is an American former professional football player who was a center for 11 seasons in the National Football League (NFL) for the San Francisco 49ers, Buffalo Bills and Detroit Lions. He played college football for the North Texas Mean Green.

== North Texas University ==
Parker played college football at North Texas University. While playing at North Texas, Will made All Missouri Valley Conference in 1969 and 1970. In 2013 Will was voted as the Center for the North Texas All Century Team (1913–2013). In 2016 the North Texas Hall of Fame committee voted Will into the North Texas Hall of Fame.

== San Francisco 49ers ==
Parker was originally drafted 75th overall in the third round by the San Francisco 49ers in the 1971 NFL draft. He made the Taxi Squad and participated in all practices for the entire season.

== Buffalo Bills ==
Parker was traded to Buffalo in 1973 as a snapper, center and backup guard. He played eight years for the Bills. In 1976, going into his fourth year with the Buffalo Bills, Parker became their starting center. Despite a strong middle of the offensive line with Parker flanking left guard Reggie McKenzie and Hall-of-Fame right guard Joe DeLamielleure in all 14 games, that team had a 3-11 won-lost record, the offense scoring only 160 points (11.4 points/game), 26th among 28 teams in the NFL. In 1977 OJ Simpson Buffalo's outstanding running back '77 season in Buffalo was cut short by injury. Before the 1978 season, the Bills traded OJ Simpson to the San Francisco 49ers for a series of draft picks.[18] Willie played three seasons with the team's fortune improving to 5–11 in 1978 and 7–9 in 1979, the first two years with Chuck Knox as the head coach, the same linemen trio up the middle in all 16 games during three years. However, in the following year, Parker was traded to the Detroit Lions to help in rebuilding Detroit's offensive line.

== Detroit Lions ==
In 1980, his final year in the NFL, Parker went to the Detroit Lions, starting only once in 4 games, as a career-ending injury occurred in his final game against the Chicago Bears. Willie came back to the Detroit Lions in 1981 Training Camp and due to work related issue, decided to retire. In all Willie spent 11 years in the NFL.
