= Mike Collier (American football) =

American football player (1953–2025)

No. 44, 35
- Position: Running back

Personal information
- Born: September 21, 1953; Baltimore, Maryland, U.S.
- Died: February 16, 2025 (aged 71); Hagerstown, Maryland, U.S.
- Listed height: 5 ft 11 in (1.80 m)
- Listed weight: 200 lb (91 kg)

Career information
- High school: Edmondson-Westside (Edmondson Village, Baltimore)
- College: Morgan State
- NFL draft: 1975: 14th round, 364th overall pick

Career history
- Pittsburgh Steelers (1975–1976); Buffalo Bills (1977–1979)

Awards and highlights
- Super Bowl champion (X)

Career NFL statistics
- Rushing attempts: 86
- Rushing yards: 370
- Receptions: 11
- Receiving yards: 73
- Total touchdowns: 6
- Stats at Pro Football Reference

Michael Jerome Collier (September 21, 1953 – February 16, 2025) was an American professional football player who was a running back in the National Football League (NFL). He played college football for the Morgan State Bears. He played in the NFL for the Pittsburgh Steelers for two seasons and three with the Buffalo Bills.

As an NFL rookie in 1975, Collier scored three rushing touchdowns while the Steelers went on to win Super Bowl X. He spent the 1976 season on injured reserve (during which he taught physical education at the Talmudical Academy - Yeshiva Chofetz Chaim in Baltimore, Maryland) before signing with the Bills the following year.

Collier resided in Hagerstown, Maryland, with his three children, his wife Lisa, six grandchildren, and worked at a local Martin's grocery store as a manager.

Collier died in Hagerstown on February 16, 2025, at the age of 71.
