= Connie Zelencik =

American football player (1955–2021)

No. 53
- Position: Center

Personal information
- Born: May 13, 1955; Calumet City, Illinois, U.S.
- Died: May 22, 2021 (aged 66); Dyer, Indiana, U.S.
- Listed height: 6 ft 4 in (1.93 m)
- Listed weight: 245 lb (111 kg)

Career information
- High school: Calumet City (IL) Thornton Fractional North
- College: Purdue
- NFL draft: 1977: 11th round, 249th overall pick

Career history
- Chicago Bears (1977)*; Buffalo Bills (1977–1979); Chicago Bears (1980)*
- * Offseason or practice squad member only

Awards and highlights
- First-team All-Big Ten (1976)

Career NFL statistics
- Games played: 14
- Stats at Pro Football Reference

Conrad James "Connie" Zelencik (May 13, 1955 – May 22, 2021) was an American professional football player who was a center for the Buffalo Bills of the National Football League (NFL) in 1977. He died on May 22, 2021, in Dyer, Indiana, at age 66.
