= Mike Kadish =

American football player (1950–2023)

No. 72, 71
- Position: Defensive tackle

Personal information
- Born: May 27, 1950; Grand Rapids, Michigan, U.S.
- Died: March 19, 2023 (aged 72)
- Listed height: 6 ft 5 in (1.96 m)
- Listed weight: 270 lb (122 kg)

Career information
- High school: Catholic Central (Grand Rapids)
- College: Notre Dame
- NFL draft: 1972: 1st round, 25th overall pick

Career history
- Miami Dolphins (1972)*; Buffalo Bills (1973–1981)
- * Offseason or practice squad member only

Awards and highlights
- All-American (1971)

Career NFL statistics
- Sacks: 30.5
- Fumble recoveries: 5
- Defensive TDs: 1
- Stats at Pro Football Reference

Michael Scott Kadish (May 27, 1950 – March 19, 2023) was an American professional football player who was a defensive lineman for nine seasons in the National Football League (NFL) for the Miami Dolphins and Buffalo Bills. He played college football for the Notre Dame Fighting Irish. He was named an All-American in 1971 as a senior. He was the Miami Dolphins' first round draft pick in 1972, and spent the 1972 season on the Dolphins's taxi squad as the team won Super Bowl VII while going undefeated. He was traded to the Bills prior to the 1973 season in exchange for offensive lineman Irv Goode.

Kadish died on March 19, 2023, at the age of 72.
