= Joe Shipp =

American football player (born 1955)

No. 87
- Position: Tight end

Personal information
- Born: June 25, 1955 (age 71); Long Beach, California, U.S.
- Listed height: 6 ft 4 in (1.93 m)
- Listed weight: 225 lb (102 kg)

Career information
- High school: Carson (Carson, California)
- College: USC
- NFL draft: 1978: undrafted

Career history
- Buffalo Bills (1978–1979)

Career NFL statistics
- Receptions: 3
- Receiving yards: 43
- Touchdowns: 1
- Stats at Pro Football Reference

Joseph Delano Shipp (born June 25, 1955) is an American former professional football player who was a tight end for the Buffalo Bills of the National Football League (NFL). He played college football for the USC Trojans.
