= Steve Powell (gridiron football) =

American football player (born 1956)

No. 23
- Position: Running back

Personal information
- Born: January 2, 1956 (age 70); St. Louis, Missouri, U.S.
- Listed height: 5 ft 11 in (1.80 m)
- Listed weight: 186 lb (84 kg)

Career information
- High school: Kirkwood
- College: Truman State
- NFL draft: 1978: 7th round, 183rd overall pick

Career history
- Buffalo Bills (1978–1979); Hamilton Tiger-Cats (1980); Philadelphia Eagles (1981)*; New York Jets (1982)*; New Jersey Generals (1983)
- * Offseason or practice squad member only

Career NFL statistics
- Rushing attempts: 10
- Rushing yards: 29
- Stats at Pro Football Reference

Steven Orville Powell (born January 2, 1956) is an American former professional football player who was a running back for the Buffalo Bills of the National Football League (NFL). He played college football for the Truman State University. He also played professionally for the Hamilton Tiger-Cats of the Canadian Football League (CFL).
