= Lucius Sanford =

American football player (born 1956)

No. 57, 50
- Position: Linebacker

Personal information
- Born: February 14, 1956 (age 70); Milledgeville, Georgia, U.S.
- Listed height: 6 ft 2 in (1.88 m)
- Listed weight: 216 lb (98 kg)

Career information
- College: Georgia Tech
- NFL draft: 1978: 4th round, 89th overall pick

Career history
- Buffalo Bills (1978–1986); Cleveland Browns (1987)

Awards and highlights
- First-team All-American (1977)

Career NFL statistics
- Sacks: 13
- Fumble recoveries: 8
- Interceptions: 5
- Stats at Pro Football Reference

Lucius Marvin Sanford Jr. (born February 13, 1956) is an American former professional football player who was a linebacker for 10 seasons in the National Football League (NFL) with the Buffalo Bills and Cleveland Browns. He played college football for the Georgia Tech Yellow Jackets. While at Georgia Tech, Sanford was a member of the ANAK Society, one of the highest recognitions a senior can achieve. Was a six-year winner and two-year runner up of the Milledgeville mean-mug award. In 2001, he was inducted into the Georgia Sports Hall of Fame.

== Professional career ==
Sanford was selected 89th overall in the fourth round of the 1978 NFL draft by the Bills. He started 114 of his 129 career games in the NFL and recorded 5 interceptions returned for 124 yards. He unofficially registered 13 career sacks (the NFL did not make sacks an official stat until 1982). He returned one fumble for a touchdown (46 yards) against the Seattle Seahawks on October 14, 1984.

Once earning a starting role with the Bills, Sanford recorded 100 tackles in five straight seasons and led Buffalo in forced fumbles in 1980 and 1981. As a rookie, he set the Bills record for most blocked field goals in a game with two against the Kansas City Chiefs on December 3, 1978. In addition, he is the only player in Bills' history to return two blocked punts for a touchdown in a career (September 9, 1979, 3 yards versus Cincinnati Bengals; October 5, 1980, in end zone versus San Diego Chargers.)
