= Las Vegas Raiders all-time roster =

1,431 players have appeared in at least one regular season or postseason game in the National Football League (NFL) or American Football League (AFL) for the Las Vegas Raiders franchise since 1960. This list is accurate through the end of the 2025 NFL season.

== A ==
- Ameer Abdullah
- Johnathan Abram
- Rick Ackerman
- Davante Adams
- Jamal Adams
- Phillip Adams
- Sam Adams
- Stan Adams
- Stefon Adams
- Tyrell Adams
- James Adkisson
- Ben Agajanian
- Nelson Agholor
- Carl Aikens, Jr.
- Elijah Alexander
- Lorenzo Alexander
- Mike Alexander
- Vadal Alexander
- Jay Alford
- Dakota Allen
- Dalva Allen
- Eric Allen
- Jackie Allen
- Marcus Allen
- Nate Allen
- Jon Alston
- Lyle Alzado
- David Amerson
- Vincent Amey
- Courtney Anderson
- Eddie Anderson
- Marques Anderson
- Chigozie Anusiem
- Leo Araguz
- Dan Archer
- Ray Armstrong
- Ray-Ray Armstrong
- Trace Armstrong
- Damon Arnette
- Doug Asad
- Larry Asante
- Darryl Ashmore
- Joe Aska
- Nnamdi Asomugha
- Marcell Ateman
- Larry Atkins
- Pervis Atkins
- George Atkinson
- George Atkinson III
- David Ausberry
- Denico Autry
- Anthony Averett

== B ==
- Alex Bachman
- Brad Badger
- Chris Bahr
- Rashad Baker
- Eric Ball
- Jerry Ball
- Neiron Ball
- Pete Banaszak
- Estes Banks
- Warren Bankston
- Al Bansavage
- Joe Barbee
- Peyton Barber
- Joe Barksdale
- Rod Barksdale
- Jeff Barnes
- Khalif Barnes
- Larry Barnes
- Rodrigo Barnes
- Malcolm Barnwell
- Jan Barrett
- Alex Bars
- Ron Bartell
- Rich Bartlewski
- Eric Barton
- Jackson Barton
- Daren Bates
- Patrick Bates
- Vic Beasley
- Jack Bech
- Kevin Belcher
- Anthony Bell
- Greg Bell
- Joe Bell
- Nick Bell
- Brian Belway
- Wes Bender
- Jakorian Bennett
- Michael Bennett
- Duane Benson
- Thomas Benson
- Bené Benwikere
- Tony Bergstrom
- Rick Berns
- Rufus Bess
- Don Bessillieu
- Steve Beuerlein
- Greg Biekert
- Fred Biletnikoff
- Andrew Billings
- Christo Bilukidi
- Rodger Bird
- Dan Birdwell
- Sonny Bishop
- Barry Black
- Saeed Blacknall
- Darryl Blackstock
- George Blanda
- Greg Blankenship
- Jacob Bobenmoyer
- Brandon Bolden
- Kyle Boller
- Curtis Bolton
- Rik Bonness
- Devontae Booker
- Thomas Booker
- Kevin Boothe
- Kevin Boss
- Tashawn Bower
- Brock Bowers
- Nick Bowers
- John Bowie
- NaVorro Bowman
- Greg Boyd
- Jerome Boyd
- Max Boydston
- George Boynton
- Cary Brabham
- Greg Bracelin
- Morris Bradshaw
- Calvin Branch
- Cliff Branch
- Tyvon Branch
- Alex Bravo
- Tyler Brayton
- Jim Breech
- Jim Brewington
- Jeremy Brigham
- Mike Brisiel
- Mason Brodine
- Lorenzo Bromell
- Aaron Brooks
- Bobby Brooks
- Bucky Brooks
- Willie Broughton
- Bob Brown
- Brittain Brown
- Charles Brown
- Derek Brown
- Doug Brown
- Fadol Brown
- Jayon Brown
- Larry Brown
- Pharaoh Brown
- Preston Brown
- Ricky Brown
- Ron Brown (born 1961)
- Ron Brown (born 1964)
- Stevie Brown
- Tarell Brown
- Tim Brown
- Trent Brown
- Vincent Brown
- Willie Brown
- Jim Browne
- Keith Browner
- Dave Browning
- Aundray Bruce
- Larry Brunson
- Desmond Bryant
- Harrison Bryant
- Martavis Bryant
- Tony Bryant
- Warren Bryant
- Ray Buchanan
- Phillip Buchanon
- Will Buchanon
- Bob Buczkowski
- Bill Budness
- George Buehler
- Drew Buie
- Jarrod Bunch
- Jerry Burch
- Vontaze Burfict
- Derrick Burgess
- Kaelin Burnett
- Kevin Burnett
- Amari Burney
- Miles Burris
- Ron Burton
- Michael Bush
- Matt Bushman
- Paul Butcher
- Adam Butler
- Brice Butler
- Darien Butler
- Matthew Butler
- Darryl Byrd

== C ==
- Jason Cabinda
- Tony Caldwell
- Rick Calhoun
- Shilique Calhoun
- Austin Calitro
- Rich Camarillo
- Bruce Campbell
- Jason Campbell
- Joe Campbell
- Stan Campbell
- Joe Cannavino
- Billy Cannon
- Alex Cappa
- Cooper Carlisle
- Daniel Carlson
- Chetti Carr
- Chris Carr
- Derek Carr
- Cornellius Carradine
- T. J. Carrie
- Derek Carrier
- Darren Carrington
- Joe Carroll
- Andre Carter
- Andre Carter II
- DeAndre Carter
- Louis Carter
- Perry Carter
- Russell Carter
- Zachary Carter
- Rock Cartwright
- Chance Casey
- Kerry Cash
- Dave Casper
- Carmen Cavalli
- Mario Celotto
- K'Lavon Chaisson
- Bob Chandler
- Jamar Chaney
- Ted Chapman
- Mike Charles
- Chimdi Chekwa
- Raymond Chester
- Jeremy Chinn
- Todd Christensen
- Brad Christenson
- Donnis Churchwell
- Danny Clark
- John Clay
- Keenan Clayton
- T. J. Clemmings
- Chris Clemons
- Tony Cline
- Ha Ha Clinton-Dix
- AJ Cole III
- Keelan Cole
- Kenyon Coleman
- Rod Coleman
- Chris Collier
- Kerry Collins
- Maliek Collins
- Mo Collins
- Neal Colzie
- Derek Combs
- Will Compton
- Jon Condo
- Gareon Conley
- Dan Conners
- Brett Conway
- Connor Cook
- Jared Cook
- Bob Coolbaugh
- Amari Cooper
- Chris Cooper
- Earl Cooper
- Jarrod Cooper
- Marquis Cooper
- Joe Cormier
- Jack Cornell
- Dave Costa
- Joe Costello
- Lester Cotton
- James Cowser
- Michael Crabtree
- Dobie Craig
- Roger Craig
- Jack Crawford
- Juron Criner
- Zack Crockett
- Maxx Crosby
- Wayne Crow
- Derrick Crudup
- Daunte Culpepper
- Rick Cunningham
- Aaron Curry
- Ronald Curry

== D ==
- Dave Dalby
- Brad Daluiso
- Clem Daniels
- Dave Daniels
- Ben Davidson
- Cotton Davidson
- Bruce Davis (born 1956)
- Bruce Davis (born 1985)
- Clarence Davis
- Greg Davis
- James Davis
- Jamin Davis
- Jason Davis
- Mike Davis
- Scott Davis
- Trevor Davis
- Jerone Davison
- Divine Deablo
- Mike Dennery
- Andrew DePaola
- Jerry DePoyster
- Donald R. Deskins, Jr.
- Jordan Devey
- Andy Dickerson
- Eric Dickerson
- Eldridge Dickey
- Bo Dickinson
- John Diehl
- Gennaro DiNapoli
- John Dittrich
- Ernest Dixon
- Hewritt Dixon
- Rickey Dixon
- Torin Dorn
- Anthony Dorsett
- Dick Dorsey
- Keelan Doss
- Al Dotson
- Bob Dougherty
- Jonathan Dowling
- Ras-I Dowling
- Kenyan Drake
- Rickey Dudley
- Paul Dufault
- John Duff
- David Dunn
- Tim Dwight
- Mike Dyal
- Matt Dyson

== E ==
- Kony Ealy
- John Eason
- Omar Easy
- Adimchinobe Echemandu
- Bobby Joe Edmonds
- Terrell Edmunds
- Bryan Edwards
- Kalimba Edwards
- Lloyd Edwards
- Mario Edwards Jr.
- Tommy Eichenberg
- Mike Eischeid
- Isaiah Ekejiuba
- Craig Ellis
- Greg Ellis
- Jim Ellis
- Justin Ellis
- Glenn Ellison
- Riki Ellison
- Jermaine Eluemunor
- Kyle Emanuel
- Hunter Enis
- Bill Enyart
- Marcus Epps
- Hiram Eugene
- Vince Evans

== F ==
- Brandon Facyson
- Bill Fairband
- Justin Fargas
- Matthias Farley
- Neil Farrell Jr.
- Jon Feliciano
- Ron Fellows
- Derrick Fenner
- Mervyn Fernandez
- Clelin Ferrell
- Dan Ficca
- George Fields
- Yamon Figurs
- Bojay Filimoeatu
- Gary Finneran
- James FitzPatrick
- George Fleming
- Zeron Flemister
- Tom Flores
- Matt Flynn
- James Folston
- Cole Ford
- Jacoby Ford
- Stone Forsythe
- J. P. Foschi
- Ron Foster
- Cole Fotheringham
- Leki Fotu
- Coye Francies
- Carlos Francis
- Donald Frank
- Keith Franklin
- Elvis Franks
- Kavon Frazier
- Rob Fredrickson
- Mike Freeman
- Russell Freeman
- Charlie Frye
- David Fulcher
- Mondriel Fulcher
- Charley Fuller

== G ==
- Doug Gabriel
- Rico Gafford
- Thomas Gafford
- Amari Gainer
- Derrick Gainer
- Omar Gaither
- Chon Gallegos
- Robert Gallery
- Vincent Gamache
- Rich Gannon
- Bob Garner
- Charlie Garner
- Jimmy Garoppolo
- Carl Garrett
- Rashaan Gaulden
- Willie Gault
- Akbar Gbaja-Biamila
- Zach Gentry
- Jeff George
- John Gesek
- Claude Gibson
- Derrick Gibson
- Sean Gilbert
- Marcus Gilchrist
- Tyree Gillespie
- Fred Gillett
- Hubert Ginn
- Matt Giordano
- Thomas Gipson
- Delmar Glaze
- Mike Glennon
- Andrew Glover
- La'Roi Glover
- Travis Goethel
- Kevin Gogan
- Al Goldstein
- Bob Golic
- Rick Goltz
- Denzelle Good
- Darryl Goodlow
- Mike Goodson
- Alex Gordon
- Darrien Gordon
- Richard Gordon
- Jeff Gossett
- Sam Graddy
- Bruce Gradkowski
- Aaron Graham
- Derrick Graham
- Charles Grant
- DeLawrence Grant
- Ryan Grant
- Hroniss Grasu
- Rory Graves
- Dave Grayson
- Charlie Green
- Chaz Green
- Cornell Green
- David Greenwood
- Justin Griffith
- Phil Grimes
- Jake Grove
- Quentin Groves
- Javelin Guidry
- Greyson Gunheim
- Andre Gurode
- Sebastian Gutierrez
- Louis Guy
- Ray Guy

== H ==
- Spencer Hadley
- Derek Hagan
- Roger Hagberg
- DeAngelo Hall
- Leon Hall
- P.J. Hall
- Tim Hall
- Tyler Hall
- Willie Hall
- Antonio Hamilton
- Bobby Hamilton
- Johnathan Hankins
- Charley Hannah
- Joselio Hanson
- Mike Harden
- Cedrick Hardman
- Charlie Hardy
- David Hardy
- Lance Harkey
- Pat Harlow
- Duron Harmon
- Thomas Harper
- Dwayne Harris
- Erik Harris
- James Harris
- John Harris
- Johnnie Harris
- Kwame Harris
- Napoleon Harris
- Shelby Harris
- Dwight Harrison
- Nolan Harrison
- Rob Harrison
- Harold Hart
- Roy Hart
- Jahfari Harvey
- Jim Harvey
- Richard Harvey
- Don Hasselbeck
- James Hasty
- Keon Hatcher
- Clarence Hawkins
- Frank Hawkins
- Mike Hawkins
- Wayne Hawkins
- Anttaj Hawthorne
- D. J. Hayden
- Lester Hayes
- Mike Haynes
- Casey Hayward
- Jeff Heath
- Ben Heeney
- Don Heinrich
- Daniel Helm
- Roy Helu
- Tonka Hemingway
- John Henderson
- Mario Henderson
- Ted Hendricks
- Dick Hermann
- Ken Herock
- Justin Herron
- Jessie Hester
- Treyvon Hester
- Chris Hetherington
- Stephon Heyer
- Darrius Heyward-Bey
- Johnnie Lee Higgins
- Don Highsmith
- Rusty Hilger
- Greg Hill
- Kenny Hill
- Madre Hill
- Renaldo Hill
- Rod Hill
- Marcus Hinton
- I. M. Hipp
- Daryl Hobbs
- Nate Hobbs
- Billy Joe Hobert
- Al Hoisington
- Jamie Holland
- Jonathan Holland
- Donald Hollas
- Mack Hollins
- Jacob Hollister
- Brian Holloway
- Rob Holmberg
- Andre Holmes
- Darnay Holmes
- Lester Holmes
- Johnny Holton
- Elijah Hood
- Austin Hooper
- Jerry Hopkins
- Jesper Horsted
- Ethan Horton
- Derrick Hoskins
- Jeff Hostetler
- T. J. Houshmandzadeh
- Lamarr Houston
- Austin Howard
- Desmond Howard
- Thomas Howard
- Brian Hoyer
- Bobby Hoying
- Marv Hubbard
- John Huddleston
- Bob Hudson
- Rodney Hudson
- Michael Huff
- Corey Hulsey
- David Humm
- Ricky Hunley
- Jason Hunter
- Kevin Huntley
- Maurice Hurst Jr.
- Michael Husted

== I ==
- Carl Ihenacho
- Richie Incognito
- Alec Ingold
- Junior Ioane
- Gerald Irons
- Grant Irons
- Bruce Irvin
- David Irving
- Raghib Ismail

== J ==
- Bo Jackson
- Bobby Jackson
- Branden Jackson
- Brennan Jackson
- DeSean Jackson
- Gabe Jackson
- Grady Jackson
- Leonard Jackson
- Monte Jackson
- Rich Jackson
- Shedrick Jackson
- Steve Jackson
- Victor Jackson
- Josh Jacobs
- Proverb Jacobs
- Jeff Jaeger
- Harry Jagielski
- George Jakowenko
- Andre James
- Cory James
- Tory James
- Sebastian Janikowski
- Ed Jasper
- Ashton Jeanty
- Quinton Jefferson
- Jon Jelacic
- Greg Jenkins
- John Jenkins
- Mike Jenkins
- Robert Jenkins
- Ronney Jenkins
- Brandon Jennings
- Rashad Jennings
- Rick Jennings
- Derrick Jensen
- James Jett
- Arthur Jimerson
- Chris Johnson
- Derrick Johnson
- Eric Johnson
- Isaiah Johnson, American football cornerback
- Jakob Johnson
- Kevin Johnson
- Lonnie Johnson Jr.
- Monte Johnson
- Rob Johnson
- Shelton Johnson
- Teyo Johnson
- Tim Johnson
- Tyron Johnson
- Mark Johnston
- Lance Johnstone
- Doug Jolley
- Calvin Jones
- Chandler Jones
- Datone Jones
- David Jones
- Horace Jones
- Jack Jones
- James Jones
- Jim Jones
- Mike Jones
- Sean Jones
- Sidney Jones
- Taiwan Jones
- Willie Jones
- Zay Jones
- Maurice Jones-Drew
- Jaryd Jones-Smith
- Darin Jordan
- Dion Jordan
- LaMont Jordan
- Randy Jordan
- Shelby Jordan
- Karl Joseph
- William Joseph
- L. C. Joyner
- Lamarcus Joyner
- Trey Junkin

== K ==
- Nick Kasa
- Napoleon Kaufman
- Tom Keating
- Joe Kelly
- Kyu Blu Kelly
- Tommy Kelly
- Lincoln Kennedy
- Greg Kent
- Arden Key
- Bob Keyes
- Ramel Keyton
- Carl Kidd
- Jamie Kimmel
- Emanuel King
- Joe King
- Kenny King
- Linden King
- Marquette King
- Reggie Kinlaw
- Terry Kirby
- Denver Kirkland
- Dick Klein
- David Klingler
- Marcus Knight
- Pete Koch
- Dave Kocourek
- Warren Koegel
- Malcolm Koonce
- Kelvin Korver
- Walt Kowalczyk
- Ted Koy
- Joe Krakoski
- Bob Kruse
- Terry Kunz
- Ted Kwalick
- Nick Kwiatkoski
- Jeff Kysar

== L ==
- Jim Lachey
- Brandon LaFell
- Keenan Lambert
- Daryle Lamonica
- Emmanuel Lamur
- Dan Land
- Harvey Langi
- Ken Lanier
- Jack Larscheid
- Paul Larson
- Bill Laskey
- Ike Lassiter
- Darius Latham
- Greg Lathan
- Dylan Laube
- Jonah Laulu
- Henry Lawrence
- Larry Lawrence
- Nevin Lawson
- Luke Lawton
- Alex Leatherwood
- Dallin Leavitt
- Shane Lechler
- Marquel Lee
- Pat Lee
- ReShard Lee
- Zeph Lee
- Matt Leinart
- Brad Lekkerkerker
- Ashley Lelie
- Brian Leonhardt
- Chad Levitt
- Albert Lewis
- Bill Lewis
- Garry Lewis
- Hal Lewis (1935)
- Alva Liles
- Cody Lindenberg
- Cory Littleton
- Corey Liuget
- Doug Lloyd
- Tyler Lockett
- Wade Lockett
- Billy Ray Locklin
- Curtis Lofton
- James Lofton
- David Long
- Howie Long
- Daniel Loper
- J. P. Losman
- Billy Lott
- Ronnie Lott
- Tom Louderback
- Clarence Love
- Shalom Luani
- Ricky Lumpkin
- Lorenzo Lynch
- Marshawn Lynch
- Lamar Lyons

== M ==
- Dylan Mabin
- Khalil Mack
- Jacque MacKinnon
- Eddie Macon
- John Madsen
- Lamar Mady
- Atonio Mafi
- Erik Magnuson
- Kaluka Maiava
- Errol Mann
- Don Manoukian
- EJ Manuel
- Marv Marinovich
- Todd Marinovich
- Marcus Mariota
- Curt Marsh
- Terrace Marshall Jr.
- James Marten
- Doug Martin
- Nick Martin
- Rod Martin
- Tee Martin
- Blake Martinez
- Rich Martini
- Mickey Marvin
- Russell Maryland
- Lindsey Mason
- Luke Masterson
- Jeron Mastrud
- Archie Matsos
- Ira Matthews
- Alexander Mattison
- John Matuszak
- Kana'i Mauga
- Josh Mauro
- Tommy Maxwell
- Doug Mayberry
- Michael Mayer
- Benson Mayowa
- Taylor Mays
- Tyreik McAllister
- Joe McCall
- Napoleon McCallum
- Bryan McCann
- Matt McCants
- A. J. McCarron
- Rolando McClain
- Terrell McClain
- Randy McClanahan
- Kent McCloughan
- Milt McColl
- Tristin McCollum
- Sincere McCormick
- Josh McCown
- Gerald McCoy
- Larry McCoy
- Mike McCoy
- Matthew McCrane
- Demetrius McCray
- Terry McDaniel
- Clinton McDonald
- Dewey McDonald
- Dexter McDonald
- Tevin McDonald
- Reggie McElroy
- Vann McElroy
- Darren McFadden
- Marshall McFadden
- Walter McFadden
- Nyle McFarlane
- Chris McFoy
- Stacy McGee
- Keith McGill
- Chester McGlockton
- Matt McGloin
- Reggie McKenzie
- Odis McKinney
- Chris McLemore
- Herb McMath
- Raekwon McMillan
- Dan McMillen
- Jim McMillin
- Chuck McMurtry
- Paul McQuistan
- Charles McRae
- Dan Medlin
- Obi Melifonwu
- Rashaan Melvin
- Terry Mendenhall
- Mike Mercer
- Jordan Meredith
- Mark Merrill
- Jakobi Meyers
- Darren Mickell
- Terry Mickens
- Frank Middleton
- Matt Millen
- Alan Miller
- Bill Miller
- Justin Miller
- Kolton Miller
- Nick Miller
- Zach Miller
- John Henry Mills
- Charles Mincy
- Gene Mingo
- Gardner Minshew
- Dean Miraldi
- Rick Mirer
- Rex Mirich
- Bob Mischak
- Mike Mitchell
- Tom Mitchell
- Ron Mix
- Tre'von Moehrig
- Tim Moffett
- Mel Montalbo
- Cleo Montgomery
- Tyrone Montgomery
- Max Montoya
- Keith Moody
- Bob Moore
- Damontre Moore
- Denarius Moore
- Manfred Moore
- Sio Moore
- Johnnie Morant
- Foster Moreau
- Chris Morris
- Riley Morris
- Dave Morrison
- Kirk Morrison
- Nicholas Morrow
- Tommy Morrow
- Mike Morton
- Don Mosebar
- Jarvis Moss
- Randy Moss
- Winston Moss
- Rich Mostardi
- Raheem Mostert
- Mark Mraz
- Vance Mueller
- Calvin Muhammad
- Daniel Muir
- Trayvon Mullen
- Thayer Munford
- Ed Muransky
- Jesse Murdock
- Louis Murphy
- Justin Murray
- Latavius Murray
- Najee Mustafaa
- Netane Muti
- Brandon Myers
- Toby Myles

== N ==
- Keyon Nash
- Carl Nassib
- Nedu Ndukwe
- Joe Nedney
- Cory Nelms
- Bob Nelson
- J. J. Nelson
- Jordy Nelson
- Nick Nelson
- Reggie Nelson
- Jeremy Newberry
- Marshall Newhouse
- Anthony Newman
- Yannick Ngakoue
- Bilal Nichols
- Pete Nicklas
- Lucas Nix
- David Nixon
- Keisean Nixon
- Mike Noble
- Jim Norris
- Slade Norris
- Joe Novsek
- Mike Nugent

== O ==
- Carleton Oats
- Aidan O'Connell
- Dave Ogas
- Paul Oglesby
- Albert Okwuegbunam
- Jamize Olawale
- Chip Oliver
- Ryan O'Malley
- Patrick Omameh
- Oren O'Neal
- James Onwualu
- Patrick Onwuasor
- Leon Orr
- Chuck Osborne
- Clancy Osborne
- Kelechi Osemele
- Dwayne O'Steen
- Gus Otto
- Jim Otto
- Burgess Owens

== P ==
- Carson Palmer
- Nick Papac
- Dylan Parham
- Babe Parilli
- Andy Parker
- Brandon Parker
- Ron Parker
- Nathan Parks
- John Parrella
- Alex Parsons
- Tony Pashos
- Dan Pastorini
- Joel Patten
- Cordarrelle Patterson
- Elvis Patterson
- Mark Pattison
- Dave Pear
- Erik Pears
- Andrus Peat
- Todd Peat
- Rodney Peete
- JJ Pegues
- Kyle Peko
- Donald Penn
- Gerald Perry
- Mario Perry
- Denzel Perryman
- Nathan Peterman
- Marcus Peters
- Volney Peters
- Cal Peterson
- Charlie Phillips
- Irvin Phillips
- Jess Phillips
- Justin Phillips
- Darius Philon
- Charles Philyaw
- Bill Pickel
- Bruce Pickens
- Kenny Pickett
- Shurron Pierson
- Frank Pitts
- Jim Plunkett
- Isaiah Pola-Mao
- Quentin Poling
- Tyrone Poole
- Marquez Pope
- Darien Porter
- Jerry Porter
- Joe Porter
- Kerry Porter
- Tracy Porter
- Art Powell
- Charley Powell
- Warren Powers
- Jackson Powers-Johnson
- Germaine Pratt
- Gene Prebola
- Brian Price
- Dennis Price
- Troy Pride Jr.
- Anthony Prior
- Bob Prout
- Greg Pruitt
- Terrelle Pryor
- Will Putnam
- Palmer Pyle
- David Pyles

== Q ==
- Jeff Queen

== R ==
- Mike Rae
- Trey Ragas
- Derrick Ramsey
- Louis Rankin
- Tom Rathman
- Marcus Ray
- Dave Rayner
- J.R. Redmond
- Marcel Reece
- Malik Reed
- Archie Reese
- Shawn Regent
- Mike Reinfeldt
- Hunter Renfrow
- Billy Reynolds
- M.C. Reynolds
- Jon Rhattigan
- Dominic Rhodes
- Floyd Rice
- Harold Rice
- Jerry Rice
- Ken Rice
- Randy Rich
- Jalen Richard
- Decamerion Richardson
- Jay Richardson
- Desmond Ridder
- Louis Riddick
- Theo Riddick
- Ryan Riddle
- Preston Ridlehuber
- Chris Riehm
- Charlie Rieves
- Curtis Riley
- Perry Riley
- Andre Rison
- Jon Ritchie
- Hank Rivera
- Mychal Rivera
- Nick Roach
- Austin Robbins
- Barret Robbins
- Bo Roberson
- Cliff Roberts
- Elandon Roberts
- Seth Roberts
- Amik Robertson
- Nickell Robey
- Greg Robinson
- Janarius Robinson
- Jerry Robinson
- Johnny Robinson
- Ryan Robinson
- Terry Robiskie
- Isaac Rochell
- John Roderick
- Dominique Rodgers-Cromartie
- Mike Rodriguez
- Herb Roedel
- Caleb Rogers
- Carlos Rogers
- Jim Romano
- Bill Romanowski
- Bob Rosenstiel
- Brandian Ross
- Daniel Ross
- Jeremy Ross
- Tim Rother
- Stanford Routt
- Dave Rowe
- Karl Rubke
- Frostee Rucker
- Henry Ruggs III
- Carter Runyon
- Booker Russell
- Darrell Russell
- Gary Russell
- JaMarcus Russell

== S ==
- Ron Sabal
- Terdell Sands
- Brian Sanford
- O. J. Santiago
- Warren Sapp
- Samson Satele
- Matt Schaub
- Chaz Schilens
- Ray Schmautz
- Owen Schmitt
- Jay Schroeder
- Harry Schuh
- Stuart Schweigert
- Carey Scott
- Trevor Scott
- Sam Seale
- Paul Seiler
- Richard Seymour
- Siddeeq Shabazz
- David Sharpe
- Matt Shaughnessy
- Glenn Shaw
- Josh Shaw
- Terrance Shaw
- Kenny Shedd
- Brady Sheldon
- Art Shell
- John Samuel Shenker
- Lito Sheppard
- Rod Sherman
- Jackie Shipp
- George Shirkey
- Justin Shorter
- Mike Siani
- Trent Sieg
- Ian Silberman
- Nesta Jade Silvera
- Jordan Simmons
- Scott Simonson
- Jackie Simpson
- John Simpson
- Willie Simpson
- Barry Sims
- Pat Sims
- Otis Sistrunk
- Greg Skrepenak
- Chad Slaughter
- Richard Sligh
- Greg Slough
- Aldon Smith
- Anthony Smith
- Antonio Smith
- Bubba Smith
- Charlie Smith
- Chris Smith
- Christopher Smith
- Geno Smith
- Hal Smith
- J. D. Smith
- Jacquies Smith
- Jaylon Smith
- Jim Smith
- Jimmy Smith
- Keith Smith
- Kevin Smith
- Lee Smith
- Malcolm Smith
- Rod Smith
- Ron Smith
- Sean Smith
- Steve Smith
- Sutton Smith
- Travian Smith
- Willie Smith (born 1937)
- Willie Smith (born 1986)
- Willie Snead
- Charles Snowden
- Mike Sommer
- Vic So'oto
- Ollie Spencer
- Shawntae Spencer
- Robert Spillane
- Mike Spivey
- Damion Square
- Jack Squirek
- Ken Stabler
- Dave Stalls
- Duane Starks
- Fred Steinfort
- Kevin Stemke
- Richard Stephens
- Jeremy Stewart
- Joe Stewart
- Tony Stewart
- Jarrett Stidham
- Matt Stinchcomb
- Eric Stokes
- Jack Stone
- James Stone
- John Stone
- Ron Stone
- Dillon Stoner
- Steve Strachan
- Rod Streater
- Bill Striegel
- Darrell Strong
- Dana Stubblefield
- Bob Svihus
- D. J. Swearinger
- Steve Sweeney
- Pat Swilling
- Sam Sword
- Steve Sylvester

== T ==
- Stan Talley
- Jack Tatum
- John Tautolo
- Giorgio Tavecchio
- Josh Taves
- Billy Taylor
- Malcolm Taylor
- Travis Taylor
- Trey Taylor
- Willie Teal
- Roderic Teamer
- Tony Teresa
- David Terrell
- Marcus Thigpen
- Ian Thomas
- Robert Thomas
- Skip Thomas
- Solomon Thomas
- William Thomas
- Kenbrell Thompkins
- Art Thoms
- Dont'e Thornton
- Neiko Thorpe
- Jerry Tillery
- Tony Tillmon
- Carson Tinker
- Larry Todd
- Dave Tollefson
- Eric Tomlinson
- Manase Tonga
- Reggie Tongue
- Pat Toomay
- Korey Toomer
- Stacey Toran
- Greg Townsend
- Johnny Townsend
- James Trapp
- Orville Trask
- Brynden Trawick
- Adam Treu
- Dalton Truax
- Desmond Trufant
- Olanda Truitt
- Justin Tuck
- Tre Tucker
- Marques Tuiasosopo
- Maugaula Tuitele
- Dan Turk
- D. J. Turner
- Eric Turner
- Dick Tyson

== U ==
- Gene Upshaw
- Regan Upshaw
- Herm Urenda

== V ==
- Vern Valdez
- Eddie Vanderdoes
- DeMarcus Van Dyke
- Mark van Eeghen
- Norwood Vann
- Brad Van Pelt
- Greg Van Roten
- Greedy Vance Jr.
- Ruben Vaughan
- Jared Veldheer
- John Vella
- Kendal Vickers
- Phil Villapiano
- Bob Voight

== W ==
- Michael Waddell
- John Wade
- Dalton Wagner
- Fred Wakefield
- Clive Walford
- Denard Walker
- Derrick Walker
- Fulton Walker
- Javon Walker
- Langston Walker
- Marquis Walker
- Vance Walker
- Aaron Wallace
- Darren Waller
- Andrew Walter
- Seth Wand
- B. J. Ward
- Jihad Ward
- Jeremy Ware
- Jylan Ware
- Timmie Ware
- Gerard Warren
- Jimmy Warren
- Ron Warzeka
- DeAndre Washington
- Fabian Washington
- Lionel Washington
- Ronnie Washington
- Ted Washington
- Todd Watkins
- Menelik Watson
- Robert Watts
- Ted Watts
- Dave Waymer
- Carl Weathers
- Gary Weaver
- J'Marcus Webb
- Sam Webb
- Warren Wells
- Greg Westbrooks
- Tyrone Wheatley
- Dwight Wheeler
- Philip Wheeler
- Ron Wheeler
- Alberto White
- Devin White
- Javin White
- John White
- Zamir White
- Cody Whitehair
- Tahir Whitehead
- Curtis Whitley
- Isaac Whitney
- Alvis Whitted
- Arthur Whittington
- Kyle Wilber
- Bruce Wilkerson
- Kristian Wilkerson
- Christian Wilkins
- Brock Williams
- Dan Williams
- David Williams
- Demise Williams
- Dokie Williams
- Harvey Williams
- Henry Williams
- Howie Williams
- Jamie Williams
- Jermaine Williams
- K. D. Williams
- Marcus Williams
- Mike Williams
- Randal Williams
- Ricky Williams
- Rodney Williams
- Roland Williams
- Sam Williams
- Tyrell Williams
- Willie Williams
- Fred Williamson
- J. R. Williamson
- Chester Willis
- Mitch Willis
- C. J. Wilson
- Gibril Wilson
- Marc Wilson
- Marcus Wilson
- Martez Wilson
- Nemiah Wilson
- Otis Wilson
- Tyree Wilson
- Wade Wilson
- Kamerion Wimbley
- Mike Wise
- Stefen Wisniewski
- Steve Wisniewski
- Jason Witten
- Joe Wong
- Dick Wood
- Terry Wooden
- LaMarr Woodley
- Chris Woods
- Charles Woodson
- Rod Woodson
- Xavier Woodson-Luster
- Scott Woolf
- Daryl Worley
- Alexander Wright
- Gabe Wright
- K. J. Wright
- Steve Wright
- Alvin Wyatt

== Y ==
- Rock Ya-Sin
- Byron Young
- Sam Young
- Usama Young
- Frank Youso

== Z ==
- Rich Zecher
- Amos Zereoué
- Jon Zogg
