= 1961 Oakland Raiders season =

AFL team season

- Owner: F. Wayne Valley
- General manager: Wesley Fry
- Head coach: Marty Feldman
- Home stadium: Candlestick Park

Results
- Record: 2–12
- Division place: 4th AFL Western
- Playoffs: Did not qualify

The 1961 Oakland Raiders season was the team's second in the American Football League. Based in Oakland, they played their home games in San Francisco at Candlestick Park.

The Raiders tried to improve on their 6–8 record from 1960, but finished last in the AFL West at 2–12, dropping their final six games. They set an AFL record in 1961, posting a point differential of negative-221, and surrendered 36 rushing touchdowns, a pro football record.

The following year, the Raiders moved to the new Frank Youell Field in Oakland, and played in that temporary venue for four seasons.

== Season schedule ==
Week	Date	Opponent	Result	Record	Venue	Attendance	Recap
1	September 9	at Houston Oilers	**L** 0–55	0–1	Jeppesen Stadium	16,231	Recap
2	September 17	at **San Diego Chargers**	**L** 0–44	0–2	Balboa Stadium	20,216	Recap
3	September 24	**Dallas Texans**	**L** 35–42	0–3	Candlestick Park	6,737	Recap
4	October 1	**Denver Broncos**	**W** 33–19	1–3	Candlestick Park	8,361	Recap
5	Bye						
6	October 15	at **Denver Broncos**	**L** 24–27	1–4	Bears Stadium	11,129	Recap
7	October 22	**San Diego Chargers**	**L** 10–41	1–5	Candlestick Park	12,014	Recap
8	October 29	New York Titans	**L** 6–14	1–6	Candlestick Park	7,138	Recap
9	November 5	at Buffalo Bills	**W** 31–22	2–6	War Memorial Stadium	17,027	Recap
10	November 11	at New York Titans	**L** 12–23	2–7	Polo Grounds	16,811	Recap
11	November 17	at Boston Patriots	**L** 17–20	2–8	Boston University Field	18,169	Recap
12	November 26	at **Dallas Texans**	**L** 11–43	2–9	Cotton Bowl	14,500	Recap
13	December 3	Buffalo Bills	**L** 21–26	2–10	Candlestick Park	6,500	Recap
14	December 9	Boston Patriots	**L** 21–35	2–11	Candlestick Park	6,500	Recap
15	December 17	Houston Oilers	**L** 16–47	2–12	Candlestick Park	4,821	Recap
Note: Intra-division opponents are in **bold** text.

== Standings ==
AFL Western Division
	W	L	T	PCT	DIV	PF	PA	STK
San Diego Chargers	12	2	0	.857	6–0	396	219	L1
Dallas Texans	6	8	0	.429	4–2	334	343	W2
Denver Broncos	3	11	0	.214	1–5	251	432	L7
Oakland Raiders	2	12	0	.143	1–5	237	458	L6

Note: Tie games were not officially counted in the standings in the AFL.

== Players ==
1961 Oakland Raiders roster
Quarterbacks (QB): 15 Tom Flores; 12 Nick Papac; Running backs (RB): 22 Wayne Crow P; 35 Clem Daniels; 21 George Fleming K; 20 Charley Fuller; 37 Alan Miller; Wide receivers (WR): 86 Jerry Burch; 43 Bob Coolbaugh; 82 Charlie Hardy; Tight ends (TE): 83 Doug Asad	Offensive linemen (OL): 65 Wayne Hawkins G; 00 Jim Otto C; 71 Cliff Roberts T; 61 Herb Roedel G; 64 Ron Sabal T/G; 63 Willie Smith G; 75 Jack Stone T; Defensive linemen (DL): 73 Jim Brewington DT; 76 Gary Finneran DE; 70 Harry Jagielski DT; 88 Jon Jelacic DE; 87 Charley Powell DE; 78 Bob Voight DT	Linebackers (LB): 53 Al Bansavage MLB/OLB; 44 Bob Dougherty OLB; 60 Tom Louderback MLB; 55 Riley Morris OLB; Defensive backs (DB): 47 Alex Bravo FS; 27 Joe Cannavino SS; 28 Bob Garner CB; 29 John Harris CB; 24 Fred Williamson CB; Special teams (ST)	Reserve: 52 Larry Barnes LB/K (IR); 79 Volney Peters DT (IR); Harrison Rece C (IR); 72 Hal Smith DT (IR); 25 Tony Teresa RB (IR); Herm Urenda WR (Military); Rookies in italics
