= 1960 Oakland Raiders season =

AFL team season (inaugural)

- Owner: Chet Soda; F. Wayne Valley
- General manager: Chet Soda
- Head coach: Eddie Erdelatz
- Home stadium: Kezar Stadium (first 4 games); Candlestick Park (last 3 games)

Results
- Record: 6–8
- Division place: 3rd AFL Western
- Playoffs: Did not qualify

The 1960 Oakland Raiders season was the inaugural one for the franchise and for the American Football League (AFL). Head coach Eddie Erdelatz led the team to a 6–8 finish, third in the four-team Western Division.

== Offseason ==
The Raiders were the last of the AFL's original eight teams to be accepted into the new league. As a result of the Minnesota franchise's defection to the NFL, Oakland was awarded the eighth AFL franchise on January 30, 1960. It was not until February 9 that the team named its first head coach, Eddie Erdelatz, who had success as head coach of the United States Naval Academy during the 1950s.

When the University of California refused to let the Raiders play home games at Memorial Stadium in Berkeley, they chose Kezar Stadium (also home to the NFL's 49ers) in San Francisco as their home field.

=== 1960 AFL draft ===
The Raiders inherited the draft picks of the Minneapolis franchise. Among the most notable picks was center Jim Otto, who was a fixture at the position for fifteen years and was selected to the Pro Football Hall of Fame in 1980.

== Team leaders ==
Passing

Tom Flores – 1,738 yds., 12 TD, 12 INT, 71.8 rating

Rushing

Tony Teresa – 139 att., 608 yds., 6 TD

Receiving

Billy Lott – 49 rec., 524 yds., 1 TD

== Regular season ==
Over the course of a fourteen-game regular season schedule, the Raiders faced each of the other seven AFL teams twice. The AFL had no playoff rounds, only a championship game between the league's two division winners, so Oakland's third-place finish was not enough to qualify.

== Season schedule ==
Week	Date	Opponent	Result	Record	Venue	Attendance	Game Recap
1	September 11	Houston Oilers	**L** 22–37	0–1	Kezar Stadium	12,703	Recap
2	September 16	**Dallas Texans**	**L** 16–34	0–2	Kezar Stadium	8,021	Recap
3	September 25	at Houston Oilers	**W** 14–13	1–2	Jeppesen Stadium	12,241	Recap
4	October 2	at **Denver Broncos**	**L** 14–31	1–3	Bears Stadium	18,372	Recap
5	October 9	at **Dallas Texans**	**W** 20–19	2–3	Cotton Bowl	21,000	Recap
6	October 16	Boston Patriots	**W** 27–14	3–3	Kezar Stadium	11,500	Recap
7	October 23	at Buffalo Bills	**L** 9–38	3–4	War Memorial Stadium	8,876	Recap
8	October 28	at New York Titans	**W** 28–27	4–4	Polo Grounds	10,000	Recap
9	November 4	at Boston Patriots	**L** 28–34	4–5	Boston University Field	8,446	Recap
10	November 13	Buffalo Bills	**W** 20–7	5–5	Kezar Stadium	8,800	Recap
11	Bye						
12	November 27	at **Los Angeles Chargers**	**L** 28–52	5–6	Los Angeles Memorial Coliseum	15,075	Recap
13	December 4	**Los Angeles Chargers**	**L 17–41**	5–7	Candlestick Park	12,061	Recap
14	December 11	New York Titans	**L** 28–31	5–8	Candlestick Park	9,037	Recap
15	December 17	**Denver Broncos**	**W** 48–10	6–8	Candlestick Park	5,159	Recap
Note: Intra-division opponents are in **bold** text.

=== Final standings ===
AFL Western Division
	W	L	T	PCT	DIV	PF	PA	STK
Los Angeles Chargers	10	4	0	.714	5–1	373	336	W4
Dallas Texans	8	6	0	.571	4–2	362	253	W3
Oakland Raiders	6	8	0	.429	2–4	319	388	W1
Denver Broncos	4	9	1	.308	1–5	309	393	L3

Note: Tie games were not officially counted in the standings in the AFL.

== Game summaries ==
=== Week 1: vs. Houston Oilers ===
	1	2	3	4	Total
Oilers	7	0	13	17	37
Raiders	0	7	7	8	22

The Raiders' first-ever regular season game was played on September 11, 1960, at home against the Houston Oilers. The Oilers took an early lead after a 43-yard pass from George Blanda to Charlie Hennigan. The Raiders evened the score in the second quarter when Tom Flores connected with Tony Teresa for a 13-yard pass. Oakland took the lead after Ed Macon intercepted a Blanda pass and ran 42 yards for a touchdown, but the Oilers scored 23 points to take a 30–15 lead. Flores found Jack Larscheid for a 46-yard scoring pass in the fourth quarter, but it was not nearly enough.

=== Week 2: vs. Dallas Texans ===
	1	2	3	4	Total
Texans	10	7	3	14	34
Raiders	0	10	0	6	16

The Raiders lost their second consecutive game in a Friday night matchup against Hank Stram's Dallas Texans. The Texans jumped out to an early 10–0 lead after a field goal and a touchdown pass from Cotton Davidson to Max Boydston. Oakland responded with 26-yard touchdown pass from Babe Parilli to Tony Teresa. The Texans' Jack Spikes ran for a 15-yard score in the second quarter, and Oakland responded with a field goal. After scoring a third-quarter field goal, Dallas pulled away with two touchdowns (rushing and receiving) from Johnny Robinson.

=== Week 3: at Houston Oilers ===
	1	2	3	4	Total
Raiders	7	0	0	7	14
Oilers	0	10	3	0	13

Oakland recorded its first-ever victory in a week 3 rematch against the eventual league champion Oilers. J.D. Smith ran for a 3-yard score to post the Raiders to an early 7–0 lead. The Oilers tied and then overtook the Raiders on the strength of a touchdown pass and two field goals by George Blanda. In the final period, Tom Flores found tight end Gene Prebola for a 14-yard touchdown, which was enough for the win.

=== Week 4: at Denver Broncos ===
	1	2	3	4	Total
Raiders	7	0	7	0	14
Broncos	3	21	7	0	31

In the inaugural game of what would become one of football's most intense rivalries, Frank Filchock's Denver Broncos easily defeated the Raiders on the strength of a 21-point outburst in the second quarter. Denver opened the scoring with a short first-quarter field goal, but Oakland took the lead after a 1-yard touchdown run by J.D. Smith. In the second period, a pair of touchdown strikes from Frank Tripucka to Lionel Taylor gave Denver a 17–7 lead. Bill Yelverton intercepted an Oakland pass and returned it 20 yards for a touchdown, giving Denver a 24–7 lead at halftime. A 2-yard touchdown run by Billy Lott capped the scoring for the Raiders.

=== Week 5: at Dallas Texans ===
	1	2	3	4	Total
Raiders	0	0	20	0	20
Texans	0	7	0	12	19

The Raiders improved to 2–3 in front of 21,000 at the Cotton Bowl. After a scoreless first quarter, the Texans' David Webster scored on an 80-yard interception return. The Raiders responded with three consecutive touchdowns, including a 98-yard kickoff return by James "Jetstream" Smith. Al Goldstein recorded receiving and rushing touchdowns in the third quarter. The Texans mounted a fourth-quarter comeback, but fell short when a two-point conversion attempt failed.

=== Week 7: at Buffalo Bills ===
	1	2	3	4	Total
Raiders	0	7	0	2	9
Bills	14	14	3	7	38

In week 7, the Raiders suffered their most lopsided loss of the season and fell to 3–4. The Bills dominated thanks to four touchdown passes and a touchdown run by Johnny Green. Oakland managed just one offensive score, a 1-yard touchdown run by James "Jetstream" Smith in the second quarter. Oakland recorded the first safety in team history in the fourth quarter when a Buffalo snap went out of the end zone.

=== Week 8: at New York Titans ===
	1	2	3	4	Total
Raiders	7	7	0	14	28
Titans	14	7	3	3	27

Oakland evened their record at 4–4 in a Friday night contest against the New York Titans. The two teams combined for 35 points in the first half, including a pair of touchdown passes each from Tom Flores and the Titans' Al Dorow. New York entered the fourth quarter with a 24–14 lead, but a pair of James "Jetstream" Smith rushing touchdowns gave Oakland the narrow win.

=== Week 9: at Boston Patriots ===
	1	2	3	4	Total
Raiders	0	7	7	14	28
Patriots	14	6	7	7	34

Boston avenged a week 6 loss in a high-scoring Friday night game at Nickerson Field. Oakland's Tony Teresa ran for three touchdowns, including a pair in the fourth quarter. Quarterback Tom Flores ran for an 8-yard touchdown in the third quarter.

=== Week 10: vs. Buffalo Bills ===
	1	2	3	4	Total
Bills	0	0	0	7	7
Raiders	10	3	7	0	20

The Raiders rebounded from the previous week's defeat by holding the Bills to just one touchdown. The offensive highlight for Oakland was an 83-yard touchdown run by Tony Teresa in the third quarter.

=== Week 12: at Los Angeles Chargers ===
	1	2	3	4	Total
Raiders	7	0	7	14	28
Chargers	14	17	7	14	52

After a week 11 bye, the Raiders met Sid Gillman's Los Angeles Chargers for the first time on November 27, 1960. The eventual Western Division champion Chargers piled up 31 points by halftime, led by quarterback Jack Kemp. Kemp passed for two touchdowns in the first half, and ran for another. Oakland got short touchdown runs by J.D. Smith and Billy Lott. Tom Flores and Babe Parilli passed for touchdowns.

=== Week 13: vs. Los Angeles Chargers ===
	1	2	3	4	Total
Chargers	0	14	0	27	41
Raiders	0	14	3	0	17

The Chargers continued their offensive deluge against the Raiders in week 13, erupting for 27 points in the fourth quarter. Billy Lott ran for a touchdown in the second quarter; Charlie Hardy caught an 11-yard pass from Tom Flores in the same period.

=== Week 14: vs. New York Titans ===
	1	2	3	4	Total
Titans	7	7	10	7	31
Raiders	0	7	14	7	28

The Raiders dropped their third consecutive contest, as the Titans evened the season series. Oakland took a 28–24 lead in the fourth quarter After Tom Flores found Tony Teresa for 3-yard touchdown pass, but the Titans got the margin of victory when Al Dorow connected with Dewey Bohling for a 17-yard touchdown pass.

=== Week 15: vs. Denver Broncos ===
	1	2	3	4	Total
Broncos	3	7	0	0	10
Raiders	3	14	0	31	48

On Saturday, December 17, 1960, the Raiders ended their inaugural campaign on a high note by easily defeating the Broncos 48–10. The two squads traded field goals in the first quarter, but Oakland entered halftime with a 17–10 lead on the strength of touchdown runs by Tom Flores and Tony Teresa. Denver's lone touchdown was a 6-yard pass from Frank Tripucka to Lionel Taylor in the second quarter. After that, Oakland scored 38 unanswered points, including 31 in the final period with four different Raiders scoring touchdowns. Babe Parilli passed for two scores in his final game as a Raider.

== Players ==
1960 Oakland Raiders roster
Quarterbacks (QB): 15 Tom Flores; 10 Babe Parilli; Running backs (RB): 23 Jack Larscheid; 31 Billy Lott; 32 J. D. Smith; 25 Tony Teresa; Wide receivers (WR): 81 Al Goldstein; 82 Charlie Hardy; 26 Nyle McFarlane; Tight ends (TE): 83 Doug Asad; 89 Gene Prebola	Offensive linemen (OL): 68 John Dittrich G; 65 Wayne Hawkins G/C; 67 Don Manoukian G; 74 Paul Oglesby T; 00 Jim Otto C; 64 Ron Sabal T; 72 Dalton Truax G; Defensive linemen (DL): 66 Ray Armstrong DT; 85 Carmen Cavalli DE; 79 Don Deskins DT; 80 George Fields DT; 87 Charley Powell DE; 78 Ron Warzeka DT	Linebackers (LB): 52 Larry Barnes MLB/OLB/K; 44 Bob Dougherty OLB; 60 Tom Louderback OLB; 55 Riley Morris MLB; Defensive backs (DB): 47 Alex Bravo CB/FS; 27 Joe Cannavino SS; 22 Wayne Crow FS/P; 29 John Harris CB; 28 Eddie Macon CB; Special teams (ST)	Reserve: Chris Plain T (IR); Rookies in italics

== Sources ==
- 1960 Oakland Raiders at databaseFootball.com
