= 1963 Oakland Raiders season =

AFL team season

- Owner: F. Wayne Valley
- General manager: Al Davis
- Head coach: Al Davis
- Home stadium: Frank Youell Field

Results
- Record: 10–4
- Division place: 2nd AFL Western
- Playoffs: Did not qualify

The 1963 Oakland Raiders season was the team's fourth in Oakland. The campaign saw the team attempt to improve upon its abysmal 1962 record of 1–13.

In his first year with the organization, Raiders legend Al Davis, formerly a receivers coach with the San Diego Chargers, replaced the team's original gold and black uniforms with the current "silver and black" scheme. Under his leadership as head coach and general manager, the Raiders stunned the rest of the AFL by winning ten games. They finished with a record of 10–4, which was good for second place in the Western Division, one game behind the eventual AFL champion Chargers, whom they had defeated twice. The Raiders swept the Western division in 1963, winning all six games. Prior to the final game of the season, for his role in the Raiders' miraculous turnaround, Al Davis was named the AFL Coach of the Year.

== Season schedule ==
Week	Date	Opponent	Result	Record	Venue	Attendance	Recap
1	September 7	at Houston Oilers	**W** 24–13	1–0	Jeppesen Stadium	24,749	Recap
2	September 15	Buffalo Bills	**W** 35–17	2–0	Frank Youell Field	17,568	Recap
3	September 22	Boston Patriots	**L** 14–20	2–1	Frank Youell Field	17,131	Recap
4	September 28	at New York Jets	**L** 7–10	2–2	Polo Grounds	17,100	Recap
5	October 5	at Buffalo Bills	**L** 0–12	2–3	War Memorial Stadium	24,846	Recap
6	October 11	at Boston Patriots	**L** 14–20	2–4	Fenway Park	26,494	Recap
7	October 20	New York Jets	**W** 49–26	3–4	Frank Youell Field	15,557	Recap
8	October 27	at **San Diego Chargers**	**W** 34–33	4–4	Balboa Stadium	30,182	Recap
9	November 3	**Kansas City Chiefs**	**W** 10–7	5–4	Frank Youell Field	18,919	Recap
10	November 8	at **Kansas City Chiefs**	**W** 22–7	6–4	Municipal Stadium	24,879	Recap
11	November 17	Bye week					
	November 24	Scheduled AFL games postponed to December 22					
12	November 28	at **Denver Broncos**	**W** 26–10	7–4	Bears Stadium	14,763	Recap
13	December 8	**San Diego Chargers**	**W** 41–27	8–4	Frank Youell Field	20,249	Recap
14	December 15	**Denver Broncos**	**W** 35–31	9–4	Frank Youell Field	15,223	Recap
15	December 22	Houston Oilers	**W** 52–49	10–4	Frank Youell Field	17,401	Recap
Note: Intra-division opponents are in **bold** text.

== Roster ==
1963 Oakland Raiders roster
Quarterbacks (QB): 19 Cotton Davidson; 15 Tom Flores; Running backs (RB): 36 Clem Daniels; 37 Alan Miller; 32 Glenn Shaw; Wide receivers (WR): 42 Dobie Craig; 84 Art Powell; 40 Bo Roberson; Tight ends (TE): 86 Ken Herock; 87 Bob Mischak	Offensive linemen (OL): 53 Dan Birdwell T; 66 Sonny Bishop G; 65 Wayne Hawkins G; 77 Proverb Jacobs T; 70 Dick Klein T; 00 Jim Otto C; 63 Ollie Spencer G; Defensive linemen (DL): 80 Dalva Allen DE; 46 Dave Costa DT; 88 Jon Jelacic DE; 73 Chuck McMurtry DT; 72 Jim Norris DT	Linebackers (LB): 56 Archie Matsos MLB; 81 Clancy Osborne OLB; 48 Charlie Rieves OLB; 49 Jackie Simpson OLB; Defensive backs (DB): 25 Claude Gibson CB; 27 Joe Krakoski SS; 45 Jim McMillin CB; 35 Tom Morrow FS; 20 Warren Powers FS; 24 Fred Williamson CB; Special teams (ST): 10 Mike Mercer K/P	Practice squad: 39 Herm Urenda WR; Reserve: 82 Jan Barrett TE (IR); 33 Doug Mayberry RB (IR); 78 Frank Youso T (IR); Rookies in italics

== Game summaries ==
=== Week 1 at Oilers ===
Week One: Oakland Raiders (0–0) at Houston Oilers (0–0)

Quarter	1	2	3	4	Total
Raiders	0	0	10	14	24
Oilers	6	0	0	7	13

at Jeppesen Stadium, Houston, Texas

- Date: September 7
- Game weather: 88 °F (31 °C)
- Game attendance: 24,749
- Box Score

Game information

First quarter

- HOU – George Blanda 30-yard field goal. Oilers 3–0.
- HOU – George Blanda 46-yard field goal. Oilers 6–0.

Second quarter

- No scoring

Third quarter

- OAK – Clem Daniels 2-yard run (Mike Mercer kick). Raiders 7–6.
- OAK – Mike Mercer 11-yard field goal. Raiders 10–6.

Fourth quarter

- OAK – Art Powell 85-yard pass from Tom Flores (Mike Mercer kick). Raiders 17–6.
- OAK – Ken Herock 15-yard fumble return (Mike Mercer kick). Raiders 24–6.
- HOU – Charley Hennigan 34-yard pass from Jacky Lee (George Blanda kick). Raiders 24–13.

Top passers

- OAK – Tom Flores – 7/21, 217 yards, TD
- HOU – Jacky Lee – 10/28, 123 yards, TD, INT

Top rushers

- OAK – Clem Daniels – 16 rushes, 73 yards, TD
- HOU – Charley Tolar – 9 rushes, 44 yards

Top receivers

- OAK – Art Powell – 7 receptions, 181 yards, TD
- HOU – Charley Hennigan – 7 receptions, 101 yards, TD

=== Week 2 ===
Team	1	2	3	4	Total
Bills	0	10	7	0	17
• Raiders	0	21	7	7	35

- Date: September 15
- Location: Frank Youell Field, Oakland, California
- Game attendance: 17,568
- Game weather: 66 °F (19 °C); wind 12 mph

Scoring summary
Q2	OAK	Powell 5-yard pass from Davidson (Mercer kick)	OAK 7–0
Q2	BUF	Yoho 32-yard field goal	OAK 7–3
Q2	OAK	Daniels 73-yard pass from Davidson (Mercer kick)	OAK 14–3
Q2	OAK	Miller 2-yard run (Mercer kick)	OAK 21–3
Q2	BUF	Dubenion 17-yard pass from Kemp (Yoho kick)	OAK 21–10
Q3	OAK	Davidson 5-yard run (Mercer kick)	OAK 28–10
Q3	BUF	Dubenion 58-yard pass from Kemp (Yoho kick)	OAK 28–17
Q4	OAK	Jelacic 1-yard interception return (Mercer kick)	OAK 35–17

=== Week 7 ===
Team	1	2	3	4	Total
Jets	7	6	0	13	26
• Raiders	21	14	7	7	49

- Date: October 20
- Location: Frank Youell Field, Oakland, California
- Game attendance: 15,557
- Game weather: 62 °F (17 °C); wind 13 mph

Scoring summary
Q1	NYJ	Heeter 34-yard pass from Wood (Guesman kick)	NYJ 7–0
Q1	OAK	Miller 3-yard run (Mercer kick)	Tie 7–7
Q1	OAK	Craig 93-yard pass from Flores (Mercer kick)	OAK 14–7
Q1	OAK	Daniels 8-yard run (Mercer kick)	OAK 21–7
Q2	NYJ	Guesman 51-yard field goal	OAK 21–10
Q2	NYJ	Guesman 16-yard field goal	OAK 21–13
Q2	OAK	Herock 38-yard pass from Davidson (Mercer kick)	OAK 28–13
Q2	OAK	Daniels 56-yard pass from Davidson (Mercer kick)	OAK 35–13
Q3	OAK	Miller 8-yard pass from Davidson (Mercer kick)	OAK 42–13
Q4	OAK	Daniels 74-yard run (Mercer kick)	OAK 49–13
Q4	NYJ	Smolinski 49-yard pass from Hall (Guesman kick)	OAK 49–20
Q4	NYJ	Hall 6-yard run	OAK 49–26

=== Week 8 ===
Team	1	2	3	4	Total
• Raiders	7	7	7	13	34
Chargers	10	7	9	7	33

- Date: October 27
- Location: Balboa Stadium, San Diego, California
- Game attendance: 30,182
- Game weather: 68 °F (20 °C); wind 6 mph

Scoring summary
Q1	OAK	Powell 20-yard pass from Flores (Mercer kick)	OAK 7–0
Q1	SD	Blair 23-yard field goal	OAK 7–3
Q1	SD	Alworth 32-yard pass from Rote (Blair kick)	SD 10–7
Q2	OAK	Miller 5-yard pass from Flores (Mercer kick)	OAK 14–10
Q2	SD	MacKinnon 69-yard pass from Hadl (Blair kick)	SD 17–14
Q3	SD	Harris 23-yard interception return (kick failed)	SD 23–14
Q3	OAK	Craig 39-yard pass from Davidson (Mercer kick)	SD 23–21
Q3	SD	Blair 36-yard field goal	SD 26–21
Q4	OAK	Powell 46-yard pass from Davidson (Mercer kick)	OAK 28–26
Q4	SD	Lincoln 51-yard run (Blair kick)	SD 33–28
Q4	OAK	Shaw 9-yard pass from Davidson (run failed)	OAK 34–33

- Clem Daniels 19 Rush, 125 Yds

=== Week 9 ===
Team	1	2	3	4	Total
Chiefs	0	7	0	0	7
• Raiders	0	3	0	7	10

- Date: November 3
- Location: Frank Youell Field, Oakland, California
- Game attendance: 18,919
- Game weather: 55 °F (13 °C); wind 12 mph

Scoring summary
Q2	OAK	Mercer 10-yard field goal	OAK 3–0
Q2	KC	Haynes 1-yard run (Brooker kick)	KC 7–3
Q4	OAK	Gibson 85-yard punt return (Mercer kick)	OAK 10–7

=== Week 10 ===
Team	1	2	3	4	Total
• Raiders	3	19	0	0	22
Chiefs	0	0	7	0	7

- Date: November 8
- Location: Kansas City Municipal Stadium, Kansas City, Missouri
- Game attendance: 24,879
- Game weather: 57 °F (14 °C); wind 10 mph

Scoring summary
Q1	OAK	Mercer 14-yard field goal	OAK 3–0
Q2	OAK	Mercer 41-yard field goal	OAK 6–0
Q2	OAK	Powell 24-yard pass from Flores (Mercer kick)	OAK 13–0
Q2	OAK	Wilson tackled in end zone	OAK 15–0
Q2	OAK	Powell 34-yard pass from Flores (Mercer kick)	OAK 22–0
Q3	KC	McClinton 4-yard run (Spikes kick)	OAK 22–7

- Clem Daniels 31 Rush, 122 Yds

=== Week 12 ===
Team	1	2	3	4	Total
• Raiders	2	0	14	10	26
Broncos	0	3	0	7	10

- Date: November 28
- Location: Bears Stadium, Denver, Colorado
- Game attendance: 14,763
- Game weather: 39 °F (4 °C); wind 9 mph

Scoring summary
Q1	OAK	Safety, Joe tackled in end zone	OAK 2–0
Q2	DEN	Mingo 52-yard field goal	DEN 3–2
Q3	OAK	Roberson 39-yard pass from Davidson (Mercer kick)	OAK 9–3
Q3	OAK	Jelacic 19-yard fumble return (Mercer kick)	OAK 16–3
Q4	OAK	Mercer 16-yard field goal	OAK 19–3
Q4	OAK	Shaw 1-yard run (Mercer kick)	OAK 26–3
Q4	DEN	Joe 34-yard pass from Breaux (Mingo kick)	OAK 26–10

=== Week 13 ===
Team	1	2	3	4	Total
Chargers	7	13	7	0	27
• Raiders	3	7	0	31	41

- Date: December 8
- Location: Frank Youell Field, Oakland, California
- Game attendance: 20,249
- Game weather: 48 °F (9 °C); wind 6 mph

Scoring summary
Q1	SD	Norton 32-yard pass from Rote (Blair kick)	SD 7–0
Q1	OAK	Mercer 37-yard field goal	SD 7–3
Q2	SD	Jackson 14-yard run (Blair kick)	SD 14–3
Q2	OAK	Powell 44-yard pass from Flores (Mercer kick)	SD 14–10
Q2	SD	MacKinnon 5-yard pass from Rote (kick failed)	SD 20–10
Q3	SD	Alworth 15-yard pass from Rote (Blair kick)	SD 27–10
Q4	OAK	Powell 10-yard pass from Davidson (Mercer kick)	SD 27–17
Q4	OAK	Mercer 30-yard field goal	SD 27–20
Q4	OAK	Davidson 9-yard run (Mercer kick)	Tie 27–27
Q4	OAK	Powell 41-yard pass from Davidson (Mercer kick)	OAK 34–27
Q4	OAK	Miller 2-yard run (Mercer kick)	OAK 41–27

- Art Powell 6 Rec, 132 Yds

=== Week 14 ===
Team	1	2	3	4	Total
Broncos	7	3	14	7	31
• Raiders	14	7	7	7	35

- Date: December 15
- Location: Frank Youell Field, Oakland, California
- Game weather: 41 °F (5 °C); wind 5 mph

Scoring summary
Q1	OAK	Roberson 32-yard pass from Flores (Mercer kick)	OAK 7–0
Q1	OAK	Powell 18-yard pass from Flores (Mercer kick)	OAK 14–0
Q1	DEN	Joe 9-yard run (Mingo kick)	OAK 14–7
Q2	OAK	Daniels 26-yard pass from Flores (Mercer kick)	OAK 21–7
Q2	DEN	Mingo 35-yard field goal	OAK 21–10
Q3	OAK	Daniels 43-yard pass from Flores (Mercer kick)	OAK 28–10
Q3	DEN	Prebola 9-yard pass from Slaughter (Mingo kick)	OAK 28–17
Q3	DEN	Dixon 2-yard run (Mingo kick)	OAK 28–24
Q4	OAK	Powell 3-yard pass from Flores (Mercer kick)	OAK 35–24
Q4	DEN	Taylor 29-yard pass from Slaughter (Mingo kick)	OAK 35–31

- Clem Daniels 5 Rec, 127 Yds

=== Week 15 ===
Team	1	2	3	4	Total
Oilers	14	21	14	0	49
• Raiders	7	28	7	10	52

- Date: December 22
- Location: Frank Youell Field, Oakland, California
- Game weather: 46 °F (8 °C); wind 7 mph

Scoring summary
Q1		OAK	Gibson 69-yard punt return (Mercer kick)	OAK 7–0
Q1		HOU	Hennigan 4-yard pass from Blanda (Blanda kick)	Tie 7–7
Q1		HOU	Smith 2-yard run (Blanda kick)	HOU 14–7
Q2		HOU	Dewveall 12-yard pass from Blanda (Blanda kick)	HOU 21–7
Q2		OAK	Herock 7-yard pass from Flores (Mercer kick)	HOU 21–14
Q2		OAK	Daniels 56-yard pass from Flores (Mercer kick)	Tie 21–21
Q2		HOU	Smith 25-yard pass from Blanda (Blanda kick)	HOU 28–21
Q2		OAK	Powell 81-yard pass from Flores (Mercer kick)	Tie 28–28
Q2		HOU	Tolar 1-yard run (Blanda kick)	HOU 35–28
Q2		OAK	Powell 20-yard pass from Flores (Mercer kick)	Tie 35–35
Q3		OAK	Powell 45-yard pass from Flores (Mercer kick)	OAK 42–35
Q3		HOU	Dewveall 26-yard pass from Blanda (Blanda kick)	Tie 42–42
Q3		HOU	McLeod 21-yard pass from Blanda (Blanda kick)	HOU 49–42
Q4		OAK	Powell 23-yard pass from Flores (Mercer kick)	Tie 49–49
Q4	4:37	OAK	Mercer 39-yard field goal	OAK 52–49

- Tom Flores 17/29, 407 Yds
- Clem Daniels 22 Rush, 158 Yds
- Art Powell 10 Rec, 247 Yds

== Standings ==
AFL Western Division
	W	L	T	PCT	DIV	PF	PA	STK
San Diego Chargers	11	3	0	.786	3–3	399	255	W2
Oakland Raiders	10	4	0	.714	6–0	363	282	W8
Kansas City Chiefs	5	7	2	.417	2–4	347	263	W3
Denver Broncos	2	11	1	.154	1–5	301	473	L7

Note: Tie games were not officially counted in the standings in the AFL.
