= Frank Youell Field =

Former football stadium in Oakland, California

- Interactive map of Frank Youell Field
- Address: 900 Fallon Street
- Location: Oakland, California, U.S.
- Coordinates: 37.794°N 122.263°W
- Owner: City of Oakland
- Operator: City of Oakland
- Capacity: 22,000
- Surface: Natural grass

Construction
- Groundbreaking: 1961
- Opened: 1962
- Closed: 1969
- Demolished: 1969
- Cost: $400,000

Tenant
- Oakland Raiders (AFL) (1962–1965)

Frank Youell Field was a football stadium on the west coast of the United States, located in Oakland, California. It was the home of the Oakland Raiders of the American Football League for four seasons, from 1962 through 1965.

The stadium was a temporary home while Oakland–Alameda County Coliseum was being built; it seated 22,000 and cost $400,000 to build. The facility was named for Francis J. Youell (1883–1967), an Oakland undertaker, owner of the Chapel of the Oaks, city councilman, and sports booster.

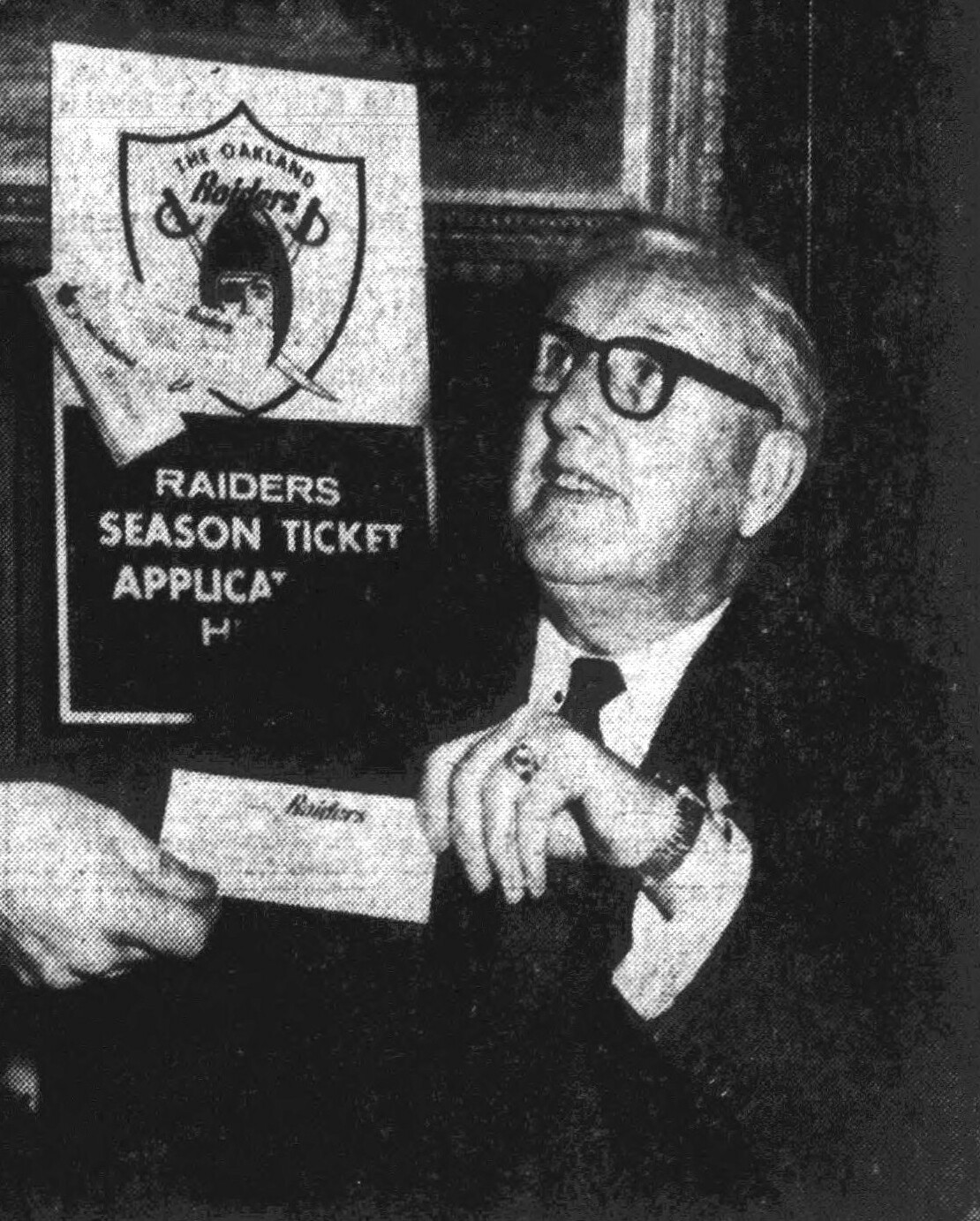
Frank Youell, the namesake of the Oakland Raiders temporary home from 1962 to 1965.

It was located at 900 Fallon Street, on the grounds of what is now part of Laney College, next to the channel which connects Lake Merritt to the Oakland Estuary and adjacent to the Nimitz Freeway. The site was formerly part of the "Auditorium Village Housing Project", one of several temporary housing tracts built by the federal government in the San Francisco Bay Area for the thousands of workers who poured into the region during World War II to work in war industries, especially, in shipyards such as the Kaiser Shipyards.

During their first two seasons, the Raiders played their home games in San Francisco, at Kezar Stadium (1960) and Candlestick Park (1960, 1961). They played their first regular season game at Frank Youell Field in 1962 on September 9 against the New York Titans and the Raiders lost, 28–17, the first of thirteen consecutive losses that season. The final game at the stadium in December 1965 was also against New York, renamed the Jets, and the Raiders won, 24–14.

Frank Youell Field remained in operation for several years and hosted some high school football games after the Raiders moved into the Coliseum in 1966; it was demolished in 1969 to make way for extra parking for Laney College.

Preceded by Candlestick Park	Home of the Oakland Raiders; 1962 – 1965	Succeeded by Oakland–Alameda County Coliseum
