= Herb Roedel =

American football player (1939–2022)

- Roedel with his two sons

No. 61
- Position: Guard

Personal information
- Born: March 30, 1939; Appleton, Wisconsin, U.S.
- Died: July 25, 2022 (aged 83); San Rafael, California, U.S.
- Listed height: 6 ft 3 in (1.91 m)
- Listed weight: 230 lb (104 kg)

Career information
- High school: St. Mary Catholic (Neenah, Wisconsin)
- College: Marquette
- NFL draft: 1961: undrafted

Career history
- Dallas Cowboys (1961)*; Oakland Raiders (1961)
- * Offseason or practice squad member only

Career AFL statistics
- Games played: 14
- Stats at Pro Football Reference

Herbert Thomas Roedel (March 30, 1939 – July 25, 2022) was an American professional football player who was a guard for one season in the American Football League (AFL) for the Oakland Raiders. He played college football at Marquette.

== Early life and education ==
Roedel was born on March 30, 1939, in Appleton, Wisconsin. He attended St. Mary Catholic High School in Neenah, Wisconsin, where he was a star football player on both offense and defense. An article in the News-Record wrote of Roedel: "[he] has played as many minutes offense and defense as any member of the club. In more than one game he has gone all the way. Herb is a 200 pounder who has developed as one of the team's better straight ahead blockers and a defensive strongpoint." In his time at St. Mary, Roedel won All-Fox Valley Catholic Conference as well as all-state honors.

After graduating from St. Mary, Roedel joined Marquette University on a full football scholarship. The Post-Crescent reported that he was rated "No. 1 guard prospect." He was among 29 freshmen to earn football numerals in 1957. He made the varsity team in 1958 and began seeing action at guard. In 1959, Roedel earned a varsity letter and became a starting guard. He continued as starter for his senior season, 1960.

Roedel, who studied mechanical engineering at Marquette, graduated in 1961.

== Professional career ==
After going unselected in the 1961 NFL draft, Roedel was signed by the Dallas Cowboys. He reported to training camp in July. After not making the final roster there, Roedel was signed by the Oakland Raiders in the rival American Football League (AFL). He began the season as the team's number two left guard, and saw action as a backup. After an injury to Wayne Hawkins, Roedel became starting guard for a time. He finished his rookie year with 14 appearances and two starts.

After just one season of professional football, Roedel announced in March 1962 that he was retiring to concentrate on an engineering career.

== Later life and death ==
Roedel later became an engineer in San Francisco, California. He also raced sailboats at the St. Francis Yacht Club nearby. Afterwards, he was an avid road cyclist. It was through cycling that he met his future wife, Jessica Wimer. They married on May 28, 1983, and settled in San Rafael. The couple had two children. Later, Roedel began a business and named it the Derex Company, after his two sons, Alex and Derek.

In 1988, Roedel was inducted into the St. Mary Catholic High School Athletic Hall of Fame.

Roedel died on July 25, 2022, at the age of 83.
