= Alex Bravo =

American gridiron football player (1930–2020)

No. 95, 21, 47
- Position: Defensive back

Personal information
- Born: July 27, 1930; Tucson, Arizona, U.S.
- Died: September 1, 2020 (aged 90)
- Listed height: 6 ft 0 in (1.83 m)
- Listed weight: 190 lb (86 kg)

Career information
- High school: Santa Barbara (CA)
- College: Cal Poly
- NFL draft: 1954: 9th round, 106th overall pick

Career history
- Saskatchewan Roughriders (1956); Los Angeles Rams (1957–1958); Oakland Raiders (1960-1961)

Career NFL/AFL statistics
- Interceptions: 6
- Fumble recoveries: 1
- Stats at Pro Football Reference

Alexander Bravo (July 27, 1930 – September 1, 2020) was an American professional football player. He played defensive back with the Los Angeles Rams and Oakland Raiders, as well as the Saskatchewan Roughriders in the Canadian Football League (CFL).

== Early life ==
Bravo graduated from Santa Barbara High School, where he was an all-state halfback.

== College career ==
He played college football at California Polytechnic State University and is a member of their athletic hall of fame (inducted 1988). For Cal Poly, Bravo collected all-conference honors in 1951, 1952 and 1953, along the way earning the nickname "Boom Boom" for his explosive running style.

Collegiate Statistics (Varsity)
Season	School	Rush. Att.	Rush. Yds.	Avg.	LG	Overall Pts.
1951 (So.)	CP	131	850	6.5	77	48
1952 (Jr.)	CP	132	702	5.3	85	42
1953 (Sr.)	CP	111	686	6.2	n/a	61
Totals		374	2,238	6.0	85	151

== Professional career ==
After being selected 106th overall in the ninth round by the L.A. Rams in the 1954 NFL draft, Bravo would later go on to sign with the then-AFL's Oakland Raiders. Bravo was converted primarily to defensive back at the pro level.

NFL and AFL Statistics
Year	Team	GP	GS	INT	INT Ret. Yds.	FR
1957	LAR	12	3	0	0	1
1958	LAR	6	2	0	0	0
1960	OAK	14	14	4	64	0
1961	OAK	14	14	2	0	0
Totals		46	33	6	64	1

Bravo continued his involvement in sports, working as a football official and track and field starter into his late 80s.
