= Barry Black (American football) =

American football player (born 1965)

No. 67
- Position: Guard

Personal information
- Born: March 7, 1965 (age 61); Santa Rosa, California, U.S.
- Listed height: 6 ft 2 in (1.88 m)
- Listed weight: 280 lb (127 kg)

Career information
- High school: Santa Rosa High School
- College: Santa Rosa Junior College; Boise State University

Career history
- New York Jets (1987); Los Angeles Raiders (1987)

Career statistics
- Games played: 3
- Games started: 2
- Stats at Pro Football Reference

Barry Gordon Black is a former American football player who played for the New York Jets and Los Angeles Raiders.

== Early life ==
Black was born on March 7, 1965, in Santa Rosa, California. He went to Santa Rosa High School. Black also went to Santa Rosa Junior College and
Boise State University. In 1986, playing for Boise State, he earned an honorable mention for the All-Big Sky Conference team.

== Career ==
On May 20, 1987, Black was drafted by the New York Jets, but he did not play any games with them as he signed with the Los Angeles Raiders on September 23 of that same year. He made the team as a replacement player during the 1987 players strike. Black played 3 games with the Raiders, but he was released on October 19, 1987.
