= Alan Miller (American football) =

American football player (1937–2024)

No. 32, 37
- Position: Fullback

Personal information
- Born: June 19, 1937; Mount Kisco, New York, U.S.
- Died: October 20, 2024 (aged 87); Orchard Lake Village, Michigan, U.S.
- Listed height: 6 ft 0 in (1.83 m)
- Listed weight: 219 lb (99 kg)

Career information
- High school: Milford (CT)
- College: Boston College
- NFL draft: 1959: 19th round, 219th overall pick

Career history
- Boston Patriots (1960); Oakland Raiders (1961–1965)

Awards and highlights
- AFL All-Star (1961)

Career AFL statistics
- Rushing yards: 1,395
- Rushing average: 3.6
- Receptions: 140
- Receiving yards: 1,470
- Total touchdowns: 21
- Stats at Pro Football Reference

Alan Miller (June 19, 1937 – October 20, 2024) was an American attorney and collegiate and professional football fullback. He played college football for Boston College. While at Boston College, Miller was a member of the All East and All New England Teams in 1959, as well as a member of the Catholic All American Team in 1958 and 1959. Miller was voted winner of the Omelia Trophy in 1959 and was a member of the North Squad in the Senior Bowl All Star Game played in Mobile, Alabama in 1960. Like many BC athletes, he was signed to a professional contract by the American Football League’s Boston Patriots, playing for them in their first year of existence, 1960. Miller was the Patriots' leading rusher in 1960. In 1961, he was traded to the AFL’s Oakland Raiders, and was a 1961 AFL All-Star. He played for the Raiders through 1965. Miller was a member of the AFL All Star Team in 1961, captain of the Oakland Raiders in 1963–65 and Most Valuable Player of the Raiders in 1965.

== AFL career statistics ==
Legend
| **Bold** | Career high |

| Year | Team | Games | | Rushing | | | | | Receiving | | | | |
| Year | Team | GP | GS | Att | Yds | Avg | Lng | TD | Rec | Yds | Avg | Lng | TD |
|---|---|---|---|---|---|---|---|---|---|---|---|---|---|
| 1960 | BOS | 14 | 8 | **101** | **416** | 4.1 | 33 | 2 | 29 | 284 | 9.8 | 48 | 2 |
| 1961 | OAK | 14 | 13 | 85 | 255 | 3.0 | 15 | **3** | **36** | 315 | 8.8 | 55 | **4** |
| 1962 | OAK | 14 | 10 | 65 | 182 | 2.8 | 11 | 1 | 20 | 259 | **13.0** | **71** | 0 |
| 1963 | OAK | 14 | 14 | 62 | 270 | **4.4** | **35** | **3** | 34 | **404** | 11.9 | 44 | 2 |
| 1965 | OAK | 14 | 9 | 73 | 272 | 3.7 | 26 | 1 | 21 | 208 | 9.9 | 39 | 3 |
| Career | | 70 | 54 | 386 | 1,395 | 3.6 | 35 | 10 | 140 | 1,470 | 10.5 | 71 | 11 |

== Legal career ==
Miller attended law school at Boston University. Miller graduated with a juris doctor degree cum laude from Boston University Law School in 1964, finishing second in his class. Miller was an editor of the Boston University Law Review. Upon completing his football and law school career, Miller served as general counsel to the American and National Football League Players Association from 1967 to 1972. In 2007, Miller was awarded the Silver Shingle Award from Boston University School of Law for distinguished service to the legal profession. Miller also served as legal counsel to the World Football League Players Association and worked for NBC television as a color commentator for NFL games.

Miller was a motorsports attorney and agent who represented various stars in motorsport, most notably Jimmie Johnson, Helio Castroneves, Clint Bowyer, Martin Truex Jr., and Greg Moore. Miller, along with Castroneves were charged in 2008 with tax evasion and conspiracy stemming from Castroneves' first contract with Penske Racing, which was signed following the death of Moore.

== Death ==
Miller died on October 20, 2024, at the age of 87.

== See also ==
- Other American Football League players
