= Nick Papac =

American football player (1935–2009)

Profile
- Position: Quarterback

Personal information
- Born: May 18, 1935; Fresno, California, U.S.
- Died: April 18, 2009 (aged 73)
- Listed height: 5 ft 11 in (1.80 m)
- Listed weight: 190 lb (86 kg)

Career information
- High school: Sanger (Sanger, California)
- College: Fresno State
- NFL draft: 1961: undrafted

Career history
- Oakland Raiders (1961–1962); Los Angeles Rams (1962)*
- * Offseason or practice squad member only

Career NFL statistics
- TD–INT: 2-7
- Passing yards: 173
- Passer rating: 19
- Rushing yards: 28
- Rushing touchdowns: 1
- Stats at Pro Football Reference

Nick Papac (May 18, 1935 – April 18, 2009) was an American professional football player who was a quarterback for one season in the American Football League (AFL). He played college football for the California Golden Bears and Fresno State Bulldogs.

== Early life ==
Papac was born in Fresno, California and grew up in Sanger, California and attended Sanger High School. He was the Apaches' starting quarterback ahead of future Raiders teammate Tom Flores.

== College career ==
Papac began his collegiate career at the University of California, Berkeley. He played two seasons, mostly on the junior varsity team, with the Golden Bears before joining the Army after his sophomore year. He was stationed at Fort Carson and quarterbacked the base's football team for two years. After being discharged from the Army, Papac enrolled at Fresno State University and played two seasons for the Bulldogs and was the team's starting quarterback.

== Professional career ==
After going undrafted after the end of his collegiate career Papac was signed by the Oakland Raiders. As a rookie he primarily served as Tom Flores's backup. He finished the season with 13 of 44 pass attempts completed for 173 yards with two touchdowns and seven interceptions and also rushed for 28 yards and one touchdown. Papac was released by the Raiders during the following offseason. He was signed by the Los Angeles Rams but was cut during training camp.
