= Joe Barbee =

American football player (1933–1969)

No. 77
- Position: Defensive tackle

Personal information
- Born: August 30, 1933; Cleveland, Ohio
- Died: August 12, 1969 (aged 35); Cleveland, Ohio
- Listed height: 6 ft 3 in (1.91 m)
- Listed weight: 250 lb (113 kg)

Career information
- High school: Twinsburg (OH)
- College: Kent State

Career history
- Oakland Raiders (1960)

Career statistics
- Games played: 1
- Stats at Pro Football Reference

Joseph Adams Barbee (August 30, 1933 – August 12, 1969) was a college and professional American football defensive tackle. He played college football at Kent State, and played professionally in the American Football League for the Oakland Raiders in 1960.

== See also ==
- List of American Football League players
