= Willie Smith (offensive tackle, born 1937) =

American football player (born 1937)

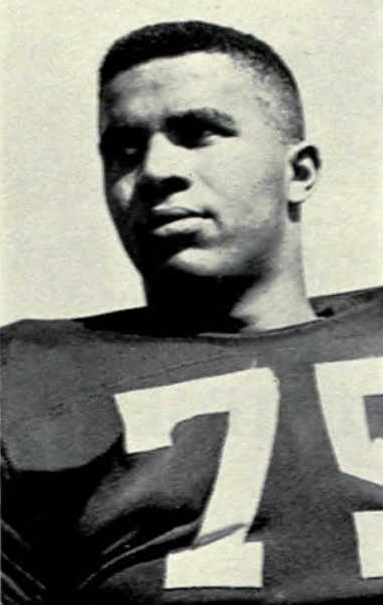
- Smith in 1958

No. 71, 63
- Positions: Guard, tackle

Personal information
- Born: November 1, 1937 (age 89); Little Rock, Arkansas, U.S.
- Listed height: 6 ft 3 in (1.91 m)
- Listed weight: 255 lb (116 kg)

Career information
- High school: Dunbar (AR)
- College: Michigan
- NFL draft: 1959: 8th round, 94th overall pick

Career history
- Denver Broncos (1960); Oakland Raiders (1961)

Career AFL statistics
- Games played: 28
- Games started: 28
- Stats at Pro Football Reference

Willie Smith (born November 1, 1937) is an American former professional football player who was an offensive lineman in the American Football League (AFL). A native of Little Rock, Arkansas, Smith attended Dunbar High School, a segregated high school for African-American students. He was teammates during high school with Jim Pace, and the two of them opted to attend the University of Michigan where they were teammates for the school's football team. Smith played college football as a tackle for the Michigan Wolverines team from 1956 to 1958. He was selected by the Chicago Bears in the eighth round (94th overall pick) of the 1959 NFL draft, but he opted instead to play in the American Football League. Smith appeared in all 14 games for the 1960 Denver Broncos, mostly at the right guard position. In August 1961, the Broncos traded Smith to the Oakland Raiders for Gene Prebola. He was the starting left guard for the 1961 Oakland Raiders, appearing in all 14 games. He was placed on waivers by the Raiders in late August 1962.
