= Jack Stone (American football) =

American football player (born 1936)

No. 70, 75
- Position: Offensive tackle

Personal information
- Born: July 28, 1936 (age 90); Ellensburg, Washington, U.S.
- Listed height: 6 ft 2 in (1.88 m)
- Listed weight: 245 lb (111 kg)

Career information
- High school: Gresham (Gresham, Oregon)
- College: Oregon
- AFL draft: 1960

Career history
- Dallas Texans (1960); Oakland Raiders (1961–1962)
- Stats at Pro Football Reference

Jack Richard Stone (born July 28, 1936) is an American former professional football offensive tackle who played in the American Football League (AFL) with the Dallas Texans and Oakland Raiders. He played college football for the Oregon Ducks.

== Early life ==
Jack Richard Stone was born on July 28, 1936, in Ellensburg, Washington. He attended Gresham High School in Gresham, Oregon.

== College career ==
Stone enrolled at the University of Oregon to play college football for the Ducks. He was on the freshman team in 1955. He was a member of the varsity team from 1957 to 1959 but did not earn a letter until 1959.

== Professional career ==
Stone was selected by the Dallas Texans in the first selections portion of the 1960 American Football League draft. He played in all 14 games, starting 11, for the Texans during the inaugural 1960 AFL season.

On December 19, 1960, Stone was traded to the Oakland Raiders for Abner Haynes. Stone took over at tackle for the injured Paul Oglesby. Stone started all 28 games for the Raiders from 1961 to 1962. The Raiders went 2–12 in 1961 and 1–13 in 1962. He was released on September 4, 1963, before the start of the 1963 regular season.
