= Carmen Cavalli =

American football player (1937–2024)

No. 85
- Position: Defensive end

Personal information
- Born: June 11, 1937; Philadelphia, Pennsylvania, U.S.
- Died: March 20, 2024 (aged 86); Warminster Township, Pennsylvania, U.S.
- Listed height: 6 ft 4 in (1.93 m)
- Listed weight: 245 lb (111 kg)

Career information
- High school: St. Thomas More (Philadelphia)
- College: Richmond
- AFL draft: 1960

Career history
- Oakland Raiders (1960); Wheeling Ironmen (1962); Philadelphia Bulldogs (1965–1966)

Career statistics
- Games played: 14
- Stats at Pro Football Reference

Carmen Anthony Cavalli Jr. (June 11, 1937 – March 20, 2024) was an American professional football player who was a defensive end for one season with the Oakland Raiders of the American Football League (AFL). He played college football at the University of Richmond for the Richmond Spiders.

== Career ==
In 1962, Cavalli joined the Wheeling Ironmen of the United Football League. In 1965, he joined the Philadelphia Bulldogs of the Continental Football League. In 1966, the Bulldogs won the CFL championship.

== Death ==
Cavalli died on March 20, 2024, at the age of 86.
