= Nyle McFarlane =

American football player (1935–1986)

No. 26
- Position: Halfback

Personal information
- Born: November 25, 1935; Lehi, Utah
- Died: January 15, 1986 (aged 50); Salt Lake City, Utah
- Listed height: 6 ft 2 in (1.88 m)
- Listed weight: 205 lb (93 kg)

Career information
- High school: Jordan (Sandy, Utah)
- College: BYU

Career history
- Oakland Raiders (1960); Dallas Cowboys
- Stats at Pro Football Reference

Hardy Nyle McFarlane (November 25, 1935 – January 15, 1986) was an American football player who played one season with the Oakland Raiders as well as with the Dallas Cowboys. He played college football at the Brigham Young University.
