= J. D. Smith (fullback, born 1936) =

American football player (born 1936)

J.D. Smith
No. 32, 36
- Position: Fullback

Personal information
- Born: October 18, 1936 (age 90); Los Angeles, California, U.S.
- Listed height: 6 ft 1 in (1.85 m)
- Listed weight: 210 lb (95 kg)

Career information
- High school: Thomas Jefferson (Los Angeles)
- College: Compton CC

Career history
- Oakland Raiders (1960); Chicago Bears (1961)
- Stats at Pro Football Reference

James D. Smith (born October 18, 1936) is an American former professional football player who was a fullback with the Oakland Raiders of the American Football League (AFL) and Chicago Bears of the National Football League (NFL). He played college football at Compton Community College.
