= Gene Prebola =

American football player (1938–2021)

No. 89, 88, 85
- Position: Tight end

Personal information
- Born: June 30, 1938; Bronx, New York, U.S.
- Died: December 10, 2021 (aged 83); Sparta, New Jersey, U.S.
- Listed height: 6 ft 3 in (1.91 m)
- Listed weight: 225 lb (102 kg)

Career information
- High school: Memorial (West New York, New Jersey)
- College: Boston University (1956–1959)
- NFL draft: 1960: 19th round, 219th overall pick
- AFL draft: 1960

Career history
- Oakland Raiders (1960); Denver Broncos (1961–1963); New York Jets (1964)*; Newark Bears (1965)
- * Offseason or practice squad member only

Career AFL statistics
- Receptions: 133
- Receiving yards: 1,823
- Touchdowns: 6
- Stats at Pro Football Reference

Eugene Nicholas Prebola (June 30, 1938 – December 10, 2021) was an American professional football tight end who played four seasons in the American Football League (AFL) with the Oakland Raiders and Denver Broncos. He played college football at Boston University.

== Early life ==
Eugene Nicholas Prebola was born on June 30, 1938, in The Bronx. He attended Memorial High School in West New York, New Jersey. He was inducted into the Hudson County Sports Hall of Fame in 1997.

== College career ==
Prebola was a member of the Boston University Terriers of Boston University from 1956 to 1959 and was a three-year letterman from 1957 to 1959. He earned first-team All-New England and honorable mention All-East honors. He also played basketball for the Terriers during the 1957–58 season, appearing in 12 contests while averaging 1.7 points and 1.1 rebounds per game. Prebola was inducted into the Boston University Hall of Fame in 1991.

== Professional career ==
Prebola was selected by the Houston Oilers in the 1960 American Football League draft and by the Detroit Lions in the 19th round, with the 219th overall pick, of the 1960 NFL draft. He chose to sign with the Oilers. However, on March 3, 1960, he was selected by the upstart Oakland Raiders in an allocation draft. On September 25, 1960, Prebola caught the game-deciding touchdown in the franchise's first win, a 14–13 victory over the Oilers. Prebola played in all 14 games, starting ten, for the Raiders during the team's inaugural 1960 season, catching 33 passes for 404 yards and two touchdowns. The Raiders finished the year with a 6–8 record.

On August 10, 1961, Prebola was traded to the Denver Broncos for Willie Smith. Prebola started all 14 games for the Broncos in 1961, recording 29 receptions for 349 yards and one touchdown, as the team went 3–11. He started all 14 games for the second consecutive season in 1962, catching 41 passes for 599 yards and one touchdown. The Broncos finished the 1962 season second in the AFL West with a 7–7 record. Prebola appeared in all 14 games, starting 12, in 1963, totaling 30 catches for 471 yards and two touchdowns as the Broncos finished 2–11–1.

On March 21, 1964, Prebola, Wahoo McDaniel, Gordy Holz, and Bob Zeman were traded to the New York Jets for Dick Guesman, Ed Cooke, Charlie Janerette, Jim Price, and Sid Fournet. Prebola was cut by the Jets on September 1, 1964.

Prebola played for the Newark Bears of the Continental Football League in 1965, catching 14 passes for 189 yards and one touchdown.

== Personal life ==
Prebola and his wife Patricia lived in Sparta, New Jersey and had four children. He was a high school teacher and coach in New Jersey for 32 years. He died on December 10, 2021, in Sparta at the age of 83.
