= George Fields (American football) =

American football player

No. 80
- Position: Defensive lineman

Personal information
- Born: 1935 or 1936 (age 90–91)
- Listed height: 6 ft 3 in (1.91 m)
- Listed weight: 245 lb (111 kg)

Career information
- High school: Berkeley
- College: Bakersfield Junior College

Career history
- Oakland Raiders (1960–1961)
- Stats at Pro Football Reference

George Fields (born 1935 or 1936) is an American former professional football player who was a defensive lineman for two seasons with the Oakland Raiders of the American Football League (AFL). He played college football at Bakersfield Junior College.
