= Dalton Truax =

American football player (1935–2019)

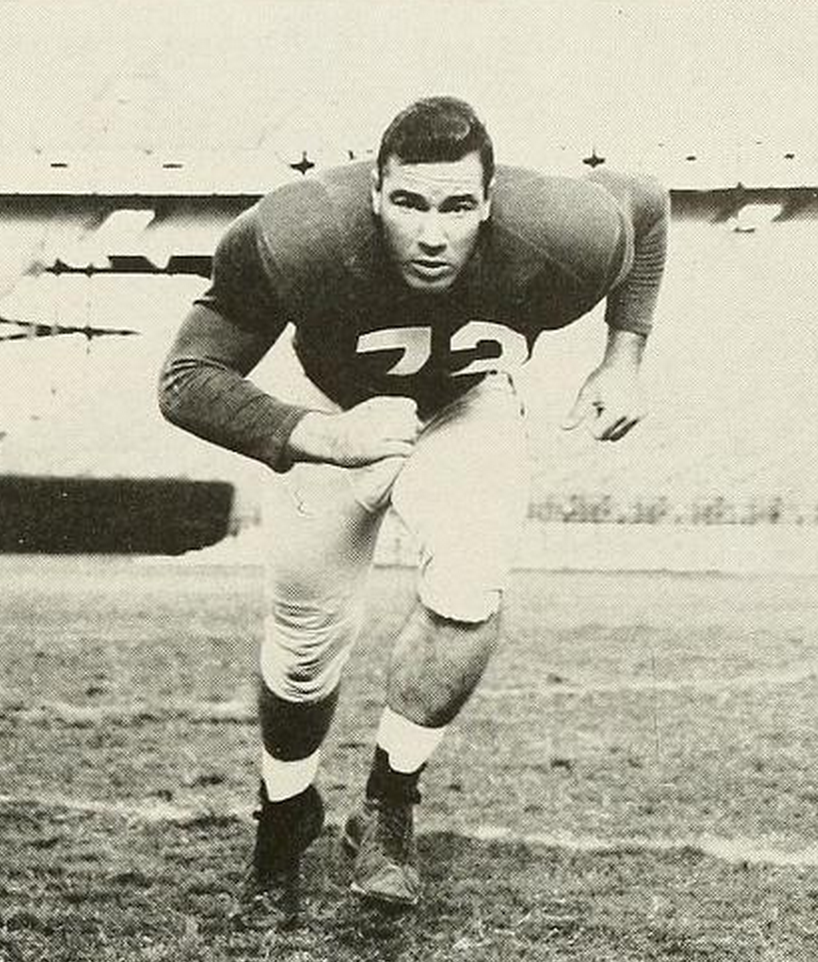
- Truax pictured circa 1957 at Tulane

No. 72
- Position: Tackle

Personal information
- Born: January 17, 1935; New Orleans, Louisiana, U.S.
- Died: August 15, 2019 (aged 84); Kenner, Louisiana, U.S.
- Listed height: 6 ft 2 in (1.88 m)
- Listed weight: 236 lb (107 kg)

Career information
- High school: Holy Cross (LA)
- College: Tulane
- NFL draft: 1957: 3rd round, 29th overall pick

Career history
- Green Bay Packers (1957); New York Giants (1957–1958); Oakland Raiders (1960)

Awards and highlights
- Second-team All-SEC (1956)

Career NFL statistics
- Games played: 14
- Stats at Pro Football Reference

Dalton Lloyd Truax Jr. (January 17, 1935 – August 15, 2019) was an American professional football player. After growing up in New Orleans and lettering in multiple sports for Holy Cross School (New Orleans) including becoming Louisiana State Wrestling Heavyweight Champ, he went on an athletic scholarship to Tulane University. Shortly before the 1957 season, the Green Bay Packers traded him to the New York Giants for a 1958 third-round selection in which they chose future Hall of Famer Ray Nitschke. He played for the Oakland Raiders during the 1960 AFL season. He died at his home in 2019, aged 84.
