= Billy Lott =

American football player (1934–1995)

No. 22, 31, 32
- Position: Running back

Personal information
- Born: November 8, 1934; Sumrall, Mississippi, U.S.
- Died: May 20, 1995 (aged 60)
- Listed height: 6 ft 0 in (1.83 m)
- Listed weight: 203 lb (92 kg)

Career information
- High school: Sumrall
- College: Mississippi (1954–1957)
- NFL draft: 1958: 6th round, 70th overall pick

Career history
- New York Giants (1958); Oakland Raiders (1960); Boston Patriots (1961–1963)

Career NFL/AFL statistics
- Rushing yards: 1,123
- Rushing average: 4.6
- Receptions: 85
- Receiving yards: 919
- Total touchdowns: 20
- Stats at Pro Football Reference

Billy Rex Lott (November 8, 1934 – May 20, 1995) was a professional American football running back who played in the National Football League (NFL) and the American Football League (AFL). He played for the NFL's New York Giants (1958) and the AFL's Oakland Raiders (1960) and Boston Patriots (1961–1963).
