= Bob Garner =

American football player (1934–1990)

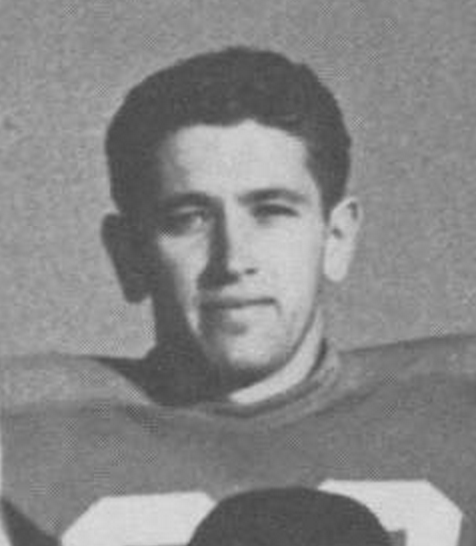
- Garner at Fresno State, c. 1957

No. 35, 28
- Position: Defensive back

Personal information
- Born: September 26, 1934; Anadarko, Oklahoma
- Died: June 25, 1990 (aged 55); El Paso, Texas
- Listed height: 5 ft 10 in (1.78 m)
- Listed weight: 189 lb (86 kg)

Career information
- High school: Hanford
- College: Fresno State

Career history
- Los Angeles Chargers (1960); Oakland Raiders (1961–1962)
- Stats at Pro Football Reference

Robert Lee Garner (September 26, 1934 – June 25, 1990) was an American football player who played with the Los Angeles Chargers and Oakland Raiders. He played college football at California State University, Fresno. His hometown was Hanford, California.
