= Charley Fuller =

American football player (1939–2001)

No. 20, 25
- Position: Running back

Personal information
- Born: January 22, 1939; Vicksburg, Mississippi, U.S.
- Died: July 30, 2001 (aged 62); Oakland, California, U.S.
- Listed height: 5 ft 11 in (1.80 m)
- Listed weight: 175 lb (79 kg)

Career information
- High school: Vallejo (Vallejo, California)
- College: San Francisco State
- NFL draft: 1961: 16th round, 220th overall pick
- AFL draft: 1961: 19th round, 147th overall pick

Career history
- Oakland Raiders (1961–1962); San Jose Apaches (1967)

Awards and highlights
- Second-team All-Pacific Coast (1960)

Career AFL statistics
- Rushing yards: 134
- Rushing average: 3.5
- Receptions: 17
- Receiving yards: 344
- Total touchdowns: 2
- Stats at Pro Football Reference

Charles Earl Fuller (January 22, 1939 — July 30, 2001) was an American professional football player who was a running back in the American Football League (AFL). He played college football for the San Francisco State Gators.

== Early life ==
Fuller was born in Vicksburg, Mississippi but grew up in Vallejo, California and attended Vallejo High School. He initially was the backup to future Pro Bowl running back Dick Bass.

== College career ==
Fuller began his collegiate career at Vallejo Junior College before transferring to San Francisco State. As a senior, Fuller rushed for 463 yards and caught 12 passes for 225 yards and was named Little All-America by the Associated Press. He set a school record with 190 rushing yards.

== Professional career ==
Fuller was selected by the San Francisco 49ers in the 16th round of the 1961 NFL draft and by the Oakland Raiders in the 19th round of the 1961 AFL draft. He signed with the 49ers but was cut during training camp and was signed by the Raiders after being released. Fuller was waived by the Raiders on October 2, 1962. In 1967, Fuller played for the San Jose Apaches of the Continental Football League.
