= Hal Smith (American football) =

American football player (born 1935)

No. 70, 72
- Position: Defensive tackle

Personal information
- Born: October 3, 1935 (age 91); Santa Monica, California, U.S.
- Listed height: 6 ft 5 in (1.96 m)
- Listed weight: 250 lb (113 kg)

Career information
- High school: Canoga Park (Los Angeles, California)
- College: UCLA
- NFL draft: 1957: 18th round, 214th overall pick

Career history
- Pittsburgh Steelers (1958)*; Los Angeles Chargers (1960)*; Denver Broncos (1960); Boston Patriots (1960); Oakland Raiders (1961)
- * Offseason or practice squad member only

Awards and highlights
- Second-team All-PCC (1956)
- Stats at Pro Football Reference

Harold Wallace Smith Jr. (born October 3, 1935) is an American former professional football player who was a defensive tackle with the Boston Patriots, Denver Broncos, and Oakland Raiders of the American Football League (AFL). He played college football for the UCLA Bruins.
