= Jack Larscheid =

American football player (1933–1980)

No. 23
- Position: Halfback/Punt Returner/Kick Returner

Personal information
- Born: May 10, 1933; Whitefish Bay, Wisconsin, U.S.
- Died: February 5, 1980 (aged 46); Sacramento, California, U.S.
- Listed height: 5 ft 6 in (1.68 m)
- Listed weight: 162 lb (73 kg)

Career information
- High school: Riverside University (WI)
- College: Pacific

Career history
- Oakland Raiders (1960–1961)

Career statistics
- Games played: 16
- Stats at Pro Football Reference

Jack Larscheid (May 10, 1933 – February 5, 1980) was a player in the American Football League (AFL) for the Oakland Raiders in 1960 and 1961 as a halfback. He played at the collegiate level at University of the Pacific.

== Biography ==
Larscheid was born John Phillip Larscheid on May 10, 1933, in Whitefish Bay, Wisconsin. Some sources have listed him as dying in 1970, but the Social Security Death Index indicates he died in 1980, not 1970.
