= Ray Armstrong =

American football player (born 1937)

No. 66
- Position: Defensive tackle

Personal information
- Born: October 6, 1937 (age 89); Ennis, Texas, U.S.
- Listed height: 6 ft 1 in (1.85 m)
- Listed weight: 235 lb (107 kg)

Career information
- High school: Ennis
- College: TCU
- NFL draft: 1960: 20th round, 236th overall pick
- AFL draft: 1960

Career history
- Oakland Raiders (1960)

Career AFL statistics
- Sacks: 4
- Stats at Pro Football Reference

Ramon Lee Armstrong (born October 6, 1937) is an American former professional football player who was a defensive tackle for the Oakland Raiders of the American Football League (AFL). He played college football for the TCU Horned Frogs and played in the AFL for the Raiders in 1960.

== See also ==
- List of American Football League players
