= Jim Brewington =

American football player (1939–2012)

No. 73
- Position: Offensive tackle

Personal information
- Born: February 25, 1939 (age 87); Greenville, North Carolina, U.S.
- Listed height: 6 ft 6 in (1.98 m)
- Listed weight: 280 lb (127 kg)

Career information
- College: North Carolina Central
- NFL draft: 1961: 17th round, 236th overall pick

Career history
- Oakland Raiders (1961)

Career AFL statistics
- Games played: 14
- Games started: 6
- Stats at Pro Football Reference

James Wilson "Champ" Brewington (born 1939) was an American professional football player. He played for the Oakland Raiders of the American Football League (AFL) during the 1961 AFL season. He was drafted in the 17th round of the 1961 NFL Draft with the 236th overall pick by the Green Bay Packers.
