= Cliff Roberts =

American football player

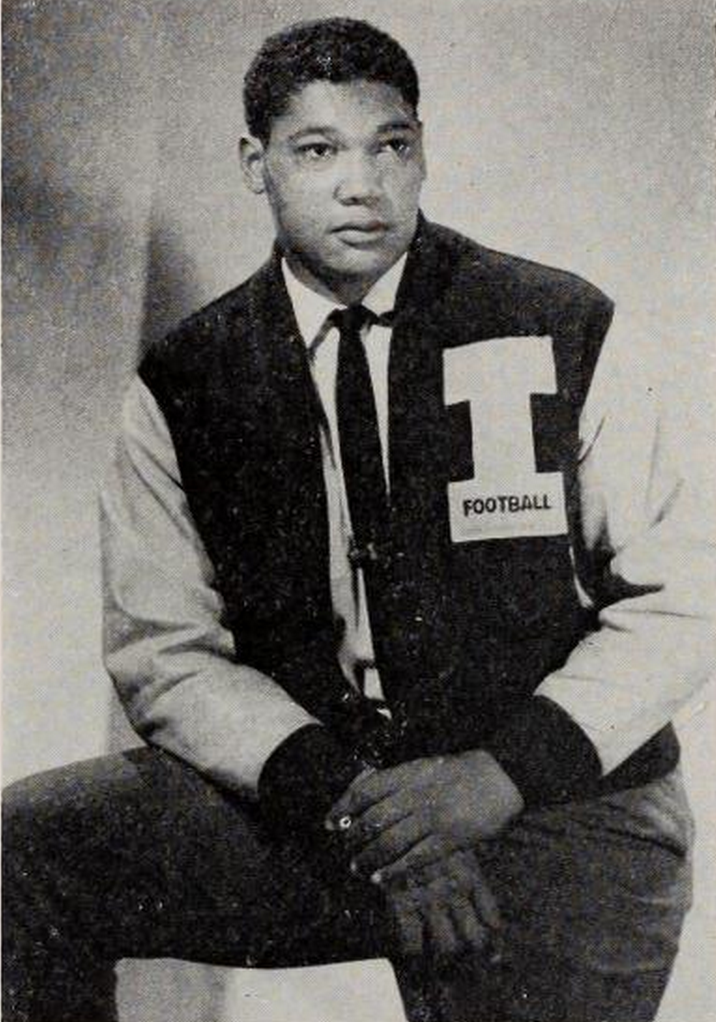
- Roberts pictured c. 1961 at the University of Illinois

No. 71
- Position: Tackle

Personal information
- Born: 1933 or 1934; Philadelphia, Pennsylvania, U.S.
- Listed height: 6 ft 3 in (1.91 m)
- Listed weight: 260 lb (118 kg)

Career information
- High school: Murrall Dobbins Vocational
- College: Illinois
- AFL draft: 1961: 6th round, 48th overall pick

Career history
- Oakland Raiders (1961)
- Stats at Pro Football Reference

Clifford Ubert Roberts Jr. (born 1933 or 1934) was an American professional football player who was an offensive lineman for one season for the Oakland Raiders. He was born in Philadelphia and was a sergeant in the United States Marine Corps, having served upon his graduation from high school. He studied radio and television at the University of Illinois, where he also played college football.
