= Gary Finneran (American football) =

American football player (born 1934)

No. 76
- Position: Defensive end

Personal information
- Born: February 23, 1934 (age 92); Los Angeles, California, U.S.
- Listed height: 6 ft 3 in (1.91 m)
- Listed weight: 240 lb (109 kg)

Career information
- High school: Cathedral (Los Angeles)
- College: USC

Career history
- Los Angeles Chargers (1960); Oakland Raiders (1961)

Awards and highlights
- Second-team All-PCC (1959)

Career statistics
- Games played: 26
- Stats at Pro Football Reference

Gary Joseph Finneran (born February 23, 1934) is an American former professional football player who was a defensive end with the Los Angeles Chargers and Oakland Raiders of the American Football League (AFL). He played college football for the USC Trojans.
