= Donald R. Deskins Jr. =

American football player and professor (1932–2013)

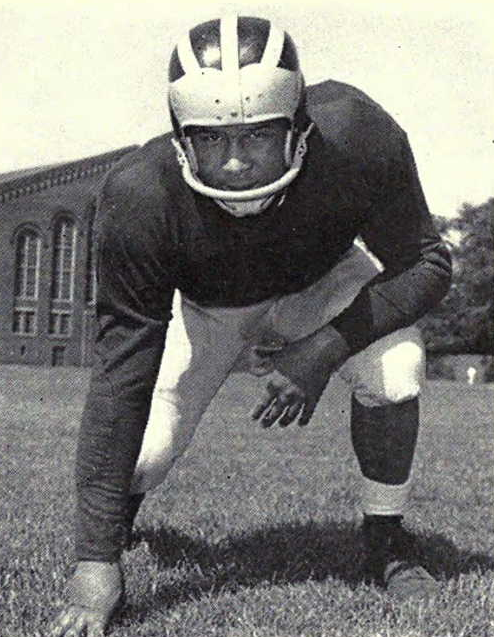
- Deskins in Michigan football uniform, 1959

No. 79
- Positions: Guard, Defensive tackle

Personal information
- Born: May 10, 1932; Brooklyn, New York, U.S.
- Died: February 26, 2013 (aged 80); Ann Arbor, Michigan, U.S.
- Listed height: 6 ft 3 in (1.91 m)
- Listed weight: 240 lb (109 kg)

Career information
- High school: Westbury (NY)
- College: Michigan
- AFL draft: 1960

Career history
- Oakland Raiders (1960)
- Stats at Pro Football Reference

Donald Richard Deskins Jr. (May 10, 1932 – February 26, 2013) was an American professor of urban geography and sociology and a former American football player. He was born in Brooklyn, New York, in 1932 and attended Westbury High School. He served in the United States Marine Corps before enrolling at the University of Michigan in 1957. He received several degrees from the University of Michigan, including a Bachelor of Arts degree in 1960, a Master of Arts degree in 1963, and a Ph.D. in 1971. During his undergraduate study at Michigan, Deskins played college football as a tackle for the Michigan Wolverines football teams in 1958 and 1959. After receiving his bachelor's degree in 1960, he played professional football for the Oakland Raiders in their inaugural season in the American Football League. Deskins has published extensively. His works include:

- Letters to President Obama (2009), co-authored with Hanes Walton and Josephine A. V. Allen
- Presidential Elections, 1789–2008, co-authored with Hanes Walton and Sherman Puckett
- Residential mobility of Negroes in Detroit, 1837-1965 (1972)
- Negro settlement in Ann Arbor (1962)
- Interaction patterns and the spatial form of the ghetto (1970), co-authored with David Ward and Harold M. Rose
- Geographical literature on the American Negro, 1949-1968 (1969)
