= Joe Cannavino =

American gridiron football player (born 1935)

No. 27, 19
- Position: Defensive back

Personal information
- Born: January 20, 1935 (age 91); Cleveland, Ohio, U.S.
- Listed height: 5 ft 11 in (1.80 m)
- Listed weight: 185 lb (84 kg)

Career information
- High school: Collinwood (Cleveland)
- College: Ohio State
- NFL draft: 1957: 16th round, 185th overall pick

Career history
- Cleveland Browns (1959)*; Oakland Raiders (1960–1961); Buffalo Bills (1962); Hamilton Tiger-Cats (1963)
- * Offseason or practice squad member only

Awards and highlights
- Grey Cup champion (1963)

Career AFL statistics
- Interceptions: 10
- Sacks: 2
- Stats at Pro Football Reference

Joseph Patrick Cannavino (born January 20, 1935) was an American and Canadian football player who played for the Hamilton Tiger-Cats, Oakland Raiders and Buffalo Bills. He won the Grey Cup with the Tiger-Cats in 1963. He went to Collinwood high-school in Ohio. He played college football at Ohio State University and was drafted in the 1957 NFL draft by the Baltimore Colts (Round 16, #185 overall).
