= Charlie Hardy (American football) =

American football player (1933–2001)

Profile
- Position: End

Personal information
- Born: November 7, 1933; Monroe, Louisiana, U.S.
- Died: May 9, 2001 (aged 67)
- Listed height: 6 ft 0 in (1.83 m)
- Listed weight: 183 lb (83 kg)

Career information
- High school: Oakland Technical (Oakland, California)
- College: San Jose State
- NFL draft: 1955: undrafted

Career history
- Oakland Raiders (1960–1962)

Career NFL statistics
- Receptions: 54
- Receiving yards: 840
- Receiving touchdowns: 7
- Stats at Pro Football Reference

Charlie Hardy (November 7, 1933 – May 9, 2001) was a gridiron football end who played in the American Football League (AFL). He played college football at San Jose State.

== Early life in high school ==
Hardy was born in Monroe, Louisiana, but grew up in Oakland, California, and attended Oakland Technical High School.

== College career ==
Hardy was a two year starter at end for the San Jose State Spartans. As a senior, he tied for the team lead with 13 receptions and was awarded the Mr. Downfield Award as the team's best downfield blocker. He was inducted into the school's Hall of Fame upon graduating.

== Professional career ==
Hardy went unselected in the 1955 NFL draft and despite several tryouts was not signed by any team initially. He was signed by the San Francisco 49ers in 1958 but was cut during training camp. He was signed by the newly-formed Oakland Raiders and was named a starter going into the team's inaugural season. He finished the year as Oakland's second leading receiver with 24 receptions for 424 yards and three touchdowns. Hardy was cut by the Raiders midway through the 1962 season. Hardy caught 54 passes for 840 yards and seven touchdowns in 33 games in his professional career.
