= Herm Urenda =

American football player (1938–2019)

Herman J. Urenda (April 24, 1938 – August 7, 2019) was an American college and professional football player. A wide receiver, he played college football at the University of the Pacific, and played professionally in the American Football League for the Oakland Raiders in 1963.

== See also ==
- Other American Football League players
