= Bob Dougherty =

American football player (1932–2006)

No. 57, 63, 44
- Position: Linebacker

Personal information
- Born: April 20, 1932; Bellevue, Kentucky, U.S.
- Died: May 12, 2006 (aged 74); Edgewood, Kentucky, U.S.
- Listed height: 6 ft 1 in (1.85 m)
- Listed weight: 240 lb (109 kg)

Career information
- High school: Bellevue
- College: Kentucky; Cincinnati
- NFL draft: 1954: 20th round, 238th overall pick

Career history
- Los Angeles Rams (1957); Pittsburgh Steelers (1958); Oakland Raiders (1960-1963)

Career NFL/AFL statistics
- Interceptions: 3
- Sacks: 5
- Stats at Pro Football Reference

Robert William Dougherty (April 20, 1932 – May 12, 2006) was an American professional football linebacker in the National Football League (NFL) and the American Football League (AFL). He played for the NFL's Los Angeles Rams (1957) and Pittsburgh Steelers (1958), and the AFL's Oakland Raiders (1960–1963).
