= Charley Powell =

American multi-sport professional sportsman (1932–2014)

Charlie Powell
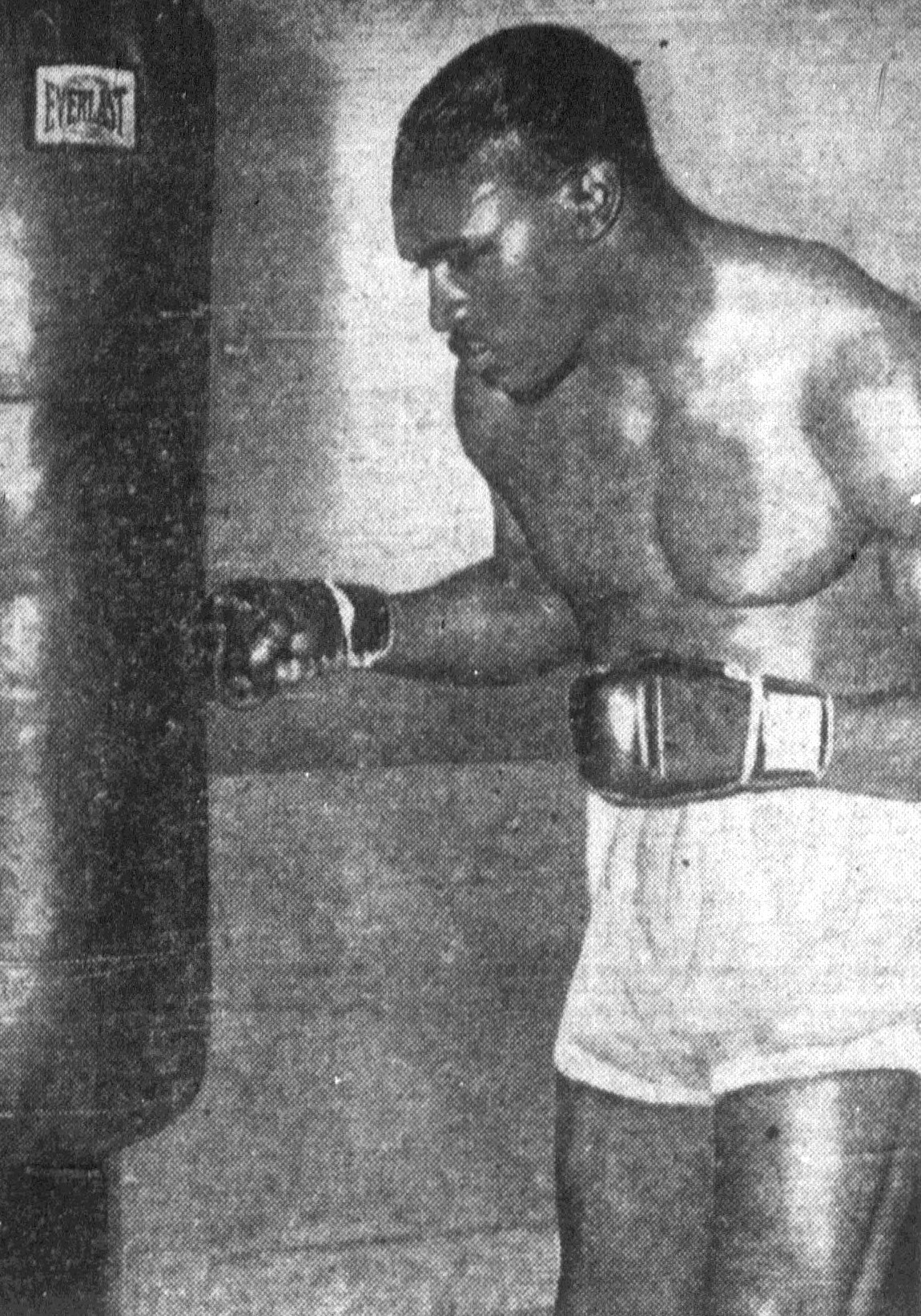
- Powell, circa 1954

Profile
- Position: DL

Personal information
- Born: April 4, 1932; Dallas, Texas, U.S.
- Died: September 1, 2014 (aged 82); San Diego, California, U.S.

Career information
- College: none

Career history
- 1952–1957: San Francisco 49ers
- 1960–1961: Oakland Raiders
- Stats at Pro Football Reference

Charles Elvin Powell (April 4, 1932 – September 1, 2014) was an American multi-sport professional sportsman as an National Football League (NFL) football player, professional boxer (who fought champions Muhammad Ali and Floyd Patterson), and Minor League baseball player.

== Early life ==
Powell was born in Dallas on April 4, 1932. He and his younger brother Art Powell (a future NFL wide receiver who played for the New York Titans and Oakland Raiders in the 1960s) grew up in the Logan Heights area of San Diego, California.

== High school ==
Charlie starred in football, basketball, track and baseball at San Diego High School. In 1950, as a 6'-3", 230-pound defensive end and offensive end, with tremendous power and speed, he was named the California high school football player of the year. In track, he ran 100 yards in 9.6 seconds and threw the shot put 57 feet 9¼ inches. In basketball, he was a second-team all-league center. As a high school baseball player, he hit balls out of San Diego Balboa Stadium. He turned down an offer of a tryout by the Harlem Globetrotters.

== Baseball career ==
After high school, Charlie was recruited by Notre Dame and UCLA to play football, St. Louis Browns baseball owner Bill Veeck, who had acquired the legendary pitcher Satchel Paige from the Cleveland Indians, signed the power-hitting outfielder to a professional baseball contract. He was sent to the Stockton Ports, a Class B minor league team.

== Football career ==
But after playing pro baseball in the summer of 1952, Charlie suddenly abandoned his pro baseball career and signed a pro football contract with the San Francisco 49ers. At 19, he became the youngest player in NFL history. In his first game, he started against the NFL champion Detroit Lions and had multiple sacks against QB Bobby Layne, totalling 67 yards in sack yardage.

Powell played five seasons in the NFL for the 49ers (1952–53 and 1955–57) and two for the Oakland Raiders (1960–61).

== Boxing career ==
Powell was also a professional boxer. In March 1959, on television, he knocked out Nino Valdes of Cuba who was the number 2 ranked heavyweight fighter in the world at the time. He fought Muhammad Ali (who was then known as Cassius Clay) at the Civic Arena in Pittsburgh on January 24, 1963. Ali knocked out Powell in the third round, as Ali predicted before the fight. He finished his pro boxing career with a record of 25–11–3. In his career, Charlie also fought Floyd Patterson, losing to him in 6 rounds.

== Retirement ==
Powell is a member of the Breitbard San Diego Hall of Fame. He was last known to be living in the Pasadena, California area.

== Death ==
Powell died on September 1, 2014, aged 82, after living with dementia for several years.
