= Tom Louderback =

American football player (1933–2020)

No. 61, 60, 54
- Positions: Linebacker, center, guard

Personal information
- Born: March 5, 1933; Petaluma, California, U.S.
- Died: December 8, 2020 (aged 87); Reno, Nevada, U.S.
- Listed height: 6 ft 2 in (1.88 m)
- Listed weight: 235 lb (107 kg)

Career information
- High school: Petaluma
- College: San Jose State (1951–1954)
- NFL draft: 1955: 10th round, 111th overall pick

Career history
- Hamilton Tiger-Cats (1955); Cleveland Browns (1958)*; Philadelphia Eagles (1958–1959); Oakland Raiders (1960-1961); Buffalo Bills (1962)
- * Offseason or practice squad member only

Awards and highlights
- Second-team All-PCC (1954)

Career NFL/AFL statistics
- Interceptions: 3
- Fumble recoveries: 1
- Total touchdowns: 1
- Stats at Pro Football Reference

Thomas Franklin Louderback Jr. ( March 5, 1933 - December 8, 2020) was an American professional football linebacker in the National Football League (NFL) for the Philadelphia Eagles. He also played in the American Football League (AFL) for the Oakland Raiders and Buffalo Bills. Louderback played college football at San José State University and was drafted 111th overall in the tenth round of the 1955 NFL draft by the Washington Redskins.
