= John Harris (defensive back) =

American football player (born 1933)

No. 29
- Position: Defensive back

Personal information
- Born: May 7, 1933; San Antonio, Texas, U.S.
- Died: March 30, 2026 (aged 92)
- Listed height: 6 ft 1 in (1.85 m)
- Listed weight: 195 lb (88 kg)

Career information
- High school: St. Peter Claver
- College: Santa Monica

Career history
- Oakland Raiders (1960–1961)
- Stats at Pro Football Reference

John Hiram Harris (May 7, 1933 - March 30, 2026) was an American former professional football player who was a defensive back with the Oakland Raiders, Saskatchewan Roughriders and with three teams in the Continental Football League. He played college football at Santa Monica College.
