= Doug Asad =

American football player (born 1938)

No. 83
- Position: Tight end

Personal information
- Born: August 27, 1938 (age 88); Fairview Park, Ohio, U.S.
- Listed height: 6 ft 2 in (1.88 m)
- Listed weight: 205 lb (93 kg)

Career information
- High school: Fairview (Fairview Park)
- College: Northwestern

Career history
- Oakland Raiders (1960–1961)

Career statistics
- Games played: 27
- Receptions: 56
- Receiving yards: 789
- Touchdowns: 3
- Stats at Pro Football Reference

Douglas Samuel Asad (born August 27, 1938) is an American former professional football player who was a tight end or the Oakland Raiders of the American Football League (AFL) in 1960 and 1961. Asad played high school football at Fairview High School in Fairview Park, Ohio, and he played college football for the Northwestern Wildcats.
