= Tony Teresa =

American gridiron football player (1933–1984)

No. 26, 25
- Position: Halfback

Personal information
- Born: December 8, 1933; Pittsburg, California, U.S.
- Died: October 16, 1984 (aged 50)

Career information
- College: San Jose State

Career history
- BC Lions (1956–1957); San Francisco 49ers (1958); Oakland Raiders (1960)

Career statistics
- Rushing attempts-yards: 139-608
- Receptions-yards: 35-393
- Touchdowns: 10
- Stats at Pro Football Reference

Anthony Michael Teresa (December 8, 1933 – October 16, 1984) was an American football halfback. He played college football for San Jose State, then played professionally in the Canadian Football League (CFL), National Football League (NFL), and American Football League (AFL).

Following his college career at San Jose State, Teresa played quarterback in the CFL for the BC Lions in 1956 and 1957. He completed 35.8% of his 67 passes for 371 yards. In 1958, Teresa played one game for the NFL's San Francisco 49ers. He later played one season for the AFL's Oakland Raiders. He was the first player to score a touchdown for the Raiders franchise. In the Raiders' inaugural season, Teresa led the team in rushing touchdowns and receiving touchdowns, and threw one touchdown pass.
