= Wayne Crow =

American football player (born 1938)

No. 22
- Positions: Halfback, defensive back, punter

Personal information
- Born: May 5, 1938 (age 88); Coolidge, Arizona, U.S.
- Listed height: 6 ft 1 in (1.85 m)
- Listed weight: 205 lb (93 kg)

Career information
- College: California
- NFL draft: 1960: 8th round, 85th overall pick

Career history
- Oakland Raiders (1960-1961); Buffalo Bills (1962-1963); St. Louis Cardinals (1964)*; Hartford Charter Oaks (1966)
- * Offseason or practice squad member only

Career AFL statistics
- Rushing yards: 1,085
- Rushing average: 4.6
- Receptions: 30
- Receiving yards: 254
- Total touchdowns: 4
- Stats at Pro Football Reference

Charles Wayne Crow (born May 5, 1938) is an American former professional football player who was a running back in the American Football League (AFL). After playing college football for the California Golden Bears as a quarterback, he played in the AFL for four seasons as a running back and punter for the Oakland Raiders and Buffalo Bills . In October 1961, he kicked a 77-yard punt to set a Raider record that wasn't broken until 50 years later, when Shane Lechler kicked an 80-yard punt in November 2011—two months after having tied Crow's record.

== See also ==
- Other American Football League players
