= Larry Barnes (fullback) =

American football player (1931–2016)

No. 35, 52
- Position: Fullback

Personal information
- Born: October 6, 1931; Sterling, Colorado, U.S.
- Died: May 14, 2016 (aged 84); Colorado Springs, Colorado, U.S.
- Listed height: 6 ft 1 in (1.85 m)
- Listed weight: 228 lb (103 kg)

Career information
- High school: Sterling
- College: Colorado State (1955–1956)
- NFL draft: 1956: 7th round, 75th overall pick

Career history
- San Francisco 49ers (1957); Oakland Raiders (1960)

Career NFL/AFL statistics
- Rushing yards: 78
- Rushing average: 3.9
- Receptions: 1
- Receiving yards: 1
- Stats at Pro Football Reference

Larry Edward Barnes (October 6, 1931 – May 14, 2016) was an American football player. He played with the San Francisco 49ers and Oakland Raiders. He played college football at Colorado State University. Barnes was also an Army veteran and high school history teacher.
