= Ron Sabal =

American football player (born 1936)

No. 64
- Positions: Tackle, guard

Personal information
- Born: July 23, 1936 (age 90); Chicago, Illinois, U.S.
- Listed height: 6 ft 3 in (1.91 m)
- Listed weight: 245 lb (111 kg)

Career information
- High school: St. Rita of Cascia (Chicago)
- College: Purdue
- NFL draft: 1958: 19th round, 220th overall pick

Career history
- Oakland Raiders (1960–1961)

Career AFL statistics
- Games played: 28
- Games started: 27
- Stats at Pro Football Reference

Ronald Joseph Sabal (born July 23, 1936) is an American former professional football player who was a tackle for two seasons with the Oakland Raiders of the American Football League (AFL). He played college football for the Purdue Boilermakers.
