= Paul Oglesby =

American football player (1939–1994)

No. 74
- Positions: Offensive tackle, defensive tackle

Personal information
- Born: January 9, 1939; San Francisco, California, U.S.
- Died: September 25, 1994 (aged 55); Riverside, California, U.S.
- Listed height: 6 ft 4 in (1.93 m)
- Listed weight: 235 lb (107 kg)

Career information
- High school: Polytechnic (Riverside)
- College: Riverside CC (1956); UCLA (1957–1959)
- NFL draft: 1960: 10th round, 113th overall pick
- AFL draft: 1960

Career history
- Houston Oilers (1960)*; Oakland Raiders (1960)
- * Offseason or practice squad member only

Career AFL statistics
- Games played: 14
- Games started: 12
- Stats at Pro Football Reference

Paul William Oglesby (January 9, 1939 – September 25, 1994) was an American professional football tackle who played one season with the Oakland Raiders of the American Football League (AFL). Oglesby played college football at Riverside Junior College and the University of California, Los Angeles.

== Early life and college ==
Paul William Oglesby was born on January 9, 1939, in San Francisco, California. He attended Riverside Polytechnic High School in Riverside, California.

Oglesby first played college football at Riverside Junior College in 1956. He was then a three-year letterman for the UCLA Bruins of the University of California, Los Angeles from 1957 to 1959.

== Professional career ==
Oglesby was selected by the St. Louis Cardinals in the tenth round, with the 113th overall pick, of the 1960 NFL draft, and by the Houston Oilers in the 1960 AFL draft. He decided to sign with the Oilers. He was later released on August 1, 1960, after leaving the team.

Oglesby signed with the Oakland Raiders of the AFL on September 8, 1960. He played in all 14 games, starting 12, for the Raiders during the team's inaugural 1960 season. The Raiders finished the year with a 6–8 record. Oglesby was released in 1961.

== Personal life ==
Oglesby died on September 25, 1994, in Riverside.
