= Wayne Hawkins =

American football player (1938–2022)

No. 65
- Position: Guard

Personal information
- Born: June 17, 1938; Fort Peck, Montana, U.S.
- Died: July 25, 2022 (aged 84)
- Listed height: 6 ft 0 in (1.83 m)
- Listed weight: 240 lb (109 kg)

Career information
- High school: Shasta (Redding, California)
- College: Pacific (1956–1959)
- AFL draft: 1960

Career history
- Oakland Raiders (1960–1970)

Awards and highlights
- AFL champion (1967); 5× Second-team All-AFL (1963–1967); 5× AFL All-Star (1963–1967)

Career AFL/NFL statistics
- Games played: 136
- Games started: 104
- Fumble recoveries: 2
- Stats at Pro Football Reference

Wayne Allen Hawkins (June 17, 1938 – July 25, 2022) was an American professional football guard who played for ten seasons in the American Football League (AFL) and the National Football League (NFL). He played for the Oakland Raiders from its founding in 1960 until 1970. He played college football for the Pacific Tigers and was drafted by the Denver Broncos in the AFL's first draft in 1960, he joined the Raiders through the allocation draft before the start of the first AFL season.

== Early life and amateur career ==
Hawkins was born in Fort Peck, Montana, on June 17, 1938. He attended Shasta High School in Redding, California. He enrolled at the University of the Pacific and played college football for the Pacific Tigers.

== Professional career ==
The Denver Broncos selected Hawkins among their first selections in the 1960 AFL draft. However, he was assigned to the Oakland Raiders before the 1960 season. He went on to become one of only twenty AFL players who played in the AFL for entirety of the league's 10-year run.

Hawkins started as right guard for the Raiders from the teams' inception in 1960 thru the 1969 AFL season. He played on the Raiders' taxi squad in 1970, and announced his retirement in 1971. He was later voted to the All-Time Raider team. He earned AFL All-Star honors for five straight years beginning in 1963, and was on the 1967 AFL Champion team that competed in Super Bowl II against the Green Bay Packers. He is a member of the American Football League Hall of Fame.

In Super Bowl II, Hawkins faced off against Jerry Kramer of the Green Bay Packers. Hawkins and Kramer are both from Jordan, Montana, and had the same doctor, while their mothers shared a friendship.

== Later life ==
During the mid-1980s, Hawkins collaborated with fellow former Oakland teammates Bob Svihus and Dave Dalby to author the book, Raider: How Offensive Can You Be? A 25-year History of the Oakland Raiders, published by Peninsula Publishing in Monterey, California.

In the real estate investment business, Hawkins was an avid golfer who supported Caring for Kids, an organization which benefits the Monterey Bay Boys & Girls Clubs and the Children's Miracle Network. Each year, a group of retired professional football players, including many greats from the Pro Football Hall of Fame, compete in the Legends Golf Tournament held annually at The Spanish Bay Inn, Pebble Beach, and Spyglass Hill golf.

On July 28, 2022, The Raiders announces Hawkins's death on July 25.

== See also ==
- List of American Football League players
