= Tom Flores =

American football player, coach and executive (born 1937)

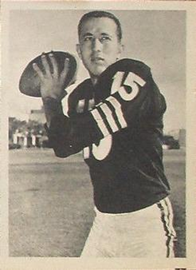
- Flores, circa 1961

No. 15, 16, 12
- Position: Quarterback

Personal information
- Born: March 21, 1937 (age 89); Sanger, California, U.S.
- Listed height: 6 ft 1 in (1.85 m)
- Listed weight: 202 lb (92 kg)

Career information
- High school: Sanger Union
- College: Fresno City (1955–1956); Pacific (1957–1958)
- NFL draft: 1958: undrafted

Career history

Playing
- Bakersfield Spoilers (1958); Oakland Raiders (1960–1966); Buffalo Bills (1967–1969); Kansas City Chiefs (1969)

Coaching
- Buffalo Bills (1971) Quarterbacks coach; Oakland Raiders (1972–1978) Wide receivers coach; Oakland / Los Angeles Raiders (1979–1987) Head coach; Seattle Seahawks (1992–1994) Head coach

Operations
- Seattle Seahawks (1989–1991) President/General manager; Seattle Seahawks (1992–1994) General manager

Awards and highlights
- As a player: Super Bowl champion (IV); AFL All-Star (1966); AFL completion percentage leader (1960); AFL passer rating leader (1960); As a coach: 3× Super Bowl champion (XI, XV, XVIII); UPI NFL Coach of the Year (1982)

Career AFL statistics
- Passing attempts: 1,715
- Passing completions: 838
- Completion percentage: 48.9%
- TD–INT: 93–92
- Passing yards: 11,959
- Passer rating: 67.6
- Rushing yards: 307
- Rushing touchdowns: 5
- Stats at Pro Football Reference

Head coaching record
- Regular season: 97–87 (.527)
- Postseason: 8–3 (.727)
- Career: 108–95 (.532)
- Coaching profile at Pro Football Reference
- Executive profile at Pro Football Reference
- Pro Football Hall of Fame

Thomas Raymond Flores (born March 21, 1937) is an American former professional football player in the American Football League (AFL) and coach in the National Football League (NFL). He played as a quarterback for nine seasons in the AFL, primarily with the Oakland Raiders. After his retirement as a coach, he was a radio announcer for more than twenty years.

Flores won four Super Bowls in his playing and coaching careers. He and Mike Ditka are the only two people in NFL history to win a Super Bowl as a player, assistant coach, and head coach (Flores won Super Bowl IV as a player for the Kansas City Chiefs, Super Bowl XI as an assistant coach of the Raiders, and Super Bowl XV and Super Bowl XVIII as head coach of the Raiders). Flores was also the first NFL starting quarterback of Mexican descent and the first minority head coach in professional football history to win a Super Bowl. Although it may not be officially sourced, Flores is also noted as the only head coach to win a Super Bowl with the same team in two cities in Oakland (1980) and Los Angeles (1983).

From 1997 until 2018, Flores served as an announcer for the Raiders Radio Network. Flores was elected to the Pro Football Hall of Fame in 2021 as a head coach.

== Playing career ==
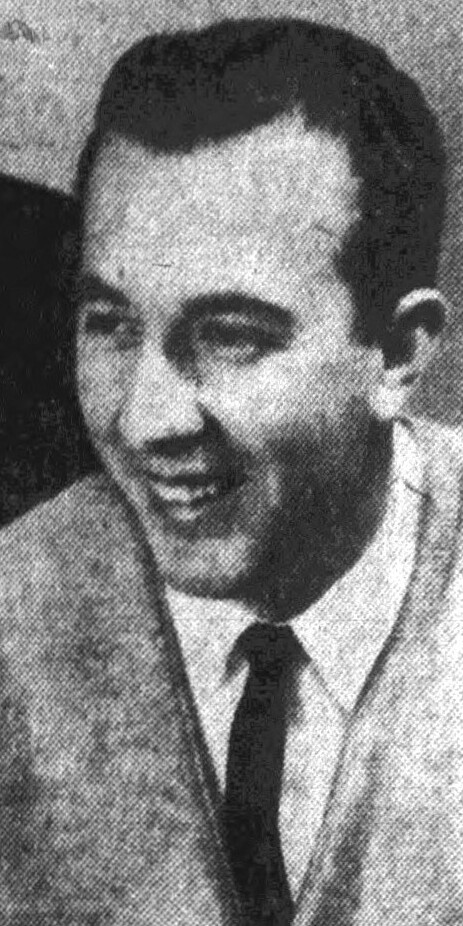
Flores in 1962

Flores played quarterback for two seasons at Fresno City College, beginning in 1955. He was active off the field too, serving on the Student Council and as President of the Associated Men's Students. He received an academic scholarship to study at the College of the Pacific—now known as the University of the Pacific—from which he graduated in 1958. Flores came to Pacific from Fresno City College and started for the Tigers as quarterback. Following his playing career with the Tigers, he was hired as an assistant coach at Pacific and worked toward his master's degree.

Flores was unable to find a job in professional football. He was cut by the Calgary Stampeders of the CFL in 1958, after which he played with the Bakersfield Spoilers (Semi-Pro) football team. A second attempt to break into pro football with the Washington Redskins of the National Football League (NFL) in 1959 also failed. In 1960, Flores finally landed a position as a quarterback with the American Football League's Oakland Raiders, who began play in 1960 as a charter member of the league. He was named the Raiders' starter early that season, becoming the first-ever Hispanic starting quarterback in professional football.

Flores had his most productive season in 1966, passing for 2,638 yards and 24 touchdowns in 14 games. Oakland traded him to the Buffalo Bills in 1967. After serving as Jack Kemp's backup that year, he had a chance to be the Bills' starter when Kemp suffered a season-ending injury during training camp. However, Flores hurt his shoulder before the first game, and his season was limited to a five-pass appearance in week 6. After another five-pass appearance in the first game of 1969, the Bills released Flores and he signed with the Kansas City Chiefs. There he was third-string quarterback behind fellow Hall of Famer Len Dawson and Mike Livingston on the Chiefs' Super Bowl Championship team. He officially retired as a player after not playing a single game in the 1970 season. He was one of only twenty players who were in the AFL for its entire ten-year existence. He is the fifth-leading passer in the AFL's history.

== Coaching career ==
Flores is a member of the Sid Gillman coaching tree. After stints as an assistant coach in Buffalo and Oakland (he won a Super Bowl XI ring as an assistant coach under John Madden), team owner Al Davis promoted Flores to the Raiders' head coaching post in 1979, following Madden's retirement. In 1980, Flores led the Raiders as a wild card playoff team to win the Super Bowl XV championship over the Philadelphia Eagles, 27–10. This was the first wild card team to win the Super Bowl and the only team to win four postseason games en route to a title, until Denver accomplished the same feat in 1997. Flores then moved with the team to Los Angeles in 1982. In the 1983 season Flores led the Raiders to another Super Bowl (XVIII) victory over the Washington Redskins, 38–9. He was named AFC Coach of the year by United Press International and the Football Writers Association in 1982. Flores was the NFL's first minority head coach to win a Super Bowl, winning twice – Super Bowl XV with the Oakland Raiders and Super Bowl XVIII with the Los Angeles Raiders. After a 5–10 finish to the 1987 season, Flores moved to the Raiders' front office but left after just one year. His 83 wins with the Raiders are the second-most in franchise history, behind only Madden. While he appreciated the time spent with the Raiders, Flores once stated that he believed his lack of induction in the Pro Football Hall of Fame was because of the "dominating force" cast by Davis.

On February 22, 1989, Ken Behring (a close friend of Flores) of the Seattle Seahawks hired Flores to serve as team president and general manager after not renewing Mike McCormack's contract. After the 1991 season, head coach Chuck Knox agreed to part ways after meeting with Flores and the owner. Flores had wanted Dennis Erickson (then of the University of Miami) to be the new head coach but Erickson elected to stay with Miami. On January 6, 1992, he appointed himself head coach of the Seahawks. In the offseason, the team elected to move on from Dave Krieg as quarterback that left a roster of Kelly Stouffer, Stan Gelbaugh, and Dan McGwire. The team went from 7–9 the previous year to 2–14, complete with scoring 140 points, the lowest total by a team for an entire 16-game season in NFL history. The one bright spot was Cortez Kennedy, who won the NFL Defensive Player of the Year. The Seahawks elected to go with Rick Mirer at quarterback for 1993 that resulted in a 6–10 campaign where they lost five of their last six games.

The 1994 team started 3–1 but then lost four in a row on the way to a 6–10 finish. Five days after the season ended, on December 29, 1994, the Seahawks fired Flores and his entire staff. Flores left pro football with a lifetime coaching record of 97–87 (52.7%), as well as an 8–3 playoff record, with two Super Bowl victories.

== Post-coaching career ==
From 1997 until 2018, Flores was a color commentator alongside play-by-play announcer Greg Papa for the Raiders Radio Network.

Flores served as coach of the American team in the 2011 NFLPA Collegiate Bowl.

== Personal life ==
In 1961 Flores married Barbara Fridell, whom he met while a student at University of the Pacific. They have twin sons and a daughter, and five grandchildren and one great nephew Adelso Flores.

Sanger High School's football stadium is named Tom Flores Stadium in honor of Flores, who was a graduate of Sanger. He heads the Tom Flores Youth Foundation, which benefits the K-8th grades in the Sanger School district in the fields of art, science, and sports.

Flores graduated from University of the Pacific in 1958. He was the starting quarterback while at Pacific and following his playing career with the Tigers, Flores was hired as an assistant coach at Pacific as he worked toward his master's degree.

Flores holds an honorary doctorate degree from Pepperdine University for humanitarian service.

His biography, Fire in the Iceman, was released in 1992. Flores also coauthored Tales of the Oakland Raiders (2002).

== Head coaching record ==
Team	Year	Regular season					Postseason			
Team	Year	Won	Lost	Ties	Win %	Finish	Won	Lost	Win %	Result
OAK	1979	9	7	0	.563	4th in AFC West	–	–	–	–
OAK	1980	11	5	0	.688	2nd in AFC West	4	0	1.000	Super Bowl XV champions
OAK	1981	7	9	0	.438	4th in AFC West	–	–	–	–
RAI	1982	8	1	0	.889	1st in AFC	1	1	.500	Lost to New York Jets in AFC second round Game
RAI	1983	12	4	0	.750	1st in AFC West	3	0	1.000	Super Bowl XVIII champions
RAI	1984	11	5	0	.688	3rd in AFC West	0	1	.000	Lost to Seattle Seahawks in AFC wild card game
RAI	1985	12	4	0	.750	1st in AFC West	0	1	.000	Lost to New England Patriots in AFC Divisional Game
RAI	1986	8	8	0	.500	4th in AFC West	–	–	–	–
RAI	1987	5	10	0	.333	4th in AFC West	–	–	–	–
OAK/RAI total		83	53	0	.610		8	3	.727	
SEA	1992	2	14	0	.125	5th in AFC West	–	–	–	–
SEA	1993	6	10	0	.375	5th in AFC West	–	–	–	–
SEA	1994	6	10	0	.375	5th in AFC West	–	–	–	–
SEA total		14	34	0	.292		–	–	–	
Total		97	87	0	.527		8	3	.727	

== Awards and honors ==
In 1982, Flores was inducted as a charter member of the University of the Pacific Athletics Hall of Fame. In 1988, he was inducted into the Fresno County Athletic Hall of Fame. In 2007, Flores was inducted into the California Sports Hall of Fame. In 2011, he was also inducted into the California Community College Athletic Association Hall of Fame. In July 2011, Flores received the Roberto Clemente Award for Sports Excellence that is given by the National Council of La Raza for contributions in society by an Hispanic athlete. In 2012, he was also inducted into the Bay Area Sports Hall of Fame. In 2021, Flores was enshrined into the Pro Football Hall of Fame in Canton, Ohio, alongside former Raider Charles Woodson, Peyton Manning and five others.

== See also ==
- List of American Football League players
- List of most consecutive games with touchdown passes in the NFL
- List of NCAA major college football yearly passing leaders
- List of NFL head coach wins leaders
- List of Super Bowl head coaches
