= History of the Buffalo Bills =

Sports team history

The history of the Buffalo Bills began in October of 1959, though their first game was in 1960, when the team began play as a charter member of the American Football League (AFL), winning two consecutive AFL titles in 1964 and 1965. The club joined the National Football League (NFL) as part of the 1970 AFL-NFL merger. The Bills have the distinction of being the only team to advance to four consecutive Super Bowls between 1990 and 1993, but also the regrettable distinction of losing all four of them.

The second NFL team to represent Buffalo, New York, the Bills were founded by Ralph Wilson, who owned the team from its establishment until his death in 2014. Wilson's estate sold the team to Terrence Pegula and his wife Kim later that year.

== Professional football in Buffalo before 1960 ==
The Bills were not the first professional football team to play in Buffalo, nor was it the first NFL team in the region. Professional football had been played in Buffalo and in western New York since the beginning of the 20th century. In 1915, Barney Lepper's "Buffalo All-Stars" were founded; the team would later be replaced by the Niagaras in 1918, then the Prospects in 1919. The Prospects were the basis of what would become the "Buffalo All-Americans," who joined what would become the NFL in 1920. After changing their name to the Bisons in 1924 (and, for one season, the Rangers in 1926), the team suspended operations in 1927, then came back in 1929 and re-folded at the end of that season.

After Buffalo hosted two NFL games in 1938 (a practice that would become a semi-regular occurrence in the city until the current team's arrival), the third American Football League installed the Buffalo Indians in the city; the Indians played two years before the league suspended and ultimately folded due to World War II. After the war, when the All-America Football Conference formed, Buffalo was again selected for a team; originally known as the Buffalo Bisons, the same name as a baseball team and (at the time) a hockey team in the area, the team sought a new identity and named itself the "Buffalo Bills" in 1947. When the AAFC merged with the NFL in 1950, the AAFC Bills were merged into the Cleveland Browns. Though there was no connection between the AAFC team and the current team, the Bills name proved popular enough that it was used as the namesake for the future American Football League team that would form in 1959.

The forerunners to the Canadian Football League would also play at least one game in Buffalo in 1951. For a period in the 1950s, Silas Rooney hosted the Pittsburgh Steelers training camps at Forness Stadium on the campus of St. Bonaventure University, which allowed the team to play an annual exhibition in Buffalo and/or Rochester.

== 1960–1985 ==
=== Bringing pro football back to Buffalo ===
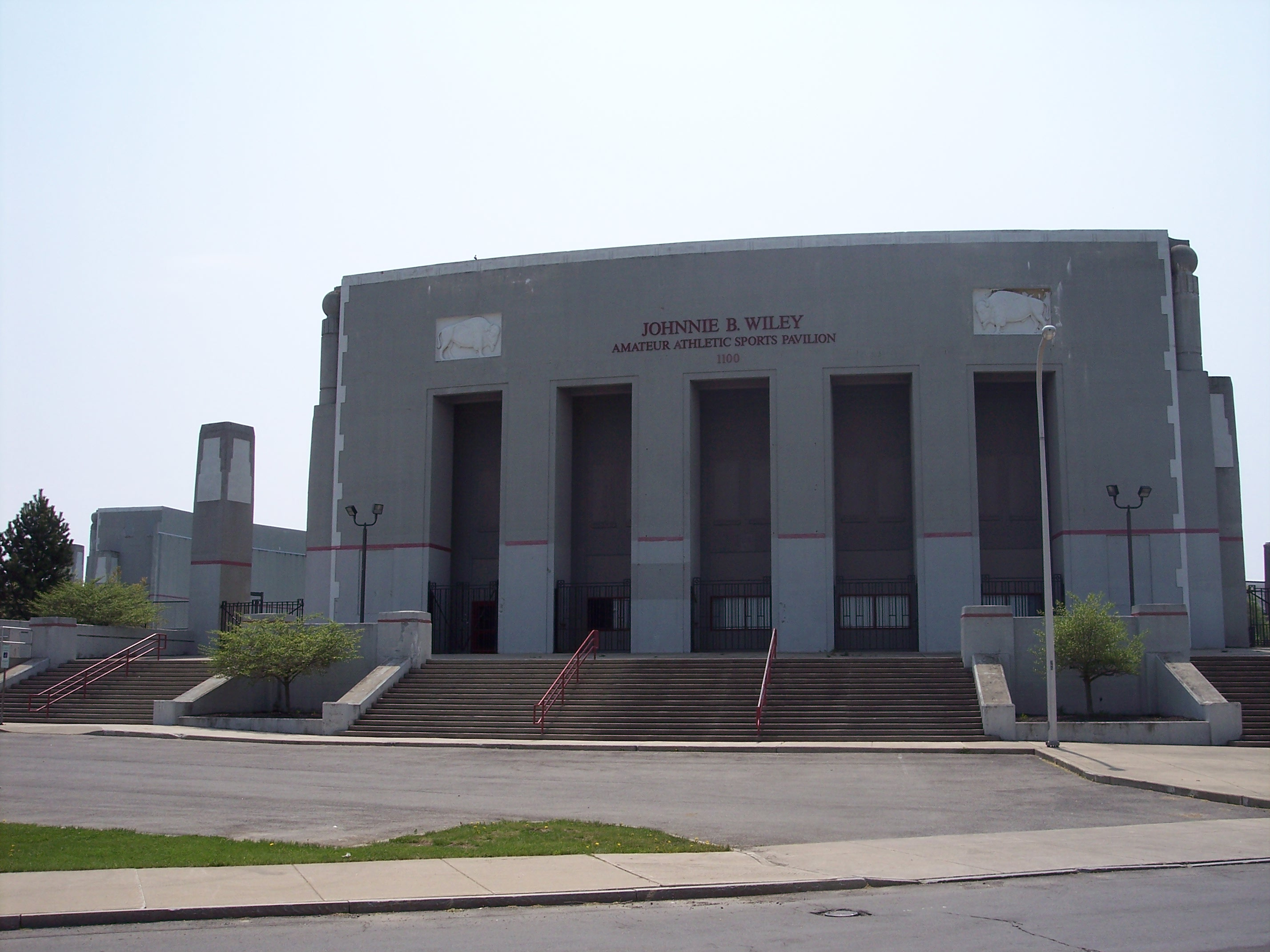
The remains of War Memorial Stadium, used as the home field of the AAFC Bills and the first home for the current team

When Lamar Hunt announced the formation of the American Football League in the summer of 1959, Buffalo was one of the target cities Hunt sought. His first choice of owner, however, turned him down; Pat McGroder (then a liquor store owner and sports liaison with the city of Buffalo) was still hopeful that the threat of the AFL would prompt the NFL to come back to Buffalo to try to stop the AFL from gaining a foothold there (as the NFL would do with teams in Minnesota, Dallas, St. Louis and later Atlanta). McGroder's hopes never came to fruition.

Harry Wismer, who was to own the Titans of New York franchise, reached out to Detroit insurance salesman and automobile heir Ralph C. Wilson Jr. to see if he was interested in joining the upstart league. (Both Wismer and Wilson were minority owners of NFL franchises at the time: Wilson held a stake in the Detroit Lions, while Wismer was a small partner in the Washington Redskins but had little power due to majority owner George Preston Marshall's near-iron fist over the team and the league). Wilson agreed to field a team in the new league, with the words "Count me in. I'll take a franchise anywhere you suggest."

Hunt gave Wilson the choice of six cities: Miami, Buffalo, Cincinnati, St. Louis, Atlanta, or Louisville, Kentucky. Wilson's first choice was Miami, but local officials there were wary of an upstart league after the failure of the All-America Football Conference's Miami Seahawks over a decade prior. They refused to let an AFL team play at the Orange Bowl, and the city had no other venue suitable for even temporary use. Wilson reached out to an acquaintance from his military days in World War II who lived in Buffalo: general contractor George E. Schaaf. Schaaf assured Wilson that pro-football interest was significant in Buffalo and assembled a coalition of key Buffalo figures, including Pat McGroder (a mutual friend of both), who were able to interest Wilson in bringing the AFL franchise to Buffalo. Attorney Paul Crotty (father of Paul A. Crotty and a powerful Buffalo political figure) and McGroder negotiated a sweetheart deal with Civic Stadium in Buffalo—which at the time was primarily an auto racing track but was the only venue with enough seating to accommodate a team (since Offermann Stadium, the city's baseball park and the home of the city's 1920s NFL teams, was undersized, surrounded by residential housing where owners had erected its own rooftop stands allowing spectators to watch the game without paying admission to the teams that played there, and had been condemned by city code enforcement)—and offered Wilson full control of the venue and a deep discount on rent. Wilson promptly removed the racetrack and had Civic Stadium transformed into War Memorial Stadium, which would house both baseball and football. Wilson sent Hunt a telegram with the now-famous words, "Count me in with Buffalo."

Most of Wilson's other choices would receive their own professional football franchises during the AFL's ten-year run. Before the AFL had even played a game, the NFL had responded by moving the moribund Chicago Cardinals to St. Louis, where they would share their nickname with the long-established baseball team. After the AFL established itself, Miami reversed its stance and granted the Miami Dolphins a lease for the city-owned Orange Bowl, where they commenced play in 1966. Meanwhile, the Atlanta Falcons would join the NFL in 1967, while the Cincinnati Bengals would become the AFL's tenth (and final) team in 1968. On the other hand, Louisville has yet to be home to a team in any of the established U.S. major professional sports leagues and would not receive a fully professional football team until the Louisville Kings were established in 2026.

=== 1960–1963: The early AFL years ===
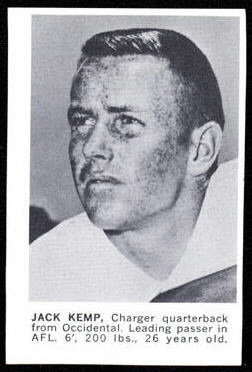
The Bills signed former Chargers quarterback Jack Kemp, who would lead Buffalo to back-to-back AFL Championship titles in the 1960s

The Buffalo Bills were a charter member of the American Football League (AFL) in 1960. After a public contest, the team adopted the same name as the AAFC Buffalo Bills, the former All-America Football Conference team in Buffalo. The AAFC Bills franchise was named after the Buffalo Bills, a popular barbershop quartet, whose name was a play on the name of the famed Wild West showman Buffalo Bill Cody. The franchises are not officially related, other than in name, to each other.

After an inaugural season that saw the Bills finish 5–8–1 (third in the four-team AFL East Division), the Bills gained four of the first five picks in the 1961 AFL draft, including the top slot, which they used to draft offensive tackle Ken Rice. They also drafted guard Billy Shaw in the same draft. Success did not come overnight. On August 8, 1961, the Bills became the first (and only) American Football League team to play a Canadian Football League team, the nearby Hamilton Tiger-Cats. Because of that game, they also hold the dubious distinction of being the only current NFL team to have ever lost to a CFL team, as the Tiger-Cats won, 38–21. Hamilton was one of the best teams in the CFL (they would go on to win the Big Four title but lose in the 49th Grey Cup that year), and Buffalo, at the time, was the worst team in the AFL.

In the 1962 offseason, Buffalo stocked up on players that would play key roles in the successful years of the mid-1960s. Jack Kemp was acquired off waivers from the San Diego Chargers after the Chargers thought Kemp, who had led the Chargers to back-to-back AFL title games, had a bum hand. The Bills also drafted Syracuse running back phenomenon Ernie Davis and had a serious chance of getting him to play for Buffalo after the Redskins, a team Davis refused to play for, drafted him; however, Davis instead opted to play for the NFL after the Redskins traded him to Cleveland, and he died of leukemia before playing a single down of professional football. Instead, the Bills then acquired one of the CFL's top running backs, Cookie Gilchrist.

On December 14, 1963, the Bills and the New York Jets played the final game at the Polo Grounds.

=== The mid-1960s: Four straight playoffs, three division titles, back to back championships ===
From 1963 to 1966, Buffalo experienced its first stretch of success, making the playoffs all four years and winning back-to-back AFL championships in 1964 and 1965 under head coaches Lou Saban through 1965; and Joe Collier in 1966.

The 1964 squad compiled a 12–2 regular season mark and went on to defeat the favored defending AFL champion San Diego Chargers, 20–7 at Buffalo's War Memorial Stadium on December 26, 1964. A turning point in that game occurred in the first quarter with the Chargers ahead 7–0 and driving, when Buffalo linebacker Mike Stratton broke up a flare pass to star Charger halfback Keith Lincoln with a well-timed, hard shot to the ribs, forcing Lincoln to leave the game. This is memorialized in Bills and AFL lore as the "hit heard 'round the world". Players and the fans present acknowledge that the energy in the stadium immediately changed in that instant; San Diego defensive end Earl Faison testifies of the impact it had on the game in this video

Also of note in 1964, the Bills' defense surrendered a mere 65.5 yards rushing per game and started a streak of 16 consecutive regular season games without giving up a rushing touchdown that continued well into the 1965 season (17 if the 1964 championship game is counted); this is still a professional football record as of January 2023. The Bills survived a late-season controversy when star fullback Gilchrist refused to take the field with his teammates at a critical time during a week 10 clash with the (then Boston) Patriots and coach Saban "fired" him off the team; quarterback Kemp, who would go on to the U.S. Congress and to Secretary of Housing and Urban Development under President George H. W. Bush, brokered a reconciliation between Gilchrist and Saban and the fullback rejoined the team days later.

In 1965, Buffalo's offense was hampered all season by injuries to its star receivers Glenn Bass and Elbert (Golden Wheels) Dubenion; additionally, league-leading rusher Gilchrist had been traded to the Denver Broncos. The Bills adjusted, riding their stellar defense and a short, controlled passing game to a 10–3–1 record and a second consecutive AFL Eastern Division title. The team's offensive unit received significant contributions from newly acquired Bills Bo Roberson, Jack Spikes and Billy Joe en route to a championship game rematch with the Chargers, who had smashed Buffalo 34–3 earlier in the season and again were heavily favored. This time, the Bills shut out San Diego's high-powered offense 23–0 on the Chargers' home field, Balboa Stadium. Buffalo cornerback Butch Byrd electrified Bills fans with a 74-yard punt return for a touchdown, and the defense registered five sacks on San Diego's dangerous quarterback, John Hadl.

Buffalo was at the center of one of the most significant events that precipitated the AFL–NFL merger. After the 1965 season, Bills' placekicker Pete Gogolak, who introduced the innovation of kicking "soccer style" to American football instead of approaching the ball head-on, decided to test the free agent market. The NFL's New York Giants were in desperate need of a placekicker, and signed Gogolak away from the AFL. This began the escalation of a bidding war for talent between the two leagues that eventually brought team owners to the negotiating table, resulting in a common draft of players out of college, and the AFL-NFL merger that was completed in 1970.

A big reason for Buffalo's sustained success during the mid-1960s was the team's dominant defensive core roster from 1964 to 1967. Many Bills fans of the era are convinced that linebacker Stratton, cornerback Byrd, tackle Tom Sestak, and end Ron McDole should be enshrined in the Pro Football Hall of Fame. (Currently, the only Buffalo player from the 1960s championship teams in the Hall is offensive guard Shaw). Two defensive reserves of note from the era are linebackers Marty Schottenheimer, who went on to win 200 regular season games as an NFL head coach ranking him eighth all time in that category; and Paul Maguire, the AFL's all-time leader in punting yardage, who went on to a distinguished broadcasting career.

The team faced two significant challenges in 1966: The beginning of coach Saban's 6-year hiatus from Buffalo; and the continuing emergence of a young rival AFL Eastern Division quarterback. Saban's departure to accept a head coaching position at the University of Maryland paved the way for former defensive coach Joe Collier to be promoted to head coach. Collier was regarded as a superior strategist whose personal style contrasted with the oft-fiery Saban. And the New York Jets with their brash young signal-caller and steadily improving supporting cast, were emerging as legitimate challengers. The result was a down-to-the wire race between the Bills and Patriots for the division crown with the Jets nipping at their heels for an opportunity to play an AFL championship game whose winner would finally get a crack at the NFL's champion. The Jets played spoiler by defeating Boston on the last Saturday of the regular season. This opened the door for Buffalo's must-win, 38–21 triumph over the Denver Broncos on the very next day. This gave the Bills their third straight division crown and a championship game at home on January 1, 1967, against the Kansas City Chiefs. The teams had split their regular season meetings but the Chiefs dominated, 31–7 and went on to play the Green Bay Packers for the "World Championship;" since known as the very first Super Bowl.

=== 1967–1971: Lean years with few bright spots ===
Buffalo's first general manager, Dick Gallagher had, in concert with Lou Saban, built the roster that allowed the Bills to rise to prominence in the AFL. Gallagher left the organization after the 1966 season, and subsequent GMs were did not successfully maintain a roster of championship caliber. The trade of backup quarterback Daryle Lamonica to the Oakland Raiders during the off-season leading up to 1967 was the first of many personnel decisions the team made over the next few years that left many Bills fans befuddled. And injuries caught up with the Bills in 1967, especially on the offensive line, and the team slid to a 4–9–1 record. Even tougher years were ahead for the team.

The 1968 season was a tumultuous one. With starter Jack Kemp and backup Tom Flores both injured for most of the season, Buffalo resorted to converting wide receiver Ed Rutkowski to quarterback in a rotation with Rutkowski, Kay Stephenson and Dan Darragh. The result was disastrous, and the Bills dropped to last in the league. Their 1–12–1 final record gave the Bills the first overall draft pick in what was now the combined AFL-NFL draft. The Bills selected O. J. Simpson with their pick.

Offensive lineman Bob Kalsu left the team after his 1968 rookie season to serve in the Vietnam War. He never returned; Kalsu was killed in action in 1970 and is often cited by Bills fans as the first professional football player to die in action in war during his playing career. This is not true, as Young Bussey and Jack Lummus were still of playing age when they left the NFL to serve in World War II and were killed in action a few years later. Kalsu would be one of two NFL players to lose their life in Vietnam.

While the Bills struggled in these years, talent remained on the roster and there were some memorable moments, including Buffalo's lone win in 1968, a 37–35 victory over the eventual Super Bowl champion New York Jets, and a gutty Thanksgiving Day, 1968 performance against the high-flying Oakland Raiders. Players during these years who gave Bills fans sparks of excitement and optimism were Simpson, quarterback Dennis Shaw, wide receivers Haven Moses and Marlin Briscoe, and running back Max Anderson. In 1969 the Bills also drafted Grambling's star James Harris, who earned the Bills' starting quarterback position for a time before going on to more success with the Los Angeles Rams. Harris' success helped to break a de facto racial barrier at the quarterback position.

=== 1972–1977: Saban returns to Turn on "the Juice:" The "Electric Company" era ===
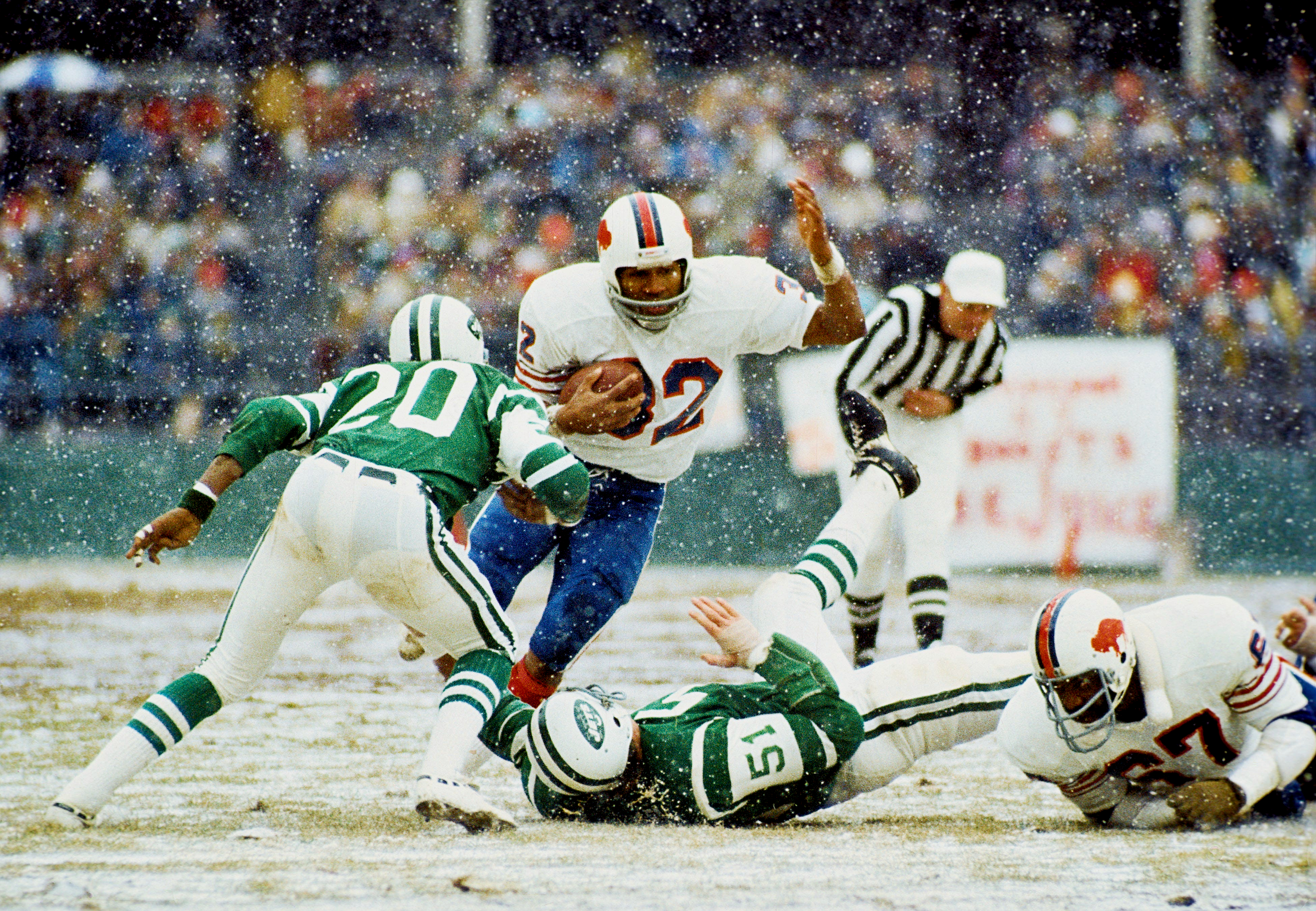
O. J. Simpson, the face of the Bills franchise for most of the 1970s, pictured breaking the NFL's single-season rushing record in 1973.

Before the 1969 season, the Bills drafted running back O. J. Simpson, who would become the face of the franchise through the 1970s. The NFL-AFL merger placed Buffalo in the AFC East division with the Patriots, Dolphins, Jets, and Colts. Their first season in the NFL saw the team win only three games, lose ten, and tie one. In 1971, not only did the Bills finish in sole possession of the NFL's worst overall record at 1–13, but they also scored the fewest points (184) in the league that year while allowing the most (394); no NFL team has since done all three of those things in the same season in a non-strike year. They thus obtained the #1 draft pick for 1972, which was Notre Dame DE Walt Patulski. Despite good on-field performances, he struggled with injuries before being traded to the St. Louis Cardinals in 1976. Lou Saban, who had coached the Bills' AFL championship teams, was re-hired in 1972, in which the team finished 4–9–1.

Meanwhile, War Memorial Stadium was in severe need of replacement, being in poor condition, located in an increasingly worsening neighborhood, and too small to meet the NFL's post-1969 requirement that all stadiums seat at least 50,000. Construction began on a new stadium in the suburbs after Ralph Wilson threatened to move the team to another city; at one point after the 1970 season Wilson was “prepared to move the team” to Husky Stadium in Seattle (with plans to move into the Kingdome once completed) and was also fielding offers from Tampa and Memphis. Western New York leaders acquiesced to Wilson's demands and built a new open-air facility that featured a capacity of over 80,000 (at Wilson's request) and, unlike other stadiums, was built into the ground. Rich Stadium (later Ralph Wilson Stadium, now Highmark Stadium) opened in 1973 and continues to house the Bills to this day (both Seattle and Tampa would get NFL teams of their own in 1976, when the Seahawks and Tampa Bay Buccaneers, respectively, were enfranchised).

1973 was a season of change: Joe Ferguson became their new quarterback, the team moved into a new stadium, Simpson recorded a 2,000-yard season and was voted NFL MVP, and the Bills had their first winning record since 1966 with eight wins. The "Electric Company" of Simpson, Jim Braxton, Paul Seymour, and Joe DeLamielleure as recounted in the locally recorded hit "Turn on the Juice", lead a dramatic turnaround on the field. The "Electric Company" was the offensive line (OG Reggie McKenzie, OT Dave Foley, C Mike Montler, OG Joe DeLamielleure and OT Donnie Green) which provided the electricity for the "Juice". O.J. became the only player to rush for 2,000 yards prior to the institution of the 16-game season in 1978. The team made the NFL playoffs at 9–5 for the first time in history in 1974, but in their divisional playoff, they lost to the eventual Super Bowl champions, the Pittsburgh Steelers.

After an 8–6 1975 season, the Bills had internal troubles in 1976; Ferguson was injured and Gary Marangi proved ineffective in replacement. The team dropped to the bottom of the AFC East at 2–12, where they stayed for the rest of the 1970s. On a high note, the 1976 Thanksgiving Day game saw Simpson set the league record for rushing yards in a game, despite a 27–14 loss to the Detroit Lions. After the 1977 season, Simpson was traded to the San Francisco 49ers.

=== 1978–1983: The Chuck Knox-Kay Stephenson era ===
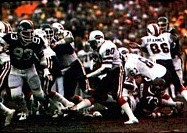
Bills' running back Joe Cribbs (middle) rushes the ball against the Jets in the 1981 AFC wild card game.

1980 marked the 3rd year the Bills were good. They beat the archrival Miami Dolphins for the first time in 11 years in their season opener, en route to an 11–5 season and their first AFC East title. However, they lost to the San Diego Chargers 20–14 in the divisional playoffs. In 1981, the Bills made the playoffs as a wild-card team with a 10–6 record. They defeated the New York Jets 31–27 in the wild card round of the playoffs, but lost in the divisional round to the eventual AFC champion Cincinnati Bengals, 28–21. The following year — the strike-shortened season of 1982 — the Bills slipped to a 4–5 final record and missed the playoffs. In the famous 1983 draft, the Bills selected quarterback Jim Kelly as their replacement to an aging Joe Ferguson, but Kelly decided to play in the upstart United States Football League instead.

=== 1984–1985: To the brink of collapse ===
Chuck Knox left his coaching position to take a job with the Seattle Seahawks, and running back Joe Cribbs also defected to the USFL, a loss incoming head coach Kay Stephenson unsuccessfully attempted to stop in court. In a 1984 article in The Buffalo News announcing Greg Bell's signing with the Bills, owner Ralph Wilson stated that the team was not yet in jeopardy, but that attendance would have to remain high, and television revenues would have to continue coming in for the team to survive. In 1984 and 1985, the Bills went 2–14. By this point, attendance at Rich Stadium had fallen to under 30,000 fans per game for most of the 1985 season, leaving the team's long-term future in doubt. Wilson was fielding offers, including one from Leonard Tose to trade the Bills for the Philadelphia Eagles. Steve Tasker, who joined in 1986, recalled that "being acquired by Buffalo was akin to being sentenced to prison in Siberia" because of the team's poor record at the time and Buffalo's bad weather.

== 1986–2000: Perennial contender ==
=== 1986–1989: Marv Levy, Jim Kelly, and Bill Polian arrive ===
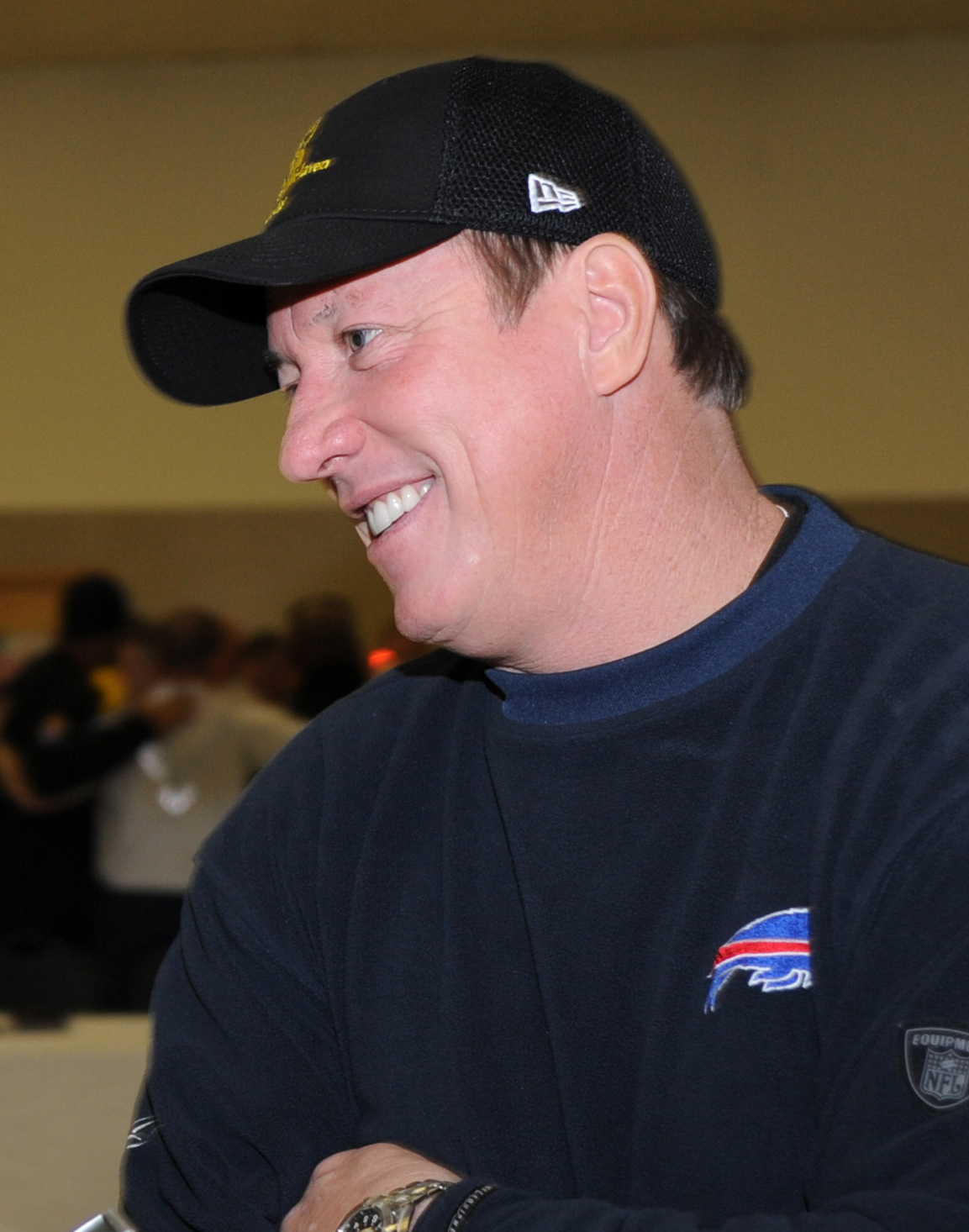
Jim Kelly quarterbacked the Bills for much of the 1990s.

Among the names that Buffalo picked up after the USFL's demise in 1986 were general manager Bill Polian, head coach Marv Levy (both from the Chicago Blitz), special teams coach Bruce DeHaven, starting quarterback Jim Kelly (of the Houston Gamblers), center Kent Hull (of the New Jersey Generals), and linebacker Ray Bentley (of the Oakland Invaders), all of whom joined the Bills for the 1986 season. Midway through the 1986 season, the Bills fired coach Hank Bullough and replaced him with Levy, who in addition to the Blitz had also previously coached the Kansas City Chiefs and Montreal Alouettes. Levy and Polian put together a receiving game featuring Andre Reed, a defense led by first-overall draft pick Bruce Smith, and a top-flight offensive line, led by Hull along with Jim Ritcher, Will Wolford and Howard "House" Ballard.

After the strike year of 1987, in 1988, the rookie season of running back Thurman Thomas, the Bills went 12–4 and finished atop the AFC East for the first of four consecutive seasons. After a 17–10 victory over the Houston Oilers in the divisional playoff, they lost the AFC championship 21–10 to the Cincinnati Bengals.

1989 was a relative disappointment, with a 9–7 record and a divisional playoff loss to the Cleveland Browns. The Bills had a chance to win the game as time was running out, but Ronnie Harmon dropped a Kelly pass in the corner of the end zone. During this season, the Bills were called the "Bickering Bills" by the fans and media due to significant infighting among the players and coaches throughout the season.

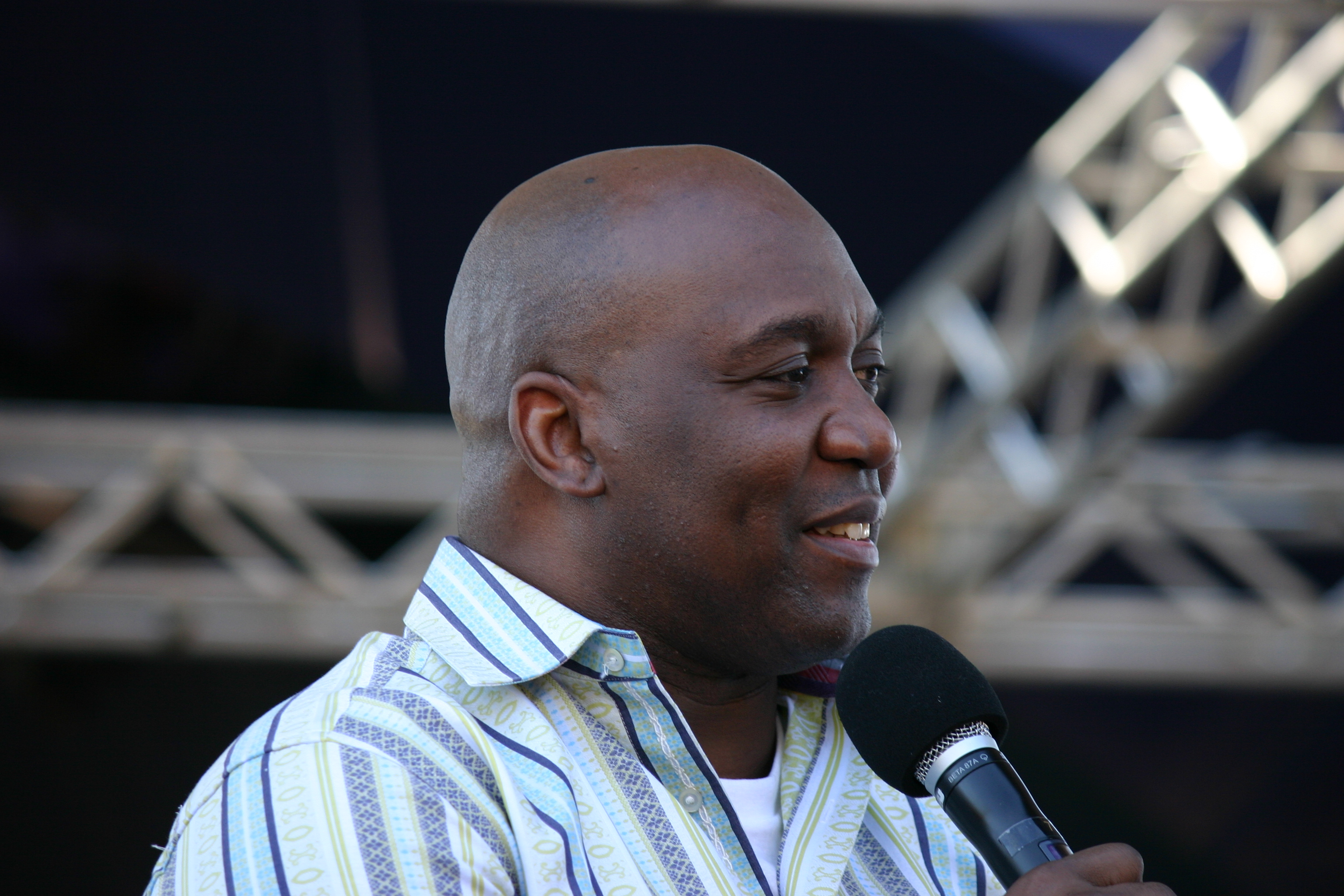
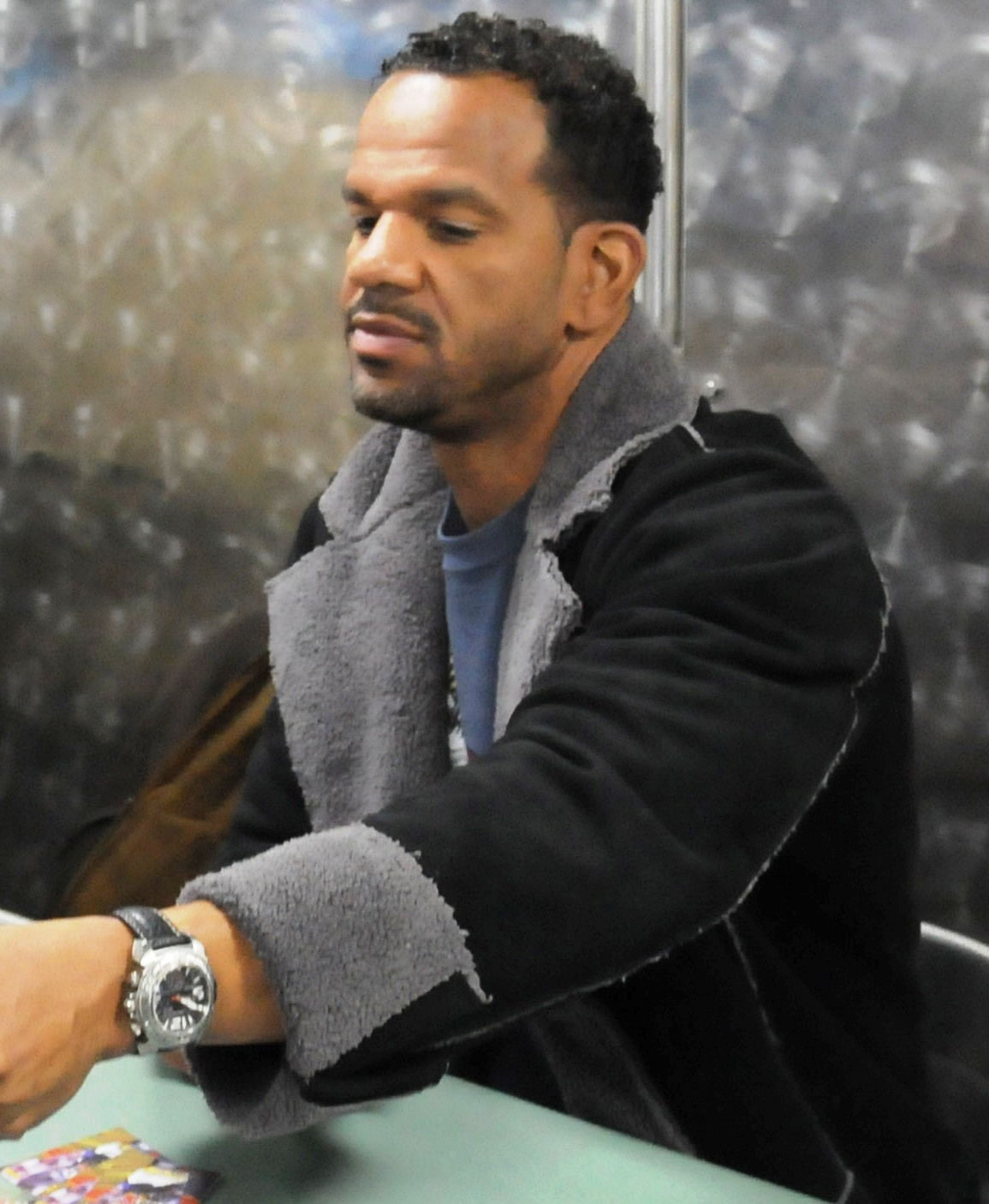
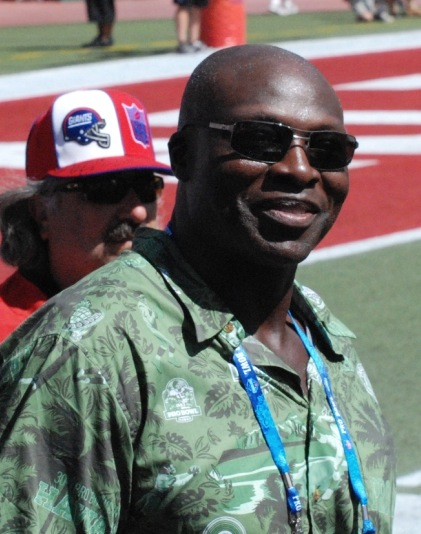
Thurman Thomas (top) and Andre Reed (middle) were among Kelly's top weapons during the Super Bowl years as part of the "K-Gun" offense, while Bruce Smith (bottom) was a ferocious pass-rusher on defense.

=== 1990–1993: The Super Bowl years ===
In 1990, the Bills switched to a no huddle, hurry-up offense (frequently with Kelly in the shotgun formation, the "K-gun", named for tight end Keith McKeller and not Jim Kelly), and it led the Bills' offense to one of the best in the league; their 428 points (26.75 points per game) scored was first in the league. The team finished 13–3, and behind their no-huddle attack, beat the Miami Dolphins 44–34 and blew out the Los Angeles Raiders 51–3 in the playoffs on their way to Super Bowl XXV. The Bills were favorites to beat the New York Giants (whom they had beaten on the road during the regular season), but the defensive plan laid out by Giants coach Bill Parcells and defensive coordinator Bill Belichick kept Buffalo in check (and without the ball) for much of the game. The game featured many lead changes, and with the score 20–19 in favor of New York with eight seconds left, Bills kicker Scott Norwood attempted a 47-yard field goal. His kick sailed wide right, less than a yard outside of the goalpost upright.

The Bills won their fourth consecutive AFC East title in 1991, finishing 13–3 again and with Thurman Thomas winning the NFL MVP award and Offensive Player of the Year. In the playoffs, they routed the Kansas City Chiefs 37–14 in the divisional round and beat the Denver Broncos in a defensive struggle, 10–7, in the AFC Championship. The Bills looked to avenge their heartbreaking Super Bowl loss a year earlier by playing the Washington Redskins in Super Bowl XXVI, but it was not to be. The Redskins opened up a 17–0 halftime lead and never looked back, handing the Bills a 37–24 loss. Early in that game, Thurman Thomas lost his helmet and had to sit out the first two plays, making the Bills the butt of jokes nationwide.

The Bills lost the 1992 AFC East title to the Miami Dolphins and Jim Kelly was injured in the final game of the regular season. Backup quarterback Frank Reich started their wild card playoff game against the Houston Oilers, and they were down 35–3 early in the third quarter. In what became known as The Comeback, the Bills rallied behind Reich, taking the lead late in the 4th quarter and winning the game in overtime 41–38. The 35–3 deficit remained the largest deficit (32 points) overcome to win a game in NFL history until it was broken in 2022. Buffalo then defeated the Pittsburgh Steelers 24–3 in the divisional playoff and upset the archrival Dolphins 29–10 in the AFC Championship to advance to their third straight Super Bowl. Super Bowl XXVII, played against the Dallas Cowboys, turned out to be a mismatch. Buffalo committed a Super Bowl-record 9 turnovers en route to a 52–17 loss, becoming the first team in NFL history to lose three consecutive Super Bowls. One of the sole bright spots for the Bills was Don Beebe's rundown and strip of Leon Lett after Lett had returned a fumble inside the Bills' 5-yard line and was on his way to scoring. Lett started celebrating too early and held the ball out long enough for Beebe, who had made up a considerable distance to get to Lett, to knock it out of his hand. The play resulted in a touchback, not a touchdown, thus stopping Dallas from breaking the record for most points scored by a team in a Super Bowl (55), which was set three years earlier and is still held today by the San Francisco 49ers.

The Bills won the AFC East championship in 1993 with a 12–4 record, and again won playoff games against the Los Angeles Raiders and Kansas City Chiefs, setting up a rematch with the Cowboys in Super Bowl XXVIII on January 30, 1994. The Bills became the only team ever to play in four straight Super Bowls, and in this game became the first team to face the same team in 2 straight Super Bowls, and looked ready to finally win one when they led at halftime. A Thurman Thomas fumble returned for a touchdown by James Washington tied the game, with Super Bowl MVP Emmitt Smith taking over the rest of the game for the Cowboys and the Bills were stunned again, 30–13.

=== 1994–1997: Decline ===
The four consecutive failures to win the title game, despite a 14–2 regular-season record against the NFC, inspired many jokes. Tasker recalled that when he made motivational speeches to groups of children, "invariably, some little guy raises his hand. He goes, 'Do you know what Bills stands for?' and I've heard it a hundred times. I go, 'No, what?' He goes 'Boy, I Love Losing Super Bowls'." A player denounced the team's poor reputation: "They still consider us losers. That is the most unfair statement that I've ever seen or heard or read in my life". Andrea Kremer recalled, however, that "I don't think there's any doubt that America, that the national fan base, turned their back on the Bills. They're just tired of it". Levy starred in a Snickers commercial satirizing the repeated defeats. The Bills' four straight losses in the Super Bowl entered common lexicon; the Atlanta Braves were described as the "Buffalo Bills of Baseball" (January 1996 issue of Beckett Baseball Card Monthly) having lost the World Series in 1991 and 1992, followed by an elimination in the NLCS in 1993, before winning in 1995 to shed the moniker, thereafter the Braves lost the World Series in 1996 and 1999.

The Bills would not get a chance to make it five straight in 1994. The team stumbled down the stretch and finished 7–9, fourth in the division and out of the playoffs. During this period Tasker established himself year in and year out as the league's top special teams performer.

In 1995, Buffalo signed free agent linebacker Bryce Paup to anchor the defense. The expansion Carolina Panthers ended up selecting several key Bills contributors (backup quarterback Frank Reich, wide receiver Don Beebe and tight end Pete Metzelaars) in the expansion draft, where they formed the core of that team's inaugural roster.

The Bills again made the playoffs with a 10–6 record, and defeated Miami in the wild card round. They would not get a chance to get back to the Super Bowl—the Pittsburgh Steelers, who went on to advance to the Super Bowl, beat Buffalo in the divisional playoffs 40–21.

In 1996, the Bills saw their commanding lead in the AFC East race disappear to a surging New England Patriots team; the Bills won against the Patriots in September, then in late October the Patriots won after three touchdowns were scored in the final 85 seconds. The Bills still made the playoffs as the Wild Card home team; they became the first victim of the cinderella Jacksonville Jaguars, the first visiting team ever to win a playoff game at Rich Stadium. Jim Kelly retired after the season after the Bills management told him they were moving in a new direction and wanted him to help develop a younger QB to take over, signaling an end to the most successful era in Bills history. Thurman Thomas gave way to new running back Antowain Smith. Kelly's loss was felt in 1997, when his replacement Todd Collins faltered and the Bills stumbled to 6–10. Coach Marv Levy retired after the season.

=== 1998–2000: Wade Phillips, Doug Flutie, and quarterback controversy ===
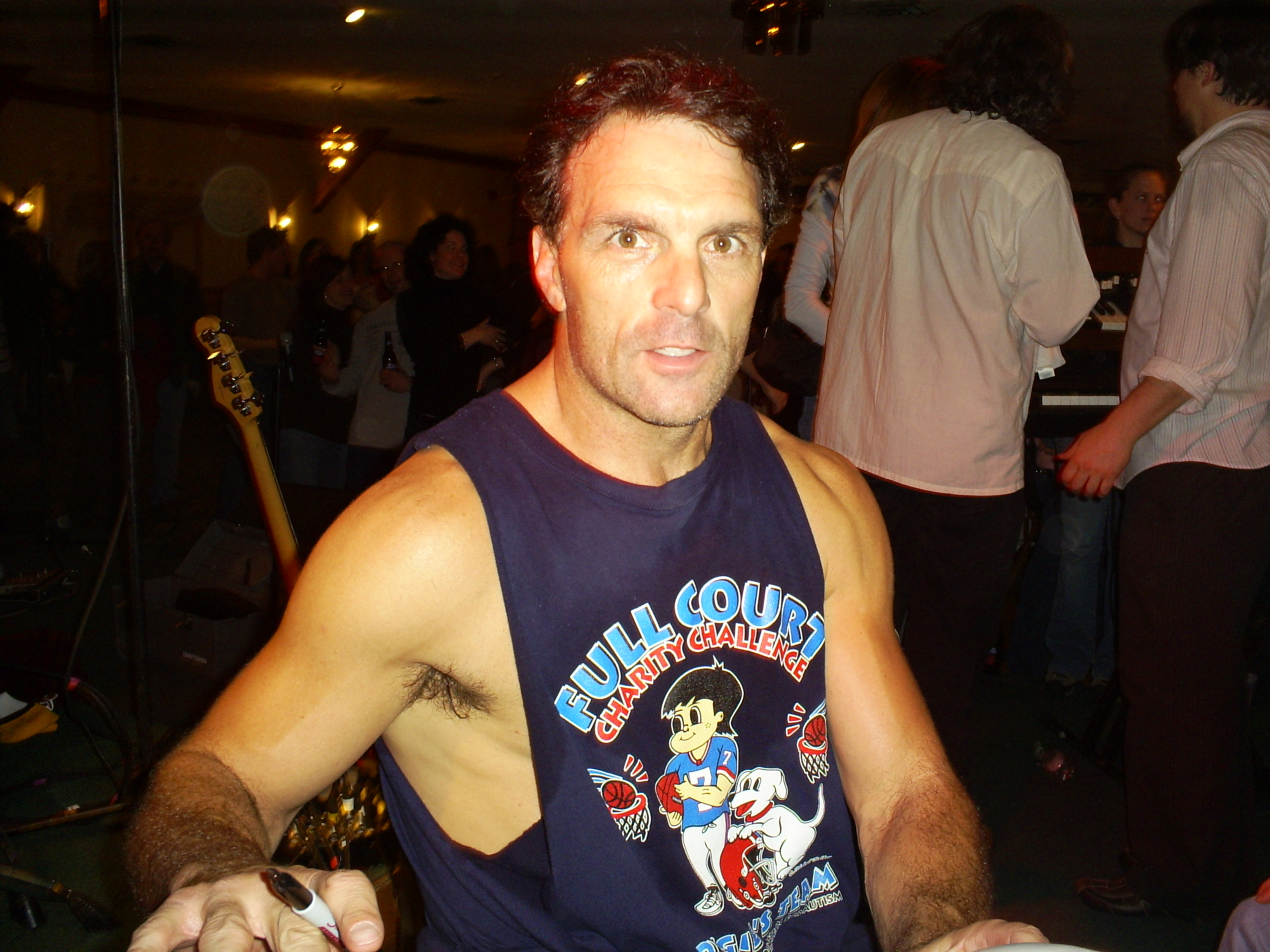
Doug Flutie quarterbacked the Bills for three years, including the last two playoff appearances before the team's lengthy absence from the postseason, amid controversy.

Under new coach Wade Phillips, the Bills signed two quarterbacks for the 1998 season, one that Buffalo traded a high first round pick for, and one that was signed as almost an afterthought. The former was for Jaguars backup Rob Johnson and the latter was former Heisman Trophy winner and Canadian Football League star Doug Flutie. Despite many Bills fans wanting Flutie to get the starting job after Flutie looked the better of the two QBs in camp and in preseason, Phillips named Johnson to the position. The Bills stumbled to begin the season 0–3, and after Johnson suffered a rib injury against the Indianapolis Colts, Flutie came in and led the Bills to a playoff spot and a 10–6 record. They faltered in their first playoff game against the Miami Dolphins.

Flutie's popularity continued into the 1999 season, with the Bills finishing 11–5, two games behind the Indianapolis Colts in the AFC East standings. Wade Phillips gave Rob Johnson the starting quarterback job in the first round playoff game against the Tennessee Titans even though Flutie had won 10 games and had gotten the Bills into the playoffs. The Bills scored a field goal with 16 seconds left to give them a 16–15 lead. But the Titans won the game on a controversial play that became known as the "Music City Miracle": During the ensuing kickoff, Frank Wycheck lateraled the ball to Kevin Dyson who then scored the winning touchdown. Although Wycheck's pass was close to an illegal forward lateral, replays were ruled inconclusive and the call on the field was upheld as a touchdown. The Titans went on to advance to the Super Bowl.

The Titans game would mark the last appearance by the Bills in the playoffs for the next 18 years. Following the season, the final ties to the Bills' Super Bowl years were severed when Thurman Thomas, Andre Reed and Bruce Smith were all cut. Antowain Smith, Eric Moulds, and Marcellus Wiley respectively had long since eclipsed them on the depth chart. In the 2000 season, the team would miss the playoffs following an 8–8 year. Both Flutie and Smith were dominant in their final game as Bills, in a 42–23 victory over the Seattle Seahawks. Thomas would be quickly replaced by rookie Travis Henry.

After the 2000 season, with the team still caught up in the Johnson vs. Flutie controversy, general manager John Butler departed for the San Diego Chargers—and took Flutie and Wiley with him, among many other Bills contributors. Doug Flutie left the Bills with a .677 winning percentage in 31 starts. Antowain Smith also left as a free agent for the New England Patriots, where he was the starting running back on their first two Super Bowl championship teams.

== 2001–2016: Playoff drought ==
=== 2001–2005: Tom Donahoe and Drew Bledsoe ===
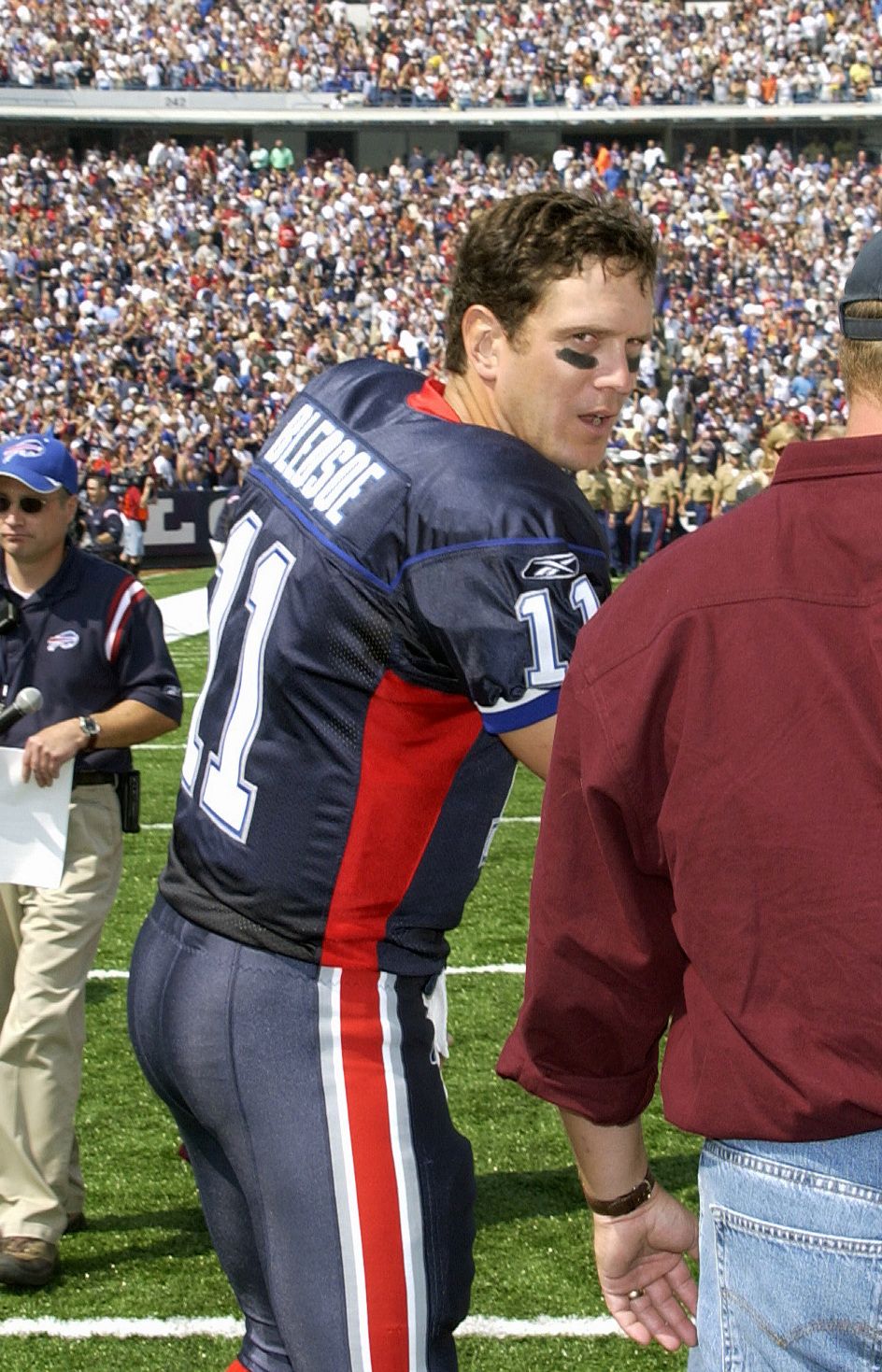
Long-time Patriots quarterback Drew Bledsoe broke several passing records in his first year with the Bills; his three-year tenure met with middling results overall.

In 2001, following the departure of John Butler, team owner Ralph Wilson announced his retirement as president of the organization and handed the reins of his franchise to Tom Donahoe, a former executive with the Pittsburgh Steelers. The move turned out to be disastrous. Donahoe (just a year after the team had released three eventual Hall of Famers in a salary cap move) proceeded to gut the franchise of most of its remaining recognizable talent and replaced it with young, inexperienced, unknown lower-end players, much of which joined Butler in San Diego that year, and installed Rob Johnson as the starting quarterback. The team went from playoff contenders to a 31–49 record during Donahoe's five-year tenure.

Titans defensive coordinator Gregg Williams took over as head coach for the 2001 season, which proved to be the worst in recent memory for the Bills. Rob Johnson went down in mid-season with an injury and Alex Van Pelt took over. Buffalo finished 3–13. The Bills even lost a much-hyped mid-season match up with "Bills West" (the Flutie-led Chargers).

Prior to the 2002 season, the Bills traded for quarterback Drew Bledsoe, deemed expendable by the Patriots after Tom Brady led them to a Super Bowl victory. Bledsoe revived the Bills for the 2002 season, leading them to an 8–8 record, setting 10 team passing records in the process. However, in a tough division with all other teams finishing 9–7, they were still in last place. Another Patriots castoff, safety Lawyer Milloy, who joined the Bills days before the 2003 season began, gave the team an immediate boost on defense (one of multiple defensive additions from 2002 to 2004, including Rams linebacker London Fletcher, Ravens defensive tackle Sam Adams, Bengals linebacker Takeo Spikes, and Eagles cornerback Troy Vincent). After beating eventual champions New England 31–0 in the first game, and crushing the Jaguars in their second game, play-by-play announcer Van Miller immediately announced his retirement as of the end of the season, expecting the team to have a shot at the title. However, the Bills stumbled through the rest of the season, finishing 6–10. In fact their season had ended the exact opposite of the beginning as they were trounced by New England 31–0. In one game, however, the Bills' fans gained a small measure of satisfaction when the defense sacked Rob Johnson multiple times in his relief effort for the Washington Redskins. Bledsoe's eventual successor, was one of several unsuccessful Bills quarterbacks in the 2000s. Gregg Williams was fired as head coach after the 2003 season and replaced with Mike Mularkey. The Bills also drafted another quarterback, J. P. Losman, to be used if Bledsoe continued to struggle in 2004. Unfortunately, Losman broke his leg in the pre-season and missed most of the regular season, seeing very limited action.

Bledsoe continued to struggle in 2004. The Bills started the 2004 season 0–4, with Bledsoe and his offense struggling in their run-first offense, averaging only 13 points per game. Additionally, each loss was heartbreakingly close. The team finally managed to turn things around with a victory at home against the also winless Miami Dolphins. This, along with the emergence of Willis McGahee (a first round-pick and a gamble by the Bills due to the knee injury that McGahee suffered in his last college game) taking over the starting running back role from the injured Travis Henry, and emergence of Lee Evans to give the Bills a second deep threat, sparked the Bills to go 9–2 in their next eleven games. This string of victories allowed the Bills to be in the hunt for a final AFC wildcard playoff spot. Though they would lose to the Pittsburgh Steelers in the final game of the season, costing them a playoff berth and devastating the fans, the late season surge gave the team a positive direction to approach 2005.

After the 2004 season, wanting to go in a younger direction and unhappy with Drew Bledsoe's overall performance, the Bills decided to hand the starting quarterback reins to J. P. Losman. This angered Bledsoe, who demanded his release, which the Bills granted. Bledsoe then signed with the Dallas Cowboys, reuniting him with his former New England Patriots coach Bill Parcells.

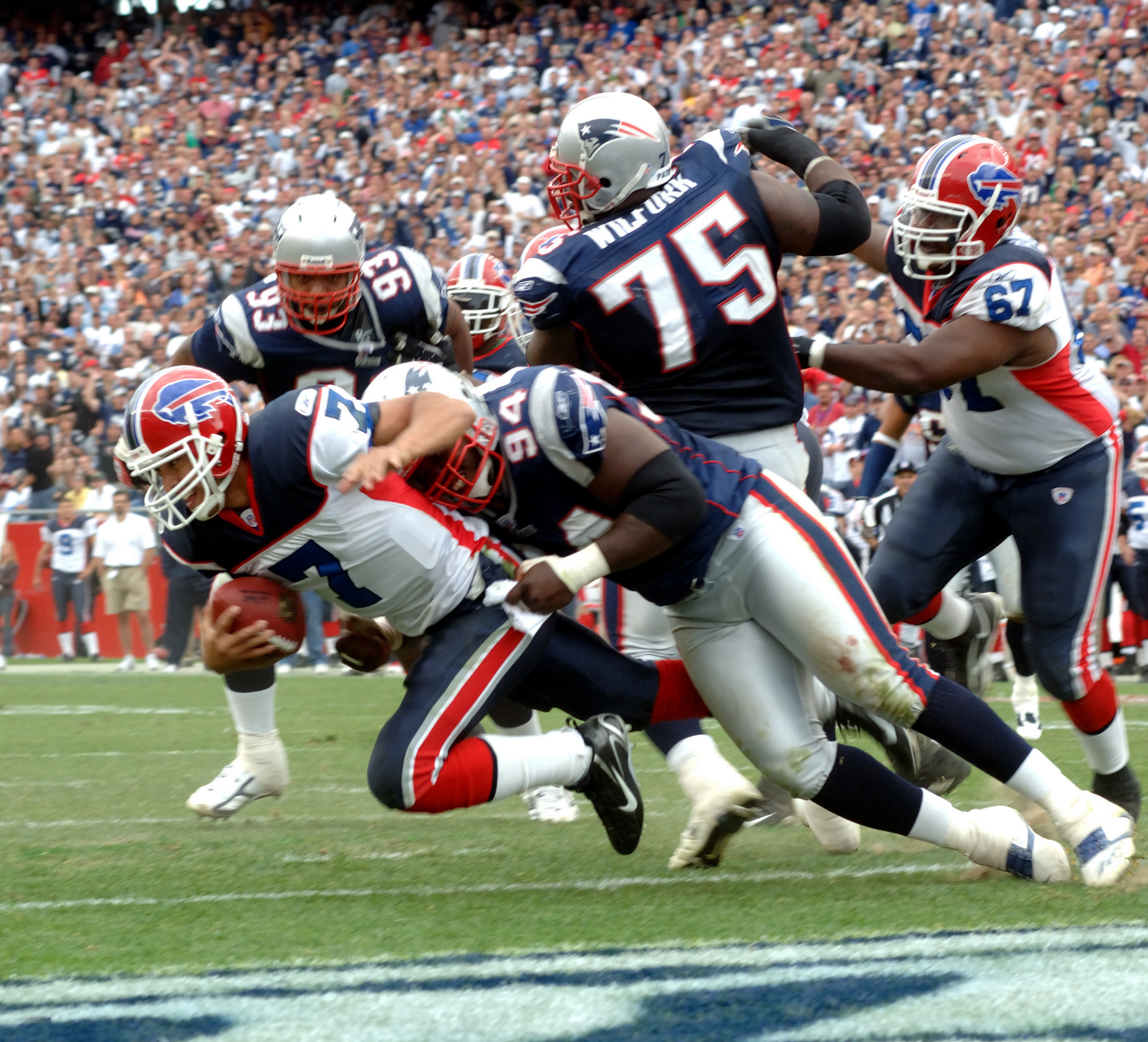
J. P. Losman (#7) incurring a safety against the New England Patriots, who dominated the Bills throughout the latter's 17-year playoff drought.

Losman's development did not proceed as quickly as the Bills had hoped it would. He began the 2005 season 1–3 as a starter, prompting Kelly Holcomb to replace him. Losman would not see action again until Holcomb was injured in Week 10 against the Kansas City Chiefs. He led the Bills to a win in that game, but would again be replaced by Holcomb after losing the next several games. Perhaps the low point of Losman's season was a 24–23 loss to the Miami Dolphins, a game in which Buffalo led 21–0 and 23–3, but gave up 21 unanswered points in the 4th quarter. Buffalo's 2005 campaign resulted in a 5–11 record and the firing of General Manager Tom Donahoe in January 2006. That same month, Mike Mularkey resigned as head coach, citing family reasons along with disagreement over the direction of the organization.

=== 2006–2009: Marv Levy's return, Russ Brandon, and Dick Jauron ===
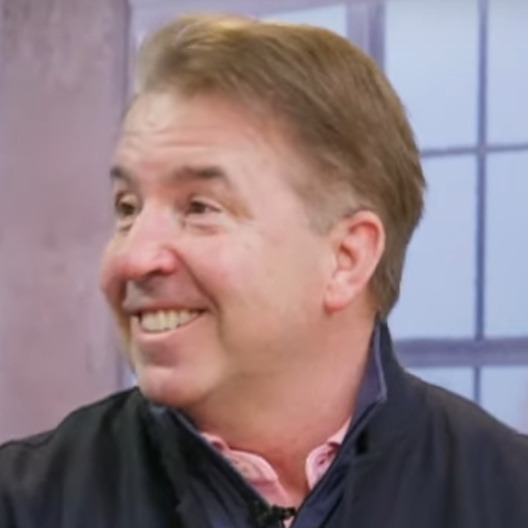
Russ Brandon became the team's director of non-football operations in 2006, later ascending to general manager, team president and second-in-command to the owner until 2018.

Marv Levy was named as Donahue's replacement in January 2006, with hopes that he would improve a franchise that failed to make the playoffs during Donahoe's tenure. Meanwhile, Russ Brandon was named to a high-level executive position as director of non-football operations alongside Levy. Dick Jauron was hired as head coach.

The 2006 and 2007 seasons both brought 7–9 records under Jauron's coaching, having been eliminated from playoff contention in December in both years. 2006 saw the additions of Donte Whitner, Ko Simpson, Ashton Youboty, Anthony Hargrove and Kyle Williams to the defensive corps while 2007 brought in Trent Edwards to quarterback the offense, rookie first-round draft pick Marshawn Lynch, second-round pick Paul Posluszny, offensive linemen Derrick Dockery and Langston Walker, and backup running back Fred Jackson. J. P. Losman played all 16 games in 2006 but was benched in early 2007 in favor of Edwards. At the end of the 2007 season, Levy retired once again, citing the fact that he had reached the end of his two-year contract. Brandon assumed responsibilities as de facto general manager for the next two years.

In a notable move, Toronto, Ontario would host one Bills game each year beginning in 2008, as league officials approved an October 2007 proposal by Bills owner Ralph Wilson to lease his team to Canadian media mogul Edward S. "Ted" Rogers Jr. to play an annual regular season game and a biennial preseason game in Toronto's Rogers Centre over the next five years, in exchange for a sum of C$78 million cash. The games, formally named the "Bills Toronto Series", began during the 2008 season. This led to speculation of the team eventually moving across the border to Toronto over the next few years.

The Bills started extremely well in the 2008 season, starting out with a 5–1 record before their bye week and showing promise in Trent Edwards as finally being a capable quarterback for the Bills. Notable additions to the roster had included free agent defensive tackle Marcus Stroud and draft picks cornerback Leodis McKelvin and wide receiver James Hardy. However, Edwards suffered a concussion from a brutal hit in a game against the Arizona Cardinals. The team then went 2–8 in their last games, earning them another 7–9 record.

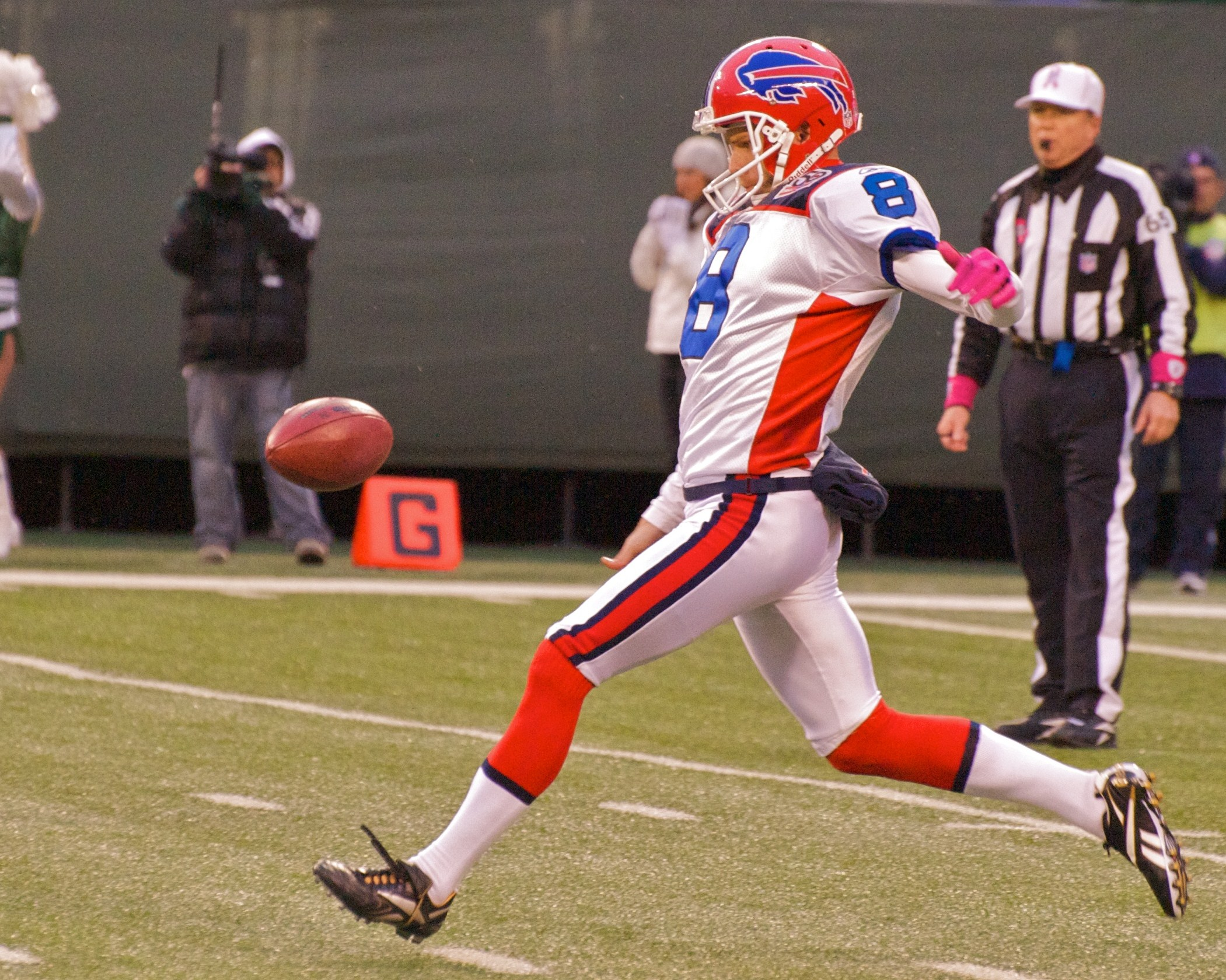
Punter Brian Moorman, who was named to the NFL's 2000s All-Decade team, was one of the team's few bright spots during this decade

In 2009 the Bills acquired veteran wide receiver Terrell Owens on a one-year deal. Owens was infamous for his elaborate touchdown celebrations and controversies with past teammates despite being a superstar player. In addition, former starting quarterback J. P. Losman, by this point relegated to third string behind Trent Edwards and Gibran Hamdan, was allowed to become a free agent. In the first round of the 2009 NFL draft, the Bills selected defensive end/linebacker Aaron Maybin with the 11th overall pick and center Eric Wood with the 28th overall pick; Wood would become a Pro Bowler and remain with the team for nine seasons while Maybin never recorded a sack with the Bills and was cut after two disappointing seasons.

As the 2009 season began, the team stumbled to a 3–6 start, after which the Bills fired head coach Dick Jauron midseason. The offensive line suffered from severe turnover and Terrell Owens proved to disappoint, with Owens' overall stats for 2009 being modest: 829 yards and five TDs. The season opener against New England was a loss, although Buffalo's morale was raised by the fact that it was only by a single point. Other notable games included a 16–13 OT victory over the Jets in Week 6, and the Week 10 game against Tennessee, where Titans owner Bud Adams made an obscene gesture at Bills fans and was fined $250,000. The Week 13 game against the Jets was an international series game held across the border in Toronto. In Week 15, the Bills hosted New England, but despite optimistic predictions, fell 17–10, marking the fifth season in a row where they lost both games against the Patriots. This eliminated Buffalo from playoff contention and marked their tenth consecutive season without a playoff appearance.

Quarterback Trent Edwards battled injury throughout the whole season with his play regressing throughout the weeks, splitting games with back-up Ryan Fitzpatrick, formerly of the Cincinnati Bengals. The Bills were hit with another hard blow when star running back Marshawn Lynch was given a three-game suspension by NFL Commissioner Roger Goodell for pleading guilty to misdemeanor weapons charges. Though back-up running back Fred Jackson did quite well in Lynch's absence, his performance then hindered on Lynch's return but he still had a 1,000-yard rushing season. However, the performance of free safety Jarius Byrd showed extreme promise as Byrd led the NFL with 9 interceptions and was selected to the Pro Bowl.

=== 2010–2012: Buddy Nix, Chan Gailey, and Ryan Fitzpatrick ===
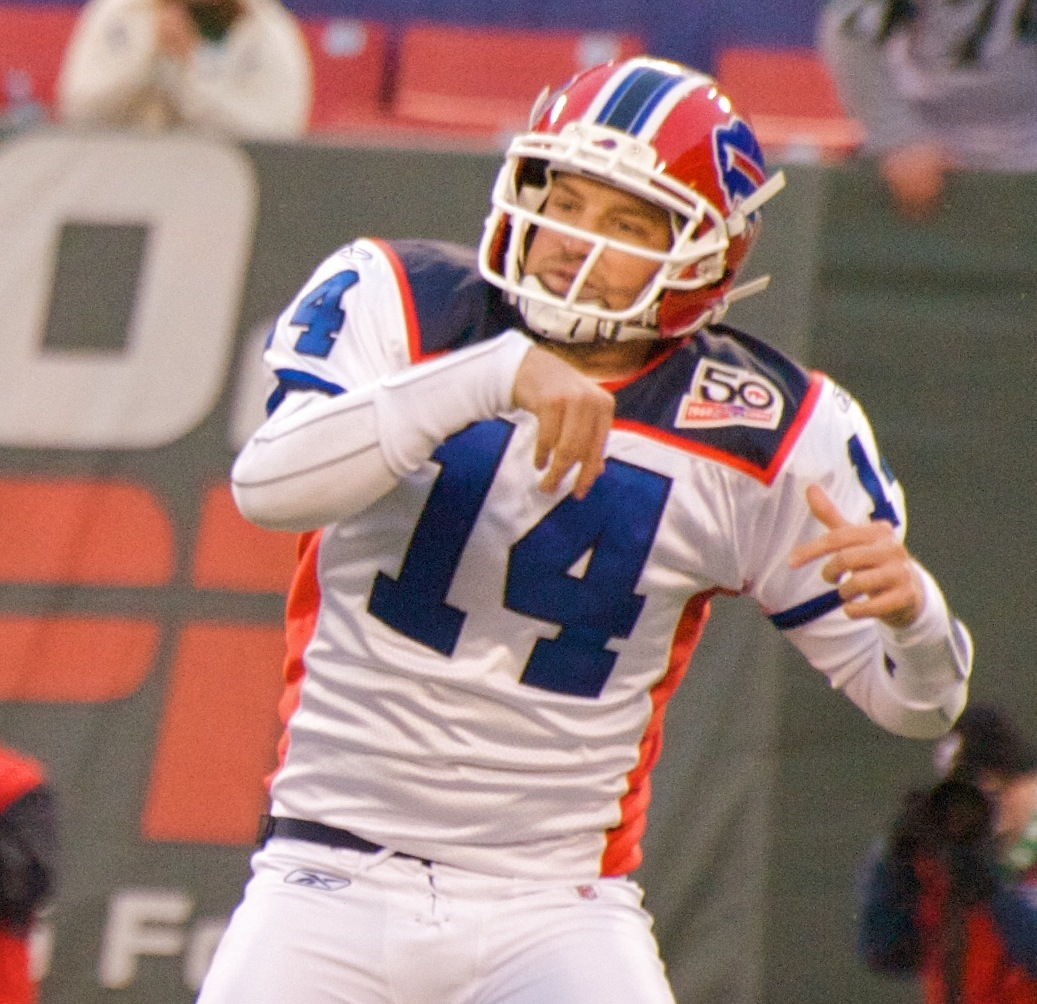
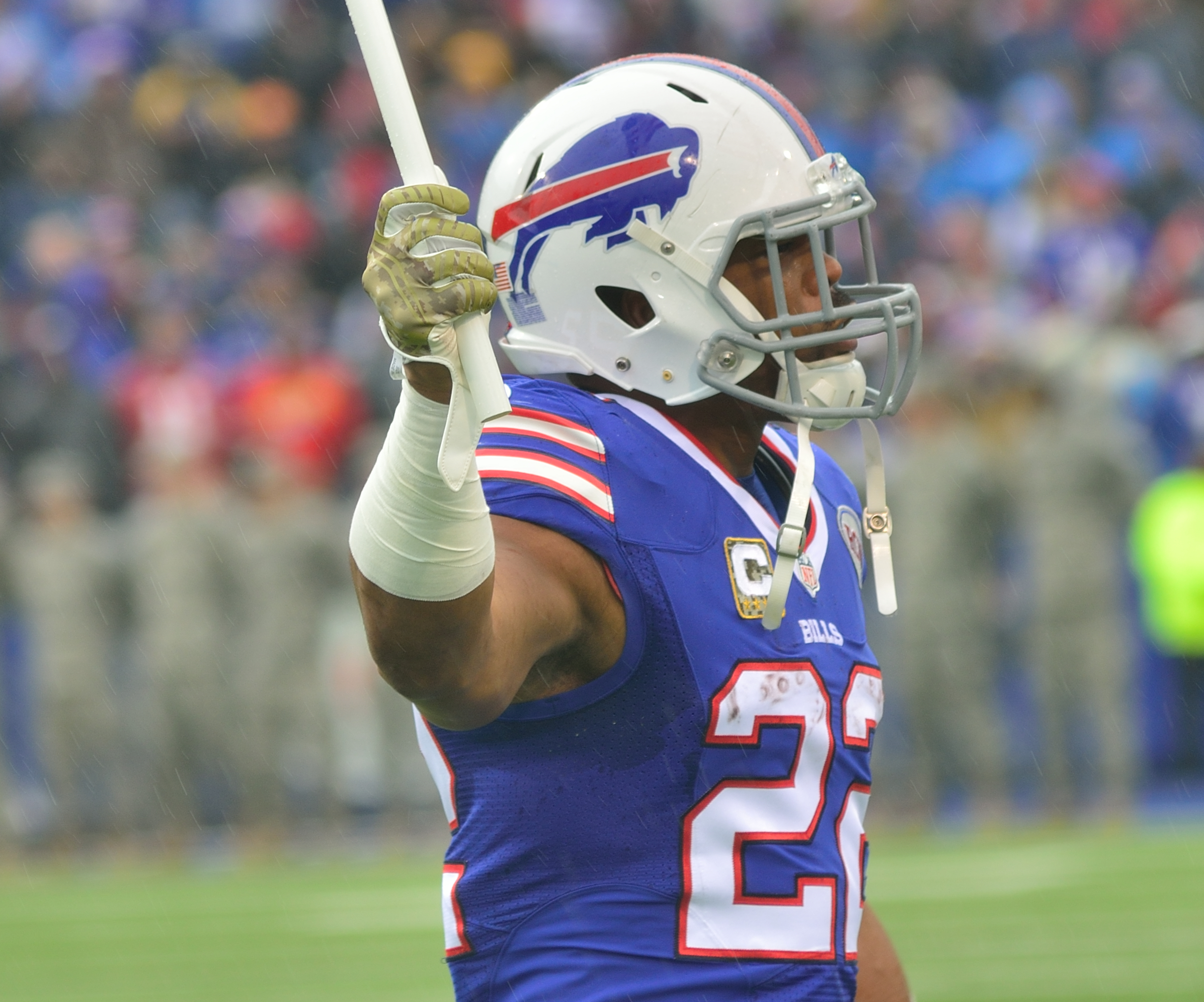
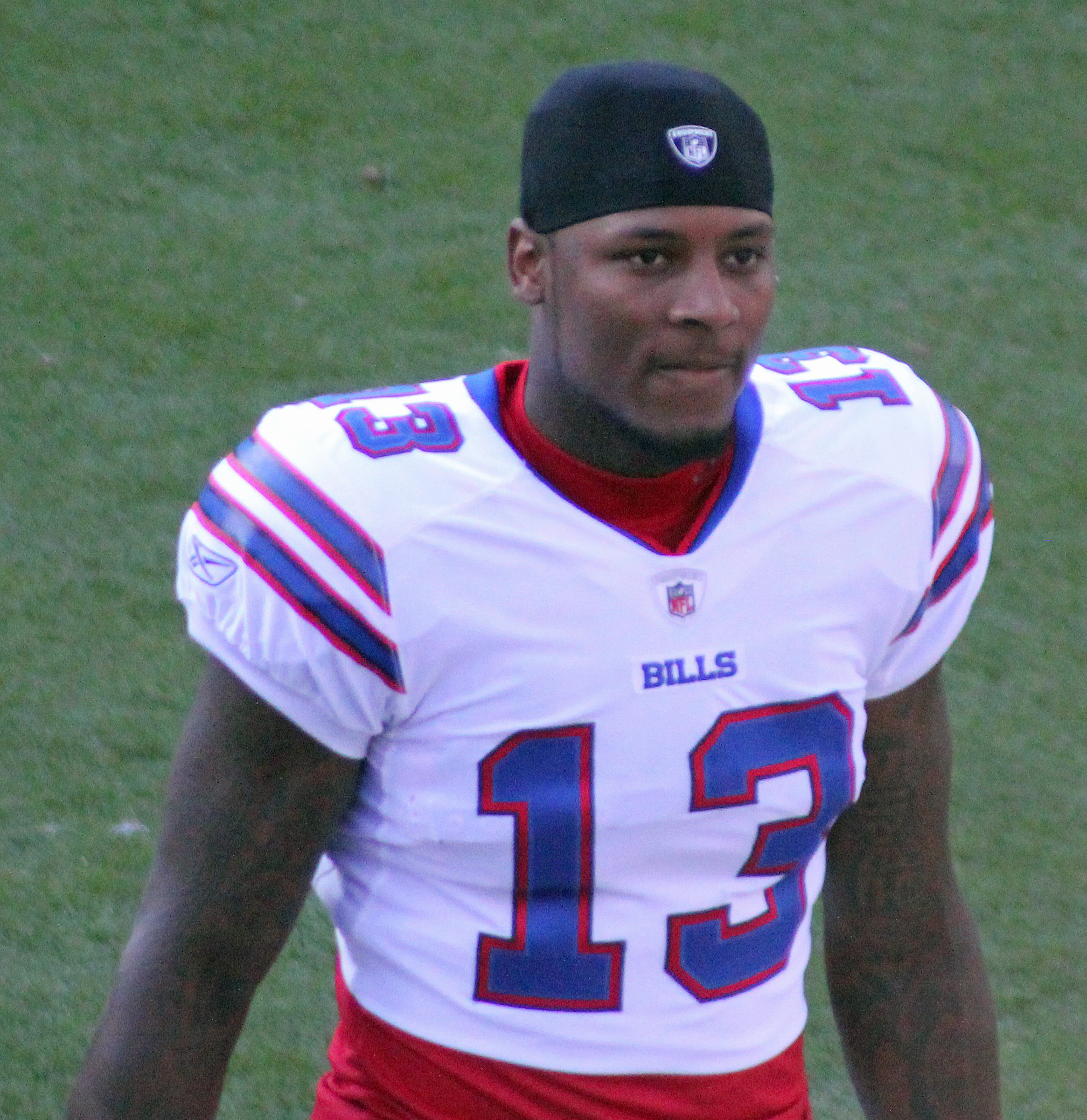
The "big three" of Chan Gailey's surprisingly efficient offense consisted of former late-round draft picks or undrafted players. From top to bottom: QB Ryan Fitzpatrick, RB Fred Jackson and WR Stevie Johnson

Buddy Nix, a former assistant general manager of the San Diego Chargers, was named general manager in the final week of the 2009 season. One of his first personnel moves was to cut ties with Owens (ironically, a man he had recruited during his time in college football). With the expiration of Terrell Owens' contract in March 2010, the Bills chose not to re-sign him. Meanwhile, on January 20 the team named Chan Gailey as head coach. Gailey was previously the offensive coordinator of Kansas City and head coach of Georgia Tech and the Dallas Cowboys, going 8–0 in the division in 1998, and leading the team to the postseason in both 1998 and 1999.

As the 2010 season began, the Bills lost to Miami at home. After going 0–4, the Bills released Trent Edwards and named Ryan Fitzpatrick starting quarterback. Marshawn Lynch was also traded away after some off-the-field controversies, the emergence of Fred Jackson, and the drafting of C. J. Spiller from Clemson. Despite some close games, the Bills ended up at an 0–8 record before beating Detroit at home in Week 10. Then came a 49–31 win in Cincinnati and an OT loss to Pittsburgh. The team finished 2010 with a 4–12 record. As a result of the Bills' poor play in 2010, the team earned the third overall selection in the 2011 NFL draft, using it to select defensive tackle Marcell Dareus in an effort to improve the team's long-struggling run defense. The Bills fired Tom Modrak, one of the last connections to the Donahoe era, shortly after the 2011 draft.

Buffalo had an excellent start to 2011, routing Kansas City 41–7. The following week, they hosted Oakland and erased a 21–3 deficit, winning 38–35. In week 3, the Bills hosted the Patriots; they erased a 21–0 Patriots lead and led 31–24 in the fourth; a late Tom Brady touchdown tied the game, but the Bills whipped into range of a last second field goal. The 34–31 win ended a 15-game franchise losing streak spanning 8 years to the Patriots. Despite starting the 2011 season with a 5–2 record, leading the AFC East for several weeks, a wave of injuries to several key starters, including Jackson and Fitzpatrick, led to the Bills compiling a 7-game losing streak, pushing the team out of playoff contention for the twelfth straight year. The losing streak was finally broken with a defeat of the Tim Tebow-led Denver Broncos on Christmas Eve, in a game that had unusually poor attendance. With the Detroit Lions making the playoffs for the first time since 1999 that same season, the Bills held the longest postseason drought in the NFL.

On March 15, 2012, defensive end and former first-overall pick Mario Williams, formerly of the Houston Texans, signed a six-year contract with the Bills worth up to $100 million ($49.5 million guaranteed), which made it the most lucrative contract for a defensive player in NFL history at the time. Unfortunately, it was not enough to prevent another disappointing season in 2012 in which the Bills finished 6–10 again. Following the season, the Bills relieved Chan Gailey and his entire coaching staff of their duties. While Gailey reinvigorated the Bills offense, his teams were undone by poor defensive play, in contrast to bad offense but decent defense under the Jauron years.

=== 2013–2014: The Doug Marrone years and the death of Ralph Wilson ===
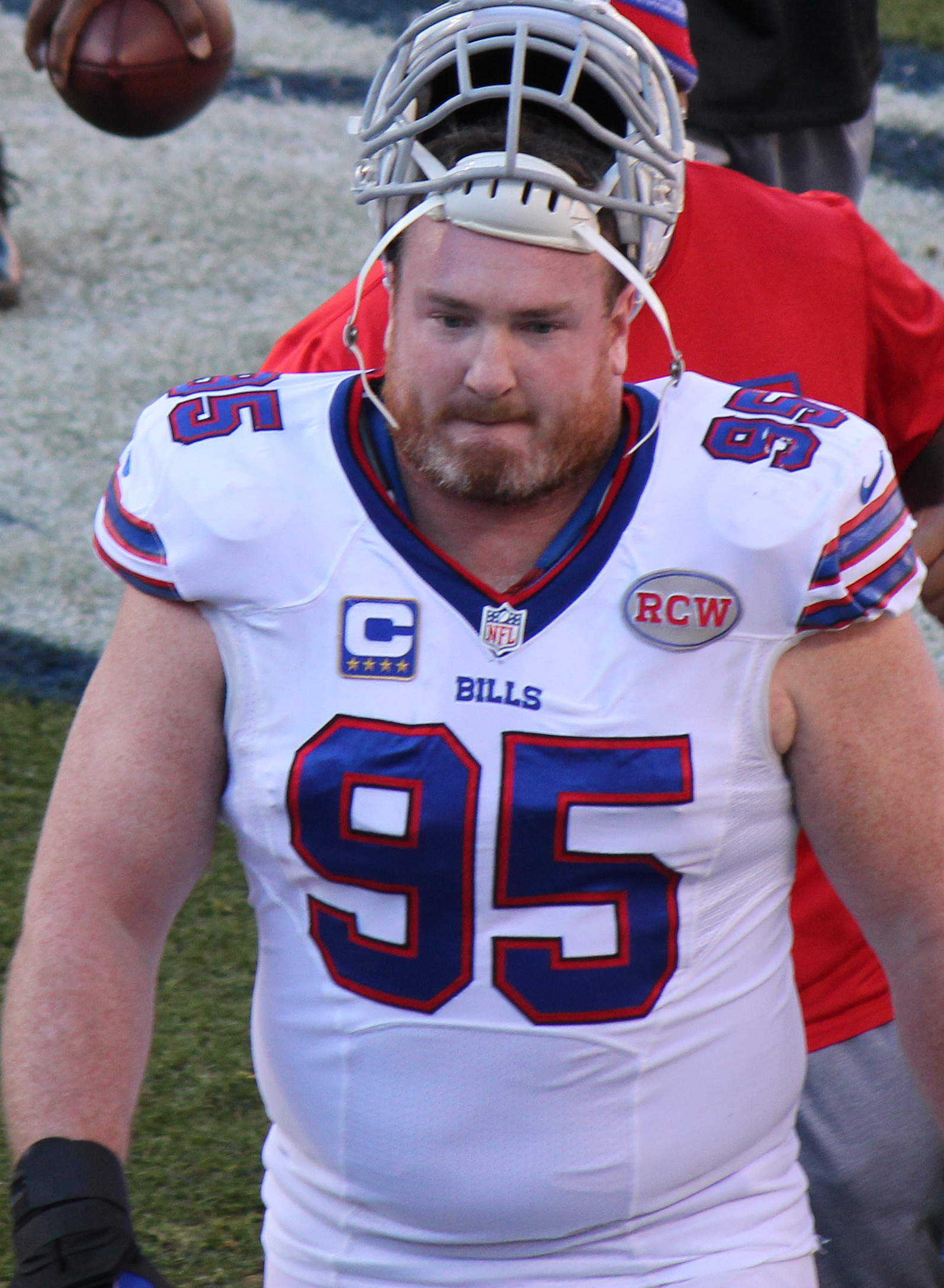
Defensive tackle Kyle Williams anchored the Bills defense for much of the 2010s

On January 1, 2013, it was announced that Ralph Wilson had "passed the torch" to Russ Brandon, and that he would have complete control of football operations. He then served as CEO and President of the team. Later that month, the team hired Doug Marrone as their new head coach. Nix would announce his resignation after the draft, and Doug Whaley moved into the general manager position.

Offseason player moves included Ryan Fitzpatrick being released and replaced by Kevin Kolb in free agency. The Bills also swung a trade with the Indianapolis Colts, sending linebacker Kelvin Sheppard in exchange for edge rusher Jerry Hughes. Hughes, along with Mario Williams, Kyle Williams, and Marcell Dareus, would form the "Cold Front" defensive line that helped Buffalo rank in the top two teams for quarterback sacks over the next two years, attaining 54 or more in both seasons. In the 2013 NFL draft the Bills traded back from their 8th pick to the 16th pick and selected quarterback E. J. Manuel out of Florida State. Receivers Robert Woods and Marquise Goodwin, the latter of whom was also an Olympic sprinter, and linebacker Kiko Alonso were among the other notable players chosen in the 2013 draft.

As the 2013 season approached, a knee injury to Manuel and a season-ending concussion to Kolb almost forced the team to start undrafted rookie Jeff Tuel; Manuel nonetheless recovered in time to start week 1 only to injure his other knee a few weeks later, which resulted in the signing of Thad Lewis (who himself had started a game as an undrafted rookie the previous year with the Cleveland Browns). The Bills finished 6–10 yet again and missed the playoffs for the 14th consecutive season.

Owner Ralph Wilson died March 25, 2014, at the age of 95. Wilson's assets, including the team, were placed into a trust governed by four members: Wilson's widow, Mary Wilson; his niece, Mary Owen; Jeff Littman, the Bills' chief financial officer; and Eugene Driker, an attorney. The trust sold the team to Buffalo Sabres owner Terrence Pegula, along with his wife Kim, reportedly for $1.4 billion in cash, which the Wilson trust intends to use as an endowment for charitable causes in Western New York (and Wilson's hometown of Detroit); Pegula outbid two other parties, a Toronto-based consortium led by Jon Bon Jovi and a stalking horse bid from Donald Trump (the latter's failure was a major factor in Trump's decision to run for president the next year), to secure the team. The deal closed October 10, 2014. Having committed to keeping the Bills in Buffalo, the Pegulas negotiated with Rogers Communications to cancel the Bills Toronto Series as one of their first actions as the new owners.

The Bills finished the 2014 season with a 9–7 record, which broke a league-leading streak of nine consecutive losing seasons. However, they were eliminated from playoff contention after a loss to the Oakland Raiders in the second to last week of the season, which extended their league-leading playoff drought to fifteen seasons. The starting quarterback for most of the 2014 season was Kyle Orton, a last-minute signing who was named starter a month into the regular season. Orton announced his retirement the Monday following the conclusion of the season.

=== 2015–2016: Rex Ryan and new ownership under the Pegulas ===
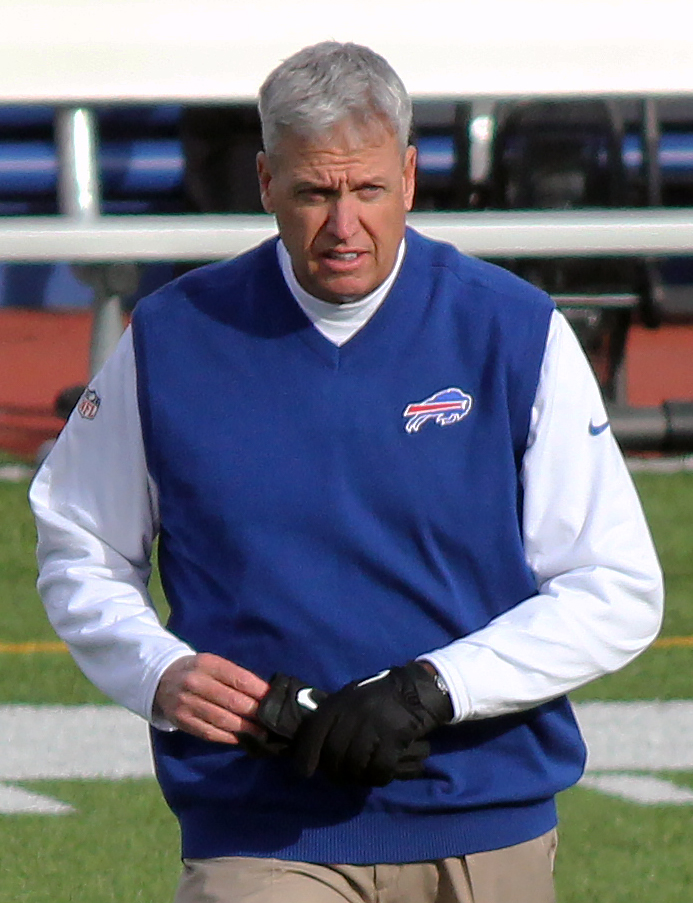
Rex Ryan with the Bills in 2015.

The 2015 season was the first full season for the Bills under the Pegula Family's ownership. On December 31, 2014, Doug Marrone chose to opt out of his contract with the Bills. He asked for a contract extension, but his request was denied by Mr. Pegula. On January 11, 2015, it was reported that Rex Ryan, who had recently been fired from his head coaching job with the New York Jets, would become the next head coach. Ryan was officially named the new head coach the next day, January 12, 2015. The day after that, January 13, 2015, it was announced that defensive coordinator Jim Schwartz would not be returning for the 2015 season. The team dramatically overhauled its offense in the offseason, bringing in a number of new starters: quarterback Tyrod Taylor, running back LeSean McCoy, fullback Jerome Felton, wide receiver Percy Harvin and tight end Charles Clay.

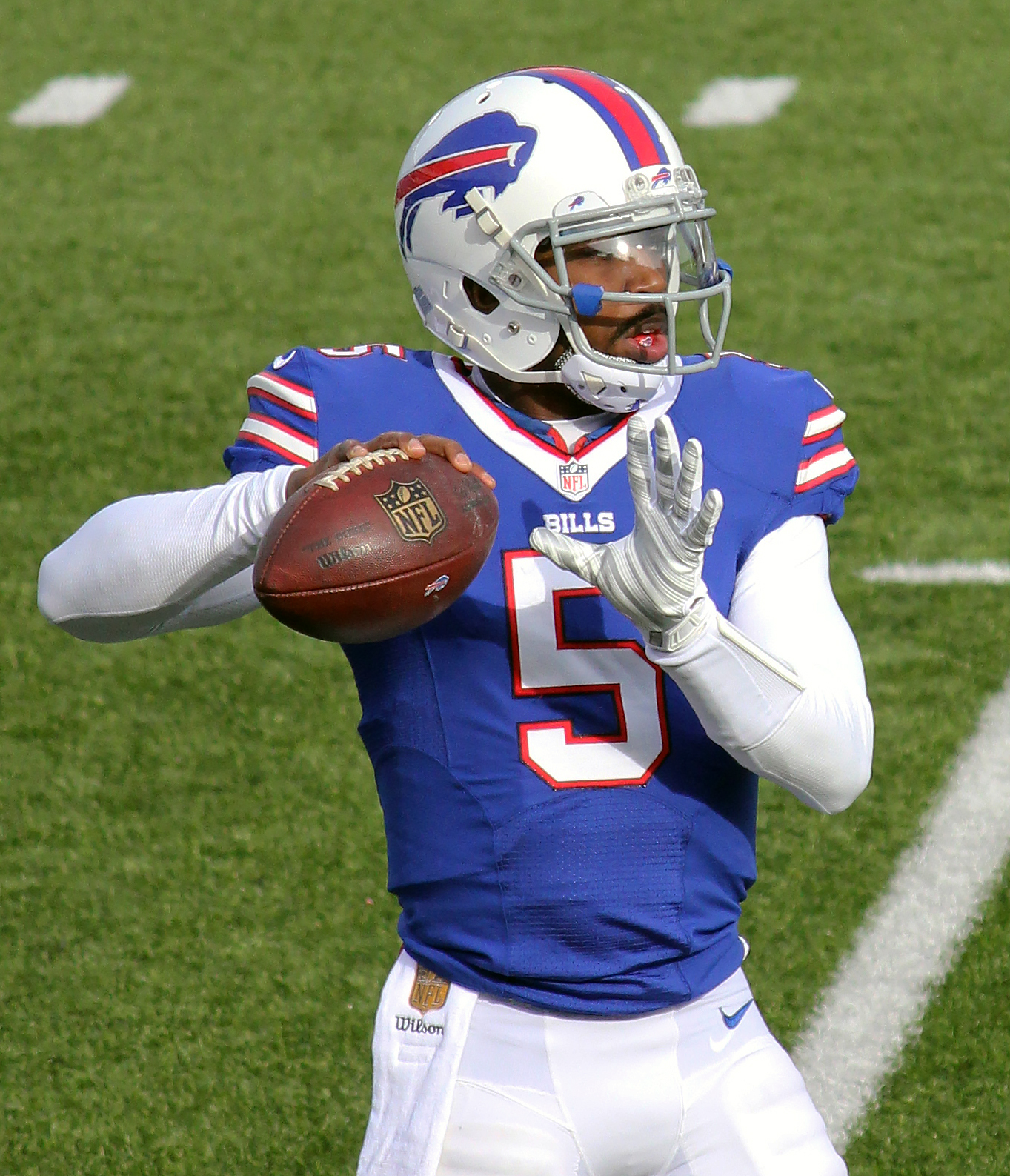
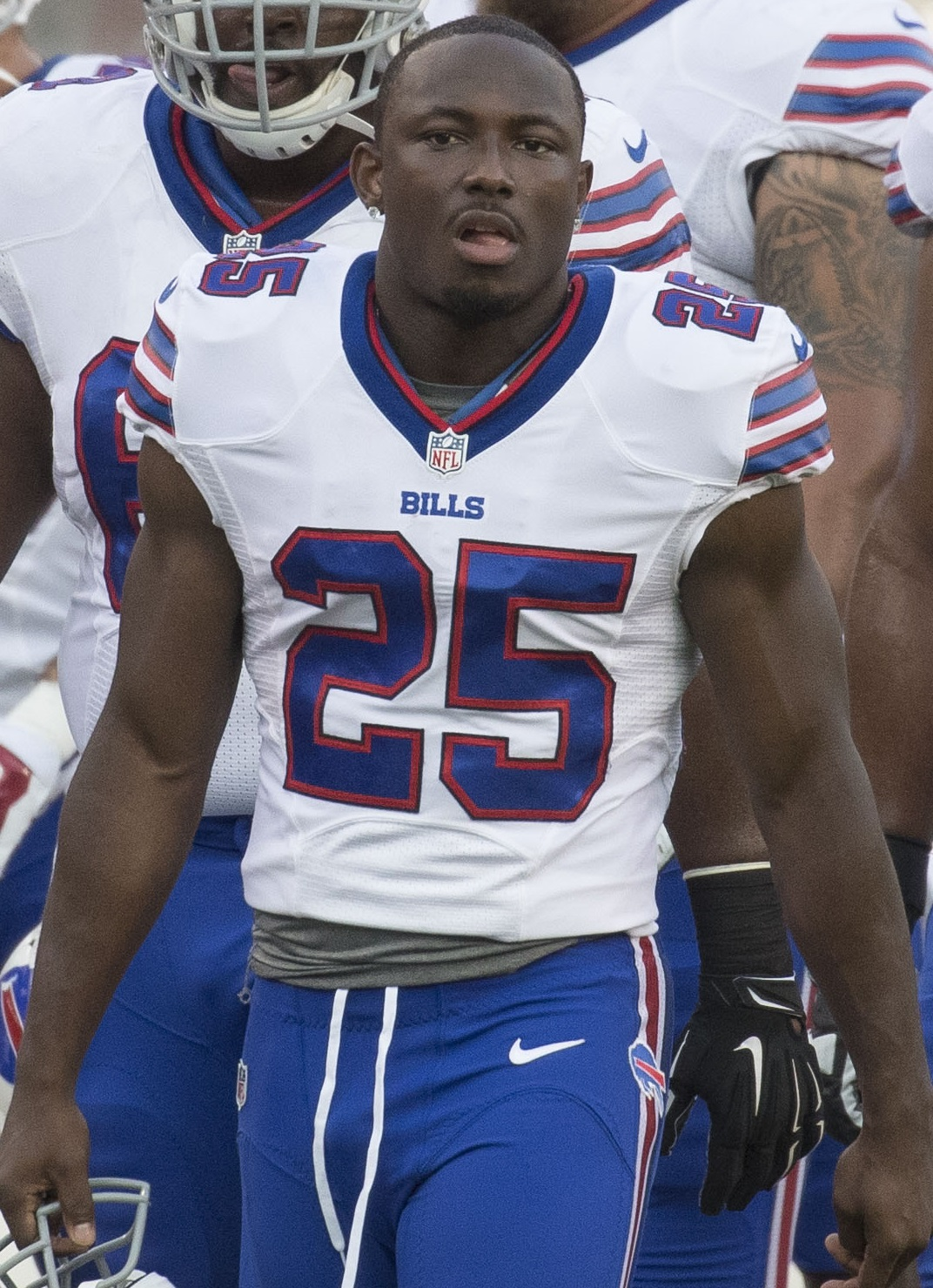
QB Tyrod Taylor (top) and RB LeSean McCoy (bottom) led an effective run-first offense under Ryan and in Sean McDermott's first year as head coach, both playing a big role in breaking the Bills' playoff drought in 2017

The Bills set a franchise record for season ticket sales for the 2015 season with more than 60,000 season tickets sold. The Rex Ryan hiring has been linked to the high increase in sales. The Bills opened the 2015 season with a 24–17 win over the Indianapolis Colts, but faltered (despite an unsuccessful late-game comeback) against traditional nemesis New England. Through the first quarter of the season the Bills led the NFL in penalties heading into their Week 5 game against the Tennessee Titans. After being flagged 17 times in Week 4 against the New York Giants, the Bills were penalized only seven times in their 14–13 victory over the Titans. In the end, the Bills finished a middling 8–8, missing the playoffs for the 16th consecutive season, the longest active streak in major professional sport (after the 2015 Toronto Blue Jays broke their then-22-year streak).

In 2016 Kathryn Smith became the first woman to be a full-time coach in the NFL, when she was hired by the Bills as a special teams quality control coach.

The start of the 2016 season was marred by long-term injuries to both of the team's top draft picks, first-rounder Shaq Lawson and second-rounder Reggie Ragland (who will miss his entire rookie season). On December 27, 2016, Rex Ryan was fired after compiling 15–16 record in 2 seasons along with his brother Rob which made the Bills the third team in the NFL to fire a coach in-season (along with the Los Angeles Rams and Jacksonville Jaguars who both fired Jeff Fisher and Gus Bradley), Anthony Lynn was promoted to interim coach. After winning four straight games from weeks 3–6, they only won three more games to finish 7–9. Though Ryan was hired as a defensive-minded coach, the Bills defense ironically declined during his tenure, as compared to the Doug Marrone era, though the offense improved significantly.

== 2017–2025: Sean McDermott and Josh Allen ==
=== 2017 ===
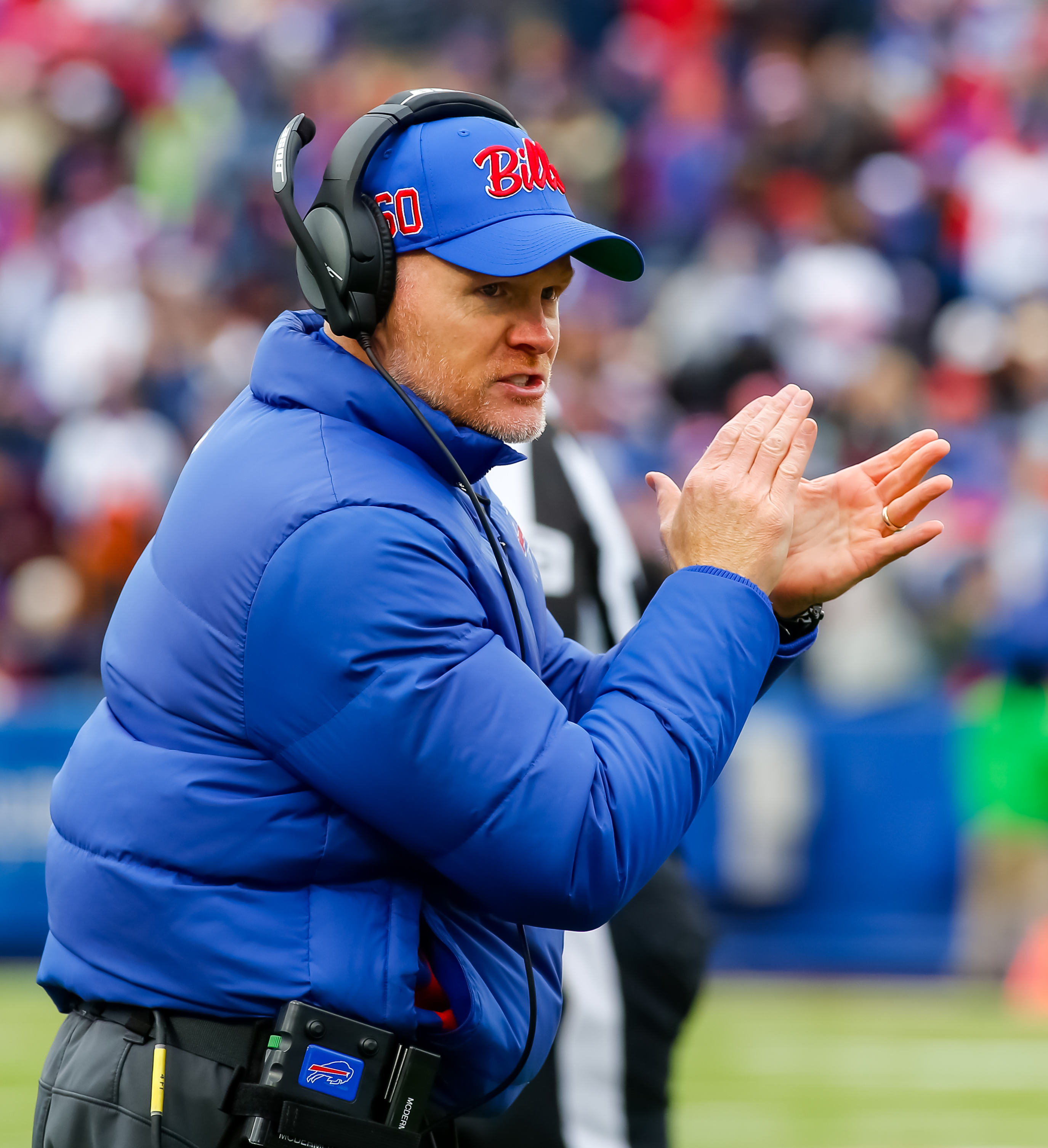
Head coach Sean McDermott led the Bills to the playoffs in eight of his nine years with the team

On January 11, 2017, Sean McDermott was hired as the head coach of the Buffalo Bills. McDermott had previously spent the past six seasons as the defensive coordinator of the Carolina Panthers. Along with McDermott, Brandon Beane, the Panthers' assistant general manager, replaced Doug Whaley as the Bills' general manager. Many of the players that Whaley had added or extended, including receiver Sammy Watkins, cornerback Ronald Darby, and defensive tackle Marcell Dareus, were traded away before or during the season. During the 2017 offseason, McDermott popularized the term "Trust the Process" when questioned if he was rebuilding the team. The tandem of McDermott and Beane have since been referred to by fans as "McBeane".

Despite low expectations for McDermott's first season, the Bills played surprisingly well aside from a 3-game midseason slump. On December 31, 2017, the Bills secured a playoff berth for the first time in 17 seasons with a win over the Miami Dolphins (concurrently with a Baltimore Ravens loss to the Cincinnati Bengals). Their season ended on January 7, 2018, when the Bills lost to the Jacksonville Jaguars in the AFC Wild Card game by a score of 10–3.

=== 2018 ===
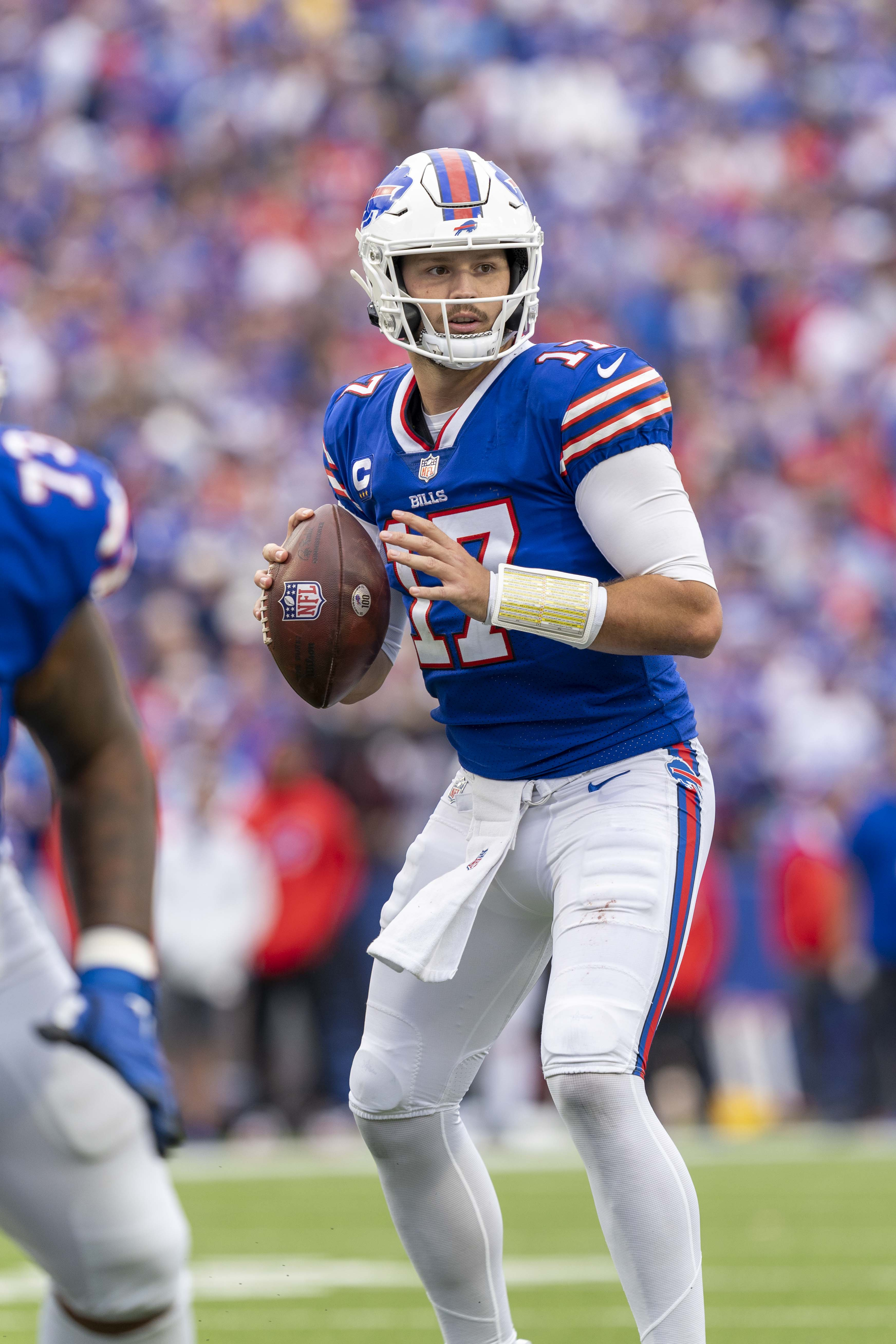
Quarterback Josh Allen emerged as the starter in 2018 after being drafted 7th overall that year. He has since helmed a resurgent Bills passing attack and broken several records.

During the offseason, the Bills overhauled their roster yet again, trading away Tyrod Taylor and tackle Cordy Glenn. In addition, longtime center Eric Wood announced his retirement due to health issues, and guard Richie Incognito began suffering mental breakdowns and was released from his contract at his request. They then brought in former Bengals backup A. J. McCarron and drafted Josh Allen to compete for the starting quarterback position. On May 1, just days after the 2018 NFL draft, Russ Brandon abruptly resigned from the organization. He was replaced as president by Kim Pegula.

Nathan Peterman, who performed the best of the three quarterbacks during the 2018 preseason, was named the opening day starter. Midway through the first regular season game, in which he failed to obtain a first down until the third quarter and threw two interceptions (the team was down 40–0 by the end of Peterman's day), he was benched in favor of Allen; that game ended up a 47–3 loss to the Baltimore Ravens. Though Allen was named starter from week 2 onward, Peterman would play several more games for the Bills after injuries to Allen but was released later in the season after several more poor performances, with Matt Barkley signed to replace him as the backup. The Bills would finish the 2018 season 6–10, fielding an anemic offense early in the year and poor special teams play throughout, but also the league's second-ranked defense.

Notable games included a 27–6 win over the heavily favored Minnesota Vikings, a rematch of the previous year's Wild Card game against the Jacksonville Jaguars in which the Bills avenged their playoff loss, and a battle of rookie quarterbacks between Allen and Sam Darnold of the rival New York Jets. 2018 was also notable for being the final season for longtime defensive tackle Kyle Williams, who retired at the end of the season, and was widely considered the "heart and soul" of the team. Williams caught a pass from Allen in his final game with the Bills, a 42–17 victory over the Dolphins.

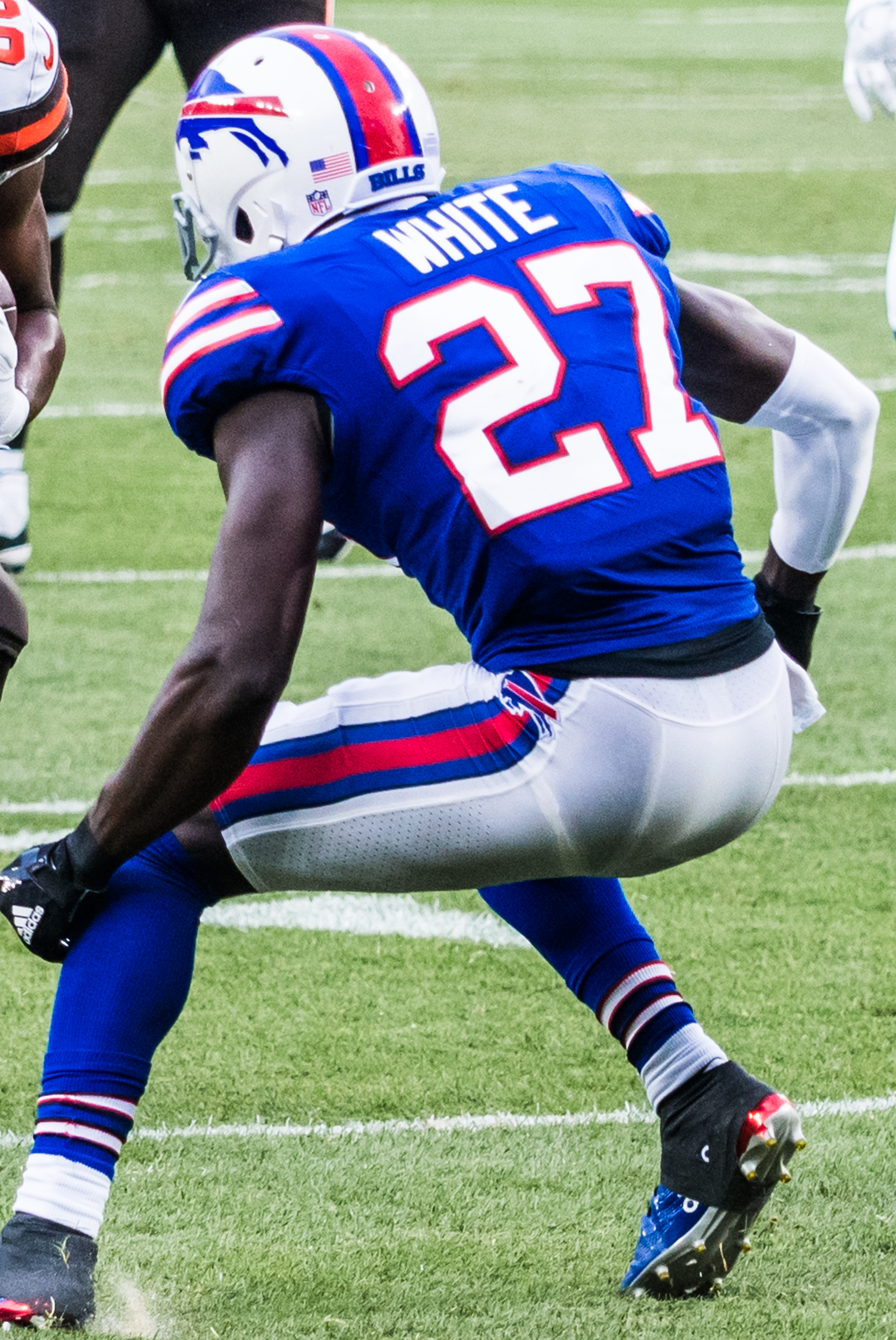
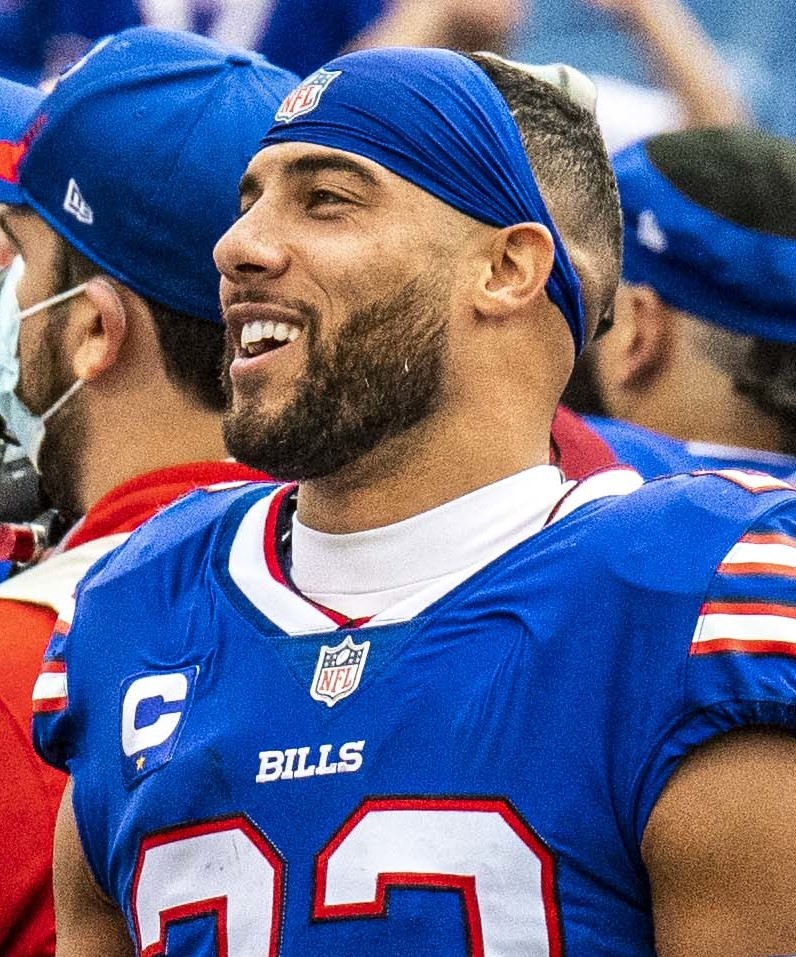
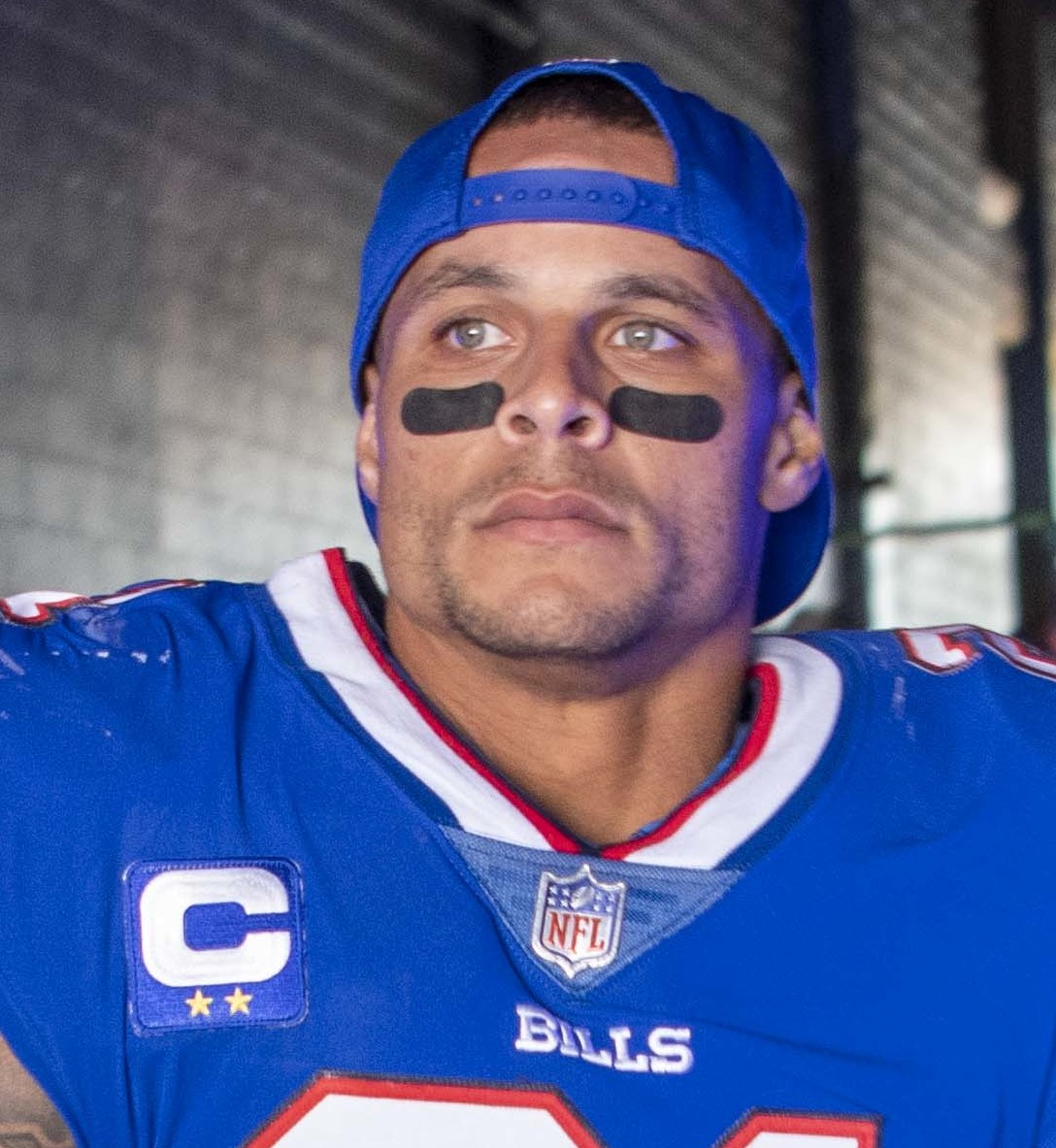
Tre'Davious White (top), Micah Hyde (middle) and Jordan Poyer (bottom) were integral players in Buffalo's defensive secondary during the McDermott era.

=== 2019 ===
The Bills freed up cap space after paying off the dead money for players from the Whaley era they had cut or traded. Prior to the season, numerous offensive players, such as receivers John Brown, Cole Beasley, and Andre Roberts, center Mitch Morse, running backs Frank Gore and T. J. Yeldon, and others were added in free agency, with general manager Brandon Beane dismissing the notion that "players don't want to play for Buffalo". The team also drafted defensive tackle Ed Oliver in the first round of the draft to replace Kyle Williams. Running back LeSean McCoy, who was an integral part of the offense, was one of the final preseason cuts after a strong preseason by rookie halfback Devin Singletary.

The Bills clinched their second playoff appearance in three years with a 17–10 victory over the Pittsburgh Steelers in week 15, in addition to their first season with 10 or more wins in the 21st century. Buffalo entered the playoffs as the AFC's 5th seed, but lost the wild card round to the Houston Texans 22–19 in overtime, despite leading that game 16–0 in the third quarter.

=== 2020 ===
During the offseason, the Bills traded their first-round draft pick and several other selections for receiver Stefon Diggs, formerly of the Minnesota Vikings, and a late round draft pick. They also signed several free agent defensive linemen such as Mario Addison and Vernon Butler. Due to the COVID-19 pandemic, training camp was not held at St. John Fisher College for the first time since 2000, moving to the team facility in Orchard Park in similar fashion as all other teams in the league.

Buffalo started strong thanks to a high-powered passing attack, with Josh Allen enjoying a breakout year, though the defense regressed from the previous two years early in the season. Despite back-to-back losses in weeks 5–6 to the Tennessee Titans and the Kansas City Chiefs, the reigning Super Bowl champions, the Bills won nine of their next ten games, clinching their first AFC East division title since 1995 after a week 15 win over the Denver Broncos. The Bills went on to win 13 games, tying the franchise record set in 1990 and 1991. They also swept their entire division for the first time in franchise history.

As the number two seed in the AFC, the Bills hosted their first home playoff game in 24 years, against the Indianapolis Colts. The Bills won 27–24, their first playoff win in 25 years.

The Bills went on to defeat the Baltimore Ravens 17–3 in the divisional round, advancing to the AFC Championship round. The Bills re-matched against the Chiefs in their first AFC Championship game since the 1993–94 season, but were defeated 38–24.

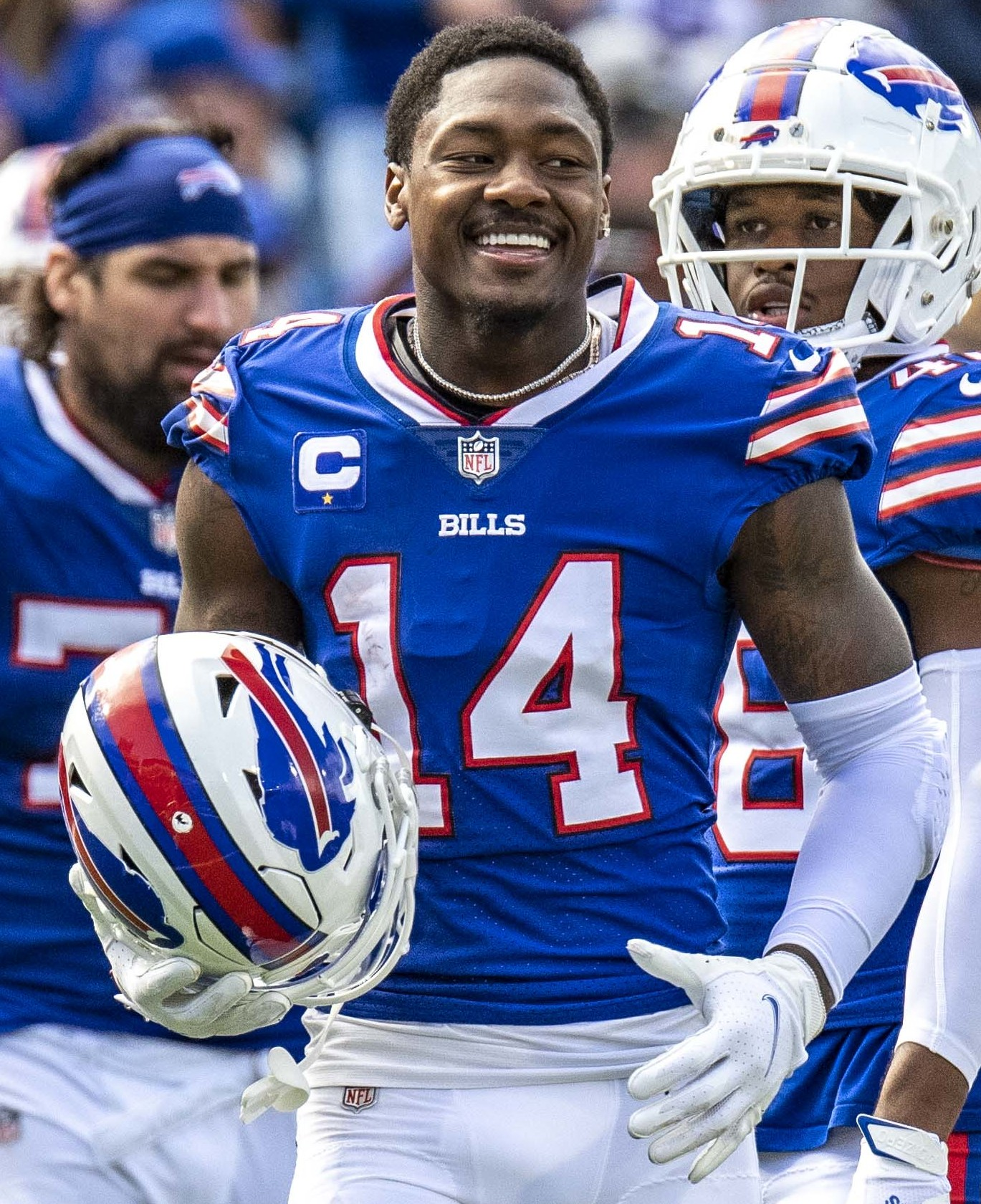
Receiver Stefon Diggs, acquired from Minnesota in 2020, broke several records during his tenure with Buffalo.

=== 2021 ===
In the offseason, Allen signed a 6-year, $258 million contract extension with the Bills, keeping him on the team through 2028. To back him up, Buffalo signed former Chicago Bears quarterback Mitchell Trubisky to a 1-year deal, replacing the departing Matt Barkley. In an effort to bolster their defense, the Bills drafted defensive linemen including Gregory Rousseau and Carlos "Boogie" Basham.

After a week 1 loss to the Pittsburgh Steelers, the Bills won the next four games in dominant fashion, which included two shutout wins and a victory over the Chiefs, before some midseason struggles, including an upset loss to the Urban Meyer-coached Jacksonville Jaguars. Following a close loss to the Tom Brady-led Tampa Bay Buccaneers, the Bills closed out the season with another 4-game winning streak, including their third win over the Patriots in two years, to clinch their second consecutive AFC East division title despite failing to match their 13–3 record from the previous year. Buffalo also finished with the league's top defense in several metrics.

Claiming the 3rd seed with an 11–6 record, the Bills hosted New England in the wild card round, winning 47–17 as they scored a touchdown on all their offensive possessions aside from the final kneeldowns and never punted or turned the ball over, a first in NFL history. They faced Kansas City in the playoffs again during the divisional round. In what would become regarded as one of the greatest playoff games in recent NFL history, the Chiefs won 42–36 in overtime. Despite another playoff loss to Kansas City, Josh Allen played well, at one point out-performing Chiefs quarterback Patrick Mahomes until the final 13 seconds and overtime.

=== 2022 ===
The Bills made a high-profile free agent signing, as All-Pro pass rusher Von Miller, formerly of the Denver Broncos and Los Angeles Rams, was added to the roster after signing a six-year deal worth up to $120 million nearly ten years to the date of the Mario Williams signing. Hyped up as the "Super Bowl favorites" prior to the season, the Bills matched a franchise record by winning 13 games during the season and won their third consecutive AFC East division title. However, several events that occurred to the team and the city of Buffalo, including the 2022 Buffalo shooting, two deadly winter blizzards, and near-fatal medical emergencies to both co-owner Kim Pegula prior to the season and safety Damar Hamlin during the Bills' later-cancelled week 17 game against the Cincinnati Bengals, contributed to what several players described as an "emotionally draining" season. The team's performance noticeably declined during the playoffs, as the Bills barely won in the wild card round against a Miami Dolphins team down to their third-string quarterback before losing in the divisional round to the Bengals in blowout fashion.

==== Damar Hamlin injury ====
On January 2, 2023, Bills safety Damar Hamlin collapsed after tackling Tee Higgins of the Cincinnati Bengals with 5:58 left in the first quarter. Cardiopulmonary resuscitation (CPR) was administered on the field and a defribillator was used. He was transported by ambulance to the University of Cincinnati Medical Center. There he was intubated and listed in critical condition. He was discharged nine days later on January 11. The game against the Bengals was postponed until further notice at 10:01pm by the NFL after communication with the NFLPA. The game was deemed a No Contest by the NFL on January 5. The serious nature of Hamlin's injury drew national attention, and after extensive rehab, Hamlin was cleared to play the next season, albeit in a more limited role.

=== 2023 ===
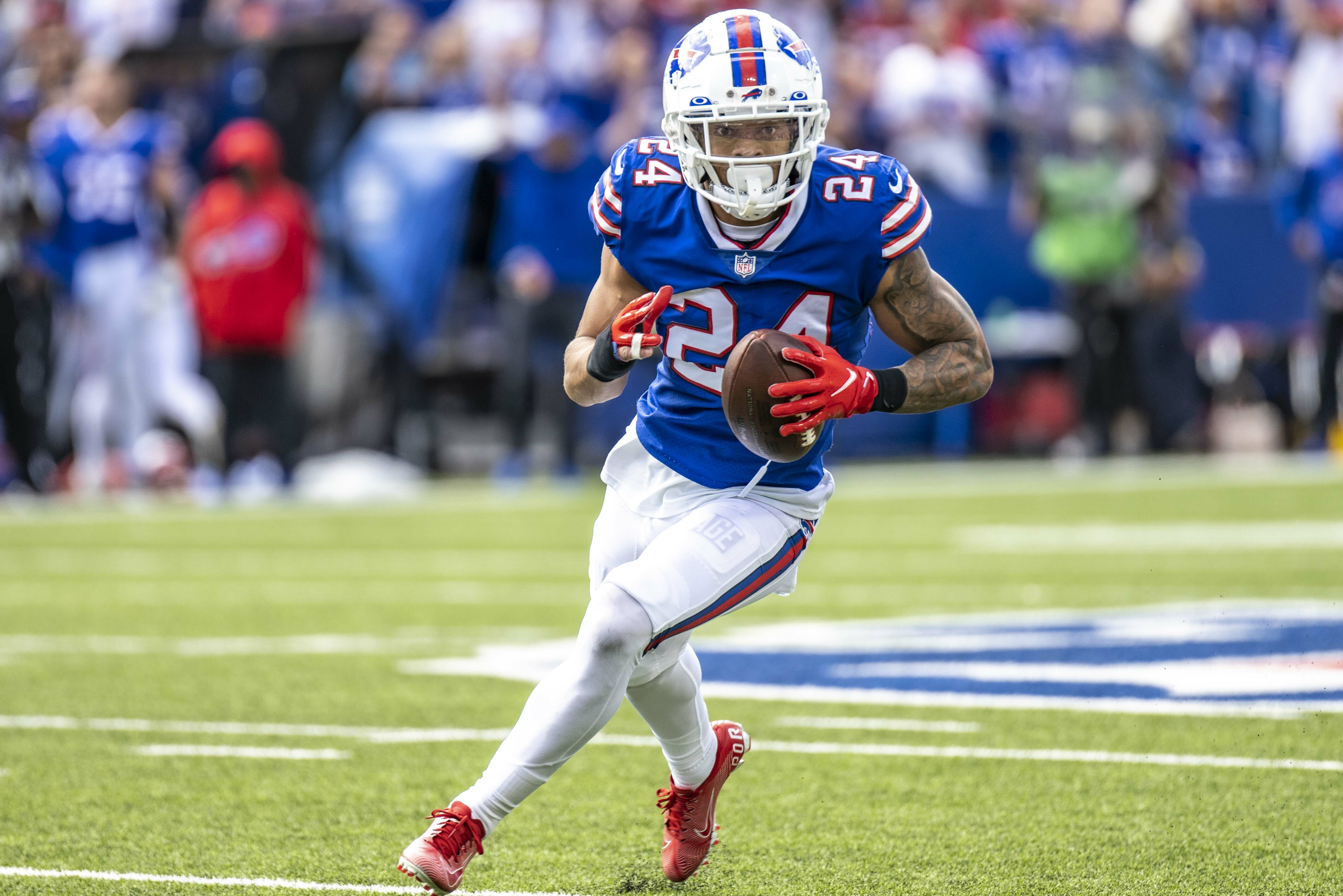
Slot cornerback Taron Johnson, whose success allowed the Bills to commit to a base nickel defense under McDermott, won a second-team All-Pro award for his play in 2023

Fresh off a tumultuous season and with rumored tension brewing between Allen and Diggs, Buffalo started off the 2023 season on Monday Night Football against the Jets, now led by former Green Bay Packer Aaron Rodgers at quarterback. Despite Rodgers suffering a season-ending injury four plays into the game, the Bills lost after the Jets defense forced Allen into four turnovers. Buffalo won their next three games, including a 48–20 win over Miami, before entering a six-game midseason slump in which the offense struggled and the defense lost three starters to injury, namely Tre'Davious White, DaQuan Jones, and Matt Milano. Following losses to the Bengals and Broncos, offensive coordinator Ken Dorsey was fired and replaced by quarterbacks coach Joe Brady.

Departing from Dorsey's former air raid approach that focused mostly on passing, Brady sought a more balanced approach that put more emphasis on the rushing attack. Despite mounting pressure on head coach Sean McDermott to save the team's season and an exposé article that revealed McDermott's controversial comments regarding the attackers in the September 11 attacks, the team threw their support behind him and Brady, winning six of their final seven games, including a Week 18 "AFC East divisional title" game over the Dolphins, to clinch their fourth consecutive division title. After beating the Pittsburgh Steelers in the wild card game, Buffalo lost another divisional round game, this time to the Chiefs again, with kicker Tyler Bass's potential game-tying field goal attempt missing wide right in similar fashion to Scott Norwood's infamous miss in Super Bowl XXV.

Diggs was traded to the Houston Texans following the 2023 season, forcing the team to take an exceptionally large dead cap hit.

=== 2024 ===
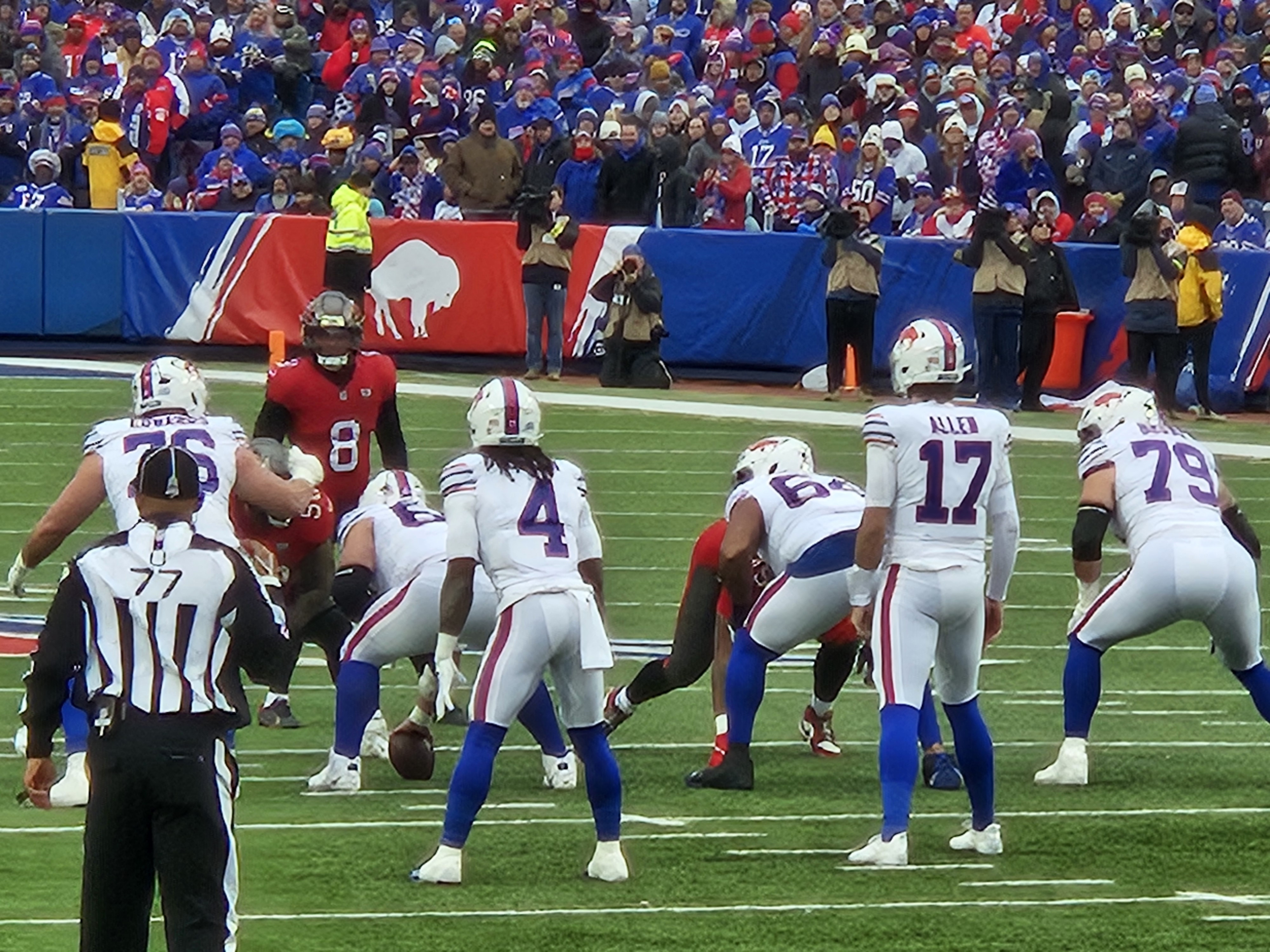
The Bills refocused their offense on running back James Cook (#4) under Joe Brady's tenure as offensive coordinator

To replace Diggs and fellow receiver Gabe Davis, the Bills signed journeymen Mack Hollins and Curtis Samuel, drafted wide receiver Keon Coleman, and conducted a midseason trade bringing Amari Cooper to Buffalo, while further developing its existing offensive roster and relying more on the run game led by James Cook and rookie Ray Davis. The approach was dubbed "Everybody Eats" in that a roster of equally talented players gave Allen a wider variety of options and would prevent the defense from keying on one star receiver. On defense, Hamlin, after seeing limited action in 2023, rose to become the team's starting free safety in 2024, as Micah Hyde remained unsigned until deciding to return for one last season, taking a practice squad role upon his return.

On December 11, 2024, the NFL approved the sale of 20.6% of the Buffalo Bills franchise to a consortium of private equity firms, the first time private equity firms had been approved to own a stake in an NFL franchise. 10% of the franchise will be held by Arctos, while the remaining 10.6% will be divided among executives at Acrew Capital, Bank of America, Gridiron Capital, Meritech Capital, and Accel-KKR, along with Toronto-based professional athletes Jozy Altidore, Vince Carter and Tracy McGrady.

Buffalo finished with a 13–4 regular season record, their best in a full 17-game schedule, and Josh Allen was awarded the AP NFL Most Valuable Player Award for his play that year. The Bills routed the Broncos in the Wild Card round of the playoffs and narrowly beat the Baltimore Ravens in a tightly-contested divisional round game, which was decided when Ravens tight end Mark Andrews dropped a potential game-tying 2-point conversion near the end of regulation. In a show of sportsmanship and compassion, Bills fans donated to Andrews' charity following the game. Buffalo would once again fall to Kansas City in the conference championship game 32–29, in which there were a couple of controversial calls by officiating, including a quarterback sneak by Allen on a crucial 4th-quarter 4th-down that was deemed short. Several players, analysts, and even some on the Bills' roster disagreed with the call, which ultimately played a role in the Chiefs advancing to their third straight Super Bowl appearance.

=== 2025 ===
In their final season in the former Ralph Wilson Stadium, the Bills started the season 4–0, starting with a thrilling comeback win over Baltimore in week 1. However, a week 5 loss to the Patriots, who would later win the division and end Buffalo's string of AFC East championships, began a string of games in which Buffalo underperformed, with upset losses to the Atlanta Falcons and Miami Dolphins. Josh Allen struggled in the passing game, with commentators noticing an increase in his time to throw and sacks taken, as his receivers, especially Curtis Samuel and Keon Coleman, were criticized. General manager Brandon Beane and Joe Brady likewise attracted criticism; Beane for his perceived inability to sign, draft, or trade for star receivers to effectively replace Stefon Diggs, and Brady for his playcalling at times. In addition, the run defense became a glaring weakness on the team. Defensive starters Ed Oliver, Michael Hoecht, and Terrel Bernard suffered injuries and the Bills were forced to resign former players such as Tre'Davious White, Jordan Poyer, and receiver Gabe Davis. Nonetheless, the Bills still managed a 12–5 record on the season with James Cook winning the league rushing title. They secured the sixth seed in the playoffs.

In the wild card round, Buffalo managed to win its first road playoff game against the Liam Coen-coached Jacksonville Jaguars. They faced the Broncos in Denver in the divisional round. Despite turning the ball over five times, with Allen accounting for four of those turnovers, the Bills took the game to overtime. While driving for a potential game-winning field goal in the extra period, Allen threw the ball to mid-season signing Brandin Cooks, who appeared to catch the ball, but upon rolling on the ground, he lost the ball to Broncos cornerback Ja'Quan McMillian, who was credited with an interception. Denver subsequently drove for a game-winning field goal, aided by several penalties on the Bills, ending Buffalo's Super Bowl aspirations once again. Following the Bills' loss to the Broncos, Sean McDermott was fired as head coach on January 19, 2026, while Beane was retained and promoted to President of Football Operations by Terry Pegula and tasked with leading the search for McDermott's replacement. The moves received a mixed response from fans, analysts, and players, with the decision to promote Beane while firing McDermott receiving harsh criticism.

=== 2026 season ===
On January 27, 2026, Joe Brady was promoted to head coach following a series of interviews, as the Bills also considered other candidates such as former offensive coordinator Brian Daboll, Jaguars offensive coordinator Grant Udinski, Broncos passing game coordinator Davis Webb, and former NFL quarterback Philip Rivers.

== 2026–present: Highmark Stadium and Joe Brady ==
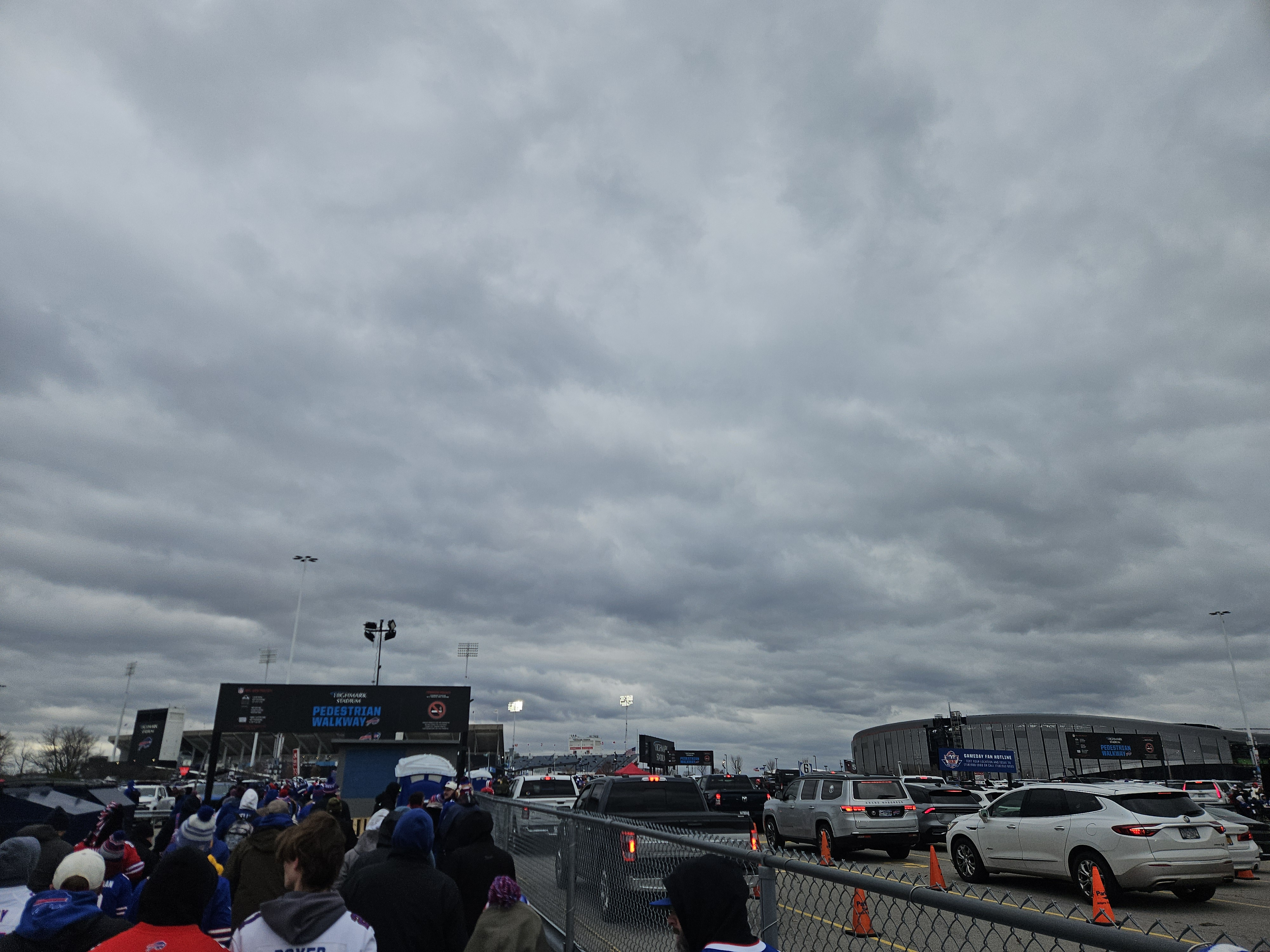
The new Highmark Stadium under construction (right) next to the old stadium (left) in 2025

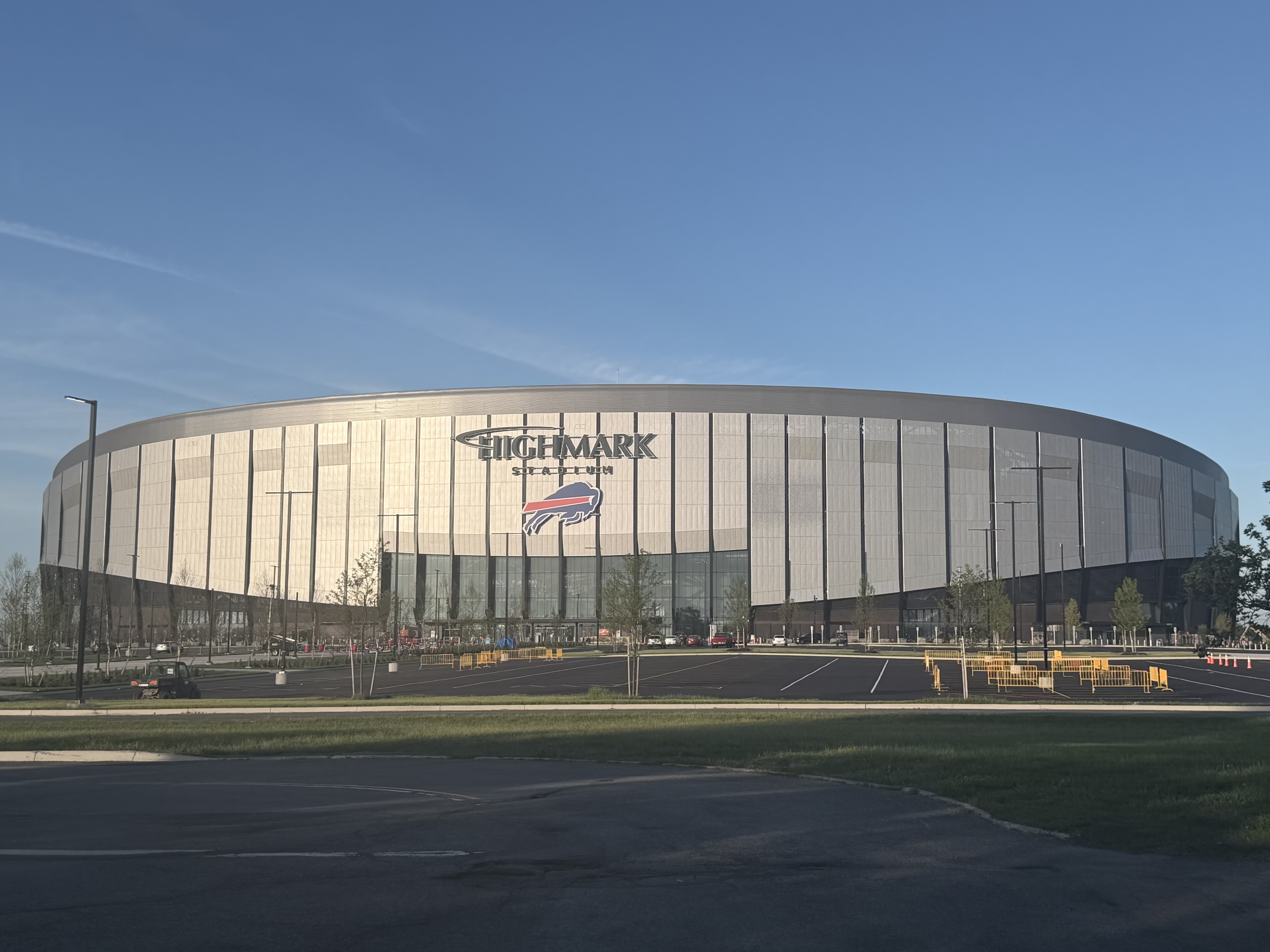
Highmark Stadium in 2026

On December 21, 2012, team CEO Russ Brandon, New York Governor Andrew Cuomo, and Erie County Executive Mark Poloncarz announced a new 10-year lease for Ralph Wilson Stadium. Included in the terms were $130 million in renovations and a $400 million penalty if the team relocated out of Buffalo (in addition to the NFL re-locating fee). A buyout window was inserted into the lease that allowed the team to cancel the lease for a reduced $28 million fee after the 2019 season. The lease included the team paying for part of the renovations for the first time. The deal also called for a committee to explore building a new stadium in the Buffalo vicinity, a proposal the Pegulas eventually began pursuing in 2019. On January 31, 2020, the Bills sent a formal letter to county executive Mark Poloncarz stating they would not exercise the buyout window.

After the team reached a deal with the state of New York and Erie County after the 2022 season to construct a new stadium next to the current site, construction began afterwards with a completion date before the 2026 season.

=== 2026 season ===
On January 27, 2026, Joe Brady was promoted to head coach following a series of interviews, as the Bills also considered other candidates such as former offensive coordinator Brian Daboll, Jaguars offensive coordinator Grant Udinski, Broncos passing game coordinator Davis Webb, and former NFL quarterback Philip Rivers.
