= 1968 Boston Patriots season =

Season of American Football League team the Boston Patriots

- Owner: Billy Sullivan
- General manager: Mike Holovak
- Head coach: Mike Holovak
- Home stadium: Fenway Park

Results
- Record: 4–10
- Division place: 4th AFL Eastern
- Playoffs: Did not qualify
- All-Pros: Jim Whalen
- AFL All-Stars: DT Houston Antwine; WR/K Gino Cappelletti; CB Leroy Mitchell; C Jon Morris; T Tom Neville

Uniform

The 1968 Boston Patriots season was the franchise's ninth season in the American Football League. The Patriots ended the season with a record of four wins and ten losses, and finished fourth in the AFL's Eastern Division. The Patriots played their final season of home games at Fenway Park before moving to Alumni Stadium on the campus of Boston College for the following season.

== Offseason ==
=== NFL draft ===
1968 Boston Patriots draft
Round	Pick	Player	Position	College	Notes
1	6	Dennis Byrd	DT	NC State	
2	32	Tom Funchess	T	Jackson State	
3	60	Aaron Marsh	WR	Eastern Kentucky	
4	88	R. C. Gamble	RB	South Carolina State	
Made roster † Pro Football Hall of Fame * Made at least one Pro Bowl during career

=== Undrafted free agents ===
1968 undrafted free agents of note
Player	Position	College
Fred Grasso	Wide receiver	Hofstra

== Personnel ==
=== Staff / Coaches ===
1968 Boston Patriots staff
Front office: President – Billy Sullivan; Director of Player Personnel – Rommie Loudd; Head coaches: Head coach/General Manager – Mike Holovak; Offensive coaches: Offensive backfield – Tom Yewcic; Offensive line – Art Spinney	Defensive coaches: Defensive line – Jesse Richardson; Defensive backfield – Claude Gibson

=== Final roster ===
1968 Boston Patriots roster
Quarterbacks (QB): 15 King Corcoran; 14 Tom Sherman; Running backs (RB): 13 R. C. Gamble; 48 Preston Johnson; 35 Jim Nance; Wide receivers (WR): 20 Gino Cappelletti K; 81 Jim Colclough; 84 Art Graham; 29 Aaron Marsh; 31 Bill Murphy; 46 Bob Scarpitto P; Tight ends (TE): 87 Bobby Nichols; 82 Jim Whalen	Offensive linemen (OL): 64 Jim Boudreaux T; 63 Justin Canale G; 66 Paul Feldhausen T; 73 Tom Funchess T; 76 Charlie Long G; 56 Jon Morris C; 77 Tom Neville T; 71 Don Oakes T; 60 Len St. Jean G; Defensive linemen (DL): 65 Houston Antwine DT; 78 Dennis Byrd DE/DT; 67 Whit Canale DE; 79 Jim Lee Hunt DT/DE; 75 Ed Toner DT; 70 Mel Witt DE	Linebackers (LB): 50 Jim Cheyunski MLB; 45 Ray Ilg MLB; 54 Ed Koontz OLB; 52 Ed Philpott OLB; 58 Doug Satcher OLB; 55 J. R. Williamson OLB; Defensive backs (DB): 25 John Charles SS; 47 Billy Johnson CB/S; 23 Daryl Johnson CB; 28 Art McMahon FS; 41 Leroy Mitchell CB; 27 Willie Porter CB; Special teams (ST): 36 Terry Swanson P	Reserve: 85 Nick Buoniconti LB (IR); 72 Larry Eisenhauer DE (IR); 40 Larry Garron RB (IR); 44 John Outlaw CB (IR); 17 Mike Taliaferro QB (IR); 42 Don Webb S (IR); Rookies in italics 41 active, 6 reserve, 0 practice squad

== Standings ==
AFL Eastern Division
	W	L	T	PCT	DIV	PF	PA	STK
New York Jets	11	3	0	.786	7–1	419	280	W4
Houston Oilers	7	7	0	.500	5–3	303	248	W2
Miami Dolphins	5	8	1	.385	4–3–1	276	355	L1
Boston Patriots	4	10	0	.286	2–6	229	406	L2
Buffalo Bills	1	12	1	.077	1–6–1	199	367	L8

Note: Tie games were not officially counted in the standings in the AFL.

== Game-by-game results ==
Week	Date	Opponent	Result	Record	Venue	Attendance	Recap
1	September 8	at **Buffalo Bills**	**W** 16–7	1–0	War Memorial Stadium	38,865	Recap
2	Bye						
3	September 22	**New York Jets**	**L** 31–47	1–1	Legion Field, Birmingham, AL	22,002	Recap
4	September 29	at Denver Broncos	**W** 20–17	2–1	Mile High Stadium	37,024	Recap
5	October 6	at Oakland Raiders	**L** 10–41	2–2	Oakland–Alameda County Coliseum	44,253	Recap
6	October 13	**Houston Oilers**	**L** 0–16	2–3	Fenway Park	32,502	Recap
7	October 20	**Buffalo Bills**	**W** 23–6	3–3	Fenway Park	21,082	Recap
8	October 27	at **New York Jets**	**L** 14–48	3–4	Shea Stadium	62,351	Recap
9	November 3	Denver Broncos	**L** 14–35	3–5	Fenway Park	18,304	Recap
10	November 10	San Diego Chargers	**L** 17–27	3–6	Fenway Park	19,278	Recap
11	November 17	at Kansas City Chiefs	**L** 17–31	3–7	Municipal Stadium	48,271	Recap
12	November 24	**Miami Dolphins**	**L** 10–34	3–8	Fenway Park	18,305	Recap
13	December 1	Cincinnati Bengals	**W** 33–14	4–8	Fenway Park	17,796	Recap
14	December 8	at **Miami Dolphins**	**L** 7–38	4–9	Miami Orange Bowl	24,242	Recap
15	December 15	at **Houston Oilers**	**L** 17–45	4–10	Houston Astrodome	34,198	Recap
Note: Intra-division opponents are in **bold** text.

=== Game summaries ===
==== Week 1 ====
Team	1	2	3	4	Total
• Patriots	0	3	10	3	16
Bills	7	0	0	0	7

- Date: September 8
- Location: War Memorial Stadium, Buffalo, New York
- Game weather: 62 °F (17 °C), wind 6 mph

Scoring summary
1	BUF	Paul Costa 6 yard run (Mike Mercer kick)	Bills 7–0
2	BOS	Gino Cappelletti 10 yard field goal	Bills 7–3
3	BOS	R.C. Gamble 45 yard run (Gino Capplletti kick)	Patriots 10–7
3	BOS	Gino Cappelletti 28 yard field goal	Patriots 13–7
4	BOS	Gino Cappelletti 30 yard field goal	Patriots 16–7
