= 1970 Boston Patriots season =

Season of National Football League team the Boston Patriots

- Owner: Billy Sullivan
- General manager: George Sauer
- Head coach: Clive Rush (quit, medical reasons; 1–6); John Mazur (interim, 1–6)
- Home stadium: Harvard Stadium

Results
- Record: 2–12
- Division place: 5th AFC East
- Playoffs: Did not qualify
- All-Pros: None
- Pro Bowlers: C Jon Morris

Uniform

The 1970 Boston Patriots season was the franchise's first season in the National Football League and eleventh overall. They ended the season with a record of two wins and twelve losses, fifth (last) in the AFC East Division.

This was the final season as the “Boston” Patriots, as they moved southwest to Foxborough, Massachusetts the next season and became the “New England” Patriots. The final season as Boston did not go as planned, as the Patriots struggled all season and finished 2–12, the worst record in the NFL. Home games in 1970 were played at Harvard Stadium, their fourth home venue and third in as many seasons.

After taking the season opener at home from the Miami Dolphins, Boston lost nine in a row before beating the Buffalo Bills on the road. The season concluded with an embarrassing 45–7 loss to the Bengals in Cincinnati.

Head coach Clive Rush, age 39, quit midway through the season because of medical reasons, with Boston's record at 1–6. His replacement, offensive backfield coach John Mazur, did not do much better of a job, but he continued as head coach the next season. The Patriots scored the fewest points in the league in 1970 with 149, and allowed 361; they missed the playoffs for the seventh straight season.

Despite being a Super Bowl quarterback, no NFL team made contact with 32-year-old Joe Kapp until after the start of the regular season. Prior to the 1969 season, the Minnesota Vikings had exercised the option clause of his contract, so Kapp had played the entire season without a new contract. It was unusual for teams to use the team's option and not to offer a new contract prior to a season. This dispute made him a free agent for the 1970 season, by the NFL's own rules. The Patriots signed him on October 2 to a four-year contract, making him the highest paid player in the league. The Patriots had to give up strong safety John Charles and a first-round draft pick in 1972 (used to select Stanford linebacker Jeff Siemon). Kapp's first appearance was on October 11 at Kansas City, relieving starter Mike Taliaferro in the third quarter of a 23–10 loss to the team which manhandled Kapp and the Vikings in the Super Bowl nine months prior.

November losses vs. the Buffalo Bills (45–10) and St. Louis Cardinals (31–0) marked the last time the Patriots were beaten by 30 or more points in consecutive games until 2023.

The Vikings paid Kapp back in full in week 13, rolling to a 35–14 victory in the Patriots' final game at Harvard and in Boston prior to the move to Foxborough. The game had an unusual noon EST (11 a.m. CST) kickoff to avoid ending the game in darkness, as Harvard Stadium did not have permanent light standards and would not until 2006.

The Patriots' poor record was the worst in the 26-team league, but gave them the first overall selection in the 1971 NFL draft. They took quarterback Jim Plunkett, the Heisman Trophy winner from Stanford, upset winner of the Rose Bowl.

== Offseason ==
=== NFL draft ===
1970 Boston Patriots draft
Round	Pick	Player	Position	College	Notes
1	4	Phil Olsen	Defensive tackle	Utah State	Injured prior to the season
3	56	Mike Ballou	Linebacker	UCLA	
4	83	Eddie Ray	Running back	LSU	
5	107	Bob Olson	Linebacker	Notre Dame	
7	160	Odell Lawson	Running back	Langston	
9	212	Dennis Wirgowski	Defensive end	Purdue	
10	239	Henry Brown	Wide receiver	Missouri	
11	264	Dennis Bramlett	Tackle	UTEP	
12	291	Greg Roero	Defensive tackle	New Mexico Highlands	
13	316	Ronnie Shelley	Defensive back	Troy State	
14	343	Garvie Craw	Running back	Michigan	
15	368	Kent Schoolfield	Wide receiver	Florida A&M	
16	395	Otis McDaniel	Defensive end	Tuskegee	
17	420	Joe Killingsworth	Wide receiver	Oklahoma	
Made roster * Made at least one Pro Bowl during career

== Staff ==
1970 Boston Patriots staff
Front office: President – Billy Sullivan; General manager – George Sauer; Director of player personnel – Rommie Loudd; Head coaches: Head coach – Clive Rush; Offensive coaches: Interim head coach/offense – John Mazur; Backs/receivers – Jerry Stoltz; Offensive line – Bruce Beatty	Defensive coaches: Defense – Bill Elias; Defensive line – Jesse Richardson; Linebackers – John Meyer

== Roster ==
1970 Boston Patriots roster
Quarterbacks (QB): 11 Joe Kapp; 17 Mike Taliaferro; Running backs (RB): 22 Sid Blanks; 30 Carl Garrett; 24 Bob Gladieux; 32 Odell Lawson; 35 Jim Nance; Wide receivers (WR): 84 Gayle Knief; 33 Bill Rademacher; 34 Ron Sellers; 40 Bake Turner; Tight ends (TE): 82 Tom Beer; 86 Barry Brown	Offensive linemen (OL): 67 Gary Bugenhagen G; 66 Angelo Loukas G; 64 Mike Montler G/T; 56 Jon Morris C; 77 Tom Neville T; 60 Len St. Jean G; Defensive linemen (DL): 65 Houston Antwine DT; 88 Ron Berger DE; 74 Jim Lee Hunt DT; 76 Rex Mirich DT; 85 Dennis Wirgowski DE; 71 Mel Witt DE	Linebackers (LB): 51 Mike Ballou OLB; 57 John Bramlett OLB; 52 Ed Philpott OLB; 54 Marty Schottenheimer MLB; 53 Fred Whittingham MLB; 55 J. R. Williamson OLB; Defensive backs (DB): 27 Randy Beverly CB; 41 Larry Carwell CB; 23 Daryl Johnson CB; 44 John Outlaw CB; 26 Clarence Scott SS; 42 Don Webb FS; Special teams (ST): 20 Gino Cappelletti K; 7 Charlie Gogolak K; 21 Tom Janik P	Practice squad: 14 Brian Dowling QB; 81 Charley Frazier WR; 15 Kim Hammond QB; 36 Eddie Ray RB; Reserve: 50 Jim Cheyunski LB (IR); 73 Tom Funchess T (IR); 47 Bill Johnson CB (IR); 87 Ike Lassiter DE (IR); 70 Otis McDaniel DE (IR); 28 Art McMahon S (IR); 72 Phil Olsen DT (IR); 58 Bob Olson LB (IR); 75 Ed Toner DT (IR); Rookies in italics

== Regular season ==
=== Schedule ===
Week	Date	Opponent	Result	Record	Venue	Attendance	Recap
1	September 20	**Miami Dolphins**	**W** 27–14	1–0	Harvard Stadium	32,607	Recap
2	September 27	**New York Jets**	**L** 21–31	1–1	Harvard Stadium	36,040	Recap
3	October 4	**Baltimore Colts**	**L** 6–14	1–2	Harvard Stadium	38,235	Recap
4	October 11	at Kansas City Chiefs	**L** 10–23	1–3	Municipal Stadium	50,698	Recap
5	October 18	New York Giants	**L** 0–16	1–4	Harvard Stadium	39,091	Recap
6	October 25	at **Baltimore Colts**	**L** 3–27	1–5	Memorial Stadium	60,240	Recap
7	November 1	**Buffalo Bills**	**L** 10–45	1–6	Harvard Stadium	31,148	Recap
8	November 8	at St. Louis Cardinals	**L** 0–31	1–7	Busch Memorial Stadium	46,466	Recap
9	November 15	San Diego Chargers	**L** 14–16	1–8	Harvard Stadium	30,597	Recap
10	November 22	at **New York Jets**	**L** 3–17	1–9	Shea Stadium	61,822	Recap
11	November 29	at **Buffalo Bills**	**W** 14–10	2–9	War Memorial Stadium	31,427	Recap
12	December 6	at **Miami Dolphins**	**L** 20–37	2–10	Miami Orange Bowl	51,032	Recap
13	December 13	Minnesota Vikings	**L** 14–35	2–11	Harvard Stadium	37,819	Recap
14	December 20	at Cincinnati Bengals	**L** 7–45	2–12	Riverfront Stadium	60,157	Recap
Note: Intra-division opponents are in **bold** text.

=== Standings ===
AFC East
	W	L	T	PCT	DIV	CONF	PF	PA	STK
Baltimore Colts	11	2	1	.846	6–1–1	8–2–1	321	234	W4
Miami Dolphins	10	4	0	.714	6–2	8–3	297	228	W6
New York Jets	4	10	0	.286	2–6	2–9	255	286	L3
Buffalo Bills	3	10	1	.231	3–4–1	3–7–1	204	337	L5
Boston Patriots	2	12	0	.143	2–6	2–9	149	361	L3

Note: Tie games were not officially counted in the standings until 1972.
