= 1969 Boston Patriots season =

Season of American Football League team the Boston Patriots

- Owner: Billy Sullivan
- General manager: George Sauer
- Head coach: Clive Rush
- Home stadium: Alumni Stadium

Results
- Record: 4–10
- Division place: T-3rd AFL Eastern
- Playoffs: Did not qualify
- All-Pros: None
- AFL All-Stars: RB Carl Garrett; DT Jim Lee Hunt; C Jon Morris; WR Ron Sellers; QB Mike Taliaferro; S Don Web

Uniform

The 1969 Boston Patriots season was the franchise's 10th and final season in the American Football League. The Patriots ended the season with a record of four wins and ten losses, and finished tied for third in the AFL's Eastern Division.

== Offseason ==
=== NFL draft ===
1969 Boston Patriots draft
Round	Pick	Player	Position	College	Notes
1	6	Ron Sellers	WR	Florida State	
Made roster † Pro Football Hall of Fame * Made at least one Pro Bowl during career

== Personnel ==
=== Staff / Coaches ===
1969 Boston Patriots staff
Front office: President – Billy Sullivan; General Manager – George Sauer; Director of Player Personnel – Rommie Loudd; Head coaches: Head Coach – Clive Rush; Offensive coaches: Offensive Backfield – John Mazur; Receivers – Jerry Stoltz; Offensive Line – Bruce Beatty	Defensive coaches: Defensive Line – Jesse Richardson; Linebackers – John Meyer; Defensive Backfield – Bill Elias

=== Roster ===
1969 Boston Patriots roster
Quarterbacks (QB): 15 Kim Hammond; 17 Mike Taliaferro; Running backs (RB): 22 Sid Blanks; 13 R. C. Gamble; 30 Carl Garrett; 24 Bob Gladieux; 35 Jim Nance; Wide receivers (WR): 81 Charley Frazier; 29 Aaron Marsh; 33 Bill Rademacher; 49 Tom Richardson; 34 Ron Sellers; Tight ends (TE): 83 Barry Brown; 82 Jim Whalen	Offensive linemen (OL): 73 Tom Funchess T; 74 Ezell Jones T; 76 Charlie Long G; 64 Mike Montler G; 56 Jon Morris C; 77 Tom Neville T; 60 Len St. Jean G; Defensive linemen (DL): 65 Houston Antwine DT; 62 John Cagle DE; 72 Larry Eisenhauer DE; 80 Karl Henke DE; 87 Ray Jacobs DE; 79 Jim Lee Hunt DT; 75 Ed Toner DT; 70 Mel Witt DE	Linebackers (LB): 57 John Bramlett OLB; 50 Jim Cheyunski MLB; 36 Ken Herock MLB; 52 Ed Philpott OLB; 54 Marty Schottenheimer OLB; 55 J. R. Williamson OLB; Defensive backs (DB): 41 Larry Carwell CB; 25 John Charles SS; 23 Daryl Johnson CB; 28 Art McMahon FS; 44 John Outlaw CB; 26 Clarence Scott SS; 42 Don Webb FS; Special teams (ST): 20 Gino Cappelletti K; 21 Tom Janik P	Reserve: 51 Ronnie Caveness LB (IR); 47 Bill Johnson CB (IR); Rookies in italics 42 active, 2 reserve, 0 practice squad

== Schedule ==
Week	Date	Opponent	Result	Record	Venue	Attendance	Recap
1	September 14	at Denver Broncos	**L** 7–35	0–1	Mile High Stadium	43,679	Recap
2	September 21	Kansas City Chiefs	**L** 0–31	0–2	Alumni Stadium	22,002	Recap
3	September 28	Oakland Raiders	**L** 23–38	0–3	Alumni Stadium	19,069	Recap
4	October 5	**New York Jets**	**L** 14–23	0–4	Alumni Stadium	25,584	Recap
5	October 11	at **Buffalo Bills**	**L** 16–23	0–5	War Memorial Stadium	46,201	Recap
6	October 19	San Diego Chargers	**L** 10–13	0–6	Alumni Stadium	18,346	Recap
7	October 26	at **New York Jets**	**L** 17–23	0–7	Shea Stadium	62,298	Recap
8	November 2	**Houston Oilers**	**W** 24–0	1–7	Alumni Stadium	19,006	Recap
9	November 9	**Miami Dolphins**	**L** 16–17	1–8	Alumni Stadium	19,821	Recap
10	November 16	at Cincinnati Bengals	**W** 25–14	2–8	Nippert Stadium	27,927	Recap
11	November 23	**Buffalo Bills**	**W** 35–21	3–8	Alumni Stadium	25,584	Recap
12	November 30	at **Miami Dolphins**	**W** 38–23	4–8	Tampa Stadium	32,121	Recap
13	December 7	at San Diego Chargers	**L** 18–28	4–9	San Diego Stadium	33,146	Recap
14	December 14	at **Houston Oilers**	**L** 23–27	4–10	Houston Astrodome	39,215	Recap
Note: Intra-division opponents are in **bold** text.

== Standings ==
AFL Eastern Division
	W	L	T	PCT	DIV	PF	PA	STK
New York Jets	10	4	0	.714	8–0	353	269	W2
Houston Oilers	6	6	2	.500	5–3	278	279	W1
Boston Patriots	4	10	0	.286	3–5	266	316	L2
Buffalo Bills	4	10	0	.286	2–6	230	359	L2
Miami Dolphins	3	10	1	.231	2–6	233	332	L1

Note: Tie games were not officially counted in the standings of the AFL.
