= 1970 Kansas City Chiefs season =

NFL team season 1st NFL season

- Owner: Lamar Hunt
- General manager: Jack Steadman
- Head coach: Hank Stram
- Home stadium: Municipal Stadium

Results
- Record: 7–5–2
- Division place: 2nd AFC West
- Playoffs: Did not qualify
- Pro Bowlers: G Ed Budde; OT Jim Tyrer; DE Jerry Mays; DT Buck Buchanan; LB Bobby Bell; LB Willie Lanier; CB Jim Marsalis; S Johnny Robinson; K Jan Stenerud; P Jerrel Wilson

The 1970 Kansas City Chiefs season was the franchise's debut season in the National Football League, the eighth as the Kansas City Chiefs, and eleventh overall. It began with the Chiefs attempting to defend their Super Bowl IV championship title, but ended with a 7–5–2 record, missing the playoffs for the first time since 1967.

Following their championship success, the Chiefs traded running back Mike Garrett, the club's all-time leading rusher at the time, to San Diego after a week 3 loss in Denver, and replaced him in the lineup with Ed Podolak. Despite a 44–24 win on September 28 against the eventual Super Bowl V champion Baltimore on the second-ever telecast of ABC's Monday Night Football, the Chiefs were just 3–3–1 at the season's midpoint.

One of the season's pivotal junctures came in a 17–17 tie against Oakland on November 1. The Chiefs were ahead 17–14 when quarterback Len Dawson apparently sealed the win, running for a first down which would have allowed Kansas City to run out the clock. While on the ground, Dawson was speared by Raiders defensive end Ben Davidson in an infamous incident that cost the Chiefs a victory and further inflamed the already heated Chiefs–Raiders rivalry. Wide receiver Otis Taylor retaliated and a bench-clearing brawl ensued. Offsetting penalties were called, nullifying Dawson's first down. The Chiefs were forced to punt and Raiders kicker George Blanda eventually booted a game-tying field goal with eight seconds remaining. Following the tie with Oakland the Chiefs' defense would permit only 43 points over the next 5 weeks, which included 4 wins and 6–6 tie with the St. Louis Cardinals at Municipal Stadium. The Cardinals had come into that game with a streak of three straight shutout wins. The Chiefs' defense held St. Louis to a late Field Goal as the game ended 6–6. After a 16–0 shutout of Denver the Chiefs had played to a 6–1–2 record over the past nine weeks to stand 7–3–2 with two weeks to play and very much looked like a team with a chance to defend its championship.

Then came the big one at Oakland, the game that decided pro football's toughest division. The Saturday game on December 12 was a stand-alone NBC national telecast. The Chiefs scored first for a 3–0 lead, it was tied 6–6 at the half. But the Raiders, behind the angry running of fullback Marv Hubbard, dominated the second half in a 20–6 division-clinching win for Oakland.

The Chiefs had a slim hope for the AFC wild card berth in the playoffs, but needed a win by Buffalo (3–9–1) in Miami and to win their season finale at San Diego. Miami jumped to a 28–0 first quarter lead and rolled to a 45–7 win, finishing at 10–4 to secure the AFC wild card. Warming up to play the Chargers, the Chiefs saw the Miami blowout and knew their reign as champions was over. Eliminated from the postseason, the Chiefs played an uninspired sleepwalk game and lost 31–13.

In the end, it was that tie in November with Oakland that ultimately cost the Chiefs the AFC West division title; Kansas City finished at 7–5–2, while the Raiders were a game ahead at 8–4–2. The rules were changed several years later to assess such penalties as the Davidson-Taylor incident as dead-ball fouls after the play counted.

== Offseason ==
=== NFL draft ===
Round	Pick	Player	Position	School/Club team
1	26	Sid Smith	Offensive tackle	USC
2	52	Clyde Werner	Linebacker	Washington
3	61	Billy Bob Barnett	Defensive end	Texas A&M
3	78	David Hadley	Defensive back	Alcorn A&M
5	130	Mike Oriard	Center	Notre Dame
6	156	Robert Hews	Tackle	Princeton
7	182	Clyde Glosson	Wide receiver	Texas-El Paso
8	193	Fred Barry	Defensive back	Boston University
9	234	Charley Evans	Tackle	Texas Tech
10	260	Bob Stankovich	Guard	Arkansas
11	285	Bill O'Neal	Running back	Grambling
12	312	Rodney Fedorchak	Guard	Pittsburgh
13	338	Troy Patridge	Defensive end	Texas-Arlington
14	364	Glenn Dumont	Running back	American International
15	390	Bob Liggett	Defensive tackle	Nebraska
16	416	Randy Ross	Linebacker	Kansas State
17	442	Rayford Jenkins	Defensive back	Alcorn A&M

== Roster ==
1970 Kansas City Chiefs roster
Quarterbacks (QB): 16 Len Dawson; 10 Mike Livingston; Running backs (RB): 38 Wendell Hayes; 45 Robert Holmes; 6 Warren McVea; 14 Ed Podolak; Wide receivers (WR): 81 Jim Hines; 25 Frank Pitts; 30 Gloster Richardson; 89 Otis Taylor; Tight ends (TE): 80 Billy Cannon; 88 Morris Stroud	Offensive linemen (OL): 71 Ed Budde G; 60 George Daney G; 73 Dave Hill T; 55 E. J. Holub C; 76 Mo Moorman G; 50 Mike Oriard C; 58 Jack Rudnay C; 70 Sid Smith T; 77 Jim Tyrer T; Defensive linemen (DL): 86 Buck Buchanan DT; 61 Curley Culp DT; 62 Bob Liggett DT; 75 Jerry Mays DE; 66 Bob Stein DE	Linebackers (LB): 78 Bobby Bell OLB; 63 Willie Lanier MLB; 85 Chuck Hurston OLB; 51 Jim Lynch OLB; 54 Clyde Werner MLB; Defensive backs (DB): 24 Caesar Belser SS; 23 David Hadley CB; 46 Jim Kearney SS; 40 Jim Marsalis CB; 22 Willie Mitchell CB/S; 42 Johnny Robinson FS; 18 Emmitt Thomas CB; Special teams (ST): 3 Jan Stenerud K; 44 Jerrel Wilson P	Practice squad: 35 Richard Armstrong RB; 12 Tom Flores QB; 72 Bob Hews DE; 7 John Huarte QB; 26 Lew Porter WR; Reserve: 84 Fred Arbanas TE (IR); 87 Aaron Brown DE (IR); 65 Remi Prudhomme C (IR); 20 Goldie Sellers CB (IR); 81 Marvin Upshaw DE/DT (IR); Rookies in italics

== Preseason ==
Week	Date	Opponent	Result	Record	Venue	Attendance	Recap
1	July 31	vs. College All-Stars	W 24–3	1–0	Soldier Field (Chicago, IL)	55,032	Recap
2	August 8	at Detroit Lions	W 30–17	2–0	Tiger Stadium	55,032	Recap
3	August 14	Baltimore Colts	L 3–17	2–1	Municipal Stadium	34,341	Recap
4	August 22	vs. Cleveland Browns	W 16–13	3–1	Liberty Bowl (Memphis, TN)	31,532	Recap
5	August 29	at Atlanta Falcons	L 17–22	3–2	Atlanta Stadium	56,990	Recap
6	September 5	at Dallas Cowboys	W 13–0	4–2	Cotton Bowl	69,055	Recap
7	September 12	at St. Louis Cardinals	L 24–34	4–3	Busch Memorial Stadium	50,661	Recap

== Regular season ==
=== Schedule ===
Week	Date	Opponent	Result	Record	Venue	Attendance	Recap
1	September 20	at Minnesota Vikings	**L** 10–27	0–1	Metropolitan Stadium	47,900	Recap
2	September 28	at Baltimore Colts	**W** 44–24	1–1	Memorial Stadium	53,911	Recap
3	October 4	at **Denver Broncos**	**L** 13–26	1–2	Mile High Stadium	50,705	Recap
4	October 11	Boston Patriots	**W** 23–10	2–2	Municipal Stadium	50,698	Recap
5	October 18	at Cincinnati Bengals	**W** 27–19	3–2	Riverfront Stadium	57,265	Recap
6	October 25	Dallas Cowboys	**L** 16–27	3–3	Municipal Stadium	51,158	Recap
7	November 1	**Oakland Raiders**	**T** 17–17	3–3–1	Municipal Stadium	51,334	Recap
8	November 8	Houston Oilers	**W** 24–9	4–3–1	Municipal Stadium	49,810	Recap
9	November 15	at Pittsburgh Steelers	**W** 31–14	5–3–1	Three Rivers Stadium	50,081	Recap
10	November 22	St. Louis Cardinals	**T** 6–6	5–3–2	Municipal Stadium	50,711	Recap
11	November 29	**San Diego Chargers**	**W** 26–14	6–3–2	Municipal Stadium	50,315	Recap
12	December 6	**Denver Broncos**	**W** 16–0	7–3–2	Municipal Stadium	50,454	Recap
13	December 12	at **Oakland Raiders**	**L** 6–20	7–4–2	Oakland–Alameda County Coliseum	54,596	Recap
14	December 20	at **San Diego Chargers**	**L** 13–31	7–5–2	San Diego Stadium	41,379	Recap
Note: Intra-division opponents are in **bold** text.

=== Game summaries ===
==== Week 1: at Minnesota Vikings ====
Week 1: Kansas City Chiefs at Minnesota Vikings – Game summary

Quarter	1	2	3	4	Total
Chiefs	0	7	3	0	**10**
**Vikings**	0	17	0	10	**27**

at Metropolitan Stadium, Bloomington, Minnesota

- Date: September 20
- Game time: 3:00 p.m. CDT
- Game weather: 70 °F (21 °C)
- Game attendance: 47,900
- Referee: Tommy Bell
- TV announcers (NBC): Curt Gowdy and Kyle Rote
- Recap

Game information

**First quarter**

- No scoring plays.

**Second quarter**

- MIN – Fred Cox 20-yard field goal. Vikings 3–0.
- MIN – Roy Winston 36-yard fumble return (Fred Cox kick). Vikings 10–0.
- KC – Otis Taylor 59-yard pass from Len Dawson (Jan Stenerud kick). Vikings 10–7.
- MIN – Dave Osborn 1-yard run (Fred Cox kick). Vikings 17–7.

**Third quarter**

- KC – Jan Stenerud 26-yard field goal. Vikings 17–10.

**Fourth quarter**

- MIN – Oscar Reed 1-yard run (Fred Cox kick). Vikings 24–10.
- MIN – Fred Cox 40-yard field goal. Vikings 27–10.

**Top passers**

- KC – Len Dawson – 18/27, 164 yards, TD, 2 INT
- MIN – Gary Cuozzo – 12/20, 100 yards, 2 INT

**Top rushers**

- KC – Wendell Hayes – 7 rushes, 22 yards
- MIN – Bill Brown – 17 rushes, 55 yards

**Top receivers**

- KC – Otis Taylor – 5 receptions, 100 yards, TD
- MIN – John Beasley – 3 receptions, 41 yards

==== Week 2: at Baltimore Colts ====
Week 2: Kansas City Chiefs at Baltimore Colts – Game summary

Quarter	1	2	3	4	Total
**Chiefs**	10	21	3	10	**44**
Colts	0	7	3	14	**24**

at Memorial Stadium, Baltimore, Maryland

- Date: September 28
- Game time: 9:00 p.m. EDT
- Game weather: 61 °F (16 °C)
- Game attendance: 53,911
- Referee: Jim Tunney
- TV announcers (ABC): Keith Jackson, Don Meredith and Howard Cosell
- Recap

Game information

**First quarter**

- KC – Gloster Richardson 48-yard pass from Len Dawson (Jan Stenerud kick). Chiefs 7–0.
- KC – Jan Stenerud 28-yard field goal. Chiefs 10–0.

**Second quarter**

- KC – Robert Holmes 13-yard pass from Len Dawson (Jan Stenerud kick). Chiefs 17–0.
- KC – Johnny Robinson 46-yard fumble return (Jan Stenerud kick). Chiefs 24–0.
- KC – Frank Pitts 54-yard pass from Len Dawson (Jan Stenerud kick). Chiefs 31–0.
- BAL – Roy Jefferson 3-yard pass from Earl Morrall (Jim O'Brien kick). Chiefs 31–7.

**Third quarter**

- BAL – Jim O'Brien 26-yard field goal. Chiefs 31–10.
- KC – Jan Stenerud 17-yard field goal. Chiefs 34–10.

**Fourth quarter**

- KC – Frank Pitts 4-yard pass from Len Dawson (Jan Stenerud kick). Chiefs 41–10.
- BAL – Eddie Hinton 21-yard pass from Earl Morrall (Jim O'Brien kick). Chiefs 41–17.
- BAL – Tom Mitchell 2-yard pass from Earl Morrall (Jim O'Brien kick). Chiefs 41–24.
- KC – Jan Stenerud 48-yard field goal. Chiefs 44–24.

**Top passers**

- KC – Len Dawson – 9/12, 152 yards, 4 TD, INT
- BAL – Earl Morrall – 17/36, 243 yards, 3 TD, 3 INT

**Top rushers**

- KC – Warren McVea – 16 rushes, 56 yards
- BAL – Norm Bulaich – 15 rushes, 33 yards

**Top receivers**

- KC – Frank Pitts – 3 receptions, 62 yards, 2 TD
- BAL – Eddie Hinton – 11 receptions, 190 yards, TD

==== Week 3: at Denver Broncos ====
Week 3: Kansas City Chiefs at Denver Broncos – Game summary

Quarter	1	2	3	4	Total
Chiefs	0	3	10	0	**13**
**Broncos**	10	7	0	9	**26**

at Mile High Stadium, Denver, Colorado

- Date: October 4
- Game time: 2:00 p.m. MDT
- Game weather: 60 °F (16 °C)
- Game attendance: 50,705
- Referee: Norm Schachter
- TV announcers (NBC): Jay Randolph and Johnny Morris
- Recap

Game information

**First quarter**

- DEN – Bobby Howfield 12-yard field goal. Broncos 3–0.
- DEN – Willis Crenshaw 1-yard run (Bobby Howfield kick). Broncos 10–0.

**Second quarter**

- KC – Jan Stenerud 55-yard field goal. Broncos 10–3.
- DEN – Billy Masters 2-yard pass from Pete Liske (Bobby Howfield kick). Broncos 17–3.

**Third quarter**

- KC – Jan Stenerud 11-yard field goal. Broncos 17–6.
- KC – Wendell Hayes 1-yard run (Jan Stenerud kick). Broncos 17–13.

**Fourth quarter**

- DEN – Bobby Howfield 12-yard field goal. Broncos 20–13.
- DEN – Bobby Howfield 47-yard field goal. Broncos 23–13.
- DEN – Bobby Howfield 28-yard field goal. Broncos 26–13.

**Top passers**

- KC – Len Dawson – 10/26, 109 yards, 3 INT
- DEN – Pete Liske – 15/25, 135 yards, TD

**Top rushers**

- KC – Warren McVea – 8 rushes, 40 yards
- DEN – Floyd Little – 22 rushes, 75 yards

**Top receivers**

- KC – Ed Podolak – 3 receptions, 36 yards
- DEN – Jim Whalen – 5 receptions, 61 yards

==== Week 4: vs. Boston Patriots ====
Week 4: Boston Patriots at Kansas City Chiefs – Game summary

Quarter	1	2	3	4	Total
Patriots	3	0	0	7	**10**
**Chiefs**	0	10	0	13	**23**

at Municipal Stadium, Kansas City, Missouri

- Date: October 11
- Game time: 3:00 p.m. CDT
- Game weather: 57 °F (14 °C)
- Game attendance: 50,698
- Referee: Walt Fitzgerald
- TV announcers (NBC): Charlie Jones and Kyle Rote
- Recap

Game information

**First quarter**

- BOS – Gino Cappelletti 25-yard field goal. Patriots 3–0.

**Second quarter**

- KC – Robert Holmes 1-yard run (Jan Stenerud kick). Chiefs 7–3.
- KC – Jan Stenerud 42-yard field goal. Chiefs 10–3.

**Third quarter**

- No scoring plays.

**Fourth quarter**

- KC – Jan Stenerud 44-yard field goal. Chiefs 13–3.
- KC – Robert Holmes 1-yard run (Jan Stenerud kick). Chiefs 20–3.
- KC – Jan Stenerud 24-yard field goal. Chiefs 23–3.
- BOS – Bake Turner 12-yard pass from Joe Kapp (Jan Stenerud kick). Chiefs 23–10.

**Top passers**

- BOS – Mike Taliaferro – 3/12, 30 yards, 4 INT
- KC – Mike Livingston – 8/14, 85 yards, INT

**Top rushers**

- BOS – Carl Garrett – 10 rushes, 53 yards
- KC – Ed Podolak – 10 rushes, 81 yards

**Top receivers**

- BOS – Bake Turner – 2 receptions, 24 yards, TD
- KC – Robert Holmes – 2 receptions, 28 yards

==== Week 5: at Cincinnati Bengals ====
Week 5: Kansas City Chiefs at Cincinnati Bengals – Game summary

Quarter	1	2	3	4	Total
**Chiefs**	0	17	7	3	**27**
Bengals	3	6	0	10	**19**

at Riverfront Stadium, Cincinnati, Ohio

- Date: October 18
- Game time: 1:00 p.m. EDT
- Game weather: 45 °F (7 °C)
- Game attendance: 57,265
- Referee: Ben Dreith
- TV announcers (NBC): Charlie Jones and George Ratterman
- Recap

Game information

**First quarter**

- CIN – Horst Mühlmann 50-yard field goal. Bengals 3–0.

**Second quarter**

- CIN – Essex Johnson 5-yard run (kick failed). Bengals 9–0.
- KC – Jan Stenerud 40-yard field goal. Bengals 9–3.
- KC – Ed Podolak 59-yard pass from Len Dawson (Jan Stenerud kick). Chiefs 10–9.
- KC – Fred Arbanas 26-yard pass from Len Dawson (Jan Stenerud kick). Chiefs 17–9.

**Third quarter**

- KC – Wendell Hayes 2-yard run (Jan Stenerud kick). Chiefs 24–9.

**Fourth quarter**

- CIN – Horst Mühlmann 42-yard field goal. Chiefs 24–12.
- CIN – Bruce Coslet 7-yard pass from Virgil Carter (Horst Mühlmann kick). Chiefs 24–19.
- KC – Jan Stenerud 24-yard field goal. Chiefs 27–19.

**Top passers**

- KC – Len Dawson – 8/18, 174 yards, 2 TD
- CIN – Virgil Carter – 23/47, 180 yards, TD, INT

**Top rushers**

- KC – Ed Podolak – 16 rushes, 52 yards
- CIN – Jess Phillips – 12 rushes, 37 yards

**Top receivers**

- KC – Ed Podolak – 3 receptions, 78 yards, TD
- CIN – Chip Myers – 6 receptions, 68 yards

==== Week 6: vs. Dallas Cowboys ====
Week 6: Dallas Cowboys at Kansas City Chiefs – Game summary

Quarter	1	2	3	4	Total
**Cowboys**	3	10	14	0	**27**
Chiefs	7	3	0	6	**16**

at Municipal Stadium, Kansas City, Missouri

- Date: October 25
- Game time: 3:00 p.m. CST
- Game weather: 64 °F (18 °C)
- Game attendance: 51,158
- Referee: Pat Haggerty
- TV announcers (CBS): Ray Scott, Pat Summerall and Frank Clarke
- Box score

Game information

**First quarter**

- KC – Ed Podolak 5-yard run (Jan Stenerud kick). Chiefs 7–0.
- DAL – Mike Clark 38-yard field goal. Chiefs 7–3.

**Second quarter**

- DAL – Mike Clark 34-yard field goal. Chiefs 7–6.
- DAL – Duane Thomas 1-yard run (Mike Clark kick). Cowboys 13–7.
- KC – Jan Stenerud 33-yard field goal. Cowboys 13–10.

**Third quarter**

- DAL – Duane Thomas 47-yard run (Mike Clark kick). Cowboys 20–10.
- DAL – Bob Hayes 89-yard pass from Craig Morton (Mike Clark kick). Cowboys 27–10.

**Fourth quarter**

- KC – Jan Stenerud 32-yard field goal. Cowboys 27–13.
- KC – Jan Stenerud 22-yard field goal. Cowboys 27–16.

**Top passers**

- DAL – Craig Morton – 7/14, 160 yards, TD
- KC – Len Dawson – 17/38, 219 yards, 2 INT

**Top rushers**

- DAL – Duane Thomas – 20 rushes, 134 yards, 2 TD
- KC – Ed Podolak – 7 rushes, 18 yards, TD

**Top receivers**

- DAL – Bob Hayes – 2 receptions, 100 yards, TD
- KC – Ed Podolak – 2 receptions, 74 yards

==== Week 7: vs. Oakland Raiders ====
Week 7: Oakland Raiders at Kansas City Chiefs – Game summary

Quarter	1	2	3	4	Total
Raiders	0	7	7	3	**17**
Chiefs	0	7	3	7	**17**

at Municipal Stadium, Kansas City, Missouri

- Date: November 1
- Game time: 3:00 p.m. CST
- Game weather: 40 °F (4 °C)
- Game attendance: 51,334
- Referee: Bob Finley
- TV announcers (NBC): Curt Gowdy and Kyle Rote
- Box score

Game information

**First quarter**

- No scoring plays.

**Second quarter**

- KC – Wendell Hayes 4-yard run (Jan Stenerud kick). Chiefs 7–0.
- OAK – Raymond Chester 3-yard pass from Daryle Lamonica (George Blanda kick). Tie 7–7.

**Third quarter**

- OAK – Raymond Chester 8-yard pass from Daryle Lamonica (George Blanda kick). Raiders 14–7.
- KC – Jan Stenerud 33-yard field goal. Raiders 14–10.

**Fourth quarter**

- KC – Otis Taylor 13-yard pass from Len Dawson (Jan Stenerud kick). Chiefs 17–14.
- OAK – George Blanda 40-yard field goal. Tie 17–17.

**Top passers**

- OAK – Daryle Lamonica – 13/28, 125 yards, 2 TD
- KC – Len Dawson – 8/14, 174 yards, TD, INT

**Top rushers**

- OAK – Marv Hubbard – 18 rushes, 98 yards
- KC – Ed Podolak – 19 rushes, 108 yards

**Top receivers**

- OAK – Fred Biletnikoff – 2 receptions, 33 yards
- KC – Otis Taylor – 4 receptions, 129 yards, TD

==== Week 8: vs. Houston Oilers ====
Week 8: Houston Oilers at Kansas City Chiefs – Game summary

Quarter	1	2	3	4	Total
Oilers	3	3	3	0	**9**
**Chiefs**	7	7	0	10	**24**

at Municipal Stadium, Kansas City, Missouri

- Date: November 8
- Game time: 1:00 p.m. CST
- Game weather: 56 °F (13 °C)
- Game attendance: 49,810
- Referee: Bernie Ulman
- TV announcers (NBC): Bill Enis and George Ratterman
- Box score

Game information

**First quarter**

- HOU – Roy Gerela 38-yard field goal. Oilers 3–0.
- KC – Ed Podolak 8-yard run (Jan Stenerud kick). Chiefs 7–3.

**Second quarter**

- HOU – Roy Gerela 18-yard field goal. Chiefs 7–6.
- KC – Wendell Hayes 1-yard run (Jan Stenerud kick). Chiefs 14–6.

**Third quarter**

- HOU – Roy Gerela 48-yard field goal. Chiefs 14–9.

**Fourth quarter**

- KC – Bobby Bell 45-yard interception return (Jan Stenerud kick). Chiefs 21–9.
- KC – Jan Stenerud 39-yard field goal. Chiefs 24–9.

**Top passers**

- HOU – Charley Johnson – 20/42, 247 yards, 3 INT
- KC – Len Dawson – 4/13, 76 yards

**Top rushers**

- HOU – Mike Richardson – 10 rushes, 57 yards
- KC – Wendell Hayes – 14 rushes, 82 yards, TD

**Top receivers**

- HOU – Roy Hopkins – 6 receptions, 101 yards
- KC – Billy Cannon – 2 receptions, 55 yards

==== Week 9: at Pittsburgh Steelers ====
Week 9: Kansas City Chiefs at Pittsburgh Steelers – Game summary

Quarter	1	2	3	4	Total
**Chiefs**	3	7	7	14	**31**
Steelers	0	0	7	7	**14**

at Three Rivers Stadium, Pittsburgh, Pennsylvania

- Date: November 15
- Game time: 1:00 p.m. EST
- Game weather: 42 °F (6 °C)
- Game attendance: 50,081
- Referee: John McDonough
- TV announcers (NBC): Jim Simpson and Al DeRogatis
- Recap

Game information

**First quarter**

- KC – Jan Stenerud 32-yard field goal. Chiefs 3–0.

**Second quarter**

- KC – Billy Cannon 20-yard pass from Len Dawson (Jan Stenerud kick). Chiefs 10–0.

**Third quarter**

- PIT – John Fuqua 2-yard run (Gene Mingo kick). Chiefs 10–7.
- KC – Billy Cannon 20-yard pass from Len Dawson (Jan Stenerud kick). Chiefs 17–7.

**Fourth quarter**

- KC – Otis Taylor 42-yard pass from Len Dawson (Jan Stenerud kick). Chiefs 24–7.
- PIT – Jon Staggers 7-yard pass from Terry Bradshaw (Gene Mingo kick). Chiefs 24–14.
- KC – Robert Holmes (Jan Stenerud kick). Chiefs 31–14.

**Top passers**

- KC – Len Dawson – 19/24, 357 yards, 3 TD, INT
- PIT – Terry Bradshaw – 8/19, 74 yards, TD, 3 INT

**Top rushers**

- KC – Ed Podolak – 17 rushes, 42 yards
- PIT – Preston Pearson – 9 rushes, 45 yards

**Top receivers**

- KC – Otis Taylor – 5 receptions, 81 yards, TD
- PIT – Dave Smith – 4 receptions, 36 yards

==== Week 10: vs. St. Louis Cardinals ====
Week 10: St. Louis Cardinals at Kansas City Chiefs – Game summary

Quarter	1	2	3	4	Total
Cardinals	0	0	3	3	**6**
Chiefs	3	3	0	0	**6**

at Municipal Stadium, Kansas City, Missouri

- Date: November 22
- Game time: 3:00 p.m. CST
- Game weather: 42 °F (6 °C)
- Game attendance: 50,711
- Referee: Fred Swearingen
- TV announcers (CBS): Ray Scott, Pat Summerall and Bruce Roberts
- Box score

Game information

**First quarter**

- KC – Jan Stenerud 39-yard field goal. Chiefs 3–0.

**Second quarter**

- KC – Jan Stenerud 15-yard field goal. Chiefs 6–0.

**Third quarter**

- STL – Jim Bakken 49-yard field goal. Chiefs 6–3.

**Fourth quarter**

- STL – Jim Bakken 14-yard field goal. Tied 6–6.

**Top passers**

- STL – Jim Hart – 13/23, 119 yards, INT
- KC – Len Dawson – 4/14, 38 yards, 2 INT

**Top rushers**

- STL – Johnny Roland – 17 rushes, 89 yards
- KC – Ed Podolak – 23 rushes, 112 yards

**Top receivers**

- STL – Roy Shivers – 2 receptions, 33 yards
- KC – Otis Taylor – 2 receptions, 25 yards

==== Week 11: vs. San Diego Chargers ====
Week 11: San Diego Chargers at Kansas City Chiefs – Game summary

Quarter	1	2	3	4	Total
Chargers	7	0	0	7	**14**
**Chiefs**	10	3	7	6	**26**

at Municipal Stadium, Kansas City, Missouri

- Date: November 29
- Game time: 1:00 p.m. CST
- Game weather: 48 °F (9 °C)
- Game attendance: 50,315
- Referee: Jim Tunney
- TV announcers (NBC): Jim Simpson and Al DeRogatis
- Box score

Game information

**First quarter**

- KC – Morris Stroud 50-yard pass from Len Dawson (Jan Stenerud kick). Chiefs 7–0.
- SD – Dickie Post 1-yard run (Mike Mercer kick). Tied 7–7.
- KC – Jan Stenerud 43-yard field goal. Chiefs 10–7.

**Second quarter**

- KC – Jan Stenerud 39-yard field goal. Chiefs 13–7.

**Third quarter**

- KC – Wendell Hayes 1-yard run (Jan Stenerud kick). Chiefs 20–7.

**Fourth quarter**

- KC – Jan Stenerud 17-yard field goal. Chiefs 23–7.
- SD – Gary Garrison 28-yard pass from John Hadl (Mike Mercer kick). Chiefs 23–14.
- KC – Jan Stenerud 26-yard field goal. Chiefs 26–14.

**Top passers**

- SD – John Hadl – 15/26, 155 yards, TD, 2 INT
- KC – Len Dawson – 17/24, 208 yards, TD, INT

**Top rushers**

- SD – Dickie Post – 7 rushes, 13 yards, TD
- KC – Ed Podolak – 19 rushes, 52 yards

**Top receivers**

- SD – Dickie Post – 6 receptions, 53 yards
- KC – Morris Stroud – 1 reception, 50 yards, TD

==== Week 12: vs. Denver Broncos ====
Week 12: Denver Broncos at Kansas City Chiefs – Game summary

Quarter	1	2	3	4	Total
Broncos	0	0	0	0	**0**
**Chiefs**	10	0	3	3	**16**

at Municipal Stadium, Kansas City, Missouri

- Date: December 6
- Game time: 1:00 p.m. CST
- Game weather: 32 °F (0 °C)
- Game attendance: 50,454
- Referee: Jack Vest
- TV announcers (NBC): Ross Porter and Dave Kocourek
- Box score

Game information

**First quarter**

- KC – Ed Podolak 65-yard run (Jan Stenerud kick). Chiefs 7–0.
- KC – Jan Stenerud 35-yard field goal. Chiefs 10–0.

**Second quarter**

- No scoring plays.

**Third quarter**

- KC – Jan Stenerud 14-yard field goal. Chiefs 13–0.

**Fourth quarter**

- KC – Jan Stenerud 34-yard field goal. Chiefs 16–0.

**Top passers**

- DEN – Alan Pastrana – 9/21, 115 yards, 5 INT
- KC – Len Dawson – 7/19, 64 yards

**Top rushers**

- DEN – Floyd Little – 13 rushes, 60 yards
- KC – Ed Podolak – 12 rushes, 139 yards, TD

**Top receivers**

- DEN – Willis Crenshaw – 3 receptions, 42 yards
- KC – Otis Taylor – 2 receptions, 33 yards

==== Week 13: at Oakland Raiders ====
Week 13: Kansas City Chiefs at Oakland Raiders – Game summary

Quarter	1	2	3	4	Total
Chiefs	3	0	0	3	**6**
**Raiders**	0	6	7	7	**20**

at Oakland–Alameda County Coliseum, Oakland, California

- Date: December 12
- Game time: 1:00 p.m. PST
- Game weather: 50 °F (10 °C)
- Game attendance: 54,596
- Referee: Tommy Bell
- TV announcers (NBC): Curt Gowdy and Kyle Rote
- Recap

Game information

**First quarter**

- KC – Jan Stenerud 20-yard field goal. Chiefs 3–0.

**Second quarter**

- OAK – George Blanda 23-yard field goal. Tied 3–3.
- OAK – George Blanda 35-yard field goal. Raiders 6–3.

**Third quarter**

- OAK – Marv Hubbard 6-yard run (George Blanda kick). Raiders 13–3.

**Fourth quarter**

- OAK – Fred Biletnikoff 36-yard pass from Daryle Lamonica (George Blanda kick). Raiders 20–3.
- KC – Jan Stenerud 40-yard field goal. Raiders 20–6.

**Top passers**

- KC – Len Dawson – 6/12, 80 yards, INT
- OAK – Daryle Lamonica – 9/19, 136 yards, TD, INT

**Top rushers**

- KC – Wendell Hayes – 9 rushes, 25 yards
- OAK – Marv Hubbard – 16 rushes, 93 yards, TD

**Top receivers**

- KC – Otis Taylor – 3 receptions, 59 yards
- OAK – Fred Biletnikoff – 3 receptions, 80 yards, TD

==== Week 14: at San Diego Chargers ====
Week 14: Kansas City Chiefs at San Diego Chargers – Game summary

Quarter	1	2	3	4	Total
Chiefs	0	10	3	0	**13**
**Chargers**	3	14	7	7	**31**

at San Diego Stadium, San Diego, California

- Date: December 20
- Game time: 1:00 p.m. PST
- Game weather: 54 °F (12 °C)
- Game attendance: 41,379
- Referee: Norm Schachter
- TV announcers (NBC): Jay Randolph and Gordy Soltau
- Recap

Game information

**First quarter**

- SD – Mike Mercer 27-yard field goal. Chargers 3–0.

**Second quarter**

- SD – Willie Frazier 5-yard pass from John Hadl (Mike Mercer kick). Chargers 10–0.
- KC – Gloster Richardson 61-yard pass from Len Dawson (Jan Stenerud kick). Chargers 10–7.
- SD – Mike Garrett 5-yard run (Mike Mercer kick). Chargers 17–7.
- KC – Jan Stenerud 37-yard field goal. Chargers 17–10.

**Third quarter**

- KC – Jan Stenerud 10-yard field goal. Chargers 17–13.
- SD – Willie Frazier 3-yard pass from John Hadl (Mike Mercer kick). Chargers 24–13.

**Fourth quarter**

- SD – Mike Garrett 44-yard pass from John Hadl (Mike Mercer kick). Chargers 31–13.

**Top passers**

- KC – Len Dawson – 14/21, 161 yards, TD
- SD – John Hadl – 16/27, 277 yards, 3 TD

**Top rushers**

- KC – Ed Podolak – 14 rushes, 56 yards
- SD – Mike Garrett – 10 rushes, 60 yards, TD

**Top receivers**

- KC – Gloster Richardson – 1 reception, 61 yards, TD
- SD – Gary Garrison – 5 receptions, 149 yards

== Standings ==
AFC West
	W	L	T	PCT	DIV	CONF	PF	PA	STK
Oakland Raiders	8	4	2	.667	4–0–2	7–2–2	300	293	L1
Kansas City Chiefs	7	5	2	.583	2–3–1	7–3–1	272	244	L2
San Diego Chargers	5	6	3	.455	2–2–2	4–4–3	282	278	W1
Denver Broncos	5	8	1	.385	1–4–1	3–6–1	253	264	L1

Note: Tie games were not officially counted in the standings until 1972.
