= 1970 Buffalo Bills season =

11th season in franchise history, first in the National Football League

- Owner: Ralph Wilson
- Head coach: John Rauch
- Home stadium: War Memorial Stadium

Results
- Record: 3–10–1
- Division place: 4th AFC East
- Playoffs: Did not qualify
- Pro Bowlers: WR Marlin Briscoe

The 1970 Buffalo Bills season was the franchise's first season in the National Football League, and eleventh overall. The team looked to improve on its 4–10 record from 1969 and make the playoffs for the first time since 1966. However, the Bills started out on the wrong foot, losing four of their first five games. After winning two consecutive road games against the Patriots and Jets and suffering a blowout loss to the Cincinnati Bengals, the Bills and Colts played to a 17–17 draw in week 9, Buffalo's first tie since 1968. The Bills would then lose five straight to end the season and finished 3–10–1, for fourth place in the AFC East. Their Week 5 game against the Miami Dolphins would start an era of futility during which the Bills would lose twenty consecutive games against the Dolphins. The Bills would not defeat the Dolphins at any point during the 1970s and next beat Miami in 1980. This would become known as "The Streak".

This would also mark the final season for Bills punter and linebacker Paul Maguire, as he retired after the season to go into broadcasting.

== Offseason ==
=== NFL draft ===
1970 Buffalo Bills draft
Round	Pick	Player	Position	College	Notes
1	5	Al Cowlings	Defensive tackle	USC	
2	30	Dennis Shaw	Quarterback	San Diego State	
3	57	Jim Reilly	Guard	Notre Dame	
3	67	Glenn Alexander	Cornerback	Grambling	
4	82	Jerome Gantt	Defensive end	North Carolina Central	
5	109	Steve Starnes	Linebacker	Tampa	
6	134	Ken Edwards	Running back	Virginia Tech	
6	135	Grant Guthrie	Kicker	Florida State	
7	161	Wayne Fowler	Offensive tackle	Richmond	
8	186	Richard Cheek	Offensive tackle	Auburn	
9	213	Bill Bridges	Guard	Houston	
10	238	Willie Dixon	Defensive back	Albany State	
11	265	Terry Williams	Running back	Grambling	
12	290	Dave Simpson	Offensive tackle	Drake	
13	317	Steve Schroeder	Kicker	Pacific	
14	342	William Costen	Offensive tackle	Morris Brown	
15	369	Dave Farris	Tight end	Central Michigan	
16	394	Larry Davis	Wide receiver	Rice	
17	421	George Bevan	Defensive back	LSU	
Made roster

=== Undrafted free agents ===
1970 undrafted free agents of note
Player	Position	College
Al Andrews	Linebacker	New Mexico State
Frank Blackwell, Jr	Wide receiver	Memphis State
Bill Crone	Tackle	Loyola of Los Angeles
Don DeSalle	Guard	Indiana
Fran Foreman	Tackle	Cincinnati
Jim Gill	Guard	McNeese State
Jack Morrison	Wide receiver	Pacific
Doug Watkins	Running back	Fisk

== Personnel ==
=== Coaches/Staff ===
1970 Buffalo Bills staff
Front office: President – Ralph Wilson; Vice President and General Manager – Bob Lustig; Vice President/Minority Owner – Pat McGroder; Coaching staff: Head Coach - John Rauch; Offensive coaches: Offensive Line – Marvin Bass & Chuck Gottfried; Defensive coaches': Defensive Line – Ray Malavsi; Linebackers – Ralph Hawkins; Defensive Backfield – Bobby Hunt; Kickers - Bugsy Engelberg

- Source: https://pro-football-history.com/franchise/7/buffalo-bills-coaches

=== Final roster ===
1970 Buffalo Bills roster
Quarterbacks (QB): 10 Dan Darragh; 12 James Harris; 16 Dennis Shaw; Running backs (RB): 41 Bill Enyart; 40 Roland Moss; 33 Lloyd Pate; Wide receivers (WR): 45 Glenn Alexander; 86 Marlin Briscoe; 26 Clyde Glosson; 25 Haven Moses; Tight ends (TE): 84 Austin Denney; 85 Willie Grate	Offensive linemen (OL): 74 Levert Carr T; 73 Richard Cheek G; 79 Paul Costa T; 53 Wayne Fowler C; 69 Jerome Gantt T; 54 Howard Kindig T; 75 Art Laster T; 57 Frank Marchlewski C; 67 Joe O'Donnell G; 61 Jim Reilly G; Defensive linemen (DL): 82 Al Cowlings DE; 78 Jim Dunaway DT; 65 Waddey Harvey DT; 76 Mike McBath DE; 72 Ron McDole DE; 88 Julian Nunamaker DT	Linebackers (LB): 56 Al Andrews OLB; 52 Edgar Chandler MLB; 51 Jerald Collins OLB; 63 Dick Cunningham MLB; 59 Paul Guidry OLB; 64 Mike McCaffrey OLB; Defensive backs (DB): 21 Jackie Allen FS; 42 Butch Byrd CB; 28 Ike Hill CB; 20 Robert James CB; 27 Tommy Pharr SS; 48 John Pitts SS; 47 Pete Richardson FS; Special teams (ST): 7 Grant Guthrie K; 55 Paul Maguire P	Reserve: 22 Max Anderson RB (IR); 36 Greg Jones RB (IR); 30 Wayne Patrick RB (IR); 32 O. J. Simpson RB (IR); 58 Mike Stratton LB (IR); 71 Bob Tatarek DT (IR); Rookies in italics

== Regular season ==
=== Schedule ===
Week	Date	Opponent	Result	Record	Venue	Attendance
1	September 20	Denver Broncos	**L** 10–25	0–1	War Memorial Stadium	34,882
2	September 27	Los Angeles Rams	**L** 0–19	0–2	War Memorial Stadium	46,206
3	October 4	**New York Jets**	**W** 34–31	1–2	War Memorial Stadium	46,206
4	October 11	at Pittsburgh Steelers	**L** 10–23	1–3	Three Rivers Stadium	42,140
5	October 18	**Miami Dolphins**	**L** 14–33	1–4	War Memorial Stadium	41,312
6	October 25	at **New York Jets**	**W** 10–6	2–4	Shea Stadium	62,712
7	November 1	at **Boston Patriots**	**W** 45–10	3–4	Harvard Stadium	31,148
8	November 8	Cincinnati Bengals	**L** 14–43	3–5	War Memorial Stadium	43,587
9	November 15	at **Baltimore Colts**	**T** 17–17	3–5–1	Memorial Stadium	60,240
10	November 22	at Chicago Bears	**L** 13–31	3–6–1	Wrigley Field	41,015
11	November 29	**Boston Patriots**	**L** 10–14	3–7–1	War Memorial Stadium	31,427
12	December 6	at New York Giants	**L** 6–20	3–8–1	Yankee Stadium	62,870
13	December 13	**Baltimore Colts**	**L** 14–20	3–9–1	War Memorial Stadium	34,346
14	December 20	at **Miami Dolphins**	**L** 7–45	3–10–1	Miami Orange Bowl	70,990
Note: Intra-division opponents are in **bold** text.

=== Season summary ===
==== Week 1 ====
Team	1	2	3	4	Total
• Broncos	0	5	7	13	25
Bills	7	3	0	0	10

- Date: September 20
- Location: War Memorial Stadium

==== Week 2 ====
Team	1	2	3	4	Total
• Rams	3	13	0	3	19
Bills	0	0	0	0	0

- Date: September 27
- Location: War Memorial Stadium

==== Week 3 ====
Team	1	2	3	4	Total
Jets	17	7	7	0	31
• Bills	7	6	7	14	34

- Date: October 4
- Location: War Memorial Stadium

==== Week 4 ====
Team	1	2	3	4	Total
Bills	3	0	7	0	10
• Steelers	3	7	3	10	23

- Date: October 11
- Location: Three Rivers Stadium

==== Week 5 ====
Team	1	2	3	4	Total
• Dolphins	10	3	7	13	33
Bills	0	7	7	0	14

- Date: October 18
- Location: War Memorial Stadium

==== Week 6 ====
Team	1	2	3	4	Total
• Bills	0	3	0	7	10
Jets	0	0	6	0	6

- Date: October 25
- Location: Shea Stadium

==== Week 7 ====
Team	1	2	3	4	Total
• Bills	10	21	0	14	45
Patriots	0	0	3	7	10

- Date: November 1
- Location: Harvard Stadium

==== Week 8 ====
Team	1	2	3	4	Total
• Bengals	3	20	13	7	43
Bills	7	7	0	0	14

- Date: November 8
- Location: War Memorial Stadium

==== Week 9 ====
Team	1	2	3	4	Total
Bills	7	7	0	3	17
Colts	0	7	7	3	17

- Date: November 15
- Location: Memorial Stadium

==== Week 10 ====
Team	1	2	3	4	Total
Bills	6	0	0	7	13
• Bears	0	14	7	10	31

- Date: November 22
- Location: Wrigley Field

==== Week 11 ====
Team	1	2	3	4	Total
• Patriots	0	7	7	0	14
Bills	0	3	0	7	10

- Date: November 29
- Location: War Memorial Stadium

==== Week 12 ====
Team	1	2	3	4	Total
Bills	0	6	0	0	6
• Giants	0	3	3	14	20

- Date: December 6
- Location: Yankee Stadium

==== Week 13 ====
Team	1	2	3	4	Total
• Colts	10	0	7	3	20
Bills	7	7	0	0	14

- Date: December 13
- Location: War Memorial Stadium

==== Week 14 ====
Team	1	2	3	4	Total
Bills	0	0	0	7	7
• Dolphins	21	10	7	7	45

- Date: December 20
- Location: Orange Bowl

=== Standings ===
AFC East
	W	L	T	PCT	DIV	CONF	PF	PA	STK
Baltimore Colts	11	2	1	.846	6–1–1	8–2–1	321	234	W4
Miami Dolphins	10	4	0	.714	6–2	8–3	297	228	W6
New York Jets	4	10	0	.286	2–6	2–9	255	286	L3
Buffalo Bills	3	10	1	.231	3–4–1	3–7–1	204	337	L5
Boston Patriots	2	12	0	.143	2–6	2–9	149	361	L3

Note: Tie games were not officially counted in the standings until 1972.
