= Rusty Ganas =

American football player (born 1949)

No. 69
- Position: Defensive tackle

Personal information
- Born: August 12, 1949 (age 77); Waycross, Georgia, U.S.
- Listed height: 6 ft 4 in (1.93 m)
- Listed weight: 257 lb (117 kg)

Career information
- High school: Ware County (Waycross)
- College: South Carolina (1967–1970)
- NFL draft: 1971: undrafted

Career history
- Baltimore Colts (1971); Minnesota Vikings (1973)*; Philadelphia Bell (1974)*
- * Offseason or practice squad member only
- Stats at Pro Football Reference

Russell Lindberg Ganas (born August 12, 1949) is an American former professional football player who was a defensive tackle for one season with the Baltimore Colts of the National Football League (NFL). He played college football for the South Carolina Gamecocks.

== Early life and college ==
Russell Lindberg Ganas was born on August 12, 1949, in Waycross, Georgia. He attended Ware County High School in Waycross, lettering in football, basketball, baseball, and track. He was inducted into the Waycross-Ware County Sports Hall of Fame in 1991.

Ganas was a member of the South Carolina Gamecocks of the University of South Carolina from 1967 to 1970. He was a three-year letterman and three-year starter from 1968 to 1970.

== Professional career ==
After going undrafted in the 1971 NFL draft, Ganas signed with the Baltimore Colts, who were coming off a Super Bowl-winning season. He played in one game for the Colts during the 1971 season. He also spent time on the team's taxi squad that season. Ganas was cut by the Colts on August 26, 1972.

Ganas signed with the Minnesota Vikings in 1973. He was cut on August 6, 1973.

Ganas was signed by the Philadelphia Bell of the upstart World Football League in 1974. He left the team voluntarily on June 9, 1974.

== Coaching career ==
Ganas began his teaching and coaching career as an assistant varsity football and baseball coach at Bacon County High School. He became the defensive coordinator and head baseball coach at Coffee High School in 1974. He quit baseball in 1977 to became Coffee's head girls' basketball coach. Ganas became the defensive coordinator and head baseball coach at Waycross High School in 1979. He helped Waycross win the football state title in 1981. In 1986, Ganas was named the head football coach and athletic director at his alma mater, Ware County High School. He lost the head coaching job in 1993 when Ware County High and Waycross merged but stayed on as Ware County's athletic director until 2008.
