= Bugsy Engelberg =

American football coach and executive (1946–1987)

Personal information
- Born: April 19, 1946; Waycross, Georgia, U.S.
- Died: July 29, 1987 (aged 41); Oviedo, Florida, U.S.

Career information
- High school: Waycross (Waycross, Georgia)
- College: East Tennessee (1965)

Career history

Coaching
- Florida State (1967) Student assistant; Oakland Raiders (1968) Kicking coach; Buffalo Bills (1969–1970) Kicking coach

Operations
- Jacksonville Sharks (1974) Director of player personnel; Tampa Bay Bandits (1983–1984) Director of football operations; Orlando Renegades (1985) General manager

Lewis "Bugsy" Engelberg (April 19, 1946 – July 29, 1987) was an American football coach and executive who was the general manager of the Orlando Renegades of the United States Football League during their only season (1985).

== Biography ==
Engelberg was born in Waycross, Georgia on April 19, 1946. He played guard for the East Tennessee State Buccaneers football team until a knee injury ended his playing career. He then transferred to Florida State University, where he was a student assistant for the Seminoles. Specializing in kicking, he helped develop Grant Guthrie.

In 1968, Engelberg was the kicking coach for the Oakland Raiders. At 22, he was the league's youngest coach and his kicker, George Blanda, was the league's oldest player. That season, Blanda broke the American Football League single season record for field goals. He followed Raiders coach John Rauch to the Buffalo Bills and spent two seasons (1969 and 1970) as their kicking coach. In 1973, he worked with the kickers of the Rauch-coached Toronto Argonauts during training camp.

In 1974, Engelberg moved to the front office as director of player personnel for the Jacksonville Sharks of the World Football League. After the league folded, he moved to Orlando, Florida and started American Recovery Service, a commercial collection agency. He returned to football in 1982 as acting director of player personnel for the Tampa Bay Bandits of the United States Football League. He was responsible for assembling the team's roster and convincing owner John F. Bassett to hire head coach Steve Spurrier. In 1984, he became the general manager of the Orlando Renegades, a position he held until the league folded.

After the USFL folded, Engelberg remained involved in sports as a booster for University of Central Florida athletics. The school's head football coach, Gene McDowell, was a childhood friend and high school teammate of Engelberg. On July 29, 1987, Engelberg was found dead in his car in McDowell's garage from apparent carbon monoxide poisoning. His death was ruled a suicide.
