= Wayne Fowler =

American football player (born 1948)

No. 53
- Position: Offensive lineman

Personal information
- Born: January 23, 1948 (age 78); Baltimore, Maryland, U.S.
- Listed height: 6 ft 3 in (1.91 m)
- Listed weight: 260 lb (118 kg)

Career information
- High school: Glen Burnie (MD)
- College: Richmond
- NFL draft: 1970: 7th round, 161st overall pick

Career history
- Buffalo Bills (1970–1971); Green Bay Packers (1971)

Career NFL statistics
- Games played: 10
- Stats at Pro Football Reference

Byron Wayne Fowler (born January 23, 1948) is an American former professional football player who was an offensive lineman for the Buffalo Bills of the National Football League (NFL). He also signed with the Green Bay Packers but did not play in any games for them. He played college football for the Richmond Spiders.
