= Odell Lawson =

American football player (1948–2008)

No. 32, 39
- Position: Running back

Personal information
- Born: December 20, 1948; Ponca City, Oklahoma, U.S.
- Died: February 14, 2008 (aged 59); New Orleans, Louisiana, U.S.
- Listed height: 6 ft 2 in (1.88 m)
- Listed weight: 218 lb (99 kg)

Career information
- High school: Ponca City
- College: Langston
- NFL draft: 1970: 7th round, 160th overall pick

Career history
- Boston/New England Patriots (1970–1971); San Francisco 49ers (1973)*; New Orleans Saints (1973–1974)
- * Offseason or practice squad member only

Career NFL statistics
- Rushing attempts: 70
- Rushing yards: 130
- Receptions: 13
- Receiving yards: 108
- Stats at Pro Football Reference

Odell Lawson (December 20, 1948 — February 14, 2008) was an American professional football player who was a running back in the National Football League (NFL). He played college football for the Langston Lions.

== Early life ==
Lawson was born and grew up in Ponca City, Oklahoma and attended Ponca City High School. He was named All-State as a senior in 1965.

== College career ==
Lawson was named All-Oklahoma Collegiate Conference as a sophomore and as a senior. He rushed for over 2,000 yards in his collegiate career.

== Professional career ==
Lawson was selected by the Boston Patriots in the seventh round of the 1970 NFL Draft. He was named the Patriot's rookie of the year after rushing for 99 yards on 56 carries, gaining 113 yards on 11 receptions, and returning 25 kickoffs for 546 yards. Lawson suffered a season-ending injury two games into the 1971 season. He was cut by the Patriots at the end of training camp in 1972.

Lawson was signed by the San Francisco 49ers during the 1973 offseason, but was waived at the end of training camp. He was claimed off waivers by the New Orleans Saints and spent the next two seasons with the team.
