= Clive Rush =

American football player and coach (1931–1980)

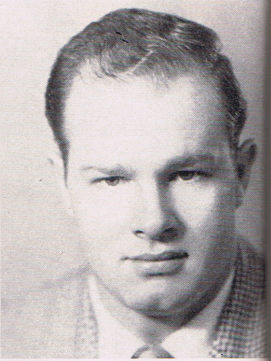
- Rush, c. 1958

Biographical details
- Born: February 14, 1931; De Graff, Ohio, U.S.
- Died: August 22, 1980 (aged 49); London, Ohio, U.S.

Playing career
- 1950–1952: Miami (OH)
- 1953: Green Bay Packers
- Position: End

Coaching career (HC unless noted)
- 1954: Dayton (ends)
- 1955–1957: Ohio State (backfield)
- 1958: Oklahoma (backfield)
- 1959: Ohio State (backfield)
- 1960–1962: Toledo
- 1963–1968: New York Jets (OC)
- 1969–1970: Boston Patriots
- 1976: Merchant Marine

Head coaching record
- Overall: 16–21 (college); 5–21 (professional)

Clive Harold Rush (February 14, 1931 – August 22, 1980) was an American football player and coach at both the professional and collegiate levels. He served as the head coach at the University of Toledo from 1960 to 1962. Rush was the head coach of the Boston Patriots during the 1969 American Football League (AFL) season and the 1970 National Football League (NFL) season.

== Career ==
Rush played college football at Miami University, then competed for one season in the National Football League (NFL) with the Green Bay Packers in 1953. From there, Rush received a strong coaching education, with collegiate stints at the University of Dayton (under Hugh Devore), Ohio State University (under Woody Hayes), and the University of Oklahoma (under Bud Wilkinson). In 1960, he accepted the head coaching position at the University of Toledo, but left after three losing seasons.

Rush then became an assistant with the New York Jets of the American Football League in 1963, serving as the main architect of the team's high-powered offense that was later led by Joe Namath. As offensive coordinator, he reached the high point of his career when he mapped the Jets' game plan as they upset the heavily favored Baltimore Colts in Super Bowl III on January 12, 1969. That success resulted in his hiring by the Patriots 18 days later. Another finalist for the job was Colts secondary coach Chuck Noll, who was hired a few days later by the Pittsburgh Steelers.

His tenure with the Patriots was marked by constant conflict with players, owners, league officials and the media. One bizarre indication of Rush's luck came on February 12, 1969, when he introduced the team's new general manager, George Sauer, Sr. While grabbing the microphone, Rush received a five-second electrical shock that left him briefly stunned.

During his 21 games as Patriots' head coach, they won only five. During Boston's sixth straight loss of the 1970 season, a 45–10 defeat to the Buffalo Bills on the first of November, Rush began to suffer an irregular heartbeat and briefly left the stadium. Two days later, he resigned as head coach and said he would never coach again.

However, several months later in March 1971, he was hired by George Allen, who had recently taken the helm of the Washington Redskins. Just six weeks later, Rush abruptly resigned and was out of football for the next five years.

Rush resurfaced as the head coach at the United States Merchant Marine Academy in 1976. While he led the Mariners to an 8–1 record, complaints from players resulted in his firing after less than one season; he did not coach the final two games.

Never coaching again, Rush ran a car dealership in Springfield, Ohio. He suffered a sudden heart attack at his home in nearby London and later died at a local hospital. At the time of his death, Rush was a regional director for Grolier Education Corporation.

== Head coaching record ==
=== College ===
Year	Team	Overall	Conference	Standing
Toledo Rockets (Mid-American Conference) (1960–1962)
1960	Toledo	2–7	0–6	7th
1961	Toledo	3–7	2–4	5th
1962	Toledo	3–6	1–5	6th
Toledo:		8–20	3–15	
Merchant Marine Mariners (Metropolitan Intercollegiate Conference) (1976)
1976	Merchant Marine	8–1*	4–1	2nd
Merchant Marine:		8–1	4–1	* Rush did not coach the final two games but is credited with both wins.
Total:		16–21		

== See also ==
- List of American Football League players
