= Glenn Alexander =

American football player (born 1947)

No. 45
- Position: Wide receiver

Personal information
- Born: June 3, 1947 (age 79); New Orleans, Louisiana, U.S.
- Listed height: 6 ft 3 in (1.91 m)
- Listed weight: 205 lb (93 kg)

Career information
- High school: St. Augustine
- College: Grambling
- NFL draft: 1970: 3rd round, 67th overall pick

Career history
- Buffalo Bills (1970); New England Patriots (1971)*
- * Offseason or practice squad member only

Career NFL statistics
- Games played: 13
- Receptions: 4
- Receiving yards: 51
- Stats at Pro Football Reference

Glenn Elliott Alexander (born June 3, 1947) is an American former professional football player who was a wide receiver in the National Football League (NFL). He played college football for the Grambling Tigers.

Alexander was a cornerback and a return specialist at Grambling before he was selected 67th overall by the Buffalo Bills in the third round of the 1970 NFL draft. After signing with the Bills in July, he played in 13 games for Buffalo in 1970, with four receptions, 12 kick returns, and one punt return. In August 1971, he was placed on waivers and released. By the end of the month, Alexander was signed by the New England Patriots. He was released in September 1971.
