= Richard Cheek =

American football player (born 1948)

No. 73
- Position: Guard

Personal information
- Born: January 19, 1948 (age 78); Panama City, Florida, U.S.
- Listed height: 6 ft 3 in (1.91 m)
- Listed weight: 266 lb (121 kg)

Career information
- High school: Bay (Panama City)
- College: Auburn
- NFL draft: 1970: 8th round, 186th overall pick

Career history
- Buffalo Bills (1970)

Awards and highlights
- Second-team All-SEC (1969)

Career NFL statistics
- Games played: 14
- Stats at Pro Football Reference

Richard Cheek (born January 19, 1948) is an American former professional football player who was a guard for the Buffalo Bills of the National Football League (NFL) in 1970. He played college football for the Auburn Tigers.
