= Jim Reilly (American football) =

American football player (1948–1994)

No. 61
- Position: Guard

Personal information
- Born: February 8, 1948; Yonkers, New York, U.S.
- Died: August 3, 1994 (aged 46); Greenburgh, New York, U.S.
- Listed height: 6 ft 2 in (1.88 m)
- Listed weight: 260 lb (118 kg)

Career information
- High school: Hackley School (Tarrytown, New York)
- College: Notre Dame
- NFL draft: 1970: 3rd round, 57th overall pick

Career history
- Buffalo Bills (1970–1971)

Awards and highlights
- First-team All-American (1969)

Career NFL statistics
- Games played: 27
- Stats at Pro Football Reference

James Christopher Reilly (February 8, 1948 – August 3, 1994) was an American professional football player who was a guard for two seasons with the Buffalo Bills of the National Football League (NFL). He played college football for the Notre Dame Fighting Irish, earning first-team All-American honors in 1969.

Reilly died at age 46 in 1994 and his high school, Hackley, posthumously retired his number.
