= Bob Hews =

American football player (born 1947)

No. 72
- Position: Offensive tackle / Defensive end

Personal information
- Born: December 30, 1947 (age 78); Portland, Maine, U.S.
- Listed height: 6 ft 5 in (1.96 m)
- Listed weight: 240 lb (109 kg)

Career information
- High school: South Portland (South Portland, Maine)
- College: Princeton (1966–1969)
- NFL draft: 1970: 6th round, 156th overall pick

Career history
- Kansas City Chiefs (1970)*; Buffalo Bills (1971)
- * Offseason or practice squad member only

Awards and highlights
- Second-team All-East (1969)
- Stats at Pro Football Reference

Robert Ellsworth Hews (born December 30, 1947) is an American former professional football player who played one season with the Buffalo Bills of the National Football League (NFL). He played college football at Princeton and was selected by the Kansas City Chiefs in the sixth round of the 1970 NFL draft.

== Early life ==
Robert Ellsworth Hews was born on December 30, 1947, in Portland, Maine. He attended South Portland High School in South Portland High School. He graduated in 1966. Hews also participated in basketball and track in high school. He won the state title in the discus throw and also earned all-league honors in basketball.

== College career ==
Hews was a member of the Princeton Tigers of Princeton University from 1966 to 1969 as a defensive lineman. He was a three-year letterman from 1967 to 1969. He was named second-team All-East by the Associated Press in 1969.

== Professional career ==
Hews was selected by the Kansas City Chiefs in the sixth round, with the 156th overall pick, of the 1970 NFL draft. He signed with the Chiefs on June 24, 1970. He was later waived and then signed to the team's taxi squad on September 17, 1970, where he spent the entire 1970 season. He became a free agent after the season and re-signed with the Chiefs. Hews was waived on September 7, 1971.

Hews then signed with the Buffalo Bills before being waived on September 15, 1971. He was signed to the Bills' practice squad on September 20, 1971. He was later promoted to the active roster and played in two games for the Bills during the 1971 season. He was listed as an offensive tackle/defensive end during his time with the Bills.

== Post-NFL career ==
After his release from the Bills, he served as a substitute teacher for English and math classes at his alma mater, South Portland High School. He then had a tryout with the Montreal Alouettes of the Canadian Football League in 1972 but left the team. He then joined the family business, now known as Hews Company LLC, and later became its president. As of 2024, the Portland Press Herald reported that Hews Company LLC was "one of the largest builders of truck bodies and distributors of truck equipment in northern New England".

== Personal life ==
Hews' brother Charlie played college football at Bowdoin College and had a preseason stint with the Dallas Cowboys. Another brother Jim, played football at East Texas State University.
