= Claude Hipps =

American football player (1927–2017)

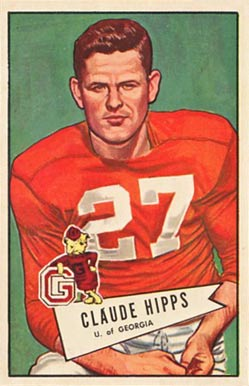
- Hipps on a 1952 Bowman football card

No. 24
- Position: Defensive back

Personal information
- Born: April 23, 1927; Hazlehurst, Georgia, U.S.
- Died: May 20, 2017 (aged 90); West Melbourne, Florida, U.S.
- Listed height: 6 ft 1 in (1.85 m)
- Listed weight: 189 lb (86 kg)

Career information
- High school: Waycross (GA)
- College: Georgia
- NFL draft: 1952: 7th round, 78th overall pick

Career history
- Pittsburgh Steelers (1952–1953)

Awards and highlights
- First-team All-SEC (1951)

Career NFL statistics
- Interceptions: 5
- Stats at Pro Football Reference

Claude Marion Hipps (April 23, 1927 – May 20, 2017) was an American professional football defensive back who played two seasons with the Pittsburgh Steelers of the National Football League (NFL). He was selected by the Steelers in the seventh round of the 1952 NFL draft after playing college football at the University of Georgia.

== Early life and college ==
Claude Marion Hipps was born on April 23, 1927, in Hazlehurst, Georgia. He attended Waycross High School in Waycross, Georgia. He was inducted into the Ware County Sports Hall of Fame in 1986.

He lettered for the Georgia Bulldogs in 1944. His college career was interrupted by a stint in the United States Marine Corps. While in the military, he played football for the Atlantic Fleet All Star teams and was the MVP of the China Bowl. He returned to college in 1949 and lettered for the Bulldogs from 1949 to 1951. Hipps was named first-team All-SEC by the Associated Press his senior year in 1951. He graduated with a degree in business.

== Professional career ==
Hipps was selected by the Pittsburgh Steelers in the seventh round, with the 78th overall pick, of the 1952 NFL draft. He played in 12 games, starting nine, for the Steelers during the 1952 season, recording three interceptions. He appeared in five games, starting four, during the 1953 season and made two interceptions. He spent part of the season on injured reserve. Hipps became a free agent in May 1954.

== Personal life ==
Hipps died in 2017 at the age of 90 in West Melbourne, Florida.
