= Bob Liggett =

American football player (born 1946)

No. 62
- Position: Defensive tackle

Personal information
- Born: December 8, 1946 (age 79); Aliquippa, Pennsylvania, U.S.
- Listed height: 6 ft 2 in (1.88 m)
- Listed weight: 255 lb (116 kg)

Career information
- High school: Aliquippa
- College: Nebraska
- NFL draft: 1970: 15th round, 390th overall pick

Career history
- Kansas City Chiefs (1970); BC Lions (1971)
- Stats at Pro Football Reference

Bob Liggett (born December 8, 1946) is an American former professional football player who was a defensive tackle in the National Football League (NFL) and Canadian Football League (CFL). After playing college football for the Nebraska Cornhuskers, he played in the NFL for the Kansas City Chiefs in 1970 and for the CFL's BC Lions in 1971.
