= David Hadley (American football) =

American football player (1948-2024)

No. 23
- Position: Cornerback

Personal information
- Born: October 8, 1948; Amory, Mississippi, U.S.
- Died: August 19, 2024 (aged 75); Amory, Mississippi, U.S.
- Listed height: 5 ft 9 in (1.75 m)
- Listed weight: 186 lb (84 kg)

Career information
- High school: West Amory High School (MS)
- College: Alcorn State
- NFL draft: 1970: 3rd round, 78th overall pick

Career history
- Kansas City Chiefs (1970–1971)

Career NFL statistics
- Games played: 28
- Stats at Pro Football Reference

David Hadley (born October 8, 1948 – August 19, 2024) was an American professional football cornerback. He played for the Kansas City Chiefs from 1970 to 1971 and for the Edmonton Eskimos in 1972.
