= Grant Guthrie =

American football player (born 1948)

No. 7
- Position: Placekicker

Personal information
- Born: February 9, 1948 (age 78); Waynesboro, Pennsylvania, U.S.
- Listed height: 6 ft 0 in (1.83 m)
- Listed weight: 210 lb (95 kg)

Career information
- High school: Claymont (DE)
- College: Florida State
- NFL draft: 1970: 6th round, 135th overall pick

Career history
- Buffalo Bills (1970–1971); Jacksonville Sharks (1974); Birmingham Americans (1974)

Career NFL statistics
- Games played: 20
- Stats at Pro Football Reference

Grant Morrow Guthrie (born February 9, 1948) is an American former professional football player who was a placekicker for the Buffalo Bills of the National Football League (NFL) from 1970 to 1971. He played college football for the Florida State Seminoles.

He was inducted into the Delaware Sports Hall of Fame in 1987.
