= 1970 New York Jets season =

1970 season of NFL team New York Jets

- Owner: Leon Hess
- Head coach: Weeb Ewbank
- Home stadium: Shea Stadium

Results
- Record: 4–10
- Division place: 3rd AFC East
- Playoffs: Did not qualify

The 1970 New York Jets season was the 11th season for the team and the first in the National Football League, following the AFL–NFL merger. It began with the team trying to maintain or improve upon its 10–4 record from 1969 under head coach Weeb Ewbank. The Jets finished with a record of 4–10. One of the highlights of the season was the Jets' first game when they appeared on the first ever Monday Night Football game vs. the Cleveland Browns. The Jets lost the game 31–21. In the fifth game of the season, quarterback Joe Namath was lost for the season when he broke his wrist vs. the Baltimore Colts in Shea Stadium, the first meeting between the teams since Namath guaranteed victory in Super Bowl III. Namath's injury occurred when he hit his hand on the helmet of Colts defensive tackle Fred Miller. With Namath on the sidelines, the Jets were forced to play untested Al Woodall, who guided New York to upsets of NFC powerhouses Los Angeles and Minnesota, but only one other victory, over the lowly Boston Patriots.

== Offseason ==
=== Draft ===
1970 New York Jets draft
Round	Pick	Player	Position	College	Notes
1	20	Steve Tannen	Cornerback	Florida	
2	46	Rich Caster *	Wide receiver	Jackson State	
3	72	Dennis Onkotz	Linebacker	Penn State	
4	98	John Ebersole	Linebacker	Penn State	
5	108	Cliff McClain	Running back	South Carolina State	
5	124	Gary Arthur	Tight end	Miami (OH)	
6	150	Terry Stewart	Defensive back	Arkansas	
7	176	James Williams	Defensive back	Virginia State	
8	187	Jack Porter	Guard	Oklahoma	
8	202	Mark Lomas	Defensive end	Northern Arizona	
9	228	Eddie Bell	Wide receiver	Idaho State	
10	254	Cleve Dickerson	Running back	Miami (OH)	
11	280	Earlie Thomas	Cornerback	Colorado State	
Made roster * Made at least one Pro Bowl during career

=== Undrafted free agents ===
1970 undrafted free agents of note
Player	Position	College
Pete Johnson	Tight end/Linebacker	Penn State
Tom Weidl	Kicker	Brockport State

== Roster ==
1970 New York Jets roster
Quarterbacks (QB): 15 Bob Davis; 18 Al Woodall; Running backs (RB): 32 Emerson Boozer; 42 Cliff McClain; 30 Chuck Mercein; 37 George Nock; 34 Lee White; Wide receivers (WR): 7 Eddie Bell; 88 Rich Caster; 13 Don Maynard; 83 George Sauer; Tight ends (TE): 82 Gary Arthur; 87 Pete Lammons	Offensive linemen (OL): 70 Dave Foley T; 67 Dave Herman G; 75 Winston Hill T; 68 Dave Middendorf G; 64 Pete Perreault T; 66 Randy Rasmussen G; 52 John Schmitt C; Defensive linemen (DL): 86 Verlon Biggs DE; 80 John Elliott DT; 57 John Little DE; 84 Mark Lomas DE/DT; 81 Gerry Philbin DE; 85 Steve Thompson DT	Linebackers (LB): 62 Al Atkinson MLB; 51 Ralph Baker OLB; 56 Paul Crane OLB; 55 John Ebersole MLB; 60 Larry Grantham OLB; Defensive backs (DB): 40 Mike Battle FS; 43 John Dockery CB; 33 W. K. Hicks FS; 48 Gus Hollomon SS; 28 Cecil Leonard CB; 21 Steve Tannen CB; 45 Earlie Thomas CB; Special teams (ST): 20 Steve O'Neal P; 11 Jim Turner K	Practice squad: 77 Tom Bayless G; 22 Jim Hudson S; 26 Frank Quayle RB; 23 James Williams CB; Reserve: 61 Roger Finnie T (IR); 65 Jimmie Jones DE (IR); 12 Joe Namath QB (IR); 35 Dennis Onkotz LB (IR); 41 Matt Snell RB (IR); 89 Wayne Stewart TE (IR); Rookies in italics

== Schedule ==
Week	Date	Opponent	Result	Record	Venue	Attendance	Recap
1	September 21	at Cleveland Browns	**L** 21–31	0–1	Cleveland Stadium	85,703	Recap
2	September 27	at **Boston Patriots**	**W** 31–21	1–1	Harvard Stadium	36,040	Recap
3	October 4	at **Buffalo Bills**	**L** 31–34	1–2	War Memorial Stadium	46,206	Recap
4	October 10	**Miami Dolphins**	**L** 6–20	1–3	Shea Stadium	62,712	Recap
5	October 18	**Baltimore Colts**	**L** 22–29	1–4	Shea Stadium	63,301	Recap
6	October 25	**Buffalo Bills**	**L** 6–10	1–5	Shea Stadium	62,712	Recap
7	November 1	New York Giants	**L** 10–22	1–6	Shea Stadium	63,903	Recap
8	November 8	at Pittsburgh Steelers	**L** 17–21	1–7	Three Rivers Stadium	50,028	Recap
9	November 15	at Los Angeles Rams	**W** 31–20	2–7	Los Angeles Memorial Coliseum	76,378	Recap
10	November 22	**Boston Patriots**	**W** 17–3	3–7	Shea Stadium	61,822	Recap
11	November 29	Minnesota Vikings	**W** 20–10	4–7	Shea Stadium	62,333	Recap
12	December 6	Oakland Raiders	**L** 13–14	4–8	Shea Stadium	62,905	Recap
13	December 13	at **Miami Dolphins**	**L** 10–16	4–9	Miami Orange Bowl	75,099	Recap
14	December 19	at **Baltimore Colts**	**L** 20–35	4–10	Memorial Stadium	60,240	Recap
Note: Intra-division opponents are in **bold** text.

== Standings ==
AFC East
	W	L	T	PCT	DIV	CONF	PF	PA	STK
Baltimore Colts	11	2	1	.846	6–1–1	8–2–1	321	234	W4
Miami Dolphins	10	4	0	.714	6–2	8–3	297	228	W6
New York Jets	4	10	0	.286	2–6	2–9	255	286	L3
Buffalo Bills	3	10	1	.231	3–4–1	3–7–1	204	337	L5
Boston Patriots	2	12	0	.143	2–6	2–9	149	361	L3

Note: Tie games were not officially counted in the standings until 1972.
