= Aaron Marsh (American football) =

American football player (1945–2026)

No. 29
- Positions: Flanker, cornerback

Personal information
- Born: July 27, 1945; Dayton, Ohio, U.S.
- Died: August 7, 2026 (aged 81); Shelbyville, Tennessee, U.S.
- Listed height: 6 ft 1 in (1.85 m)
- Listed weight: 190 lb (86 kg)

Career information
- High school: Springfield (Springfield, Ohio)
- College: Eastern Kentucky
- AFL draft: 1968: 3rd round, 60th overall pick

Career history
- Boston Patriots (1968–1970); Denver Broncos (1971)*
- * Offseason or practice squad member only

Awards and highlights
- Second-team Little All-American (1967)
- Stats at Pro Football Reference

Aaron Washington Marsh (July 27, 1945 – August 7, 2026) was an American professional football player for the Boston Patriots of the American Football League (AFL). He played college football for the Eastern Kentucky Colonels and was selected by the Patriots in the third round of the 1968 NFL/AFL draft.

== Early life ==
Aaron Washington Marsh was born in Dayton, Ohio, on July 27, 1945. He attended Springfield High School in Springfield, Ohio.

== College career ==
Marsh enrolled at Eastern Kentucky State College, where he was one of the first African-American student-athletes at the school. He played college football for the Colonels from 1964 to 1967, spending his first two years as a tailback and his final two as a wide receiver. He earned All-Ohio Valley Conference honors in 1966 and 1967. As a senior in 1967, Marsh was named a second-team Little All-American by the Associated Press. He helped Eastern Kentucky win the 1967 Grantland Rice Bowl. He finished his college career with 147 receptions for 2,246 yards and 24 touchdowns. In 2009, Marsh was named to the Eastern Kentucky All-Century Football Team. At the time of the announcement, he still held the school's single-game receptions records with 19, single-game receiving yards record with 316, single-season receptions record with 73, and single-season punt return yards record with 456.

== Professional career ==
Marsh selected by the Boston Patriots in the third round, with the 60th overall pick, of the 1968 NFL/AFL draft. He played in all 14 games, starting 12, for the Patriots in 1968, catching 19 passes for 331 yards and four touchdowns, rushing four times for eight yards, and returning four kicks for 74 yards. The Patriots finished the season with a 4–10 record. Marsh was named the team's rookie of the year. He appeared in all 14 games for the second straight season, starting four, in 1969, totaling eight receptions for 108 yards and six kick returns for 136 yards. After having trouble with drops, Marsh was moved to cornerback midway through the 1969 season. He made his impressive debut at cornerback on November 2, 1969, against the Houston Oilers, and posted four solo tackles. He was placed on injured waivers on August 26, 1970, and then reverted to injured reserve after clearing waivers.

In May 1971, Marsh signed with the Denver Broncos. On August 24, 1971, it was reported that he had been waived.

== Personal life ==
After his playing career, Marsh founded a little league for inner-city kids in Compton, California. He later became a mentor with Big Brothers Big Sisters of America. Marsh died on August 7, 2026, in Shelbyville, Tennessee, at the age of 81.
