= Clyde Glosson =

American football player (born 1947)

No. 26
- Position: Wide receiver

Personal information
- Born: January 22, 1947 (age 79); San Antonio, Texas, U.S.
- Listed height: 5 ft 11 in (1.80 m)
- Listed weight: 175 lb (79 kg)

Career information
- High school: Wheatley (TX)
- College: UTEP; Trinity
- NFL draft: 1970: 7th round, 182nd overall pick

Career history
- Kansas City Chiefs (1970)*; Buffalo Bills (1970)
- * Offseason or practice squad member only
- Stats at Pro Football Reference

Clyde Pearson Glosson (born January 22, 1947) is an American former professional football player who was a wide receiver for the Buffalo Bills of the National Football League (NFL) in 1970. He played college football for the UTEP Miners and Trinity Tigers.

Glosson also competed for the UTEP Miners track and field and Trinity Tigers track and field teams as a 400 meters runner. He split a 440 yards relay anchor leg in 39.4 seconds and was a relay alternate for the United States at the 1968 Summer Olympics.
