= Jerome Gantt =

American gridiron football player (born 1948)

Profile
- Position: Tackle

Personal information
- Born: October 20, 1948 (age 78); Greensboro, North Carolina, U.S.
- Listed height: 6 ft 4 in (1.93 m)
- Listed weight: 266 lb (121 kg)

Career information
- High school: James B. Dudley (Greensboro)
- College: North Carolina Central

Career history
- 1970: Buffalo Bills (NFL)
- 1972–1973: Hamilton Tiger-Cats (CFL)
- 1974: Saskatchewan Roughriders (CFL)
- 1974: Hamilton Tiger-Cats (CFL)
- 1974: Montreal Alouettes (CFL)
- 1975: Charlotte Hornets (WFL)

Awards and highlights
- 2× Grey Cup champion (1972, 1974)
- Stats at Pro Football Reference

Jerome Floyd Gantt (born October 20, 1948) is an American former professional football offensive tackle and Grey Cup champion. He played in the National Football League (NFL) and Canadian Football League (CFL).

Gantt played college football at North Carolina Central University and was chosen in the fourth round (80th overall) of the 1970 NFL draft by the NFL's Buffalo Bills, where he played six games as a back-up. In 1972, he moved to Canada with the Hamilton Tiger-Cats and won the Grey Cup with them that year. In 1974, he played for the Saskatchewan Roughriders. He also joined the Montreal Alouettes of the CFL and was part of their 1974 Grey Cup winning team. He finished his career in 1975 with the Charlotte Hornets of the World Football League (WFL).
