= Kent Schoolfield =

American football player and coach (born 1946)

Biographical details
- Born: September 3, 1946; Columbus, Ohio, U.S.

Playing career
- 1965–1969: Florida A&M
- Position: Wide receiver

Coaching career (HC unless noted)
- 1976–1980: Florida State (WR)
- 1981: North Carolina A&T (WR)
- 1982: New Mexico State (WR)
- 1983–1984: Pittsburgh (WR)
- 1989–1992: Florida A&M (OC)
- 1993–1994: Temple (RB)
- 1995–1996: James Madison (OC)
- 1997–2002: Fort Valley State
- 2004: North Carolina A&T (OC)

Head coaching record
- Overall: 48–21
- Tournaments: 1–3 (NCAA D-II playoffs)

Accomplishments and honors

Championships
- 2 SIAC (1999, 2001)

Kent Schoolfield (born September 3, 1946) is an American former college football player and coach. A wide receiver at Florida A&M University in Tallahassee, he was selected by the New England Patriots in the 1970 NFL draft. Schoolfield served as the head football coach at Fort Valley State University in Fort Valley, Georgia from 1997 to 2002, compiling a record of 48–21.

== Head coaching record ==
Year	Team	Overall	Conference	Standing	Bowl/playoffs	AFCA^{#}
Fort Valley State Wildcats (Southern Intercollegiate Athletic Conference) (1997–2002)
1997	Fort Valley State	5–6	4–2	T–2nd		
1998	Fort Valley State	11–2	5–1	T–2nd	L NCAA Division II Quarterfinal	12
1999	Fort Valley State	10–2	5–1	T–1st	L NCAA Division II First Round	6
2000	Fort Valley State	7–4	5–2	T–2nd		
2001	Fort Valley State	8–3	6–1	T–1st	L NCAA Division II First Round	21
2002	Fort Valley State	7–4	6–2	T–2nd		
Fort Valley State:		48–21	31–9			
Total:		48–21				
National championship Conference title Conference division title or championship game berth
