= Jim Cheyunski =

American football player (born 1945)

- Cheyunski in 1977

No. 50, 59
- Position: Linebacker

Personal information
- Born: December 29, 1945 (age 80); Bridgewater, Massachusetts, U.S.
- Listed height: 6 ft 1 in (1.85 m)
- Listed weight: 225 lb (102 kg)

Career information
- High school: West Bridgewater (West Bridgewater, Massachusetts)
- College: Syracuse
- NFL draft: 1968: 12th round, 305th overall pick

Career history
- Boston / New England Patriots (1968–1972); Buffalo Bills (1973–1974); Baltimore Colts (1975–1976)

Career NFL/AFL statistics
- Fumble recoveries: 9
- Interceptions: 9
- Sacks: 5
- Stats at Pro Football Reference

James Michael “Jim” Cheyunski (/tʃeɪˈjʌnskiː/ chay-YUN-skee; born December 29, 1945) is an American former professional football player who was a linebacker in the National Football League (NFL) for the Boston/New England Patriots, Buffalo Bills, and Baltimore Colts. He played college football for the Syracuse Orange. He is of Lithuanian descent.

== Early life ==
Cheyunski was born on December 25, 1945, in West Bridgewater, Massachusetts. His father Adolph “Ace” Cheyunski owned a gas station in Bridgewater. They were of Lithuanian descent. Cheyunski attended West Bridgewater High School, graduating in 1963. He played three sports, including running back on the school's football team. He was captain of the football, baseball and basketball teams. He met his future wife Pat Barros while in high school.

In 2015, he was inducted into the inaugural class of the West Bridgewater High School Athletic Hall of Fame.

== College career ==
Cheyunski received a football scholarship to attend Syracuse University, where he played linebacker on the school's football team. He originally played running back as a freshman, but was switched to linebacker. He first became a starting linebacker on the team during his sophomore season (1964). He was a starting linebacker in 1965, and filled in at defensive end for an injured teammate. He was demoted as a starter one game that season, but came back with his best game of the year the next week at starting middle linebacker.

He missed playing time in 1966 due to mononucleosis. Late in the season he was still recovering from mononucleosis and was not able to play in the Gator Bowl match between Syracuse and the University of Tennessee.

He was the team co-captain in 1967 as a senior, and the defensive signal-caller. College Football Hall of Fame Syracuse head coach Ben Schwarzwalder said Cheyunski "was an exceptionally good defensive captain for us . . . and he had a real sense of knowing where every play was heading". He had three interceptions in 1967, including a 25-yard touchdown return against Boston College that was critical to Syracuse's victory in that game. Cheyunski led Syracuse two consecutive seasons in tackles. In 1967, Syracuse was second in the nation in rushing defense (giving up 193 yards in 10 games) and fourth in total defense.

In 1967, the Associated Press (AP) named Cheyunski to its All-East second team.

His Syracuse teammates included future Hall of Fame running backs Larry Csonka and Floyd Little, as well as future NFL coach Tom Coughlin.

== Professional career ==
=== Boston/New England Patriots ===
The Boston Patriots selected Cheyunski in the 12th round of the 1968 NFL/AFL draft, 305th overall. He first came to the Patriots attention years earlier when Rommie Loudd, later the Patriots director of player personnel, spotted the powerfully built Cheyunski working as a gas station attendant for his father in Bridgewater.

In 1968, Cheyunski began his rookie season as the backup middle linebacker to future Hall of Fame middle linebacker Nick Buoniconti; playing mostly on special teams. He started five games for the injured Buoniconti at the end of the 1968 season, with one interception and one quarterback sack. In his first three games as a starter in 1968, he had 12, 16 and 17 tackles respectively. Cheyunski had reduced his weight to 205 lb (93 kg) before the season, anticipating this would make him faster on special teams. After the 1968 season, Cheyunski used a weight-lifting program to build up from 200 lb (90.7 kg) to 225 lb (102.1 kg). The Patriots traded Buoniconti before the 1969 season, and Cheyunski became the starting middle linebacker. He started all 14 games in 1969, with one interception, three fumble recoveries and 1.5 quarterback sacks.

He was named the AFL Defensive Player of the Week for a November 16, 1969 game against the Cincinnati Bengals. In that game he intercepted a pass, recovered a fumble, helped block a punt with lineman Ray Jacobs, had six solo tackles and six assisted tackles. He also received the game ball from his teammates.

He started 11 games in 1970 and 14 in 1971. In 1970, he suffered a knee injury in the first half of an early December game against the Buffalo Bills, and was replaced by linebacker (and future NFL coach) Marty Schottenheimer. Cheyunski had surgery shortly thereafter to repair ligament damage in his right knee, and could not play in the season's final three games. In 1971, the Boston Patriots changed their name to the New England Patriots when they began playing at a new stadium in Foxboro, Massachusetts, only 10 miles from West Bridgewater where Cheyunski was raised.

In 1972, he broke a bone in his right hand during training camp, exacerbated that injury in the last preseason game, and wore a series of casts on it during the season. Doctors had recommended surgery, but he wanted to play. He started 11 of the 14 games he played in 1972. His original cast made it impossible to intercept a pass and difficult to tackle. He found a substitute cast of straps and steel, which would allow him more flexibility. The Patriots considered this new cast unsafe for him to play in, and only allowed him to play using that cast after signing a waiver of liability against the team. He also wore a large knee brace during the season.

The Patriots had weak offensive teams during Cheyunski's playing years with them (1968 to 1972), going 19–51. In 1969, the Patriots ran the second fewest offensive plays of any AFL team (729), one more than the Cincinnati Bengals. In 1970 they ran the fewest plays among all 26 NFL teams; and were 24th in 1971 and 14th in 1972. Because of the offense's deficiencies, the Patriots' defense was on the field a significant amount of time during games. This caused wear and tear on Cheyunski’s body, manifesting in a number of knee injuries and surgeries. He had three knee surgeries across three seasons, but only missed four games in five years with the Patriots.

=== Buffalo Bills ===
In April 1973, Cheyunski was traded along with Halvor Hagen and Mike Montler to the Buffalo Bills for Wayne Patrick, Edgar Chandler and Jeff Lyman. The Bills originally waived him in early September because of a sprained left knee, but brought him back. He started 12 games at middle linebacker with three interceptions and one fumble recovery. Cheyunski became the Bills co-captain with O. J. Simpson in 1973. During an October 29 Monday Night Football game against the Kansas City Chiefs, Cheyunski recovered a Len Dawson fumble and later intercepted a Dawson pass, ultimately setting up two touchdown runs by Simpson. After years of playing for losing teams, the 1973 Bills were 9–5 and finished second in the AFC East Division.

The Bills were 9–5 again in 1974, with another second place finish. Cheyunski started all 14 games, with one interception, one fumble recovery and one sack. He started in his first playoff game, a loss to the Pittsburgh Steelers, who would go on to win Super Bowl IX.

=== Baltimore Colts ===
In 1974, the Baltimore Colts had a 2–12 record. In July 1975, the Colts acquired Cheyunski in a trade with the Bills for a sixth round draft choice. He began the 1975 season as the backup to Pro Bowl and All-Pro middle linebacker Mike Curtis. Curtis suffered an eye injury and only started five games that season, with the Colts record at 1–4.

Cheyunski became the Colts' starting middle linebacker for the rest of the season. He was responsible for making the line calls on the Colts defense. The Colts won their next nine consecutive games, finishing the season 10–4 and making the playoffs. Legendary head coach Bill Belichick was then a young assistant with the Colts, and has said Cheyunski played a key role in the Colts turnaround. Colts' defensive tackle Joe Ehrmann called Cheyunski the heart of the Colts defense that season.

By the time he joined the Colts, Cheyunski’s back and knees were in poor condition. He wore a knee brace on his right leg, and played on only one good leg that season, without getting the full medical treatment his knees required. Yet, he did not miss a game with the Colts that season. Belichick observed that after every game Cheyunski’s knees would blow up like balloons and he could barely walk. His condition got progressively worse each week, and Belichick would wonder after each game whether Cheyunski would be able to play the next week. But Cheyunski would recover by game day and play well.

During the Baltimore Colts’ 1975 nine game winning streak Cheyunski helped secure wins over the Miami Dolphins with a fumble recovery; against the Kansas City Chiefs with a finger-tip interception at the goal line; and over the New York Giants with an interception at the Colts’ six yard line. In the Kansas City game, he was in man-to-man coverage when he intercepted future Hall of Fame quarterback Len Dawson's pass to wide receiver Barry Pearson.

The 1975 Colts lost to the eventual Super Bowl X champion Pittsburgh Steelers in the first round of the playoffs. Cheyunkski had ½ sack in that game. He started all 14 games at middle linebacker for the Baltimore Colts in 1976. The team went 11–3, and finished in first place in the AFC East Division. The Colts lost again to the Pittsburgh Steelers in the first round of the playoffs. Cheyunski was the starting middle linebacker in what was the last game of his career.

He suffered a cracked vertebra in his back while with the Colts and regularly suffered left leg pain thereafter. As a result of concussions he would be in games calling defensive signals while being out on his feet. Before the 1977 season Colts’ coach Ted Marchibroda told Cheyunski if he continued to play he would destroy his body. The Colts waived him at the end of August 1977. He signed with the Green Bay Packers as a free agent in November 1977, but was waived less than three weeks later; and never played for the Packers.

== Legacy ==
Over his career, Cheyunski would consistently lead his team in tackles. When Cheyunski was traded from Boston in April 1973, National Sports Media Association Hall of Fame Boston sportswriter and author Leigh Montville praised Cheyunski as a “blue-collar middle linebacker”; even keeled and hardworking without the flamboyance of others playing the position. He described Cheyunski as a professional who showed up for all but four games over five years on a losing team; even when injuries wore him down, seriously damaged his knees and gave him an excuse not to play.

Cheyunski considered himself undersized and emotionally understated in the locker room compared to most middle linebackers. Through pre-game film study, he came into games prepared and able to anticipate where offensive plays were going, and so could get a head start against opposing offensive plays. Though prayerful before games, he described himself as playing “like a maniac” in games.

National Sports Media Association Hall of Fame Baltimore sportswriter John Steadman said of Cheyunski during the 1975 Colts' winning streak, "Cheyunski is an unselfish individual who gives 100 per cent of himself. His attitude proves again that you can be an outstanding football player and not growl like an animal, snarl at your teammates or take cheap shots at the opposition". Steadman also described him as "quietly religious". Teammate Lydell Mitchell said in 1975, "There's a real man . . . He's hurting more than you can believe, but he's there doing the job". Baltimore Colts' linebacker coach Maxie Baughan said "He's all heart. The guys want him in there. He's a leader. This is a young team and they look to him".

After joining the Colts, in his first game back in Buffalo to play against the Bills, the Buffalo fans gave him a standing ovation when he came out for the pre-game coin toss.

== Personal life ==
During his college and early AFL years he worked with violent patients as a psychiatric aide at the Bridgewater State Hospital for the Criminally Insane. The hospital became the subject of a 1967 documentary film, Titicut Follies.

After professional football, Cheyunski served as athletic director at Episcopal High School in Jacksonville, Florida. He was also a defensive coordinator for Sarasota High School's championship teams (1985 to 1990), head coach at Providence Day School in Charlotte, North Carolina, and head coach at University Christian School, another high school in Jacksonville. His son Adam played middle linebacker at Sarasota. Cheyunski later moved to Seaford, Delaware and worked for a home builder. He subsequently moved to Raleigh, North Carolina. At age 71, he taught his teenage grandson Connor Cheyunski, a linebacker on his high school team, how to study film so he could learn to anticipate plays.

During the police pursuit of O.J. Simpson in June 1994, in a car driven by Al Cowlings, Cheyunski was one of those who pleaded with them to stop.

He suffered from a severe six-month long depression in the late 1990s. He believed it was the result of concussions suffered during his playing days. Cheyunski said "Only through the Grace of God, my family and my work ethic did I get through it". He also had knee replacement and spinal fusion surgeries.
