= Waycross High School =

Defunct high school in Georgia, United States

Information
- School type: High school
- Established: 1936
- Closed: 1994
- Yearbook: Turpicone

Waycross High School was a high school in the city of Waycross, Georgia, United States. In 1993, the Waycross School Board dissolved its charter and was absorbed by the Ware County School System. As a result, Ware County was able to keep a large grant it had been promised, with which to build a much bigger Ware County Senior High school.

The school was located on Ava Street, at the present site of the Central Baptist Church.

The Ava Street Waycross Senior High was started in 1936. It graduated its first class in 1939 and its last in 1966. At the midterm of the 1966 school year, the new Waycross High School was completed and moved into during Christmas break. Thus 1967 was the first year at the new Waycross High School, which later became a middle school. In 1993 the Waycross School System was absorbed by the Ware County School system. Waycross graduated its last class in 1994.

Waycross won the Georgia State AA football championship in 1960, 1961, and 1977. In 1981 they won the Georgia State Class AAA football title.

Waycross High was also built into a track and field powerhouse under the leadership of Coach Chuck McKenny. The Bulldogs won the AA State Championship in 1970, AAA State Runner-Up in 1971, and the AAA State Championship in 1972.

The yearbook was named the Turpicone (turpentine-pine cone; Ware County was the largest producer of naval stores in the world).

== Alma Mater ==
The school's alma mater reflects themes of school pride, remembrance, loyalty, and attachment to Waycross High School. Its lyrics refer to the school's location and express the enduring connection of former students to their alma mater.

Refrain:
Hail, all hail! our Alma Mater! We will honor thee;
Hail to thee, our Alma Mater; Loyal we will be.

== Football ==
- State titles: 4 - 1960 (AA), 1961 (AA), 1977 (AA), 1981 (AAA)
- Region titles: 7 - 1960, 1961, 1977, 1981, 1984, 1985, 1989

Waycross High's biggest rivalry was with cross-county school Ware County High. Quite possibly the greatest game played between the two, in the 1977 State Championship season's final regular season game, #1 Ware County and #2 Waycross faced off at Memorial Stadium. The only score of the game was a second quarter FG by Waycross' Ricky Chaney. Waycross upset the #1 team 3-0, and went on to defeat Ware County yet again the very next week, 28-7, in the Region Championship game. Waycross won four state football titles.

== Notable alumni ==
- Jay Gogue (class of 1965) - president of Auburn University
- Claude Hipps - NFL player
- Caroline Pafford Miller (class of 1921) - Pulitzer Prize-winning author of Lamb in His Bosom (1934)
- Pernell Roberts - actor (Bonanza, Trapper John, M.D.)
