= Tom Funchess =

American football player (born 1944)

No. 73, 66, 70
- Position: Offensive tackle

Personal information
- Born: September 12, 1944 (age 82); Crystal Springs, Mississippi, U.S.
- Listed height: 6 ft 5 in (1.96 m)
- Listed weight: 265 lb (120 kg)

Career information
- High school: Crystal Springs
- College: Jackson State (1964-1967)
- NFL draft: 1968: 2nd round, 32nd overall pick

Career history
- Boston Patriots (1968–1970); Houston Oilers (1971–1973); Miami Dolphins (1974)

Career NFL/AFL statistics
- Games played: 87
- Games started: 72
- Fumble recoveries: 1
- Stats at Pro Football Reference

Tom Funchess (born September 12, 1944) is an American former professional football player who was an offensive tackle in the National Football League (NFL). He was selected by the Boston Patriots in the second round of the 1968 NFL/AFL draft. He played college football for the Jackson State Tigers. Funchess also played for the Houston Oilers and Miami Dolphins.
