= R. C. Gamble =

American football player (born 1946)

No. 13
- Position: Running back

Personal information
- Born: September 27, 1946 (age 80); Griffin, Georgia, U.S.
- Listed height: 6 ft 3 in (1.91 m)
- Listed weight: 220 lb (100 kg)

Career information
- High school: Sterling (Greenville, South Carolina)
- College: South Carolina State
- NFL draft: 1968: 4th round, 88th overall pick

Career history
- Boston Patriots (1968-1969)

Career AFL statistics
- Rushing yards: 346
- Rushing average: 3.7
- Receptions: 18
- Receiving yards: 129
- Total touchdowns: 2
- Stats at Pro Football Reference

R.C. Gamble Jr. (born September 27, 1946) is an American former professional football player who was a running back in the American Football League (AFL) for the Boston Patriots. He played college football for the South Carolina State Bulldogs. He also played in the Canadian Football League (CFL) for the Saskatchewan Roughriders and Edmonton Eskimos.
