= Mel Witt =

American football player (born 1945)

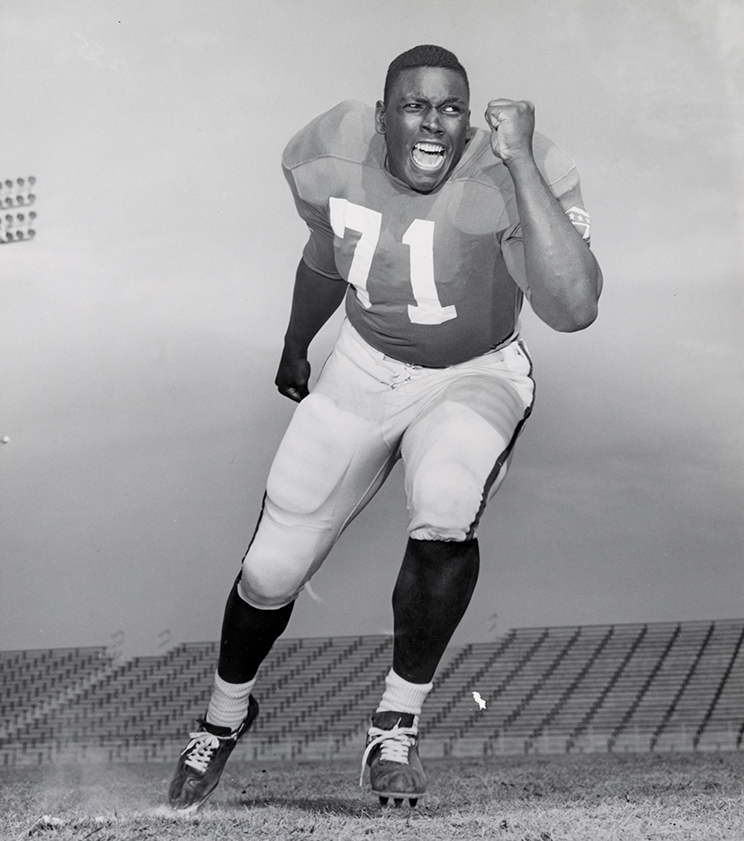
- Witt at Arlington State, 1966

No. 70, 71
- Positions: Defensive end, defensive back

Personal information
- Born: November 23, 1945 (age 80); Fort Worth, Texas, U.S.
- Died: February 11, 2013; Maui, Hawaii, U.S.
- Listed height: 6 ft 3 in (1.91 m)
- Listed weight: 250 lb (113 kg)

Career information
- High school: Dunbar (Fort Worth, TX)
- College: Arlington State
- NFL draft: 1967: 5th round, 128th overall pick

Career history
- Boston Patriots (1967–1970)

Career NFL statistics
- Games: 35
- Games started: 13
- Stats at Pro Football Reference

Hillery Melvin Witt (1945–2013) was an American professional football defensive end and defensive tackle.

Witt was born in Fort Worth, Texas, in 1945. He attended Dunbar High School in Fort Worth and played college football at Arlington State (now known as Texas–Arlington) from 1964 to 1966. He was the first African-American athlete in Arlington State's history.

Witt played professionally in the American Football League (AFL) and National Football League (NFL) for the Boston Patriots (1967–1970). He appeared in 35 games for the Patriots, 13 as a starter.
