= Daryl Johnson =

American football player (1946–2023)

No. 23
- Position: Cornerback

Personal information
- Born: August 11, 1946; Richmond, Virginia, U.S.
- Died: November 25, 2023 (aged 77); Haverhill, Massachusetts, U.S.
- Listed height: 5 ft 11 in (1.80 m)
- Listed weight: 190 lb (86 kg)

Career information
- High school: Maggie L. Walker (Richmond)
- College: Morgan State
- NFL draft: 1968: 8th round, 197th overall pick

Career history
- Boston Patriots (1968-1970)

Career NFL/AFL statistics
- Interceptions: 5
- Fumble recoveries: 2
- Touchdowns: 1
- Sacks: 1
- Stats at Pro Football Reference

Daryl E. Johnson (August 11, 1946 – November 25, 2023) was an American professional football defensive back who played in the American Football League (AFL), the National Football League (NFL), and the World Football League (WFL). He was a member of the Boston Patriots and was a member of the Patriots 1960s All-Decade Team.

== College career ==
Johnson graduated from Maggie L. Walker High School in Richmond. He entered Morgan State University in 1964 and received his Bachelor of Science in Business Administration degree. Johnson (5'10½"/170 lbs), was an invited walk-on at Morgan State, where he became a four-year letterman in football playing on three undefeated CIAA Championship football teams from 1965–1967, and was a two-year letterman in track and field.

Johnson acquired many honors during his amazing college football career: however, he carved his own piece of Morgan State athletic history as the starting quarterback during the undefeated 1966 and 1967 CIAA Championship football seasons. In 1966, Morgan State University became the first predominantly African American team selected to play in the NCAA sanctioned Tangerine Bowl (now called the Citrus Bowl). Johnson led the Morgan State Golden Bears on one of the biggest stages the University had been on to a historic 14-6 victory over West Chester State (PA). The victory earned Morgan State University the distinction of being crowned the first historically black college or university (HBCU) to win a nationally recognized NCAA Championship Title, Atlantic Coast Champions. Johnson ended the 1966 season being selected to the first-team Maryland All-State Team as a placekicker and first-team ALL-CIAA.

During the 1967 season, Johnson led the Golden Bears to their third consecutive CIAA Championship and undefeated seasons. He set a school record by becoming the first quarterback to pass for over 1,000 yards in a single season, completing 54 percent of his passes for 1,050 yards. His senior year performance was so outstanding that he was selected first-team Maryland All-State as quarterback, first-team All-CIAA quarterback and first-team Pittsburgh Courier Black All-American defensive back.

Johnson finished his career leading Morgan State to the longest winning streak in college football at the time. The Golden Bears only lost two games during his four-year career. While playing for Morgan, he played quarterback, flanker, defensive back and was the teams placekicker.

Johnson is a member of Morgan State University's Varsity "M" Club athletic Hall Of Fame.

== Professional career ==
Johnson was selected 1968 Common draft in the eighth round. He would play for the American Football League's Boston Patriots (1968–1969), the National Football League's Boston Patriots (1970). Johnson became a starter in his rookie season. He was selected to the Boston Patriots All-Time Team of the Decades of the 1960s and honoured at a special pre-game and halftime ceremony on December 5, 1971, at Schaefer in conjunction with Gino Cappelletti Day. Daryl was also a starting defensive back in the World Football League with the Houston Texans/Shreveport Steamers.

== Personal life and death ==
Johnson was married to Helen Griffin and they had two children.

Johnson died on November 25, 2023, at the age of 77.
