= Ray Jacobs (defensive tackle) =

American football player (1938–2021)

No. 83, 84, 87
- Positions: Defensive tackle, Defensive end

Personal information
- Born: November 21, 1939; Corsicana, Texas, U.S.
- Died: November 15, 2021 (aged 81); Corsicana, Texas, U.S.
- Listed height: 6 ft 3 in (1.91 m)
- Listed weight: 285 lb (129 kg)

Career information
- High school: Corsicana
- College: Howard Payne (1960-1961)
- NFL draft: 1962: 17th round, 228th overall pick
- AFL draft: 1962: 1st round, 7th overall pick

Career history
- Houston Oilers (1962); Denver Broncos (1963–1966); Miami Dolphins (1967–1968); Oakland Raiders (1969)*; Buffalo Bills (1969)*; Boston Patriots (1969)
- * Offseason or practice squad member only

Awards and highlights
- Second-team All-AFL (1965); First-team Little All-American (1961); 2× NAIA All-American (1960, 1961); 3× All-LSC (1959–1961)

Career AFL statistics
- Sacks: 16.5
- Fumble recoveries: 2
- Stats at Pro Football Reference

Herschel Ray Jacobs (November 21, 1938 – November 15, 2021) was an American professional football player who was a defensive tackle in the American Football League (AFL) for the Denver Broncos, Miami Dolphins and Boston Patriots. He played college football at Howard Payne University.

== Early life ==
Jacobs was born on November 21, 1938, in Corsicana, Texas, to Myrtle and Arvel Lee Jacobs. He was one of ten children. He worked in cotton fields before and after school growing up. He attended Corsicana High School, and played on the school's football team at both offensive and defensive tackle. As a senior in 1956, he received the Daiches Award as the team's most valuable lineman; and was named to the All-District 8 AAA first team at tackle. He had knee injury issues as early as high school. Jacobs was also on the school's track team, including winning discus throwing competitions. He graduated high school weighing 226 lb (102.5 kg).

He was known for his rough character, even as a high schooler. He chewed tobacco during games, and would occasionally expectorate on opposing linemen's hands to gain an advantage when they jerked back. He would use his forearms to strike opposing players in the helmet. He reportedly was once arrested and handcuffed to his coach during a high school football game, watching the game from the sidelines. Jacobs said of himself looking back at this time in his life "'I thought I was the toughest kid in Texas . . . and I'd take every opportunity to prove it'".

== College career ==
Jacobs was offered a scholarship by Texas A&M, and attended a three-week freshman orientation after high school. While he could accept the hazing from good athletes, he could not abide the hazing from "rinky-dinks" and "dog athletes" and never registered to attend Texas A&M.

Instead, he attended Navarro Junior College (later Navarro College). He was first-team All-Texas Junior College Athletic Conference at tackle in 1958. Jacobs once said he was ejected from 10 games at Navarro because of his temper. He also threw discus and shot put at Navarro. He was All-Conference in track.

He later transferred to Howard Payne University, where he played offensive tackle, guard and defensive tackle. He was a two-time NAIA All-American and a three-time Lone Star Conference selection. He was an Associated Press first-team Little All American tackle in 1961. He was also reported to be a Little All America selection in 1960, but other sources indicate he was not. As a junior in 1960, he was 6 ft 4 in (1.93 m) 250 lb (113.4 kg). During one season at Howard Payne, he was ejected from nine of the 11 games in which he played. He was reported to be 6 ft 4 in 283 lb (128.4 kg) as a senior. He was selected to play in the 1962 Chicago College All-Star Game against the Green Bay Packers.

In 2005, Jacobs was inducted into the Howard Payne University Sports Hall of Fame. He was inducted to the Navarro College Athletic Hall of Fame in 2021.

== Professional career ==
=== 1962 draft and the Houston Oilers ===
Jacobs was selected by the Houston Oilers in the first round (7th overall) of the 1962 AFL draft and was also selected by the Dallas Cowboys in the seventeenth round (228th overall) of the 1962 NFL draft. Jacobs had signed a contract with the Oilers on November 29, 1961, days before the AFL draft. The Cowboys still pursued him under the theory that signing before the draft made the contract invalid, themselves signing a contract with Jacobs on December 4. The Oilers stated that the time of the signing did not effect its legality, as it was not part of a disavowed secret AFL draft.

While Jacobs was in a Waco, Texas hospital with a knee infection resulting from a blood clot that required surgery, two Cowboys' team representatives, allegedly along with baseball legend Mickey Mantle, had come to Jacobs' room after visiting hours and got him to sign a contract with the Cowboys. (There is no question that Mantle met with Jacobs at some point, as the Houston Post printed a photograph of Mantle visiting Jacobs in Brownwood, Texas during the winter of 1961-62.) Jacobs said the Cowboys told him that if the Oilers' contract was held valid, the Cowboys would not seek to enforce their contract.

Later, while preparing for the Chicago College All-Star Game in the summer of 1962, he was convinced that the solution to the situation was to sign a third contract with a Canadian Football League team. He ultimately chose to report to the Oilers training camp after AFL Commissioner Joe Foss declared the Oiler contract valid. During a practice game with the Chicago Bears one week before the All-Star game against the Green Bay Packers, he suffered a knee injury to the knee that had not been operated on earlier that year.

Jacobs came to the Oilers training camp during the first week of August 1962. Less than two weeks later, however, he had knee surgery for the torn cartilage he had suffered in the practice game against the Bears. Rather than cut him, the Oilers agreed to keep him on the team. However, he did not play during the 1962 season; and would never play a regular season game for the Oilers. During the 1963 Oilers training camp, besides playing defensive end, Jacobs also was tried as a placekicker; however, the Oilers waived Jacobs in mid-August 1963.

=== Denver Broncos (1963-66) ===
On October 29, 1963, or in September 1963, he was claimed off waivers by the Denver Broncos. In 1963, Jacobs played at left defensive end, starting four of the seven games in which he appeared. In 1964, the Broncos moved him to left defensive tackle, where he started 13 games and had 3.5 quarterback sacks that season. In 1965, Jacobs started all 14 games for the Broncos at left tackle again. He had five quarterback sacks. The Associated Press and Newspaper Enterprise Association (NEA) both named him second-team All-AFL in 1965. In 1966, he started seven of the 11 games in which he appeared, with two sacks.

=== Miami Dolphins (1967-68) ===
On May 4, 1967, he was traded to the Miami Dolphins in exchange for tight end Bill Cronin. He was listed at 6 ft 3 in (1.91 m) 285 lb (129 kg) when playing for the Dolphins. He started 11 of the 14 games in which he appeared that season, at left defensive tackle. He had three sacks, 62 unassisted tackles and 36 assisted tackles. The team voted him their best defensive lineman in 1967. In 1968, although he was limited during the season with multiple injuries, he started 11 games at right defensive tackle. He had two sacks, and led the Miami Dolphins with 107 tackles. While in Miami, he took up snake hunting as a hobby.

=== Oakland Raiders, Buffalo Bills, Boston Patriots (1969) ===
On March 4, 1969, he was traded to the Oakland Raiders in exchange for an undisclosed draft choice (not exercised). The Raiders released Jacobs before the start of the season, on September 9, 1969. Later in September 1969, he was signed by the Buffalo Bills to their development (taxi) squad, but did not play for the Bills during the season. On October 21, he was traded to the Boston Patriots in exchange for a 1971 eighth round draft choice (183rd overall, used to pick Louis Ross).

In 1969, he played in eight games for the Patriots, starting five at left defensive end. In his first game after being activated, on October 26 he recovered two fumbles against the New York Jets. On November 9, he recovered a blocked punt against the Dolphins. He was injured in the last game of the season against the Houston Oilers, suffering disc damage on his back requiring surgery.

1969 was his final season. Jacobs alleged in later legal proceedings against the Patriots, seeking compensation for his 1970 salary, that he was told by the Patriots not to report to training camp in 1970. Over his career, he started 65 games, with 16.5 sacks.

== Personal life and death ==
By the time Jacobs entered his final season in 1969, he had undergone eight knee operations since the late 1950s. After retiring from football, he was an assistant coach for one year at Howard Payne. He became a history teacher and football coach at Mabank High School. He was also a rancher near Roane, Texas, his wife's hometown. He later taught and coached at Corsicana High School, Navarro College, and Ranger Junior College; and then worked worked for 20 years as a probation officer in Navarro County, Texas.

Jacobs died on November 15, 2021, at the age of 81.
