= John Outlaw =

American football player (born 1945)

No. 44, 20
- Position: Defensive back

Personal information
- Born: January 8, 1946 (age 80); Clarksdale, Mississippi, U.S.
- Listed height: 5 ft 10 in (1.78 m)
- Listed weight: 180 lb (82 kg)

Career information
- High school: Higgins (Clarksdale)
- College: Jackson State
- NFL draft: 1968: 10th round, 249th overall pick

Career history
- Boston/New England Patriots (1969–1972); Philadelphia Eagles (1973–1978)

Career NFL/AFL statistics
- Interceptions: 16
- Fumble recoveries: 6
- Touchdowns: 2
- Stats at Pro Football Reference

John L. Outlaw (born January 8, 1946) is an American former professional football player who was a defensive back in the National Football League (NFL) for the Boston/New England Patriots and the Philadelphia Eagles. He also played in the American Football League (AFL) for the Patriots. Outlaw played college football for the Jackson State Tigers and was selected in the 10th round of the 1968 NFL/AFL draft.

== See also ==
- List of American Football League players
