= 1970 NFL season =

American football season

Regular season
- Duration: September 18 – December 20, 1970

Playoffs
- Start date: December 26, 1970
- AFC Champions: Baltimore Colts
- NFC Champions: Dallas Cowboys

Super Bowl V
- Date: January 17, 1971
- Site: Orange Bowl, Miami, Florida
- Champions: Baltimore Colts

Pro Bowl
- Date: January 24, 1971
- Site: Los Angeles Memorial Coliseum

AFC teams: West, Central, East
NFC teams: West, Central, East

The 1970 NFL season was the 51st regular season of the National Football League, and the first after the consummation of the AFL–NFL merger. The merged league realigned into two conferences: all ten of the American Football League (AFL) teams joined the Baltimore Colts, Cleveland Browns, and Pittsburgh Steelers to form the American Football Conference (AFC); the other thirteen NFL clubs formed the National Football Conference (NFC).

The season concluded in 1971 with Super Bowl V on January 17, as the Baltimore Colts beat the Dallas Cowboys 16–13 at the Orange Bowl in Miami, Florida. The Pro Bowl was the following Sunday; the NFC beat the AFC 27–6 at the Los Angeles Memorial Coliseum.

== Merger between NFL and AFL ==
The merger forced a realignment between the combined league's clubs. During the previous 1969 season, there were sixteen NFL teams and ten AFL teams:

1969 AFL teams
Eastern	Western
Buffalo Bills	Denver Broncos
Miami Dolphins	Kansas City Chiefs
Boston Patriots	Oakland Raiders
New York Jets	San Diego Chargers
Houston Oilers	Cincinnati Bengals

1969 NFL teams
Eastern		Western	
Capitol	Century	Central	Coastal
Dallas Cowboys	Cleveland Browns	Chicago Bears	Los Angeles Rams
New Orleans Saints	New York Giants	Detroit Lions	San Francisco 49ers
Philadelphia Eagles	Pittsburgh Steelers	Green Bay Packers	Atlanta Falcons
Washington Redskins	St. Louis Cardinals	Minnesota Vikings	Baltimore Colts

Because there were more NFL teams than AFL teams, three teams needed to be transferred to balance the two new conferences at thirteen teams each. In May 1969, the Baltimore Colts, Cleveland Browns, and Pittsburgh Steelers agreed to join the ten AFL teams to form the American Football Conference (AFC); the remaining NFL teams formed the National Football Conference (NFC).

Replacing the old Eastern and Western conferences (although divisions from those conferences still existed but were renamed to suit the realignment), the new conferences, AFC and NFC, function similar to Major League Baseball's American and National leagues, and each of those two were divided into three divisions: East, Central, and West. The two Eastern divisions had five teams; the other four divisions had four teams each. The realignment discussions for the NFC were so contentious that one final plan, out of five of them, was selected from an envelope in a vase by Commissioner Pete Rozelle's secretary, Thelma Elkjer on January 16, 1970.

The format agreed on was as follows:

1970 NFL teams
AFC	East	Central	West
AFC	Baltimore Colts	Cincinnati Bengals	Denver Broncos
AFC	Boston Patriots	Cleveland Browns	Kansas City Chiefs
AFC	Buffalo Bills	Houston Oilers	Oakland Raiders
AFC	Miami Dolphins	Pittsburgh Steelers	San Diego Chargers
AFC	New York Jets		
NFC	East	Central	West
NFC	Dallas Cowboys	Chicago Bears	Atlanta Falcons
NFC	New York Giants	Detroit Lions	Los Angeles Rams
NFC	Philadelphia Eagles	Green Bay Packers	New Orleans Saints
NFC	St. Louis Cardinals	Minnesota Vikings	San Francisco 49ers
NFC	Washington Redskins		

This arrangement would keep most of the pre-merger NFL teams in the NFC and the AFL teams in the AFC. Pittsburgh, Cleveland, and Baltimore were placed in the AFC in order to balance the conferences, while the NFC equalized the competitive strength of its East and West divisions rather than sorting out teams purely geographically.

Division alignment in 1970 largely kept traditional rivals in the same division. Plans were also made to add two expansion teams, but this would not take place until 1976, seven years after the merger, when the Tampa Bay Buccaneers and Seattle Seahawks joined the league.

The 26-team league also began to use an eight-team playoff format, four from each conference, that included the three division winners and a wild card team, the second-place team with the best record.

== Draft ==
The 1970 NFL draft was held from January 27 to 28, 1970, at New York City's Belmont Plaza Hotel. With the first pick, the Pittsburgh Steelers selected quarterback Terry Bradshaw from Louisiana Tech University.

== Major rule changes ==
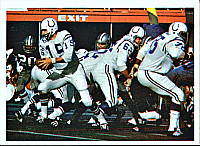
The Colts running an offensive play in Super Bowl V

The NFL rules became the standardized rules for the merged league, with two exceptions that were both carried over from the AFL:

- The stadium's scoreboard clock became the official game clock. An official (the line judge beginning in 1965) kept the official time on the field in the NFL; however, the scoreboard clock was the official timepiece for the four Super Bowls contested prior to the merger.
- The practice of having the players' last names added to the backs of their jerseys became universal. The old NFL teams did not have names on the back prior to this season, whereas the AFL teams did.

After experimenting with compromise rules regarding the two-point conversion (then exclusive to the AFL) during the late 1960s preseasons, the NFL decided not to use that feature and use its previous rule only allowing one point for any conversion. The two-point conversion would later be added to the NFL rules in 1994.

== Deaths ==
- March 2 - Paul Christman, age 51. Played quarterback for the Chicago Cardinals and Green Bay Packers. Led the Cardinals to the 1947 NFL Championship.
- March 17 - Clark Shaughnessy, age 78. Head coach for the Los Angeles Rams from 1947-1948, and Defensive Coordinator for the Chicago Bears from 1951-1962.
- June 16, 1970 - Brian Piccolo, age 26, Chicago Bears running back.
- July 21 - Bob Kalsu, age 25. Offensive guard for the Buffalo Bills. Killed while on active duty during the Vietnam War.
- July 31 - Jimmy Conzelman, age 72. Played Wing Back for the Detroit Lions, Milwaukee Badgers, and Providence Steam Roller. Elected to the Pro Football Hall Of Fame in 1964.
- September 3 - Vince Lombardi, age 57. Led the Green Bay Packers to five NFL Championships and two Super Bowl Championships, later was the head coach for the Washington Redskins.

== Division races ==
Starting in 1970, there were three divisions (Eastern, Central and Western) in each conference. The winners of each division, and a fourth "wild card" team based on the best non-division winner, qualified for the playoffs. The tiebreaker rules were changed to start with head-to-head competition, followed by intra-conference records and finally a coin flip. This became problematic during the final week of the regular season when potential victories by the Cowboys, Lions and Giants (all of whom were playing at home and favored to win) would have resulted in all three teams having similar records, New York winning the NFC East championship and a coin toss between Dallas and Detroit to decide the wild card. That possibility was averted when the Giants lost to the Rams. Because of this close call regarding possible use of coin toss, future tie-breakers would be expanded to have more competitive aspects.

National Football Conference

Week	Eastern		Central		Western		Wild Card	
1	Dallas	1–0–0	3 teams	1–0–0	3 teams	1–0–0	4 teams	1–0–0
2	Dallas	2–0–0	3 teams	2–0–0	2 teams	2–0–0	3 teams	2–0–0
3	St. Louis*	2–1–0	Detroit	3–0–0	Los Angeles	3–0–0	6 teams	2–1–0
4	St. Louis*	3–1–0	Detroit*	3–1–0	San Francisco*	3–1–0	4 teams	3–1–0
5	St. Louis	4–1–0	Detroit*	4–1–0	Los Angeles	4–1–0	Minnesota	4–1–0
6	St. Louis*	4–2–0	Detroit*	5–1–0	San Francisco	4–1–1	Minnesota	5–1–0
7	St. Louis*	5–2–0	Minnesota	6–1–0	San Francisco	5–1–1	3 teams	5–2–0
8	St. Louis	6–2–0	Minnesota	7–1–0	San Francisco	6–1–1	Los Angeles	5–2–1
9	St. Louis	7–2–0	Minnesota	8–1–0	San Francisco	7–1–1	N.Y. Giants	6–3–0
10	St. Louis	7–2–1	Minnesota	9–1–0	San Francisco	7–2–1	Los Angeles	6–3–1
11	St. Louis	8–2–1	Minnesota	9–2–0	Los Angeles*	7–3–1	San Francisco	7–3–1
12	St. Louis	8–3–1	Minnesota	10–2–0	Los Angeles*	8–3–1	San Francisco	8–3–1
13	N.Y. Giants*	9–4–0	Minnesota	11–2–0	San Francisco	9–3–1	Dallas*	9–4–0
14	Dallas	10–4–0	Minnesota	12–2–0	San Francisco	10–3–1	Detroit	10–4–0

American Football Conference

Week	Eastern		Central		Western		Wild Card	
1	2 teams	1–0–0	3 teams	1–0–0	Denver	1–0–0	3 teams	1–0–0
2	4 teams	1–1–0	3 teams	1–1–0	Denver	2–0–0	6 teams	1–1–0
3	Baltimore*	2–1–0	2 teams	2–1–0	Denver	3–0–0	2 teams	2–1–0
4	Baltimore*	3–1–0	Cleveland	3–1–0	Denver	3–1–0	Miami	3–1–0
5	Baltimore*	4–1–0	Cleveland	3–2–0	Denver	4–1–0	Miami	4–1–0
6	Baltimore	5–1–0	Cleveland	4–2–0	Denver	4–2–0	Miami	4–2–0
7	Baltimore	6–1–0	Cleveland	4–3–0	Oakland	3–2–2	Denver	4–3–0
8	Baltimore	7–1–0	Cleveland*	4–4–0	Oakland	4–2–2	Kansas City	4–3–1
9	Baltimore	7–1–1	Cleveland*	4–5–0	Oakland	5–2–2	Kansas City	5–3–1
10	Baltimore	7–2–1	Cleveland	5–5–0	Oakland	6–2–2	Kansas City	5–3–2
11	Baltimore	8–2–1	Cleveland*	5–6–0	Oakland*	6–3–2	Kansas City	6–3–2
12	Baltimore	9–2–1	Cleveland*	6–6–0	Oakland*	7–3–2	Kansas City	7–3–2
13	Baltimore	10–2–1	Cincinnati	7–6–0	Oakland	8–3–2	Miami	9–4–0
14	Baltimore	11–2–1	Cincinnati	8–6–0	Oakland	8–4–2	Miami	10–4–0

== Final standings ==
AFC East
	W	L	T	PCT	DIV	CONF	PF	PA	STK
Baltimore Colts	11	2	1	.846	6–1–1	8–2–1	321	234	W4
Miami Dolphins	10	4	0	.714	6–2	8–3	297	228	W6
New York Jets	4	10	0	.286	2–6	2–9	255	286	L3
Buffalo Bills	3	10	1	.231	3–4–1	3–7–1	204	337	L5
Boston Patriots	2	12	0	.143	2–6	2–9	149	361	L3

AFC Central
	W	L	T	PCT	DIV	CONF	PF	PA	STK
Cincinnati Bengals	8	6	0	.571	3–3	7–4	312	255	W7
Cleveland Browns	7	7	0	.500	4–2	7–4	286	265	W1
Pittsburgh Steelers	5	9	0	.357	3–3	5–6	210	272	L3
Houston Oilers	3	10	1	.231	2–4	3–7–1	217	352	L3

AFC West
	W	L	T	PCT	DIV	CONF	PF	PA	STK
Oakland Raiders	8	4	2	.667	4–0–2	7–2–2	300	293	L1
Kansas City Chiefs	7	5	2	.583	2–3–1	7–3–1	272	244	L2
San Diego Chargers	5	6	3	.455	2–2–2	4–4–3	282	278	W1
Denver Broncos	5	8	1	.385	1–4–1	3–6–1	253	264	L1

Note: Tie games were not officially counted in the standings until 1972.

NFC East
	W	L	T	PCT	DIV	CONF	PF	PA	STK
Dallas Cowboys	10	4	0	.714	5–3	7–4	299	221	W5
New York Giants	9	5	0	.643	6–2	6–5	301	270	L1
St. Louis Cardinals	8	5	1	.615	5–3	6–5	325	228	L3
Washington Redskins	6	8	0	.429	3–5	4–7	297	314	W2
Philadelphia Eagles	3	10	1	.231	1–7	1–9–1	241	332	W1

NFC Central
	W	L	T	PCT	DIV	CONF	PF	PA	STK
Minnesota Vikings	12	2	0	.857	5–1	10–1	335	143	W3
Detroit Lions	10	4	0	.714	4–2	7–4	347	202	W5
Green Bay Packers	6	8	0	.429	2–4	4–7	196	293	L2
Chicago Bears	6	8	0	.429	1–5	5–6	256	261	W2

NFC West
	W	L	T	PCT	DIV	CONF	PF	PA	STK
San Francisco 49ers	10	3	1	.769	3–2–1	6–3–1	352	267	W3
Los Angeles Rams	9	4	1	.692	4–1–1	7–3–1	325	202	W1
Atlanta Falcons	4	8	2	.333	3–2–1	3–6–2	206	261	L1
New Orleans Saints	2	11	1	.154	0–5–1	2–8–1	172	347	L6

=== Tiebreakers ===
- Green Bay finished ahead of Chicago in the NFC Central based on better division record (2–4 to Bears' 1–5).

== Playoffs ==
Note: Although the home teams in these playoffs were decided based on a yearly rotation, the home club coincidentally happened to be the one with the better record in every game. Had the playoffs been seeded, the only difference would have been that the #4 wild card Lions, ineligible to play the Vikings, would have played at the #2 49ers and the #3 Cowboys would have played at the #1 Vikings in the NFC divisional playoffs.

Dec 27 – Oakland Coliseum
WC	Miami	14
Jan 3 – Memorial Stadium
West	Oakland	21
AFC
West	Oakland	17
Dec 26 – Memorial Stadium
East	Baltimore	27
AFC Championship
Cent.	Cincinnati	0
Jan 17 – Miami Orange Bowl
East	Baltimore	17
Divisional round
AFC	Baltimore	16
Dec 26 – Cotton Bowl
NFC	Dallas	13
Super Bowl V
WC	Detroit	0
Jan 3 – Kezar Stadium
East	Dallas	5
NFC
East	Dallas	17
Dec 27 – Metropolitan Stadium
West	San Francisco	10
NFC Championship
West	San Francisco	17
Cent.	Minnesota	14

== Records ==
On November 8, New Orleans Saints placekicker Tom Dempsey kicked a record 63-yard field goal as time expired to win 19–17 over the visiting Detroit Lions. It bettered the previous record by seven yards (set seventeen years earlier by Bert Rechichar), and stood for 43 years (tied in 1998, 2011, and 2012) until it was broken in 2013 by Denver Broncos' Matt Prater. His record 64-yard field goal was at elevation in Denver on December 8, at the end of the first half. That record would stand until September 26, 2021, when Baltimore Ravens' Justin Tucker kicked a 66 yard field goal as time expired to win 19-17 over the Detroit Lions

The Denver Broncos, Detroit Lions, and Los Angeles Rams all started 3–0 but lost in Week Four. Only the Lions advanced to the postseason after the 3–0 start.

== Coaching changes ==
=== Offseason ===
- Baltimore Colts: Don McCafferty replaced Don Shula, who left the team to coach the Miami Dolphins.
- Miami Dolphins: Don Shula left the Baltimore Colts to replace the fired George Wilson as Miami's head coach.
- San Diego Chargers: Charlie Waller began his first full season as head coach. He replaced Sid Gillman to serve for five games in 1969 due to Gillman's poor health.
- Washington Redskins: Vince Lombardi was diagnosed with terminal cancer in late June and died on September 3. Offensive line coach Bill Austin served as Washington's head coach for the 1970 season.

Head coaches at the start of the merged 1970 NFL regular season
AFC			NFC		
East	Central	West	East	Central	West
Baltimore: Don McCafferty	Cincinnati: Paul Brown	Denver: Lou Saban	Dallas: Tom Landry	Chicago: Jim Dooley	Atlanta: Norm Van Brocklin
Boston: Clive Rush	Cleveland: Blanton Collier	Kansas City: Hank Stram	NY Giants: Alex Webster	Detroit: Joe Schmidt	Los Angeles: George Allen
Buffalo: John Rauch	Houston: Wally Lemm	Oakland: John Madden	Philadelphia: Jerry Williams	Green Bay: Phil Bengtson	New Orleans: Tom Fears
Miami: Don Shula	Pittsburgh: Chuck Noll	San Diego: Charlie Waller	St. Louis: Charley Winner	Minnesota: Bud Grant	San Francisco: Dick Nolan
NY Jets: Weeb Ewbank			Washington: Bill Austin		

=== In-season ===
- Boston Patriots: Clive Rush resigned after seven games into the season for medical reasons. John Mazur served as interim for the rest of the season and was hired as the full-time coach for 1971.
- New Orleans Saints : Tom Fears was fired after a 1–5–1 start. J. D. Roberts was named as his replacement and was hired as the full-time coach for 1971.

== Stadium changes ==
Before the season, the league had demanded that the Chicago Bears find a new home field: Wrigley Field was too small, as it did not meet the new stadium requirement to seat at least 50,000, and it did not have lights (installed in 1988), meaning it was unavailable for late afternoon and night games. The Chicago Cubs baseball team, which owned the stadium it shared with the Bears, did not want to convert it to a football configuration while the Cubs were still in playoff contention.

As a result, the Bears' first home game of the season against the Philadelphia Eagles was played at Northwestern University's Dyche Stadium; Chicago also treated this game as a trial run for possibly moving their home games to Evanston. Dyche Stadium (later renamed Ryan Field), did not have lights (nor did it install permanent standards prior to its demolition in early 2024), was planned as the Bears' new home, but a deal fell through due to strong opposition from several athletic directors in the Big Ten Conference and residents of Evanston. After negotiations with the Cubs' ownership for continued use of Wrigley Field collapsed, the Bears moved to Soldier Field in 1971 where they remain to the present day, save for a temporary relocation in 2002 to the University of Illinois' Memorial Stadium while Soldier Field was completely renovated.

The Boston Patriots played in their fourth facility in eleven seasons, leaving Alumni Stadium at Boston College for Harvard Stadium, the only facility in Massachusetts at that time which met the NFL's 50,000-seat minimum. The struggles to find a home led the Patriots to hastily construct Schaeffer Stadium in Foxborough, which opened in 1971. Renamed from "Boston" to "New England" when they moved, the Patriots continue to play in Foxborough in Gillette Stadium, which opened in 2002.

Two multi-purpose stadiums made their debut this season: Riverfront Stadium and Three Rivers Stadium, replacing Nippert Stadium and Pitt Stadium as the homes of the Cincinnati Bengals and Pittsburgh Steelers, respectively. This was also the last season in which Franklin Field was the home of the Philadelphia Eagles; they moved to Veterans Stadium, another multi-purpose stadium, in 1971.

Seven teams played their home games on artificial turf in 1970. This was up from 2 teams in both the NFL and AFL in 1969. The teams were: Cincinnati, Dallas, Miami, Pittsburgh and St. Louis, who joined Houston and Philadelphia, the two teams which played on turf in 1969. Super Bowl V was held at the Orange Bowl in Miami, and was the first Super Bowl played on artificial turf (specifically, Poly-Turf).

== Uniform changes ==
- The Dallas Cowboys moved the TV numbers on their jerseys from the shoulders to the sleeves. They remained on the sleeves of the white jersey through 1973 and the blue jersey through 1978.
- The Detroit Lions added trim to their helmet logo beginning in week five.
- The Minnesota Vikings added an alternate purple jersey with no sleeve striping, worn for warm-weather games.
- The Oakland Raiders used silver numbers instead of black on their white jerseys for the first time since 1963
- The Pittsburgh Steelers wore white pants with their white jerseys, the first time they wore white pants since wearing them for all games in 1965.
- The Philadelphia Eagles wore white helmets at all their games, discontinuing their practice of using green helmets with their white jerseys and white helmets with their green jerseys (the Eagles would switch back to wearing green helmets in 1974).
- The Washington Redskins switched from burgundy to gold helmets, and from the arrow helmet logo to a new logo featuring an "R" inside a circle with Native American feathers hanging down from the side

== Television changes ==
To televise their games, the combined league retained the services of CBS and NBC, who were previously the primary broadcasters of the NFL and the AFL, respectively. It was then decided that CBS would televise all NFC teams (including playoff games) while NBC all AFC teams. For interconference games, CBS would broadcast them if the visiting team was from the NFC and NBC would carry them when the visitors were from the AFC. At the time, all NFL games were blacked out in the home team's market, so this arrangement meant that fans in each team's home market would see all of their team's televised Sunday afternoon games on the same network (CBS for NFC teams and NBC for AFC teams). The two networks also divided up the Super Bowl on a yearly rotation, with the network of the designated visiting conference (NBC for odd-numbered games, CBS for even-numbered game) televising each game through Super Bowl XVIII. From 1970–73, whichever network did not televise the Super Bowl televised the Pro Bowl the next week.

Meanwhile, with the debut of Monday Night Football on ABC on September 21, 1970, the league became the first professional sports league in the United States to have a regular series of nationally televised games in prime-time, and the only league ever to have its games televised on all of the then-three major broadcast networks at the same time. Both teams that advanced to the Super Bowl, the Baltimore Colts (44-24 to the Chiefs) and the Dallas Cowboys (38-0 to the Cardinals), had suffered humiliating defeats at home on Monday Night Football during the season.

All three networks initially signed four-year television contracts through the 1973 season. The first MNF team consisted of veteran play-by-play announcer Keith Jackson, sportscaster Howard Cosell, and former Dallas Cowboys quarterback Don Meredith. Ray Scott remained as lead play-by-play announcer for CBS, but Pat Summerall replaced Paul Christman as that network's lead color commentator after Christman died from a heart attack on March 2, 1970. Curt Gowdy and Kyle Rote remained as NBC's lead broadcast team.

=== Official AFC team affiliates ===
Team	Affiliate
Baltimore Colts	WBAL
Boston Patriots	WBZ-TV
Buffalo Bills	WGR
Cincinnati Bengals	WLWT
Cleveland Browns	WKYC
Denver Broncos	KOA-TV
Houston Oilers	KPRC
Kansas City Chiefs	WDAF
Miami Dolphins	WCKT
New York Jets	WNBC
Oakland Raiders	KRON
Pittsburgh Steelers	WIIC
San Diego Chargers	KOCO

=== Official NFC team affiliates ===
Team	Affiliate
Atlanta Falcons	WAGA
Chicago Bears	WBBM
Detroit Lions	WJBK
Dallas Cowboys	KDFW
Green Bay Packers	WBAY
Minnesota Vikings	WCCO
New Orleans Saints	WWL-TV
New York Giants	WCBS
Philadelphia Eagles	WCAU
San Francisco 49ers	KPIX
St. Louis Cardinals	KMOX
Washington Redskins	WTOP
