= 1969 Buffalo Bills season =

10th season in franchise history

- Owner: Ralph Wilson
- Head coach: John Rauch
- Home stadium: War Memorial Stadium

Results
- Record: 4–10
- Division place: 4th AFL Eastern
- Playoffs: Did not qualify

The 1969 Buffalo Bills season was the team’s tenth season, and was the final season of the American Football League before the 1970 AFL-NFL merger. The Bills played an AFL-record seven games against opponents that went on to reach the postseason; Buffalo lost all seven of these games.

This was the rookie season for running back O. J. Simpson, the Heisman Trophy winner from Southern California and first overall selection in the draft, who went on to a Hall of Fame career. It was the final season for quarterback Jack Kemp, who decided to run for New York's 39th congressional district in 1970 that he ultimately won; elected at the age of 35, Kemp would serve in Congress until 1989.

Although Buffalo only won four games, their penultimate win—a Week Ten victory against the Miami Dolphins—would be their last victory against the Dolphins until the 1980 season. After the win, the Bills suffered against Miami an NFL-record twenty consecutive games lost by one team to another.

The last remaining active member of the 1969 Buffalo Bills was wide receiver Haven Moses, who retired after the 1981 NFL season.

== Offseason ==
- August 9, 1969: O. J. Simpson signs a four-year contract worth $215,000.
- August 20, 1969: The Bills acquired wide receiver Marlin Briscoe.
- August 25, 1969: Guard George Flint and defensive tackle Tom Sestak both announced their retirements.
- August 25, 1969: Running back/returner Ed Rutkowski was released by the Bills.

=== Draft ===
1969 Buffalo Bills draft
Round	Pick	Player	Position	College	Notes
1	1	O. J. Simpson * ^{†}	RB	USC	
2	27	Bill Enyart	RB	Oregon St	
3	53	Julian Nunamaker	DE	Tennessee-Martin	
4	79	Mike Richey	OT	North Carolina	
5	105	Ben Mayes	DE	Drake	
7	157	John Helton	DE	Arizona St	
8	183	Waddey Harvey	DT	Virginia Tech	
8	192	James Harris *	QB	Grambling State	
10	235	James Baines	WR	Montana	
11	261	Bobby Hall	RB	NC State	
12	287	Lloyd Pate	RB	Cincinnati	
12	312	Leon Lovelace	OT	Texas Tech	
14	339	Bubba Thornton	WR	TCU	
15	365	Karl Wilson	RB	Olivet	
16	391	Robert Kirk	OG	Indiana	
17	417	Wayne Lineberry	LB	East Carolina	
Made roster † Pro Football Hall of Fame * Made at least one Pro Bowl during career

=== Undrafted free agents ===
1969 undrafted free agents of note
Player	Position	College
Mark Proskine	Linebacker	Northwestern

== Personnel ==
=== Coaches/Staff ===
1969 Buffalo Bills staff
Front office: Majority Owner/President – Ralph Wilson; Vice President and General Manager – Bob Lustig; Vice President/Minority Owner – Pat McGroder; Coaching staff: Head coach - John Rauch; Offensive coaches: Wide Receivers - Bill Miller; Offensive Line – Marvin Bass; Defensive coaches: Defensive Line – Ray Malavasi; Linebackers – Ralph Hawkins; Defensive Backfield – Claude Gibson; Kickers - Bugsy Engelberg

- Source: https://pro-football-history.com/franchise/7/buffalo-bills-coaches

=== Final roster ===
1969 Buffalo Bills roster
Quarterbacks (QB): 15 Jack Kemp; 14 Tom Sherman; Running backs (RB): 22 Max Anderson; 41 Bill Enyart; 30 Wayne Patrick; 31 Preston Ridlehuber; 32 O. J. Simpson; Wide receivers (WR): 86 Marlin Briscoe; 83 Bobby Crockett; 25 Haven Moses; 28 Roy Reeves; 34 Bubba Thornton; Tight ends (TE): 80 Charley Ferguson; 85 Willie Grate; 87 Billy Masters	Offensive linemen (OL): 77 Stew Barber T; 50 Al Bemiller C; 79 Paul Costa T; 54 Howard Kindig C; 63 Bob Kruse G; 60 Angelo Loukas G; 67 Joe O'Donnell G; 75 Mike Richey T; 66 Billy Shaw G; Defensive linemen (DL): 74 Chuck DeVleigher DT; 78 Jim Dunaway DT; 65 Waddey Harvey DT; 76 Mike McBath DE; 72 Ron McDole DE; 69 Julian Nunamaker DE; 71 Bob Tatarek DT	Linebackers (LB): 52 Edgar Chandler OLB; 51 Jerald Collins OLB; 64 Harry Jacobs MLB; 53 Dave Ogas MLB; 58 Mike Stratton OLB; Defensive backs (DB): 42 Butch Byrd CB; 24 Booker Edgerson CB; 45 Hilton Crawford FS; 20 Robert James CB; 48 John Pitts SS; 47 Pete Richardson FS; Special teams (ST): 46 Bruce Alford K; 55 Paul Maguire P	Reserve: 62 Dick Cunningham T (IR); 10 Dan Darragh QB (IR); 33 Ben Gregory RB (IR); 59 Paul Guidry LB (IR); 12 James Harris QB (IR); -- Bob Kalsu G (Military); 26 George Saimes S (IR); Rookies in italics

== Preseason ==
Week	Date	Opponent	Result	Record	Game site	NFL.com recap
1	August 2	at Houston Oilers	L 7–24	0–1	Astrodome	Recap
2	August 8	Washington Redskins	W 21–17	1–1	War Memorial Stadium	Recap
3	August 15	at Detroit Lions	L 12–24	1–2	Tiger Stadium	Recap
4	August 22	Baltimore Colts	L 7–20	1–3	War Memorial Stadium	Recap
5	August 30	Chicago Bears	L 16–23	1–4	Cleveland Stadium	Recap
6	September 6	at Los Angeles Rams	L 20–50	1–5	Los Angeles Memorial Coliseum	Recap

== Regular season ==
=== Schedule ===
Week	Date	Opponent	Result	Record	Game site	Recap
1	September 14	**New York Jets**	**L** 19–33	0–1	War Memorial Stadium	Recap
2	September 21	**Houston Oilers**	**L** 3–17	0–2	War Memorial Stadium	Recap
3	September 28	Denver Broncos	**W** 41–28	1–2	War Memorial Stadium	Recap
4	October 5	at **Houston Oilers**	**L** 14–28	1–3	Astrodome	Recap
5	October 11	**Boston Patriots**	**W** 23–16	2–3	War Memorial Stadium	Recap
6	October 19	at Oakland Raiders	**L** 21–50	2–4	Oakland–Alameda County Coliseum	Recap
7	October 26	at **Miami Dolphins**	**L** 6–24	2–5	Miami Orange Bowl	Recap
8	November 2	Kansas City Chiefs	**L** 7–29	2–6	War Memorial Stadium	Recap
9	November 9	at **New York Jets**	**L** 6–16	2–7	Shea Stadium	Recap
10	November 16	**Miami Dolphins**	**W** 28–3	3–7	War Memorial Stadium	Recap
11	November 23	at **Boston Patriots**	**L** 21–35	3–8	Alumni Stadium	Recap
12	November 30	Cincinnati Bengals	**W** 16–13	4–8	War Memorial Stadium	Recap
13	December 7	at Kansas City Chiefs	**L** 19–22	4–9	Municipal Stadium	Recap
14	December 14	at San Diego Chargers	**L** 6–45	4–10	San Diego Stadium	Recap
Note: Intra-division opponents are in **bold** text.

=== Week 1 ===
Team	1	2	3	4	Total
• Jets	6	10	3	14	33
Bills	3	0	6	10	19

- Date: September 14
- Location: War Memorial Stadium
- Game attendance: 46,165
- Game weather: 70 °F (21 °C); wind 11 mph

=== Week 2 ===
Team	1	2	3	4	Total
• Oilers	0	7	3	7	17
Bills	3	0	0	0	3

- Date: September 21
- Location: War Memorial Stadium
- Game attendance: 40,146
- Game weather: 58 °F (14 °C); wind 6 mph

=== Week 3 ===
Team	1	2	3	4	Total
Broncos	14	0	7	7	28
• Bills	3	17	21	0	41

- Date: September 28
- Location: War Memorial Stadium
- Game attendance: 40,302
- Game weather: 53 °F (12 °C); wind 9 mph

=== Week 4 ===
Team	1	2	3	4	Total
Bills	0	0	7	7	14
• Oilers	7	7	7	7	28

- Date: October 5
- Location: Houston Astrodome
- Game attendance: 46,485
- Game weather: Indoors (dome)

=== Week 5 ===
Team	1	2	3	4	Total
Patriots	6	0	7	3	16
• Bills	7	3	3	10	23

- Date: October 11
- Location: War Memorial Stadium
- Game attendance: 46,201
- Game weather: 67 °F (19 °C); wind 14 mph

=== Week 6 ===
Team	1	2	3	4	Total
Bills	0	7	0	14	21
• Raiders	14	28	6	2	50

- Date: October 19
- Location: Oakland–Alameda County Coliseum
- Game attendance: 54,418
- Game weather: 56 °F (13 °C); wind 8 mph

=== Week 7 ===
Team	1	2	3	4	Total
Bills	3	0	3	0	6
• Dolphins	0	14	3	7	24

- Date: October 26
- Location: Orange Bowl
- Game attendance: 39,837
- Game weather: 79 °F (26 °C); wind 14 mph

=== Week 8 ===
Team	1	2	3	4	Total
• Chiefs	0	3	3	23	29
Bills	7	0	0	0	7

- Date: November 2
- Location: War Memorial Stadium
- Game attendance: 45,844
- Game weather: 56 °F (13 °C); wind 13 mph

=== Week 9 ===
Team	1	2	3	4	Total
Bills	0	3	3	0	6
• Jets	0	7	3	6	16

- Date: November 9
- Location: Shea Stadium
- Game attendance: 62,680
- Game weather: 52 °F (11 °C); wind 19 mph

=== Week 10 ===
Team	1	2	3	4	Total
Dolphins	3	0	0	0	3
• Bills	7	7	7	7	28

- Date: November 16
- Location: War Memorial Stadium
- Game attendance: 32,686
- Game weather: 28 °F (−2 °C); wind 16 mph

Scoring summary
Q1	BUF	Simpson 8 yard pass from Kemp (Alford kick)	BUF 7–0
Q1	MIA	Kremser 21 yard field goal	BUF 7–3
Q2	BUF	Briscoe 12 yard pass from Kemp (Alford kick)	BUF 14–3
Q3	BUF	Enyart 1 yard run (Alford kick)	BUF 21–3
Q4	BUF	Simpson 55 yard pass from Kemp (Alford kick)	BUF 28–3

- O. J. Simpson 72 Rush Yds, 81 Rec Yds

=== Week 11 ===
Team	1	2	3	4	Total
Bills	7	7	7	0	21
• Patriots	14	7	0	14	35

- Date: November 23
- Location: Alumni Stadium
- Game attendance: 25,584
- Game weather: 42 °F (6 °C); wind 14 mph

=== Week 12 ===
Team	1	2	3	4	Total
Bengals	3	3	0	7	13
• Bills	3	3	10	0	16

- Date: November 30
- Location: War Memorial Stadium
- Game attendance: 35,122
- Game weather: 28 °F (−2 °C); wind 17 mph

=== Week 13 ===
Team	1	2	3	4	Total
Bills	3	0	10	6	19
• Chiefs	7	6	3	6	22

- Date: December 7
- Location: Kansas City Municipal Stadium
- Game attendance: 47,112
- Game weather: 34 °F (1 °C); wind 14 mph

=== Week 14 ===
Team	1	2	3	4	Total
Bills	0	0	0	6	6
• Chargers	10	14	7	14	45

- Date: December 14
- Location: San Diego Stadium
- Game attendance: 47,582
- Game weather: 57 °F (14 °C); wind 6 mph

== Standings ==
AFL Eastern Division
	W	L	T	PCT	DIV	PF	PA	STK
New York Jets	10	4	0	.714	8–0	353	269	W2
Houston Oilers	6	6	2	.500	5–3	278	279	W1
Boston Patriots	4	10	0	.286	3–5	266	316	L2
Buffalo Bills	4	10	0	.286	2–6	230	359	L2
Miami Dolphins	3	10	1	.231	2–6	233	332	L1

Note: Tie games were not officially counted in the standings of the AFL. This was the final year of the AFL The Baltimore Colts would join the AFL eastern teams and become the AFC East in 1970.
