= 1968 Buffalo Bills season =

9th season in franchise history

- Owner: Ralph Wilson
- Head coach: Joe Collier and Harvey Johnson
- Home stadium: War Memorial Stadium

Results
- Record: 1–12–1
- Division place: 5th AFL Eastern
- Playoffs: Did not qualify

The 1968 Buffalo Bills season was the team’s ninth season.

The Bills' 1–12–1 record in 1968 (a 0.107 winning percentage) is the second-worst in team history: the 1971 Bills went 1–13. They were one of only two teams in AFL history (the other being the 1962 Oakland Raiders) to finish the season with only one victory. The record landed the Bills with the first overall pick in the draft, which they used to take 1968 Heisman Trophy winner O. J. Simpson from USC.

The Bills, coming off a 4–10 season in 1967, fired coach Joe Collier after an 0–2 start in 1968. Defensive backfield coach Harvey Johnson was promoted to interim head coach, where he went 1–10–1 to finish the year.

With the release of running back Wray Carlton, wide receiver Elbert Dubenion was the last player from the Bills' original roster in 1960 to still be with the team.

The majority of Buffalo's games were started by backup quarterback Dan Darragh, after injuries claimed the seasons of long-time starter Jack Kemp and new addition Tom Flores. Even Darragh and new addition Kay Stephenson were injured. Ultimately, running back Ed Rutkowski, who hadn't played the quarterback position since college six years prior, ended up starting at quarterback for the Bills.

Buffalo's only win of the season was a home victory over the New York Jets, who eventually went on to win Super Bowl III. In that game, the Bills held a 16-point lead in the fourth quarter before giving up two late touchdowns to the Jets. Ultimately, the Bills were able to hold on to the two-point win. Through the 2025 season, this is the only instance in which a team that had only 1 win have that win come against the eventual Super Bowl champion.

== Offseason ==
- August 24: Bills sign fullback Wayne Patrick.
- August 27: Bills acquire quarterback (and future Bills head coach) Kay Stephenson from the San Diego Chargers for a Fifth Round Pick.
- August 28: Bills acquire fullback Bob Cappadona from the Boston Patriots for a ninth round draft pick.
- September 2: The Bills cut running backs Wray Carlton, wide receiver Ed Rutkowski (who would return later in the season as a quarterback), tight end Charley Ferguson and defensive tackle Dudley Meredith.

=== AFL draft ===
1968 Buffalo Bills draft
Round	Pick	Player	Position	College	Notes
1	9	Haven Moses *	Wide receiver	San Diego State	
2	34	Bob Tatarek	Defensive tackle	Miami (FL)	
3	63	Richard Trapp	Wide receiver	Florida	
4	86	Edgar Chandler	Linebacker	Georgia	
5	114	Ben Gregory	Running back	Nebraska	
5	119	Mike McBath	Defensive end	Penn State	
5	132	Max Anderson	Running back	Arizona State	
7	173	Pete Richardson	Safety	Dayton	
8	199	Bob Kalsu	Guard	Oklahoma	
9	227	Gary McDermott	Running back	Tulsa	
Made roster * Made at least one Pro Bowl during career

== Personnel ==
=== Coaches/Staff ===
1968 Buffalo Bills staff
Front office: Majority Owner/President – Ralph Wilson; Vice President and General Manager – Bob Lustig; Vice President/Minority Owner – Pat McGroder; Coaching staff: Head Coach - Joe Collier (fired earlier in season); Interim Head Coach - Harvey Johnson; Offensive coaches: Wide Receivers - John Mazur & Bob Celeri; Offensive Backfield Coach - John Mazur; Offensive Line – Jerry Smith & Marvin Bass; Defensive coaches: Defensive Backfield – Richie McCabe; Kickers - Harvey Johnson

- Source: https://pro-football-history.com/franchise/7/buffalo-bills-coaches

=== Final roster ===
1968 Buffalo Bills roster
Quarterbacks (QB): 10 Dan Darragh; 3 Benny Russell; Running backs (RB): 22 Max Anderson; 23 Charlie Brown; 36 Bob Cappadona; 32 Gary McDermott; 30 Wayne Patrick; 40 Ed Rutkowski QB; Wide receivers (WR): 83 Bobby Crockett; 43 Monte Ledbetter; 25 Haven Moses; 28 Richard Trapp; Tight ends (TE): 82 Paul Costa; 87 Billy Masters	Offensive linemen (OL): 77 Stew Barber T; 50 Al Bemiller C/G; 62 Dick Cunningham T; 63 George Flint G; 61 Bob Kalsu G; 73 Howard Kindig C; 76 Mike McBath T; 66 Billy Shaw G; Defensive linemen (DL): 89 Tom Day DE; 78 Jim Dunaway DT; 72 Ron McDole DE; 70 Tom Sestak DT; 71 Bob Tatarek DT	Linebackers (LB): 52 Edgar Chandler MLB; 59 Paul Guidry OLB; 64 Harry Jacobs MLB; 57 Marty Schottenheimer OLB; 58 Mike Stratton OLB; Defensive backs (DB): 42 Butch Byrd CB; 45 Hagood Clarke FS; 27 Tom Janik SS; 21 Jerry Lawson CB; 48 John Pitts SS; 26 George Saimes FS; Special teams (ST): 46 Bruce Alford K; 55 Paul Maguire P	Practice squad: 80 Charley Ferguson TE; Reserve: -- Wayne DeSutter T (Military); 74 Chuck DeVleigher DT (IR); 44 Elbert Dubenion WR (Retired); 24 Booker Edgerson CB (IR); 16 Tom Flores QB (IR); 33 Ben Gregory RB (IR); 79 Dick Hudson T (IR); 15 Jack Kemp QB (IR); 67 Joe O'Donnell G (IR); 18 Kay Stephenson QB (IR); 88 Bill Wilkerson DE (IR); Rookies in italics

== Preseason ==
Week	Date	Opponent	Result	Record	Venue	Recap
1	August 5	Detroit Lions	W 13–9	1–0	War Memorial Stadium	Recap
2	August 11	Miami Dolphins	T 28–28	1–0–1	War Memorial Stadium	Recap
3	August 17	Cincinnati Bengals	L 6–10	1–1–1	Nippert Stadium	Recap
4	August 23	Houston Oilers	L 7–37	1–2–1	Astrodome	Recap
5	August 30	Cleveland Browns	L 12–22	1–3–1	War Memorial Stadium	Recap

== Regular season ==
=== Schedule ===
Week	Date	Opponent	Result	Record	Venue	Recap
1	September 8	**Boston Patriots**	**L** 7–16	0–1	War Memorial Stadium	Recap
2	September 15	Oakland Raiders	**L** 6–48	0–2	War Memorial Stadium	Recap
3	September 22	at Cincinnati Bengals	**L** 23–34	0–3	Nippert Stadium	Recap
4	September 29	**New York Jets**	**W** 37–35	1–3	War Memorial Stadium	Recap
5	October 5	Kansas City Chiefs	**L** 7–18	1–4	War Memorial Stadium	Recap
6	October 12	at Miami Dolphins	**T** 14–14	1–4–1	Miami Orange Bowl	Recap
7	October 20	at **Boston Patriots**	**L** 6–23	1–5–1	Fenway Park	Recap
8	October 27	**Houston Oilers**	**L** 7–30	1–6–1	War Memorial Stadium	Recap
9	November 3	at **New York Jets**	**L** 21–25	1–7–1	Shea Stadium	Recap
10	November 10	**Miami Dolphins**	**L** 17–23	1–8–1	War Memorial Stadium	Recap
11	November 17	San Diego Chargers	**L** 6–21	1–9–1	War Memorial Stadium	Recap
12	November 24	at Denver Broncos	**L** 32–34	1–10–1	Mile High Stadium	Recap
13	November 28	at Oakland Raiders	**L** 10-13	1–11–1	Oakland-Alameda County Coliseum	Recap
14	December 7	at **Houston Oilers**	**L** 6–35	1–12–1	Astrodome	Recap
Note: Intra-division opponents are in **bold** text.

=== Standings ===
AFL Eastern Division
	W	L	T	PCT	DIV	PF	PA	STK
New York Jets	11	3	0	.786	7–1	419	280	W4
Houston Oilers	7	7	0	.500	5–3	303	248	W2
Miami Dolphins	5	8	1	.385	4–3–1	276	355	L1
Boston Patriots	4	10	0	.286	2–6	229	406	L2
Buffalo Bills	1	12	1	.077	1–6–1	199	367	L8

Note: Tie games were not officially counted in the standings in the AFL.

=== Game summaries ===
==== Week 12 vs. Raiders ====
Buffalo Bills (1–10–1) at Oakland Raiders (9–2)

Quarter	1	2	3	4	Total
Bills	0	3	0	7	**10**
Raiders	0	3	10	0	**13**

at Oakland-Alameda County Coliseum • Oakland, California

- Date: November 28
- Game weather: 54 °F (12 °C) • Wind 5
- Game attendance: 39,883
- Pro-Football-Reference.com

Game information

Bills

- Ed Rutkowski
  10/25, 160 Yds, 2 INT
- Max Anderson
  11 Rush, 60 Yds, TD
  2 Rec, 31 Yds

Raiders

- Daryle Lamonica
  12/32, 145 Yds, INT
- Charlie Smith
  12 Rush, 54 Yds
- Warren Wells
  3 Rec, 61 Yds

Thanksgiving Day

Scoring summary

Quarter	Time	Drive			Team	Scoring information	Score	
Quarter	Time	Plays	Yards	TOP	Team	Scoring information	BUF	OAK
2					Raiders	39-yard field goal by Blanda	0	3
2					Bills	26-yard field goal by Alford	3	3
3					Raiders	33-yard field goal by Blanda	3	6
3					Raiders	Interception returned 33 yards for touchdown by Atkinson, Blanda kick good	3	13
4					Bills	Anderson 5-yard touchdown run, Alford kick good	10	13
"TOP" = time of possession. For other American football terms, see Glossary of American football.							10	13

=== Awards and Records ===
- Bob Kalsu, Team Rookie of the Year
