= 1971 Buffalo Bills season =

12th season in franchise history

- Owner: Ralph Wilson
- Head coach: Harvey Johnson
- Home stadium: War Memorial Stadium

Results
- Record: 1–13
- Division place: 5th AFC East
- Playoffs: Did not qualify
- Pro Bowlers: None

The 1971 Buffalo Bills season was the franchise's second season in the National Football League, and the 12th overall. For the second time in four seasons, the Bills finished with only one victory. The Bills 1–13 record (a 0.071 winning percentage) remains the worst in franchise history. The team allowed 394 points, the most in franchise history for a 14-game season.

The season began in turmoil when coach John Rauch resigned, forcing pro personnel director Harvey Johnson to assume the position for the second time on an interim basis. (Note: Lou Saban, who resigned as coach of the Denver Broncos after eight games in 1971, would return to Buffalo in 1972; Saban had previously guided the Bills to consecutive American Football League championships in 1964 and 1965.)

Buffalo lost their first ten games of the season, extending their losing streak to 15 and winless streak to 17, dating back to the previous season. The Bills were held scoreless in four games; and their minus 210-point differential is the worst in the team's history, and one of the forty worst point-differentials in NFL history.

Despite their horrid record, running back O. J. Simpson still had a stellar year, rushing for 742 yards on 183 attempts. However, Simpson only scored 5 touchdowns, which would be the fewest in his career. The Bills would only score 21 touchdowns as a team during the 1971 season, a franchise low. The Bills did not field any pro bowlers after the season.

== Offseason ==
=== NFL draft ===
The Bills had a strong draft in 1971, selecting several players who would have long-term impact with the team.

- Wide receiver J. D. Hill played five seasons for the Bills, making the Pro Bowl in his second season.
- Fullback Jim Braxton was an effective blocker for star tailback O. J. Simpson for the next seven seasons.
- Right tackle Donnie Green became a key component in the Bills' "Electric Company" offensive line for the next seven seasons.
- Receiver Bob Chandler played with the Bills for nine seasons, making second team All-Pro in 1975 and 1977, and leading the league in receptions from '75–'77, with 176 catches.

= Pro Bowler (Note: Players are identified as a Pro Bowler if they were selected for the Pro-Bowl at any time in their career.)

1971 Buffalo Bills Draft
Round	Selection	Player	Position	College	Notes
1	4	J. D. Hill	WR	Arizona State	
2	29	Jan White	TE	Ohio State	
3	53	Bruce Jarvis	C	Washington	
3	57	Jim Braxton	FB	West Virginia	
5	107	Donnie Green	OT	Purdue	
5	113	Tim Beamer	DB	Illinois	
6	145	Bill McKinley	DE	Arizona	
7	160	Bob Chandler	WR	USC	
8	183	Louis Ross	DE	South Carolina State	
8	185	Tyrone Walls	RB	Missouri	
9	213	Bob Strickland	LB	Auburn	
11	263	Andy Browder	T	Texas A&I	
12	291	Jim Sheffield	K	Texas A&M	
13	316	Busty Underwood	QB	TCU	
14	341	Jim Hoots	DE	Missouri Southern	
15	369	Charles Cole	RB	Toledo	
16	394	Billy Hunter	DB	Utah	
17	419	Pat Morrison	TE	Arkansas	

== Personnel ==
=== Coaches/Staff ===
1971 Buffalo Bills staff
Front office: President – Ralph Wilson; Vice President and General Manager – Bob Lustig; Vice President – Pat McGroder; Coaching staff: Head coach - Harvey Johnson; Offensive coaches: Quarterbacks coach - Tom Flores; Offensive Line – Marvin Bass; Defensive coaches': Defensive Line – Doc Urich; Linebackers – Ralph Hawkins; Defensive Backfield – Bobby Hunt

- Source: https://pro-football-history.com/franchise/7/buffalo-bills-coaches

=== Final roster ===
1971 Buffalo Bills roster
Quarterbacks (QB): 12 James Harris; 16 Dennis Shaw; Running backs (RB): 34 Jim Braxton; 36 Greg Jones; 30 Wayne Patrick; 32 O. J. Simpson; Wide receivers (WR): 86 Marlin Briscoe; 81 Bob Chandler; 28 Ike Hill; 40 J. D. Hill; 25 Haven Moses; Tight ends (TE): 85 Ted Koy; 80 Jan White	Offensive linemen (OL): 62 Levert Carr G/T; 79 Paul Costa T; 74 Donnie Green T; 51 Bruce Jarvis C; 54 Howard Kindig C; 61 Jim Reilly G; 65 Michael Wilson G; 68 Willie Young T; Defensive linemen (DL): 82 Al Cowlings DE; 78 Jim Dunaway DT; 64 Chuck Hurston DE; 76 Mike McBath DT; 75 Cal Snowden DE; 71 Bob Tatarek DT	Linebackers (LB): 56 Al Andrews OLB; 52 Edgar Chandler MLB; 63 Dick Cunningham MLB; 59 Paul Guidry OLB; 58 Mike Stratton OLB; Defensive backs (DB): 21 Jackie Allen FS; 46 Tim Beamer SS; 43 Tony Greene CB; 20 Robert James CB; 48 John Pitts SS; 41 Alvin Wyatt CB; Special teams (ST): 11 Spike Jones P; 3 John Leypoldt K	Practice squad: 51 Jerald Collins LB; 26 Clyde Glosson WR; 72 Bob Hews DE; 87 Louis Ross DE; 60 Steve Svitak LB; 17 Busty Underwood QB; Reserve: 73 Richard Cheek G (IR); 55 Bill McKinley LB (IR); 88 Julian Nunamaker DT (IR); 67 Joe O'Donnell G (IR); 50 Dick Palmer LB (IR); 47 Pete Richardson S (IR); Rookies in italics

== Regular season ==
=== Schedule ===
Week	Date	Opponent	Result	Record	Venue	Recap
1	September 19	Dallas Cowboys	**L** 37–49	0–1	War Memorial Stadium	Recap
2	September 26	**Miami Dolphins**	**L** 14–29	0–2	War Memorial Stadium	Recap
3	October 3	at Minnesota Vikings	**L** 0–19	0–3	Metropolitan Stadium	Recap
4	October 10	**Baltimore Colts**	**L** 0–43	0–4	War Memorial Stadium	Recap
5	October 17	at **New York Jets**	**L** 17–28	0–5	Shea Stadium	Recap
6	October 23	at San Diego Chargers	**L** 3–20	0–6	San Diego Stadium	Recap
7	October 31	St. Louis Cardinals	**L** 23–28	0–7	War Memorial Stadium	Recap
8	November 7	at **Miami Dolphins**	**L** 0–34	0–8	Miami Orange Bowl	Recap
9	November 14	at **New England Patriots**	**L** 33–38	0–9	Schaefer Stadium	Recap
10	November 21	**New York Jets**	**L** 7–20	0–10	War Memorial Stadium	Recap
11	November 28	**New England Patriots**	**W** 27–20	1–10	War Memorial Stadium	Recap
12	December 5	at **Baltimore Colts**	**L** 0–24	1–11	Memorial Stadium	Recap
13	December 12	Houston Oilers	**L** 14–20	1–12	War Memorial Stadium	Recap
14	December 19	at Kansas City Chiefs	**L** 9–22	1–13	Municipal Stadium	Recap
Note: Intra-division opponents are in **bold** text.

=== Standings ===
AFC East
	W	L	T	PCT	DIV	CONF	PF	PA	STK
Miami Dolphins	10	3	1	.769	5–3	7–3–1	315	174	W1
Baltimore Colts	10	4	0	.714	6–2	8–3	313	140	L1
New England Patriots	6	8	0	.429	4–4	6–5	238	325	W1
New York Jets	6	8	0	.429	4–4	6–5	212	299	W2
Buffalo Bills	1	13	0	.071	1–7	1–10	184	394	L3

Note: Tie games were not officially counted in the standings until 1972.

=== Game summaries ===
==== Week 11 ====
Team	1	2	3	4	Total
Patriots	3	3	7	7	20
• Bills	0	17	0	10	27

- Date: November 28
- Location: War Memorial Stadium
- Game start: 1:00 p.m. EST
- Game attendance: 27,166
- Game weather: 38 °F (3.3 °C); wind 12 mph (19 km/h)

Scoring summary
Q1	NE	Gogolak 40 yard field goal	NE 3–0
Q2	BUF	Hill 11 yard pass from Shaw (Leypoldt kick)	BUF 7–3
Q2	NE	Gogolak 17 yard field goal	BUF 7–6
Q2	BUF	Hill 47 yard pass from Shaw (Leypoldt kick)	BUF 14–6
Q2	BUF	Leypoldt 48 yard field goal	BUF 17–6
Q3	NE	Nance 1 yard run (Gogolak kick)	BUF 17–13
Q4	BUF	Simpson 7 yard run (Leypoldt kick)	BUF 24–13
Q4	NE	Sellers 12 yard pass from Plunkett (Gogolak kick)	BUF 24–20
Q4	BUF	Leypoldt 41 yard field goal	BUF 27–20
