= List of Buffalo Bills starting quarterbacks =

These quarterbacks have started at least one game for the Buffalo Bills of the National Football League (NFL). The Bills are a professional American football franchise based in the Buffalo–Niagara Falls metropolitan area. The quarterbacks are listed in order of the date of each player's first start for the team at that position.

== Starting quarterbacks ==
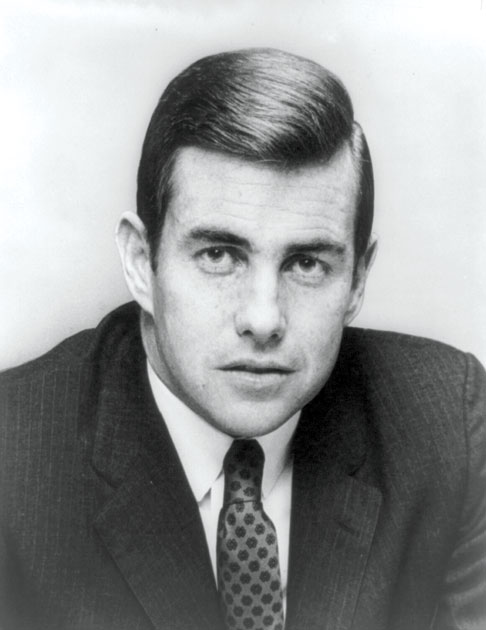
Prior to his political career, Jack Kemp won two AFL championships with the Bills

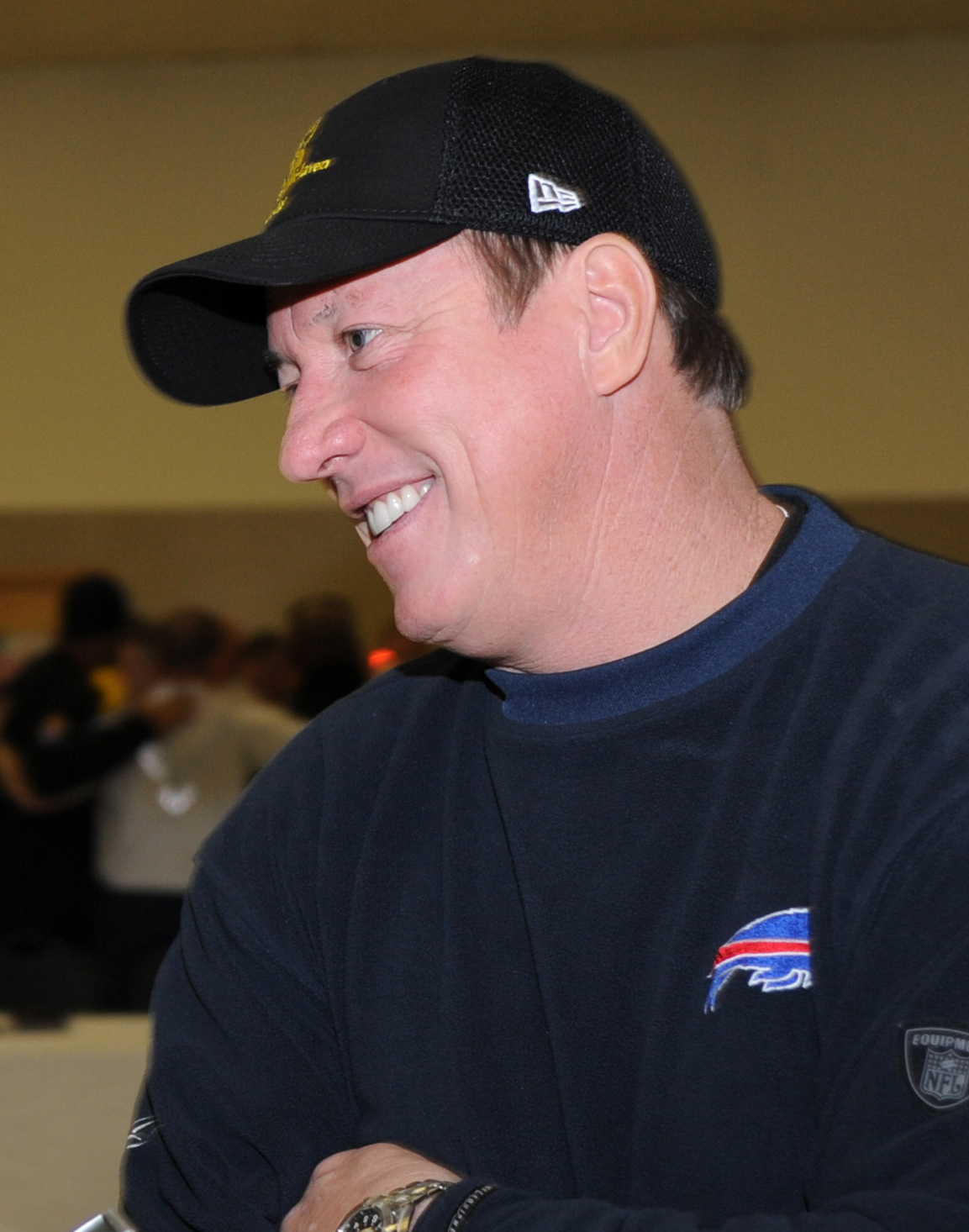
Under the "K-Gun" offense, Jim Kelly led Buffalo to a record four consecutive Super Bowls

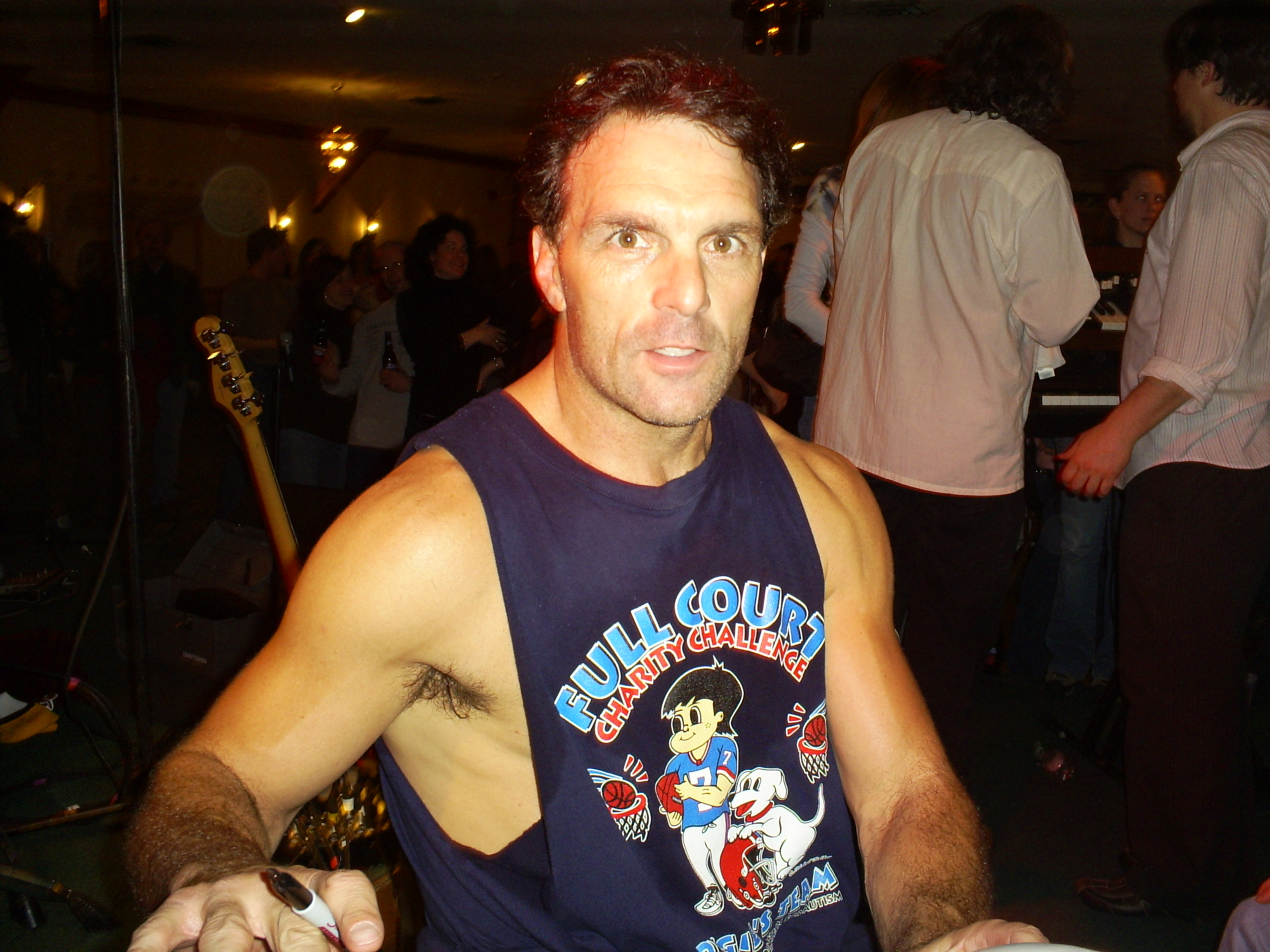
Doug Flutie was the last quarterback to bring the Bills to the playoffs for nearly two decades

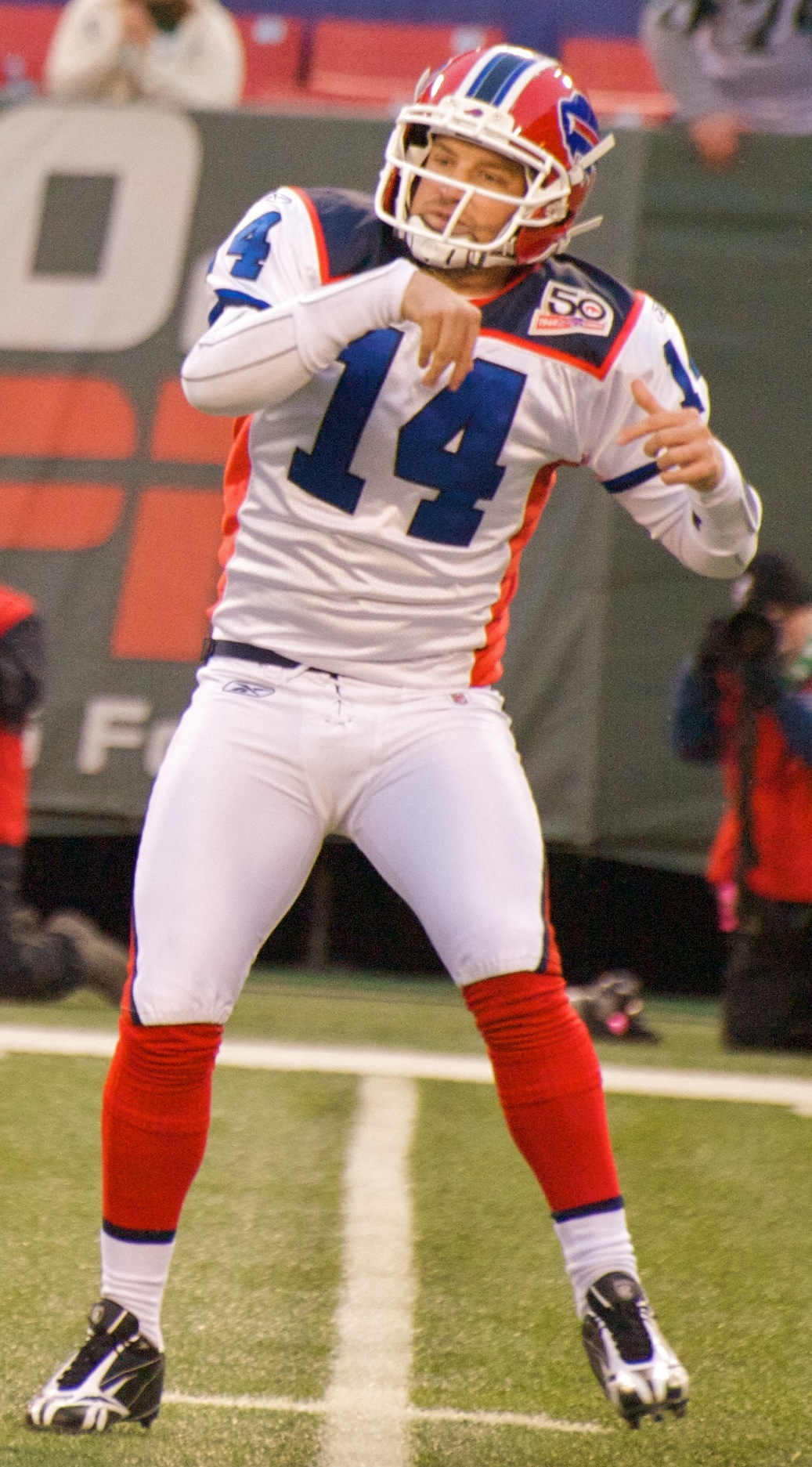
A member of nine NFL teams, Ryan Fitzpatrick had his longest stint with the Bills

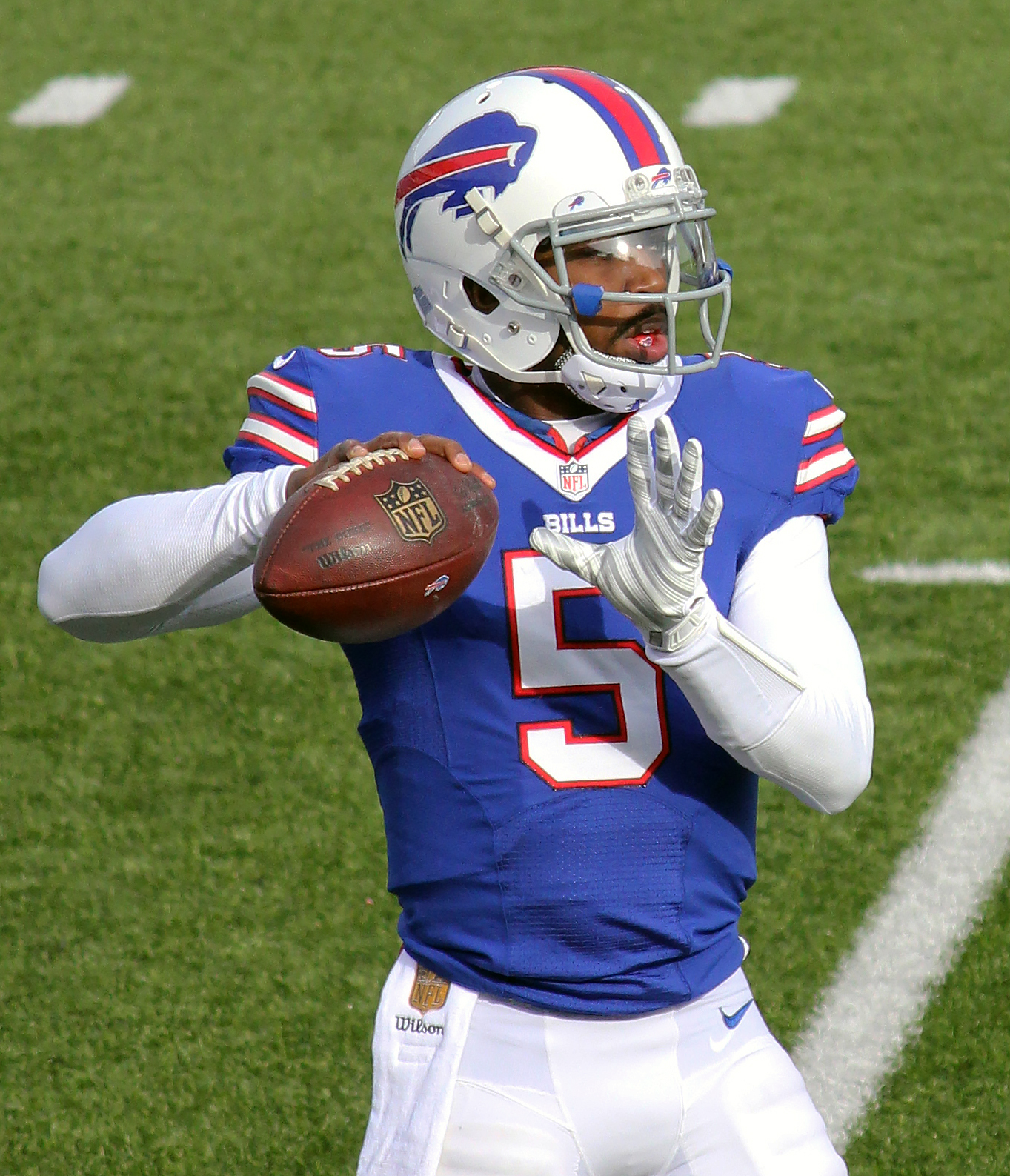
Tyrod Taylor helped end Buffalo's 17-year playoff drought

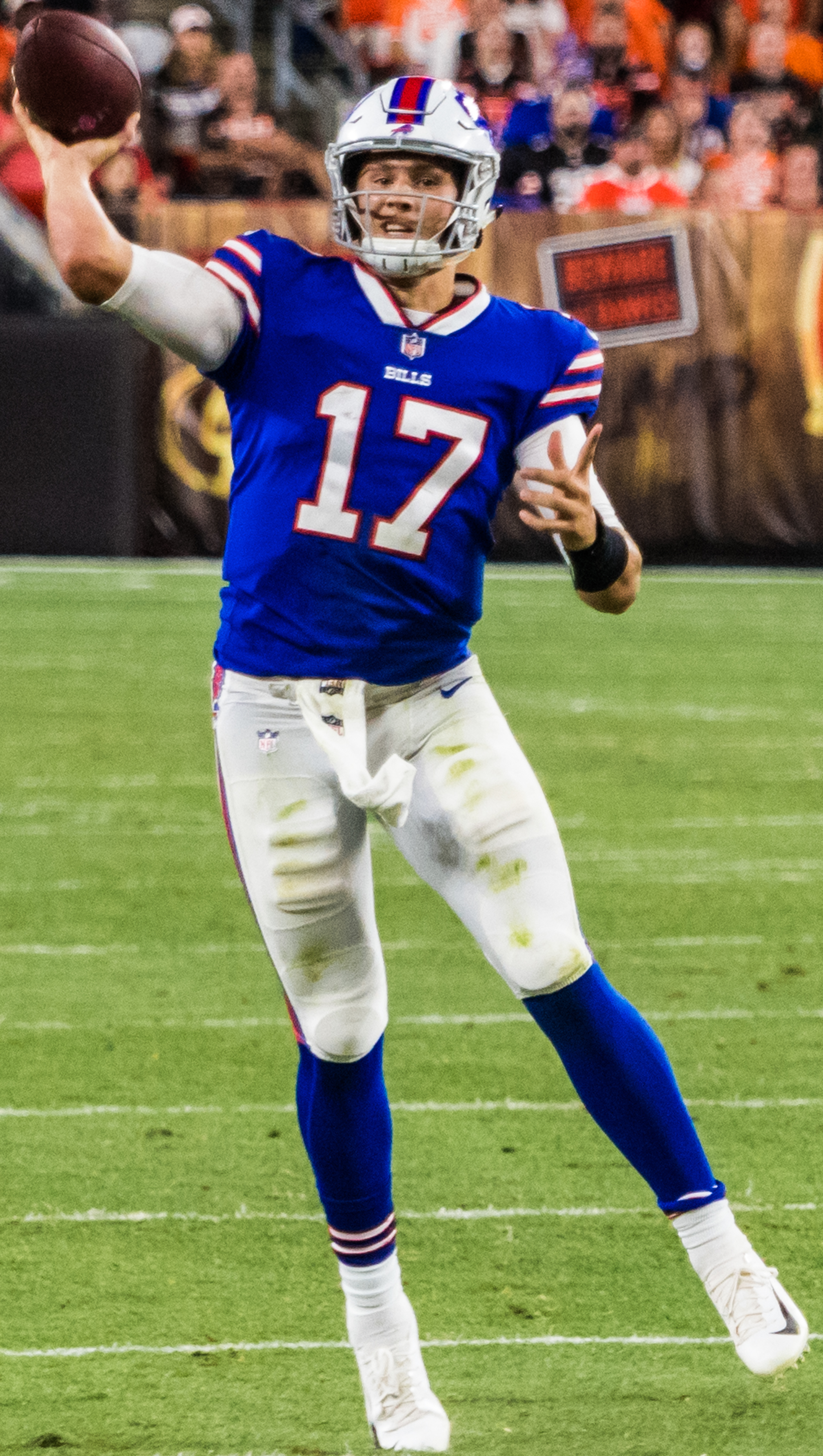
Josh Allen holds the Bills' records for single-season passing yards and touchdowns

The number of games they started during the season is listed to the right:

=== Regular season ===
Season(s)	Quarterback(s)
1960 (AFL)	Johnny Green (6) / Tommy O'Connell (5) / Richie Lucas (2) / Bob Brodhead (1)
1961 (AFL)	Johnny Green (5) / Warren Rabb (3) / M.C. Reynolds (3) / Richie Lucas (2) / Tommy O'Connell (1)
1962 (AFL)	Warren Rabb (7) / Al Dorow (4) / Jack Kemp (3)
1963 (AFL)	Jack Kemp (12) / Daryle Lamonica (2)
1964 (AFL)	Jack Kemp (13) / Daryle Lamonica (1)
1965 (AFL)	Jack Kemp (13) / Daryle Lamonica (1)
1966 (AFL)	Jack Kemp (14)
1967 (AFL)	Jack Kemp (11) / Tom Flores (3)
1968 (AFL)	Dan Darragh (7) / Ed Rutkowski (3) / Kay Stephenson (3) / Tom Flores (1)
1969 (AFL)	Jack Kemp (11) / Dan Darragh (2) / James Harris (1)
1970	Dennis Shaw (12) / Dan Darragh (2)
1971	Dennis Shaw (12) / James Harris (2)
1972	Dennis Shaw (13) / Leo Hart (1)
1973	Joe Ferguson (14)
1974	Joe Ferguson (14)
1975	Joe Ferguson (14)
1976	Joe Ferguson (7) / Gary Marangi (7)
1977	Joe Ferguson (14)
1978	Joe Ferguson (16)
1979	Joe Ferguson (16)
1980	Joe Ferguson (16)
1981	Joe Ferguson (16)
1982	Joe Ferguson (9)
1983	Joe Ferguson (16)
1984	Joe Ferguson (11) / Joe Dufek (5)
1985	Vince Ferragamo (9) / Bruce Mathison (7)
1986	Jim Kelly (16)
1987	Jim Kelly (12) / Brian McClure (1) / Willie Totten (1) / Dan Manucci (1)
1988	Jim Kelly (16)
1989	Jim Kelly (13) / Frank Reich (3)
1990	Jim Kelly (14) / Frank Reich (2)
1991	Jim Kelly (15) / Frank Reich (1)
1992	Jim Kelly (16)
1993	Jim Kelly (16)
1994	Jim Kelly (14) / Frank Reich (2)
1995	Jim Kelly (15) / Todd Collins (1)
1996	Jim Kelly (13) / Todd Collins (3)
1997	Todd Collins (13) / Alex Van Pelt (3)
1998	Doug Flutie (10) / Rob Johnson (6)
1999	Doug Flutie (15) / Rob Johnson (1)
2000	Rob Johnson (11) / Doug Flutie (5)
2001	Alex Van Pelt (8) / Rob Johnson (8)
2002	Drew Bledsoe (16)
2003	Drew Bledsoe (16)
2004	Drew Bledsoe (16)
2005	J. P. Losman (8) / Kelly Holcomb (8)
2006	J. P. Losman (16)
2007	Trent Edwards (9) / J. P. Losman (7)
2008	Trent Edwards (14) / J. P. Losman (2)
2009	Ryan Fitzpatrick (8) / Trent Edwards (7) / Brian Brohm (1)
2010	Ryan Fitzpatrick (13) / Trent Edwards (2) / Brian Brohm (1)
2011	Ryan Fitzpatrick (16)
2012	Ryan Fitzpatrick (16)
2013	EJ Manuel (10) / Thad Lewis (5) / Jeff Tuel (1)
2014	Kyle Orton (12) / EJ Manuel (4)
2015	Tyrod Taylor (13) / EJ Manuel (2) / Matt Cassel (1)
2016	Tyrod Taylor (15) / EJ Manuel (1)
2017	Tyrod Taylor (14) / Nathan Peterman (2)
2018	Josh Allen (11) / Nathan Peterman (2) / Derek Anderson (2) / Matt Barkley (1)
2019	Josh Allen (16)
2020	Josh Allen (16)
2021	Josh Allen (17)
2022	Josh Allen (16) (Note: Due to an injury involving Damar Hamlin, the Bills Week 17 game against the Cincinnati Bengals was canceled.)
2023	Josh Allen (17)
2024	Josh Allen (17)
2025	Josh Allen (17)
2026	Josh Allen (3)

=== Postseason ===
Season(s)	Quarterback(s)
1963 (AFL)	Jack Kemp (0–1)
1964 (AFL)	Jack Kemp (1–0)
1965 (AFL)	Jack Kemp (1–0)
1966 (AFL)	Jack Kemp (0–1)
1974	Joe Ferguson (0–1)
1980	Joe Ferguson (0–1)
1981	Joe Ferguson (1–1)
1988	Jim Kelly (1–1)
1989	Jim Kelly (0–1)
1990	Jim Kelly (2–1)
1991	Jim Kelly (2–1)
1992	Frank Reich (2–0)
1992	Jim Kelly (1–1)
1993	Jim Kelly (2–1)
1995	Jim Kelly (1–1)
1996	Jim Kelly (0–1)
1998	Doug Flutie (0–1)
1999	Rob Johnson (0–1)
2017	Tyrod Taylor (0–1)
2019	Josh Allen (0–1)
2020	Josh Allen (2–1)
2021	Josh Allen (1–1)
2022	Josh Allen (1–1)
2023	Josh Allen (1–1)
2024	Josh Allen (2–1)
2025	Josh Allen (1–1)

== Statistics ==
=== Most games started ===
These quarterbacks have the most starts for the Bills in regular season games (through the 2026 NFL season).

GP	Games played
GS	Games started
W	Number of wins as starting quarterback
L	Number of losses as starting quarterback
T	Number of ties as starting quarterback
%	Winning percentage as starting quarterback

Name	Period	GP	GS	W	L	T	%
Joe Ferguson	1973–1984	164	163	77	86	—	.472
Jim Kelly	1986–1996	160	160	101	59	—	.631
Josh Allen	2018–Present	130	129	90	39	—	.698
Jack Kemp	1962–1969	88	77	43	31	3	.578
Ryan Fitzpatrick	2009–2012	55	53	20	33	—	.377
Drew Bledsoe	2002–2004	48	48	23	25	—	.479
Tyrod Taylor	2015–2017	44	43	23	20	—	.535

=== Top ten passers in Bills history ===
This table lists the quarterbacks with the most passing yards while with the Bills
(Stats updated through the 2026 NFL regular season)

Comp	Number of passes completed
Att	Number of passes attempted
%	Percentage of passes completed
Yds	Total passing yards
TD	Number of passing touchdowns
Int	Number of interceptions thrown

Name	Comp	Att	%	Yds	TD	Int
Jim Kelly	2,874	4,779	60.1	35,467	237	175
Josh Allen	2,655	4,148	64.0	30,684	225	94
Joe Ferguson	2,188	4,166	52.5	27,590	181	190
Ryan Fitzpatrick	1,041	1,742	59.8	11,654	80	64
Jack Kemp	1,039	2,240	46.4	15,134	77	132
Drew Bledsoe	905	1,531	59.1	10,151	55	43
Tyrod Taylor	774	1,236	62.6	8,857	51	16
Doug Flutie	598	1,063	56.3	7,582	47	30
Dennis Shaw	485	916	52.9	6,286	35	67
J. P. Losman	558	941	59.3	6,211	33	34

== See also ==
- List of American Football League players
- Lists of NFL starting quarterbacks
