= List of South Carolina State Bulldogs in the NFL draft =

This is a list of South Carolina State Bulldogs football players in the NFL draft.

== Key ==
| B | Back | K | Kicker | NT | Nose tackle |
| C | Center | LB | Linebacker | FB | Fullback |
| DB | Defensive back | P | Punter | HB | Halfback |
| DE | Defensive end | QB | Quarterback | WR | Wide receiver |
| DT | Defensive tackle | RB | Running back | G | Guard |
| E | End | T | Offensive tackle | TE | Tight end |

== Selections ==
| Year | Round | Pick | Overall | Player | Team | Position |
|---|---|---|---|---|---|---|
| 1960 | 18 | 10 | 214 | Carl Robinson | San Francisco 49ers | T |
| 1966 | 10 | 6 | 88 | Fred Dawston | Kansas City Chiefs | DB |
| 1967 | 2 | 26 | 52 | John Gilliam | New Orleans Saints | WR |
| 1967 | 14 | 8 | 349 | Cleveland Robinson | Detroit Lions | DE |
| 1967 | 17 | 14 | 433 | John Gibbs | San Diego Chargers | B |
| 1968 | 4 | 5 | 88 | R. C. Gamble | Boston Patriots | RB |
| 1968 | 6 | 9 | 147 | Joe Wynns | Atlanta Falcons | DB |
| 1968 | 6 | 27 | 165 | James Johnson | Cincinnati Bengals | DB |
| 1968 | 7 | 16 | 181 | Willie Holman | Chicago Bears | DE |
| 1968 | 11 | 3 | 276 | Bennie Blocker | New Orleans Saints | RB |
| 1969 | 6 | 13 | 143 | Willie Grate | Houston Oilers | TE |
| 1970 | 5 | 4 | 108 | Cliff McClain | New York Jets | RB |
| 1970 | 6 | 25 | 155 | Clarence Kegler | Pittsburgh Steelers | T |
| 1970 | 14 | 16 | 354 | Tyrone Caldwell | San Diego Chargers | DT |
| 1971 | 8 | 1 | 183 | Louis Ross | Buffalo Bills | DE |
| 1971 | 13 | 8 | 320 | Al Young | Pittsburgh Steelers | WR |
| 1972 | 10 | 24 | 258 | Willie Aldridge | Minnesota Vikings | RB |
| 1972 | 14 | 1 | 339 | James Evans | New York Giants | LB |
| 1973 | 2 | 10 | 36 | Barney Chavous | Denver Broncos | DE |
| 1975 | 6 | 10 | 140 | Darius McCarthy | Los Angeles Rams | WR |
| 1975 | 10 | 9 | 243 | Donnie Layton | San Francisco 49ers | RB |
| 1976 | 4 | 13 | 105 | Harry Carson | New York Giants | LB |
| 1977 | 4 | 26 | 110 | Mickey Sims | Cleveland Browns | DT |
| 1978 | 3 | 15 | 71 | Rickey Anderson | San Diego Chargers | RB |
| 1978 | 12 | 13 | 319 | Anthony Clay | St. Louis Cardinals | LB |
| 1980 | 3 | 26 | 82 | Phil Murphy | Los Angeles Rams | DT |
| 1980 | 4 | 10 | 93 | Ervin Parker | Buffalo Bills | LB |
| 1980 | 5 | 25 | 135 | Nate Rivers | Philadelphia Eagles | RB |
| 1981 | 3 | 27 | 83 | Robert Geathers | Buffalo Bills | DT |
| 1981 | 5 | 3 | 114 | Edwin Bailey | Seattle Seahawks | G |
| 1981 | 8 | 8 | 201 | Charlie Brown | Washington Redskins | WR |
| 1981 | 8 | 15 | 208 | William Judson | Miami Dolphins | DB |
| 1981 | 12 | 14 | 318 | John Alford | Miami Dolphins | DT |
| 1982 | 6 | 22 | 161 | Tom Tutson | Miami Dolphins | DB |
| 1982 | 11 | 13 | 292 | Edward Lee | Detroit Lions | WR |
| 1983 | 8 | 3 | 199 | Henry Odom | Pittsburgh Steelers | RB |
| 1983 | 10 | 27 | 278 | Anthony Reed | Miami Dolphins | RB |
| 1983 | 11 | 5 | 284 | Dwayne Jackson | Kansas City Chiefs | DE |
| 1984 | 5 | 7 | 119 | Barney Bussey | Cincinnati Bengals | DB |
| 1984 | 10 | 5 | 257 | Heyward Golden | New York Giants | DB |
| 1985 | 8 | 24 | 220 | Leonard Wingate | Los Angeles Raiders | DT |
| 1988 | 8 | 22 | 215 | Robert Tyler | Seattle Seahawks | TE |
| 1988 | 11 | 22 | 299 | Dwayne Harper | Seattle Seahawks | DB |
| 1989 | 12 | 7 | 314 | William DuBose | Indianapolis Colts | RB |
| 1992 | 1 | 26 | 26 | Robert Porcher | Detroit Lions | DE |
| 1995 | 2 | 3 | 35 | Anthony Cook | Houston Oilers | DE |
| 1996 | 7 | 44 | 253 | Michael Hicks | Chicago Bears | RB |
| 1997 | 4 | 13 | 109 | Raleigh Roundtree | San Diego Chargers | G |
| 1997 | 5 | 8 | 138 | Kenny Bynum | San Diego Chargers | RB |
| 2000 | 7 | 42 | 248 | Lewis Kelly | Minnesota Vikings | T |
| 2001 | 6 | 17 | 180 | Arther Love | New England Patriots | TE |
| 2010 | 7 | 17 | 224 | Phillip Adams | San Francisco 49ers | DB |
| 2011 | 7 | 6 | 209 | Johnny Culbreath | Detroit Lions | T |
| 2012 | 4 | 35 | 130 | Christian Thompson | Baltimore Ravens | DB |
| 2016 | 3 | 26 | 89 | Javon Hargrave | Pittsburgh Steelers | DT |
| 2016 | 6 | 2 | 177 | Temarrick Hemingway | Los Angeles Rams | TE |
| 2018 | 2 | 4 | 36 | Shaquille Leonard | Indianapolis Colts | LB |
| 2022 | 4 | 37 | 142 | Cobie Durant | Los Angeles Rams | DB |
