= Bobby Hunt (American football) =

American football player (1940–2026)

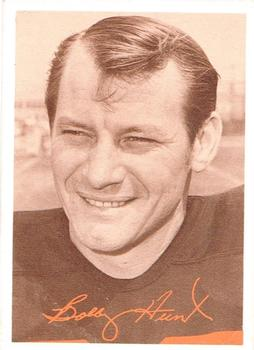
- Hunt in 1969

No. 20
- Position: Safety

Personal information
- Born: August 15, 1940; Lanett, Alabama, U.S.
- Died: July 2026 (aged 85)

Career information
- College: Auburn
- AFL draft: 1962: 11th round, 81st overall pick

Career history
- Dallas Texans/Kansas City Chiefs (1962–1967); Cincinnati Bengals (1968–1969)

Awards and highlights
- 2× AFL champion (1962, 1966); First-team All-AFL (1962); AFL All-Star (1964); Second-team All-SEC (1959); AFL record: Most passes intercepted in a single game: 4 (tied)

Career statistics
- Games played: 112
- Interceptions: 42
- Touchdowns: 1
- Stats at Pro Football Reference

Robert Kenneth Hunt (August 15, 1940 – July 2026) was an American professional football player who was a defensive back in the American Football League (AFL). He played college football as a quarterback and defensive back for the Auburn Tigers. He was selected by the Dallas Texans in the 1962 AFL draft and went on to play in the AFL for the Texans, Kansas City Chiefs, and the Cincinnati Bengals between 1962 and 1969.

Hunt was first-team All-AFL his rookie year with the Texans. He had eight interceptions, setting a franchise rookie record for interceptions in a 14-game season. In 1964, he intercepted four passes in a single game against George Blanda and the Houston Oilers, returning one for a touchdown. He is tied for the NFL/AFL record for most interceptions in a game. Hunt had ten interceptions in 1966 and during his eight-year career he had 42, returning them for 755 yards and a touchdown. He was second-team All-AFL in 1964 and 1966, and was selected to play in the AFL All-Star game in 1964. He was an AFL Champion with the Texans and Chiefs in 1962 and in 1967 (1966 AFL season), when he played for them in the first AFL-NFL World Championship game. After his playing career he was an assistant coach with the Buffalo Bills for two seasons. Hunt is a member of the Alabama Sports Hall of Fame class of 2015.

== Early life ==
Hunt was born in Lanett, Alabama, on August 15, 1940. He attended Lanett High School, where he played quarterback and defensive back on the school's football team. In 1957, the Montgomery Advertiser-Journal named the reportedly 6 ft 3 in (1.91 m) 185 lb (83.9 kg) Hunt first-team All-State at quarterback as a senior. He also was the team's punter and returned punts for Lanett, including an 85-yard touchdown return in a mid-September 1957 game.

Hunt helped lead his team to two undefeated seasons. He was also named to the All-Southern team. Hunt's high school football coach Mal Morgan worked with Hunt to develop a physical conditioning program to keep Hunt in prime physical condition during his high school years.

As a senior in 1957–58, he led the school's basketball team, playing in the Class AA 4th District. He was named to the all-senior and all-tournament teams in basketball that season.

== College career ==
Hunt attended Auburn University. He was a two-way player at defensive back and quarterback on the Auburn Tigers football team, playing in the Southeastern Conference (SEC). Hunt kept himself in good physical condition all year round, so he could always be playing football in top shape. Just before his junior season, the reportedly 6 ft 1 in (1.85 m) 180 lb (81.6 kg) Hunt said "I don't believe any football player can give all he's got to the game unless he's in perfect physical shape . . . It's a hard enough struggle to outdo boys who are at least your equal without taking on the burden of being out of shape".

He played quarterback on the freshman team in 1958. He played varsity quarterback for the Tigers from 1959 to 1961. As a sophomore in 1959, he had 240 passing yards with one passing touchdown. Hunt rushed for 552 yards and seven touchdowns. His 5.6 yards per carry average led the SEC. Hunt led the 1959 Tigers in passing yards, rushing yards, and scoring. In a November 1959 game against Mississippi State University, Hunt rushed for 214 or 216 yards on 16 carries, with touchdown runs of 42 and 51 yards. He was the SEC's sophomore of the year in 1959. United Press International (UPI) selected Hunt second-team All-SEC in 1959. The Associated Press (AP) selected Hunt third-team All-SEC in 1959.

As a junior (1960), he was backup to Bryant Harvard at quarterback. Hunt passed for 242 yards, with two passing touchdowns; and rushed for 147 yards on 78 carries, with one touchdown. Hunt was Auburn's starting quarterback as a senior (1961), passing for a team-leading 703 yards, with two touchdowns and eight interceptions. He rushed for 347 yards on 101 carries, with six rushing touchdowns; leading Auburn in scoring. He was fifth in the SEC in scoring and sixth in passing yards. On defense, he was one of the SEC's interception leaders in 1961. UPI named Hunt third-team All-SEC in 1961.

Hunt quarterbacked the South to a 9–7 victory in the 1961 Blue-Gray Game. Hunt was named the game's outstanding player. He was also selected to play quarterback in the U.S. Bowl in early January 1962; and was excellent as a defensive player in that game.

== Professional career ==
=== Dallas Texans/Kansas City Chiefs ===
The Dallas Texans drafted Hunt in the 11th round of the 1962 AFL draft, 81st overall. The franchise played the 1962 season in Dallas, and then moved to Kansas City before the 1963 season, becoming the Kansas City Chiefs.

As a rookie in 1962, Hunt started all 14 games for the Texans, at strong safety. He had a team-leading eight interceptions, tied for third most in the AFL that season. He also had ½ quarterback sack that season. Hunt's eight interceptions were a franchise rookie record, that was tied in 2015 by Marcus Peters during a 16-game season (Peters eighth interception coming in the season's 15th game). Hunt was named first-team All-AFL by the Associated Press (AP) and United Press International (UPI). He was second by one vote to teammate Curtis McClinton for the AP's AFL Rookie of the Year. He was also second in Pro Football Illustrated's AFL Rookie of the Year voting, to Tom Sestak, and was named to its defensive all-rookie team that season. The Texans won the AFL Championship Game, 20–17, in a double overtime victory over the Houston Oilers, with Hunt starting at strong safety.

In 1963, Hunt started 11 games at strong safety for the Chiefs, with a team-leading six interceptions which he returned for a total of 228 yards. He tied for sixth in the AFL in interceptions, and was second in interception return yards. He did not start until the season's fourth game against the Oilers, when he replaced Bobby Ply who suffered a broken nose after colliding with Hunt in practice (his second broken nose of the season and fifth of his career). Hunt intercepted a George Blanda pass and returned it 53 yards in that game. He had two interceptions in an early December game against the Denver Broncos, one of which he returned 65 or 66 yards to the Broncos' one-yard line.

In 1964, Hunt started all 14 games at strong safety for the Chiefs. He tied Dave Grayson for the team lead with seven interceptions; tying for sixth best in the AFL that season. The best game of Hunt's career occurred on October 4, 1964, when he intercepted four passes in a game against Blanda and the Oilers, including one he returned 29 yards for a touchdown. He is tied with 19 other players for the NFL/AFL record for most interceptions in a game (through 2025). He was selected to play in the AFL All-Star Game that season, and the Associated Press named him second-team All-AFL.

In 1965, he again started all 14 games at strong safety, with one interception. In 1966, he had a career-high 10 interceptions, starting all 14 games at strong safety. He tied teammate, and future Hall of Fame free safety, Johnny Robinson for the AFL lead in interceptions that season. The AFL, Associated Press and Newspaper Enterprise Association each named Hunt second-team All-AFL. The Chiefs defeated the Buffalo Bills, 31–7, in the 1966 AFL Championship Game. Hunt recovered a fumble against the Bills, and returned it 21 or 24 yards. The Chiefs played in the first AFL-NFL World Championship Game, later officially known as the Super Bowl, losing to the Green Bay Packers, 35–10.

1967 was Hunt's final season with the Chiefs. He started all 14 games at strong safety, with five interceptions. The Chiefs left Hunt exposed to the January 1968 expansion draft, and he was selected by the Cincinnati Bengals.

=== Cincinnati Bengals ===
Hunt became the expansion Bengals starting free safety in 1968 and 1969. In 1968, he started 13 games with one interception and one fumble recovery. He also had a quarterback sack that season. In his final season (1969), he started all 14 games, with four interceptions and one fumble recovery. He retired at the end of the 1969 season.

During his eight year AFL career, Hunt never missed a game, and started in 108 games of the 112 regular season games in which he appeared. He had 42 interceptions that he returned for 755 yards, along with two fumble recoveries and 1.5 quarterback sacks.

== Coaching career ==
After his playing career, Hunt was a defensive backs coach with the Buffalo Bills for two seasons (1970 and 1971). After having retired less than one year before becoming a coach, the transition to his new role was originally difficult, but became easier over time. The Bills finished the 1970 season allowing the fifth fewest passing yards in the NFL and second fewest in the American Football Conference. They ranked third best in lowest pass completion percentage against the defense. In 1971, they ranked 11th in passing yards and 16th in completion percentage. They had a 3–10–1 record in 1970 under coach John Rauch, and were 1–13 in 1971 under coach Harvey Johnson. The Bills hired Lou Saban in December 1971 as their new head coach, and Saban replaced all of the team's assistant coaches, including Hunt.

== Legacy and honors ==
In 2014, Hunt was elected to the Alabama Sports Hall of Fame as a member of the Class of 2015. In 1962, Hunt was honored by the Lanett Quarterback Club.

== Personal life and death ==
After the end of the school year in college, the 19-year old Hunt worked in Lanett's recreation department and coached little league baseball. He also played amateur baseball, as a catcher. After his career as a player and coach ended, he worked for the Haggar Apparel Company, and later retired to Charlotte, North Carolina.

Hunt died in July 2026, at the age of 85.

== See also ==
- Other American Football League Players
