= Harvey Johnson (coach) =

American football player and coach (1919–1983)

No. 75, 61, 88, 62, 76
- Positions: Placekicker, fullback

Personal information
- Born: June 22, 1919; Bridgeton, New Jersey, U.S.
- Died: August 8, 1983 (aged 64); Bridgeton, New Jersey, U.S.
- Listed height: 5 ft 11 in (1.80 m)
- Listed weight: 212 lb (96 kg)

Career information
- High school: Bridgeton; Staunton Military Academy (Staunton, Virginia)
- College: William & Mary (1939–1942)
- NFL draft: 1943: 6th round, 43rd overall pick

Career history

Playing
- New York Yankees (1946–1949); New York Yanks (1951)

Coaching
- Hamilton Tiger-Cats (1953) Backfield coach; Kitchener-Waterloo Dutchmen (1954–1957) Head coach; Montreal Alouettes (1958–1959) Assistant coach; Buffalo Bills (1960–1961) Defensive backfield/kickers coach; Buffalo Bills (1968) Interim head coach; Buffalo Bills (1971) Head coach

Awards and highlights
- 2× First-team All-SoCon (1941, 1942); AAFC records: Most consecutive PAT conversions without a miss (102)

Career NFL/AAFC statistics
- Field goals made: 28
- Field goal attempts: 52
- Field goal %: 53.8
- Stats at Pro Football Reference

Head coaching record
- Career: AFL: 1–10–1 (.125); NFL: 1–13 (.071)
- Coaching profile at Pro Football Reference

Harvey Paul "Stud" Johnson (June 22, 1919 – August 8, 1983) was an American football player and coach. He served two separate stints as the head coach for the Buffalo Bills, first in the American Football League (AFL) and then in the National Football League (NFL).

== Early life ==
Born and raised in Bridgeton, New Jersey, Johnson attended Bridgeton High School and Staunton Military Academy

== Playing career ==
Johnson played fullback at William & Mary and was named to the All-Southern Conference football team in 1941 and 1942. He was a member of the United States Navy during World War II and played for the 1944 Bainbridge Commodores football team.

Johnson was the placekicker for the New York Yankees of the All-America Football Conference (AAFC) from 1946 to 1949 and the New York Yanks of the National Football League in 1951. On November 24, 1949, Johnson set the AAFC record for most consecutive PAT conversions without a miss with 100.

== Coaching ==
Johnson began his coaching career in 1953 as backfield coach for the Hamilton Tiger-Cats. The following year, he became the head coach and general manager of the Kitchener-Waterloo Dutchmen. He led team to four Ontario Rugby Football Union championships in his four years with the team. He left after the 1957 season to become the chief scout of the Montreal Alouettes.

After eight years as an assistant coach and then defensive coordinator with the Buffalo Bills, Johnson first took the reins as head coach in 1968, when Joe Collier was fired two games into the season. The Bills went 1–10–1 with Johnson at the helm, and he was replaced the following year by John Rauch. Johnson returned to his role as the Bills' defensive backfield coach for two seasons before resuming the head coaching post in 1971. After finishing with a 1–13 record that year, Johnson was reassigned to the scouting department. He compiled a record of 2–23–1 in his two seasons. Johnson was also on the Buffalo Bills coaching staff when the Bills won the 1965 AFL Championship game. Johnson continued to work as a scout for the team until his death in 1983.

It was speculated that Johnson's love of thoroughbred horse racing, a passion he shared with owner Ralph Wilson, allowed him to stay on the Bills payroll despite his poor performance in coaching.

== Head coaching record ==
Team	Year	Regular season					Postseason			
Team	Year	Won	Lost	Ties	Win %	Finish	Won	Lost	Win %	Result
BUF	1968	1	10	1	.125	5th in AFL Eastern	–	–	–	–
BUF	1971	1	13	0	.071	5th in AFC East	–	–	–	–
Total		2	23	1	.096		–	–	–	–
