= Haven Moses =

American football player (born 1946)

No. 25
- Position: Wide receiver

Personal information
- Born: July 27, 1946 (age 80); Los Angeles, California, U.S.
- Listed height: 6 ft 2 in (1.88 m)
- Listed weight: 208 lb (94 kg)

Career information
- High school: Fermin Lasuen (Los Angeles)
- College: Los Angeles Harbor (1964–1965); San Diego State (1966–1967)
- NFL draft: 1968: 1st round, 9th overall pick

Career history
- Buffalo Bills (1968–1972); Denver Broncos (1972–1981)

Awards and highlights
- Pro Bowl (1973); AFL All-Star (1969); Denver Broncos Ring of Fame; First-team Little All-American (1967); San Diego State Aztecs No. 25 retired

Career NFL/AFL statistics
- Receptions: 448
- Receiving yards: 8,091
- Receiving touchdowns: 56
- Stats at Pro Football Reference

Haven Christopher Moses (born July 27, 1946) is an American former professional football player who was a wide receiver for 14 seasons in the American Football League (AFL) and National Football League (NFL) with the Buffalo Bills and Denver Broncos. He holds the Broncos franchise career record for yards per reception (18.0).

He played two years of college football for Los Angeles Harbor College, where he was a junior college second-team All-American. He played his final two college years with the San Diego State Aztecs, under coach Don Coryell, during which time the team was 21–1, and where Moses was named a Little All-American as a senior receiver.

== Early life ==
Moses was born on July 27, 1946, in Los Angeles. He attended Fermin Lasuen High School, a Catholic all-boys school in San Pedro, California, which had 400 students. He played on the football and basketball teams for the Padres, who competed in the Camino Real League. He was a two-way player on the football team, at halfback and defensive back. Moses weighed 170 lb (77.1 kg) as a senior in 1963. As a junior in 1962, Moses helped Fermin Lasuen's football team to a 12-0 record, a Camino Real League title and the CIF Southern Section 2-A Division championship, and then was named an All-Camino Real League back as a senior in 1963, leading the Padres to the 3-A Division quarterfinal with a 9-2 record and a second straight Camino Real League title.

== College career ==
After high school, Moses initially played junior college football at Los Angeles Harbor College, in 1964 and 1965. He was a two-way player at safety and halfback. The team was 9–0 in 1964, and won the Western State Conference (WSC) title. Moses led the team in interceptions and punt returning. He was unanimously selected as a first-team WSC All-Star at defensive back (safety) in 1964; and was named a second-team junior college All-American by J. C. Grid Wire.

In a late September 1965 game, Moses had a 40-yard touchdown reception and 90-yard touchdown on a kickoff return, in Harbor's 11th consecutive win. Two weeks later he had a 73-yard touchdown reception. In 1965, Moses was named a Grid-Wire All-American as a defensive specialist, at defensive back. He was selected both first-team All-WSC on offense as an end, and second-team All-WSC as a defensive back. He was also named Harbor's most valuable player and a team captain.

Moses then transferred to San Diego State University. He played football for the Aztecs under future Hall of Fame head coach Don Coryell, from 1966 to 1967. As a 6 ft 3 in (1.90 m) 196 lb (88.9 kg) flanker in 1966, Moses had eight regular season, and ten total, receiving touchdowns, with 62 receptions for 1,201 yards. San Diego State was 11–0 in 1966, and was the National Collegiate Athletic Association (NCAA) small college champion. The Aztecs won the 1966 Camellia Bowl, 28–7, over Montana State. Moses had two touchdown receptions in that game.

In 1967, San Diego State was the NCAA small college champion for a second straight season. The Aztecs won their first nine consecutive games that season, making 25 consecutive wins over three years, until being defeated by major college Utah State, 31–25. The Aztecs played San Francisco State in the December 9 Camellia Bowl, winning 27–6. The NCAA declared seven Aztec players ineligible before the Camellia Bowl, and Moses had to play defensive back for the first time in his San Diego State career (as well as flanker). Coryell commended Moses for his fine job on defense in the game. During the season, in addition to playing as a receiver, Moses rushed the ball at least 10 times, and played on special teams covering punts.

Moses was selected as a Little College All-American at receiver in 1967. After his senior season, Moses played in the 1967 East-West Shrine Game, the Chicago College All-Star Game and the Senior Bowl.

== Professional career ==
=== Buffalo Bills ===
Moses was selected ninth overall in the first round of the 1968 NFL/AFL draft by the Buffalo Bills of the AFL. Moses was knocked unconscious by a right forearm thrown during a tackle by defensive back Erich Barnes during a late August 1968 preseason game against the Cleveland Browns; and yet held onto the pass reception (his fourth of the game). He was taken off the field on a stretcher. As a rookie in 1968, he started all 14 games at flanker, with 42 receptions for 633 yards and two touchdowns. His 55-yard touchdown pass reception against the New York Jets was the Bills longest receptions of the season.

In 1969, Moses started all 14 Bills' game as a wide receiver. He had 39 receptions for 752 yards and five touchdowns. His touchdown passes included receptions of 55 (tied with O. J. Simpson for the Bills' season longest reception), 45 and 39 yards. He had two touchdowns in a November 23 game against the Boston Patriots. His 19.3 yards per reception was seventh best in the AFL. Moses was selected to play in the AFL All-Star Game.

He started 14 games for the third consecutive season in 1970, with 39 receptions for 726 yards and two touchdowns. In this first year of the AFL-NFL merger, he was tied for 10th in the now 26-team NFL, with 18.6 yards per reception. In 1971, Moses started nine games, with 23 receptions for 470 yards (20.4 yards per reception) and two touchdowns. He had a 73-yard touchdown reception in the first quarter of the first game of the season against the Dallas Cowboys. He had six receptions for 151 yards against the New York Jets in the fifth game of the season. He suffered a sprained left ankle during a November 14 game, limiting his play for the rest of the season; not recording a reception again until the 13th game of the season on December 12.

In 1972, Moses appeared in only five games for the Bills, without a start and with only three receptions. The Bills new coach Lou Saban had a run oriented offense, and he did not believe Moses was an adequate blocker under this new scheme and did not start Moses. (The BIlls were sixth in the league in rushing yards in 1972, and 24th in passing yards.) Moses was traded in mid-October to the Denver Broncos for wide receiver Dwight Harrison. (Harrison never started a game at receiver for the Bills, but became the team's starting right cornerback on defense for five years.)

In his four full Bills' seasons (1968 to 1971), Moses started 51 games with 143 receptions for 2,581 yards (18 yards per reception) and 12 touchdowns.

=== Denver Broncos ===
After the trade, Moses finished the season with the Broncos and then played with them for another nine years. He started six games for the Broncos in 1972, with five touchdown receptions. Overall he caught 15 passes for 224 yards. In a December 10 game against the San Diego Chargers he had two touchdown receptions and made several key blocks in the game, and was awarded the Broncos' game ball for his performance that day. The Broncos had a 2–6 record when head coach John Ralston made Moses a starter in the ninth game of the season, and then for the Broncos' remaining five games. Over those six games, the Broncos were 3–3. He particularly appreciated the opportunity to play with a knowledgeable veteran quarterback in the Broncos' Charley Johnson.

In 1973, the Broncos had their first winning season in team history (7–5–2). Moses started all 14 games at wide receiver. He had 28 receptions for 518 yards, and his 18.5 yards per catch was fifth best in the NFL. He also had a team-leading and career-high eight touchdown receptions, and was selected to his first NFL Pro Bowl. He had three touchdown receptions in an October 14 game against the Houston Oilers, and a 76-yard touchdown reception against the New York Jets two weeks later. In a late November game against the Kansas City Chiefs, he had touchdown receptions of 18 and 40 yards.

Moses started 13 games in 1974, and led the Broncos with a 16.4 yards per catch average on 34 receptions; two for touchdowns. The Broncos again had a winning season (7–6–1). In 1975, the Broncos had their only losing season during the remainder of Moses's career. He started every game and again led the team with a 17.4 yards per catch average; with 29 receptions and two touchdowns. In 1976, the Broncos achieved the best record in team history (9–5). Moses started all 14 games, averaging nearly 20 yards per reception on 25 catches. He led the Broncos with seven receiving touchdowns. He had a 71-yard touchdown reception in an early November game against the Tampa Bay Buccaneers.

He was a key member of the 1977 Broncos team that reached the Super Bowl. The Broncos were 12–2 and finished first in the AFC West Division. Moses again started all 14 games, averaging 20 yards per catch (fourth best in the NFL) on 27 receptions, four for touchdowns. The Broncos defeated the Pittsburgh Steelers in the divisional round of the playoffs, 34–21. Moses had two receptions for 45 yards. The Broncos then beat the Oakland Raiders, 20–17, in the January 1, 1978 AFC championship game. Moses played a critical role in the victory with two receiving touchdowns, including a 74-yard touchdown reception in the first quarter. Moses considered this game the highlight of his life up to that point in time. The Dallas Cowboys defeated the Broncos, 27–10, in Super Bowl XII. Moses had one reception for 21 yards in that game.

The Broncos again were first in the AFC West Division in 1978, with a 10–6 record, Moses starting all 16 games. He averaged 20.1 yards per reception on 37 receptions, with five touchdowns. He led the Broncos in yards per reception and was tied for fifth in the NFL. Moses had two receptions in the Broncos' first round playoff loss to the Steelers that season. The following season (1979), Moses had career-highs of 54 receptions and 943 receiving yards, along with six touchdowns. He again led the Broncos with 17.5 yards per reception. He had three receptions in the Broncos' first round playoff loss to the Houston Oilers, 13–7.

The 34-year old Moses started 14 games in 1980, with 38 receptions for 674 yards and four touchdowns. He led the Broncos in receiving yards and yards per reception (17.7). His 17.7 yards per reception was tied for ninth best in the NFL. Moses started six games in his final season (1981), with 15 receptions for 246 yards and one touchdown.

Moses played in 10 seasons for the Broncos, starting 127 games. He had 302 receptions for 5,450 yards (18.0 yards per reception), with 44 touchdown receptions. Over his entire career, Moses had 448 regular season receptions for 8,091 (18.1 yards per reception), with 56 touchdowns. Moses had 13 receptions in five playoff games during his career. In the 1977-78 NFL playoffs, Moses led the NFL with the most receiving yards (234), yards per reception (29.3) and longest reception (74 yards).

== Legacy and honors ==
In 1970, Moses selected as a member of the Buffalo Bills team of the 1960s. Moses was inducted into the Denver Broncos Ring of Fame in 1988, and is on the Ring of Fame wall at Empower Field at Mile High. He was a 1986 inductee to the Colorado Sports Hall of Fame. In 1988, he also was inducted into the San Diego State University Hall of Fame.

The Broncos only had one losing season from 1973 to 1981. From 1973 to 1980, Moses only missed starting three games. At the time he retired, Moses was tied for first in Broncos' history with 44 touchdown receptions (tied for fifth through 2025) and was third with 302 receptions (12th highest through 2025) and 5,450 receiving yards (10th highest through 2025). His 18.0 yards-per-reception average is the highest in franchise history for receivers with more than 100 receptions. He is tied with Owen Daniels and Clarence Kay for the Broncos' record for receiving touchdowns in a playoff game, with two against the Oakland Raiders on January 1, 1978.

== NFL/AFL career statistics ==
Legend
	Led the league
**Bold**	Career high

=== Regular season ===
Year	Team	Games		Receiving				
Year	Team	GP	GS	Rec	Yds	Avg	Lng	TD
1968	BUF	14	14	42	633	15.1	55	2
1969	BUF	14	14	39	752	19.3	55	5
1970	BUF	14	14	39	726	18.6	45	2
1971	BUF	12	9	23	470	**20.4**	73	2
1972	BUF	5	0	3	60	20.0	25	1
1972	DEN	8	6	15	224	14.9	33	5
1973	DEN	14	14	28	518	18.5	**76**	**8**
1974	DEN	13	13	34	559	16.4	42	2
1975	DEN	14	14	29	505	17.4	42	2
1976	DEN	14	14	25	498	19.9	71	7
1977	DEN	14	14	27	539	20.0	35	4
1978	DEN	16	16	37	744	20.1	42	5
1979	DEN	16	16	**54**	**943**	17.5	64	6
1980	DEN	15	14	38	674	17.7	33	4
1981	DEN	16	6	15	246	16.4	30	1
		199	178	448	8,091	18.1	76	56

=== Regular season ===
Year	Team	Games		Receiving				
Year	Team	GP	GS	Rec	Yds	Avg	Lng	TD
1977	DEN	3	3	**8**	**234**	**29.3**	**74**	**2**
1978	DEN	1	1	2	33	16.5	19	0
1979	DEN	1	1	3	47	15.7	25	0
		5	5	13	314	24.2	74	2

== Personal life ==
In his last four years as a player, in the offseason he worked for Samsonite, the international luggage company headquartered in Denver.

After the 1981 season, Moses retired from the NFL in March at age 35 and went to work for Adolph Coors Company in the community affairs division. He spent 15 years with Coors, seven with the Archdiocese of Denver, and five with the Denver Health Foundation. He also worked as a color commentator on ACC football games for Jefferson-Pilot Sports with play-by-play announcer Mike Patrick in 1985.

== See also ==
- List of American Football League players
