= Dan Darragh =

American football player (1946–2025)

No. 10
- Position: Quarterback

Personal information
- Born: November 28, 1946; Pittsburgh, Pennsylvania, U.S.
- Died: September 2, 2025 (aged 78)
- Listed height: 6 ft 3 in (1.91 m)
- Listed weight: 196 lb (89 kg)

Career information
- High school: South Hills Catholic (Mt. Lebanon, Pennsylvania)
- College: William & Mary (1964-1967)
- NFL draft: 1968: 13th round, 336th overall pick

Career history
- Buffalo Bills (1968–1970)

Awards and highlights
- William & Mary Athletics Hall of Fame

Career NFL/AFL statistics
- Passing attempts: 296
- Passing completions: 127
- Completion percentage: 42.9%
- TD–INT: 4–22
- Passing yards: 1,353
- Passer rating: 30.4
- Stats at Pro Football Reference

Daniel Meyer Darragh (November 28, 1946 – September 2, 2025) was an American professional football player who was a quarterback for the Buffalo Bills in the American Football League (AFL) and National Football League (NFL). He played college football for the William & Mary Tribe. Darragh played for the Bills in the AFL from 1968 through 1969 and in the NFL in 1970. He shared the starting job with Ed Rutkowski, Kay Stephenson and Tom Flores in 1968 while long-time starter and former AFL MVP Jack Kemp was out with an injury. After retiring, he became a practicing attorney focusing on environmental issues in Pittsburgh.

== College career ==
Darragh played college football for William & Mary under head coach Marv Levy (years later, Levy would coach the Buffalo Bills). In 1965, Darragh plated in 10 games for William & Mary, passing for 8 touchdown passes, 896 yards and 7 interceptions, and two rushing touchdowns. The Tribe finished with a 6–4 record overall, 5–1 in the Southern Conference. The next season, the Tribe's record slip to 5–4–1 overall, 4–1–1 in conference. The Tribe became more a pass first offense, with Darragh throwing the ball for 1,346 yards, first time he'd eclipsed the 1,000-yard passing mark in his career. In Darragh's senior season, William & Mary continued to struggle, but on November 11th, 1967, they played West Virginia to a 16–16 tie, handing the Mountaineers the only blemish on their conference record.

== Professional career ==
In 1968, the Bills selected Darragh in the 13th round of the NFL draft. The Bills starter the previous season, Jack Kemp was slated to miss the entire 1968 season. The Bills had hold overs Tom Flores, Ed Rutkowski and the nearly acquired Kay Stephenson at quarterback. Darragh won the starting position out of training camp. The season started with a 16–7 home loss against the Boston Patriots. The Bills then dropped their next two games to Oakland Raiders and Cincinnati Bengals before a 37–35 home win over the New York Jets. The highlight of the game was Bills defensive back Tom Janik picking off a Joe Namath pass and returning it 100 yards for a touchdown. As for Darragh, he only completed eight passes and threw an interception, but he had his first win in the pros as a starting quarterback. It would be the only win for the Bills that season, as they finished 1–12–1. for the season.

Jack Kemp returned for the 1969 season, and Darragh was exiled to the role of back-up. Under new head coach John Rauch, the Bills improved to 4–10. Darragh played in three games, starting in two of them as the season drew to a close. The Bills lost both of Darragh's starts that season, first to the Kansas City Chiefs and then to the Jets. Darragh suffered a season ending separated right shoulder against the Jets. In the 1970 draft, the Bills selected Dennis Shaw out of San Diego State as their quarterback of the future. Jack Kemp had since decided to retire from pro football. Darragh also had more competition for the quarterback position, James Harris, who was one of the first African American quarterbacks to play in the modern era. While Shaw was assigned to hold a clipboard for the first few weeks as Darragh started. The Bills lost both games, to the Denver Broncos and Los Angeles Rams respectively. His last appearance in an NFL game would occur on October 11, 1970, appearing in a relief role in the Bills 23–10 loss to the Pittsburgh Steelers. Darragh was released by the Bills at the end of training camp in 1971, ending his NFL career. Darragh finished with a 1–10 record as a starting quarterback.

In 1992, William & Mary inducted Darragh into the school's Hall of Fame.

== Personal life and death ==
Darragh earned a law degree from Duquesne University in 1975. He died on September 2, 2025, at the age of 78.

== See also ==
- List of American Football League players
