= Bob Kalsu =

American football player and US Army officer (1945–1970)

- Born: James Robert Kalsu; April 13, 1945; Oklahoma City, Oklahoma, U.S.
- Died: July 21, 1970 (aged 25); FSB Ripcord, Thua Thien, South Vietnam
- Military career
- Allegiance: United States of America
- Branch: United States Army
- Service years: 1968–1970
- Rank: First lieutenant
- Unit: 101st Airborne Division
- Conflicts: Vietnam War: Battle of Fire Support Base Ripcord †
- Awards: Bronze Star; Purple Heart
- Football career

No. 61
- Position: Guard

Personal information
- Listed height: 6 ft 3 in (1.91 m)
- Listed weight: 235 lb (107 kg)

Career information
- High school: Del City (Del City, Oklahoma)
- College: Oklahoma
- NFL draft: 1968: 8th round, 199th overall pick

Career history
- Buffalo Bills (1968)

Awards and highlights
- Buffalo Bills Wall of Fame; First-team All-American (1967); First-team All-Big Eight (1967)
- Stats at Pro Football Reference

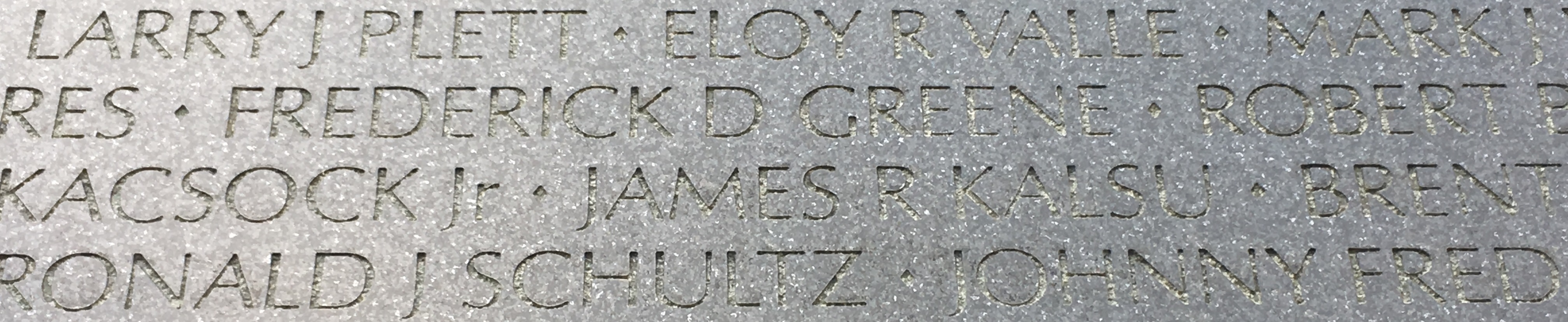
Kalsu's name (third row, middle) on the Vietnam Veterans Memorial

James Robert Kalsu (April 13, 1945 – July 21, 1970) was an American professional football player who was an All-American tackle at the University of Oklahoma and an eighth-round selection in the 1968 NFL/AFL draft by the Buffalo Bills of the American Football League (AFL). Kalsu joined the U.S. Army as an officer after the 1968 season and was killed in action in the Vietnam War in 1970.

Kalsu was one of two professional football players killed in the Vietnam War and the last to be killed serving as a soldier in a war until Pat Tillman in 2004.

== Biography ==
James Robert Kalsu was born on 13 April 1945 in Oklahoma City, Oklahoma, and attended Del City High School. Kalsu was a starting guard for the Buffalo Bills in the 1968 season, playing the entire season and was the Bills' team rookie-of-the-year.

Following the 1968 season, to satisfy his Reserve Officers' Training Corps (ROTC) obligation, Kalsu entered the U.S. Army as a second lieutenant and arrived in South Vietnam in November 1969 as part of the 101st Airborne Division. On July 21, 1970, Kalsu was killed in action at the Battle of Fire Support Base Ripcord when his unit came under enemy 82-millimeter mortar fire while stationed near the A Shau Valley in Thua Thien Province. His family has declined to talk in detail about the circumstances surrounding his death.

When Kalsu had left for South Vietnam, he had to say goodbye to his wife, Jan, and his daughter Jill. On July 23, 1970, two days after his death, Jan gave birth to his son, James Robert Kalsu Jr, at the Kalsu home in Oklahoma City, and was informed that he had died only hours later. Kalsu was one of two professional football players killed in action during the Vietnam War along with Don Steinbrunner, a former Cleveland Brown player who died on July 20, 1967. Kalsu and Steinbrunner were the first professional players to be killed in action since Al Blozis of the New York Football Giants died during World War II in 1945. Kalsu remained the last professional player to be killed in action until Pat Tillman died in the Afghanistan War in 2004.

== Legacy ==
- FOB Kalsu in Babil, Iraq, was founded and named after him by the 105th Military Police Company from Buffalo, New York, in early 2003. The name was chosen in a way to honor his sacrifice for his country and his connection to the Buffalo Bills.
- In 1999, NFL Films produced a feature on Kalsu that was nominated for an Emmy Award.
- In 2000, the Buffalo Bills added Kalsu's name to the Buffalo Bills Wall of Fame.
- In 2002, the replacement company at Fort Campbell was named in honor of him – 1LT J. Robert Kalsu Replacement Company.
- Del City High School's football stadium bears his name.
- There is a CrossFit Work Out of the Day (WOD) named in his honor.
- There is a post office in Del City, Oklahoma, named for Kalsu. The legislation was signed in law by President Barack Obama on November 5, 2015, and the post office was dedicated on November 5, 2016. The official name of the post office is the James Robert Kalsu Post Office, located at 4500 SE 28th Street in Del City, where Kalsu played high school football before enrolling at the University of Oklahoma.

== Awards and decorations ==

Badge	Parachutist Badge		
1st Row	Bronze Star Medal		
2nd Row	Purple Heart Medal	Army Commendation Medal	National Defense Service Medal
3rd Row	Vietnam Service Medal with 3 bronze Campaign stars	South Vietnamese Gallantry Cross with Palm	Vietnam Campaign Medal

== See also ==
- Elmer Gedeon and Harry O'Neill – the two Major League Baseball players killed in World War II.
- Tim James – Basketball player who left his professional sports career and enlisted in the United States Army on September 12, 2008.
