= Hilton Crawford =

American football player (1945–2014)

No. 45
- Position: Defensive back

Personal information
- Born: February 2, 1945; Converse, Louisiana, U.S.
- Died: July 5, 2014 (aged 69); Buffalo, New York, U.S.
- Listed height: 6 ft 2 in (1.88 m)
- Listed weight: 195 lb (88 kg)

Career information
- High school: Mansfield (LA) DeSoto
- College: Grambling State
- NFL draft: 1969: 9th round, 224th overall pick

Career history
- Buffalo Bills (1969)

Career AFL statistics
- Fumble recoveries: 1
- Kick return yards: 74
- Stats at Pro Football Reference

Hilton J. Crawford (February 2, 1945 – July 5, 2014) was an American professional football defensive back. He played for the Buffalo Bills in 1969.

He died on July 5, 2014, in Buffalo, New York at age 69.
