= Gary McDermott =

American football player (born 1946)

No. 32, 45
- Position: Running back

Personal information
- Born: June 9, 1946 (age 80); Longview, Texas, U.S.
- Listed height: 6 ft 2 in (1.88 m)
- Listed weight: 211 lb (96 kg)

Career information
- High school: Judson (Converse, Texas)
- College: Tulsa (1964-1967)
- NFL draft: 1968: 9th round, 227th overall pick

Career history
- Buffalo Bills (1968); Atlanta Falcons (1969)

Career NFL/AFL statistics
- Rushing yards: 108
- Rushing average: 2
- Receptions: 20
- Receiving yards: 115
- Total touchdowns: 4
- Stats at Pro Football Reference

Gary Don McDermott (born June 9, 1946) is an American former professional football player who was a running back in the American Football League (AFL) and National Football League (NFL) for the Buffalo Bills and Atlanta Falcons. He played college football for the Tulsa Golden Hurricane.
