= Dennis Shaw =

American football player (born 1947)

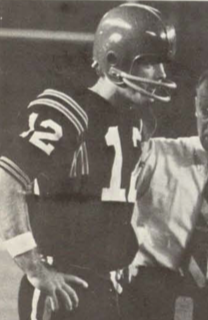
- Shaw with San Diego State in 1969

No. 16, 11
- Position: Quarterback

Personal information
- Born: March 3, 1947 (age 79); Los Angeles, California, U.S.
- Listed height: 6 ft 3 in (1.91 m)
- Listed weight: 217 lb (98 kg)

Career information
- High school: Damien (La Verne, California)
- College: USC (1966); San Diego State (1968–1969)
- NFL draft: 1970: 2nd round, 30th overall pick

Career history
- Buffalo Bills (1970–1973); St. Louis Cardinals (1974–1975); Green Bay Packers (1976)*; New York Giants (1976); New York Giants (1977)*; Kansas City Chiefs (1978); Chicago Blitz (1984)
- * Offseason or practice squad member only

Awards and highlights
- NFL Offensive Rookie of the Year (1970); NCAA passing yards leader (1969); Second-team All-Pac-8 (1969)

Career NFL statistics
- Passing attempts: 924
- Passing completions: 489
- Completion percentage: 52.9%
- TD–INT: 35–68
- Passing yards: 6,347
- Passer rating: 56.8
- Stats at Pro Football Reference

Dennis Wendell Shaw (born March 3, 1947) is an American former professional football player who was a quarterback in the National Football League (NFL) for the Buffalo Bills, St. Louis Cardinals, New York Giants, and Kansas City Chiefs. He played college football for the San Diego State Aztecs.

== Career ==
=== College ===
Shaw played college football for the San Diego State University Aztecs. While playing for the Aztecs he set an NCAA record by throwing nine touchdown passes in a 70–10 win against the New Mexico State Aggies on November 15, 1969. In that same season he set a single season school record for touchdown passes (39) and passes intercepted (26), the latter statistic led the NCAA for that season. He transferred from the University of Southern California and also played prior to that at Mt. San Antonio College.

=== NFL ===
Shaw was drafted in the second round of the 1970 draft by the Buffalo Bills. He was the third quarterback on the roster for the team next to Dan Darragh and James Harris. In the first game of the season, he stepped in for Darragh, going 4-for-7 for 52 yards in the 25–10 loss to the Denver Broncos. In the second game, he took over for an ineffective Darragh and went 13-of-18 for 143 yards, although he threw two interceptions in the 19–0 loss to the Los Angeles Rams. He was named the starter for the following game against the New York Jets. Shaw went 12-of-21 for 317 yards with two touchdowns and two interceptions in the 34–31 victory, with his pass to Marlin Briscoe delivering the victory. It was one of only three games where Shaw would throw two touchdowns along with one of only two games with over 300 yards passing. For 1970 Shaw threw for 10 touchdowns and 20 interceptions. He threw an interception in all but one of the games he started while passing for 2,507 yards and a 65.3 passing rating, while the Bills went 3–10–1 after losing six of their last seven games (with one tie).

Despite a dismal season, he was sixth in yards, sixteenth in touchdowns, seventh in completion percentage alongside being second in interceptions. He was plagued by fumbles, for which he had ten of in the season along with being sacked 41 times. Shaw was named NFL Offensive Rookie of the Year by the Associated Press in 1970, becoming the first quarterback to ever receive the award since its 1967 inception; no quarterback would win again until Ben Roethlisberger in 2004.

Shaw started the next season with a 18-of-30 day for 353 yards with four touchdowns and three interceptions in a 49–37 loss to the Dallas Cowboys. The rest of the year was dismal, as the Bills went 1–13 with minimal scoring. Shaw threw for 1,813 yards in twelve starts and thirteen appearances, having eleven touchdowns and 26 interceptions (a league high) with a 51.2 completion percentage.

In 1972, Shaw’s fortunes improved slightly. He started all but one of the games in the 4–9–1 campaign, throwing for 1,666 yards while having fourteen touchdowns and seventeen interceptions for a 52.7 completion percentage. The 1973 season was his last with the Bills, who drafted Joe Ferguson in the third round of that year, leading to a quarterback competition that Ferguson won. The Bills rose to 9–5 via the 2,003-yard rushing attack of O. J. Simpson, but Shaw started zero games and Ferguson would remain the primary Bills quarterback for the remainder of the decade. Shaw saw action in four games, completing 22 of 46 passes for 300 yards and four interceptions. In his career as a Bills starter, he went 8–27–2.

=== After the Bills ===
Shaw was traded to the Cardinals for Ahmad Rashad, reuniting Shaw with his college coach, Don Coryell. He threw eight total passes in two seasons with the Cardinals.

Between playing football, Shaw did jobs such as insurance sales, business consultancy and carpet franchise supervision. He was on the roster of the 1976 New York Giants and 1978 Kansas City Chiefs but never saw regular-season action for either team.

=== Coaching ===
He served as assistant coach for Eastern Illinois in 1980, Chula Vista High School in 1981, Western Illinois in 1983 before being assistant coach/player with the Chicago Blitz of the United States Football League in 1984, although no job was longer than a year, owing to his desire to keep his family of four children in the area of San Diego. He applied to be coach at San Diego State in 1980, but he was denied, although he did call games on KSDO for the team in 1986 for a year. He was to be offensive coordinator of the San Diego Thunder of the World Indoor Football League in 1988, but the league folded before playing a down.

== NFL career statistics ==
Legend
	Led the league
**Bold**	Career high

Year	Team	Games			Passing									Rushing					Sacks	
Year	Team	GP	GS	Record	Cmp	Att	Pct	Yds	Y/A	Lng	TD	Int	Rtg	Att	Yds	Avg	Lng	TD	Sck	Yds
1970	BUF	**14**	12	3–8–1	**178**	**321**	**55.5**	**2,507**	**7.8**	48	10	20	**65.3**	**39**	**210**	5.4	**20**	0	**41**	**387**
1971	BUF	13	12	1–11	149	291	51.2	1,813	6.2	**75**	11	**26**	46.1	14	82	**5.9**	12	0	33	276
1972	BUF	**14**	**13**	**4–8–1**	136	258	52.7	1,666	6.5	58	**14**	17	63.5	35	138	3.9	16	0	38	320
1973	BUF	4	0	0–0	22	46	47.8	300	6.5	40	0	4	32.9	4	2	0.5	1	0	11	75
1974	STL	2	0	0–0	0	0	0.0	0	0.0	0	0	0	0.0	0	0	0.0	0	0	0	0
1975	STL	3	0	0–0	4	8	50.0	61	7.6	21	0	1	35.9	3	−12	−4.0	−2	0	1	14
Career		50	37	8–27–2	489	924	52.9	6,347	6.9	75	35	68	56.8	95	420	4.4	20	0	124	1,072

== See also ==
- List of NCAA major college football yearly passing leaders
- List of NCAA major college football yearly total offense leaders
