= Busty Underwood =

American football player (born 1948)

Profile
- Position: Quarterback

Personal information
- Born: October 5, 1948 (age 78); Lubbock, Texas, U.S.
- Listed height: 6 ft 3 in (1.91 m)
- Listed weight: 216 lb (98 kg)

Career information
- High school: Lubbock
- College: TCU (1967–1970)
- NFL draft: 1971: 13th round, 316th overall pick

Career history
- Buffalo Bills (1971)*
- * Offseason or practice squad member only

Harris Faulkner "Busty" Underwood III (born October 5, 1948) is an American former football quarterback. He played college football at TCU, and was selected by the Buffalo Bills in the 13th round of the 1971 NFL draft.

== Early life ==
Harris Faulkner Underwood III was born on October 5, 1948, in Lubbock, Texas. He attended Lubbock High School.

== College career ==
During Underwood's recruiting visit to Texas Christian University (TCU), he checked into a hotel and declined a walkthrough, stating that he wanted to look over the campus himself. After Underwood was done, he told head coach Fred Taylor not to call him and that Underwood would call Taylor if he was interested. A few months later, Taylor had not heard anything from Underwood so he called and asked him if he had decided on a school. Underwood replied "Why, TCU, coach". Underwood played quarterback for TCU's freshman team, the TCU Wogs, in 1967. He was then a backup quarterback and occasional placekicker for the TCU Horned Frogs varsity team from 1968 to 1970. Prior to the 1970 season, one magazine called Underwood the best professional football prospect who was not a starter. Through October 24, 1969, he had kicked two field goals. Through November 19, 1970, he had gone 10 for 10 on extra points. Underwood attempted 64 passes during his varsity career, completing 29 of them (45.3%) for 355 yards, two touchdowns, and seven interceptions.

== Professional career ==
Underwood was selected by the Buffalo Bills in the 13th round, with the 316th overall pick, of the 1971 NFL draft as a quarterback. He was named to the Bills' taxi squad for the 1971 NFL season. He was released during training camp on July 20, 1972.
