= Louis Ross (American football) =

American football player (born 1947)

No. 87, 81, 75
- Position: Defensive end

Personal information
- Born: August 31, 1947 (age 79); Orlando, Florida, U.S.
- Listed height: 6 ft 6 in (1.98 m)
- Listed weight: 248 lb (112 kg)

Career information
- High school: Jones (Orlando)
- College: South Carolina State
- NFL draft: 1971: 8th round, 183rd overall pick

Career history
- Buffalo Bills (1971–1972); Atlanta Falcons (1973)*; San Diego Chargers (1973)*; Toronto Argonauts (1974)*; Florida Blazers (1974); Philadelphia Bell (1975); Kansas City Chiefs (1975); New Orleans Saints (1976–1977)*
- * Offseason or practice squad member only
- Stats at Pro Football Reference

Louis Edward Ross (born August 31, 1947) is an American former professional football defensive end who played in the National Football League (NFL) with the Buffalo Bills and Kansas City Chiefs. He played college football for the South Carolina State Bulldogs and was selected by the Bills in the eighth round of the 1971 NFL draft.

== Early life ==
Louis Edward Ross was born on August 31, 1947, in Orlando, Florida. He attended Jones High School in Orlando.

== College career ==
Ross enrolled at South Carolina State University to play college basketball for the Bulldogs. He was the team's starting center and leading rebounder. He joined the football team his junior year, playing two seasons as a defensive end.

== Professional career ==
Ross was selected by the Bills in the eighth round, with the 183rd overall pick, of the 1971 NFL draft. He played in 19 games, starting one, for the Bills from 1971 to 1972.

On August 23, 1973, Ross was traded to the Atlanta Falcons for Willie Belton. On August 30, Ross was traded to the San Diego Chargers for an undisclosed 1974 draft pick. He was waived by San Diego on September 7, 1973, before the final preseason game.

Ross signed a one-year contract with the Toronto Argonauts of the Canadian Football League for the 1974 CFL season. However, in June 1974, he signed with the Florida Blazers of the upstart World Football League (WFL) for the 1974 WFL season. The Orlando Sentinel reported that a contract dispute was expected with the CFL. Blazers general manager Rommie Loudd said that the WFL honored CFL contracts but "this is a special case. This is a local boy. I call this the home rule case. And I don't think that one little player is gonna make that much difference." Ross went to court against the Argonauts but lost the case. The Blazers then purchased Ross' contract from the Argonauts. He played in 17 of 20 games for the Blazers in 1974 and scored a safety.

The Blazer folded after the 1974 season, so Ross signed with the WFL's Philadelphia Bell on June 10, 1975. He played in all 11 games for the Bell in 1975 before the league folded during midseason.

Ross then signed with the Kansas City Chiefs on November 20, 1975. He appeared in one game for the Chiefs during the 1975 NFL season.

Ross was signed by the New Orleans Saints in 1976. He was released in early August 1976 after the first preseason game. He signed with the Saints again in 1977 but was later released on June 8, 1977.

== Personal life ==
In 1974, Ross and Tom Laputka were "guinea pigs" for the testing of new strength training machines in Lake Helen, Florida.
