= Willie Grate =

American football player (1945-1980)

No. 85
- Position: Tight end

Personal information
- Born: May 25, 1945; Georgetown, South Carolina, U.S.
- Died: December 1980 (aged 35)
- Listed height: 6 ft 4 in (1.93 m)
- Listed weight: 225 lb (102 kg)

Career information
- High school: Whittermore
- College: South Carolina State
- NFL draft: 1969: 6th round, 143rd overall pick

Career history
- Buffalo Bills (1969–1970)
- Stats at Pro Football Reference

Willie Grate (May 25, 1945 – December 1980) was an American professional football tight end who played for the Buffalo Bills of the National Football League (NFL). He played college football at South Carolina State University.
