= Ben Gregory =

American football player (1946–1997)

No. 33
- Position: Running back

Personal information
- Born: October 31, 1946; Uniontown, Pennsylvania, U.S.
- Died: April 10, 1997 (aged 50); Louisville, Colorado, U.S.
- Listed height: 6 ft 3 in (1.91 m)
- Listed weight: 220 lb (100 kg)

Career information
- High school: Uniontown
- College: Nebraska (1964-1967)
- NFL draft: 1968: 5th round, 114th overall pick

Career history
- Buffalo Bills (1968)

Career AFL statistics
- Rushing yards: 283
- Rushing average: 5.4
- Receptions: 5
- Receiving yards: 21
- Total touchdowns: 1
- Stats at Pro Football Reference

Bennett Maurice Gregory (October 31, 1946 – April 10, 1997) was an American professional football running back in the American Football League (AFL) who played for the Buffalo Bills. He played college football for the Nebraska Cornhuskers.

Gregory died of a heart attack in 1997.
