= Max Anderson (American football) =

American football player (born 1945)

No. 22
- Positions: Running back, Return specialist

Personal information
- Born: June 6, 1945; Stockton, California, U.S.
- Died: November 2, 2023 (aged 78); Chandler, Arizona, U.S.
- Listed height: 5 ft 8 in (1.73 m)
- Listed weight: 180 lb (82 kg)

Career information
- High school: Mary A. Brown (Smithville, Texas)
- College: Arizona State
- NFL draft: 1968: 5th round, 132nd overall pick

Career history
- Buffalo Bills (1968–1969, 1971)

Career AFL statistics
- Rushing yards: 599
- Rushing average: 3.7
- Receptions: 29
- Receiving yards: 205
- Total touchdowns: 4
- Stats at Pro Football Reference

Max Arthur Anderson (June 6, 1945 – November 2, 2023) was an American collegiate and professional football running back and kick returner. He played in the American Football League (AFL) for the Buffalo Bills from 1968 through 1969. He played college football at Arizona State University.

== See also ==
- List of American Football League players
