= Jerald Collins =

American football player (born 1947)

No. 51
- Position: Linebacker

Personal information
- Born: February 1, 1947 (age 79); Muskegon, Michigan, U.S.

Career information
- High school: Muskegon
- College: Western Michigan

Career history
- Buffalo Bills (1969-1971)

Career statistics
- Games played: 14
- Kickoff returns: 4
- Stats at Pro Football Reference

Jerald Ezra Collins (born February 1, 1947) is an American former professional football player who was a linebacker for the Buffalo Bills in the American Football League (AFL) and National Football League (NFL) from 1969 to 1971. He played college football for the Western Michigan Broncos.
