= Charley Ferguson =

American football player (1939–2023)

No. 85, 88, 80
- Positions: Wide receiver, tight end

Personal information
- Born: November 13, 1939; Dallas, Texas, U.S.
- Died: February 14, 2023 (aged 83); Buffalo, New York, U.S.
- Listed height: 6 ft 5 in (1.96 m)
- Listed weight: 217 lb (98 kg)

Career information
- College: Tennessee State (1957–1960)
- NFL draft: 1961: undrafted

Career history
- Cleveland Browns (1961); Minnesota Vikings (1962); Buffalo Bills (1963–1969)

Awards and highlights
- 2× AFL champion (1964, 1965); AFL All-Star (1965)

Career NFL/AFL statistics
- Receptions: 62
- Receiving yards: 1,168
- Touchdowns: 13
- Stats at Pro Football Reference

Charles Edward Ferguson (November 13, 1939 – February 14, 2023) was an American professional football player who was a tight end in the American Football League (AFL) with the Buffalo Bills. He was in playoff games with the Bills in four straight years from 1963 to 1966, and won AFL championships with them in 1964 and 1965. He was an AFL All-Star in 1965.

Ferguson also played in the National Football League for the Cleveland Browns and Minnesota Vikings.

== See also ==
- List of American Football League players
