= Paul Guidry =

American football player (born 1944)

No. 59, 58
- Position: Linebacker

Personal information
- Born: January 14, 1944 (age 82); Breaux Bridge, Louisiana, U.S.
- Listed height: 6 ft 3 in (1.91 m)
- Listed weight: 227 lb (103 kg)

Career information
- High school: Breaux Bridge
- College: LSU; McNeese State
- AFL draft: 1966: 8th round, 73rd overall pick

Career history
- Buffalo Bills (AFL) (1966–1969); Buffalo Bills (NFL) (1970–1972); Houston Oilers (NFL) (1973)

Career statistics
- Games played: 106
- Stats at Pro Football Reference

Paul Michael Guidry (born January 14, 1944) is an American former professional football player who was a linebacker for eight seasons in the American Football League (AFL) and National Football League (NFL). He played college football for the LSU Tigers and McNeese State Cowboys, playing on an undefeated team for the Cowboys. Guidry was selected by the Buffalo Bills in the eighth round of the 1966 AFL draft

== Early life and college ==
Guidry was born on January 14, 1944, in Breaux Bridge, Louisiana. He attended Beaux Bridge High School, where he excelled in football and basketball. Guidry originally attended Louisiana State University as a freshman and then went into the army reserve for six months.

After his active reserve service ended, Guidry attended McNeese State University. He played tight end and defensive end on its football team, and was a member of the 1963 Cowboys team that went undefeated. He was on two championship teams (1963-1964). He was named All-Gulf States Conference twice. He was the team's leading receiver in 1964. In 1991, he was inducted into McNeese's Athletics Hall of Fame.

== Professional career ==
Guidry was selected by the Buffalo Bills of the American Football League in the eighth round of the 1966 AFL draft, 73rd overall. He was not selected in the NFL draft that year. Breaux Bridge declared May 10, 1966 "Paul Guidry Day" in honor of his being drafted and signed by the Bills. He wore number 59 as a Bill, and played for the Bills through 1972.

Guidry played all 14 games as a rookie, but mostly on special teams, starting one game at linebacker. In 1967, he started four games and in 1968 started all 14 games at linebacker. He continued as a starter through 1972, though missing six games with an injury in 1969. He was named second-team All-Conference by United Press International in 1970.

During his career he had intercepted passes against AFL quarterbacks like future Hall of Fame player Joe Namath (New York Jets), AFL MVP John Hadl (San Diego Chargers), and two-time AFL Player of the Year Daryle Lamonica (Oakland Raiders), but his career highlight was intercepting a pass thrown by Baltimore Colts great Johnny Unitas, whom he idolized as a young teen.

In 1972, Guidry was selected by his teammates as the Bills defensive captain (O.J. Simpson being the offensive captain). The next year he was traded to the Houston Oilers for Allen Aldridge, where he played in 14 games, starting six. He was cut by the Oilers and then the New York Giants in 1974, and did not play in the NFL again. He played with the Portland Storm of the World Football League in 1974. He was signed and released by the Kansas City Chiefs in 1975, without playing a game, ending his playing career.

While at Buffalo, he spent three years as a player representative for National Football League Players Association. In 1970, Guidry was selected for the All-AFC (American Football Conference of the NFL) Team.

Guidry was named one of the top 15 players to wear No. 59 for the Buffalo Bills.

== Personal life ==
Guidry was renowned in Buffalo for being one of the original owners of Mothers restaurant. Guidry lives in Mt. Juliet, Tennessee, which is located just outside Nashville and only about 30 miles from Middle Tennessee. Guidry has supported Golf Tournament For Cystic Fibrosis in Tennessee, and was active with muscular dystrophy telethons in New York. He also became involved in education as a teacher, coach, and assistant principal.

He served in the United States Army Reserve for six years.

== See also ==
- Other American Football League players
