= Edgar Chandler =

American football player (1946–1992)

No. 52, 50
- Position: Linebacker

Personal information
- Born: August 31, 1946; Cedartown, Georgia, U.S.
- Died: October 17, 1992 (aged 46); Rome, Georgia, U.S.
- Listed height: 6 ft 3 in (1.91 m)
- Listed weight: 225 lb (102 kg)

Career information
- High school: Cedartown
- College: Georgia
- NFL draft: 1968: 4th round, 86th overall pick

Career history
- Buffalo Bills (1968-1972); New England Patriots (1973); Birmingham Americans (1974)

Awards and highlights
- Consensus All-American (1967); First-team All-American (1966); 2× First-team All-SEC (1966, 1967)

Career NFL/AFL statistics
- Fumble recoveries: 3
- Interceptions: 2
- Touchdowns: 1
- Sacks: 2.5
- Stats at Pro Football Reference

Edgar Thomas Chandler, Jr. (August 31, 1946 – October 17, 1992) was an American professional football player who played linebacker for six seasons for the Buffalo Bills in the American Football League (AFL) and National Football League (NFL), and for the NFL's New England Patriots. Chandler was a two-time All-American at the University of Georgia, in 1966 and 1967.

== Early life ==
Chandler was raised in Cedartown, Georgia, by his mother. Nova Chandler, and his father, Edgar Chandler. Sr. Chandler Jr. attended school in Cedartown,. He played three sports during his high school days at Cedartown High School. Chandler was starter for the varsity basketball Bulldogs. He also competed in track and field, becoming a Georgia state high school shot put champion with a toss of 53 feet and 1 ½ inches. He was an All-American offensive lineman his senior year in 1963. He helped the Cedartown Bulldogs to their first state football championship.

== College career ==
Chandler was an offensive right tackle for the University of Georgia from 1964 to 1967. Chandler accepted an invitation to three different bowl games in his senior year: The Liberty Bowl, the North-South Bowl, and the Hula Bowl. He was first-team All-SEC in 1966. The Bulldogs finished the 1966 season 10–1 overall with an undefeated 5–0 record in the Southeastern Conference. Chandler helped lead the Bulldogs to the 1967 Cotton Bowl Championship.

== Professional career ==
Chandler was drafted by the Buffalo Bills in the fourth round of the 1968 NFL/AFL common draft. He was converted to inside linebacker as a professional to take advantage of his speed and agility. Chandler played from 1968 to 1972 for the Buffalo Bills and in 1973 for the New England Patriots. Before ending his football career he played his last year with the Birmingham Americans of the upstart World Football League where he helped them to win the World Championship. Chandler scored his only touchdown as a professional during week 7 of the 1970 AFL season. It came in the first quarter against the Boston Patriots when he intercepted the ball and returned it 58 yards to the end zone.

== Life after football ==
In a 1977 episode of the Tonight Show with guest host Don Rickles, Chandler was interviewed by Rickles in the audience.

In 1988 Chandler was inducted into the Georgia Sports Hall of Fame.
