= Wayne Patrick =

American football player (1946–2010)

No. 30
- Position: Running back

Personal information
- Born: September 1, 1946; Gainesville, Florida, U.S.
- Died: March 23, 2010 (aged 63); Buffalo, New York, U.S.
- Listed height: 6 ft 2 in (1.88 m)
- Listed weight: 254 lb (115 kg)

Career information
- High school: Lincoln (Gainesville)
- College: Louisville
- NFL draft: 1968: 10th round, 247th overall pick

Career history
- Buffalo Bills (1968-1972)

Career NFL/AFL statistics
- Rushing yards: 1,084
- Rushing average: 4.1
- Receptions: 96
- Receiving yards: 745
- Total touchdowns: 6
- Stats at Pro Football Reference

Wayne Allen Patrick (September 1, 1946 – March 23, 2010) was a professional American football running back for five seasons for the Buffalo Bills in both the American Football League (AFL) and the National Football League (NFL). He was born in Gainesville, Florida. He settled in Amherst, a suburb of Buffalo after retiring from football and raised his family. He married Mary Mittie Richard and had four children Wayne JR, Melissa, Jadah, and Joel. He died on March 23, 2010, after a lengthy battle with heart and kidney disease.
