= Paul Costa (American football) =

American football player (1941–2015)

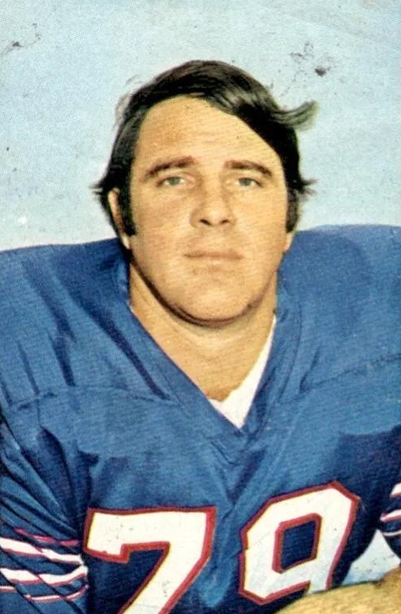

No. 82, 79
- Positions: Tight end, Offensive tackle

Personal information
- Born: December 7, 1941; Port Chester, New York, U.S.
- Died: October 12, 2015 (aged 73); Grapevine, Texas, U.S.
- Listed height: 6 ft 6 in (1.98 m)
- Listed weight: 268 lb (122 kg)

Career information
- High school: Port Chester
- College: Notre Dame (1960-1964)
- NFL draft: 1964: 4th round, 55th overall pick
- AFL draft: 1964: 14th round, 106th overall pick

Career history
- Buffalo Bills (1965-1972); Birmingham Americans (1974); Birmingham Vulcans (1975)

Awards and highlights
- AFL champion (1965); 2× AFL All-Star (1965, 1966)

Career NFL/AFL statistics
- Receptions: 102
- Receiving yards: 1,699
- Receiving touchdowns: 6
- Stats at Pro Football Reference

Sebastian Paul Costa (December 7, 1941 – October 12, 2015) was an American football tight end.

== Early life ==
He played college football for the University of Notre Dame's Fighting Irish.

== Pro career ==
Costa breaks away against the Raiders, 1965 (original art by AFL archivist A. F. Coniglio)

The American Football League (AFL)'s Kansas City Chiefs drafted him in his junior year, 1964, and he was traded to the AFL's Buffalo Bills for the 1965 season. He won a starting job at tight end his rookie year with the Bills, and soon became an excellent tight end, being named an AFL All-Star in his first two seasons.

As a rookie, Costa averaged 19.1 yards per catch. For his career, he averaged 16.7 yards per catch. In his first year, in the 1965 AFL Championship game against the San Diego Chargers, he teamed with Ernie Warlick in one of the first uses of the "double tight end" formation installed by head coach Lou Saban. Costa caught two passes for 32 yards, Warlick caught three for 35 yards and a touchdown as the Bills defeated the Chargers for the second consecutive year, this time shutting them out 23 - 0, the first shutout in AFL Championship game history. In Costa's fifth year in pro football, he moved to offensive tackle and played that position for four years. After playing eight years for the Bills, he retired for one year, then came out of retirement to play for the Birmingham Americans of the World Football League in 1974 and Birmingham Vulcans in 1975.

Costa earned a B.A. degree in Communications from Notre Dame. He also held a Masters and Ph.D. from the California Graduate School of Theology. Paul was a full-time minister since retiring from football. He was a pastor for sixteen years, and traveled nationally and internationally as a speaker in churches, conferences, and schools. He co-authored a book with Dr. John Kelly (End Time Warriors) that was published by Regal Book. He died of complications of prostate cancer on October 12, 2015.
