= Dick Cunningham (American football) =

American football player (born 1944)

No. 62, 63, 51, 49
- Positions: Offensive tackle, Linebacker

Personal information
- Born: October 12, 1944 (age 82); Boston, Massachusetts, U.S.
- Listed height: 6 ft 3 in (1.91 m)
- Listed weight: 245 lb (111 kg)

Career information
- High school: Thomas Jefferson (San Antonio, Texas)
- College: Arkansas (1963–1966)
- NFL draft: 1966: 9th round, 136th overall pick
- AFL draft: 1966: Red Shirt 4th round, 36th overall pick

Career history
- Buffalo Bills (1967–1972); Philadelphia Eagles (1973); Houston Oilers (1973); Detroit Lions (1974)

Awards and highlights
- First-team All-SWC (1966)

Career NFL/AFL statistics
- Games played: 66
- Games started: 29
- Fumble recoveries: 2
- Stats at Pro Football Reference

Richard Karekin Cunningham (born October 12, 1944) is an American former professional football player who was a linebacker in the American Football League (AFL) and National Football League (NFL). He played in the AFL for the Buffalo Bills and in the NFL for the Bills, the Houston Oilers, and the Philadelphia Eagles. Cunningham played college football for the Arkansas Razorbacks and was selected in the eighth round of the 1966 NFL draft by the Detroit Lions and the fourth round of the Red Shirt portion of the 1966 AFL draft by the Buffalo Bills. He played professionally from 1967 to 1973.

While at Arkansas, Cunningham was a member of Xi chapter of Kappa Sigma fraternity.

== See also ==
- Other American Football League players
