= Bob Lustig =

American football executive (1924–2005)

- Born: Robert Henry Lustig; July 12, 1924; Chicago, Illinois, U.S.
- Died: November 5, 2005 (aged 81); Detroit, Michigan, U.S.
- Occupation: American professional sports executive
- Years active: 1960-1979
- Known for: Role as General Manager of the NFL's Buffalo Bills (1967-1979)

Robert Thomas Lustig (July 12, 1924 – November 5, 2005) was an American football executive who worked for the Buffalo Bills from 1960 to 1979. A business associate of Bills owner Ralph Wilson from 1948, Lustig began his tenure with the Bills in 1960, primarily working as a contract negotiator. He was promoted to team vice president in 1964, and became general manager in 1967. Under his leadership, the Bills drafted O. J. Simpson number one overall in the 1969 NFL/AFL draft, and built Rich Stadium in 1973. He left the Bills in 1979 to work for Ralph Wilson's insurance agency in Detroit. Lustig attended the University of Detroit, where he played baseball, and served in the 104th Infantry Division of the United States Army during World War II. Lustig died on November 5, 2005, at the age of 81.
