= Mike McBath =

American football player (born 1946)

No. 76
- Positions: Defensive end, Defensive tackle, Offensive tackle

Personal information
- Born: May 29, 1946 (age 80); Woodbury, New Jersey, U.S.
- Listed height: 6 ft 4 in (1.93 m)
- Listed weight: 251 lb (114 kg)

Career information
- High school: Woodbury Junior-Senior
- College: Penn State
- NFL draft: 1968: 5th round, 119th overall pick

Career history
- Buffalo Bills (1968–1972); Washington Redskins (1973); Florida Blazers (1974)

Awards and highlights
- Second-team All-East (1967)

Career NFL/AFL statistics
- Fumble recoveries: 3
- Sacks: 9
- Stats at Pro Football Reference

Michael Strickler McBath (born May 29, 1946) is an American businessman, former professional American football player, and part-owner of the Orlando Predators of the Arena Football League (AFL). He is a former president of the NFL Retired Players Association.

McBath is currently a senior vice president with Union Bank of Switzerland (formerly Paine Webber).

== AFL ownership ==
In 1991, McBath co-founded the Orlando Predators, one of the Arena Football League's most successful franchises. McBath and his partners sold the team in 1997, but he returned as a part-owner in 2004.

== Football ==
McBath played five seasons (1968–1972) in the National Football League with the Buffalo Bills. McBath was released midway through the 1972 after suffering a sciatic nerve injury. He signed briefly with the Washington Redskins before moving to World Football League to play a season with the Florida Blazers.

McBath was a two-way player at Penn State, playing offensive and defensive line. He was inducted into the Gloucester County Sports Hall of Fame in 1992 for his accomplishments while at Woodbury Junior-Senior High School in Woodbury, New Jersey.

== Charity ==
McBath is involved with Orlando-based "The City of Legends," an organization which provides benefits and services for retired professional athletes in exchange for participation in local charity events.
