= Howard Kindig =

American football player (born 1941)

No. 87, 73, 54, 59
- Positions: Center, Defensive end, Defensive tackle

Personal information
- Born: June 22, 1941 (age 85); Mexico, Missouri, U.S.
- Listed height: 6 ft 6 in (1.98 m)
- Listed weight: 265 lb (120 kg)

Career information
- High school: Mexico
- College: Los Angeles State
- NFL draft: 1964: 13th round, 170th overall pick
- AFL draft: 1964: 14th round, 112th overall pick

Career history
- San Diego Chargers (1965-1967); Buffalo Bills (1967–1971); Miami Dolphins (1972–1973); Washington Redskins (1974)*; Jacksonville Sharks (1974); New York Jets (1974); Jacksonville Express (1975)
- * Offseason or practice squad member only

Awards and highlights
- Super Bowl champion (VII)

Career NFL/AFL statistics
- Fumble recoveries: 1
- Interceptions: 1
- Sacks: 3
- Stats at Pro Football Reference

Howard Wayne Kindig, Jr. (born June 22, 1941) is an American former professional football player who was a defensive end for 10 seasons in the American Football League (AFL) and the National Football League (NFL), primarily with the Buffalo Bills. He played college football for the Los Angeles State Diablos.

Kindig started his NFL career as a defensive end with the San Diego Chargers in 1965. After 3 seasons with San Diego he moved to the Bills, where he played defensive end, offensive tackle and center. Kindig decided to retire after the 1971 season with the Bills, but the Miami Dolphins traded for his rights in exchange for defensive tackle Frank Cornish and a conditional draft pick, and Dolphins coach Don Shula was able to convince Kindig to unretire. Kindig was able to make the Dolphins 1972 team after Jim Langer beat out Miami's 1971 starting center Bob DeMarco for the 1972 starting center position and DeMarco did not want to serve as the backup, opening a spot for Kindig.

Kindig was the long snapper for the undefeated 1972 Miami Dolphins, which completed a 17-0 season by defeating the Washington Redskins in Super Bowl VII. After the Super Bowl, Redskin coach George Allen claimed that one of the key plays in Miami's victory was a penalty Kindig drew on Washington linebacker Harold McLinton, when McLinton attempted to steal the ball from Kindig when he was long snapping on a punt, and the penalty allowed Miami to retain possession of the ball. Kindig broke his thumb during the 1973 preseason and missed the entire season, in which Miami won a 2nd consecutive Super Bowl.

Kindig was traded by Miami to the Redskins before the 1974 season in exchange for a draft pick, but was cut by the Redskins before the 1974 season began. He started the 1974 season with the Jacksonville Sharks of the World Football League after signing a contract that was supposed to pay him $75,000 per year for three years. He signed with the NFL New York Jets after the Sharks stopped paying its players and disbanded in the middle of the 1974 season. He returned to the WFL with the Jacksonville Express for the 1975 season but was released before the end of the season.

After retiring from football for good Kindig ran a real estate and appraisal company.

== See also ==
- Other American Football League players
