= Bob Tatarek =

American football player (born 1946)

No. 71
- Position: Defensive tackle

Personal information
- Born: July 3, 1946 (age 80); Greensburg, Pennsylvania, U.S.
- Listed height: 6 ft 4 in (1.93 m)
- Listed weight: 260 lb (118 kg)

Career information
- High school: Jeannette (Jeannette, Pennsylvania)
- College: Miami (FL)
- NFL draft: 1968: 2nd round, 34th overall pick

Career history
- Buffalo Bills (1968-1972); Detroit Lions (1972); Jacksonville Sharks (1974); Birmingham Americans (1974); Birmingham Vulcans (1975)

Awards and highlights
- World Bowl I champion

Career NFL/AFL statistics
- Fumble recoveries: 1
- Sacks: 14
- Stats at Pro Football Reference

Robert Francis Tatarek (born July 3, 1946) is an American former professional football player who played primarily for the Buffalo Bills of the American Football League (AFL), and later the National Football League (NFL). He last played in the NFL in 1972, splitting time between the Bills and Detroit Lions. From 1974 he played in the World Football League (WFL) for the Jacksonville Sharks and the Birmingham Americans, once the Sharks folded in-season. He finally played in 1975 for the Birmingham Vulcans.
