= John Rauch =

American gridiron football player and coach (1927–2008)

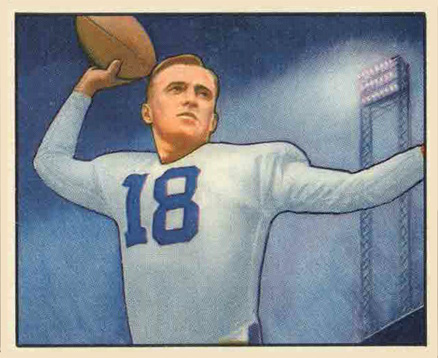
- Rauch on 1950 Bowman football card

No. 18, 11
- Position: Quarterback

Personal information
- Born: August 20, 1927; Philadelphia, Pennsylvania, U.S.
- Died: June 10, 2008 (aged 80); Oldsmar, Florida, U.S.
- Listed height: 6 ft 1 in (1.85 m)
- Listed weight: 195 lb (88 kg)

Career information
- High school: Yeadon (PA)
- College: Georgia
- NFL draft: 1949: 1st round, 2nd overall pick

Career history

Playing
- New York Bulldogs/Yanks (1949–1951); Philadelphia Eagles (1951)

Coaching
- Florida (1952–1953) Quarterbacks coach; Tulane (1954) Assistant coach; Georgia (1955–1958) Assistant coach; Army (1959–1961) Assistant coach; Tulane (1962) Assistant coach; Oakland Raiders (1963–1968); Assistant coach (1963–1965); Head coach (1966–1968); Buffalo Bills (1969–1970) Head coach; Philadelphia Eagles (1971–1972) Quarterbacks coach; Toronto Argonauts (1973–1974) Head coach; Atlanta Falcons (1975) Offensive backfield coach; Tampa Bay Buccaneers (1976) Offensive coordinator; Atlanta Falcons (1976) Assistant coach; Tampa Bay Bandits (1983–1985) Scouting director & offensive backfield coach

Awards and highlights
- AFL Coach of the Year (1967); First-team All-American (1948); SEC Player of the Year (1948); First-team All-SEC (1948); 2× Second-team All-SEC (1946, 1947); Florida–Georgia Hall of Fame

Career NFL statistics
- Passing attempts: 170
- Passing completions: 70
- Completion percentage: 41.2%
- TD–INT: 8–9
- Passing yards: 959
- Passer rating: 53.5
- Stats at Pro Football Reference

Head coaching record
- Regular season: 40–28–2 (.586)
- Postseason: 2–2 (.500)
- Career: 42–30–2 (.586)
- Coaching profile at Pro Football Reference
- College Football Hall of Fame

John Rauch (August 20, 1927 – June 10, 2008), also known by his nickname "Johnny Rauch", was an American professional football player and coach. He was head coach of the Oakland Raiders in the team's loss to the Green Bay Packers in Super Bowl II in early 1968.

== Early life ==
Rauch's football playing career almost ended before it began. At the age of 14, he was diagnosed with a heart murmur and instructed to give up the sport. Ignoring the dire warnings, Rauch was a three-sport star at Yeadon High School, then put together an outstanding college football career. Earning the starting quarterback slot for the University of Georgia as a true freshman in 1945, he led the Bulldogs to a 36–8–1 record. Included in these victories are four straight bowl game appearances, as well as an undefeated record in 1946. On an individual level, he won first-team All American accolades following his senior year in 1948, and left the school as college football's all-time passing leader with 4,044 yards.

== Playing career ==
Rauch was the second overall pick in the 1949 NFL draft, taken by the Detroit Lions, but then sent to the transplanted New York Bulldogs in exchange for the rights to SMU's Doak Walker. During his first season with the Bulldogs in 1949, Rauch saw action on both sides of the ball, throwing for 169 yards and one touchdown, while also intercepting two passes. The following year, he saw action in eight contests, throwing for 502 yards and six touchdowns, then split time with New York and the Philadelphia Eagles in 1951, combining for 288 yards and one touchdown pass. In 1952, rather than accept a trade to the Pittsburgh Steelers to become a player/coach, he accepted an offer from University of Florida Coach Bob Woodruff to join his staff in Gainesville.

== College coaching career ==
In 1952, Rauch began his coaching career with the first of two seasons at the University of Florida. After spending the 1954 season at Tulane University, he returned to his alma mater, Georgia, the next year as an assistant for four seasons. In 1959, he headed to West Point, NY as an Army assistant. Three years later, he went back to Tulane for the 1962 campaign.

== Professional football coaching career ==
In 1963, Rauch moved to the professional level with the AFL's Oakland Raiders. Working under head coach Al Davis as the offensive backs coach, Rauch was the heir apparent and was promoted to head coach in April 1966, when Mr. Davis became commissioner of the AFL.

After leading the Raiders to an 8–5–1 mark in his first year, Rauch's squad lost just once during the 1967 regular season and faced the Green Bay Packers in Super Bowl II in Miami. For his efforts, Rauch was named the AFL Coach of the Year.

In 1968, the team again flourished during the regular season with a 12–2 mark, defeated the Kansas City Chiefs in a Western Division playoff game, but lost the AFL championship game to the New York Jets. During his three years as head coach, Mr. Davis's frequent interference with the day to day coaching role became a source of aggravation for Rauch. On January 16, 1969, Rauch dealt with the problem by resigning from his championship team to become head coach of the struggling Buffalo Bills.

The shift meant going from one of the sport's top teams to the team that finished with the worst record. However, with the first pick in the 1969 NFL/AFL draft, the Bills selected Heisman Trophy-winning running back O. J. Simpson. Rauch then caused controversy by expecting Simpson to become more than the one-dimensional running back he was at the University of Southern California. He expected Simpson to become an all-around running back, necessary in Professional Football, by also blocking and receiving passes out of the backfield, as Rauch had coached successfully at Oakland. Simpson not known for his blocking prowess, refused to do these added things and the friction began. The media, unaware that Simpson often refused to take extra passing drills, viewing them as 'punishment', began a campaign that Rauch was using Simpson as a decoy, which did not explain the indecisiveness in Simpson's style. Having several aging and many very young players, Buffalo improved by only two games to finish with a 4–10 record in 1969.

Following a 3–10–1 record in 1970, Rauch avoided being dismissed, and was seemingly prepared to handle the reins for the upcoming year. However, on July 20, 1971, he abruptly resigned following a heated discussion with team owner Ralph C. Wilson Jr. The source of the argument stemmed from Rauch's comments about former Bills' players Ron McDole and Paul Maguire. Wilson, without any consultation with Rauch, had traded the 31-year-old McDole to the Washington Redskins. Maguire who had become a problem with excessive lack of decorum on the practice field, was not offered a contract for the 1971 season by Rauch. On Rauch's first television show of the 1971 season prior to opening training camp, when asked about McDole, he stated, in loyalty to Wilson, that they traded McDole "while they could get something in return" due to his age. When asked why he did not offer Maguire a contract, he commented that all Maguire cared about was "how to get out of work and when's the next party." Training camp opened the next day and later in the week Wilson arrived at camp and indicated that he would issue a statement of support for the players (in spite of the fact that Wilson himself had traded McDole). Rauch said "if you do that, you can have my resignation". Wilson accepted.

After briefly serving as a scout for the Packers, Rauch was hired on October 10 as quarterback coach of the Eagles. He served in that capacity until the entire staff was fired on December 18, 1972. Less than three weeks later, Rauch was hired as head coach of the Canadian Football League's Toronto Argonauts, leading the team to a playoff berth in his first year. After the team was sold to a new owner and a slow start to begin the 1974 season, Rauch was dismissed on September 4.

Returning to the NFL the following year, Rauch served as backfield coach for the Atlanta Falcons, but then resigned on February 18, 1976, to become offensive coordinator of the expansion Tampa Bay Buccaneers. That tenure would prove to be short after Rauch had repeated conflicts with head coach John McKay, over McKay's demand to only utilize the I-formation that Rauch rightfully thought could not be successful in the NFL. After a successful 334 total yards game against the Dolphins with Rauch and quarterback, Steve Spurrier, calling the plays, McKay commented that there wasn't anything they did in the game that they couldn't have done out of the I-formation. McKay called the plays the next week out of the I with no success, but complained about the offense's performance. Rauch had had enough with McKay and resigned.

The same day he resigned from Tampa, Rauch returned to Atlanta to work under interim coach Pat Peppler, but the staff was not retained after the team won three of its final nine games.

Desiring to live in the Tampa area, Rauch was intent on at least "semi-retirement" in 1977. Later in the same year, Rauch became aware of problems with the football program at a local school, Admiral Farragut Academy in St. Petersburg, Florida. He contacted the school and offered to help find a coach for the then-struggling program. When his search proved fruitless, Rauch felt an obligation to the school, and accepted the position as head coach for one season, on September 10, 1977; during that time, a successor was found. He also served as director of the short-lived Canadian-American Bowl, a postseason all-star game. Rauch also served as a part-time writer for the St. Petersburg Independent, a local newspaper that had him cover his old team, the Raiders, when they reached Super Bowl XV. Upon the arrival of the United States Football League, Rauch returned to professional football as the Tampa Bay Bandits' director of operations.

In 2003, Rauch was honored for his stellar career in the college ranks when he was inducted into the College Football Hall of Fame.

== Death ==
Rauch died in 2008 at age 80 in his sleep at his home in Oldsmar, Florida.

== Head coaching record ==
Team	Year	Regular season					Postseason			
Team	Year	Won	Lost	Ties	Win %	Finish	Won	Lost	Win %	Result
OAK	1966	8	5	1	.607	2nd in AFL Western	–	–	–	–
OAK	1967	13	1	0	.929	1st in AFL Western	1	1	.500	Lost to Green Bay Packers in Super Bowl II
OAK	1968	12	2	0	.857	1st in AFL Western	1	1	.500	Lost to New York Jets in AFL Championship Game
OAK Total		33	8	1	.798		2	2	.500	–
BUF	1969	4	10	0	.286	4th in AFL Eastern	–	–	–	–
BUF	1970	3	10	1	.250	4th in AFC East	–	–	–	–
BUF Total		7	20	1	.268		–	–	–	–
AFL Total		37	18	1	.700		2	2	.500	–
NFL Total		3	10	1	.250		–	–	–	–
TOR	1973	7	5	2	.571	2nd in CFL East	0	1	.000	Lost to Montreal Alouettes in East Semi-Final.
TOR	1974	3	4	0	.429	4th in CFL East	–	–	–	–
TOR Total		10	9	2	.524		0	1	.000	–
CFL Total		10	9	2	.524		0	1	.000	–
Total		50	37	4	.571		2	3	.400	–
