= John Pitts (American football) =

American football player (1945–2025)

No. 48
- Position: Safety

Personal information
- Born: February 28, 1945; Birmingham, Alabama, U.S.
- Died: June 19, 2025 (aged 80); Braselton, Georgia
- Listed height: 6 ft 4 in (1.93 m)
- Listed weight: 218 lb (99 kg)

Career information
- High school: Laguna Beach (Laguna Beach, California)
- College: Arizona State
- NFL draft: 1967: 1st round, 22nd overall pick

Career history
- Buffalo Bills (1967–1973); Denver Broncos (1973–1974); Cleveland Browns (1975); Denver Broncos (1975)

Career NFL/AFL statistics
- Interceptions: 10
- Fumble recoveries: 3
- Sacks: 1
- Stats at Pro Football Reference

John Martin Pitts (February 28, 1945 – June 19, 2025) is an American former professional football player. He played in the American Football League (AFL) for the Buffalo Bills and in the National Football League (NFL) for the Bills, Denver Broncos, and Cleveland Browns. He played college football for the Arizona State Sun Devils. In 2006, he was inducted into the Santa Ana Dons Hall of Fame.

Pitts died in Braselton, Georgia on June 19, 2025.
