= Ed Rutkowski =

American football player and politician (born 1941)

4th Executive of Erie County
- In office 1979–1987
- Preceded by: Edward Regan
- Succeeded by: Dennis Gorski

Personal details
- Born: March 21, 1941 (age 85) Kingston, Pennsylvania, U.S.
- Party: Republican
- Football career

No. 46, 40
- Positions: Wide receiver, quarterback

Career information
- College: Notre Dame

Career history
- Buffalo Bills (1963–1968); Montreal Alouettes (1969)

Awards and highlights
- 2× AFL champion (1964, 1965); AFL All-Star (1965)

Career statistics
- Passing attempts: 102
- Passing completions: 41
- Completion percentage: 40.2%
- TD–INT: 0–6
- Passing yards: 380
- Passer rating: 26.6
- Return yards: 3,015
- Stats at Pro Football Reference

Edward John Anthony Rutkowski (born March 21, 1941) is an American former professional football player and politician. He played for the Buffalo Bills of the American Football League (AFL), earning AFL All-Star honors.

Rutkowski played college football for the Notre Dame Fighting Irish. He was an AFL All-Star in 1965, playing for Buffalo as a wide receiver, defensive back, punt and kickoff return man and backup quarterback from 1963 to 1968. In a famous Topps football card mix-up, Rutkowski was shown on two Buffalo Bills' football cards, his own, and mistakenly on the card for Ray Abruzzese. Rutkowski finished his playing career with seven games as a backup quarterback with the Montreal Alouettes of the Canadian Football League in 1969.

From 1972 to 1978 and again in 1990, Rutkowski served as a color commentator on the Bills' radio broadcasts. In 1979, he became the County Executive of Erie County, New York, succeeding Edward Regan, who stepped down to become New York State Comptroller. Rutkowski was elected to full terms in 1979 and 1983, following his one-year unexpired term, for a total of nine years in office. In 1987, Rutkowski was defeated for reelection by Assemblyman Dennis Gorski.

In 1995, Rutkowski was appointed by Governor George Pataki as deputy commissioner of the New York State Office of Parks, Recreation and Historic Preservation. In this post, he was charge of all state parks and recreations operations in Western New York, including Niagara Falls. He held the post for 12 years, until Pataki left office.

He was the fourth quarterback from a Buffalo professional football team to enter politics, following his teammate Jack Kemp, George Ratterman and Tommy Hughitt. Incidentally, both Kemp and Rutkowski were Republicans.

He is of Polish origin.

== See also ==
- List of American Football League players

Sporting positions
Preceded by Dick Rifenburg and Ralph Hubbell	Buffalo Bills color commentator 1971–1977	Succeeded by Stan Barron
Political offices
Preceded by Edward Regan	Erie County, New York County Executive; 1979 – 1987	Succeeded by Dennis Gorski
