= Charlie Brackins =

American football player (1932–1991)

No. 15
- Position: Quarterback

Personal information
- Born: January 12, 1932; Dallas, Texas, U.S.
- Died: June 1, 1991 (aged 59); Dallas, Texas, U.S.
- Listed height: 6 ft 2 in (1.88 m)
- Listed weight: 202 lb (92 kg)

Career information
- High school: Lincoln (Dallas)
- College: Prairie View A&M
- NFL draft: 1955: 16th round, 185th overall pick

Career history
- Green Bay Packers (1955)

Career NFL statistics
- Passing attempts: 2
- Passing completions: 0
- Completion percentage: 0.0%
- TD–INT: 0–0
- Passing yards: 0
- Passer rating: 39.6
- Stats at Pro Football Reference

Charlie "Choo Choo" Brackins (January 12, 1932 – June 1, 1991) was an American professional football player who was a quarterback for the Green Bay Packers of the National Football League (NFL) in 1955. He played college football for the Prairie View A&M Panthers. Brackins is considered to be one of the first black quarterbacks to play in the NFL.

== Biography ==
Brackins was born on January 12, 1932, in Dallas, Texas. He attended Lincoln High in Dallas.

== Professional career ==
He played college football at Prairie View A&M University in Prairie View, Texas, from 1951 to 1955. He was a three-year starter for head football coach Billy Nicks and led the Panthers to 33 victories in 37 games in the Southwestern Athletic Conference (SWAC). He was a big tall passer at 6 ft 2 in (1.88 m) and 205 pounds. Brackins was selected by the Green Bay Packers in the sixteenth round of the 1955 NFL draft, making him the first HBCU alumnus to play quarterback in the NFL. He played in only one game in during the 1955 season, in the closing minutes of a game against the Cleveland Browns on October 23, 1955. Green Bay lost the game, 41–10, and Brackins threw two incomplete passes. The Packers placed Brackins on waivers after that game. Brackins had tried out as a defensive back with other teams but he never got another chance to play in the league. Brackins died from cancer in 1991.

In 2013, Brackins was elected to the Black College Football Hall of Fame.

== See also ==
- Racial issues faced by black quarterbacks
