= List of Black starting NFL quarterbacks =

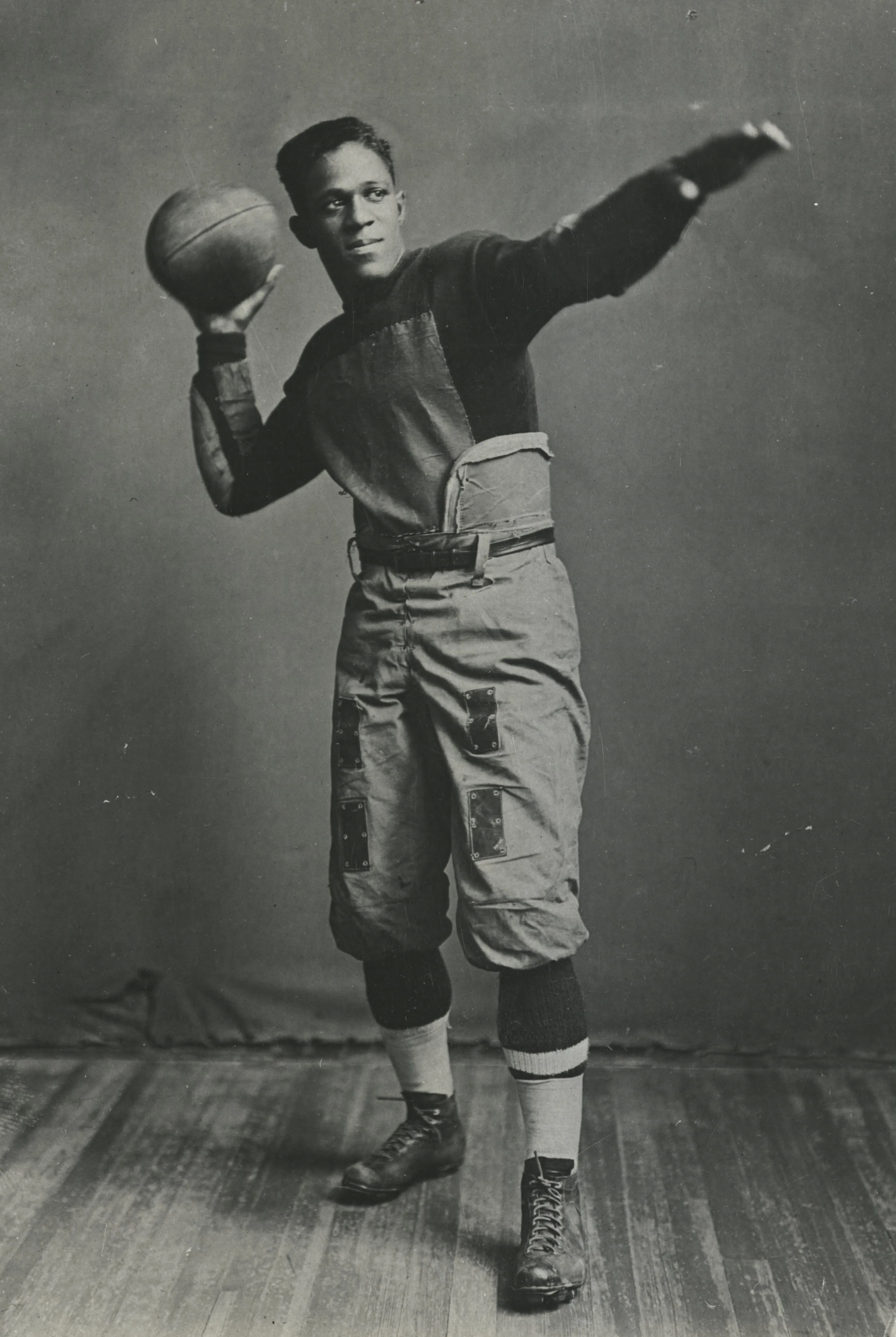
Fritz Pollard became the NFL's first Black quarterback in 1923

This list of Black starting NFL quarterbacks includes those who have started in a regular-season or post-season game in the National Football League (NFL). The quarterback is the leader of a team's offense, directing other players on the field. Some authors have contended that Black players have been excluded from playing quarterback in the NFL because of the belief that white players would not follow their leadership and the perception that Black quarterbacks lack intelligence, dependability, composure, character, or charisma. Promising Black quarterbacks at the high school and college levels were often transitioned at the professional level to other positions, such as running back or wide receiver. While a ban on Black players in the NFL ended in 1946, the quarterback position was among the last to be desegregated.

Although Black quarterbacks and other quarterbacks of color vary in physical size and playing style, racial stereotyping persists. A 2015 study found that even when controlling for various factors, Black quarterbacks are twice as likely to be "benched", or removed from play, as white quarterbacks. Other studies have found that sports broadcasters are more likely to attribute a Black quarterback's success to superior athletic attributes and a white quarterback's success to superior intellect. It was not until 2017, when the New York Giants started Geno Smith in place of the benched Eli Manning, that all 32 active NFL teams had started at least one Black quarterback. That year, nearly 70% of NFL players, but only 25% of starting quarterbacks, were Black. 16 of the league's 32 starting quarterbacks were Black at the start of the 2025 NFL season, the most in a single week in NFL history.

== Pre-Super Bowl era ==
Racial antagonism should have no place in football, but unhappily the millennium has not yet arrived. Unscrupulous opponents did their best to knock Brown's gritty colored star cold. They were out to 'get' Pollard and they weren't too particular with how they got him. No white man would have had to take the punishment Pollard did.

— The New York Sun reporting on a 1928 Brown University game

The quarterback position has changed over the years and did not exist in its modern form in the early 20th century. In the early days of football, quarterbacks were called upon to throw the ball, run the ball, and kick the ball; the forward pass was not adopted widely until the 1930s. However, tailbacks who played in the single-wing formation are "the equivalent of a modern-day quarterback" or "the closest thing to it."

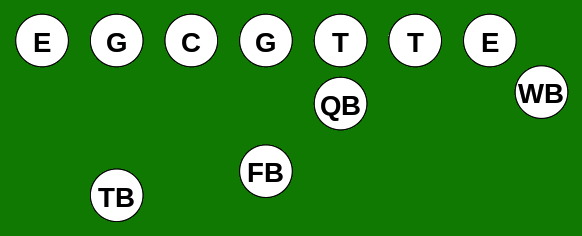
In single-wing formations, popular in the early 20th century, a play typically begins with the center (C) throwing the ball to the tailback (TB), while the quarterback (QB) is used as a blocker.

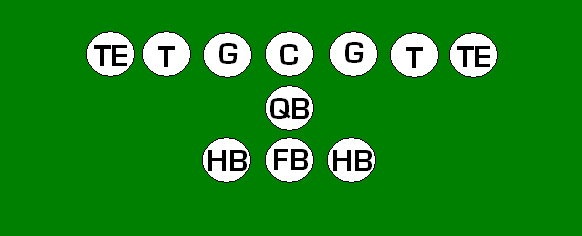
NFL rule changes in the 1930s led to a resurgence of the classic T formation, in which the quarterback (QB) lines up directly behind the center (C) to receive the ball in a hand-off. This led to a reduction in fumbles and the evolution of the quarterback from a blocker to a passer and leader of the offense.

Single-wing tailback Fritz Pollard, a key figure in the early days of the NFL, became the league's first Black quarterback when he started playing the position for the Hammond Pros in 1923. By that time, he had already become the first Black head coach in the NFL, and prior to his professional career, the first Black quarterback All-American and the first to appear in the Rose Bowl. Pollard faced racism throughout his career, including from his teammates. In college, fans were reported to sing "Bye Bye Blackbird" when he took the field. Pollard would sometimes have to enter the field through a separate gate, or be driven onto the field in a car for his own safety, in order to avoid fans who chanted "kill the nigger" and threw bottles and bricks at him. After retiring from football, Pollard started the first Black tabloid newspaper, the New York Independent News. In 2005, Pollard was inducted into the Pro Football Hall of Fame.

The demise of the competing American Football League (AFL) in the 1920s left a "glut of available white players eager to sign on with the NFL, rendering Black players expendable." In 1926, there were five Black players in the NFL, in 1927 only one. With the onset of the Great Depression in the 1930s, economic pressures led to a further deterioration of race relations, and minorities were often vilified and scapegoated. When the Chicago Cardinals signed Joe Lillard in 1932, the same year a rule change expanded the forward pass and Franklin Delano Roosevelt won the US presidency with 75% of the Black vote, he was the NFL's only Black player at the time. Lillard started 12 games with the Chicago Cardinals, and although he threw passes, ran the ball, kicked the ball, and returned punts, he was used sparingly as a quarterback.

1932 was also the year that segregationist George Preston Marshall founded the Boston Braves. The following year, Marshall renamed the Braves the Boston Redskins and brokered an NFL-wide ban on Black players. Joe Lillard was released, and by 1934, there were no Black players with NFL contracts. In 1937, Marshall moved the Redskins to the southern city of Washington, D.C., which was still segregated, renaming the team the Washington Redskins. Marshall's so-called "gentlemen's agreement" barring Black players from the NFL lasted until after World War II, when the All-America Football Conference (AAFC) launched in 1946 as an unsegregated competing league. NFL owners relented and lifted the ban, although Marshall nevertheless refused to sign any Black players to the Redskins until 1962, when he finally relented under threat from President John F. Kennedy to cancel the Redskins' 30-year stadium lease unless they integrated.

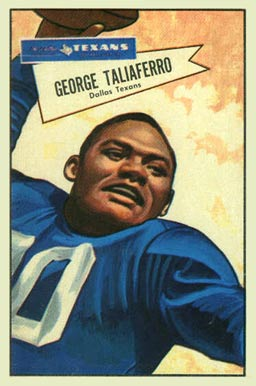
1952 football card depicting George Taliaferro, who became the first Black player drafted in the NFL in 1949, and went on to play quarterback and six other positions until 1955.

In 1949, George Taliaferro became the first Black player drafted into the NFL. Taliaferro had previously played college football for the Indiana Hoosiers. He missed the 1946 season when he was conscripted into the US Army but returned to lead the Hoosiers in both rushing and passing in 1948. The NFL's Chicago Bears drafted Taliaferro in 1949, but he had already signed a contract with the Los Angeles Dons in the AAFC. The LA Dons later folded, and several of its players joined the NFL, Taliaferro among them. He played an unprecedented seven positions during his career, including single-wing tailback or quarterback, more than any player in NFL history. Taliaferro retired in 1955.

Two other Black quarterbacks made brief appearances in the pre-Super Bowl NFL. Willie Thrower, "the first Black NFL quarterback of the modern mold", played for Michigan State in college before playing one professional game at quarterback for the Bears, in relief duty, on October 18, 1953. Charlie Brackins, the NFL's first Black quarterback to have graduated from a historically Black college or university (HBCU), played one game as quarterback for the Green Bay Packers in 1955, missed both of his pass attempts, and was released by the team before the next game.

First Black quarterbacks in the NFL (pre-Super Bowl era)
Years active	Quarterback	Team
1920–1926	Fritz Pollard	Akron Pros, Milwaukee Badgers, Hammond Pros, Providence Steam Rollers, Akron Indians
1932–1933	Joe Lillard	Chicago Cardinals
1950–1955	George Taliaferro	New York Yanks, Dallas Texans, Baltimore Colts, Philadelphia Eagles
1953	Willie Thrower	Chicago Bears
1955	Charlie Brackins	Green Bay Packers
Source: Howard 2014

== First by team (Super Bowl era) ==
Of the dozens of quarterbacks on the rosters of the 26 major league professional teams in the United States, Marlin is the only one whose skin is black ... But Marlin is not mainly interested in proving he can run the ball. What he's trying to show them is that a black man can run the ball club.

— The Spokesman-Review, 1968, writing about Marlin Briscoe (Note: Briscoe added, "The black player may have to go through some things ... But I'm talking about the average player, not my particular case. On this team, I didn't have that problem. There wasn't any racial problem.")

In 1967, the American Football League agreed to merge with the NFL, becoming the American Football Conference, with most former NFL teams forming the National Football Conference. Although the first championship game between the two conferences, known as the Super Bowl, was held in 1967, the merger was not completed until 1970. Marlin Briscoe played for the Denver Broncos, an AFL team, in 1968, and is considered the first Black quarterback to start a game in the modern NFL. Briscoe started his rookie year as a defensive back, but when the starting quarterback was injured, Briscoe was called to fill in. He started the last five games of the season, during which he threw 14 touchdown passes and was a candidate for Rookie of the Year. Nevertheless, he was released after the season, and later converted to a receiver.

First Black starting quarterback by NFL team (Super Bowl era)
No.	Date	Team	Quarterback
1	October 6, 1968	Denver Broncos	Marlin Briscoe
2	September 14, 1969	Buffalo Bills	James Harris
3	December 3, 1973	Pittsburgh Steelers	Joe Gilliam
4	October 20, 1974	Los Angeles Rams	James Harris
5	December 15, 1975	New York Jets	J. J. Jones
6	October 24, 1976	Tampa Bay Buccaneers	Parnell Dickinson
7	September 18, 1977	Los Angeles Chargers (Note: The Chargers were based in San Diego, California at the time.)	James Harris
8	November 20, 1977	Cleveland Browns	Dave Mays
9	September 16, 1979	Chicago Bears	Vince Evans
10	September 2, 1984	Tennessee Titans (Note: The Titans were based in Houston, Texas at the time, playing as the Houston Oilers.)	Warren Moon
11	September 15, 1985	Philadelphia Eagles	Randall Cunningham
12	December 21, 1986	Dallas Cowboys	Reggie Collier
13	September 20, 1987	Washington Commanders (Note: The team was known as the Redskins at the time.)	Doug Williams
14	October 4, 1987	Las Vegas Raiders (Note: The Raiders were based in Los Angeles, California at the time.)	Vince Evans
15	October 1, 1989	Detroit Lions	Rodney Peete
16	September 4, 1994	Minnesota Vikings	Warren Moon
17	October 30, 1994	Cincinnati Bengals	Jeff Blake
18	September 7, 1997	Seattle Seahawks	Warren Moon
19	October 31, 1999	Baltimore Ravens	Tony Banks
20	September 3, 2000	New Orleans Saints	Jeff Blake
21	November 26, 2000	Kansas City Chiefs	Warren Moon
22	November 11, 2001	Atlanta Falcons	Michael Vick
23	September 8, 2002	Carolina Panthers	Rodney Peete
24	October 20, 2002	Miami Dolphins	Ray Lucas
25	December 29, 2002	Jacksonville Jaguars	David Garrard
26	September 7, 2003	Arizona Cardinals	Jeff Blake
27	November 2, 2003	Houston Texans	Tony Banks
28	October 31, 2010	San Francisco 49ers	Troy Smith
29	November 10, 2013	Green Bay Packers	Seneca Wallace
30	January 3, 2016	Indianapolis Colts	Josh Freeman
31	September 22, 2016	New England Patriots	Jacoby Brissett
32	December 3, 2017	New York Giants	Geno Smith
Source: Johnson 2017, Dator 2017, Gartland 2016, Ruiz 2016

== NFL MVPs ==
Four Black quarterbacks have won the NFL MVP award a total of six times. Patrick Mahomes was the first to win it multiple times, with Lamar Jackson being the second.

Season	Player	Team
2003	Steve McNair	Tennessee Titans
2015	Cam Newton	Carolina Panthers
2018	Patrick Mahomes	Kansas City Chiefs
2019	Lamar Jackson	Baltimore Ravens
2022	Patrick Mahomes	Kansas City Chiefs
2023	Lamar Jackson	Baltimore Ravens

== Playoff starters ==
In 1974, James Harris became the first Black quarterback to start and win an NFL playoff game. Midway through the 1976 season, Harris was benched by his team's owner, Carroll Rosenbloom, who explained his decision by telling the press, "Unfortunately, the quarterback position is controversial enough without adding the color element." After retiring, Harris became an executive for four teams and earned a Super Bowl ring in 2000 with the Baltimore Ravens.

Warren Moon, who made seven playoff appearances, was the first Black quarterback elected to the Pro Football Hall of Fame. During his NFL career (1984–2000), he was the first Black quarterback on four different teams.

The 2023–2024 playoffs featured six starting Black quarterbacks, the most in NFL history. (Note: The six quarterbacks were Jalen Hurts (Philadelphia Eagles), Lamar Jackson (Baltimore Ravens), Jordan Love (Green Bay Packers), Patrick Mahomes (Kansas City Chiefs), Dak Prescott (Dallas Cowboys), and C. J. Stroud (Houston Texans).)

In the 2024–2025 playoffs, there were seven starting Black quarterbacks, the most in NFL history, and this included three of the four starting QBs in the Conference Championship round.

- James Harris
- Randall Cunningham
- Daunte Culpepper
- Aaron Brooks
- Steve McNair
- Quincy Carter
- Doug Williams
- Kordell Stewart
- Warren Moon
- Shaun King
- Michael Vick
- David Garrard
- Donovan McNabb
- Cam Newton
- Robert Griffin III
- Russell Wilson
- Colin Kaepernick
- Teddy Bridgewater
- Dak Prescott
- Tyrod Taylor
- Deshaun Watson
- Lamar Jackson
- Patrick Mahomes
- Jalen Hurts
- C. J. Stroud
- Jordan Love

=== Most playoff wins ===
Player	Team(s)	Wins
Patrick Mahomes	Kansas City Chiefs	15
Russell Wilson*	Seattle Seahawks	9
Donovan McNabb*	Philadelphia Eagles	9
Jalen Hurts	Philadelphia Eagles	6
Steve McNair*	Tennessee Titans	5
Kordell Stewart*	Pittsburgh Steelers	5

*Indicates a quarterback who played for other teams but did not win a playoff game for them.

== Super Bowl starters ==
In 1982, a players' strike cut the NFL season short to nine games. When a second strike occurred in 1987, the NFL, not wanting to lose games, hired replacement players. That year, Black quarterbacks in the league tripled in number.

On September 20, 1987, Doug Williams became the first Black quarterback to start a game for the Washington Redskins, the team that had been segregated for so long by its former owner, George Preston Marshall. Before starting for Washington, Williams had been drafted by the Tampa Bay Buccaneers and led them to three playoff appearances in three years. Williams joined the Redskins in the 1986 season, when he threw only one pass (incomplete). He played backup for most of the 1987 season, but outperformed the first-string quarterback, and was made starting quarterback for the playoffs. On January 31, 1988, he became the first Black quarterback to start in the Super Bowl, and a few hours later, the first to win it, ironically wearing the Super Bowl ring of the last team in the league to integrate Black players. Williams threw for 340 yards and four touchdowns–Super Bowl records at the time–and was named Super Bowl MVP. He was benched the next season and retired shortly thereafter.

Kansas City Chiefs quarterback Patrick Mahomes was the seventh Black quarterback to start a Super Bowl. The combined Super Bowl records of Black quarterbacks is 5–7. Williams, Mahomes and Hurts are to date the only players to win the Super Bowl MVP award. Only Mahomes and Seattle Seahawks quarterback Russell Wilson, Philadelphia Eagles quarterback Jalen Hurts have started multiple Super Bowls. In 2023, Mahomes became the first to start three Super Bowls. With the Chiefs' win, Mahomes became the first Black quarterback to win two Super Bowls, as well as to win two MVP awards. The following year, he became the first Black quarterback to repeat as Super Bowl champion.

Super Bowl LVII also marked the first time that both Super Bowl starting quarterbacks were Black: Patrick Mahomes started for the Kansas City Chiefs, while Jalen Hurts started for the Philadelphia Eagles. The Eagles are the first team to have two different Black starting quarterbacks start a Super Bowl.

Black quarterbacks in the Super Bowl
Quarterback	Result/Super Bowl	Team
Doug Williams	Won Super Bowl XXII (MVP)	Washington Redskins
Steve McNair	Lost Super Bowl XXXIV	Tennessee Titans
Donovan McNabb	Lost Super Bowl XXXIX	Philadelphia Eagles
Colin Kaepernick	Lost Super Bowl XLVII	San Francisco 49ers
Russell Wilson	Won Super Bowl XLVIII; Lost Super Bowl XLIX	Seattle Seahawks
Cam Newton	Lost Super Bowl 50	Carolina Panthers
Patrick Mahomes	Won Super Bowl LIV (MVP); Lost Super Bowl LV; Won Super Bowl LVII (MVP); Won Super Bowl LVIII (MVP); Lost Super Bowl LIX	Kansas City Chiefs
Jalen Hurts	Lost Super Bowl LVII; Won Super Bowl LIX (MVP)	Philadelphia Eagles

Gallery

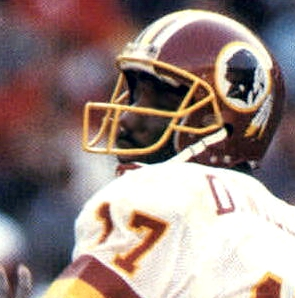
Doug Williams

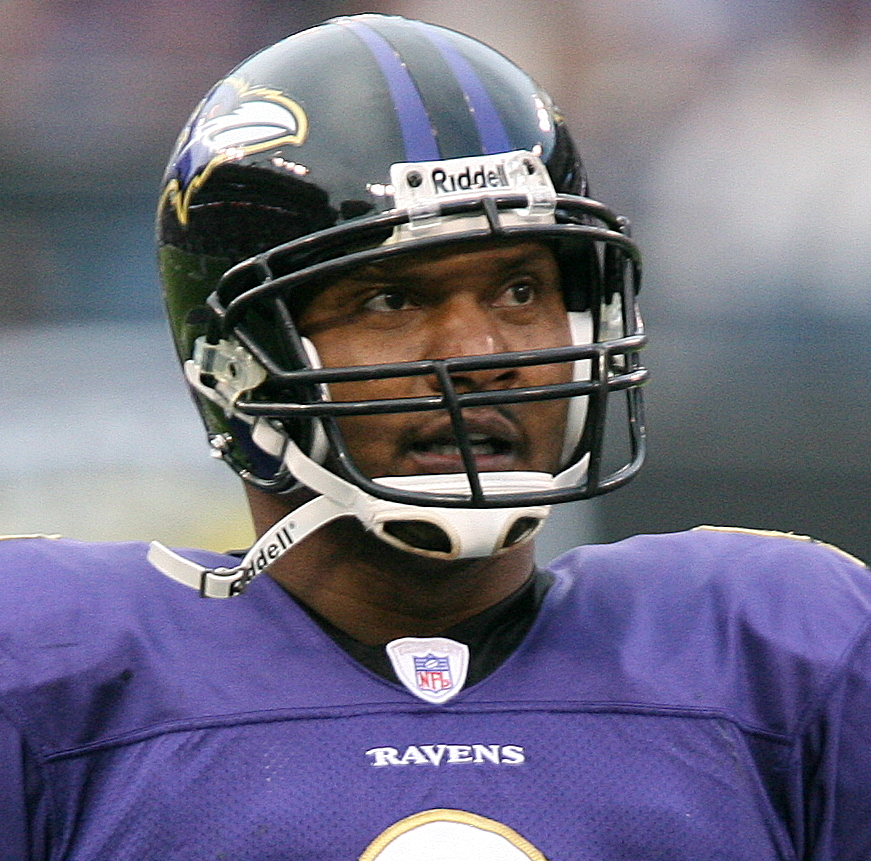
Steve McNair

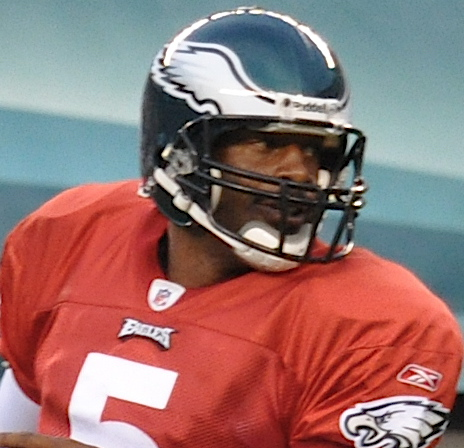
Donovan McNabb

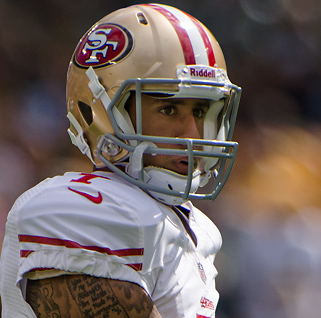
Colin Kaepernick

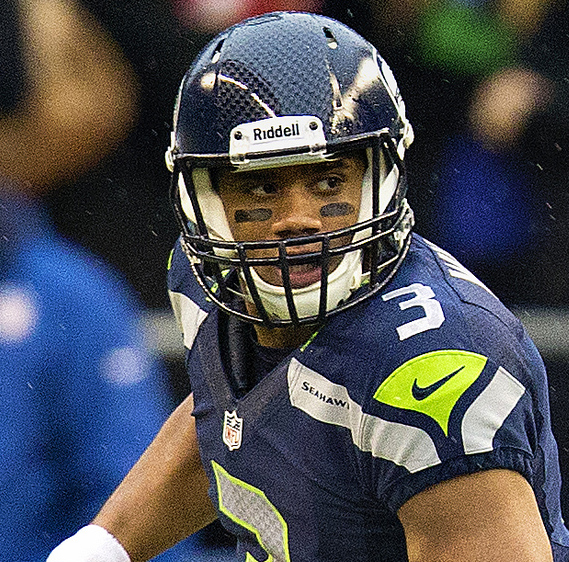
Russell Wilson

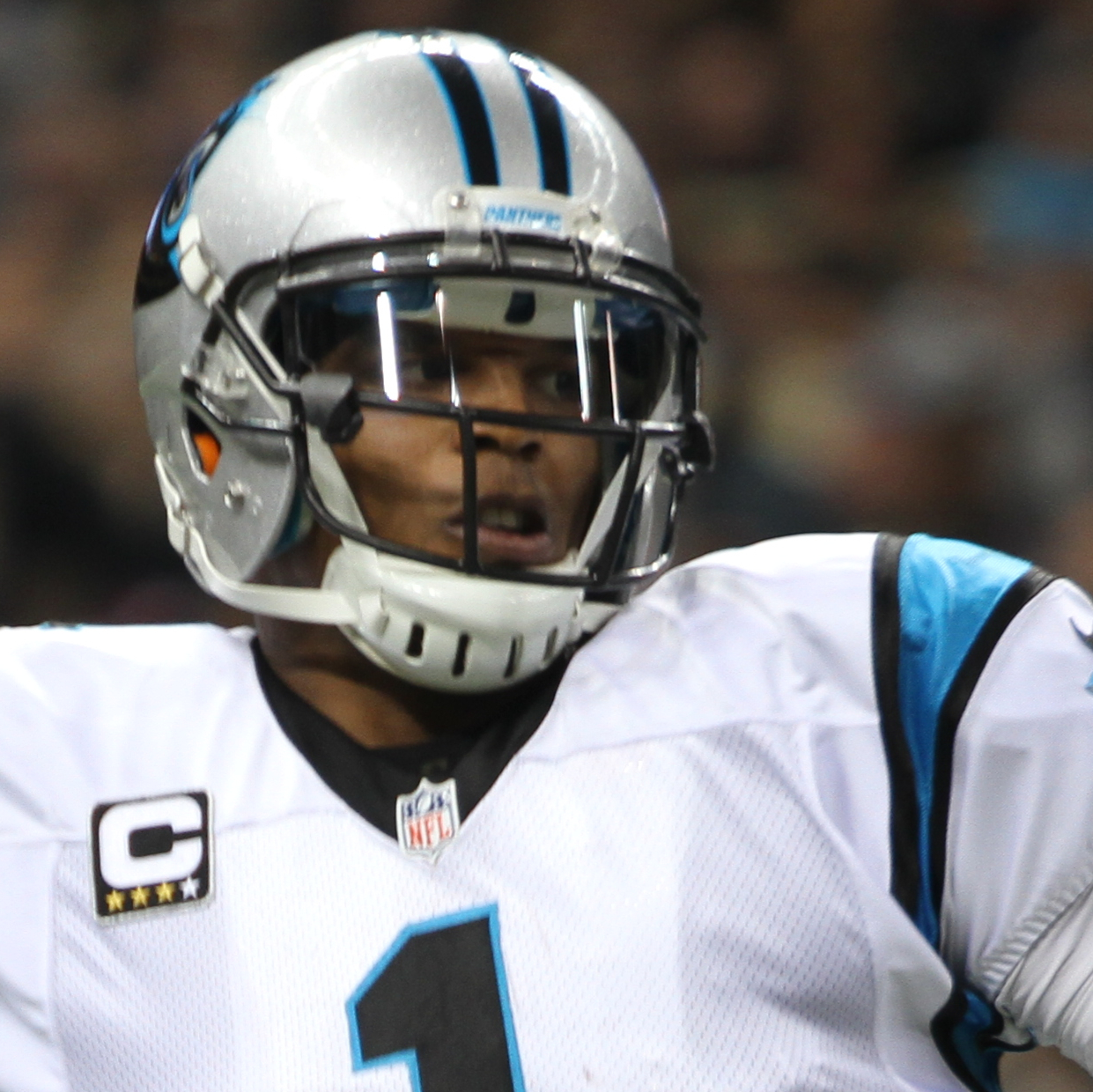
Cam Newton

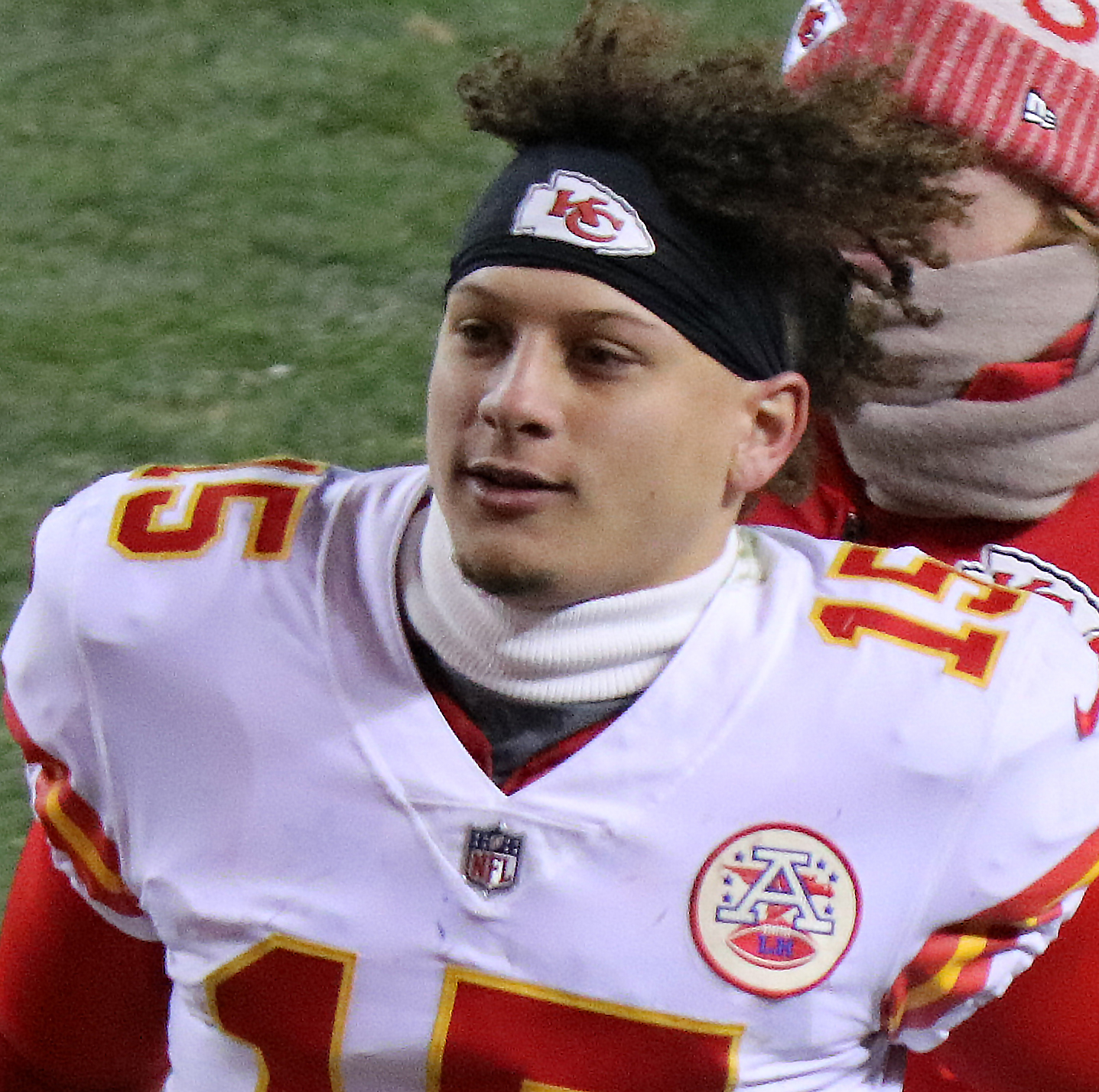
Patrick Mahomes

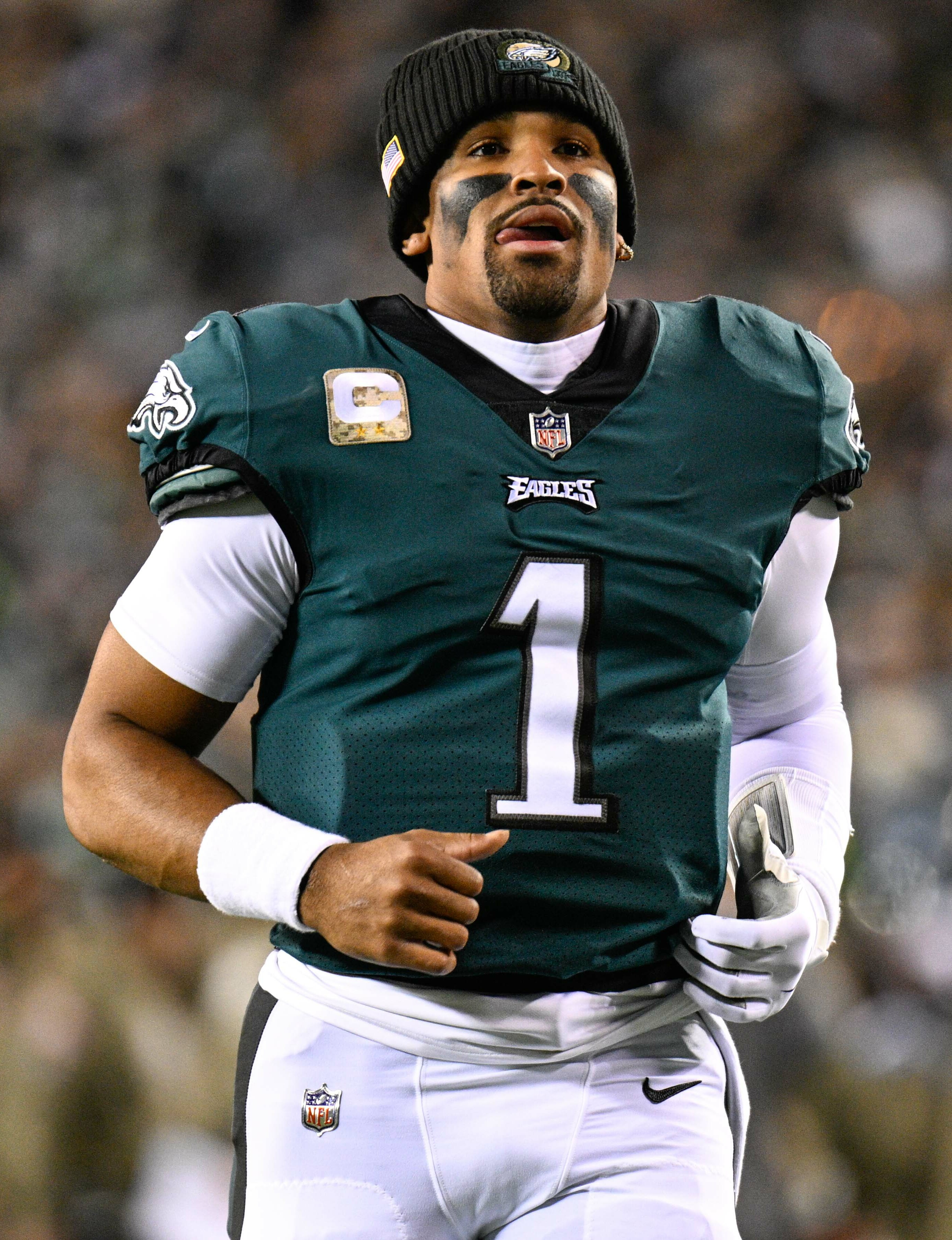
Jalen Hurts

== Full list ==
In 2000, Doug Williams, Warren Moon, Marlin Briscoe and James Harris formed the Field Generals, a fraternity for Black quarterbacks.

Black starting quarterbacks in the NFL
Quarterback	Years active	Team	Source
Fritz Pollard	1920–1926	Akron Pros, Milwaukee Badgers, Hammond Pros, Providence Steam Rollers, Akron Indians	
Joe Lillard	1932–1933	Chicago Cardinals	
George Taliaferro	1950–1955	New York Yanks, Dallas Texans, Baltimore Colts, Philadelphia Eagles	
Marlin Briscoe	1968	Denver Broncos	
James Harris	1969–1981	Buffalo Bills, Los Angeles Rams, San Diego Chargers	
Joe Gilliam	1972–1975	Pittsburgh Steelers	
Dave Mays	1976–1978	Cleveland Browns, Buffalo Bills	
J. J. Jones	1975	New York Jets	
Parnell Dickinson	1976	Tampa Bay Buccaneers	
Vince Evans	1977–1983, 1987–1995	Chicago Bears, Los Angeles Raiders/Oakland Raiders	
Doug Williams	1978–1982, 1986–1989	Tampa Bay Buccaneers, Washington Redskins	
Warren Moon	1984–2000	Houston Oilers, Minnesota Vikings, Seattle Seahawks, Kansas City Chiefs	
Randall Cunningham	1985–2001	Philadelphia Eagles, Minnesota Vikings, Dallas Cowboys, Baltimore Ravens	
Reggie Collier	1986–1987	Dallas Cowboys, Pittsburgh Steelers	
Willie Totten	1987	Buffalo Bills	
Rodney Peete	1989–2004	Detroit Lions, Dallas Cowboys, Philadelphia Eagles, Washington Redskins, Oakland Raiders, Carolina Panthers	
Andre Ware	1990–1993	Detroit Lions	
Major Harris	1990	Los Angeles Raiders	
Jeff Blake	1992, 1994–2005	New York Jets, Cincinnati Bengals, New Orleans Saints, Baltimore Ravens, Arizona Cardinals, Philadelphia Eagles, Chicago Bears	
Steve McNair	1995–2007	Houston Oilers/Tennessee Titans, Baltimore Ravens	
Kordell Stewart	1995–2005	Pittsburgh Steelers, Chicago Bears, Baltimore Ravens	
Tony Banks	1996–2001, 2003–2005	St. Louis Rams, Baltimore Ravens, Washington Redskins, Houston Texans	
Ray Lucas	1996–2003	New England Patriots, New York Jets, Miami Dolphins, Baltimore Ravens	
Charlie Batch	1998–2001, 2003, 2005–2012	Detroit Lions, Pittsburgh Steelers	
Donovan McNabb	1999–2011	Philadelphia Eagles, Washington Redskins, Minnesota Vikings	
Akili Smith	1999–2002	Cincinnati Bengals	
Daunte Culpepper	2000–2009	Minnesota Vikings, Miami Dolphins, Oakland Raiders, Detroit Lions	
Aaron Brooks	1999–2006	Green Bay Packers, New Orleans Saints, Oakland Raiders	
Anthony Wright	1999–2001, 2003, 2005–2007	Pittsburgh Steelers, Dallas Cowboys, Baltimore Ravens, Cincinnati Bengals, New York Giants	
Shaun King	1999–2004	Tampa Bay Buccaneers, Arizona Cardinals	
Spergon Wynn	2000–2001	Cleveland Browns, Minnesota Vikings	
Jarious Jackson	2000–2003	Denver Broncos	
Henry Burris	2001–2002	Green Bay Packers, Chicago Bears	
Quincy Carter	2001–2004	Dallas Cowboys, New York Jets	
Michael Vick	2001–2006, 2009–2015	Atlanta Falcons, Philadelphia Eagles, New York Jets, Pittsburgh Steelers	
Rohan Davey	2002–2005	New England Patriots, Arizona Cardinals	
David Garrard	2002–2010	Jacksonville Jaguars, New York Jets	
Byron Leftwich	2003–2007, 2009, 2012	Jacksonville Jaguars, Atlanta Falcons, Pittsburgh Steelers, Tampa Bay Buccaneers	
Seneca Wallace	2006, 2008–2011, 2013	Seattle Seahawks, Cleveland Browns, New Orleans Saints, San Francisco 49ers, Green Bay Packers	
Quinn Gray	2004–2008	Jacksonville Jaguars, Kansas City Chiefs	
Cleo Lemon	2006–2007	San Diego Chargers, Miami Dolphins, Jacksonville Jaguars	
Jason Campbell	2005–2013	Washington Redskins, Oakland Raiders, Chicago Bears, Cleveland Browns	
Vince Young	2006–2013	Tennessee Titans, Philadelphia Eagles	
Tarvaris Jackson	2006–2013	Minnesota Vikings, Seattle Seahawks	
JaMarcus Russell	2007–2009	Oakland Raiders	
Troy Smith	2007, 2010	Baltimore Ravens, San Francisco 49ers, Pittsburgh Steelers	
Dennis Dixon	2009–2010	Pittsburgh Steelers	
Josh Johnson	2009, 2011, 2018, 2021, –present	Tampa Bay Buccaneers, Cleveland Browns, Cincinnati Bengals, Washington Redskins / Commanders, Baltimore Ravens	
Pat White	2009	Miami Dolphins	
Josh Freeman	2009–2013, 2015	Tampa Bay Buccaneers, Minnesota Vikings, Indianapolis Colts	
Joe Webb	2010–2011, 2017	Minnesota Vikings, Carolina Panthers, Buffalo Bills	
Thad Lewis	2012–2013	Cleveland Browns, Buffalo Bills	
Cam Newton	2011–2021	Carolina Panthers, New England Patriots	
Colin Kaepernick	2011–2016	San Francisco 49ers	
Terrelle Pryor	2012–2013	Oakland Raiders	
Robert Griffin III	2012–2014, 2016, 2019–2020	Washington Redskins, Cleveland Browns, Baltimore Ravens	
Russell Wilson	2012–2025	Seattle Seahawks, Denver Broncos, Pittsburgh Steelers, New York Giants	
EJ Manuel	2013–2017	Buffalo Bills, Oakland Raiders	
Geno Smith	2013–2014, 2016–2017, 2021–present	New York Jets, New York Giants, Seattle Seahawks, Las Vegas Raiders	
Teddy Bridgewater	2014–2015, 2018–2024	Minnesota Vikings, New Orleans Saints, Carolina Panthers, Denver Broncos, Miami Dolphins, Detroit Lions	
Tyrod Taylor	2015–2018, 2020–2021, 2023, 2025–present	Buffalo Bills, Cleveland Browns, Los Angeles Chargers, Houston Texans, New York Giants, New York Jets	
Jameis Winston	2015–2019, 2021–2022, 2024–present	Tampa Bay Buccaneers, New Orleans Saints, Cleveland Browns, New York Giants	
Dak Prescott	2016–present	Dallas Cowboys	
Jacoby Brissett	2016–2017, 2019, 2021–2022, 2024–present	New England Patriots, Indianapolis Colts, Miami Dolphins, Cleveland Browns, Arizona Cardinals	
Brett Hundley	2017	Green Bay Packers	
Deshaun Watson	2017–2020, 2022–2024	Houston Texans, Cleveland Browns	
DeShone Kizer	2017	Cleveland Browns	
Patrick Mahomes	2017–present	Kansas City Chiefs	
Lamar Jackson	2018–present	Baltimore Ravens	
Kyler Murray	2019–present	Arizona Cardinals, Minnesota Vikings	
Dwayne Haskins	2019–2020	Washington Redskins / Football Team	
P. J. Walker	2020, 2023	Carolina Panthers, Cleveland Browns	
Jalen Hurts	2020–present	Philadelphia Eagles	
Justin Fields	2021–present	Chicago Bears, Pittsburgh Steelers, New York Jets	
Trey Lance	2021–2022, 2024–present	San Francisco 49ers, Los Angeles Chargers	
Jordan Love	2021, 2023–present	Green Bay Packers	
Tyler Huntley	2021–present	Baltimore Ravens, Miami Dolphins	
Malik Willis	2022, 2024–present	Tennessee Titans, Green Bay Packers	
Bryce Perkins	2022	Los Angeles Rams	
Desmond Ridder	2022–2024	Atlanta Falcons, Las Vegas Raiders	
Joshua Dobbs	2022–2024	Tennessee Titans, Arizona Cardinals, Minnesota Vikings, San Francisco 49ers	
Anthony Brown	2022	Baltimore Ravens	
Anthony Richardson	2023–2024	Indianapolis Colts	
C. J. Stroud	2023–present	Houston Texans	
Bryce Young	2023–present	Carolina Panthers	
Dorian Thompson-Robinson	2023–2024	Cleveland Browns	
Jaren Hall	2023	Minnesota Vikings	
Caleb Williams	2024–present	Chicago Bears	
Jayden Daniels	2024–present	Washington Commanders	
Spencer Rattler	2024–present	New Orleans Saints	
Michael Penix Jr.	2024–present	Atlanta Falcons	
Cam Ward	2025–present	Tennessee Titans	
Shedeur Sanders	2025–present	Cleveland Browns	
Chris Oladokun	2025–present	Kansas City Chiefs	
Only seasons and teams with game starts are listed.

== See also ==
American football:

- List of African-American sports firsts
- History of African Americans in the Canadian Football League
- Black college football national championship
- Rooney Rule
- U.S. national anthem kneeling protests

Other sports:

- List of first black players for European national football teams (association football)
- Baseball color line
  - List of first black MLB players
  - Negro league baseball
    - List of Negro league baseball players
- Black players in ice hockey
  - Race and ethnicity in the NHL
    - List of black NHL players
- Race and ethnicity in the NBA (basketball)
- Black participation in college basketball
- Rugby union and apartheid
- 1968 Olympics Black Power salute
