= Marlin Briscoe =

American football player (1945–2022)

- Briscoe in 2016

No. 15, 86, 43, 88
- Positions: Quarterback, Wide receiver

Personal information
- Born: September 10, 1945; Oakland, California, U.S.
- Died: June 27, 2022 (aged 76); Norwalk, California, U.S.
- Listed height: 5 ft 11 in (1.80 m)
- Listed weight: 178 lb (81 kg)

Career information
- High school: Omaha South (Omaha, Nebraska)
- College: Omaha
- NFL draft: 1968: 14th round, 357th overall pick

Career history
- Denver Broncos (1968); Buffalo Bills (1969–1971); Miami Dolphins (1972–1974); San Diego Chargers (1975); Detroit Lions (1975); New England Patriots (1976)

Awards and highlights
- 2× Super Bowl champion (VII, VIII); Pro Bowl (1970)

Career NFL/AFL statistics
- Receptions: 224
- Receiving yards: 3,537
- Receiving touchdowns: 30
- Passing attempts: 233
- Passing completions: 97
- Completion percentage: 41.6%
- TD–INT: 14–14
- Passing yards: 1,697
- Passer rating: 62.1
- Stats at Pro Football Reference
- College Football Hall of Fame

Marlin Oliver Briscoe (September 10, 1945 – June 27, 2022), nicknamed "the Magician", was an American professional football player who was a quarterback and wide receiver in the American Football League (AFL) and National Football League (NFL). In October 1968, after being selected by the AFL's Denver Broncos, he became the first black starting quarterback in professional football, and threw 14 touchdown passes as a rookie, establishing a Broncos record which stood until 2024. He played professionally for nine years.

== Early life ==
Briscoe was born in Oakland, California, on September 10, 1945. He relocated to Omaha, Nebraska, with his mother when he was five years old after his parents divorced. He attended Omaha South High School, where he starred in several sports and played at running back for a football team that won the Nebraska state championship. He also played tennis in high school.

== College career ==
After graduating from high school, Briscoe played college football at Omaha University from 1963 to 1967. One of his summer jobs at that time was at the Armour slaughterhouse in South Omaha. The year after he graduated, his college's name was changed to University of Nebraska at Omaha.

Playing at quarterback, Briscoe led his team to a 27–11 record and three conference titles. He left with 22 school records, including completion percentage (55%), passing yards (4,935), touchdown passes (52), and total offensive yards (6,253). Briscoe was inducted into the College Football Hall of Fame in 2016.

== Professional career ==
Briscoe was 5 ft 10 in (1.78 m) and 177 pounds (80 kg) when the AFL's Denver Broncos selected him in the fourteenth round of the 1968 draft at age 22. The Broncos intended to convert him to cornerback, but Briscoe had negotiated for a chance to compete for the quarterback position.

On September 29, 1968, starter Steve Tensi suffered a broken collarbone, and backup Joe DiVito was spotty. Head coach Lou Saban summoned Briscoe from the sidelines in the fourth quarter against the Boston Patriots to give him a try. Briscoe's first play was a 22-yard completion. On his second series he orchestrated an 80-yard touchdown drive. He completed a 21-yard pass and ran for 38 more himself, carrying it the last 12 yards for the score.

A week later, on October 6, Briscoe started against the Cincinnati Bengals to become the first starting African-American quarterback in the AFL. He struggled statistically, completing only 4 of 11 pass attempts for 37 yards and no scores. However, in the following game against the San Diego Chargers, Briscoe came off the bench to complete 17 of 30 pass attempts for 237 yards, three TDs, and 2 INTs, while rushing for 68 yards. On November 24 against the Buffalo BIlls, Briscoe got his second start, and threw four touchdown passes (tied with Don Breaux and Bo Nix for the Broncos rookie record) and 335 yards, a team rookie record that stood until John Elway broke it in 1983. Including the Buffalo game, Briscoe started the last four games of the Broncos' 1968 season. In that season, Briscoe threw 14 touchdown passes (in just five starts), which stood as the Broncos rookie record for 55 years until surpassed by Nix in 2024. He threw 13 interceptions, completed 41.5 percent of his passes, and averaged 7.1 yards per attempt. His 17.1 yards per completion in 1968 led the American Football League, and is tied for 28th highest all-time. He also ran for 308 yards and three touchdowns.

Before the 1969 season started, Briscoe, still determined to play quarterback, discovered that head coach Saban intended to use Pete Liske as the starter, so he asked to be released. He went to the AFL's Buffalo Bills where he was turned into a receiver, since the Bills already had superstar Jack Kemp, former Pro Bowler Tom Flores, and James Harris, another black quarterback with a more prototypical 6-foot-4 and 210-pound frame. Briscoe led Buffalo in touchdown catches in each of his three seasons there and in receptions twice. In 1970, he was in the top two in receptions and receiving yards and became an All-Pro.

After the AFL-NFL merger, Briscoe played in the National Football League from 1970 though 1976, mostly with American Football Conference teams. In 1971, the Bills traded him to the Miami Dolphins for the first-round draft pick used to take Joe Delamielleure, who developed as a Hall of Fame guard.

Briscoe went on to win a pair of Super Bowls. Briscoe led the undefeated 1972 team with four touchdown receptions and was the leading receiver on the Dolphins in 1973, catching more passes than future Pro Football Hall of Famer, Paul Warfield.

Briscoe made stops with the San Diego Chargers and Detroit Lions, before ending his career in 1976 with the New England Patriots; he had ten receptions for 136 yards and one touchdown in 14 regular season games for the Patriots in 1976. Briscoe caught a 16-yard touchdown pass from Steve Grogan in the Patriots 48–17 rout of the Oakland Raiders at Schaefer Stadium on October 3, 1976, which was the Raiders' sole loss that season. As a rookie, Briscoe was intercepted by Boston Patriots AFL All Star Defensive Back Leroy Mitchell in Denver's 35–14 rout of the Patriots at Fenway Park on November 3, 1968, making him the only player to have been intercepted by a Patriot player and later to have caught a touchdown as a Patriot receiver.

== Retirement and legacy ==
He was one of the fifteen plaintiffs in Mackey v. National Football League in which Judge Earl R. Larson declared that the Rozelle rule was a violation of antitrust laws on December 30, 1975.

Upon retirement from professional sports, Briscoe moved to Los Angeles. He became established as a successful financial broker, dealing in municipal bonds. Briscoe became addicted to cocaine, but recovered after extensive rehab. In the 21st century, he worked as the director of the Boys and Girls Club in Long Beach, California before retiring. He founded a football camp for children.

A biopic film titled The Magician, based on Briscoe's life, has been under development for several years. Canadian actor Lyriq Bent has been approached to portray Briscoe in the film. In 2016, the University of Nebraska Omaha, Briscoe's alma mater, honored him with a statue of him.

== Personal life ==
Briscoe's three marriages ended in divorce. He had two children: Angela and Rebecca.

Briscoe died on June 27, 2022, at a hospital in Norwalk, California. He was 76, and had developed pneumonia prior to his death, having been hospitalized for circulation issues in his legs.

== See also ==
- List of American Football League players
- Racial issues faced by black quarterbacks
