= Racial issues faced by Black quarterbacks =

Controversy in American football

In gridiron football and its variants, American football and Canadian football, the quarterback position is often considered the most important on the team. While there have been a growing number of players of African or minority descent throughout the history of collegiate and professional football, Black players have historically faced difficulty in landing and retaining quarterback roles.

Some Black quarterbacks claim to have experienced bias towards or against them due to their race. Black players as a whole are disproportionately overrepresented in the NFL, being only ~13% of the U.S. population yet 67% of NFL players are Black, with 17% of quarterbacks being Black. (As of late 2025, 50% of starting Quarterbacks in the NFL are African American.)

== History ==
Since the earliest days of professional and college football, the number of Black players, let alone quarterbacks, has been on the rise. The first Black quarterback to start professionally was Bernie Custis for the Hamilton Tiger-Cats of the Canadian Football League in 1951. The first two in the United States were Marlin Briscoe and James Harris, both of the American Football League, in 1968 and 1969, respectively. (Note: Willie Thrower played a game for the Chicago Bears of the NFL in 1953. While he did not start, he was the first Black player exclusively listed as a quarterback to see playing time in the NFL. Prior Black players such as Fritz Pollard, Joe Lillard and George Taliaferro had taken snaps at quarterback but were officially listed at other positions) The AFL was known to be more tolerant towards Black players than the rival National Football League, which had harbored racist tendencies under the influence of Washington Redskins owner George Preston Marshall until the 1960s. The two leagues eventually merged to form the current NFL in 1970.

The CFL was more welcoming to Black quarterbacks than its American counterparts during the mid-twentieth century. By the 1970s, Black starting quarterbacks were commonplace and included players such as Conredge Holloway, who was also the first Black quarterback to start in the SEC, for the Tennessee Volunteers whom he led to three straight bowl games. Holloway was drafted into the NFL by the New England Patriots, but he was drafted as a defensive back not a quarterback. As such Holloway chose to play in Canada where he could play quarterback and had a very successful career including being on the roster of the championship teams of the 64th Grey Cup and the 71st Grey Cup, as well as be chosen as an all-star and winning the CFL equivalent of league MVP in 1982. Warren Moon also played in the CFL and won five Grey Cup championships in Canada before coming to play in the NFL. Moon's success largely broke the stereotype that Blacks could not succeed as quarterbacks, which ushered more prominent Black quarterbacks into the NFL starting in the 1980s.

In 1971, 3% of quarterbacks in the NFL who threw at least 100 passes in the season were black, but by 2001 this number had risen to 35%. The 1999 NFL draft was notable as eight out of thirteen quarterbacks selected that year were Black. They include Donovan McNabb, Akili Smith, and Daunte Culpepper, who were selected in the first round. Michael Vick, who was drafted two years later in 2001, became the first Black quarterback taken with the first overall pick in the NFL draft. During the 2013 season, 67 percent of NFL players were African American (Black people make up 13 percent of the US population), yet only 17 percent of quarterbacks were; 82 percent of quarterbacks were white.

In 2017, the New York Giants benched longtime quarterback Eli Manning in favor of Geno Smith, who was declared the starter for one week. The Giants were the last team never to field a Black starting quarterback during an NFL season. Though progress has evidently been made, a 2015 study showed that Black quarterbacks were still twice as likely to be benched as their white counterparts.

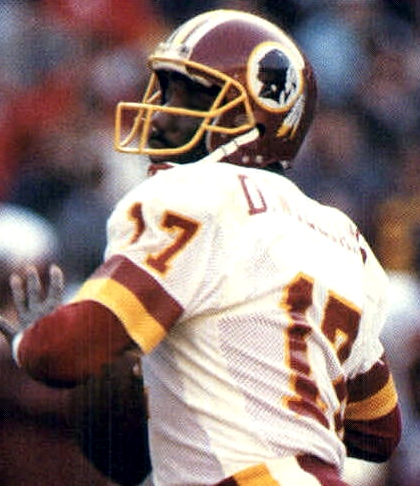
Doug Williams became the first Black quarterback to start a Super Bowl; he would additionally win his start in 1988

Since the inception of the game, only four quarterbacks with known Black ancestry have led their team to a Super Bowl victory: Doug Williams in 1988, Russell Wilson, who is multiracial, in 2014, Patrick Mahomes (biracial) in 2020, 2023, and 2024 and Jalen Hurts in 2025. Other black quarterbacks to start in a Super Bowl include Steve McNair in 2000, McNabb in 2005, Colin Kaepernick (who is multiracial), in 2013, Cam Newton in 2016, and Jalen Hurts (in 2023). Super Bowl LVII was the first Super Bowl in which both teams' starting quarterbacks were Black, as Mahomes faced off against Hurts.

Four quarterbacks with Black ancestry (McNair, Newton, Mahomes, and Lamar Jackson), have won the Associated Press NFL Most Valuable Player Award.

In addition, eleven quarterbacks with known Black ancestry have won the Heisman Trophy: Andre Ware in 1989, Charlie Ward in 1993, Troy Smith in 2006, Newton in 2010, Robert Griffin III in 2011, Jameis Winston in 2013, Jackson in 2016, Kyler Murray, who is multiracial, in 2018, Bryce Young in 2021, Caleb Williams in 2022, and Jayden Daniels in 2023.

In Week 1 of the 2020 NFL season, 10 quarterbacks with known Black ancestry (Cam Newton, Teddy Bridgewater, Dwayne Haskins, Lamar Jackson, Patrick Mahomes, Kyler Murray, Dak Prescott, Tyrod Taylor, Deshaun Watson, Russell Wilson) started games for their teams, the most ever on opening week.

== Stereotyping of Black quarterbacks ==
A lot of us aren't viewed as passers – we're viewed as athletes. I think it's unfair and unfortunate.

— Michael Vick

There is some controversy over how white and Black quarterbacks tend to be described by the media, especially with NFL draft prospects. Draft experts and scouts have a history of describing Black quarterbacks in ways that perpetuate racial stereotypes and hurt those prospects' chances of making it to the NFL as a quarterback. Even those who make it to the NFL allegedly continue to face this narrative.

An empirical study published in The Howard Journal of Communications supported this hypothesis. The researchers analyzed the written descriptions of quarterback prospects in the NFL Draft section of the Sports Illustrated website from 1998 to 2007. They looked at each player's description for words or phrases about athleticism and intelligence and sorted them into categories based on whether they were positive or negative. A significant difference was found between how Black and white quarterbacks are described by SI. Black quarterbacks tend to be praised for their athleticism and criticized for a lack of intelligence. Meanwhile, white quarterbacks are often praised for their intelligence and criticized for a lack of athleticism. For example, Daunte Culpepper and Tee Martin, both Black quarterbacks, were described with terms such as "physical specimen" and "impressive specimen", respectively. Meanwhile, white players were described as "good signal callers," and "real student[s] of the game."

Sports writers have discussed how Black quarterbacks often have their intellectual and leadership qualities as a quarterback minimized. Due to "racial stacking" in sports, in which players are typecast into certain on-field positions based on racial stereotypes, Black players were rarely granted opportunities as quarterbacks, as it was considered a "thinking" position. Martenzie Johnson of The Undefeated wrote, "Black quarterback success is more likely attributed to superior athletic skill by football broadcasters, research has shown, while white quarterbacks are deemed successful more because of their intellect."

=== Wonderlic testing ===
Until 2022, players were given the Wonderlic Personnel Test, a test of mental aptitude, at the NFL Scouting Combine. As of 2018, the average score of active Super Bowl winning quarterbacks was 30.7 which is particularly salient given the fact that a score of 22 is average and the position average is about 24. This list of winning quarterbacks included Russell Wilson, who got a score of 28. Of all positions, quarterbacks and offensive linemen, particularly centers, had the highest average scores as well as the greatest percentage of white players. Tight end, the position with the next highest position average, also had a greater percentage of white players relative to the league average.

There is evidence that higher Wonderlic scores are mildly correlated with lower interception rates and higher passer ratings. However, the Wonderlic test has not been without criticism, with some claiming it is racially biased. In addition, some quarterbacks with low scores, such as Donovan McNabb, who is Black, and Jim Kelly, who is white (15 for both), have had long successful careers in the NFL. In 2013, the NFL began administering the Player Assessment Tool, an additional test of mental aptitude to go alongside the Wonderlic during the combine process. Following the 2021 season, the League decided to eliminate the Wonderlic Test from the Combine process altogether.

== Notable examples of quarterbacks affected by racial stereotyping ==
It's always going to be twice as bad just because of who I am – an African-American quarterback... Look across the league, man. We're held to a certain standard. We almost have to be perfect.

— Tyrod Taylor

=== Marlin Briscoe ===
After a successful college career as a quarterback, the Denver Broncos drafted Marlin Briscoe in the 14th round of the 1968 NFL/AFL draft, with plans to shift him to the defensive secondary. It was commonplace back then to convert Black players who had played quarterback to other positions, but Briscoe did not sign with Denver until he was promised a chance to practice at quarterback. After injuries to Denver's starter, Briscoe became the first Black quarterback to start a game in an American major professional football league in 1968. That season, Briscoe threw for 1,589 yards, broke the Broncos' single-season rookie touchdown record with 14, and finished second in Rookie of the Year voting. Regardless, it became clear that Denver would no longer play him at quarterback, so Briscoe asked for and was granted his release. He then signed with the Buffalo Bills, who put him at wide receiver. Briscoe never played quarterback again for the rest of his career, but saw success as a receiver in Buffalo and later with the Miami Dolphins.

=== James Harris ===
James "Shack" Harris became the first Black quarterback to start for the Bills and was the second overall to start for a team in NFL history. After being released by the Bills and signing with the Los Angeles Rams, Harris stepped in for injured Rams starter John Hadl in 1974, and head coach Chuck Knox made him the permanent starter, a first for any Black quarterback and second overall since the AFL–NFL merger after Joe Gilliam briefly replaced Terry Bradshaw earlier that season for the Pittsburgh Steelers. Harris went on to also become the first Black quarterback to make the Pro Bowl and start and win an NFL playoff game. However, Harris received hate mail and death threats due to his race, which eventually required security guards to protect him both on the field and at hotels. When Harris suffered injuries, Knox was reportedly pressured by Rams owner Carroll Rosenbloom to play other quarterbacks such as Pat Haden and Ron Jaworski, even after Harris became healthy again and in spite of Harris leading the NFC in passer rating during his final year in Los Angeles. Harris's demotion and later trade to the San Diego Chargers became a racial issue in Los Angeles, with journalists such as Skip Bayless and Brad Pye Jr. covering the matter. A wide perception of Harris' mistreatment as a starting quarterback by Rams management was referenced during a skit in the initial episode of The Richard Pryor Show.

=== Joe Gilliam ===
After being used sparingly in his first two seasons backing up Terry Bradshaw, in 1974 Chuck Noll declared the quarterback race "wide open" between Bradshaw, Joe Gilliam, and Terry Hanratty. Gilliam, who had the fastest release of the three, won out in training camp and opened the season as the starter, leading the Steelers to a 4-1-1 record before being benched for Bradshaw due to Gilliam struggling in some of the games. Gilliam, who had received death threats from Steeler fans (some of them racially-based), claimed that Noll benched him because he was racist. However, many teammates, including the African American John Stallworth and team leader Joe Greene (the latter of whom personally preferred Bradshaw), defended Noll, who was noted to give many African Americans opportunities both on the field and in coaching due in part having grown up in a largely black neighborhood in Cleveland and was colorblind. Stallworth added that Gilliam's demotion was more to do with deliberately defying Noll's rules and, more long-term, his substance abuse issues that Gilliam would struggle with for the rest of his life. For his part, Bradshaw felt that Gilliam was the better quarterback and that Gilliam basically gave Bradshaw his job back. Nevertheless, Gilliam claimed that his benching and eventual release from the Steelers in 1976 was racially motivated up until his death from a cocaine overdose in 2000."

=== Kordell Stewart ===
After spending his first years in the NFL as a backup quarterback and utility player, Kordell Stewart, nicknamed "Slash" due to his versatility, won the starting position for the Pittsburgh Steelers in 1997. After a productive 1997 season at quarterback, Stewart struggled after his offensive coordinator Chan Gailey left to become head coach of the Dallas Cowboys, and at one point in 1998 was ordered by head coach Bill Cowher to attend wide receiver meetings instead of quarterback meetings, though he would eventually return to the quarterback position in 1999. During this time, rumors surfaced that Stewart had been arrested after being caught doing sexual acts with another man in Schenley Park, leading to ongoing rumors of Stewart's sexuality to this day. Stewart himself acknowledged that he believed the rumors were race-based and no such police report exists on Stewart's arrest, confirming that the rumors were false.

Stewart would face criticism for the rest of his time in Pittsburgh for his play, race, and rumored homosexuality, even hearing a racial slur from a local fan, despite a bounce-back season in 2001, and as late as 2015 when encountering Steelers owner Dan Rooney at former teammate Jerome Bettis's induction into the Pro Football Hall of Fame was told by Rooney that "he would've made a better wide receiver". He opened up about his experiences with Pittsburgh in a piece published by The Players' Tribune. Following the essay's publication, numerous journalists, including Ron Cook of the Pittsburgh Post-Gazette, expressed sympathy for Stewart and also confirmed witnessing the racism and homophobia displayed toward him during his tenure with the Steelers.

=== Donovan McNabb ===
In 2003, conservative radio talk show host Rush Limbaugh claimed that the media was biased in favor of Donovan McNabb, a prominent Black quarterback at the time. Limbaugh stated that "the media has been very desirous that a Black quarterback do well… he got a lot of credit for the performance of this team that he really didn't deserve." In a study of news coverage of white and Black quarterbacks, political scientist David Niven of Florida Atlantic University disputed Limbaugh's claim, and found that Black quarterbacks, including McNabb, did not receive preferential treatment by the media, yet neither did white quarterbacks, noting there were "minor" and "inconsistent" differences.

=== Tyrod Taylor ===
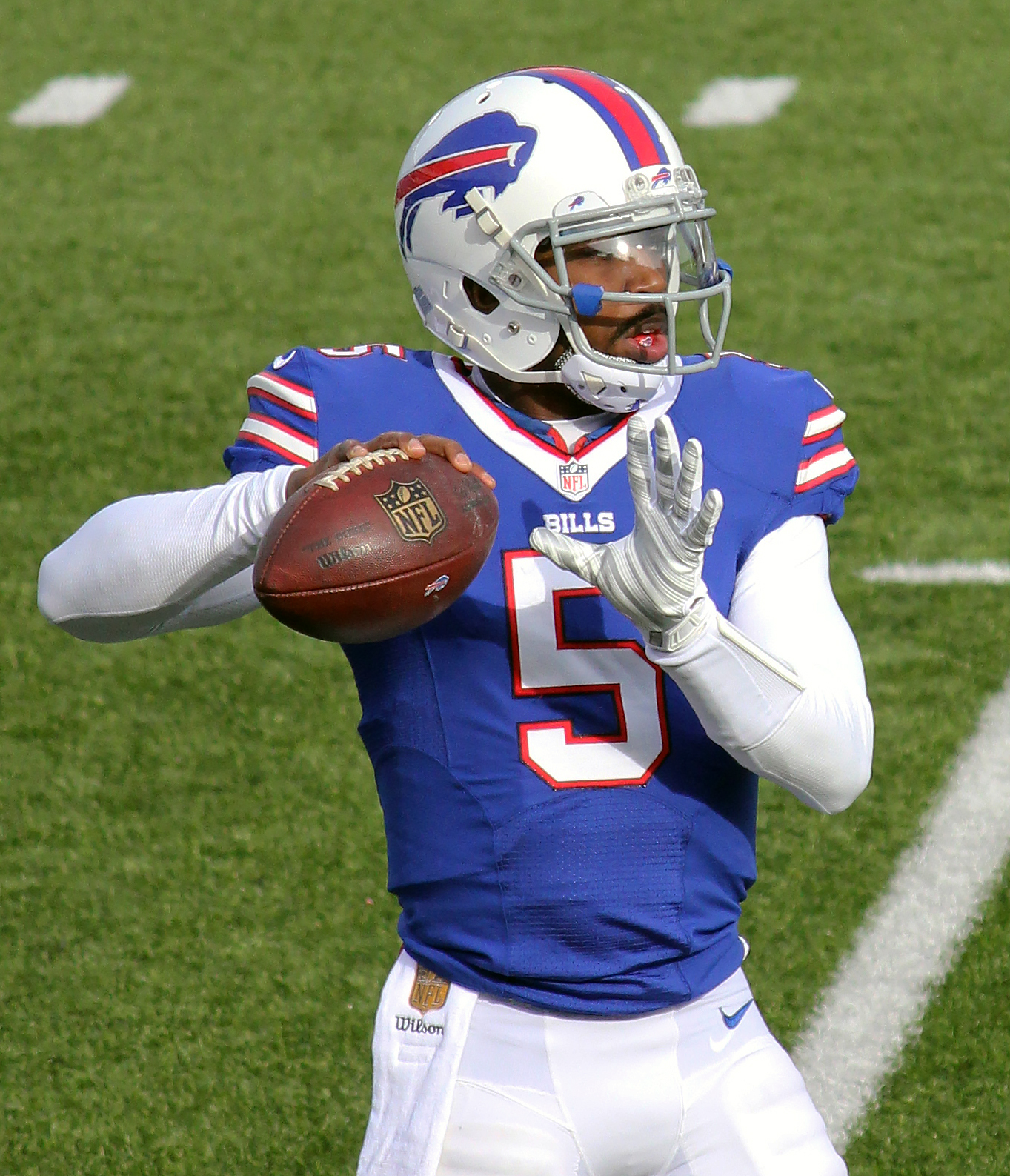
Tyrod Taylor pictured in a 2016 game

In a 2017 interview published by The Buffalo News, then-Buffalo Bills quarterback Tyrod Taylor stated that he always knew he would be criticized more than his white counterparts, a sentiment also echoed by Michael Vick and Cam Newton, but that it drives him to be a better player.

=== Deshaun Watson ===
Despite his ability to both pass and run effectively, Cleveland Browns signal-caller Deshaun Watson despises being called a dual-threat quarterback as he believes the term is often used to stigmatize Black quarterbacks. In 2018, Watson, then playing for the Houston Texans, was the subject of racist remarks echoing these stereotypes after making a bad decision in a game. The superintendent of the Onalaska school district outside of Houston, Lynn Redden, came under fire and later resigned for saying that "when you need precision decision making you can't count on a black quarterback."

=== Lamar Jackson ===
Despite a prolific college career as Louisville's quarterback, Lamar Jackson received suggestions to switch to receiver by pundits including Pro Football Hall of Fame general manager Bill Polian due to his athleticism. Jackson adamantly fought off the notion leading up to the 2018 NFL draft, even refusing to run drills such as the 40-yard dash at the NFL Scouting Combine in order to focus on displaying his passing skills. During Jackson's 2019 season as starting quarterback for the Baltimore Ravens, in which he won the MVP award, Polian recanted his previous statement, saying he was wrong for suggesting a positional switch for Jackson. At one point after throwing 5 touchdown passes in a 59-10 blowout victory over the Miami Dolphins, Jackson was quoted as saying about his own performance, "not bad for a running back."

=== Kyler Murray ===
Before the Arizona Cardinals' 2022 season, quarterback Kyler Murray engaged in a lengthy contract dispute with the Cardinals. Eventually, Murray and the Cardinals agreed to a 5-year, $230.5 million extension in July, but the new contract contained a film study clause that required Murray to study film for four hours a week. Several observers intensely criticized the Cardinals organization for the inclusion of the clause, including Hall of Fame quarterback Warren Moon, who perceived the clause as stereotypical towards Black quarterbacks. Specifically, Moon elaborated that "it's something we were always accused of back in the day when they didn't let us (Black quarterbacks) play...that we were lazy, that we didn't study, that we couldn't be leaders, that we weren't smart. So all those different things just kind of came to surface after we put all that stuff to bed over the years and just because of this deal that's going on between Arizona and Kyler." In response to the criticism, the team removed the clause a week later.

== See also ==
- Race and sports
- Black players in professional American football
- Quarterback
- NFL controversies
