= Racial stacking =

Racial stacking (also known as positional segregation, positional stacking, or simply stacking) is a sociological term and sports concept regarding how athletes may be placed, or "stacked", into a certain position based on racial or ethnic stereotypes.

Often, white players are found to over-represented in positions termed as "central" or "thinking", or those considered as based on leadership. Meanwhile, racial minorities are found to be over-represented in "peripheral" or "skill" positions that rely more on speed, size, and athletic ability.

== History and examples ==
Stacking has been written about as being an issue in college sports. Brigham Young University (BYU) sociology students and football players Keenan Ellis and Lorenzo Fauatea found in their research that even at Historically black colleges and universities (HBCUs), "white players were recruited to key positions and received more playing time than Black players."

The concept of racial stacking in American football is commonly written and researched about. In 1975, research by D. Stanley Eitzen and David C. Sanford was published discussing stacking in the sport. Their research found that the positional segregation resulted in "discriminatory consequences," as the "positions overmanned by blacks" were considered "less glamorous" and because of their dependence on speed and quickness, players in these positions were more susceptible to "age and injury". Prone to shortened careers because of these factors, Black players would earn less lifetime earnings from the sport, as well as less benefits from pension funds dependent on a player's longevity. Black players would be placed in positions not considered as "thinking" or "leadership" positions. Examples of racial stacking in the sport include Black National Football League (NFL) players not being given many opportunities to play the quarterback, middle linebacker, or center positions which were often seen as "too cerebral". Indeed, many players and coaches often noted these positions as such. Bear Bryant, for example, stated that "a smart, capable quarterback is the single greatest asset a football team can possess." Nick Buoniconti stated a linebacker must be "smart" and a "leader". In contrast, a "noncentral" position such as running back would often have traits like speed, agility, and instinct emphasized in books by coaches and players. Often, in the 1960s and 1970s, Black quarterbacks would transition to the wide receiver position when advancing a level, such as from high school to college or collegiate to professional. Writing for Scientific American in 2023, Tracie Canada wrote that "these demographic discrepancies place Black athletes at a higher risk during play."

Stacking is also present in baseball, where Hispanic players are often typecast as shortstops and second basemen. A research study by Tina Nobis and Felicia Lazaridou published in 2022 also found racial stacking present in German soccer. Based on the 2020–21 Bundesliga season, their research found that "white players are more likely to play positions associated with leadership, oversight, responsibility, intelligence, and organization, whereas Black players are more likely to play positions associated with aggressiveness, speed, and instinct."

The stacking concept is also present outside of playing positions, with the issue being considered by Ellis and Fauatea as even more intense in coaching circles. Eitzen and Sanford found that since Black players were not considered for "thinking" or "leadership" positions, their time at a "non-leadership position is, therefore, assumed to be inadequate training for a career in coaching," considering this at least one factor for lower representation of Black individuals in coaching positions.

== See also ==
- Racial issues faced by black quarterbacks
- Stereotypes of African Americans
