= Tyrod Taylor =

American football player (born 1989)

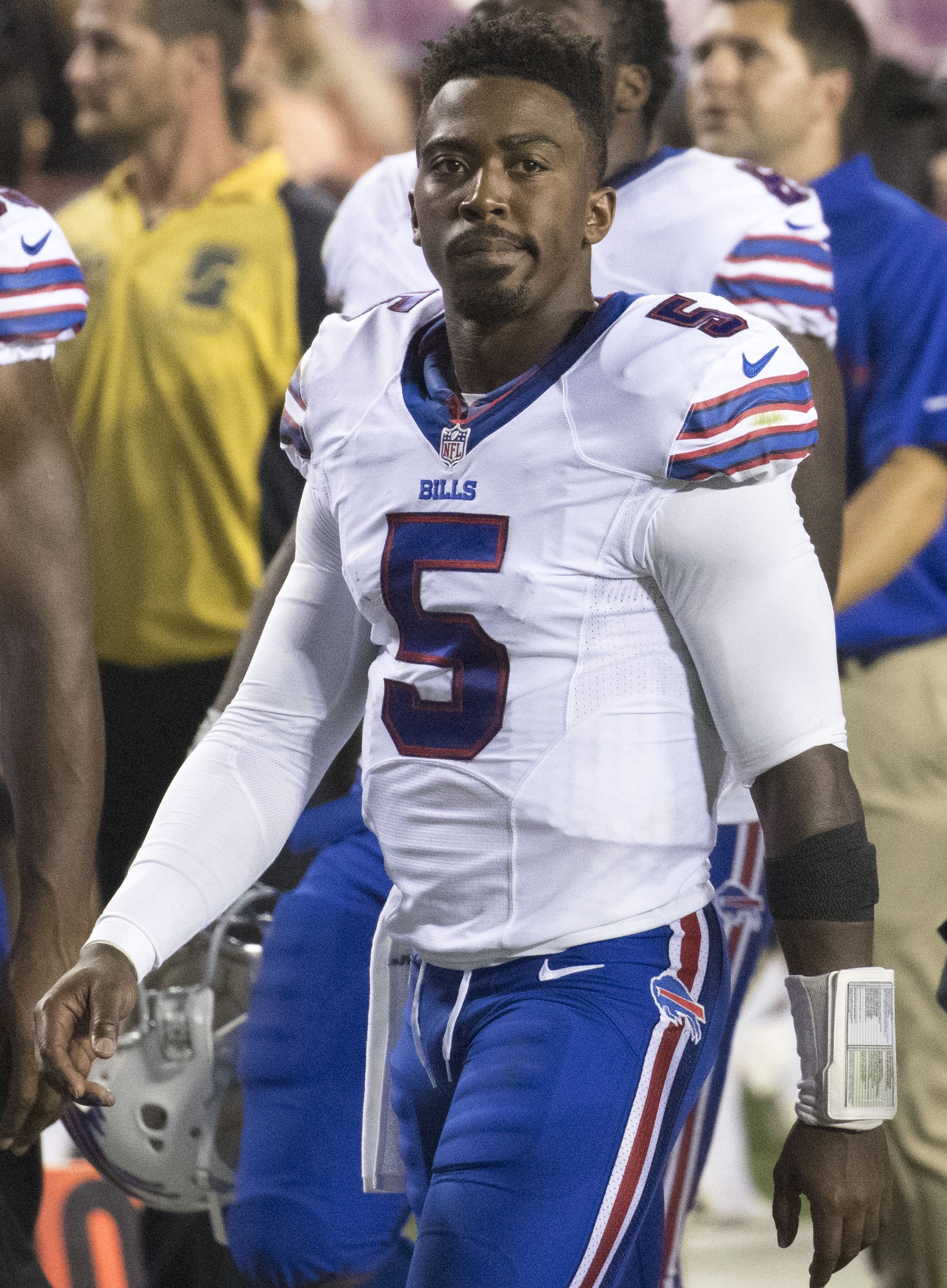
- Taylor with the Buffalo Bills in 2016

No. 6 – Green Bay Packers
- Position: Quarterback
- Roster status: Active

Personal information
- Born: August 3, 1989 (age 37); Hampton, Virginia, U.S.
- Listed height: 6 ft 1 in (1.85 m)
- Listed weight: 217 lb (98 kg)

Career information
- High school: Hampton
- College: Virginia Tech (2007–2010)
- NFL draft: 2011: 6th round, 180th overall pick

Career history
- Baltimore Ravens (2011–2014); Buffalo Bills (2015–2017); Cleveland Browns (2018); Los Angeles Chargers (2019–2020); Houston Texans (2021); New York Giants (2022–2023); New York Jets (2024–2025); Green Bay Packers (2026–present)

Awards and highlights
- Super Bowl champion (XLVII); Pro Bowl (2015); ACC Player of the Year (2010); ACC Offensive Player of the Year (2010); First-team All-ACC (2010)

Career NFL statistics as of Week 10, 2026
- Passing attempts: 1,888
- Passing completions: 1,166
- Completion percentage: 61.8%
- TD–INT: 73–34
- Passing yards: 13,036
- Passer rating: 87.7
- Rushing yards: 2,422
- Rushing touchdowns: 20
- Stats at Pro Football Reference

Tyrod Di'allo Taylor (born August 3, 1989) is an American professional football quarterback for the Green Bay Packers of the National Football League (NFL). He played college football for the Virginia Tech Hokies and was selected by the Baltimore Ravens in the sixth round of the 2011 NFL draft.

While in Baltimore, Taylor served as the backup to starting quarterback Joe Flacco, including during the Ravens' Super Bowl XLVII victory over the San Francisco 49ers. The Buffalo Bills signed him as a free agent in 2015, taking over the starting quarterback duties that season and earning a Pro Bowl appearance. In 2017, he helped the Bills make the playoffs for the first time in 18 years. Taylor was traded to the Cleveland Browns in March 2018, with the Bills drafting Josh Allen to replace him. Taylor subsequently earned the starting position for the Browns, Los Angeles Chargers, Houston Texans, New York Giants, and New York Jets, but was sidelined due to injuries all five times and replaced by rookies Baker Mayfield, Justin Herbert, Davis Mills, Tommy DeVito, and Brady Cook, respectively.

== Early life ==
At Hampton High School, in Hampton, Virginia, Taylor was a three-sport athlete in football, basketball, and track. In football, he helped lead the team as a quarterback, while also becoming the team's kick returner and safety. During his four years as starter, Taylor led the team to a 34–4 record and the 2005 VHSL state championship. He accumulated 7,690 yards of offense and scored 100 total touchdowns. Taylor passed for 5,144 yards and 44 touchdowns, while rushing for 2,546 yards and 56 touchdowns.

When Taylor graduated from Hampton in 2007, he was rated as the No. 1 dual-threat quarterback at Rivals.com. ESPN.com rated Taylor the No. 3 overall quarterback, while Scout.com said he was the nation's seventh-best passer. Taylor ran a 4.55-second 40-yard dash. He narrowed his final two choices down to Virginia Tech and the University of Florida, and chose to attend the former.

== College career ==
=== Freshman year ===
As a freshman, Taylor shared time for most of the season with the junior quarterback Sean Glennon.

Taylor's first action of college football came in the game against the LSU Tigers on September 8, 2007. In that game, he completed seven of 18 passes for 62 yards and rushed nine times for 44 yards and his first collegiate touchdown. After the game, Taylor was named the starter by head coach Frank Beamer. In his first collegiate start against Ohio, Taylor threw for 287 yards and rushed for a touchdown.

One of Taylor's early accolades was rushing for 92 yards and a touchdown as well as passing for 204 yards and two touchdowns in leading Virginia Tech to its first victory against Florida State in two decades. The win was the first ever for Frank Beamer against Florida State head coach Bobby Bowden.

On October 13, in the second quarter of a game against Duke, Taylor suffered a high ankle sprain which forced him to miss two games. Taylor returned in a game at Georgia Tech, but did not start for the rest of the season and rotated time with starter Sean Glennon.

Throughout the season, Taylor accumulated 1,356 total yards, including 927 passing and 429 rushing. He completed 72-of-134 passing attempts, for a completion percentage of 53.7. Taylor scored 11 touchdowns during the year, five passing and six rushing.

=== Sophomore year ===
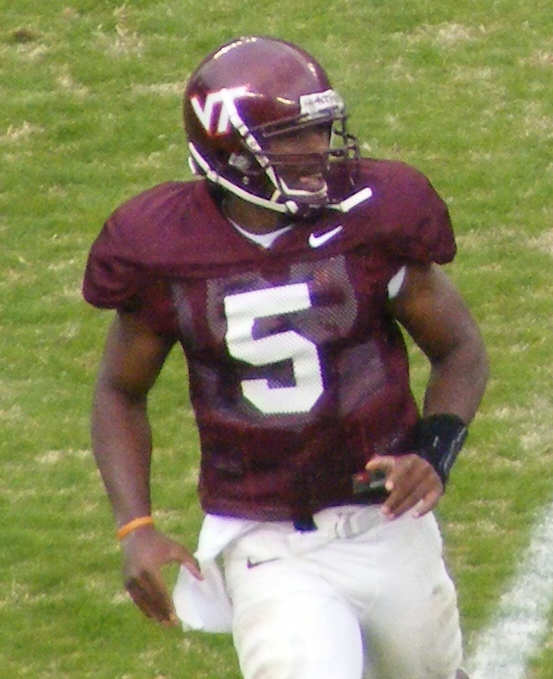
Taylor in 2008

Coming into the 2008 season, Taylor was intended to be redshirted. After Virginia Tech's loss to East Carolina University though, his redshirt was taken off due to Tech's need for more offense. Taylor's first appearance of the season came in the second game of the season against Furman, where he rushed for 112 yards and a touchdown. His first sophomore start came in the following week against Georgia Tech.

After starting every game of the 2008 season leading up to the Florida State game on October 25, Taylor suffered a high ankle sprain on the first play of the Florida State game. Sean Glennon relieved Taylor at the quarterback position after this setback. While Glennon got the start versus Miami, Taylor split time with Glennon and led a crucial fourth quarter to make it a two-point game 16–14. However, he was sacked in a crucial 4th and 3 with less than two minutes left. After the loss, Taylor started against Duke. After committing five turnovers in the first half, he was pulled from the game and replaced by Sean Glennon. Taylor then started next week at Virginia. He performed well including a 73-yard run and finished the game going 12-for-18 for 137 yards and a touchdown while also rushing 16 times for 137 yards. Taylor then started in the ACC Championship Game win over Boston College and was named the ACC Championship Game MVP. On January 1, 2009, he led the Hokies to a 20–7 victory over the Cincinnati Bearcats in the 2009 Orange Bowl. Overall, Taylor finished his sophomore season with 1,036 passing yards with two touchdowns and seven interceptions.

=== Junior year ===
During his junior season, Taylor led the Hokies to a 9–3 regular season record and a second-place finish in the Coastal Division of the ACC. The Hokies played the Tennessee Volunteers in the 2009 Chick-fil-A Bowl and won 37–14, finishing with a final record of 10–3. After climbing as high as #4 in the rankings, Tech lost back to back games against Georgia Tech and North Carolina, but finished the season ranked 10th in both the AP and USA Today Top 25 polls. In the 2009 season, Taylor finished with 2,311 passing yards, 13 touchdowns, and five interceptions. After his junior season, Taylor had a 23–5 career record at Virginia Tech, which was the second most wins of all time for a starting quarterback at Virginia Tech.

=== Senior year ===
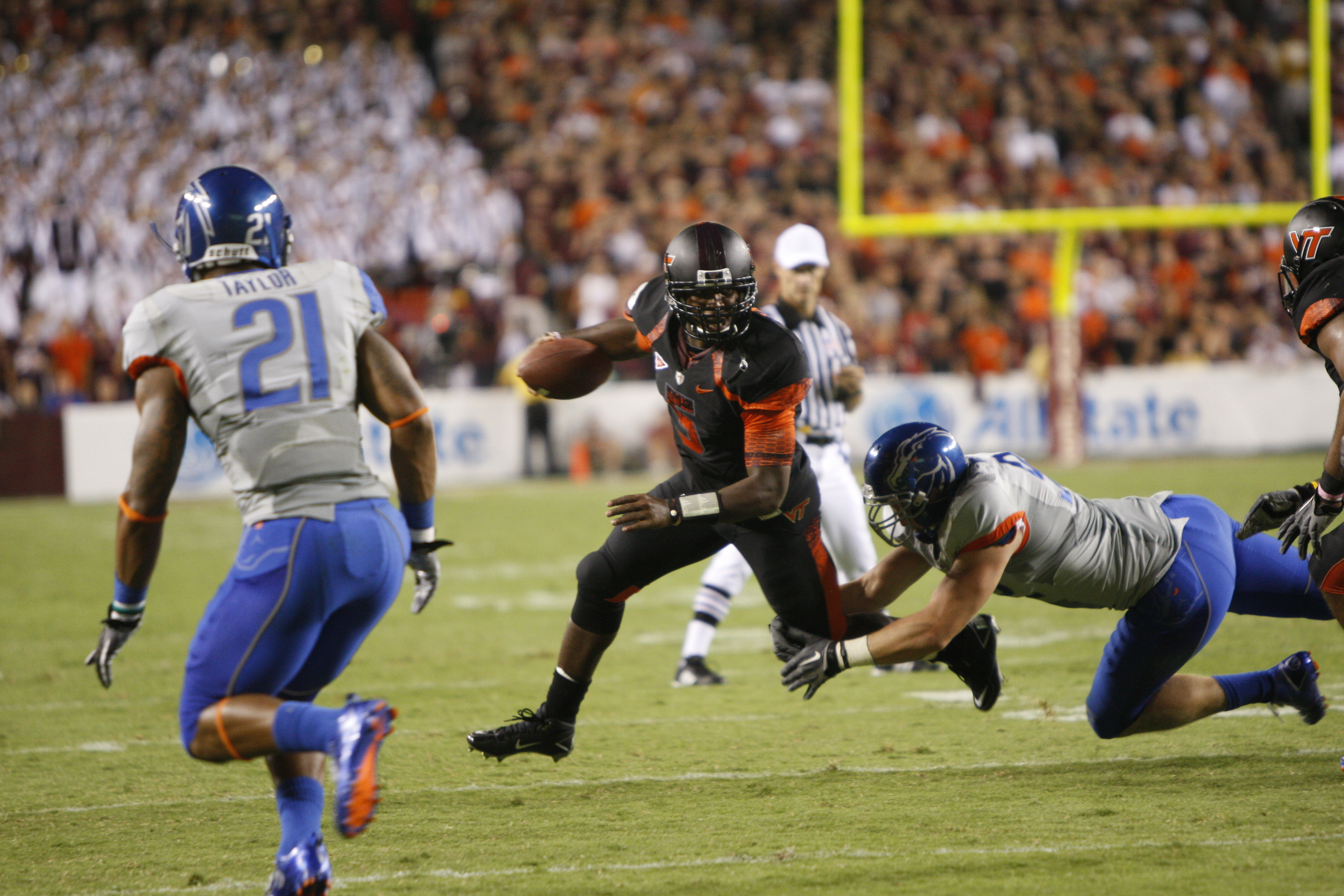
Taylor scrambling against Boise State

Taylor's senior season began with two heartbreaking losses to Boise State at FedExField and at home to Division I-FCS James Madison. He was 15-of-22 for 186 yards and two touchdowns, along with 73 yards on the ground, against Boise State, but was unable to respond following a Broncos score with 1:03 remaining. However, Taylor ultimately led the Hokies to a remarkable turnaround season, winning 11 consecutive games after the 0–2 start. The 2010 Hokies became the first ACC team to finish with an undefeated 8–0 record in ACC play in 10 years. They became ACC Champions for the fourth time in seven seasons with a 44–33 win over Florida State in the 2010 ACC Championship Game in Charlotte. Overall, in his final collegiate season, Taylor had 2,743 passing yards, 24 touchdowns, and five interceptions. He finished the regular season as ACC Player of the Year and ACC Championship Game Most Valuable Player.

Taylor participated in the 2011 East-West Shrine Game. He completed four of his five passes for 59 yards.

== Professional career ==
Pre-draft measurables
Height	Weight	Arm length	Hand span	Wingspan	40-yard dash	10-yard split	20-yard split	20-yard shuttle	Three-cone drill	Vertical jump	Broad jump	Wonderlic
6 ft 0 3/4 in (1.85 m)	217 lb (98 kg)	32 1/4 in (0.82 m)	10 in (0.25 m)	6 ft 4 1/8 in (1.93 m)	4.51 s	1.56 s	2.61 s	4.09 s	6.78 s	37.5 in (0.95 m)	10 ft 6 in (3.20 m)	15
All values from NFL Combine

=== Baltimore Ravens ===
==== 2011 season ====
Taylor was selected in the sixth round (180th overall) by the Baltimore Ravens in the 2011 NFL draft. He was the 11th quarterback to be selected that year. The Ravens previously acquired the pick from the St. Louis Rams in a trade that sent Mark Clayton to St. Louis. The Ravens played Taylor at quarterback, in spite of the fact that many in the league believed he would be better suited at wide receiver instead.

In his first preseason start against the Atlanta Falcons, Taylor left with a shoulder injury. Early tests revealed no separation and his injury was characterized as a contusion.

Taylor played in his first regular season game on December 4, 2011 in the form of a single play. In the second quarter of a victory over the Cleveland Browns, he rushed for a two-yard gain which set up a 6-yard touchdown run by running back Ray Rice. In the next game against the Indianapolis Colts, Taylor also lined up as a wide receiver for one play. The following week against the San Diego Chargers, he threw his first career regular season pass, an 18-yard completion to wide receiver Anquan Boldin, for the final play of the game.

==== 2012 season ====
During the regular season finale, Joe Flacco was rested for most of the game against the Cincinnati Bengals, offering Taylor significant playing time. Taylor scored his first career touchdown on a one-yard bootleg in the fourth quarter, but proceeded to throw a crucial interception to defensive end Carlos Dunlap, which Dunlap returned for a touchdown in a 23–17 loss.

Taylor went on to earn a championship ring when the Ravens won Super Bowl XLVII over the San Francisco 49ers.

==== 2013 season ====
In the preseason, Taylor completed 21-of-36 passes for 263 yards and four touchdowns with two interceptions. He also showed his versatility as a runner, using designed runs and scrambles for 66 yards on 15 carries. Taylor's strong preseason performance allowed him to keep his job as the Ravens' backup quarterback for the third consecutive season.

During Week 10, Taylor saw his first play of the season in a victory over the Bengals. He ran an end-around handoff from Flacco for 18 yards, which was the longest run by any Ravens player in that game. Two weeks later against the New York Jets, Taylor played 12 total snaps, five at quarterback, where he gained seven yards on four carries, as well as a 17-yard first down run in the first quarter. Taylor's total yardage was brought down by two second half runs where he lost 13 yards. He also made one reception for six yards.

In Week 16, Taylor entered the game for Flacco during a blowout loss to the New England Patriots. On his first snap, center Gino Gradkowski snapped the ball too far to the right, which was recovered by New England for a touchdown. He finished the 41–7 loss, completing 1-of-4 passes for two yards and an interception that the Patriots' defense returned for a touchdown.

==== 2014 season ====
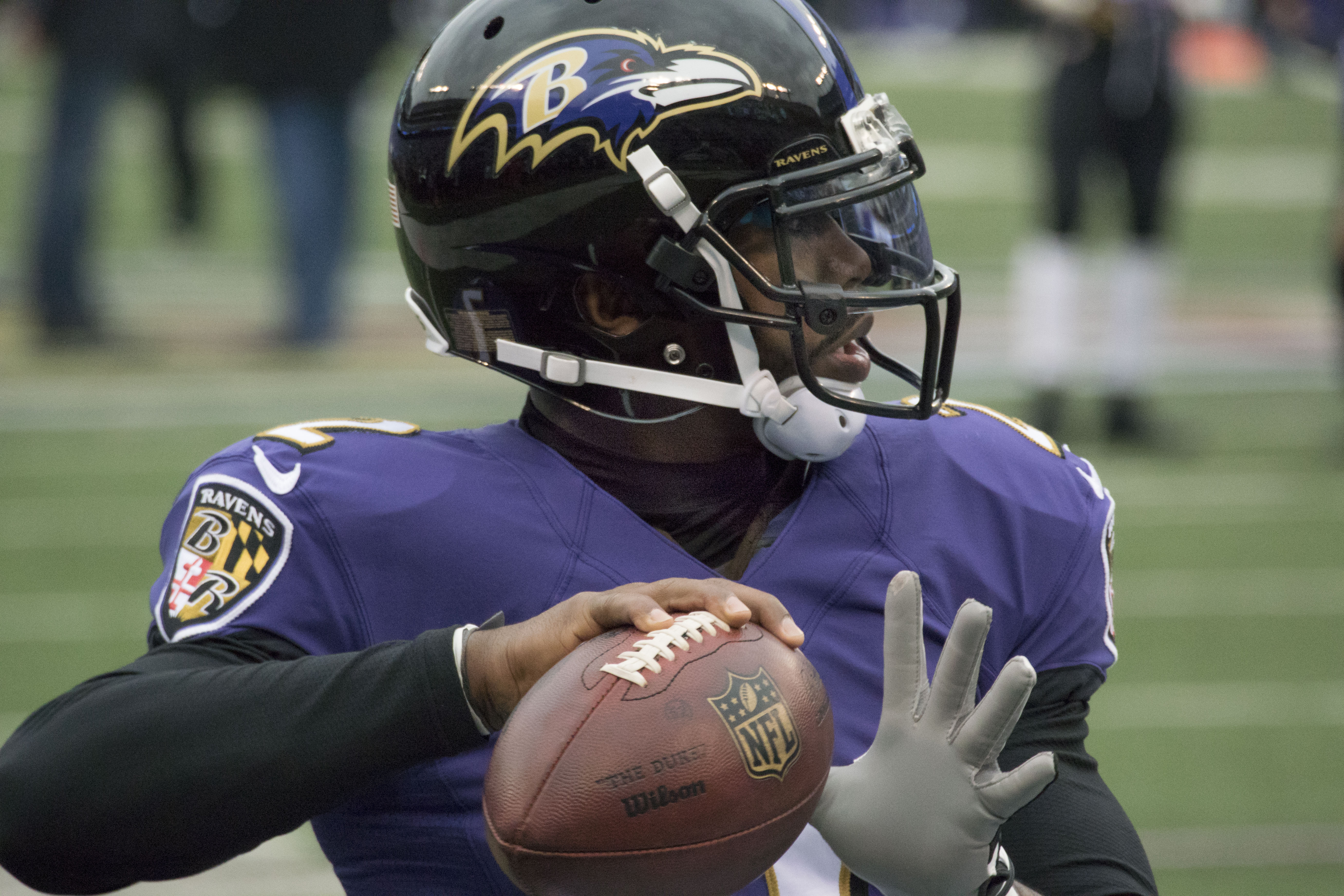
Taylor in 2014

In Week 6, Taylor saw his only action of the season in a 48–17 blowout victory over the Tampa Bay Buccaneers, coming in during the fourth quarter to relieve Flacco.

=== Buffalo Bills ===
==== 2015 season ====
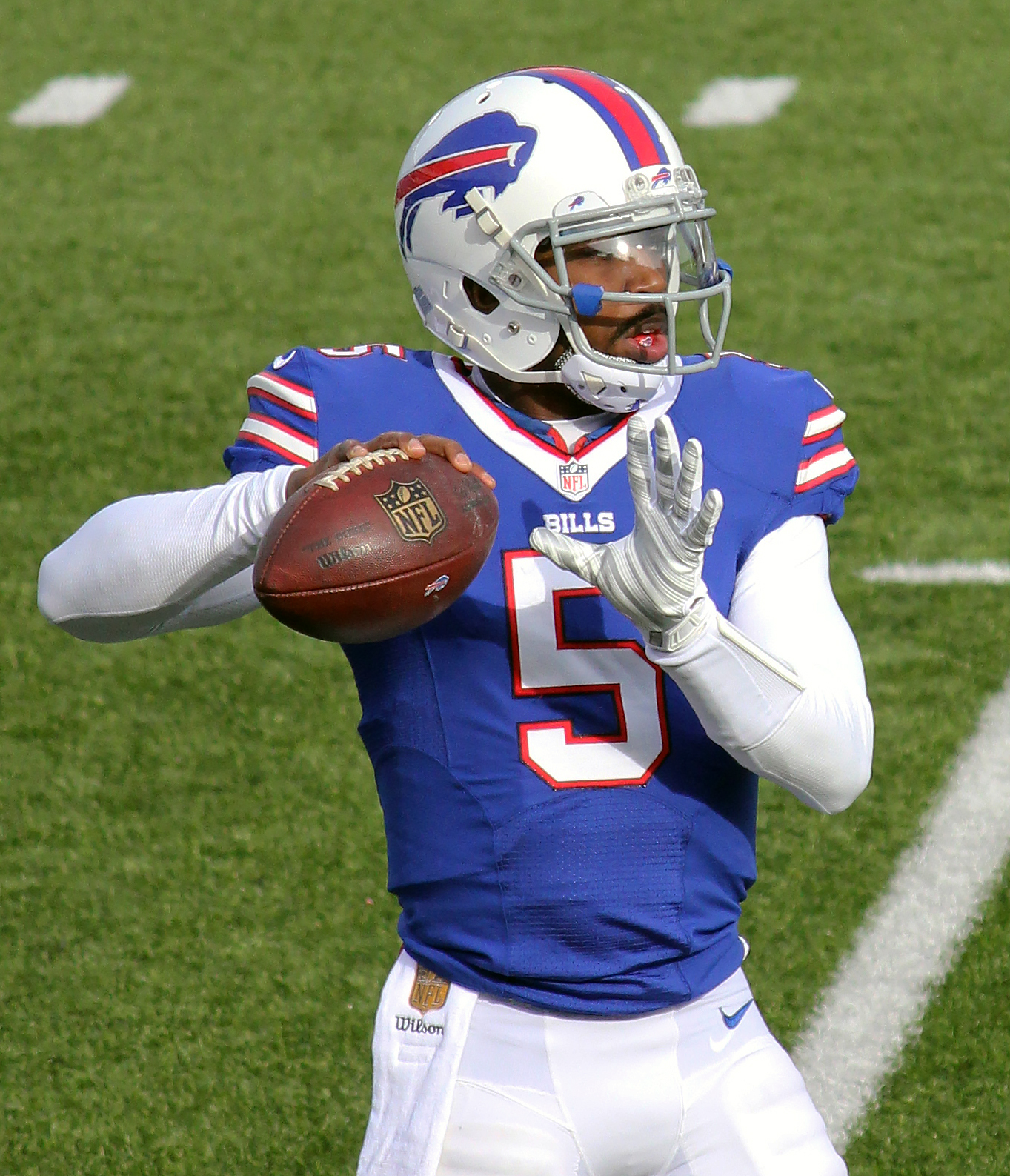
Taylor in 2015

On March 12, 2015, Taylor signed a three-year, $3.35 million contract with the Buffalo Bills.

On August 31, Taylor was named starting quarterback by new head coach Rex Ryan, beating out former Bills' first round pick EJ Manuel and veteran Matt Cassel in a preseason quarterback competition among the three.

In Week 1, Taylor completed 14-of-19 passes for 195 yards and a touchdown, while also rushing for 41 yards, as the Bills beat the Colts by a score of 27–14. (Note: Cassel was credited as the Bills' starting quarterback for Week 1 due to him taking the team's first snap on offense in the wildcat formation with Taylor lined up at wide receiver.) In the next game against the Patriots, Taylor completed 23-of-30 pass attempts, throwing three touchdowns as well as three interceptions during a 40–32 loss. Taylor also added 43 running yards and a rushing touchdown.

In Week 3, Taylor had the best game of his career (to date) in a 41–14 win over the Miami Dolphins. He completed 21-of-29 pass attempts with three touchdowns and no interceptions, while adding 12 rushing yards.

In Week 5, in a come-from-behind victory over the Tennessee Titans, Taylor became the fifth quarterback in NFL history to throw for at least 100 yards, run for at least 70 yards and catch a pass in a single game. His jersey from the game was sent to the Pro Football Hall of Fame in Canton, Ohio.

After the game, it was reported that Taylor had suffered an MCL injury, with the expectation that he would miss the Bills' Week 6 game against the undefeated Cincinnati Bengals. In his absence, EJ Manuel was named starter and the Bills dropped the next two games.

In Week 9, Taylor returned to lead the Bills to a 33–17 victory over the Dolphins. Taylor went 11-for-12 passes with 181 yards and a touchdown, to go along with a career-high 146.5 passer rating. In the win, Taylor also set the franchise record for completion percentage (91.7%) in a single game.

In Week 13, Taylor set the Bills' franchise record for consecutive passes without an interception in the third quarter of a win against the Houston Texans. The previous record had been held by Drew Bledsoe since 2002.

In Week 14, the no-interception streak ended on the last pass of the game, in a 23–20 loss to the Philadelphia Eagles (222).

In Week 15, the Bills were eliminated from the playoffs in a 35–25 loss to the Washington Redskins. Taylor set the Bills' franchise record for most rushing yards in a season by a quarterback, and became the first Bills' quarterback with over 500 yards rushing in a season. The Bills finished 8–8 on the year, only the third time they finished .500 or above in consecutive years since the late 1990s.

Taylor finished the 2015 season completing 63.7% of his passes, while throwing for over 3,000 yards, with 20 touchdowns to 6 interceptions. He added 568 rushing yards on the ground.

On January 25, 2016, Taylor and teammate offensive lineman Eric Wood were selected to the Pro Bowl and went on to play for Team Rice. They replaced Panthers' quarterback Cam Newton and Panthers' center Ryan Kalil, who were playing in Super Bowl 50. Taylor completed 8-of-14 passes for 120 yards and a touchdown, but also threw three interceptions.

==== 2016 season ====
Taylor entered training camp as the starting quarterback in the final year of his contract, as the third year of his deal was voided when he played more than 50% of the snaps in the 2015 season. On August 12, 2016, Taylor signed a six-year extension worth $92 million. However, the contract contained an option after the first year.

On Christmas Eve against the Dolphins, Taylor threw for a career-high 329 yards and three touchdowns in the 34–31 overtime loss.

For the season, Taylor completed 269-of-436 passes for 3,023 yards and 17 touchdowns with six interceptions. In addition, he rushed for 580 yards and six touchdowns. He was made inactive for the final game of the season due to a clause in his contract that would make his 2017 salary guaranteed if he suffered a serious injury. At the time of the game, he already had a groin injury that could require surgery. On January 5, 2017, Taylor had surgery to repair a core muscle issue. Taylor was selected as a 2017 Pro Bowl alternate, but he declined the invitation due to injury.

==== 2017 season ====
After the firing of Rex Ryan, it was widely speculated that the Bills would either trade Taylor or decline his option. Nonetheless, the Bills and Taylor agreed to restructure his contract, keeping him with the team until the end of 2018.

Taylor sustained a concussion early in the third preseason game against the Ravens, but was able to recover and start the Week 1 game against the Jets.

In Week 7 against the Buccaneers, Taylor helped lead the Bills to a fourth-quarter comeback, driving the offense 75 yards downfield for the game-tying touchdown with less than three minutes remaining. The Buccaneers fumbled on their next possession, setting up the Bills' game-winning field goal by Stephen Hauschka. Taylor finished the game with 268 passing yards and a touchdown, while also rushing for 53 yards.

In Week 9 against the Jets, he had a career-high 29 completions on 40 attempts for 285 yards and two passing touchdowns, to go along with 35 rushing yards and a rushing touchdown, in a 31–24 loss.

On November 15, following a Week 10 blowout loss of 47–10 to the New Orleans Saints in which Taylor only threw for 56 yards, the Bills announced that Taylor would be benched for Week 11 in favor of rookie Nathan Peterman. However, Peterman threw five interceptions during his first start against the Los Angeles Chargers and was replaced by Taylor at halftime. In Week 12 against the Kansas City Chiefs, Taylor returned as the Bills' starter and led the team to a win of 16–10 .

In Week 13 against the Patriots, Taylor was limited to only 65 passing yards after aggravating a knee injury initially suffered in the first quarter. He was relieved by Peterman for the remainder of the game as the Bills lost 23–3. Due to the knee injury, Taylor was inactive for Week 14, but returned as the starter in Week 15.

The Bills finished the season with a 9–7 record, clinching their first playoff berth since 1999.

In the Wild Card Round against the Jacksonville Jaguars, Taylor had 134 passing yards and an interception before leaving the 10–3 loss with a concussion.

=== Cleveland Browns ===
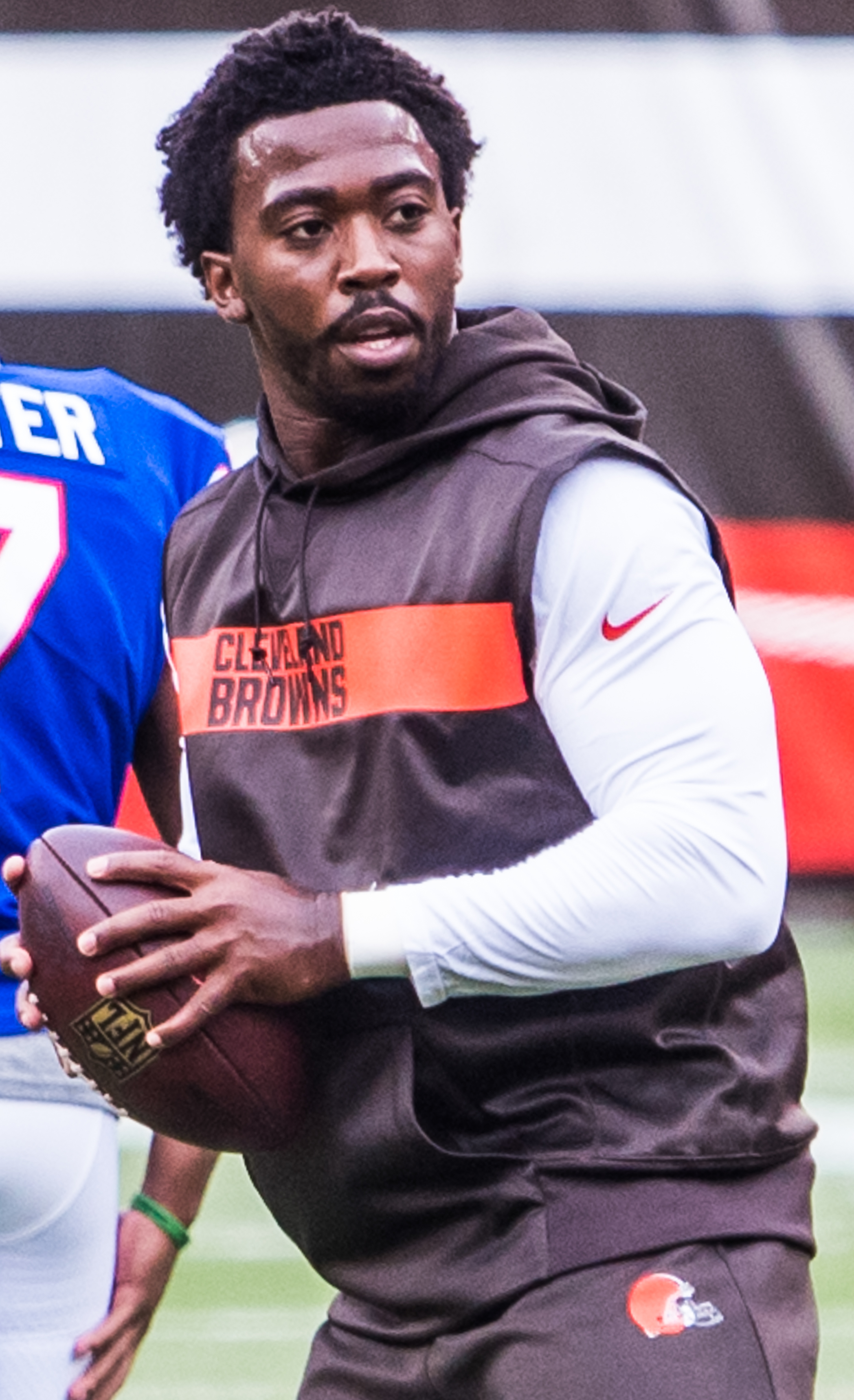
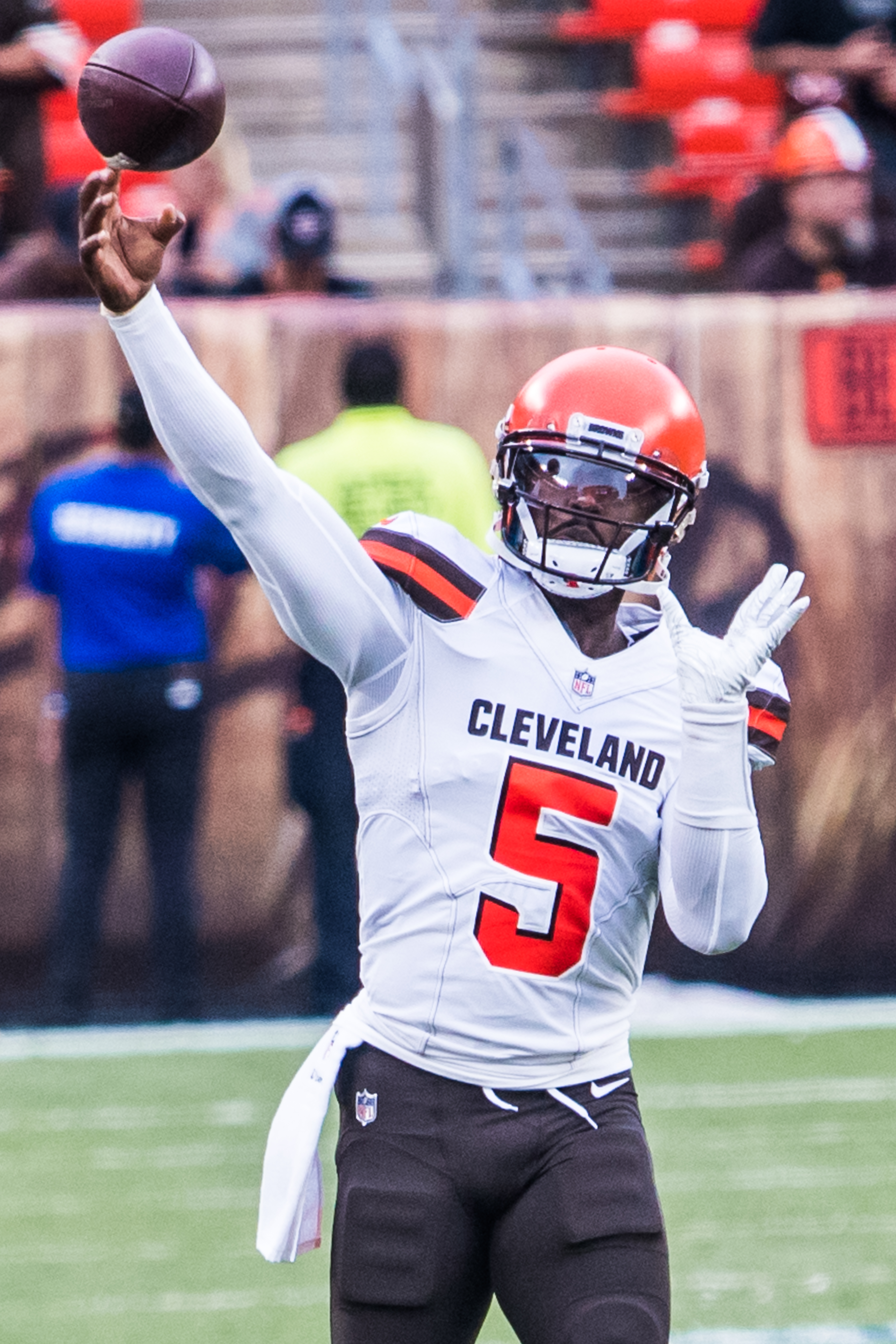
Taylor in 2018

On March 9, 2018, the Bills agreed to trade Taylor to the Cleveland Browns for a 2018 third-round draft pick. The deal became official on March 14, at the start of the NFL season.

Despite drafting quarterback Baker Mayfield first overall in the 2018 NFL draft, the Browns committed to Taylor as their season starter.

In Week 1 against the Pittsburgh Steelers, Taylor helped the Browns snap a 17-game losing streak (dating back to 2016), despite the game ending in a 21–21 tie. Taylor completed 15-of-40 pass attempts for 197 yards, a touchdown, and an interception while also rushing for 77 yards and a touchdown.

In Week 3, Taylor was injured against the Jets, which prompted Mayfield to take over at quarterback and lead the Browns to their first game win since 2016.

While Mayfield played out the rest of the season as starter, Taylor only appeared in one other game in the season, completing an 11-yard pass against the Kansas City Chiefs in Week 9.

=== Los Angeles Chargers ===
==== 2019 season ====
On March 13, 2019, Taylor signed a two-year, $11 million contract with the Chargers, reuniting with former Bills' offensive coordinator and one-time interim head coach Anthony Lynn. In Week 14, in the 45–10 victory over the Jaguars, Taylor came into the game in relief of Philip Rivers and threw a 14-yard touchdown pass to tight end Virgil Green.

==== 2020 season ====
Following a shortened training camp, and with Rivers having signed with the Colts in free agency, head coach Lynn named Taylor the Chargers' starter over rookie first-round pick Justin Herbert.

In Week 1 against the Bengals, Taylor completed 16-of-30 passes for 208 yards, in a 16–13 win. In the next game, Taylor suffered a rib injury during pre-game warmups against the Chiefs and was hospitalized, leaving Herbert to start at the last minute. Days later, it was revealed the Chargers' team doctor accidentally punctured Taylor's lung while administering a painkiller injection prior to the game. In September 2022, Taylor sued the team doctor for malpractice.

On October 8, Lynn announced that Herbert would be the starter for the remainder of the season.

In Week 9, Taylor saw brief action against the Las Vegas Raiders. Following a touchdown, Taylor came in on a two-point conversion attempt after Herbert was briefly sidelined after taking a hit. The two-point conversion attempt failed and Herbert returned the following series. The Chargers lost 31–26.

=== Houston Texans ===
On March 22, 2021, Taylor signed a one-year, $5.5 million contract with the Houston Texans. He was reunited with Texans' new head coach David Culley, who previously coached Taylor as the quarterbacks coach with the Bills in 2017.

In Week 1, Taylor started against the Jacksonville Jaguars due to legal issues with Deshaun Watson. Taylor finished 21-of-33 for 291 yards and two touchdowns along with 41 rushing yards in a 37–21 upset win. In the next game against the Browns, Taylor suffered a hamstring injury in the first half and was replaced by rookie quarterback Davis Mills for the rest of the game. He was placed on injured reserve on September 21, with Mills being named as starter, and reactivated on November 6.

In Week 13 against the Colts, Taylor was benched in the third quarter in favor of Mills. Taylor finished the game 5-of-13 for 45 yards with an interception. Houston lost 31–0 for the team's second shutout loss of the season (the first being in Week 4 against the Bills, 40–0).

On December 10, Culley announced that Mills would be the starter for the remainder of the season.

=== New York Giants ===
==== 2022 season ====
On March 17, 2022, Taylor signed a two-year contract worth $11 million with the New York Giants. In Week 4, he made his Giants debut in the third quarter against the Chicago Bears, replacing starter Daniel Jones who sustained a sprained ankle. However, ten minutes later, Taylor was concussed in the fourth quarter and Jones was put back in. The former was put in NFL concussion protocol for the fourth time in five years.

==== 2023 season ====
In Week 5, Taylor relieved Jones against the Dolphins after Jones suffered a neck injury late in the game. Taylor finished the game, completing 9-of-12 passes for 86 yards, and added another 14 yards rushing. In Week 6, with Jones out, Taylor started against his former team, the Bills. He led New York to a narrow 14–9 loss, which was decided on the last play. He became just the second black starting quarterback in Giants' history, after Geno Smith in 2017. In Week 7, Taylor started against division rival Washington Commanders, winning 14–7, and made history as the first black quarterback to ever win a game for the Giants since their entry into the NFL in 1925.

In Week 8, Taylor suffered a rib injury against the Jets, and was placed on injured reserve on November 4, replaced by Tommy DeVito on the roster. Following their bye week (Week 13), he was reactivated on December 11 to serve as backup for the rookie DeVito. He relieved DeVito at halftime of the Giants' Week 16 Christmas Day game against the Eagles, completing 7-of-16 passes for 133 yards, an interception, and a 69-yard touchdown pass to Darius Slayton in the fourth quarter. Taylor was later renamed the starter on December 27 for the last two games of the season. He appeared in 11 games and started five in the 2023 season, throwing for 1,341 yards, five touchdowns, and three interceptions.

=== New York Jets ===
==== 2024 season ====
On March 14, 2024, Taylor signed a two-year, $12 million deal with the New York Jets, serving as backup to starting quarterback Aaron Rodgers. In Week 1 against the San Francisco 49ers, Taylor came in during garbage time and threw a touchdown pass in his lone drive. In Week 17, facing a 40-point deficit against the Buffalo Bills, Taylor replaced Rodgers with 12:37 remaining in the fourth quarter. He completed 11-of-14 pass attempts for 83 yards and two touchdowns, which prevented a Jets shutout.

==== 2025 season ====
Taylor remained with the Jets for the 2025 season, despite requiring arthroscopic knee surgery during the preseason, and would serve as backup to newly-signed quarterback Justin Fields. Taylor made his first appearance of the 2025 season in a Week 2 game against the Buffalo Bills, when Fields suffered a concussion with 12:03 remaining in the fourth quarter. Taylor was able to complete 7 of his 11 pass attempts for 56 yards and the only Jets touchdown of the day. Prior to the team's Week 8 matchup against the Cincinnati Bengals, Aaron Glenn ruled Taylor out due to a knee injury and named Fields as the starter for the game. Taylor was again named as New York's starter entering their Week 12 matchup against the Baltimore Ravens.

=== Green Bay Packers ===
On May 4, 2026, Taylor signed a one-year, $2.5 million contract with the Green Bay Packers to back-up Jordan Love.

== Career statistics ==
=== NFL ===
Legend
	Won the Super Bowl
	Led the league
**Bold**	Career high

==== Regular season ====
Year	Team	Games			Passing									Rushing					Sacks		Fumbles	
Year	Team	GP	GS	Record	Cmp	Att	Pct	Yds	Y/A	Lng	TD	Int	Rtg	Att	Yds	Avg	Lng	TD	Sck	SckY	Fum	Lost
2011	BAL	3	0	—	1	1	**100.0**	18	**18.0**	18	0	0	118.7	1	2	2.0	2	0	2	3	0	0
2012	BAL	7	0	—	17	29	58.6	179	6.2	25	0	1	62.3	14	73	5.2	28	1	3	30	0	0
2013	BAL	3	0	—	1	5	20.0	2	0.4	2	0	1	0.0	8	64	8.0	25	0	0	0	0	0
2014	BAL	1	0	—	0	0	0.0	0	0.0	0	0	0	0.0	4	−3	−0.8	0	0	0	0	0	0
2015	BUF	14	13	7–6	242	380	63.7	**3,035**	8.0	63	**20**	**6**	99.4	**104**	568	5.5	31	4	36	212	**9**	1
2016	BUF	15	15	7–8	**269**	**436**	61.7	3,023	6.9	**84**	17	**6**	89.7	95	**580**	6.1	**49**	**6**	42	192	4	**2**
2017	BUF	15	14	8–6	263	420	62.6	2,799	6.7	47	14	4	89.2	84	427	5.1	32	4	**46**	**256**	4	**2**
2018	CLE	4	3	1–1–1	42	85	49.4	473	5.6	47	2	2	63.7	16	125	7.8	24	1	13	81	3	0
2019	LAC	8	0	—	4	6	66.7	33	5.5	14	1	0	120.1	10	7	0.7	9	0	0	0	0	0
2020	LAC	2	1	1–0	16	30	53.3	208	6.9	37	0	0	75.4	6	7	1.2	4	0	2	1	0	0
2021	HOU	6	6	2–4	91	150	60.7	966	6.4	52	5	5	76.7	19	151	7.9	30	3	13	119	3	0
2022	NYG	3	0	—	6	8	75.0	58	7.2	19	1	1	94.8	5	70	**14.0**	32	0	3	18	2	1
2023	NYG	11	5	2–3	116	180	64.4	1,341	7.5	80	5	3	89.1	38	197	5.2	31	0	17	94	4	0
2024	NYJ	2	0	—	17	22	77.3	119	5.4	20	3	0	**128.6**	3	13	4.3	7	0	0	0	1	0
2025	NYJ	6	4	1–3	80	134	59.7	779	5.8	52	5	5	72.9	27	143	5.3	15	1	14	82	1	1
2026	GB	3	0	0–0	1	2	50.0	3	1.5	3	0	0	56.2	2	-2	-1.0	-1	0	0	0	0	0
Career		103	61	29–31–1	1,166	1,888	61.8	13,036	6.9	84	73	34	87.7	436	2,422	5.6	49	20	191	1,088	31	7

==== Postseason ====
Year	Team	Games			Passing									Rushing					Sacks		Fumbles	
Year	Team	GP	GS	Record	Cmp	Att	Pct	Yds	Avg	Lng	TD	Int	Rtg	Att	Yds	Avg	Lng	TD	Sck	SckY	Fum	Lost
2011	BAL	0	0	DNP																		
2012	BAL	0	0	DNP																		
2014	BAL	0	0	DNP																		
2017	BUF	1	1	0–1	17	37	45.9	134	3.6	16	0	1	44.2	7	27	3.9	9	0	2	15	0	0
2022	NYG	0	0	DNP																		
Total		1	1	0–1	17	37	45.9	134	3.6	16	0	1	44.2	7	27	3.9	9	0	2	15	0	0

=== College ===
Year	Team	Games			Passing								Rushing			
Year	Team	GP	GS	Record	Cmp	Att	Pct	Yds	Y/A	TD	Int	Rtg	Att	Yds	Avg	TD
2007	Virginia Tech	11	5	5–0	72	134	53.7	927	6.9	5	3	119.7	102	429	4.2	6
2008	Virginia Tech	12	10	8–2	99	173	57.2	1,036	6.0	2	**7**	103.2	**147**	**738**	**5.0**	**7**
2009	Virginia Tech	13	13	10–3	136	243	56.0	2,311	**9.5**	13	5	149.4	106	370	3.5	5
2010	Virginia Tech	**14**	**14**	11–3	**188**	**315**	**59.7**	**2,743**	8.7	**24**	5	**154.8**	146	659	4.5	5
Career		50	42	34–8	495	865	57.2	7,017	8.1	44	20	137.5	501	2,196	4.4	23

== Career highlights ==
=== Awards and honors ===
NFL

- Super Bowl champion (XLVII)
- Pro Bowl (2015)

College

- ACC Player of the Year (2010)
- ACC Offensive Player of the Year (2010)
- First-team All-ACC (2010)
- Dudley Award (2010)

=== Bills franchise records ===
- Highest completion percentage in single game: 91.7%
- Most consecutive pass attempts without an interception: 222

Former Bills records

- Most rushing yards in a game by a quarterback: 79
- Most rushing yards in a season by a quarterback: 580
- Most career rushing yards by a quarterback: 1,575
- Highest career passer rating, 500 or more passes thrown: 92.5
- Highest career completion percentage, 500 or more passes thrown: 62.6
- First quarterback to post back-to-back-to-back seasons with over 400 yards rushing: 2015–17
- First quarterback to post back-to-back seasons with over 500 yards rushing: 2015–16

== Player profile ==
Despite a smaller-than-average frame for an NFL quarterback, Taylor has received praise for his athleticism, work ethic, and elusiveness in the pocket and as a runner. He is also noted for his low turnover rate (the second lowest among passers with at least 1,000 attempts as of 2019), though critics also point out his conservative playing style, often labeling him as a "game manager" in a similar mold as players such as Alex Smith.

== Personal life ==
Taylor lists Steve Young, Warren Moon, Michael Vick, and Allen Iverson as his biggest athletic inspirations. Taylor is a Christian, having been raised in the faith by his parents. In 2020, Taylor made a $25,000 contribution via his foundation to the Virginia Peninsula Foodbank during the COVID-19 pandemic.

Upon joining the Browns and being featured on Hard Knocks, a minor controversy on how to pronounce Taylor's first name emerged. While the vast majority of people, including TV analysts and Taylor's father and coaches, had been pronouncing it "TIE-rod" for years, Browns guard Joel Bitonio and fourth-string quarterback Brogan Roback were heard on the show pronouncing it "tuh-ROD", which was supported by Taylor's mother and the Browns' senior vice president of operations. When asked about it, Taylor quipped that while he had heard "TIE-rod" most of his life and went with it, his mother gave him the name "tuh-ROD", but that she "doesn't call [him] by [his] first name".

In June 2024, Taylor joined the ownership group for Westchester SC, a professional soccer club to begin play in USL League One.
