= James "Shack" Harris =

American football player and administrator (born 1947)

James Harris
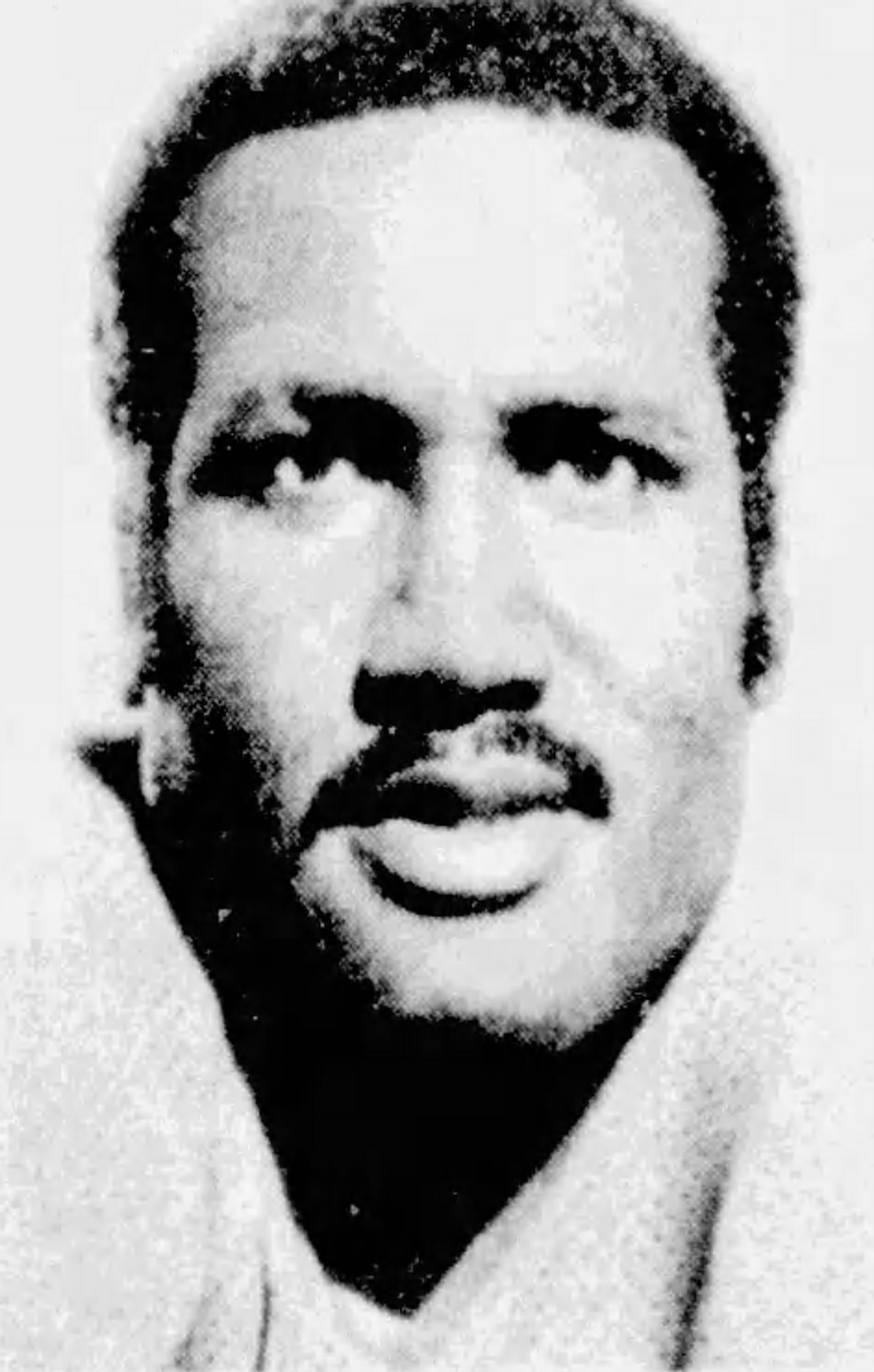
- Harris c. 1977

No. 12, 11
- Position: Quarterback

Personal information
- Born: July 20, 1947 (age 79); Monroe, Louisiana, U.S.
- Listed height: 6 ft 4 in (1.93 m)
- Listed weight: 210 lb (95 kg)

Career information
- High school: Carroll (Monroe)
- College: Grambling State
- NFL draft: 1969: 8th round, 192nd overall pick

Career history

Playing
- Buffalo Bills (1969–1972); Los Angeles Rams (1973–1976); San Diego Chargers (1977–1979)

Operations
- Tampa Bay Buccaneers (1987–1992) Scout; New York Jets (1993–1996) Assistant general manager; Baltimore Ravens (1997–2003) Director of pro personnel; Jacksonville Jaguars (2003–2008) Vice president of player personnel (Note: General manager); Detroit Lions (2009–2014) Senior personnel executive

Awards and highlights
- As player: Pro Bowl (1974); As administrator: Super Bowl champion (XXXV)

Career NFL/AFL statistics
- Passing attempts: 1,149
- Passing completions: 607
- Completion percentage: 52.8%
- TD–INT: 45–59
- Passing yards: 8,136
- Passer rating: 67.3
- Stats at Pro Football Reference

James Larnell "Shack" Harris (born July 20, 1947) is an American former professional football player and executive. He played as a quarterback in the American Football League (AFL) and the National Football League (NFL) with the Buffalo Bills, Los Angeles Rams, and San Diego Chargers. In 1969, Harris became the first Black quarterback to start a season opener for the either the AFL or NFL, and in 1974, he became the first Black quarterback to start an NFL playoff game. After his playing career, Harris worked in the front office for the Detroit Lions, Jacksonville Jaguars, New York Jets, Tampa Bay Buccaneers, and Baltimore Ravens, where he was a part of the Super Bowl XXXV-winning team.

== Early life ==
Harris grew up in Monroe, Louisiana. He is the son of Lula B. and father, Nashall Harris, Sr., a furniture maker and minister. His older sister is Lucille Richards, and his older brother is Nashall Harris, Jr., who was called "Meshach" that morphed into "Shack." James, the younger brother, was called "Little Shack." When his older brother left home to join the Army, and James grew to six feet-four inches, the family dropped the "Little" from his nickname to just "Shack."

Harris attended Carroll High in Monroe, where he led the football team to a Louisiana state championship in his sophomore year, and two perfect seasons. He was twice named to the all state football team. A straight-A student, Harris also played on the school's baseball team.

== College football career ==
Harris played college football for HBCU Grambling State University from 1965 to 1968, and as a three-year starter led the Tigers to a 24–5–1 record. Coached by legendary Grambling coach Eddie Robinson, Harris and his teammates won or shared all four Southwestern Athletic Conference (SWAC) titles during his college career. Harris was specifically trained as a prototypical pocket-passer-by Robinson and broke numerous passing records at Grambling. In 1967, he was named MVP of the Orange Blossom Classic.

In 2023, Grambling renamed its football field, the "James "Shack" Harris and Doug Williams Field at Eddie G. Robinson Memorial Stadium," to honor the university's most prominent football alumni.

== Professional football career ==
=== Buffalo Bills ===
Harris was drafted in the eighth round of the 1969 Common draft by the American Football League's Buffalo Bills, and would soon join fellow rookie O. J. Simpson in the starting backfield.

Continuing the American Football League's more liberal (than the NFL's) personnel policies, the Bills made Harris the first black player to start a season at quarterback in the history of pro football.

Harris was also just the second black player in the modern era to start in any game as quarterback for a professional football team. Wide receiver Marlin Briscoe, of the AFL's Denver Broncos, had been the first to start a game at quarterback in 1968, and a few of Harris's completions in 1969 went to Briscoe, who, by that time, had been traded to the Bills and had been converted to the position of receiver. In the first game of the season against the defending champion New York Jets, he went 3-of-12 for 74 yards with an interception while making a run for six yards before being replaced by Jack Kemp (playing his final season) as the Bills were trounced 33–19. It was his only start for the season, and Harris threw just 24 total passes combined in the other three games he appeared in as the team went 4–10. He scored his first touchdown on a throw to Haven Moses for 39 yards in a 50–21 loss to the Oakland Raiders. He made no starts in 1970, going 24-of-50 for 338 yards with three touchdowns and four interceptions in a year where the Bills went 3–10–1 while using newly drafted Dennis Shaw as their main starter. For his third and last year with the team, he made two starts (both losses) with seven appearances, going 51-of-103 for 512 total yards with one touchdown and six interceptions. After three years with the Bills, Harris was released by the team and signed by the Los Angeles Rams in 1972.

=== Los Angeles Rams ===
In 1973, Harris was the understudy to veteran John Hadl as the Rams went 12–2 and returned to the playoffs for the first time since 1969. As the 1974 season began, the Rams offense sputtered under Hadl and the team stood at 3–2 after five games. In an effort to spark the Los Angeles offense, Rams head coach Chuck Knox promoted Harris as the starting quarterback. In his starting debut for the Rams against the San Francisco 49ers, Harris completed 12 of 15 passes for 276 yards and three touchdowns and rushed for another as the Rams won easily, 37–14, at the Los Angeles Coliseum. The performance earned Harris a perfect passer rating for the game. Two days later, Hadl was then traded to Green Bay, and Harris became the Rams' first-string quarterback for the remainder of the 1974 season. The football world was stunned by the bold move. However, Harris came through by leading the team to seven wins in its last nine regular-season games. He led the team to its second straight NFC Western Division title, as well as their first playoff victory (19–10 over the Washington Redskins) since 1951. Harris thus became the first African-American quarterback to start and win an NFL playoff game. The Rams lost the NFC Championship Game to the Minnesota Vikings 14–10. Harris was named to the NFC Pro Bowl team in 1974 and was awarded MVP of that game.

The strong-armed Harris helped lead the team to another division title in 1975. Harris, in turn, became the first Black quarterback to open a season as his team's starter in National Football League history. However, he injured his shoulder very early in the Rams' Week 13 win over the Green Bay Packers; backup Ron Jaworski then led the Rams to wins against Green Bay and the Super Bowl Champion Pittsburgh Steelers, as well as to a 35–23 win over the St. Louis Cardinals in the divisional playoff game. Knox named Harris the starter for the NFC Championship games vs. Dallas. Harris' first pass was intercepted, and after one more incompletion and a Dallas 21-0 first-quarter lead, he was pulled in favor of Jaworski. It didn't matter as Dallas went on to a 37–7 win.

Harris' injuries continued to give him problems in the 1976 season. The Rams went with three quarterbacks; Harris, Jaworski, and rookie Pat Haden from USC. With Harris injured, Jaworski opened the season as the starter and was injured in the opener. Haden led the team to a comeback tie against the Minnesota Vikings in the second game. Harris, with his throwing shoulder mended, reclaimed his starting job and led the team to two wins, including a 436-yard passing performance against the Miami Dolphins. However, in the next game, on Monday night at home against the San Francisco 49ers, Harris was sacked 10 times and re-injured his shoulder as the Rams were shut out 16–0 at home for the first time since moving to Los Angeles. The Jaworski/Haden platoon led the team to two more wins, then Harris returned again for a win over the then-first-year Seattle Seahawks and a loss to the Cincinnati Bengals. Against the Bengals, however, Harris played poorly and Knox felt like Harris was not fully healthy. After the game, Knox decided to go with Haden as the starter for the rest of the season. There was speculation that owner Carroll Rosenbloom instructed Knox replace Harris with Haden.Under Haden, the Rams won three out of four and the NFC West division title. Knox stuck with Haden in the 1976 playoffs, even though Harris was healthy enough to see action late in the season, including a season-ending comeback win over the Detroit Lions. Haden rushed for a touchdown in the 14-12 playoff win at Dallas. In the NFC title game, the Minnesota special teams and defense led the Vikings to a 24–13 victory to advance to Super Bowl XI. Despite the benching, Harris' 89.6 passer rating that year was tied for the highest in the NFC. It was the first time a black quarterback ever led his conference in that category.

=== San Diego Chargers ===
Harris was released to the San Diego Chargers prior to the 1977 season. The experience with the Rams hurt him. "I lost my passion," he said in the book Third and a Mile. "Coach Knox was supportive but the owner Carroll Rosenbloom was going over his head.

"As a quarterback, I had done all I could, more than most people could, but it still wasn't enough for the Los Angeles Rams organization to accept me as a quarterback, not a black quarterback," he commented. At the time of his departure, Harris held the highest career completion average of any quarterback in Rams team history (55.4%) and had been an integral part of three straight NFC West Champions. Harris was deeply upset by his trade from a perennial playoff team to a team in rebuilding mode and also by losing his status as a starting quarterback. Nonetheless, Harris maintained a good relationship with Chuck Knox until the latter's death in 2018.

He made nine starts in his first year due to Dan Fouts holding out for more money, going 4–5 while throwing 109-for-211 with 1,240 yards, five touchdowns and 11 interceptions. The following year, he played in nine games while starting two of them, throwing 42-of-88 for 518 yards, two touchdowns and nine interceptions. Harris last saw playing time in 1979, appearing in eight games and throwing just 5-of-9 for 38 yards with an interception.

Harris is thought to be the inspiration for the NFL films song, "Ramblin' Man From Gramblin'" composed by Sam Spence.

== NFL/AFL career statistics ==
Legend
	Led the league
**Bold**	Career high

=== Regular season ===
Year	Team	Games			Passing									Rushing					Sacks	
Year	Team	GP	GS	Record	Cmp	Att	Pct	Yds	Y/A	Lng	TD	Int	Rtg	Att	Yds	Avg	Lng	TD	Sck	Yds
1969	BUF	4	1	0–1	15	36	41.7	270	7.5	55	1	1	65.7	10	25	2.5	9	0	9	70
1970	BUF	7	0	—	24	50	48.0	338	6.8	32	3	4	56.9	3	-8	-2.7	1	0	7	63
1971	BUF	7	2	0–2	51	103	49.5	512	5.0	62	1	6	43.0	6	42	7.0	13	0	16	145
1973	RAM	8	0	—	7	11	**63.6**	68	6.2	27	0	0	80.9	4	29	**7.3**	19	0	0	0
1974	RAM	11	9	7–2	106	198	53.5	1,544	7.8	50	11	6	85.1	**42**	**112**	2.7	15	**5**	12	101
1975	RAM	13	13	**11–2**	**157**	**285**	55.1	2,148	7.5	54	**14**	**15**	73.8	18	45	2.5	15	1	**21**	**180**
1976	RAM	7	5	3–2	91	158	57.6	1,460	**9.2**	**80**	8	6	**89.6**	12	76	6.3	**20**	2	14	151
1977	SDG	9	9	4–5	109	211	51.7	1,240	5.9	78	5	11	55.8	10	13	1.3	12	2	12	106
1978	SDG	9	2	0–2	42	88	47.7	518	5.9	34	2	9	34.4	10	7	0.7	9	0	8	43
1979	SDG	8	0	—	5	9	55.6	38	4.2	10	0	1	26.4	6	26	4.3	18	0	2	15
Career		83	41	25–16	607	1,149	52.8	8,136	7.1	80	45	59	67.3	121	367	3.0	20	10	101	874

=== Playoffs ===
Year	Team	Games			Passing									Rushing					Sacks	
Year	Team	GP	GS	Record	Cmp	Att	Pct	Yds	Y/A	Lng	TD	Int	Rtg	Att	Yds	Avg	Lng	TD	Sck	Yds
1973	RAM	1	0	—	0	0	0.0	0	0.0	0	0	0	0.0	0	0	0.0	0	0	0	0
1974	RAM	2	2	**1–1**	**21**	**47**	**44.7**	**343**	**7.3**	**73**	**2**	**4**	**48.4**	**9**	**34**	**3.8**	**8**	0	**2**	**29**
1975	RAM	1	1	0–1	0	2	0.0	0	0.0	0	0	0	0.0	0	0	0.0	0	0	0	0
Career		4	3	1–2	21	49	42.9	343	7.0	73	2	5	41.0	9	34	3.8	29	0	2	29

== Front office career ==
In 1987, Harris began his front office career with the Tampa Bay Buccaneers. He worked as team scout for six years, and then signed with the New York Jets as the team's assistant general manager for three years until 1996.

Harris served as the Baltimore Ravens Director of Pro Personnel from 1997 to 2003. During his tenure, the Ravens won Super Bowl XXXV. In 2003, Harris left the Ravens organization and went on to serve as the Vice President of Player Personnel for the Jacksonville Jaguars, resigning on December 23, 2008. He also served on the NFL subcommittee on college relations.

On February 2, 2009, the Detroit Free Press reported that the Detroit Lions were set to hire Harris as a personnel executive. On February 12, 2009, the Detroit Lions officially named Harris as Senior Personnel Executive. Lions General Manager Martin Mayhew has a long history with Harris, and indicated he was the only individual who was offered the job. Harris assisted in all areas of player personnel in an advisory role.

Harris officially retired from the NFL on February 27, 2015.

== Shack Harris & Doug Williams Foundation ==
In collaboration with Doug Williams, Harris established the Shack Harris & Doug Williams Foundation in 2005. In 2009 and 2010, Harris and Williams played pivotal roles in establishing the Black College Football Hall of Fame (BCF-HOF). The BCF-HOF ceremonies are presented annually by the Shack Harris & Doug Williams Foundation.

== Personal ==
Harris and his wife, Vickie, have four children: Lisa, James, Ashley, and Aaron.

== Honors and awards ==
- Black College Football Hall of Fame, Class of 2012
- Featured, "Field Generals: Third and a Mile: The Trials and Triumphs of the Black Quarterback," ESPN, 2007
- Grambling Legends Hall of Fame
- Historical Marker: James "Shack" Harris, Grambling, Louisiana.
- Louisiana Sports Hall of Fame
- Most Powerful African Americans in Sports, Black Enterprise, 2005
- National Quarterback Club Hall of Fame
- Onyx Awards of Achievement in Sports, Onyx Magazine, 2023
- Paul "Tank" Younger Award, "for his efforts to promote diversity and equity in sports," Fritz Pollard Alliance, 2006
- Southwestern Athletic Conference Hall of Fame
- Top 50 Most Influential Minorities, Sports Illustrated, 2003 and 2004

== See also ==
- List of American Football League players
- Racial issues faced by black quarterbacks
