= 1960 Houston Oilers season =

NFL team season (inaugural)

- Owner: Bud Adams
- General manager: Don Suman
- Head coach: Lou Rymkus
- Home stadium: Jeppesen Stadium

Results
- Record: 10–4
- Division place: 1st AFL Eastern
- Playoffs: Won AFL Championship (vs. Chargers) 24–16

The 1960 Houston Oilers season was the first season for the Houston Oilers as a professional American football franchise; Head Coach Lou Rymkus led the Oilers to the AFL Eastern Division title, with a 10–4 record. It was also the first American Football League season. It ended with a 24–16 victory in the AFL championship game at home over the Los Angeles Chargers (10–4).

== Player movements ==
=== AFL draft ===
In the 1960 AFL draft, the Houston Oilers selected the following players.

- Peter Arena, G, Northwestern
- Dick Bass, HB, College of Pacific
- William Bohler, E/T, St. Ambrose
- Larry Cadwell, T, Louisville
- Billy Cannon, HB, Louisiana State
- Doug Cline, LB, Clemson
- DeJustice Coleman, HB, Illinois
- Bob Crandall, HB, New Mexico
- Cleatus Drinnon, C, Hardin–Simmons
- John Gremer, G, Illinois
- George Herring, G/T, North Texas State
- Steve Johnson, QB, Pepperdine
- John Lands, E, Montana
- Jacky Lee, QB, Cincinnati
- Bruce Maher, HB, Detroit
- Don Mattson, T, Southern California
- Mike McGee G, Duke
- Hugh McInnis, E, Mississippi State
- Max Messner, T, Cincinnati
- George Mulholland, E, New Mexico State
- Gary O'Steen, HB, Alabama
- Gene Prebola, E, Boston University
- Palmer Pyle T, Michigan State
- William Roach, T, Texas Christian
- Robert Simms, E, Rutgers
- Phillip Snowden, QB, Missouri
- Don Underwood, G/T, McNeese State
- Duane Whetstone, FB, George Washington
- Bob White FB, Ohio State
- Maury Youmans, T, Syracuse

=== Regular season ===
- The Oilers scored an important victory over the NFL when they signed the Heisman Trophy winner, All-America running back Billy Cannon of LSU. Cannon joined other Oiler offensive stars such as veteran quarterback George Blanda.

== Roster ==
1960 Houston Oilers roster
Quarterbacks: 16 George Blanda K; 15 Jacky Lee; 12 Charlie Milstead P; Running backs: 20 Billy Cannon; 31 Doug Cline; 21 Ken Hall; 32 Dave Smith; 44 Charley Tolar; 33 Bob White; Wide receivers: 89 Bill Groman; 37 Charley Hennigan; Tight ends: 82 Johnny Carson; 86 John White	Offensive linemen: 57 George Belotti C; 65 Gary Greaves T; 70 Al Jamison T; 51 John Simerson T; 61 Bob Talamini G; 63 Hogan Wharton G; Defensive linemen: 80 Dalva Allen DE; 75 Don Floyd DE; 72 Jerry Helluin DT; 73 Dan Lanphear DE; 74 George Shirkey DT; 79 Orville Trask DT	Linebackers: 30 Mike Dukes OLB; 50 Dennit Morris MLB; 53 Hugh Pitts OLB; 88 Al Witcher OLB/ WR; Defensive backs: 40 Tony Banfield CB; 47 Bobby Gordon FS; 41 Mark Johnston CB; 34 Charlie Kendall CB; 43 Jim Norton CB/S; 24 Julian Spence SS	Reserve lists: 62 Wahoo McDaniel G (IR); 77 Rich Michael T (IR); 56 Phil Perlo LB (IR); 64 Fred Wallner G (Retired); rookies in italics

== Preseason ==
=== Schedule ===
Week	Date	Opponent	Result	Record	Venue	Attendance	Recap
1	August 6	vs. Dallas Texans	L 10–27	0–1	Skelly Field	12,000	
2	August 11	at Los Angeles Chargers	L 13–22	0–2	Los Angeles Memorial Coliseum	11,500	
3	August 20	Denver Broncos	W 42–3	1–2	Jeppesen Stadium	19,500	
4	August 26	vs. New York Titans	W 30–14	2–2	Ladd Memorial Stadium	10,000	
5	September 2	at Dallas Texans	L 3–24	2–3	Cotton Bowl	51,000	

== Regular season ==
=== Schedule ===
Week	Date	Opponent	Result	Record	Venue	Attendance	Game Recap
1	September 11	at Oakland Raiders	**W** 37–22	1–0	Kezar Stadium	12,703	Recap
2	September 18	Los Angeles Chargers	**W** 38–28	2–0	Jeppesen Stadium	20,156	Recap
3	September 25	Oakland Raiders	**L** 13–14	2–1	Jeppesen Stadium	16,421	Recap
4	Bye						
5	October 9	**New York Titans**	**W** 27–21	3–1	Jeppesen Stadium	16,151	Recap
6	October 16	Dallas Texans	**W** 20–10	4–1	Jeppesen Stadium	19,026	Recap
7	October 23	at **New York Titans**	**W** 42–28	5–1	Polo Grounds	21,000	Recap
8	October 30	at **Buffalo Bills**	**L** 24–25	5–2	War Memorial Stadium	23,001	Recap
9	November 6	at Denver Broncos	**W** 45–25	6–2	Bears Stadium	14,489	Recap
10	November 13	at Los Angeles Chargers	**L** 21–24	6–3	Los Angeles Memorial Coliseum	21,805	Recap
11	November 20	Denver Broncos	**W** 20–10	7–3	Jeppesen Stadium	20,778	Recap
12	November 25	at **Boston Patriots**	**W** 24–10	8–3	Nickerson Field	27,123	Recap
13	December 4	at Dallas Texans	**L** 0–24	8–4	Cotton Bowl	20,000	Recap
14	December 11	**Buffalo Bills**	**W** 31–23	9–4	Jeppesen Stadium	25,247	Recap
15	December 18	**Boston Patriots**	**W** 37–21	10–4	Jeppesen Stadium	22,352	Recap
Note: Intra-division opponents are in **bold** text.

== Regular season game summaries ==
=== Week 1 (Sunday, September 11, 1960): at Oakland Raiders ===
Week 1: Houston Oilers at Oakland Raiders

Quarter	1	2	3	4	Total
Oilers	7	0	13	17	37
Raiders	0	7	7	8	22

at Kezar Stadium, San Francisco, California

- Date: September 11
- Game weather: 66 °F (19 °C)
- Game attendance: 12,703
- Recap

=== Week 2 (Sunday, September 18, 1960): vs. Los Angeles Chargers ===
Week 2: Los Angeles Chargers 28 at Houston Oilers 38 – Game summary

Quarter	1	2	3	4	Total
Chargers (1–1)	7	7	0	14	28
Oilers (2–0)	14	7	17	0	38

at Jeppesen Stadium • Houston, Texas

- Date: September 18, 1960
- Game time: 2:30 p.m. CST
- Game weather: 80 °F or 26.7 °C, relative humidity 72%, wind 4 miles per hour (6.4 km/h; 3.5 kn)
- Game attendance: 20,156
- TV announcers (ABC): Jack Buck (play–by–play) and Dick Danehe (color commentator)

Team	Category	Player	Statistics
LAC	Passing		
LAC	Rushing		
LAC	Receiving		
HOU	Passing		
HOU	Rushing		
HOU	Receiving		

Scoring summary

Quarter	Time	Drive			Team	Scoring information	Score	
Quarter	Time	Plays	Yards	TOP	Team	Scoring information	LAC	HOU
"TOP" = time of possession. For other American football terms, see Glossary of American football.							28	38

- Point spread: Oilers –6½
- Time of game:

Chargers	Game statistics	Oilers
	First downs	
	Rushes–yards	
	Passing yards	
	Passes	
	Sacked–yards	
	Net passing yards	
	Total yards	
	Return yards	
	Punts	
	Fumbles–lost	
	Penalties–yards	
	Time of possession	

=== Week 3 (Sunday, September 25, 1960): vs. Oakland Raiders ===
Week 3: Oakland Raiders at Houston Oilers

Quarter	1	2	3	4	Total
Raiders	7	0	0	7	14
Oilers	0	10	3	0	13

at Jeppesen Stadium, Houston, Texas

- Date: September 20
- Game weather: 72 °F (22 °C)
- Game attendance: 16,421
- Recap

=== Week 10 (Sunday, November 13, 1960): at Los Angeles Chargers ===
Week 10: Houston Oilers 21 at Los Angeles Chargers 24 – Game summary

Quarter	1	2	3	4	Total
Oilers (6–3)	0	14	0	7	21
Chargers (6–3)	14	7	3	0	24

at Los Angeles Memorial Coliseum • Los Angeles, California

- Date: November 13
- Game time: 3:30 p.m. CST
- Game weather: 56 °F or 13.3 °C, relative humidity 85%, wind 9 miles per hour (14 km/h; 7.8 kn)
- Game attendance: 21,085
- TV announcers (ABC): Jack Buck (play–by–play) and Elmer Angsman (color commentator)

Team	Category	Player	Statistics
HOU	Passing		
HOU	Rushing		
HOU	Receiving		
LAC	Passing		
LAC	Rushing		
LAC	Receiving		

Scoring summary

Quarter	Time	Drive			Team	Scoring information	Score	
Quarter	Time	Plays	Yards	TOP	Team	Scoring information	HOU	LAC
"TOP" = time of possession. For other American football terms, see Glossary of American football.							21	24

- Point spread: Oilers Pick'em
- Time of game:

Oilers	Game statistics	Chargers
	First downs	
	Rushes–yards	
	Passing yards	
	Passes	
	Sacked–yards	
	Net passing yards	
	Total yards	
	Return yards	
	Punts	
	Fumbles–lost	
	Penalties–yards	
	Time of possession	

=== Notable stats ===
Player	Comp.	Att.	Comp%	Yards	TD's	INT's
George Blanda (HOU)	169	363	46.6	2413	24	22

== Standings ==
AFL Eastern Division
	W	L	T	PCT	DIV	PF	PA	STK
Houston Oilers	10	4	0	.714	5–1	379	285	W2
New York Titans	7	7	0	.500	2–4	382	399	L1
Buffalo Bills	5	8	1	.385	3–3	296	303	L2
Boston Patriots	5	9	0	.357	2–4	286	349	L4

Note: Tie games were not officially counted in the standings in the AFL.

== Postseason ==
Round	Date	Opponent	Result	Venue	Attendance	Recap
AFL Championship	January 1	Los Angeles Chargers	W 24–16	Jeppesen Stadium	32,183	Recap

=== 1960 AFL Championship Game (Sunday, January 1, 1961): vs. Los Angeles Chargers ===
1960 AFL Championship Game: Los Angeles Chargers 16 at Houston Oilers 24 – Game summary

Quarter	1	2	3	4	Total
Chargers (0–1)	6	3	7	0	16
Oilers (1–0)	0	10	7	7	24

at Jeppesen Stadium • Houston, Texas

- Date: January 1, 1961
- Game time: 2:30 p.m. CST
- Game weather: 45 °F or 7 °C, relative humidity 82%, wind 8 miles per hour (13 km/h; 7.0 kn)
- Game attendance: 32,183
- Referee: John McDonough
- TV announcers (ABC): Jack Buck (play–by–play), George Ratterman (color commentator) and Les Keiter (sideline reporter)

Team	Category	Player	Statistics
LAC	Passing	Jack Kemp	21/41, 171 YDS, 2 INTs
LAC	Rushing	Paul Lowe	21 CAT, 165 YDS, 1 TD
LAC	Receiving	Don Norton; Royce Womble	6 REC, 55 YDS; 6 REC, 29 YDS
HOU	Passing	George Blanda	16/31, 301 YDS, 3 TDs
HOU	Rushing	Billy Cannon	18 CAR, 50 YDS
HOU	Receiving	Dave Smith	5 REC, 52 YDS, 1 TD

Scoring summary

Quarter	Time	Drive			Team	Scoring information	Score	
Quarter	Time	Plays	Yards	TOP	Team	Scoring information	LAC	HOU
1					Chargers	38-yard field goal by Agajanian	3	0
1					Chargers	22-yard field goal by Agajanian	6	0
2					Oilers	Smith 17-yard touchdown reception from Blanda, Blanda kick good	6	7
2					Chargers	27-yard field goal by Agajanian	9	7
2					Oilers	17-yard field goal by Blanda	9	10
3					Oilers	Groman 7-yard touchdown reception from Blanda, Blanda kick good	9	17
3					Chargers	Lowe 2-yard touchdown run, Agajanian kick good	16	17
4					Oilers	Cannon 88-yard touchdown reception from Blanda, Blanda kick good	16	24
"TOP" = time of possession. For other American football terms, see Glossary of American football.							16	24

- Point spread: Oilers –5
- Time of game:

Chargers	Game statistics	Oilers
21	First downs	17
30–190	Rushes–yards	40–100
171	Passing yards	301
21–41–2	Passes	16–32–0
3–28	Sacked–yards	0–0
143	Net passing yards	301
333	Total yards	401
165	Return yards	153
4–41.0	Punts	5–34.0
2–0	Fumbles–lost	0–0
3–15	Penalties–yards	4–54
	Time of possession	
