= Charley Hennigan =

American football player (1935–2017)

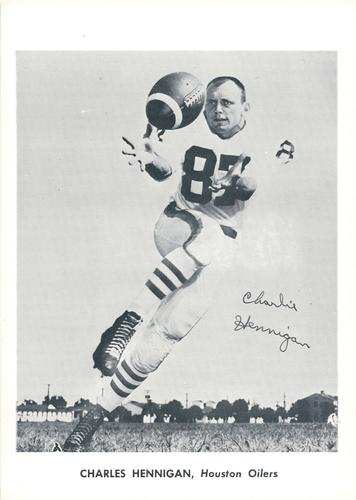

No. 37, 87
- Position: Wide receiver

Personal information
- Born: March 19, 1935; Bienville, Louisiana, U.S.
- Died: December 20, 2017 (aged 82); Humble, Texas, U.S.
- Listed height: 6 ft 1 in (1.85 m)
- Listed weight: 187 lb (85 kg)

Career information
- High school: Minden (Minden, Louisiana)
- College: Northwestern State
- NFL draft: 1960: undrafted

Career history
- Houston Oilers (1960–1966)

Awards and highlights
- 2× AFL champion (1960, 1961); 4× First-team All-AFL (1961–1964); 5× AFL All-Star (1961–1965); 2× AFL receiving yards leader (1961, 1964); AFL receptions leader (1964); American Football League All-Time Team; Most receiving yards in a single calendar month - 822 (October 1961)

Career NFL statistics
- Receptions: 410
- Receiving yards: 6,823
- Receiving touchdowns: 51
- Stats at Pro Football Reference

Charles "Charlie" Taylor Hennigan Sr. (March 19, 1935 – December 20, 2017), also known as Charley Hennigan, was an American professional football player who was a wide receiver with the former Houston Oilers of the American Football League (AFL). He attended Louisiana State University (LSU) for one year where he was on the track and field team, and then transferred to Northwestern State College where he was both on the track team and played college football for the Northwestern State Demons. Hennigan was a five-time AFL All-Star and was a three-time first-team All-AFL selection. He was named to the AFL All-Time Team's second team. Hennigan's career was cut short by a knee injury in 1966 after seven seasons, but he was in the top ten all-time in receptions and receiving yards when his career ended.

Hennigan set, or was a part of, numerous professional football receiving records. In 1961, during a 14-game season, Hennigan set a single season AFL/NFL record of 1,746 receiving yards, not broken until 1995 by Jerry Rice and Isaac Bruce. That 1961 record has been exceeded by ten players in total (through 2025), all playing during longer seasons of 16 or 17 games. Through the 2025 season, no player had surpassed Hennigan's 1,746 receiving yards in his team's first 14 games of a season.

Hennigan's 1961 record for most games with 100 or more yards receiving (10) in a season stood until 1995, when it was broken by Michael Irvin. In 1964, Hennigan set the AFL/NFL record with 101 receptions in a season; a record that stood until 1984 when Art Monk had 106 receptions in a 16-game season, and which has only been exceeded by players in 16- or 17-game seasons. The players breaking these records Hennigan set (Bruce, Irvin, Monk, and Rice) are all in the Pro Football Hall of Fame.

He was a member of the 1955 LSU mile relay team that won the Southeastern Conference championship. At Northwestern State he set school records in the 440-yard dash and 880-yard run, and was a Gulf States Conference (GSC) champion in those events, as well winning GSC championships as a member of relay teams. He was also a member of the Northwestern State football team that tied for the GSC title in 1957. Hennigan was named first-team All-GSC at halfback in 1957.

== Early life ==
Hennigan was born on March 19, 1935, in Bienville, Louisiana to C. Roland and Lura (Taylor) Hennigan. He was one of four children. His family moved to in Minden, Louisiana in 1943. Lura Hennigan served in the ministry and became the founder and pastor of Bethel Faith Temple Church in the 1950s.

Hennigan attended Minden High School. He was a member of the school's track and field team, football team, and basketball team. In May 1952, he was Louisiana's Class A 880-yard run high school track champion. In 1953, he won the 880-yard state championship again (also placing fourth in the 120-yard high hurdles).

Hennigan was a receiver on the Minden Crimson Tide football team. In 1952, the 160 lb (72.3 kg) Hennigan was honorable mention All-State as a receiver in football. He made the All-North Louisiana teams in football and track. Hennigan also played on Minden's basketball team.

== College career ==
Because of his slight frame, Hennigan was considered a better athletic prospect as a runner in track and field, rather than as a football player. He originally attended Louisiana State University (LSU) on a track scholarship, focusing on his running the half-mile race. As a freshman, he solely participated in track at LSU, excelling in the half-mile run, and was not on the football team. However, Hennigan was unhappy at LSU for two reasons. He had been raised in a small town and was unaccustomed to being among large numbers of people, and he found LSU too big for his liking. Hennigan also wanted to play football, which he could not do at LSU, at least in part because he was so undersized as a freshman compared to the players who would be his teammates there.

LSU track coach Al Moreau and football coach Gaynell Tinsley convinced Hennigan not to leave LSU during his freshman year (1953–54). He stayed at LSU, placing fourth in the Southeastern Conference (SEC) in the 880-yard run and was part of LSU's SEC championship mile-relay team in 1954. After completing one year at LSU, Hennigan transferred to Northwestern State University (then Northwestern State College) in Natchitoches, Louisiana, where he was able to participate in track and play football.

In May 1956 at Northwestern State, Hennigan set four school track records: in the quarter-mile run (47.9 seconds), the half-mile run (1 minute, 54.3 seconds), and as the anchor runner on two relay teams. That year, he was the Gulf States Conference champion in the 440-yard dash and 880-yard run. The 1956 track team won its fourth straight Gulf States Conference championship. In late March 1957, Hennigan anchored the mile relay and sprint medley relay teams that won the 80-school college division NSC relays. As a track star, his nickname was "the Horse".

Hennigan was unsuccessful playing end on the football team for the Northwestern State Demons as a sophomore because of his size (1955), and was moved to halfback for his junior (1956) and senior years (1957). As a halfback in 1956, he rushed for 354 yards, and caught three passes for 36 yards. In the 1956 game against arch-rival Louisiana Tech, Hennigan rushed for 50 yards, had a pass reception, and intercepted a fourth quarter pass while playing defense.

As a senior in 1957, he was co-captain of the football team that was co-champion of the Gulf States Conference. One of Hennigan's Northwestern State teammates was fullback Charley Tolar, who would become Hennigan's teammate with the Houston Oilers during the length of their AFL careers (1960 to 1966). In 1957, Hennigan was second on the team in rushing (behind Tolar) with 458 yards on 111 carries, second in pass receptions with 12 for 143 yards, and second in scoring with 36 points on six rushing touchdowns. He averaged nearly 51 yards per game in offense that season.

The Associated Press (AP) named Hennigan and Tolar first-team All-Gulf States Conference in 1957. He set a school record of 47.2 seconds in the 440-yard dash that still stood in 1973. He was a member of Northwestern State football and track teams that combined for five Gulf States Conference championships. He was coached by Walter Ledet at Northwestern State.

== Professional career ==
Hennigan was not selected in the 1958 National Football League draft after graduating. In May 1958, Hennigan signed a contract with the Edmonton Eskimos of the Western Interprovincial Football Union (later the West Division of the Canadian Football League (CFL)), but lasted only one month. After leaving Edmonton in 1958, he was given a commission in the United States Army as a second lieutenant under the ROTC program, and was assigned for six months to serve at Fort Sill in Oklahoma. He was next assigned to serve as a paratrooper at Fort Benning in Georgia. After leaving the military, Henningan worked for one year as a biology teacher at Jonesboro-Hodge High School in Jackson Parish, Louisiana. He also served as head track coach and as an assistant coach on the school's football team.

At the end of 1959, Hennigan wrote to every professional football team in the NFL, CFL, and new American Football League (AFL) asking for a tryout. The Houston Oilers of the newly formed AFL were the only team to respond. In 1960, Hennigan hitchhiked from Louisiana to Houston to try out for the Oilers in the American Football League's inaugural season. In leaving his job, Hennigan told his employer at Jonesboro-Hodge that "I've got to do it because I love football". His teacher's salary was $2,700 per year, or $4,000 per year. Hennigan kept one of his teaching pay stubs taped to his football helmet to motivate himself, saying years later "'I used that as a motivational tool, to know I'd burned my bridges'".

Hennigan was a 25-year old rookie in his (and the Oilers) first AFL training camp, with a wife and two children. The Oilers first head coach was Lou Rymkus. During training camp, Rymkus and most of his assistant coaches wanted to release Hennigan. However, assistant coach Mac Speedie, who had been a star wide receiver in the National Football League (NFL) and would later enter the Pro Football Hall of Fame, successfully insisted that Hennigan make the team. Once Hennigan joined the team, Speedie worked with him to make Hennigan a better receiver. Hennigan also attributed support from Billy Cannon, the Oilers star rookie from Louisiana and a friend of Hennigan's, with helping him make the team. Hennigan made $7,500 under his first contract with the Oilers.

Hennigan went on to spend his entire professional career with the Oilers (1960 to 1966). After the AFL's final season as a league independent of the NFL (1969), Hennigan held four AFL records: (1) most receptions in a season (101); (2) most receiving yards in a season (1,746); (3) most receptions in a single game (13); and (4) most receiving yards in a single game (272).

=== Rookie season (1960) ===
On September 11, 1960, Hennigan scored the first touchdown in Oilers history, catching a 43-yard touchdown pass from Oilers' quarterback George Blanda in the first quarter against the Oakland Raiders. That year, Hennigan started 11 games with 44 pass receptions for 722 yards and six touchdowns, averaging 16.4 yard per catch. He and Blanda would be teammates for their entire careers in Houston.

The Oilers were 10–4 that season, winning the East Division, and led the AFL in passings yards. In the 1960 American Football League Championship Game, Hennigan caught four passes for 71 yards as the Oilers prevailed 24–16 to win the inaugural AFL title over the Los Angeles Chargers.

=== 1961 record breaking season ===
After a promising rookie season, in 1961, Hennigan started all 14 games and established himself as a superstar in the AFL by setting a single-season record with his league-leading 1,746 yards receiving. Hennigan had 82 receptions that season, second to Lionel Taylor who had 100 receptions. Hennigan averaged 21.3 yards per reception and had 12 touchdown receptions (both second in the AFL to teammate Bill Groman), and a league-leading 124.7 yards per game. In October alone, Hennigan had 822 receiving yards, with games of 101 yards,109 yards, 272 yards, 108 yards, and 232 yards; the most in a single calendar month.

Hennigan had three games with over 200 receiving yards that season. Through at least 2017, this was still the all-time record for most games in a season with over 200 yards receiving. He set the all-time AFL single game record of 272 receiving yards against the Boston Patriots on October 13, 1961; 11th most in AFL/NFL history (as of 2025). The 13 passes Hennigan caught in that game is tied for the most ever in the AFL, shared with Lance Alworth, Lionel Taylor, and Sid Blanks (on September 12, 1964 with the Oilers though Blanks has also been reported as having only 12 in that game). On October 29 against the Buffalo Bills, Hennigan had nine receptions for 232 yards and two touchdowns. This included an 80-yard touchdown reception from George Blanda. On December 3 he had ten receptions for 214 yards and three touchdowns, in a game against the San Diego Chargers.

Hennigan was selected to play in the AFL All-Star Game, and was named first-team All-AFL by the AFL, Associated Press (AP), The Sporting News, and United Press International (UPI). The Oilers were 10–3–1, and again won the East Division. They led the AFL in passing yards (4,392), with over 1,500 more yards than the next best San Diego Chargers. This was the first time in professional football a team had passed for over 4,000 yards. In the 1961 American Football League Championship Game, Hennigan had five catches for 43 yards as the Oilers prevailed over the Chargers, 10–3, for their second and final AFL title.

Hennigan's 1,746 receiving yards not only surpassed teammate Bill Groman's 1,473 receiving yard AFL record set in the AFL's inaugural season (1960), it also surpassed the National Football League record at the time of 1,495 receiving yards. The NFL record was set in 1951 by future Pro Football Hall of Fame receiver Elroy Hirsch in a 12-game season. In 1961, Hennigan had 1,541 receiving yards through 12 games.

Groman had 1,175 receiving yards for the Oilers in 1961, and he and Hennigan set a combined record for receiving yards by two receivers on the same team in a single season, 2,921 yards. That record, set in 14 games, stood until 1995 when broken by Herman Moore and Brett Perriman of the Detroit Lions in the 15th game of the 1995 season. A set of NFL rule changes in 1994 contributed to increases in receptions and receiving yards in the immediately ensuing years, such as four different receivers having over 1,600 receiving yards in 1995, when no receiver had ever done that during the nearly 30-year Super Bowl era prior to 1995.

Hennigan's AFL/NFL record for receiving yards in a season stood for 34 years until it was surpassed by both Jerry Rice and Isaac Bruce, again in 1995, over a 16-game season, both of whom are in the Pro Football Hall of Fame. Rice had 1,848 total receiving yards in 1995, but 442 of those yards came in his 15th and 16th games; and Bruce similarly had only 1,503 receiving yards after 14 games. Hennigan's 1,746 receiving yards in a season remains 11th all-time, with all ten players above him (as of 2025) exceeding his total yards in 16- or 17-game seasons. Hennigan still held the record for receiving yards through a team's first 14 games at the end of the 2025 season.

In 1961, Hennigan have over 100 yards receiving in the season's first seven games, and set a record that year with 10 games of over 100 receiving yards in a single season. This was another one of his record's that was broken in 1995. Pro Football Hall of Fame receiver Michael Irvin reached his 11th game with over 100 receiving yards in the 13th game of the 1995 season, while Hennigan's 10th game with over 100 yards receiving came in the 14th game of the 1961 season.

=== 1962 and 1963 ===
In 1962, Hennigan had 54 receptions for 867 yards with eight touchdowns. Hennigan was again selected to play in the AFL All-Star Game, and was named first-team All-AFL by the AFL, AP, and UPI. On September 16, he had eight receptions for 202 yards and two touchdowns against the Patriots (his fourth game with over 200 receiving yards). The Oilers were 11–3 and went to the AFL Championship Game for a third consecutive season. In the 1962 AFL title game, Hennigan had three receptions for 37 yards, but the Oilers lost in double overtime to the Dallas Texans, 20–17. This was the second longest game in AFL/NFL history, and longest in the AFL's ten-year history.

In 1963, he had 61 receptions for 1,051 yards, with 10 touchdown receptions. Hennigan was selected to play in the AFL All-Star Game for the third consecutive season, and was named second-team All-AFL by the Newspaper Enterprise Association (NEA) and UPI. In a September 22 game against the New York Jets he had nine receptions for 186 yards, and the following week he caught three touchdown passes from Blanda against the Buffalo Bills. In 1963, he was sixth in the AFL in receptions, fourth in receiving yards, and tied for third in receiving touchdowns.

=== 1964 record breaking season ===
In 1964, Hennigan had 101 receptions for 1,546 yards and eight touchdowns, becoming the first player in AFL/NFL history with over 1,500 receiving yards in two seasons. He led the AFL in receptions, receiving yards, and receiving yards per game (110.4). He was selected to play in the AFL All-Star Game for the fourth consecutive season, and was named first-team All-AFL by the AFL, AP, NEA, and UPI.

Hennigan's 101 receptions broke Lionel Taylor's three-year old AFL record and established the highest single season record in all of professional football history at the time (Johnny Morris holding the NFL record at 93). He had three games with over 10 receptions in 1964: 12 for 183 yards on November 29 against the Boston Patriots; 12 for 160 yards on November 1 against the Buffalo Bills; and 11 for 188 yards on September 29 against the Denver Broncos. His 101-reception record, achieved in a 14-game season, stood until 1984 when Pro Football Hall of Fame receiver Art Monk caught 106 passes in a 16-game season. Through 14 games in 1984, Monk had 88 receptions. Since 1984, well over 100 players have had more than 101 receptions in seasons of either 16 or 17 games.

=== 1965 and 1966 ===
In 1965, Hennigan had 41 receptions for 578 yards and four touchdowns. Hennigan had the most receptions of any receiver on the team, and was second to running back Ode Burrell in total receptions for the Oilers. Hennigan was selected to play in the AFL All-Star Game for the fifth consecutive, and final, time.

Hennigan had started all 14 games every season from 1961 to 1965. In 1966, he started nine games. He finished the 1966 season with 27 receptions for 313 yards and three touchdowns. Hennigan suffered a knee injury that season which later required surgery. The Oilers had asked Hennigan to play during the 1966 season knowing of his knee injury, which he did; but later criticized the Oilers for unfairly asking him to do so.

The San Diego Chargers acquired him after the 1966 season ended. Even after surgery on his knee Hennigan did not pass a physical examination with the Chargers. The Chargers released him in July 1967, ending Hennigan's professional career. It is also reported that a series of concussions contributed to ending his career.

Over his seven-year Oilers career, Hennigan started 90 games. He had 410 receptions for 6,823 yards (16.6 yards per reception) and 51 receiving touchdowns. At the time he retired in 1966, Hennigan had the ninth most receptions and tenth most receiving yards in AFL/NFL history.

== Legacy and honors ==
Sportswriter Rick Gosselin said, "You can say Bob Hayes changed the way the game is played with his speed. You can say Charley Taylor changed the way the game is played with his power. And you can say Jerry Rice changed the way the game is played with his precision and grace. . . . But no wide receiver changed the way the game is played like Charlie Hennigan". Pro Football Hall of Fame quarterback and kicker George Blanda said of Hennigan, "No man can cover him . . . He has the finest moves in the league". It was reported that Hall of Fame receiver Lance Alworth studied films of Hennigan. Hall of Fame tight end Jackie Smith, who also attended Northwestern State after Hennigan had graduated, said that Hennigan had helped Smith develop his pass catching skills when the two worked together at a boys football camp in Bryceland, Louisiana during the summers of 1962 to 1965. Hennigan and Oiler teammate Hogan Wharton had founded the camp in 1962.

In January 1970, the Pro Football Hall of Fame named Hennigan to the second team of the American Football League All-Time Team. Oilers fans voted Hennigan to be a member of the Oilers' 25^{th} anniversary All-Time Team. In 1978, he was named to the Louisiana Sports Hall of Fame. In 1973, he was inducted into Northwestern State's N-Club Hall of Fame. The Professional Football Researchers Association named Hennigan to the PFRA Hall of Very Good Class of 2014.

On January 19, 1962, Minden observed "Charlie Hennigan" Day. Then State Senator Harold Montgomery, State Representative, Parey Branton, Mayor Frank T. Norman, and other local officials presented Hennigan with a signed document of his accomplishments. A luncheon and evening meal were served in his honor. Also present were Minden resident Sharon Lee Brown, who had won the Miss USA pageant, and New York Yankees pitcher Ralph Terry. The event was postponed because of hazardous weather the previous week.

At the time of his death in 2017, Hennigan was one of only four receivers with four or more 200-yard receiving games in a career (Hennigan, Jerry Rice and Don Hutson with four and Lance Alworth with five such games). Hennigan was selected by his peers as a Sporting News AFL All-League offensive end in 1961, 1962, and 1964. He was an American Football League Eastern Division All-Star five straight years (1961 to 1965), and was a three-time first-team All-AFL selection by the Associated Press and United Press International.

=== Oilers/Titans Franchise records ===
Source: pro-football-reference.com's team encyclopedia

As of 2019's NFL off-season, Charley Hennigan held at least nine Titans franchise records, including:

- Most Receptions (season): 101 (1964)
- Most Receptions (game): 13 (1961-10-13 against Boston Patriots; tied with Sid Blanks (though Blanks has also been reported as having only 12), Haywood Jeffires, and Drew Bennett)
- Most Receiving Yds (season): 1,746 (1961)
- Most Receiving Yds (game): 272
- Most Receiving TDs (career): 51
- Most Rec Yds/Game (career): 71.8
- Most Rec Yds/Game (season): 124.7 (1961)
- Most 100+ yard receiving games (career): 28
- Most 100+ yard receiving games (season): 10 (1961)

== Career statistics ==
Year	Team	GP	Receiving					
Year	Team	GP	Rec	Yds	Avg	Lng	TD	Y/G
1960	HOU	11	44	722	16.4	73	6	65.6
1961	HOU	14	82	1,746	21.3	80	12	124.7
1962	HOU	14	54	867	16.1	78	8	61.9
1963	HOU	14	61	1,051	17.2	68	10	75.1
1964	HOU	14	101	1,546	15.3	53	8	110.4
1965	HOU	14	41	578	14.1	53	4	41.3
1966	HOU	14	27	313	11.6	23	3	22.4
Career		95	410	6,823	16.6	80	51	71.8

== Personal life and death ==
Hennigan received his bachelor's degree in 1958, and master's degree in 1961 from Northwestern State. In January 1967, he became the supervisor of elementary education in Louisiana. He was one of three people in the state who traveled across Louisiana working with teachers on how to teach children to read. In the spring of 1967, Hennigan received his doctorate in education from the University of Houston.

In 1975, Hennigan published a novel entitled "Slick", based on the life of a football player (roughly modeled on his own life). In the 1970s, Hennigan owned a 600-acre farm, and established a publishing company in Waco, Texas that produced guidance materials for children. He edited a phonetic reading program for junior high school students, and developed a "self-discovery and goal-setting course entitled 'Set Yourself Free'".

Hennigan established the Hennigan Institute in Houston, a learning center with counseling and educational programs for court-designated delinquent students. He operated an educational tutoring service in Shreveport and worked with prisoners seeking the General Equivalency Diploma (GED). Hennigan had seven children, the oldest being Charles Jr., who was born in Natchitoches in 1957.

For 1½ months in 1980, he was general manager of the Shreveport Steamer of the American Football Association. In late 1981 or early 1982, he was enrolled to attend Tulane Law School in New Orleans. In April 1982, he became head coach and general manager of the Shreveport Americans of the American Football Association, but was replaced at the end of May when he was in conflict with the 10-person ownership group over the degree of authority he had in making football decisions for the team.

On April 6, 2002, Hennigan, then a Democrat but a registered Independent as of 2014, ran in a special election for Place 8 on the Caddo Parish Commission, his parish's governing body. He was defeated by Republican Michael Long, 2,139 votes (74.9 percent) to 716 ballots (25.1 percent).

On December 20, 2017, Hennigan died at the age of 82.

== See also ==
- List of American Football League players
