= Mark Johnston (American football) =

American football player (born 1938)

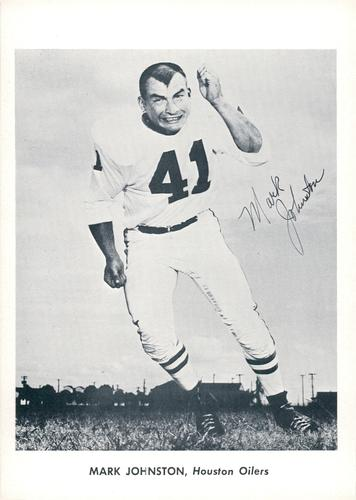

No. 41, 23
- Position: Cornerback

Personal information
- Born: March 4, 1938 (age 88); Sycamore, Illinois, U.S.
- Listed height: 6 ft 0 in (1.83 m)
- Listed weight: 203 lb (92 kg)

Career information
- College: Northwestern
- NFL draft: 1960: undrafted

Career history
- Houston Oilers (1960–1963); New York Jets (1964); Oakland Raiders (1964)

Awards and highlights
- 2× AFL champion (1960, 1961); AFL All-Star (1961)
- Stats at Pro Football Reference

Mark Johnston (born March 4, 1938) is an American former professional football player who was a cornerback for five seasons (1960–1964) in the American Football League (AFL) with the Houston Oilers, New York Jets, and the Oakland Raiders. He was an AFL All-Star in 1961, and was with the Oilers in the first three AFL Championship games, winning the title in 1960 and 1961.

A native of Sycamore, Illinois, he played college football for the Northwestern Wildcats from 1957 to 1959. In his final season in 1959, coach Ara Parseghian led the Wildcats to 6-0 record and were nationally ranked, defeating Oklahoma, Iowa, Minnesota, Michigan, Notre Dame and Indiana, before dropping their last three games to go 6–3.

Unclaimed in the 1960 NFL draft, Johnston went on to have 14 interceptions in his pro career.

He and the Oilers won the first AFL championship game on New Year's Day, 1961 over the San Diego Chargers, 24-16 before a crowd of 32,183 in Houston, Texas, led by quarterback George Blanda and flanker Billy Cannon, who hooked up on an 88-yard touchdown pass. Later that same year, on Christmas Eve, the same two teams met for the 1961 AFL championship before a crowd of 29,556 in San Diego, where the Oilers prevailed 10–3. That game's only touchdown came in the third quarter on a 35-yard pass from Blanda to Cannon.

Going for three championships in a row, the Oilers ended up losing to the Dallas Texans (who next year became the Kansas City Chiefs) in the longest title game in American pro football history. It took two overtime periods in Houston before the Texans came away with a 20–17 victory on a 25-yard field goal by Tommy Brooker.

Johnston then concluded his pro career with the New York Jets and Oakland Raiders in 1964.

== See also ==
- List of American Football League players
