= Charley Tolar =

American football player (1937–2003)

Charlie Tolar
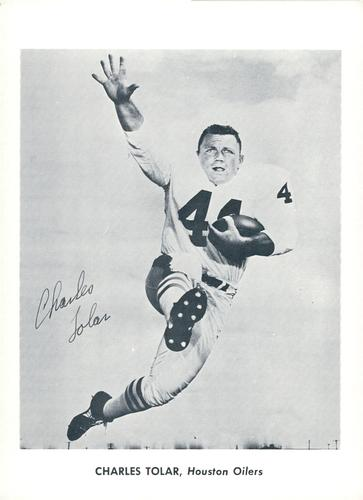

No. 44
- Position: Fullback

Personal information
- Born: September 5, 1937; Natchitoches, Louisiana, U.S.
- Died: April 28, 2003 (aged 65); Houston, Texas, U.S.
- Listed height: 5 ft 6 in (1.68 m)
- Listed weight: 200 lb (91 kg)

Career information
- High school: Natchitoches Central
- College: Northwestern St. (LA)
- NFL draft: 1959: 27th round, 319th overall pick

Career history
- Pittsburgh Steelers (1959)*; Houston Oilers (1960–1966)
- * Offseason or practice squad member only

Awards and highlights
- 2× AFL All-Star (1961, 1962); 2× AFL champion (1960, 1961)

Career AFL statistics
- Rushing yards: 3,277
- Rushing average: 3.6
- Receptions: 175
- Receiving yards: 1,266
- Total touchdowns: 23
- Stats at Pro Football Reference

Charles Guy Tolar (September 5, 1937 – April 28, 2003) was an early American Football League (AFL) star who played his entire career with the Houston Oilers at fullback. He was known as the "Human Bowling Ball" for his running style and stocky build at 5 ft 6 in (1.68 m). He was typically known as "Charlie" Tolar, rather than Charley, though he was called both Charlie and Charley in the local Louisiana press.

== Early life ==
Tolar was born on September 5, 1937, in the Isle Brevelle community near Natchitoches, Louisiana. He lettered in football, baseball, basketball and track at Natchitoches High School. As a running back on the football team, he was named All-District and All-North Louisiana three consecutive years; and was named All-State twice. As a senior in 1954, he led the state in scoring with 130 points and ran for a state-record 1,897 yards and 23 touchdowns.

== College career ==
Tolar originally signed to attend Louisiana State University, but then transferred to attend Northwestern State University of Louisiana in his hometown. At Northwestern, Tolar twice led the Gulf States Conference (GSC) in rushing and scoring, and was named twice as the conference's Most Valuable Player, including as a senior in 1958. He was also selected as a Little All-American in 1958.

He set the school records for most points in a season (79), most rushing touchdowns in a career (29), and highest career rushing average per game (75.7), that stood for over 40 years. He still holds four school records. In college, he was known by the nickname "Tank" or "Medium Tank".

He led Northwestern to GSC football championships in both 1957 and 1958. One of his teammates on the 1957 team was receiver Charley Hennigan, who also would become Tolar's teammate on the Houston Oilers for seven years. Tolar was also a member of the 1956 and 1957 Northwestern championship track teams. He ran the 100-yard dash in under 10 seconds, and could long jump over 23 feet.

== Professional career ==
Tolar was originally drafted by the Pittsburgh Steelers in the 27th round of the 1959 NFL draft, 319th overall. The Steelers released him before the start of the 1959 NFL season, but six months later he signed with the Houston Oilers in the first year of the American Football League's (AFL) existence. Oilers owner Bud Adams had seen Tolar play in a 1959 pre-season game between the Steelers and Chicago Bears in 1959 held in Houston, and Tolar made a lasting impression on Adams.

Tolar's height and weight have been variously listed as 5 ft 6 in, 220 lb., 5 ft 6 in, 199 lb., 5 ft 7 in, 198 lb., 5 ft 7 in, 210 lb., and 5 ft 6 in and "perhaps 210 pounds", among others. He became known as the "Human Bowling Ball" when an opposing AFL lineman said trying to tackle Tolar was like trying to tackle a bowling ball. The nickname has also been attributed to teammate Dalva Allen, who made the bowling ball comparison after scrimmaging against Tolar in practice. Another opponent described the experience as like trying to tackle a manhole cover. Houston owner Bud Adams said "The defensive players couldn't see him about half the time because he ran so low to the ground".

The Oilers were the AFL's first champions in 1960 and 1961. In 1960, on offense, they were led by former Heisman Trophy winner Billy Cannon and Dave Smith in the backfield, future Hall of Fame quarterback George Blanda, and receiver Charley Hennigan, who had been Tolar's teammate at Northwestern State University of Louisiana. Tolar was a reserve fullback behind Smith. He gained 179 yards on 54 carries, with three touchdowns.

In 1961, Tolar became the starting fullback ahead of Smith after Smith suffered a knee injury and never regained his form. Tolar rushed for 577 yards in 157 carries, with four rushing touchdowns. He also had 24 receptions for 219 yards and a receiving touchdown. He was named to the AFL All-Star game in 1961. He was named second-team All-AFL by the AFL and United Press International (UPI). Oilers coach Lou Rymkus considered Tolar his best all-around running back, running and blocking.

In 1962, Houston again reached the championship game, losing to the Dallas Texans (now the Kansas City Chiefs), 20–17. Tolar had scored a touchdown to tie the game in the fourth quarter, but Dallas won on a field goal in double-overtime (the second longest game in AFL/NFL history). 1962 was Tolar's best season. He led the AFL with 244 rushing attempts, and had a total of 1,012 yards rushing with seven rushing touchdowns, both third best in the AFL. He also caught 30 passes for 251 yards and a receiving touchdown. He was again selected to play in the AFL All-Star game and was named second-team All-AFL by the Associated Press (AP) and UPI. The Oilers named him the team's most valuable offensive back. He was the first AFL player to reach 1,000 yards rushing in a season.

Tolar led the Oilers in rushing in 1963 with 659 yards on 194 carries. He also had 41 receptions for 275 yards, but the Oilers fell to 6–8. In 1964, he had 515 yards on 139 carries, and was second in rushing on the Oilers to All-Star halfback Sid Blanks (756 yards). Tolar started 14 games a year every year from 1961 to 1964, but in 1965 he played in only 11 games, starting 10. He had only 73 carries for 230 yards, with the lowest rushing average (3.2 yards per carry) of his career to date.

New head coach Hugh Taylor believed Tolar was too small to rush effectively inside the opposing team's 20-yard line, and so used him less in 1965. As a team, the Oilers fell to 4–10 in 1964, and had the same record in 1965. In 1966 he started 10 games, but had only 46 carries for 105 yards (2.3 yards per carry). After suffering knee injuries, he retired before the 1967 season. He finished his career with 3,277 rushing yards and 175 catches.

After finishing his career, he worked as a scout for the Oilers for the next three years, but stopped because of the considerable travel required by the job.

== AFL career statistics ==
Legend
	Won the AFL championship
	Led the league
**Bold**	Career high

=== Regular season ===
Year	Team	Games		Rushing					Receiving				
Year	Team	GP	GS	Att	Yds	Avg	Lng	TD	Rec	Yds	Avg	Lng	TD
1960	HOU	14	0	54	179	3.3	**40**	3	7	71	**10.1**	23	0
1961	HOU	14	14	157	577	3.7	28	4	24	219	9.1	32	**1**
1962	HOU	14	14	**244**	**1,012**	**4.1**	25	**7**	30	251	8.4	35	**1**
1963	HOU	14	14	194	659	3.4	33	3	**41**	**275**	6.7	33	0
1964	HOU	14	14	139	515	3.7	**40**	4	35	244	7.0	**52**	0
1965	HOU	11	10	73	230	3.2	18	0	25	138	5.5	21	0
1966	HOU	14	10	46	105	2.3	17	0	13	68	5.2	14	0
Career		95	76	907	3,277	3.6	40	21	175	1,266	7.2	52	2

=== Playoffs ===
Year	Team	Games		Rushing					Receiving				
Year	Team	GP	GS	Att	Yds	Avg	Lng	TD	Rec	Yds	Avg	Lng	TD
1960	HOU	1	0	0	0	0.0	0	0	0	0	0.0	0	0
1961	HOU	1	1	16	52	3.3	**20**	0	**2**	2	1.0	**8**	0
1962	HOU	1	1	**17**	**58**	**3.4**	12	**1**	1	**8**	**8.0**	**8**	0
Career		3	2	33	110	3.3	20	1	3	10	3.3	8	0

== Legacy and honors ==
Tolar was named to the Oilers' 30th Anniversary Dream Team chosen by fans in 1989, and was among the top ten all-time rushers in the history of the AFL. In 1974, he was inducted into the Northwestern State University of Louisiana's N-Club Hall of Fame. In 1991, he was inducted into the Louisiana Sports Hall of Fame.

Tolar was a fan favorite in Houston during his seven years. He was also a favorite among his teammates. All-AFL guard, and Oiler teammate, Bob Talamini said "If you asked guys who played with him, I think most would tell you if they had to go to war, Charlie Tolar's the guy they'd want in their foxhole".

Of his running style, Talamini, who blocked for Tolar, said "The only thing Charlie didn't have was breakaway speed, but he'd run through a brick wall to get 1 yard." Sportswriter Wells Twombly observed that with Tolar's lack of speed and the difficulty for defenders in tacking him, he developed a distinctive running style: "'He simply folded himself up like an armadillo and churned straight ahead. Rarely did he get away for a long gain, but then, he was rarely thrown for a loss'". Tolar inspired Hall of Fame fullback Larry Csonka's running style.

In January 1963, the Natchitoches Athletic Club sponsored "Charley Tolar Day" in Natchitoches. This included a parade and early school closure so children could attend the parade, as well as a banquet with over 300 attendees. Tolar's teammate and former Heisman Trophy winner Billy Cannon was the main speaker at the banquet, which also included the mayor, the president of Northwestern State University of Louisiana, and his high school, college and professional coaches. Tolar also was honored by Governor Jimmy Davis, who commissioned Tolar a colonel.

== Personal life and death ==
Charles was born to Guy and Ola Lee Tolar, on the family farm on Cane River. At age 18 Tolar married Barbara Wesson, and to this marriage were born three daughters. Charlie Tolar was also an oil well fire-fighter. He worked for noted oil well fire-fighter Red Adair, who hired Tolar in 1962 to work with him around the world. After retirement, he lived in the Houston area, and operated a family farm near Natchez, Louisiana. He also worked as an assistant parks director, and owned an independent used car dealership in Pasadena, Texas.

Tolar died in Houston in 2003 following a bout with cancer, at age 65. At the time of his death, he was survived by his wife of 47 years, Barbara, and their three daughters, four grandchildren and one great-grandchild.
