= Bill Hull =

American football player (1940–2020)

No. 85
- Position: Defensive end

Personal information
- Born: August 4, 1940; Fayetteville, North Carolina, U.S.
- Died: May 3, 2020 (aged 79); Raleigh, North Carolina, U.S.
- Listed height: 6 ft 6 in (1.98 m)
- Listed weight: 245 lb (111 kg)

Career information
- High school: Tarboro (NC)
- College: Wake Forest
- NFL draft: 1962: 3rd round, 35th overall pick
- AFL draft: 1962: 5th round, 38th overall pick

Career history
- Dallas Texans (1962)

Awards and highlights
- AFL champion (1962); Second-team All-ACC (1961)

Career AFL statistics
- Sacks: 1.5
- Stats at Pro Football Reference

Harry William Hull Jr. (August 4, 1940 – May 3, 2020) was an American professional football defensive end who played in the American Football League (AFL) for the Dallas Texans in 1962.

== Career ==
Hull played college football at Wake Forest and was selected by the National Football League's Chicago Bears in the third round (35th overall) of the 1962 NFL draft and the AFL's Boston Patriots in the fifth round (38th overall) of the 1962 AFL draft but did not play for either team. He played only one season professionally with the AFL's Dallas Texans. He intercepted George Blanda late in the first overtime of professional football's longest championship game. In that 1962 American Football League Championship game against the Houston Oilers, Hull's interception allowed the Texans to start the second overtime with two runs by Jack Spikes to move the ball to the Oilers' 25-yard line, and Tommy Brooker kicked a field goal to give the Texans the win, 20 - 17.

== Basketball ==
Hull was also a collegiate basketball player, and became the first ACC player to ever to start for both the football and basketball team in the same season.

== Awards ==
In 1992, Hull was inducted into the Wake Forest Athletics Hall of fame.

== Death ==
He died on May 3, 2020, in Raleigh, North Carolina at age 79.

== See also ==
Wake Forest Hall of Fame honorees
