= Julian Spence =

American football player (1929–1990)

No. 24, 40
- Position: Defensive back

Personal information
- Born: May 25, 1929; Austin, Texas, U.S.
- Died: March 6, 1990 (aged 60); Harris County, Texas, U.S.
- Listed height: 5 ft 11 in (1.80 m)
- Listed weight: 170 lb (77 kg)

Career information
- High school: Anderson (Austin)
- College: Sam Houston State

Career history
- Chicago Cardinals (1956); San Francisco 49ers (1957); Houston Oilers (1960–1961)

Awards and highlights
- 2× AFL champion (1960, 1961)
- Stats at Pro Football Reference

Julian Carroll Spence (May 5, 1929 – March 6, 1990) was an American football defensive back who played two seasons with the Houston Oilers of the American Football League (AFL). He played college football at Sam Houston State University. He was also a member of the Chicago Cardinals and San Francisco 49ers of the National Football League (NFL).

== Early life ==
Spence attended L. C. Anderson High School in Austin, Texas.

== Professional career ==
Spence played in eight games for the Chicago Cardinals in 1956, and three games for San Francisco 49ers during the 1957. He then left football before returning to play for the American Football League Houston Oilers from 1960 to 1961, where he played on the championship team both years. In the 1961 AFL Championship Game against the San Diego Chargers, a late-game interception by Spence secured a 10-3 victory for the Oilers, earning the team their second AFL championship in as many years.

== Personal life ==
Spence served in the United States Army, earning the rank of first lieutenant. He died at his home in Harris County, Texas, on March 6, 1990, after an undisclosed illness.
