= Bill Groman =

American football player (1936–2020)

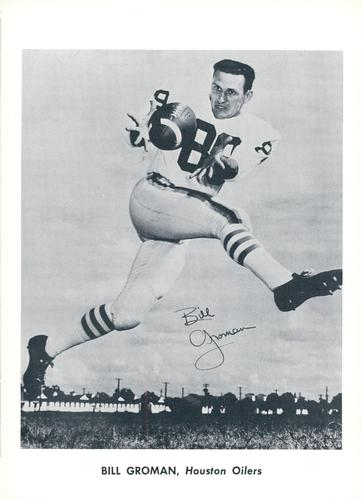

No. 89
- Position: Wide receiver

Personal information
- Born: July 17, 1936; Tiffin, Ohio, U.S.
- Died: June 17, 2020 (aged 83); Houston, Texas, U.S.
- Listed height: 6 ft 0 in (1.83 m)
- Listed weight: 194 lb (88 kg)

Career information
- High school: Tiffin (OH) Columbian
- College: Heidelberg
- NFL draft: 1960: undrafted

Career history
- Houston Oilers (1960–1962); Denver Broncos (1963); Buffalo Bills (1964–1965)

Awards and highlights
- 4× AFL champion (1960, 1961, 1964, 1965); First-team All-AFL (1960); AFL receiving yards leader (1960); AFL receiving touchdowns leader (1961)

Career NFL statistics
- Games: 66
- Receptions: 174
- Receiving yards: 3,481
- Receiving touchdowns: 36
- Stats at Pro Football Reference

William Frederick Groman (July 17, 1936 – June 17, 2020) was an American professional football player who was a wide receiver in the American Football League (AFL). He played college football for the Heidelberg Student Princes, and played professionally for the Houston Oilers from 1960 through 1962 and was on the first two AFL championship teams. He played for the Denver Broncos in 1963, and for the Buffalo Bills in 1964 and 1965, playing on the Bills' two league championship teams. In his six years of professional football, he played on four AFL championship teams, the only man ever to do so.

For 63 years, Groman held the National Football League (NFL) record for the most receiving yards in a season by a rookie, with 1,473 yards in the 1960 season. This record was broken on January 7, 2024, by Puka Nacua of the Los Angeles Rams in a game against the San Francisco 49ers. Nacua ended the season with 1,486 receiving yards, 13 more than Groman in 1960.

== Early life ==
Groman attended Heidelberg University and graduated with a bachelor's degree while lettering in three sports that included football. He did not have initial aspirations of being a pro player, instead moving on to teaching after leaving college in 1958. He taught science for eighth graders in Perrysburg, Ohio, near where he grew up before one day being approached to have lunch with a fellow teacher and her husband Bob Snyder, a former coach in the NFL. After a round of catch, he realized the talent in Groman and called up a former teammate of his at Notre Dame that happened to have been recently hired for the head role with the Houston Oilers in Lou Rymkus.

== Pro career ==
Groman started his career off with a bang, having a rookie year like no other receiver ever had before. In the first game he played (the first ever one for the Oilers as well), he caught six passes for 115 yards and one touchdown as the Oilers prevailed 37–22 over the Oakland Raiders. He played in 13 of the 14 games in the Oilers season, and he caught 72 passes for 1,473 yards with 12 touchdowns (including an additional one involving him throwing a pass for three yards for a score). In the AFL title game on January 1, 1961, he caught three passes for 37 yards and one touchdown, with his score in the third quarter giving the Oilers a 17–9 lead on the way to a 24–16 win over the Los Angeles Chargers. Groman set the record for receiving yards in a rookie season with 1,473 in 1960, when the season was 14 games long rather than the current 17; Groman played in only 13 of the Oilers 14 games. His 63-year-old record was broken by Puka Nacua on January 7, 2024. Groman was selected as one of the offensive ends on the first Sporting News AFL All-League Team in 1960. Alongside his teammate Charlie Hennigan, they were referred to as "The Long-Distance Twins", with Groman benefitting from his quick feet that made him a track star in college.

The following year, he played in 13 games and caught 50 passes for 1,175 yards (increasing his yards per catch from 20 to 23) and a league-high 17 touchdowns. In the AFL title game that season, he caught three passes for 32 yards. However, his career was cut short due to an injury sustained in that game. During a short catch, he was injured on a tackle by Claude Gibson that resulted in a bent knee from his own description after it collided with a helmet. Over the next four seasons, he would play with two torn knee ligaments, but he was never quite the same. This also proved his last playoff game appearance.

In 1962, he started in just six games and caught 21 passes for 328 yards for three touchdowns. He was traded to the Denver Broncos in 1963 and played in just five games for 27 catches, 437 yards, and three touchdowns. He moved to the Buffalo Bills for 1964 and 1965, where the team won two AFL titles, although Groman only caught a combined total of four catches for 68 yards in 10 total games for the Bills. In his six-year career, he had 3,481 receiving yards (2,008 in the five years after his rookie season), 36 touchdowns and 174 receptions. His 29 touchdowns in his first two seasons is the most by any receiver.

== After football ==
He retired after the 1966 season. He became a stockbroker after his career ended, but he did not leave football for very long, becoming a weekend scout for the Cincinnati Bengals and later other teams, including a stint as pro personnel director for two teams in the United States Football League. He spent the majority of his scouting time with the Atlanta Falcons, and he credited his recommendation of Jamal Anderson as one of his best ones. He retired from scouting in 2003 to take care of his ailing wife. Although he did not rack up enough stats to be considered for the Pro Football Hall of Fame, his shoes from the record-breaking rookie season are on display in bronze. He died on June 17, 2020, at the age of 83 of natural causes.

== AFL career statistics ==
Legend
	Won the AFL Championship
	Led the league
**Bold**	Career high

=== Regular season ===
Year	Team	Games		Receiving				
Year	Team	GP	GS	Rec	Yds	Avg	Lng	TD
1960	HOU	14	13	**72**	**1,473**	20.5	92	12
1961	HOU	14	13	50	1,175	**23.5**	80	**17**
1962	HOU	14	6	21	328	15.6	64	6
1963	DEN	14	5	27	437	16.2	74	3
1964	BUF	5	0	4	68	17.0	22	1
1965	BUF	5	0	Did not record any stats				
Career		66	37	174	3,481	20.0	92	36

== See also ==
- Other American Football League players
