= Phil Perlo =

American football player (1935–1993)

No. 56
- Position: Linebacker

Personal information
- Born: December 6, 1935; Washington, D.C., U.S.
- Died: December 11, 1993 (aged 58); Houston, Texas, U.S.
- Listed height: 6 ft 0 in (1.83 m)
- Listed weight: 220 lb (100 kg)

Career information
- High school: Theodore Roosevelt (Washington, D.C.)
- College: Maryland
- NFL draft: 1958: undrafted

Career history
- Washington Redskins (1958)*; Houston Oilers (1960)
- * Offseason or practice squad member only

Awards and highlights
- AFL champion (1960)
- Stats at Pro Football Reference

Phillip Donald Perlo (December 6, 1935 – December 11, 1993) was an American professional football linebacker who played one season with the Houston Oilers of the American Football League (AFL). He played college football at the University of Maryland, College Park.

== Early life and college ==
Phillip Donald Perlo was born on December 6, 1935, in Washington, D.C., son of Abraham Perlo and Eva Orleans Perlo. In his senior year at Theodore Roosevelt High School (Washington, D.C.) Perlo, as quarterback and linebacker, led his team to the city championship.

Perlo played college football for the Maryland Terrapins of the University of Maryland, College Park. He was a letterman in 1955 and 1957.

== Professional career ==
Perlo signed with the Washington Redskins of the National Football League (NFL) on April 14, 1958, after going undrafted in the 1958 NFL draft. However, he was later released.

Perlo signed with the Houston Oilers of the American Football League (AFL) in 1960. He played in seven games, starting one, for the Oilers during the team's inaugural 1960 season and posted one sack. On November 13, 1960, against the Los Angeles Chargers, Perlo suffered a career-ending neck injury after colliding with Howard Clark. On January 1, 1961, the Oilers beat the Chargers in the 1960 AFL Championship Game by a score of 24–16.

== Personal life ==
Perlo married Sue Gwen Ginsberg Perlo. He was inducted into the Greater Washington Jewish Sports Hall of Fame in 1992. He died on December 11, 1993 in Houston, Texas. He was buried in Washington, DC.
