= George Belotti =

American football player (1934–2009)

No. 65, 57
- Position: Center

Personal information
- Born: November 29, 1934; Los Angeles, California, U.S.
- Died: June 15, 2009 (aged 74); Arcadia, California, U.S.
- Listed height: 6 ft 4 in (1.93 m)
- Listed weight: 250 lb (113 kg)

Career information
- High school: Oxnard (Oxnard, California)
- College: USC
- NFL draft: 1957: 8th round, 87th overall pick

Career history
- Green Bay Packers (1957)*; Saskatchewan Roughriders (1958); Pittsburgh Steelers (1959)*; Houston Oilers (1960-1961); San Diego Chargers (1961); Boston Patriots (1962)*
- * Offseason or practice squad member only

Awards and highlights
- 2× AFL champion (1960, 1961)

Career AFL statistics
- Games played: 20
- Games started: 16
- Stats at Pro Football Reference

George D. Belotti (November 29, 1934 – June 15, 2009) was an American football offensive lineman. A center, he played college football at the University of Southern California, and played professionally in the American Football League (AFL) for the Houston Oilers in 1960 and 1961, and for the San Diego Chargers in 1961. He died of complications from a stroke.

== See also ==
- List of American Football League players
