= Orville Trask =

American football player (1934–2008)

No. 79
- Position: Defensive tackle

Personal information
- Born: December 3, 1934; Pueblo, Colorado, U.S.
- Died: November 12, 2008 (aged 73); Houston, Texas, U.S.
- Listed height: 6 ft 4 in (1.93 m)
- Listed weight: 260 lb (118 kg)

Career information
- High school: San Jacinto (Houston)
- College: Rice (1952, 1954–1955)
- NFL draft: 1956: 24th round, 282nd overall pick

Career history
- Houston Oilers (1960–1961); Oakland Raiders (1962)

Awards and highlights
- 2× AFL champion (1960, 1961)

Career AFL statistics
- Interceptions: 1
- Sacks: 3.5
- Stats at Pro Football Reference

Orville Luther Trask (December 3, 1934 – November 12, 2008) was an American professional football defensive tackle. He played college football at Rice University before playing for the Houston Oilers, where he won the 1960 and 1961 American Football League championships. He then played for the Oakland Raiders in 1962 before retiring following a shoulder injury.

== Personal life ==
Trask's grandson, Kyle Trask, was a quarterback for the Florida Gators in the late 2010s and was selected by the Tampa Bay Buccaneers in the second round, 64th overall, of the 2021 NFL draft.
