= Hogan Wharton =

American football player (1935–2008)

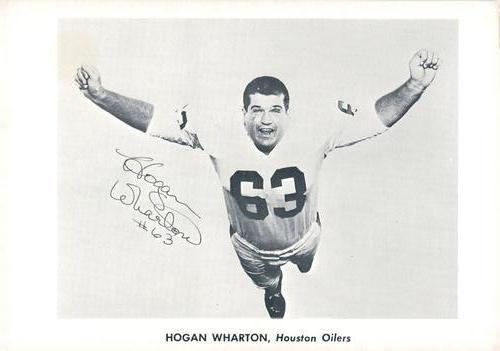

No. 63, 78
- Positions: Tackle, guard

Personal information
- Born: December 13, 1935; Hood County, Texas, U.S.
- Died: October 8, 2008 (aged 72); Sugar Land, Texas, U.S.
- Listed height: 6 ft 2 in (1.88 m)
- Listed weight: 250 lb (113 kg)

Career information
- High school: Orange (TX)
- College: Houston
- NFL draft: 1958: 11th round, 131st overall pick

Career history
- Houston Oilers (1960-1963)

Awards and highlights
- 2× AFL champion (1960, 1961); First-team All-American (1958)

Career AFL statistics
- Games played: 56
- Games started: 51
- Stats at Pro Football Reference

Robert Glen "Hogan" Wharton (December 13, 1935 – October 8, 2008) was an American football player. He attended the University of Houston where he played college football at the tackle position for the Houston Cougars football team from 1956 to 1958. He was named lineman of the year in the Missouri Valley Conference in 1957, and the following year he was selected by the American Football Coaches Association as a first-team tackle on its 1958 College Football All-America Team. Wharton later played professional football in the newly formed American Football League (AFL), playing at the guard position for the Houston Oilers during the first four years of the club's existence from 1960 to 1963, including the 1960 Houston Oilers team that won the first AFL championship. Wharton was also a professional wrestler during this time. He was cut by the Oilers in September 1964.
