= Mike Dukes =

American football player (1936–2008)

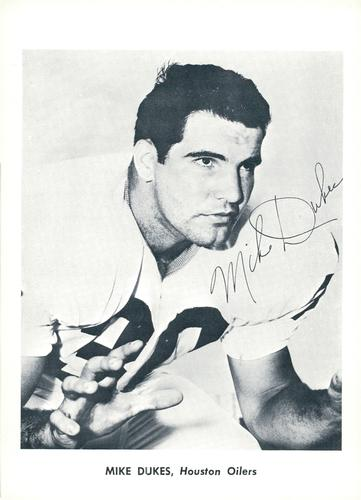

No. 30, 54, 55
- Position: Linebacker

Personal information
- Born: March 16, 1936; Louisville, Kentucky, U.S.
- Died: June 16, 2008 (aged 72); Beaumont, Texas, U.S.
- Listed height: 6 ft 3 in (1.91 m)
- Listed weight: 235 lb (107 kg)

Career information
- High school: Decatur (GA) Southwest DeKalb
- College: Clemson
- NFL draft: 1959: 14th round, 162nd overall pick

Career history
- San Francisco 49ers (1959); Houston Oilers (1960-1963); Boston Patriots (1964-1965); New York Jets (1965)

Awards and highlights
- 2× AFL champion (1960, 1961)

Career AFL statistics
- Interceptions: 8
- Sacks: 7
- Stats at Pro Football Reference

Michael Francis Dukes (March 16, 1936 – June 16, 2008) was an American collegiate and professional football player who was best known as a linebacker for the original Houston Oilers. Born in Louisville, Kentucky, Dukes attended Southwest DeKalb High School in Decatur, Georgia and then played in college for Clemson University. He played the 1959 season for the San Francisco 49ers of the National Football League (NFL). Dukes left the NFL for the upstart American Football League (AFL) where he played eleven seasons for the Oilers, Boston Patriots and New York Jets. He played for the first two championship teams of the American Football League, the 1960 and 1961 Oilers, and was selected to the UPI All-AFL Team in 1961.

Dukes died in an automobile accident on Interstate 10 in Beaumont, Texas on June 16, 2008, at age 72.

His interment was at Oak Bluff Memorial Park in Port Neches.

== See also ==
- List of American Football League players
