= Tommy Brooker =

American football player (1939–2019)

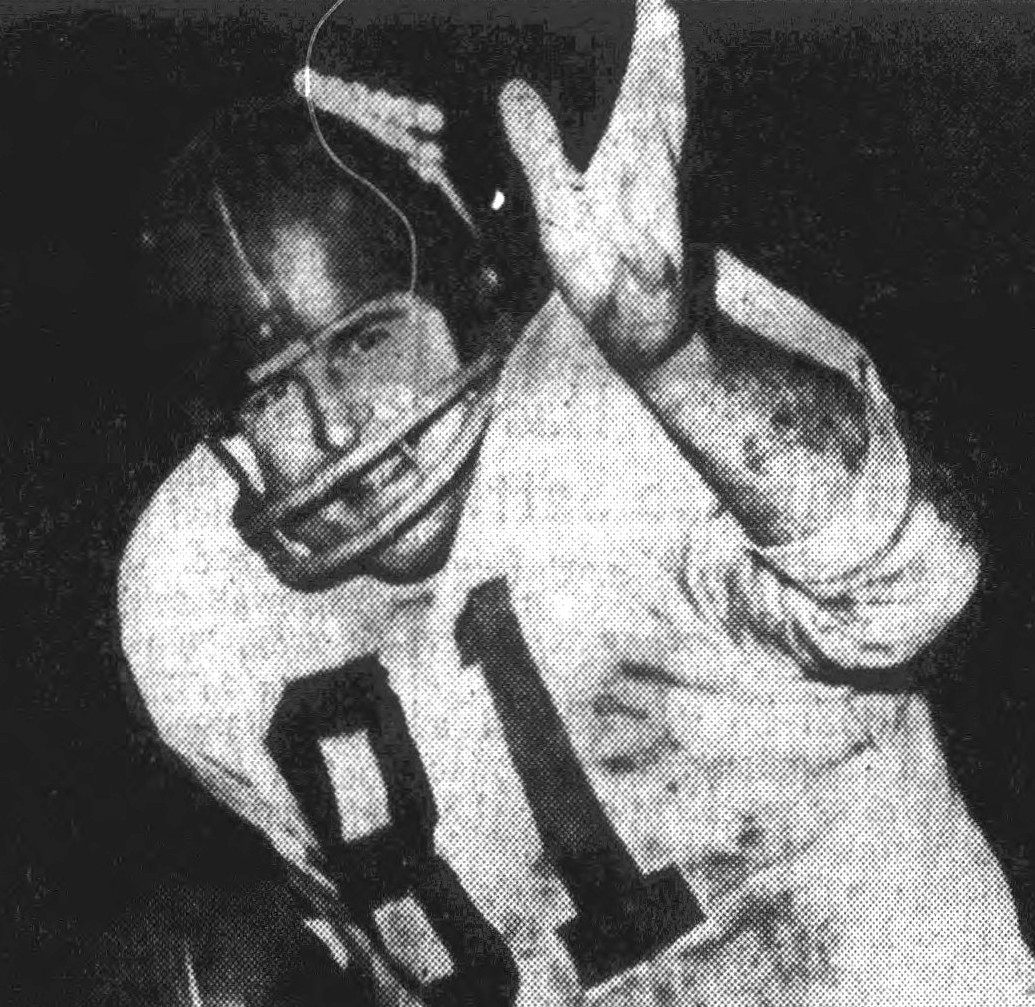
- Brooker in 1962

No. 81
- Positions: Placekicker, End

Personal information
- Born: October 31, 1939; Demopolis, Alabama, U.S.
- Died: September 21, 2019 (aged 79); Tuscaloosa, Alabama, U.S.
- Listed height: 6 ft 2 in (1.88 m)
- Listed weight: 235 lb (107 kg)

Career information
- High school: Demopolis (AL)
- College: Alabama
- NFL draft: 1962: 16th round, 211th overall pick
- AFL draft: 1962: 17th round, 131st overall pick

Career history
- Washington Redskins (1962)*; Dallas Texans/Kansas City Chiefs (1962–1966); Houston Oilers (1967)*
- * Offseason or practice squad member only

Awards and highlights
- AFL champion (1962); AFL All-Star (1964); National champion (1961)

Career AFL statistics
- Points: 290
- Field goals: 41
- Extra points: 149
- Stats at Pro Football Reference

Thomas William Brooker (October 31, 1939 – September 21, 2019) was an American professional football player who was a placekicker and end. He played for the Dallas Texans/Kansas City Chiefs of the American Football League (AFL) from 1962 to 1966. Brooker played college football at the University of Alabama under legendary coach Bear Bryant. He was drafted by the Texans in the 17th round (131st overall) in the 1962 AFL draft and by the Washington Redskins in the 16th round (211th overall) in the same year's NFL draft.

Doubling as an offensive end, Brooker had his best statistical season in his rookie year, 1962. He caught four passes, three for touchdowns, the only ones he would score during his career. He also made all 33 of his extra point attempts and kicked 12 of 22 field goals for a total of 87 points.

Brooker was a member of the Texans team that won the 1962 AFL Championship game, the Texans defeating the Houston Oilers (who had won the first two AFL title games, in 1960 and 1961) at Jeppesen Stadium. It would be the franchise's final game before their move from Dallas to Kansas City. Teammate Bill Hull intercepted the Oilers' George Blanda late in the first overtime of professional football's longest championship game. Hull's interception allowed the Texans to start the second overtime with two runs by Jack Spikes to move the ball to the Oilers' 25-yard line, and Brooker kicked a field goal to give the Texans the win, 20– 17. The field goal saved Texans star running back Abner Haynes from what could have been a costly error: at the start of the overtime, Haynes won the coin toss and stated that his team would "kick to the clock", which not only gave the Oilers first possession, but put the wind at their backs (the Oilers having gotten the choice of which end zone to defend). The Texans saved Haynes from embarrassment by preventing Houston from scoring in the first overtime; after the teams switched sides for the second overtime (double-overtime), Brooker kicked the winning field goal 2 minutes and 54 seconds in.

On September 8, 1963, in the Chiefs' inaugural game since moving from Dallas, Brooker converted eight extra points in a 59-7 victory over the Denver Broncos. This remains tied as a franchise single-game record, Mike Mercer and Lawrence Tynes equaling it in 1966 and 2004 respectively.

Brooker enjoyed two more solid seasons in 1964 and 1965. In the former, during which he would be named to the AFL All-Star Game, he made eight field goals and led the AFL with 46 extra points in as many attempts, for a total of 70 points. In 1965, he kicked a career-high 13 field goals and was a perfect 37-for-37 in PATs, for 76 points.

In his career Brooker scored 290 points: the three touchdowns in 1962, 41 field goals in 85 attempts, and a perfect 149-for-149 in PATs. To date, he holds the Dallas Texans/Kansas City Chiefs record for most career extra point attempts without a miss, and held the NFL record for most extra pointed attempted in a career without a miss until 2005, when Paul Edinger finished his career with 164 extra points without a miss.

== See also ==
- List of American Football League players
