= John Simerson =

American football player (1935–1992)

No. 53, 72, 64, 51, 75
- Positions: Center, tackle

Personal information
- Born: April 20, 1935; Honolulu, Hawaii, U.S.
- Died: August 2, 1992 (aged 57); Los Angeles, California, U.S.
- Listed height: 6 ft 3 in (1.91 m)
- Listed weight: 257 lb (117 kg)

Career information
- High school: Roosevelt (Honolulu)
- College: Purdue (1953–1956)
- NFL draft: 1957: 22nd round, 254th overall pick

Career history
- Philadelphia Eagles (1957–1958); Pittsburgh Steelers (1958); Winnipeg Blue Bombers (1959–1960)*; Houston Oilers (1960); Boston Patriots (1961)
- * Offseason or practice squad member only

Awards and highlights
- AFL champion (1960)

Career NFL/AFL statistics
- Games played: 43
- Games started: 18
- Stats at Pro Football Reference

John Cooke Simerson, Jr. (April 20, 1935 – August 2, 1992) was an American professional football center who played in the National Football League (NFL) and American Football League (AFL). He was selected by the Eagles in the 22nd round of the 1957 NFL draft after playing college football at Purdue University.

== Early life and college ==
John Cooke Simerson, Jr. was born on April 20, 1935, in Honolulu, Hawaii. He attended President Theodore Roosevelt High School in Honolulu.

Simerson played college football for the Purdue Boilermakers of Purdue University. He was on the freshman team in 1953 and a three-year letterman from 1954 to 1956.

== Professional career ==
Simerson was selected by the Philadelphia Eagles in the 22nd round, with the 254th overall pick, of the 1957 NFL draft. He started all 12 games for the Eagles as a rookie in 1957 as the team went 4–8. He played in four games for Philadelphia in 1958 before being released on October 21, 1958.

Simerson signed with the Pittsburgh Steelers on November 17, 1958. He appeared in three games, starting one, for the Steelers during the 1958 season. He was released on September 22, 1959, before the start of the 1959 season.

On October 2, 1959, it was reported that Simerson had signed with the Winnipeg Blue Bombers of the Canadian Football League. However, he was released on October 13, 1959, before playing in a game. He signed with the Blue Bombers again the next year on April 13, 1960. Simerson was released again on August 16, 1960.

Simerson was signed by the Houston Oilers of the American Football League (AFL) in 1960. He played in all 14 games, starting four, during the Oilers' inaugural 1960 season. He also started for the Oilers in the 1960 AFL Championship Game, a 24–16 victory over the Los Angeles Chargers.

In April 1961, Simerson was traded to the Boston Patriots for Jack Davis. Simerson appeared in ten games, starting one, for the Patriots in 1961. He was released on August 21, 1962.

== Personal life ==
Simerson died on August 2, 1992, in Los Angeles, California.
