= Southeastern Conference Player of the Year =

Southeastern Conference Player of the Year refers to the most outstanding player for the Southeastern Conference (SEC) in a given sport for a given season.

For lists of individual sport SEC Players of the Year by year:

- Southeastern Conference Baseball Player of the Year
- Southeastern Conference Softball Player of the Year
- Southeastern Conference Men's Basketball Player of the Year
- Southeastern Conference Women's Basketball Player of the Year

Additionally, SEC players of the year in football can be found at:

- Southeastern Conference football individual awards
