= 1960 American Football League Championship Game =

Coordinates: 29.722°N 95.349°W

1960 AFL Championship Game
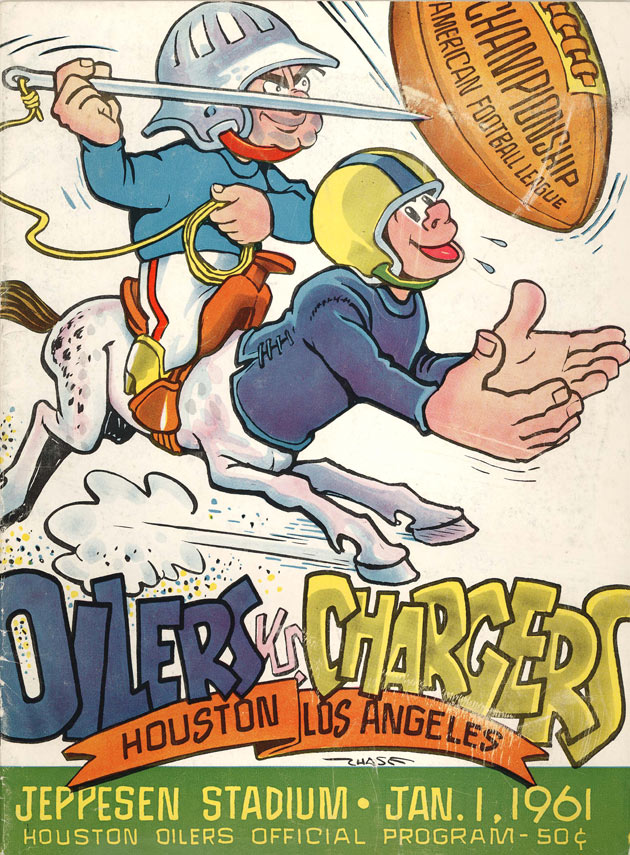
| Los Angeles Chargers (Western) (10–4) | Houston Oilers (Eastern) (10–4) |
|---|---|
| 16 | 24 |
| Head coach: Sid Gillman | Head coach: Lou Rymkus |
| | 1 | 2 | 3 | 4 | Total |
|---|---|---|---|---|---|
| LAC | 6 | 3 | 7 | 0 | 16 |
| HOU | 0 | 10 | 7 | 7 | 24 |
- Date: January 1, 1961
- Stadium: Jeppesen Stadium; Houston, Texas
- Referee: John McDonough
- Attendance: 32,183

TV in the United States
- Network: ABC
- Announcers: Jack Buck, George Ratterman, and Les Keiter

Location in the United States

The 1960 AFL Championship Game was the first American Football League title game, played on New Year's Day 1961 at Jeppesen Stadium in Houston, Texas. With New Year's on Sunday, the major college bowl games were played on Monday, January 2. This was the first time that a major professional football league's playoff game was played in January rather than December.

== Background ==
Due to the geography set up for the eight teams in the AFL, Houston was put in the Eastern Division with the Boston Patriots, the New York Titans, and the Buffalo Bills, while Los Angeles was paired with the Dallas Texans, Denver Broncos, and Oakland Raiders. Houston, as owned by Bud Adams, made the first big-name deal for a player when they signed Heisman Trophy winner Billy Cannon for a contract worth $33,000 a year for three years with a $10,000 signing bonus that held up despite a dispute from the Los Angeles Rams, who had signed him a few months prior. To quarterback the team would be George Blanda, who had retired from the Chicago Bears in 1958 at the age of 31 rather than play as only a placekicker. He would start 11 of the 14 games (while going 15-of-32 on field goals) while Jacky Lee started three games. Cannon rushed for 644 yards and five touchdowns that season for Houston. The Oilers won five of their first six games, which included a 38–28 victory over the Chargers in the second week. They lost the rematch 24–21 to fall to 6–3 on the season before winning four of their final five games of the year to finish three games above New York at 10–4 while being the best team in total offensive yards (4,936) on the strength of their passing, which saw over 3,000 yards.

Meanwhile, the Los Angeles Chargers were owned by Barron Hilton, who made his first big signing with Frank Leahy hired to be general manager of the team. Not long after, Hilton went through a variety of considerations, such as Bob McBride, a Notre Dame assistant who changed his mind within hours of announcement, to Lou Rymkus, the offensive line coach of the Los Angeles Rams before he elected to go with Houston before Sid Gillman was hired in early 1960. He had been fired by the Rams after being their head coach for the past five seasons, which included a loss in the 1955 NFL Championship Game. The coaching staff would be assembled in the winter of 1960 that included the likes of Al Davis and Chuck Noll. Control of management was ceded to Gillman when Leahy resigned in the summer due to health. Players acquired after the draft included Ron Mix, who traded for his rights from Boston and successfully wooed him away from signing with Baltimore and Jack Kemp, who went from backup quarterback on a handful of NFL teams to starting quarterback. Paul Lowe had been working in the mailroom for the Carte Blanche Corporation, owned by the Hilton family before a successful tryout got him on the team as a running back. The Chargers beat Dallas on opening day but struggled in the first six weeks with a split record, but they quickly got on a roll to win eight of their next nine games to win the Western Division by two games over Denver with a 10–4 record. Los Angeles ranked third in total offense (which saw Kemp throw for over 3,000 yards) for 379 total points, six less than Houston. They were also third in total defense, but they allowed an average of 24 points per game, narrowly more than Houston (20.4).

The AFL established a format in which the right to host Championship Games would be alternated each year between the Western Division winners and the Eastern Division. This matched the tradition the established National Football League had adhered to for decades. In the NFL, which the AFL was directly competing against, the Eastern champion hosted title games in even-numbered years. To preclude the possibility of having to compete with an NFL title game in close proximity for an audience, AFL owners initially agreed that its Western champions would host in even numbered years, with Eastern champions hosting in odd numbered years. Thus, the first game was originally scheduled to be played in the 103,000 capacity Los Angeles Coliseum. However, the Chargers had drawn less than 10,000 fans per home game. With the still-fledgling league fearing the prospect that ABC would pull its contract because of very poor ticket sales, the Chargers, the Oilers and the League mutually agreed to move the game to the smaller Jeppesen Stadium in Houston, where it drew a near-capacity 32,183. The game was the last the Chargers would play as a Los Angeles team until the 2017 season, with the team playing the next 56 years in San Diego. Ultimately, the league opted to reverse its initial format, as such the Chargers (who repeated as Western champions) would host the next championship game in San Diego. Ultimately, the AFL's initial fear of having to locally compete with an NFL title game host for an audience and gate revenue never realized, since although the New York Jets and Oakland Raiders later hosted AFL championship games during the league's ten-year run their local NFL rivals did not qualify for the postseason in any of those years.

== Game summary ==
It rained for five days straight prior to the game. The host Oilers were favored by 6-6½ points.

Oilers quarterback George Blanda threw three touchdown passes and kicked a field goal and three extra points to lead Houston to the AFL Championship by a score of 24–16.

The Chargers led 6–0 in the first quarter on two field goals by Ben Agajanian, one of only two players (Hardy Brown) who played in the AAFC, the NFL and the AFL. In the second period, Houston scored on a 17-yard George Blanda pass to All-AFL fullback Dave Smith, then answered a 27-yard Agajanian field goal with a 17-yard kick by Blanda.

In the final quarter, Heisman Trophy winner Billy Cannon caught a short toss from Blanda and went for an 88-yard touchdown scamper. The Chargers, down by eight points, tried to reach the end zone on their final possession. Had they scored they could have gone for the two-point conversion, but the clock ran out with the Chargers at the Oilers' 22-yard line. The Oilers won the first American Football League championship, 24–16.

=== Box score ===
Houston Oilers 24, Los Angeles Chargers 16

| Quarter | 1 | 2 | 3 | 4 | Total |
|---|---|---|---|---|---|
| Chargers | 6 | 3 | 7 | 0 | 16 |
| Oilers | 0 | 10 | 7 | 7 | 24 |

at Jeppesen Stadium, Houston, Texas

- Date: Sunday, January 1, 1961
- Game time: 2:30 p.m. CST
- Game weather: 45 °F (7 °C), wind 8 mph (13 km/h), relative humidity 82%
- Game attendance: 32,183
- Referee: John McDonough
- TV announcers (ABC): Jack Buck, George Ratterman, and Les Keiter
- Pro-Football-Reference.com

Game information

Scoring

- First quarter
  - LAC – Ben Agajanian 38-yard field goal. Chargers 3–0
  - LAC – Ben Agajanian 22-yard field goal. Chargers 6–0
- Second quarter
  - HOU – Dave Smith 17-yard pass from George Blanda (Blanda kick), Oilers 7–6
  - LAC – Ben Agajanian 27-yard field goal Chargers 9–7
  - HOU – George Blanda 17-yard field goal, Oilers 10–9
- Third quarter
  - HOU – Bill Groman 7-yard pass from George Blanda (George Blanda kick), Oilers 17–9
  - LAC – Paul Lowe 2-yard run (Ben Agajanian kick), Oilers 17–16
- Fourth quarter
  - HOU – Billy Cannon 88-yard pass from George Blanda (George Blanda kick), Oilers 24–16

Top passers

- LA – Jack Kemp – 21/41, 171 yards, 2 INT
- HOU – George Blanda – 16/31, 301 yards, 3 TD

Top rushers

- LA – Paul Lowe – 21 rushes, 165 yards, 1 TD
- HOU – Billy Cannon – 18 rushes, 50 yards

Top receivers

- LA – Dave Kocourek – 3 receptions, 57 yards
- HOU – Billy Cannon – 3 receptions, 128 yards, 1 TD

== Starting lineups ==
Hall of Fame inductee

| Los Angeles | Position | Houston |
|---|---|---|
Offense
| Jack Kemp | QB | George Blanda |
| Paul Lowe | HB | Billy Cannon |
| Howie Ferguson | FB | Dave Smith |
| Royce Womble | FL | Charley Hennigan |
| Don Norton | SE | Bill Groman |
| Dave Kocourek | TE | John Carson |
| Ernie Wright | LT | Al Jamison |
| Orlando Ferrante | LG | Bob Talamini |
| Don Rogers | C | George Belotti |
| Fred Cole | RG | Hogan Wharton |
| Ron Mix | RT | John Simerson |
Defense
| Maury Schleicher | LDE | Dalva Allen |
| Volney Peters | LDT | Orville Trask |
| Gary Finneran | RDT | George Shirkey |
| Ron Nery | RDE | Dan Lanphear |
| Ron Botchan | LLB | Al Witcher |
| Emil Karas | MLB | Dennit Morris |
| Rommie Loudd | RLB | Mike Dukes |
| Charlie McNeil | LCB | Jim Norton |
| Dick Harris | RCB | Mark Johnston |
| Jimmy Sears | SS | Bobby Gordon |
| Bob Zeman | FS | Julian Spence |

== Statistics ==
| Statistics | Chargers | Oilers |
|---|---|---|
| First Downs | 21 | 17 |
| Rushing yards | 190 | 100 |
| Yards per carry | 6.3 | 2.5 |
| Passing yards | 171 | 301 |
| Sack Yads Lost | 3–28 | 0–0 |
| Total yards | 333 | 401 |
| Fumbles-Lost | 2–0 | 0–0 |
| Turnovers | 2 | 0 |
| Penalties-Yards | 3–15 | 4–54 |

== See also ==
- 1960 AFL season
- AFL Championship Games
- 1960 NFL Championship Game

| Preceded by – | Houston Oilers; American Football League Champions; 1960 | Succeeded by Houston Oilers; 1961 AFL Champions |
