= American Football League playoffs =

For its first nine seasons, 1960 through 1968, the American Football League determined its champion via a single playoff game between the winners of its two divisions (although ties in the standings in 1963 (Eastern) and 1968 (Western) required a tiebreaker divisional playoff game the week before).

In 1969, the tenth and final year of the independent ten-team AFL, a four-team playoff was held, with the second-place teams in each division traveling to play the winner of the other division in what were called the "Interdivisional" playoffs. These playoffs were not, and are not considered to have been, "wildcard" playoffs since the runners-up in both divisions qualified, rather than the two best non-division winners. (Had the 1969 playoffs been true wildcard playoffs, the Western's third-place team, San Diego (8–6–0), would have qualified while the Eastern's runner-up, Houston (6–6–2), would not have.) The 1969 AFL playoffs were only the second time a U.S. major professional football league allowed teams other than the first-place teams (including ties) to compete in post-season playoffs. (The first was the seven-team All-America Football Conference's 1949 four-team playoff.)

Before the first Super Bowl, in the 1966 season, the AFL went to great lengths to avoid scheduling its playoff games at the same time as the NFL's. In 1960, the NFL's game was held on Monday, December 26; the AFL had that week off, and played its title contest on Sunday, January 1, as the college bowl games were played on Monday. In 1961 and 1962, the AFL played its championship game during the off-week between the end of the NFL's regular season and its title game (thus resulting in the AFL holding championship games on December 24, 1961, and December 23, 1962, a week before the NFL's games of December 31, 1961, and December 30, 1962). In 1963, the AFL held its Eastern Division tiebreaker playoff on Saturday, December 28, 1963, thereby avoiding the NFL championship game that Sunday (the AFL championship game was held on January 5). In 1964, pro football had a championship weekend, with the AFL's title game held on Saturday, December 26, and the NFL championship on Sunday. For 1965, the AFL tried to return to the practice of playing its game on a Sunday during the off-week between the NFL playoff, slating its championship contest for December 26, while the NFL's game was not held until January 2, 1966; the Colts and Packers required a Western Conference tiebreaker on December 26—and when that game went to overtime, it shrank the TV audience for the Bills–Chargers title game in San Diego. Even in 1966, the AFL originally scheduled its championship game for the off-week, planning to hold its playoff on Monday, December 26, six days before the NFL title game on January 1.

In 1966, the leagues agreed to hold championship doubleheaders for the next four years: both title games would take place on the same day but at different times so television audiences could watch both. These took place on January 1, 1967; December 31, 1967; December 29, 1968; and January 4, 1970.

The Pro Football Hall of Fame and the National Football League include AFL playoffs in their statistics for the NFL playoffs.

== Championship summary ==
Eastern Division	Western Division	Super Bowl Appearance	Super Bowl Victory

AFL Championship Games
Season	Date	Winning team	Score	Losing team	MVP	Venue	City	Attendance
1960	January 1, 1961	Houston Oilers	24–16	Los Angeles Chargers	Billy Cannon	Jeppesen Stadium	Houston, Texas	32,183
1961	December 24, 1961	Houston Oilers (2)	10–3	San Diego Chargers	Billy Cannon	Balboa Stadium	San Diego, California	29,556
1962	December 23, 1962	Dallas Texans	20–17 ^{(2OT)}	Houston Oilers	Jack Spikes	Jeppesen Stadium (2)	Houston, Texas (2)	37,981
1963	January 5, 1964	San Diego Chargers	51–10	Boston Patriots	Keith Lincoln	Balboa Stadium (2)	San Diego, California (2)	30,127
1964	December 26, 1964	Buffalo Bills	20–7	San Diego Chargers	Jack Kemp	War Memorial Stadium	Buffalo, New York	40,242
1965	December 26, 1965	Buffalo Bills (2)	23–0	San Diego Chargers	Jack Kemp	Balboa Stadium (3)	San Diego, California (3)	30,361
1966	January 1, 1967	Kansas City Chiefs (2)	31–7	Buffalo Bills	Len Dawson	War Memorial Stadium (2)	Buffalo, New York (2)	42,080
1967	December 31, 1967	Oakland Raiders	40–7	Houston Oilers	Daryle Lamonica	Oakland–Alameda County Coliseum	Oakland, California	53,330
1968	December 29, 1968	New York Jets	27–23	Oakland Raiders	Joe Namath	Shea Stadium	Flushing, New York	62,627
1969	January 4, 1970	Kansas City Chiefs (3)	17–7	Oakland Raiders	Otis Taylor	Oakland–Alameda County Coliseum (2)	Oakland, California (2)	53,564

- Eastern Division hosted in even-numbered seasons, Western in odd.

== 1960 Championship ==
Houston Oilers 24, Los Angeles Chargers 16

Quarter	1	2	3	4	Total
Chargers	6	3	7	0	16
Oilers	0	10	7	7	24

at Jeppesen Stadium, Houston, Texas

- Date: January 1, 1961
- Referee: John McDonough

Game information
- LA – Field goal Agajanian 38 LA 3-0
- LA – Field goal Agajanian 22 LA 6-0
- HOU – Smith 17 pass from Blanda (Blanda kick) HOU 7-6
- HOU – Field goal Blanda 18 HOU 10-6
- LA – Field goal Agajanian 27 HOU 10-9
- HOU – Groman 7 pass from Blanda (Blanda kick) HOU 17-9
- LA – Lowe 2 run (Agajanian kick) HOU 17-16
- HOU – Cannon 88 pass from Blanda (Blanda kick) HOU 24-16

== 1961 Championship ==
Houston Oilers 10, San Diego Chargers 3

Quarter	1	2	3	4	Total
Oilers	0	3	7	0	10
Chargers	0	0	0	3	3

at Balboa Stadium, San Diego, California

- Date: December 24, 1961

Game information
- HOU – Field goal Blanda 46
- HOU – Cannon 35 pass from Blanda (Blanda kick)
- SD – Field goal Blair 12

== 1962 Championship ==
Dallas Texans 20, Houston Oilers 17 (2OT)

Quarter	1	2	3	4	OT	2OT	Total
Texans	3	14	0	0	0	3	20
Oilers	0	0	7	10	0	0	17

at Jeppesen Stadium, Houston, Texas

- Date: December 23, 1962
- Referee: Harold Bourne

Game information
- DAL – Field goal Brooker 16
- DAL – Haynes 28 pass from Dawson (Brooker kick)
- DAL – Haynes 2 run (Brooker kick)
- HOU – Dewveall 15 pass from Blanda (Blanda kick)
- HOU – Field goal Blanda 31
- HOU – Tolar 1 run (Blanda kick)
- DAL – Field goal Brooker 25

== 1963 Playoffs ==
A tie in the Eastern Division standings necessitated an Eastern Division playoff game

=== Eastern Division Playoff ===
Boston Patriots 26, Buffalo Bills 8

Quarter	1	2	3	4	Total
Patriots	10	6	0	10	26
Bills	0	0	8	0	8

at War Memorial Stadium, Buffalo, New York

- Date: December 28, 1963

Game information
- BOS – Field goal Cappelletti 28
- BOS – Garron 59 pass from Parilli (Cappelletti kick)
- BOS – Field goal Cappelletti 12
- BOS – Field goal Cappelletti 33
- BUF – Dubenion 93 pass from Lamonica (Tracey pass from Lamonica)
- BOS – Garron 17 pass from Parilli (Cappelletti kick)
- BOS – Field goal Cappelletti 36

=== 1963 Championship ===
San Diego Chargers 51, Boston Patriots 10

Quarter	1	2	3	4	Total
Patriots	7	3	0	0	10
Chargers	21	10	7	13	51

at Balboa Stadium, San Diego, California

- Date: January 5, 1964

Game information
- SD – Rote 2 run (Blair kick)
- SD – Lincoln 67 run (Blair kick)
- BOS – Garron 7 run (Cappelletti kick)
- SD – Lowe 58 run (Blair kick)
- SD – Field goal Blair 11
- BOS – Field goal Cappelletti 15
- SD – Norton 14 pass from Rote (Blair kick)
- SD – Alworth 48 pass from Rote (Blair kick)
- SD – Lincoln 25 pass from Hadl (Pass failed)
- SD – Hadl 1 run (Blair kick)

The Chargers championship win is noted for being the only and most recent major sports championship won for the city of San Diego. No other city with at least two major professional sports teams has a championship drought as long, as of 2024 (61 years). This is also the only time that the Chargers have beaten the Patriots in a postseason game.

== 1964 Championship ==
Buffalo Bills 20, San Diego Chargers 7

Quarter	1	2	3	4	Total
Chargers	7	0	0	0	7
Bills	3	10	0	7	20

at War Memorial Stadium, Buffalo, New York

- Date: December 26, 1964

Game information
- SD – Kocourek 26 pass from Rote (Lincoln kick)
- BUF – Field goal Gogolak 12
- BUF – Carlton 4 run (Gogolak kick)
- BUF – Field goal Gogolak 17
- BUF – Kemp 1 run (Gogolak kick)

Mike Stratton's hit on San Diego Chargers running back Keith Lincoln set the stage for the Buffalo Bills and their first AFL championship.

== 1965 Championship ==
Buffalo Bills 23, San Diego Chargers 0

Quarter	1	2	3	4	Total
Bills	0	14	6	3	23
Chargers	0	0	0	0	0

at Balboa Stadium, San Diego, California

- Date: December 26, 1965

Game information
- BUF – Warlick 18 pass from Kemp (Gogolak kick)
- BUF – Byrd 74 punt return (Gogolak kick)
- BUF – Field goal Gogolak 11
- BUF – Field goal Gogolak 39
- BUF – Field goal Gogolak 32

This was the last AFL Championship Game before the Super Bowl era began the following season and the last time a final pro football championship game was played in December. It was also the most recent championship won by a Buffalo-based major professional sports team.

== 1966 Championship ==
Kansas City Chiefs 31, Buffalo Bills 7

Quarter	1	2	3	4	Total
Chiefs	7	10	0	14	31
Bills	7	0	0	0	7

at War Memorial Stadium, Buffalo, New York

- Date: January 1, 1967

Game information
- KC – Arbanas 29 pass from Dawson (Mercer kick)
- BUF – Dubenion 69 pass from Kemp (Lusteg kick)
- KC – Taylor 29 pass from Dawson (Mercer kick)
- KC – Field goal Mercer 32
- KC – Garrett 1 run (Mercer kick)
- KC – Garrett 18 run (Mercer kick)

Kansas City lost Super Bowl I to the NFL champion Green Bay Packers.

== 1967 Championship ==
Oakland Raiders 40, Houston Oilers 7

Quarter	1	2	3	4	Total
Oilers	0	0	0	7	7
Raiders	3	14	10	13	40

at Oakland–Alameda County Coliseum, Oakland, California

- Date: December 31, 1967
- Referee: John McDonough

Game information
- OAK – Field goal Blanda 37
- OAK – Dixon 69 run (Blanda kick)
- OAK – Kocourek 17 pass from Lamonica (Blanda kick)
- OAK – Lamonica 1 run (Blanda kick)
- OAK – Field goal Blanda 40
- OAK – Field goal Blanda 42
- HOU – Frazier 5 pass from Beathard (Wittenborn kick)
- OAK – Field goal Blanda 36
- OAK – Miller 12 pass from Lamonica (Blanda kick)

Oakland lost Super Bowl II to the NFL champion Green Bay Packers.

== 1968 Playoffs ==
A tie in the Western Division standings necessitated a Western Division playoff game

=== Western Division Playoff ===
Oakland Raiders 41, Kansas City Chiefs 6

Quarter	1	2	3	4	Total
Chiefs	0	6	0	0	6
Raiders	21	7	0	13	41

at Oakland–Alameda County Coliseum, Oakland, California

- Date: December 22, 1968
- Referee: Ben Dreith

Game information
- OAK – Biletnikoff 24 pass from Lamonica (Blanda kick)
- OAK – Wells 23 pass from Lamonica (Blanda kick)
- OAK – Biletnikoff 44 pass from Lamonica (Blanda kick)
- KC – Field goal Stenerud 10
- KC – Field goal Stenerud 8
- OAK – Biletnikoff 54 pass from Lamonica (Blanda kick)
- OAK – Wells 35 pass from Lamonica (Blanda kick)
- OAK – Field goal Blanda 41
- OAK – Field goal Blanda 40

=== 1968 Championship ===
New York Jets 27, Oakland Raiders 23

Quarter	1	2	3	4	Total
Raiders	0	10	3	10	23
Jets	10	3	7	7	27

at Shea Stadium, New York City

- Date: December 29, 1968
- Referee: Walt Fitzgerald

Game information
- NY – Maynard 14 pass from Namath (Turner kick)
- NY – Field goal Turner 33
- OAK – Biletnikoff 29 pass from Lamonica (Blanda kick)
- NY – Field goal Turner 36
- OAK – Field goal Blanda 26
- OAK – Field goal Blanda 9
- NY – Lammons 20 pass from Namath (Turner kick)
- OAK – Field goal Blanda 20
- OAK – Banaszak 4 run (Blanda kick)
- NY – Maynard 6 pass from Namath (Turner kick)

The Jets went on to win Super Bowl III to become the first AFL Super Bowl champion.

== 1969 Playoffs ==
=== Bracket ===
Interdivisional Playoffs
W2	Kansas City Chiefs	13
E1	New York Jets	6
E2	Houston Oilers	7
W1	Oakland Raiders	56

AFL Championship Game
W2	Kansas City Chiefs	17
W1	Oakland Raiders	7

=== Interdivisional Playoffs ===
Kansas City Chiefs 13, New York Jets 6

Quarter	1	2	3	4	Total
Chiefs	0	3	3	7	13
Jets	3	0	0	3	6

at Shea Stadium, New York City

- Date: December 20, 1969
- Referee: Jack Reader

Game information
- NY – Field goal Turner 27
- KC – Field goal Stenerud 23
- KC – Field goal Stenerud 25
- NY – Field goal Turner 7
- KC – Richardson 19 pass from Dawson (Stenerud kick)

Oakland Raiders 56, Houston Oilers 7

Quarter	1	2	3	4	Total
Oilers	0	0	0	7	7
Raiders	28	7	14	7	56

at Oakland–Alameda County Coliseum, Oakland, California

- Date: December 21, 1969
- Referee: Ben Dreith

Game information
- OAK – Biletnikoff 13 pass from Lamonica (Blanda kick)
- OAK – Atkinson 57 interception return (Blanda kick)
- OAK – Sherman 24 pass from Lamonica (Blanda kick)
- OAK – Biletnikoff 31 pass from Lamonica (Blanda kick)
- OAK – Smith 60 pass from Lamonica (Blanda kick)
- OAK – Sherman 23 pass from Lamonica (Blanda kick)
- OAK – Cannon 3 pass from Lamonica (Blanda kick)
- HOU – Reed 8 pass from Beathard (Gerela kick)
- OAK – Hubbard 4 run (Blanda kick)

=== 1969 Championship ===
Kansas City Chiefs 17, Oakland Raiders 7

Quarter	1	2	3	4	Total
Chiefs	0	7	7	3	17
Raiders	7	0	0	0	7

at Oakland–Alameda County Coliseum, Oakland, California

- Date: January 4, 1970
- Referee: Jack Vest

Game information
- OAK – Smith 3 run (Blanda kick)
- KC – Hayes 1 run (Stenerud kick)
- KC – Holmes 5 run (Stenerud kick)
- KC – Field goal Stenerud 22

This was the final AFL Championship Game, as well as the final game played between two AFL teams before the merger with the National Football League. The Chiefs won Super Bowl IV as the last AFL champion.

== Championship Game MVPs ==
Key for the below tables
Symbol	Description
Year	Each year is linked to an article about that particular AFL season
Winner (#)	Denotes number of times the player won the award
*	Player elected to the Pro Football Hall of Fame
Team (#)	Denotes number of times the team won the award
Position (#)	Denotes number of times the position has the award

AFL Championship Game Most Valuable Players
Year	Game	Winner	Team	Position	College
1960	1960	Billy Cannon	Houston Oilers	HB	LSU
1961	1961	Billy Cannon (2)	Houston Oilers (2)	HB (2)	LSU
1962	1962	Jack Spikes	Dallas Texans	HB (3)	TCU
1963	1963	Keith Lincoln	San Diego Chargers	HB (4)	Washington State
1964	1964	Jack Kemp	Buffalo Bills	QB	Occidental
1965	1965	Jack Kemp (2)	Buffalo Bills (2)	QB (2)	Occidental
1966	1966	Len Dawson	Kansas City Chiefs (2)	QB (3)	Purdue
1967	1967	Daryle Lamonica	Oakland Raiders	QB (4)	Notre Dame
1968	1968	Joe Namath	New York Jets	QB (5)	Alabama
1969	1969	Otis Taylor	Kansas City Chiefs (3)	WR	Prairie View A&M

== AFL Championship Game appearances 1960–1969 ==
Num	Team	W	L	Pct
5	Los Angeles/San Diego Chargers	1	4	.200
4	Houston Oilers	2	2	.500
3	Dallas Texans/Kansas City Chiefs	3	0	1.000
3	Buffalo Bills	2	1	.667
3	Oakland Raiders	1	2	.333
1	New York Jets	1	0	1.000
1	Boston Patriots	0	1	.000

== See also ==
- AFC Championship Game
