= George Blanda =

American football player (1927–2010)

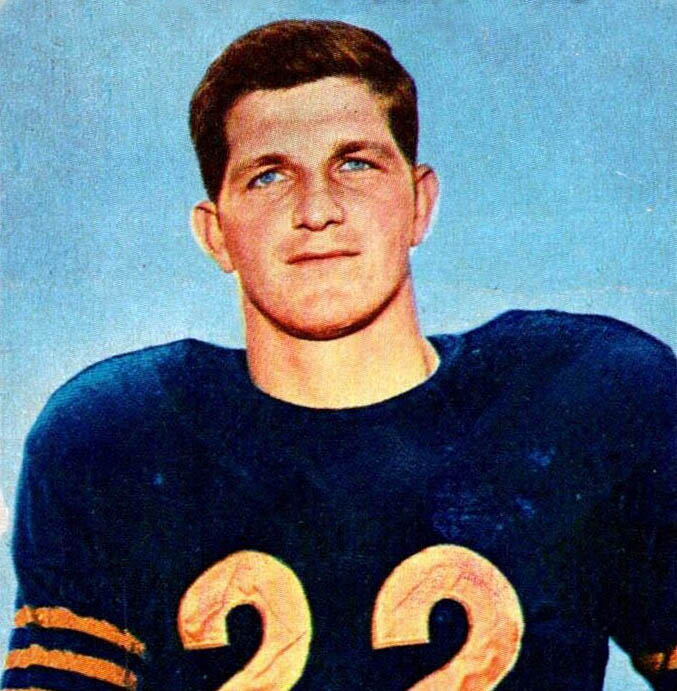
- Blanda depicted on a 1954 Bowman football card

No. 22, 64, 16
- Positions: Quarterback, placekicker

Personal information
- Born: September 17, 1927; Youngwood, Pennsylvania, U.S.
- Died: September 27, 2010 (aged 83); Alameda, California, U.S.
- Listed height: 6 ft 2 in (1.88 m)
- Listed weight: 215 lb (98 kg)

Career information
- High school: Youngwood
- College: Kentucky (1945–1948)
- NFL draft: 1949: 12th round, 119th overall pick

Career history
- Chicago Bears (1949); Baltimore Colts (1950); Chicago Bears (1950–1958); Houston Oilers (1960–1966); Oakland Raiders (1967–1975)

Awards and highlights
- 3× AFL champion (1960, 1961, 1967); AFL Most Valuable Player (1961); NFL Man of the Year (1974); First-team All-AFL (1961); 2× Second-team All-AFL (1962, 1963); 4× AFL All-Star (1961–1963, 1967); 2× AFL passing yards leader (1961, 1963); AFL passing touchdowns leader (1961); AFL passer rating leader (1961); AFL scoring leader (1967); AFL All-Time Team; AP Male Athlete of the Year (1970); Bert Bell Award (1970); UPI AFC Player of the Year (1970); 100 greatest Bears of All-Time; Titans/Oilers Ring of Honor; NFL records: Most seasons played: 26; Most career extra points made: 943; Most passing touchdowns in a game: 7 (tied); Most interceptions thrown, single season: 42 (1962)

Career NFL/AFL statistics
- Passing completions / attempts: 1,911 / 4,007
- Completion percentage: 47.7%
- TD–INT: 236–277
- Passing yards: 26,920
- Passer rating: 60.6
- Field goals made / attempted: 335 / 641
- Field goal percentage: 52.3%
- Extra points made / attempted: 943 / 959
- Extra point percentage: 98.3%
- Points scored: 2,002
- Stats at Pro Football Reference
- Pro Football Hall of Fame

George Frederick Blanda (September 17, 1927 – September 27, 2010) was an American professional football player who was a quarterback and placekicker in the American Football League (AFL) and National Football League (NFL). Blanda played 26 seasons of professional football, the most in the sport's history, and had scored more points than anyone in history at the time of his retirement.

Blanda retired from professional football in August 1976 as the sport's oldest player at the age of 48, a mark that still stands. One of only three players to play in four different decades (the other two being John Carney and Jeff Feagles), he holds the record for most extra points made (943) and attempted (959).

== College career ==
Blanda was a quarterback and kicker at Kentucky from 1945 to 1948. Coach Paul "Bear" Bryant, who later won fame and set countless records at Southeastern Conference rival Alabama, arrived in his sophomore year, following a 1–9 season in 1945. The Wildcats lost only three games in each of the next three years.

Blanda was the starting quarterback his last two seasons at Kentucky (1947–1948), compiling 120 completions in 242 passes (49.6 percent completions), 1,451 yards and 12 touchdowns.

== Professional career ==
=== Chicago Bears ===
Blanda was signed by the Chicago Bears for $600 in 1949, an amount owner George Halas demanded back when he made the team. Blanda was given a lucrative contract of $6000, as the $600 was just a sign on bonus. While primarily used as a quarterback and placekicker, Blanda also saw time on the defensive side of the ball at linebacker. It was not until 1953 that Blanda emerged as the Bears' top quarterback, but an injury the following year effectively ended his first-string status. For the next four years, he was used mostly in a kicking capacity. Later commenting on his testy relationship with Halas, Blanda noted, "he was too cheap to even buy me a kicking shoe." Blanda later reflected that by the 1950s the professional game had moved beyond Halas, who seemed to lack the interest he had earlier.

=== Houston Oilers ===
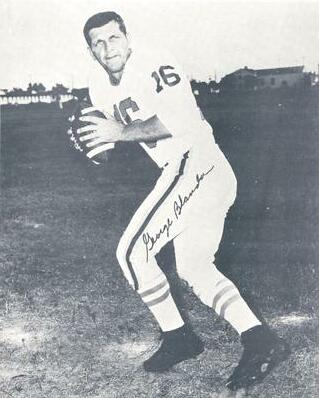
Blanda with the Oilers in 1961

Blanda retired after the 1958 season because of Halas' insistence on only using him as a kicker, but returned in 1960 upon the formation of the American Football League. He signed with the Houston Oilers as both a quarterback and kicker. He was derided by the sports media as an "NFL Reject", but he went on to lead the Oilers to the first two league titles in AFL history, and he was the All-AFL quarterback and won AFL Player of the Year honors in 1961. During that season, he led the AFL in passing yards (3,330) and touchdown passes (36). His 36 touchdown passes in 1961 were the most ever thrown by any NFL/AFL quarterback in a single season, until matched by Y. A. Tittle of the NFL's New York Giants two years later in 1963. Blanda's and Tittle's mark remained the record until surpassed by Dan Marino's 48 touchdown passes in 1984. In the 1961 title game, he threw five interceptions, becoming the fourth quarterback in football history to do so in a playoff game. However, the Oilers won 10–3 on the strength of a tough defense that held the San Diego Chargers to no points until late in the fourth quarter, and Blanda made a field goal and threw a touchdown pass to Billy Cannon in the win. Of all players to throw five interceptions or more in a playoff game, Blanda is the only one who did not lose the game.

During 1962, he had two 400-yard passing days for the Oilers: a 464-yard effort against the Buffalo Bills on October 29, with four touchdown passes (winning 28–16); and 418 yards three weeks later against the Titans of New York, this time with seven touchdown passes in a 49–13 victory. Blanda passed for 36 touchdowns that season. Blanda threw 42 interceptions that season, a record that still stands as the only quarterback to throw 40 interceptions in a season. In the 1962 title game that went to double overtime, he kicked a field goal and threw for a touchdown pass but had his fifth interception occur late to eventually set up the game-ending field goal. On thirteen occasions, he connected on four or more touchdown passes during a game, and on November 1, 1964, unleashed 68 passes for Houston against the eventual champion Buffalo Bills.

From 1963 to 1965, Blanda led the AFL in passing attempts and completions, and ranked in the top ten for attempts, completions, yards and touchdowns during seven consecutive seasons. The 1966 season would see Blanda's Oilers begin the season with a 3–5 record despite a statistically prolific connection with receiver Charley Frazier. Blanda would cede playing time at quarterback to the 25-year-old Don Trull, though Blanda continued to serve as the team's primary kicker. A four-time AFL All-Star, Blanda's already-long career seemed over when he was released by the Oilers on March 18, 1967. However, the Oakland Raiders signed him that July, seeing his potential as a contributing backup passer and a dependable kicker.

In later years, Blanda remained a strong supporter of AFL heritage, saying: "That first year, the Houston Oilers or Los Angeles Chargers (24–16 losers to the Oilers in the title game) could have beaten the NFL champion (Philadelphia) in a Super Bowl." Blanda said further: "I think the AFL was capable of beating the NFL in a Super Bowl game as far back as 1960 or '61. I just regret we didn't get the chance to prove it."

=== Oakland Raiders ===
In 1967, Blanda's first season with the Raiders, his kicking skills helped him lead the AFL in scoring with 116 points. In two instances, his leg helped play a role in Raider victories: a trio of field goals helped upset the defending league champion Kansas City Chiefs on October 1; in the closing weeks of the regular season, Blanda booted four field goals behind a hostile Houston crowd in a 19–7 victory over his former team, the Oilers, helping gain a measure of revenge. Three weeks later, the Raiders met the Oilers again in the AFL Championship Game and won 40–7.

The Raiders went on to compete in Super Bowl II, but lost the game to the Green Bay Packers.

In 1970, Blanda was released during the exhibition season, but bounced back to establish his 21st professional season. During that season, Blanda, at age 43, had a remarkable five-game run. Against the Steelers, Blanda threw for three touchdowns in relief of an injured Daryle Lamonica. One week later, his 48-yard field goal with three seconds remaining salvaged a 17–17 tie with the Kansas City Chiefs. On November 8, he again came off the bench to throw a touchdown pass to tie the Cleveland Browns with 1:34 remaining, then kicked a 53-yard field goal with 0:03 left for the 23–20 win. Immediately after the winning field goal, Raiders radio announcer Bill King excitedly declared, "George Blanda has just been elected King of the World!" In the team's next game, Blanda replaced Lamonica in the fourth quarter and connected with Fred Biletnikoff on a touchdown pass with 2:28 left in the game to defeat the Denver Broncos, 24–19. The following week, Blanda's 16-yard field goal in the closing seconds defeated the San Diego Chargers, 20–17.

In the AFC title game against the Baltimore Colts, Blanda again relieved an injured Lamonica, completing 17 of 32 passes for 217 yards and two touchdowns while also kicking a 48-yard field goal and two extra points, keeping the Raiders in the game until the final quarter, when he was intercepted twice. Aged 43, he became the oldest quarterback ever to play in a championship game, and was one of the few remaining straight-ahead kickers in the NFL.

Blanda's achievements resulted in his winning the Bert Bell Award. Chiefs' owner Lamar Hunt said, "Why, this George Blanda is as good as his father, who used to play for Houston." Although he never again played a major role at quarterback, Blanda served as the Raiders' kicker for five more seasons. Blanda was also named the Associated Press Male Athlete of the Year, being the first professional football player to earn the award. He finished 2nd in the Associated Press MVP voting to John Brodie.

He played in his last game at Pittsburgh's Three Rivers Stadium on January 4, 1976, at age 48, in the 1975 AFC Championship Game, in which he kicked a 41-yard field goal and made one extra point as the Raiders lost to the Steelers 16–10. Blanda was released during training camp in late August 1976 and succeeded at kicker by rookie Fred Steinfort. Blanda never played football again, but he harbored no ill feelings when the Raiders went on to win the NFL title that year in Super Bowl XI (incidentally, Steinfort was injured in mid-season and was replaced by 35-year-old veteran Errol Mann).

== NFL/AFL career statistics ==
Legend
	AFL MVP
	Won the AFL championship
	NFL record
	Led the league
**Bold**	Career high
Underline	Incomplete data

=== Regular season ===
Year	Team	Games			Passing									Kicking							
Year	Team	GP	GS	Record	Cmp	Att	Pct	Yds	Y/A	Lng	TD	Int	Rtg	FGM	FGA	Lng	FG%	XPM	XPA	XP%	Pts
1949	CHI	12	2	—	9	21	42.9	197	9.4	44	0	5	37.3	7	15	—	46.7	0	0	—	21
1950	BAL	1	0	—	0	0	—	0	—	0	0	0	—	0	0	0	—	0	0	—	0
1950	CHI	11	0	—	0	1	0.0	0	0.0	0	0	0	39.6	6	15	—	40.0	0	0	—	18
1951	CHI	12	0	—	0	0	0.0	0	0.0	0	0	0	0.0	6	17	—	35.3	26	26	**100.0**	44
1952	CHI	12	2	1−1	47	131	35.9	664	5.1	59	8	11	38.5	6	25	—	24.0	30	30	**100.0**	48
1953	CHI	12	12	3−8−1	169	362	46.7	2,164	6.0	72	14	23	52.3	7	20	—	35.0	27	27	**100.0**	48
1954	CHI	8	7	4−3	131	281	46.6	1,929	6.9	76	15	17	62.1	8	16	—	50.0	23	23	**100.0**	47
1955	CHI	12	0	—	42	97	43.3	459	4.7	51	4	7	41.6	11	16	—	68.8	37	37	**100.0**	70
1956	CHI	12	0	—	37	69	53.6	439	6.4	69	7	4	82.9	12	28	—	42.9	45	47	95.7	81
1957	CHI	12	0	—	8	19	42.1	65	3.4	13	1	3	11.8	14	26	—	53.8	23	23	**100.0**	65
1958	CHI	12	0	—	2	7	28.6	19	2.7	12	0	0	39.6	11	23	—	47.8	36	37	97.3	69
1960	HOU	14	11	8−3	169	363	46.6	2,413	6.6	88	24	22	65.4	15	32	53	45.5	46	47	97.9	91
1961	HOU	14	11	9−2	187	362	51.7	**3,330**	9.2	80	**36**	22	91.3	16	29	**55**	55.2	**64**	**65**	98.5	112
1962	HOU	14	14	**11−3**	197	418	47.1	2,810	6.7	78	27	**42**	51.3	11	26	54	42.3	48	49	98.0	81
1963	HOU	14	13	6−7	224	423	53.0	3,003	7.1	80	24	25	70.1	9	24	46	37.5	39	39	**100.0**	66
1964	HOU	14	13	4−9	**262**	**505**	51.9	3,287	6.5	80	17	27	61.4	13	29	49	44.8	37	38	97.4	76
1965	HOU	14	12	3−9	186	442	42.1	2,542	5.8	**95**	20	30	47.9	11	21	45	52.4	28	28	**100.0**	61
1966	HOU	14	8	3−5	122	271	45.0	1,764	6.5	79	17	21	55.3	16	30	51	53.3	39	40	97.5	87
1967	OAK	14	0	—	15	38	39.5	285	7.5	50	3	3	59.6	20	30	46	66.7	56	57	98.2	116
1968	OAK	14	1	1−0	30	49	**61.2**	522	**10.7**	94	6	2	**120.1**	21	34	48	61.8	54	54	**100.0**	**117**
1969	OAK	14	0	—	6	13	46.2	73	5.6	20	2	1	71.5	20	**37**	46	54.1	45	45	**100.0**	105
1970	OAK	14	0	—	29	55	52.7	461	8.4	44	6	5	79.4	16	29	52	55.2	36	36	**100.0**	84
1971	OAK	14	0	—	32	58	55.2	378	6.5	37	4	6	58.6	15	22	42	68.2	41	42	97.6	86
1972	OAK	14	0	—	5	15	33.3	77	5.1	26	1	0	73.5	17	26	48	65.4	44	44	**100.0**	95
1973	OAK	14	0	—	0	0	0.0	0	0.0	0	0	0	0.0	**23**	33	49	**69.7**	31	31	**100.0**	100
1974	OAK	14	0	—	1	4	25.0	28	7.0	28	1	0	95.8	11	17	49	64.7	44	46	95.7	77
1975	OAK	14	0	—	1	3	33.3	11	3.7	11	0	1	5.6	13	21	37	61.9	44	48	91.7	83
Career		340	106	53−50−1	1,911	4,007	47.7	26,920	6.7	95	236	277	60.6	335	641	55	52.4	943	959	98.3	1,948

=== Postseason ===
Year	Team	Games			Passing									Kicking						
Year	Team	GP	GS	Record	Cmp	Att	Pct	Yds	Y/A	Lng	TD	Int	Rtg	FGM	FGA	FG%	XPM	XPA	XP%	Pts
1950	CHI	1	0	—	0	0	—	0	—	0	0	0	—	0	0	—	0	0	—	0
1956	CHI	1	1	0–1	12	27	44.4	140	5.2	—	0	1	45.3	0	0	—	1	1	100.0	1
1960	HOU	1	1	**1–0**	16	31	51.6	**301**	**9.7**	**88**	**3**	0	**117.8**	1	2	50.0	3	3	100.0	6
1961	HOU	1	1	**1–0**	18	40	45.0	160	4.0	35	1	**5**	25.0	1	1	**100.0**	1	1	100.0	4
1962	HOU	1	1	0–1	**23**	**46**	50.0	261	5.7	24	1	**5**	35.1	1	3	33.3	2	2	100.0	5
1967	OAK	2	0	—	0	2	0.0	0	0.0	0	0	0	39.6	4	**7**	57.1	6	6	100.0	18
1968	OAK	2	0	—	0	0	—	0	—	0	0	0	—	**5**	6	83.3	7	7	100.0	**22**
1969	OAK	2	0	—	3	11	27.3	57	5.2	33	0	3	9.1	0	3	0.0	**9**	**9**	100.0	9
1970	OAK	2	0	—	17	32	**53.1**	271	8.5	38	2	3	63.4	1	2	50.0	5	5	100.0	8
1972	OAK	1	0	—	0	0	—	0	—	0	0	0	—	0	0	—	1	1	100.0	1
1973	OAK	2	0	—	0	0	—	0	—	0	0	0	—	**5**	**7**	71.4	4	4	100.0	19
1974	OAK	2	0	—	0	0	—	0	—	0	0	0	—	2	3	66.7	5	5	100.0	11
1975	OAK	2	0	—	0	0	—	0	—	0	0	0	—	2	5	40.0	5	5	100.0	11
Career		20	4	2–2	89	189	47.1	1,190	6.3	88	7	17	42.4	22	39	56.4	49	49	100.0	115

== Records and honors ==
Blanda finished his 26 professional football seasons having completed 1,911 of 4,007 pass attempts for 26,920 yards and 236 touchdowns. Blanda also held the NFL record for most interceptions thrown with 277, until Brett Favre broke it on October 14, 2007. He rushed for 344 yards and 9 touchdowns on the ground, kicked 335 of 641 field goals, and 943 of 959 extra points, giving him 2,002 total points. Additional stats include 1 interception, 2 kickoff returns for 19 yards, 22 punts for 809 yards, and 23 fumble recoveries.

Blanda holds the following professional football records:

- Most seasons played: 26 (1949–1958, 1960–1975)
- Most seasons scoring a point: 26
- One of two players to play in 4 different decades. Blanda played in the 1940s, 1950s, 1960s, 1970s and John Carney, who played in the 1980s, 1990s, 2000s and 2010s
- Oldest player to play in an NFL game: 48 years, 109 days
- Most interceptions thrown, single season: 42 (1962)
- Passing touchdowns in a game: 7 (Tied with 7 others) November 19, 1961, vs. New York Titans
- Most PATs made (943) and attempted (959)

He is the placekicker on the All-Time All-AFL Team, and was one of only 20 players to play all ten years of the AFL, as well as one of only three who were in every AFL game their teams played. Blanda was elected to the Pro Football Hall of Fame in 1981, his first year of eligibility, and also was inducted into the University of Kentucky Hall of Fame.

Blanda held the record for most professional football games played with 340 until September 26, 2004, when it was broken by another placekicker, Morten Andersen as well as the record for most consecutive games played until September 26, 1976, by defensive end Jim Marshall. He still holds the record for most games played by an AFL/NFL player who was not exclusively a kicker or punter. His 114 postseason points were an NFL record at the time of his retirement.

Blanda broke Lou Groza's career scoring record in 1971, a record he held until 2000 when it was broken by Gary Anderson. Blanda's 2,002 total points are still good for 7th on the all-time scoring list.

U.S. Route 119 in Blanda's hometown of Youngwood, Pennsylvania, was renamed George Blanda Boulevard in 1985.

In 1999, Blanda was ranked number 98 on The Sporting News' list of the 100 Greatest Football Players.

Blanda was the first-ever recorded fantasy football draft pick when the game was first created in 1962 by The Greater Oakland Professional Pigskin Prognosticators League.

== Personal life ==
Blanda was the son of a Slovak-born Pittsburgh-area coal miner. He was married to Betty Harris from December 17, 1949, until his death on September 27, 2010, ten days after his 83rd birthday. They had two children.

=== Death ===
According to the Pro Football Hall of Fame, Blanda died after a "short illness" on September 27, 2010, just 10 days after his birthday. He was 83 years old. A moment of silence was held in Blanda's honor prior to the start of the September 27, 2010, game between the Green Bay Packers and the Chicago Bears on Monday Night Football, from Soldier Field.

== Legacy ==
The 1970s TV series Happy Days was set in 1950s Milwaukee, Wisconsin. In the Season 3 episode "Football Frolics", first aired January 20, 1976, Richie Cunningham (played by Ron Howard) and Ralph Malph (Donny Most) are watching the December 9, 1956, Chicago Bears – Chicago Cardinals televised game. After Ed Brown's pass to Harlon Hill is intercepted by the Cardinals, Richie wants "the other quarterback" put in. Ralph says that the other quarterback is "washed up. He's old. He's 30. He's got no future." Richie argues back, "George Blanda has two or three good years left." The joke was that Blanda, 19 years after the date depicted in the show, was still playing.

Towards the end of his career, Blanda also served as a commercial spokesman for Chrysler Corporation. He was often seen in television commercials promoting the full-size Dodge Truck line, most notably its new "Club Cab" after the line received a complete redesign in 1973. Blanda also appeared in commercials for Schaefer Beer, Brut cologne, Kellogg's cereals and many others during the early 1970s.

== See also ==
- List of American Football League players
- Bay Area Sports Hall of Fame
