= 1961 American Football League Championship Game =

Coordinates: 32.7205°N 117.1505°W

1961 AFL Championship Game
Houston Oilers (Eastern) (10–3–1)	San Diego Chargers (Western) (12–2)
10	3
Head coach: Wally Lemm	Head coach: Sid Gillman
	1	2	3	4	Total
HOU	0	3	7	0	10
SD	0	0	0	3	3
- Date: December 24, 1961
- Stadium: Balboa Stadium; San Diego, California
- Attendance: 29,556

TV in the United States
- Network: ABC
- Announcers: Jack Buck, George Ratterman, and Bob Neal

Location in the United States

The 1961 AFL Championship Game was a rematch of the first American Football League title game, between the Houston Oilers and the San Diego Chargers. It was played on December 24 at Balboa Stadium in San Diego, California, and the Oilers were three-point favorites.

== Background ==
The defending champion Houston Oilers were headlined in 1961 by remarkable turnaround. Lou Rymkus started the season as head coach, but an opening day victory against Oakland was their last victory for a month. They lost three in a row (including one to San Diego) before a 31–31 tie to the Boston Patriots saw Rymkus fired by owner Bud Adams in favor of Wally Lemm, who had been an assistant coach with the team in 1960 before being coaxed back from the sporting goods industry to serve the same position in 1961. The Oilers pulled off nine straight wins that started with a 38–7 victory over Dallas and finished with wins over San Diego to finish with a record of (10–3–1), one game ahead of Boston, the only other team with a winning record in the AFL. Lemm was named AFL Coach of the Year for his nine-game tenure. They scored 513 points over the season (which was 100 more than the next best team) with an offense that was the best in the league, particularly in passing. Quarterback George Blanda threw 36 touchdowns on 3,330 yards passing to be selected as the AFL MVP; the 36 touchdowns thrown by Blanda would stand as the all-time record for the existence of the league.

At the end of the 1960 American Football League season, the Chargers elected to move down the California coast from Los Angeles to San Diego due to attendance problems. San Diego had a tremendous start as the defending Western champion, winning their first eleven games of the season and clinching the division with room to spare (finishing (12–2)), doing so on the efforts numerous AFL All-Stars on both sides of the ball in players such as quarterback Jack Kemp and defensive end Earl Faison (who won AFL Rookie of the Year that year); the Chargers forced 66 turnovers on the season while ranking first in overall defense by allowing just 15 points per game.

== Game summary ==
The 1961 AFL championship game was the sixth meeting between the two teams during the calendar year. The previous season's title game, won by Houston 24–16, had been played on January 1, 1961. The Chargers had won two exhibition contests with the Oilers in the summer, and they had split during the regular season, with the home teams winning.

The second AFL title game kicked off at 1:30 pm PST and scoring was held down by sloppy play and turnovers: Houston had seven and San Diego had six. The only score of the first half came on a 46-yard George Blanda field goal, coming after a nine-yard San Diego punt.

In the third quarter, the Oilers had the only sustained drive of the game, which went for 80 yards. With a third-and-five at the San Diego 35, Blanda rolled to his right and found Billy Cannon open at the 17. Cannon jumped to make the catch, shrugged off a would-be tackler, and scampered into the end zone for a touchdown, his second in two straight low-scoring championship games. Blanda's extra point put Houston up 10–0. The Chargers scored early in the fourth quarter on a 12-yard field goal by George Blair, but they could not score again, and the Oilers won 10–3. Blanda went 18-of-40 for 160 yards with a touchdown and five interceptions. Blanda was the fifth quarterback to throw five interceptions in a playoff game but became the first (and as of 2025, only) quarterback to throw five interceptions in a winning effort for a postseason game. Chargers counterpart Jack Kemp went 17-of-32 for 226 yards for four interceptions.

San Diego head coach Sid Gillman was involved in a heated post-game discussion at mid-field with an official, field judge John Morrow, who was wrestled to the ground by Charger safety Bob Zeman.

The game was not a sellout; the attendance of 29,556 was several thousand under Balboa Stadium's capacity.

Houston Oilers 10, San Diego Chargers 3

Quarter	1	2	3	4	Total
Oilers	0	3	7	0	10
Chargers	0	0	0	3	3

at Balboa Stadium, San Diego, California

- Date: Sunday, December 24, 1961
- Game time: 1:30 p.m. PST
- Game weather: 53 degrees, relative humidity 77%, wind 6 mph
- Game attendance: 29,556
- TV announcers (ABC): Jack Buck, George Ratterman, and Bob Neal
- Pro-Football-Reference.com

Game information

Scoring

- First quarter
- Second quarter
  - HOU – George Blanda 46-yard field goal, Oilers 3–0
- Third quarter
  - HOU – Billy Cannon 35-yard pass from George Blanda (Blanda kick), Oilers 10–0
- Fourth quarter
  - SD – George Blair 12-yard field goal, Oilers 10–3

Top passers

- LA – Jack Kemp – 17/32, 226 yards, 4 INT
- HOU – George Blanda – 18/40, 160 yards, 1 TD, 5 INT

Top rushers

- LA – Bo Roberson – 8 rushes, 37 yards
- HOU – Charley Tolar – 16 rushes, 52 yards

Top receivers

- LA – Dave Kocourek – 7 receptions, 123 yards
- HOU – Billy Cannon – 5 receptions, 53 yards, 1 TD

== Statistics ==
Statistics	Oilers	Chargers
First Downs	18	15
Rushing yards	96	79
Yards per carry	2.9	3.9
Passing yards	160	226
Sack Yds Lost	0–0	6–49
Total yards	256	305
Fumbles-Lost	5–1	2–2
Turnovers	7	6
Penalties-Yards	5–68	10–106

== See also ==
- 1961 AFL season
- AFL Championship Games
- 1961 NFL Championship Game

Preceded by Houston Oilers; 1960 AFL Champions	Houston Oilers; American Football League Champions; 1961	Succeeded by Dallas Texans; 1962 AFL Champions
