= 1968 American Football League playoffs =

American football playoffs

1968 AFL playoffs
- Dates: December 22–29, 1968
- Season: 1968
- Teams: 3
- Defending champions: Oakland Raiders
- Champion: New York Jets
- Runner-up: Oakland Raiders
AFL playoffs
← 1967	1969 →

== Playoffs ==
A tie in the Western Division standings necessitated a tiebreaker playoff game, the second in the AFL's nine-year history. The Kansas City Chiefs and Oakland Raiders both finished the regular season at 12–2. The New York Jets (11–3), winners of the Eastern Division, were idle, waiting to host the AFL Championship Game the following week.

=== Tournament bracket ===
Western Division playoff December 22			AFL Championship Game; December 29
			E	at New York Jets (11–3)	27
W	Kansas City Chiefs (12–2)	6	W	Oakland Raiders	23
W	at Oakland Raiders (12–2)	41

=== Western Division playoff ===
Oakland Raiders 41, Kansas City Chiefs 6

Quarter	1	2	3	4	Total
Chiefs	0	6	0	0	6
Raiders	21	7	0	13	41

at Oakland-Alameda County Coliseum, Oakland, California

- Date: Sunday, December 22, 1968
- Game time: 1:00 p.m. PST
- Game attendance: 53,605
- TV: NBC

Game information
Scoring
- First quarter
  - OAK – Biletnikoff 24 pass from Lamonica (Blanda kick), OAK 7-0
  - OAK – Wells 23 pass from Lamonica (Blanda kick), OAK 14-0
  - OAK – Biletnikoff 44 pass from Lamonica (Blanda kick), OAK 21-0
- Second quarter
  - KC – Field goal Stenerud 10, OAK 21-3
  - KC – Field goal Stenerud 8, OAK 21-6
  - OAK – Biletnikoff 54 pass from Lamonica (Blanda kick), OAK 28-6
- Third quarter
- Fourth quarter
  - OAK – Wells 35 pass from Lamonica (Blanda kick), OAK 35-6
  - OAK – Field goal Blanda 41, OAK 38-6
  - OAK – Field goal Blanda 40, OAK 41-6

On a five-game winning streak with sizable victory margins of late, Kansas City was favored by 3½ points; the Raiders had won their last eight, but had close calls in the last three. The teams had split the season series, each winning at home.

Oakland quarterback Daryle Lamonica torched the Chiefs for five touchdown passes, while the Raiders defense intercepted four passes from Chiefs quarterback Len Dawson and held KC to a pair of field goals in the second quarter.

After forcing Kansas City to punt from their 47-yard line, Oakland drove 80 yards for a touchdown, aided by a controversial third down pass interference call against Kansas City after the ball had already hit the ground. After the penalty, Lamonica completed two passes to Fred Biletnikoff, the first for 18 yards, and the second a 24-yard touchdown pass. A terrible punt into the rain by Jerrel Wilson inside his own goal line enabled the Raiders to start their next drive on the Chiefs 25-yard line, and they scored another touchdown with Lamonica's 23-yard pass to Warren Wells. After some punting from both teams, Oakland got the ball with 1:02 left in the quarter. Lamonica started the drive with a short pass to rookie running back Charlie Smith, who turned it into a 26-yard gain. On the next play, Lamonica hooked up with Biletnikoff for a 44-yard touchdown pass to give the Raiders a 21–0 lead.

In the second quarter, Kansas City got a golden opportunity to get back in the game when Dawson completed a 55-yard pass to receiver Otis Taylor, who managed to drag defensive back George Atkinson nearly twenty yards before he finally went down on the Raiders eight-yard line. But despite six plays after that as a result of a Raiders penalty, Kansas City could not get into the end zone and had to settle for Jan Stenerud's 10-yard field goal. Kansas City later blew another big opportunity after a Wilson punt pinned the Raiders back on their own one-yard line. On the next play, Lamonica threw a pass right into the hands of Chiefs DB Bobby Bell, only to see him inexplicably drop the ball. Kansas City still managed to force a punt and got the ball back with great field position on the Raiders 38. On the next play, Dawson completed a 31-yard pass to receiver Frank Pitts, but once again Kansas City could not dent the goal line and settled for another Stenerud field goal, making the score 21–6. Kansas City seemed to be inching their way to a comeback, but it was snuffed out with twelve seconds left in the half, when Lamonica completed a long pass to Biletnikoff, who evaded three Chiefs defenders on the way to a 54-yard touchdown reception, giving the Raiders a 28–6 halftime lead.

In the first half alone, Lamonica had completed nine passes for 220 yards and four touchdowns.

Both teams blew scoring chances in the third quarter, as Stenerud missed a 39-yard field goal, while Lamonica threw an incomplete pass on fourth and goal from the Chiefs 1-yard line. However, the period ended with Oakland driving into Chiefs territory, a drive that ended with Lamonica's 5th touchdown pass, throwing a 35-yard scoring pass to Wells after the man covering accidentally fell down. He had a chance to tie Daryle LaMonica's postseason record of six touchdown passes later on, but Wells ended up dropping a potential touchdown catch on the 3-yard line. However, they did get to score two more times on field goals by veteran kicker George Blanda, which were set up by interceptions from defensive backs Willie Brown and Nemiah Wilson.

Lamonica finished the game with 19 of 39 completions for 347 yards and 5 touchdowns. His top receiver was Biletnikoff, who caught 7 passes for 180 yards and three touchdowns, while Wells added four receptions for 93 yards and two scores. Smith was the leading rusher of the game with 13 carries for 74 yards, while also catching five passes for 52. Dawson finished the day 17/36 for 254 yards with four interceptions. Taylor caught four passes for 117 yards.

=== AFL Championship Game ===
New York Jets 27, Oakland Raiders 23

Quarter	1	2	3	4	Total
Raiders	0	10	3	10	23
Jets	10	3	7	7	27

at Shea Stadium, Flushing, Queens, New York City, New York

- Date: Sunday, December 29, 1968
- Game time: 1:00 p.m. EST
- Game attendance: 62,627
- Referee: Walt Fitzgerald
- TV announcers (NBC): Curt Gowdy, Kyle Rote

Game information
Scoring
- First quarter
  - NY – Maynard 14 pass from Namath (Turner kick), NY 7-0
  - NY – Field goal Turner 33, NY 10-0
- Second quarter
  - OAK – Biletnikoff 29 pass from Lamonica (Blanda kick), NY 10-7
  - NY – Field goal Turner 36, NY 13-7
  - OAK – Field goal Blanda 26, NY 13-10
- Third quarter
  - OAK – Field goal Blanda 9, Tied 13-13
  - NY – Lammons 20 pass from Namath (Turner kick), NY 20-13
- Fourth quarter
  - OAK – Field goal Blanda 20, NY 20-16
  - OAK – Banaszak 4 run (Blanda kick), OAK 23-20
  - NY – Maynard 6 pass from Namath (Turner kick), NY 27-23

After Jets quarterback Joe Namath threw an interception that enabled Oakland to take a 4th quarter lead, he led the Jets 68 yards in just 55 seconds to score a go-ahead touchdown pass to Don Maynard with 7:24 left in the game. Then New York's defense stopped Oakland on their three remaining drives to hold on to victory, avenging their regular season loss to the Raiders in the infamous Heidi Game.

A 28-yard punt by Oakland's Mike Eischeid gave New York the ball on the Raiders 44-yard line on their first possession, and they took advantage of the short field with a 4-play scoring drive. Namath completed two 14-yard passes to Maynard on it, the second one a touchdown to give the Jets an early 7-0 lead. Meanwhile, Raiders quarterback Daryle Lamonica completed just one of his first 13 pass attempts. His first completion was a 36-yard pass to Billy Cannon, but the Raiders ended up with no points on that drive when George Blanda hit the cross bar attempting a 45-yard field goal. New York then drove to a 33-yard field goal by Jim Turner, giving them a 10-0 lead in the final minutes of the first quarter.

After being completely dominated up to this point, the Raiders offense finally got into gear as Lamonica completed passes to Pete Banaszak and Fred Biletnikoff for gains of 11 and 15 yards. Then he hit fullback Hewritt Dixon for a 23-yard gain on the last play of the first quarter. As the second quarter opened up, Lamonica finished the 80-yard drive with a 29-yard touchdown pass to Biletnikoff, making the score 10-7. The rest of the quarter would result in nothing but field goal attempts, with Turner missing one from 44 yards, but connecting from 35, while Blanda kicked a 26-yard field goal right before halftime to make the score 13-10.

Lamonica opened the third quarter with a 37-yard completion to Biletnikoff. Then his 40-yard pass to receiver Warren Wells gave Oakland a first down on the Jets 6-yard line. However, rush attempts over the next three plays resulted in just 5 yards. Faced with 4th and goal on the 1, coach John Rauch decided to play conservative and had Blanda kick a 9-yard field goal that tied the game at 13. New York responded by driving 80 yards in 14 plays to retake the lead, 20-13, on Namath's 20-yard touchdown pass to tight end Pete Lammons with one minute left until the 4th quarter.

Oakland responded to the touchdown with Lamonica's 57-yard completion to Biletnikoff setting up a 20-yard Blanda field goal, cutting the score to 20-16. Then Raiders defensive back George Atkinson intercepted a pass from Namath and returned it 32 yards to the Jets 5-yard line. On the next play, Banaszak ran the ball into the end zone, giving Oakland their first lead of the game at 23-20 with 8:18 remaining on the clock.

However, this turned out to be short lived. After starting out the ensuing drive with a 10-yard completion to George Sauer, Namath completed a 52-yard pass to Maynard at the Raiders 6-yard line. On the next play, he connected with Maynard in the end zone, giving the Jets a 27-23 lead at the 7:47 mark. Oakland had three more drives with the time remaining, but failed to score each time. Oakland took the ball after Maynard's touchdown and drove to New York's 26-yard line, where they ended up faced with 4th down and 10. Even though more than 5 minutes remained in the game, Rauch decided to try to go for a first down rather than kick a field goal, but this did not pay off as Lamonica was sacked by New York lineman Verlon Biggs on the next play. Following a punt, Oakland drove to the New York 24-yard line, only to lose the ball again when Lamonica's intended swing pass to Charline Smith sailed behind him, resulting in an accidental fumbled lateral that was recovered by linebacker Ralph Baker. The next time the Raiders got the ball, it was on their own 22-yard line with 42 seconds left in regulation. The Jets defense manage to stop the drive at midfield as time expired to preserve their lead and win the game.

Neither quarterback distinguished himself with his passing accuracy. Namath completed 19 of 49 passes for 266 yards and 3 touchdowns, with 1 interception. Lamonica completed 20 of 47 passes for 401 yards and a touchdown. Biletnikoff was the leading receiver of the game with 7 receptions for 190 yards and a touchdown, while Maynard caught 6 passes for 118 yards and two scores. Jets running back Matt Snell was the top rusher of the game with 71 yards on 19 carries, along with a 15-yard reception, while Emerson Boozer chipped in 51 rushing yards for New York. In addition to his 32-yard interception return, Atkinson returned 4 kickoffs for 112 yards. Oakland lost despite outgaining the Jets in total yards, 443-400.

== See also ==
- 1968 American Football League season
- 1968 NFL playoffs
- 1968 AFL Championship Game box score
