= Heidi Game =

1968 American Football League game

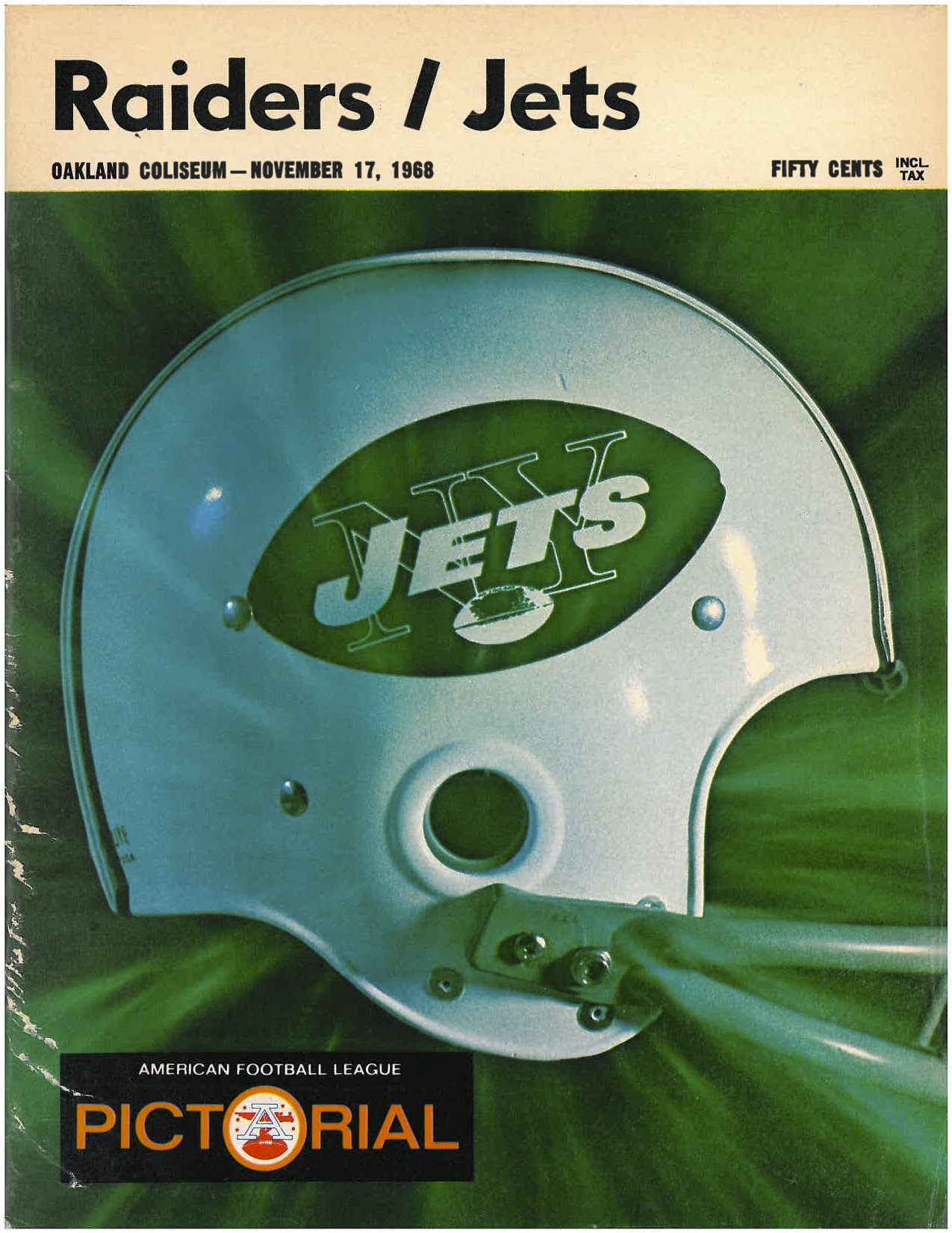
- Program cover from the Jets-Raiders game from November 17, 1968
New York Jets (7–3)	Oakland Raiders (8–2)
32	43
Head coach: Weeb Ewbank	Head coach: John Rauch
	1	2	3	4	Total
NYJ	6	6	7	13	32
OAK	7	7	8	21	43
- Date: November 17, 1968
- Stadium: Oakland–Alameda County Coliseum; Oakland, California
- Favorite: Raiders by 7 1/2 points
- Referee: Bob Finley
- Attendance: 53,318

TV in the United States
- Network: NBC
- Announcers: Curt Gowdy and Al DeRogatis

The Heidi Game was a 1968 American Football League (AFL) game between the Oakland Raiders and the visiting New York Jets. The contest, held on November 17, 1968, was notable for its exciting finish, in which Oakland scored two touchdowns in the final minute to win the game 43–32. However, NBC, the game's television broadcaster, decided to break away from its coverage on the East Coast to broadcast the television film Heidi, which caused many viewers to miss the Raiders' comeback.

In the late 1960s, few professional football games took longer than two and a half hours to play, and the standard three-hour time slot allotted to the Jets and Raiders was thought to be adequate. A high-scoring contest, with a combined 34 points scored in the fourth quarter, together with a number of injuries and penalties for the two bitter AFL rivals, caused the game to run longer than usual. NBC executives had originally ordered that Heidi begin at 7 p.m. EST, but then decided to allow the game to air to its conclusion. However, communicating this revised plan to the technicians running NBC's master control proved impossible – as 7 p.m. approached, NBC's switchboards were jammed by viewers phoning to inquire about the night's schedule, preventing the planned change from being communicated. Heidi began as scheduled, preempting the final moments of the game and the two Oakland touchdowns in the eastern half of the country, to the outrage of viewers.

Response to the pre-emption by viewers and other critics was negative; the family members of several Jets players were unaware of the game's actual conclusion, while NBC received further criticism for its poor timing in displaying the final score of the game during the Heidi movie. NBC's president Julian Goodman formally apologized for the incident. The Jets and Raiders met again on December 29 in New York in the AFL Championship Game, with the Jets winning 27–23. Two weeks later, they defeated the Baltimore Colts of the National Football League (NFL) in Super Bowl III.

In the aftermath of the incident, NBC installed special "Heidi phones", with a connection to a different telephone exchange from other network phones, to ensure that network personnel could communicate under similar circumstances. The game also had an influence on sports broadcasting practices; the future National Football League would contractually stipulate that all game telecasts be shown to their conclusion in the markets of the visiting team, while other major leagues and events adopted similar mandates. In 1997, the Heidi Game was voted the most memorable regular season game in professional football history.

== Background ==
=== Jets–Raiders rivalry ===
When the Jets played the Raiders, it wasn't a rivalry. It was a war.

— Frank Ramos, Director of Public Relations, New York Jets

The Jets and Raiders were founding members of the American Football League; both teams began to play in 1960, the Jets under the name New York Titans. The two teams had little success in their early years, playing so poorly that both the Titans and Raiders were allowed to draft players from other AFL teams following the 1962 season. In 1967, the Jets, under the guidance of coach Weeb Ewbank and third-year quarterback Joe Namath, posted their first winning record at 8–5–1. Oakland, on the other hand, won the Western Division in 1967 with a 13–1 mark under coach John Rauch and then the AFL Championship Game over the Houston Oilers, 40–7, but fell to the Green Bay Packers in Super Bowl II. Both teams were seen as likely contenders for the 1968 AFL Championship.

Any time we went into a Raiders game, we knew we were gonna come out of it sore. Guaranteed to get the crap beat out of you. They were a rough, physical team. Dislike isn't the word I'd use to describe how we felt about them. Downright hatred would be more accurate.

— Jets guard Randy Rasmussen

The two teams did not play in the same division. However, each AFL team played all other teams in the league each year, allowing the Raiders and Jets to forge a bitter rivalry. In 1963, Oakland general manager (later owner) Al Davis traded guard Dan Ficca to New York during training camp, without mentioning to Ewbank (who was also the Jets' general manager) that Ficca would not be released from his military service for another six weeks. In 1966, with less than a minute to go and the Raiders leading at the new Oakland Coliseum, 28–20, Jets left tackle Winston Hill predicted to Namath in the huddle that the man he was blocking, defensive end Ben Davidson, would rush on the next play, leaving the Raiders exposed to a draw play. Namath called the draw, and handed the ball off to running back Emerson Boozer for 47 yards and a touchdown. After a Jets two-point conversion, the game ended in a 28–28 tie, and an embittered Davidson stated, "I'll get even. They still have to play us next year." They did, twice. In Week 4, the Jets defeated the Raiders at Shea Stadium, 27–14, the Raiders' only regular season loss. In Week 14, each team's 13th game, the teams met again, in Oakland.

The 1967 game was one of the most vicious in Jet history. Namath was slugged to the turf; he was hit late, punched in the groin. They aimed for his knees, tried to step on his hands ... And Davidson got Namath. He got him on a rollout, with a right that started somewhere between Hayward and Alameda. It knocked Namath's helmet flying, and broke his jaw, but Namath didn't miss a play, and he threw for 370 yards and three TD's in that 38–27 loss.

— Sportswriter Paul Zimmerman

Davidson stated about his play in the Oakland victory, "I don't think my tackle broke Namath's cheekbone. Not that I care ... Namath says that he's been beat up worse by girls. He's asking for it again." The Jets loss to the Raiders in 1967 knocked New York out of a tie for first place in their division – the AFL East was won by the Houston Oilers.

In the 1968 season, the Jets, Raiders, San Diego Chargers, and Kansas City Chiefs established themselves as the leading AFL teams. Going into Week 11 of the season, each had lost only two games; the Chiefs, who had not yet had a bye week, had eight wins, the others seven. In an era with no wild card teams, the Raiders needed a victory over the Jets in Week 11 to avoid falling a game and a half behind the Chiefs in the AFL West – finishing second, however good their record, would end their season. The Jets, on the other hand, would clinch at least a tie for the AFL East title with a victory over the Raiders in their only regular season meeting. Depending on the results of other games, the Jets could win the division if they beat the Raiders, gaining the right to host (Note: The AFL Championship Game was hosted in alternate years by the champions of the East and West divisions. In the 1968 season, the AFL East champion would host.) the AFL Championship Game, the winner of which would play the NFL champion in the Super Bowl. The ill-feeling of previous years was resurrected by an immense blown-up photograph, posted at Raider headquarters, of Davidson smashing Namath in the head. The photographed play was said to have broken the quarterback's jaw (though Namath stated he had broken it on a tough piece of steak, and some claim it was Raiders defensive end Ike Lassiter who injured Namath). Although the poster, which had been placed by Davis, was removed before the game, word of this "intimidation through photography" reached the Jets in New York.

Namath, interviewed by reporters, stated that he liked the Raiders the least of any AFL team. In 2000, New York Times sportswriter Dave Anderson wrote of the Jets' preparations for the Oakland game:

When the Jets went to Oakland in 1968, that photo on the Raiders' wall symbolized the rivalry as well as Coach Weeb Ewbank's distrust of Davis. Whenever a helicopter flew anywhere near a Jets practice the week before a game against the Raiders, Ewbank would look up and shake his fist. He just knew Davis had somebody spying on the Jets.

The Raiders declined to allow New York reporters to watch practices, a courtesy Ewbank extended to Oakland pressmen. Raiders assistant coach (later head coach) John Madden was responsible for the exchange of game films with upcoming opponents; he sent the films to the Jets through Chicago so they would arrive a day or two late, reasoning that Davis, not he, would be blamed for the delay. Ewbank blamed Davis for heavily watering the Coliseum field to slow the Jets' speedy receivers, a tactic the Oakland co-owner credited to Madden.

=== Telecast preparation ===
NBC's preparations for the November 17 game at Oakland were routine. The game was to be televised to most of the country beginning at 4 p.m. EST, with Curt Gowdy and Al DeRogatis announcing. NBC anticipated a good game that viewers would likely watch all the way through, and then leave the television tuned to that network for the evening, "a perfect lead in for the network's special presentation of Heidi, the Johanna Spyri children's classic, which was scheduled to air after the game at 7 p.m. (EST)". The television film was preempting Walt Disney's Wonderful World of Color, the program normally shown by NBC on Sunday at that time. As the game started at 1 p.m. Pacific Standard Time, the western half of the country would have to wait after the game for 7 p.m. local time before seeing Heidi. Under television rules at the time, the Jets–Raiders game was blacked out within 90 miles of Oakland even though it was a sellout, leaving KRON-TV (channel 4, the local NBC affiliate serving Oakland at the time) and other NBC affiliates in nearby markets unable to show the game.

Heidi was heavily promoted by NBC in television commercials and newspaper advertisements. The network hoped to gain a large audience, especially among families. Individual commercials for the film could not be purchased by advertisers; instead, the entire two-hour block was sold by NBC to watch manufacturer Timex, which would air the film and have its own commercials run during the broadcast. The New York Times touted Heidi as the best TV program of the day. Under the terms of the contract between Timex and NBC, Heidi had to air promptly at 7 p.m. Eastern (6 p.m. Central) and could not be delayed or joined in progress for any reason. Dom Cosentino, in his 2014 article on the Heidi Game, points out the irony that Timex, a watch company, was the sponsor; the game would become infamous for its telecast, cut short because of time.

Steven Travers, in his history of the Raiders, noted:

That Sunday evening at 7 p.m. the family classic Heidi was scheduled. This is the well-known story of a little Swiss girl who lives with her grandfather in the Alps, a staple of wholesome entertainment. In the days before cable, pay-per-view, VHS, DVD, TiVo, record, rewind, and 700 channels – when the choices came down to what NBC, ABC, CBS, and maybe a handful of local stations wanted to show the public, TV viewers scheduled their days around events like Heidi. It was on once a year. If one missed it, they missed it until the next year.

The nerve center for NBC was known as Broadcast Operations Control (BOC). Dick Cline, the network BOC supervisor for sports telecasts, prepared the series of network orders which would result in the game running as scheduled, followed by Heidi. Cline had no reason to believe that the game would run over three hours; no professional football game presented by NBC ever had. Nonetheless, other NBC executives stressed that Heidi must start as scheduled. NBC president Julian Goodman told his executives before the weekend that the well-sponsored, well-promoted film must start on time. NBC Sports executive producer Don "Scotty" Connal took care to tell the game producer, Don Ellis, that Heidi must start at 7:00 in the East, over Ellis's objection that he had been trained never to leave a game in progress. Connal told Ellis that NBC had sold the time and was obligated to switch to the film.

NBC ran three BOCs, in Burbank, California, Chicago, and New York City, with the last the largest. Cline was stationed at the New York BOC for the game. In the era before satellite transmission, programming was transmitted by coaxial cable line, with the cooperation of the telephone company. For this game, the Burbank BOC was to receive the feed from Oakland, insert commercials and network announcements, and send the modified feed via telephone wire to a switching station west of Chicago near the Mississippi River. An engineer was stationed there to activate the Oakland feed into the entire network when the game began, to cut it on instruction and then to return to his base. He had been told to expect at 6:58:20 Eastern Time a network announcement for Heidi, after which he was to cut the feed from Burbank, and the Heidi feed from New York would begin. This placed Burbank in effective control of whether the engineer would cut the feed, since he would act upon hearing the announcement.

Connal, Cline's boss, was available in case of trouble, watching from his home in Connecticut. His superior, NBC Sports vice president Chet Simmons, who alternated weekends with Connal as on-call in the event of difficulties, was also watching from his Manhattan home. NBC president Goodman and NBC Sports head Carl Lindemann also turned on the game in their New York area homes. The Buffalo Bills–San Diego Chargers game (a 21–6 win for the Chargers), shown as the first of a network doubleheader, was running long in its 2½-hour time slot, and NBC unhesitatingly cut its ending to go to the Jets and Raiders.

== Gameday events ==
=== The game ===
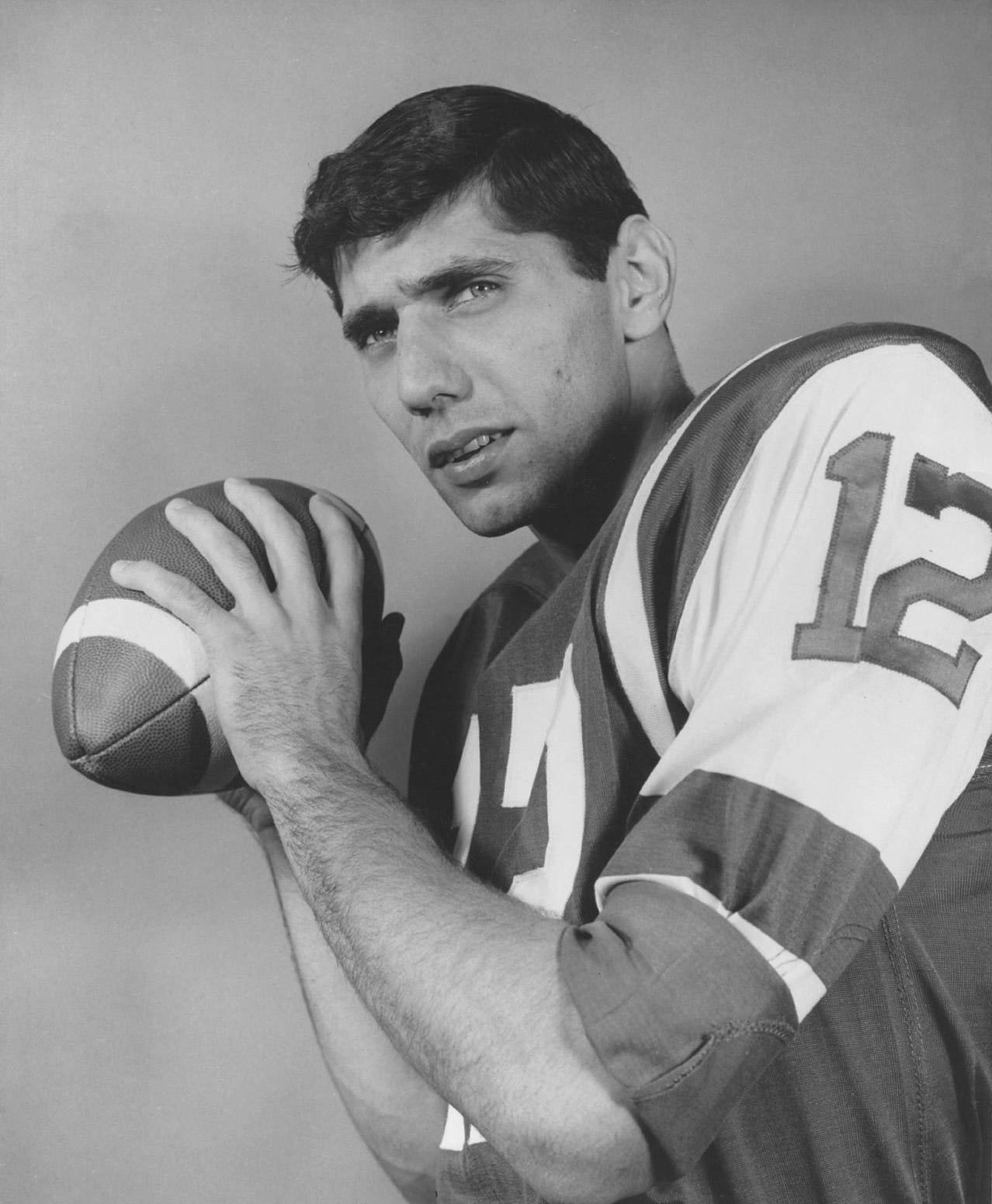
New York Jets quarterback Joe Namath

On the opening kickoff, the Jets were penalized for a personal foul against the Raiders. The Jets took an early 6–0 lead on a pair of Jim Turner field goals of 44 and 18 yards. The Raiders, led by quarterback Daryle Lamonica, who had been battling recent back and knee injuries, scored the game's first touchdown, taking a 7–6 lead on a 22-yard pass to receiver Warren Wells towards the end of the first quarter. The Raiders added to their lead when Lamonica threw a 48-yard pass to tight end Billy Cannon at the beginning of the second quarter. (Note: "Oakland Raiders v. New York Jets" (official typewritten statistical sheets). American Football League, November 17, 1968. On file with the Pro Football Hall of Fame and Museum, Canton OH, "Heidi Game" file.)

However, the Jets cut into Oakland's lead when Namath drove the offense 73 yards down field and ran the ball in for a 1-yard touchdown with five seconds remaining in the first half. The Jets lined up as if to kick the extra point, but holder and backup quarterback Babe Parilli tried to complete a two-point conversion pass, which fell incomplete. The Raiders led the Jets 14–12 at halftime.

Approximately five minutes into the third quarter, Namath forged another Jets drive, following an interception by safety Jim Hudson, that ended with halfback Bill Mathis scoring a 4-yard touchdown behind blocking guard Dave Herman to give New York a 19–14 lead. The Raiders responded with an 80-yard drive that saw running back Charlie Smith score a touchdown on a 3-yard pass from Lamonica. The Raiders took a 22–19 lead on a two-point conversion with Lamonica completing the attempt to receiver Hewritt Dixon. During this drive, Hudson was ejected from the game after being called for a face mask penalty followed by a dispute with an official. As he left the field, he gave the jeering crowd the finger. The penalties caused the ball to be placed at the Jets' 3-yard line, and Smith scored for Oakland one play later.

The fourth quarter began with Smith fumbling the football with Oakland in scoring position. New York defensive end Gerry Philbin recovered the football at the Jets' 3-yard line, setting up a 97-yard drive consisting entirely of two Namath passes to Don Maynard, who was covered by Raiders' rookie cornerback George Atkinson. The 50-yard touchdown pass followed a 47-yard throw, and gave the Jets a 26–22 lead. Turner added another field goal to the Jets' total, giving them a 29–22 lead. The Raiders promptly responded with Lamonica orchestrating an 88-yard drive that ended with a 22-yard pass to receiver Fred Biletnikoff with less than four minutes remaining in the game, tying the contest.

I would have outrun Hudson, too. The play that was called back was a circle pattern, but teams were getting wise to that. So on the touchdown, I ran to the hash mark on the right side and then broke to the sideline. That play was open all day, but Daryle told me to be patient, that we would get to it. Our wide receivers ran deep patterns to clear out the secondary and then I just cut underneath.

— Raiders running back Charlie Smith

Turner made a 26-yard field goal to break the tie and give the Jets a three-point lead with a little over a minute remaining in the game. Turner kicked the ball off to the Raiders' Smith, who took the kick out of the end zone and to Oakland's own 22-yard line. Lamonica completed to Smith for an apparent touchdown, but the play was called back for a penalty, causing New York cornerback Johnny Sample to say to Lamonica, "Nice try, Lamonica. Better luck next year." On first down, Smith caught a 20-yard reception from Lamonica, while a 15-yard penalty was assessed against the Jets when a player grabbed Smith's facemask, moving the ball to the Jets' 43-yard line. On the ensuing play, Lamonica threw another pass to Smith who outpaced the ejected Hudson's replacement, Mike D'Amato, for a 43-yard touchdown. Kicker George Blanda made the extra point attempt which gave the Raiders a 36–32 lead.

With 42 seconds remaining, the Jets still had a chance to score; however, on the kickoff, New York return man Earl Christy fumbled the ball at the Jets' 12-yard line when he was tackled by Raiders linebacker Bill Budness. Oakland reserve running back Preston Ridlehuber picked up the fumble and ran into the end zone, with another Blanda extra point giving the Raiders a 43–32 lead, deflating any hopes of a Jets comeback. Ridlehuber could not remember whether AFL rules permitted advancing a fumbled kickoff return (they did), so he tried to make it appear he was entering the end zone with the same motion he gathered in the ball. Oakland kicked off to New York again, but the Jets could do little with the ball in the remaining time .

=== Decision to leave the game for Heidi ===
NBC's decision to air the movie Heidi at its advertised start time of 7 p.m. Eastern caused viewers in the eastern half of the U.S. to miss Oakland's last minute comeback to win the game.

The two starting quarterbacks combined for 31 incomplete passes, with the clock stopping on each incompletion, and the officials called 19 penalties, leading to more clock stoppages. Each team used all six of its allocated timeouts, and the many scores led to additional commercial breaks. At halftime, Connal called Cline, and without urgency discussed the fact that the game seemed to be running longer than expected.

As the fourth quarter began, it was 6:20 EST, and NBC executives began to realize the game might not end by 7:00. NBC Sports vice president Chet Simmons recalled:

They kept promoting Heidi, kept promoting Heidi. I kept looking at my watch, and I said to myself, there's no way to me that Heidi's going to make this at seven o'clock. Julian Goodman, the president of the company, told us going into the weekend that Heidi had to start on time ... I looked at my watch, looked at another table clock, looked at the game, and thought, no way is this going to happen.

Connal, watching the game from his home in Old Greenwich, Connecticut, also noticed the fourth quarter was running "terribly slow". At 6:45, he called Cline again, and both men agreed the game would not end on time. Both supported running the end of the game, but given Goodman's instructions, his permission was required. Connal agreed to call NBC Sports president Lindemann, and that he and Lindemann would then speak to Goodman. After promising Cline a return call, Connal reached Lindemann by telephone. Lindemann agreed that the end of the game should be broadcast, and both men began trying to reach Goodman. Lindemann was successful in reaching Goodman, and asked the network president, "What about the instruction to broadcast operations control that Heidi had to go on at 7 ET, no matter what?" Goodman replied, "That's crazy. It's a terrible idea." Lindemann then set up a three-way conversation with himself, Goodman and NBC Television president Don Durgin. After several minutes of discussion, Durgin agreed to delay the start of Heidi until after the game was completed. Sportswriter Kyle Garlett, in his history of sports gaffes, noted, "And even though earlier executives had told [Cline] to make sure he started Heidi on time, those same executives changed their minds late in the game."

Cline, watching the clock nervously, attempted to call Connal back, only to find both lines busy. He waited as long as he could, then made one final, unsuccessful attempt. Unknown to Cline, Connal was talking to Goodman, who had agreed to "slide the network", that is, start Heidi as soon as Gowdy and DeRogatis signed off from the game. Connal called the game producer, Ellis, in Oakland, to tell him the news, then called the BOC supervisor in Burbank – who, not knowing Connal, refused his order, and insisted on speaking with Goodman directly. As Goodman had disconnected to allow Connal to call Oakland, this could not be done.

Beginning at about 6:45, many viewers began calling NBC network and affiliate switchboards. Some demanded the game be shown to its conclusion; others wanted to know if Heidi would start on time. These calls jammed the switchboards, and even reportedly blew all of the fuses in them, preventing the executives from getting through to each other to resolve the situation. NBC protocol required an operations order from Connal, to countermand the midweek written orders, but Cline received no call from the increasingly desperate Connal, who was frustrated by the switchboard issues. Without such an order, and not knowing of Goodman's approval, Cline made the decision that Heidi would start on time. The television audience saw Smith return Turner's kickoff out of the end zone to the Oakland 22-yard line with 1:01 remaining. Burbank BOC played the closing football theme and gave the word cue, to the outraged shock of Ellis and Connal, and the connection was irretrievably broken. While viewers in the Pacific and Mountain Time Zones could watch the game to its conclusion, those in the Eastern and Central zones instead saw, after a commercial break and station identification, the start of Heidi, and were unaware that Oakland was scoring two touchdowns to win the game.

Oakland Tribune reporter Bob Valli reported on the Heidi Game: "Television missed one of football's most exciting and exhausting minutes of emotion. In that minute, Oakland fans saw despair turn to delirium."

== Reaction and aftermath ==
=== Viewer reaction ===
On realizing that NBC was switching away from the game, Goodman said to Lindemann by phone, "Where the hell has our football game gone?" During the station break which began with the network announcement, Goodman called a BOC phone to which only he knew the number and which was not part of NBC's Circle-7 exchange, a line that blew a fuse 26 times in an hour. When Cline answered it, Goodman ordered him to go back to the game. Although Cline knew there was no way to reconnect the feed, he promised to do the best he could. By the time the game ended at 7:07, thousands of viewers were calling the network to complain about missing the end of the football game. Others called newspapers, television stations, even the New York City Police Department, both to seek the final score and simply to vent. Humorist Art Buchwald wrote, "Men who wouldn't get out of their chairs in an earthquake rushed to the phone to scream obscenities [at the network]." As people learned of the outcome, some gamblers became upset because Ridlehuber's touchdown meant the Raiders had won by more than the point spread of 7 1/2, and bets thought to be won were now lost. In Oakland, Gowdy and DeRogatis left the broadcast booth to tell Ellis that the final two minutes were the most exciting that they had ever seen. Ellis replied, "It's too bad America didn't see it." Realizing that the original call had been lost, Ellis had the two sportscasters re-create their descriptions of the two Raider touchdowns on tape.

In an attempt to inform the audience of the game's outcome, NBC displayed the message "SPORTS BULLETIN: RAIDERS DEFEAT JETS 43–32" as an on-screen news update during the film. It did so during a scene just as Heidi's paralyzed cousin Clara was taking her first, slow steps.

"The football fans were indignant when they saw what they had missed. The Heidi audience was peeved at having an ambulatory football score intrude on one of the story's more touching moments. Short of pre-empting Heidi for a skin flick, NBC could not have managed to alienate more viewers that evening."

— Sportswriter Jack Clary

At 8:30, Goodman issued a statement apologizing for the incident, and stating that he had missed the ending of the game "as much as anybody". He stated that it was "a forgivable error committed by humans who were concerned about children expecting to see Heidi". The following morning, Cline was called into a meeting with his bosses. He was told that if he had done anything other than what he did, NBC would have been at the mercy of Timex and Cline would have been fired. The network turned the fiasco into an advantage by subsequent self-mockery, promoting the following week's Jets game telecast with an advertisement showing Namath with Heidi on his shoulders, and running another ad with testimonials about Heidi, the last: "I didn't get a chance to see it, but I hear it was great", signed by Namath. Other networks joined in: CBS commentator Harry Reasoner announced the "result" of the game: "Heidi married the goatherder". That same evening, NBC's own Huntley-Brinkley Report aired the tape of the game's final minute, complete with the re-created Gowdy/DeRogatis commentary. On the ABC Evening News, anchor Frank Reynolds read excerpts from Heidi while clips of the Raiders' two touchdowns were shown as cut-ins.

=== Ramifications ===
To prevent similar occurrences from happening in future game telecasts, a special "Heidi phone", a hotline connected to a different exchange and unaffected by switchboard meltdowns, was installed in BOC. The network quickly changed its procedures to allow games to finish before other programming begins, which is now standard practice. Three weeks after the Heidi Game, NBC aired a special presentation of Pinocchio (a live-action version starring Peter Noone, the lead singer of the rock band Herman's Hermits, in the title role). In the promotional newspaper advertisement for the film, Pinocchio himself assured football fans that they would view the entire game before the film and that he would sooner cut off his nose than "have them cut off" the action. A week later, on December 15, the nationally televised game between the Raiders and the San Diego Chargers ran over its allotted time slot. NBC started The New Adventures of Huckleberry Finn (the usual program airing at 7 p.m. EST) at 7:08 Eastern, and announced that all network programming that evening would be started eight minutes late. "I can't remember when we've done anything like this before", stated an NBC executive. "It's very unusual."

In subsequent television contracts, the merged NFL required language which obligated the networks to show games to completion in the road team's television market. Other major professional sports leagues in North America, the NCAA, and even the International Olympic Committee also shared the same rule in regards to their own respective television contracts. On November 23, 1975, NBC planned to air the heavily promoted children's film Willy Wonka & the Chocolate Factory at 7 p.m. Eastern, right after a game between the Raiders and Washington Redskins. When the game went into overtime, NBC stayed with it for almost 45 minutes to its ending and then joined the Wonka film in progress, prompting angry calls from parents.

Cline stated in 1989, "I wonder if this Heidi thing will ever die ... maybe now that it's past 20 years people will stop asking me about it." In 1997, the Heidi Game was voted among the ten most memorable games in pro football history, and the most memorable regular season contest. In 2005, TV Guide designated the Heidi Game at #6 on its list of the "100 Most Unexpected TV Moments" in history. Interviewed by the magazine, Jennifer Edwards, title star of Heidi, commented: "My gravestone is gonna say, 'She was a great moment in sports.'" In 2023, Edwards, introducing NBC Sunday Night Football's commemoration of the upcoming 55th anniversary of the Heidi Game prior to the Jets-Raiders game on November 12, quipped that "a movie I was in as a little girl kind of, how do I say this, got in the way of football". Namath jokingly responded in a tweet, "I never did like that little Heidi girl."

Cline summed up the events of the Heidi Game:

Everything had to be perfect. It was just a series of events that fit together. The game ran late, there was a lot of scoring; there were some injuries that stopped play. And if the Jets had won, there would not have been the to-do that was made. But the way they lost fanned the fires.

=== Game aftermath ===
The Jets were enraged by the outcome of the game, for reasons unrelated to the television problems, of which they were initially unaware. Feeling that Hudson's disqualification was unjustified (his replacement, D'Amato, was beaten for the winning touchdown), assistant coach Walt Michaels chased after the officials, and he and team doctor James Nicholas banged on the door of their dressing room, complaining bitterly. Ewbank mentioned the officiating in his postgame press conference. When told of Michaels' actions, the head coach ordered, "Get him out of there, it can only cost him money." Oakland coach Rauch told reporters, "There were so many turning points which kept putting both teams back in the game, it's impossible to discuss them all."

Ewbank learned of the television problems in the locker room when he received a telephone call from his wife congratulating him on a Jets victory – Lucy Ewbank assumed the fact that the end of the game was not shown meant New York had won. Her husband profanely informed her of the game result. She was not the only Jets relative deceived – cornerback Johnny Sample flew back east after the game on personal business, and when his father picked him up at Philadelphia International Airport, he congratulated his son on a Jets triumph.

Michaels accused Al Davis of getting the officials to inspect Turner's kicking shoes before a field goal attempt to see if they contained illegal metal plates, and called the Oakland team official "a man who has never contributed anything to football", to which Davis responded, "It's utterly ridiculous, unbelievable. It seems the Jets always lose to us because of penalties. But I like them and don't want any feud in case we visit New York December 29 [if both teams qualify for the AFL Championship Game]." The Jets left their white road uniforms in Oakland to be laundered and sent to them in San Diego, where they were to play their next game. The uniforms were not seen again once the team removed them in the Oakland locker room, and Jets management hastily ordered the green home uniforms, as well as the white uniforms the team had worn in the preseason, to be shipped from New York.

While in California, Michaels complained by phone to Mel Hein, AFL supervisor of officials, stating that an official had cursed at Hudson, provoking a response which led to Hudson's ejection. Jets officials also showed excerpts from the game films to the sportswriters from the New York papers who were assigned to cover the team. Zimmerman, who wrote for the New York Post, later stated, "I never saw such ferocity on a football field in my life," and remembered that the films showed Oakland defensive lineman Dan Birdwell punch Namath in the groin, causing him to remain on the ground for several minutes, though he did not have to leave the game. Birdwell's action was not penalized by the game officials. In early December, football Commissioner Pete Rozelle fined the Jets $2,000, Michaels $150, Hudson $200 (including a mandatory $50 fine for being ejected from the game), and Jets player John Elliott, also disqualified, $50; he had hit Oakland center Jim Otto. Rozelle criticized Ewbank and Michaels for their "extreme bad manners" while criticizing the officials and cited the Jets' screening of the game excerpts as a factor contributing to the team's fine. To avoid adverse fan reaction, the AFL reassigned field judge Frank Kirkland, whom Hudson had accused of using foul language, from the December 1 Jets game against the Miami Dolphins at Shea Stadium, to another game.

The Jets defeated San Diego 37–15 and clinched the AFL East four days later when the second-place Oilers lost to the Chiefs in a Thanksgiving Day game. The Raiders finished tied for the AFL West title with Kansas City; they then defeated the Chiefs in a tie-breaking playoff game. This set up a December 29 rematch between the Jets and Raiders in the AFL Championship.

The Jets hosted the Raiders at Shea Stadium on a windy December afternoon to determine who would play in Super Bowl III against the NFL champions, who proved to be the Baltimore Colts. The Jets defeated the Raiders, 27–23. Two weeks later, the Jets defeated the Colts in the Super Bowl. According to sportswriter Doyle Dietz, in the Jets' upset victory (the Colts were favored by as many as 19½ points), "the American Football League came of age". Madden later stated that the Jets' Super Bowl upset "was great for the history of the game, but a part of me has always felt that should have been [the Raiders] who were the first AFL team to do it ... [Super Bowl III] changed pro football. But I will always believe we would have beaten the Colts, too."

In 1988, Namath and Madden, by then both television analysts, were interviewed for the 20th anniversary of the Heidi Game. According to Madden, the Oakland victory in the Heidi Game "was kind of the start of the Raiders being a great team. One of the things we were doing was getting these fantastic come-from-behind things ... We didn't even know about the Heidi thing until we read about it the next day." Namath noted, "When I remember that game, it brings to mind the revenge factor we had against them going into the championship game. We paid them back then," to which Madden chuckled, "He's full of crap."

== Box score ==
1968 Week Eleven: New York Jets at Oakland Raiders—Game Summary

Quarter	1	2	3	4	Total
Jets	6	6	7	13	32
Raiders	7	7	8	21	43

at Oakland–Alameda County Coliseum, Oakland, California

- Date: November 17
- Game time: 1:00 p.m. PST
- Game weather: 62 °F (17 °C)
- Game attendance: 53,318
- Referee: Bob Finley
- TV announcers (NBC): Curt Gowdy and Al DeRogatis
- Boxscore

Game information

First quarter

- NYJ Jim Turner 44-yard FG
- NYJ Turner 18-yard FG
- OAK Warren Wells 9-yard pass from Lamonica (George Blanda kick)

Second quarter

- OAK Billy Cannon 48-yard pass from Lamonica (Blanda kick)
- NYJ Namath 1-yard run (pass failed)

Third quarter

- NYJ Bill Mathis 4-yard run (Turner kick)
- OAK Charlie Smith 3-yard run (Lamonica-Dixon pass)

Fourth quarter

- NYJ Maynard 50-yard pass from Namath (Turner kick)
- NYJ Turner 12-yard FG
- OAK Biletnikoff 22-yard pass from Lamonica (Blanda kick)
- NYJ Turner 26-yard FG
- OAK Smith 43-yard pass from Lamonica (Blanda kick)
- OAK Preston Ridlehuber 2-yard fumble return (Blanda kick)

Top passers

- NYJ – Joe Namath – 19/37, 381 YDS, TD
- OAK – Daryle Lamonica – 21/34, 311 YDS, 4 TD, 2 INT

Top rushers

- NYJ – Matt Snell – 21 CAR, 46 YDS
- OAK – Hewritt Dixon – 14 CAR, 75 YDS

Top receivers

- NYJ – Don Maynard – 10 REC, 228 YDS, TD
- OAK – Fred Biletnikoff – 7 REC, 120 YDS, TD

== See also ==
- NFL on television

== Bibliography ==
- Clary, Jack (1981). Pro Football's Great Moments (Updated ed.). New York: Bonanza Books. ISBN 978-0-517-34584-9.
- Davis, Jef f (2008). Rozelle, Czar of the NFL. New York: McGraw-Hill. ISBN 978-0-07-147166-4.
- Garlett, Kyle (2009). What Were They Thinking?: The Brainless Blunders That Changed Sports. New York: HarperCollins. pp. 175–178. ISBN 978-0-06-169992-4.
- Hanks, Stephen (1989). The Game That Changed Pro Football. New York: Carroll Publishing Group. ISBN 978-1-55972-012-0.
- LaMarre, Tom (2003). Stadium Stories: Oakland Raiders. Guilford, Connecticut: The Globe Pequot Press. ISBN 978-0-7627-2737-7.
- Maynard, Don; Shepatin, Matthew (2010). You Can't Catch Sunshine. Chicago: Triumph Books. ISBN 978-1-60078-375-3.
- Namath, Joe (2006). Namath (First ed.). New York: Rugged Land. ISBN 978-1-59071-081-4.
- Rappoport, Ken (2010). The Little League that Could: A History of the American Football League. Lanham, Maryland: Taylor Trade Publishing. ISBN 978-1-58979-463-4.
- Ryczek, William J. (2009). Crash of the Titans: The Early Years of the New York Jets and the AFL (Revised ed.). Jefferson, North Carolina: McFarland & Co. ISBN 978-0-7864-4126-6.
- Sahadi, Lou (1969). The Long Pass: The Inside Story of the New York Jets from the Terrible Titans to Broadway Joe Namath and the Championship of 1968. New York: The World Publishing Company. ISBN 978-1-58567-933-1.
- Strother, Sidney (1988). NFL Top 40: The Greatest Pro Football Games Ever Played. New York: Viking. ISBN 978-0-670-82490-8.
- Travers, Steven (2008). The Good, the Bad, and the Ugly Oakland Raiders: Heart-pounding, Jaw-dropping, and Gut-wrenching Moments from Oakland Raiders History. Chicago: Triumph Books. ISBN 978-1-57243-927-6.

=== Other sources ===
- "Oakland stops Houston, 40–7". The Altus Times-Democrat. Altus, Oklahoma. United Press International. January 1, 1968. p. 3 – via Google News.
- Anderson, Dave (December 10, 2000). "Sports of The Times; In A.F.L. Days, Jets-Raiders Was a Rivalry". The New York Times.
- Fox, Larry (December 3, 1968). "Rozelle fines Jets $2,000". Daily News. New York.
- "Jets shoot down Oakland, 27–14". The Modesto Bee. Associated Press. October 8, 1967. p. 1, Sports section – via Google News.
- "Hot and cold streaks on the line". The New York Times. November 16, 1968.
- "Oakland jinx hits Jets: Even uniforms are lost". The New York Times. November 23, 1968.
- "Timeline – Raiders Historical Highlights". Oakland Raiders. Archived from the original on September 2, 2011.
- "Oilers plan no change in offense". Pittsburgh Post-Gazette. Associated Press. December 30, 1967 – via Google News.
- Schuster, Joe (November 17, 1988). "Twenty years later, NBC's Heidi game remembered". USA Today.
- Schuster, Joe (March 1993). "Great Games: Jets vs. Raiders, 1968". Sport. pp. 22–23.
- "Raiders recall Heidi win when last they met Jets". The Spokesman-Review. Spokane, Washington. Associated Press. December 25, 1968. p. 15.
- "Huck Finn, etc., yield to grid". St. Petersburg Times. Associated Press. December 16, 1968. p. 1–C – via Google News.
- Usher, George (November 19, 1968). "Bitter Oakland taste still choking Michaels". Newsday.
- Usher, George (December 4, 1968). "Jets' letter provokes 2,000 guesses". Newsday.
- Valli, Bob (November 16, 1967). "Not like '67: Jets Winging". Oakland Tribune. pp. 13–18.
- Valli, Bob (November 18, 1968). "That clutch Raiders win". Oakland Tribune. pp. 33, 39.
- Wallace, William N. (August 25, 1968). "Rams, Raiders Powerful; Rams and Raiders Lead Pro Teams". The New York Times. p. S1.
- Zimmerman, Paul (August 13, 1976). "Heidi, Ben, Warren and memories". Pro! (Oakland ed.). NFL Properties.
