= 1970 Oakland Raiders season =

NFL team season

- Owner: F. Wayne Valley
- General manager: Al Davis
- Head coach: John Madden
- Home stadium: Oakland–Alameda County Coliseum

Results
- Record: 8–4–2
- Division place: 1st AFC West
- Playoffs: Won Divisional Playoffs (vs. Dolphins) 21–14; Lost AFC Championship (at Colts) 17–27

The 1970 Oakland Raiders season was the team's 11th season in Oakland. It was also their first season as members of the NFL. The Raiders would ultimately win their fourth consecutive division title (as well as their first AFC West title). They advanced to the AFC Championship Game, where they lost to the Baltimore Colts.

The Raiders' 1970 season is best remembered for a series of clutch performances by veteran placekicker/quarterback George Blanda. Blanda, despite being cut during the 1970 preseason, eventually re-joined the Raiders' roster. His ensuing season (the twenty-first of his professional career) ranked as one of the more dramatic comebacks in sports history. Over a span of five consecutive games, Blanda came off the bench to spark a series of dramatic rallies. The Raiders went an impressive 4–0–1 over this span.

Blanda's five-game "streak" began on October 25, 1970. In a home game against the Pittsburgh Steelers, Blanda threw for two touchdowns in relief of an injured Daryle Lamonica. One week later, his 48-yard field goal (with three seconds remaining on the clock) salvaged a 17–17 tie with the defending Super Bowl Champion Kansas City Chiefs. One week later, on November 8, Blanda came off the bench against the Cleveland Browns. His late touchdown pass (with 1:34 remaining in the game) tied the game at 20–20. He ultimately kicked a 53-yard field goal, as time expired, to give the Raiders a stunning 23–20 victory. The following week, against the Denver Broncos, Blanda again replaced Lamonica in the fourth quarter. His touchdown pass to Fred Biletnikoff, with 2:28 left in the game, gave the Raiders an unlikely 24–19 win. The incredible streak concluded one week later against the San Diego Chargers. The Raiders managed to drive deep into Chargers territory in the game's final seconds. Blanda's last-minute 16-yard field goal sealed a dramatic 20–17 triumph.

Blanda's streak played a huge role in the Raiders' 1970 division title, as the team went a mediocre 4–4–1 in "non-streak" games. Indeed, their final record of 8–4–2 (itself a four-win drop from a 12–1–1 finish in 1969) placed them only one game ahead of the Chiefs at season's end. Oakland had a poorer record than two NFC teams which failed to make the playoffs, the Rams (9-4-1) and Giants (9-5).

The Raiders ultimately advanced to the 1970 AFC Championship Game, where they met the heavily favored 11–2–1 Baltimore Colts. During this game, Blanda again came off the bench in relief of an injured Lamonica. Blanda's solid play (17 of 32 passes for 217 yards, two touchdowns, and a 48-yard field goal) kept the Raiders in the game until the final quarter, when he was intercepted twice. At age 43, Blanda became the oldest quarterback to ever play in a championship game.

Blanda's eye-opening achievements resulted in his winning the Bert Bell Award. Chiefs' owner Lamar Hunt quipped that "...this George Blanda is as good as his father, who used to play for Houston." While he never again played a major role at quarterback, Blanda served as the Raiders' kicker for five more seasons.

== Offseason ==
=== Draft ===
1970 Oakland Raiders draft
Round	Pick	Player	Position	College	Notes
1	24	Raymond Chester *	TE	Morgan State	
2	50	Ted Koy	TE	Texas	
Made roster † Pro Football Hall of Fame * Made at least one Pro Bowl during career

== Personnel ==
=== Staff / Coaches ===
1970 Oakland Raiders staff
Front office: Majority Co-Owner - F. Wayne Valley; Minority Co-Owner/General Manager - Al Davis; Minority Co-Owner - Ed McGah; President of the General Partner / General Manager – Al Davis; Senior Executive – John Herrera; Scout/ Executive Assistant, Personnel Director - Ken Herock; Head coaches: Head Coach – John Madden; Offensive coaches: Offensive Backs – John Polonchek; Ends Coach – Dick Wood; Offensive line – Ollie Spencer	Defensive coaches: Defensive Line – Tom Dahms; Linebackers – Sid Hall; Defensive Backfield – Richie McCabe; Special teams coaches: Special teams – John Rauch; Strength and conditioning: Strength and Conditioning - Marv Marinovich

=== Roster ===
1970 Oakland Raiders roster
Quarterbacks (QB): 16 George Blanda K; 3 Daryle Lamonica; 12 Ken Stabler; Running backs (RB): 40 Pete Banaszak; 35 Hewritt Dixon; 32 Don Highsmith; 44 Marv Hubbard; 23 Charlie Smith; Wide receivers (WR): 25 Fred Biletnikoff; 89 Drew Buie; 13 Rod Sherman; 81 Warren Wells; Tight ends (TE): 87 Raymond Chester; 38 Ted Koy	Offensive linemen (OL): 64 George Buehler G; 70 Jim Harvey G; 00 Jim Otto C; 79 Harry Schuh T; 78 Art Shell T; 76 Bob Svihus T; 63 Gene Upshaw G; Defensive linemen (DL): 84 Tony Cline DE; 83 Ben Davidson DE; 71 Al Dotson DT; 74 Tom Keating DT; 85 Carleton Oats DT; 80 Art Thoms DT	Linebackers (LB): 50 Duane Benson OLB; 48 Bill Budness MLB; 55 Dan Conners MLB; 86 Gerald Irons OLB; 42 Bill Laskey OLB; 34 Gus Otto OLB; Defensive backs (DB): 43 George Atkinson SS; 24 Willie Brown CB; 45 Dave Grayson FS; 47 Kent McCloughan CB; 20 Jimmy Warren CB; 26 Nemiah Wilson CB; Special teams (ST): 11 Mike Eischeid P	Practice squad: 10 Eldridge Dickey WR; 65 Wayne Hawkins G; 38 Jacque MacKinnon TE; 67 Harold Rice DE; 22 Larry Todd RB; 49 Carl Weathers LB; 41 Alvin Wyatt CB; Reserve: 36 Lloyd Edwards TE (IR); Rookies in italics

== Regular season ==
=== Schedule ===
Week	Date	Opponent	Result	Record	Venue	Attendance	Recap
1	September 20	at Cincinnati Bengals	**L** 21–31	0–1	Riverfront Stadium	56,616	Recap
2	September 27	at **San Diego Chargers**	**T** 27–27	0–1–1	San Diego Stadium	42,109	Recap
3	October 3	at Miami Dolphins	**L** 13–20	0–2–1	Miami Orange Bowl	57,140	Recap
4	October 11	**Denver Broncos**	**W** 35–23	1–2–1	Oakland–Alameda County Coliseum	54,436	Recap
5	October 19	Washington Redskins	**W** 34–20	2–2–1	Oakland–Alameda County Coliseum	54,471	Recap
6	October 25	Pittsburgh Steelers	**W** 31–14	3–2–1	Oakland–Alameda County Coliseum	54,423	Recap
7	November 1	at **Kansas City Chiefs**	**T** 17–17	3–2–2	Municipal Stadium	51,334	Recap
8	November 8	Cleveland Browns	**W** 23–20	4–2–2	Oakland–Alameda County Coliseum	54,463	Recap
9	November 15	at **Denver Broncos**	**W** 24–19	5–2–2	Mile High Stadium	50,959	Recap
10	November 22	**San Diego Chargers**	**W** 20–17	6–2–2	Oakland–Alameda County Coliseum	54,594	Recap
11	November 26	at Detroit Lions	**L** 14–28	6–3–2	Tiger Stadium	56,597	Recap
12	December 6	at New York Jets	**W** 14–13	7–3–2	Shea Stadium	62,905	Recap
13	December 12	**Kansas City Chiefs**	**W** 20–6	8–3–2	Oakland–Alameda County Coliseum	54,596	Recap
14	December 20	San Francisco 49ers	**L** 7–38	8–4–2	Oakland–Alameda County Coliseum	54,535	Recap
Note: Intra-division opponents are in **bold** text.

=== Game summaries ===
==== Week 1 at Bengals ====
Week One: Oakland Raiders (0–0) at Cincinnati Bengals (0–0)

Quarter	1	2	3	4	Total
Raiders	7	0	14	0	**21**
**Bengals**	7	7	14	3	**31**

at Riverfront Stadium, Cincinnati, Ohio

- Date: September 20, 1970
- Game time: 1:00 p.m.
- Game weather: 74 °F (23 °C)
- Game attendance: 56,616
- Referee: Jim Tunney
- Pro-Football-Reference.com

Game information

**First quarter**

- CIN – Sam Wyche 5-yard run (Horst Muhlmann kick). Bengals 7–0. Drive:
- OAK – Fred Biletnikoff 20-yard pass from Daryle Lamonica (George Blanda kick). Tie 7–7. Drive:

**Second quarter**

- CIN – Essex Johnson 51-yard pass from Sam Wyche (Horst Muhlmann kick). Bengals 14–7. Drive:

**Third quarter**

- CIN – Paul Robinson 3-yard run (Horst Muhlmann kick). Bengals 21–7. Drive:
- OAK – Fred Biletnikoff 18-yard pass from Daryle Lamonica (George Blanda kick). Bengals 21–14. Drive:
- OAK – Alvin Wyatt 63-yard punt return (George Blanda kick). Tie 21–21.
- CIN – Jess Phillips 76-yard run (Horst Muhlmann kick). Bengals 28–21. Drive:

**Fourth quarter**

- CIN – Horst Muhlmann 38-yard field goal. Bengals 31–21. Drive:

Top passers

- OAK – Daryle Lamonica – 17/36, 265 yards, 2 TD, 2 INT
- CIN – Sam Wyche – 8/18, 147 yards, TD

Top rushers

- OAK – Charlie Smith – 8 rushes, 29 yards
- CIN – Jess Phillips – 15 rushes, 130 yards, TD

Top receivers

- OAK – Fred Biletnikoff – 6 receptions, 113 yards, 2 TD
- CIN – Bob Trumpy – 4 receptions, 67 yards

==== Week 4 vs Broncos ====
Week Four: Denver Broncos at Oakland Raiders

Quarter	1	2	3	4	Total
Broncos	10	7	6	0	**23**
Raiders	7	14	0	14	**35**

at Oakland–Alameda County Coliseum, Oakland, California

- Date: October 11
- Game weather: 60 °F (16 °C)
- Referee: John McDonough
- Box Score

Game information

**First quarter**

- DEN – Bobby Howfield 23 yard field goal. Broncos 3–0. Drive:
- OAK – Raymond Chester 24 yard pass from Daryle Lamonica (George Blanda kick). Raiders 7–3. Drive:
- DEN – Floyd Little 54 yard run (Bobby Howfield kick). Broncos 10–7. Drive:

**Second quarter**

- DEN – Mike Haffner 28 yard pass from Pete Liske (Bobby Howfield kick). Broncos 17–7. Drive:
- OAK – Warren Wells 32 yard pass from Daryle Lamonica (George Blanda kick). Broncos 17–14. Drive:
- OAK – Warren Wells 60 yard pass from Daryle Lamonica (George Blanda kick). Raiders 21–17. Drive:

**Third quarter**

- DEN – Bobby Howfield 47 yard field goal. Raiders 21–20. Drive:
- DEN – Bobby Howfield 34 yard field goal. Broncos 23–21. Drive:

**Fourth quarter**

- OAK – Warren Wells 20 yard pass from Daryle Lamonica (George Blanda kick). Raiders 28–23. Drive:
- OAK – Charlie Smith 5 yard run (George Blanda kick). Raiders 35–23. Drive:

Top passers

- DEN
- OAK – Daryle Lamonica – 20/37, 364 yards, 4 TD, INT

Top rushers

- DEN
- OAK

Top receivers

- DEN
- OAK – Warren Wells – 7 receptions, 198 yards, 3 TD

==== Week 5 ====
Team	1	2	3	4	Total
Redskins	3	10	0	7	20
• Raiders	14	6	14	0	34

- Date: October 19
- Location: Oakland–Alameda County Coliseum, Oakland, California
- Game start: 9:00 p.m.
- Game weather: 58 °F (14 °C); wind 6 mph (9.7 km/h)
- Referee: Jack Reader
- TV announcers (ABC): Keith Jackson, Howard Cosell and Don Meredith

Scoring summary
Q1	OAK	Dixon 39 yard run (Blanda kick)	OAK 7–0
Q1	OAK	Wells 28 yard pass from Lamonica (Blanda kick)	OAK 14–0
Q1	WSH	Knight 14 yard field goal	OAK 14–3
Q2	OAK	Blanda 35 yard field goal	OAK 17–3
Q2	WSH	Knight 34 yard field goal	OAK 17–6
Q2	WSH	Taylor 39 yard pass from Jurgensen (Knight kick)	OAK 17–13
Q2	OAK	Blanda 21 yard field goal	OAK 20–13
Q3	OAK	Wells 24 yard pass from Lamonica (Blanda kick)	OAK 27–13
Q3	OAK	Smith 16 yard pass from Lamonica (Blanda kick)	OAK 34–13
Q4	WSH	Smith 23 yard pass from Jurgensen (Knight kick)	OAK 34–20

==== Week 6 ====
Team	1	2	3	4	Total
Steelers	0	7	7	0	14
• **Raiders**	7	17	7	0	31

- Date: October 25
- Location: Oakland–Alameda County Coliseum • Oakland, California
- Game start: 1:00 p.m.
- Game weather: 55 °F (13 °C) • Wind 8 mph (13 km/h)
- Referee: Norm Schachter

Scoring summary
1	OAK	Raymond Chester 37-yard pass from Daryle Lamonica (George Blanda kick)	Raiders 7–0
2	PIT	Preston Pearson 2-yard run (Gene Mingo kick)	Tie 7–7
2	OAK	Warren Wells 44-yard pass from George Blanda (George Blanda kick)	Raiders 14–7
2	OAK	George Blanda 27-yard field goal	Raiders 17–7
2	OAK	Raymond Chester 19-yard pass from George Blanda (George Blanda kick)	Raiders 24–7
3	PIT	Dennis Hughes 12-yard pass from Terry Bradshaw (Gene Mingo kick)	Raiders 24–14
3	OAK	Raymond Chester 34-yard pass from George Blanda (George Blanda kick)	Raiders 31–14

==== Week 7 at Chiefs ====
Week Seven: Oakland Raiders (3–2–1) at Kansas City Chiefs (3–3)

Quarter	1	2	3	4	Total
Raiders	0	7	7	3	**17**
Chiefs	0	7	3	7	**17**

at Kansas City Municipal Stadium, Kansas City, Missouri

- Date: November 1
- Game time: 3:00 p.m. CST
- Game weather: 40 °F (4 °C)
- Game attendance: 51,334
- Referee: Bob Finley
- Box Score

Game information

**First quarter**

- No scoring

**Second quarter**

- KC – Wendell Hayes 4-yard run (Jan Stenerud kick). Chiefs 7–0. Drive:
- OAK – Raymond Chester 3-yard pass from Daryle Lamonica (George Blanda kick). Tie 7–7. Drive:

**Third quarter**

- OAK – Raymond Chester 8-yard pass from Daryle Lamonica (George Blanda kick). Raiders 14–7. Drive:
- KC – Jan Stenerud 33-yard field goal. Raiders 14–10. Drive:

**Fourth quarter**

- KC – Otis Taylor 13-yard pass from Len Dawson (Jan Stenerud kick). Chiefs 17–14. Drive:
- OAK – George Blanda 40-yard field goal. Tie 17–17. Drive:

Top passers

- OAK – Daryle Lamonica – 13/28, 125 yards, 2 TD
- KC – Len Dawson – 8/14, 174 yards, TD, INT

Top rushers

- OAK – Marv Hubbard – 18 rushes, 98 yards
- KC – Ed Podolak – 19 rushes, 108 yards

Top receivers

- OAK – Fred Biletnikoff/Warren Wells – 2 receptions, 33 yards
- KC – Otis Taylor – 4 receptions, 129 yards, TD

Ben Davidson speared Len Dawson causing a massive brawl between the two teams.

==== Week 8 ====
Team	1	2	3	4	Total
Browns	0	10	7	3	20
• **Raiders**	3	10	0	10	23

- Date: November 8
- Location: Oakland–Alameda County Coliseum • Oakland, California
- Game start: 1:00 p.m.
- Game weather: 60 °F (16 °C) • Wind 5 mph (8.0 km/h)
- Referee: Jack Vest

Scoring summary
1	OAK	George Blanda 43-yard field goal	Raiders 3–0
2	OAK	Charlie Smith 27-yard pass from Daryle Lamonica (George Blanda kick)	Raiders 10–0
2	OAK	George Blanda 9-yard field goal	Raiders 13–0
2	CLE	Leroy Kelly 10-yard pass from Bill Nelsen (Don Cockroft kick)	Raiders 13–7
2	CLE	Don Cockroft 42-yard field goal	Raiders 13–10
3	CLE	Bo Scott 63-yard run (Don Cockroft kick)	Browns 17–13
4	CLE	Don Cockroft 32-yard field goal	Browns 20–13
4	OAK	Warren Wells 14-yard pass from George Blanda (George Blanda kick)	Tie 20–20
4	OAK	George Blanda 52-yard field goal	Raiders 23–20

=== Standings ===
AFC West
	W	L	T	PCT	DIV	CONF	PF	PA	STK
Oakland Raiders	8	4	2	.667	4-0-2	7-2-2	300	293	L1
Kansas City Chiefs	7	5	2	.583	2–3–1	7–3–1	272	244	L2
San Diego Chargers	5	6	3	.455	2–2–2	4–4–3	282	278	W1
Denver Broncos	5	8	1	.385	1–4–1	3–6–1	253	264	L1

Note: Tie games were not officially counted in the standings until 1972.

== Playoffs ==
=== AFC Divisional Playoffs ===
Quarter	1	2	3	4	Total
Dolphins	0	7	0	7	14
Raiders	0	7	7	7	21

at Oakland–Alameda County Coliseum, Oakland, California

- Date: December 27
- Game time: 4:00 p.m. EST/1:00 p.m. PST
- Game weather: 45 F, wind 8 mph (13 km/h)
- Game attendance: 52,594
- Referee: John McDonough
- TV announcers (NBC): Curt Gowdy and Kyle Rote
- Box Score

Game information

Second quarter

- MIA – Paul Warfield 16-yard pass from Bob Griese (Garo Yepremian kick)
- OAK – Fred Biletnikoff 22-yard pass from Daryle Lamonica (George Blanda kick)

Third quarter

- OAK – Willie Brown 50-yard interception return (George Blanda kick)

Fourth quarter

- OAK – Rod Sherman 82-yard pass from Daryle Lamonica (George Blanda kick)
- MIA – Willie Richardson 7-yard pass from Bob Griese (Garo Yepremian kick)

Passing

- MIA – Bob Griese 13/27, 155 yards, 2 TD, INT
- OAK – Daryle Lamonica 8/16, 187 yards, 2 TD

Rushing

- MIA – Jim Kiick 14 att, 64 yards
- OAK – Marv Hubbard 18 att, 58 yards

Receiving

- MIA – Paul Warfield 4 rec, 64 yards, TD
- OAK – Rod Sherman 1 rec, 82 yards, TD

=== AFC Championship Game ===
Quarter	1	2	3	4	Total
Raiders	0	3	7	7	17
Colts	3	7	10	7	27

at Memorial Stadium, Baltimore, Maryland

- Date: January 3
- Game time: 2:00 p.m. EST
- Game weather: 34 F, wind 6 mph (9.7 km/h)
- Game attendance: 54,799
- Referee: Ben Dreith
- TV announcers (NBC): Curt Gowdy and Kyle Rote
- Box Score

Game information

First quarter

- BAL – Jim O'Brien 16-yard field goal

Second quarter

- BAL – Norm Bulaich 2-yard run (Jim O'Brien kick)
- OAK – George Blanda 48-yard field goal

Third quarter

- OAK – Fred Biletnikoff 38-yard pass from George Blanda (George Blanda kick)
- BAL – Jim O'Brien 23-yard field goal
- BAL – Norm Bulaich 11-yard run (Jim O'Brien kick)

Fourth quarter

- OAK – Warren Wells 15-yard pass from George Blanda (George Blanda kick)
- BAL – Ray Perkins 68-yard pass from Johnny Unitas (Jim O'Brien kick)

Passing

- OAK – George Blanda 17/32, 271 yards, 2 TD, 3 INT
- BAL – Johnny Unitas 11/30, 245 yards, TD

Rushing

- OAK – Hewritt Dixon 10 att, 51 yards
- BAL – Norm Bulaich 22 att, 71 yards, 2 TD

Receiving

- OAK – Warren Wells 5 rec, 108 yards, TD
- BAL – Eddie Hinton 5 rec, 115 yards

== Awards and honors ==
- George Blanda, Associated Press Athlete of the Year
- George Blanda, Bert Bell Award
