= 1968 Oakland Raiders season =

AFL team season

- Owner: F. Wayne Valley
- General manager: Al Davis
- Head coach: John Rauch
- Home stadium: Oakland–Alameda County Coliseum

Results
- Record: 12–2
- Division place: 1st AFL Western
- Playoffs: Won Divisional Playoffs (vs. Chiefs) 41–6; Lost AFL Championship (at Jets) 23–27

The 1968 Oakland Raiders season was the Raiders' ninth season in both Oakland and the American Football League. It saw the team try to improve upon its 13–1 record from 1967. They ultimately finished one game short of matching that year's result; their 12–2 finish still ensured that they would lead the league in wins for a second consecutive year. Led by third-year head coach John Rauch, they tied with Kansas City for the division title, which was settled by an unscheduled tiebreaker playoff, won 41–6 by the Raiders in Oakland.

The season featured a growing rivalry between the Raiders and the New York Jets, led by fourth-year superstar quarterback Joe Namath. The teams met twice in 1968: the first was on November 17 in Oakland, which saw the Raiders complete a stunning fourth-quarter comeback over the Jets, scoring two touchdowns in nine seconds. Known today as the Heidi Game, it remains one of the most famous in AFL/NFL history. They paired up six weeks later in the AFL Championship Game in New York, where Namath's Jets emerged victorious in a 27–23 upset on December 29. Two weeks later, the Jets upset the Baltimore Colts in Super Bowl III.

The 1968 season is also notable for a few changes to the team including the additions of George Atkinson, Art Shell, and Ken Stabler. All three won a championship with the Raiders eight years later in Super Bowl XI. Additionally, Shell in 1989, and Stabler in 2016, were both inducted into the Pro Football Hall of Fame.

== Offseason ==
=== NFL/AFL draft ===
1968 Oakland Raiders draft
Round	Pick	Player	Position	College	Notes
2	52	Ken Stabler * ^{†}	QB	Alabama	
3	80	Art Shell * ^{†}	T	Maryland Eastern Shore	
Made roster † Pro Football Hall of Fame * Made at least one Pro Bowl during career

== Personnel ==
=== Staff / Coaches ===
1968 Oakland Raiders staff
Front office: Majority Co-Owner - F. Wayne Valley; Minority Co-Owner/General Manager - Al Davis; Minority Co-Owner: Ed McGah; President of the General Partner / General Manager – Al Davis; Senior Executive – John Herrera; Head coaches: Head coach – John Rauch; Offensive coaches: Offensive Backs – John Polonchek; Tight ends – Bill Meyers; Offensive line – Ollie Spencer	Defensive coaches: Defensive line – Tom Dahms; Linebackers – John Madden; Defensive backs – Charlie Sumner; Special teams coaches: Special teams – John Rauch; Kicking – Bugsy Engelberg; Strength and conditioning: Strength and Conditioning - Marv Marinovich

=== Roster ===
1968 Oakland Raiders roster
Quarterbacks (QB): 16 George Blanda K; 19 Cotton Davidson; 3 Daryle Lamonica; 12 Ken Stabler; Running backs (RB): 40 Pete Banaszak; 35 Hewritt Dixon; 30 Roger Hagberg; 37 Preston Ridlehuber; 23 Charlie Smith; Wide receivers (WR): 25 Fred Biletnikoff; 10 Eldridge Dickey; 82 John Eason; 89 Bill Miller; 41 John Roderick; 81 Warren Wells; Tight ends (TE): 33 Billy Cannon; 88 Dave Kocourek	Offensive linemen (OL): 70 Jim Harvey G; 65 Wayne Hawkins G; 62 Bob Kruse C; 00 Jim Otto C; 79 Harry Schuh T; 78 Art Shell T; 76 Bob Svihus T; 63 Gene Upshaw G; Defensive linemen (DL): 53 Dan Birdwell DT; 83 Ben Davidson DE; 71 Al Dotson DT; 77 Ike Lassiter DE; 85 Carleton Oats DT; 80 Karl Rubke DE	Linebackers (LB): 50 Duane Benson OLB; 48 Bill Budness MLB; 55 Dan Conners MLB; 86 Bill Fairband OLB; 52 Jerry Hopkins OLB; 61 Dave Ogas OLB; 56 Chip Oliver OLB; 34 Gus Otto OLB; Defensive backs (DB): 43 George Atkinson CB; 21 Rodger Bird SS; 24 Willie Brown CB; 45 Dave Grayson FS; 47 Kent McCloughan CB; 49 Dave Morrison CB; 20 Warren Powers SS; 29 Howie Williams SS; 26 Nemiah Wilson CB; Special teams (ST): 11 Mike Eischeid P	Reserve: 74 Tom Keating DT (IR); 42 Bill Laskey LB (IR); 22 Larry Todd RB (IR); -- Charley Warner CB (IR); Rookies in italics

== Schedule ==
Week	Date	Opponent	Result	Record	Venue	Attendance	Recap
1	Bye						
2	September 15	at Buffalo Bills	**W** 48–6	1–0	War Memorial Stadium	43,057	Recap
3	September 21	at Miami Dolphins	**W** 47–21	2–0	Miami Orange Bowl	30,021	Recap
4	September 29	at Houston Oilers	**W** 24–15	3–0	Houston Astrodome	46,098	Recap
5	October 6	Boston Patriots	**W** 41–10	4–0	Oakland–Alameda County Coliseum	44,253	Recap
6	October 13	**San Diego Chargers**	**L** 14–23	4–1	Oakland–Alameda County Coliseum	53,257	Recap
7	October 20	at **Kansas City Chiefs**	**L** 10–24	4–2	Municipal Stadium	50,015	Recap
8	October 27	**Cincinnati Bengals**	**W** 31–10	5–2	Oakland–Alameda County Coliseum	37,083	Recap
9	November 3	**Kansas City Chiefs**	**W** 38–21	6–2	Oakland–Alameda County Coliseum	53,357	Recap
10	November 10	at **Denver Broncos**	**W** 43–7	7–2	Mile High Stadium	50,002	Recap
11	November 17	New York Jets	**W** 43–32	8–2	Oakland–Alameda County Coliseum	53,118	Recap
12	November 24	at **Cincinnati Bengals**	**W** 34–0	9–2	Nippert Stadium	27,116	Recap
13	November 28	Buffalo Bills	**W** 13–10	10–2	Oakland–Alameda County Coliseum	39,883	Recap
14	December 8	**Denver Broncos**	**W** 33–27	11–2	Oakland–Alameda County Coliseum	47,754	Recap
15	December 15	at **San Diego Chargers**	**W** 34–27	12–2	San Diego Stadium	40,698	Recap
Note: Intra-division opponents are in **bold** text.

- Saturday night (September 21), Thursday (November 28: Thanksgiving)

== Postseason ==
Round	Date	Opponent	Result	Venue	Attendance	Recap
Divisional	December 22	Kansas City Chiefs	W 41–6	Oakland–Alameda County Coliseum	53,357	Recap
AFL Championship	December 29	at New York Jets	L 23–27	Shea Stadium	62,627	Recap

== Standings ==
AFL Western Division
	W	L	T	PCT	DIV	PF	PA	STK
Oakland Raiders	12	2	0	.857	6–2	453	233	W8
Kansas City Chiefs	12	2	0	.857	7–1	371	170	W5
San Diego Chargers	9	5	0	.643	5–3	382	310	L2
Denver Broncos	5	9	0	.357	1–7	255	404	L3
Cincinnati Bengals	3	11	0	.214	1–7	215	329	L3

Note: Tie games were not officially counted in the standings in the AFL.

== Game summaries ==
=== Week 11 vs. Jets ===
New York Jets (7–2) at Oakland Raiders (7–2)

Quarter	1	2	3	4	Total
Jets	6	6	7	13	32
Raiders	7	7	8	21	43

at Oakland-Alameda County Coliseum • Oakland, California

- Date: November 17
- Game time: 1:00 p.m. PST
- Game weather: 60 °F (16 °C) • Wind —
- Game attendance: 53,318
- Referee: Bob Finley
- TV announcers (NBC): Curt Gowdy and Kyle Rote
- Pro-Football-Reference.com, Pro Football Hall of Fame

Game information

Jets

- Joe Namath
  19/37, 381 Yds, TD
- Matt Snell
  21 Rush, 46 Yds
- Don Maynard
  10 Rec, 228 Yds, TD

Raiders

- Daryle Lamonica
  21/34, 311 Yds, 4 TD, 2 INT
- Hewritt Dixon
  4 Rush, 75 Yds
- Fred Biletnikoff
  7 Rec, 120 Yds, TD

Scoring summary

Quarter	Time	Drive			Team	Scoring information	Score	
Quarter	Time	Plays	Yards	TOP	Team	Scoring information	NYJ	OAK
1	7:42				Jets	44-yard field goal by Turner	3	0
1	5:23				Jets	18-yard field goal by Turner	6	0
1	2:32				Raiders	Wells 9-yard touchdown reception from Lamonica, Blanda kick good	6	7
2	13:34				Raiders	Cannon 48-yard touchdown reception from Lamonica, Blanda kick good	6	14
2	0:05				Jets	Namath 1-yard touchdown run, 2-point pass failed	12	14
3	9:59				Jets	Mathis 4-yard touchdown run, Turner kick good	19	14
3	1:46				Raiders	Smith 3-yard touchdown run, 2-point pass good	19	22
4	14:15				Jets	Maynard 50-yard touchdown reception from Namath, Turner kick good	26	22
4	8:49				Jets	12-yard field goal by Turner	29	22
4	3:10				Raiders	Biletnikoff 22-yard touchdown reception from Lamonica, Blanda kick good	29	29
4	1:05				Jets	26-yard field goal by Turner	32	29
4	0:42				Raiders	Smith 43-yard touchdown reception from Lamonica, Blanda kick good	32	36
4	0:33				Raiders	Fumble recovery returned 2 yards for touchdown by Ridlehuber, Blanda kick good	32	43
"TOP" = time of possession. For other American football terms, see Glossary of American football.							32	43

=== Week 12 vs. Bills ===
Buffalo Bills (1–10–1) at Oakland Raiders (9–2)

Quarter	1	2	3	4	Total
Bills	0	3	0	7	10
Raiders	0	3	10	0	13

at Oakland-Alameda County Coliseum • Oakland, California

- Date: November 28, Thanksgiving Day
- Game time: 1:00 p.m. PST
- Game weather: 54 °F (12 °C) • Wind 5 mph (8 km/h)
- Game attendance: 39,883
- TV: NBC
- Pro-Football-Reference.com

Game information

Bills

- Ed Rutkowski
  10/25, 160 Yds, 2 INT
- Max Anderson
  11 Rush, 60 Yds, TD
  2 Rec, 31 Yds

Raiders

- Daryle Lamonica
  12/32, 145 Yds, INT
- Charlie Smith
  12 Rush, 54 Yds
- Warren Wells
  3 Rec, 61 Yds

Scoring summary

Quarter	Time	Drive			Team	Scoring information	Score	
Quarter	Time	Plays	Yards	TOP	Team	Scoring information	BUF	OAK
2					Raiders	39-yard field goal by Blanda	0	3
2					Bills	26-yard field goal by Alford	3	3
3					Raiders	33-yard field goal by Blanda	3	6
3					Raiders	Interception returned 33 yards for touchdown by Atkinson, Blanda kick good	3	13
4					Bills	Anderson 5-yard touchdown run, Alford kick good	10	13
"TOP" = time of possession. For other American football terms, see Glossary of American football.							10	13
