= Jack Gehrke =

American football player (born 1946)

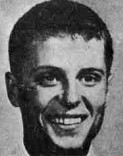

No. 17, 26, 40
- Position: Wide receiver

Personal information
- Born: January 14, 1946 (age 80); Salt Lake City, Utah, U.S.
- Listed height: 6 ft 0 in (1.83 m)
- Listed weight: 178 lb (81 kg)

Career information
- High school: South (Salt Lake City)
- College: Utah
- NFL draft: 1968: 10th round, 265th overall pick

Career history
- Kansas City Chiefs (1968); Cincinnati Bengals (1969); Denver Broncos (1971)

Career NFL/AFL statistics
- Receptions: 14
- Receiving yards: 254
- Stats at Pro Football Reference

Jack Gehrke (born January 14, 1946) is an American former professional football player who was a wide receiver in the American Football League (AFL) and National Football League (NFL). He played college football for the Utah Utes. He played professionally for the Kansas City Chiefs in 1968, Cincinnati Bengals in 1969 and Denver Broncos in 1971.
