= Julian Goodman =

American journalist (1922–2012)

Julian Bryn Goodman
- Born: May 1, 1922; Glasgow, Kentucky
- Died: July 2, 2012 (aged 90); Juno Beach, Florida

Julian Byrn Goodman (May 1, 1922 – July 2, 2012) was an American broadcasting executive and journalist.

== Personal ==
He was born in Glasgow, Kentucky and graduated from Glasgow High School. Goodman took a hard stance in support of the first amendment.

== Career ==
Goodman was known for never asking for a raise or promotion. He started his career as a reporter working $3 a week for The Glasgow Daily Times. He attended Western Kentucky State Teachers College from 1939 to 1942 as an economics major. He left in 1943 to join the United States Army and served for a few months. After serving in the Army, he moved to Washington. He graduated from George Washington University in 1948.

Here he met William McAndrew and was given a job for the night news desk. He produced the second Kennedy-Nixon debate. He served as president of NBC from 1966 to 1974. Goodman helped establish Chet Huntley and David Brinkley as a well-known news team. While working for NBC, he negotiated a $1 million deal to retain Johnny Carson as host of The Tonight Show. He also spent some time attempting to put an end to the Fairness Doctrine.

In 1968, while Goodman was president of NBC, the Heidi Bowl controversy occurred. An AFL football game between the New York Jets and Oakland Raiders was airing in the Sunday afternoon 4-7pm ET time slot, to be followed by the theatrical film Heidi. The game ran long, which was not expected, and at 7pm the network cut off the last minute of the game to air the film in the entire Eastern and Central time zones. Unfortunately there were two Raider scores in the last minute, and the outcome of the game reversed, unseen by over half the country. The controversy was so intense that Goodman issued a formal apology.

Goodman was included on the master list of Nixon political opponents. He was a member of the Peabody Awards Board of Jurors from 1986 to 1992.

== Family ==
Goodman was married to his wife Betty Davis, who was also from Kentucky. They married in 1946. Together they had four children, John, Jeffrey, Gregory, and Julie, along with six grandchildren.

== Death ==
Goodman died on July 2, 2012, at his home in Juno Beach, Florida, at the age of 90. The cause of his death was from kidney failure.

== Accolades ==
- 1973: Paul White Award, Radio Television Digital News Association

== Sources ==
- Staff report (June 28, 1973). Lists of White House 'Enemies' and Memorandums Relating to Those Named. The New York Times
