= Preston Ridlehuber =

American football player (born 1943)

No. 32, 37, 31
- Position: Running back

Personal information
- Born: November 2, 1943 (age 83); Greenwood, South Carolina, U.S.
- Listed height: 6 ft 2 in (1.88 m)
- Listed weight: 217 lb (98 kg)

Career information
- High school: Gainesville (Gainesville, Georgia)
- College: Georgia (1962-1965)
- NFL draft: 1966: 11th round, 166th overall pick
- AFL draft: 1966: 19th round, 168th overall pick

Career history
- Atlanta Falcons (1966); Cincinnati Bengals (1968)*; Oakland Raiders (1968); Buffalo Bills (1969)
- * Offseason or practice squad member only

Awards and highlights
- Scored final touchdown in the Heidi Game

Career NFL/AFL statistics
- Rushing yards: 55
- Rushing average: 4.6
- Receptions: 4
- Receiving yards: 84
- Total touchdowns: 3
- Stats at Pro Football Reference

Howard Preston Ridlehuber (born November 2, 1943) is a former American collegiate and professional football running back who played in both the National Football League (NFL) and the American Football League (AFL).

He played one season each with the NFL's Atlanta Falcons and the AFL's Oakland Raiders and Buffalo Bills. Ridlehuber was selected in the 11th round (166th overall) of the 1966 NFL Draft by the San Francisco 49ers and in the 19th round (168th overall) of the 1966 AFL Draft by the New York Jets.

He is perhaps best remembered for scoring the final touchdown in the iconic Heidi Game in 1968 while playing for the Oakland Raiders.

== Education ==
Ridlehuber graduated from Gainesville High School in Gainesville, Georgia, where he was a multi-sport athlete, competing in football, baseball, basketball, and track. He earned All-State honors as both a baseball pitcher and a football quarterback.

He then attended the University of Georgia, where he played quarterback for the football team rather than signing a professional contract as a pitcher with the Pittsburgh Pirates. Ridlehuber was awarded the C.M. Hendricks Most Valuable Player award in the 1964 Sun Bowl, in which Georgia defeated the Texas Tech Red Raiders. He was also a member of the Sigma Nu fraternity at Georgia.

== Football career ==
=== Oakland Raiders ===
Ridlehuber is best known for scoring a touchdown with 33 seconds remaining in a game against the New York Jets by recovering a fumble on a kickoff. This occurred during the famous Heidi Game, but most television viewers across the country missed the play because NBC switched its broadcast from the football game to the 1968 film Heidi. The Heidi Game, also known as the Heidi Bowl, led to a major change in how professional football is televised on network television: since then, games are shown in their entirety before evening programming begins.

=== Buffalo Bills ===
His most notable Buffalo Bills highlight came during a game against the then 0–5 Boston Patriots. Preston was a backup running back for the 2–3 Bills. O. J. Simpson had been concussed in Houston the previous week and did not dress for the Patriots game. Fullback Wayne Patrick (number 30) had carried the ball 17 times for 131 yards. Max Anderson (number 22), also known as "Mini Max" Anderson, had 10 carries for 46 yards.

Mini Max was injured during a collision on the field. His face mask shattered, and Anderson’s teeth were broken and scattered on the turf. While medical personnel attended to Anderson, Bills coach John Rauch called Preston to the sideline. The score was tied 16–16 late in the fourth quarter. Rauch knelt down and drew a play in the dirt—a halfback option play that had been practiced for the last couple of weeks. It was originally designed for O. J. Simpson to throw a short pass to the tight end to keep the drive alive in a short-yardage situation.

Preston took the play into the huddle and the play was set in motion. On the snap, Ridlehuber—who had been a quarterback at the University of Georgia—noticed the Patriots’ cornerback closing in on the tight end. Trusting his better judgment, he looked elsewhere for an open receiver. He then saw Bills wide receiver Haven Moses wide open and threw a 45-yard touchdown pass to him.

When he returned to the bench, Coach Rauch congratulated him and said, “Be glad it worked.” The play gave the Bills a 23–16 lead, which remained the final score. Notably, during that game, Ridlehuber’s regular jersey number (37) was ripped, so he wore a replacement jersey with the number 31 instead. The number 31 was traditionally retired by the Bills to represent a generic player and the "spirit of the franchise." Ridlehuber was the only player to wear number 31 for the Bills until it was unofficially returned to circulation in 1991.

== See also ==
- Other American Football League players
