= 1968 Kansas City Chiefs season =

NFL team season

- Owner: Lamar Hunt
- General manager: Jack Steadman
- Head coach: Hank Stram
- Home stadium: Municipal Stadium

Results
- Record: 12–2
- Division place: 2nd AFL Western
- Playoffs: Lost Divisional Playoffs (at Raiders) 6–41
- AFL All-Stars: QB Len Dawson; OT Jim Tyrer; G Ed Budde; DT Buck Buchanan; DE Jerry Mays; LB Jim Lynch; LB Willie Lanier; LB Bobby Bell; CB Emmitt Thomas; S Johnny Robinson; K Jan Stenerud

The 1968 Kansas City Chiefs season was the 9th season for the Kansas City Chiefs as a professional AFL franchise; They finished with a 12–2 record (the best in the Stram era), resulting in a tie for first place in the AFL Western Division with the Oakland Raiders, before the Raiders won the championship in a tiebreaker playoff, defeating the Chiefs 41–6.

The 1968 Chiefs boasted one of the finest defenses ever assembled by the club, allowing an AFL record (and still franchise-low) 170 points, or 12.1 points per game. The nucleus of the defensive unit was clearly in its prime, producing six AFL All-Stars, including all three of the squad's linebackers.

Offensively, quarterback Len Dawson led the AFL in passing for the fourth time. Guard Ed Budde won the AFL Offensive Player of the Week award for the October 20 game against the Raiders. It was the first time the award was given to an interior lineman.

The Chiefs began the season with a 7–1 record and rattled off five straight victories to close the regular season at 12–2, sharing the division crown with the Raiders and setting up their playoff on December 22, in which the Raiders advanced to the AFL Championship Game against the New York Jets. The loss to Oakland was a major event in the Chiefs' rivalry with the Raiders, one of the NFL's most storied feuds.

== Offseason ==
=== Draft ===
1968 Kansas City Chiefs draft
Round	Pick	Player	Position	College	Notes
1	19	Mo Moorman	Guard	Texas A&M	
1	22	George Daney	Guard	UTEP	
2	48	Mike Livingston *	Quarterback	SMU	
4	90	Mickey McCarty	Tight end	TCU	made in 1969
7	184	Sammy Grezaff	Defensive back	LSU	
8	213	Lindon Endsley	Center	North Texas	
9	239	Wayne McClure	Linebacker	Ole Miss	
10	265	Jack Gehrke	Wide receiver	Utah	
11	294	Tom Nosewicz	Defensive end	Tulane	
12	320	Bobby Johns	Defensive back	Alabama	
13	346	Jim Kavanagh	Wide receiver	Boston College	
14	375	Robert Holmes	Running back	Southern	
Made roster * Made at least one Pro Bowl during career

=== Undrafted free agents ===
1968 undrafted free agents of note
Player	Position	College
Ron McCraig	Tackle	New Mexico Highlands
Tim O'Rourke	Center	Northwest Missouri State

== Roster ==
1968 Kansas City Chiefs roster
Quarterbacks (QB): 16 Len Dawson; 11 Jacky Lee; 10 Mike Livingston; Running backs (RB): 23 Bert Coan; 21 Mike Garrett; 38 Wendell Hayes; 45 Robert Holmes; 26 Paul Lowe; 32 Curtis McClinton; Wide receivers (WR): 17 Jack Gehrke; 25 Frank Pitts; 30 Gloster Richardson; 1 Noland Smith; 89 Otis Taylor; Tight ends (TE): 84 Fred Arbanas; 80 Reggie Carolan	Offensive linemen (OL): 71 Ed Budde G; 60 George Daney G; 73 Dave Hill T; 55 E. J. Holub C; 64 Curt Merz G; 61 Mo Moorman G; 65 Remi Prudhomme C; 77 Jim Tyrer T; Defensive linemen (DL): 87 Aaron Brown DE; 86 Buck Buchanan DT; 61 Curley Culp DT; 99 Ernie Ladd DT; 82 Ed Lothamer DT; 75 Jerry Mays DE	Linebackers (LB): 52 Bud Abell OLB; 78 Bobby Bell OLB; 85 Chuck Hurston OLB; 63 Willie Lanier MLB; 51 Jim Lynch OLB; 58 Dave Martin MLB; Defensive backs (DB): 24 Caesar Belser SS; 46 Jim Kearney SS; 48 Sam Longmire FS; 22 Willie Mitchell CB; 42 Johnny Robinson FS; 20 Goldie Sellers CB; 18 Emmitt Thomas CB; Special teams (ST): 3 Jan Stenerud K; 44 Jerrel Wilson P	Reserve: 74 Gene Trosch DE (IR); Rookies in italics

== Preseason ==
Week	Date	Opponent	Result	Record	Venue	Attendance	Recap
1	August 3	at Cincinnati Bengals	W 38–14	1–0	Nippert Stadium	21,682	Recap
2	August 10	at Minnesota Vikings	W 13–10	2–0	Metropolitan Stadium	46,228	Recap
3	August 17	St. Louis Cardinals	W 13–10	3–0	Municipal Stadium	47,462	Recap
4	August 24	Oakland Raiders	W 31–21	4–0	Municipal Stadium	43,769	Recap
5	August 31	at Los Angeles Rams	L 16–36	4–1	Los Angeles Memorial Coliseum	54,323	Recap

== Regular season ==
Week	Date	Opponent	Result	Record	Venue	Attendance	Recap
1	September 9	at Houston Oilers	**W** 26–21	1–0	Houston Astrodome	45,083	Recap
2	September 15	New York Jets	**L** 19–20	1–1	Municipal Stadium	48,871	Recap
3	September 22	**Denver Broncos**	**W** 34–2	2–1	Municipal Stadium	45,821	Recap
4	September 28	at Miami Dolphins	**W** 48–3	3–1	Miami Orange Bowl	28,501	Recap
5	October 5	at Buffalo Bills	**W** 18–7	4–1	War Memorial Stadium	40,748	Recap
6	October 13	**Cincinnati Bengals**	**W** 13–3	5–1	Municipal Stadium	47,096	Recap
7	October 20	**Oakland Raiders**	**W** 24–10	6–1	Municipal Stadium	50,015	Recap
8	October 27	**San Diego Chargers**	**W** 27–20	7–1	Municipal Stadium	50,344	Recap
9	November 3	at **Oakland Raiders**	**L** 21–38	7–2	Oakland–Alameda County Coliseum	53,357	Recap
10	November 10	at **Cincinnati Bengals**	**W** 16–9	8–2	Nippert Stadium	25,537	Recap
11	November 17	Boston Patriots	**W** 31–17	9–2	Municipal Stadium	48,271	Recap
12	Bye						
13	November 28	Houston Oilers	**W** 24–10	10–2	Municipal Stadium	48,493	Recap
14	December 8	at **San Diego Chargers**	**W** 40–3	11–2	San Diego Stadium	51,174	Recap
15	December 14	at **Denver Broncos**	**W** 30–7	12–2	Bears Stadium	38,463	Recap
Note: Intra-division opponents are in **bold** text.

== Standings ==
AFL Western Division
	W	L	T	PCT	DIV	PF	PA	STK
Oakland Raiders	12	2	0	.857	6–2	453	233	W8
Kansas City Chiefs	12	2	0	.857	7–1	371	170	W5
San Diego Chargers	9	5	0	.643	5–3	382	310	L2
Denver Broncos	5	9	0	.357	1–7	255	404	L3
Cincinnati Bengals	3	11	0	.214	1–7	215	329	L3

Note: Tie games were not officially counted in the standings in the AFL.

== Postseason ==
A tie in the Western Division standings necessitated an unscheduled playoff game

=== Schedule ===
Round	Date	Opponent	Result	Record	Venue	Attendance	Recap
Division	December 22	at Oakland Raiders	L 6–41	0–1	Oakland–Alameda County Coliseum	53,605	Recap

==== AFL Divisional Playoffs: at Oakland Raiders ====
AFL Divisional Playoffs: Kansas City Chiefs at Oakland Raiders – Game summary

Quarter	1	2	3	4	Total
Chiefs	0	6	0	0	6
Raiders	21	7	0	13	41

at Oakland–Alameda County Coliseum, Oakland, California

- Date: December 22
- Game time: 1:00 p.m. PST
- Game weather: 42 °F (6 °C)
- Game attendance: 53,605
- TV announcers (NBC): Curt Gowdy, Kyle Rote and Al DeRogatis
- Recap

Game information

First quarter

- OAK – Fred Biletnikoff 24-yard pass from Daryle Lamonica (George Blanda kick). Raiders 7–0.
- OAK – Warren Wells 23-yard pass from Daryle Lamonica (George Blanda kick). Raiders 14–0.
- OAK – Fred Biletnikoff 44-yard pass from Daryle Lamonica (George Blanda kick). Raiders 21–0.

Second quarter

- KC – Jan Stenerud 10-yard field goal. Raiders 21–3.
- KC – Jan Stenerud 8-yard field goal. Raiders 21–6.
- OAK – Fred Biletnikoff 54-yard pass from Daryle Lamonica (George Blanda kick). Raiders 28–6.

Third quarter

- No scoring plays.

Fourth quarter

- OAK – Warren Wells 35-yard pass from Daryle Lamonica (George Blanda kick). Raiders 35–6.
- OAK – George Blanda 41-yard field goal. Raiders 38–6.
- OAK – George Blanda 40-yard field goal. Raiders 41–6.

Top passers

- KC – Len Dawson – 17/36, 253 yards, 4 INT
- OAK – Daryle Lamonica – 19/39, 347 yards, 5 TD

Top rushers

- KC – Robert Holmes – 13 rushes, 46 yards
- OAK – Charlie Smith – 13 rushes, 74 yards

Top receivers

- KC – Otis Taylor – 4 receptions, 117 yards
- OAK – Fred Biletnikoff – 7 receptions, 180 yards, 3 TD
