= Daryle Lamonica =

American football player (1941–2022)

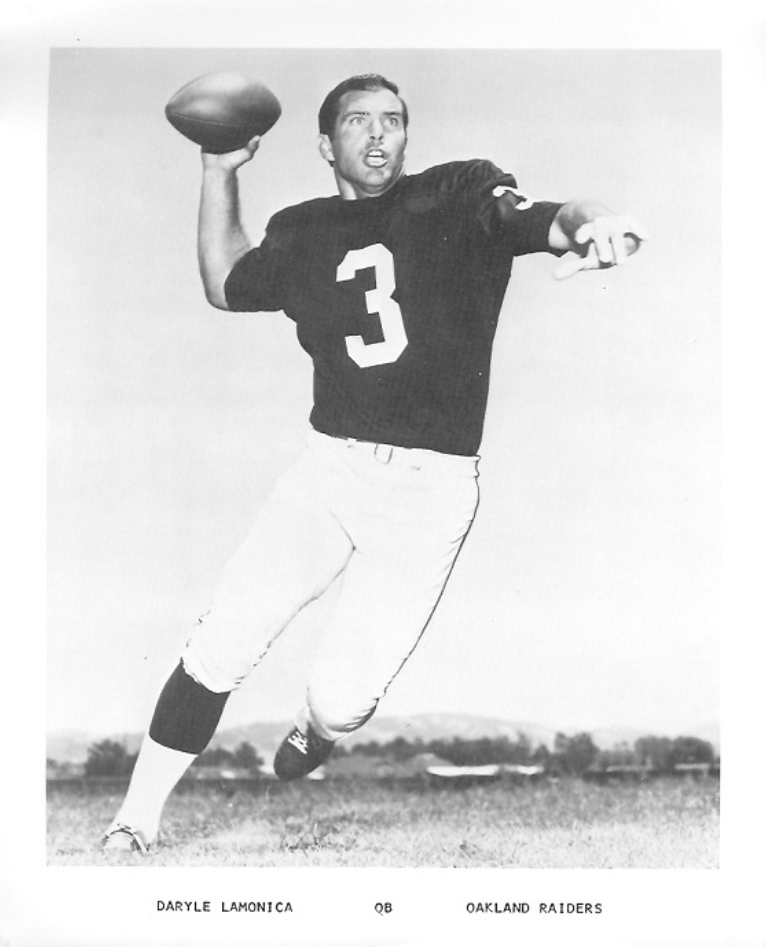
- Lamonica in 1969

No. 12, 3
- Position: Quarterback

Personal information
- Born: July 17, 1941; Fresno, California, U.S.
- Died: April 21, 2022 (aged 80); Fresno, California, U.S.
- Listed height: 6 ft 3 in (1.91 m)
- Listed weight: 215 lb (98 kg)

Career information
- High school: Clovis (Clovis, California)
- College: Notre Dame (1960–1962)
- NFL draft: 1963: 12th round, 168th overall pick
- AFL draft: 1963: 24th round, 188th overall pick

Career history
- Buffalo Bills (1963–1966); Oakland Raiders (1967–1974); Southern California Sun (1975)

Awards and highlights
- 3× AFL champion (1964, 1965, 1967); AFL Championship MVP (1967); 2× AFL Most Valuable Player (1967, 1969); 2× First-team All-AFL (1967, 1969); Second-team All-Pro (1970); 3× AFL All-Star (1965, 1967, 1969); 2× Pro Bowl (1970, 1972); 2× UPI AFL Player of the Year (1967, 1969); 2× AFL passing touchdowns leader (1967, 1969); AFL passing yards leader (1969); AFL rushing touchdowns co-leader (1964); Third-team All-American (1962)

Career AFL/NFL statistics
- Passing attempts: 2,601
- Passing completions: 1,288
- Completion percentage: 49.5%
- TD–INT: 164–138
- Passing yards: 19,154
- Passer rating: 72.9
- Rushing yards: 640
- Rushing touchdowns: 14
- Stats at Pro Football Reference

Daryle Pasquale Lamonica (July 17, 1941 – April 21, 2022) was an American professional football quarterback who played in the American Football League (AFL) and National Football League (NFL) for 12 seasons. Nicknamed "The Mad Bomber" due to almost always throwing long passes, he spent the majority of his career with the Oakland Raiders.

Lamonica played college football for the Notre Dame Fighting Irish and was selected in the 24th round of the 1963 AFL draft by the Buffalo Bills, where spent his first four seasons, mostly as a backup. He played his next eight seasons as the primary starter of the Raiders, including after they joined the NFL through the AFL–NFL merger, leading them to four consecutive division titles between 1967 and 1970 and an appearance in Super Bowl II. Lamonica was twice named AFL Most Valuable Player, in addition to receiving three AFL All-Star, two NFL Pro Bowl, and two first-team All-AFL selections. He was also the AFL leader in passing touchdowns during both MVP seasons and the passing yards leader during the second. Lamonica holds the NFL's second-highest quarterback winning percentage and the AFL's highest quarterback winning percentage.

== Early life ==
Of Italian and Irish ancestry, Lamonica grew up on a ranch in the Central Valley of California. Lamonica played in the first Little League World Series. He lettered in four sports and was an all-state quarterback at Clovis High School in Clovis, a Fresno suburb. In 1974, the high school named its football stadium after him. After high school, he turned down a professional baseball contract with the Chicago Cubs. Lamonica played college football at the University of Notre Dame, and was the team's starting quarterback for three seasons. In 30 total games from 1960 through 1962, he had 99 completions for 211 attempts for a 46.9 completion percentage and 1,363 yards, with eight touchdowns and 16 interceptions. He rushed 144 times for 353 yards and 10 touchdowns. He participated in the 1962 East-West Shrine Game held at Kezar Stadium in San Francisco, passing 20-for-28 with 349 yards while being named Most Valuable Player.

== Professional football ==
=== Buffalo Bills ===
Lamonica was selected by the Buffalo Bills in the 24th round of the 1963 AFL draft. He was also selected by the two-time defending NFL champion Green Bay Packers in the 12th round of the 1963 NFL draft. He chose to go with the Bills, as he perceived his chances of playing were better there. In his rookie year, he played sparingly in games with Jack Kemp being the primary quarterback while Lamonica came into duty after injuries or ineffectiveness, which led to him being dubbed "the Fireman". However, he was tasked to start the last two games for the Bills. In each, he led them to victory, notably going 10-for-16 with 115 yards with a touchdown in a 45–14 win over the New York Jets. For the season, he had 33 completions on 71 attempts for 437 yards, with three touchdowns and four interceptions. In the tiebreaker playoff for the division title, he came on for Kemp late in the game, going 9-for-24 for 168 yards with a touchdown and three interceptions, as the Bills lost 26–8 at home to the Boston Patriots.

Lamonica had much of the same in terms of playing time in 1964, going 55 of 128 with 1,137 yards with six touchdowns and eight interceptions. On rushing, he was most efficient, having 55 carries for 289 yards (a 5.3 average per carry) for six touchdowns, which was tied for the most in the league alongside others such as Sid Blanks and his teammate Cookie Gilchrist. He started one of the last games of the season against the Denver Broncos, going 6-of-21 for 89 yards with a touchdown and interception, but Buffalo prevailed 30–19. In 1965, the same was true once again. He went 29 of 70 for 376 yards, with three touchdowns and six interceptions. For the third and final season, he started a game for the Bills, going 3-of-14 for 83 yards with a touchdown and interception in a 29–18 win over the Houston Oilers. For his fourth and final year in Buffalo in 1966, he went 33-of-84 for 549 yards, having four touchdowns and five interceptions. In the three Buffalo runs to the AFL title game from 1964 to 1966, he had minimal participation, throwing only one pass.

=== Oakland Raiders ===
On March 14, 1967, Lamonica was traded to the Oakland Raiders with Glenn Bass for Art Powell and Tom Flores. He played with Oakland until his final year in 1974. With John Rauch at the helm as coach, Lamonica thrived from the start. In 1967 he threw 220-for-425 for 3,228 yards with thirty touchdowns and twenty interceptions while rushing for four touchdowns. The team went 13–1 in the regular season and won the division title with Lamonica at the helm; in the AFL title game against the Oilers on December 31, he went 10-of-24 for 111 yards with two touchdowns as the Raiders won, 40–7, to win their first championship as a franchise. Two weeks later, he faced off against the Green Bay Packers in Super Bowl II. He went 15-of-34 for 208 yards, with two touchdowns and one interception (returned by Herb Adderley for a touchdown), as the Raiders lost 33–14. Lamonica was given the American Football League Most Valuable Player Award for the season by United Press International, the Associated Press, and The Sporting News.

In 1968 he was efficient once again, going 206-of-416 for 3,245 yards in thirteen games (Lamonica missed the ninth game of the season, which George Blanda started). He threw 25 touchdowns and fifteen interceptions. His longest completed pass was 82 yards, his longest as a Raider for his career. He threw 249.6 yards per game, a career high. In the infamous Heidi Game, he went 21-of-34 for 311 yards with four touchdowns and two interceptions, with his final touchdown to Charlie Smith being the deciding points in a nail-biting victory. The Raiders charged to a 12–2 record, tied with Kansas City for the best record in the Western Division. They trounced the Chiefs 41–6 to return to the AFL championship. Playing against the New York Jets at Shea Stadium, Lamonica went 20-of-47 for 401 yards with a touchdown, but the Jets rallied to defeat Oakland 27–23.

Lamonica was consistent once again in 1969 (the last for the AFL and first for John Madden as coach). He had career highs with 221 completions, 426 attempts, 3,302 yards, 34 touchdowns, and 25 interceptions. He had 235.9 yards per game. The Raiders went 12–1–1, winning the Western Division once again. On October 19, against the Buffalo Bills, Lamonica set a new record with six touchdown passes in the first half, a record that has been matched only once, by Aaron Rodgers against the Chicago Bears on November 9, 2014. Lamonica's team went to the playoffs once again, which had been expanded to four teams for the final year of the AFL. In the divisional playoff game versus overmatched Houston, he threw 13-of-17 for 276 yards with six touchdowns and one interception for a 56–7 victory. In the AFL Championship Game (the last game between two AFL teams), facing the Chiefs in Oakland, Lamonica threw 15-of-39 for 167 yards and three interceptions as the Chiefs won, 17–7, to advance to Super Bowl IV. Lamonica was given the American Football League Most Valuable Player Award for the season by United Press International and The Sporting News, with Joe Namath being named Most Valuable Player by the Associated Press. It was in Oakland that Lamonica's affinity for - and talent in - long passes earned him the nickname "the Mad Bomber".

Lamonica regressed a bit for 1970, throwing 179-of-356 for 2,516 yards with 22 touchdowns and fifteen interceptions as the team went 8–4–2. The team was aided by the fourth quarter heroics of George Blanda, who came off the bench for Lamonica in five straight games (games six to ten) in the fourth quarter, helping them win four games and tie once. The team snuck through into the NFL playoffs, edging out Kansas City for the newly installed AFC West division title. In their divisional playoff, Lamonica went 8-of-16 for 187 yards and two touchdowns as the Raiders prevailed, 21–14, over the Miami Dolphins in Oakland. In the AFC Championship Game against the Baltimore Colts, Lamonica went 1-of-4 for six yards before a hit by Bubba Smith resulted in him being taken out for Blanda as the Raiders were beaten, 27–17.

On September 17, 1972, Lamonica had a perfect passing rating of 158.3. In a game that was started by Ken Stabler with additional play from George Blanda, Lamonica stepped in to throw 8-of-10 for 172 yards with two touchdowns, turning a 27 –7 trouncing by the Pittsburgh Steelers into a 34–28 loss. Lamonica started the remaining thirteen games for the season. He had 149 completions on 281 attempts for 1,998 yards, having a career-high 53.0 completion percentage while throwing eighteen touchdowns and twelve interceptions. The team went 10-2-1 for the year and won the Western Division title. In the divisional playoff game that year against Pittsburgh at Three Rivers Stadium on December 23, he went 6-of-18 for 45 yards with two interceptions. Ken Stabler stepped in late in the game, and while he only went 6-of-12 for 57 yards, his thirty-yard rush for a touchdown gave the Raiders a late 7–6 lead with less than two minutes remaining. However, Franco Harris caught a tipped pass from Terry Bradshaw in what is now known as the Immaculate Reception to give Pittsburgh a 13–7 victory. It was Lamonica's last playoff appearance.

With Lamonica, the Raiders won four straight Western Division titles (three AFL and one AFC) and one American Football League championship. Lamonica was a three-time American Football League All-Star and twice was selected as the AFL's Most Valuable Player, in 1967 and 1969. Lamonica went 66–16–4 (.791) as a starter, second-best in NFL history (Otto Graham is the highest at .810). In the American Football League, Lamonica's winning percentage as a starter was .909, on 40 wins, 4 losses and 1 tie in 45 games, the best ever in the AFL. Although excellent at man-for-man coverage, he had a hard time reading zone defenses, more prevalent in the 1970s, and his throwing was sometimes inaccurate. As a Raider starter from 1967 to 1972, his best completion average was 53.0% (in 1972).

After Lamonica was unable to lead the Raiders to an offensive touchdown in the first three games of the 1973 season, he was replaced by Ken Stabler. Stabler was better at reading defenses and more accurate, leading the 1976 team to victory in Super Bowl XI.

=== World Football League ===
Lamonica was the 25th player to jump from the NFL to the World Football League (WFL) on April 16, 1974, when he signed a multiyear contract to join the Southern California Sun in 1975. He went 9-of-19 for ninety yards and one touchdown in limited playing time in his only season in the WFL which folded in late October of that year. He announced his retirement in September of that year due to his arthritic knee.

== Career statistics ==
Legend
	AFL MVP
	Won the AFL Championship
	Led the league
**Bold**	Career high

=== Regular season ===
Year	Team	Games			Passing									Rushing				
Year	Team	GP	GS	Record	Cmp	Att	Pct	Yds	Avg	Lng	TD	Int	Rtg	Att	Yds	Avg	Lng	TD
1963	BUF	**14**	2	2–0	33	71	46.5	437	6.2	**93**	3	4	57.1	9	8	0.9	7	0
1964	BUF	**14**	1	1–0	55	128	43.0	1,137	**8.9**	80	6	8	64.5	**55**	**289**	**5.3**	**28**	**6**
1965	BUF	**14**	1	1–0	29	70	41.4	376	5.4	74	3	6	37.6	10	30	3.0	10	1
1966	BUF	**14**	0	–	33	84	39.3	549	6.5	55	4	5	53.1	9	6	0.7	14	1
1967	OAK	**14**	**14**	**13–1**	220	425	51.8	3,228	7.6	72	30	20	80.8	22	110	5.0	26	4
1968	OAK	13	13	11–2	206	416	49.5	3,245	7.8	82	25	15	**80.9**	19	98	5.2	**28**	1
1969	OAK	**14**	**14**	**12–1–1**	**221**	**426**	51.9	**3,302**	7.8	80	**34**	**25**	79.8	13	36	2.8	12	1
1970	OAK	**14**	**14**	8–4–2	179	356	50.3	2,516	7.1	60	22	15	76.5	8	24	3.0	13	0
1971	OAK	**14**	13	7–4–2	118	242	48.8	1,717	7.1	67	16	16	66.8	4	16	4.0	13	0
1972	OAK	**14**	13	10–2–1	149	281	**53.0**	1,998	7.1	70	18	12	79.5	10	33	3.3	14	0
1973	OAK	8	3	1–2	42	93	45.2	614	6.6	48	2	8	38.6	5	-7	-1.4	6	0
1974	OAK	4	0	–	3	9	33.3	35	3.9	13	1	4	43.5	2	-3	-1.5	0	0
Career		151	88	66–16–6	1,288	2,601	49.5	19,154	7.4	93	164	138	72.9	166	640	3.9	28	14

== After football ==
In later years, he hosted a national fishing show on Fox Sports Net called Outdoors with the Pros.

In 2013, Football Nation named Lamonica the 67th best quarterback since the 1970 merger. The Professional Football Researchers Association named Lamonica to their Hall of Very Good Class of 2013.

On April 21, 2022, he died at the age of 80 in his sleep at his home in Fresno, California.

Awards
Preceded by Jim Nance	American Football League Most Valuable Player; 1967	Succeeded by Joe Namath
Preceded by Joe Namath	American Football League Most Valuable Player; 1969 with Joe Namath	NFL merged with AFL
