= Warren Wells =

American football player (1942–2018)

- Wells with the Raiders

No. 87, 81, 26
- Position: Wide receiver

Personal information
- Born: November 14, 1942; Franklin, Louisiana, U.S.
- Died: December 27, 2018 (aged 76); Beaumont, Texas, U.S.
- Listed height: 6 ft 1 in (1.85 m)
- Listed weight: 190 lb (86 kg)

Career information
- High school: Hebert (Beaumont, Texas)
- College: Texas Southern (1960-1963)
- NFL draft: 1964: 12th round, 160th overall pick

Career history
- Detroit Lions (1964); Oakland Raiders (1967-1970); Houston Oilers (1972)*; Houston Texans-Shreveport Steamer (1974)
- * Offseason or practice squad member only

Awards and highlights
- AFL champion (1967); First-team All-AFL (1969); Second-team All-Pro (1970); AFL All-Star (1968); Pro Bowl (1970); 2× AFL receiving touchdowns leader (1968, 1969); AFL receiving yards leader (1969)

Career NFL/AFL statistics
- Reception: 158
- Receiving yards: 3,655
- Receiving touchdowns: 42
- Stats at Pro Football Reference

Warren Wells (November 14, 1942 – December 27, 2018) was an American professional football player who was a wide receiver for five seasons in the National Football League (NFL) and American Football League (AFL). He played with the Detroit Lions and Oakland Raiders. He had success with the Raiders with two 1,000-yard seasons and All-Star and Pro Bowl appearances, but saw his career end because of legal troubles.

== Early life ==
Wells grew up in Beaumont, Texas, where he attended Hebert High School; he was one of 16 pro footballers honored with the keys to the city in 1971. He attended Texas Southern University until 1964 when he was taken 160th overall in the 12th round of the 1964 NFL draft by the Detroit Lions.

== Professional football career ==
1969 photo of Wells for the Oakland Raiders

He made appearances in nine games with the Lions and made two receptions for 21 yards for his rookie year. However, he was drafted into the U.S. Army after the season ended. In 1967, he returned from his military service and signed with the Raiders. While with the Raiders, with mostly Daryle Lamonica as his quarterback, he was one of the most dangerous wide receivers in the league, finishing with over 20 yards per catch in all four seasons.

Wells started off his Raiders career with a week 2 appearance against the Denver Broncos. He caught two passes for 96 yards with a touchdown, scoring from 50 yards on a George Blanda pass. He appeared in seven games for the Raider games during the regular season, making 13 catches for 302 yards with six touchdowns. After catching no passes against the Houston Oilers in the AFL championship game, Wells had one catch for 17 yards in the 33–14 Super Bowl II loss to the Green Bay Packers. In 1968, as a starter in 12 games, Wells caught 53 passes for 1,137 yards for a league-leading 11 touchdowns. In the postseason run for the Raiders, he caught four passes for 93 yards for two touchdowns as Oakland advanced to the AFL title game with a 41–6 win over the Kansas City Chiefs. In the AFL Championship against the New York Jets, he caught three passes for 83 yards but the Raiders lost, 27–23.

In 1969, Wells led the league in receiving yards with 1,260 and touchdowns with 14 while also averaging 90 yards per game. However, in the 1969 postseason, he was held to one catch for 24 yards in the loss. In 1970, he managed to snag 43 passes for 935 yards with 11 touchdowns. In the playoffs, Wells played only in the AFC Championship game against the Baltimore Colts. He caught a touchdown pass from George Blanda to narrow the score to 20–17 in the fourth quarter, but Baltimore scored soon after to pull away. Wells was the lead receiver for the Raiders, having caught five passes for 108 yards and a touchdown. This was his last professional game.

He was an AFL All-Star in 1968 and an AFC-NFC All-Pro in 1970. Until the league changed their guidelines for yards per reception counting only for those with at least 200 career receptions, Wells had the league record for yards per reception, having averaged 23.1 yards on 158 receptions.

== Legal troubles ==
Before the 1971 season started, Wells's career was cut short following legal difficulties relating to his divorce and subsequent criminal charges. Following the Pro Bowl game in Los Angeles on January 24, 1971, Wells was met by police in the locker room and arrested on a warrant for a probation violation originating from his conviction in 1969 for aggravated assault. In 1969, he had been charged with rape, which was later reduced to aggravated assault. His probation was revoked in 1970 because he was drinking in a bar, a violation further complicated when a woman stabbed him in the chest. He missed the 1971 season. Instead of sending him to prison, a judge allowed him to enter Synanon, which was presented as a drug rehabilitation program that ended up serving as an alternative community that utilized attack therapy that has been thought of as a cult. When he left, one teammate stated that he looked "emotionally void." The Raiders released him in 1971 and he never played football again. His personal life disintegrated further after his career was over.

== Later life and death ==
Following his career, Wells continued to struggle with alcoholism and later dementia, but later became sober. Wells died in Beaumont, Texas, on December 27, 2018, from a heart attack at the age of 76. His brain was later sent to be tested for chronic traumatic encephalopathy.

== NFL/AFL career statistics ==
Legend
	Won the AFL championship
	Led the league
**Bold**	Career high

=== Regular season ===
Year	Team	Games		Receiving				
Year	Team	GP	GS	Rec	Yds	Avg	Lng	TD
1964	DET	9	0	2	21	10.5	13	0
1967	OAK	**14**	3	13	302	23.2	50	6
1968	OAK	**14**	12	**53**	1,137	21.5	**94**	11
1969	OAK	**14**	**14**	47	**1,260**	**26.8**	80	**14**
1970	OAK	**14**	13	43	935	21.7	60	11
Career		65	42	158	3,655	23.1	94	42

== See also ==
- Other American Football League players
