= Hewritt Dixon =

American football player (1940–1992)

No. 30, 35
- Positions: Halfback, Tight end

Personal information
- Born: January 8, 1940; Alachua, Florida, U.S.
- Died: November 24, 1992 (aged 52); Los Angeles, California, U.S.
- Listed height: 6 ft 2 in (1.88 m)
- Listed weight: 230 lb (104 kg)

Career information
- High school: A. L. Mebane (Alachua)
- College: Florida A&M (1959–1962)
- NFL draft: 1963: 11th round, 151st overall pick
- AFL draft: 1963: 8th round, 60th overall pick

Career history

Playing
- Denver Broncos (1963–1965); Oakland Raiders (1966–1970)

Coaching
- Los Angeles Rams (1980–1981) Offensive backs coach

Awards and highlights
- AFL champion (1967); 2× All-AFL (1967, 1968); 3× AFL All-Star (1966, 1967, 1968); Pro Bowl (1970)

Career AFL/NFL statistics
- Rushing yards: 3,090
- Rushing average: 4
- Rushing touchdowns: 15
- Receptions: 263
- Receiving yards: 2,819
- Receiving touchdowns: 13
- Stats at Pro Football Reference

Hewritt Frederick Dixon Jr. (January 8, 1940 – November 24, 1992) was an American professional football halfback who played for seven seasons in the American Football League (AFL) and National Football League (NFL). He played for the Denver Broncos and the Oakland Raiders.

== Early life and college ==
Dixon was born in Alachua, Florida on January 8, 1940. He attended Albert Leonidas Mebane High School in Alachua.

He was originally a tackle on the high school football team because of his size, but he was converted to a fullback when the coach witnessed Dixon's running ability. He was all-conference four years.

Dixon received college scholarship offers from most schools that accepted African Americans on their football teams at the time. At the encouragement of his father and his high school coach, Dixon attended Florida A&M University. Future Hall of Fame receiver Bob Hayes was Dixon's teammate at Florida A&M.

Dixon would have played in the 1962 Shrine North-South All-Star Game, but he had a leg injury. His coach Jake Gaither was concerned that playing would exacerbate the injury and harm Dixon's professional prospects. Gaither was a future College Football Hall of Fame coach, who was Florida A&M's head coach for 25 years, winning six black college national championships.

Dixon was inducted into Florida A&M's Hall of Fame in 1981.

== Professional football ==
In the 1963 American Football League draft, Dixon was selected in the eighth round (60th overall) by the Denver Broncos. He was selected in the 11th round (151st overall) of the 1963 NFL draft by the Pittsburgh Steelers. Dixon chose to play for Denver.

=== Denver Broncos ===
In his rookie year (1963), Dixon only played in five games for the Broncos, at running back. In 1964, the Broncos moved him to tight end. He started 12 of 14 games. Dixon had 38 pass receptions for 585 yards (15.4 yards per reception), including a 62-yard reception (the longest of his career). He also rushed the ball 18 times. In 1965, he started 11 games at tight end, with 25 receptions for 354 yards.

=== Oakland Raiders ===
Denver traded Dixon to the Raiders in 1966, and he would play in Oakland for five years (1966–1970), until he retired. The Raiders moved Dixon back to running back from tight end, where he joined halfback Clem Daniels in the Raiders backfield. From 1962 to 1965, Daniels had rushed for at least 766 yards each season, including a 1,099 yard season and two seasons over 800 yards.

In 1966, Dixon started seven games at fullback, rushing for 277 yards on 68 attempts. He also caught 29 passes for 354 yards, averaging nearly 12 yards per catch. He scored five rushing touchdowns and four receiving touchdowns. He was selected to play in the AFL All-Star Game in 1966. In 1966, Daniels had 801 yards rushing and 652 yards receiving, scoring a combined 10 touchdowns.

In 1967, Daniels suffered an injury after nine games that effectively ended his career. Dixon stepped up with 559 rushing yards in 153 attempts, as well as 59 receptions for 563 yards. He was again selected to play in the All-Star Game, and was also named first-team All-AFL by The Sporting News, and second-team All-AFL by the Associated Press (AP) and United Press International (UPI). The Raiders defeated the Houston Oilers for the 1967 AFL championship. Dixon rushed for 144 yards on 21 attempts, including a 69-yard touchdown run. The Raiders next met the Green Bay Packers for the AFL-NFL championship game, later known as Super Bowl II, which the Raiders lost 33–14. Dixon ran for 54 yards in 12 attempts.

In 1968, without Daniels, Dixon's rushing attempts increased to 206, and he ran for 865 yards. He also had 38 pass receptions for 360 yards. He again was chosen to play in the All-Star game, but this year he was named first-team All-AFL by the AP, UPI, and The Sporting News, as well as the Newspaper Enterprise Association (NEA) and Pro Football Weekly. The Raiders lost the 1968 championship game to the New York Jets, 27–23, Dixon having 42 rushing yards (eight attempts) and 48 receiving yards (five catches).

In 1969, Dixon played in only 11 games (starting 10) and had only 106 rushing attempts. The Raiders lost the last AFL championship game (before the two leagues merged) to the Kansas City Chiefs, with Dixon running the ball 12 times. Dixon rebounded in 1970, with 861 rushing yards on 197 carries, a 4.4 yards per attempt average which was the highest of his career; and 31 pass receptions for 207 yards. In the Raiders first appearance on Monday Night Football, Dixon ran for 164 yards on 18 attempts, including a 39-yard touchdown run. The Raiders lost in the American Football Conference (AFC) championship game to the Baltimore Colts, with Dixon rushing 10 times for 51 yards, and catching three passes. He was selected to play in the 1970 Pro Bowl, and both the AP and UPI named him first-team All-Conference.

Dixon suffered a significant injury during the 1971 preseason, but was expected to return at some point in October. He joined the Raiders' taxi squad that season, and was reportedly ready to play, but did not play for the Raiders in 1971. It was reported at the time that because the Raiders five running backs were performing well that season, coach John Madden chose not to bring Dixon back to the Raiders off of the taxi squad. Dixon was in the Raiders' 1972 training camp, but his chances of making the team were tenuous. At the end of August he underwent knee surgery. He never played for the Raiders again.

== Legacy ==
At the time of his death in 1992, Dixon was the 8th leading rusher and 10th leading pass receiver in Raiders' history. His nickname was "Hewie the Tank". San Francisco 49ers' defensive end Tommy Hart said, in discussing the difficulty in tackling running backs, "I know I'll never forget hitting Hewritt Dixon of Oakland. He weighs 230 and he is really something. I had a stiff neck for a week after colling with him. He is the toughest runner I ever tackles".

Over his entire career, he played in 99 games, with 3,090 rushing yards on 772 carries and 15 touchdowns; along with 263 pass receptions for 2,819 yards and 13 touchdowns.

== NFL/AFL career statistics ==
Legend
	Won the AFL championship
	Led the league
**Bold**	Career high

=== Regular season ===
Year	Team	Games		Rushing					Receiving				
Year	Team	GP	GS	Att	Yds	Avg	Lng	TD	Rec	Yds	Avg	Lng	TD
1963	DEN	5	2	23	105	**4.6**	18	2	10	130	13.0	30	0
1964	DEN	14	12	18	25	1.4	17	0	38	**585**	**15.4**	62	1
1965	DEN	14	11	0	0	0.0	0	0	25	354	14.2	59	2
1966	OAK	14	7	68	277	4.1	23	**5**	29	345	11.9	**76**	**4**
1967	OAK	13	11	153	559	3.7	**40**	**5**	**59**	563	9.5	48	2
1968	OAK	14	13	**206**	**865**	4.2	28	2	38	360	9.5	41	2
1969	OAK	11	10	107	398	3.7	19	0	33	275	8.3	37	1
1970	OAK	14	14	197	861	4.4	39	1	31	207	6.7	46	1
		99	80	772	3,090	4.0	40	15	263	2,819	10.7	76	13

=== Playoffs ===
Year	Team	Games		Rushing					Receiving				
Year	Team	GP	GS	Att	Yds	Avg	Lng	TD	Rec	Yds	Avg	Lng	TD
1967	OAK	2	2	**33**	**198**	**6.0**	**69**	**1**	2	11	5.5	8	0
1968	OAK	2	2	18	55	3.1	28	0	**6**	**55**	**9.2**	**23**	0
1969	OAK	2	2	25	84	3.4	17	0	1	1	1.0	1	0
1970	OAK	2	2	18	82	4.6	14	0	4	18	4.5	7	0
		8	8	94	419	4.5	69	1	13	85	6.5	23	0

== Personal life ==
After retiring, he became the athletic director at Oakland's McClymonds High School. Dixon later moved to Los Angeles and worked for many years with youth offenders at Eastlake Juvenile Hall.

== Death ==
Dixon died of cancer in Los Angeles, California, on November 24, 1992. He was survived by his wife Elizabeth.

== See also ==
- List of American Football League players
