= John Herrera (gridiron football) =

American football executive

John Herrera is an American football executive who, for much of his career, was a Senior Executive with the Oakland Raiders.

Herrera's father owned a Buick dealership in Oakland and knew Raiders owner Al Davis as a business acquaintance. Herrera's father arranged for his son to have an interview and Herrera became a Raiders ballboy starting in 1963 while still in high school. Herrera joined the team full-time in 1967 in the business and public relations departments. Following that, Herrera spent four years working for a record company owned by United Artists as well as a stint working for the Washington Redskins as a scout. In 1976, NFL expansion team Tampa Bay Buccaneers hired Herrera as a scout. While with the Buccaneers organization, Herrera met future NFL executive Tim Ruskell while Ruskell was working at a record store in Tampa. At Herrera's invitation, Ruskell became a ball boy and visiting locker room manager for the Buccaneers. In 1978, Herrera rejoined the Raiders as Director of Public Relations and celebrated a Super Bowl victory with the team in 1981. Herrera left the Raiders in 1982 to become director of player-personnel for the BC Lions of the Canadian Football League and later that year was named general manager of the Saskatchewan Roughriders.

Herrera returned to the Raiders in 1985 with the title "senior executive." His duties as senior executive have included working as the team's travel and camp coordinator and serving as the Raiders chief negotiator during their failed move to Irwindale, California. Herrera left the Raiders in 2012.
