= George Atkinson (safety) =

American football player (1947–2025)

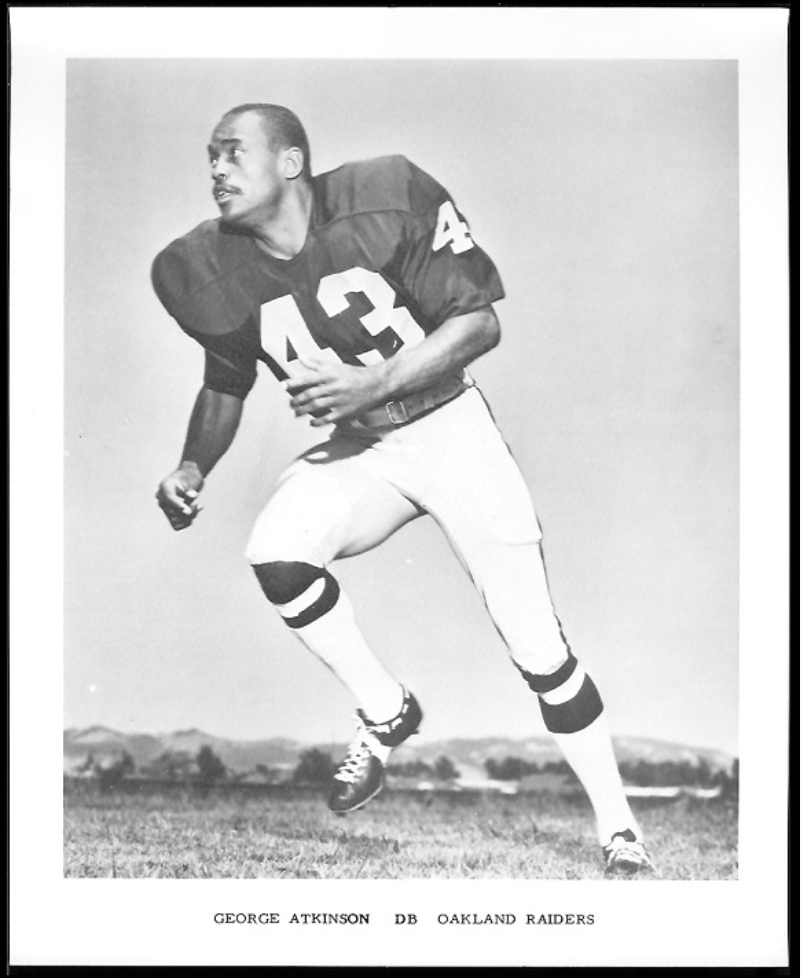
- Atkinson in promotional image for Raiders in 1969

No. 43, 47
- Positions: Safety, return specialist

Personal information
- Born: January 4, 1947; Savannah, Georgia, U.S.
- Died: October 27, 2025 (aged 78); Georgia, U.S.
- Listed height: 6 ft 0 in (1.83 m)
- Listed weight: 180 lb (82 kg)

Career information
- High school: Sol C. Johnson (Savannah)
- College: Morris Brown (1964–1967)
- NFL draft: 1968: 7th round, 190th overall pick

Career history
- Oakland Raiders (1968–1977); Denver Broncos (1979)

Awards and highlights
- Super Bowl champion (XI); Second-team All-AFL (1969); 2× AFL All-Star (1968, 1969); AFL co-Defensive Rookie of the Year (1968)

Career AFL/NFL statistics
- Interceptions: 30
- Interception yards: 448
- Fumble recoveries: 13
- Defensive touchdowns: 4
- Return yards: 3,140
- Return touchdowns: 3
- Stats at Pro Football Reference

George Henry Atkinson II (January 4, 1947 – October 27, 2025) was an American professional football player who was a safety and return specialist for the Oakland Raiders of the American Football League (AFL) and National Football League (NFL) from 1968 to 1977. Nicknamed "Hit Man", he played college football for the Morris Brown Wolverines and was selected by the Raiders in the seventh round (190th overall) of the 1968 NFL/AFL draft. He played ten seasons with the Raiders where he was known as a crucial part of the "Soul Patrol" defense of the 1970s. After his career he served as a radio and television broadcaster of the team.

== Early life and college ==
George Atkinson II was born on January 4, 1947, in Savannah, Georgia. He played running back, safety, and returned punts while at Sol C. Johnson High School in Savannah at a time when the school was still segregated. He also played basketball and ran track and field. He graduated from high school in 1964.

Atkinson then attended Morris Brown College, where he pursued a social studies major. He played as a free safety, but was also well known as a kick and punt returner. He earned four letters in football and three in track, and was an All-America honorable mention.

== Playing career ==
Atkinson was drafted 190th overall in the seventh round of the 1968 NFL/AFL draft. He started his career as a cornerback / kick returner. Facing the Buffalo Bills on September 15 during his rookie season, he scored an 86-yard touchdown on a punt return. He returned five total punts during the game for 205 yards, an NFL record at the time, (along with one kick return for 25 yards) in the win. On offense for the season, he returned 36 punts for 490 yards and two touchdowns (all AFL highs) while returning 32 kicks for 802 yards. On defense, he had four interceptions for 66 yards and a touchdown. He would do returns on and off for the next seven years to go with his defense, although never as much as before; he returned 112 punts and 44 kicks combined in the years after 1968 for one total touchdown and 2,323 yards.

He was named an AFL All-Star in his first two seasons in the AFL. For his career he averaged about three interceptions per game. He had as many as 4 interceptions in a season (1971, 1972, 1974–1975), and as little as 2 (1969, 1977). In 1974 he had 3 interceptions against Cleveland. He ranks fifth on the Raiders all-time interception list with 30.

Later, Atkinson became part of a formidable safety duo with Jack Tatum when he was drafted in 1971. This was part of the "Soul Patrol", the defensive backfield of the Oakland Raiders during the 1970s that was well known for its physicality. The group consisted of Atkinson, Jack Tatum, Skip Thomas, and hall of famer Willie Brown. Atkinson spent 10 seasons with the Raiders before finishing his career with the Denver Broncos, spending one season with the team. He played in 144 games.

In a regular-season game in 1976 vs. the Pittsburgh Steelers, the Raiders' arch-rival, Atkinson hit an unsuspecting Lynn Swann in the back of the head with a forearm smash, even though the ball had not been thrown to Swann. The hit rendered Swann unconscious with a concussion. Atkinson had also hit Swann in a similar manner in the previous season's AFC Championship game, which also gave Swann a concussion. After the second incident, Steelers' coach Chuck Noll referred to Atkinson as part of the "criminal element" in football. Atkinson subsequently filed a $2 million defamation lawsuit against Noll and the Steelers, which Atkinson lost.

== Post-NFL career ==
Atkinson worked as a Raiders broadcaster, doing the pre-game and post-game shows on both television and radio for seventeen years. He also hosted a television program called Behind the Shield.

Atkinson was also known for his various appearances in the media where he provided endless complaints on "controversial" calls made against the Oakland Raiders, which were almost always accompanied by Atkinson claiming without evidence that the NFL targeted the Raiders for punishment due to bias and corruption and not based on what the organization had actually done (or not done). One notable example was the Immaculate Reception. Atkinson contended that there were three "infractions" that occurred on the play that could have changed the outcome of the game had they been called. Atkinson also said on an NFL Network show that addressed the 2002 tuck rule reversal of a Tom Brady fumble into an incompletion that started the Patriots road to beating the Raiders (and later winning Super Bowl XXXVI) that the rule had never been used except to ruin the Raiders season; his statement lost credibility because the Patriots themselves had been on the other side of the tuck rule earlier in the 2001 season during a loss to the Jets, when it cost them what appeared to be a key fumble by Vinny Testaverde.

== Personal life and death ==
Atkinson had nine children including twins Josh and George III. Atkinson was married to Denise until his death. Atkinson's twin sons, George and Josh, played college football for Notre Dame. George went on to become an NFL running back. Both Josh and George died by suicide; Josh on December 25, 2018, and George (following a previous suicide attempt shortly after Josh's death) on December 2, 2019.

In 2010, Atkinson suffered a heart-related health episode while driving his car, bumping into a pedestrian. He was in the hospital for eight days after the incident and needed to have a pacemaker installed. Atkinson later died in Georgia on October 27, 2025, at the age of 78. He pledged to donate his brain to the Concussion Legacy Foundation to be tested for chronic traumatic encephalopathy (CTE). He had previously stated he was suffering from symptoms of the disease in a 2016 interview.

== See also ==
- List of American Football League players
- List of family relations in American football
