= Bill Budness =

American football player (1943–2018)

Profile
- Position: Linebacker

Personal information
- Born: January 30, 1943; Chicopee, Massachusetts, U.S.
- Died: January 24, 2018 (aged 74); Georgetown, Delaware, U.S.

Career information
- High school: Chicopee
- College: Boston University
- AFL draft: 1964: 4th round, 31st overall pick

Career history
- Oakland Raiders (1964–1970)

Awards and highlights
- AFL champion (1967); Second-team All-American (1963); Second-team All-East (1963)

Career professional statistics
- Games played: 92
- Games started: 4
- Interceptions: 3
- Stats at Pro Football Reference

William Walter Budness (January 30, 1943 – January 24, 2018) was an American professional football player who was a linebacker for seven seasons for the Oakland Raiders of the American Football League (AFL) and National Football League (NFL). He played college football for the Boston University Terriers.

He played in three consecutive AFL title games (1967, 1968, and 1969), with his team winning in 1967, earning the right to play in Super Bowl II.

He was a high school senior captain in 1959. He would lead the team past Holyoke to win Chicopee's first AA Conference title (20–0).

He is considered one of the best linebackers to play for Boston University where he graduated in 1964 with a degree in education.

After retiring from professional football, he put his degree to work, teaching gym at Greenfield High School, in Greenfield, Massachusetts.

William W. Budness, son of the late William and Charlotte (Ludwin) Budness died peacefully on January 24, 2018, surrounded by his loved ones at Paradise Senior Living in Georgetown, DE.
