= Mike Eischeid =

American football player (born 1940)

No. 11
- Position: Punter

Personal information
- Born: September 29, 1940 (age 86); Orange City, Iowa, U.S.
- Listed height: 6 ft 0 in (1.83 m)
- Listed weight: 190 lb (86 kg)

Career information
- High school: Fayette (IA)
- College: Upper Iowa
- NFL draft: 1963: undrafted

Career history
- Minnesota Vikings (1963)*; Chicago Bears (1965–1966)*; Oakland Raiders (1966–1971); Minnesota Vikings (1972–1974)
- * Offseason or practice squad member only

Awards and highlights
- AFL champion (1967)

Career NFL statistics
- Punts: 565
- Punting yards: 23,296
- Punting average: 41.2
- Longest punt: 72
- Stats at Pro Football Reference

Michael Dunlop Eischeid (born September 29, 1940) is an American former professional football player who was a punter for nine season in the American Football League (AFL) and National Football League (NFL), from 1966 to 1974. He played college football for the Upper Iowa Peacocks.

== Career ==
Eischeid was the regular punter for the Oakland Raiders from 1966 to 1970, but played in only 2 games in 1971. He was also their regular place kicker in 1966, but only made 11 out of 26 field goals for a 42.3% average, and was replaced the following year by George Blanda. In particular, he punted on the 1967 AFL Champion Raiders and in the second AFL-NFL World Championship Game (Super Bowl II), which the Raiders lost.

He reached his peak average in 1967 with 44.3 yards per punt, second in the AFL, a total that Ray Guy (future punter for the Raiders and eventual inductee into the Pro Football Hall of Fame) surpassed only once in 14 years, but Eischeid's average steadily declined from 1968 to 1970, until he was replaced by Jerry DePoyster in 1971. Then he became the regular punter of the Minnesota Vikings from 1972 to 1974, playing in Super Bowl VIII and Super Bowl IX for the Vikings, both losses. In three Super Bowls, his team lost each time. In AFL and NFC championship games, his teams won 3 (1967, 1973, 1974) and lost one (1969). He holds the record for most career punts in Super Bowls with 17 total punts in 3 games.

== See also ==
- List of American Football League players
