= 1968 American Football League season =

American Football League season

1968 AFL season

Regular season
- Duration: September 6 – December 15, 1968

Playoffs
- Date: December 29, 1968
- Eastern champion: New York Jets
- Western champion: Oakland Raiders
- Site: Shea Stadium, New York City
- Champion: New York Jets

AFL teams: West, East

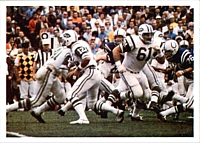
The Jets playing the Colts in Super Bowl III.

The 1968 AFL season was the ninth regular season of the American Football League, and its penultimate season prior to the AFL–NFL merger.

The season ended when the New York Jets (11–3) defeated the Oakland Raiders (12–2) in the AFL championship game on December 29 at Shea Stadium in New York City. Two weeks later, the Jets defeated the National Football League's Baltimore Colts in Super Bowl III in one of the biggest sports upsets in history.

The season was also notable as the inaugural season of the Cincinnati Bengals, which expanded the AFL to ten teams.

In anticipation of the merger, all AFL on-field officials wore uniforms similar to those used in the NFL.

== Division races ==
With the addition of the Cincinnati Bengals, the AFL's ten teams were split equally into two divisions. The Bengals were awarded 40 veteran players in an expansion draft, held in mid-January 1968, and they participated in the 1968 NFL/AFL draft of college players, held in late January.

Each AFL team played a home-and-away game against the other four teams in its division, one game against each of the five teams in the opposite division, and a second game against one of the other division's teams.

As with the previous eight seasons, the best record in the Eastern Division played the best in the Western Division in the AFL championship game, with the site alternating between the divisions; the Eastern division hosted in even-numbered years. If there was tie at the top of either division standings (as happened when Oakland and Kansas City both finished at 12–2), a one-game playoff was held to determine the division winner. The Jets, with the third-best record in the league in 1968, had a week off and hosted the title game.

Week	Eastern	Record	Western	Record
1	Boston	1–0–0	Tie (KC, SD)	1–0–0
2	Tie (Bos, NYJ)	1–0–0	Tie (Oak, SD)	1–0–0
3	N.Y. Jets	2–0–0	Tie (Oak, SD)	2–0–0
4	Tie (Bos, NY)	2–1–0	Oakland	3–0–0
5	N.Y. Jets	3–1–0	Oakland	4–0–0
6	N.Y. Jets	3–2–0	Kansas City	5–1–0
7	N.Y. Jets	4–2–0	Kansas City	6–1–0
8	N.Y. Jets	5–2–0	Kansas City	7–1–0
9	N.Y. Jets	6–2–0	Kansas City	7–2–0
10	N.Y. Jets	7–2–0	Kansas City	8–2–0
11	N.Y. Jets	7–3–0	Kansas City	9–2–0
12	N.Y. Jets	8–3–0	Tie (KC, Oak)	9–2–0
13	N.Y. Jets	9–3–0	Tie (KC, Oak)	10–2–0
14	N.Y. Jets	10–3–0	Tie (KC, Oak)	11–2–0
15	N.Y. Jets	11–3–0	(tie) Kansas City	12–2–0
			Oakland	12–2–0

== Regular season ==
The Cincinnati Bengals joined the league as an expansion team.

=== Results ===
Home/Road		Eastern Division					Western Division				
Home/Road		BOS	BUF	HOU	MIA	NY	CIN	DEN	KC	OAK	SD
Eastern	Boston Patriots		23–6	0–16	10–34	31–47*	33–14	14–35			17–27
Eastern	Buffalo Bills	7–16		7–30	17–21	37–35			7–18	6–48	6–21
Eastern	Houston Oilers	45–17	35–6		7–24	14–20		38–17	21–26	15–24	
Eastern	Miami Dolphins	38–7	14–14	10–24		7–31	21–38		3–48	21–47	
Eastern	New York Jets	48–14	25–21	26–7	35–17		27–14	13–21			23–20
Western	Cincinnati Bengals		34–23	17–27	22–24			24–10	9–16	0–34	10–31
Western	Denver Broncos	17–20	34–32		21–14		10–7		7–30	7–43	23–47
Western	Kansas City Chiefs	31–17		24–10		19–20	13–3	34–2		24–10	27–20
Western	Oakland Raiders	41–10	13–10			43–32	31–10	33–27	38–21		14–23
Western	San Diego Chargers			30–14	34–28	15–37	29–13	55–24	3–40	27–34	

(*) Played at Legion Field, Birmingham, Alabama since Boston Red Sox refused to rent Fenway Park to Patriots.

=== Standings ===
AFL Eastern Division
	W	L	T	PCT	DIV	PF	PA	STK
New York Jets	11	3	0	.786	7–1	419	280	W4
Houston Oilers	7	7	0	.500	5–3	303	248	W2
Miami Dolphins	5	8	1	.385	4–3–1	276	355	L1
Boston Patriots	4	10	0	.286	2–6	229	406	L2
Buffalo Bills	1	12	1	.077	1–6–1	199	367	L8

Note: Tie games were not officially counted in the standings in the AFL.

AFL Western Division
	W	L	T	PCT	DIV	PF	PA	STK
Oakland Raiders	12	2	0	.857	6–2	453	233	W8
Kansas City Chiefs	12	2	0	.857	7–1	371	170	W5
San Diego Chargers	9	5	0	.643	5–3	382	310	L2
Denver Broncos	5	9	0	.357	1–7	275	404	L3
Cincinnati Bengals	3	11	0	.214	1–7	215	329	L3

== Playoffs ==
Western Division playoff December 22			AFL Championship Game; December 29
			E	at New York Jets	27
W	Kansas City Chiefs	6	W	Oakland Raiders	23
W	at Oakland Raiders	41

=== Super Bowl ===
In an upset, the New York Jets, defeated the Baltimore Colts, 16–7, at Orange Bowl in Miami, on January 12, 1969.

== Stadium changes ==
- The expansion Cincinnati Bengals began play at Nippert Stadium.
- Bears Stadium, home of the Denver Broncos, was renamed Mile High Stadium after the city took control of the venue.
- The Houston Oilers moved from Rice Stadium to the Astrodome.

== Coaching changes ==
=== Offseason ===
- Cincinnati Bengals: Paul Brown was the expansion team's first head coach.

=== In-season ===
- Buffalo Bills: Joe Collier was fired after two games; he was replaced by director of player personnel Harvey Johnson.

== See also ==
- Heidi Game
- 1968 NFL season
