= Harry Schuh =

American football player (1942–2013)

No. 79, 76
- Position: Offensive tackle

Personal information
- Born: September 25, 1942; Philadelphia, Pennsylvania, U.S.
- Died: May 20, 2013 (aged 70); Memphis, Tennessee, U.S.
- Listed height: 6 ft 3 in (1.91 m)
- Listed weight: 260 lb (118 kg)

Career information
- High school: Neshaminy (Langhorne, Pennsylvania)
- College: Memphis (1962–1964)
- AFL draft: 1965: 1st round, 3rd overall pick

Career history
- Oakland Raiders (1965–1970); Los Angeles Rams (1971–1973); Green Bay Packers (1974)

Awards and highlights
- AFL champion (1967); First-team All-AFL (1969); Second-team All-AFL (1967, 1968); 2× AFL All-Star (1967, 1969); Pro Bowl (1970); First-team All-American (1963); Second-team All-American (1964); Memphis Tigers No. 79 retired

Career NFL/AFL statistics
- Games played: 140
- Games started: 112
- Fumble recoveries: 5
- Stats at Pro Football Reference

Harry Frederick Schuh (September 25, 1942 – May 20, 2013) was an American professional football offensive tackle who played in the American Football League (AFL) and National Football League (NFL). He started at right offensive tackle for the Oakland Raiders in four consecutive AFL/AFC championship games (1967–1970). He was selected to play in the AFL All-Star Game and/or selected first or second team All-AFL every season from 1967 through 1970. As a college lineman at Memphis State University, he was named an All-American by numerous entities in 1963 and 1964, and played in a number of college all-star games.

== Early life ==
Schuh was born on September 25, 1942, in Philadelphia. He attended Neshaminy High School, in Langhorne, Bucks County, Pennsylvania, where he played on the school's football team. As a junior in 1959, the team was the Lower Bucks County Football League (LBCL) champion. Schuh was a 6 ft 2 in (1.88 m) 214 lb (97.1 kg) fullback on the team. The team had a 28–2–2 record during his three varsity seasons. Schuh led the LBCL in scoring with 84 points in LBCL games; and scored 108 points overall that season. United Press International (UPI) named Schuh second-team All-State in 1959. Schuh had also led the LBCL in scoring as a sophomore (1958) with 60 points in LBCL games, and scored 96 points total in all games in which he played that season.

As a 235 lb (106.6 kg) senior in 1960, Schuh scored 115 points in LBCL games and 133 points overall. He was selected to play for the Pennsylvania high school all-stars in the Big 33 Football Classic. In 1960, Schuh was again selected second-team All-State by UPI, along with being selected to various other All-State teams. Nationally, he was selected to the Wigwam Wisemen of America seventh team National High School All-America Football Team.

Schuh was also on the school's wrestling team as a 224 lb (101.6 kg) senior. In February 1961, he won a division title in the unlimited weight class. He was also on the school's track and field team, as a high jumper.

== College career ==
Schuh had over 60 college scholarship offers and chose to attend Memphis State University (now the University of Memphis). He played college football with the Memphis Tigers. Schuh played fullback on the freshman football team in 1961. As a sophomore (1962), the 250 lb (113.4 kg) Schuh was moved to tackle. After a series of injuries on the team, Schuh was starting at right offensive tackle by the end of September 1962. The team had an 8–1 record that season. As a junior, the now 6 ft 3 in (1.9 m) 270 lb (122.5 kg) Schuh remained a starter at tackle. The Tigers went undefeated, with nine wins and one tie. Before his senior season, Memphis State line coach J. W. Patrick praised Schuh as the best collegiate offensive tackle in the country because of his combination of size and speed. Schuh was primarily an offensive tackle at Memphis State, but would sometimes play defense.

Schuh was named an All-American in 1963 and 1964. In 1963, The Sporting News named him an All-American, as did the Newspaper Enterprise Association (NEA). In 1964, nine different entities named him as an All-American, including among others the NEA, the Associated Press (AP), Time and The Sporting News. UPI named him a second-team All-American at tackle in 1964. Schuh was selected as a Coaches All-American and was an All-American as selected by scouts. He played for the South in the 1964 Blue Gray Game. He also participated in the 1965 All-America East-West game held in Buffalo, New York before the start of the 1965 season. He played in the 1965 Chicago College All Star Game, and coach Otto Graham named Schuh a starter in that game.

== Professional career ==
=== 1965 draft ===
In late November 1964, the Oakland Raiders selected Schuh with the third overall pick in the 1965 AFL draft, after Joe Namath and Larry Elkins. Schuh immediately signed to play for the Raiders, and was not taken in the 1965 NFL draft. This all occurred in the shadow of the battle between the AFL and NFL over signing college players. The Raiders used various tactics to have the first opportunity to speak with Schuh, before NFL representatives could try and convince him to join the NFL. In an effort to keep Schuh's whereabouts unknown, the Raiders chartered a plane to fly Schuh from Jackson, Mississippi to New Orleans where his wife and baby were waiting (having been flown in from Memphis). The Raiders then flew the young family to Las Vegas to meet with Raiders assistant coach John Rauch, team executives and eventually head coach Al Davis. Representatives of the Los Angeles Rams learned of his location and cornered Schuh at a Las Vegas casino, but the Raiders representatives were able to divert Schuh from meeting with the Rams' people; and they ultimately flew Schuh to Hawaii. During this process, Schuh spoke with Raiders' coach Davis, who so impressed Schuh that he knew within five minutes of talking to Davis he would sign with the Raiders. He was still in Hawaii when the Raiders drafted him, and reportedly he signed a contract with the team 15 minutes later. After this adventure, Schuh was described as "the first college kid ever pirated out of the continental United States in the frantic war between the American and National football leagues".

=== Oakland Raiders ===
Schuh started eight of the 14 games in which he played for the Raiders during his rookie season (1965), under head coach Al Davis. He started the first game of his rookie season at right offensive tackle, facing Kansas City Chiefs' defensive end Jerry Mays; one of the AFL's best ends. Mays originally had Schuh off balance, but with guidance from 1964 starting left tackle Frank Youso and line coach Ollie Spencer during the game, Schuh improved and held his own against Mays. Schuh's improved play turned the game around, and the Raiders won 37–10. After his second game of the season, against the San Diego Chargers, Chargers' All-AFL left defensive end Earl Faison observed Schuh's significant improvement since they met in the pre-season just weeks earlier. Youso replaced Schuh as a starter at right tackle during the season, with Schuh returning as a starter when Youso was injured.

In 1966, Schuh started all 14 games at right tackle; now playing under head coach John Rauch. In 1967, he again started all 14 games at right tackle. He was selected to play in the AFL All-Star Game. The UPI and NEA named Schuh first-team All-AFL. The Associated Press and The Sporting News named him second-team All-AFL. The Raiders won the AFL Championship in 1967, defeating the Houston Oilers 40–7; with Schuh starting the game at right tackle.

On January 14, 1968, the Raiders played the Green Bay Packers in the second AFL-NFL World Championship Game (Super Bowl II), losing 33–14. The game was already being called the Super Bowl in the media, but the NFL did not adopt that term officially until Super Bowl V. The Raiders' attitude was generally that they had learned much from playing the game with the Packers, Schuh being quoted as saying that "Age and experience were the difference". Schuh started at right tackle and directly played against the Packers future Hall of Fame left defensive end Willie Davis that day. The 32-year old Davis, in his 10th NFL season, gave Schuh a difficult time as the game progressed, once Davis learned Schuh's technique as an offensive lineman. Schuh recalled Davis hitting him "with a shiver with the palm of his hand into my chest and ran over me like a steamroller".

In 1968, Schuh again started all 14 games at right tackle for the Raiders. The AP, UPI and NEA each named Schuh second-team All-AFL that season. The Raiders reached the AFL championship game, losing to the New York Jets, 27–23. Schuh started the game at right tackle, facing Jets left defensive end Gerry Philbin, a consensus first-team ALL-AFL player that season. He started all 14 games again in 1969, and was once more selected to play in the AFL All-Star Game. He was named first team All-AFL by the AP, UPI and Pro Football Weekly, and second-team All-AFL by the NEA and The Sporting News. The Raiders again reached the AFL championship game, losing to the Kansas City Chiefs, 17–7; with Schuh facing off against Mays.

In 1970, Schuh started 13 of the 14 games in which he played. Oakland now played in the American Football Conference, after the AFL–NFL merger. Schuh was selected to play for the AFC in his first Pro Bowl. Pro Football Weekly named him first-team All-AFC, and UPI named him second-team All-AFC. The Raiders reached the AFC championship game, losing to the Baltimore Colts, 27–17. Schuh faced Colts' left defensive end Bubba Smith in that game.

=== Los Angeles Rams and Green Back Packers ===
Schuh was traded before the 1971 season to the Los Angeles Rams, along with defensive back Kent McCloughan, for his replacement at right tackle, Bob Brown, an eventual member of the Pro Football Hall of Fame. He started all 14 games at right tackle for the Rams in 1971 and 1972. In 1972, the Rams set a then team record of 2,209 rushing yards. In February 1973, Schuh was still recovering from knee surgery he had a year earlier, stating that although he was 30-years old he felt like he was 45, and simply wanted to be able to play without pain in the upcoming season.

In 1973, Schuh lost his starting right tackle position to John Williams, and did not start in any of the 14 games in which he played that season. Schuh replaced left tackle Charlie Cowan during a November 25 game against the New Orleans Saints after Cowan suffered heat prostration. Rams' running back Lawrence McCutcheon continued to run behind an aggressive Schuh and left guard Tom Mack, reaching 152 yards rushing in the game; with the Rams totaling 340 rushing yards in the game.

The Rams traded Schuh to the Green Bay Packers for an undisclosed draft choice before the start of the 1974 season. Schuh finished his career with the Packers in 1974, starting seven games at left tackle, of the 14 games in which he played. He was described during the season as one of the brighter spots on a bleak Packers offensive line situation. Schuh announced his retirement in July 1975.

== Legacy and honors ==
The Raiders' 1970 starting offensive line included three future Hall of Famers, Jim Otto at center, Gene Upshaw at left guard and Art Shell at left tackle. Schuh played with Otto for his six years in Oakland. The Raiders' offensive line from 1968 to 1970 is considered among the best offensive lines in NFL history. He was a member of the Raiders' All-Time Team.

In 1981, he was inducted into the University of Memphis’ M Club Hall of Fame. In 1989, he was inducted into the Tennessee Sports Hall of Fame. The University of Memphis retired his No. 79 on October 15, 2011, only the fifth person at the time to receive this honor. He is also a member of the Pennsylvania Sports Hall of Fame and Neshaminy Football Hall of Fame.

== Personal life and death ==
After retirement, Schuh lived in Memphis and worked for a freight company. He later worked with Dean Lotz as part of a well-known personal fitness training business in Memphis.

Schuh died in Memphis, Tennessee on May 20, 2013.
