= Tom Keating (American football) =

American football player (1942–2012)

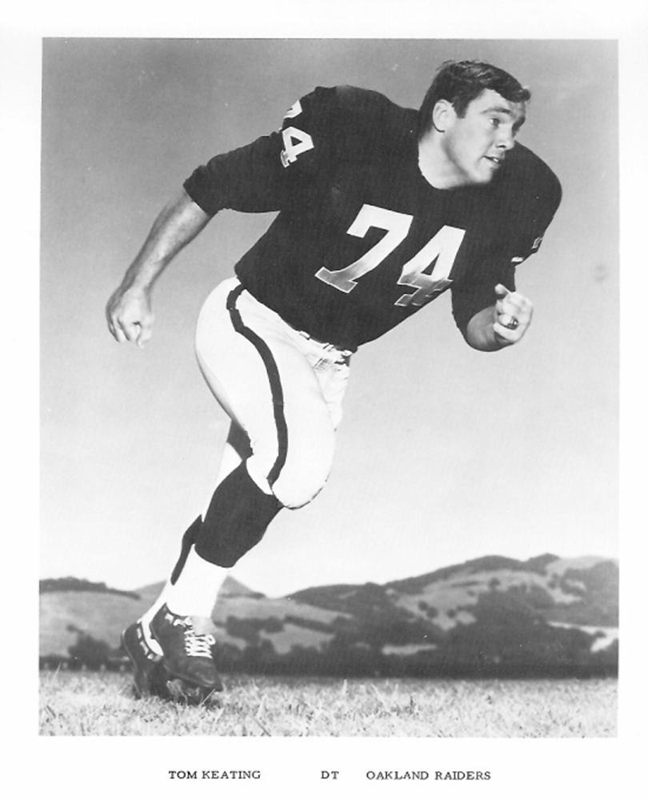
- Keating in 1969

No. 74
- Position: Defensive tackle

Personal information
- Born: September 2, 1942; Chicago, Illinois, U.S.
- Died: August 31, 2012 (aged 69); Denver, Colorado, U.S.
- Listed height: 6 ft 2 in (1.88 m)
- Listed weight: 247 lb (112 kg)

Career information
- High school: St. Mel (Chicago)
- College: Michigan (1961–1963)
- NFL draft: 1964: 4th round, 53rd overall pick
- AFL draft: 1964: 5th round, 34th overall pick

Career history
- Buffalo Bills (1964–1965); Oakland Raiders (1966–1972); Pittsburgh Steelers (1973); Kansas City Chiefs (1974–1975)

Awards and highlights
- 3× AFL champion (1964, 1965, 1967); First-team All-AFL (1967); Second-team All-AFL (1966, 1969); 2× AFL All-Star (1966, 1967); AFL All-Time Second Team; First-team All-Big Ten (1963)

Career AFL/NFL statistics
- Fumble recoveries: 5
- Stats at Pro Football Reference

Thomas Arthur Keating (September 2, 1942 – August 31, 2012) was an American professional football defensive tackle. He played college football for the Michigan Wolverines from 1961 to 1963 and played 12 seasons in the American Football League (AFL) and National Football League (NFL) from 1964 to 1975. He was an AFL All-Star in 1966 and 1967, a key to the 1967 Oakland Raiders' defensive line that led the team to a 13–1 record and the 1967 AFL Championship, and was considered "the premier tackle in the old American Football League". He was known for his use of a distinctive four-point stance in which he lined up with both hands on the ground.

== Early life ==
Keating was born in Chicago in 1942. He attended St. Mel High School in Chicago.

== College career ==
Keating enrolled at the University of Michigan in 1960 and played college football at the tackle position on head coach Bump Elliott's Michigan Wolverines football teams from 1961 to 1963. As a junior, he started eight of nine games at left tackle for the 1962 Michigan Wolverines football team that compiled a 2–7 record and finished in last place in the Big Ten Conference. As a senior, he started all nine games at left tackle and was selected as the Most Valuable Player on the 1963 Michigan Wolverines football team that compiled a 3-4-2 record and finished in fifth place in the Big Ten Conference.

== Professional career ==
=== Buffalo Bills ===
Keating was selected by the Kansas City Chiefs in the fifth round (34th overall pick) of the 1964 American Football League draft. The Buffalo Bills immediately traded for him because Bills' management and ownership firmly believed that they could sign Tom and not lose him to the NFL. The strategy paid off in May 1964 when Tom signed with the Bills. He spent the 1964 and 1965 AFL seasons as a backup player for the Bills, appearing in three games in 1964 and six games in 1965.

=== Oakland Raiders ===
Keating joined the Oakland Raiders for the 1966 AFL season. He earned AFL All-Star honors with the Raider in 1966 and 1967. He was the starting right tackle for the Raiders' 1967 AFL Championship victory over the Houston Oilers as well as their Super Bowl II loss to the Green Bay Packers. Keating anchored a defensive line for the 1967 Raiders team that finished with the fewest yards rushing and the fewest rushing yards per attempt in the AFL, as well as third in fewest passing yards and second fewest points allowed. The front four of Keating, Dan Birdwell, Ike Lassiter, and Ben Davidson contributed to the team's total of 67 sacks and 666 yards lost against the opposing offense. He played for the Raiders through 1972. He was considered "the premier tackle in the old American Football League" until he was slowed by a series of leg injuries.

=== Pittsburgh Steelers ===
In July 1973, the Raiders traded Keating to the Pittsburgh Steelers for an undisclosed 1974 draft pick. Keating appeared in 12 games, four as a starter, for the Steelers during the 1973 NFL season.

=== Kansas City Chiefs ===
In September 1974, Keating signed with the Kansas City Chiefs. He became a starter for the Chiefs during the 1974 NFL season, appearing in 14 games, including 12 as the team's starting left tackle, replacing Curley Culp, who was traded to the Houston Oilers. He concluded his football career with the Chiefs in 1975, appearing in nine games, four as a starter.

== Later life and family ==
He was one of the fifteen plaintiffs in Mackey v. National Football League in which Judge Earl R. Larson declared that the Rozelle rule was a violation of antitrust laws on December 30, 1975.

After retiring from football, Keating worked as a private investigator for a law firm and later opened his own agency in Walnut Creek, California. He maintained his primary residence in the Bay Area, but began spending several months a year in Limoux in the south of France.

Keating had three sons, James Alexander Keating, Patrick Gould and Ryan Gould. Keating's younger brother, Bill Keating, also played football for the University of Michigan and in the American Football League.

Keating died from prostate cancer in 2012 at a hospice in Denver, Colorado. Postmortem, Keating was diagnosed with chronic traumatic encephalopathy. He was one of at least 345 NFL players to be diagnosed after death with this disease, which is caused by repeated hits to the head.
