= Ike Lassiter =

American football player (1940–2015)

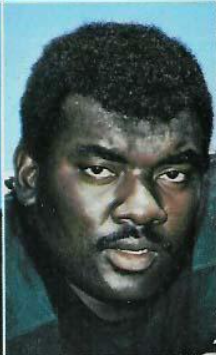
- Lassiter in 1969

No. 73, 77, 87
- Position: Defensive end

Personal information
- Born: November 15, 1940; Wilson, North Carolina, U.S.
- Died: February 15, 2015 (aged 74); Oakland, California, U.S.
- Listed height: 6 ft 5 in (1.96 m)
- Listed weight: 270 lb (122 kg)

Career information
- High school: Charles H. Darden (Wilson)
- College: St. Augustine's
- NFL draft: 1962: 9th round, 115th overall pick

Career history
- Denver Broncos (1962–1964); Oakland Raiders (1965–1969); Boston / New England Patriots (1970–1971); Washington Redskins (1972)*; Jacksonville Sharks (1974)
- * Offseason or practice squad member only

Awards and highlights
- AFL champion (1967); 2× Second-team All-AFL (1966, 1969); AFL All-Star (1966); AFL sacks leader (1967); AFL record: Most sacks in a season: 17 (1967)

Career AFL/NFL statistics
- Sacks: 74.5
- Fumble recoveries: 3
- Interceptions: 1
- Stats at Pro Football Reference

Isaac "Ike" Thomas Lassiter (November 15, 1940 – February 15, 2015) was an American football defensive end who played in the American Football League (AFL) for the Denver Broncos and the Oakland Raiders, where he was an AFL All-Star in 1966 and second-team All-AFL twice. His unofficial 17 quarterback sacks in 1967 is the AFL record for sacks by a player in a single season. He then played in the National Football League (NFL) with the Boston / New England Patriots for two seasons. He finally played in the World Football League (WFL) with the Jacksonville Sharks for one year.

== Early life ==
Lassiter was born on November 15, 1940, in Wilson, North Carolina. He was the oldest of nine children, born to Dempsey and Mary Jane (Bynum) Lassiter. He attended Charles H. Darden High School, where he starred on the football team.

== College career ==
Lassiter received a football scholarship to attend Saint Augustine College in Raleigh, North Carolina. He did not imagine a career in professional football, as he did not believe he could compete with the NFL athletes he saw on television. However, his Saint Augustine coach George Quiett convinced Lassiter he should try to become a professional player. He was invited to play in the December 1961 All American Bowl in Tucson, Arizona.

Lassiter received a Bachelor of Arts degree in physical education, with a minor in psychology.

== Professional career ==
=== Denver Broncos ===
The NFL's Los Angeles Rams selected Lassiter in the ninth round of the 1962 NFL draft, 115th overall. He signed with the Rams. He did not make the Rams team that included, among others, a rookie Merlin Olsen at defensive tackle and first year player David "Deacon" Jones at defensive end (both of whom would make the Pro Football Hall of Fame). After only three weeks in the Rams training camp, he joined the AFL's Denver Broncos.

Lassiter started five of the 14 games in which he played for the Broncos in 1962, playing left defensive end. He had two quarterback sacks. The next season, he started all seven games in which he played, with 3.5 sacks. In 1964, he played in only two games for the Broncos, starting one game and having one sack. By 1964, Lassiter perceived himself to be the subject of unduly harsh treatment by the Broncos coaches; including being subjected to ridicule in front of other players. He became embittered and was released during the 1964 season.

=== Oakland Raiders ===
After being released by the Broncos, Lassiter originally gave up on playing professional football. However, when the next season came around, he missed playing. Based on what he had heard about Raiders head coach Al Davis treating players with respect, Lassiter wrote to Davis asking for an opportunity to play for the Raiders. Davis called Lassiter and told him to come to the Raiders camp, in playing shape. Lassiter went from 300 pounds to 280 pounds before joining the Raiders. He not only made the 1965 Raiders, Davis started Lassiter in all 14 games at left defensive end. Lassiter led the Raiders with eight sacks that season, tied for fourth most in the AFL. Lassiter later called Davis his "Billy Graham ... because he saved my soul".

In 1966, Lassiter again started all 14 Raiders' games at left defensive end. He had 10 sacks (tied for the team lead with left defensive tackle Dan Birdwell) and one interception. Their 10 sacks were third most in the AFL. He was selected to play in the January 1967 AFL All-Star Game, along with Raiders' right defensive end Ben Davidson and right defensive tackle Tom Keating; and was named second-team All-AFL by the Associated Press (AP), as was Keating. The Raiders led the AFL with 36 sacks.

In the 1967 regular season the Raiders team had a won–lost record of 13–1. Lassiter led the Raiders with 17 sacks, the most by any player in the AFL. Sacks did not become an official statistic until 1982, but unofficially, Lassiter's 17 sacks were the most in a single season during the AFL's 10-year history. In 1967, Birdwell had 14.5 sacks, Davidson and Keating each had nine, and right linebacker Gus Otto had 8.5. In a mid-October game against the Buffalo Bills, they sacked Bills' quarterback Jack Kemp 11 times. Overall, the Raiders combined for a league-leading total of 67 sacks and 665 yards lost that season, the 67 sacks being the record in a 14–game season and the total yards lost an all-time record. The all-time record for sacks is 72, accomplished by the 1984 Chicago Bears in a 16–game season.

The Raiders defeated the Houston Oilers, 40–7 in the 1967 AFL championship game. Lassiter considered this game his biggest thrill as a player. The Green Bay Packers defeated the Raiders in Super Bowl II, 33–14. Lassiter played as the starting left defensive end in the Super Bowl, opposite future Hall of Fame right tackle Forrest Gregg.

The Raiders 1967 defense was known as "the eleven angry men". New York Jets future Hall of Fame quarterback Joe Namath suffered a broken jaw in a December 17 loss to the Raiders, 38–29. It was originally believed that this came on a famous play where Davidson viciously hit Namath and Namath's helmet flew off of his head. However, the injury was suffered earlier in the game on a big hit from Lassiter. Raiders' owner Al Davis said later that Lassiter was upset Davidson got the credit. Lassiter himself said it was him and not Davidson who broke Namath's jaw, but that he had more respect for Namath than many other of the top quarterbacks of his era, because "He'd take your best shot. He didn't duck like a lot of quarterbacks. ... but Namath would hold the ball until the final second and stand up to you".

In 1968, Lassiter led the team with 11.5 sacks, and the Raiders led the AFL with 49 sacks. The Raiders set an all-time record in leading the AFL in sacks from 1966 to 1968. Lassiter finished second in the AFL in sacks, behind only the New York Jets' Gerry Philbin (14). He played in the November 17 Raiders' 43–32 victory over the Jets. In the third quarter, Lassiter and Davidson had sacked Namath to stop a Jets' drive that had reached the Raiders' 15-yard line. In the fourth quarter, the Jets took a 32–29 lead with a little over one minute left in the game. The Raiders came back to score two touchdowns in less than one minute to win the game. The game was nationally televised, but the last minute of the game was preempted on television by the children's movie Heidi; and those who had been watching the game missed seeing the Raiders' comeback. The game became known as the Heidi Game.

The Raiders finished the 1968 season 12–2. They defeated the Kansas City Chiefs, 41–6 in the first round of the playoffs; but lost to the Jets in the AFL championship game, 27–23. Lassiter had ½ sack in that game. The Jets came from behind in the fourth quarter to win the championship game. At the time, Lassiter was in shock from that loss for two days, and it stuck with him for years.

In 1969, Lassiter had 15 sacks with the Raiders, second in the AFL to Steve DeLong's 15.5. Lassiter was selected second-team All-AFL by the AP, United Press International (UPI), and Pro Football Weekly. The Raiders finished the season 12–1–1. They defeated the Oilers in the first round of the playoffs 56–7. Lassiter had three sacks in that game. The Kansas City Chiefs, whom the Raiders had defeated twice in the regular season, beat the Raiders in the 1969 AFL championship game, 17–7. Lassiter recovered a fumble in that game. Like the Jets a year earlier, the Chiefs went on to win the Super Bowl. The Raiders’ 47 sacks that season were second only to the Chiefs (48) in the AFL.

=== Boston/New England Patriots ===
At the end of August 1970, the Raiders traded Lassiter to the Boston Patriots for an undisclosed 1971 draft pick. In the first game of the 1970 season, the Patriots' defensive line of Lassiter (left end), Jim Lee Hunt (left tackle), Ron Berger (right tackle) and Houston Antwine (right end) set a Patriot team record with eight sacks. Lassiter started and played in only five games in 1970, with 3.5 sacks, before suffering a season-ending injury. He started 12 games in 1971 at left defensive end with the renamed New England Patriots, with three sacks.

=== End of playing career ===
Lassiter was traded to the Washington Redskins in 1972 for an undisclosed draft pick. Washington released him in early August 1972. He sat out the next two seasons, but played for the Jacksonville Sharks in 1974 in the World Football League. He was the Sharks' player representative.

== Legacy and honors ==
Lassiter started every Oakland Raider game at left defensive end from 1965 to 1969. He had 61.5 sacks during that span. From 1966 to 1969, he had at least 10 sacks per season, and twice had 15 or more sacks during that time. He also had 3.5 sacks during the Raiders' playoffs between 1967 and 1969. In commenting on his football career, he often said "Once a Raider, Always a Raider".

In 2022, he was inducted into the Saint Augustine University Athletic Hall of Fame.

== Personal life and death ==
The 1970 trade sending Lassiter to Boston occurred just weeks before his wife was due to have a baby, and Lassiter considered retiring. His wife was in California, where he also had an insurance business, and he was concerned about leaving her. He decided to play after discussing the issue with Patriots' coach Clive Rush.

After retiring from football Lassiter stayed in Oakland. He taught in the Oakland Unified School District. He also worked as a counselor at Peralta College East Bay Skills Center, and coached football at Merritt College, as well as for a semi-professional team (the Fairfield Flyers). Lassiter also worked with an auto dealership in Oakland. He also served his local church in Oakland during his life there.

He retired from work to take care of his wife Sandra, who was ill and predeceased him. Lassiter died on February 15, 2015. He was survived by three daughters and three grandchildren.

== See also ==
- List of American Football League players
