= Dan Birdwell =

American football player (born 1940)

No. 53
- Position: Defensive lineman

Personal information
- Born: October 14, 1940; Big Spring, Texas, U.S.
- Died: February 14, 1978 (aged 37); Huntington Beach, California, U.S.
- Listed height: 6 ft 4 in (1.93 m)
- Listed weight: 250 lb (113 kg)

Career information
- High school: Big Spring
- College: Houston
- NFL draft: 1962: 5th round, 66th overall pick
- AFL draft: 1962: 6th round, 41st overall pick

Career history
- Oakland Raiders (1962–1969)

Awards and highlights
- AFL champion (1967); AFL All-Star (1968)

Career AFL statistics
- Fumble recoveries: 2
- Interceptions: 3
- Sacks: 32.5
- Stats at Pro Football Reference

Dan Birdwell (October 14, 1940 – February 14, 1978) was an American college and professional football player. A defensive lineman, he played collegiately for the University of Houston and professionally for the Oakland Raiders of the American Football League (AFL) from 1962 to 1969. He was the starting left defensive tackle with Tom Keating on the right side for the 1967 AFL Champion Raiders with their 13–1 win–loss record, which saw them win the 1967 AFL Championship, their first league championship in team history. They played for the AFL in the second AFL-NFL World Championship game, which they lost 33–14. In that season, the front four of Birdwell, Keating, Ike Lassiter, and Ben Davidson combined for impressive totals of 67 sacks and 666 yards lost; unofficially, Birdwell had 14.5 sacks, a career high that topped his ten from the previous season.

An eccentric character as described by his teammates, Birdwell is credited with the following quote regarding the necessary mindset to play professional football: "You have to play this game like somebody just hit your mother with a two by four."

Birdwell died of a massive heart attack at age 37 on February 14, 1978. It was reported that he had previously had been ill since with fever, aches and pains and other flu‐like symptoms days prior to his death.

== See also ==
- List of American Football League players
