= Super Bowl II =

1968 Edition of the Super Bowl

| Green Bay Packers (NFL) (9–4–1) | Oakland Raiders (AFL) (13–1) |
|---|---|
| 33 | 14 |
| Head coach: Vince Lombardi | Head coach: John Rauch |
| | 1 | 2 | 3 | 4 | Total |
|---|---|---|---|---|---|
| GB | 3 | 13 | 10 | 7 | 33 |
| OAK | 0 | 7 | 0 | 7 | 14 |
- Date: January 14, 1968
- Kickoff time: 3:05 p.m. EST (UTC-5)
- Stadium: Miami Orange Bowl; Miami, Florida
- MVP: Bart Starr, quarterback
- Favorite: Packers by 14
- Referee: Jack Vest
- Attendance: 75,546

Ceremonies
- National anthem: Grambling College Band
- Coin toss: Jack Vest
- Halftime show: Grambling College Band

TV in the United States
- Network: CBS
- Announcers: Ray Scott, Pat Summerall, and Jack Kemp
- Nielsen ratings: 36.8 (est. 39.12 million viewers)
- Market share: 68
- Cost of 30-second commercial: $54,000

Radio in the United States
- Network: CBS Radio
- Announcers: Jack Drees, Tom Hedrick

The second AFL–NFL World Championship Game (known retroactively as Super Bowl II) was an American football game played on January 14, 1968, at the Orange Bowl in Miami, Florida. The National Football League (NFL)'s defending champion Green Bay Packers defeated American Football League (AFL) champion Oakland Raiders by the score of 33–14, winning their second Super Bowl. This game and the following year's are the only two Super Bowls played in the same stadium in consecutive seasons.

Coming into the game, much like during the first Super Bowl, many sports writers and fans believed that any team in the NFL was vastly superior to any club in the AFL. The Packers, the defending champions, posted a 9–4–1 record during the 1967 NFL season before defeating the Los Angeles Rams 28–7 in the first round of the playoffs, then outlasted the Dallas Cowboys 21–17 in the frigid NFL Championship Game (popularly known as the Ice Bowl). The Raiders finished the regular season at 13–1, then defeated the Houston Oilers 40–7 in the AFL Championship Game.

As expected, the Packers dominated the Raiders throughout the majority of Super Bowl II. The Raiders could only score two touchdown passes from quarterback Daryle Lamonica. Meanwhile, Packers kicker Don Chandler made four field goals, including three in the first half, while cornerback Herb Adderley had a 60-yard interception return for a touchdown that put the game away. Packers quarterback Bart Starr was named the MVP for the second straight time, becoming the first back-to-back Super Bowl MVP for his 13 of 24 passes for 202 yards and one touchdown.

The Packers won their third consecutive World Championship, the second three-peat in NFL history (the 1929–31 Green Bay Packers did it first), and remain the only franchise to accomplish such a feat. The 1965–67 Packers became the first and only team to win three consecutive championship games, as there were no NFL playoff games from 1920 to 1932. No NFL team has accomplished this feat since. Until the 49ers did it in 1989, this would remain the last time that an NFL/NFC won back-to-back Super Bowls.

== Background ==
=== Host selection process ===
The NFL awarded Super Bowl II to Miami on May 25, 1967, at the owners meetings in New York City. It marked the first of eleven Super Bowls in the Miami area (as of 2022), and the first of two consecutive (II and III). A total of five cities were considered to host the second edition: Miami, Los Angeles (Coliseum), Houston (Astrodome), Dallas (Cotton Bowl), and New Orleans (Tulane Stadium). After lackluster attendance for Super Bowl I at the Coliseum, Los Angeles was eliminated by the owners. The Miami Orange Bowl was selected for the game, based on weather, hotel accommodations, capacity, and the stadium's previous experience in hosting the Playoff Bowl. The local Orange Bowl committee had even once (unsuccessfully) lobbied to host the NFL Championship Game, which was not normally a neutral field contest. Furthermore, NFL Commissioner Pete Rozelle opined that it was "helpful to move the game around a little", and not play it in the same city every year. Playing the game in an AFL town also established a precedent for maintaining competitive balance between the two leagues. The city's contingent, led by mayor Robert King High, Joe Robbie, and others, would have just under eight months to prepare for the event.

=== Green Bay Packers ===
The Packers advanced to their second straight AFL–NFL World Championship Game, but had a much more difficult time than in the previous season. Both of their starting running backs from the previous year, future Pro Football Hall of Famers Paul Hornung and Jim Taylor, had left the team. Their replacements, Elijah Pitts and Jim Grabowski, both went down with season-ending injuries, forcing Green Bay coach Vince Lombardi to use second-year reserve running back Donny Anderson and rookie Travis Williams. Fullbacks Chuck Mercein and Ben Wilson, who were signed as free agents after being discarded by many other teams, were also used to help compensate for the loss of Hornung and Taylor. Meanwhile, the team's 33-year-old veteran quarterback Bart Starr had missed 4 games during the season with injuries, and finished the season with nearly twice as many interceptions (17) as touchdown passes (9).

The team's deep threat was provided by veteran receivers Carroll Dale, who recorded 35 receptions for 738 yards (a 21.1 average), and 5 touchdowns; and Pro Bowler Boyd Dowler, who had 54 catches for 846 yards and 4 touchdowns. The Packers still had the superb blocking of guard Jerry Kramer, Fred Thurston and Forrest Gregg. Grabowski was the team's leading rusher with 466 yards, while Wilson had 453. Anderson had 733 yards from scrimmage and 9 total touchdowns, while also gaining another 324 yards returning kicks. On special teams, Williams returned 18 kickoffs for 749 yards and an NFL record 4 touchdowns, giving him a whopping 41.1 yards per return average. The team ranked just 9th out of 16 NFL teams in scoring with 332 points.

The Packers defense, however, allowed only 209 points, the 3rd best in the NFL. Even this figure was misleading, since Green Bay had yielded only 131 points in the first 11 games (when they clinched their division), the lowest total in professional football. Three members of Green Bay's secondary, the strongest aspect of their defense, were named to the Pro Bowl: Willie Wood, Herb Adderley, and Bob Jeter. The Packers also had a superb defensive line led by Henry Jordan and Willie Davis. Behind them, the Packers linebacking corps was led by Ray Nitschke.

The Packers won the NFL's Central Division with a 9–4–1 regular season record, clinching the division in the 11th week of the season. During the last three weeks, the Packers gave up an uncharacteristic total of 78 points, after having yielded only about a dozen points per game in their first 11 contests. In the playoffs, Green Bay returned to its dominant form, blowing away their first playoff opponent, the Los Angeles Rams, in the Western Conference Championship Game, 28–7. The next week, Green Bay then came from behind to defeat the Dallas Cowboys in the NFL championship game for the second year in a row, in one of the most famous games in NFL lore: The Ice Bowl.

=== Oakland Raiders ===
The Raiders, led by head coach John Rauch, had stormed to the top of the AFL with a 13–1 regular season record, the best record in AFL history (their only defeat was an October 7 loss to the New York Jets, 27–14), and went on to crush the Houston Oilers, 40–7, in the AFL Championship game. They had led all AFL and NFL teams in scoring with 468 points. Starting quarterback Daryle Lamonica had thrown for 3,228 yards and an AFL-best 30 touchdown passes.

The offensive line was anchored by center Jim Otto and rookie guard Gene Upshaw, along with AFL All-Stars Harry Schuh and Wayne Hawkins. Wide receiver Fred Biletnikoff led the team with 40 receptions for 876 yards, an average of 21.3 yards per catch. On the other side of the field, tight end Billy Cannon caught 32 passes for 629 yards and scored 10 touchdowns. In the backfield, the Raiders had three running backs, Clem Daniels, Hewritt Dixon, and Pete Banaszak, who carried the ball equally and combined for 1,510 yards and 10 touchdowns. On special teams, defensive back Rodger Bird led the AFL with 612 punt return yards and added another 148 yards returning kickoffs.

The main strength of the Raiders was their defense, nicknamed "The 11 Angry Men". The defensive line was anchored by AFL All-Stars Tom Keating and Ben Davidson, a former Packer who played on Green Bay's 1961 championship team. Davidson was an extremely effective pass rusher who had demonstrated his aggressiveness in a regular season game against the New York Jets by breaking the jaw of Jets quarterback Joe Namath while sacking him. Behind them, All AFL linebacker Dan Conners excelled at blitzing and pass coverage, recording 3 interceptions. The Raiders also had two All AFL defensive backs: Willie Brown, who led the team with 7 interceptions, and Kent McCloughan, who had 2 interceptions. Safety Warren Powers recorded 6 interceptions, returning them for 154 yards and 2 touchdowns.

=== Super Bowl pregame news and notes ===
Despite Oakland's accomplishments, and expert consensus that this was the weakest of all the Packer NFL championship teams, Green Bay was a 14-point favorite to win the Super Bowl. Like the previous year, most fans and sports writers believed that the top NFL teams were superior to the best AFL teams.

Thus, most of the drama and discussions surrounding the game focused not on which team would win, but on the rumors that Lombardi might retire from coaching after the game. The game also proved to be the final one for Packers wide receiver Max McGee, one of the heroes of Super Bowl I, and place kicker Don Chandler.

This was the first Super Bowl to use the "tuning fork" or "slingshot" goalposts (with one supporting post instead of two) invented by Jim Trimble and Joel Rottman; they had made their debut at the start of the season for both the AFL and NFL, and first appeared at the pro level in Canada.

== Broadcasting ==
The game was televised in the United States by CBS. This was the first of seventeen Super Bowls in which the game was rotated annually between CBS and NBC. Ray Scott handled the play-by-play duties, and was joined by color commentators Pat Summerall and Jack Kemp in the broadcast booth. Kemp was the first Super Bowl commentator who was still an active player (with Buffalo of the AFL) at the time of the broadcast. The CBS telecast of this game was considered lost; all that survived were in-game photos, most of which were shown in the January 8, 1969, edition of Sports Illustrated. Not even NFL Films, the league's official filmmaker, had a copy of the full game available; however, they did have game footage that they used for their game highlight film. Super Bowl II was aired exclusively by CBS and was reported to be in the NFL Films vaults as of 2010, but in 2016 the NFL reported they do not have the broadcast.

While the Orange Bowl was sold out for the game, the NFL's unconditional blackout rules in place then prevented the live telecast from being shown in the Miami area.

During the latter part of the second quarter, and again for three minutes of halftime, almost 80 percent of the country (with the exceptions of New York City, Cleveland, Philadelphia and much of the Northeast) lost the video feed of the CBS broadcast. CBS, who had paid $2.5 million for broadcast rights, blamed the glitch on a breakdown in AT&T cable lines.

39.12 million people in the US watched the game on television, resulting in a rating of 36.8 and a market share of 68. The overnight Arbitron rating was 43.

== Ceremonies and entertainment ==
The pregame ceremonies featured two giant figures, one dressed as a Packers player and the other dressed as a Raiders player. They appeared on opposite ends of the field and then faced each other near the 50-yard line.

The Grambling College Tiger Marching Band performed the national anthem as well as during the halftime show. The band was part of the halftime show of Super Bowl I the previous year.

== Game summary ==
=== First quarter ===
The game kicked off at 3:05 p.m. EST. On Oakland's first offensive play, Green Bay linebacker Ray Nitschke shot through a gap and upended fullback Hewritt Dixon by himself in what was one of Nitschke's signature plays of his entire career. The hit was so vicious, it prompted Jerry Green, a Detroit News columnist sitting in the press box with fellow journalists, to say in a deadpan, that the game was over. After forcing the Raiders to punt, the Packers scored with kicker Don Chandler's 39-yard field goal after marching 34 yards on their first drive of the game, giving Green Bay an early 3-0 lead. The Raiders picked up three first downs on their second drive, which included a pass interference penalty called on Nitschke, but they could not reach field goal range and were forced to punt back to the Packers. Green Bay started their next drive from their own 3-yard line. On their third play quarterback Bart Starr completed a 17-yard pass to wide receiver Carroll Dale and four plays later rushed for 14 yards while escaping a sack by defensive end Ben Davidson and defensive tackle Tom Keating. The Packers also elected to convert 4th-and-inches at the Raiders' 35-yard line, and fullback Ben Wilson picked up 5 yards and the fifth first down of the drive to end the quarter.

=== Second quarter ===
Despite Green Bay's excellent field position, their drive stalled at the 13-yard line, forcing them to settle for a 20-yard field goal by Chandler to take a 6–0 lead. Less than two minutes later after forcing an Oakland three-and-out, the Packers took the ball on their own 38-yard line. Raiders cornerback Kent McCloughan jammed Packers wide receiver Boyd Dowler at the line of scrimmage, but then allowed him to head downfield, thinking that a safety would pick him up. However, McCloughan and safety Howie Williams were both influenced by the Packer running backs who were executing a "flood" pattern, with halfback Travis Williams and Wilson running pass routes to the same side as Dowler. Dowler ran a quick post and was wide open down the middle. He grabbed Starr's pass well behind linebacker Dan Conners, and safety Rodger Bird could not get over quickly enough. Dowler outran the defense to score on a 62-yard touchdown reception, increasing the Packers' lead to 13–0. Green Bay became the first team in a Super Bowl to score on its first three possessions on offense.

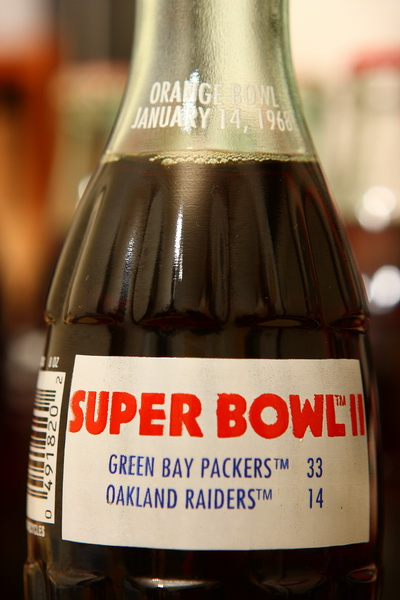
A commemorative Coca-Cola bottle produced in 1994

After being completely dominated until this point, the Raiders offense finally struck back on their next possession, advancing 79 yards in 9 plays, and scoring on a 23-yard touchdown pass from quarterback Daryle Lamonica to wide receiver Bill Miller, cutting the Raiders' deficit to 13–7. The score seemed to fire up the Raiders' defense, and they forced the Packers to punt on their next drive. Bird gave the Raiders great field position with a 12-yard return to Green Bay's 40-yard line, but Oakland could only gain 1 yard with their next three plays and came up empty when kicker/backup quarterback George Blanda's 46-yard field goal attempt fell short of the goal posts. Oakland's defense again forced Green Bay to punt after three plays on the ensuing drive, but this time after calling for a fair catch, Bird fumbled punter/running back Donny Anderson's twisting, left-footed kick, and Packers tight end Dick Capp recovered the ball. After two incomplete passes, Starr threw a 9-yard completion to Dowler (despite a heavy rush from defensive end Ike Lassiter) to set up Chandler's third field goal from the 43 as time expired in the first half, giving the Packers a 16–7 lead.

At halftime, Packers guard Jerry Kramer said to his teammates (referring to Lombardi), "Let's play the last 30 minutes for the old man."

=== Third quarter ===
Any chance the Raiders might have had to make a comeback seemed to completely vanish in the second half. The Packers had the ball three times in the third quarter, and held it for all but two and a half minutes. On the Packers' second drive of the half starting at their own 17, Wilson ripped up the middle for 14 yards on a draw play. Anderson picked up 8 yards on a sweep, and Wilson carried to within inches of the first down. Starr then pulled one of his favorite plays on third down and short yardage, faking to Wilson and completing a 35-yard pass to wide receiver Max McGee who had slipped past three Raiders at the line of scrimmage. This was McGee's only reception of the game, and the final one of his career. Starr then hit Dale on a sideline route at the Oakland 13. Starr overthrew Anderson wide open in the end zone, but on the next play he rolled out to the right and threw back to Anderson who was tackled at the 2-yard line by linebacker Gus Otto. The next play was a broken play, as Anderson thought he saw daylight to the right but ran into Starr. The Packers were not rattled, and Anderson's 2-yard touchdown run increased Green Bay's lead to 23–7.

Packers guard Jerry Kramer must have taken to heart his plea to play the second half for Coach Lombardi. On this drive, game films show him blowing Conners out of Wilson's path on the draw play, then flattening Conners again on Anderson's scoring run.

Again the Green Bay defense forced Oakland to go three-and-out, and the Raiders punted. The Packers drove from their own 39-yard line to the Raiders' 24 and increased their lead to 26–7 as Chandler kicked his fourth field goal of the game (which hit the crossbar from 31 yards out and bounced over).

=== Fourth quarter ===
On the Raiders' first play of the fourth quarter, Lamonica completed a pass to running back Pete Banaszak, but safety Tom Brown forced a fumble on Banaszak, which was recovered and returned to the Raiders' 37-yard line by linebacker Dave Robinson. On the next play, however, Starr was knocked out of the game when he jammed the thumb on his throwing hand after getting sacked for an 11-yard loss by Davidson. Starr was replaced by Zeke Bratkowski, who was then sacked on his only pass attempt. The Packers could not get back to the original line of scrimmage after the sack, forcing them to punt it back to the Raiders. However, the Packers cemented the game when cornerback Herb Adderley intercepted a pass intended for wide receiver Fred Biletnikoff and returned it 60 yards for a touchdown, making the score 33–7 in favor of Green Bay. Adderley laid back as Biletnikoff ran a curl route, then dashed in front of him to snare the ball and scored with the help of a crushing downfield block by defensive tackle Ron Kostelnik.

Oakland did manage to score on their next drive after the turnover with a second 23-yard touchdown pass from Lamonica to Miller, set up by Banaszak's 41-yard reception on the previous play. But all the Raiders' second touchdown did was make the final score look remotely more respectable, 33–14.

At the end of the game, coach Lombardi was carried off the field by his victorious Packers. It was in fact Lombardi's last game as Packer coach and his ninth consecutive playoff victory.

Oakland's Bill Miller was the top receiver of the game with 5 receptions for 84 yards and 2 touchdowns. Green Bay fullback Ben Wilson was the leading rusher of the game with 62 yards despite missing most of the fourth quarter while looking for a lost contact lens on the sidelines. Don Chandler ended his Packer career in style with 4 field goals. Lamonica, the game's leading passer, finished with 15 out of 34 pass completions for 208 yards, 2 touchdowns, and 1 interception. Bart Starr completed 13 of 24 (with a couple of dropped passes) for 202 yards and one touchdown; his passer rating for the game was 96.2 to Lamonica's 71.7. The Packers outgained the Raiders in rushing yardage 160 to 107, led in time of possession by 35:54 to 24:06, had no turnovers, and only one penalty. Packer guard Jerry Kramer later recalled the mental mistakes his team made in the game, which only highlights the impossibly high standards held by Lombardi's team. As previously mentioned, this was Lombardi's last game as Green Bay head coach and this was also the final game for Green Bay Packer players Max McGee, Fuzzy Thurston, and Don Chandler.

=== Box score ===
Super Bowl II: Green Bay Packers 33, Oakland Raiders 14

| Quarter | 1 | 2 | 3 | 4 | Total |
|---|---|---|---|---|---|
| Packers (NFL) | 3 | 13 | 10 | 7 | 33 |
| Raiders (AFL) | 0 | 7 | 0 | 7 | 14 |

at Miami Orange Bowl, Miami, Florida

- Date: January 14, 1968
- Game time: 3:05 p.m. EST
- Game weather: 68 °F (20 °C), partly cloudy

Scoring summary

| Quarter | Time | Drive | | | Team | Scoring information | Score | |
| Quarter | Time | Plays | Yards | TOP | Team | Scoring information | GB | OAK |
|---|---|---|---|---|---|---|---|---|
| 1 | 9:53 | 9 | 34 | 3:51 | GB | 39-yard field goal by Don Chandler | 3 | 0 |
| 2 | 11:52 | 16 | 84 | 8:40 | GB | 20-yard field goal by Chandler | 6 | 0 |
| 2 | 10:50 | 1 | 62 | :11 | GB | Boyd Dowler 62-yard touchdown reception from Bart Starr, Chandler kick good | 13 | 0 |
| 2 | 6:15 | 9 | 78 | 4:35 | OAK | Bill Miller 23-yard touchdown reception from Daryle Lamonica, George Blanda kick good | 13 | 7 |
| 2 | 0:01 | 3 | 9 | :22 | GB | 43-yard field goal by Chandler | 16 | 7 |
| 3 | 5:54 | 11 | 82 | 4:41 | GB | Donny Anderson 2-yard touchdown run, Chandler kick good | 23 | 7 |
| 3 | 0:02 | 8 | 37 | 4:47 | GB | 31-yard field goal by Chandler | 26 | 7 |
| 4 | 11:03 | — | — | — | GB | Interception returned 60 yards for touchdown by Herb Adderley, Chandler kick good | 33 | 7 |
| 4 | 9:13 | 4 | 74 | 1:50 | OAK | Miller 23-yard touchdown reception from Lamonica, Blanda kick good | 33 | 14 |
| "TOP" = time of possession. For other American football terms, see Glossary of American football. | | | | | | | 33 | 14 |

== Final statistics ==
Sources:The NFL's Official Encyclopedic History of Professional Football, (1973), p. 139, Macmillan Publishing Co. New York, NY, LCCN 73-3862, NFL.com Super Bowl II, Super Bowl II Play Finder GB, Super Bowl II Play Finder Oak

=== Statistical comparison ===
| | Green Bay Packers | Oakland Raiders |
|---|---|---|
| First downs | 19 | 16 |
| First downs rushing | 11 | 5 |
| First downs passing | 7 | 10 |
| First downs penalty | 1 | 1 |
| Third down efficiency | 5/16 | 3/11 |
| Fourth down efficiency | 1/1 | 0/0 |
| Net yards rushing | 160 | 107 |
| Rushing attempts | 41 | 20 |
| Yards per rush | 3.9 | 5.4 |
| Passing – Completions/attempts | 13/24 | 15/34 |
| Times sacked-total yards | 4–40 | 3–22 |
| Interceptions thrown | 0 | 1 |
| Net yards passing | 162 | 186 |
| Total net yards | 322 | 293 |
| Punt returns-total yards | 5–35 | 3–12 |
| Kickoff returns-total yards | 3–49 | 7–127 |
| Interceptions-total return yards | 1–60 | 0–0 |
| Punts-average yardage | 6–39.0 | 6–44.0 |
| Fumbles-lost | 0–0 | 3–2 |
| Penalties-total yards | 1–12 | 4–31 |
| Time of possession | 35:54 | 24:06 |
| Turnovers | 0 | 3 |

=== Individual statistics ===
Packers passing
| | C/ATT^{1} | Yds | TD | INT | Rating |
|---|---|---|---|---|---|
| Bart Starr | 13/24 | 202 | 1 | 0 | 96.2 |
Packers rushing
| | Car^{2} | Yds | TD | LG^{3} | Yds/Car |
| Ben Wilson | 17 | 62 | 0 | 13 | 3.65 |
| Donny Anderson | 14 | 48 | 1 | 8 | 3.43 |
| Travis Williams | 8 | 36 | 0 | 18 | 4.50 |
| Bart Starr | 1 | 14 | 0 | 14 | 14.00 |
| Chuck Mercein | 1 | 0 | 0 | 0 | 0.00 |
Packers receiving
| | Rec^{4} | Yds | TD | LG^{3} | Target^{5} |
| Carroll Dale | 4 | 43 | 0 | 17 | 6 |
| Marv Fleming | 4 | 35 | 0 | 11 | 7 |
| Boyd Dowler | 2 | 71 | 1 | 62 | 4 |
| Donny Anderson | 2 | 18 | 0 | 12 | 4 |
| Max McGee | 1 | 35 | 0 | 35 | 2 |
| Travis Williams | 0 | 0 | 0 | 0 | 1 |

Raiders passing
| | C/ATT^{1} | Yds | TD | INT | Rating |
|---|---|---|---|---|---|
| Daryle Lamonica | 15/34 | 208 | 2 | 1 | 71.7 |
Raiders rushing
| | Car^{2} | Yds | TD | LG^{3} | Yds/Car |
| Hewritt Dixon | 12 | 54 | 0 | 15 | 4.50 |
| Larry Todd | 2 | 37 | 0 | 32 | 18.50 |
| Pete Banaszak | 6 | 16 | 0 | 5 | 2.67 |
Raiders receiving
| | Rec^{4} | Yds | TD | LG^{3} | Target^{5} |
| Bill Miller | 5 | 84 | 2 | 23 | 6 |
| Pete Banaszak | 4 | 69 | 0 | 41 | 7 |
| Billy Cannon | 2 | 25 | 0 | 15 | 5 |
| Fred Biletnikoff | 2 | 10 | 0 | 6 | 5 |
| Warren Wells | 1 | 17 | 0 | 17 | 2 |
| Hewritt Dixon | 1 | 3 | 0 | 3 | 7 |
| Larry Todd | 0 | 0 | 0 | 0 | 1 |

^{1}Completions/attempts ^{2}Carries ^{3}Long gain ^{4}Receptions ^{5}Times targeted

=== Records set ===
The following records were set or tied in Super Bowl II, according to the official NFL.com boxscore and the ProFootball reference.com game summary. Some records have to meet NFL minimum number of attempts to be recognized. The minimums are shown (in parentheses).

Player records set
| Most points scored, game | 15 (4 FG, 3 PAT) | Don Chandler (Green Bay) |
| Most points scored, career | 20 (4 FG, 8 PAT) | Don Chandler (Green Bay) |
| Longest scoring play | 62 yard reception | Boyd Dowler (Green Bay) |
Passing records
| Most attempts, game | 34 | Daryle Lamonica (Oakland) |
| Most attempts, career | 47 | Bart Starr (Green Bay) |
| Most completions, career | 29 | Bart Starr (Green Bay) |
| Highest completion percentage, career, (40 attempts) | 61.7% (29–47) | Bart Starr (Green Bay) |
| Highest passer rating, career, (40 attempts) | 103.8 | Bart Starr (Green Bay) |
| Most passing yards, career | 452 | Bart Starr (Green Bay) |
| Longest pass | 62 yards (TD) | Bart Starr (Green Bay) |
| Highest average gain, career (40 attempts) | 9.6 yards (452–47) | Bart Starr (Green Bay) |
| Fewest interceptions | 0 | Bart Starr (Green Bay) |
| Most attempts, without interception, game | 24 | Bart Starr (Green Bay) |
| Lowest percentage, passes had intercepted, career, (40 attempts) | 2.1% (1–47) | Bart Starr (Green Bay) |
| Most touchdown passes, career | 3 | Bart Starr (Green Bay) |
Rushing records
| Most yards, game | 62 | Ben Wilson (Green Bay) |
| Most yards, career | 62 | Ben Wilson (Green Bay) |
| Longest run from scrimmage | 32 yards | Larry Todd (Oakland) |
| Highest average gain, game (10 attempts) | 4.5 yards (54–12) | Hewritt Dixon (Oakland) |
Receiving records
| Longest reception | 62 yards | Boyd Dowler |
| Longest touchdown reception | 62 yards | Boyd Dowler |
| Most receptions, career | 8 | Max McGee (Green Bay) |
| Most yards, career | 173 | Max McGee (Green Bay) |
| Highest average gain, career (8 receptions) | 21.6 yards (8–173) | Max McGee (Green Bay) |
Combined yardage records
| Most yards gained, career | 173 | Max McGee |
Fumbles
| Most fumbles recovered, game | 1 | Dick Capp (Green Bay); Dave Robinson (Green Bay); J. R. Williamson (Oakland) |
| Most fumbles recovered, career | 1 | Dick Capp (Green Bay); Dave Robinson (Green Bay); J. R. Williamson (Oakland) |
Defense
| Most interception yards gained, game | 60 | Herb Adderley (Green Bay) |
| Most interception yards gained, career | 60 | Herb Adderley (Green Bay) |
| Longest interception return | 60 yards | Herb Adderley (Green Bay) |
| Most interceptions returned for touchdown, game | 1 | Herb Adderley (Green Bay) |
| Most sacks, game ^{‡} | 3 | Willie Davis (Green Bay) |
| Most sacks, career ^{‡} | 4.5 | Willie Davis (Green Bay) |
Special Teams
| Highest punting average, game (4 punts) | 44.0 yards (6–264) | Mike Eischeid (Oakland) |
| Most punt returns, game | 5 | Willie Wood (Green Bay) |
| Most punt returns, career | 6 | Willie Wood (Green Bay) |
| Most punt return yards gained, game | 35 | Willie Wood (Green Bay) |
| Most punt return yards gained, career | 33 | Willie Wood (Green Bay) |
| Longest punt return | 31 yards | Willie Wood (Green Bay) |
| Highest average, punt return yardage, career (4 returns) | 5.5 yds (33–6) | Willie Wood (Green Bay) |
| Most field goals attempted, game | 4 | Don Chandler |
| Most field goals attempted, career | 4 | Don Chandler |
| Most field goals made, game | 4 | Don Chandler |
| Most field goals made, career | 4 | Don Chandler |
| Most 40-plus yard field goals, game | 1 | Don Chandler |
| Longest field goal | 43 yards | Don Chandler |
| Most (one point) extra points, career | 8 | Don Chandler |
Player Records Tied
| Most interceptions, game | 1 | Herb Adderley |
| Most interceptions, career | 1 | Herb Adderley |
| Most fumbles, game | 1 | Pete Banaszak; Warren Wells; Rodger Bird (Oakland) |
| Most fumbles, career | 1 | Pete Banaszak; Warren Wells; Rodger Bird (Oakland) |
| Most punts, career | 7 | Donny Anderson (Green Bay) |
| Most touchdown passes, game | 2 | Daryle Lamonica |
| Most interceptions thrown, game | 1 | Daryle Lamonica |
| Most interceptions thrown, career | 1 | Daryle Lamonica |
| Most rushing attempts, game | 17 | Ben Wilson |
| Most rushing attempts, career | 17 | Ben Wilson |
| Most receiving touchdowns, game | 2 | Bill Miller (Oakland) |
| Most receiving touchdowns, career | 2 | Bill Miller (Oakland) |
| Most touchdowns, career | 2 | Bill Miller (Oakland) |

- † This category includes rushing, receiving, interception returns, punt returns, kickoff returns, and fumble returns.
- ‡ Sacks an official statistic since Super Bowl XVII by the NFL. Sacks are listed as "Tackled Attempting to Pass" in the official NFL box score for Super Bowl II.

Team records set
| Most Super Bowl appearances | 2 | Packers |
| Most Super Bowl victories | 2 | Packers |
| Most consecutive Super Bowl appearances | 2 | Packers |
| Most consecutive Super Bowl victories | 2 | Packers |
Points
| Smallest margin of victory | 19 points | Packers |
| Most points scored, first half | 16 | Packers |
| Most points, second quarter | 13 | Packers |
| Largest halftime margin | 9 points | Packers |
| Largest lead, end of 3rd quarter | 19 points | Packers |
| Fewest points, first half | 7 | Raiders |
Touchdowns, Field Goals
| Most touchdowns, losing team | 2 | Raiders |
| Longest touchdown scoring drive | 82 yards | Packers |
| Most field goals attempted | 4 | Packers |
| Most field goals made | 4 | Packers |
Rushing
| Most rushing attempts | 41 | Packers |
| Most rushing yards (net) | 160 yards | Packers |
| Highest average gain per rush attempt | 5.35 yards | Raiders (107–20) |
Passing
| Most passing attempts | 34 | Raiders |
| Fewest passes completed | 13 | Packers |
| Lowest completion percentage (20 attempts) | 44.1% | Raiders (15–34) |
| Fewest yards passing (net) | 162 | Packers |
| Fewest times intercepted | 0 | Packers |
First Downs
| Fewest first downs | 16 | Raiders |
| Most first downs rushing | 11 | Packers |
| Fewest first downs passing | 7 | Packers |
Defense
| Most yards gained by interception return | 60 | Packers |
| Most touchdowns scored by interception return | 1 | Packers |
| Most yards allowed in a win | 293 | Packers |
Fumbles
| Most fumbles, game | 3 | Raiders |
| Most fumbles lost, game | 2 | Raiders |
| Most fumbles recovered, game | 2 | Packers |
Turnovers
| Most turnovers, game | 3 | Raiders |
| Fewest turnovers, game | 0 | Packers |
Kickoff returns
| Most kickoff returns, game | 7 | Raiders |
| Fewest yards gained, game | 49 | Packers |
Punting
| Lowest average, game (4 punts) | 39.0 yards | Packers (234–6) |
Punt returns
| Most punt returns, game | 5 | Packers |
| Most yards gained, game | 35 | Packers |
| Fewest yards gained, game | 12 | Raiders |
| Highest average return yardage, game (3 returns) | 7.0 yards | Packers (35–5) |
Penalties
| Fewest penalties, game | 1 | Packers |
| Fewest yards penalized, game | 12 | Packers |
Team records tied
| Most points, fourth quarter | 7 | Packers; Raiders |
| Most first downs, penalty | 1 | Packers; Raiders |
| Most Super Bowl losses | 1 | Raiders |
| Fewest rushing touchdowns | 0 | Raiders |
| Most times intercepted | 1 | Raiders |
| Most passing touchdowns | 2 | Raiders |
| Fewest punt returns, game | 3 | Raiders |
| Most penalties, game | 4 | Raiders |
| Fewest times sacked | 3 | Raiders |
| Fewest passing touchdowns | 1 | Packers |
| Most interceptions by | 1 | Packers |
| Fewest kickoff returns, game | 3 | Packers |

Turnovers are defined as the number of times losing the ball on interceptions and fumbles.

Records set, both team totals
| | Total | Green Bay | Oakland |
Points, Both Teams
| Most points | 47 | 33 | 14 |
| Fewest points scored, first half | 23 | 16 | 7 |
| Most points scored, second half | 24 | 17 | 7 |
| Most points, second quarter | 20 | 13 | 7 |
| Most points, fourth quarter | 14 | 7 | 7 |
Field goals, extra points, both teams
| Most field goals attempted | 5 | 4 | 1 |
| Most field goals made | 4 | 4 | 0 |
| Fewest (one point) PATs | 5 | (3-3) | (2-2) |
Net yards, Both Teams
| Most net yards, rushing and passing | 615 | 322 | 293 |
Rushing, Both Teams
| Most rushing attempts | 61 | 41 | 20 |
| Most rushing yards (net) | 267 | 160 | 107 |
Passing, Both Teams
| Most passing attempts | 58 | 24 | 34 |
| Fewest yards passing (net) | 348 | 162 | 186 |
| Fewest times intercepted | 1 | 0 | 1 |
First Downs, Both Teams
| Fewest first downs | 35 | 19 | 16 |
| Most first downs rushing | 16 | 11 | 5 |
| Fewest first downs, passing | 17 | 7 | 10 |
| Most first downs, penalty | 2 | 1 | 1 |
Defense, Both Teams
| Fewest sacks by | 7 | 4 | 3 |
| Fewest interceptions by | 1 | 1 | 0 |
| Most yards gained by interception return | 60 | 60 | 0 |
Fumbles, Both Teams
| Most fumbles | 3 | 0 | 3 |
| Most fumbles lost | 2 | 0 | 2 |
Turnovers, Both Teams
| Most Turnovers | 3 | 0 | 3 |
Kickoff returns, Both Teams
| Most kickoff returns | 10 | 3 | 7 |
| Fewest yards gained | 176 | 49 | 127 |
Punting, Both Teams
| Most punts, game | 12 | 6 | 6 |
Punt returns, Both Teams
| Most punt returns, game | 8 | 5 | 3 |
| Most yards gained, game | 47 | 35 | 12 |
Penalties, Both Teams
| Fewest penalties, game | 5 | 1 | 4 |
| Fewest yards penalized | 43 | 12 | 31 |
Records tied, both team totals
| Most passing touchdowns | 3 | 1 | 2 |

== Starting lineups ==
Hall of Fame‡

| Green Bay | Position | Oakland |
|---|---|---|
Offense
| Boyd Dowler | SE | Bill Miller |
| Bob Skoronski | LT | Bob Svihus |
| Gale Gillingham | LG | Gene Upshaw‡ |
| Ken Bowman | C | Jim Otto‡ |
| Jerry Kramer‡ | RG | Wayne Hawkins |
| Forrest Gregg‡ | RT | Harry Schuh |
| Marv Fleming | TE | Billy Cannon |
| Carroll Dale | FL | Fred Biletnikoff‡ |
| Bart Starr‡ | QB | Daryle Lamonica |
| Donny Anderson | HB | Pete Banaszak |
| Ben Wilson | FB | Hewritt Dixon |
Defense
| Willie Davis‡ | LE | Ike Lassiter |
| Ron Kostelnik | LT | Dan Birdwell |
| Henry Jordan‡ | RT | Tom Keating |
| Lionel Aldridge | RE | Ben Davidson |
| Dave Robinson‡ | LLB | Bill Laskey |
| Ray Nitschke‡ | MLB | Dan Conners |
| Lee Roy Caffey | RLB | Gus Otto |
| Herb Adderley‡ | LCB | Kent McCloughan |
| Bob Jeter | RCB | Willie Brown‡ |
| Tom Brown | LS | Warren Powers |
| Willie Wood‡ | RS | Howie Williams |

== Officials ==
- Referee: Jack Vest (AFL)
- Umpire: Ralph Morcroft (NFL)
- Head linesman: Tony Veteri (AFL)
- Line judge: Bruce Alford (NFL)
- Back judge: Stan Javie (NFL)
- Field judge: Bob Baur (AFL)

Alternates

- Referee Ben Dreith (AFL)

Note: A seven-official system was not used until 1978

== See also ==
- 1967 NFL season
- 1967 NFL playoffs
- 1967 NFL Championship Game
- American Football League playoffs

== Bibliography ==
- Gruver, Edward (2002). Nitschke. Lanham, MD.:Taylor Trade Publishing. ISBN 1-58979-127-4
