= List of national anthem performers at the Super Bowl =

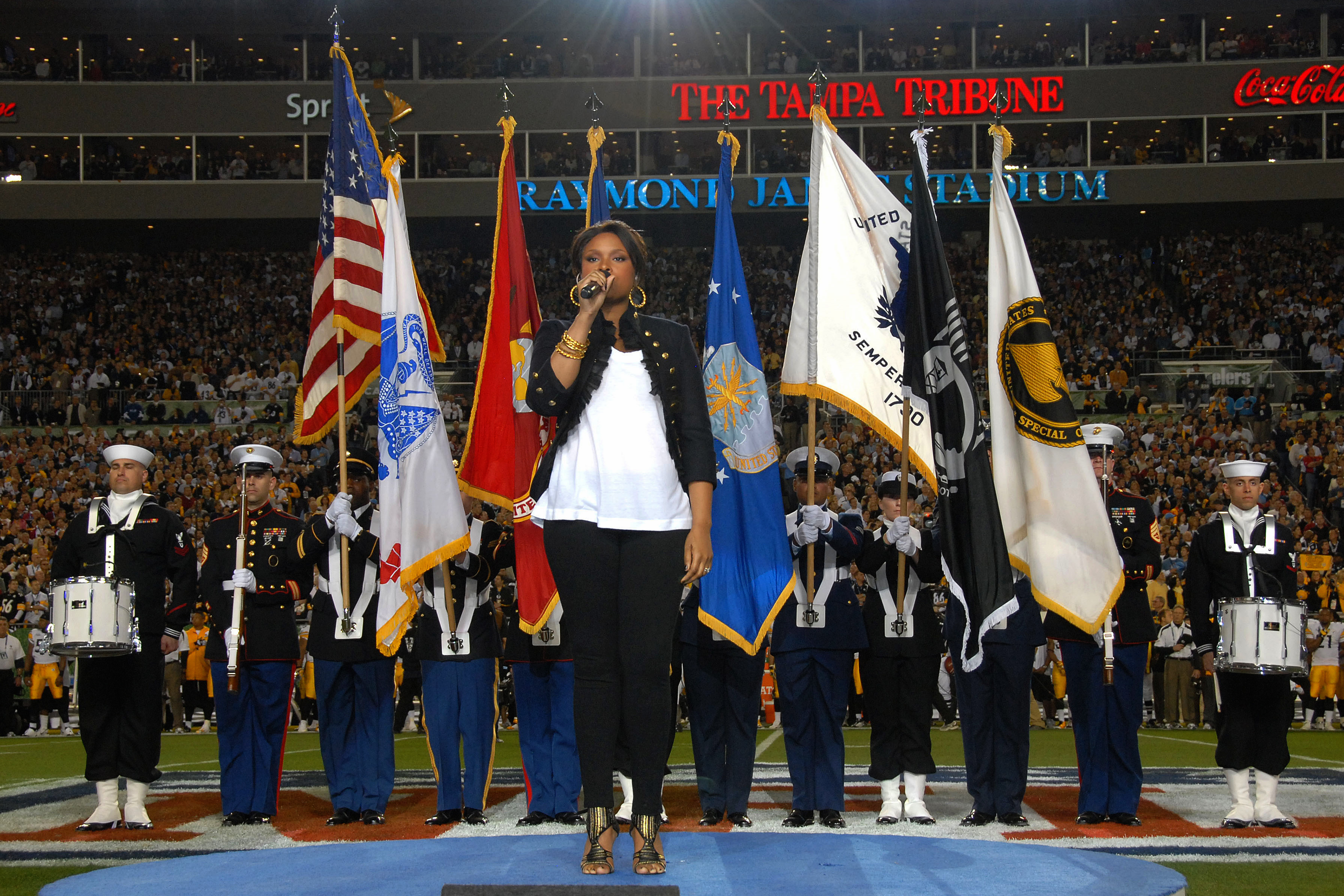
Jennifer Hudson sings the national anthem at Super Bowl XLIII.

"The Star-Spangled Banner" is the national anthem of the United States. It has been performed at all but one Super Bowl since its first year in 1967; Vikki Carr sang "America the Beautiful" in place of the anthem at Super Bowl XI in 1977. Since Super Bowl XVI in 1982 (except 1985 and 2005), famous singers or music groups have performed the anthem at the vast majority of Super Bowl games and was accompanied by an American Sign Language (ASL) performer since Super Bowl XXVI in 1992.

Beginning with Super Bowl XLIII in 2009, "America the Beautiful" is sung before the national anthem every year and is followed by the presentation of the colors and a military flyover preceded the anthem. Beginning in 2021, "Lift Every Voice and Sing" was sung prior to "America the Beautiful" and the national anthem in honor of Black History Month. Some early Super Bowls featured marching bands performing the anthem and the recitation of the Pledge of Allegiance. Celine Dion sang "God Bless America" in place of "America the Beautiful" at Super Bowl XXXVII.

== Performances ==
=== 1967–1991 ===
No.	Year	Venue	Location	Performer(s)	Anthem Flyovers
I	1967	L.A. Coliseum	Los Angeles	The Pride of Arizona, Michigan Marching Band, and UCLA choir	
II	1968	Orange Bowl	Miami	GSU Tiger Marching Band	
III	1969	Orange Bowl	Miami	Lloyd Geisler of the Washington National Symphony Orchestra (trumpet) (Note: An NFL.com reference states that Anita Bryant performed the anthem, but NBC's broadcast of game, available from the Paley Center for Media's collection, shows that Geisler performed it.)	
IV	1970	Tulane Stadium	New Orleans	Doc Severinsen, Pat O'Brien (actor who played Knute Rockne, performed in spoken word), Southern University Band	
V	1971	Orange Bowl	Miami	Tommy Loy (trumpet)	
VI	1972	Tulane Stadium	New Orleans	U.S. Air Force Academy Chorale	USAF F-4 Phantoms First known flyover
VII	1973	L.A. Coliseum	Los Angeles	Little Angels (children's choir) of Chicago's Holy Angels Church	
VIII	1974	Rice Stadium	Houston	Charley Pride	
IX	1975	Tulane Stadium	New Orleans	New Orleans Chapter of the Society for the Preservation of Barbershop Quartet Singing in America--Chorus (2)	
X	1976	Orange Bowl	Miami	Tom Sullivan	
XI	1977	Rose Bowl	Pasadena	None (Vikki Carr sang "America the Beautiful")	
XII	1978	Superdome	New Orleans	Phyllis Kelly of Northeast Louisiana University (now the University of Louisiana at Monroe)	
XIII	1979	Orange Bowl	Miami	The Colgate Thirteen	
XIV	1980	Rose Bowl	Pasadena	Cheryl Ladd	
XV	1981	Superdome	New Orleans	Helen O'Connell	
XVI	1982	Silverdome	Pontiac	Diana Ross	
XVII	1983	Rose Bowl	Pasadena	Leslie Easterbrook	
XVIII	1984	Tampa Stadium	Tampa	Barry Manilow	
XIX	1985	Stanford Stadium	Stanford	San Francisco Boys Chorus, San Francisco Girls Chorus, Piedmont Children's Chorus, and San Francisco Children's Chorus	USAF T-37 Tweet Trainers Beginning of regular flyovers
XX	1986	Superdome	New Orleans	Wynton Marsalis (trumpet)	No Flyover
XXI	1987	Rose Bowl	Pasadena	Neil Diamond	*no documentation
XXII	1988	Jack Murphy Stadium	San Diego	Herb Alpert (trumpet)	Navy Blue Angels
XXIII	1989	Joe Robbie Stadium	Miami	Billy Joel	USAF F-16 Fighting Falcons
XXIV	1990	Superdome	New Orleans	Aaron Neville	No Flyover
XXV	1991	Tampa Stadium	Tampa	Whitney Houston with Florida Orchestra directed by Jahja Ling	USAF F-16 Fighting Falcons

=== 1992–present ===
No.	Year	Venue	Location	Performer(s)	American Sign Language	Anthem Flyover
XXVI	1992	Metrodome	Minneapolis	Harry Connick Jr.	Lori Hilary	No Flyover
XXVII	1993	Rose Bowl	Pasadena	Garth Brooks	Marlee Matlin	*no documentation
XXVIII	1994	Georgia Dome	Atlanta	Natalie Cole	Courtney Keel Foley	No Flyover
XXIX	1995	Joe Robbie Stadium	Miami	Kathie Lee Gifford	Heather Whitestone	*no documentation
XXX	1996	Sun Devil Stadium	Tempe	Vanessa Williams	Mary Kim Titla	USAF F-16 Fighting Falcons
XXXI	1997	Superdome	New Orleans	Luther Vandross	Erika Rachael Schwarz	USAF F-16 Fighting Falcons
XXXII	1998	Qualcomm Stadium	San Diego	Jewel	Phyllis Frelich	USAF C-130 Hercules
XXXIII	1999	Pro Player Stadium	Miami	Cher	Speaking Hands	*no documentation
XXXIV	2000	Georgia Dome	Atlanta	Faith Hill	Briarlake Elementary School Signing Choir	No Flyover
XXXV	2001	Raymond James Stadium	Tampa	Backstreet Boys	Tom Cooney	USAF B-2 Spirit
XXXVI	2002	Superdome	New Orleans	Mariah Carey with Boston Pops directed by Keith Lockhart	Joe Narcisse	USAF F-15 Eagles, F-16 Fighting Falcons
XXXVII	2003	Qualcomm Stadium	San Diego	Dixie Chicks	Janet Maxwell	Navy F/A-18 Hornets
XXXVIII	2004	Reliant Stadium	Houston	Beyoncé	Suzanna Christy	US Army AH-64D Apache
XXXIX	2005	Alltel Stadium	Jacksonville	Combined choirs of the U.S. Service Academies (Note: The National Anthem was performed by the combined choirs of the United States Military Academy, the United States Naval Academy, the United States Air Force Academy, and the United States Coast Guard Academy (including members of The Idlers) accompanied by the United States Army Herald Trumpets.)	Wesley Tallent	USAF / Navy F/A-18 Super Hornets, F-22 Raptor
XL	2006	Ford Field	Detroit	Aaron Neville (2), Aretha Franklin, Dr. John	Angela LaGuardia	No Flyover
XLI	2007	Dolphin Stadium	Miami Gardens	Billy Joel (2)	Marlee Matlin (2)	USAF Thunderbirds
XLII	2008	University of Phoenix Stadium	Glendale	Jordin Sparks	A Dreamer	Navy Blue Angels
XLIII	2009	Raymond James Stadium	Tampa	Jennifer Hudson	Kristen Santos	USAF Thunderbirds
XLIV	2010	Sun Life Stadium	Miami Gardens	Carrie Underwood	Kinesha Battles	USAF F-15C Eagles
XLV	2011	Cowboys Stadium	Arlington	Christina Aguilera	Candice Villesca	Navy F/A-18 Hornets
XLVI	2012	Lucas Oil Stadium	Indianapolis	Kelly Clarkson with Indianapolis Children's Choir	Rachel Mazique	No Flyover
XLVII	2013	Superdome	New Orleans	Alicia Keys	John Maucere	No Flyover
XLVIII	2014	MetLife Stadium	East Rutherford	Renée Fleming with Armed Forces Chorus	Amber Zion	US Army Helicopters UH-60M Black Hawk, AH-64-D Apache, CH-47F Chinook
XLIX	2015	University of Phoenix Stadium	Glendale	Idina Menzel	Treshelle Edmond	USAF Thunderbirds
50	2016	Levi's Stadium	Santa Clara	Lady Gaga	Marlee Matlin (3)	Navy Blue Angels
LI	2017	NRG Stadium	Houston	Luke Bryan	Kriston Lee Pumphrey	USAF Thunderbirds
LII	2018	U.S. Bank Stadium	Minneapolis	Pink	Alexandria Wailes	USAF / Heritage Flight F-16 Fighting Falcons, A-10 Thunderbolt II, P-51 Mustang
LIII	2019	Mercedes-Benz Stadium	Atlanta	Gladys Knight	Aarron Loggins	USAF Thunderbirds
LIV	2020	Hard Rock Stadium	Miami Gardens	Demi Lovato	Christine Sun Kim	USMC / Navy F/A-18E/F Super Hornets, F-35C Lightning II
LV	2021	Raymond James Stadium	Tampa	Eric Church and Jazmine Sullivan	Warren Snipe	USAF All Bomber Flight B-1 Lancer, B-2 Spirit, B-52 Stratofortress
LVI	2022	SoFi Stadium	Inglewood	Mickey Guyton	Sandra Mae Frank	USAF / Heritage Flight A-10 Thunderbolt II, F-16 Fighting Falcon, F-22 Raptor, F-35 Lightning II, P-51 Mustang
LVII	2023	State Farm Stadium	Glendale	Chris Stapleton	Troy Kotsur	All Female Navy Flight F/A-18F Super Hornets, F-35C Lightning II, EA-18G Growler
LVIII	2024	Allegiant Stadium	Paradise	Reba McEntire	Daniel Durant	USAF Thunderbirds
LIX	2025	Caesars Superdome	New Orleans	Jon Batiste	Stephanie Nogueras	USMC F-35B Lightning II, MV-22 Ospreys
LX	2026	Levi's Stadium	Santa Clara	Charlie Puth with Kenny G, Oakland Interfaith Gospel Choir, Sainted Trap Choir, and Color of Noize Orchestra directed by Steve Hackman	Fred Beam	Combined USAF / Navy B-1B Lancer, F-15C Eagles, F/A-18E Super Hornets
LXI	2027	SoFi Stadium	Inglewood	TBD	TBA	TBD

== Notable performances ==
The performance by Whitney Houston at Super Bowl XXV in 1991, during the Gulf War, has been for many years regarded as one of the best renditions ever. It was released as a single a few weeks later, appeared on the album Whitney: The Greatest Hits, and was re-released as a single in 2001 shortly after the September 11 attacks.

The 1992 performance marked the first time American Sign Language was used alongside the lead singer.

Faith Hill performed the anthem at Super Bowl XXXIV in 2000. Following the September 11 attacks, her version entered the Hot Country Songs chart at number 35.

== Controversies ==
Since 1993, the NFL has required performers to supply a backup track during the national anthem, America the Beautiful, and Lift Every Voice and Sing to ensure audio quality and prevent performance glitches due to factors like weather, loud crowds, or technical issues. This came after Garth Brooks walked out of the stadium prior to his XXVII performance. Only 45 minutes before kickoff, he refused to take the stage, due to a dispute with NBC. Brooks requested that the network premiere the music video for his new single "We Shall Be Free" during the pregame. The network chose not to air the video, due to content some felt was disturbing imagery. Brooks had also refused to pre-record the anthem, which meant the league had nothing to play if he left. Television producers spotted Jon Bon Jovi in the grandstands, and were prepared to use him as a replacement. After last-minute negotiations, NBC agreed to air a clip of the video during the broadcast of the game, and Brooks was coaxed back into the stadium and sang.

Following the "wardrobe malfunction" controversy during Super Bowl XXXVIII in 2004, all scheduled performers for Super Bowl XXXIX were chosen under heavy scrutiny. Game organizers decided not to use a popular music vocalist. The combined choirs of the U.S. Military Academy, the Naval Academy, Air Force Academy, Coast Guard Academy, and the U.S. Army Herald Trumpets were invited to perform. This was the first time since the second inauguration of President Richard Nixon in 1973 that all four service academies sang together.

Two days after Super Bowl XLIII, it was revealed that Jennifer Hudson also had lip synced.

At the beginning of Super Bowl XLV, Christina Aguilera sang the lyrics incorrectly. Instead of singing "O'er the ramparts we watched, were so gallantly streaming", the pop star sang "What so proudly we watched at the twilight's last gleaming". According to the New York Times, she also changed "gleaming" to "reaming".

== Military flyovers ==
In recent years, the national anthem has been followed by a flyover of the stadium by a group of military aircraft. The first time this happened was Super Bowl VI with a group of F-4 Phantoms from the 33rd Tactical Fighter Wing at Elgin Air Force Base for fallen military members during the Vietnam War. The practice wouldn't become a regular tradition until Super Bowl XIX and of course would be missed over several of the next games because they were held indoors. Both the USAF Thunderbirds (six) and the Navy Blue Angels (three) have been regular performers of the flyovers.

The Super Bowl XLV flyover by Navy F/A-18 Hornets from Naval Air Station Oceana was criticized as too expensive due to the existence of a naval air station in Fort Worth, Texas. And the flyovers have been criticized in general as promoting militarism and war.

The flyovers have also been praised for promoting history during Super Bowl LII where a World War II era P-51 Mustang flew with modern USAF jets. And at Super Bowl LVII, the Navy flyover consisted of all female pilots, honoring the 50th anniversary of the first female navy pilot.

== Other patriotic performances ==
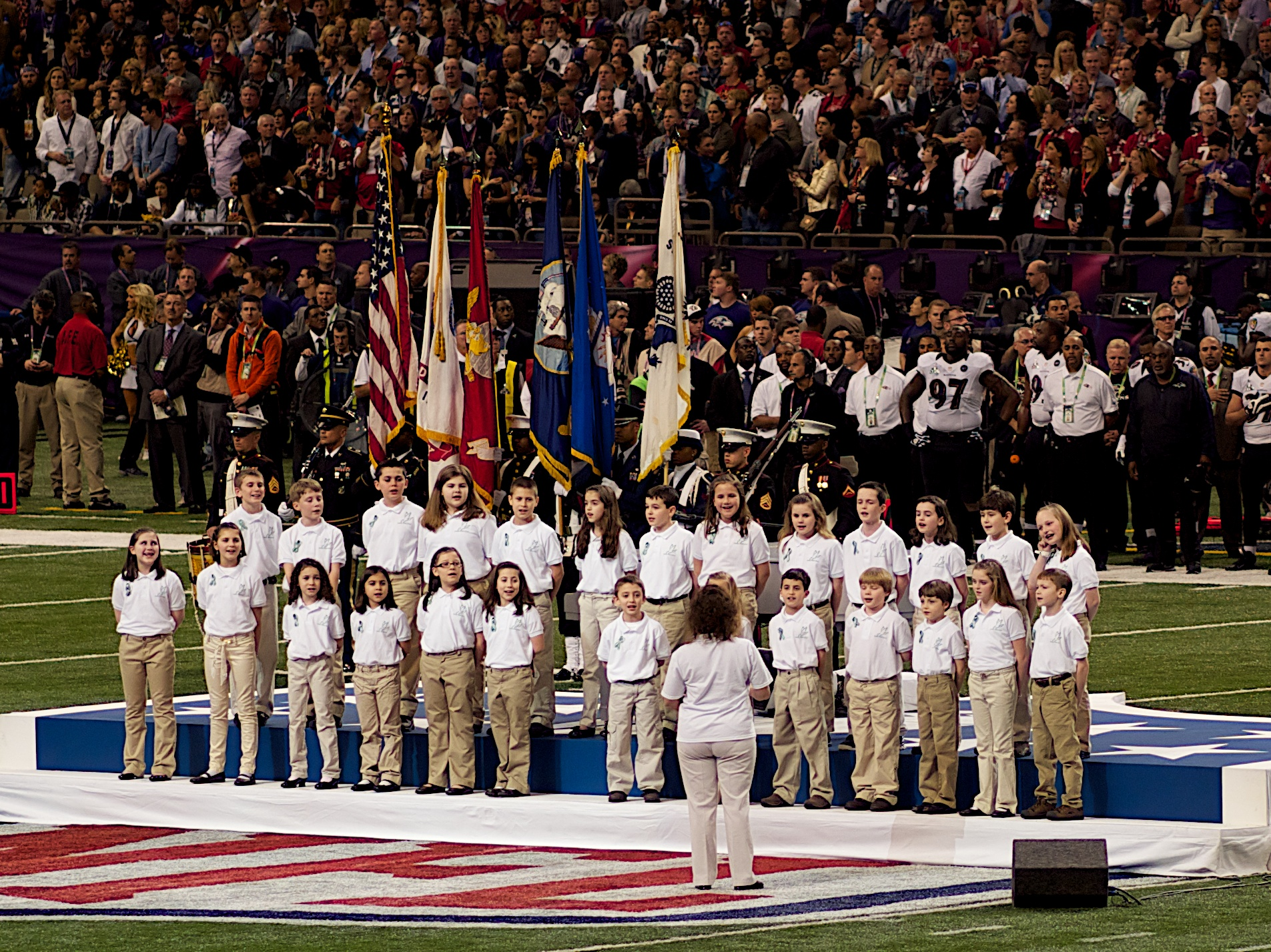
The Sandy Hook Elementary School Chorus performs at Super Bowl XLVII.

The following Super Bowls featured other patriotic performances besides the national anthem. Since 2009, "America the Beautiful" is sung before the national anthem.

=== America the Beautiful ===
No.	Year	Performer(s)
VIII	1974	Charley Pride
IX	1975	New Orleans Chapter of the Society for the Preservation of Barbershop Quartet Singing in America--Chorus
XI	1977	Vikki Carr (in place of the national anthem)
XXXV	2001	Ray Charles
XXXVI	2002	Mary J. Blige, Marc Anthony and the Boston Pops Orchestra
XXXIX	2005	Alicia Keys and a tribute to Ray Charles
XLIII	2009	Faith Hill
XLIV	2010	Queen Latifah
XLV	2011	Lea Michele with Tops In Blue
XLVI	2012	Blake Shelton and Miranda Lambert
XLVII	2013	Jennifer Hudson with the Sandy Hook Elementary School Chorus
XLVIII	2014	Queen Latifah with the New Jersey Youth Chorus
XLIX	2015	John Legend
50	2016	U.S. Armed Forces Chorus
LI	2017	Phillipa Soo, Renée Elise Goldsberry, Jasmine Cephas Jones.
LII	2018	Leslie Odom Jr.
LIII	2019	Chloe x Halle
LIV	2020	Yolanda Adams
LV	2021	H.E.R.
LVI	2022	Jhené Aiko
LVII	2023	Babyface, Colin Denny (PISL)
LVIII	2024	Post Malone, Anjel Piñero (ASL)
LIX	2025	Trombone Shorty and Lauren Daigle
LX	2026	Brandi Carlile, Julian Ortiz (ASL)

=== Lift Every Voice and Sing ===
No.	Year	Performer	ASL
LV	2021	Alicia Keys	—
LVI	2022	Mary Mary with Youth Orchestra of Los Angeles	—
LVII	2023	Sheryl Lee Ralph	Justina Miles
LVIII	2024	Andra Day	Shaheem Sanchez
LIX	2025	Ledisi with Greater New Orleans High School Choral Collective	Otis Jones IV
LX	2026	Coco Jones	Fred Beam

=== Pledge of Allegiance ===
No.	Year	Performer
III	1969	Apollo 8 crew
IV	1970	Apollo 12 crew
VII	1973	Apollo 17 crew

=== God Bless America ===
No.	Year	Performer
XXXVII	2003	Céline Dion

== Multiple and hometown performances ==
Acts that have performed three times:

- Marlee Matlin (ASL), (XXVII, XLI, and 50)
- Alicia Keys, (XXXIX, XLVII, and LV)

Acts that have performed two times:

- GSU Tiger Marching Band (II and IX)
- Billy Joel (XXIII and XLI)
- Aaron Neville (XXIV and XL)
- U.S. Air Force Academy Chorale (VI and XXXIX)
- Queen Latifah (XLIV and XLVIII)
- Faith Hill (XXXIV and XLIII)
- Jennifer Hudson (XLIII and XLVII)

Acts that performed in or near their hometown metropolitan area:

- Herb Alpert (XXII, San Diego)
- Beyoncé (XXXVIII, Houston)
- Aretha Franklin (XL, Detroit)
- Al Hirt (IV, New Orleans)
- Jewel (XXXII, San Diego)
- Aaron Neville (XXIV, New Orleans)
- Diana Ross (XVI, Detroit)
- Backstreet Boys (XXXV, Tampa)
- Jordin Sparks (XLII, Phoenix)
- Queen Latifah (XLVIII, East Rutherford, New Jersey)
- Gladys Knight (LIII, Atlanta)
- Troy Kotsur (LVII, Phoenix)
- Ledisi (LIX, New Orleans)
- Trombone Shorty (LIX, New Orleans)
- Lauren Daigle (LIX, New Orleans)
- Jon Batiste (LIX, New Orleans)

== See also ==
- Super Bowl
- List of Super Bowl halftime shows
