= Tiger Marching Band =

Tiger Marching Band can refer to one of the following:

- GSU Tiger Marching Band, the marching band of Grambling State University
- Louisiana State University Tiger Marching Band
