= Jim Otto =

American football player (1938–2024)

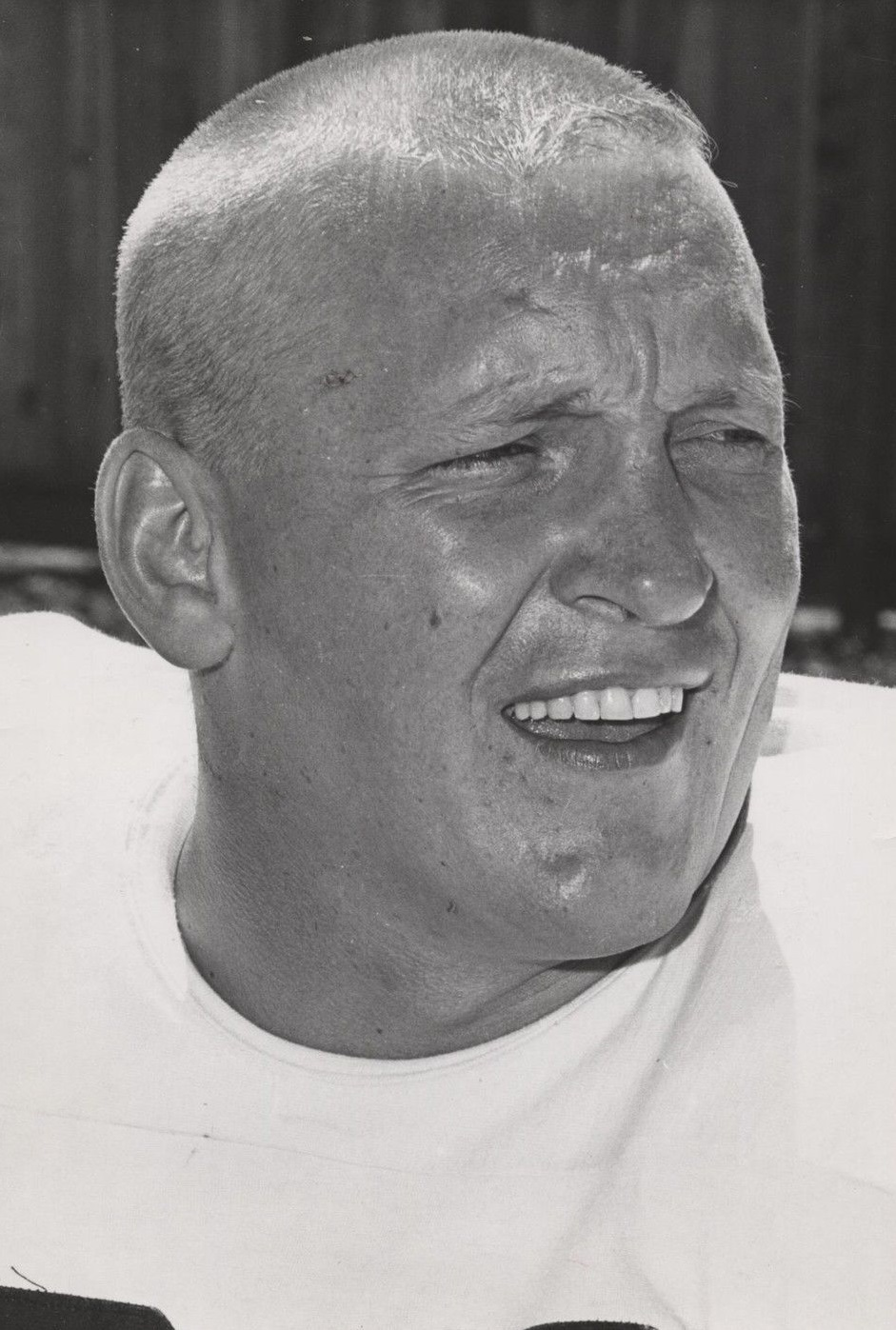
- Otto with the Oakland Raiders

No. 50, 00
- Position: Center

Personal information
- Born: January 5, 1938; Wausau, Wisconsin, U.S.
- Died: May 19, 2024 (aged 86); Auburn, California, U.S.
- Listed height: 6 ft 2 in (1.88 m)
- Listed weight: 255 lb (116 kg)

Career information
- High school: Wausau
- College: Miami (FL) (1957–1959)
- AFL draft: 1960: undrafted

Career history
- Oakland Raiders (1960–1974)

Awards and highlights
- AFL champion (1967); 9× First-team All-AFL (1960–1965, 1967–1969); First-team All-Pro (1970); Second-team All-Pro (1972); Second-team All-AFL (1966); 9× AFL All-Star (1961–1969); 3× Pro Bowl (1970–1972); NFL 100th Anniversary All-Time Team; AFL All-Time Team

Career statistics
- Games played: 210
- Games started: 210
- Fumble recoveries: 3
- Stats at Pro Football Reference
- Pro Football Hall of Fame

James Edwin Otto (January 5, 1938 – May 19, 2024) was an American professional football player who was a center for 15 seasons with the Oakland Raiders of the American Football League (AFL) and National Football League (NFL). He played college football for the Miami Hurricanes.

One of the most durable centers in football history, Otto was named a First-team All-Pro in ten seasons, nine in the AFL and once in the NFL. He was the first player in pro football history to have ten First-team All-Pro selections, a mark achieved only once (Jerry Rice) since. Otto was inducted into the Pro Football Hall of Fame in 1980, his first year of eligibility. He was also named to the AFL All-Time Team and NFL 100th Anniversary All-Time Team.

== Early life and college ==
Otto was born on January 5, 1938, in Wausau, Wisconsin. His parents Lorenz and Loretta (Totsch) Otto worked a variety of jobs to help the family get by, and they had so little when Otto was a boy they could not afford new shoes to keep his feet warm and dry in Wisconsin's winters. Growing up as a child, he wanted to be a football player like Elroy "Crazylegs" Hirsch. He recalled Hirsch once saying, "‘if you put your heart into it, you can do it.’”

Otto played football at Wausau High School from 1953-55. He was a linebacker and center for the Lumberjacks, under coach Win Brockmeyer; who also coached Otto's hero Crazylegs Hirsch at Wausau. Brockmeyer considered Otto a "terrific competitor" with his most important contribution to Wausau's team coming on defense.

Otto, the team co-captain, and the Lumberjacks were 18–5–2 during his high school football career. It has also been reported the team was 21–3–1. He was particularly inspired by his offensive line coach, Tom Yelich. At a 1980 banquet honoring Otto in Wausau, Otto credited Yelich with teaching the technique Otto then used throughout college and professional football. “'Yelich was the first coach I ever had, and he helped me more than any coach since.'”

Otto broke his ankle in high school one season. Instead of sitting out, he taped it up before each game and played on it throughout the season.

Otto had offers from 48 colleges to play college football, and with the help of Brockmeyer chose the University of Miami in South Florida, where he played varsity football from 1957 to 1959 under coach Andy Gustafson. In addition to playing offensive center at the University of Miami, he also played linebacker on defense. He became the team's starting center as a junior in 1958, weighing only 193 pounds (87.5 kg). As a senior, he played in the North-South Shrine game for the South college all star team at center.

While at Miami, he joined the Phi Delta Theta fraternity.

Otto was inducted into the University of Miami Sports Hall of Fame and Museum in 1972.

== Professional career ==
No National Football League team showed interest in the undersized center, who weighed only 205 pounds. Otto was signed in 1960 as an undrafted free agent by the Oakland Raiders, the team that replaced a proposed Minneapolis AFL franchise that instead had withdrawn to join the NFL in 1961. After he signed with the Raiders, he played there for the entire 10 years of the league's existence and five years beyond that after the merger of the NFL and AFL. In his rookie year at training camp, he weighed 217 pounds, but was up to 240 pounds by the end of his first year.

Otto worked diligently to build his body up to his playing weight of 255 pounds (116 kg). Otto wore the jersey number 50 in his rookie season, but the suggestion of equipment manager Frank Hinek led to the idea of Otto wearing 00 (0 was being worn in the NFL by Johnny Olszewski) "for recognition", which Otto eventually went with, as did AFL Commissioner Joe Foss.

For the next 15 years, Otto was a fixture at center for the Raiders, never missing a single game due to injury, and played in 210 consecutive games. He won one AFL/AFC championship in 1967 against the Houston Oilers with the Raiders, but lost five: in 1968, 1969, 1970, 1973, and 1974 to the New York Jets, Kansas City Chiefs, Baltimore Colts, Miami Dolphins, and Pittsburgh Steelers, respectively, with all five teams winning the Super Bowl.

He played alongside Gene Upshaw, another Hall of Famer, at left guard from 1967 to 1974. In the 1967 regular season, Oakland scored 468 points (33.4 points/game), leading the AFL, but lost Super Bowl II to the Green Bay Packers. In 1968, Oakland scored 453 points (32.4 points/game) in the regular season, again leading the AFL, and beat the Chiefs in the divisional round (unscheduled tiebreaker), 41–6, before losing to the Jets, 27–23.

In the 1969 regular season, Oakland scored 377 points (26.9 points/game) to lead the AFL for the third consecutive year, and beat the Houston Oilers in the new divisional round of the AFL playoffs, 56–7, before losing to the Chiefs, 17–7, in the final AFL Championship Game. In the 1970 regular season, the first year of the NFL-AFL merger, Oakland scored 300 points (21.4 points/game), ranking ninth in the 26-team NFL, and beat the Miami Dolphins in the AFC playoffs, 21–14, before losing to the Baltimore Colts in the AFL Championship Game, 27–17. The Raiders missed the playoffs for the first time in five years in 1971, despite scoring 344 points (24.6 points/game), second highest in the NFL.

The Raiders came back stronger in 1972, scoring 365 points (26.1 points/game), ranking third in the NFL, but lost 13–7 to the Pittsburgh Steelers in the divisional round of the AFC playoffs. The game became famous as the Immaculate Reception game, in which Otto also made the only pass reception of his professional career. Otto claimed he had a close and clear view of the immaculate reception play involving the Raiders' Jack Tatum hitting the Steelers' receiver John "Frenchy" Fuqua with the ball floating into the hands of the Steelers' Franco Harris who scored the game-winning touchdown with less than one minute to play. Otto had no doubt that the pass should have been deemed incomplete under the then current NFL rules, and the Raiders should have won the game. During the 15-minute delay while the officials determined how they were going to call the play, Otto feared for his safety from inebriated Steeler fans if the call went against the Steelers, and plotted how he would escape the fans should they have rushed onto the field. The outcome disturbed Otto for years, though he did not bear the Steelers' players any ill-will.

In the 1973 regular season, Oakland scored 292 points (20.9 points/game), tenth in the NFL, and avenged their defeat to the Steelers, 33–14 in the division round of the 1973 playoffs, but lost to the Dolphins in the AFC Championship Game, 27–10. In Otto's final year, 1974, Oakland scored 355 points (25.4 points/game), leading the NFL, and avenged their playoff loss to the Dolphins in the divisional round, 28–26, but lost to the Steelers again in the AFC Championship Game, 24–13.

During the last three years of his career with the Raiders, he would have his knee injected with xylocaine and drained three times a week with a long syringe. Before games on Sunday, he would have his knee braced and would take Darvon before playing each game. He had a bone graft before coming to training camp in 1975, but it failed after 2½ weeks.

Otto had knee surgery after the 1974 season, his fifth or sixth knee surgery, and had a swollen knee going into training camp. He retired before the 1975 season started after a series of discussions with Raiders' owner Al Davis. His last game was an exhibition game against the San Francisco 49ers. An important factor in choosing to retire instead of continuing to play another year at an inferior level was reading about a player who suffered a dislocated knee that severed an artery, requiring amputation. The 37-year old Otto was replaced by 24-year old Dave Dalby, in his fourth season out of UCLA. Otto went to great lengths to teach Dalby the nuances and techniques of how to play the position during their time together; and even helped Dalby after retiring. Otto was the last member of the Oakland Raiders inaugural team from 1960 to retire, and Otto then worked in the Raiders' front office immediately after retirement.

== Legacy and honors ==
Otto was elected to the Pro Football Hall of Fame in 1980, his first year of eligibility. In 1999, he was ranked number 78 on The Sporting News' list of the 100 Greatest Football Players. In 2019, he was selected to the National Football League 100th Anniversary All-Time Team, being one of only four centers named. In 2021, he was the 97th greatest player of all time listed by The Athletic.

Otto was one of the original Oakland Raiders, and played during the team's full tenure in the AFL, from 1960 to 1969. He continued as a Raider in the NFL from 1970 to 1974, starting 210 consecutive games for the Raiders. He was one of only 20 players to play for the entire ten-year existence of the American Football League, and one of only three players to play in all of his team's AFL games (along with teammate George Blanda and Gino Cappelletti).

Otto was also selected as The Sporting News All-League center from 1960 through 1969. He was an AFL All-Star or NFL Pro Bowl in the first 13 of his 15 seasons – every year in the AFL from 1960 through 1969 and three of his five seasons in the NFL, being All-NFL in 1970 and 1971 and second-team All-NFL in 1972. He played in 12 All-Star games and was All-League 12 consecutive years.

In 1966, the Associated Press (AP) named Jon Morris first-team All-AFL at center and Otto second-team All-AFL at center; though The Sporting News, Newspaper Enterprise Association (NEA) and United Press International (UPI) named Otto first-team All-AFL in 1966 and selected Morris to the second team. Otto was also named the starting center on the AFL All-Time Team. He is one of only three players (along with Hall of Famers Johnny Robinson and Ron Mix), who were on the All-AFL first-team and the combined AFL/NFL All-Decade Team for the 1960s.

During his career, the Raiders won seven divisional championships from 1967 through 1974, and were AFL champions in 1967, meeting the Green Bay Packers in Super Bowl II. Otto's offensive linemates with the Raiders included Hall of Famers Gene Upshaw, Art Shell, and Bob Brown. Hall of Fame and NFL 100th Anniversary All-Time Team coach Bill Walsh, who was an offensive assistant coach with the 1966 Raiders said of Otto, "'He had techniques others tried to emulate but couldn’t. ... I used to marvel at his skills. He played every down with intensity.'” Rival Kansas City Chiefs linebacker Bobby Bell, a Hall of Famer, 100th Anniversary All-Time teammate, and himself a member of the AFL's All-Time Team, said Otto was the best center he ever played against.

Otto was elected to the Wisconsin Athletic Hall of Fame in 1998.

== Injuries and operations ==
Otto's body was punished greatly during his NFL career, resulting in nearly 74 operations, including 28 on his knee (nine of them during his playing career) and multiple joint replacements. His joints became riddled with arthritis and he developed debilitating back and neck problems. By his early 40s, he was considered permanently and totally disabled, and in 1980 he suffered deep depression for the first time due to the ongoing pain he experienced. In his book, The Pain of Glory, Otto described near-death experiences from medical procedures, including fighting off three life-threatening infections due to complications from his artificial joints. During one six-month stretch, he was without a right knee joint because he had to wait for an infection to heal before another artificial knee could be implanted. Otto eventually had to have his right leg amputated on August 1, 2007. Despite his maladies, Otto said he had no regrets and would not have changed a thing even if given the opportunity to do it over again. He discussed his sports injuries as well as the concussions issue in a 2013 Frontline interview for "League of Denial: The NFL's Concussion Crisis" and the 1985 documentary "Disposable Heroes: The Other Side of Football", directed by Bill Couturié.

== Personal life and death ==
After his career, Otto worked for the Raiders during two periods, and then made a "small fortune" from Burger King franchises, liquor stores, a walnut orchard, and real estate in the Oakland area.

Otto was also the subject of The Jim Otto Suite, a series of three multimedia works by American contemporary artist Matthew Barney, which served as a precursor to The Cremaster Cycle.

He was the grandfather of dog musher Amanda Otto.

Otto died on May 19, 2024, at the age of 86.

== See also ==
- Bay Area Sports Hall of Fame
- List of most consecutive starts by National Football League players
- Other American Football League players
