= Dick Capp =

American football player (born 1942)

No. 88, 67
- Position: Linebacker / tight end

Personal information
- Born: April 9, 1942 (age 84); Portland, Maine, U.S.
- Listed height: 6 ft 4 in (1.93 m)
- Listed weight: 240 lb (109 kg)

Career information
- High school: Portland (ME) Deering
- College: Boston College
- AFL draft: 1966: 17th round, 147th overall pick

Career history
- Boston Patriots (1966)*; → Lowell Giants (1966); Green Bay Packers (1967); St. Louis Cardinals (1968)*; Pittsburgh Steelers (1968)
- * Offseason or practice squad member only

Awards and highlights
- NFL champion (1967); Super Bowl champion (II)

Career statistics
- Games played: 16
- Stats at Pro Football Reference

Richard Francis Capp (born April 9, 1942) is an American former professional football player who was a linebacker and tight end. From Portland, Maine, he played college football for the Boston College Eagles and was selected by the Boston Patriots in the 17th round of the 1966 American Football League draft. After a season with the Patriots' taxi squad and playing with the minor league Lowell Giants, he was signed by the Green Bay Packers in 1967. He appeared in two regular season games for the Packers and was later activated for Super Bowl II, where he recovered a fumble in the Packers' win. He later was a member of the St. Louis Cardinals and concluded his career with the Pittsburgh Steelers.

== Early life ==
Capp was born on April 9, 1942, in Portland, Maine. He attended Deering High School in Portland where he competed in football, baseball, basketball and track and field. He was an All-Maine selection at end in football and helped Deering win the 1959 state championship, their first. In high school, Capp was "tall and lean", standing at 6 feet 3 inches (1.91 m) while weighing 170 pounds (77 kg). After attending Deering, Capp spent a post-graduate year at Worcester Academy in Massachusetts before enrolling at Boston College to play basketball for the Boston College Eagles, having no intention of playing football there.

== College career ==
Capp attended Boston College from 1962 to 1965. He did not play football in his first year and instead played basketball. In a summer spent at his parents' house, he began lifting weights and "drank milkshakes loaded with half a dozen raw eggs"; according to the Portland Press Herald, "Fifty pounds later, bony and lanky became a rock-solid 6 feet 4 inches (1.93 m), 255 pounds (116 kg)". During a basketball practice, Capp was noticed by the football team's coach and invited to join. Capp made the team at end in 1963 and then was shifted to start at right tackle due to injuries. Later on, he was moved to playing defensive end for Boston College, then finally to linebacker. As a senior in 1965, he was described as one of Boston College's "defensive stars". Capp also spent two years on the varsity basketball team for the Eagles.

== Professional career ==
Capp was selected by the Boston Patriots in the 17th round (147th overall) of the 1966 American Football League draft. He signed with the Patriots in June 1966. Prior to the season, he trained for two weeks in the United States Army Reserve, which left him "ill-prepared for football". In preseason, he was "manhandled" by lineman Art Shell, and afterwards, he was one of the team's last roster cuts. He subsequently joined the team's taxi squad and was sent to the Lowell Giants of the minor Atlantic Coast Football League (ACFL). During the 1966 ACFL season, he "played brilliantly" for Lowell and scored one touchdown on an interception return.

Green Bay Packers head coach Vince Lombardi was interested in a kicker who played for the Giants and while watching film, became interested in Capp as well, saying to "Bring that kid playing linebacker". He was brought to the Packers' camp and after impressing there, was signed for the 1967 season as a linebacker and tight end. He then joined the team after completing two weeks of military service. Capp recalled that Lombardi "just liked guys that would run down the field, hit somebody and add to the special teams. That was something I could do". He ended up making the final roster for the Packers. After being active for the first two games, he was placed on the taxi squad after the return of an injured Willie Davis.

According to the Press Herald, "Capp spent the rest of the season working in practice and wearing a headset on the sideline during games, relaying messages from defensive assistants in the press box to the defensive coordinator on the field". He held this role during the 1967 NFL Championship Game, otherwise known as the "Ice Bowl" for its temperature of negative 13 °F. He recalled that "I had to stand there. It would've been better to play. It's the closest I've ever been in my life ... [to] quitting". The next week, he was activated by the Packers for Super Bowl II against the Oakland Raiders. With the Packers winning 13–7 in the second quarter, Capp made a key play that contributed to their victory. A punt to Raider Rodger Bird was muffed and Capp recovered, allowing the Packers to retain possession and later increase their lead; they ended up winning by a score of 33–14. By participating, Capp became the only person from Maine ever to play in the Super Bowl, a distinction he still held by 2016.

Prior to the 1968 season, Capp was traded by the Packers to the St. Louis Cardinals. Then, at the start of the season, he was traded from the Cardinals to the Pittsburgh Steelers. He appeared in all 14 games for the Steelers during the 1968 season as a linebacker. He was waived by the Steelers in July 1969. He did not play for any other team in his career, finishing with 16 games played.

== Later life ==
Capp married and had several children. After playing for the Steelers, he began working for Procter & Gamble. He later moved with his family to St. Louis, Missouri, then to Dallas, Texas, and later to Cary, North Carolina. In Cary, he ran a business that distributed cleaning detergent.
