= Bill Miller (wide receiver) =

American football player (1940–2024)

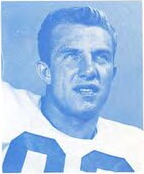
- Miller, c. 1961

No. 82, 81, 89
- Position: Wide receiver

Personal information
- Born: April 17, 1940; McKeesport, Pennsylvania, U.S.
- Died: December 14, 2024 (aged 84); St. Augustine, Florida, U.S.
- Listed height: 6 ft 1 in (1.85 m)
- Listed weight: 195 lb (88 kg)

Career information
- High school: McKeesport
- College: Miami (FL)
- NFL draft: 1962: 3rd round, 30th overall pick
- AFL draft: 1962: 2nd round, 11th overall pick

Career history

Playing
- Dallas Texans (1962); Buffalo Bills (1963); Oakland Raiders (1964-1968)

Coaching
- Buffalo Bills (1969) Ends coach

Awards and highlights
- 2× AFL champion (1962, 1967); Consensus All-American (1961); First-team All-American (1960)

Career AFL statistics
- Receptions: 141
- Receiving yards: 1,879
- Receiving touchdowns: 10
- Stats at Pro Football Reference

William Joseph Miller (April 17, 1940 – December 14, 2024) was an American professional football player who was a wide receiver for six seasons in the American Football League (AFL). He played college football for the Miami Hurricanes. He played in the AFL for the Dallas Texans (1962), the Buffalo Bills (1963), and the Oakland Raiders (1964–1968).

== Early life and education ==
Miller was born in McKeesport, Pennsylvania, on April 17, 1940. He attended the University of Miami, where he played college football for the Miami Hurricanes. At the University of Miami, he was a member of the Lambda Chi Alpha fraternity.

== Professional football ==
Miller launched his professional football career with the Dallas Texans in 1962.

Miller played in 66 games in his career, garnering 141 receptions for 1,879 yards and 10 touchdowns. In five career playoff games, he caught 9 passes for 121 yards and three touchdowns. Miller was 4th in receptions in 1963 with 69 catches, while being 7th in receiving yards with 860 and 8th in receiving yards per game at 61.4. He was named to the 2nd Team in the All-AFL level by the Associated Press that year. Miller caught two touchdown passes in Super Bowl II in 1968, the only scores from quarterback Daryle Lamonica in the Oakland Raiders' 33–14 loss to the Green Bay Packers. Miller's five catches led all receivers in the game.

== Post-NFL life ==
After he retired, Miller served as an assistant coach for the Buffalo Bills for three seasons. He also worked at Hutchinson Central Technical High School as a substitute teacher. He started up a sports bar and later an exotic dance club in Miami called the Bird's Nest for several years. He is on the list of retired players that will receive brain testing for Alzheimer's disease, memory loss or dementia as part of the NFL plan to address injuries linked to concussions. He later resided in St. Augustine, Florida, where he died on December 14, 2024, at the age of 84.

== See also ==
- List of American Football League players
