= Gus Otto =

American football player (born 1943)

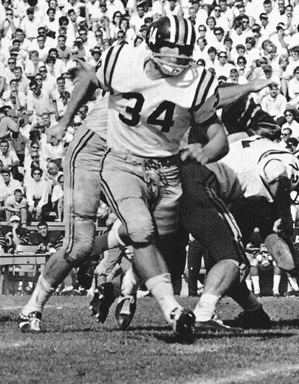

No. 34
- Position: Linebacker

Personal information
- Born: December 8, 1943 (age 82); St. Louis, Missouri, U.S.
- Listed height: 6 ft 1 in (1.85 m)
- Listed weight: 220 lb (100 kg)

Career information
- College: Missouri
- AFL draft: 1965: 4th round, 27 (by the Oakland Raiders)th overall pick

Career history
- Oakland Raiders (1965–1972)

Awards and highlights
- AFL champion (1967); 4× All-Pro (1967–1970); AFL All-Star (1969); First-team All-Big Eight (1964)
- Stats at Pro Football Reference

Gus Otto (born December 8, 1943) is an American former professional football player who was a linebacker for the Oakland Raiders of the American Football League (AFL) and National Football League (NFL). He played for the Raiders in the AFL from 1965 through 1969 and in the NFL from 1970 to 1972. Otto played college football for the Missouri Tigers.

== See also ==
- List of American Football League players
