= Dan Conners =

American football player (1942–2019)

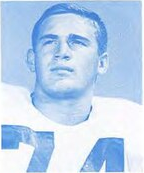
- Conners in 1963

No. 60, 55
- Position: Linebacker

Personal information
- Born: February 6, 1942; St. Marys, Pennsylvania, U.S.
- Died: April 28, 2019 (aged 77); San Luis Obispo, California, U.S.
- Listed height: 6 ft 2 in (1.88 m)
- Listed weight: 230 lb (104 kg)

Career information
- High school: St. Marys
- College: Miami (FL) (1960–1963)
- NFL draft: 1964: 5th round, 70th overall pick
- AFL draft: 1964: 2nd round, 15th overall pick

Career history
- Oakland Raiders (1964–1974)

Awards and highlights
- AFL champion (1967); 3× AFL All-Star (1967–1969); AFL All-Time Second Team

Career AFL/NFL statistics
- Sacks: 12
- Interceptions: 15
- Interception yards: 232
- Fumble recoveries: 16
- Defensive touchdowns: 5
- Stats at Pro Football Reference

Daniel Joseph Conners (February 6, 1942 – April 28, 2019) was an American professional football linebacker who played 11 seasons for the Oakland Raiders of the American Football League (AFL) from 1964 through 1969 and later in the National Football League (NFL) from 1970 through 1974. He played college football for the Miami Hurricanes and is enshrined in their Hall of Fame.

== Early life ==
Born in Clearfield, Pennsylvania, Conners was raised in St. Marys, Pennsylvania, and was a 1959 graduate of St. Marys high school. He led the Flying Dutchmen to undefeated seasons in 1957 and 1958 as a fullback and center while also earning varsity letters in wrestling and baseball.

That got the attention of the University of Miami (Fla.) where Conners began his college career as a center on the freshman team. He then moved to offensive tackle and then started to make a significant impact on the defensive side of the ball at tackle.

The eventual University of Miami Hall of Famer was 6-foot-2, 240 pounds by his senior year and broke the season record for tackles at that time with 57 tackles and 38 assists in 1962. In 1963, Conners was named an All-American defensive tackle.

== Pro career ==
In the spring of 1964, Conners was drafted twice — by the Chicago Bears in the fifth round (70th pick) in the NFL draft and by the Raiders in the second round (15th overall) of the AFL draft.

Conners signed with the Raiders and started an 11-year career that continued through 1974. Conners moved to middle linebacker and helped anchor the defensive unit that helped lead the team to the playoffs in seven of his 11 seasons, 13 games in all.

In 1967, Conners and the Raiders reached the Super Bowl after going 13–1 in the AFL and beating the Houston Oilers, 40–7, for the league title as Conners had a fumble recovery. Against the powerful NFL champion Green Bay Packers in the second-ever Super Bowl, the Raiders lost 33–14.

The next year, the Raiders reached the AFL title game before losing to the eventual Super Bowl champion New York Jets, 27–23. During the regular season, Conners played in the infamous "Heidi Bowl" in which the Raiders scored two touchdowns in the final minute of a 43–32 win. However, NBC pre-empted the fantastic finish to go to its regular-scheduled feature film Heidi, causing predictable outrage.

The Raiders reached the AFL title game again in 1969 and lost to another eventual Super Bowl champion, this time hated rival Kansas City Chiefs, 17–7. Conners recovered a fumble in the loss. In 1970, after the merger of the NFL and AFL, the Raiders lost the American Football Conference championship game 17–7 to the Baltimore Colts, again the eventual Super Bowl champion.

Oakland missed the playoffs in 1971 and reached the postseason again in 1972, winning the AFC West with a 10-3-1 record. In the first round of the playoffs, the Raiders locked up with an emerging power and arch-rival in the Pittsburgh Steelers at Three Rivers Stadium. In what was dubbed the Immaculate Reception game, it was Conners and the Raiders losing 13–7 on the final play of the game when Franco Harris grabbed a deflected pass out of the air and rambled into the end zone for the miracle finish. The Steelers wound up losing to the eventual unbeaten Super Bowl champion Miami Dolphins the next week.

Back again in 1973, the Raiders won the AFC West, avenged the loss to the Steelers in the first round of the playoffs, and lost to the eventual Super Bowl champion Dolphins in the conference final, 27–10.

Conners' final season of 1974 saw the Raiders win the AFC West once again with a 12–2 mark, the best record in the NFL. After beating the defending champion Dolphins 28–26 in the first round in the famous "Sea of Hands" game, the Raiders lost at home to another eventual Super Bowl champion as the Steelers, down 10-3 going into the fourth quarter, outscored the Raiders 21–3 in the final quarter to win 24–13. The Steelers went on to win their first Super Bowl, beating the Vikings, 16–6.

Conners appeared in 141 games with the Raiders, 110 of them as a starter. While tackles weren't considered an official statistic until much later, Conners had 15 interceptions, returning three of them for touchdowns, and he recovered 16 fumbles, returning two for scores.

Conners made several postseason All-Pro teams, mostly during a stretch from 1967 through 1969. He was a second-team all-AFL pick in 1967 by the Associated Press, United Press International and The Sporting News. In 1968, he earned first-team All-AFL honors by UPI and Pro Football Weekly and second-team by the AP. In 1969, he was a first-team All-AFL pick by The Sporting News and second-team by the AP.

Conners was named as one of the six linebackers on the AFL Hall of Fame All-1960s Team, joining the likes of Bobby Bell, Nick Buoniconti, George Webster, Larry Grantham, and Mike Stratton. The Chiefs' Bell and the Dolphins' Buoniconti are Pro Football Hall of Famers.

In Conners' 11 seasons, the Raiders won seven division titles and compiled a 105-38-11 regular-season record (.718 winning percentage). He was a foundational piece of the Raiders' defense over that period. Two years after he retired, the Raiders won their first Super Bowl title against the Vikings in 1976.

== Later life ==
After his retirement, Conners remained in football as an assistant coach for the San Francisco 49ers then as a scout for the Tampa Bay Buccaneers before returning to the Raiders as a scout. Upon retiring from the organization after 25 years, he lived in the San Luis Obispo area, frequenting McCarthy's Irish Pub and the local Elks Lodge on a daily basis. He died on April 28, 2019 at the age of 77.

== See also ==
- List of American Football League players
