= Ben Davidson =

American football player (1940–2012)

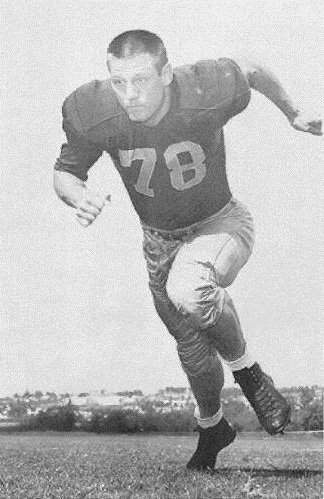
- 1960 Washington Huskies yearbook

No. 72, 75, 83, 78
- Positions: Defensive end, defensive tackle

Personal information
- Born: June 14, 1940; Los Angeles, California, U.S.
- Died: July 2, 2012 (aged 72); San Diego, California, U.S.
- Listed height: 6 ft 8 in (2.03 m)
- Listed weight: 275 lb (125 kg)

Career information
- High school: Woodrow Wilson (Los Angeles)
- College: East Los Angeles College (1957-1958); Washington (1959-1960)
- NFL draft: 1961: 4th round, 46th overall pick

Career history
- Green Bay Packers (1961); Washington Redskins (1962–1963); Oakland Raiders (1964–1971); Portland Storm (1974)

Awards and highlights
- NFL champion (1961); AFL champion (1967); 3× AFL All-Star (1966, 1967, 1968)

Career NFL/AFL statistics
- Fumble recoveries: 2
- Sacks: 64.5
- Stats at Pro Football Reference

Benjamin Earl Davidson (June 14, 1940 – July 2, 2012) was an American professional football player who was a defensive end, primarily with the Oakland Raiders of the American Football League (AFL). He was a three-time AFL All-Star with the Raiders. Earlier in his career, Davidson was with the Green Bay Packers and Washington Redskins of the National Football League (NFL). He later worked as an actor.

== Early life ==
Born and raised in Los Angeles, California, Davidson was the son of Avis (née Wheat) and Benjamin Earl Franklin, Senior. He attended Woodrow Wilson High School in the El Sereno neighborhood of Los Angeles, but did not play football in high school; because of his height (6 ft 8 in (2.03 m)), basketball and track were more to his liking. While attending junior college at East Los Angeles College, he was spotted by the football coach and asked to join the team. He was subsequently recruited to play at the University of Washington in Seattle in 1959, where he flourished as a member of consecutive Rose Bowl-winning teams under head coach Jim Owens and gained entry into professional football.

== Professional career ==
=== NFL ===
Davidson was selected 46th overall in the fourth round of the 1961 NFL draft by the New York Giants, but was traded in training camp to the Green Bay Packers.

As a rookie, he played mostly special teams for the Packers in 1961, who beat the Giants 37–0 in the championship game, the first of five NFL titles for head coach Vince Lombardi. During training camp in 1962, Davidson was traded to the Washington Redskins for a fifth round draft choice. He played there in 1962 and 1963, until he was waived in September 1964 final cuts after not meeting the team's strict weight guidelines.

=== AFL ===
Davidson is best remembered for his play with the American Football League Oakland Raiders. Al Davis signed him as a free agent shortly after his release from the Redskins and he thrived as a pass rusher under head coaches Davis, John Rauch, and John Madden. Davidson played in Oakland from 1964 through 1972, and was part of the league merger in 1970. He was an AFL All-Star in 1966, 1967, and 1968.

The Raiders won the AFL championship in 1967 and played in Super Bowl II, but were overmatched by the Green Bay Packers. Oakland advanced to the AFL title games the next two seasons but lost to the New York Jets in 1968 and the Kansas City Chiefs in 1969, the league's last game. A stretched Achilles tendon in 1972 kept him on the sidelines that entire season.

==== NFL merger and Dawson–Taylor incident ====
On November 1, 1970, after the AFL-NFL merger, the defending champion Kansas City Chiefs led the Raiders 17–14 late in the fourth quarter. A long run for a first-down by Chiefs quarterback Len Dawson apparently sealed victory for the Chiefs in the final minute when Dawson, as he lay on the ground, was speared by Davidson, who dove into Dawson with his helmet at full running speed, provoking Chiefs' receiver Otis Taylor to attack Davidson. After a bench-clearing brawl, offsetting penalties were called, nullifying the first down under the rules in effect at that time. The Chiefs were obliged to punt, and the Raiders tied the game on a George Blanda field goal with eight seconds to play. Davidson's play not only cost the Chiefs a win, but Oakland won the AFC West with a season record of 8–4–2, while Kansas City finished 7–5–2 and out of the playoffs. After the season, the NFL changed its rules regarding personal fouls, separating those called during a play from those called after it. In 1976, the NFL further modified its rules, explicitly calling out a late hit such as Davidson's as illegal.

Davidson's hit on Dawson was not an isolated occurrence; Winston Hill, a Jets player of the era, called Davidson "the No. 1 cheap-shot artist" in the league. A journalist for The New York Times wrote that Davidson "probably was responsible for more late hits than any other player" of his time, and was known for going after the opposing team's quarterback. Davidson cultivated a persona as a "villain" and embraced this reputation, even wearing a handlebar mustache.

=== WFL ===
Three years out of football, Davidson signed with the Portland Storm in early September 1974, already midway through the World Football League's inaugural 1974 season. While with the Storm, he lived in his motor home that he drove up from California. A late season knee injury from a late hit in early November ended his season and playing career.

== Entertainment career ==
Davidson appeared in a few films including The Black Six, M*A*S*H, and Conan the Barbarian. He portrayed Porter the Bouncer in Behind the Green Door in 1972 and a convict football player in Necessary Roughness in 1991. Davidson played himself in Miller Lite ads featuring John Madden and Rodney Dangerfield. He also appeared in the short lived 1976 show Ball Four as a minor-league baseball player named Rhino Rhinelander, the 1977 pilot for Lucan and the 1984 TV movie Goldie and the Bears. Davidson also appeared in the Happy Days episode "Rules to Date By" (1978) as a lumberjack. He also appeared in the series premiere of Banacek in 1972. In a 1978 first-season episode of CHiPs, "Hitch-Hiking Hitch", Davidson played a character known as Wrestler who picked up and moved a VW Bug and two CHP motorcycles to clear a parking space for his truck. When confronted by Sgt. Getraer, Davidson sheepishly asks if he could move them back to the street to avoid getting a ticket.

== Personal life ==
Following his rookie season with Green Bay, Davidson took his winner's check ($5,195) from the 1961 NFL title game and bought rental property in Seattle, beginning a lifelong and successful focus on residential real estate. He began 1961 with a Rose Bowl win on January 2 and ended it with an NFL championship on December 31. In between he was wed and celebrated the birth of his first child.

Davidson and fellow Oakland Raider teammate Tom Keating were avid motorcycle riders and completed both a ride from California to the Panama Canal and a four-month, 14,000-mile (23,000 km) trip across the United States while with the Raiders.

Davidson died of prostate cancer at age 72. He was retired and living in San Diego and was survived by his wife Kathy, and daughters Janella, Dana, and Vicky. Coincidentally, Davidson's former Raiders teammate and motorcycle buddy, Tom Keating, died two months after him, also as a result of prostate cancer.

== See also ==
- Other American Football League players
