= GSU Tiger Marching Band =

Student band at Grambling State University

- School: Grambling State University
- Location: Grambling, Louisiana
- Conference: SWAC
- Founded: 1926
- Director: Nikole Roebuck
- Members: 200
- Website: GSU Tiger Marching Band website

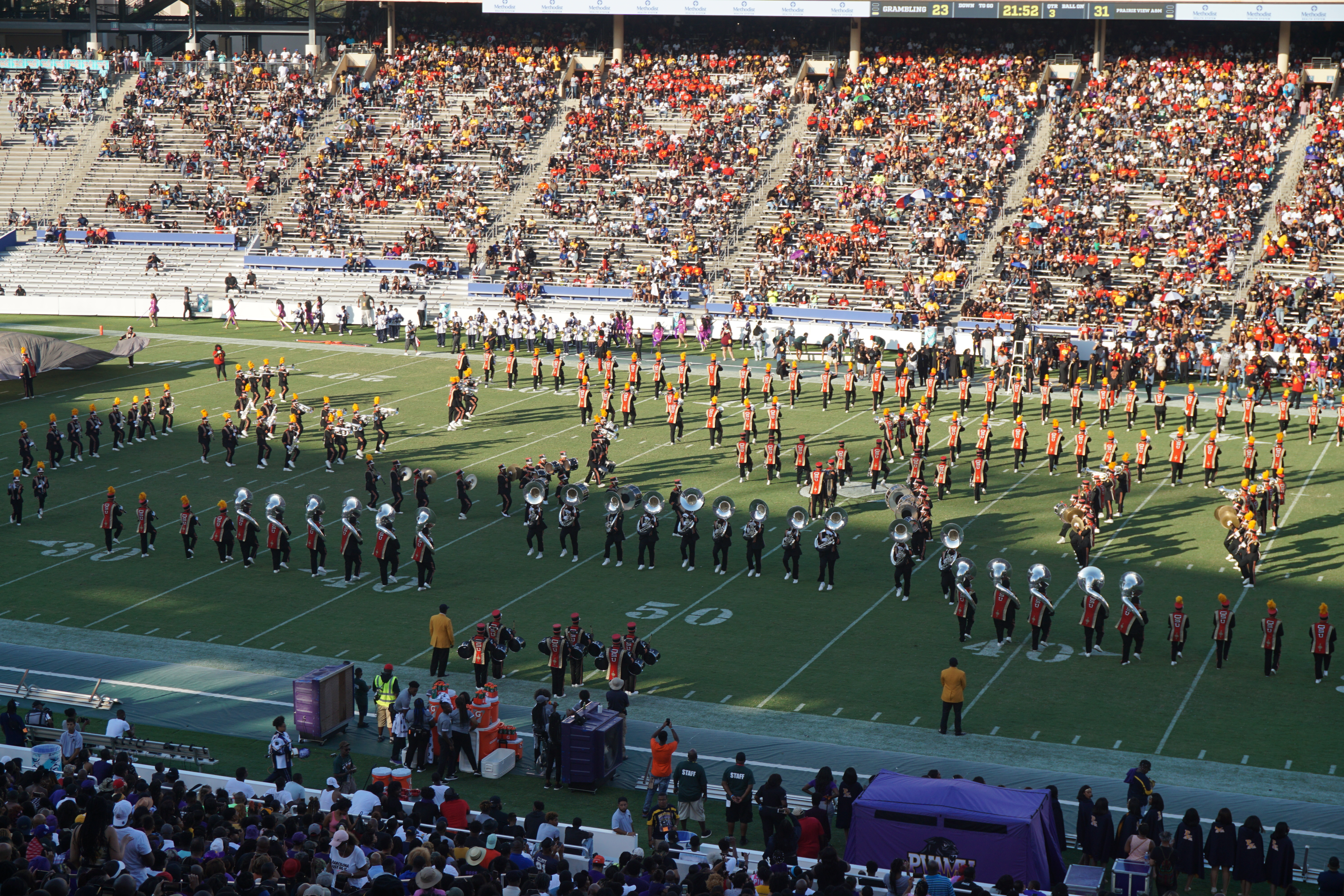
The GSU Tiger Marching Band performing during halftime of the 2019 State Fair Classic

GSU Tiger Marching Band, also known as the Tiger Marching Band, is Grambling State University's marching band. It is often billed as the "World Famed Tiger Marching Band". Ralph Waldo Emerson Jones founded the band in 1926.

== History ==
In 1978, the Tiger Marching Band introduced their first all-female dance line, Orchesis, at halftime of the Bayou Classic, led by artistic director/choreographer Virgie Broussard (Pradia).

== Performances ==
- In 1967 and 1968, the band performed in Super Bowls I and II, respectively, prior to the NFL championship game being officially called The Super Bowl. Grambling's 1967 performance has been named "One of the Top 10 Super Bowl Halftime Shows" by Sports Illustrated magazine.
- In 1972, the marching Tigers played in Monrovia, Liberia, at the inauguration of Liberian President William R. Tolbert.
- In September 1976, the GSU band performed in the first-ever college football game played in Tokyo, Japan, as Grambling State defeated Morgan State, 42–16.
- In 1977, the Tiger Marching Band performed in the first Mirage Bowl in Tokyo, Japan.
- In 1981, the band performed in the Hollywood film Grambling's White Tiger.
- Also in 1981, the band appeared in "Marching Band/Coke Is It," an award-winning television commercial developed for Coca-Cola USA by Burrell Communications Group.
- In 1982, the Tiger Marching Band was a special guest to the Emperor of Japan, performing in Osaka and were halftime performers at the Mirage Bowl in Tokyo.
- In 1999, U.S. President Bill Clinton performed (on saxophone) with the band for a halftime show in Grambling, Louisiana.

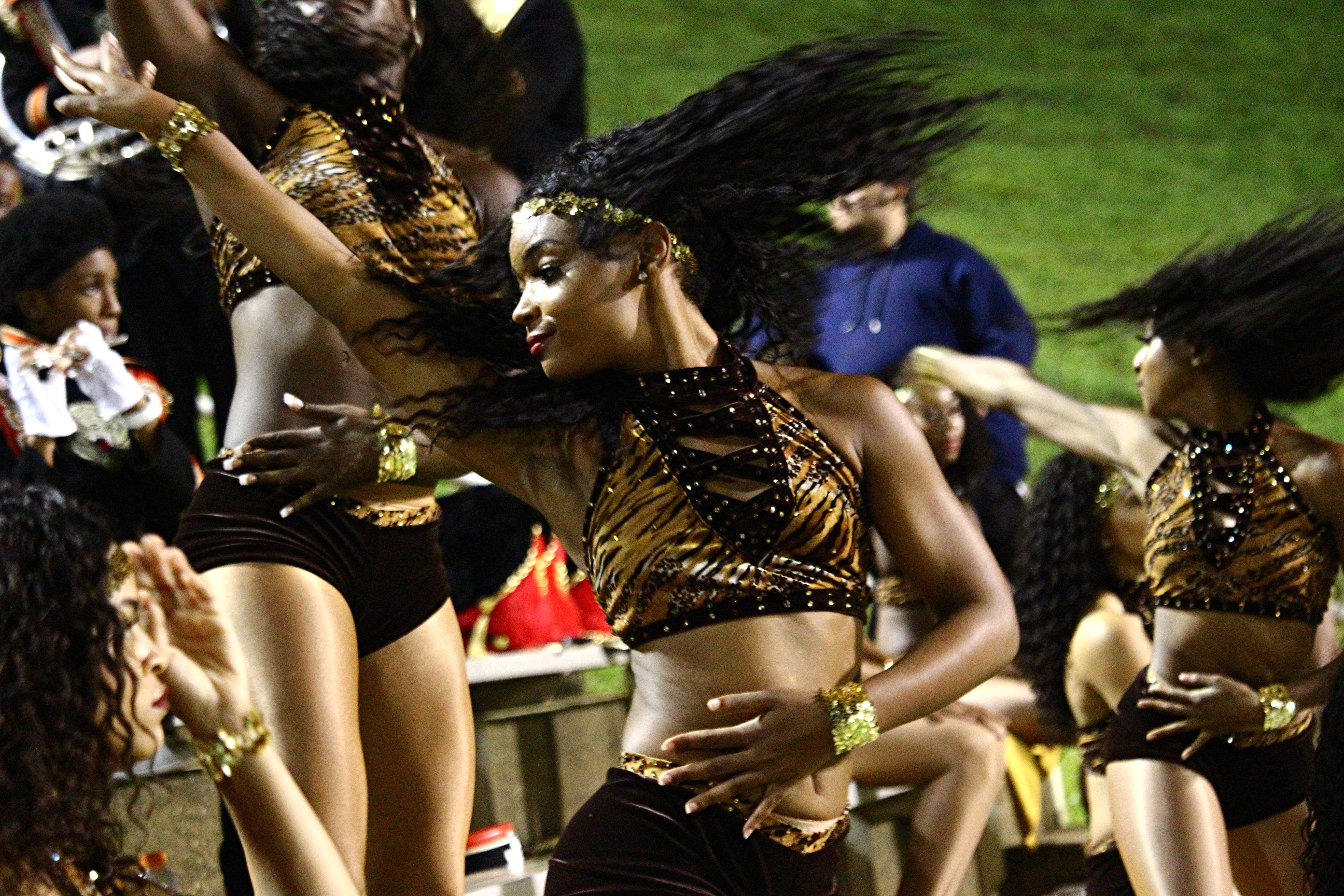
The Orchesis Dance Company

- In 1999, the band was featured in commercial bumpers for Cartoon Network's "Cartoon Cartoon Fridays" block. They performed the main Cartoon Cartoons theme, as well as the theme songs for other Cartoon Network shows.
- In 1998, the band was featured in Super Bowl XXXII, alongside Boyz II Men, Martha Reeves and Smokey Robinson.
- In 2001, the Tiger Marching Band was included in the inaugural parade for U.S. President George W. Bush.
- In 2002, GSU World Famed performed in the motion picture Drumline.
- The band recorded an album entitled "A Tribute To Motown" Motown Records (2005).
- In 2006, "Season of the Tiger," a six-part docudrama aired, following members of the Grambling State University (LA) marching band and football team during the 2005-2006 football season. Produced by DAFT films and Black Entertainment Television (BET), "Season of the Tiger" was the second BET reality show to focus on life at a historically black institution (HBCU), and the first to highlight the competitive environment of marching bands at some HBCUs.
- In 2007, the band performed in the award-winning Denzel Washington film, The Great Debators.
- In the 118th Tournament of Roses Parade (2007), Grambling State's marching band was the marching band in the Star Wars Spectacular, in which all members were wearing Imperial officer uniforms. This was the band's second time in the Tournament of Roses Parade: 1980 being the first time an HBCU band was selected to march and lead in the Tournament of Roses Parade.
- In 2009, GSU World Famed Tiger Marching Band was included in the inaugural parade for U.S. President Barack Obama.
- In 2010, the band's drumline, "Chocolate Thunder", performed at halftime in the NBA All-Star Game with Colombian singer Shakira.
- In 2013, the band was included in the second inaugural parade for U.S. President Barack Obama.
- In 2015, Drake mentioned the band in his hit song "Used to" featuring Lil' Wayne on his If You're Reading This It's Too Late mixtape.
- In 2016, Vice Media released a documentary covering the significance of GSU's marching band and the popularity of the annual battle against Southern University's Human Jukebox in the Mercedes-Benz Superdome.
- In 2019, select members from the band and Orchesis danceline were invited to perform for Beyonce and other guests at a private event in California during Coachella.
- In 2021, the Tiger Marching Band was one of the participants in the virtual inauguration event for U.S. President Joe Biden.
- In 2022, the band performed at halftime of the inaugural HBCU Legacy Bowl, the February 2022 edition.
- In 2023 it was announced Grambling's Orchesis Dance Company is featured in a docu-series on ESPN+ entitled "Why Not Us: Grambling Dance". The show shares the triumphs and challenges of the fall 2022 season with the band for the Orchesis Dance Company.
