= 1967 American Football League Championship Game =

Coordinates: 37.752°N 122.201°W

1967 AFL Championship Game
Houston Oilers (Eastern) (9–4–1)	Oakland Raiders (Western) (13–1)
7	40
Head coach: Wally Lemm	Head coach: John Rauch
	1	2	3	4	Total
HOU	0	0	0	7	7
OAK	3	14	10	13	40
- Date: December 31, 1967
- Stadium: Oakland-Alameda County Coliseum; Oakland, California
- Favorite: Oakland by 10 points
- Attendance: 53,330

TV in the United States
- Network: NBC
- Announcers: Curt Gowdy, Paul Christman

Location in the United States
Location in California

The 1967 AFL Championship Game was the eighth American Football League championship game, played on December 31 at Oakland-Alameda County Coliseum in Oakland, California.

It matched the Western Division champion Oakland Raiders (13–1) and the Eastern Division champion Houston Oilers (9–4–1) to decide the American Football League (AFL) champion for the 1967 season.

Quarterback Daryle Lamonica, traded from the Buffalo Bills in the offseason, led the Raiders to a 13–1 record, throwing 30 touchdown passes in the process. The Oilers went from last place in the East in 1966 (3–11) to first in 1967, beating out the New York Jets by a game. Most of the Oilers' offense centered on big fullback Hoyle Granger, and a midseason quarterback trade for the shifty Pete Beathard (sending their own starter, Jacky Lee, to the defending champion Kansas City Chiefs) proved to be the spark that turned Houston's season around.

The teams had met once in the regular season, three weeks earlier in Houston, with Oakland winning 19–7 to clinch the Western division title. This was Houston's fourth and final appearance (1960, 1961, 1962) in the title game and Oakland's first.

In contrast to the frigid conditions earlier in the day at the NFL championship game in Green Bay, the temperature for the AFL title game in northern California was 47 °F (8 °C). The host Raiders were ten-point favorites.

Oakland won 40–7 and shredded the Oilers with 364 yards of offense, including 263 yards rushing, while allowing just 146 total yards and 38 yards on the ground. The Raiders also forced three turnovers and lost none themselves.

The attendance of 53,330 was a new record for the AFL title game, passing the 42,080 of the previous year at Buffalo.

== Game summary ==
Shortly after 2 pm PST, Oakland's Dave Grayson returned the opening kickoff 47 yards, sparking a drive into scoring range, but it ended with no points when George Blanda missed a 38-yard field goal attempt. Houston then mounted their own drive into Raiders territory, but they also came up empty as a result of a fumble by tight end Alvin Reed on the Oakland 30-yard line that was forced and recovered by linebacker Dan Conners. Following a three-and-out for each team, Rodger Bird returned Jim Norton's 39-yard punt 9 yards to the Raiders 43-yard line, where they drove 28 yards to score on Blanda's 37-yard field goal with 3:06 left in the first quarter. Houston's next drive stalled on their own 44 and Norton had to punt again on the quarter's final play. Despite their 3–0 deficit, the Oilers seemed to be playing fairly well, having outgained Oakland in total yards, 93-52.

This quickly changed on the first play of the second quarter. Hewritt Dixon took a handoff from Lamonica, ran around the left end, and took off down the sidelines untouched for an AFL championship record 69-yard touchdown run, giving the Raiders a 10–0 lead. The rest of the game would be a desperate struggle for Houston's defense to keep the Raiders from adding more points, sometimes successful, but often not. Oakland defensive back Willie Brown intercepted a pass from Beathard on the Oilers next drive, though this only led to a missed 44-yard attempt by Blanda. After a punt, the Raiders drove to the Houston 36, but came up short again when Dixon was stuffed for no gain on 4th and 1. After another Norton punt, Oakland drove from their own 22-yard line to the Oilers 17. Faced with 4th and 1 again, the Raiders sent their field goal unit on to the field, but ran a fake field goal play with Lamonica (the holder on special teams) throwing a 17-yard touchdown pass to tight end Dave Kocourek. This gave Oakland a 17–0 lead with just 12 seconds left in the half.

Oakland completely took over the game in the second half. Houston defensive back Zeke Moore fumbled the opening kickoff when tackled by Duane Benson, and Ken Herock recovered the ball, returning it 6 yards to the Houston 29. Seven plays later, Lamonica made the score 24–0 with a 1-yard touchdown run. Then after a three-and-out, the Raiders drove 56 yards to go up 27-0 on Blanda's 40-yard field goal. The next Houston drive resulted in yet another three-and-out, and Norton's 33-yard punt gave Oakland the ball on their 46. Houston managed to force a punt of their own, but Mike Eischeid's 44-yard kick pinned them back at their own 2-yard line. The next drive resulted in more of the same, another three-and-out and another Norton punt, which Bird returned 19 yards to the Oilers 31-yard line. Oakland then scored on a 7-play drive that ended on a 40-yard Blanda field goal, putting the team up by a score of 30–0.

This time, Houston managed to respond, driving 78 yards in 5 plays to score on Beathard's 5-yard touchdown pass to Charley Frazier, cutting the score to 30–7. But by this point, less than 13 minutes remained in the game. Meanwhile, Oakland struck back with a 36-yard field goal, and later finished off the scoring with a 7-play, 48-yard drive that ended on Lamonica's 12-yard touchdown pass to Bill Miller.

Neither quarterback had a particularly good day. Beathard completed just 15 of 35 passes for 142 yards and a touchdown, with 1 interception. Frazier was the top receiver of the game with 7 receptions for 81 yards and a touchdown. Bobby Jancik returned 4 kickoffs for 100 yards. Lamonica finished the day with 10 completions in 24 attempts for 111 yards and two touchdowns, while also rushing for 22 yards and another score. Dixon rushed for 144 yards and a touchdown, and caught a pass for 8 yards. Banaszak rushed for 116 yards on just 15 carries, and caught a 4-yard pass. Blanda set an AFL championship record with four field goals on six attempts. Norton also had a busy day for Houston, punting 11 times for 423 yards.

=== Box score ===
Oakland Raiders 40, Houston Oilers 7

Quarter	1	2	3	4	Total
Oilers	0	0	0	7	7
Raiders	3	14	10	13	40

at Oakland-Alameda County Coliseum, Oakland, California

- Date: December 31, 1967
- Game time: 2:00 p.m. PST
- Game attendance: 53,330
- Referee: John McDonough
- TV announcers (NBC): Curt Gowdy, Paul Christman
- Pro-Football-Reference.com

Game information

Scoring

- First quarter
  - OAK – George Blanda 37-yard field goal. Raiders 3–0
- Second quarter
  - OAK – Hewritt Dixon 69-yard rush (George Blanda kick). Raiders 10–0
  - OAK – Dave Kocourek 17-yard pass from Daryle Lamonica (George Blanda kick). Raiders 17–0
- Third quarter
  - OAK – Daryle Lamonica 1-yard rush (George Blanda kick). Raiders 24–0
  - OAK – George Blanda 40-yard field goal. Raiders 27–0
- Fourth quarter
  - OAK – George Blanda 42-yard field goal. Raiders 30–0
  - HOU – Charley Frazier 5-yard pass from Pete Beathard (John Wittenborn kick). Raiders 30–7
  - OAK – George Blanda 36-yard field goal. Raiders 33–7
  - OAK – Bill Miller 12-yard pass from Daryle Lamonica (George Blanda kick). Raiders 40–7

Top passers

- HOU – Pete Beathard – 15/35, 142 yards, 1 TD, 1 INT
- OAK – Daryle Lamonica – 10/24, 111 yards, 2 TD

Top rushers

- HOU – Hoyle Granger – 14 rushes, 19 yards
- OAK – Hewritt Dixon – 21 rushes, 144 yards, 1 TD

Top receivers

- HOU – Charley Frazier – 7 receptions, 81 yards, 1 TD
- OAK – Bill Miller – 3 receptions, 32 yards, 1 TD

== Officials ==
- Referee: John McDonough
- Umpire: George Young
- Head linesman: Al Sabato
- Side linesman: Harry Kessel
- Back judge: Jack Reader
- Field judge: Frank Kirkland

The AFL added a sixth game official, the side linesman, in the previous season; the NFL added its sixth official, the line judge, in 1965. The seventh official, the side judge, was added in 1978.

== Statistics ==
Statistics	Oilers	Raiders
First Downs	11	18
Rushing yards	38	263
Yards per carry	1.7	5.4
Passing yards	142	111
Sacked-Yards	3–34	1–10
Passing yards	142	111
Total yards	146	364
Fumbles-Lost	4–2	0–0
Turnovers	3	0
Penalties-Yards	7–45	4–69

== Players' shares ==
The winning Raiders earned about $6,500 each, while the Oilers received about $5,000 each.

The upcoming Super Bowl II awarded an additional $15,000 per player for the winners and $7,500 each for the losing team.

== See also ==
- 1967 AFL season
- AFL Championship Games
- Super Bowl II
- 1967 NFL Championship Game

== Video ==
- Raiders.com - 1967 AFL Championship Game highlights

Preceded by Kansas City Chiefs; 1966 AFL Champions	Oakland Raiders; American Football League Champions; 1967	Succeeded by New York Jets; 1968 AFL Champions
