= 1967 All-AFL Team =

List of the best American Football League players of 1967

The 1967 American Football League All-League Team was selected after the 1967 American Football League season by the Associated Press (AP), the Newspaper Enterprise Association (NEA), the New York Daily News (NYDN), The Sporting News (TSN), and United Press International (UPI) to honor the league's top performers at each position.

== Teams ==
Offense
Position	First team	Second team
Quarterback	Daryle Lamonica, Raiders (AP, UPI, TSN); Joe Namath, Jets (NEA, NYDN)	Joe Namath, Jets (AP, UPI, TSN); Daryle Lamonica, Raiders (NEA, NYDN)
Halfback	Mike Garrett, Chiefs (AP, NEA, NYDN, UPI, TSN)	Dickie Post, Chargers (NEA, NYDN); Emerson Boozer, Jets (TSN)
Fullback	Jim Nance, Patriots (AP, NEA, NYDN, UPI); Hewritt Dixon, Raiders (TSN)	Hoyle Granger, Oilers (AP, NEA, UPI); Hewritt Dixon, Raiders (AP, NYDN, UPI); Jim Nance, Patriots (TSN)
Flanker	Lance Alworth, Chargers (AP, NEA, NYDN, UPI, TSN); George Sauer Jr., Jets (AP, NYDN, UPI, TSN); Al Denson, Broncos (NEA)	Don Maynard, Jets (AP, NEA, NYDN, UPI); Al Denson, Broncos (AP, NYDN, UPI, TSN); George Sauer Jr., Jets (NEA); Otis Taylor, Chiefs (TSN)
Tight end	Billy Cannon, Raiders (AP, UPI); Fred Arbanas, Chiefs (NEA, NYDN); Willie Frazier, Chargers (TSN)	Fred Arbanas, Chiefs (AP, UPI); Billy Cannon, Raiders (NYDN, TSN); Willie Frazier, Chargers (NEA)
Tackle	Ron Mix, Chargers (AP, NEA, NYDN, UPI); Jim Tyrer, Chiefs (AP, NYDN, TSN); Harry Schuh, Raiders (NEA, UPI); Walter Suggs, Oilers (TSN)	Walter Suggs, Oilers (AP, NEA, UPI); Harry Schuh, Raiders (AP, NYDN, TSN); Jim Tyrer, Chiefs (NEA, UPI); Sherman Plunkett, Jets (NYDN); Ron Mix, Chargers (TSN)
Guard	Walt Sweeney, Chargers (AP, NEA, NYDN, UPI); Bob Talamini, Oilers (AP, NEA, UPI, TSN); Dave Herman, Jets (NYDN); Gene Upshaw, Raiders (TSN)	Wayne Hawkins, Raiders (AP, NYDN, UPI, TSN); Ed Budde, Chiefs (AP, NEA, NYDN); Gene Upshaw, Raiders (NEA, UPI); Walt Sweeney, Chargers (TSN)
Center	Jim Otto, Raiders (AP, NEA, NYDN, UPI, TSN)	Jon Morris, Patriots (AP, NYDN, UPI); Bobby Maples, Oilers (NEA, TSN)

Special teams
Position	First team	Second team
Kicker	George Blanda, Raiders (TSN)	Jan Stenerud, Chiefs (TSN)
Punter	Bob Scarpitto, Broncos (TSN)	Paul Maguire, Bills (TSN)

Defense
Position	First team	Second team
Defensive end	Ben Davidson, Raiders (AP, NYDN, UPI, TSN); Pat Holmes, Oilers (AP, NEA, UPI); Ron McDole, Bills (NEA); Gerry Philbin, Jets (NYDN); Jerry Mays, Chiefs (TSN)	Jerry Mays, Chiefs (AP, NYDN); Ron McDole, Bills (AP, UPI); Verlon Biggs, Jets (NEA, TSN); Pat Holmes, Oilers (NYDN, TSN); Ben Davidson, Raiders (NEA) Gerry Philbin, Jets (UPI)
Defensive tackle	Buck Buchanan, Chiefs (AP, NEA, NYDN, UPI, TSN); Tom Keating, Raiders (AP, NEA, UPI, TSN); Houston Antwine, Patriots (NYDN)	Dave Costa, Broncos (AP, NEA, NYDN, UPI); Houston Antwine, Patriots (AP, UPI, TSN); Jim Lee Hunt, Patriots (NEA, TSN); Tom Keating, Raiders (NYDN)
Middle linebacker	Nick Buoniconti, Boston (AP, NYDN, UPI, TSN); Dan Conners, Raiders (NEA)	Dan Conners, Raiders (AP, NYDN, UPI, TSN); Nick Buoniconti, Boston (NEA)
Outside linebacker	George Webster, Oilers (AP, NEA, NYDN, UPI, TSN); Bobby Bell, Chiefs (AP, NYDN, TSN); Mike Stratton, Bills (NEA)	Mike Stratton, Bills (AP, NYDN, TSN); Larry Grantham, Jets (AP, NYDN); Gus Otto, Raiders (UPI, TSN); Bobby Bell, Chiefs (NEA); Bill Laskey, Raiders (NEA); Frank Buncom, Chargers (UPI)
Cornerback	Miller Farr, Oilers (AP, NEA, NYDN, UPI, TSN); Kent McCloughan, Raiders (AP, NEA, NYDN, UPI, TSN)	Willie Brown, Raiders (AP, NYDN, UPI, TSN); Speedy Duncan, Chargers (AP, NEA, NYDN, TSN); Dick Westmoreland, Dolphins (NEA, UPI); Jimmy Warren, Dolphins (TSN)
Safety	George Saimes, Bills (AP, NEA, NYDN, UPI, TSN); Johnny Robinson, Chiefs (AP, NEA, NYDN, UPI); Kenny Graham, Chargers (TSN)	Jim Norton, Oilers (AP, NYDN, UPI); Rodger Bird, Raiders (AP, NYDN); Kenny Graham, Chargers (NEA, UPI); Don Webb, Patriots (NEA); Johnny Robinson Chiefs (TSN)
