= 1967 San Diego Chargers season =

NFL team season

- Owner: Eugene V. Klein
- General manager: Sid Gillman
- Head coach: Sid Gillman
- Home stadium: San Diego Stadium

Results
- Record: 8–5–1
- Division place: 3rd Western Division
- Playoffs: Did not qualify
- All-AFL: 4: FL Lance Alworth (1st team); CB/KR Speedy Duncan (2nd team); T Ron Mix (1st team); G Walt Sweeney (1st team)
- AFL All-Stars: 10: FL Lance Alworth; LB Frank Buncom; CB/KR Speedy Duncan; TE Willie Frazier; S Kenny Graham; RB Brad Hubbert; T Ron Mix; RB Dickie Post; LB Rick Redman; G Walt Sweeney

The 1967 season was the 8th season for the San Diego Chargers as a professional AFL franchise; the team improved on their 7–6–1 record in 1966 and finishing at 8–5–1. It was the team's first season at San Diego Stadium. The Chargers finished in third place in the AFL West Division with a record of 8–5–1.

== NFL / AFL draft ==
1967 San Diego Chargers draft
Round	Pick	Player	Position	College	Notes
1	14	Ron Billingsley	Defensive tackle	Wyoming	
2	40	Ron McCall	Linebacker	Weber State	
2	48	Bob Howard	Cornerback	San Diego State	
3	67	Harold Akin	Tackle	Oklahoma State	
4	94	Dickie Post *	Running back	Houston	
5	121	Bernie Erickson	Linebacker	Abilene Christian	
6	147	Nate Johns	Flanker	San Diego State	
7	173	Dave Conway	Kicker	Texas	
8	199	John Mills	End	Tennessee	
9	225	Steve Newell	Wide receiver	Long Beach State	
10	251	Torre Ossmo	Tackle	Western Michigan	
11	277	Carroll Jarvis	Halfback	Virginia	
13	329	Leon Carr	Defensive back	Prairie View A&M	
14	355	Martin Baccaglio	Defensive end	San Jose State	
15	381	Craig Scoggins	End	Long Beach State	
16	407	Paul Phillips	Tackle	South Carolina	
17	433	John Gibbs	Halfback	South Carolina State Bulldogs football	
Made roster * Made at least one AFL All-Star game or NFL Pro Bowl during career

== Roster ==
1967 San Diego Chargers roster
Quarterbacks (QB): 21 John Hadl; 18 Kay Stephenson; Running backs (RB): 32 Jim Allison; 37 Gene Foster; 26 Brad Hubbert; 23 Paul Lowe; 22 Dickie Post; 20 Russ Smith; Wide receivers (WR): 19 Lance Alworth; 27 Gary Garrison; 25 Steve Newell; Tight ends (TE): 83 Willie Frazier; 38 Jacque MacKinnon	Offensive linemen (OL): 71 Harold Akin T; 65 Sam Gruneisen C; 72 Gary Kirner G; 52 Paul Latzke G/C; 73 Larry Little G; 74 Ron Mix T; 76 Terry Owens T; 78 Walt Sweeney G; 75 Ernie Wright T; Defensive linemen (DL): 70 Scott Appleton DT; 86 Ron Billingsley DE; 88 Tom Day DE; 82 Steve DeLong DE; 77 Jim Griffin DE; 79 George Gross DT; 80 Houston Ridge DT	Linebackers (LB): 50 Chuck Allen MLB; 84 Johnny Baker OLB; 55 Frank Buncom OLB; 62 Bernie Erickson OLB; 89 Ron McCall OLB; 57 Bob Print OLB; 66 Rick Redman MLB/P; 81 Jeff Staggs OLB; Defensive backs (DB): 40 Joe Beauchamp CB; 45 Speedy Duncan CB; 33 Kenny Graham SS; 24 Bob Howard CB; 36 Frank Marsh FS; 43 Jim Tolbert SS; 47 Bud Whitehead FS; Special teams (ST): 44 Olie Cordill P; 39 Dick Van Raaphorst K	Practice squad: -- Bobby Asmond G; 68 Bob Briggs DE; 15 Jon Brittenum QB; Reserve: -- Robert Mitinger LB (Military); 41 Nat Whitmyer CB (IR); Rookies in italics

== Preseason ==
Week	Date	Opponent	Result	Record	Venue	Attendance
1	August 5	at Oakland Raiders	L 23–24	0–1	Oakland–Alameda County Coliseum	
2	August 12	at Miami Dolphins	W 20–14	1–1	Orange Bowl	
3	August 20	Detroit Lions	L 17–38	1–2	San Diego Stadium	
4	August 27	Los Angeles Rams	L 7–50	1–3	San Diego Stadium	
5	September 2	Pittsburgh Steelers	L 7–16	1–4	San Diego Stadium	

== Regular season ==
=== Schedule ===
Week	Date	Opponent	Result	Record	Venue	Attendance	Recap
1	Bye						
2	September 9	Boston Patriots	**W** 28–14	1–0	San Diego Stadium	39,337	Recap
3	Bye						
4	September 24	Houston Oilers	**W** 13–3	2–0	San Diego Stadium	36,032	Recap
5	October 1	at Buffalo Bills	**W** 37–17	3–0	War Memorial Stadium	39,310	Recap
6	October 8	Boston Patriots*	**T** 31–31	3–0–1	San Diego Stadium	23,620	Recap
7	October 15	**Kansas City Chiefs**	**W** 45–31	4–0–1	San Diego Stadium	45,355	Recap
8	October 22	at **Denver Broncos**	**W** 38–21	5–0–1	Bears Stadium	34,465	Recap
9	October 29	at **Oakland Raiders**	**L** 10–51	5–1–1	Oakland–Alameda County Coliseum	53,474	Recap
10	Bye						
11	November 12	Miami Dolphins	**W** 24–0	6–1–1	San Diego Stadium	34,761	Recap
12	November 19	at **Kansas City Chiefs**	**W** 17–16	7–1–1	Municipal Stadium	46,738	Recap
13	November 23	**Denver Broncos**	**W** 24–20	8–1–1	San Diego Stadium	34,586	Recap
14	December 3	**Oakland Raiders**	**L** 21–41	8–2–1	San Diego Stadium	52,661	Recap
15	December 10	at Miami Dolphins	**L** 24–41	8–3–1	Miami Orange Bowl	23,007	Recap
16	December 16	at Houston Oilers	**L** 17–24	8–4–1	Rice Stadium	19,870	Recap
17	December 24	New York Jets	**L** 31–42	8–5–1	San Diego Stadium	34,580	Recap
Note: Intra-division opponents are in **bold** text.

*Played at San Diego Stadium due to Fenway Park being used by the Boston Red Sox for the 1967 World Series.

=== Game summaries ===
==== Week 2: vs. Boston Patriots ====
Week Two: Boston Patriots at San Diego Chargers – Game summary

Quarter	1	2	3	4	Total
Patriots	7	7	0	0	**14**
**Chargers**	7	7	0	14	**28**

at San Diego Stadium, San Diego, California

- Date: September 9
- Game time: 8:00 p.m. PDT
- Game weather: 70 °F (21.1 °C), relative humidity 74%, wind 9 mph
- Game attendance: 39,337
- Referee: Walt Fitzgerald
- Box score

Game information

**First quarter**

- SDG – Paul Lowe 7-yard run (Dick Van Raaphorst kick), 9:33. Chargers 7–0. **Drive: 4 plays, 78 yards.**
- BOS – Jim Whalen 30-yard pass from Babe Parilli (Gino Cappelletti kick), 4:04. Tied 7–7. **Drive: 7 plays, 84 yards.**

**Second quarter**

- BOS – Art Graham 4-yard pass from Babe Parilli (Gino Cappelletti kick), 13:37. Patriots 14–7. **Drive: 8 plays, 66 yards.**
- SDG – Willie Frazier 28-yard pass from John Hadl (Dick Van Raaphorst kick), 0:45. Tied 14–14. **Drive: 4 plays, 76 yards.**

**Third quarter**

- No scoring plays.

**Fourth quarter**

- SDG – Willie Frazier 11-yard pass from John Hadl (Dick Van Raaphorst kick), 6:57. Chargers 21–14. **Drive: 5 plays, 30 yards.**
- SDG – Kenny Graham 68-yard interception return (Dick Van Raaphorst kick), 2:22. Chargers 28–14.

**Top passers**

- BOS – Babe Parilli – 17/32, 187 yards, 2 TD, 2 INT
- SDG – John Hadl – 15/29, 242 yards, 2 TD, INT

**Top rushers**

- BOS – Jim Nance – 18 rushes, 61 yards
- SDG – John Hadl – 4 rushes, 28 yards

**Top receivers**

- BOS – Art Graham – 9 receptions, 116 yards, TD
- SDG – Willie Frazier – 5 receptions, 105 yards, 2 TD

==== Week 4: vs. Houston Oilers ====
Week Four: Houston Oilers at San Diego Chargers – Game summary

Quarter	1	2	3	4	Total
Oilers	0	3	0	0	**3**
**Chargers**	3	3	0	7	**13**

at San Diego Stadium, San Diego, California

- Date: September 24
- Game weather: 69 °F (20.6 °C), relative humidity 70%, wind 6 mph
- Game attendance: 36,032
- Box score

Game information

**First quarter**

- SDG – Dick Van Raaphorst 14-yard field goal Chargers 3–0.

**Second quarter**

- HOU – John Wittenborn 31-yard field goal. Tied 3–3.
- SDG – Dick Van Raaphorst 42-yard field goal. Chargers 6–3.

**Third quarter**

- No scoring plays.

**Fourth quarter**

- SDG – Lance Alworth 44-yard pass from John Hadl (Dick Van Raaphorst kick). Chargers 13–3.

**Top passers**

- HOU – Jacky Lee – 8/20, 77 yards
- SDG – John Hadl – 20/39, 213 yards, TD, INT

**Top rushers**

- HOU – Sid Blanks – 13 rushes, 35 yards
- SDG – Dickie Post – 17 rushes, 57 yards

**Top receivers**

- HOU – Charley Frazier – 3 receptions, 31 yards
- SDG – Lance Alworth – 10 receptions, 121 yards

==== Week 5: at Buffalo Bills ====
Week Five: San Diego Chargers at Buffalo Bills – Game summary

Quarter	1	2	3	4	Total
**Chargers**	7	14	13	3	**37**
Bills	3	0	7	7	**17**

at War Memorial Stadium, Buffalo, New York

- Date: October 1
- Game time: 2:00 p.m. EDT
- Game weather: 49 °F (9.4 °C), relative humidity 79%, wind 11 mph
- Game attendance: 39,310
- Box score

Game information

**First quarter**

- BUF – Mike Mercer 26-yard field goal, 12:38. Bills 3–0. **Drive: 5 plays, 15 yards.**
- SDG – Dickie Post 1-yard run (Dick Van Raaphorst kick), 2:10. Chargers 7–3. **Drive: 9 plays, 83 yards.**

**Second quarter**

- SDG – Willie Frazier 21-yard pass from John Hadl (Dick Van Raaphorst kick), 9:34. Chargers 14–3. **Drive: 8 plays, 81 yards.**
- SDG – Jacque MacKinnon 3-yard pass from John Hadl (Dick Van Raaphorst kick), 2:14. Chargers 21–3. **Drive: 9 plays, 75 yards.**

**Third quarter**

- SDG – Dick Van Raaphorst 32-yard field goal, 8:59. Chargers 24–3. **Drive: 11 plays, 48 yards.**
- SDG – Dick Van Raaphorst 30-yard field goal, 4:40. Chargers 27–3. **Drive: 7 plays, 25 yards.**
- SDG – Scott Appleton 2-yard fumble return (Dick Van Raaphorst kick), 2:12. Chargers 34–3.
- BUF – Keith Lincoln 60-yard pass from Jack Kemp (Mike Mercer kick), 0:05. Chargers 34–10. **Drive: 4 plays, 80 yards.**

**Fourth quarter**

- SDG – Dick Van Raaphorst 25-yard field goal, 1:05. Chargers 37–10. **Drive: 11 plays, 44 yards.**
- BUF – Keith Lincoln 10-yard run (Mike Mercer kick), 0:01. Chargers 37–17. **Drive: 7 plays, 71 yards.**

**Top passers**

- SDG – John Hadl – 18/31, 282 yards, 2 TD
- BUF – Jack Kemp – 7/18, 198 yards, TD, INT

**Top rushers**

- SDG – Dickie Post – 20 rushes, 121 yards, TD
- BUF – Keith Lincoln – 8 rushes, 34 yards, TD

**Top receivers**

- SDG – Willie Frazier – 5 receptions, 106 yards, TD
- BUF – Keith Lincoln – 3 receptions, 90 yards, TD

==== Week 6: vs. Boston ====
Week Six: Boston Patriots at San Diego Chargers – Game summary

Quarter	1	2	3	4	Total
Patriots	7	14	10	0	**31**
Chargers	7	10	0	14	**31**

at San Diego Stadium, San Diego, California

- Date: October 8
- Game time: 4:00 p.m. PDT
- Game weather: 72 °F (22.2 °C), relative humidity 28%, wind 6 mph
- Game attendance: 23,620
- Referee: Ben Dreith
- Box score

Game information

**First quarter**

- SDG – Brad Hubbert 20-yard pass from John Hadl (Dick Van Raaphorst kick), 5:38. Chargers 7–0. **Drive: 2 plays, 20 yards.**
- BOS – Larry Garron 64-yard pass from Babe Parilli (Gino Cappelletti kick), 3:40. Tied 7–7.

**Second quarter**

- SDG – John Hadl 1-yard run (Dick Van Raaphorst kick), 11:54. Chargers 14–7. **Drive: 5 plays, 57 yards.**
- BOS – Jim Nance 1-yard run (Gino Cappelletti kick), 3:07. Tied 14–14. **Drive: 8 plays, 61 yards.**
- SDG – Dick Van Raaphorst 32-yard field goal, 1:35. Chargers 17–14. **Drive: 5 plays, 56 yards.**
- BOS – Jim Nance 18-yard run (Gino Cappelletti kick), 0:40. Patriots 21–17. **Drive: 6 plays, 43 yards.**

**Third quarter**

- BOS – Art Graham 8-yard pass from Babe Parilli (Gino Cappelletti kick), 3:24. Patriots 28–17. **Drive: 4 plays, 44 yards.**
- BOS – Gino Cappelletti 41-yard field goal, 0:05. Patriots 31–17. **Drive: 4 plays, -1 yards.**

**Fourth quarter**

- SDG – Willie Frazier 4-yard pass from John Hadl (Dick Van Raaphorst kick), 10:19. Patriots 31–24. **Drive: 3 plays, 25 yards.**
- SDG – Lance Alworth 24-yard pass from John Hadl (Dick Van Raaphorst kick), 7:00. Tied 31–31. **Drive: 7 plays, 48 yards.**

**Top passers**

- BOS – Babe Parilli – 17/34, 264 yards, 2 TD, INT
- SDG – John Hadl – 17/29, 249 yards, 3 TD

**Top rushers**

- BOS – Jim Nance – 29 rushes, 127 yards, TD
- SDG – Brad Hubbert – 9 rushes, 39 yards

**Top receivers**

- BOS – Larry Garron – 5 receptions, 96 yards, TD
- SDG – Brad Hubbert – 2 receptions, 69 yards, TD

==== Week 7: vs. Kansas City Chiefs ====
Week Seven: Kansas City Chiefs at San Diego Chargers – Game summary

Quarter	1	2	3	4	Total
**Chargers**	7	7	3	14	**31**
Chiefs	14	10	14	7	**45**

at San Diego Stadium, San Diego, California

- Date: October 15
- Game time: 1:34 p.m. PDT
- Game weather: 68 °F (20.0 °C), relative humidity 77%, wind 9 mph
- Game attendance: 45,355
- Referee: Bob Finley
- Box score

Game information

**First quarter**

- SDG – John Hadl 1-yard run (Dick Van Raaphorst kick), 8:17. Chargers 7–0. **Drive: 11 plays, 76 yards.**
- SDG – Speedy Duncan 35-yard fumble return (Dick Van Raaphorst kick), 1:07. Chargers 14–0.
- KAN – Otis Taylor 24-yard run (Jan Stenerud kick), 0:30. Chargers 14–7. **Drive: 4 plays, 66 yards.**

**Second quarter**

- SDG – Dick Van Raaphorst 15-yard field goal, 8:52. Chargers 17–7. **Drive: 11 plays, 66 yards.**
- SDG – Speedy Duncan 100-yard interception return (Dick Van Raaphorst kick), 6:08. Chargers 24–7.
- KAN – Mike Garrett 1-yard run (Jan Stenerud kick), 1:52. Chargers 24–14. **Drive: 7 plays, 54 yards.**

**Third quarter**

- SDG – Dickie Post 67-yard run (Dick Van Raaphorst kick), 12:30. Chargers 31–14. **Drive: 1 play, 67 yards.**
- KAN – Jan Stenerud 34-yard field goal, 7:16. Chargers 31–17. **Drive: 10 plays, 59 yards.**
- SDG – Lance Alworth 60-yard pass from John Hadl (Dick Van Raaphorst kick), 6:56. Chargers 38–17. **Drive: 1 play, 60 yards.**

**Fourth quarter**

- SDG – Lance Alworth 5-yard pass from John Hadl (Dick Van Raaphorst kick), 6:45. Chargers 45–17. **Drive: 2 plays, 4 yards.**
- KAN – Chris Burford 16-yard pass from Len Dawson (Jan Stenerud kick), 4:58. Chargers 45–24. **Drive: 5 plays, 67 yards.**
- KAN – Frank Pitts 15-yard run (Jan Stenerud kick), 1:44. Chargers 45–31. **Drive: 5 plays, 39 yards.**

**Top passers**

- KAN – Len Dawson – 24/37, 364 yards, TD, 3 INT
- SDG – John Hadl – 17/32, 307 yards, 2 TD, INT

**Top rushers**

- KAN – Mike Garrett – 11 rushes, 33 yards, TD
- SDG – Dickie Post – 15 rushes, 116 yards, TD

**Top receivers**

- KAN – Otis Taylor – 9 receptions, 134 yards
- SDG – Gary Garrison – 4 receptions, 108 yards

==== Week 8: at Denver Broncos ====
Week Eight: San Diego Chargers at Denver Broncos – Game summary

Quarter	1	2	3	4	Total
**Chargers**	7	7	14	10	**38**
Broncos	7	0	7	7	**21**

at Bears Stadium, Denver, Colorado

- Date: October 22
- Game weather: 55 °F (12.8 °C), relative humidity 25%, wind 9 mph
- Game attendance: 34,465
- Box score

Game information

**First quarter**

- DEN – Nemiah Wilson 40-yard interception return (Bob Humphreys kick), 12:38. Bills 3–0. **Drive: 5 plays, 15 yards.**
- SDG – Dickie Post 8-yard run (Dick Van Raaphorst kick), 2:10. Chargers 7–3. **Drive: 9 plays, 83 yards.**

**Second quarter**

- SDG – Dickie Post 2-yard run (Dick Van Raaphorst kick), 2:10. Chargers 7–3. **Drive: 9 plays, 83 yards.**

**Third quarter**

- DEN – Eric Crabtree 75-yard pass from Steve Tensi (Bob Humphreys kick), 0:05. Chargers 34–10. **Drive: 4 plays, 80 yards.**
- SDG – Dickie Post 66-yard pass from John Hadl (Dick Van Raaphorst kick), 8:59. Chargers 24–3. **Drive: 11 plays, 48 yards.**
- SDG – Willie Frazier 5-yard pass from John Hadl (Dick Van Raaphorst kick), 9:34. Chargers 14–3. **Drive: 8 plays, 81 yards.**

**Fourth quarter**

- DEN – Al Denson 10-yard pass from Steve Tensi (Bob Humphreys kick), 0:01. Chargers 37–17. **Drive: 7 plays, 71 yards.**
- SDG – Lance Alworth 67-yard pass from John Hadl (Dick Van Raaphorst kick), 1:05. Chargers 37–10. **Drive: 11 plays, 44 yards.**
- SDG – Dick Van Raaphorst 30-yard field goal, 1:05. Chargers 37–10. **Drive: 11 plays, 44 yards.**

**Top passers**

- SDG – John Hadl – 15/34, 345 yards, 3 TD, 2 INT
- DEN – Steve Tensi – 15/36, 234 yards, 2 TD

**Top rushers**

- SDG – Dickie Post – 15 rushes, 70 yards, 2 TD
- DEN – Floyd Little – 9 rushes, 30 yards

**Top receivers**

- SDG – Lance Alworth – 5 receptions, 142 yards, TD
- DEN – Eric Crabtree – 6 receptions, 123 yards, TD

==== Week 9: at Oakland Raiders ====
Week Nine: San Diego Chargers at Oakland Raiders – Game summary

Quarter	1	2	3	4	Total
Chargers	0	10	0	0	**10**
**Raiders**	9	7	14	21	**51**

at Oakland-Alameda County Coliseum, Oakland, California

- Date: October 29
- Game weather: 60 °F (15.6 °C), relative humidity 58%, wind 7 mph
- Game attendance: 53,474
- Box score

Game information

**First quarter**

- OAK – Safety, Dan Birdwell tackled Dickie Post in end zone, 8:31. Raiders 2–0.
- OAK – Clem Daniels 40-yard pass from Daryle Lamonica (George Blanda kick), 2:58. Raiders 9–0. **Drive: 6 plays, 49 yards.**

**Second quarter**

- SDG – Dick Van Raaphorst 40-yard field goal, 14:55. Raiders 9–3. **Drive: 8 plays, 49 yards.**
- OAK – Daryle Lamonica 3-yard run (George Blanda kick), 4:39. Raiders 16–3. **Drive: 3 plays, 10 yards.**
- SDG – Lance Alworth 71-yard pass from John Hadl (Dick Van Raaphorst kick), 4:03. Raiders 16–10. **Drive: 1 play, 71 yards.**

**Third quarter**

- OAK – Clem Daniels 1-yard run (George Blanda kick), 10:52. Raiders 23–10. **Drive: 8 plays, 69 yards.**
- OAK – Daryle Lamonica 1-yard rush (George Blanda kick), 3:28. Raiders 30–10. **Drive: 3 plays, 28 yards.**

**Fourth quarter**

- OAK – Fred Biletnikoff 70-yard pass from Daryle Lamonica (George Blanda kick), 14:16. Raiders 37–10. **Drive: 5 plays, 87 yards.**
- OAK – Warren Wells 14-yard pass from George Blanda (George Blanda kick), 4:33. Raiders 44–10. **Drive: 1 play, 14 yards.**
- OAK – Hewritt Dixon 7-yard run (George Blanda kick), 2:34. Raiders 51–10. **Drive: 2 plays, 10 yards.**

**Top passers**

- SDG – John Hadl – 19/39, 318 yards, TD, 3 INT
- OAK – Daryle Lamonica – 13/30, 316 yards, 2 TD, INT

**Top rushers**

- SDG – Paul Lowe – 6 rushes, 29 yards
- OAK – Clem Daniels – 16 rushes, 94 yards, TD

**Top receivers**

- SDG – Lance Alworth – 10 receptions, 213 yards, TD
- OAK – Clem Daniels – 4 receptions, 101 yards, TD

==== Week 11: vs. Miami Dolphins ====
Week Eleven: Miami Dolphins at San Diego Chargers – Game summary

Quarter	1	2	3	4	Total
Dolphins	0	0	0	0	**0**
**Chargers**	7	0	0	17	**24**

at San Diego Stadium, San Diego, California

- Date: November 12
- Game time: 1:35 p.m. PST
- Game weather: 65 °F (18.3 °C), relative humidity 79%, wind 6 mph
- Game attendance: 34,761
- Referee: John McDonough
- Box score

Game information

**First quarter**

- SDG – Willie Frazier 9-yard pass from John Hadl (Dick Van Raaphorst kick), 6:16. Chargers 7–0. **Drive: 8 plays, 66 yards.**

**Second quarter**

- No scoring plays.

**Third quarter**

- No scoring plays.

**Fourth quarter**

- SDG – Gary Garrison 10-yard pass from John Hadl (Dick Van Raaphorst kick), 10:08. Chargers 14–0. **Drive: 3 plays, 55 yards.**
- SDG – Dick Van Raaphorst 32-yard field goal, 5:23. Chargers 17–0. **Drive: 8 plays, 47 yards.**
- SDG – Lance Alworth 5-yard pass from Kay Stephenson (Dick Van Raaphorst kick), 0:28. Chargers 24–0. **Drive: 8 plays, 55 yards.**

**Top passers**

- MIA – Bob Griese – 13/39, 186 yards
- SDG – John Hadl – 14/27, 216 yards, 2 TD, 4 INT

**Top rushers**

- MIA – Bob Griese – 6 rushes, 36 yards
- SDG – Dickie Post – 14 rushes, 48 yards

**Top receivers**

- MIA – Jack Clancy – 5 receptions, 71 yards
- SDG – Lance Alworth – 4 receptions, 125 yards, TD

==== Week 12: at Kansas City Chiefs ====
Week Twelve: San Diego Chargers at Kansas City Chiefs – Game summary

Quarter	1	2	3	4	Total
Chiefs	7	3	0	7	**17**
**Chargers**	6	3	7	0	**16**

at Municipal Stadium, Kansas City, Missouri

- Date: November 19
- Game time: 3:36 p.m. CST
- Game weather: 42 °F (5.6 °C), relative humidity 57%, wind 7 mph
- Game attendance: 46,738
- Box score

Game information

**First quarter**

- KAN – Jan Stenerud 12-yard field goal, 8:44. Chiefs 3–0. **Drive: 4 plays, 3 yards.**
- KAN – Jan Stenerud 48-yard field goal, 4:00. Chiefs 6–0. **Drive: 8 plays, 16 yards.**
- SDG – Dickie Post 4-yard run (Dick Van Raaphorst kick), 1:03. Chargers 7–6. **Drive: 4 plays, 73 yards.**

**Second quarter**

- SDG – Dick Van Raaphorst 12-yard field goal, 8:57. Chargers 10–6. **Drive: 11 plays, 73 yards.**
- KAN – Jan Stenerud 48-yard field goal, 0:26. Chargers 10–9. **Drive: 4 plays, 11 yards.**

**Third quarter**

- KAN – Gloster Richardson 35-yard pass from Len Dawson (Jan Stenerud kick), 1:44. Chiefs 16–10. **Drive: 4 plays, 69 yards.**

**Fourth quarter**

- SDG – Lance Alworth 2-yard pass from John Hadl (Dick Van Raaphorst kick), 8:31. Chargers 17–16. **Drive: 13 plays, 80 yards.**

**Top passers**

- SDG – John Hadl – 11/23, 139 yards, TD, INT
- KAN – Len Dawson – 18/31, 232 yards, TD

**Top rushers**

- SDG – Dickie Post – 18 rushes, 108 yards, TD
- KAN – Mike Garrett – 26 rushes, 83 yards

**Top receivers**

- SDG – Gary Garrison – 4 receptions, 69 yards
- KAN – Gloster Richardson – 4 receptions, 79 yards, TD

==== Week 13: vs. Denver Broncos ====
Week Thirteen: Denver Broncos at San Diego Chargers – Game summary

Quarter	1	2	3	4	Total
Broncos	7	10	3	0	**20**
**Chargers**	0	7	3	14	**24**

at San Diego Stadium, San Diego, California

- Date: November 23
- Game time: 1:34 p.m. PST
- Game weather: 62 °F (16.7 °C), relative humidity 81%, wind 5 mph
- Game attendance: 34,586
- Referee: John McDonough
- Box score

Game information

**First quarter**

- DEN – Al Denson 9-yard pass from Steve Tensi (Bob Humphreys kick), 4:01. Broncos 7–0. **Drive: 9 plays, 65 yards.**

**Second quarter**

- DEN – Eric Crabtree 5-yard pass from Steve Tensi (Bob Humphreys kick), 14:52. Broncos 14–0. **Drive: 7 plays, 63 yards.**
- SDG – Dickie Post 7-yard run (Dick Van Raaphorst kick), 10:01. Broncos 14–7. **Drive: 3 plays, 22 yards.**
- DEN – Bob Humphreys 13-yard field goal, 4:51. Broncos 17–7. **Drive: 14 plays, 74 yards.**

**Third quarter**

- SDG – Dick Van Raaphorst 24-yard field goal, 10:16. Broncos 17–10. **Drive: 11 plays, 59 yards.**
- DEN – Bob Humphreys 16-yard field goal, 5:51. Broncos 20–10. **Drive: 8 plays, 51 yards.**

**Fourth quarter**

- SDG – Speedy Duncan 72-yard blocked field goal return (Dick Van Raaphorst kick), 13:48. Broncos 20–17.
- SDG – Dickie Post 8-yard run (Dick Van Raaphorst kick), 2:33. Chargers 24–20. **Drive: 3 plays, 24 yards.**

**Top passers**

- DEN – Steve Tensi – 18/41, 253 yards, 2 TD, 2 INT
- SDG – John Hadl – 13/26, 202 yards, INT

**Top rushers**

- DEN – Floyd Little – 22 rushes, 79 yards
- SDG – Dickie Post – 21 rushes, 77 yards, 2 TD

**Top receivers**

- DEN – Eric Crabtree – 8 receptions, 107 yards, TD
- SDG – Gary Garrison – 4 receptions, 119 yards

==== Week 14: vs. Oakland Raiders ====
Week Fourteen: Oakland Raiders at San Diego Chargers – Game summary

Quarter	1	2	3	4	Total
**Raiders**	17	14	7	3	**41**
Chargers	7	14	0	0	**21**

at San Diego Stadium, San Diego, California

- Date: December 3
- Game time: 1:38 p.m. PST
- Game weather: 56 °F (13.3 °C), relative humidity 46%, wind 6 mph
- Game attendance: 52,661
- Referee: Bob Finley
- Box score

Game information

**First quarter**

- OAK – Fred Biletnikoff 18-yard pass from Daryle Lamonica (George Blanda kick), 9:24. Raiders 7–0. **Drive: 5 plays, 75 yards.**
- SDG – John Hadl 1-yard run (Dick Van Raaphorst kick), 6:34. Tied 7–7. **Drive: 6 plays, 80 yards.**
- OAK – Billy Cannon 64-yard pass from Daryle Lamonica (George Blanda kick), 5:14. Raiders 14–7. **Drive: 3 plays, 74 yards.**
- OAK – George Blanda 24-yard field goal, 1:28. Raiders 17–7. **Drive: 6 plays, 11 yards.**

**Second quarter**

- SDG – Lance Alworth 57-yard pass from John Hadl (Dick Van Raaphorst kick), 13:52. Raiders 17–14. **Drive: 5 plays, 80 yards.**
- OAK – Bill Miller 29-yard pass from Daryle Lamonica (George Blanda kick), 6:47. Raiders 24–14. **Drive: 7 plays, 59 yards.**
- OAK – Larry Todd 2-yard run (George Blanda kick), 4:02. Raiders 31–14. **Drive: 5 plays, 45 yards.**
- SDG – Gary Garrison 29-yard pass from John Hadl (Dick Van Raaphorst kick), 1:14. Raiders 31–21. **Drive: 7 plays, 86 yards.**

**Third quarter**

- OAK – Billy Cannon 1-yard pass from Daryle Lamonica (George Blanda kick), 7:41. Raiders 34–21. **Drive: 11 plays, 75 yards.**

**Fourth quarter**

- OAK – George Blanda 21-yard field goal, 6:48. Raiders 41–21. **Drive: 6 plays, 38 yards.**

**Top passers**

- OAK – Daryle Lamonica – 21/34, 349 yards, 4 TD
- SDG – John Hadl – 18/40, 315 yards, 2 TD, 3 INT

**Top rushers**

- OAK – Larry Todd – 16 rushes, 61 yards, TD
- SDG – Brad Hubbert – 8 rushes, 41 yards

**Top receivers**

- OAK – Bill Miller – 5 receptions, 96 yards, TD
- SDG – Gary Garrison – 3 receptions, 97 yards, TD

==== Week 15: at Miami Dolphins ====
Week Fifteen: San Diego Chargers at Miami Dolphins – Game summary

Quarter	1	2	3	4	Total
Chargers	3	7	14	0	**24**
**Dolphins**	0	13	14	14	**41**

at Orange Bowl, Miami, Florida

- Date: December 10
- Game weather: 75 °F (23.9 °C), relative humidity 78%, wind 13 mph
- Game attendance: 23,007
- Box score

Game information

**First quarter**

- SDG – Dick Van Raaphorst 23-yard field goal, 7:44. Chargers 3–0. **Drive: 7 plays, 50 yards.**

**Second quarter**

- MIA – Jack Harper 37-yard run (Booth Lusteg kick), 13:20. Dolphins 7–3. **Drive: 5 plays, 59 yards.**
- MIA – Booth Lusteg 14-yard field goal, 9:21. Dolphins 10–3. **Drive: 4 plays, 1 yard.**
- SDG – Willie Frazier 4-yard pass from John Hadl (Dick Van Raaphorst kick), 1:02. Tied 10–10. **Drive: 14 plays, 78 yards.**
- MIA – Booth Lusteg 19-yard field goal, 0:03. Dolphins 13–10. **Drive: 5 plays, 65 yards.**

**Third quarter**

- SDG – Russ Smith 14-yard run (Dick Van Raaphorst kick), 12:05. Chargers 17–13. **Drive: 6 plays, 37 yards.**
- MIA – Doug Moreau 10-yard pass from Bob Griese (Booth Lusteg kick), 7:56. Dolphins 20–17. **Drive: 11 plays, 70 yards.**
- MIA – Bob Griese 1-yard run (Booth Lusteg kick), 3:44. Dolphins 27–17. **Drive: 3 plays, 10 yards.**
- SDG – Willie Frazier 38-yard pass from John Hadl (Dick Van Raaphorst kick), 0:58. Dolphins 27–24. **Drive: 5 plays, 76 yards.**

**Fourth quarter**

- MIA – Howard Twilley 10-yard pass from Bob Griese (Booth Lusteg kick), 4:57. Dolphins 34–24. **Drive: 10 plays, 65 yards.**
- MIA – Stan Mitchell 1-yard rush (Booth Lusteg kick), 1:57. Dolphins 41–24. **Drive: 4 plays, 5 yards.**

**Top passers**

- SDG – John Hadl – 9/21, 166 yards, 2 TD, 4 INT
- MIA – Bob Griese – 15/28, 145 yards, 2 TD

**Top rushers**

- SDG – Russ Smith – 13 rushes, 50 yards, TD
- MIA – Jack Harper – 9 rushes, 71 yards, TD

**Top receivers**

- SDG – Jacque MacKinnon – 3 receptions, 80 yards
- MIA – Jack Clancy – 8 receptions, 96 yards

==== Week 16: at Houston Oilers ====
Week Sixteen: San Diego Chargers at Houston Oilers – Game summary

Quarter	1	2	3	4	Total
Chargers	0	7	0	10	**17**
**Oilers**	3	7	7	7	**24**

at Rice Stadium, Houston, Texas

- Date: December 16
- Game time: 1:00 p.m. CST
- Game weather: 46 °F (7.8 °C), relative humidity 97%, wind 8 mph
- Game attendance: 19,870
- Referee: John McDonough
- Box score

Game information

**First quarter**

- HOU – John Wittenborn 31-yard field goal, 5:53. Oilers 3–0. **Drive: 7 plays, 26 yards, 3:19.**

**Second quarter**

- SDG – Brad Hubbert 1-yard pass from John Hadl (Dick Van Raaphorst kick), 13:54. Chargers 7–3. **Drive: 12 plays, 74 yards, 5:13.**
- HOU – Hoyle Granger 1-yard run (John Wittenborn kick), 7:19. Oilers 10–7. **Drive: 13 plays, 79 yards, 6:35.**

**Third quarter**

- HOU – Woody Campbell 8-yard pass from Pete Beathard (John Wittenborn kick), 4:55. Oilers 17–7. **Drive: 12 plays, 59 yards, 6:25.**

**Fourth quarter**

- SDG – Dick Van Raaphorst 18-yard field goal, 11:56. Oilers 17–10. **Drive: 13 plays, 71 yards, 4:20.**
- HOU – Alvin Reed 15-yard pass from Pete Beathard (John Wittenborn kick), 6:37. Oilers 24–10. **Drive: 9 plays, 55 yards, 5:19.**
- SDG – Willie Frazier 16-yard pass from John Hadl (Dick Van Raaphorst kick), 2:50. Oilers 24–17. **Drive: 8 plays, 67 yards, 3:47.**

**Top passers**

- SDG – John Hadl – 23/40, 198 yards, 2 TD
- HOU – Pete Beathard – 14/24, 188 yards, 2 TD, INT

**Top rushers**

- SDG – Brad Hubbert – 13 rushes, 65 yards
- HOU – Hoyle Granger – 27 rushes, 107 yards, TD

**Top receivers**

- SDG – Willie Frazier – 5 receptions, 64 yards, TD
- HOU – Ode Burrell – 5 receptions, 97 yards

==== Week 17: vs. New York Jets ====
Week Seventeen: New York Jets at San Diego Chargers – Game summary

Quarter	1	2	3	4	Total
**Jets**	14	14	14	0	**42**
Chargers	7	17	0	7	**31**

at San Diego Stadium, San Diego, California

- Date: December 24
- Game weather: 58 °F (14.4 °C), relative humidity 41%, wind 6 mph
- Game attendance: 34,580
- Box score

Game information

**First quarter**

- SDG – Willie Frazier 72-yard pass from John Hadl (Dick Van Raaphorst kick). Chargers 7–0.
- NYJ – Don Maynard 13-yard pass from Joe Namath (Jim Turner kick). Tied 7–7.
- NYJ – Bill Mathis 1-yard run (Jim Turner kick). Jets 14–7.

**Second quarter**

- SDG – Brad Hubbert 46-yard run (Dick Van Raaphorst kick). Tied 14–14.
- SDG – Brad Hubbert 80-yard run (Dick Van Raaphorst kick). Chargers 21–14.
- NYJ – George Sauer 36-yard pass from Joe Namath (Jim Turner kick). Tied 21–21.
- SDG – Dick Van Raaphorst 13-yard field goal. Chargers 24–21.
- NYJ – Don Maynard 26-yard pass from Joe Namath (Jim Turner kick). Jets 28–24.

**Third quarter**

- NYJ – Bill Mathis 1-yard run (Jim Turner kick). Jets 35–24.
- NYJ – Don Maynard 36-yard pass from Joe Namath (Jim Turner kick). Jets 42–24.

**Fourth quarter**

- SDG – Jacque MacKinnon 8-yard pass from Kay Stephenson (Dick Van Raaphorst kick). Jets 42–31.

**Top passers**

- NYJ – Joe Namath – 18/26, 343 yards, 4 TD
- SDG – John Hadl – 8/17, 173 yards, TD, INT

**Top rushers**

- NYJ – Abner Haynes – 8 rushes, 34 yards
- SDG – Brad Hubbert – 15 rushes, 189 yards, 2 TD

**Top receivers**

- NYJ – Don Maynard – 8 receptions, 141 yards, 3 TD
- SDG – Gary Garrison – 8 receptions, 115 yards

The Chargers recorded their first-ever home loss to the Jets.

=== Standings ===
AFL Western Division
	W	L	T	PCT	DIV	PF	PA	STK
Oakland Raiders	13	1	0	.929	6–0	468	233	W10
Kansas City Chiefs	9	5	0	.643	2–4	408	254	W3
San Diego Chargers	8	5	1	.615	4–2	360	352	L4
Denver Broncos	3	11	0	.214	0–6	256	409	L1

Note: Tie games were not officially counted in the standings in the AFL.

== Awards ==
Ten Chargers were in the West team for the AFL All-Star game, while three were named to the Associated Press All-AFL first team and one to the second team. Also, Post won the AP AFL Offensive Rookie of the Year award with 17 of the 27 votes, while Hadl and Gillman received votes for Player of the Year and Coach of the Year respectively.

Player	Position	All-Star	AP 1st-team All-Pro	AP 2nd-team All-Pro
Lance Alworth	Flanker	Yes	Yes	
Frank Buncom	Linebacker	Yes		
Speedy Duncan	Cornerback	Yes		Yes
Willie Frazier	Tight end	Yes		
Kenny Graham	Safety	Yes		
Brad Hubbert	Fullback	Yes		
Ron Mix	Tackle	Yes	Yes	
Rick Redman	Linebacker	Yes		
Walt Sweeney	Guard	Yes	Yes	
