= Willie Lanier =

American football player (born 1945)

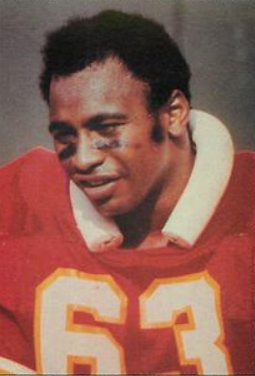
- Lanier displayed on a 1986 card

No. 63
- Position: Linebacker

Personal information
- Born: August 21, 1945 (age 81); Clover, Virginia, U.S.
- Listed height: 6 ft 1 in (1.85 m)
- Listed weight: 245 lb (111 kg)

Career information
- High school: Maggie L. Walker (Richmond, Virginia)
- College: Morgan State (1963–1966)
- NFL draft: 1967: 2nd round, 50th overall pick

Career history
- Kansas City Chiefs (1967–1977)

Awards and highlights
- Super Bowl champion (IV); 8× All-Pro (1968–1975); 6× Pro Bowl (1970–1975); NFL Man of the Year (1972); 2× AFL All-Star (1968, 1969); 2× All-AFL (1968, 1969); NFL 75th Anniversary All-Time Team; NFL 100th Anniversary All-Time Team; Kansas City Chiefs Hall of Honor; Kansas City Chiefs No. 63 retired; First-team Little All-American (1965)

Career NFL/AFL statistics
- Interceptions: 27
- Fumble recoveries: 18
- Touchdowns: 2
- Stats at Pro Football Reference
- Pro Football Hall of Fame
- College Football Hall of Fame

Willie Edward Lanier (born August 21, 1945) is an American former professional football player who was a linebacker for the Kansas City Chiefs of the American Football League (AFL) and the American Football Conference (AFC) of the National Football League (NFL) from 1967 through 1977. He was selected to both the NFL's 75th Anniversary All-Time Team and 100th Anniversary All-Time Team, and inducted into the Pro Football Hall of Fame in 1986. Lanier was presented with the NFL Man of the Year award (now Walter Payton NFL Man of the Year award) in 1972. In 1971, he was the 101 Awards AFC Defensive Player of the Year. In 1985, he was inducted into the Kansas City Chiefs Hall of Honor, and the team has retired his No. 63 jersey.

Lanier won postseason honors for eight consecutive years in the AFL and NFL, making the AFL All-Star team in 1968 and 1969 before being selected to play in the NFL's Pro Bowl from 1970 through 1975. He was first- or second-team All-AFL and All-Pro from 1968 to 1975. His Chiefs' team won Super Bowl IV, Lanier having an interception in that game. He was named the Most Valuable Defensive Player in the January 1972 Pro Bowl.

Lanier attended Morgan State College in Baltimore (now Morgan State University), where he was twice named to All-America teams. His Morgan State teams only lost two games during his career there, and won the 1965 Orange Blossom Classic and 1966 Tangerine Bowl (in which he was named the game's outstanding player). He was inducted into the College Football Hall of Fame in 2000. In 1982, he was inducted into Morgan State's Hall of Fame. The Richmond Times-Dispatch and the Touchdown Club of Richmond renamed their annual award for Virginia's best small college football player after Lanier.

== Early life ==
Lanier was born on August 21, 1945, in Clover, Halifax County, Virginia, the son of Robert Lanier, who was the biggest influence in his son's life. Lanier grew up in Richmond, Virginia. He attended high school in Richmond, at the Maggie L. Walker High School, named after the first black female bank president in America. He was a star football player in high school, graduating in 1963. In his senior year, Walker defeated archrival Armstrong in their annual Thanksgiving Day game 27–13, before 23,000 fans, to give Walker a 10–0 record.

Lanier played linebacker in high school and had a head-first, aggressive, tackling style. At 200 lb (90.7 kg) to 205 lb (93 kg), he was bigger than many high school opponents, and his hard-hitting unintentionally injured a number of them. This included future NFL player Leroy Keyes. He would use this head-first aggressive tackling style through college and into his first season of professional football; until a head injury led his to leading with his shoulder instead of his head when tackling opponents.

Walker was Richmond's largest African American high school, and also produced tennis star Arthur Ashe and NBA player Bob Dandridge. During the years Lanier played football at Walker, black and white high schools did not compete against each other, with black schools playing each other in the Virginia Interscholastic Association, and white schools playing in the Virginia High School League; the two only merging in 1970.

According to a DNA analysis, he descended, mainly, from Jola people of Guinea-Bissau.

== College career ==
Lanier was offered a full scholarship to Virginia State University, but instead chose to attend Morgan State College (now Morgan State University) because (1) he wanted to escape segregation and (2) he saw more employment opportunity in the field of business administration in the Northern section of the United States. Lanier believed he would receive a quality education and support at Morgan State. The Bears' future College Football Hall of Fame head football coach Earl Banks, for whom Lanier played from 1963 to 1966, emphasized academics and graduation to his players. Lanier would go on to earn a bachelor's degree in business administration from Morgan State in 1967. Morgan State is located in Baltimore, and the Bears played football in the Central Intercollegiate Athletic Association (CIAA).

The 210 lb (95.3 kg) Lanier originally pursued attending Morgan State by writing to head coach Banks, seeking a scholarship to play guard on the football team. Lanier had hopes of someday playing professional football, and knew Banks had coached players that went on to NFL careers. Banks was concerned Lanier was too light to play guard, but months later told Lanier to come up to Baltimore; and was immediately impressed by Lanier's powerful neck and weight gain to 230 lb (104.3 kg) and accepted Lanier into Morgan State's program. It has also been stated later that Banks had not recruited Lanier; rather, Lanier was a walk-on who made the team in 1963.

Lanier was originally an offensive guard and a nose tackle on defense with the Bears; playing as a freshman with future Hall of Fame running back Leroy Kelly in 1963. Banks later moved Lanier to middle linebacker on defense. As a junior in 1965, Lanier played both guard and linebacker. Coach Banks said at the time that Lanier was the best professional football prospect the team had since Roosevelt Brown, and that he played Lanier at linebacker as well as guard because "I think his best bet is at linebacker. That's why we play him there".

He was one of the Bears' team captains as a junior. He averaged 12 unassisted tackles a game during the 1965 season, and scored touchdowns on a fumble recovery and interception. The Associated Press selected Lanier as a first-team Little All-American at linebacker. The Bears were 8–0 during the 1965 regular season, and won the CIAA championship. Lanier led the Bears' defense to six shutouts, giving up a total of only 27 points during those eight games, and holding opponents to an average of 12 yards per game rushing. Morgan State then defeated Florida A&M in the Orange Blossom Classic, 36–7, which was the unofficial championship game for historically black colleges and universities.

In 1966, Morgan State was undefeated again. Lanier was the team's captain. The CIAA's coaches voted Lanier the conference's Most Valuable Player; and he was a Pittsburgh Courier first-team All-American at guard (selected among players from 56 predominantly black colleges). He played offensive line for a Bears' team that rushed for 2, 220 yards in eight games. Led by Lanier as its most storied member, the Bears were invited to play in the Tangerine Bowl (now the Citrus Bowl) against the West Chester Rams of Pennsylvania.

The Bears were on a 17-game winning streak going into the Tangerine Bowl, and merited inclusion based on their quality of play. The Bears' selection was a major social event, however, because it was the first time that a team from a black college was invited to play in the Tangerine Bowl, which was held in central Florida. Additionally, the game was played in Orlando which had never hosted an integrated high school or college football game. The game's hosts made sure the two teams were treated equally; and that their players mingled with each other at events before the game.

ABC covered the game on network television, which Morgan State won 14–6. Lanier, playing at guard and middle linebacker, as well as tackle, was selected as the game's Most Valuable Player. Leading the Bears' defense, he was involved in stopping most of West Chester's running plays and in leading the pass rush against its quarterback. His Bears' teammates that year included future NFL players Mark Washington, Raymond Chester, and Bob Wade (who later became head basketball coach at Baltimore's Dunbar High and the first black head coach of a major sport at the University of Maryland).

During Lanier's playing career at Morgan State, the football team only lost two games. He set a school record with 26 tackles in a single game. Lanier was twice selected a small-college All-American. He was All-CIAA three times. Lanier was selected the CIAA Player of the Year for 1966 by the Touchdown Club in Washington, D.C. He was inducted into the Morgan State Hall of Fame in 1982. The Richmond Times-Dispatch and the Touchdown Club of Richmond renamed the annual award for Virginia's best small college football player after Lanier.

Lanier is a member of The Pigskin Club of Washington, D.C. National Intercollegiate All-American Football Players Honor Roll.

== Professional career ==
On January 15, 1967, the Chiefs lost Super Bowl I to Vince Lombardi's Green Bay Packers by a 35–10 score, forcing head coach Hank Stram to look for defensive players in the upcoming draft. Stram picked the 6 ft 1 in (1.85 m) 245 lb (111 kg) Lanier. Lanier had been scouted by Frank Barnes for the Chiefs, and was selected in the second round of the 1967 NFL/AFL draft with the 50th overall pick, three picks after the Chiefs selected linebacker Jim Lynch of the high-profile Notre Dame Fighting Irish. Lynch had won the Maxwell Award for best college player and was a unanimous All-American.

=== Starting middle linebacker ===
Lanier appeared in 10 games for the Chiefs in 1967, starting five games at middle linebacker; with Lynch starting four games at linebacker that season. Lanier joined Garland Boyette of the AFL's Houston Oilers as the first black middle linebackers in professional American football history. Before then, black players were not made middle linebackers. Middle linebackers functioned as the defensive quarterback on teams, calling defensive signals. Lanier was fully aware that blacks had not been made middle linebackers in professional football; and hoped he would be given a chance based upon being qualified for the position. The Chiefs gave Lanier the opportunity. Two years later, Lanier observed that "'The Chiefs have been very fair in the treatment of black players and the relationships between blacks and whites on this club is very good on and off the field'". Stram described Lanier's ability to read offenses as outstanding.

There are a number of descriptions as to how Lanier became the starting middle linebacker over Lynch. Early in the 1969 season, Stram said that either Lanier or Lynch could have started at middle linebacker as rookies, because of their high intelligence and outstanding physical abilities. Stram chose Lanier because Lanier was bigger, saying "'We had had trouble before with people running up the middle on us. I knew they wouldn't do that with Lanier there'". Chiefs' owner Lamar Hunt said that when Stram saw both players in training camp, he realized both rookies should be playing, with Lanier at middle linebacker and Lynch moving to outside linebacker. In another explanation, Lynch had been chosen to play in the annual Chicago Charities College All-Star Game, causing him to miss the first two weeks of Chiefs' 1967 training camp. By the time Lynch made it to camp, Lanier had already established himself as the team's middle linebacker. Lynch went on to start 137 consecutive games as the Chiefs' right linebacker from 1968 to 1977.

In Lanier's second start at middle linebacker, an October 15, 1967 game against the San Diego Chargers, Lanier suffered a head injury when tackling Brad Hubbert head-first. Lanier had headaches and double vision for the next two weeks, but continued as the starting middle linebacker; until collapsing in an October 29 game against the Denver Broncos, and being carried from the field unconscious. He woke up in the hospital thinking he might be dying, and then that his football career was over and his health and family were the most important aspects of his life to focus upon. He continued to have double vision, that improved over time; and based his hope for recovery from the double vision on baseball player Frank Robinson's similar experience that healed over time. Lanier only started one more game in 1967, and when he returned to his hard-hitting style in 1968, Lanier led with his shoulder in making tackles; and no longer his head.

In 1968, Lanier started all 14 games at middle linebacker, with four interceptions. Lynch started at right linebacker and future Hall of Famer Bobby Bell at left linebacker. The three would become one of the top linebacker groups in professional football history; be a part of the Chiefs Super Bowl IV championship team; and play together as a unit until Bell's retirement after the 1974 season.

In an early December 1968 game against the San Diego Chargers, Lanier intercepted a John Hadl pass and returned it 75 yards for a touchdown. Lanier was selected to play in the AFL All-Star Game that season (as were Bell and Lynch). Lanier was named first-team All-AFL by the Associated Press (AP) and Newspaper Enterprise Association (NEA), and second team All-AFL by The Sporting News (with Bell unanimously named first-team All-AFL and Lynch second-team All-AFL).

=== Super Bowl IV season (1969) ===
Lanier started all 14 games in 1969 with four interceptions; and also had one quarterback sack and a fumble recovery. He was again selected to play in the AFL All-Star Game; and was named first-team All-AFL by the Pro Football Writers of America, second-team All-NFL/AFL by the Pro Football Hall of Fame, and second-team All-AFL by the NEA, The Sporting News, and United Press International (UPI).

The Chiefs finished the 1969 season with an 11–3 record; second in the AFL's West Division. The Chiefs' defense led the AFL in allowing the fewest points, fewest total yards, fewest rushing yards, and fewest passing yards; and had the most sacks. It has been considered one of the greatest defensive units in NFL history. Six members of that Chiefs' defense would eventually be inducted into the Pro Football Hall of Fame (Lanier, Bell, Buck Buchanan, Curly Culp, Emmitt Thomas and Johnny Robinson; with Lanier, Bell and Buchanan named to the NFL 100th Anniversary All-Time Team). The Chiefs defeated the defending Super Bowl Champion New York Jets in the divisional round of the 1969 AFL playoffs, 13–6. The Chiefs next won the 1969 AFL Championship Game over the Oakland Raiders, 10–6; becoming the only team in AFL history to win three championships.

There were numerous great moments throughout Lanier's career, but none exemplifies his heart and desire as much as the Chiefs' goal line stand against the New York Jets in the 1969 divisional playoff game. Trailing 6–3 in the fourth quarter, New York had a first-and-goal at the Chiefs' one-yard line after a pass interference call on Kansas City. It was then that Lanier made an emotional appeal to the rest of the Chiefs' defense, yelling: "They're not going to score...! They're not going to score!" The Chiefs shut down the Jets on three straight plays and held them to a field goal. Kansas City scored a touchdown on its next possession, winning the game, and winning a place in the Super Bowl.

Lanier helped the Chiefs capture Super Bowl IV with a 23–7 upset of the Minnesota Vikings. He was stellar in the Super Bowl, recording eight tackles (four solo and four combined) and an interception, and provided inspiration to the defensive unit. This was the final game by an AFL team before the AFL completed its merger with the NFL in the 1970 season. Lanier said the Chiefs' felt an increased motivation to win that game because of wearing a ten-year AFL patch to honor the final season of the AFL's 10-year independent existence, stating "'It lit us up. We knew what it meant'". In 2019, the 1969 Chiefs were selected as the 27th greatest all-time team by the NFL.

Lanier started all 14 games in 1970, but the Chiefs record fell to 7–5–2. Lanier was named to his first Pro Bowl, after the AFL-NFL merger. He was named second-team All-Pro by the Pro Football Writers and NEA, and first-team All-AFC by the AP, Pro Football Weekly, The Sporting News, and UPI. In 1971, the Chiefs improved to 10–3–1, first in the AFC's West Division. Lanier again started all 14 games with two interceptions and three fumble recoveries. He was again selected to the Pro Bowl, and was named first-team All-Pro by the AP, Pro Football Writers, Pro Football Weekly, and the NEA. He received the 101 Award as the AFC's Defensive Player of the Year for 1971. Lanier was also voted the Defensive Player of the Game in the January 23, 1972 Pro Bowl.

=== Longest NFL game ever ===
The Chiefs reached the NFL playoffs for the last time in Lanier's career in 1971. They lost in divisional round of the 1971–72 NFL playoffs to the Miami Dolphins, 27–24, on Christmas Day. This was the final football game played at Kansas City's Municipal Stadium. The game went into double overtime, and is the longest game played in NFL history, at 82 minutes and forty seconds. Lanier had an interception in the game, that he returned for 17 yards.

After the game, Lanier said "'There's no blaming of anyone . . . I missed big tackles, someone misses a kick. So what? You're looking for an easy way out when you do that, and there's no easy way when you lose'". Instead, he commended the Dolphins' effort, "'They came up with the big third down plays, that's all. We'd go ahead, they'd tie it up. You should talk about their ability to come back. That's worth it'". Dolphins' future Hall of Fame fullback Larry Csonka said admiringly of Lanier after the game "'It's tough running against a grizzly bear and it's worse if he's a smart one . . . Lanier against power football is what defense is all about'".

After the 1971 season ended, his fifth in the NFL, the 26-year old Lanier reflected upon the violent nature of his playing style, and the physical toll it took more and more on his own body each year.

After a while you get tired and your body hurts all over. I hit the other guy, but don't forget that I get hit, too. If I hit a [237 pound] Csonka one-on-one in the open field I feel it all through my body. . . . If a running back has up a full head of speed when you hit him it's going to hurt you just as much as it does him. I hit Speedy Duncan after the first kick-off in the Pro Bowl. . . . I was groggy and seeing double when I got up. . . . If you're a man with a family and you make a hit like that it makes you wonder if sometime you won't get up again.

Lanier said it was not feasible to maintain the constant hard-hitting style of himself or a Dick Butkus through the 20 games of a season (Butkus also playing on special teams), including exhibition games; without injury and slippage in playing ability over time. "'What you do is burn yourself out if you try to overpower everyone'". Lanier believed he had to change his technique, and limit the number of big hit plays.

In 1972, the Chiefs moved to Arrowhead Stadium. The team's record fell to 8–6. Lanier started 13 games, with two interceptions and two fumble recoveries. He was again chosen to play in the Pro Bowl. Pro Football Weekly named him first-team All-Pro and the NEA named him second team All-Pro. The Sporting News and UPI named Lanier first-team All-AFC. In a season long voting process, fans selected Lanier as the Vitalis NFL Man of the Year (now the Walter Payton Man of the Year award), based upon both his athletic ability and civic involvement. In addition to playing for the Chiefs, Lanier devoted considerable time with youth groups in Kansas City as part of a campaign to prevent drug abuse; and raised funds for the American Cancer Society. Lanier was also the Chiefs' union representative to the National Football League Players Association.

In 1973, Lanier started all 14 games again, with three interceptions, three fumble recoveries and one sack. The Chiefs were 7–5–2. In a September 30 game against the Oakland Raiders, he returned an interception 17 yards for a touchdown. Lanier was again selected to play in the Pro Bowl. The AP named him first-team All-Pro, and the Pro Football Writers and NEA named him second-team All-Pro. In 1974, the Chiefs were 5–9; the team's talent being depleted by age and injuries. Curley Culp was traded during the season, Buck Buchanan was 35, and Bobby Bell was playing his last season. After the conclusion of that season, Stram was fired after 15 years as head coach. The 29-year old Lanier played in all 14 games, with two interceptions, two fumble recoveries, and a safety. He was named to the Pro Bowl again, and was selected second-team All-Pro by the AP, Pro Football Writers, and NEA.

Lanier played three more seasons for the Chiefs (1975 to 1977), missing only three starts in 1976. He was selected to the Pro Bowl for the final time in the 1975 season, and named first-team All-Pro by the NEA and second-team All-Pro by the Pro Football Writers that year. In April 1978, the Chiefs traded Lanier to the Baltimore Colts, but Lanier announced his retirement as an active player three months later on July 20, 1978.

Lanier had 27 career interceptions, two returned for touchdowns, and 18 fumble recoveries. His nickname was "Contact", given by teammate Jerry Mays, because of the force with which Lanier hit opposing players. He later was nicknamed "Honey Bear" because of his bear-hug tackling style. After his rookie season, over the next 10 seasons he only missed one game.

== Legacy and honors ==
Lanier was All-Pro, All-AFL and/or All-AFC from 1968 through 1975. He was chosen for the last two AFL All-Star games at the end of the 1968 and 1969 seasons. He played in the first six AFC-NFC Pro Bowl games after the merger of the AFL and NFL, and was the Defensive Player of the Game in the January 1972 Pro Bowl. He was named AFC Defensive Player of the Year in 1971. In 1972, he was named NFL Man of the Year (now the Walter Payton NFL Man of the Year).

Lanier was selected to the Chiefs' Hall of Honor in 1985. He was selected to the Pro Football Hall of Fame in 1986, with his enshrinement speech given by Hall of Fame Chiefs owner Lamar Hunt. The Chiefs retired Lanier's number in August 1992. He was selected to both the NFL 75th Anniversary All-Time Team in 1994 and the NFL 100th Anniversary All-Time Team in 2019. He was inducted into the Missouri Sports Hall of Fame in 1999. Also in 1999, he was ranked number 42 on The Sporting News' list of the 100 Greatest Football Players, which also included his defensive teammates, Bobby Bell, Buck Buchanan, and Emmitt Thomas (ranked 66 to 68). He was ranked as the 80th greatest player of all time by The Athletic in its 2021 list.

While he was a player, Lanier spoke highly of Hall of Fame offensive tackle Bob Brown, and considered Larry Csonka and Jim Nance to be running backs who inflicted more punishment on defensive players attempting to tackle them than other running backs he played against.

Lanier has received the following awards and honors, among others;

- Pro Football Hall of Fame (1986) (second Chiefs' player inducted into Pro Football Hall of Fame after Bobby Bell in 1983)
- College Football Hall of Fame (2000)
- Associated Press (AP) first-team Little All-America team (1965)
- Pittsburgh Courier All-America Team (1966)
- Selected CIAA player of the year by Touchdown Club in Washington, D.C. (1966)
- Most Valuable Player Tangerine Bowl (1966)
- Pro Bowl defensive Most Valuable Player (1971)
- 101 Awards AFC Defensive Player of the Year (1971)
- Walter Payton NFL Man of the Year Award (charitable work as player-citizen) (1972)
- Morgan State Hall of Fame (1982)
- Chiefs' Hall of Honor (1985)
- Virginia Sports Hall of Fame (1986)
- Richmond holds Willie Lanier Day and starts Willie Lanier Scholarship Fund (1986)
- Named Virginian of the Year by Virginia Press Association (1986)
- NFL 75th Anniversary All-Time Team (1994)
- Ranked number 42 on The Sporting News' list of the 100 Greatest Football Players, the highest-ranking Chief (1999)
- Missouri Sports Hall of Fame (1999)
- Richmond Times-Dispatch and the Touchdown Club of Richmond rename annual award for Virginia's best small college football player after Lanier (2004)
- NFL 100th Anniversary All Time Team (2019)
- No. 53 on The Top 100: NFL's Greatest Players
- Ranked as the 80th greatest player all-time by The Athletic (2021)

=== Statistics ===
		Interceptions				Fumbles
Season	Games	Int	Yds	Avg	TD	FumRec	Yds	TotScore
1967	10	0	0	0	0	1	0	0
1968	14	4	120	30	1	0	0	6
1969	14	4	70	17.5	0	1	5	0
1970	14	2	2	1	0	2	0	0
1971	14	2	38	19	0	3	3	0
1972	13	2	2	1.0	0	2	0	0
1973	14	3	47	15.7	1	3	10	0
1974	14	2	28	14	0	2	3	6
1975	14	5	105	21	0	0	0	2
1976	14	3	28	9.3	0	2	0	0
1977	14	0	0	0.0	0	2	0	0
Total	149	27	440	16.3	2	18	21	14

== Personal life ==
During the off seasons, Lanier became licensed in real estate and securities, and worked as a stock broker. In 1975, Lanier had been in the Executive Program at the University of Virginia.

After retiring, Lanier returned to school, taking graduate courses at the University of Missouri–Kansas City to receive an MBA. He eventually returned to Richmond, becoming a business executive. He became a stockbroker, at First Union Securities, where he served as vice-chairman. He is the former CEO of TDS/US, the minority venture partner of TDS Logistics, which became Syncreon, against which Lanier wound up in litigation. He was also a president of First Wheat Securities in Richmond. Lanier directs the Lanier Group LLC investment firm, and is active in charitable causes.

In 2006, Lanier was interviewed for the NFL Network documentary America's Game: The Super Bowl Champions chronicling the 1969 Kansas City Chiefs season.

== Acting career ==
In 1974, Lanier starred in The Black Six as Tommy Bunka. The movie, which was directed by Matt Cimber (Matteo Ottaviano), was about racism in a southern town, with six black bikers (The Black Six) avenging the death of a friend. Lanier teamed with other 1970s players including Joe Greene, Carl Eller, Gene Washington, and Mercury Morris.

== See also ==
- Other American Football League players
