= Sligh =

Sligh is a surname. Notable people with the surname include:

- Chris Sligh (born 1978), American singer, songwriter, producer, and pastor
- Clarissa Sligh (born 1939), African-American book artist and photographer
- Richard Sligh (1944–2008), American collegiate and professional American football player
