= Willie Brown (American football) =

American football player, coach and administrator (1940–2019)

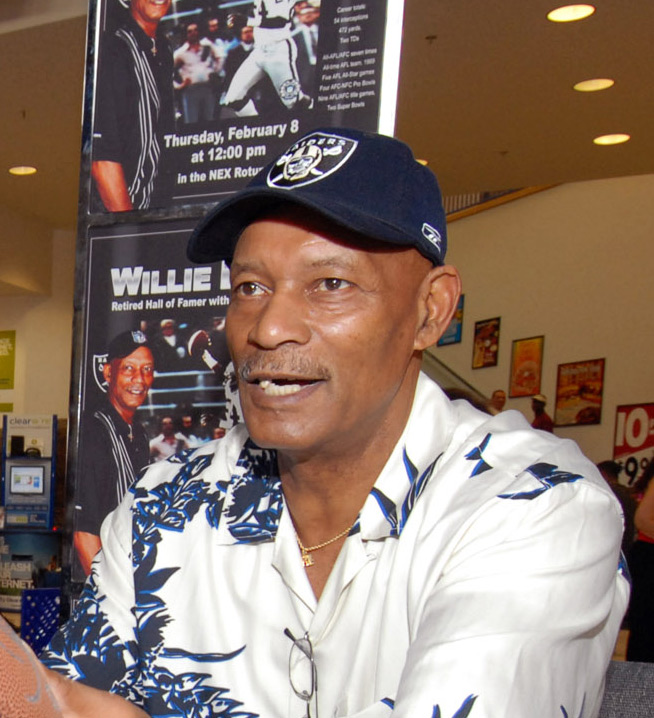
- Brown in 2007

No. 24
- Position: Cornerback

Personal information
- Born: December 2, 1940; Yazoo City, Mississippi, U.S.
- Died: October 21, 2019 (aged 78); Tracy, California, U.S.
- Listed height: 6 ft 1 in (1.85 m)
- Listed weight: 195 lb (88 kg)

Career information
- High school: Taylor (Yazoo City)
- College: Grambling (1959–1962)
- AFL draft: 1963: undrafted

Career history

Playing
- Houston Oilers (1963)*; Denver Broncos (1963–1966); Oakland Raiders (1967–1978)
- * Offseason or practice squad member only

Coaching
- Oakland / Los Angeles Raiders (1979–1988) Defensive backs coach; Long Beach State (1991) Head coach; Jordan HS (CA) (1994) Head coach

Operations
- Oakland Raiders (1995–2019) Director of staff development

Awards and highlights
- As a player: Super Bowl champion (XI); AFL champion (1967); 3× First-team All-AFL (1964, 1968, 1969); 2× First-team All-Pro (1971, 1973); Second-team All-AFL (1967); Second-team All-Pro (1972); 5× AFL All-Star (1964, 1965, 1967–1969); 4× Pro Bowl (1970–1973); NFL 100th Anniversary All-Time Team; NFL 1970s All-Decade Team; AFL All-Time Team; As a coach: 2× Super Bowl champion (XV, XVIII); AFL record: Most passes intercepted in a game: 4 (tied)

Career AFL/NFL statistics
- Interceptions: 54
- Interception yards: 472
- Fumble recoveries: 4
- Safeties: 1
- Defensive touchdowns: 2
- Stats at Pro Football Reference

Head coaching record
- Career: College: 2–9 (.182)
- Pro Football Hall of Fame

William Ferdie Brown (December 2, 1940 – October 21, 2019) was an American professional football player, coach, and administrator. He played as a cornerback for the Denver Broncos and the Oakland Raiders of the American Football League (AFL) and later in the National Football League (NFL). Following his playing career, Brown remained with the Raiders as an assistant coach. He served as the head football coach at California State University, Long Beach in 1991, the final season before the school's football program was terminated. Brown was inducted into the Pro Football Hall of Fame as a player in 1984. At the time of his death he was on the Raiders' administrative staff.

== Early life ==
Brown was born on December 2, 1940, in Yazoo City, Mississippi. He grew up on Mushroom Street, with his parents, six brothers and two sisters. He attended the all black N. D. Taylor High School in the segregated city, known as Yazoo No. 2 (made famous in Yazoo author Willie Morris's My Dog Skip). He played both offense and defense for coach Peter Boston, brother of Olympic track star Ralph Boston. In 1978, the city changed the name Mushroom Street to Willie Brown Street. Brown was inducted into the Mississippi Sports Hall of Fame in 1994.

== College career ==
Brown played college football at Grambling College—now Grambling State University, located in Louisiana. He played both offense (split end) and defense (linebacker), under College Football Hall of Fame coach Eddie Robinson (one of over 80 Robinson players to reach the AFL or NFL). Robinson said that Brown would have been a great running back or tight end as well because he was an outstanding blocker. While at Grambling, Brown was All-Southwestern Atlantic Conference (SWAC) as an outside linebacker, as well as in track and field.

Brown was senior class president at Grambling in 1963. In 1985, he was inducted into the Louisiana Sports Hall of Fame. He was inducted in the SWAC Hall of Fame in 1993.

One of Brown's Grambling teammates was future Pro Football Hall of Fame player and NFL 100th Anniversary All-Time teammate Buck Buchanan, who would go on to play with the Raiders arch-rival Kansas City Chiefs.

== Professional career ==
Brown was not drafted by any professional team after leaving school in 1963. Coach Robinson convinced coach Pop Ivy to give Brown a tryout with the Houston Oilers of the American Football League (AFL). Brown was signed, but was cut from the team during training camp. He was then signed by the AFL's Denver Broncos and became a starting cornerback by the middle of his rookie season. In his second season (1964), Brown had 9 interceptions, including four against the New York Jets in one game, won All-AFL honors, and played in the AFL All-Star Game where he was named outstanding defensive player.

In 1967, Brown was traded within the Western Division to the Oakland Raiders and spent the remainder of his playing career there. He served as defensive captain for 10 of his 12 years with the team. He was named to five AFL All-Star games and four NFL Pro Bowls. He was also named All-AFL three times and All-NFL four times.

Brown became a Raider’s defensive captain. In 1969, he was presented with the Gorman Award as “'the player who best exemplifies the pride and spirit of the Oakland Raiders.'”

Perhaps Brown's most memorable moment as a Raider came late in Super Bowl XI, when he intercepted a Fran Tarkenton pass with under six minutes remaining and returned it a Super Bowl-record 75 yards for the clinching touchdown. NFL Films immortalized Brown's play with a film clip of Brown running with the ball, appearing to be running straight to the camera. He was also given a popular nickname as a result of Bill King's radio call of the play: "He (Tarkenton) looks and throws...intercepted by the Oakland Raiders Willie Brown at the 30, 40, 50...he’s going all the way!...Old Man Willie!...Touchdown Raiders!" His record stood for 29 years, until it was broken by Kelly Herndon's non-scoring 76-yard interception return from the end zone in Super Bowl XL.

Brown had five interception returns for touchdowns, two in the regular season and three in the playoffs. In addition to the touchdown scored against Tarkenton, he returned an interception against future Hall of Fame Miami quarterback Bob Griese in the 1970 playoffs. The other playoff touchdown occurred in the 1973 playoffs when Brown intercepted future hall of fame Steelers quarterback Terry Bradshaw and returned the ball 54 yards for a score. All three of Brown's playoff interception touchdown returns were against Hall of Fame quarterbacks. His two regular season interception touchdown returns were against Griese and future Hall of Fame Kansas City Chiefs quarterback Len Dawson.

Brown retired after the 1978 season, and finished his Raiders career with 39 interceptions, tied for first all-time on the team. He finished his sixteen seasons in professional football with 54 interceptions, which he returned for 472 yards and two touchdowns. He also recovered three fumbles.

== Legacy ==
Brown was selected to the American Football League All-Time Team and was inducted into the Pro Football Hall of Fame on July 28, 1984, his first year of eligibility. In 1999, he was ranked number 50 on The Sporting News' list of the 100 Greatest Football Players, making him the highest-ranking Raiders player. In 2019, he was named to the NFL 100th Anniversary All-Time Team, a distinction he shared with Raiders teammates Jim Otto, Art Shell, and Gene Upshaw. In 2021, The Athletic listed him as the 90th greatest player ever.

Brown is often cited as one of the earliest, if not the earliest, cornerback to use the bump and run defensive technique against receivers.

== Coaching and post-coaching career ==
Brown served as a defensive backfield coach for the Raiders from 1979 to 1988, during which time the Raiders won two Super Bowls, in 1981 (Super Bowl XV) and 1984 (Super Bowl XVIII). As a defensive backs coach, he played a key part in developing All-Pro and Pro Bowl cornerbacks Lester Hayes (who shares the Raiders interception record with Brown at 39) and Mike Haynes. He was also the last head football coach at Long Beach State before the program was discontinued. Brown had succeeded George Allen, who had died just after the end of the 1990 season.

He earned a master's degree at the same school in 1991, and later coached at Jordan High School in Los Angeles in 1994. Of becoming a high school coach after a storied career, Brown said, "'The bottom line is these kids need help. ... If I can help on or off the field or in or out of the classroom, then I have made some kind of contribution.'" In 1995, he returned to the Raiders when they moved back to Oakland as the Director of Staff Development. He continued to work for the Raiders in various capacities over the years, culminating in serving as a team ambassador. Even after his coaching days ended, Brown spent time working with Raiders defensive backs like future hall of famers Charles Woodson and Rod Woodson.

== Career statistics ==
=== AFL/NFL ===
Legend
	Won the Super Bowl
	Led the league
**Bold**	Career high

==== Regular season ====
Year	Team	Games		Interceptions					Fumbles			
Year	Team	GP	GS	Int	Yds	Y/I	Lng	TD	FR	Yds	Y/F	TD
1963	DEN	8	6	1	0	0.0	0	0	0	0	0.0	0
1964	DEN	**14**	**14**	**9**	**140**	15.6	**45**	0	0	0	—	0
1965	DEN	**14**	11	2	18	9.0	18	0	0	0	0.0	0
1966	DEN	**14**	**14**	3	37	12.3	31	0	0	0	0.0	0
1967	OAK	**14**	12	7	33	4.7	25	**1**	**2**	0	0.0	0
1968	OAK	**14**	**14**	2	27	13.5	27	**1**	0	0	—	0
1969	OAK	**14**	**14**	5	111	22.2	30	0	0	0	0.0	0
1970	OAK	8	7	3	0	0.0	0	0	0	0	0.0	0
1971	OAK	**14**	**14**	2	2	2.0	2	0	0	0	—	0
1972	OAK	**14**	**14**	4	26	6.5	13	0	**2**	0	0.0	0
1973	OAK	**14**	**14**	3	-1	-0.3	-1	0	0	0	0.0	0
1974	OAK	9	9	1	31	**31.0**	31	0	0	0	—	0
1975	OAK	12	12	4	-1	-0.3	0	0	0	0	—	0
1976	OAK	**14**	**14**	3	25	8.3	22	0	0	0	0.0	0
1977	OAK	**14**	**14**	4	24	6.0	18	0	0	0	0.0	0
1978	OAK	13	2	1	0	0.0	0	0	0	0	0.0	0
Career		204	185	54	472	8.8	45	2	4	0	0.0	0

==== Postseason ====
Year	Team	Games		Interceptions					Fumbles			
Year	Team	GP	GS	Int	Yds	Y/I	Lng	TD	FR	Yds	Y/F	TD
1967	OAK	2	2	1	2	2.0	2	0	0	0	—	0
1968	OAK	2	2	1	0	—	0	0	0	0	—	0
1969	OAK	2	2	1	15	15.0	15	0	0	0	—	0
1970	OAK	2	2	1	50	50.0	50	**1**	0	0	—	0
1972	OAK	1	1	0	0	—	0	0	0	0	—	0
1973	OAK	2	2	**2**	54	27.0	54	**1**	0	0	—	0
1975	OAK	1	0	0	0	—	0	0	0	0	0.0	0
1976	OAK	**3**	**3**	1	**75**	**75.0**	**75**	**1**	0	0	0.0	0
1977	OAK	2	2	0	0	—	0	0	0	0	—	0
Career		17	16	7	96	13.7	75	3	0	0	0.0	0

=== Head coaching record ===
Year	Team	Overall	Conference	Standing	Bowl/playoffs
**Long Beach State 49ers** (Big West Conference) (1991)
1991	Long Beach State	2–9	2–5	T–5th	
Long Beach State:		2–9	2–5		
Total:		2–9			

== Career highlights ==
=== Awards and honors ===
As a player

- Super Bowl champion (XI)
- AFL champion (1967)
- 3× First-team All-AFL (1964, 1968, 1969)
- 2× First-team All-Pro (1971, 1973)
- Second-team All-AFL (1967)
- Second-team All-Pro (1972)
- 5× AFL All-Star (1964, 1965, 1967–1969)
- 4× Pro Bowl (1970–1973)
- NFL 100th Anniversary All-Time Team
- No. 66 on The Top 100: NFL's Greatest Players
- NFL 1970s All-Decade Team
- AFL All-Time Team
- 90th greatest player of all time listed by The Athletic (2021)
- Pro Football Hall of Fame (1984)
- Louisiana Sports Hall of Fame (1985)
- Mississippi Sports Hall of Fame (1994)

As a coach

- 2× Super Bowl champion (XV, XVIII)

=== Records ===
- AFL record most passes intercepted in a game: 4 (tied)
- Previously held Super Bowl record for longest interception (75 yards, Super Bowl XI), now held by Pittsburgh Steelers linebacker James Harrison (100 yards, Super Bowl XLIII)
- Oakland Raiders franchise leader for interceptions (39, t-1st)

== Personal life ==
While still playing, Brown worked for Shell Oil Company during the off-season in both public and employee relations. In 1972, the NFL honored Brown for his work with its drug abuse campaign. Al Davis owned the Raiders during the time Brown played for the team, and Davis gave the induction speech when Brown entered the Professional Football Hall of Fame in Canton, Ohio. Over the years, Brown showed great care, kindness, and attention to Davis's wife Carol, and became her best friend.

Brown died on October 21, 2019, at the age of 78. He had been dealing with cancer.

== See also ==
- List of American Football League players
