= Jack Lentz =

American gridiron football player (born 1945)

No. 28
- Position: Defensive back

Personal information
- Born: February 22, 1945 (age 81); Baltimore, Maryland, U.S.
- Listed height: 6 ft 0 in (1.83 m)
- Listed weight: 190 lb (86 kg)

Career information
- High school: Loyola Blakefield (Towson, Maryland)
- College: Holy Cross (1965-1966)
- NFL draft: 1967: 16th round, 399th overall pick

Career history
- Denver Broncos (1967-1968); Montreal Alouettes (1969)

Career AFL statistics
- Interceptions: 5
- Fumble recoveries: 2
- Stats at Pro Football Reference

Jack Lentz (born February 22, 1945) is an American former professional football player who was a defensive back in the American Football League (AFL) and Canadian Football League (CFL). He played college football for the Holy Cross Crusaders. Lentz played in the AFL for the Denver Broncos from 1967 to 1968 and in the CFL for the Montreal Alouettes in 1969.
