= Carl Cunningham =

American football player (born 1944)

No. 50, 60
- Position: Linebacker

Personal information
- Born: July 23, 1944 (age 82); Houston, Texas, U.S.
- Listed height: 6 ft 4 in (1.93 m)
- Listed weight: 230 lb (104 kg)

Career information
- High school: Waltrip (Houston)
- College: Houston (1963-1966)
- NFL draft: 1967: 4th round, 85th overall pick

Career history
- Denver Broncos (1967-1970); New Orleans Saints (1971)

Career NFL/AFL statistics
- Interceptions: 4
- Fumble recoveries: 2
- Stats at Pro Football Reference

Carl Madison Cunningham (born July 23, 1944) is an American former professional football player who was a linebacker for five seasons in the National Football League (NFL) for the Denver Broncos and New Orleans Saints. He played college football for the Houston Cougars. Cunningham was selected by Denver in the fourth round of the 1967 NFL/AFL draft.
