= 1967 Oakland Raiders season =

AFL team season

- Owner: F. Wayne Valley
- General manager: Scotty Stirling
- Head coach: John Rauch
- Home stadium: Oakland–Alameda County Coliseum

Results
- Record: 13–1
- Division place: 1st AFL Western
- Playoffs: Won AFL Championship (vs. Oilers) 40–7; Lost Super Bowl II (vs. Packers) 14–33

The 1967 Oakland Raiders season was the team's eighth in Oakland. Under the command of second-year head coach John Rauch, the Raiders went 13–1 (.929), an American Football League (AFL) record, and captured their first Western Division title, four games ahead of runner-up Kansas City, the defending league champion.

The addition of strong-armed quarterback Daryle Lamonica greatly energized the Raiders' vertical passing game. Additionally, the Raiders added Gene Upshaw, Willie Brown, and George Blanda to their roster as well as linebackers coach (and future head coach) John Madden prior to the 1967 season. All four were later elected to the Pro Football Hall of Fame.

The Raiders routed the visiting Houston Oilers in the AFL championship game on New Year's Eve. They advanced to Super Bowl II in Miami two weeks later, but were defeated by the NFL champion Green Bay Packers, and finished at 14–2 (.875).

== Offseason ==
=== Undrafted free agents ===
1967 undrafted free agents of note
Player	Position	College
John Guillory	Defensive back	Stanford

== Personnel ==
=== Staff / Coaches ===
1967 Oakland Raiders staff
Front office: Majority Co-Owner - F. Wayne Valley; Minority Co-Owner/General Manager - Al Davis; Minority Co-Owner - Ed McGah; President / Managing General Partner / General Manager – Al Davis; Senior Executive – John Herrera; Head coaches: Head coach – John Rauch; Offensive coaches: Running Backs – John Polonchek; Tight ends – Bill Meyers; Offensive line – Ollie Spencer	Defensive coaches: Defensive line – Tom Dahms; Linebackers – John Madden; Defensive Backfield – Charlie Sumner; Special teams coaches: Special teams – John Rauch; Strength and conditioning: Strength and Conditioning - Marv Marinovich

=== Roster ===
1967 Oakland Raiders roster
Quarterbacks (QB): 16 George Blanda K; 3 Daryle Lamonica; Running backs (RB): 40 Pete Banaszak; 35 Hewritt Dixon; 30 Roger Hagberg; 22 Larry Todd; Wide receivers (WR): 25 Fred Biletnikoff; 89 Bill Miller; 23 Rod Sherman; 81 Warren Wells; Tight ends (TE): 33 Billy Cannon; 84 Ken Herock; 88 Dave Kocourek	Offensive linemen (OL): 78 Dan Archer T; 70 Jim Harvey G; 65 Wayne Hawkins G; 62 Bob Kruse C/G; 00 Jim Otto C; 79 Harry Schuh T; 76 Bob Svihus T; 63 Gene Upshaw G; Defensive linemen (DL): 53 Dan Birdwell DT; 83 Ben Davidson DE; 74 Tom Keating DT; 77 Ike Lassiter DE; 85 Carleton Oats DE/DT; 73 Richard Sligh DT	Linebackers (LB): 50 Duane Benson OLB; 48 Bill Budness MLB; 55 Dan Conners MLB; 42 Bill Laskey OLB; 34 Gus Otto OLB; 52 J. R. Williamson OLB; Defensive backs (DB): 21 Rodger Bird SS; 24 Willie Brown CB; 45 Dave Grayson FS/CB; 47 Kent McCloughan CB; 20 Warren Powers SS; 29 Howie Williams FS; Special teams (ST): 11 Mike Eischeid P	Practice squad: Rick Egloff QB; John Guillory CB; Reserve: 38 Estes Banks RB (IR); 36 Clem Daniels RB (IR); 19 Cotton Davidson QB (IR); 86 Bill Fairband LB (IR); -- Mike Hibler LB (IR); Rookies in italics

== Team leaders ==
Passing

Daryle Lamonica – 3,228 yds., 30 TD, 20 INT, 80.8 rating

Rushing

Clem Daniels – 130 att., 575 yds., 4 TD

Receiving

Fred Biletnikoff – 40 rec., 876 yds., 5 TD

== Regular season ==
Over the course of a fourteen-game regular season schedule, the Raiders faced six of the other eight AFL teams twice, with one game against the Eastern Division's Houston Oilers and Miami Dolphins. The AFL's only scheduled playoff was the championship game between the two division winners. A playoff round was added two years later, in its final season.

Week	Date	Opponent	Result	Record	Venue	Attendance	Recap
1	Bye						
2	September 10	**Denver Broncos**	**W** 51–0	1–0	Oakland–Alameda County Coliseum	25,423	Recap
3	September 17	Boston Patriots	**W** 35–7	2–0	Oakland–Alameda County Coliseum	26,289	Recap
4	Bye						
5	October 1	**Kansas City Chiefs**	**W** 23–21	3–0	Oakland–Alameda County Coliseum	50,268	Recap
6	October 7	at New York Jets	**L** 14–27	3–1	Shea Stadium	63,106	Recap
7	October 15	at Buffalo Bills	**W** 24–20	4–1	War Memorial Stadium	45,758	Recap
8	October 22	at Boston Patriots	**W** 48–14	5–1	Fenway Park	25,057	Recap
9	October 29	**San Diego Chargers**	**W** 51–10	6–1	Oakland–Alameda County Coliseum	53,474	Recap
10	November 5	at **Denver Broncos**	**W** 21–17	7–1	Bears Stadium	29,043	Recap
11	Bye						
12	November 19	Miami Dolphins	**W** 31–17	8–1	Oakland–Alameda County Coliseum	37,295	Recap
13	November 23	at **Kansas City Chiefs**	**W** 44–22	9–1	Municipal Stadium	44,020	Recap
14	December 3	at **San Diego Chargers**	**W** 41–21	10–1	San Diego Stadium	53,474	Recap
15	December 10	at Houston Oilers	**W** 19–7	11–1	Rice Stadium	36,375	Recap
16	December 17	New York Jets	**W** 38–29	12–1	Oakland–Alameda County Coliseum	53,011	Recap
17	December 24	Buffalo Bills	**W** 28–21	13–1	Oakland–Alameda County Coliseum	30,738	Recap
Note: Intra-division opponents are in **bold** text.

== Postseason ==
Round	Date	Opponent	Result	Venue	Attendance	Game recap
AFL Championship	December 31	Houston Oilers	W 40–7	Oakland–Alameda County Coliseum	53,330	Recap
Super Bowl II	January 14, 1968	Green Bay Packers	L 14–33	Miami Orange Bowl	75,546	Recap

== Standings ==
AFL Western Division
	W	L	T	PCT	DIV	PF	PA	STK
Oakland Raiders	13	1	0	.929	6–0	468	233	W10
Kansas City Chiefs	9	5	0	.643	2–4	408	254	W3
San Diego Chargers	8	5	1	.615	4–2	360	352	L4
Denver Broncos	3	11	0	.214	0–6	256	409	L1

Note: Tie games were not officially counted in the standings in the AFL.

== Game summaries ==
=== Week 1 vs Broncos ===
Week One: Denver Broncos (1–0) at Oakland Raiders (0–0)

Quarter	1	2	3	4	Total
Broncos	0	0	0	0	0
Raiders	7	13	14	17	51

at Oakland-Alameda County Coliseum • Oakland, California

- Date: September 10
- Game weather: 66 °F (19 °C) • Wind 10 miles per hour (16 km/h; 8.7 kn)
- Game attendance: 25,423
- Pro-Football-Reference.com

Game information

Broncos

- Steve Tensi
  2/12, 17 Yds, INT
- Bo Hickey
  2 Rush, 13 Yds
- Wendell Hayes
  1 Rec, 19 Yds

Raiders

- Daryle Lamonica
  8/14, 118 Yds, TD, INT
- Clem Daniels
  14 Rush, 69 Yds, TD
- Warren Wells
  2 Rec, 96 Yds, TD

With only one game played during the AFL's opening week, the Raiders' season began on September 10, 1967, with a 51–0 wipeout of the Denver Broncos in front of a home crowd of just more than 25,000. Running back Hewritt Dixon caught one touchdown pass and ran for another. Warren Powers capped the scoring with a 36-yard interception return for a touchdown.

Scoring summary

Quarter	Time	Drive			Team	Scoring information	Score	
Quarter	Time	Plays	Yards	TOP	Team	Scoring information	DEN	OAK
1					Raiders	Hewritt Dixon 3-yard touchdown run, George Blanda kick good	0	7
2					Raiders	Daryle Lamonica 4-yard touchdown run, George Blanda kick no good	0	13
2					Raiders	Hewritt Dixon 10-yard touchdown reception from Daryle Lamonica, George Blanda kick good	0	20
3					Raiders	Clem Daniels 6-yard touchdown run, George Blanda kick good	0	27
3					Raiders	Rod Sherman 13-yard touchdown run, George Blanda kick good	0	34
4					Raiders	23-yard field goal by George Blanda	0	37
4					Raiders	Warren Wells 50-yard touchdown reception from George Blanda, George Blanda kick good	0	44
4					Raiders	Interception returned 36 yards for touchdown by Warren Powers, George Blanda kick good	0	51
"TOP" = time of possession. For other American football terms, see Glossary of American football.							0	51

=== Week 2 ===
Team	1	2	3	4	Total
Patriots	7	0	0	0	7
• Raiders	7	14	14	0	35

- Date: September 17

Newly acquired quarterback Daryle Lamonica threw three touchdowns and ran for another as Oakland's high-powered offense easily handled the Boston Patriots. Former Raiders quarterback Babe Parilli connected with Art Graham on a 19-yard touchdown pass for Boston's only score.

=== Week 3 ===
Team	1	2	3	4	Total
Chiefs	0	7	0	14	21
• Raiders	0	10	3	10	23

- Date: October 1

The Raiders stayed undefeated on the young season on the strength of two Daryle Lamonica touchdown passes and three field goals from 40-year-old George Blanda. A late touchdown run by Mike Garrett was not enough for Kansas City, who lost their first game of the season.

=== Week 4 ===
Team	1	2	3	4	Total
Raiders	0	0	7	7	14
• Jets	7	10	3	7	27

- Date: October 7

In front of a crowd of more than 63,000 at Shea Stadium, the New York Jets spoiled Oakland's perfect season. New York's running game provided three touchdowns—two by Emerson Boozer and one by Bill Mathis. Daryle Lamonica connected with Bill Miller and Warren Wells for two second-half touchdowns.

=== Week 5 ===
Team	1	2	3	4	Total
• Raiders	0	17	0	7	24
Bills	7	0	7	6	20

- Date: October 15

Oakland rebounded from the previous week's defeat by edging the Buffalo Bills in War Memorial Stadium. The Raiders built a 17–7 halftime lead on a George Blanda field goal, a Fred Biletnikoff touchdown catch, and a 30-yard interception return for a touchdown by Dan Conners. Daryle Lamonica found Billy Cannon for a 3-yard touchdown in the fourth quarter, which provided the margin of victory.

=== Week 6 ===
Team	1	2	3	4	Total
• Raiders	14	6	7	21	48
Patriots	0	0	7	7	14

- Date: October 22

In a week 3 rematch at Fenway Park the Raiders once again easily defeated the Patriots. Daryle Lamonica threw for four touchdowns, while George Blanda accounted for one touchdown pass and two field goals. Roger Hagberg caught one touchdown and ran for another for Oakland.

=== Week 7 ===
Team	1	2	3	4	Total
Chargers	0	10	0	0	10
• Raiders	9	7	14	21	51

- Date: October 29

Oakland broke the 50-point mark for the second time in 1967, as the Raiders crushed the San Diego Chargers in their first meeting of the season. Daryle Lamonica and George Blanda combined for three touchdown passes, while Lamonica ran for two more scores. Lance Alworth caught a 71-yard touchdown for the Chargers.

=== Week 8 ===
Team	1	2	3	4	Total
• Raiders	3	15	3	0	21
Broncos	0	7	0	10	17

- Date: November 5

Oakland held off a late comeback by the Broncos to preserve a narrow victory at Bears Stadium. The Raiders built an 18–7 halftime lead on the strength of two touchdown receptions by Bill Miller, but could only manage one field goal in the second half. Jim LeClair ran for a 1-yard Denver touchdown in the final period.

=== Week 9 ===
Team	1	2	3	4	Total
Dolphins	3	7	0	7	17
• Raiders	0	7	7	17	31

- Date: November 19

The Raiders scored 17 points in the final period to pull away from the expansion Miami Dolphins. Daryle Lamonica connected with Billy Cannon for three scores, while Clem Daniels ran for another. Bob Griese threw a 5-yard touchdown pass to tight end Doug Moreau in the second quarter to give the Dolphins a three-point lead at halftime.

=== Week 10 ===
Team	1	2	3	4	Total
• Raiders	17	6	7	14	44
Chiefs	10	0	2	10	22

- Date: November 23

Oakland improved to 9–1 by doubling up on the Chiefs in front of more than 44,000 in Municipal Stadium. Five different Raiders (Fred Biletnikoff, Willie Brown, Pete Banaszak, Warren Powers, and Larry Todd) scored touchdowns, while the Chiefs got touchdown receptions from Frank Pitts and Otis Taylor.

=== Week 11 ===
Team	1	2	3	4	Total
• Raiders	17	14	7	3	41
Chargers	7	14	0	0	21

- Date: December 3

The Raiders' offense continued to pile up points on the season, as Daryle Lamonica threw for four more touchdowns. Billy Cannon caught two, while Bill Miller and Fred Biletnikoff caught one each. Charger quarterback John Hadl passed for two scores and ran for another.

=== Week 12 ===
Team	1	2	3	4	Total
• Raiders	0	0	3	16	19
Oilers	0	7	0	0	7

- Date: December 10

Four George Blanda field goals and a 27-yard touchdown run by Hewritt Dixon lifted Oakland to its eleventh win of the season, while the Raiders defense held the Houston Oilers to just one touchdown. The game was played at Rice Stadium.

=== Week 13 ===
Team	1	2	3	4	Total
Jets	7	7	0	15	29
• Raiders	3	7	14	14	38

- Date: December 17

The Raiders avenged their only loss of the season in front of a home crowd of 53,011. The Jets scored first on a 28-yard pass from Joe Namath to Don Maynard. Daryle Lamonica threw for three touchdowns, while Roger Hagberg and Hewritt Dixon ran for one touchdown each.

=== Week 14 ===
Team	1	2	3	4	Total
Bills	10	0	3	8	21
• Raiders	7	7	7	7	28

- Date: December 24
- Location: Oakland–Alameda County Coliseum

A 6-yard touchdown run by Hewritt Dixon broke a 21–21 tie in the fourth quarter, as the Raiders edged the Bills to end their regular season with a 13–1 mark, the best in franchise history. The Oakland defense capitalized on Buffalo turnovers, converting two fumble recoveries into touchdowns in the second and third quarters. Daryle Lamonica found Billy Cannon for a 23-yard touchdown pass in the first period.

== Regular season team statistics ==
In the 1967 regular season, the defense led the league with 67 sacks and 665 yards lost, the latter still an all-time record, the Raiders leading the league in sacks from 1966 to 1968, also an all-time record.

== Postseason ==
With a 13–1 record, the Raiders captured their first AFL Western Division title and advanced to the 1967 AFL Championship against the Eastern Division champion Houston Oilers. Oakland edged Houston in a week 15 matchup on December 10. By virtue of the game's annual rotation, the game was played in Oakland.

=== AFL championship game ===
Team	1	2	3	4	Total
Oilers	0	0	0	7	7
• Raiders	3	14	10	13	40

- Date: December 31
- Location: Oakland–Alameda County Coliseum, Oakland, California
- Game weather: 45 °F (7 °C) • Wind 3 mph
t

Scoring summary
1	OAK	George Blanda 37 yard field goal	Raiders 3–0
2	OAK	Hewritt Dixon 69 yard run (George Blanda kick)	Raiders 10–0
2	OAK	Dave Kocourek 17 yard pass from Daryle Lamonica (George Blanda kick)	Raiders 17–0
3	OAK	Daryle Lamonica 1 yard run (George Blanda kick)	Raiders 24–0
3	OAK	George Blanda 40 yard field goal	Raiders 27–0
4	OAK	George Blanda 42 yard field goal	Raiders 30–0
4	HOU	Charley Frazier 5 yard pass from Pete Beathard (John Wittenborn kick)	Raiders 30–7
4	OAK	George Blanda 36 yard field goal	Raiders 33–7
4	OAK	Bill Miller 12 yard pass from Daryle Lamonica (George Blanda kick)	Raiders 40–7

Raiders went to Super Bowl II but lost to the Packers 33-14.

=== Super Bowl II ===
Team	1	2	3	4	Total
• Packers	3	13	10	7	33
Raiders	0	7	0	7	14

- Date: January 14
- Location: Orange Bowl, Miami, Florida

==== Scoring summary ====
- GB – FG Chandler 39
- GB – FG Chandler 20
- GB – Dowler 62 pass from Starr (Chandler kick)
- OAK – Miller 23 pass from Lamonica (Blanda kick)
- GB – FG Chandler 43
- GB – Anderson 2 run (Chandler kick)
- GB – FG Chandler 31
- GB – Adderley 60 interception return (Chandler kick)
- OAK – Miller 23 pass from Lamonica (Blanda kick)

Raiders lost and in 1968 finished 12-2 win to the Kansas City Chiefs 41-6. But lost to the New York Jets in the AFL Championship 27-23.

== See also ==
- NFL team records

Preceded by Kansas City Chiefs; 1966	American Football League champion 1967	Succeeded by New York Jets; 1968
