= Bob Print =

American football player (1944–2025)

No. 57
- Position: Linebacker

Personal information
- Born: January 16, 1944; Euclid, Ohio, U.S.
- Died: September 28, 2025 (aged 81); Cleveland, Ohio, U.S.
- Listed height: 6 ft 0 in (1.83 m)
- Listed weight: 230 lb (104 kg)

Career information
- High school: St. Joseph (Cleveland)
- College: Dayton (1962–1966)
- NFL draft: 1967: undrafted

Career history
- San Diego Chargers (1967–1968); Cincinnati Bengals (1969)*; Edmonton Eskimos (1969); Cleveland Browns (1970)*
- * Offseason or practice squad member only

Career AFL statistics
- Games played: 15
- Stats at Pro Football Reference

Robert Thomas Print (January 16, 1944 – September 28, 2025) was an American professional football player who was a linebacker for the San Diego Chargers of the American Football League (AFL). He played college football for the Dayton Flyers as an end, then guard, then defensive end. After college, he signed with the Chargers as an undrafted free agent in 1967. Print made the team as a rookie and appeared in 15 games across two seasons in the AFL. He also appeared in one game for the Edmonton Eskimos of the Canadian Football League (CFL) and had brief stints with the Cincinnati Bengals and Cleveland Browns.

== Early life ==
Print was born on January 16, 1944, in Euclid, Ohio. He grew up competing in football, wrestling and basketball. He attended St. Joseph's Academy in Cleveland, where he played high school football as a fullback and flanker. He was named to The Cleveland Press All-Scholastic team as a senior in 1961 and graduated in 1962.

== College career ==
Print attended the University of Dayton from 1962 to 1966. Initially an end, he served as team captain for Dayton's freshman team in 1962. He was moved to guard in 1963 and made the varsity team. However, he suffered a season-ending ligament injury after appearing in only one game; he was granted an extra year of eligibility due to the lost season. Print received varsity letters from 1964 to 1966, playing as a defensive end in 1964 before playing as a two-way end in 1965.

After undergoing a weight training program, Print had his best year as a defensive end in 1966. He weighed 223 pounds (101 kg) during the season, up from 175 pounds (79 kg) he had weighed during his high school career. Print recalled that "I was more of a flanker back then and I all did was catch passes. I think I'm more suited for defense. Offense is just blocking and catching passes. On defense you get to knock people down. It feels good." His 1966 season included one game against Northern Michigan where he posted 18 tackles. During his collegiate career, he was twice selected a Tri-State All-American.

== Professional career ==
After going unselected in the 1967 NFL/AFL draft, Print signed with the San Diego Chargers of the American Football League (AFL) as an undrafted free agent. With the Chargers, he was moved to linebacker. He impressed the team with his aggressiveness and hard hitting and made the final roster. Print appeared in seven games during the 1967 season as a backup before being placed on the practice squad to conclude the season. He was limited by an injury sustained in preseason in 1968 but managed to appear in eight games, one as a starter, for the Chargers. Print was waived by the Chargers early in 1969 and then claimed off waivers by the Cincinnati Bengals, before he made the surprising decision to leave the team in training camp due to personal issues.

In September 1969, Print signed with the Edmonton Eskimos of the Canadian Football League (CFL). The Edmonton Journal reported that he had the reputation for "being an animal", "the highest recommendation a linebacker can receive". He appeared in one game before being released a week after his signing. He later had a brief stint with the Cleveland Browns in the NFL in 1970 to conclude his career. He finished his career with 15 AFL games played and one CFL game played.

== Later life and death ==
Outside of sports, Print worked as a landscaper. He was also a golfer and served as president of the St. Clair Golf Association traveling league. With his wife, June, Print had two children. He lived in Timberlake, Ohio, and died in Cleveland on September 28, 2025, at the age of 81.
