= NFL 100 Greatest Teams =

Selection of American football teams

The National Football League (NFL) 100 Greatest Teams was voted on by a panel consisting of media members, former players and league personnel in 2019 to honor the greatest teams of the first 100 years of the NFL.

== Selection process ==
The teams were chosen by a panel of 26 voters—coaches, team and front office executives, former players and members of the media—between April and June 2018. New England Patriots head coach Bill Belichick and Pro Football Hall of Fame head coach and former color commentator John Madden, both voters, were in charge of looking over film and issuing a report to the committee on players in the early years of the league.

The teams were unveiled over six weeks on NFL Network by host Rich Eisen alongside Cris Collinsworth from NBC Sports and Belichick.

== NFL 100 Greatest Teams ==
Rank	Years	Record	Win %	Playoff result
1	1972 Miami Dolphins	14–0	1.000	Won Super Bowl VII
2	1985 Chicago Bears	15–1	.938	Won Super Bowl XX
3	1978 Pittsburgh Steelers	14–2	.875	Won Super Bowl XIII
4	1984 San Francisco 49ers	15–1	.938	Won Super Bowl XIX
5	1989 San Francisco 49ers	14–2	.875	Won Super Bowl XXIV
6	1992 Dallas Cowboys	13–3	.813	Won Super Bowl XXVII
7	2007 New England Patriots	16–0	1.000	Lost Super Bowl XLII
8	1976 Oakland Raiders	13–1	.929	Won Super Bowl XI
9	1962 Green Bay Packers	13–1	.929	Won NFL Championship Game
10	1975 Pittsburgh Steelers	12–2	.857	Won Super Bowl X
11	1999 St. Louis Rams	13–3	.813	Won Super Bowl XXXIV
12	1986 New York Giants	14–2	.875	Won Super Bowl XXI
13	1966 Green Bay Packers	12–2	.857	Won Super Bowl I
14	1998 Denver Broncos	14–2	.875	Won Super Bowl XXXIII
15	1991 Washington Redskins	14–2	.875	Won Super Bowl XXVI
16	2004 New England Patriots	14–2	.875	Won Super Bowl XXXIX
17	1977 Dallas Cowboys	12–2	.857	Won Super Bowl XII
18	2013 Seattle Seahawks	13–3	.813	Won Super Bowl XLVIII
19	1994 San Francisco 49ers	13–3	.813	Won Super Bowl XXIX
20	1996 Green Bay Packers	13–3	.813	Won Super Bowl XXXI
21	2016 New England Patriots	14–2	.875	Won Super Bowl LI
22	2000 Baltimore Ravens	12–4	.750	Won Super Bowl XXXV
23	1993 Dallas Cowboys	12–4	.750	Won Super Bowl XXVIII
24	1968 New York Jets	11–3	.786	Won Super Bowl III
25	1950 Cleveland Browns	10–2	.833	Won NFL Championship Game
26	1958 Baltimore Colts	9–3	.750	Won NFL Championship Game
27	1969 Kansas City Chiefs	11–3	.786	Won Super Bowl IV
28	1973 Miami Dolphins	12–2	.857	Won Super Bowl VIII
29	1990 New York Giants	13–3	.813	Won Super Bowl XXV
30	2009 New Orleans Saints	13–3	.813	Won Super Bowl XLIV
31	1981 San Francisco 49ers	13–3	.813	Won Super Bowl XVI
32	2003 New England Patriots	14–2	.875	Won Super Bowl XXXVIII
33	1983 Los Angeles Raiders	12–4	.750	Won Super Bowl XVIII
34	1971 Dallas Cowboys	11–3	.786	Won Super Bowl VI
35	1990 Buffalo Bills	13–3	.813	Lost Super Bowl XXV
36	2017 Philadelphia Eagles	13–3	.813	Won Super Bowl LII
37	2006 Indianapolis Colts	12–4	.750	Won Super Bowl XLI
38	1998 Minnesota Vikings	15–1	.938	Lost NFC Championship Game
39	1979 Pittsburgh Steelers	12–4	.750	Won Super Bowl XIV
40	1929 Green Bay Packers	12–0–1	.962	NFL champions
41	1964 Cleveland Browns	10–3–1	.750	Won NFL Championship Game
42	1948 Philadelphia Eagles	9–2–1	.792	Won NFL Championship Game
42	1949 Philadelphia Eagles	11–1	.917	Won NFL Championship Game
43	1974 Pittsburgh Steelers	10–3–1	.750	Won Super Bowl IX
44	1968 Baltimore Colts	13–1	.929	Lost Super Bowl III
45	2002 Tampa Bay Buccaneers	12–4	.750	Won Super Bowl XXXVII
46	2014 New England Patriots	12–4	.750	Won Super Bowl XLIX
47	1995 Dallas Cowboys	12–4	.750	Won Super Bowl XXX
48	1922 Canton Bulldogs	10–0–2	.917	NFL champions
48	1923 Canton Bulldogs	11–0–1	.958	NFL champions
49	1941 Chicago Bears	10–1	.909	Won NFL Championship Game
50	1997 Denver Broncos	12–4	.750	Won Super Bowl XXXII
51	2001 New England Patriots	11–5	.688	Won Super Bowl XXXVI
52	1960 Philadelphia Eagles	10–2	.833	Won NFL Championship Game
53	2007 New York Giants	10–6	.625	Won Super Bowl XLII
54	1982 Washington Redskins	8–1	.889	Won Super Bowl XVII
55	1953 Detroit Lions	10–2	.833	Won NFL Championship Game
56	1967 Green Bay Packers	9–4–1	.679	Won Super Bowl II
57	1936 Green Bay Packers	10–1–1	.875	Won NFL Championship Game
58	2015 Denver Broncos	12–4	.750	Won Super Bowl 50
59	1942 Chicago Bears	11–0	1.000	Lost NFL Championship Game
60	2001 St. Louis Rams	14–2	.875	Lost Super Bowl XXXVI
61	1963 Chicago Bears	11–1–2	.857	Won NFL Championship Game
62	2008 Pittsburgh Steelers	12–4	.750	Won Super Bowl XLIII
63	1984 Miami Dolphins	14–2	.875	Lost Super Bowl XIX
64	1954 Cleveland Browns	9–3	.750	Won NFL Championship Game
65	1987 Washington Redskins	11–4	.733	Won Super Bowl XXII
66	1933 Chicago Bears	10–2–1	.808	Won NFL Championship Game
67	2011 Green Bay Packers	15–1	.938	Lost NFC Divisional Game
68	2015 Carolina Panthers	15–1	.938	Lost Super Bowl 50
69	1988 San Francisco 49ers	10–6	.625	Won Super Bowl XXIII
70	1945 Cleveland Rams	9–1	.900	Won NFL Championship Game
71	1920 Akron Pros	8–0–3	.864	APFA champions
72	1970 Baltimore Colts	11–2–1	.821	Won Super Bowl V
73	1990 San Francisco 49ers	14–2	.875	Lost NFC Championship Game
74	1980 Oakland Raiders	11–5	.688	Won Super Bowl XV
75	2009 Indianapolis Colts	14–2	.875	Lost Super Bowl XLIV
76	1983 Washington Redskins	14–2	.875	Lost Super Bowl XVIII
77	1956 New York Giants	8–3–1	.833	Won NFL Championship Game
78	1967 Oakland Raiders	13–1	.929	Lost Super Bowl II
79	2018 New England Patriots	11–5	.688	Won Super Bowl LIII
80	1927 New York Giants	11–1–1	.885	NFL champions
81	1926 Frankford Yellow Jackets	14–1–2	.882	NFL champions
82	1921 Chicago Staleys	9–1–1	.864	APFA champions
83	1969 Minnesota Vikings	12–2	.857	Lost Super Bowl IV
84	1964 Buffalo Bills	12–2	.857	Won AFL Championship Game
85	1966 Kansas City Chiefs	11–2–1	.821	Lost Super Bowl I
86	2013 Denver Broncos	13–3	.813	Lost Super Bowl XLVIII
87	2010 Green Bay Packers	10–6	.625	Won Super Bowl XLV
88	1940 Chicago Bears	8–3	.727	Won NFL Championship Game
89	1934 Chicago Bears	13–0	1.000	Lost NFL Championship Game
90	2005 Pittsburgh Steelers	11–5	.688	Won Super Bowl XL
91	1999 Tennessee Titans	13–3	.813	Lost Super Bowl XXXIV
92	1951 Los Angeles Rams	8–4	.667	Won NFL Championship Game
93	2011 New York Giants	9–7	.563	Won Super Bowl XLVI
94	1978 Dallas Cowboys	12–4	.750	Lost Super Bowl XIII
95	2006 San Diego Chargers	14–2	.875	Lost AFC Divisional Game
96	1943 Chicago Bears	8–1–1	.850	Won NFL Championship Game
97	2012 Baltimore Ravens	10–6	.625	Won Super Bowl XLVII
98	1928 Providence Steam Roller	8–1–2	.818	NFL champions
99	1937 Washington Redskins	8–3	.727	Won NFL Championship Game
100	1961 Houston Oilers	10–3–1	.750	Won AFL Championship Game

=== Selections by franchise ===
Franchise	Apps.	Teams
Chicago Staleys / Bears	9	1921, 1933, 1934, 1940, 1941, 1942, 1943, 1963, 1985
Green Bay Packers	8	1929, 1936, 1962, 1966, 1967, 1996, 2010, 2011
New England Patriots	7	2001, 2003, 2004, 2007, 2014, 2016, 2018
Dallas Cowboys	6	1971, 1977, 1978, 1992, 1993, 1995
New York Giants	6	1927, 1956, 1986, 1990, 2007, 2011
Pittsburgh Steelers	6	1974, 1975, 1978, 1979, 2005, 2008
San Francisco 49ers	6	1981, 1984, 1988, 1989, 1990, 1994
Baltimore / Indianapolis Colts	5	1958, 1968, 1970, 2006, 2009
Washington Redskins	5	1937, 1982, 1983, 1987, 1991
Denver Broncos	4	1997, 1998, 2013, 2015
Cleveland / Los Angeles / St. Louis Rams	4	1945, 1951, 1999, 2001
Oakland / Los Angeles Raiders	4	1967, 1976, 1980, 1983
Philadelphia Eagles	4	1948, 1949, 1960, 2017
Cleveland Browns	3	1950, 1954, 1964
Miami Dolphins	3	1972, 1973, 1984
Baltimore Ravens	2	2000, 2012
Buffalo Bills	2	1964, 1990
Canton Bulldogs	2	1922, 1923
Houston Oilers / Tennessee Titans	2	1961, 1999
Kansas City Chiefs	2	1966, 1969
Minnesota Vikings	2	1969, 1998
Akron Pros	1	1920
Detroit Lions	1	1953
Frankford Yellow Jackets	1	1926
New York Jets	1	1968
Providence Steam Roller	1	1928
San Diego Chargers	1	2006
Seattle Seahawks	1	2013
Tampa Bay Buccaneers	1	2002
