= 1967 Denver Broncos season =

American football team season

- Owner: Gerald Phipps
- General manager: Lou Saban
- Head coach: Lou Saban
- Home stadium: Bears Stadium

Results
- Record: 3–11
- Division place: 4th AFL Western
- Playoffs: Did not qualify

The 1967 Denver Broncos season was the eighth season for the team in the American Football League (AFL). Led by first-year head coach and general manager Lou Saban, the Broncos posted a record of three wins and eleven losses, last in the AFL's Western division. Running back Floyd Little, a first round draft choice (sixth overall), was team captain in his rookie season. After an opening win at home, the Broncos lost nine straight games, then split the last four.

Inter-league play between the AFL and NFL in the exhibition season began this year. In the first matchup on August 5, the Broncos defeated the Detroit Lions 13–7 and became the first AFL team to beat an NFL team.

Before the season, the Broncos changed from orange helmets to blue helmets.

This was the first season that the Broncos wore their now famous "Orange Crush" uniforms, but the famous D logo on the helmets was not introduced until the next season. The team made slight modifications to the uniforms until they were retired 30 years later, after the 1996 season. The Orange Crush uniforms returned in 2024, albeit in a slightly different design, retaining the helmet design from the 1997 uniforms (but retiring the '97 uniforms all together), along with the 1977 uniforms as a throwback.

Hired in December 1966, Saban left the University of Maryland after just one season; he had previously been an AFL head coach at Boston and Buffalo, where he won consecutive AFL titles.

== Personnel ==
=== Staff ===
1967 Denver Broncos staff
Front office: Chairman of the Board – Gerald Phipps; President – Allan R Phipps; Director of Player Personnel – Fred Gehrke; Head coaches: General Manager/Head Coach – Lou Saban; Offensive coaches: Offensive Backfield – Hunter Enis; Offensive Receivers – Sam Rutigliano; Offensive Line – Whitey Dovell	Defensive coaches: Defensive Line – Stan Jones; Defensive Backfield – Dick MacPherson

=== Roster ===
1967 Denver Broncos roster
Quarterbacks (QB): 10 Jim LeClair; 13 Steve Tensi; Running backs (RB): 27 Charley Mitchell; 32 Mike Kellogg; 33 Wendell Hayes; 44 Floyd Little; Wide receivers (WR): 41 Eric Crabtree; 49 Neal Sweeney; 82 Bob Scarpitto P; 88 Al Denson; Tight ends (TE): 85 Tom Beer; 89 Andre White	Offensive linemen (OL): 56 Dave Behrman C; 59 Larry Kaminski C; 60 Ernie Park G; 64 Sam Brunelli T; 67 George Goeddeke LG; 73 Pat Matson G; 78 Tom Cichowski T; Defensive linemen (DL): 55 Pete Duranko DE; 62 Jerry Inman DT; 63 Dave Costa DT; 66 Larry Cox DE; 75 Rex Mirich; 77 Bob Young G; 87 Rich Jackson DE	Linebackers (LB): 50 Carl Cunningham OLB; 51 Henry Sorrell OLB; 54 Chip Myrtle OLB; 57 John Huard MLB; 58 Frank Richter OLB; Defensive backs (DB): 21 Goldie Sellers CB; 22 Lonnie Wright SS/FS; 25 Errol Prisby CB/S; 28 Jack Lentz FS; 43 Pete Jaquess CB; 45 Tom Cassese SS; 46 Jim Summers CB; 48 Nemiah Wilson CB; Special teams (ST): 2 Bob Humphreys K	Practice squad: 71 Mike Current T; 3 Rick Duncan K; 17 Scotty Glacken QB; -- Errol Mann K; 70 Don Smith G; 72 Dick Tyson G; Reserve: 84 Lou Andrus LB Military; 34 Cookie Gilchrist RB (IR); 31 Bo Hickey RB (IR); 51 Gene Jeter LB (IR); 53 Roger LeClerc (IR); 81 Max Leetzow DE (IR); 22 Fran Lynch RB Military; 22 Bobby Ply S (IR); Rookies in italics

== Regular season ==
=== Schedule ===
Week	Date	Opponent	Result	Record	Venue	Attendance	Recap
1	September 3	Boston Patriots	**W** 26–21	1–0	Bears Stadium	35,488	Recap
2	September 10	at **Oakland Raiders**	**L** 0–51	1–1	Oakland–Alameda County Coliseum	25,423	Recap
3	September 17	at Miami Dolphins	**L** 21–35	1–2	Orange Bowl	29,381	Recap
4	September 24	New York Jets	**L** 24–38	1–3	Bears Stadium	35,365	Recap
5	October 1	at Houston Oilers	**L** 6–10	1–4	Rice Stadium	21,798	Recap
6	October 8	Buffalo Bills	**L** 16–17	1–5	Bears Stadium	35,188	Recap
7	Bye						
8	October 22	**San Diego Chargers**	**L** 21–38	1–6	Bears Stadium	34,464	Recap
9	October 29	at **Kansas City Chiefs**	**L** 9–52	1–7	Municipal Stadium	44,002	Recap
10	November 5	**Oakland Raiders**	**L** 17–21	1–8	Bears Stadium	29,043	Recap
11	November 12	Houston Oilers	**L** 18–20	1–9	Bears Stadium	30,392	Recap
12	November 19	at Buffalo Bills	**W** 21–20	2–9	War Memorial Stadium	30,891	Recap
13	November 23	at **San Diego Chargers**	**L** 20–24	2–10	San Diego Stadium	34,586	Recap
14	December 3	at New York Jets	**W** 33–24	3–10	Shea Stadium	61,615	Recap
15	Bye						
16	December 17	**Kansas City Chiefs**	**L** 24–38	3–11	Bears Stadium	31,660	Recap
17	Bye						
Note: Intra-division opponents are in **bold** text.

- Thursday (November 23: Thanksgiving)
- With the expansion Miami Dolphins joining the AFL in 1966, there were an odd-number (9)
  of teams for two seasons, resulting in multiple bye weeks for each team.

=== Game summaries ===
==== Week 14 ====
Team	1	2	3	4	Total
• Chiefs	14	14	7	3	38
Broncos	0	7	10	7	24

- Date: December 17
- Location: Bears Stadium

=== Standings ===
AFL Western Division
	W	L	T	PCT	DIV	PF	PA	STK
Oakland Raiders	13	1	0	.929	6–0	468	233	W10
Kansas City Chiefs	9	5	0	.643	2–4	408	254	W3
San Diego Chargers	8	5	1	.615	4–2	360	352	L4
Denver Broncos	3	11	0	.214	0–6	256	409	L1

Note: Tie games were not officially counted in the standings in the AFL.
