= Chip Myrtle =

American football player (1945–2022)

No. 54, 89, 53
- Position: Linebacker

Personal information
- Born: February 6, 1945; Buffalo, New York, U.S.
- Died: April 11, 2022 (aged 77); Centennial, Colorado, U.S.
- Listed height: 6 ft 2 in (1.88 m)
- Listed weight: 225 lb (102 kg)

Career information
- High school: Archbishop Carroll (Washington, D.C.)
- College: Maryland
- NFL draft: 1967: undrafted

Career history
- Denver Broncos (1967-1972); San Diego Chargers (1974); Jacksonville Express (1975)

Career NFL/AFL statistics
- Fumble recoveries: 7
- Interceptions: 4
- Sacks: 9.5
- Stats at Pro Football Reference

Charles Joseph (Chip) Myrtle III (February 6, 1945 – April 11, 2022) was an American professional football player who was a linebacker for seven seasons for the Denver Broncos and the San Diego Chargers. His final season of pro football came in 1975 as a Jacksonville Express of the World Football League member.
