= Harold Akin =

American football player (1945–2022)

No. 71
- Position: Offensive tackle

Personal information
- Born: January 11, 1945; McAlester, Oklahoma, U.S.
- Died: March 18, 2022 (aged 77); Oklahoma City, Oklahoma, U.S.
- Listed height: 6 ft 5 in (1.96 m)
- Listed weight: 260 lb (118 kg)

Career information
- High school: Putnam City (OK)
- College: Oklahoma State
- NFL draft: 1967: 3rd round, 67th overall pick

Career history
- San Diego Chargers (1967–1968)

Career AFL statistics
- Games played: 13
- Starts: 0
- Stats at Pro Football Reference

Harold Dwayne "Horse" Akin (January 11, 1945 – March 18, 2022) was an American football player. An offensive tackle, he played college football at Oklahoma State University, and played professionally in the American Football League (AFL) for the San Diego Chargers in 1967 and 1968.

Akin later went on to found The Budget Floor Store in Oklahoma City, which now has 4 locations across Oklahoma.

== See also ==
- List of American Football League players
