= Dave Conway =

American football player (1945–2008)

- Conway in 1972

No. 35
- Positions: Placekicker, Punter

Personal information
- Born: January 6, 1945; Baytown, Texas
- Died: January 22, 2008 (aged 63)
- Listed height: 6 ft 1 in (1.85 m)
- Listed weight: 200 lb (91 kg)

Career information
- High school: Robert E. Lee
- College: Texas
- NFL draft: 1967: 7th round, 173rd overall pick

Career history
- San Diego Chargers* (1967-1968); Dallas Cowboys* (1971); Green Bay Packers (1971); Atlanta Falcons* (1972)
- * Offseason or practice squad member only

Awards and highlights
- All-Southwest Conference - 1966; 1965 Orange Bowl Champion; 1967 Bluebonnet Bowl Champion
- Stats at Pro Football Reference

David Alexander Conway Jr. (January 6, 1945 – January 22, 2008) was an American football placekicker and punter who played college football at the University of Texas in the 1960's and played in one game for the Green Bay Packers in the National Football League (NFL) in 1971.

He holds the NFL record for most extra points made per game (5) and shares the record for most extra points attempted per game (5).

== Early life ==
Conway was born and raised in Baytown, Texas where he played jr. High and High School Football. In 1959, he led all Baytown Jr. High football players in scoring. At Baytown High School he played punter, kicker and quarterback for the football team and also ran track.

== College career ==
Conway played college football at Texas from 1964-66, where he was a 3 year starter at kicker and 1 year starter at punter, but had been recruited as a quarterback.

In 1963 he was on the freshman team.

In 1964 he went 7-12 on FGs and 24-24 on PATs and helped the Horns go 10-1, win the Orange Bowl and finish ranked #5 after spending 3 weeks ranked #1. He scored the 2nd most points on the team and the 4th most kicking point in the Country. He also had 2 punts and 3 tackles. He tied Tony Crosby's school record for highest extra point percentage (100%) - both of whom went 24 for 24. Billy Schott would match it, but with more PATs, in 1972.

In 1965 he led the team in scoring going 8-16 on FGs and 21-24 on PATs and was also the team's primary punter, kicking 52 punts for 2,253 yards total on a team that went 6-4. He set the then school-record for punting average with 43.3 yards/punt and finished 5th in the country for punting average. He finished 9th in the nation in kicking scoring. He also had 3 rushes for 25 yards, including one scramble for 20 yards, and a pass attempt.

In 1966 he again led the team in scoring, going 8-13 on FGs, including a career long and school-record 52 yarder, and 17-19 on PATs on a team that won the Bluebonnet Bowl. Bill Bradley took over primary punting duties, but Conway still had 8 punts for 315 yards as well as 3 tackles. At the end of the season he was name All-Southwest Conference as a kicking specialist.

He graduated holding the conference record for kicking points, with 131, and the school record for highest punting average in a career with 41.97 yards/punt, still 6th best in school history. His punting records were eventually topped by Russell Erxleben in the 1970's.

== Professional career ==
Conway was drafted in the 7th round of the 1967 NFL draft by the San Diego Chargers (173rd overall), but was cut by them in August of 1967.

He preceded to bounce around the NFL spending time with the Broncos later in 1967 and then trying out for the Chargers again in 1968.

In 1971 he was signed as a free agent the Dallas Cowboys. He hit 2 of 3 FGs, both 49 yards, for them in the preseason and was waived, but then picked up by the Green Bay Packers for whom he went 4 for 4 in the preseason which earned him a spot on the roster. He played his one and only game with them on September 19th - a wild one against the Giants in which Green Bay's coach Dan Devine had his leg broken. He went 5 for 5 on XPs, but missed his one FG attempt that would've won them the game. He was cut 3 days later.

In February 1972, he was signed by the Atlanta Falcons, but was cut during camp.
