= Richard Sligh =

American football player (1944–1998)

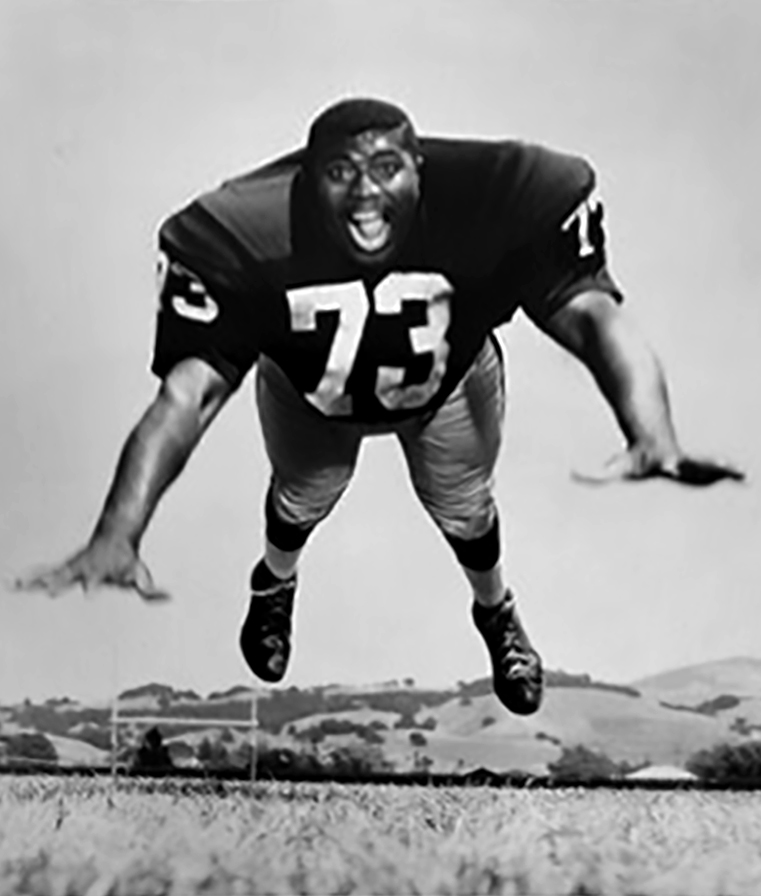
- Sligh in 1967

No. 73
- Position: Defensive tackle

Personal information
- Born: August 18, 1944; Newberry, South Carolina, U.S.
- Died: December 23, 1998 (aged 54); Roxboro, North Carolina, U.S.
- Listed height: 7 ft 0 in (2.13 m)
- Listed weight: 300 lb (136 kg)

Career information
- High school: Gallman (Newberry, South Carolina)
- College: North Carolina College (1962–1966)
- AFL draft: 1967: 10th round, 253rd overall pick

Career history
- Oakland Raiders (1967)

Awards and highlights
- AFL champion (1967)

Career statistics
- Games played: 8
- Games started: 0
- Stats at Pro Football Reference

Richard Ellis Sligh (August 18, 1944 – December 23, 1998) was an American professional football defensive tackle who played for the Oakland Raiders of the American Football League (AFL). At 7 ft 0 in, Sligh is the tallest player in professional American football history.

== Football career ==
Sligh graduated from Gallman High School in Newberry, South Carolina and played college football at North Carolina Central University, where he was on Dean's List, for high academic achievement, as well as having a Biology Major and Chemistry Minor from 1962 to 1966.

He was chosen 253rd overall in the 10th round of the 1967 NFL/AFL draft as a defensive tackle.

During his time in the league he played in a total of eight games. Sligh was a reserve for the Oakland Raiders in Super Bowl II, when the Raiders fell to the Green Bay Packers. In 1968, he was chosen by the expansion Cincinnati Bengals in the AFL Allocation Draft, but he was waived prior to the regular season.

=== Height ===
At 7 ft 0 in, Sligh is the tallest player in professional American football history. The next tallest are Matt O'Donnell at 6 ft 11 in, Morris Stroud at 6 ft 10 in, and Dan Skipper at 6 ft 10 in.

== See also ==
- List of American Football League players
