= 1967 Kansas City Chiefs season =

NFL team season

- Owner: Lamar Hunt
- General manager: Jack Steadman
- Head coach: Hank Stram
- Home stadium: Municipal Stadium

Results
- Record: 9–5
- Division place: 2nd AFL Western
- Playoffs: Did not qualify
- AFL All-Stars: QB Len Dawson; RB Mike Garrett; FB Curtis McClinton; TE Fred Arbanas; G Ed Budde; DT Buck Buchanan; DE Jerry Mays; LB Sherrill Headrick; S Johnny Robinson

The 1967 Kansas City Chiefs season was the eighth season for the Kansas City Chiefs as a professional AFL franchise, and fifth in Kansas City. Despite their AFL championship win and an appearance in the inaugural AFL-NFL championship game (Super Bowl I) the previous year, the Chiefs did not advance to the postseason (AFL championship game).

The club’s special teams got a boost with the addition of kicker Jan Stenerud from Montana State and kick returner Noland “Super Gnat” Smith from Tennessee State. The seating capacity at Municipal Stadium was increased from 40,000 to 47,000 due to demand. In June, Jackson County voters approved a $43 million bond issue for construction of a sports complex to be completed by 1972.

The Chiefs' first non-playoff game against an NFL team resulted in a commanding 66–24 preseason victory over the Chicago Bears at Municipal Stadium on August 23. Injuries again hit the club hard during the regular season as the Chiefs clawed their way to a 9–5 record, four games behind the division-winning Oakland Raiders (13–1).

== Offseason ==
=== Draft ===
1967 Kansas City Chiefs draft
| Round | Pick | Player | Position | College | Notes |
| 1 | 24 | Gene Trosch | Defensive tackle | Miami (FL) | |
| 2 | 47 | Jim Lynch * | Linebacker | Notre Dame | |
| 2 | 50 | Willie Lanier * ^{†} | Linebacker | Morgan State | |
| 3 | 77 | Billy Masters | Tight end | LSU | |
| 4 | 104 | Ron Zwernemann | Guard | East Texas State | |
| 6 | 156 | Noland Smith | Wide receiver | Tennessee State | |
| 7 | 183 | Dick Erickson | Center | Stout State | |
Made roster † Pro Football Hall of Fame * Made at least one Pro Bowl during career

== Roster ==
1967 Kansas City Chiefs roster
| Quarterbacks (QB): 16 Len Dawson; 11 Jacky Lee; Running backs (RB): 23 Bert Coan; 21 Mike Garrett; 32 Curtis McClinton; 45 Gene Thomas; Wide receivers (WR): 88 Chris Burford; 25 Frank Pitts; 30 Gloster Richardson; 1 Noland Smith; 89 Otis Taylor; Tight ends (TE): 84 Fred Arbanas; 80 Reggie Carolan | Offensive linemen (OL): 61 Dennis Biodrowski G; 71 Ed Budde G; 72 Tony DiMidio T; 66 Wayne Frazier C; 73 Dave Hill T; 54 Mike Hudock C; 70 Bob Kelly T; 64 Curt Merz G; 60 Al Reynolds G; 77 Jim Tyrer T; Defensive linemen (DL): 86 Buck Buchanan DT; 85 Chuck Hurston DE; 99 Ernie Ladd DT; 82 Ed Lothamer DT; 75 Jerry Mays DE; 74 Gene Trosch DE | Linebackers (LB): 52 Bud Abell OLB; 78 Bobby Bell OLB; 69 Sherrill Headrick OLB; 51 Jim Lynch MLB; Defensive backs (DB): 20 Bobby Hunt SS; 46 Jim Kearney CB; 48 Sam Longmire CB/S; 22 Willie Mitchell CB; 42 Johnny Robinson FS; 17 Fletcher Smith CB; 18 Emmitt Thomas CB; 24 Fred Williamson CB; Special teams (ST): 3 Jan Stenerud K; 44 Jerrel Wilson P | Practice squad: 24 Caesar Belser S; 79 Al Dotson DT; 62 Ray Kubala T; 68 Wayne Walker P; Reserve: 87 Aaron Brown DE (IR); 65 Jon Gilliam C (IR); 55 E. J. Holub LB (IR); 63 Willie Lanier LB (IR); Rookies in italics |

== Preseason ==
| Week | Date | Opponent | Result | Record | Venue | Attendance | Recap |
|---|---|---|---|---|---|---|---|
| 1 | August 5 | at Houston Oilers | W 24–9 | 1–0 | Rice Stadium | 36,632 | Recap |
| 2 | August 12 | vs. New York Jets | W 30–17 | 2–0 | Legion Field (Birmingham, AL) | 53,109 | Recap |
| 3 | August 19 | vs. Oakland Raiders | W 48–0 | 3–0 | Civic Stadium (Portland, OR) | 13,352 | Recap |
| 4 | August 23 | Chicago Bears | W 66–24 | 4–0 | Municipal Stadium | 33,041 | Recap |
| 5 | September 1 | at Los Angeles Rams | L 24–44 | 4–1 | Los Angeles Memorial Coliseum | 73,990 | Recap |

== Regular season ==
=== Schedule ===
| Week | Date | Opponent | Result | Record | Venue | Attendance | Recap |
|---|---|---|---|---|---|---|---|
| 1 | Bye | | | | | | |
| 2 | September 9 | at Houston Oilers | **W** 25–20 | 1–0 | Rice Stadium | 28,003 | Recap |
| 3 | Bye | | | | | | |
| 4 | September 24 | at Miami Dolphins | **W** 24–0 | 2–0 | Miami Orange Bowl | 36,272 | Recap |
| 5 | October 1 | at **Oakland Raiders** | **L** 21–23 | 2–1 | Oakland–Alameda County Coliseum | 50,268 | Recap |
| 6 | October 8 | Miami Dolphins | **W** 41–0 | 3–1 | Municipal Stadium | 45,291 | Recap |
| 7 | October 15 | at **San Diego Chargers** | **L** 31–45 | 3–2 | San Diego Stadium | 43,355 | Recap |
| 8 | October 22 | Houston Oilers | **L** 19–24 | 3–3 | Municipal Stadium | 46,365 | Recap |
| 9 | October 29 | **Denver Broncos** | **W** 52–9 | 4–3 | Municipal Stadium | 44,002 | Recap |
| 10 | November 5 | New York Jets | **W** 42–18 | 5–3 | Municipal Stadium | 46,642 | Recap |
| 11 | November 12 | at Boston Patriots | **W** 33–10 | 6–3 | Fenway Park | 23,010 | Recap |
| 12 | November 19 | **San Diego Chargers** | **L** 16–17 | 6–4 | Municipal Stadium | 46,738 | Recap |
| 13 | November 23 | **Oakland Raiders** | **L** 22–44 | 6–5 | Municipal Stadium | 44,020 | Recap |
| 14 | December 3 | Buffalo Bills | **W** 23–13 | 7–5 | Municipal Stadium | 41,948 | Recap |
| 15 | December 10 | at New York Jets | **W** 21–7 | 8–5 | Shea Stadium | 62,891 | Recap |
| 16 | December 17 | at **Denver Broncos** | **W** 38–24 | 9–5 | Bears Stadium | 31,660 | Recap |
| 17 | Bye | | | | | | |
Note: Intra-division opponents are in **bold** text.

== Game summaries ==
=== Week 14 ===
| Team | 1 | 2 | 3 | 4 | Total |
|---|---|---|---|---|---|
| • Chiefs | 14 | 14 | 7 | 3 | 38 |
| Broncos | 0 | 7 | 10 | 7 | 24 |

- Date: December 17
- Location: Bears Stadium

== Standings ==
AFL Western Division
| | W | L | T | PCT | DIV | PF | PA | STK |
|---|---|---|---|---|---|---|---|---|
| Oakland Raiders | 13 | 1 | 0 | .929 | 6–0 | 468 | 233 | W10 |
| Kansas City Chiefs | 9 | 5 | 0 | .643 | 2–4 | 408 | 254 | W3 |
| San Diego Chargers | 8 | 5 | 1 | .615 | 4–2 | 360 | 352 | L4 |
| Denver Broncos | 3 | 11 | 0 | .214 | 0–6 | 256 | 409 | L1 |

Note: Tie games were not officially counted in the standings in the AFL.
