= Larry Todd (American football) =

American football player (1942–1990)

No. 22
- Position: Running back

Personal information
- Born: October 7, 1942; Memphis, Tennessee, U.S.
- Died: January 17, 1990 (aged 47); Oakland, California, U.S.
- Listed height: 6 ft 1 in (1.85 m)
- Listed weight: 185 lb (84 kg)

Career information
- High school: Centennial (Compton, California)
- College: Arizona State (1961-1964)
- NFL draft: 1965: 4th round, 44th overall pick
- AFL draft: 1965: 1st round, 3rd overall pick

Career history
- Oakland Raiders (1965-1970)

Career NFL/AFL statistics
- Rushing yards: 625
- Rushing average: 4.5
- Receptions: 51
- Receiving yards: 522
- Total touchdowns: 7
- Stats at Pro Football Reference

Larry Todd (October 7, 1942 – October 17, 1990) was an American professional football running back in the American Football League (AFL) and National Football League (NFL) who played for the Oakland Raiders. He played college football for the Arizona State Sun Devils. Todd spent his post-football years working for the Alameda County Social Services department until his death from cancer in 1990.
