= 1967 American Football League season =

American Football League season

1967 AFL season

Regular season
- Duration: September 3 – December 24, 1967

Playoffs
- Date: December 31, 1967
- Eastern champion: Houston Oilers
- Western champion: Oakland Raiders
- Site: Oakland Coliseum, Oakland, California
- Champion: Oakland Raiders

AFL teams: West, East

The 1967 AFL season was the eighth regular season of the American Football League.

The season ended when the Oakland Raiders (13–1) hosted the Houston Oilers (9–4–1) in the AFL championship game on December 31. The Raiders won 40–7 and then met the NFL's Green Bay Packers in Super Bowl II two weeks later, won by Green Bay, 33–14.

This was the final season that all AFL on-field officials wore vertically striped red and white uniforms. The next year all officials would wear uniforms mirroring those of their NFL counterparts.

== Division races ==
The AFL's nine teams, grouped into two divisions (5 teams in the Eastern Division), faced each other at least once, and each team would play six others twice. Though the New York Jets and the Houston Oilers were both in the Eastern Division, they met only once that season, on October 15. The best team in the Eastern Division would play against the best in the Western Division in a championship game. If there was a tie in the standings at the top of either division, a one-game playoff would be held to determine the division winner.

Week	Eastern	Record	Western	Record
1	none	0-0-0	Denver	1–0–0
2	Buffalo	1–0–0	3 teams	1–0–0
3	Miami	1–0–0	3 teams	2–0–0
4	Miami	1–1–0	3 teams	2–0–0
5	N.Y. Jets	2–1–0	Tie (Oak, SD)	3–0–0
6	N.Y. Jets	3–1–0	San Diego	3–0–1
7	N.Y. Jets	3–1–1	San Diego	4–0–1
8	N.Y. Jets	4–1–1	San Diego	5–0–1
9	N.Y. Jets	5–1–1	Oakland	6–1–0
10	N.Y. Jets	5–2–1	Oakland	7–1–0
11	N.Y. Jets	6–2–1	Oakland	7–1–0
12	N.Y. Jets	7–2–1	Oakland	8–1–0
13	N.Y. Jets	7–2–1	Oakland	9–1–0
14	Tie (Hou, NYJ)	7–3–1	Oakland	10–1–0
15	Tie (Hou, NYJ)	7–4–1	Oakland	11–1–0
16	Houston	8–4–1	Oakland	12–1–0
17	Houston	9–4–1	Oakland	13–1–0

== Regular season ==
=== Results ===
Home/Road		Eastern Division					Western Division			
Home/Road		BOS	BUF	HOU	MIA	NY	DEN	KC	OAK	SD
Eastern	Boston Patriots		16–44	18–7	41–10	24–29		10–33	14–48	31–31*
Eastern	Buffalo Bills	0–23		3–20	35–13	20–17	20–21		20–24	17–37
Eastern	Houston Oilers	27–6	10–3		17–14		10–6	20–25	7–19	24–17
Eastern	Miami Dolphins	41–32	17–14	10–41		14–33	35–21	0–24		41–24
Eastern	New York Jets	30–23	20–10	28–28	29–7		24–33	7–21	27–14	
Western	Denver Broncos	26–21	16–17	18–20		24–38		24–38	17–21	21–38
Western	Kansas City Chiefs		23–13	19–24	41–0	42–18	52–9		22–44	16–17
Western	Oakland Raiders	35–7	28–21		31–17	38–29	51–0	23–21		51–10
Western	San Diego Chargers	59–45		13–3	24–0	31–42	24–20	45–31	21–41	

(*) Played at San Diego Stadium due to Fenway Park, the Patriots' home field, being used by stadium's owner, Boston Red Sox, for the 1967 World Series.

=== Standings ===
AFL Eastern Division
	W	L	T	PCT	DIV	PF	PA	STK
Houston Oilers	9	4	1	.692	5–1–1	258	199	W2
New York Jets	8	5	1	.615	5–1–1	371	329	W1
Buffalo Bills	4	10	0	.286	3–5	237	285	L1
Miami Dolphins	4	10	0	.286	2–6	219	407	L1
Boston Patriots	3	10	1	.231	3–5	280	389	L5

Note: Tie games were not officially counted in the standings in the AFL.

AFL Western Division
	W	L	T	PCT	DIV	PF	PA	STK
Oakland Raiders	13	1	0	.929	6–0	468	233	W10
Kansas City Chiefs	9	5	0	.643	2–4	408	254	W3
San Diego Chargers	8	5	1	.615	4–2	360	352	L4
Denver Broncos	3	11	0	.214	0–6	256	409	L1

== Playoffs ==
- AFL Championship Game
  - Oakland Raiders 40, Houston Oilers 7, on December 31, 1967, at Oakland–Alameda County Coliseum in Oakland, California
- Super Bowl II
  - Green Bay (NFL) 33, Oakland (AFL) 14, on January 14, 1968, at Orange Bowl in Miami

== Stadium changes ==
- The San Diego Chargers moved from Balboa Stadium to San Diego Stadium

== Coaching changes ==
- Denver Broncos: Lou Saban became the team's new head coach. Mac Speedie resigned after starting the 1966 season 0–2, and then line coach Ray Malavasi served as interim for the remaining 12 games.

== See also ==
- 1967 NFL season
