= 1970 San Diego Chargers season =

NFL team season

- Owner: Eugene V. Klein
- General manager: Sid Gillman
- Head coach: Charlie Waller
- Home stadium: San Diego Stadium

Results
- Record: 5–6–3
- Division place: 3rd AFC West
- Playoffs: Did not qualify
- All-Pros: None
- Pro Bowlers: 2: WR Gary Garrison; G Walt Sweeney

The 1970 San Diego Chargers season was the franchise's eleventh overall season and first season in the National Football League (NFL). As a result of the NFL-AFL Merger, where the league was broken into two conferences, each member of the American Football League was moved into the American Football Conference.

San Diego's 5–6–3 record was the first of seven consecutive losing seasons for the franchise. The 1970 Chargers are the last NFL team to record three ties in a single season, a record which will likely stand, as since the NFL adopted overtime for regular season games in 1974 no team has recorded more than one tie in a season.

== Offseason ==
=== NFL draft ===
1970 San Diego Chargers draft
Round	Pick	Player	Position	College	Notes
1	15	Walker Gillette	Wide receiver	Richmond	
2	42	Tom Williams	Defensive end	UC Davis	
4	94	Bill Maddox	Tight end	Syracuse	
5	119	Pettus Farrar	Running back	Norfolk State	
6	146	Billy Parks	Wide receiver	Long Beach State 49ers	
7	171	Jim Fabish	Running back	Texas-El Paso	
8	198	Wayne Clark	Quarterback	U. S. International	
9	223	Chris Fletcher	Cornerback	Temple	
10	250	Mac Steen	Guard	Florida	
11	275	Jack Protz	Linebacker	Syracuse	
12	302	Howard Gravelle	Tight end	UC Davis	
13	327	Bernard Bradley	Defensive back	Utah State	
14	354	Tyrone Caldwell	Defensive tackle	South Carolina State	
15	379	Eugene Childs	Running back	Texas-El Paso	
16	406	Mike Green	Running back	Nebraska	
17	431	Dave Sanks	Guard	Louisville	
Made roster * Made at least one Pro Bowl during career

=== Undrafted free agents ===
1970 undrafted free agents of note
Player	Position	College
Ed Roseborough	Quarterback	Arizona State
Reg Sharley	Linebacker	Memphis State
Karl Sneider	Wide receiver	Augsburg
James Snow	Linebacker	USC
LeeVone Spencer	Linebacker	Prairie View A&M
Bill Stansfield	Defensive tackle	Penn State
Ben Stephens	Defensive back	Grambling
Dan Thatcher	Kicker	Occidental
Lee Thomas	Defensive end	Jackson State
Paul Tollefson	Tackle	UC Santa Barbara

== Roster ==
1970 San Diego Chargers roster
Quarterbacks (QB): 13 Wayne Clark; 14 Marty Domres; 21 John Hadl; Running backs (RB): 37 Gene Foster; 25 Mike Garrett; 26 Brad Hubbert; 22 Dickie Post; 47 Jeff Queen; 42 Dave Smith; 20 Russ Smith; Wide receivers (WR): 19 Lance Alworth; 49 Rick Eber; 27 Gary Garrison; 84 Walker Gillette; Tight ends (TE): 83 Willie Frazier; 89 Art Strozier	Offensive linemen (OL): 69 Ira Gordon T; 65 Sam Gruneisen C; 51 Bill Lenkaitis G; 76 Terry Owens T; 64 Jim Schmedding G; 78 Walt Sweeney G; 70 Russ Washington T; 57 Cal Withrow C; Defensive linemen (DL): 86 Ron Billingsley DT; 82 Steve DeLong DE; 75 Gene Ferguson DT; 72 Joe Owens DE; 79 Andy Rice DT/DE; 87 Tom Williams DT/DE	Linebackers (LB): 60 Bob Babich MLB; 59 Pete Barnes OLB; 56 Bob Bruggers OLB; 58 Harris Jones OLB; 50 Jack Protz OLB; 66 Rick Redman MLB; 81 Jeff Staggs OLB; Defensive backs (DB): 40 Joe Beauchamp CB; 35 Chuck Detwiler SS; 45 Speedy Duncan CB; 44 Chris Fletcher CB/S; 39 Jim Hill FS; 24 Bob Howard CB; 43 Jim Tolbert SS; Special teams (ST): 15 Mike Mercer K; 29 Dennis Partee P	Reserve: 32 Billy Parks WR Retired; Rookies in italics

== Preseason ==
Week	Date	Opponent	Result	Record	Venue	Attendance
1	August 8	Dallas Cowboys	L 10–20	0–1	San Diego Stadium	
2	August 15	New York Giants	W 30–27	1–1	San Diego Stadium	
3	August 24	Chicago Bears	W 14–9	2–1	San Diego Stadium	
4	August 29	Los Angeles Rams	L 14–16	2–2	San Diego Stadium	
5	September 5	vs. St. Louis Cardinals	W 38–27	3–2	Municipal Stadium (Cleveland)	
6	September 12	at New Orleans Saints	L 14–20	3–3	Tulane Stadium	

== Regular season ==
=== Schedule ===
Week	Date	Opponent	Result	Record	Venue	Attendance	Recap
1	September 20	Baltimore Colts	**L** 14–16	0–1	San Diego Stadium	47,782	Recap
2	September 27	**Oakland Raiders**	**T** 27–27	0–1–1	San Diego Stadium	42,109	Recap
3	October 4	at Los Angeles Rams	**L** 10–37	0–2–1	Los Angeles Memorial Coliseum	69,564	Recap
4	October 12	Green Bay Packers	**L** 20–22	0–3–1	San Diego Stadium	53,064	Recap
5	October 18	at Chicago Bears	**W** 20–7	1–3–1	Wrigley Field	45,278	Recap
6	October 25	Houston Oilers	**T** 31–31	1–3–2	San Diego Stadium	41,427	Recap
7	November 1	at Cleveland Browns	**W** 27–10	2–3–2	Cleveland Municipal Stadium	80,047	Recap
8	November 8	**Denver Broncos**	**W** 24–21	3–3–2	San Diego Stadium	48,327	Recap
9	November 15	at Boston Patriots	**W** 16–14	4–3–2	Harvard Stadium	30,597	Recap
10	November 22	at **Oakland Raiders**	**L** 17–20	4–4–2	Oakland–Alameda County Coliseum	54,594	Recap
11	November 29	at **Kansas City Chiefs**	**L** 14–26	4–5–2	Municipal Stadium	50,315	Recap
12	December 6	Cincinnati Bengals	**L** 14–17	4–6–2	San Diego Stadium	41,461	Recap
13	December 13	at **Denver Broncos**	**T** 17–17	4–6–3	Mile High Stadium	50,959	Recap
14	December 20	**Kansas City Chiefs**	**W** 31–13	5–6–3	San Diego Stadium	41,379	Recap
Note: Intra-division opponents are in **bold** text.

=== Game summaries ===
==== Week 1: vs. Baltimore Colts ====
Week One: Baltimore Colts at San Diego Chargers – Game summary

Quarter	1	2	3	4	Total
**Colts**	0	3	7	6	**16**
Chargers	0	0	7	7	**14**

at San Diego Stadium, San Diego, California

- Date: September 20
- Game time: 1:00 p.m. PDT
- Game weather: 66 °F (18.9 °C), relative humidity 70%, wind 8 mph
- Game attendance: 47,782
- Box score

Game information

**First quarter**

- No scoring plays.

**Second quarter**

- BAL – Jim O'Brien 25-yard field goal. Colts 3–0.

**Third quarter**

- SDG – Gary Garrison 65-yard pass from John Hadl (Mike Mercer kick). Chargers 7–3.
- BAL – Norm Bulaich 1-yard run (Jim O'Brien kick). Colts 10–7.

**Fourth quarter**

- BAL – Jim O'Brien 34-yard field goal. Colts 13–7.
- SDG – Gary Garrison 43-yard pass from John Hadl (Mike Mercer kick). Chargers 14–13.
- BAL – Jim O'Brien 28-yard field goal. Colts 16–14.

**Top passers**

- BAL – Johnny Unitas – 15/31, 202 yards, INT
- SDG – John Hadl – 17/36, 255 yards, 2 TD

**Top rushers**

- BAL – Tom Matte – 12 rushes, 43 yards
  BAL – Norm Bulaich – 10 rushes, 43 yards, TD
- SDG – Gene Foster – 12 rushes, 31 yards

**Top receivers**

- BAL – Roy Jefferson – 5 receptions, 84 yards
- SDG – Gary Garrison – 3 receptions, 122 yards, 2 TD

==== Week 2: vs. Oakland Raiders ====
Week Two: Oakland Raiders at San Diego Chargers – Game summary

Quarter	1	2	3	4	Total
Raiders	3	17	0	7	**27**
Chargers	3	7	3	14	**27**

at San Diego Stadium, San Diego, California

- Date: September 27
- Game time: 1:00 p.m. PDT
- Game weather: 81 °F (27.2 °C), relative humidity 17%, wind 9 mph
- Game attendance: 42,109
- Referee: Ben Dreith
- Box score

Game information

**First quarter**

- SDG – Mike Mercer 48-yard field goal, 6:58. Chargers 3–0. **Drive: 4 plays, 8 yards, 1:32.**
- OAK – George Blanda 28-yard field goal, 0:19. Tied 3–3. **Drive: 4 plays, 4 yards, 0:54.**

**Second quarter**

- SDG – Gary Garrison 2-yard pass from John Hadl (Mike Mercer kick), 10:21. Chargers 10–3. **Drive: 9 plays, 80 yards, 4:58.**
- OAK – Pete Banaszak 1-yard run (George Blanda kick), 4:26. Tied 10–10. **Drive: 6 plays, 71 yards, 5:55.**
- OAK – Fred Biletnikoff 23-yard pass from Daryle Lamonica (George Blanda kick), 2:21. Raiders 17–10. **Drive: 2 plays, 26 yards, 0:50.**
- OAK – George Blanda 13-yard field goal, 0:04. Raiders 20–10. **Drive: 8 plays, 76 yards, 0:46.**

**Third quarter**

- SDG – Mike Mercer 39-yard field goal, 5:15. Raiders 20–13. **Drive: 6 plays, 38 yards, 2:28.**

**Fourth quarter**

- OAK – Pete Banaszak 1-yard run (George Blanda kick), 6:36. Raiders 27–13. **Drive: 9 plays, 65 yards, 4:17.**
- SDG – Jeff Queen 65-yard pass from John Hadl (Mike Mercer kick), 5:18. Raiders 27–20. **Drive: 3 plays, 91 yards, 1:36.**
- SDG – Lance Alworth 37-yard pass from John Hadl (Mike Mercer kick), 2:02. Tied 27–27. **Drive: 1 play, 53 yards, 0:19.**

**Top passers**

- OAK – Daryle Lamonica – 23/38, 267 yards, TD
- SDG – John Hadl – 10/25, 242 yards, 3 TD, 2 INT

**Top rushers**

- OAK – Charlie Smith – 18 rushes, 71 yards
- SDG – Russ Smith – 11 rushes, 55 yards

**Top receivers**

- OAK – Warren Wells – 7 receptions, 127 yards
- SDG – Jeff Queen – 1 reception, 65 yards, TD

==== Week 3: at Los Angeles Rams ====
Week Three: San Diego Chargers at Los Angeles Rams – Game summary

Quarter	1	2	3	4	Total
Chargers	0	3	7	0	**10**
**Rams**	10	20	0	7	**37**

at Memorial Coliseum, Los Angeles, California

- Date: October 4
- Game time: 1:00 p.m. PDT
- Game weather: 68 °F (20.0 °C), relative humidity 79%, wind 11 mph
- Game attendance: 69,564
- Box score

Game information

**First quarter**

- RAM – Jack Snow 17-yard pass from Roman Gabriel (David Ray kick). Rams 7–0.
- RAM – David Ray 27-yard field goal. Rams 10–0.

**Second quarter**

- RAM – Les Josephson 12-yard run (David Ray kick). Rams 17–0.
- RAM – Pat Curran recovered blocked punt in end zone (David Ray kick). Rams 24–0.
- SDG – Mike Mercer 30-yard field goal. Rams 24–3.
- RAM – David Ray 10-yard field goal. Rams 27–3.
- RAM – David Ray 38-yard field goal. Rams 30–3.

**Third quarter**

- SDG – Willie Frazier 6-yard pass from Marty Domres (Mike Mercer kick). Rams 30–10.

**Fourth quarter**

- RAM – Jack Snow 20-yard pass from Karl Sweetan (David Ray kick). Rams 37–10.

**Top passers**

- SDG – Marty Domres – 8/11, 99 yards, TD
- RAM – Roman Gabriel – 8/12, 104 yards, TD

**Top rushers**

- SDG – Russ Smith – 17 rushes, 36 yards
- RAM – Les Josephson – 14 rushes, 71 yards, TD

**Top receivers**

- SDG – Willie Frazier – 5 receptions, 63 yards, TD
- RAM – Jack Snow – 5 receptions, 69 yards, 2 TD

==== Week 4: vs. Green Bay Packers ====
Week Four: Green Bay Packers at San Diego Chargers – Game summary

Quarter	1	2	3	4	Total
**Packers**	3	3	13	3	**22**
Chargers	0	6	0	14	**20**

at San Diego Stadium, San Diego, California

- Date: October 12
- Game time: 6:00 p.m. PDT
- Game weather: 68 °F (20.0 °C), relative humidity 72%, wind 8 mph
- Game attendance: 53,064
- Box score

Game information

**First quarter**

- GB – Dale Livingston 16-yard field goal. Packers 3–0.

**Second quarter**

- GB – Dale Livingston 27-yard field goal. Packers 6–0.
- SDG – Mike Mercer 16-yard field goal. Packers 6–3.
- SDG – Mike Mercer 39-yard field goal. Tied 6–6.

**Third quarter**

- GB – Jack Clancy 4-yard pass from Bart Starr (kick blocked). Packers 12–6.
- GB – John Hilton 2-yard pass from Bart Starr (Dale Livingston kick). Packers 19–6.

**Fourth quarter**

- SDG – Willie Frazier 24-yard run (Mike Mercer kick). Packers 19–13.
- SDG – Jeff Queen 1-yard run (Mike Mercer kick). Chargers 20–19.
- GB – Dale Livingston 14-yard field goal. Packers 22–20.

**Top passers**

- GB – Bart Starr – 16/20, 158 yards, 2 TD
- SDG – John Hadl – 6/19, 53 yards, 3 INT

**Top rushers**

- GB – Travis Williams – 21 rushes, 109 yards
- SDG – Willie Frazier – 2 rushes, 94 yards, TD

**Top receivers**

- GB – Carroll Dale – 8 receptions, 90 yards
- SDG – Dave Smith – 1 reception, 42 yards

==== Week 5: at Chicago Bears ====
Week Five: San Diego Chargers at Chicago Bears – Game summary

Quarter	1	2	3	4	Total
**Chargers**	0	7	13	0	**20**
Bears	0	7	0	0	**7**

at Wrigley Field, Chicago, Illinois

- Date: October 18
- Game time: 1:00 p.m. CDT
- Game weather: 50 °F (10.0 °C), relative humidity 55%, wind 10 mph
- Game attendance: 45,278
- Box score

Game information

**First quarter**

- No scoring plays.

**Second quarter**

- CHI – Dick Gordon 11-yard pass from Jack Concannon (Mac Percival kick). Bears 7–0.
- SDG – Russ Smith 1-yard run (Mike Mercer kick). Tied 7–7.

**Third quarter**

- SDG – Gary Garrison 14-yard pass from John Hadl (Mike Mercer kick). Chargers 14–7.

**Fourth quarter**

- SDG – Gary Garrison 33-yard pass from John Hadl (kick failed). Chargers 20–7.

**Top passers**

- SDG – John Hadl – 10/14, 166 yards, 2 TD
- CHI – Jack Concannon – 17/34, 117 yards, TD, INT

**Top rushers**

- SDG – Gene Foster – 10 rushes, 30 yards
- CHI – Don Shy – 11 rushes, 38 yards

**Top receivers**

- SDG – Gary Garrison – 8 receptions, 165 yards, 2 TD
- CHI – Dick Gordon – 5 receptions, 41 yards, TD

==== Week 6: vs. Houston Oilers ====
Week Six: Houston Oilers at San Diego Chargers – Game summary

Quarter	1	2	3	4	Total
Oilers	0	17	14	0	**31**
Chargers	0	14	7	10	**31**

at San Diego Stadium, San Diego, California

- Date: October 25
- Game time: 1:00 p.m. PST
- Game weather: 63 °F (17.2 °C), relative humidity 67%, wind 10 mph
- Game attendance: 41,427
- Box score

Game information

**First quarter**

- No scoring plays.

**Second quarter**

- HOU – Mike Richardson 2-yard run (Roy Gerela kick). Oilers 7–0.
- SDG – Russ Smith 4-yard run (Mike Mercer kick). Tied 7–7.
- HOU – Jerry Rhome 8-yard run (Roy Gerela kick). Oilers 14–7.
- SDG – Willie Frazier 3-yard pass from John Hadl (Mike Mercer kick). Tied 14–14.
- HOU – Roy Gerela 18-yard field goal. Oilers 17–14.

**Third quarter**

- HOU – Alvin Reed 17-yard pass from Jerry Rhome (Roy Gerela kick). Oilers 24–14.
- HOU – Charlie Joiner 10-yard pass from Jerry Rhome (Roy Gerela kick). Oilers 31–14.
- SDG – Russ Smith 3-yard run (Mike Mercer kick). Oilers 31–21.

**Fourth quarter**

- SDG – Mike Mercer 45-yard field goal. Oilers 31–24.
- SDG – Lance Alworth 80-yard pass from Marty Domres (Mike Mercer kick). Tied 31–31.

**Top passers**

- HOU – Jerry Rhome – 21/36, 266 yards, 2 TD
- SDG – Marty Domres – 4/7, 141 yards, TD, INT

**Top rushers**

- HOU – Joe Dawkins – 25 rushes, 90 yards
- SDG – Russ Smith – 10 rushes, 24 yards, 2 TD

**Top receivers**

- HOU – Charlie Joiner – 5 receptions, 100 yards, TD
- SDG – Lance Alworth – 2 receptions, 124 yards, TD

==== Week 7: at Cleveland Browns ====
Week Seven: San Diego Chargers at Cleveland Browns – Game summary

Quarter	1	2	3	4	Total
**Chargers**	0	14	7	6	**27**
Broncos	3	7	0	0	**10**

at Municipal Stadium, Cleveland, Ohio

- Date: November 1
- Game time: 1:00 p.m. EST
- Game weather: 48 °F (8.9 °C), relative humidity 83%, wind 6 mph
- Game attendance: 80,047
- Referee: Walt Fitzgerald
- Box score

Game information

**First quarter**

- CLE – Don Cockroft 11-yard field goal, 5:44. Browns 3–0. **Drive: 14 plays, 63 yards, 7:04.**

**Second quarter**

- SDG – Lance Alworth 44-yard pass from John Hadl (Mike Mercer kick), 8:24. Chargers 7–3. **Drive: 6 plays, 80 yards, 3:20.**
- SDG – Chuck Detwiler 20-yard fumble return (Mike Mercer kick), 4:34. Chargers 14–3.
- CLE – Bo Scott 9-yard pass from Bill Nelsen (Don Cockroft kick), 0:26. Chargers 14–10. **Drive: 10 plays, 80 yards, 4:08.**

**Third quarter**

- SDG – Brad Hubbert 1-yard run (Mike Mercer kick), 9:47. Chargers 21–10. **Drive: 5 plays, 45 yards, 2:53.**

**Fourth quarter**

- SDG – Mike Mercer 37-yard field goal, 10:06. Chargers 24–10. **Drive: 16 plays, 50 yards, 7:30.**
- SDG – Mike Mercer 12-yard field goal, 2:17. Chargers 27–10. **Drive: 14 plays, 76 yards, 7:15.**

**Top passers**

- SDG – John Hadl – 13/21, 206 yards, TD
- CLE – Bill Nelsen – 11/23, 144 yards, TD, INT

**Top rushers**

- SDG – Brad Hubbert – 16 rushes, 61 yards, TD
- CLE – Bo Scott – 13 rushes, 83 yards

**Top receivers**

- SDG – Willie Frazier – 5 receptions, 83 yards
- CLE – Milt Morin – 3 receptions, 51 yards

==== Week 8: vs. Denver Broncos ====
Week Eight: Denver Broncos at San Diego Chargers – Game summary

Quarter	1	2	3	4	Total
Broncos	0	7	7	7	**21**
**Chargers**	3	14	0	7	**24**

at San Diego Stadium, San Diego, California

- Date: November 8
- Game time: 1:00 p.m. PST
- Game weather: 61 °F (16.1 °C), relative humidity 69%, wind 9 mph
- Game attendance: 48,327
- Referee: Fred Silva
- Box score

Game information

**First quarter**

- SDG – Mike Mercer 38-yard field goal, 5:01. Chargers 3–0. **Drive: 4 plays, 1 yard, 1:05.**

**Second quarter**

- DEN – Billy Masters 2-yard pass from Steve Tensi (Bobby Howfield kick), 13:14. Broncos 7–3. **Drive: 13 plays, 85 yards, 6:47.**
- SDG – Gary Garrison 31-yard pass from John Hadl (Mike Mercer kick), 8:42. Chargers 10–7. **Drive: 7 plays, 80 yards, 1:42.**
- SDG – Willie Frazier 5-yard pass from John Hadl (Mike Mercer kick), 0:58. Chargers 17–7. **Drive: 9 plays, 82 yards, 4:04.**

**Third quarter**

- DEN – Willis Crenshaw 3-yard run (Bobby Howfield kick), 7:40. Chargers 17–14. **Drive: 6 plays, 51 yards, 3:31.**

**Fourth quarter**

- SDG – Gary Garrison 40-yard pass from John Hadl (Mike Mercer kick), 5:22. Chargers 24–14. **Drive: 7 plays, 80 yards, 3:39.**
- DEN – Bobby Anderson 2-yard run (Bobby Howfield kick), 1:47. Chargers 24–21. **Drive: 9 plays, 76 yards, 3:35.**

**Top passers**

- DEN – Steve Tensi – 14/22, 170 yards, TD, INT
- SDG – John Hadl – 14/21, 185 yards, 3 TD

**Top rushers**

- DEN – Floyd Little – 19 rushes, 74 yards
- SDG – Dickie Post – 15 rushes, 34 yards

**Top receivers**

- DEN – Al Denson – 4 receptions, 63 yards
- SDG – Gary Garrison – 2 receptions, 71 yards, 2 TD

==== Week 9: at Boston Patriots ====
Week Nine: San Diego Chargers at Boston Patriots – Game summary

Quarter	1	2	3	4	Total
**Chargers**	0	0	7	9	**16**
Patriots	7	0	0	7	**14**

at Harvard Stadium, Boston, Massachusetts

- Date: November 15
- Game time: 1:00 p.m. EST
- Game weather: 44 °F (6.7 °C), relative humidity 97%, wind 17 mph
- Game attendance: 30,597
- Referee: Ben Dreith
- Box score

Game information

**First quarter**

- NE – Jim Nance 2-yard run (Charlie Gogolak kick), 10:25. Patriots 7–0. **Drive: 8 plays, 45 yards, 4:35.**

**Second quarter**

- No scoring plays.

**Third quarter**

- SDG – Lance Alworth 6-yard pass from John Hadl (Mike Mercer kick), 5:47. Tied 7–7. **Drive: 10 plays, 84 yards, 4:46.**

**Fourth quarter**

- SDG – Safety, Joe Owens sacked Joe Kapp in end zone, 13:42. Chargers 9–7.
- SDG – Gary Garrison 60-yard pass from John Hadl (Mike Mercer kick), 6:45. Chargers 16–7. **Drive: 3 plays, 61 yards, 0:59.**
- NE – Bake Turner 14-yard pass from Joe Kapp (Charlie Gogolak kick), 0:56. Chargers 16–14. **Drive: 7 plays, 67 yards, 1:29.**

**Top passers**

- SDG – John Hadl – 16/36, 238 yards, 2 TD
- NE – Joe Kapp – 9/17, 110 yards, TD

**Top rushers**

- SDG – Brad Hubbert – 6 rushes, 18 yards
- NE – Odell Lawson – 18 rushes, 45 yards

**Top receivers**

- SDG – Gary Garrison – 3 receptions, 98 yards, TD
- NE – Bake Turner – 2 receptions, 29 yards, TD

==== Week 10: at Oakland Raiders ====
Week Ten: San Diego Chargers at Oakland Raiders – Game summary

Quarter	1	2	3	4	Total
Chargers	0	0	7	9	**16**
**Raiders**	7	0	0	7	**14**

at Oakland-Alameda County Coliseum, Oakland, California

- Date: November 22
- Game time: 1:00 p.m. PST
- Game weather: 56 °F (13.3 °C), relative humidity 75%, wind 8 mph
- Game attendance: 54,594
- Referee: Pat Haggerty
- Box score

Game information

**First quarter**

- SDG – Gary Garrison 5-yard pass from John Hadl (Mike Mercer kick), 6:36. Chargers 7–0. **Drive: 11 plays, 57 yards, 5:10.**

**Second quarter**

- OAK – Charlie Smith 3-yard run (George Blanda kick), 2:42. Tied 7–7. **Drive: 4 plays, 39 yards, 1:59.**

**Third quarter**

- SDG – Gary Garrison 15-yard pass from John Hadl (Mike Mercer kick), 9:11. Chargers 14–7. **Drive: 7 plays, 57 yards, 4:11.**
- OAK – Charlie Smith 1-yard run (George Blanda kick), 5:50. Tied 14–14. **Drive: 6 plays, 76 yards, 3:21.**

**Fourth quarter**

- OAK – George Blanda 18-yard field goal, 14:58. Raiders 17–14. **Drive: 6 plays, 45 yards, 1:38.**
- SDG – Mike Mercer 11-yard field goal, 4:46. Tied 17–17. **Drive: 13 plays, 56 yards, 4:58.**
- OAK – George Blanda 16-yard field goal, 0:04. Raiders 20–17. **Drive: 10 plays, 64 yards, 4:42.**

**Top passers**

- SDG – John Hadl – 12/27, 187 yards, 2 TD, 2 INT
- OAK – Daryle Lamonica – 14/23, 213 yards

**Top rushers**

- SDG – Dickie Post – 15 rushes, 64 yards
- OAK – Charlie Smith – 15 rushes, 84 yards, 2 TD

**Top receivers**

- SDG – Gary Garrison – 6 receptions, 114 yards, 2 TD
- OAK – Fred Biletnikoff – 6 receptions, 115 yards

==== Week 11: at Kansas City Chiefs ====
Week Eleven: San Diego Chargers at Kansas City Chiefs – Game summary

Quarter	1	2	3	4	Total
Chargers	7	0	0	7	**14**
**Chiefs**	10	3	7	6	**26**

at Municipal Stadium, Kansas City, Missouri

- Date: November 29
- Game time: 3:00 p.m. CST
- Game weather: 48 °F (8.9 °C), relative humidity 89%, wind 7 mph
- Game attendance: 50,315
- Referee: Jim Tunney
- Box score

Game information

**First quarter**

- KAN – Morris Stroud 50-yard pass from Len Dawson (Jan Stenerud kick), 12:40. Chiefs 7–0. **Drive: 4 plays, 80 yards, 2:20.**
- SDG – Dickie Post 1-yard run (Mike Mercer kick), 4:33. Tied 7–7. **Drive: 7 plays, 41 yards, 3:59.**
- KAN – Jan Stenerud 43-yard field goal, 0:09. Chiefs 10–7. **Drive: 8 plays, 45 yards, 4:24.**

**Second quarter**

- KAN – Jan Stenerud 39-yard field goal, 0:16. Chiefs 13–7. **Drive: 9 plays, 34 yards, 4:23.**

**Third quarter**

- KAN – Wendell Hayes 1-yard run (Jan Stenerud kick), 10:35. Chiefs 20–7. **Drive: 6 plays, 31 yards, 3:35.**

**Fourth quarter**

- KAN – Jan Stenerud 17-yard field goal, 11:49. Chiefs 23–7. **Drive: 16 plays, 87 yards, 8:19.**
- SDG – Gary Garrison 28-yard pass from John Hadl (Mike Mercer kick), 8:07. Chiefs 23–14. **Drive: 2 plays, 30 yards, 0:59.**
- KAN – Jan Stenerud 26-yard field goal, 4:32. Chiefs 26–14. **Drive: 4 plays, 0 yards, 1:16.**

**Top passers**

- SDG – John Hadl – 15/26, 155 yards, TD, 2 INT
- KAN – Len Dawson – 17/24, 208 yards, TD, INT

**Top rushers**

- SDG – Dickie Post – 7 rushes, 13 yards, TD
- KAN – Ed Podolak – 19 rushes, 52 yards

**Top receivers**

- SDG – Dickie Post – 6 receptions, 53 yards
- KAN – Morris Stroud – 1 reception, 50 yards, TD

==== Week 12: vs. Cincinnati Bengals ====
Week Twelve: Cincinnati Bengals at San Diego Chargers – Game summary

Quarter	1	2	3	4	Total
**Bengals**	0	10	7	0	**17**
Chargers	0	7	0	7	**14**

at San Diego Stadium, San Diego, California

- Date: December 6
- Game time: 1:00 p.m. PST
- Game weather: 61 °F (16.1 °C), relative humidity 54%, wind 6 mph
- Game attendance: 41,461
- Box score

Game information

**First quarter**

- No scoring plays.

**Second quarter**

- CIN – Horst Muhlmann 53-yard field goal. Bengals 3–0.
- CIN – Lemar Parrish 79-yard punt return (Horst Muhlmann kick). Bengals 10–0.
- SDG – John Hadl 2-yard run (Mike Mercer kick). Bengals 10–7.

**Third quarter**

- CIN – Jess Phillips 13-yard rush (Horst Muhlmann kick). Bengals 17–7.

**Fourth quarter**

- SDG – Willie Frazier 2-yard pass from John Hadl (Mike Mercer kick). Bengals 17–14.

**Top passers**

- CIN – Virgil Carter – 7/18, 19 yards, INT
- SDG – John Hadl – 14/27, 156 yards, TD, INT

**Top rushers**

- CIN – Jess Phillips – 15 rushes, 55 yards, TD
- SDG – Dickie Post – 12 rushes, 46 yards

**Top receivers**

- CIN – Chip Myers – 2 receptions, 18 yards
- SDG – Lance Alworth – 4 receptions, 50 yards

==== Week 13: at Denver Broncos ====
Week Thirteen: San Diego Chargers at Denver Broncos – Game summary

Quarter	1	2	3	4	Total
Chargers	7	10	0	0	**17**
Broncos	0	0	3	14	**17**

at Mile High Stadium, Denver, Colorado

- Date: December 13
- Game time: 2:00 p.m. MST
- Game weather: 23 °F (−5.0 °C), relative humidity 71%, wind 6 mph, wind chill 16
- Game attendance: 50,959
- Referee: John McDonough
- Box score

Game information

**First quarter**

- SDG – Gary Garrison 63-yard pass from John Hadl (Mike Mercer kick), 9:07. Chargers 7–0. **Drive: 5 plays, 72 yards, 2:05.**

**Second quarter**

- SDG – Mike Mercer 42-yard field goal, 8:28. Chargers 10–0. **Drive: 7 plays, 26 yards, 3:42.**
- SDG – Willie Frazier offensive fumble recovery in end zone (Mike Mercer kick), 0:36. Chargers 17–0. **Drive: 11 plays, 36 yards.**

**Third quarter**

- DEN – Bobby Howfield 53-yard field goal, 12:23. Chargers 17–3. **Drive: 6 plays, 32 yards, 2:37.**

**Fourth quarter**

- DEN – Clem Turner 1-yard run (Bobby Howfield kick), 5:25. Chargers 17–10. **Drive: 11 plays, 61 yards, 5:37.**
- DEN – Willis Crenshaw 1-yard run (Bobby Howfield kick), 1:57. Tied 17–17. **Drive: 8 plays, 34 yards, 1:32.**

**Top passers**

- SDG – John Hadl – 8/19, 144 yards, TD
- DEN – Pete Liske – 6/17, 95 yards, 2 INT

**Top rushers**

- SDG – Jeff Queen – 17 rushes, 36 yards
- DEN – Bobby Anderson – 12 rushes, 64 yards

**Top receivers**

- SDG – Gary Garrison – 2 receptions, 81 yards, TD
- DEN – Al Denson – 5 receptions, 55 yards

==== Week 14: vs. Kansas City Chiefs ====
Week Fourteen: Kansas City Chiefs at San Diego Chargers – Game summary

Quarter	1	2	3	4	Total
Chiefs	0	10	3	0	**13**
**Chargers**	3	14	7	7	**31**

at San Diego Stadium, San Diego, California

- Date: December 20
- Game time: 1:00 p.m. PST
- Game weather: 54 °F (12.2 °C), relative humidity 69%, wind 10 mph
- Game attendance: 41,379
- Referee: Norm Schachter
- Box score

Game information

**First quarter**

- SDG – Mike Mercer 27-yard field goal, 5:49. Chargers 3–0. **Drive: 9 plays, 63 yards, 3:09.**

**Second quarter**

- SDG – Willie Frazier 5-yard pass from John Hadl (Mike Mercer kick), 13:22. Chargers 10–0. **Drive: 2 plays, 5 yards, 0:43.**
- KAN – Gloster Richardson 61-yard pass from Len Dawson (Jan Stenerud kick), 8:40. Chargers 10–7. **Drive: 7 plays, 68 yards, 4:42.**
- SDG – Mike Garrett 5-yard run (Mike Mercer kick), 1:10. Chargers 17–7. **Drive: 8 plays, 95 yards, 2:45.**
- KAN – Jan Stenerud 37-yard field goal, 0:13. Chargers 17–10. **Drive: 6 plays, 37 yards, 0:57.**

**Third quarter**

- KAN – Jan Stenerud 10-yard field goal, 6:43. Chargers 17–13. **Drive: 12 plays, 68 yards, 8:17.**
- SDG – Willie Frazier 3-yard pass from John Hadl (Mike Mercer kick), 1:00. Chargers 24–13. **Drive: 11 plays, 67 yards, 5:43.**

**Fourth quarter**

- SDG – Mike Garrett 44-yard pass from John Hadl (Mike Mercer kick), 8:22. Chargers 31–13. **Drive: 10 plays, 78 yards, 5:10.**

**Top passers**

- KAN – Len Dawson – 14/21, 161 yards, TD
- SDG – John Hadl – 16/27, 277 yards, 3 TD

**Top rushers**

- KAN – Ed Podolak – 14 rushes, 56 yards
- SDG – Mike Garrett – 10 rushes, 60 yards, TD

**Top receivers**

- KAN – Gloster Richardson – 1 reception, 61 yards, TD
- SDG – Gary Garrison – 5 receptions, 149 yards

=== Standings ===
AFC West
	W	L	T	PCT	DIV	CONF	PF	PA	STK
Oakland Raiders	8	4	2	.667	4–0–2	7–2–2	300	293	L1
Kansas City Chiefs	7	5	2	.583	2–3–1	7–3–1	272	244	L2
San Diego Chargers	5	6	3	.455	2–2–2	4–4–3	282	278	W1
Denver Broncos	5	8	1	.385	1–4–1	3–6–1	253	264	L1

Note: Tie games were not officially counted in the standings until 1972.

== Awards ==
Walt Sweeney and Gary Garrison were named to the AFC Pro Bowl squad; No Chargers were named All-Pro by the Associated Press, though Sweeney was named the best in his Conference. Babich was a runner-up for the AP Defensive Rookie of the Year award, receiving at least one vote.
