= 1969 San Diego Chargers season =

NFL team season

- Owner: Eugene V. Klein
- General manager: Sid Gillman
- Head coach: Sid Gillman (4–5); Charlie Waller (4–1)
- Home stadium: San Diego Stadium

Results
- Record: 8–6
- Division place: 3rd Western Division
- Playoffs: Did not qualify
- All-AFL: 5: FL Lance Alworth (2nd team); LB Pete Barnes (2nd team); S Kenny Graham (2nd team); RB Dickie Post (2nd team); G Walt Sweeney (2nd team)
- AFL All-Stars: 7: FL Lance Alworth; DE Steve DeLong; TE Willie Frazier; S Kenny Graham; QB John Hadl; RB Dickie Post; G Walt Sweeney

The 1969 San Diego Chargers season was the team's tenth as a franchise and their ninth in San Diego. It began with the team trying to improve on their 9–5 record in 1968, as this would be the last season for the team with a winning record until 1978. It was the last American Football League season before the AFL–NFL merger. It was also Sid Gillman's final season as the team's head coach, as he resigned due to poor health in the middle of the season, and Charlie Waller took over for the last five games.

== Offseason ==
=== NFL/AFL draft ===
1969 San Diego Chargers draft
Round	Pick	Player	Position	College	Notes
1	9	Marty Domres	Quarterback	Columbia	
1	18	Bob Babich	Linebacker	Miami (Ohio)	
2	44	Ron Sayers	Running back	Omaha	
3	70	Gene Ferguson	Tackle	Norfolk State	
5	122	Harry Orszulak	Flanker	Pittsburgh Panthers	
6	147	Terry Swarn	Flanker	Colorado State	
8	200	Craig Cotton	Tight end	Youngstown State	Played for the Chargers in 1975 after missing the roster in 1969
9	226	Joe Williams	Defensive back	Southern	
10	251	David Arnold	Guard	Northwestern	Graduated in 1967; drafted from the Texarkana Titans of the Texas Football League
11	278	Willie Norwood	Tight end	Alcorn State	
12	304	Jim White	Running back	Arkansas-Pine Bluff	
13	330	Mike Simpson	Defensive back	Houston	
14	356	Bill Ackman	Defensive tackle	New Mexico State	
15	382	Charlie Jarvis	Running back	Army	
16	408	Willie Davenport	Flanker	Southern	
17	434	Larry Rentz	Defensive back	Florida	
Made roster * Made at least one Pro Bowl during career

== Roster ==
1969 San Diego Chargers roster
Quarterbacks (QB): 14 Marty Domres; 21 John Hadl; 15 Pete Mikolajewski; Running backs (RB): 37 Gene Foster; 26 Brad Hubbert; 22 Dickie Post; 31 Ron Sayers; 20 Russ Smith; Wide receivers (WR): 19 Lance Alworth; 49 Rick Eber; 27 Gary Garrison; 88 Gene Huey; Tight ends (TE): 83 Willie Frazier; 38 Jacque MacKinnon; 47 Jeff Queen	Offensive linemen (OL): 75 Gene Ferguson T; 65 Sam Gruneisen C; 51 Bill Lenkaitis G; 76 Terry Owens T; 64 Jim Schmedding G; 78 Walt Sweeney G; 77 Bob Wells T; Defensive linemen (DL): 86 Ron Billingsley DT; 68 Bob Briggs DE; 71 Levert Carr DE; 82 Steve DeLong DE; 52 Dan Sartin DT; 85 Russ Washington DT	Linebackers (LB): 50 Chuck Allen MLB; 59 Pete Barnes OLB; 56 Bob Bruggers OLB; 53 Jim Campbell OLB; 61 Jim Fetherston OLB; 66 Rick Redman MLB; 81 Jeff Staggs OLB; Defensive backs (DB): 40 Joe Beauchamp CB; 45 Speedy Duncan CB; 36 Dick Farley SS; 33 Kenny Graham SS; 39 Jim Hill FS; 24 Bob Howard CB; 48 Larry Rentz FS; 43 Jim Tolbert CB; Special teams (ST): 29 Dennis Partee K/P	Practice squad: 57 Cal Withrow C; Reserve: 60 Bob Babich LB (IR); 72 Gary Kirner G (IR); 74 Ron Mix T Retired; 80 Houston Ridge DE (IR); 44 Richard Trapp WR (IR); Rookies in italics

== Preseason ==
Week	Date	Opponent	Result	Record	Venue	Attendance
1	August 2	Baltimore Colts	L 6–26	0–1	San Diego Stadium	
2	August 9	New Orleans Saints	W 10–7	1–1	San Diego Stadium	
3	August 16	Oakland Raiders	W 10–7	2–1	San Diego Stadium	
4	August 23	Cleveland Browns	T 19–19	2–1–1	San Diego Stadium	
5	August 30	Los Angeles Rams	L 14–24	2–2–1	San Diego Stadium	

== Regular season ==
=== Schedule ===
Week	Date	Opponent	Result	Record	Venue	Attendance	Recap
1	September 14	**Kansas City Chiefs**	**L** 9–27	0–1	San Diego Stadium	47,988	Recap
2	September 21	at **Cincinnati Bengals**	**L** 20–34	0–2	Nippert Stadium	26,243	Recap
3	September 28	New York Jets	**W** 34–27	1–2	San Diego Stadium	54,042	Recap
4	October 4	**Cincinnati Bengals**	**W** 21–14	2–2	San Diego Stadium	52,748	Recap
5	October 11	at Miami Dolphins	**W** 21–14	3–2	Miami Orange Bowl	34,585	Recap
6	October 19	at Boston Patriots	**W** 13–10	4–2	Alumni Stadium	18,346	Recap
7	October 26	**Oakland Raiders**	**L** 12–24	4–3	San Diego Stadium	54,008	Recap
8	November 2	at **Denver Broncos**	**L** 0–13	4–4	Mile High Stadium	45,511	Recap
9	November 9	at **Kansas City Chiefs**	**L** 3–27	4–5	Municipal Stadium	51,104	Recap
10	November 16	at **Oakland Raiders**	**L** 16–21	4–6	Oakland–Alameda County Coliseum	54,372	Recap
11	November 23	**Denver Broncos**	**W** 45–24	5–6	San Diego Stadium	34,664	Recap
12	November 27	at Houston Oilers	**W** 21–17	6–6	Houston Astrodome	40,065	Recap
13	December 7	Boston Patriots	**W** 28–18	7–6	San Diego Stadium	33,146	Recap
14	December 14	Buffalo Bills	**W** 45–6	8–6	San Diego Stadium	47,582	Recap
Note: Intra-division opponents are in **bold** text.

=== Game summaries ===
==== Week 1: vs. Kansas City Chiefs ====
Week One: Kansas City Chiefs at San Diego Chargers – Game summary

Quarter	1	2	3	4	Total
**Chiefs**	3	10	7	7	**27**
Chargers	3	0	6	0	**9**

at San Diego Stadium, San Diego, California

- Date: September 14
- Game time: 1:05 p.m. PDT
- Game weather: 70 °F (21.1 °C), relative humidity 74%, wind 8 mph
- Game attendance: 47,988
- Referee: Bob Finley
- Box score

Game information

**First quarter**

- KAN – Jan Stenerud 35-yard field goal, 11:20. Chiefs 3–0. **Drive: 8 plays, 45 yards, 3:40.**
- SDG – Dennis Partee 50-yard field goal, 2:50. Tied 3–3. **Drive: 6 plays, 12 yards, 2:54.**

**Second quarter**

- KAN – Wendell Hayes 1-yard run (Jan Stenerud kick), 10:00. Chiefs 10–3. **Drive: 9 plays, 90 yards, 4:20.**
- KAN – Jan Stenerud 17-yard field goal, 2:03. Chiefs 13–3. **Drive: 6 plays, 33 yards, 3:03.**

**Third quarter**

- SDG – John Hadl 9-yard run (run failed), 3:30. Chiefs 13–9. **Drive: 6 plays, 80 yards, 3:12.**
- KAN – Otis Taylor 55-yard pass from Len Dawson (Jan Stenerud kick), 2:46. Chiefs 20–9. **Drive: 1 play, 55 yards, 0:44.**

**Fourth quarter**

- KAN – Otis Taylor 9-yard pass from Len Dawson (Jan Stenerud kick), 1:20. Chiefs 27–9. **Drive: 1 play, 9 yards, 0:19.**

**Top passers**

- KAN – Len Dawson – 19/34, 223 yards, 2 TD, 2 INT
- SDG – John Hadl – 16/29, 220 yards, 4 INT

**Top rushers**

- KAN – Robert Holmes – 14 rushes, 58 yards
- SDG – Marty Domres – 1 rush, 12 yards

**Top receivers**

- KAN – Otis Taylor – 5 receptions, 111 yards, 2 TD
- SDG – Lance Alworth – 4 receptions, 94 yards

==== Week 2: at Cincinnati Bengals ====
Week Two: San Diego Chargers at Cincinnati Bengals – Game summary

Quarter	1	2	3	4	Total
Chargers	3	10	7	0	**20**
**Bengals**	7	10	14	3	**34**

at Nippert Stadium, Cincinnati, Ohio

- Date: September 21
- Game weather: 62 °F (16.7 °C), relative humidity 82%, wind 9 mph
- Game attendance: 26,243
- Box score

Game information

**First quarter**

- SDG – Dennis Partee 29-yard field goal, 5:36. Chargers 3–0. **Drive: 6 plays, 16 yards, 3:00.**
- CIN – Greg Cook 9-yard run (Horst Muhlmann kick), 1:07. Bengals 7–3. **Drive: 8 plays, 71 yards, 4:29.**

**Second quarter**

- SDG – Dennis Partee 14-yard field goal, 14:15. Bengals 7–6. **Drive: 7 plays, 74 yards, 1:52.**
- CIN – Horst Muhlmann 17-yard field goal, 5:16. Bengals 10–6. **Drive: 11 plays, 66 yards, 6:27.**
- SDG – Brad Hubbert 2-yard run (Dennis Partee kick), 1:56. Chargers 13–10. **Drive: 6 plays, 80 yards, 3:20.**
- CIN – Speedy Thomas 9-yard pass from Greg Cook (Horst Muhlmann kick), 1:05. Bengals 17–13. **Drive: 3 plays, 72 yards, 0:51.**

**Third quarter**

- CIN – Bob Trumpy 78-yard pass from Greg Cook (Horst Muhlmann kick), 9:11. Bengals 24–13. **Drive: 2 plays, 80 yards, 0:52.**
- SDG – Bob Briggs fumble recovery in end zone (Dennis Partee kick), 6:45. Bengals 24–20.
- CIN – Bruce Coslet 39-yard pass from Greg Cook (Horst Muhlmann kick), 4:25. Bengals 31–20. **Drive: 4 plays, 67 yards, 2:20.**

**Fourth quarter**

- CIN – Horst Muhlmann 23-yard field goal, 13:30. Bengals 34–20. **Drive: 8 plays, 64 yards, 2:49.**

**Top passers**

- SDG – John Hadl – 12/30, 229 yards, INT
- CIN – Greg Cook – 14/22, 327 yards, 3 TD, INT

**Top rushers**

- SDG – Dickie Post – 15 rushes, 147 yards
- CIN – Jess Phillips – 12 rushes, 59 yards

**Top receivers**

- SDG – Gary Garrison – 3 receptions, 109 yards
- CIN – Bob Trumpy – 3 receptions, 118 yards, TD

==== Week 3: vs. New York Jets ====
Week Three: New York Jets at San Diego Chargers – Game summary

Quarter	1	2	3	4	Total
Jets	0	10	3	14	**27**
**Chargers**	7	17	3	7	**34**

at San Diego Stadium, San Diego, California

- Date: September 28
- Game time: 1:00 p.m. PDT
- Game weather: 67 °F (19.4 °C), relative humidity 78%, wind 10 mph
- Game attendance: 54,042
- Referee: Ben Dreith
- Box score

Game information

**First quarter**

- SDG – Lance Alworth 9-yard pass from John Hadl (Dennis Partee kick), 4:56. Chargers 7–0. **Drive: 3 plays, 34 yards, 1:34.**

**Second quarter**

- SDG – Dennis Partee 42-yard field goal, 9:52. Chargers 10–0. **Drive: 10 plays, 33 yards.**
- NYJ – George Sauer 21-yard pass from Joe Namath (Jim Turner kick), 6:36. Chargers 10–7. **Drive: 6 plays, 64 yards, 3:16.**
- SDG – Russ Smith 5-yard run (Dennis Partee kick), 2:09. Chargers 17–7. **Drive: 8 plays, 80 yards, 4:27.**
- SDG – Gary Garrison 13-yard pass from John Hadl (Dennis Partee kick), 0:32. Chargers 24–7. **Drive: 4 plays, 33 yards, 0:36.**
- NYJ – Jim Turner 47-yard field goal, 0:04. Chargers 24–10. **Drive: 3 plays, 25 yards, 0:28.**

**Third quarter**

- NYJ – Jim Turner 37-yard field goal, 11:16. Chargers 24–13. **Drive: 6 plays, 40 yards, 2:19.**
- SDG – Dennis Partee 27-yard field goal, 2:55. Chargers 27–13. **Drive: 10 plays, 46 yards, 4:06.**

**Fourth quarter**

- NYJ – Emerson Boozer 1-yard run (Jim Turner kick), 14:18. Chargers 27–20. **Drive: 1 play, 3 yards.**
- SDG – Gary Garrison 29-yard pass from John Hadl (Dennis Partee kick), 11:17. Chargers 34–20. **Drive: 7 plays, 63 yards, 3:01.**
- NYJ – George Sauer 14-yard pass from Joe Namath (Jim Turner kick), 8:24. Chargers 34–27. **Drive: 7 plays, 77 yards, 2:53.**

**Top passers**

- NYJ – Joe Namath – 29/51, 344 yards, 2 TD, 2 INT
- SDG – John Hadl – 19/31, 281 yards, 3 TD

**Top rushers**

- NYJ – Emerson Boozer – 7 rushes, 45 yards, TD
- SDG – Dickie Post – 12 rushes, 58 yards

**Top receivers**

- NYJ – George Sauer – 9 receptions, 118 yards, 2 TD
- SDG – Gary Garrison – 10 receptions, 188 yards, 2 TD

==== Week 4: vs. Cincinnati Bengals ====
Week Four: Cincinnati Bengals at San Diego Chargers – Game summary

Quarter	1	2	3	4	Total
Bengals	7	0	7	0	**14**
**Chargers**	7	7	0	7	**21**

at San Diego Stadium, San Diego, California

- Date: October 4
- Game weather: 67 °F (19.4 °C), relative humidity 65%, wind 9 mph
- Game attendance: 52,748
- Box score

Game information

**First quarter**

- CIN – Speedy Thomas 16-yard run (Horst Muhlmann kick). Bengals 7–0.
- SDG – Brad Hubbert 8-yard run (Dennis Partee kick). Tied 7–7.

**Second quarter**

- SDG – Brad Hubbert 2-yard run (Dennis Partee kick). Chargers 14–7.

**Third quarter**

- CIN – Bob Trumpy 62-yard pass from Sam Wyche (Horst Muhlmann kick). Tied 14–14.

**Fourth quarter**

- SDG – Brad Hubbert 1-yard run (Dennis Partee kick). Chargers 21–14.

**Top passers**

- CIN – Sam Wyche – 7/18, 115 yards, TD
- SDG – John Hadl – 17/27, 238 yards, INT

**Top rushers**

- CIN – Jess Phillips – 13 rushes, 103 yards
- SDG – Dickie Post – 19 rushes, 123 yards

**Top receivers**

- CIN – Bob Trumpy – 2 receptions, 74 yards, TD
- SDG – Lance Alworth – 8 receptions, 125 yards

==== Week 5: at Miami Dolphins ====
Week Five: San Diego Chargers at Miami Dolphins – Game summary

Quarter	1	2	3	4	Total
**Chargers**	0	14	0	7	**21**
Dolphins	0	0	7	7	**14**

at Orange Bowl, Miami, Florida

- Date: October 11
- Game weather: 79 °F (26.1 °C), relative humidity 70%, wind 9 mph
- Game attendance: 34,585
- Box score

Game information

**First quarter**

- No scoring plays.

**Second quarter**

- SDG – Gary Garrison 40-yard pass from John Hadl (Dennis Partee kick), 5:28. Chargers 7–0. **Drive: 8 plays, 63 yards.**
- SDG – Gary Garrison 26-yard pass from John Hadl (Dennis Partee kick), 0:19. Chargers 14–0. **Drive: 4 plays, 45 yards.**

**Third quarter**

- MIA – Karl Noonan 5-yard pass from Bob Griese (Karl Kremser kick), 10:49. Chargers 14–7.

**Fourth quarter**

- SDG – Kenny Graham 65-yard interception return (Dennis Partee kick), 6:46. Chargers 21–7.
- MIA – Jim Kiick 2-yard run (Karl Kremser kick), 6:06. Chargers 21–14.

**Top passers**

- SDG – John Hadl – 13/28, 195 yards, 2 TD, INT
- MIA – Bob Griese – 18/31, 171 yards, TD, 2 INT

**Top rushers**

- SDG – Dickie Post – 14 rushes, 38 yards
- MIA – Jim Kiick – 11 rushes, 29 yards, TD

**Top receivers**

- SDG – Gary Garrison – 4 receptions, 103 yards, 2 TD
- MIA – Larry Seiple – 4 receptions, 64 yards

==== Week 6: at Boston Patriots ====
Week Six: San Diego Chargers at Boston Patriots – Game summary

Quarter	1	2	3	4	Total
**Chargers**	0	3	3	7	**13**
Patriots	7	0	0	3	**10**

at Alumni Stadium, Chestnut Hill, Massachusetts

- Date: October 19
- Game time: 1:30 p.m. EDT
- Game weather: 55 °F (12.8 °C), relative humidity 47%, wind 19 mph
- Game attendance: 18,346
- Referee: John McDonough
- Box score

Game information

**First quarter**

- BOS – Carl Garrett 7-yard pass from Mike Taliaferro (Gino Cappelletti kick), 9:15. Patriots 7–0. **Drive: 9 plays, 72 yards, 5:45.**

**Second quarter**

- SDG – Dennis Partee 12-yard field goal, 1:57. Patriots 7–3. **Drive: 9 plays, 67 yards, 3:45.**

**Third quarter**

- SDG – Dennis Partee 28-yard field goal, 9:10. Patriots 7–6. **Drive: 11 plays, 66 yards, 5:50.**

**Fourth quarter**

- SDG – John Hadl 6-yard run (Dennis Partee kick), 12:25. Chargers 13–7. **Drive: 3 plays, 20 yards, 1:35.**
- BOS – Gino Cappelletti 32-yard field goal, 8:24. Chargers 13–10. **Drive: 4 plays, 2 yards, 1:46.**

**Top passers**

- SDG – John Hadl – 15/26, 163 yards
- BOS – Mike Taliaferro – 11/25, 90 yards, TD, 2 INT

**Top rushers**

- SDG – Gene Foster – 13 rushes, 62 yards
- BOS – Jim Nance – 13 rushes, 69 yards

**Top receivers**

- SDG – Lance Alworth – 7 receptions, 95 yards
- BOS – Jim Whalen – 2 receptions, 43 yards

==== Week 7: vs. Oakland Raiders ====
Week Seven: Oakland Raiders at San Diego Chargers – Game summary

Quarter	1	2	3	4	Total
**Raiders**	7	7	7	3	**24**
Chargers	3	3	0	6	**12**

at San Diego Stadium, San Diego, California

- Date: October 26
- Game time: 1:00 p.m. PST
- Game weather: 63 °F (17.2 °C), relative humidity 69%, wind 10 mph
- Game attendance: 54,008
- Referee: Walt Fitzgerald
- Box score

Game information

**First quarter**

- SDG – Dennis Partee 25-yard field goal, 6:50. Chargers 3–0. **Drive: 4 plays, 33 yards, 1:28.**
- OAK – Larry Todd 48-yard pass from Daryle Lamonica (George Blanda kick), 3:04. Raiders 7–3. **Drive: 8 plays, 77 yards, 3:46.**

**Second quarter**

- OAK – Warren Wells 16-yard pass from Daryle Lamonica (George Blanda kick), 14:55. Raiders 14–3. **Drive: 6 plays, 56 yards, 2:16.**
- SDG – Dennis Partee 46-yard field goal, 6:50. Raiders 14–6. **Drive: 5 plays, 19 yards, 1:27.**

**Third quarter**

- OAK – Roger Hagberg 15-yard pass from Daryle Lamonica (George Blanda kick), 1:22. Raiders 21–6. **Drive: 8 plays, 79 yards, 4:17.**

**Fourth quarter**

- SDG – Lance Alworth 3-yard pass from John Hadl (pass failed), 11:26. Raiders 21–12. **Drive: 14 plays, 73 yards, 4:39.**
- OAK – George Blanda 28-yard field goal, 1:13. Raiders 24–12. **Drive: 9 plays, 59 yards, 4:14.**

**Top passers**

- OAK – Daryle Lamonica – 19/26, 237 yards, 3 TD, 3 INT
- SDG – John Hadl – 12/45, 167 yards, TD, 3 INT

**Top rushers**

- OAK – Pete Banaszak – 25 rushes, 123 yards
- SDG – Gene Foster – 12 rushes, 35 yards

**Top receivers**

- OAK – Warren Wells – 4 receptions, 64 yards, TD
- SDG – Lance Alworth – 6 receptions, 96 yards, TD

==== Week 8: at Denver Broncos ====
Week Eight: San Diego Chargers at Denver Broncos – Game summary

Quarter	1	2	3	4	Total
Chargers	0	0	0	0	**0**
**Broncos**	0	0	13	0	**13**

at Mile High Stadium, Denver, Colorado

- Date: November 2
- Game weather: 29 °F (−1.7 °C), relative humidity 83%, wind 6 mph, wind chill 24
- Game attendance: 45,511
- Box score

Game information

**First quarter**

- No scoring plays.

**Second quarter**

- No scoring plays.

**Third quarter**

- DEN – Al Denson 2-yard pass from Steve Tensi (kick failed), 9:48. Broncos 6–0.
- DEN – Floyd Little 2-yard run (Bobby Howfield kick), 9:48. Broncos 13–0.

**Fourth quarter**

- No scoring plays.

**Top passers**

- SDG – John Hadl – 8/20, 51 yards
- DEN – Steve Tensi – 15/32, 219 yards, TD, 2 INT

**Top rushers**

- SDG – John Hadl – 4 rushes, 23 yards
- DEN – Floyd Little – 10 rushes, 42 yards, TD

**Top receivers**

- SDG – Russ Smith – 2 receptions, 30 yards
- DEN – Al Denson – 6 receptions, 93 yards, TD

==== Week 9: at Kansas City Chiefs ====
Week Nine: San Diego Chargers at Kansas City Chiefs – Game summary

Quarter	1	2	3	4	Total
Chargers	3	0	0	0	**3**
**Chiefs**	0	10	10	7	**27**

at Municipal Stadium, Kansas City, Missouri

- Date: November 2
- Game time: 3:05 p.m. CST
- Game weather: 57 °F (13.9 °C), relative humidity 65%, wind 6 mph
- Game attendance: 51,104
- Referee: Bob Finley
- Box score

Game information

**First quarter**

- SDG – Dennis Partee 25-yard field goal, 5:11. Chargers 3–0. **Drive: 8 plays, 41 yards, 3:12.**

**Second quarter**

- KAN – Mike Garrett 5-yard run (Jan Stenerud kick), 7:50. Chiefs 7–3. **Drive: 11 plays, 80 yards, 6:13.**
- KAN – Jan Stenerud 30-yard field goal, 0:02. Chiefs 10–3. **Drive: 7 plays, 28 yards, 1:58.**

**Third quarter**

- KAN – Jan Stenerud 47-yard field goal, 3:33. Chiefs 13–3. **Drive: 6 plays, 18 yards, 3:55.**
- KAN – Frank Pitts 50-yard pass from Warren McVea (Jan Stenerud kick), 1:32. Chiefs 20–3. **Drive: 2 plays, 52 yards, 0:27.**

**Fourth quarter**

- KAN – Warren McVea 2-yard run (Jan Stenerud kick), 10:08. Chiefs 27–3. **Drive: 4 plays, 31 yards, 1:14.**

**Top passers**

- SDG – Marty Domres – 10/31, 132 yards, 5 INT
- KAN – Len Dawson – 17/24, 169 yards, 3 INT

**Top rushers**

- SDG – Russ Smith – 8 rushes, 30 yards
- KAN – Mike Garrett – 9 rushes, 46 yards, TD

**Top receivers**

- SDG – Rick Eber – 3 receptions, 66 yards
- KAN – Frank Pitts – 4 receptions, 99 yards, TD

==== Week 10: at Oakland Raiders ====
Week Ten: San Diego Chargers at Oakland Raiders – Game summary

Quarter	1	2	3	4	Total
Chargers	0	7	3	6	**16**
**Raiders**	0	14	0	7	**21**

at Oakland-Alameda County Coliseum, Oakland, California

- Date: November 16
- Game time: 1:06 p.m. PST
- Game weather: 58 °F (14.4 °C), relative humidity 83%, wind 12 mph
- Game attendance: 54,372
- Referee: Jack Reader
- Box score

Game information

**First quarter**

- No scoring plays.

**Second quarter**

- SDG – Speedy Duncan 72-yard interception return (Dennis Partee kick), 11:49. Chargers 7–0.
- OAK – Fred Biletnikoff 19-yard pass from Daryle Lamonica (George Blanda kick), 5:22. Tied 7–7. **Drive: 5 plays, 43 yards, 2:47.**
- OAK – Dan Conners 25-yard fumble return (George Blanda kick), 4:21. Raiders 14–7.

**Third quarter**

- SDG – Dennis Partee 18-yard field goal, 4:29. Raiders 14–10. **Drive: 15 plays, 70 yards, 5:03.**

**Fourth quarter**

- SDG – Dennis Partee 31-yard field goal, 13:22. Raiders 14–13. **Drive: 8 plays, 43 yards, 3:25.**
- SDG – Dennis Partee 14-yard field goal, 7:04. Chargers 16–14. **Drive: 7 plays, 53 yards, 3:01.**
- OAK – Warren Wells 80-yard pass from Daryle Lamonica (George Blanda kick), 5:41. Raiders 21–16. **Drive: 2 plays, 78 yards, 1:03.**

**Top passers**

- SDG – John Hadl – 12/32, 127 yards
- OAK – Daryle Lamonica – 15/29, 235 yards, 2 TD, 3 INT

**Top rushers**

- SDG – Dickie Post – 20 rushes, 113 yards
- OAK – Hewritt Dixon – 14 rushes, 64 yards

**Top receivers**

- SDG – Jeff Queen – 2 receptions, 59 yards
- OAK – Warren Wells – 2 receptions, 105 yards, TD

==== Week 11: vs. Denver Broncos ====
Week Eleven: Denver Broncos at San Diego Chargers – Game summary

Quarter	1	2	3	4	Total
Broncos	7	10	7	0	**24**
**Chargers**	14	3	21	7	**45**

at San Diego Stadium, San Diego, California

- Date: November 23
- Game weather: 60 °F (15.6 °C), relative humidity 53%, wind 7 mph
- Game attendance: 34,664
- Box score

Game information

**First quarter**

- DEN – Al Denson 6-yard pass from Steve Tensi (Bobby Howfield kick). Broncos 7–0.
- SDG – Dickie Post 7-yard run (Dennis Partee kick). Tied 7–7.
- SDG – Dickie Post 1-yard run (Dennis Partee kick). Chargers 14–7.

**Second quarter**

- DEN – Al Denson 38-yard pass from Steve Tensi (Bobby Howfield kick). Tied 14–14.
- SDG – Dennis Partee 33-yard field goal. Chargers 17–14.
- DEN – Bobby Howfield 22-yard field goal. Tied 17–17.

**Third quarter**

- SDG – Marty Domres 10-yard run (Dennis Partee kick). Chargers 24–17.
- SDG – Dickie Post 10-yard run (Dennis Partee kick). Chargers 31–17.
- DEN – John Embree 10-yard pass from Steve Tensi (Bobby Howfield kick). Chargers 31–24.
- SDG – Marty Domres 8-yard run (Dennis Partee kick). Chargers 38–24.

**Fourth quarter**

- SDG – Gene Foster 14-yard pass from Marty Domres (Dennis Partee kick). Chargers 45–24.

**Top passers**

- DEN – Steve Tensi – 19/26, 301 yards, 3 TD, INT
- SDG – Marty Domres – 11/20, 235 yards, TD, 2 INT

**Top rushers**

- DEN – Frank Quayle – 5 rushes, 22 yards
- SDG – Dickie Post – 17 rushes, 128 yards, 3 TD

**Top receivers**

- DEN – Al Denson – 6 receptions, 140 yards, 2 TD
- SDG – Russ Smith – 2 receptions, 69 yards

==== Week 12: at Houston Oilers ====
Week Twelve: San Diego Chargers at Houston Oilers – Game summary

Quarter	1	2	3	4	Total
**Chargers**	0	7	7	7	**21**
Oilers	7	10	0	0	**17**

at Astrodome, Houston, Texas

- Date: November 27
- Game weather: N/A (game played indoors)
- Game attendance: 40,065
- Box score

Game information

**First quarter**

- HOU – Pete Beathard 2-yard run (Roy Gerela kick). Oilers 7–0.

**Second quarter**

- SDG – Gary Garrison 23-yard pass from Marty Domres (Dennis Partee kick). Tied 7–7.
- HOU – Hoyle Granger 3-yard pass from Don Trull (Roy Gerela kick). Oilers 14–7.
- HOU – Roy Gerela 42-yard field goal. Oilers 17–7.

**Third quarter**

- SDG – Russ Smith 2-yard run (Dennis Partee kick). Oilers 17–14.

**Fourth quarter**

- SDG – Kenny Graham 11-yard interception return (Dennis Partee kick). Chargers 21–17.

**Top passers**

- SDG – John Hadl – 12/17, 144 yards
- HOU – Pete Beathard – 10/14, 91 yards, INT

**Top rushers**

- SDG – Marty Domres – 5 rushes, 34 yards
- HOU – Woody Campbell – 12 rushes, 37 yards

**Top receivers**

- SDG – Lance Alworth – 7 receptions, 85 yards
- HOU – Jim Beirne – 4 receptions, 41 yards

==== Week 13: vs. Boston Patriots ====
Week Thirteen: Boston Patriots at San Diego Chargers – Game summary

Quarter	1	2	3	4	Total
Patriots	0	3	0	15	**18**
**Chargers**	7	7	14	0	**28**

at San Diego Stadium, San Diego, California

- Date: December 7
- Game time: 1:00 p.m. PDT
- Game weather: 58 °F (14.4 °C), relative humidity 50%, wind 7 mph
- Game attendance: 33,146
- Referee: Bob Finley
- Box score

Game information

**First quarter**

- SDG – Dickie Post 4-yard run (Dennis Partee kick), 1:12. Chargers 7–0. **Drive: 14 plays, 54 yards, 8:11.**

**Second quarter**

- BOS – Gino Cappelletti 34-yard field goal, 6:41. Chargers 7–3. **Drive: 8 plays, 23 yards, 3:29.**
- SDG – Marty Domres 1-yard run (Dennis Partee kick), 0:56. Chargers 14–3. **Drive: 14 plays, 79 yards, 5:45.**

**Third quarter**

- SDG – Gary Garrison 17-yard pass from John Hadl (Dennis Partee kick), 5:33. Chargers 21–3. **Drive: 4 plays, 55 yards, 1:45.**
- SDG – Lance Alworth 76-yard pass from John Hadl (Dennis Partee kick), 0:30. Chargers 28–3. **Drive: 7 plays, 78 yards, 3:02.**

**Fourth quarter**

- BOS – Jim Nance 9-yard run (Gino Cappelletti kick), 9:59. Chargers 28–10. **Drive: 2 plays, 17 yards, 0:09.**
- BOS – Jim Nance 3-yard run (Kim Hammond run), 0:38. Chargers 28–18. **Drive: 8 plays, 64 yards, 1:39.**

**Top passers**

- BOS – Mike Taliaferro – 13/23, 169 yards, 4 INT
- SDG – John Hadl – 6/10, 176 yards, 2 TD, INT

**Top rushers**

- BOS – Jim Nance – 11 rushes, 58 yards, 2 TD
- SDG – Dickie Post – 20 rushes, 71 yards, TD

**Top receivers**

- BOS – Ron Sellers – 3 receptions, 102 yards
- SDG – Lance Alworth – 6 receptions, 147 yards, TD

==== Week 14: vs. Buffalo Bills ====
Week Fourteen: Buffalo Bills at San Diego Chargers – Game summary

Quarter	1	2	3	4	Total
Bills	0	0	0	6	**6**
**Chargers**	10	14	7	14	**45**

at San Diego Stadium, San Diego, California

- Date: December 14
- Game weather: 57 °F (13.9 °C), relative humidity 51%, wind 6 mph
- Game attendance: 47,582
- Box score

Game information

**First quarter**

- SDG – Gary Garrison 41-yard pass from John Hadl (Dennis Partee kick). Chargers 7–0.
- SDG – Dennis Partee 33-yard field goal. Chargers 10–0.

**Second quarter**

- SDG – Rick Eber 30-yard pass from Gene Foster (Dennis Partee kick). Chargers 17–0.
- SDG – Lance Alworth 1-yard pass from John Hadl (Dennis Partee kick). Chargers 24–0.

**Third quarter**

- SDG – Dickie Post 34-yard run (Dennis Partee kick). Chargers 31–0.

**Fourth quarter**

- SDG – Dickie Post 2-yard run (Dennis Partee kick). Chargers 38–0.
- SDG – Marty Domres 9-yard run (Dennis Partee kick). Chargers 45–0.
- BUF – Willie Grate 19-yard pass from Tom Sherman (kick failed). Chargers 45–6.

**Top passers**

- BUF – Jack Kemp – 16/33, 164 yards, 2 INT
- SDG – John Hadl – 16/29, 262 yards, 2 TD

**Top rushers**

- BUF – O. J. Simpson – 7 rushes, 27 yards
- SDG – Dickie Post – 19 rushes, 106 yards, 2 TD

**Top receivers**

- BUF – Marlin Briscoe – 6 receptions, 94 yards
- SDG – Lance Alworth – 7 receptions, 122 yards, TD

== Awards ==
Seven Chargers were in the West team for the AFL All-Star game, while five were named to the Associated Press All-AFL second team.

Player	Position	All-Star	AP 1st-team All-Pro	AP 2nd-team All-Pro
Lance Alworth	Flanker	Yes		Yes
Pete Barnes	Linebacker			Yes
Steve DeLong	Defensive end	Yes		
Willie Frazier	Tight end	Yes		
Kenny Graham	Safety	Yes		Yes
John Hadl	Quarterback	Yes		
Dickie Post	Running back	Yes		Yes
Walt Sweeney	Guard	Yes		Yes

=== Standings ===
AFL Western Division
	W	L	T	PCT	DIV	PF	PA	STK
Oakland Raiders	12	1	1	.923	7–1	377	242	W6
Kansas City Chiefs	11	3	0	.786	5–3	359	177	L1
San Diego Chargers	8	6	0	.571	2–6	288	276	W4
Denver Broncos	5	8	1	.385	3–5	297	344	W1
Cincinnati Bengals	4	9	1	.308	3–5	280	367	L5

Note: Tie games were not officially counted in the standings of the AFL.
