= List of Los Angeles Chargers seasons =

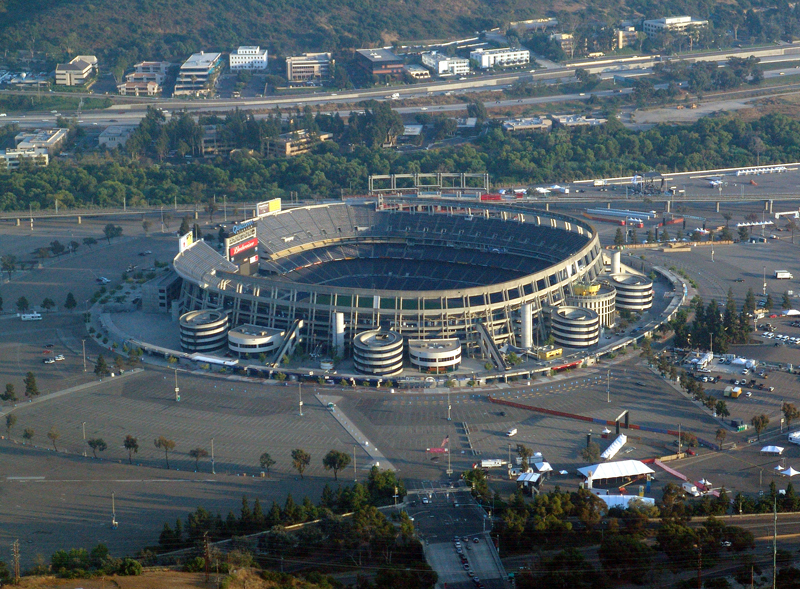
San Diego Stadium, where the Chargers played their home games from 1967 to 2016.

The Los Angeles Chargers are a professional American football team based in the Greater Los Angeles area. The Chargers compete in the National Football League (NFL) as a member club of the league's American Football Conference (AFC) West division. The club was founded in 1959 by Barron Hilton and played the 1960 season in Los Angeles as part of the American Football League (AFL). In the next season, the Chargers moved to San Diego. In 2017, the Chargers relocated back to the Greater Los Angeles area.

The franchise has experienced three major periods of success. The first was from 1960 to 1965, when the Chargers were AFL West champions five times and AFL champions once (in 1963). The second was from 1978 to 1982, when the Chargers had five consecutive winning records, four playoff appearances and three division championships. The most recent spell of sustained success ranged from 2004 to 2009, with the franchise reaching the playoffs five times in six years, each time as the AFC West champion. This run included their best regular season record, as they went 14–2 in 2006. Their only Super Bowl appearance was in 1994 (a loss to the San Francisco 49ers)

The Chargers have also experienced three notable periods of decline. For the 13 seasons between 1965 and 1977 the Chargers never reached the postseason; they failed to post a winning record through their first eight years in the NFL (1970–1977) and finished last in their division for four consecutive years from 1972 to 1975. From 1983 to 1991, they never placed higher than third in their division and did not make the playoffs. From 1996 to 2003, the team had no winning seasons, and posted their worst record to date, going 1–15 in 2000.

The Chargers have been division champions 14 times: five in the AFL West and nine in the AFC West. As of the end of the 2024 season, the Chargers have played 65 seasons, with a cumulative record of 494–495–11 in the regular season and 12–20 in the postseason.

== Seasons ==
Table legend
AFL champions (1960–1969) †	Conference champions ^{*}	Division champions ^{^}	Wild card berth ^{#}

Los Angeles/San Diego Chargers seasonal records
Season	Team	League	Conference	Division	Regular season				Postseason results	Awards (Note: Only Associated Press (AP) awards are included)	Head coaches
Season	Team	League	Conference	Division	Finish	W	L	T	Postseason results	Awards	Head coaches
Los Angeles Chargers
1960	1960	AFL		West^{^}	1st^{^}	10	4	0	Lost AFL Championship (at Oilers) 16–24		Sid Gillman
San Diego Chargers
1961	1961	AFL		West^{^}	1st^{^}	12	2	0	Lost AFL Championship (Oilers) 3–10	Earl Faison (ROY)	Sid Gillman
1962	1962	AFL		West	3rd	4	10	0			Sid Gillman
1963	1963	AFL^{†}		West^{^}	1st^{^}	11	3	0	Won AFL Championship (Patriots) 51–10	Tobin Rote (MVP)	Sid Gillman
1964	1964	AFL		West^{^}	1st^{^}	8	5	1	Lost AFL Championship (at Bills) 7–20		Sid Gillman
1965	1965	AFL		West^{^}	1st^{^}	9	2	3	Lost AFL Championship (Bills) 0–23		Sid Gillman
1966	1966	AFL		West	3rd	7	6	1			Sid Gillman
1967	1967	AFL		West	3rd	8	5	1		Dickie Post (OROY)	Sid Gillman
1968	1968	AFL		West	3rd	9	5	0			Sid Gillman
1969	1969	AFL		West	3rd	8	6	0			Sid Gillman (4–5) Charlie Waller (4–1)
1970	1970	NFL	AFC	West	3rd	5	6	3			Charlie Waller
1971	1971	NFL	AFC	West	3rd	6	8	0			Sid Gillman (4–6) Harland Svare (2–2)
1972	1972	NFL	AFC	West	4th	4	9	1			Harland Svare
1973	1973	NFL	AFC	West	4th	2	11	1			Harland Svare (1–6–1) Ron Waller (1–5)
1974	1974	NFL	AFC	West	4th	5	9	0		Don Woods (OROY)	Tommy Prothro
1975	1975	NFL	AFC	West	4th	2	12	0			Tommy Prothro
1976	1976	NFL	AFC	West	3rd	6	8	0			Tommy Prothro
1977	1977	NFL	AFC	West	3rd	7	7	0			Tommy Prothro
1978	1978	NFL	AFC	West	3rd	9	7	0			Tommy Prothro (1–3) Don Coryell (8–4)
1979	1979	NFL	AFC	West^{^}	1st^{^}	12	4	0	Lost Divisional playoffs (Oilers) 14–17	Johnny Sanders (EOY)	Don Coryell
1980	1980	NFL	AFC	West^{^}	1st^{^}	11	5	0	Won Divisional playoffs (Bills) 20–14; Lost AFC Championship (Raiders) 27–34		Don Coryell
1981	1981	NFL	AFC	West^{^}	1st^{^}	10	6	0	Won Divisional playoffs (at Dolphins) 41–38 (OT)^{[E]} Lost AFC Championship (at Bengals)^{[F]} 7–27		Don Coryell
1982 (Note: The 1982 season was reduced to nine games by a players strike; instead of standard divisional play, the AFC teams were placed together in one fourteen-team division.)	1982	NFL	AFC		5th^{#}	6	3	0	Won First round playoffs (at Steelers) 31–28; Lost Second round playoffs (at Dolphins) 13–34	Dan Fouts (OPOY)	Don Coryell
1983	1983	NFL	AFC	West	5th	6	10	0			Don Coryell
1984	1984	NFL	AFC	West	5th	7	9	0			Don Coryell
1985	1985	NFL	AFC	West	3rd	8	8	0			Don Coryell
1986	1986	NFL	AFC	West	5th	4	12	0		Leslie O'Neal (DROY)	Don Coryell (1–7) Al Saunders (3–5)
1987 (Note: The 1987 season was reduced to fifteen games by a players strike.)	1987	NFL	AFC	West	3rd	8	7	0			Al Saunders
1988	1988	NFL	AFC	West	4th	6	10	0			Al Saunders
1989	1989	NFL	AFC	West	5th	6	10	0			Dan Henning
1990	1990	NFL	AFC	West	4th	6	10	0			Dan Henning
1991	1991	NFL	AFC	West	5th	4	12	0			Dan Henning
1992	1992	NFL	AFC	West^{^}	1st^{^}	11	5	0	Won Wild Card playoffs (Chiefs) 17–0; Lost Divisional playoffs (at Dolphins) 0–31		Bobby Ross
1993	1993	NFL	AFC	West	4th	8	8	0			Bobby Ross
1994	1994	NFL	AFC^{*}	West^{^}	1st^{^}	11	5	0	Won Divisional playoffs (Dolphins) 22–21; Won AFC Championship (at Steelers) 17–13; Lost Super Bowl XXIX (vs. 49ers) 26–49		Bobby Ross
1995	1995	NFL	AFC	West	2nd^{#}	9	7	0	Lost Wild Card playoffs (Colts) 20–35		Bobby Ross
1996	1996	NFL	AFC	West	3rd	8	8	0			Bobby Ross
1997	1997	NFL	AFC	West	5th	4	12	0			Kevin Gilbride
1998	1998	NFL	AFC	West	5th	5	11	0			Kevin Gilbride (2–4) June Jones (3–7)
1999	1999	NFL	AFC	West	4th	8	8	0			Mike Riley
2000	2000	NFL	AFC	West	5th	1	15	0			Mike Riley
2001	2001	NFL	AFC	West	5th	5	11	0			Mike Riley
2002	2002	NFL	AFC	West	3rd	8	8	0			Marty Schottenheimer
2003	2003	NFL	AFC	West	4th	4	12	0			Marty Schottenheimer
2004	2004	NFL	AFC	West^{^}	1st^{^}	12	4	0	Lost Wild Card playoffs (Jets) 17–20 (OT)	Marty Schottenheimer (COY); Drew Brees (CBPOY)	Marty Schottenheimer
2005	2005	NFL	AFC	West	3rd	9	7	0		Shawne Merriman (DROY)	Marty Schottenheimer
2006	2006	NFL	AFC	West^{^}	1st^{^}	14	2	0	Lost Divisional playoffs (Patriots) 21–24	LaDainian Tomlinson (MVP, OPOY)	Marty Schottenheimer
2007	2007	NFL	AFC	West^{^}	1st^{^}	11	5	0	Won Wild Card playoffs (Titans) 17–6; Won Divisional playoffs (at Colts) 28–24; Lost AFC Championship (at Patriots) 12–21		Norv Turner
2008	2008	NFL	AFC	West^{^}	1st^{^}	8	8	0	Won Wild Card playoffs (Colts) 23–17 (OT); Lost Divisional playoffs (at Steelers) 24–35		Norv Turner
2009	2009	NFL	AFC	West^{^}	1st^{^}	13	3	0	Lost Divisional playoffs (Jets) 14–17		Norv Turner
2010	2010	NFL	AFC	West	2nd	9	7	0			Norv Turner
2011	2011	NFL	AFC	West	2nd	8	8	0			Norv Turner
2012	2012	NFL	AFC	West	2nd	7	9	0			Norv Turner
2013	2013	NFL	AFC	West	3rd^{#}	9	7	0	Won Wild Card playoffs (at Bengals) 27–10; Lost Divisional playoffs (at Broncos) 17–24	Philip Rivers (CBPOY)	Mike McCoy
2014	2014	NFL	AFC	West	3rd	9	7	0			Mike McCoy
2015	2015	NFL	AFC	West	4th	4	12	0			Mike McCoy
2016	2016	NFL	AFC	West	4th	5	11	0		Joey Bosa (DROY)	Mike McCoy
Los Angeles Chargers
2017	2017	NFL	AFC	West	2nd	9	7	0		Keenan Allen (CBPOY)	Anthony Lynn
2018	2018	NFL	AFC	West	2nd^{#}	12	4	0	Won Wild Card playoffs (at Ravens) 23–17; Lost Divisional playoffs (at Patriots) 28–41		Anthony Lynn
2019	2019	NFL	AFC	West	4th	5	11	0			Anthony Lynn
2020	2020	NFL	AFC	West	3rd	7	9	0		Justin Herbert (OROY)	Anthony Lynn
2021	2021	NFL	AFC	West	3rd	9	8	0			Brandon Staley
2022	2022	NFL	AFC	West	2nd^{#}	10	7	0	Lost Wild Card playoffs (at Jaguars) 30–31		Brandon Staley
2023	2023	NFL	AFC	West	4th	5	12	0			Brandon Staley (5–9) Giff Smith (0–3)
2024	2024	NFL	AFC	West	2nd^{#}	11	6	0	Lost Wild Card playoffs (at Texans) 12–32		Jim Harbaugh
2025	2025	NFL	AFC	West	2nd^{#}	11	6	0	Lost Wild Card playoffs (at Patriots) 3–16		Jim Harbaugh
Totals 1 AFL Championship 1 AFC Conference championship 15 division titles						505	501	11	1960–2025, regular season only		
Totals 1 AFL Championship 1 AFC Conference championship 15 division titles						12	21	—	1960–2025, postseason games only		
Totals 1 AFL Championship 1 AFC Conference championship 15 division titles						517	522	11	1960–2025, total for all games		
