= Bobby Burnett =

American football player (1943–2016)

No. 21, 24
- Position: Running back

Personal information
- Born: January 4, 1943; Clinton, Arkansas, U.S.
- Died: October 1, 2016 (aged 73); Marion, Illinois, U.S.
- Listed height: 6 ft 3 in (1.91 m)
- Listed weight: 210 lb (95 kg)

Career information
- High school: Smackover (Smackover, Arkansas)
- College: Arkansas (1964–1965)
- NFL draft: 1966: 10th round, 152nd overall pick
- AFL draft: 1966: 4th round, 33rd overall pick

Career history
- Buffalo Bills (1966–1967); Cincinnati Bengals (1968)*; Denver Broncos (1969); Las Vegas Cowboys (1969)
- * Offseason or practice squad member only

Awards and highlights
- AFL All-Star (1966); AFL Rookie of the Year (1966); National champion (1964); First-team All-SWC (1965)

Career AFL statistics
- Rushing yards: 871
- Rushing average: 3.7
- Receptions: 45
- Receiving yards: 533
- Total touchdowns: 8
- Stats at Pro Football Reference

Robert Clell Burnett (January 4, 1943 – October 1, 2016) was a college and professional American football player.

Originally a halfback from the University of Arkansas, Burnett in 1966, his first year with the Buffalo Bills of the American Football League (AFL), had a combined total of 1,185 yards rushing and receiving, with over 12 yards per catch and 4 touchdowns on 34 receptions. He had 766 yards on 187 rushes, with 4 rushing touchdowns. He was that year's AFL Rookie of the Year, and was also selected to the 1966 AFL All-Star team. He died of pancreatic cancer on October 1, 2016.

== See also ==
- List of American Football League players
