= American Football League Rookie of the Year =

In each year of its ten-year existence (1960–1969), numerous sports-news services named their choice for the American Football League's best first-year player. UPI selected a rookie for each of the ten seasons, while the Associated Press did selections from 1961 to 1966, which ended up with the same selections that UPI made. In 1967, AP instead selected Offensive and Defensive Rookie of the Years for the AFL, with the offensive choices matching the UPI selection.

== 1960 ==
ABNER HAYNES, halfback, Dallas Texans (UPI, TSN)

In 1960, though drafted by the NFL, Haynes chose to play for the American Football League's Dallas Texans, and led the AFL in rushing attempts, yards, and touchdowns in the league's first year. Haynes helped launch the AFL as the fledgling league's first Most Valuable Player, and its first Rookie of the Year (in 1961, all players in the league were technically rookies). He captured the AFL's first rushing crown with 875 yards, and also led the Texans in receiving, punt returns, and kickoff returns.

== 1961 ==
EARL FAISON, defensive end, San Diego Chargers (UPI, TSN, AP)

Despite being double and triple-teamed, Earl Faison was chosen as the AFL Rookie of the Year in 1961. The 6-foot-5, 260-pound Faison blew by opposing offensive lineman on his way to smashing American Football League quarterbacks as one of the original "Fearsome Foursome", and was chosen to the AFL All-Star team in 1961.

== 1962 ==
CURTIS McCLINTON, fullback, Dallas Texans (UPI, TSN)

McClinton had 604 Yards on 111 carries for a 5.4 yards per carry average and two touchdowns. He added 333 yards on 29 receptions and was a member of the 1962 AFL All-Star team.

== 1963 ==
BILLY JOE, fullback, Denver Broncos (UPI, TSN)

An eleventh-round draft choice by the Broncos, Joe had 646 yards on 154 carries for a 4.2 yards per carry average, four rushing touchdowns, and a reception for a touchdown.

== 1964 ==
MATT SNELL, fullback, New York Jets (UPI, TSN)

Selected in the third round in the NFL draft, Matt Snell was picked in the first round as the first player drafted by the AFL's New York franchise after new owner Sonny Werblin changed the team's name from the Titans of New York. Snell rolled up 948 yards on 215 carries, for a 4.4 yards per carry average, with an additional 393 yards on 56 receptions, with four touchdowns rushing and one receiving. He was also named to the 1964 AFL All-Star team.

== 1965 ==
JOE NAMATH, quarterback, New York Jets (UPI, TSN)

Choosing the American Football League's Jets (and $427,000) over the NFL, Namath was 164 of 340 for 2,220 yards and 18 touchdowns in his rookie season for the Jets, and was selected to the 1965 AFL All-Star team.

== 1966 ==
BOBBY BURNETT, halfback, Buffalo Bills (UPI, TSN)

Arkansas' Bobby Burnett had a combined total of 1,185 yards rushing and receiving at the halfback position, with over 12 yards per catch and 4 touchdowns on 34 receptions, and 766 yards on 187 rushes, with 4 rushing touchdowns. He was also selected to the 1966 AFL All-Star team.

== 1967 ==
- GEORGE WEBSTER, linebacker, Houston Oilers (UPI, TSN)
- Dickie Post, running back, San Diego Chargers (AP)

George Webster created the "roverback" position, as a linebacker with a defensive back's moves and speed. He started as a rookie and had 15 tackles in his first game. The Oilers' defense held opponents under 200 points in 1967, helping them win the East Division title. He averaged more than ten tackles a game and was first-team All-AFL in 1967.

AP selected Webster as their defensive Rookie of the Year and selected Dickie Post as AP AFL Offensive Rookie of the Year. Post rushed for 663 yards on 161 carries for seven touchdowns while catching 32 passes for 278 yards and returning 15 kicks for 371 yards.

== 1968 ==
- PAUL ROBINSON, halfback, Cincinnati Bengals (UPI, TSN)
- Dick Anderson, defensive back Miami Dolphins (Associated Press)
- George Atkinson, safety/return specialist, Oakland Raiders (Associated Press)

Paul Robinson played only one year at the University of Arizona, but in his first year as a professional, he gained 1,023 yards rushing and scored eight touchdowns. He was named to the 1968 All-AFL team and led the Western AFL All-Star team to victory over the Eastern All-Stars.

Associated Press awarded their AP AFL Defensive Rookie of the Year to Anderson and Atkinson, who each served as returners when not playing defense. Anderson intercepted eight passes and returned one for a touchdown. Atkinson returned 32 kicks for 802 yards along with 36 punts for 490 yards for two touchdowns. He also intercepted four passes with one going for a touchdown.

== 1969 ==
- GREG COOK, quarterback, Cincinnati Bengals (UPI, TSN, AP)
- Bill Bergey, Oakland Raiders (Associated Press)

The University of Cincinnati's 6-foot-4, 220-pound quarterback Greg Cook stayed in Cincinnati to play professional football. In his rookie year, he passed for 1,854 yards and 15 touchdowns. Injury prevented him from reaching his potential with the Bengals.

AP awarded their Defensive Rookie of the Year award to Bill Bergey, who recorded two interceptions.

== See also ==
- List of American Football League players
