= John Hadl =

American football player and coach (1940–2022)

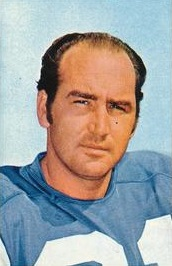
- Hadl in 1971

No. 21, 12
- Positions: Quarterback, punter

Personal information
- Born: February 15, 1940; Lawrence, Kansas, U.S.
- Died: November 30, 2022 (aged 82); Lawrence, Kansas, U.S.
- Listed height: 6 ft 1 in (1.85 m)
- Listed weight: 214 lb (97 kg)

Career information
- High school: Lawrence
- College: Kansas (1959–1961)
- NFL draft: 1962: 1st round, 10th overall pick
- AFL draft: 1962: 3rd round, 24th overall pick

Career history

Playing
- San Diego Chargers (1962–1972); Los Angeles Rams (1973–1974); Green Bay Packers (1974–1975); Houston Oilers (1976–1977)

Coaching
- Kansas (1978–1981); Quarterbacks coach (1978); Offensive coordinator (1979–1981); Los Angeles Rams (1982) Offensive coordinator; Denver Broncos (1983) Offensive coordinator & quarterbacks coach; Los Angeles Express (1984–1985) Head coach

Awards and highlights
- AFL champion (1963); NFL Man of the Year (1971); First-team All-Pro (1973); 2× Second-team All-AFL (1965, 1966); 2× Pro Bowl (1972, 1973); 4× AFL All-Star (1964, 1965, 1968, 1969); NFL passing yards leader (1971); NFL passing touchdowns leader (1971); 2× AFL passing yards leader (1965, 1968); AFL passing touchdowns leader (1968); Los Angeles Chargers Hall of Fame; 2× First-team All-American (1960, 1961); 2× First-team All-Big Eight (1960, 1961); Second-team All-Big Eight (1959); Kansas Jayhawks No. 21 retired

Career NFL/AFL statistics
- Passing attempts: 4,687
- Passing completions: 2,363
- Completion percentage: 50.4%
- TD–INT: 244–268
- Passing yards: 33,503
- Passer rating: 67.4
- Rushing yards: 1,112
- Rushing touchdowns: 16
- Stats at Pro Football Reference

Head coaching record
- Regular season: 13–23 (.361)
- Postseason: 1–1 (.500)
- Career: 14–24 (.368)
- Coaching profile at Pro Football Reference
- College Football Hall of Fame

John Willard Hadl (Pronounced: HAY-dull) (February 15, 1940 – November 30, 2022) was an American professional football player who was a quarterback for 16 years in the American Football League (AFL) and National Football League (NFL). He won an AFL championship with the San Diego Chargers in 1963. Hadl was named an AFL All-Star four times and was selected to two Pro Bowls. He was inducted into the Chargers Hall of Fame.

Hadl played college football for the Kansas Jayhawks. A two-time All-American, he was elected to the College Football Hall of Fame. Hadl played in three AFL title games with San Diego before the league's merger with the NFL. He finished his career with the Los Angeles Rams, the Green Bay Packers and the Houston Oilers. He also played as a punter for five seasons.

== Early life ==
Hadl was born in Lawrence, Kansas, to Jess and Judy Hadl. His father was a mechanic. Hadl attended Lawrence High School, where he was an all-state halfback.

== College career ==
Hadl enrolled at the University of Kansas, where he played for his hometown Jayhawks. After playing halfback on both offense and defense as a sophomore, he played quarterback for his last two years, and was selected as the school's Player of the Century. He was an All-American at halfback in 1960 and at quarterback in 1961.

Hadl was the first Kansas player to be picked twice for All-America (1960 and 1961) honors. Hadl also excelled as a defensive back, punt returner, and punter; he led the country with a 45.6-yard punting average in 1959. Hadl's No. 21 jersey is one of only three Kansas has retired. Hadl was picked for the all-conference team for three seasons, and wound up with 1,345 yards passing and 1,041 yards rushing. Hadl still holds two Kansas records: longest interception return, a 98-yard run against TCU and longest punt, 94 yards versus Oklahoma.

With Hadl running the offense, the Jayhawks were ranked in the top 20 during his junior and senior years, finishing 15–5–2. He wrapped up his Kansas career leading his team to a 33–7 win over Rice in the Bluebonnet Bowl. He was also named MVP in the East–West Shrine Game and the College All-Star Game.

== Professional career ==
=== San Diego Chargers ===
Hadl played at 6 ft 1 in (1.85 m) and 210 lb (95 kg). He joined the American Football League's San Diego Chargers in 1962, having decided to play with them over the Detroit Lions (who selected him in the first round (tenth overall) of the NFL draft).

Hadl played in each game of his first season, although his use was more often in the second half than the first despite starting ten of fourteen games. His first pass in the AFL was a fifteen-yard touchdown pass to Bobby Jackson near the end of a 30–21 loss to the Denver Broncos. He made his first start with the September 23 game against the Houston Oilers, although he went 1-of-4 for six yards before being taken out for Dick Wood. The Chargers had three quarterbacks during that season, including Jack Kemp. Hadl had his highs and lows during this time, such as throwing three touchdowns along with three interceptions (the first of three games with three interceptions) on 7-of-14 passes against Oakland in a 42–33 win. He won just one of his nine starts, doing so in a 11-of-24 effort for 161 yards, two touchdowns, and one interception game versus Oakland on December 2, 1962.

Although the Chargers won four games that year, they improved to eleven in 1963, owing to the acquisition of 35-year old Tobin Rote as the new starting quarterback. While Rote started each game, Hadl did take action in mop-up duty, throwing 28-of-64 for 502 combined yards and six touchdowns and interceptions. In the AFL championship game, Rote and Hadl both got to play substantially against Boston, as they blew out the Patriots 51–10, with Hadl going 7-of-11 for 132 yards with both a passing and a rushing touchdown. Hadl also made two punts for the Chargers, kicking two of them for 75 yards.

The following year, Hadl started eight of the fourteen games while Rote did the other six. Hadl went 6-2 while throwing for 2,157 yards on eighteen touchdowns and fifteen interceptions with a 53.6 completion percentage, and he was named an AFL All-Star. However, in the 1964 AFL championship game, it was Rote who started against the Buffalo Bills and old teammate Kemp, now quarterbacking the opponent. After Rote threw a miserable 10-of-26 for 118 yards and a touchdown with a hobbled receiving corps (Lance Alworth and Keith Lincoln each suffered injury), Hadl was put in, but he went 3-of-10 for 31 yards and an interception as the Chargers lost 20–7. Hadl's punting duties increased, as he punted 62 times for 2,447 yards, with one of the kicks going 71 yards.

In 1965, he was named San Diego's starting quarterback and led the team to a 9–2–3 record while throwing 2,798 yards (a league high) for twenty touchdowns and 21 interceptions and a 50.0 completion percentage, all good for a second straight AFL-All Star appearance. Hadl made his third and final appearance in the AFL championship game that year. In his only start in said game, facing the Bills again, Hadl threw 11-of-23 for 140 yards and two interceptions as the Chargers were trounced 23–0. Hadl made punts for the second and last regular time, punting 38 times for 1,544 yards. Hadl would punt just three times for a hundred yards over the course of two separate seasons.

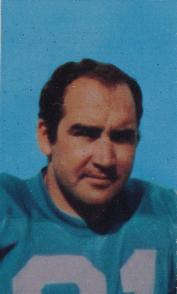
Hadl in 1969

The following year, he started twelve of fourteen games (Steve Tensi started the other two). Hadl went 7–4–1 while throwing 2,846 yards for 23 touchdowns and fourteen interceptions for a 53.3 completion percentage, although the Chargers third-ranked offense was not enough for a playoff spot for the first time in four years. Hadl began a streak during the fifth game of the season. On October 8, he threw a touchdown pass against the New York Jets. For the rest of the season, Hadl would throw for at least one touchdown pass, and the streak would continue into the next season - his nineteen-game streak (October 8, 1966 - November 19, 1967) with at least one touchdown pass would be the longest streak by a quarterback in the American Football League. Hadl played in each game of the 1967 season, going 8–5–1 for 3,365 yards with 24 touchdowns and 22 interceptions while having a 50.8 completion percentage, and he led the league in yards gained per pass completion with 15.5. He improved further in 1968, leading the league in completions, attempts, yards (3,473), touchdowns (27), and interceptions (32, which was a career high) while having a 47.3 completion percentage and an All-Star selection. Despite going 9–5, it was only good enough for third place in the Western Division. In the final season of the AFL in 1969, the Chargers were a team in turmoil. Famed coach (and future member of the Pro Football Hall of Fame) Sid Gillman resigned due to health problems after going 4–5. Hadl played in ten games while Marty Domres started four games, and Hadl won five of his starts. He passed for 2,253 yards with ten touchdowns and eleven interceptions for a 48.8 completion percentage, and Hadl was named an AFL All-Star once again. In the AFL All-Star Game, he was named Most Valuable Player.

The Chargers had their fortunes dwindle in the prevailing years after the AFL–NFL merger, as they did not have another winning season until 1978. Hadl quarterbacked San Diego for the first three of those seasons. In 1970, he went 4–5–3 while passing for 2,388 yards with 22 touchdowns and fifteen interceptions for a 49.5 completion percentage. He had prime numbers in the following year, as he led the league in completions, attempts, yards (3,075), touchdowns (21), and yards per game (219.6) while throwing for 25 interceptions and a 54.1 completion percentage with a 6–8 record. Hadl became the second quarterback in history to lead two different leagues in passing yards (the first was Otto Graham), and it was third time in six years (1965, 1968) that he had led in passing.

In his final year with the Chargers in 1972, he went 4–9–1, passing for 2,449 yards with fifteen touchdowns and 26 interceptions (a league high) while having a 51.4 completion percentage and a Pro Bowl selection.

=== Los Angeles Rams ===
Hadl was traded to the Los Angeles Rams in January 1973 for defensive end Coy Bacon and running back Bob Thomas. In his only full season with the Rams, he had his first winning season since 1968 and first playoff appearance since 1965 as he led them to a 12–2 record, passing for 2,008 yards with 22 touchdowns and eleven interceptions while having a 52.3 completion percentage. He was named the National Football Conference (NFC) Player of the Year by UPI and selected to the Pro Bowl that season. In the playoffs that year, the Rams faced the Dallas Cowboys (10–4) at Texas Stadium, as the NFL playoffs at the time only included eight teams with rotated hosting duties. He went 7-of-23 for 133 yards with an interception as they lost 27–16; a late fourth quarter rally in which the Rams cut a 17-point deficit to one point was blunted when Drew Pearson caught a short pass and went 83 yards for a touchdown when two Ram defenders collided.

The following year was a turning point for two franchises. Hadl started the first five games for the Rams, then was replaced by James Harris during an upset loss to the Green Bay Packers in Milwaukee to fall to 3–2. The next game, a 37–14 home win over rival San Francisco, was the first NFL start for Harris, and 34-year-old Hadl was traded two days later to Green Bay for five draft picks—first and second-round picks for 1975 and 1976, as well as a third-round pick in 1975.

=== Green Bay Packers ===
Reportedly, head coach and general manager Dan Devine felt that an experienced quarterback was the only thing standing between the Packers and only their second playoff appearance since 1967, and it came about after an attempted trade for Archie Manning and the New Orleans Saints fell through. The trade turned out to be an unmitigated disaster; it is reckoned as one of the worst (if not the worst) trades for a starting quarterback in NFL history, at least in terms of relevance. Devine had led them to a combined record of 19—19–4 in his first three seasons, which included a playoff loss in 1972. The Packers finished 6–8 in 1974 and Devine left for Notre Dame, which left the door open for Bart Starr to take over as head coach. While he would lead them to one playoff win as a coach, Starr had just three of nine seasons with eight wins.

At the same time, the Rams used the picks acquired in the trade to acquire many of the players that allowed them to dominate the NFC West for the rest of the 1970s and lead them to an appearance in Super Bowl XIV. In later years, when asked for his thoughts on the infamous deal, Hadl himself expressed the surprise he felt, in 1974, at being sent to Green Bay: "I really didn't believe it... I didn't think anyone would be that desperate."

Meanwhile, with a combined record of 6–5 on two teams, Hadl threw for 1,752 yards with eight touchdowns and fourteen interceptions and a 47.5 completion percentage. His only full season with the Packers was in 1975, and with a miserable front line, he threw for six touchdowns and 21 interceptions for 2,095 yards and a 54.1 completion percentage while being sacked 35 times in a 4–9 season.

=== Houston Oilers ===
Hadl moved to the Houston Oilers in 1976, mostly in mop up duty for starter Dan Pastorini. He started six games over two seasons and won just once while throwing seven total touchdowns to eleven interceptions for 710 yards.

Despite his tenure with Green Bay, Hadl finished with a starting record of 82–76–9 in his professional career. At the time of his retirement, Hadl was sixth all time in wins at the quarterback position with 82. With the exception of Roman Gabriel, each of those quarterbacks are in the Pro Football Hall of Fame. He ranks 40th in all-time wins, although he has more wins than Hall of Famers that played in his era such as Sonny Jurgensen, Joe Namath, and George Blanda.

Hadl holds the NFL record for the most tied games (nine) by a starting quarterback. Hadl wore No. 21 for nearly his entire NFL career, aside from his first season with Green Bay when he briefly wore No. 12. He was the last regular starting quarterback to wear a uniform number greater than No. 19 before the NFL adopted a rigid uniform numbering system in 1973. Hadl was still on the top ten of most touchdowns thrown by a quarterback as late as 1999 (over twenty years after retirement), with him and two others in that list not being members of the Hall of Fame (Dave Krieg and Boomer Esiason being the others), as his former peak of fifth has receded to 26 with the advent of increased passing in subsequent years.

Hadl was inducted into the Chargers Hall of Fame in 1983. The Professional Football Researchers Association named him to the PFRA Hall of Very Good Class of 2006.

== Coaching and administrative career ==
Upon retiring as a player after the 1977 season, Hadl returned to his alma mater and served as quarterback coach under Bud Moore at the University of Kansas in 1978. From 1979 to 1981, he remained at KU, moving up to offensive coordinator under new head coach Don Fambrough. At this time, he was pegged as the "unnamed assistant football coach" who provided improper benefits to Kansas recruits in the early 1980s, resulting in the NCAA imposing sanctions on the football program. Hadl consistently denied any wrongdoing and his tenure with Kansas athletics hasn't yielded any suggestion of rules violations.

Unable to return to the program after 1981, he moved on to the Los Angeles Rams as an assistant coach in 1982. In 1983, he joined the Denver Broncos as the quarterback coach, where he was tasked with turning highly touted draft pick John Elway into a franchise quarterback.

After one season, Hadl decided to move on and became the head coach of the Los Angeles Express of the United States Football League (USFL) during 1984 and 1985, compiling a record of 13–23 in the regular season, 1–1 in the postseason. Hadl would later call this decision a "career blunder."

Hadl ended his career as associate athletic director at the University of Kansas.

== Death ==
Hadl died on November 30, 2022, at the age of 82.

== Career statistics ==
Legend
	Won the AFL Championship
	Led the league
**Bold**	Career high

=== Regular season statistics ===
Year	Team	Games			Passing								Rushing			
Year	Team	GP	GS	Record	Cmp	Att	Pct	Yds	Avg	TD	Int	Rtg	Att	Yds	Avg	TD
1962	SD	14	10	1–9	107	260	41.2	1,632	6.3	15	24	43.3	**40**	139	3.5	1
1963	SD	14	0	—	28	64	43.8	502	7.8	6	6	63.4	8	26	3.3	0
1964	SD	14	8	6–2	147	274	53.6	2,157	7.9	18	15	78.7	20	70	3.5	1
1965	SD	14	14	9–2–3	174	348	50.0	2,798	**8.0**	20	21	71.3	28	91	3.3	1
1966	SD	14	12	7–4–1	200	375	53.3	2,846	7.6	23	14	83.0	38	95	2.5	2
1967	SD	14	14	8–5–1	217	427	50.8	3,365	7.9	24	22	74.5	37	107	2.9	**3**
1968	SD	14	14	9–5	208	**440**	47.3	**3,473**	7.9	**27**	**32**	64.5	23	14	0.6	2
1969	SD	14	10	5–5	158	324	48.8	2,253	7.0	10	11	67.8	26	109	4.2	2
1970	SD	14	12	4–5–3	162	327	49.5	2,388	7.3	22	15	77.1	28	**188**	**6.7**	1
1971	SD	14	14	6–8	**233**	431	**54.1**	3,075	7.1	21	25	68.9	18	75	4.2	1
1972	SD	14	14	4–9–1	190	370	51.4	2,449	6.6	15	26	56.7	22	99	4.5	1
1973	LA	14	14	12–2	135	258	52.3	2,008	7.8	22	11	**88.8**	14	5	0.4	0
1974	LA	6	5	3–2	53	115	46.1	680	5.9	5	6	57.9	11	28	2.5	0
1974	GB	8	6	3–3	89	184	48.4	1,072	5.8	3	8	54.0	8	-3	-0.4	0
1975	GB	14	13	4–9	191	353	54.1	2,095	5.9	6	21	52.8	20	47	2.4	0
1976	HOU	14	4	1–3	60	113	53.1	634	5.6	7	8	60.9	7	11	1.6	0
1977	HOU	14	2	0–2	11	24	48.5	76	3.2	0	3	13.9	3	11	3.7	1
Career		224	166	82–75–9	2,363	4,687	50.4	33,503	7.1	244	268	67.4	351	1,112	3.2	16

=== Postseason statistics ===
Year	Team	Games			Passing								Rushing			
Year	Team	GP	GS	Record	Cmp	Att	Pct	Yds	Avg	TD	Int	Rtg	Att	Yds	Avg	TD
1963	SD	1	0	—	7	11	63.6	132	12.0	1	0	135.4	1	1	1.0	1
1964	SD	1	0	—	3	10	30.0	31	3.1	0	1	0.4	1	13	13.0	0
1965	SD	1	1	0–1	11	23	47.8	140	6.1	0	2	31.1	8	24	3.0	0
1973	LA	1	1	0–1	7	23	30.4	133	5.8	0	1	33.4	2	10	5.0	0
Career		4	2	0–2	28	67	41.8	436	6.5	1	4	44.1	12	48	4.0	1

== See also ==
- List of American Football League players
- List of most consecutive starts and games played by National Football League players
