= Dickie Post =

American football player (born 1945)

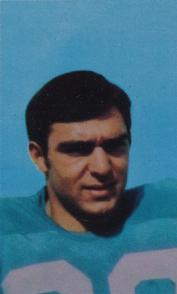
- Post c. 1969

No. 22, 23, 2
- Position: Running back

Personal information
- Born: September 27, 1945 (age 81); San Pedro, California, U.S.
- Listed height: 5 ft 9 in (1.75 m)
- Listed weight: 190 lb (86 kg)

Career information
- High school: Pauls Valley (Pauls Valley, Oklahoma)
- College: Houston (1964–1966)
- NFL draft: 1967: 4th round, 94th overall pick

Career history
- San Diego Chargers (1967–1970); Denver Broncos (1971); Houston Oilers (1971)

Awards and highlights
- 2× AFL All-Star (1967, 1969); AFL Offensive Rookie of the Year (1967)

Career NFL/AFL statistics
- Rushing yards: 2,605
- Rushing average: 4.3
- Receptions: 96
- Receiving yards: 903
- Total touchdowns: 19
- Stats at Pro Football Reference

Richard M. Post (born September 27, 1945) is an American former professional football player who was a running back in the American Football League (AFL) and National Football League (NFL).

== College career ==
Post played college football for the Houston Cougars. In 1974, he was inducted into the University of Houston Athletics Hall of Honor.

=== Career statistics ===
Season	Team	Rushing & receiving						
Season	Team	Att	Yds	Avg	TD	Receptions	Yards	TD
1964	Houston	116	528	4.6	5	12	100	0
1965	Houston	156	630	4.0	3	13	71	0
1966	Houston	185	1,061	5.7	5	15	90	3
Career		457	2,219	4.9	13	40	261	3

== Pro career ==
Post was drafted in the fourth round of the 1967 draft by the AFL's San Diego Chargers after Bum Phillips (hired to serve as defensive coordinator for the team after serving the position for the University of Houston the previous two years) put in a good word for him to head coach Sid Gillman. Originally making the team as a flanker for Lance Alworth, Post found himself asked to take over from an aging and injured Paul Lowe in the backfield. Post served as a both a running back and kick returner for the season. His first carries came in the second game of the season versus Houston after Jim Allison got knocked out. However, Post's breakthrough game came against Buffalo, where he rushed for 121 yards on 20 carries with his first touchdown in his career in a 37–17 win. He had his first multi-touchdown game against Denver, rushing for two touchdowns on 15 carries for 70 yards before catching two passes for 68 yards and a touchdown reception in a 38–21 victory. In total, he rushed 161 times for 663 yards for seven touchdowns while catching 32 passes for 278 yards for a touchdown and returned 15 kicks for 371 yards. At the end of the year, he was the UPI choice for AFL Rookie of the Year and selected as an AFL All-Star. Post was known as one of pro football's most elusive backs. Post continued his stretch for his second season, rushing for 140 yards on 16 carries on opening day. He rushed for 758 yards on 151 carries (averaging five yards a carry) but only scored three touchdowns. In 2008, NFL Films named him the ninth most elusive runner of all time, as served by his 193-pound frame. Post saved his best for his third season. He rushed for 873 yards on 182 carries for six touchdowns, with his best game being a three-touchdown game against Denver; over half of his yardage came in the final five games of the season (which came after the retirement of Gillman), which included three 100-yard rushing games as he won the AFL rushing title after having finished in the top five in each of his first two years and garnered an All-Star selection in the final season of the AFL.

Post declined soon after due to his problems with his knees, as he stated he had five operations in the span of five years. In 1970, he missed the first five games of the season and rushed 74 times for 225 yards with one touchdown. He played the 1971 season with both the Denver Broncos and Houston Oilers., rushing a total of 40 times for 86 yards. He scored his last touchdown as a professional against Oakland on a reception on October 10.

== NFL/AFL career statistics ==
Legend
	Led the league
**Bold**	Career high

Year	Team	Games		Rushing					Receiving				
Year	Team	GP	GS	Att	Yds	Avg	Lng	TD	Rec	Yds	Avg	Lng	TD
1967	SDG	13	11	161	663	4.1	**67**	**7**	**32**	**278**	8.7	**66**	**1**
1968	SDG	13	12	151	758	**5.0**	62	3	18	165	9.2	23	0
1969	SDG	14	11	**182**	**873**	4.8	60	6	24	235	9.8	46	0
1970	SDG	9	6	74	225	3.0	18	1	13	113	8.7	30	0
1971	DEN	6	1	18	44	2.4	16	0	4	46	11.5	15	**1**
1971	HOU	7	2	22	42	1.9	10	0	5	66	**13.2**	28	0
		62	43	608	2,605	4.3	67	17	96	903	9.4	66	2
