= Mike Mercer (American football) =

American football player (1935–2024)

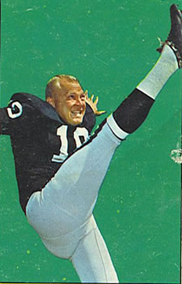

No. 18, 10, 15, 7, 38
- Positions: Placekicker, punter

Personal information
- Born: November 21, 1935; Algona, Iowa, U.S.
- Died: March 24, 2024 (aged 88); Redmond, Oregon, U.S.
- Listed height: 6 ft 0 in (1.83 m)
- Listed weight: 220 lb (100 kg)

Career information
- High school: Dubuque (Dubuque, Iowa)
- College: Minnesota (1953); Hardin-Simmons (1958–1959); Northern Arizona (1960)
- NFL draft: 1961: 15th round, 197th overall pick

Career history
- Minnesota Vikings (1961–1962); St. Louis Cardinals (1963)*; Oakland Raiders (1963–1966); Kansas City Chiefs (1966); Buffalo Bills (1967–1968); Green Bay Packers (1968–1969); San Diego Chargers (1970)
- * Offseason or practice squad member only

Awards and highlights
- AFL champion (1966); AFL All-Star (1967)

Career NFL/AFL statistics
- Field goals/attempts: 102 / 195
- Field goal %: 52.3
- Extra points: 288 / 295
- Punts: 308
- Punting yards: 12,473
- Longest punt: 77
- Stats at Pro Football Reference

Michael Mercer (November 21, 1935 – March 24, 2024) was an American professional football player who was a kicker and punter for six teams from 1961 to 1970 in the National Football League (NFL) and American Football League (AFL). He played college football for the Hardin-Simmons Cowboys and, in 1960, the Arizona State College Lumberjacks in Flagstaff, Arizona. (Note: Because NAU was known at this time as Arizona State College, sources may state he attended Arizona State University, which changed its name in 1958.) In the AFL, Mercer played for the Oakland Raiders, the Kansas City Chiefs and the Buffalo Bills. He was a member of the Chiefs' 1966 AFL championship team that played in the first AFL–NFL World Championship Game, now known as the Super Bowl.

Mercer's 9-yard field goal attempt was blocked by Larry "Wildman" Eisenhauer and recovered by Don Webb, with about 3 minutes left, in the Oakland Raiders 43–43 tie with the Boston Patriots on October 16, 1964. On December 22, 1963, Mercer kicked a 4th quarter 39-yard field goal to break a 49–49 tie with the Oilers and give the Raiders a 52–49 win. In that same game Mercer was 7 for 7 on extra points. Mercer led the Raiders in scoring in 1964 with 79 points, hitting 15 field goals and all 34 extra point attempts.

Mercer died on March 24, 2024, at the age of 88.

== See also ==
- List of American Football League players
