= Tom Williams (defensive lineman) =

American football player (born 1948)

No. 87
- Positions: Defensive end, Defensive tackle

Personal information
- Born: July 21, 1948 (age 78); Hempstead, New York, U.S.
- Listed height: 6 ft 4 in (1.93 m)
- Listed weight: 250 lb (113 kg)

Career information
- High school: Cordova (Rancho Cordova, California)
- College: UC Davis (1967-1969)
- NFL draft: 1970: 2nd round, 42nd overall pick

Career history
- San Diego Chargers (1970–1971)

Career NFL statistics
- Fumble recoveries: 1
- Sacks: 1
- Stats at Pro Football Reference

William Thomas Williams (born July 21, 1948) is an American former professional football player who was a defensive end in the National Football League (NFL) for the San Diego Chargers. He played college football for the UC Davis Aggies.
