= Lance Alworth =

American football player (born 1940)

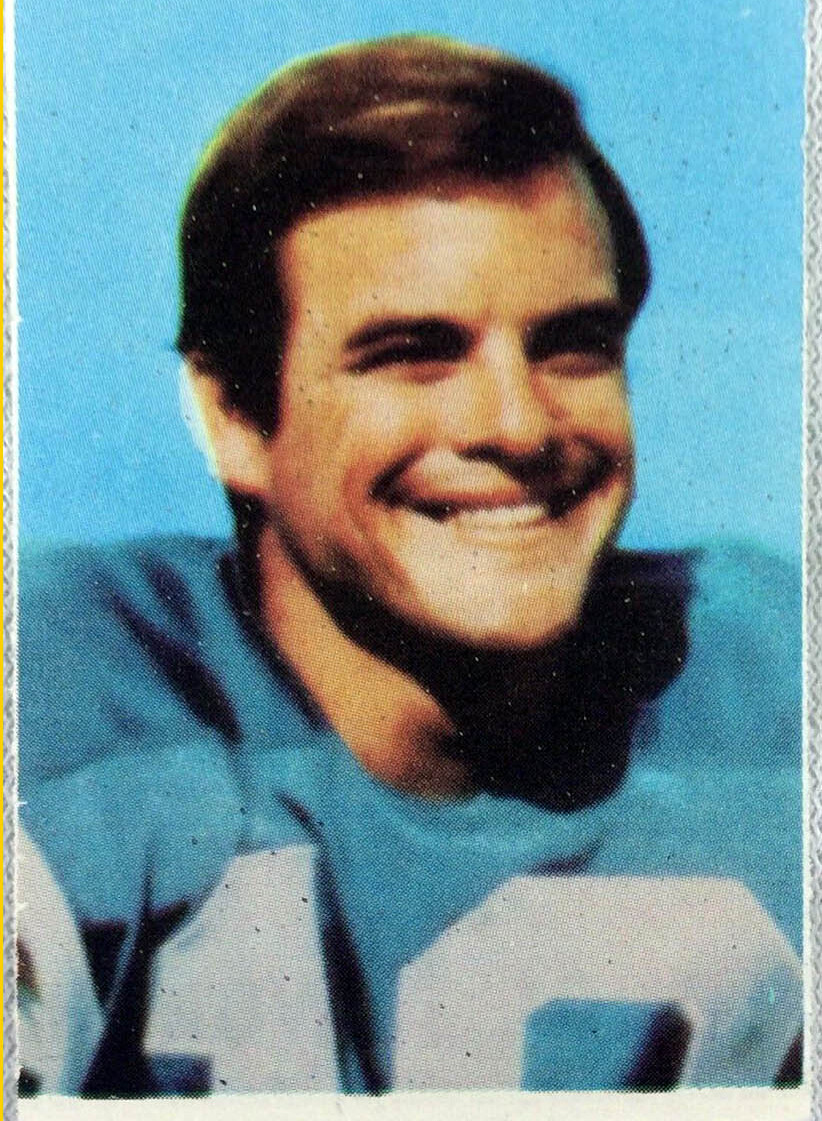
- Alworth on a 1969 football card

No. 24, 19
- Position: Wide receiver

Personal information
- Born: August 3, 1940 (age 86); Houston, Texas, U.S.
- Listed height: 6 ft 0 in (1.83 m)
- Listed weight: 184 lb (83 kg)

Career information
- High school: Brookhaven (Brookhaven, Mississippi)
- College: Arkansas (1959–1961)
- NFL draft: 1962: 1st round, 8th overall pick
- AFL draft: 1962: 2nd round, 9th overall pick

Career history
- San Diego Chargers (1962–1970); Dallas Cowboys (1971–1972)

Awards and highlights
- Super Bowl champion (VI); AFL champion (1963); AFL Player of the Year (1963); Joe F. Carr Trophy (1968); 6× First-team All-AFL (1963–1968); Second-team All-AFL (1969); 7× AFL All-Star (1963–1969); 3× AFL receiving yards leader (1965, 1966, 1968); 3× AFL receptions leader (1966, 1968, 1969); 3× AFL receiving touchdowns leader (1964–1966); NFL 75th Anniversary All-Time Team; NFL 100th Anniversary All-Time Team; AFL All-Time Team; Los Angeles Chargers Hall of Fame; Los Angeles Chargers No. 19 retired; First-team All-American (1961); Third-team All-American (1960); 2× First-team All-SWC (1960, 1961); Second-team All-SWC (1959)

Career AFL + NFL statistics
- Receptions: 542
- Receiving yards: 10,266
- Receiving touchdowns: 85
- Stats at Pro Football Reference
- Pro Football Hall of Fame
- College Football Hall of Fame

Lance Dwight Alworth (born August 3, 1940), nicknamed "Bambi", is an American former professional football wide receiver who played for the San Diego Chargers of the American Football League (AFL) and National Football League (NFL), and the Dallas Cowboys of the NFL. Often considered one of the greatest wide receivers of all time, he played for 11 seasons, from 1962 through 1972, and was elected to the Pro Football Hall of Fame in 1978. He was the first player inducted whose playing career was principally in the AFL. Alworth is also a member of the College Football Hall of Fame. His teammates called him Bambi because he had a baby face and could run like a deer.

== Early life ==
Born in Houston, Texas, to Dick and Beth Alworth, Lance Alworth was the second of two children. His sister Ann was fast enough in the 50- and 75-yard dashes in track to be invited to the Olympic Games trials, though she declined the invitation. He was raised in Hog Chain, Mississippi, a small community in Lincoln County.

Alworth was a gifted athlete; the Jackson Clarion-Ledger reported that he had struck a 400-foot home run while playing Little League Baseball as a twelve year old. He played football at Brookhaven High School. While in high school, Alworth earned 15 letters. After high school, he was offered baseball contracts by the New York Yankees and the Pittsburgh Pirates, but chose to play college football instead.

== College career ==
At Arkansas, the six-foot (1.83 m), 180-pound (82 kg) Alworth was a flanker who led all colleges in punt return yardage in 1960 and 1961. He also was a track star competing in the long jump and running the 100 and 220-yard dashes (in 9.6 seconds and 21.2 seconds, respectively). Alworth was a three-time Academic All-American, graduating with a degree in marketing as a pre-law student. In 1962, Alworth was on multiple All-American teams: Look magazine, Associated Press, United Press International and Coaches. Alworth was a key member of Arkansas teams that won, or shared, three consecutive Southwest Conference championships between 1959 and 1961, winning 25 games in that time span. The 1959 team won the 1960 Gator Bowl over Georgia Tech. Alworth was the MVP of the 1961 Cotton Bowl Classic, even though Arkansas lost the game, after he returned a punt for a touchdown. It would be the last time a punt was returned for a touchdown in the Cotton Bowl for fifty-one years until another Razorback, Joe Adams, returned a punt for a score in the 2012 Cotton Bowl Classic. He is a member of the Pi Kappa Alpha fraternity. Alworth is a member of the University of Arkansas Hall of Honor and the Arkansas Sports Hall of Fame; he was named to the University of Arkansas' 1960s All-Decade Team, and the school's All-Century Team in 1994.

== Professional career ==
=== San Diego Chargers ===
Alworth was chosen in the first round (eighth overall) of the 1962 NFL draft by the San Francisco 49ers. The American Football League's Oakland Raiders selected him with their first pick (ninth overall) in the second round of the 1962 AFL draft. The Raiders traded his rights to the San Diego Chargers in return for halfback Bo Roberson, quarterback Hunter Enis, and offensive tackle Gene Selawski. Alworth opted to sign with the Chargers instead of the 49ers. The Chargers kept Alworth at flanker. His slender build, speed, grace, and leaping ability earned him the nickname "Bambi."

In his rookie season, Alworth had just 10 receptions in 4 games (though three were for touchdowns). His second year was a different story, as he set franchise records in receptions (61), yards (1,205), and touchdowns (11), earning the UPI's AFL Most Valuable Player award. He had 4 receptions for 77 yards, including a 48-yard touchdown, in San Diego's AFL championship win over the Boston Patriots. He was selected as an AFL Western Division All-Star for the first of seven consecutive seasons, as well as an AFL All-League flanker for the first of six seasons, selected by his peers from 1963 to 1966, and by newspaper wire services from 1967 to 1968.

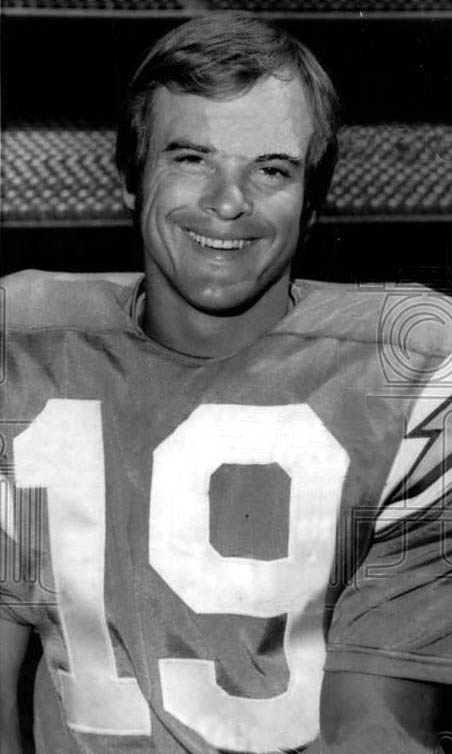
Alworth c. 1970

Over the next six seasons (1964–1969), Alworth broke his own franchise receiving records several times, and also led the league in receptions, receiving yards, receiving touchdowns, and total touchdowns three times each. He shattered the record for most consecutive seasons with over 1,000 receiving yards (7, previously 3, now held by Jerry Rice and Mike Evans with 11), and was the first player with back-to-back seasons averaging 100+ receiving yards per game, both of which led the league. The 1966 season was particularly noteworthy, because he led the league in five categories. He still shares the record for the most regular-season games with 200+ yards receiving (5), and had a franchise-record streak of 96 consecutive games with a reception.

Alworth formed a formidable tandem with Chargers quarterback John Hadl, and is considered by many to be the best wide receiver in all professional football during the 1960s. He is a member of the AFL All-Time Team. He was the first of only a few American Football League stars to be featured on the cover of Sports Illustrated, which like other media of the 1960s, showed a distinct bias for the NFL. Sports Illustrated even went so far as to declare Alworth the "Top Pro Receiver" in December 1965, this at a time when many claimed the AFL had inferior players. Alworth's productivity sharply declined in 1970 (35 catches for 608 yards), and he was traded to Dallas at the end of the season. See below for his numerous franchise records with the Chargers.

=== Dallas Cowboys ===
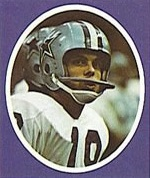
Alworth c. 1971

On May 19, 1971, Alworth was traded to the Dallas Cowboys, for his final two seasons. In exchange, the Chargers received Tony Liscio, Pettis Norman, and Ron East.

In Super Bowl VI following the 1971 season, he scored the game's first touchdown, which was a 7-yard touchdown pass from Roger Staubach in the Cowboys' 24–3 victory over the Miami Dolphins. Alworth would later call the two receptions he made in Super Bowl VI (one that converted a third and long and the other for the touchdown) the two most important catches of his career.

Alworth was frustrated with the run-first offense employed by the Cowboys; head coach Tom Landry used him primarily as a blocker. Alworth later commented, "The two years I spent in Dallas completely destroyed my enthusiasm." Though Landry expressed an interest in having him back for a third season, Alworth announced his retirement on July 2, 1973.

== NFL career statistics ==
Legend
	Won the AFL championship
	Won the Super Bowl
	Led the league
**Bold**	Career high

=== Regular season ===
Year	Team	Games		Receiving						Rushing					Fum
Year	Team	GP	GS	Rec	Yds	Y/R	Y/G	Lng	TD	Att	Yds	Y/A	Lng	TD	Fum
1962	SD	4	4	10	226	22.6	56.5	67	3	1	17	17.0	17	0	0
1963	SD	14	14	61	1,205	19.8	86.1	**85**	11	2	14	7.0	21	0	0
1964	SD	12	12	61	1,235	20.2	95.0	82	13	3	**60**	**20.0**	**35**	**2**	**3**
1965	SD	14	14	69	**1,602**	**23.2**	**114.4**	**85**	**14**	3	–12	–4.0	–1	0	2
1966	SD	13	13	**73**	1,383	18.9	106.4	78	13	3	10	3.3	4	0	0
1967	SD	11	11	52	1,010	19.4	91.8	71	9	1	5	5.0	5	0	0
1968	SD	14	14	68	1,312	19.3	93.7	80	10	3	18	6.0	10	0	0
1969	SD	14	14	64	1,003	15.7	71.6	76	4	**5**	25	5.0	16	0	0
1970	SD	14	13	35	608	17.4	43.4	80	4	0	0	—	0	0	0
1971	DAL	12	11	34	487	14.3	40.6	26	2	2	–10	–5.0	–4	0	0
1972	DAL	14	7	15	195	13.0	13.9	30	2	1	2	2.0	2	0	0
Career		137	127	542	10,266	18.9	74.9	85	85	24	129	5.4	35	2	5

=== Postseason ===
Year	Team	Games		Receiving						Fum
Year	Team	GP	GS	Rec	Yds	Y/R	Y/G	Lng	TD	Fum
1963	SD	1	1	4	77	19.3	77.0	**48**	**1**	0
1965	SD	1	1	4	**82**	**20.5**	**82.0**	25	0	0
1971	DAL	3	3	**5**	78	15.6	26.0	30	**1**	0
1972	DAL	2	2	3	55	18.3	27.5	28	**1**	0
Career		7	7	16	292	18.3	41.7	48	3	0

== Legacy ==
Alworth finished his 11 AFL/NFL seasons with 543 receptions for 10,266 yards. He also rushed for 129 yards, returned 29 punts for 309 yards, gained 216 yards on 10 kickoff returns, and scored 87 touchdowns (85 receiving and 2 rushing).

In 1972, he was inducted to the San Diego Hall of Champions. In 1977, he was inducted in the Chargers Hall of Fame. In 1978, he became the first San Diego Charger and the first player who had played in the AFL to be inducted into the Pro Football Hall of Fame. He chose to be presented at the Canton, Ohio ceremony by Oakland Raiders owner Al Davis, his former position coach at San Diego, who had much to do with the success of the AFL.

Alworth's number 19 was retired by the Chargers in 2005. In 1970, he was selected as a member of the AFL All-Time Team, and in 1994, he was named to the NFL 75th Anniversary All-Time Team, the only player to be named to both teams.

In 1979, he was inducted into the Arkansas Sports Hall of Fame. In 1988, he was inducted into the Mississippi Sports Hall of Fame.

In 1999, he was ranked number 31 on The Sporting News' list of the 100 Greatest Football Players, making him the highest-ranking Charger and the highest-ranking player to have spent more than one season in the AFL.

In 2014, he was inducted into the Southwest Conference Hall of Fame.

=== NFL records ===
- Most games with 200+ receiving yards: 5 (tied with Calvin Johnson)
- Fastest to 5,000 career receiving yards (52 games, tied with Justin Jefferson)
- Fastest to 6,000 career receiving yards (62 games)
- Fastest to 7,000 career receiving yards (72 games, tied with Julio Jones)
- Fastest to 8,000 career receiving yards (83 games)
- Most receiving yards in first 50 games: 4,785
- Most receiving yards in first 75 games: 7,532
- Most touchdown receptions, 70+ yards, career: 12
- Most consecutive seasons, 11+ TD receptions: 4 (1963–1966; tied with Marvin Harrison, 1999–2002; Art Powell, 1963–1966)
- Most consecutive seasons, 12+ TD receptions: 3, (1964–1966; tied with Jerry Rice, 1989–1991 and 1993–1995; Marvin Harrison, 1999–2001 and 2004–2006; Terrell Owens, 2000–2002; Cris Carter, 1997–1999)
- Most consecutive seasons, 13+ TD receptions: 3, (1964–1966; tied with Jerry Rice, 1989–1991 and 1993–1995; Terrell Owens, 2000–2002)

=== Chargers franchise records ===
- Receiving yards, season: 1,602 (1965)
- Receiving touchdowns, season: 14 (1965; tied with Tony Martin)
- Yards per reception, season: 23.2 (1965)
- Yards per reception, career (min. 50 receptions): 19.4
- Yards per game, season: 114.4 (1965)
- Yards per game, career: 86.3
- Seasons with 1000+ receiving yards: 7 (1963–1969)
- Consecutive seasons with 1000+ receiving yards: 7 (1963–1969)
- Seasons with 10+ receiving TDs: 5
- Consecutive games with a reception: 96 (September 7, 1962 – December 14, 1969)
- Games with 100+ receiving yards, career: 41
- Games with 100+ receiving yards, season: 9
- Games with 200+ receiving yards: 5 (only 3 other such games in franchise history)
- Games with 100+ receiving yards, and 1+ TDs: 36

== Personal life ==
Alworth and his third wife, Laura, whom he married in 1997, live in San Diego. He has six children.

In the early 1980s, Alworth founded All-Aboard Mini Storage, with self-storage facilities throughout California. He sold the company to Extra Space Storage in 2013 for $196 million.

Alworth's first wife, the former Betty Jeanne Allen, later married Arkansas Governor Jim Guy Tucker. Alworth's grandson, Brian Driscoll, was an offensive lineman at University of California, Berkeley from 2019-2023.

== See also ==
- List of NCAA major college yearly punt and kickoff return leaders
- List of American Football League players

Preceded by Len Dawson & Cookie Gilchrist	American Football League MVP; 1963 with Clem Daniels; Tobin Rote	Succeeded by Gino Cappelletti
