= Art Strozier =

American football player (1946–2018)

No. 89
- Position: Tight end

Personal information
- Born: May 23, 1946; Kansas City, Missouri
- Died: January 14, 2018 (aged 71); Kansas City, Missouri
- Listed height: 6 ft 2 in (1.88 m)
- Listed weight: 220 lb (100 kg)

Career information
- High school: Manual (MO)
- College: Kansas State
- NFL draft: 1968: undrafted

Career history
- San Diego Chargers (1968)*; San Diego Chargers (1970–1971)
- * Offseason or practice squad member only
- Stats at Pro Football Reference

Art Strozier (May 23, 1946 – January 14, 2018) was an American football tight end. He played for the San Diego Chargers from 1970 to 1971.

He died on January 14, 2018, in Kansas City, Missouri at age 71.
