= Larry Rentz =

American football player (born 1947)

No. 48
- Position: Defensive back

Personal information
- Born: August 1, 1947 (age 79); Miami, Florida, U.S.
- Listed height: 6 ft 1 in (1.85 m)
- Listed weight: 170 lb (77 kg)

Career information
- High school: Coral Gables Senior (Coral Gables, Florida)
- College: Florida (1965–1968)
- NFL draft: 1969: 17th round, 434th overall pick

Career history
- San Diego Chargers (1969)
- Stats at Pro Football Reference

Ralph Lawrence Rentz (born August 1, 1947) is an American former professional football player who was a defensive back for one season with the San Diego Chargers of the American Football League (AFL). He was selected by the Chargers in the 17th round of the 1969 NFL/AFL draft. He played college football for the Florida Gators as a quarterback.

== Early life and college ==
Ralph Lawrence Rentz was born on August 1, 1947, in Miami, Florida. He attended Coral Gables Senior High School in Coral Gables, Florida.

Rentz was a member of the Florida Gators from 1965 to 1968 as a quarterback. He was a three-year letterman from 1966 to 1968. He completed 80 of 140 (57.1%) for 1,031 yards, three touchdowns, and nine interceptions while also rushing for 194 yards and three touchdowns and catching eight passes for 107 yards. As a senior in 1968, Rentz, totaled 55 completions on 105 passing attempts (52.4%) for 533 yards and three interceptions, 41 rushing yards, one rushing touchdown, and six receptions for 53 yards.

== Professional career ==
Rentz was selected by the San Diego Chargers in the 17th round, with the 434th overall pick, of the 1969 NFL draft. He played in two games for the Chargers as a defensive back during the 1969 season. He was released in 1970.
