= Ron Sayers =

American football player (born 1947)

No. 31
- Position: Running back

Personal information
- Born: August 29, 1947 (age 79); Wichita, Kansas, U.S.
- Listed height: 6 ft 1 in (1.85 m)
- Listed weight: 209 lb (95 kg)

Career information
- High school: Omaha North (Omaha, Nebraska)
- College: Nebraska-Omaha (1965-1968)
- NFL draft: 1969: 2nd round, 44th overall pick

Career history
- San Diego Chargers (1969)

Career AFL statistics
- Rushing yards: 53
- Rushing average: 3.8
- Stats at Pro Football Reference

Ronald Sayers (born August 29, 1947) is an American former professional football player who was a running back for the San Diego Chargers of the American Football League (AFL) in 1969. He played college football for the Omaha Mavericks. He is the younger brother of Pro Football Hall of Fame running back Gale Sayers.
