= Willie Frazier =

American football player (1942–2013)

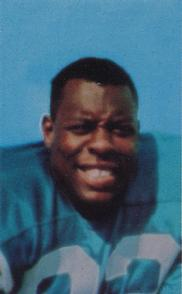
- Frazier c. 1969

No. 83, 87
- Position: Tight end

Personal information
- Born: June 19, 1942; El Dorado, Arkansas
- Died: September 5, 2013 (aged 71); Houston, Texas

Career information
- College: Arkansas AM&N
- NFL draft: 1964: undrafted

Career history
- Houston Oilers (1964–1965); San Diego Chargers (1966–1970); Houston Oilers (1971); Kansas City Chiefs (1971–1972); San Antonio Wings (1975); Houston Oilers (1975)

Awards and highlights
- 3× AFL All-Star (1965, 1967, 1969); All-Pro: 1965

Career NFL statistics
- Receptions: 209
- Receiving yards: 3088
- Touchdowns: 36
- Stats at Pro Football Reference

Willie C. Frazier (June 19, 1942 – September 5, 2013) was an American collegiate and professional American football tight end. He spent three stints with the Houston Oilers over a 10-year career in the AFL and NFL and was one of the 4,000-plus plaintiffs in the concussions-related lawsuit against the NFL that was tentatively settled for $765 million a week before his death.

At 6'4", 225 lbs. from Arkansas AM&N (now University of Arkansas at Pine Bluff), Frazier played 10 seasons from 1964 to 1975, all in the American Football League or the American Football Conference of the National Football League.

Frazier also played tight end for the San Diego Chargers and the Kansas City Chiefs between 1964 and 1972 and in 1975.

Born in Eldorado, Ark., Frazier played at Arkansas-Pine Bluff and joined the AFL's Oilers in 1964. He also played for the Chargers from 1966 through 1970, split the 1971 season between the Chiefs and Oilers and played for Kansas City in 1972 before a final season with Houston in 1975.

He played in 121 games with 209 catches for 3,088 yards, scoring 38 touchdowns, and was selected for the AFL All-Star Game in 1965, 1967 and 1969, winning all-AFL honors with the Oilers in 1965.

== See also ==
- List of American Football League players
