= Brad Hubbert =

American football player (born 1940)

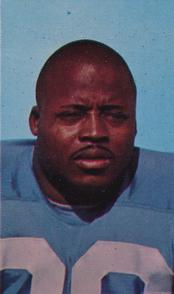
- Hubbert c. 1969

No. 26
- Position: Running back

Personal information
- Born: June 5, 1941 (age 85); Boligee, Alabama, U.S.
- Listed height: 6 ft 1 in (1.85 m)
- Listed weight: 235 lb (107 kg)

Career information
- High school: Greene County Training School (AL)
- College: Arizona
- AFL draft: 1966: Red Shirt 8th round, 71 (by the San Diego Chargers)th overall pick

Career history
- San Diego Chargers (1967–1970)

Awards and highlights
- AFL All-Star: 1967
- Stats at Pro Football Reference

Bradley Hubbert (born June 5, 1941) is an American former professional football player who was a running back for the San Diego Chargers of the American Football League (AFL) and National Football League (NFL). He played college football for the Arizona Wildcats.

== See also ==
- List of American Football League players
