= Al Denson (American football) =

American football player (born 1942)

No. 88, 86
- Positions: Wide receiver, Tight end

Personal information
- Born: January 2, 1942 (age 84); Jacksonville, Florida, U.S.
- Listed height: 6 ft 2 in (1.88 m)
- Listed weight: 208 lb (94 kg)

Career information
- College: Florida A&M
- NFL draft: 1964: 6th round, 72nd overall pick
- AFL draft: 1964: 6th round, 47th overall pick

Career history
- Denver Broncos (1964–1970); Minnesota Vikings (1971)

Awards and highlights
- 2× AFL All-Star (1967, 1969); AFL receiving touchdowns co-leader (1967)

Career NFL/AFL statistics
- Receptions: 260
- Receiving yards: 4,275
- Receiving touchdowns: 32
- Stats at Pro Football Reference

Alfred Freddie Denson (born January 2, 1942) is an American former professional football player who was a wide receiver for eight seasons with for the Denver Broncos of the American Football League (AFL), and the National Football League's (NFL) Broncos and Minnesota Vikings.

== College career ==
Denson played college football for the Florida A&M Rattlers and graduated in 1963. He was selected by the Broncos in the sixth round of the 1964 AFL draft and by the Philadelphia Eagles in the sixth round of the 1964 NFL draft, but chose to sign with Denver.

== Professional career ==
Denison made limited starts in his first two seasons with the Denver Broncos, combining for 485 yards in nine games over those seasons with one touchdown. In 1966, he showed promise with 36 catches for 725 yards with three touchdowns in his first full year. The following year, he led the league in touchdowns with 11 on 46 receptions for 899 yards. The following year, he made just seven starts while catching 34 passes for 586 yards and five touchdowns. He improved in 1969, catching 53 passes for 809 yards for 10 touchdowns.

In 1970, his last with the Broncos, he started each game and caught 47 passes for 646 yards with two touchdowns. After the season, he moved to Minnesota. He made appearances in seven games but caught just ten passes in that span for no touchdowns. At the age of 29, he retired from the league.

== NFL/AFL career statistics ==
Legend
	Led the league
**Bold**	Career high

Year	Team	Games		Receiving				
Year	Team	GP	GS	Rec	Yds	Avg	Lng	TD
1964	DEN	14	5	25	383	15.3	**82**	1
1965	DEN	14	4	9	102	11.3	20	0
1966	DEN	14	14	36	725	**20.1**	65	3
1967	DEN	14	14	46	**899**	19.5	68	**11**
1968	DEN	8	7	34	586	17.2	44	5
1969	DEN	13	13	**53**	809	15.3	62	10
1970	DEN	14	14	47	646	13.7	42	2
1971	MIN	7	3	10	125	12.5	17	0
		98	74	260	4,275	16.4	82	32

== See also ==
- List of American Football League players
