= Gene Foster =

American football player (born 1942)

No. 37, 16
- Position: Fullback

Personal information
- Born: March 20, 1942 (age 84); Pennsville Township, New Jersey, U.S.
- Listed height: 6 ft 0 in (1.83 m)
- Listed weight: 220 lb (100 kg)

Career information
- High school: Pennsville Memorial (Pennsville Township)
- College: Arizona State (1961–1964)
- NFL draft: 1965: 15th round, 201st overall pick
- AFL draft: 1965: 10th round, 78th overall pick

Career history
- San Diego Chargers (1965–1970); Atlanta Falcons (1971)*; Edmonton Eskimos (1971–1973); Ottawa Roughriders (1974)
- * Offseason or practice squad member only

Career NFL/AFL statistics
- Rushing yards: 1,613
- Rushing average: 3.6
- Receptions: 99
- Receiving yards: 904
- Total touchdowns: 7
- Stats at Pro Football Reference

Irving Eugene Foster (March 20, 1942) is an American former professional football player who was a running back in the American Football League (AFL) for the San Diego Chargers. He also was a member of the Edmonton Eskimos and Ottawa Rough Riders in the Canadian Football League (CFL). He played college football for the Arizona State Sun Devils.

== Early life ==
Born in Salem, New Jersey, Foster grew up in Pennsville Township, New Jersey and attended Pennsville Memorial High School. He accepted a football scholarship from Arizona State University, where he played halfback along with wingback Larry Todd.

As a senior, he led the team with 311 rushing yards. He finished his college career with 741 rushing yards, 7 rushing touchdowns, 323 receiving yards and one receiving touchdown. He played in the North-South Shrine Game.

== Professional career ==
Foster was selected by the San Diego Chargers in the 10th round (78th pick overall) of the 1965 AFL draft. He was also selected by the Dallas Cowboys in the 15th round (201st overall) of the 1965 NFL draft. As a rookie, he was a reserve fullback behind Keith Lincoln.

In 1966, he was named the starting fullback over Lincoln. In 1970, he appeared in 7 games (2 starts). He was waived on September 2, 1971.

On September 2, 1971, he was claimed off waivers by the Atlanta Falcons. He was released on September 13.

On September 20, 1971, he joined the Edmonton Eskimos of the Canadian Football League on a five-day tryout. In 1973, he missed most of the season after contracting pneumonia, which opened the door for Calvin Harrell to start at running back.

On June 4, 1974, he was traded to the Ottawa Rough Riders in exchange for defensive back Willie McKelton. On August 9, he was placed on the 12-day injury reserve list. He was released on September 10.
