= Pete Barnes =

American football player (1945–2018)

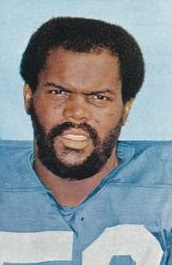
- Barnes c. 1971

No. 58, 59
- Position: Linebacker

Personal information
- Born: August 31, 1945; Keachi, Louisiana, U.S.
- Died: May 3, 2018 (aged 72); Tucson, Arizona, U.S.
- Listed height: 6 ft 1 in (1.85 m)
- Listed weight: 239 lb (108 kg)

Career information
- High school: Mary C. Womack (TX)
- College: Southern
- NFL draft: 1967: 6th round, 136th overall pick

Career history
- Houston Oilers (1967-1968); San Diego Chargers (1969-1972); St. Louis Cardinals (1973–1975); New England Patriots (1976–1977)

Career NFL/AFL statistics
- Interceptions: 15
- Fumble recoveries: 6
- Touchdowns: 1
- Sacks: 15
- Stats at Pro Football Reference

Peter G. Barnes (August 31, 1945 – May 3, 2018) was an American professional football linebacker who played professionally in the American Football League (AFL) and the National Football League (NFL). He played college football at Southern University. He played professionally in the AFL for the Houston Oilers in 1967 and 1968, and the San Diego Chargers in 1969. He then played in the NFL for the Chargers (1970–72), the St. Louis Cardinals (1973–75), and the New England Patriots (1976–77).

He was the father of Arizona women's basketball coach Adia Barnes.

Barnes died May 3, 2018, in hospice care in Tucson after suffering from Alzheimer's disease. He was 72 years old.

== See also ==
- List of American Football League players
