= Jeff Queen =

American football player (born 1946)

No. 47, 46
- Positions: Running back, Tight end

Personal information
- Born: August 15, 1946 (age 80); Boston, Massachusetts, U.S.
- Listed height: 6 ft 1 in (1.85 m)
- Listed weight: 217 lb (98 kg)

Career information
- High school: Roosevelt (Washington, D.C.)
- College: Morgan State
- NFL draft: 1968: 12th round, 317th overall pick

Career history
- San Diego Chargers (1969–1971); Oakland Raiders (1972–1973); Houston Oilers (1974)

Awards and highlights
- First-team Little All-American (1967)

Career NFL/AFL statistics
- Rushing yards: 596
- Rushing average: 3.3
- Receptions: 54
- Receiving yards: 658
- Total touchdowns: 10
- Stats at Pro Football Reference

Jeffrey Richard Queen (born August 15, 1946) is an American former professional football player who was a running back and tight end for six seasons in the National Football League (NFL) with the San Diego Chargers, Oakland Raiders, and Houston Oilers. He played college football for the Morgan State Bears.

Queen developed into a top-flight running back in 1970, his first year at that position. He led the Chargers in rushing and also caught 20 passes for 236 yards. Queen played tight end in 1969 after coming to San Diego as a linebacker. He also excelled on specialty teams.
