= Cal Withrow =

American football player (1945–2011)

Profile
- Position: Center

Personal information
- Born: July 4, 1945; Portsmouth, Ohio
- Died: July 3, 2011 (aged 65)

Career information
- College: Kentucky
- NFL draft: 1969: undrafted

Career history
- San Diego Chargers (1969-1970); Green Bay Packers (1971–1973); St. Louis Cardinals (1974)

Career NFL statistics
- Games played: 58
- Fumbles recovered: 1
- Stats at Pro Football Reference

James Calvin Withrow (July 4, 1945 – July 3, 2011) is a former center in the National Football League who played for the San Diego Chargers, Green Bay Packers and the St. Louis Cardinals. Withrow played collegiate ball for the University of Kentucky before playing professionally in the NFL for 5 seasons and retired in 1974. Cal died one day before his 66th birthday.
