= Russ Smith (running back) =

American football player (1944–2001)

Profile
- Position: Running back

Personal information
- Born: August 4, 1944; Bronxville, New York, U.S.
- Died: April 1, 2001 (aged 56)

Career information
- College: Miami (FL)
- AFL draft: 1966: 5th round, 40th overall pick

Career history
- San Diego Chargers (1967–1970)

Career statistics
- Rushing attempts-yards: 213-915
- Receptions-yards: 23-265
- Touchdowns: 10
- Stats at Pro Football Reference

Russell Conway Smith (August 4, 1944 – April 1, 2001) was an American professional football player who was a running back for four seasons for the San Diego Chargers. He had played high school football and basketball for Stranahan High School in Fort Lauderdale, Florida, and college football at the University of Miami.
