= Rick Eber =

American football player (born 1945)

No. 25, 49, 14, 15
- Position: Wide receiver

Personal information
- Born: April 17, 1945 (age 81); Torrance, California, U.S.
- Listed height: 6 ft 0 in (1.83 m)
- Listed weight: 185 lb (84 kg)

Career information
- High school: Redondo Union (Redondo Beach, California)
- College: Tulsa (1966-1967)
- NFL draft: 1968: 6th round, 162nd overall pick

Career history
- Atlanta Falcons (1968); San Diego Chargers (1969-1970); Saskatchewan Roughriders (1973); Houston Texans-Shreveport Steamer (1974-1975)

Career NFL/AFL statistics
- Receptions: 11
- Receiving yards: 184
- Receiving touchdowns: 1
- Stats at Pro Football Reference

Richard Lee Eber (born April 17, 1945) is an American former professional football player who was a wide receiver for the Atlanta Falcons and San Diego Chargers of the National Football League (NFL). He also played for (CFL) Saskatchewan Roughriders and (WFL) Houston Texans-Shreveport Steamer. He played college football for the Tulsa Golden Hurricane.
