= Gene Ferguson =

American football player (born 1947)

Eugene Bransford Ferguson (born June 5, 1947) is an American former professional football player in the National Football League (NFL). Ferguson played offensive tackle for the San Diego Chargers and Houston Oilers. He replaced Pro Football Hall of Fame tackle Ron Mix while with the Chargers.

He was one of the first NFL players to weigh 300 pounds. In 1970, he was listed as the only 300-pounder. That number has exploded to 358 as of 2013.
