= Charlie Waller (American football) =

American football coach (1921–2009)

Personal information
- Born: November 26, 1921; Griffin, Georgia, U.S.
- Died: September 5, 2009 (aged 87); Baker, Florida, U.S.

Career information
- College: Oglethorpe

Career history
- Decatur (GA) HS (1947-1950); Auburn (1951–1954) Offensive coordinator; Texas (1955–1956) Offensive coordinator; Clemson (1957–1965) Offensive coordinator; San Diego Chargers (1966–1971) Offensive coordinator; Washington Redskins (1972–1974) Wide receivers coach; Washington Redskins (1975–1977) Offensive coordinator; Los Angeles Rams (1978–1980) Offensive coordinator; Chicago Blitz (1983); Oakland Invaders (1984); Memphis Showboats (1985)

Head coaching record
- Regular season: 9–7–3 (.553)
- Postseason: 0–0 (–)
- Career: 9–7–3 (.553)
- Coaching profile at Pro Football Reference

Charlie F. Waller (November 26, 1921 – September 5, 2009) was an American Professional Football head coach for the San Diego Chargers from 1969, the last season of the American Football League, to 1970, the first season of the merged National Football League. His total coaching record at the end of his career was 9 wins, 7 losses and 3 ties. Waller was offensive backfield coach and took over for Chargers head coach Sid Gillman on November 14, 1969, after Gillman's resignation due to poor health, Gilman remained as general manager. After Gillman's health improved he was named Charger head coach on December 30, 1970, and Waller offensive coach. He is a 1942 graduate of Oglethorpe University and a 1980 inductee in its Athletic Hall of Fame. He was head football coach at Decatur, Georgia High School from 1947 to 1950, finishing with a 43-3-1 record. In just four years, he won four region titles and took home the 1949 and 1950 state championships, with both of those teams finishing undefeated. In 1951, he joined Ralph Jordan's staff as offensive backfield coach at Auburn University.

Waller was later an assistant coach for George Allen and the Washington Redskins.
