= 1972 San Diego Chargers season =

1972 NFL team season

- Owner: Eugene V. Klein
- General manager: Harland Svare
- Head coach: Harland Svare
- Home stadium: San Diego Stadium

Results
- Record: 4–9–1
- Division place: 4th AFC West
- Playoffs: Did not qualify
- All-Pros: None
- Pro Bowlers: 4: WR Gary Garrison; QB John Hadl; DE Deacon Jones; G Walt Sweeney

The 1972 San Diego Chargers season was the franchise's third season in the National Football League (NFL), and its 13th overall. The team failed to improve on their 6–8 record in 1971. The Chargers would get off to a poor start, as they were devoured 34–3 in their season opener at San Francisco. After their week 2 win against the Denver Broncos, the Chargers would play to a 17–17 draw with another cross-state rival, the Oakland Raiders. It was San Diego's fourth tie in 3 seasons (they tied 3 times in 1970). Even after they defeated the Baltimore Colts in the week following the tie, the Bolts would stumble the rest of the year, winning only 2 more games en route to a 4–9–1 season.

This squad featured several players like Duane Thomas, Tim Rossovich, Dave Costa and John Mackey who were unwanted by most of the other NFL teams.

== Offseason ==
=== NFL draft ===
1972 San Diego Chargers draft
Round	Pick	Player	Position	College	Notes
2	36	Pete Lazetich	Defensive end	Stanford	
3	61	Bill McClard	Kicker	Arkansas	
5	116	Jim Bishop	Tight end	Tennessee Tech	
5	130	Harry Gooden	Defensive end	Alcorn State	
6	141	Bruce Ward	Guard	San Diego State	
9	221	Fran Schmitz	Defensive tackle	St. Norbert	
10	246	Lon Kolstad	Linebacker	Wisconsin–Whitewater	
11	270	John Turner	Tight end	Long Beach State	
12	295	Sam Key	Linebacker	Elon	
13	321	Andy Selfridge	Linebacker	Virginia	
14	351	John Van Reenen	Defensive end	Washington State	
15	376	Charles Neugent	Defensive back	Tuskegee	
16	401	James Shaw	Defensive back	Tulsa	
17	423	Oscar Dragon	Running back	Arizona State University	
17	426	Bob Tackett	Tackle	Texas at El Paso	
Made roster * Made at least one Pro Bowl during career

== Roster ==
1972 San Diego Chargers roster
Quarterbacks (QB): 13 Wayne Clark; 21 John Hadl; Running backs (RB): 34 Oscar Dragon; 35 Cid Edwards; 20 Mike Garrett; 46 John Sykes; 42 Jesse Taylor; 38 Lee White; Wide receivers (WR): 83 Mike Carter; 28 Chuck Dicus; 27 Gary Garrison; 84 Dave Williams; Tight ends (TE): 81 John Andrews; 89 John Mackey; 88 Pettis Norman	Offensive linemen (OL): 69 Ira Gordon T; 65 Sam Gruneisen C; 55 Carl Mauck C; 76 Terry Owens T; 78 Walt Sweeney G; 70 Russ Washington T; 54 Ralph Wenzel G; 63 Doug Wilkerson G; 79 Ernie Wright T; Defensive linemen (DL): 87 Lionel Aldridge DE; 64 Dave Costa DT; 77 Ron East DT; 80 Kevin Hardy DT; 75 Deacon Jones DE; 57 Cal Snowden DE; 73 Lee Thomas DE; 68 Greg Wojcik DT	Linebackers (LB): 60 Bob Babich OLB; 59 Pete Barnes OLB; 50 Lee Roy Caffey OLB; 51 Pete Lazetich MLB; 66 Rick Redman OLB; 82 Tim Rossovich MLB; 56 Ray White OLB; Defensive backs (DB): 40 Joe Beauchamp FS/CB; 45 Reggie Berry SS; 35 Chuck Detwiler FS; 39 Lenny Dunlap CB; 23 Ray Jones CB; 30 Bryant Salter SS; Special teams (ST): 10 Bill McClard K; 29 Dennis Partee P	Reserve: 44 Chris Fletcher S (IR); 24 Bob Howard CB (IR); 58 Harris Jones G (IR); 25 Jerry LeVias WR (IR); -- Clancy Oliver CB (IR); 53 Mel Rogers LB (IR); 33 Duane Thomas RB (Susp.); Rookies in italics

== Preseason ==
Week	Date	Opponent	Result	Record	Venue	Attendance
1	August 5	Atlanta Falcons	W 30–7	1–0	San Diego Stadium	
2	August 12	at Minnesota Vikings	L 13–24	1–1	Metropolitan Stadium	
3	August 19	San Francisco 49ers	W 17–16	2–1	San Diego Stadium	
4	August 26	at New Orleans Saints	W 16–14	3–1	Tulane Stadium	
5	September 2	Los Angeles Rams	W 14–13	4–1	San Diego Stadium	
6	September 6	New York Jets	T 20–20	4–1–1	San Diego Stadium	

== Regular season ==
=== Schedule ===
Week	Date	Opponent	Result	Record	Venue	Attendance	Recap
1	September 17	at San Francisco 49ers	**L** 3–34	0–1	Candlestick Park	59,438	Recap
2	September 24	**Denver Broncos**	**W** 37–14	1–1	San Diego Stadium	49,048	Recap
3	October 1	at **Oakland Raiders**	**T** 17–17	1–1–1	Oakland–Alameda County Coliseum	53,455	Recap
4	October 8	at Baltimore Colts	**W** 23–20	2–1–1	Memorial Stadium	55,459	Recap
5	October 15	at Miami Dolphins	**L** 10–24	2–2–1	Miami Orange Bowl	80,010	Recap
6	October 22	at Detroit Lions	**L** 20–34	2–3–1	Tiger Stadium	54,371	Recap
7	October 29	**Kansas City Chiefs**	**L** 14–26	2–4–1	San Diego Stadium	54,533	Recap
8	November 5	Dallas Cowboys	**L** 28–34	2–5–1	San Diego Stadium	54,476	Recap
9	November 13	Cleveland Browns	**L** 17–21	2–6–1	San Diego Stadium	54,205	Recap
10	November 19	at **Kansas City Chiefs**	**W** 27–17	3–6–1	Arrowhead Stadium	79,011	Recap
11	November 26	Houston Oilers	**W** 34–20	4–6–1	San Diego Stadium	46,289	Recap
12	December 3	**Oakland Raiders**	**L** 19–21	4–7–1	San Diego Stadium	54,611	Recap
13	December 10	at **Denver Broncos**	**L** 13–38	4–8–1	Mile High Stadium	51,478	Recap
14	December 17	Pittsburgh Steelers	**L** 2–24	4–9–1	San Diego Stadium	52,873	Recap
Note: Intra-division opponents are in **bold** text.

=== Game summaries ===
==== Week 1: at San Francisco 49ers ====
Week 1: San Diego Chargers at San Francisco 49ers – Game summary

Quarter	1	2	3	4	Total
Chargers	3	0	0	0	**3**
**49ers**	7	17	7	3	**34**

at Candlestick Park, San Francisco, California

- Date: September 17
- Game time: 1:00 p.m. PDT
- Game weather: 59 °F (15.0 °C), relative humidity 74%, wind 10 mph
- Game attendance: 59,438
- Referee: Bernie Ulman
- Box score

Game information

**First quarter**

- SF – Gene Washington 13-yard pass from John Brodie (Bruce Gossett kick), 8:28. 49ers 7–0. **Drive: 2 plays, 14 yards.**
- SDG – Dennis Partee 30-yard field goal, 2:06. 49ers 7–3. **Drive: 12 plays, 58 yards, 6:22.**

**Second quarter**

- SF – Bruce Gossett 43-yard field goal, 12:10. 49ers 10–3. **Drive: 13 plays, 39 yards, 4:56.**
- SF – Gene Washington 23-yard pass from John Brodie (Bruce Gossett kick), 3:23. 49ers 17–3. **Drive: 8 plays, 80 yards, 4:13.**
- SF – Gene Washington 45-yard pass from John Brodie (Bruce Gossett kick), 0:42. 49ers 24–3. **Drive: 4 plays, 61 yards, 0:38.**

**Third quarter**

- SF – Jimmy Thomas 4-yard run (Bruce Gossett kick), 7:36. 49ers 31–3. **Drive: 1 play, 8 yards, 0:07.**

**Fourth quarter**

- SF – Bruce Gossett 20-yard field goal, 10:28. 49ers 34–3. **Drive: 6 plays, 16 yards, 2:12.**

**Top passers**

- SDG – John Hadl – 11/25, 109 yards, 2 INT
- SF – John Brodie – 11/19, 156 yards, 3 TD, INT

**Top rushers**

- SDG – Mike Garrett – 19 rushes, 80 yards
- SF – Jimmy Thomas – 13 rushes, 64 yards, TD

**Top receivers**

- SDG – Dave Williams – 3 receptions, 83 yards
- SF – Gene Washington – 8 receptions, 140 yards, 3 TD

==== Week 2: vs. Denver Broncos ====
Week 2: Denver Broncos at San Diego Chargers – Game summary

Quarter	1	2	3	4	Total
Broncos	7	0	0	7	**14**
**Chargers**	13	21	0	3	**37**

at San Diego Stadium, San Diego, California

- Date: September 24
- Game time: 1:00 p.m. PDT
- Game weather: 68 °F (20.0 °C), relative humidity 74%, wind 13 mph
- Game attendance: 49,048
- Referee: Jim Tunney
- Box score

Game information

**First quarter**

- DEN – Randy Montgomery 94-yard kickoff return (Jim Turner kick), 14:45. Broncos 7–0.
- SDG – Dennis Partee 45-yard field goal, 9:29. Broncos 7–3. **Drive: 12 plays, 40 yards, 5:16.**
- SDG – Dennis Partee 11-yard field goal, 6:24. Broncos 7–6. **Drive: 4 plays, -2 yards, 1:22.**
- SDG – Mike Garrett 41-yard run (Dennis Partee kick), 4:42. Chargers 13–7. **Drive: 3 plays, 57 yards, 0:28.**

**Second quarter**

- SDG – Gary Garrison 9-yard pass from John Hadl (Dennis Partee kick), 9:21. Chargers 20–7. **Drive: 7 plays, 41 yards, 4:21.**
- SDG – Dave Williams 31-yard pass from John Hadl (Dennis Partee kick), 3:05. Chargers 27–7. **Drive: 4 plays, 49 yards, 1:47.**
- SDG – Joe Beauchamp 47-yard interception return (Dennis Partee kick), 2:07. Chargers 34–7.

**Third quarter**

- No scoring plays.

**Fourth quarter**

- DEN – Steve Ramsey 8-yard run (Jim Turner kick), 4:47. Chargers 34–14. **Drive: 12 plays, 80 yards, 4:14.**
- SDG – Bill McClard 47-yard field goal, 0:55. Chargers 37–14. **Drive: 8 plays, 40 yards, 3:52.**

**Top passers**

- DEN – Steve Ramsey – 14/25, 192 yards, 3 INT
- SDG – John Hadl – 15/32, 188 yards, 2 TD, INT

**Top rushers**

- DEN – Fran Lynch – 5 rushes, 43 yards
- SDG – Mike Garrett – 21 rushes, 104 yards, TD

**Top receivers**

- DEN – Rod Sherman – 6 receptions, 95 yards
- SDG – Gary Garrison – 6 receptions, 69 yards, TD

==== Week 3: at Oakland Raiders ====
Week 3: San Diego Chargers at Oakland Raiders – Game summary

Quarter	1	2	3	4	Total
Chargers	0	7	0	10	**17**
Raiders	14	0	0	3	**17**

at Oakland-Alameda County Coliseum, Oakland, California

- Date: October 1
- Game time: 1:00 p.m. PDT
- Game weather: 61 °F (16.1 °C), relative humidity 83%, wind 10 mph
- Game attendance: 53,455
- Referee: Dick Jorgensen
- Box score

Game information

**First quarter**

- OAK – Raymond Chester 23-yard pass from Daryle Lamonica (George Blanda kick), 7:26. Raiders 7–0. **Drive: 7 plays, 54 yards, 3:16.**
- OAK – Marv Hubbard 1-yard run (George Blanda kick), 3:20. Raiders 14–0. **Drive: 7 plays, 45 yards, 3:10.**

**Second quarter**

- SDG – Cid Edwards 1-yard run (Dennis Partee kick), 2:10. Raiders 14–7. **Drive: 12 plays, 55 yards, 6:54.**

**Third quarter**

- No scoring plays.

**Fourth quarter**

- SDG – Carl Mauck offensive fumble recovery in end zone (Dennis Partee kick), 14:12. Tied 14–14. **Drive: 11 plays, 79 yards, 5:18.**
- SDG – Dennis Partee 41-yard field goal, 7:02. Chargers 17–14. **Drive: 10 plays, 31 yards, 5:43.**
- OAK – George Blanda 40-yard field goal, 4:28. Tied 17–17. **Drive: 7 plays, 35 yards, 2:34.**

**Top passers**

- SDG – John Hadl – 9/13, 156 yards, INT
- OAK – Daryle Lamonica – 14/26, 152 yards, TD, INT

**Top rushers**

- SDG – Cid Edwards – 18 rushes, 97 yards, TD
- OAK – Marv Hubbard – 16 rushes, 58 yards, TD

**Top receivers**

- SDG – Cid Edwards – 6 receptions, 100 yards
- OAK – Fred Biletnikoff – 5 receptions, 75 yards

==== Week 4: at Baltimore Colts ====
Week 4: San Diego Chargers at Baltimore Colts – Game summary

Quarter	1	2	3	4	Total
**Chargers**	0	7	0	10	**17**
Colts	14	0	0	3	**17**

at Memorial Stadium, Baltimore, Maryland

- Date: October 8
- Game time: 2:00 p.m. PDT
- Game weather: 60 °F (15.6 °C), relative humidity 52%, wind 15 mph
- Game attendance: 55,459
- Referee: Fred Wyant
- Box score

Game information

**First quarter**

- SDG – Mike Garrett 1-yard run (Dennis Partee kick), 7:40. Chargers 7–0. **Drive: 12 plays, 75 yards, 7:20.**

**Second quarter**

- BAL – Jim O'Brien 22-yard field goal, 7:28. Chargers 7–3. **Drive: 10 plays, 45 yards, 3:55.**
- SDG – Dennis Partee 51-yard field goal, 2:55. Chargers 10–3. **Drive: 9 plays, 28 yards, 4:33.**

**Third quarter**

- BAL – Don Nottingham 13-yard run (Jim O'Brien kick), 10:19. Tied 10–10. **Drive: 11 plays, 84 yards, 4:41.**
- BAL – Jim O'Brien 20-yard field goal, 6:06. Colts 17–10. **Drive: 6 plays, 12 yards, 2:08.**
- BAL – Don Nottingham 3-yard run (Jim O'Brien kick), 0:11. Colts 20–10. **Drive: 9 plays, 57 yards, 3:39.**

**Fourth quarter**

- SDG – Mike Garrett 2-yard run (Dennis Partee kick), 10:05. Colts 20–17. **Drive: 4 plays, 24 yards, 1:52.**
- SDG – Dennis Partee 40-yard field goal, 2:14. Tied 20–20. **Drive: 7 plays, 12 yards, 1:46.**
- SDG – Dennis Partee 28-yard field goal, 0:04. Chargers 23–20. **Drive: 5 plays, 30 yards, 1:04.**

**Top passers**

- SDG – John Hadl – 12/20, 148 yards, 3 INT
- BAL – Johnny Unitas – 14/22, 130 yards

**Top rushers**

- SDG – Mike Garrett – 27 rushes, 132 yards, 2 TD
- BAL – Don Nottingham – 17 rushes, 85 yards, 2 TD

**Top receivers**

- SDG – Gary Garrison – 4 receptions, 59 yards
- BAL – Cotton Speyrer – 3 receptions, 34 yards

==== Week 5: at Miami Dolphins ====
Week 5: San Diego Chargers at Miami Dolphins – Game summary

Quarter	1	2	3	4	Total
Chargers	3	0	0	7	**10**
**Dolphins**	3	14	7	0	**24**

at Orange Bowl, Miami, Florida

- Date: October 15
- Game time: 1:00 p.m. EDT
- Game weather: 78 °F (25.6 °C), relative humidity 72%, wind 10 mph
- Game attendance: 80,010
- Referee: Chuck Heberling
- Box score

Game information

**First quarter**

- MIA – Garo Yepremian 37-yard field goal, 5:18. Dolphins 3–0. **Drive: 6 plays, 20 yards, 2:00.**
- SDG – Dennis Partee 12-yard field goal, 0:56. Tied 3–3. **Drive: 12 plays, 76 yards, 4:22.**

**Second quarter**

- MIA – Dick Anderson 35-yard fumble return (Garo Yepremian kick), 13:51. Dolphins 10–3.
- MIA – Howard Twilley 18-yard pass from Earl Morrall (Garo Yepremian kick), 4:25. Dolphins 17–3. **Drive: 4 plays, 34 yards, 2:10.**

**Third quarter**

- MIA – Paul Warfield 19-yard pass from Earl Morrall (Garo Yepremian kick), 9:25. Dolphins 24–3. **Drive: 8 plays, 46 yards, 5:35.**

**Fourth quarter**

- SDG – Cid Edwards 3-yard pass from John Hadl (Bill McClard kick), 4:56. Dolphins 24–10. **Drive: 6 plays, 19 yards, 2:58.**

**Top passers**

- SDG – John Hadl – 12/22, 117 yards, TD, 2 INT
- MIA – Earl Morrall – 8/10, 86 yards, 2 TD

**Top rushers**

- SDG – Mike Garrett – 22 rushes, 68 yards
- MIA – Larry Csonka – 13 rushes, 70 yards

**Top receivers**

- SDG – Cid Edwards – 4 receptions, 39 yards, TD
- MIA – Howard Twilley – 2 receptions, 41 yards, TD

==== Week 6: at Detroit Lions ====
Week 6: San Diego Chargers at Detroit Lions – Game summary

Quarter	1	2	3	4	Total
Chargers	6	0	0	14	**20**
**Lions**	6	7	14	7	**34**

at Tiger Stadium, Detroit, Michigan

- Date: October 22
- Game time: 1:00 p.m. EDT
- Game weather: 47 °F (8.3 °C), relative humidity 96%, wind 9 mph
- Game attendance: 54,371
- Box score

Game information

**First quarter**

- DET – Errol Mann 25-yard field goal, 8:49. Lions 3–0. **Drive: 11 plays, 49 yards, 4:17.**
- SDG – Cid Edwards 1-yard run (kick blocked), 1:55. Chargers 6–3. **Drive: 11 plays, 73 yards, 6:54.**
- DET – Errol Mann 41-yard field goal, 0:47. Tied 6–6. **Drive: 4 plays, 0 yards, 1:08.**

**Second quarter**

- DET – Mel Farr 1-yard run (Errol Mann kick), 6:54. Lions 13–6. **Drive: 15 plays, 65 yards, 7:53.**

**Third quarter**

- DET – Mel Farr 2-yard run (Errol Mann kick), 7:55. Lions 20–6. **Drive: 12 plays, 60 yards, 7:05.**
- DET – Larry Walton 24-yard pass from Greg Landry (Errol Mann kick), 4:21. Lions 27–6. **Drive: 5 plays, 17 yards, 2:04.**

**Fourth quarter**

- DET – Greg Landry 5-yard run (Errol Mann kick), 12:03. Lions 34–6. **Drive: 9 plays, 61 yards, 5:16.**
- SDG – Gary Garrison 15-yard pass from John Hadl (Dennis Partee kick), 10:08. Lions 34–13. **Drive: 4 plays, 67 yards, 1:55.**
- SDG – Gary Garrison 5-yard pass from John Hadl (Dennis Partee kick), 6:40. Lions 34–20. **Drive: 5 plays, 17 yards, 0:56.**

**Top passers**

- SDG – John Hadl – 12/27, 161 yards, 2 TD, 2 INT
- DET – Greg Landry – 12/24, 151 yards, TD, INT

**Top rushers**

- SDG – Cid Edwards – 9 rushes, 42 yards, TD
- DET – Mel Farr – 22 rushes, 96 yards, 2 TD

**Top receivers**

- SDG – Gary Garrison – 7 receptions, 119 yards, 2 TD
- DET – Larry Walton – 7 receptions, 101 yards, TD

==== Week 7: vs. Kansas City Chiefs ====
Week 7: Kansas City Chiefs at San Diego Chargers – Game summary

Quarter	1	2	3	4	Total
**Chiefs**	0	3	10	13	**26**
Chargers	0	7	0	7	**14**

at San Diego Stadium, San Diego, California

- Date: October 29
- Game time: 1:00 p.m. PST
- Game weather: 62 °F (16.7 °C), relative humidity 75%, wind 8 mph
- Game attendance: 54,533
- Referee: Norm Schachter
- Box score

Game information

**First quarter**

- No scoring plays.

**Second quarter**

- KAN – Jan Stenerud 33-yard field goal, 8:52. Chiefs 3–0. **Drive: 16 plays, 54 yards, 9:05.**
- SDG – Mike Garrett 27-yard pass from John Hadl (Dennis Partee kick), 3:41. Chargers 7–3. **Drive: 10 plays, 81 yards, 5:11.**

**Third quarter**

- KAN – Jan Stenerud 50-yard field goal, 12:37. Chargers 7–6. **Drive: 7 plays, 25 yards, 2:23.**
- KAN – Ed Podolak 6-yard run (Jan Stenerud kick), 0:40. Chiefs 13–7. **Drive: 5 plays, 17 yards, 3:18.**

**Fourth quarter**

- KAN – Jan Stenerud 15-yard field goal, 9:20. Chiefs 16–7. **Drive: 4 plays, 4 yards, 1:46.**
- SDG – Mike Garrett 3-yard run (Dennis Partee kick), 3:17. Chiefs 16–14. **Drive: 11 plays, 78 yards, 6:03.**
- KAN – Robert West 8-yard offensive fumble return (Jan Stenerud kick), 1:49. Chiefs 23–14. **Drive: 3 plays, 65 yards, 1:28.**
- KAN – Jan Stenerud 37-yard field goal, 0:31. Chiefs 26–14. **Drive: 4 plays, -5 yards, 0:40.**

**Top passers**

- KAN – Len Dawson – 14/27, 154 yards, 2 INT
- SDG – John Hadl – 18/36, 231 yards, TD, 3 INT

**Top rushers**

- KAN – Ed Podolak – 18 rushes, 71 yards, TD
- SDG – Cid Edwards – 12 rushes, 55 yards

**Top receivers**

- KAN – Otis Taylor – 5 receptions, 86 yards
- SDG – Cid Edwards – 7 receptions, 93 yards

==== Week 8: vs. Dallas Cowboys ====
Week 8: Dallas Cowboys at San Diego Chargers – Game summary

Quarter	1	2	3	4	Total
**Cowboys**	10	14	7	3	**34**
Chargers	0	0	7	21	**28**

at San Diego Stadium, San Diego, California

- Date: November 5
- Game time: 1:00 p.m. PST
- Game weather: 64 °F (17.8 °C), relative humidity 75%, wind 9 mph
- Game attendance: 54,476
- Referee: Bernie Ulman
- Box score

Game information

**First quarter**

- DAL – Mike Montgomery 54-yard fumble return (Toni Fritsch kick), 13:16. Cowboys 7–0.
- DAL – Toni Fritsch 25-yard field goal, 7:32. Cowboys 10–0. **Drive: 6 plays, 18 yards, 2:39.**

**Second quarter**

- DAL – Walt Garrison 9-yard run (Toni Fritsch kick), 10:25. Cowboys 17–0. **Drive: 4 plays, 40 yards, 2:22.**
- DAL – Mike Ditka 1-yard pass from Craig Morton (Toni Fritsch kick), 0:43. Cowboys 24–0. **Drive: 8 plays, 52 yards, 3:26.**

**Third quarter**

- DAL – Craig Morton 7-yard run (Toni Fritsch kick), 6:31. Cowboys 31–0. **Drive: 9 plays, 70 yards, 3:47.**
- SDG – Chuck Dicus 46-yard pass from John Hadl (Dennis Partee kick), 3:56. Cowboys 31–7. **Drive: 6 plays, 80 yards, 2:35.**

**Fourth quarter**

- SDG – Gary Garrison 42-yard pass from John Hadl (Dennis Partee kick), 13:39. Cowboys 31–14. **Drive: 5 plays, 68 yards, 2:26.**
- SDG – Chuck Dicus 20-yard pass from John Hadl (Dennis Partee kick), 10:09. Cowboys 31–21. **Drive: 5 plays, 32 yards, 1:36.**
- DAL – Toni Fritsch 31-yard field goal, 3:47. Cowboys 34–21. **Drive: 11 plays, 81 yards, 6:22.**
- SDG – Dave Williams 47-yard pass from John Hadl (Dennis Partee kick), 0:00. Cowboys 34–28. **Drive: 4 plays, 60 yards.**

**Top passers**

- DAL – Craig Morton – 15/21, 161 yards, TD, INT
- SDG – John Hadl – 11/26, 211 yards, 4 TD, 3 INT

**Top rushers**

- DAL – Walt Garrison – 13 rushes, 44 yards, TD
- SDG – Mike Garrett – 17 rushes, 88 yards

**Top receivers**

- DAL – Ron Sellers – 3 receptions, 79 yards
- SDG – Chuck Dicus – 4 receptions, 77 yards, 2 TD

==== Week 9: vs. Cleveland Browns ====
Week 9: Cleveland Browns at San Diego Chargers – Game summary

Quarter	1	2	3	4	Total
**Browns**	0	7	0	14	**21**
Chargers	0	3	7	7	**17**

at San Diego Stadium, San Diego, California

- Date: November 13
- Game time: 6:00 p.m. PST
- Game weather: 58 °F (14.4 °C), relative humidity 65%, wind 6 mph
- Game attendance: 54,205
- Box score

Game information

**First quarter**

- No scoring plays.

**Second quarter**

- SDG – Dennis Partee 26-yard field goal. Chargers 3–0.
- CLE – Mike Phipps 1-yard run (Don Cockroft kick). Browns 7–3.

**Third quarter**

- SDG – Cid Edwards 4-yard pass from John Hadl (Dennis Partee kick). Chargers 10–7.

**Fourth quarter**

- CLE – Ken Brown 2-yard run (Don Cockroft kick). Browns 14–10.
- SDG – Mike Garrett 3-yard run (Dennis Partee kick). Chargers 17–14.
- CLE – Frank Pitts 38-yard pass from Mike Phipps (Don Cockroft kick). Browns 21–17.

**Top passers**

- CLE – Mike Phipps – 13/21, 186 yards, TD, INT
- SDG – John Hadl – 12/21, 140 yards, TD, INT

**Top rushers**

- CLE – Leroy Kelly – 17 rushes, 67 yards
- SDG – Cid Edwards – 17 rushes, 91 yards

**Top receivers**

- CLE – Frank Pitts – 5 receptions, 96 yards, TD
- SDG – Pettis Norman – 3 receptions, 47 yards

==== Week 10: at Kansas City Chiefs ====
Week 10: San Diego Chargers at Kansas City Chiefs – Game summary

Quarter	1	2	3	4	Total
**Chargers**	7	17	3	0	**27**
Chiefs	7	0	3	7	**17**

at Arrowhead Stadium, Kansas City, Missouri

- Date: November 19
- Game time: 1:00 p.m. CST
- Game weather: 32 °F (0.0 °C), relative humidity 81%, wind 11 mph, wind chill 23
- Game attendance: 79,011
- Referee: Jack Reader
- Box score

Game information

**First quarter**

- SDG – Mike Garrett 3-yard run (Dennis Partee kick), 5:54. Chargers 7–0. **Drive: 3 plays, 63 yards, 1:38.**
- KAN – Wendell Hayes 4-yard pass from Len Dawson (Jan Stenerud kick), 1:08. Tied 7–7. **Drive: 7 plays, 44 yards, 4:46.**

**Second quarter**

- SDG – Dennis Partee 46-yard field goal, 10:37. Chargers 10–7. **Drive: 6 plays, 16 yards, 3:08.**
- SDG – John Hadl 1-yard run (Dennis Partee kick), 6:31. Chargers 17–7. **Drive: 9 plays, 47 yards, 4:06.**
- SDG – Gary Garrison 20-yard pass from John Hadl (Dennis Partee kick), 0:22. Chargers 24–7. **Drive: 7 plays, 59 yards, 1:26.**

**Third quarter**

- SDG – Dennis Partee 24-yard field goal, 11:17. Chargers 27–7. **Drive: 4 plays, 4 yards, 1:14.**
- KAN – Jan Stenerud 28-yard field goal, 1:47. Chargers 27–10. **Drive: 10 plays, 60 yards, 4:37.**

**Fourth quarter**

- KAN – Robert West 36-yard pass from Mike Livingston (Jan Stenerud kick), 4:11. Chargers 27–17. **Drive: 11 plays, 37 yards, 4:14.**

**Top passers**

- SDG – John Hadl – 17/28, 216 yards, TD
- KAN – Mike Livingston – 19/30, 231 yards, TD, 3 INT

**Top rushers**

- SDG – Cid Edwards – 12 rushes, 62 yards
- KAN – Ed Podolak – 18 rushes, 71 yards, TD

**Top receivers**

- SDG – Cid Edwards – 6 receptions, 82 yards
- KAN – Mike Adamle – 9 receptions, 34 yards

==== Week 11: vs. Houston Oilers ====
Week 11: Houston Oilers at San Diego Chargers – Game summary

Quarter	1	2	3	4	Total
Oilers	0	3	0	17	**20**
**Chargers**	10	10	7	7	**34**

at San Diego Stadium, San Diego, California

- Date: November 26
- Game time: 1:00 p.m. PST
- Game weather: 61 °F (16.1 °C), relative humidity 51%, wind 7 mph
- Game attendance: 46,289
- Box score

Game information

**First quarter**

- SDG – Jesse Taylor blocked punt recovery in end zone (Dennis Partee kick). Chargers 7–0.
- SDG – Dennis Partee 31-yard field goal. Chargers 10–0.

**Second quarter**

- HOU – Skip Butler 49-yard field goal. Chargers 10–3.
- SDG – Dennis Partee 11-yard field goal. Chargers 13–3.
- SDG – Cid Edwards 1-yard run (Dennis Partee kick). Chargers 20–3.

**Third quarter**

- SDG – Cid Edwards 31-yard run (Dennis Partee kick). Chargers 27–3.

**Fourth quarter**

- HOU – Skip Butler 47-yard field goal. Chargers 27–6.
- SDG – Dave Williams 3-yard pass from John Hadl (Dennis Partee kick). Chargers 34–6.
- HOU – Rhett Dawson 3-yard pass from Dan Pastorini (Skip Butler kick). Chargers 34–13.
- HOU – Fred Willis 7-yard pass from Kent Nix (Skip Butler kick). Chargers 34–20.

**Top passers**

- HOU – Dan Pastorini – 17/35, 166 yards, TD, INT
- SDG – John Hadl – 13/24, 141 yards, TD

**Top rushers**

- HOU – Paul Robinson – 17 rushes, 67 yards
- SDG – Mike Garrett – 17 rushes, 102 yards

**Top receivers**

- HOU – Ken Burrough – 4 receptions, 52 yards
- SDG – Cid Edwards – 3 receptions, 44 yards

==== Week 12: vs. Oakland Raiders ====
Week 12: Oakland Raiders at San Diego Chargers – Game summary

Quarter	1	2	3	4	Total
**Raiders**	7	7	0	7	**21**
Chargers	0	10	6	3	**19**

at San Diego Stadium, San Diego, California

- Date: December 3
- Game time: 1:00 p.m. PST
- Game weather: 60 °F (15.6 °C), relative humidity 71%, wind 9 mph
- Game attendance: 54,611
- Referee: Ed Marion
- Box score

Game information

**First quarter**

- OAK – Raymond Chester 16-yard pass from Daryle Lamonica (George Blanda kick), 5:01. Raiders 7–0. **Drive: 10 plays, 58 yards, 5:39.**

**Second quarter**

- SDG – Dennis Partee 15-yard field goal, 14:14. Raiders 7–3. **Drive: 12 plays, 66 yards, 5:47.**
- SDG – Cid Edwards 1-yard run (Dennis Partee kick), 5:00. Chargers 10–7. **Drive: 12 plays, 58 yards, 6:28.**
- OAK – Fred Biletnikoff 36-yard pass from Daryle Lamonica (George Blanda kick), 1:49. Raiders 14–10. **Drive: 7 plays, 65 yards, 3:11.**

**Third quarter**

- SDG – Gary Garrison 52-yard pass from John Hadl (kick blocked), 6:09. Chargers 16–14. **Drive: 1 play, 52 yards, 0:08.**

**Fourth quarter**

- SDG – Dennis Partee 18-yard field goal, 12:31. Chargers 19–14. **Drive: 8 plays, 59 yards, 2:43.**
- OAK – Charlie Smith 9-yard run (George Blanda kick), 1:18. Raiders 21–19. **Drive: 7 plays, 80 yards, 2:13.**

**Top passers**

- OAK – Daryle Lamonica – 14/23, 223 yards, 2 TD, 2 INT
- SDG – John Hadl – 15/26, 221 yards, TD, 2 INT

**Top rushers**

- OAK – Marv Hubbard – 15 rushes, 68 yards
- SDG – Mike Garrett – 28 rushes, 145 yards

**Top receivers**

- OAK – Mike Siani – 4 receptions, 71 yards
- SDG – Gary Garrison – 4 receptions, 79 yards, TD

==== Week 13: at Denver Broncos ====
Week 13: San Diego Chargers at Denver Broncos – Game summary

Quarter	1	2	3	4	Total
Chargers	0	3	3	7	**13**
**Broncos**	7	14	17	0	**38**

at Mile High Stadium, Denver, Colorado

- Date: December 10
- Game time: 12:00 p.m. MST
- Game weather: 7 °F (−13.9 °C), relative humidity 52%, wind 7 mph, wind chill -20
- Game attendance: 51,478
- Box score

Game information

**First quarter**

- DEN – Floyd Little 2-yard run (Jim Turner kick). Broncos 7–0.

**Second quarter**

- SDG – Bill McClard 26-yard field goal. Broncos 7–3.
- DEN – Joe Dawkins 4-yard run (Jim Turner kick). Broncos 14–3.
- DEN – Charlie Greer 65-yard punt return (Jim Turner kick). Broncos 21–3.

**Third quarter**

- SDG – Bill McClard 48-yard field goal, 9:29. Broncos 21–6.
- DEN – Jim Turner 12-yard field goal, 4:47. Broncos 24–6.
- DEN – Haven Moses 11-yard pass from Charley Johnson (Jim Turner kick), 4:47. Broncos 31–6.
- DEN – Haven Moses 7-yard pass from Charley Johnson (Jim Turner kick), 4:47. Broncos 38–6.

**Fourth quarter**

- SDG – Gary Garrison 23-yard pass from John Hadl (Dennis Partee kick), 9:21. Broncos 38–13.

**Top passers**

- SDG – John Hadl – 22/44, 288 yards, TD, 2 INT
- DEN – Charley Johnson – 6/10, 85 yards, 2 TD, INT

**Top rushers**

- SDG – Mike Garrett – 15 rushes, 59 yards
- DEN – Jim Krieg – 1 rush, 63 yards

**Top receivers**

- SDG – Gary Garrison – 10 receptions, 156 yards, TD
- DEN – Haven Moses – 3 receptions, 43 yards, 2 TD

==== Week 14: vs. Pittsburgh Steelers ====
Week 14: Pittsburgh Steelers at San Diego Chargers – Game summary

Quarter	1	2	3	4	Total
**Steelers**	7	7	3	7	**24**
Chargers	2	0	0	0	**2**

at San Diego Stadium, San Diego, California

- Date: December 17
- Game time: 1:00 p.m. PST
- Game weather: 60 °F (15.6 °C), relative humidity 37%, wind 6 mph
- Game attendance: 52,873
- Referee: Pat Haggerty
- Box score

Game information

**First quarter**

- PIT – Franco Harris 2-yard run (Roy Gerela kick), 11:51. Steelers 7–0. **Drive: 3 plays, 11 yards, 1:19.**
- SDG – Safety, Dave Costa sacked Terry Bradshaw in end zone, 6:42. Steelers 7–2.

**Second quarter**

- PIT – John Fuqua 2-yard run (Roy Gerela kick), 6:05. Steelers 14–2. **Drive: 4 plays, 34 yards, 1:29.**

**Third quarter**

- PIT – Roy Gerela 26-yard field goal, 1:57. Steelers 17–2. **Drive: 6 plays, 13 yards, 1:26.**

**Fourth quarter**

- PIT – Ron Shanklin 17-yard pass from Terry Bradshaw (Roy Gerela kick), 6:03. Steelers 24–2. **Drive: 6 plays, 48 yards, 4:01.**

**Top passers**

- PIT – Terry Bradshaw – 12/23, 152 yards, TD, INT
- SDG – John Hadl – 11/26, 122 yards, 4 INT

**Top rushers**

- PIT – John Fuqua – 17 rushes, 51 yards, TD
- SDG – Cid Edwards – 13 rushes, 52 yards

**Top receivers**

- PIT – John Fuqua – 3 receptions, 50 yards
- SDG – Cid Edwards – 3 receptions, 42 yards

=== Standings ===
AFC West
	W	L	T	PCT	DIV	CONF	PF	PA	STK
Oakland Raiders	10	3	1	.750	3–2–1	7–3–1	365	248	W6
Kansas City Chiefs	8	6	0	.571	4–2	6–5	287	254	W3
Denver Broncos	5	9	0	.357	2–4	4–6	325	350	W2
San Diego Chargers	4	9	1	.321	2–3–1	4–6–1	264	344	L3

== Notable events ==
In their last game for the year, the Chargers became the thirty-third team in the NFL or leagues that merged with the NFL to score only a safety in a full game. This unusual occurrence has been repeated only six times since: by the 1980 Buffalo Bills, the 1983 Minnesota Vikings, the 1993 Cincinnati Bengals, the 2011 Atlanta Falcons (the only team to do so in a playoff game), the 2013 Jacksonville Jaguars, and the 2024 Houston Texans.

== Awards ==
Deacon Jones, John Hadl, Walt Sweeney and Gary Garrison were named to the AFC Pro Bowl squad; No Chargers were named All-Pro by the Associated Press, nor were any named the best in his Conference.
