= 1971 San Diego Chargers season =

NFL team season

- Owner: Eugene V. Klein
- General manager: Harland Svare
- Head coach: Sid Gillman (games 1-10); Harland Svare (games 11-14)
- Home stadium: San Diego Stadium

Results
- Record: 6–8
- Division place: 3rd AFC West
- Playoffs: Did not qualify
- All-Pros: None
- Pro Bowlers: 2: WR Gary Garrison; G Walt Sweeney

The 1971 San Diego Chargers season was the franchise's second season in the National Football League (NFL), and its 12th overall. The team improved on their 5–6–3 record in 1970. It was Harland Svare's first season as the team's head coach. After a 1–4 start, the Chargers would slightly improve, winning 3 of their next 4 games. However, they would lose 3 of their final 5 games en route to a 6–8 finish. Their record was 6-1 at home and 0-7 on the road. The only bright spot was quarterback John Hadl who completed 233 passes out of 431 attempts for 3,075 yards and 21 touchdowns and won the NFL Man of the Year award as well as leading the league in both passing yards and touchdown passes.

== Offseason ==
=== NFL draft ===
1971 San Diego Chargers draft
Round	Pick	Player	Position	College	Notes
1	13	Leon Burns	Running back	Long Beach State	
3	65	Mike Montgomery	Running back	Kansas State	
5	115	Bryant Salter	Safety	Pittsburgh	
5	117	Ray White	Linebacker	Syracuse	
5	119	Phil Asack	Defensive end	Duke	
6	143	Jacob Mayes	Running back	Tennessee State	
7	169	Chuck Dicus	Wide receiver	Arkansas	
8	195	Leon Van Gorkum	Defensive end	San Diego State	
9	221	John Tanner	Linebacker	Tennessee Tech	
10	247	Gary Nowak	Linebacker	Michigan State	
11	273	Don Pinson	Defensive back	Tennessee State	
12	299	Wes Garnett	Wide receiver	Utah State	
13	325	Sammy Milner	Wide receiver	Mississippi State	
14	351	Edward O'Daniel	Defensive end	Texas Southern	
15	377	Eric Humston	Linebacker	Muskingum	
16	403	Ed Foote	Center	Hawaii	
17	429	Chip Kell	Center	Tennessee	
Made roster * Made at least one Pro Bowl during career

== Roster ==
1971 San Diego Chargers roster
Quarterbacks (QB): 13 Wayne Clark; 14 Marty Domres; 21 John Hadl; Running backs (RB): 38 Leon Burns; 20 Mike Garrett; 23 Mike Montgomery; 47 Jeff Queen; 36 Eddie Ray; Wide receivers (WR): 28 Chuck Dicus; 27 Gary Garrison; 84 Walker Gillette; 25 Jerry LeVias; 32 Billy Parks; Tight ends (TE): 88 Pettis Norman; 89 Art Strozier	Offensive linemen (OL): 69 Ira Gordon T; 58 Harris Jones G; 55 Carl Mauck C; 76 Terry Owens T; 57 Jack Porter C; 78 Walt Sweeney G; 70 Russ Washington T; 63 Doug Wilkerson G; Defensive linemen (DL): 82 Steve DeLong DE; 77 Ron East DT; 86 Wes Grant DE; 80 Kevin Hardy DT; 75 Gary Nowak DT; 79 Andy Rice DT; 85 John Tanner DE; 73 Lee Thomas DE; 87 Tom Williams DE	Linebackers (LB): 60 Bob Babich MLB; 59 Pete Barnes OLB; 56 Bob Bruggers OLB; 66 Rick Redman OLB; 53 Mel Rogers OLB; 81 Jeff Staggs OLB; 52 Ray White OLB; Defensive backs (DB): 40 Joe Beauchamp CB; 35 Chuck Detwiler SS; 44 Chris Fletcher FS; 39 Jim Hill FS; 24 Bob Howard CB; 30 Bryant Salter SS; 43 Jim Tolbert SS; Special teams (ST): 29 Dennis Partee K/P	Reserve: 64 Phil Asack DE (IR); 49 Rick Eber WR (IR); 65 Sam Gruneisen C (IR); Rookies in italics

== Preseason ==
Week	Date	Opponent	Result	Record	Venue	Attendance
1	August 7	Washington Redskins	W 19–10	1–0	San Diego Stadium	
2	August 14	Minnesota Vikings	L 7–34	1–1	San Diego Stadium	
3	August 22	at San Francisco 49ers	L 17–28	1–2	Candlestick Park	
4	August 28	New Orleans Saints	W 22–7	2–2	San Diego Stadium	
5	September 3	at Los Angeles Rams	W 20–14	3–2	Los Angeles Memorial Coliseum	
6	September 11	Atlanta Falcons	W 21–14	4–2	San Diego Stadium	

== Regular season ==
=== Schedule ===
Week	Date	Opponent	Result	Record	Venue	Attendance	Recap
1	September 19	**Kansas City Chiefs**	**W** 21–14	1–0	San Diego Stadium	54,061	Recap
2	September 26	**Oakland Raiders**	**L** 0–34	1–1	San Diego Stadium	54,084	Recap
3	October 3	at Pittsburgh Steelers	**L** 17–21	1–2	Three Rivers Stadium	44,339	Recap
4	October 10	at **Kansas City Chiefs**	**L** 10–31	1–3	Municipal Stadium	50,514	Recap
5	October 17	at **Denver Broncos**	**L** 16–20	1–4	Mile High Stadium	51,200	Recap
6	October 23	Buffalo Bills	**W** 20–3	2–4	San Diego Stadium	49,261	Recap
7	October 31	New York Jets	**W** 49–21	3–4	San Diego Stadium	44,786	Recap
8	November 7	at New York Giants	**L** 17–35	3–5	Yankee Stadium	62,905	Recap
9	November 15	St. Louis Cardinals	**W** 20–17	4–5	San Diego Stadium	46,486	Recap
10	November 21	at **Oakland Raiders**	**L** 33–34	4–6	Oakland–Alameda County Coliseum	54,681	Recap
11	November 28	at Cincinnati Bengals	**L** 0–31	4–7	Riverfront Stadium	59,580	Recap
12	December 5	Minnesota Vikings	**W** 30–14	5–7	San Diego Stadium	54,505	Recap
13	December 12	**Denver Broncos**	**W** 45–17	6–7	San Diego Stadium	44,347	Recap
14	December 19	at Houston Oilers	**L** 33–49	6–8	Houston Astrodome	35,959	Recap
Note: Intra-division opponents are in **bold** text.

=== Game summaries ===
==== Week 1: vs. Kansas City Chiefs ====
Week One: Kansas City Chiefs at San Diego Chargers – Game summary

Quarter	1	2	3	4	Total
Chiefs	7	7	0	0	**14**
**Chargers**	0	0	7	14	**21**

at San Diego Stadium, San Diego, California

- Date: September 19
- Game time: 1:00 p.m. PDT
- Game weather: 73 °F (22.8 °C), relative humidity 74%, wind 12 mph
- Game attendance: 54,061
- Referee: Ben Dreith
- Box score

Game information

**First quarter**

- KAN – Warren McVea 6-yard run (Jan Stenerud kick), 8:29. Chiefs 7–0. **Drive: 5 plays, 31 yards, 1:36.**

**Second quarter**

- KAN – Ed Podolak 1-yard run (Jan Stenerud kick), 14:10. Chiefs 14–0. **Drive: 10 plays, 80 yards, 5:12.**

**Third quarter**

- SDG – Mike Montgomery 39-yard pass from John Hadl (Dennis Partee kick), 4:04. Chiefs 14–7. **Drive: 5 plays, 81 yards, 2:56.**

**Fourth quarter**

- SDG – Jerry LeVias 37-yard pass from John Hadl (Dennis Partee kick), 9:34. Tied 14–14. **Drive: 5 plays, 67 yards, 1:01.**
- SDG – Mike Garrett 26-yard run (Dennis Partee kick), 5:20. Chargers 21–14. **Drive: 7 plays, 73 yards, 2:17.**

**Top passers**

- KAN – Len Dawson – 11/22, 152 yards, 2 INT
- SDG – John Hadl – 17/37, 260 yards, 2 TD, INT

**Top rushers**

- KAN – Ed Podolak – 17 rushes, 65 yards, TD
- SDG – Mike Garrett – 15 rushes, 59 yards, TD

**Top receivers**

- KAN – Otis Taylor – 3 receptions, 76 yards
- SDG – Gary Garrison – 4 receptions, 72 yards

==== Week 2: vs. Oakland Raiders ====
Week Two: Oakland Raiders at San Diego Chargers – Game summary

Quarter	1	2	3	4	Total
**Raiders**	3	3	14	14	**34**
Chargers	0	0	0	0	**0**

at San Diego Stadium, San Diego, California

- Date: September 26
- Game time: 1:00 p.m. PDT
- Game weather: 68 °F (20.0 °C), relative humidity 57%, wind 11 mph
- Game attendance: 54,084
- Referee: Jack Vest
- Box score

Game information

**First quarter**

- OAK – George Blanda 37-yard field goal, 4:26. Raiders 3–0. **Drive: 4 plays, 7 yards, 1:29.**

**Second quarter**

- OAK – George Blanda 42-yard field goal, 5:01. Raiders 6–0. **Drive: 7 plays, 27 yards, 2:37.**

**Third quarter**

- OAK – Fred Biletnikoff 36-yard pass from Daryle Lamonica (George Blanda kick), 7:55. Raiders 13–0. **Drive: 8 plays, 74 yards, 4:48.**
- OAK – Clarence Davis 2-yard run (George Blanda kick), 0:10. Raiders 20–0. **Drive: 7 plays, 57 yards, 3:44.**

**Fourth quarter**

- OAK – Fred Biletnikoff 13-yard pass from Daryle Lamonica (George Blanda kick), 4:27. Raiders 27–0. **Drive: 9 plays, 84 yards, 4:32.**
- OAK – Ken Stabler 1-yard run (George Blanda kick), 0:21. Raiders 34–0. **Drive: 5 plays, 52 yards, 2:10.**

**Top passers**

- OAK – Daryle Lamonica – 11/17, 162 yards, 2 TD
- SDG – John Hadl – 14/29, 174 yards, 5 INT

**Top rushers**

- OAK – Clarence Davis – 9 rushes, 75 yards, TD
- SDG – Jeff Queen – 9 rushes, 31 yards

**Top receivers**

- OAK – Fred Biletnikoff – 5 receptions, 93 yards, 2 TD
- SDG – Billy Parks – 5 receptions, 70 yards

==== Week 3: at Pittsburgh Steelers ====
Week Three: San Diego Chargers at Pittsburgh Steelers – Game summary

Quarter	1	2	3	4	Total
Chargers	3	7	7	0	**17**
**Steelers**	7	0	7	7	**21**

at Three Rivers Stadium, Pittsburgh, Pennsylvania

- Date: October 3
- Game time: 1:10 p.m. EDT
- Game weather: 68 °F (20.0 °C), relative humidity 82%, wind 7 mph
- Game attendance: 44,339
- Referee: Jim Tunney
- Box score

Game information

**First quarter**

- SDG – Dennis Partee 21-yard field goal, 6:26. Chargers 3–0. **Drive: 12 plays, 54 yards.**
- PIT – John Fuqua 5-yard run (Roy Gerela kick), 4:15. Steelers 7–3. **Drive: 1 play, 5 yards.**

**Second quarter**

- SDG – Billy Parks 16-yard pass from John Hadl (Dennis Partee kick), 4:19. Chargers 10–7. **Drive: 12 plays, 80 yards, 7:02.**

**Third quarter**

- PIT – John Fuqua 1-yard run (Roy Gerela kick), 8:47. Steelers 14–10. **Drive: 4 plays, 22 yards, 1:31.**
- SDG – Mike Garrett 4-yard run (Dennis Partee kick), 2:09. Chargers 17–14. **Drive: 11 plays, 80 yards, 6:38.**

**Fourth quarter**

- PIT – Terry Bradshaw 5-yard run (Roy Gerela kick), 12:02. Steelers 21–17. **Drive: 13 plays, 82 yards, 5:07.**

**Top passers**

- SDG – John Hadl – 25/36, 283 yards, TD, 2 INT
- PIT – Terry Bradshaw – 15/24, 175 yards

**Top rushers**

- SDG – Mike Garrett – 12 rushes, 72 yards, TD
- PIT – John Fuqua – 15 rushes, 60 yards, 2 TD

**Top receivers**

- SDG – Billy Parks – 8 receptions, 111 yards, TD
- PIT – John Fuqua – 5 receptions, 53 yards

==== Week 4: at Kansas City Chiefs ====
Week Four: San Diego Chargers at Kansas City Chiefs – Game summary

Quarter	1	2	3	4	Total
Chargers	3	7	0	0	**10**
**Chiefs**	0	10	7	14	**31**

at Municipal Stadium, Kansas City, Missouri

- Date: October 10
- Game time: 1:05 p.m. CDT
- Game weather: 53 °F (11.7 °C), relative humidity 53%, wind 10 mph
- Game attendance: 50,514
- Referee: Jack Reader
- Box score

Game information

**First quarter**

- SDG – Dennis Partee 43-yard field goal, 9:58. Chargers 3–0. **Drive: 6 plays, 29 yards.**

**Second quarter**

- SDG – Mike Garrett 3-yard pass from John Hadl (Dennis Partee kick), 14:15. Chargers 10–0. **Drive: 9 plays, 71 yards.**
- KAN – Jim Otis 3-yard pass from Len Dawson (Jan Stenerud kick), 6:24. Chargers 10–7. **Drive: 6 plays, 58 yards.**
- KAN – Jan Stenerud 29-yard field goal, 1:13. Tied 10–10. **Drive: 9 plays, 49 yards, 1:52.**

**Third quarter**

- KAN – Otis Taylor 3-yard pass from Len Dawson (Jan Stenerud kick), 4:23. Chargers 17–10. **Drive: 7 plays, 61 yards, 3:23.**

**Fourth quarter**

- KAN – Warren McVea 15-yard run (Jan Stenerud kick), 11:15. Chargers 24–10. **Drive: 7 plays, 60 yards, 3:24.**
- KAN – Ed Podolak 7-yard run (Jan Stenerud kick), 0:16. Chargers 31–10. **Drive: 13 plays, 70 yards, 8:28.**

**Top passers**

- SDG – John Hadl – 12/23, 125 yards, TD, 2 INT
- KAN – Len Dawson – 16/23, 188 yards, 2 TD

**Top rushers**

- SDG – Mike Garrett – 7 rushes, 44 yards
- KAN – Wendell Hayes – 11 rushes, 80 yards

**Top receivers**

- SDG – Billy Parks – 2 receptions, 36 yards
  SDG – Gary Garrison – 1 reception, 36 yards
- KAN – Otis Taylor – 6 receptions, 97 yards, TD

==== Week 5: at Denver Broncos ====
Week Five: San Diego Chargers at Denver Broncos – Game summary

Quarter	1	2	3	4	Total
Chargers	3	3	7	3	**16**
**Broncos**	7	13	0	0	**20**

at Mile High Stadium, Denver, Colorado

- Date: October 17
- Game time: 2:00 p.m. MDT
- Game weather: 50 °F (10.0 °C), relative humidity 90%, wind 9 mph
- Game attendance: 51,200
- Referee: Dick Jorgensen
- Box score

Game information

**First quarter**

- DEN – Bobby Anderson 1-yard run (Jim Turner kick), 11:58. Broncos 7–0. **Drive: 2 plays, 3 yards.**
- SDG – Dennis Partee 41-yard field goal, 9:15. Broncos 7–3. **Drive: 6 plays, 39 yards, 2:43.**

**Second quarter**

- DEN – Jim Turner 49-yard field goal, 14:55. Broncos 10–3. **Drive: 9 plays, 38 yards, 5:07.**
- SDG – Dennis Partee 20-yard field goal, 11:20. Broncos 10–6. **Drive: 10 plays, 36 yards, 3:35.**
- DEN – Floyd Little 2-yard run (Jim Turner kick), 3:54. Broncos 17–6. **Drive: 12 plays, 83 yards, 7:26.**
- DEN – Jim Turner 10-yard field goal, 0:18. Broncos 20–6. **Drive: 7 plays, 18 yards, 0:39.**

**Third quarter**

- SDG – Gary Garrison 21-yard pass from John Hadl (Dennis Partee kick), 0:53. Broncos 20–13. **Drive: 4 plays, 77 yards.**

**Fourth quarter**

- SDG – Dennis Partee 35-yard field goal, 13:48. Broncos 20–16. **Drive: 5 plays, -2 yards, 1:19.**

**Top passers**

- SDG – John Hadl – 18/44, 236 yards, TD, INT
- DEN – Don Horn – 7/17, 71 yards, INT

**Top rushers**

- SDG – Billy Parks – 1 rush, 54 yards
- DEN – Bobby Anderson – 25 rushes, 106 yards, TD

**Top receivers**

- SDG – Gary Garrison – 4 receptions, 105 yards, TD
- DEN – Bobby Anderson – 3 receptions, 43 yards

==== Week 6: vs. Buffalo Bills ====
Week Six: Buffalo Bills at San Diego Chargers – Game summary

Quarter	1	2	3	4	Total
Bills	0	0	3	0	**3**
**Chargers**	7	3	3	7	**20**

at San Diego Stadium, San Diego, California

- Date: October 23
- Game time: 6:00 p.m. PDT
- Game weather: 64 °F (17.8 °C), relative humidity 78%, wind 7 mph
- Game attendance: 49,261
- Referee: Bernie Ulman
- Box score

Game information

**First quarter**

- SDG – Billy Parks 56-yard pass from John Hadl (Dennis Partee kick), 9:51. Chargers 7–0. **Drive: 7 plays, 80 yards, 2:37.**

**Second quarter**

- SDG – Dennis Partee 9-yard field goal, 4:13. Chargers 10–0. **Drive: 15 plays, 70 yards, 7:28.**

**Third quarter**

- BUF – Grant Guthrie 36-yard field goal, 9:31. Chargers 10–3. **Drive: 4 plays, 5 yards, 1:27.**
- SDG – Dennis Partee 10-yard field goal, 6:31. Chargers 13–3. **Drive: 5 plays, 57 yards, 3:00.**

**Fourth quarter**

- SDG – Billy Parks 12-yard pass from John Hadl (Dennis Partee kick), 2:27. Chargers 20–3. **Drive: 5 plays, 56 yards, 3:14.**

**Top passers**

- BUF – James Harris – 4/8, 36 yards, INT
- SDG – John Hadl – 14/28, 215 yards, 2 TD, INT

**Top rushers**

- BUF – O. J. Simpson – 18 rushes, 106 yards
- SDG – Mike Garrett – 19 rushes, 94 yards

**Top receivers**

- BUF – Ike Hill – 2 receptions, 20 yards
- SDG – Gary Garrison – 4 receptions, 106 yards

==== Week 7: vs. New York Jets ====
Week Seven: New York Jets at San Diego Chargers – Game summary

Quarter	1	2	3	4	Total
Jets	7	7	7	0	**21**
**Chargers**	0	21	7	21	**49**

at San Diego Stadium, San Diego, California

- Date: October 31
- Game time: 1:00 p.m. PST
- Game weather: 57 °F (13.9 °C), relative humidity 54%, wind 10 mph
- Game attendance: 44,786
- Referee: Fred Wyant
- Box score

Game information

**First quarter**

- NYJ – Rich Caster 23-yard pass from Bob Davis (Bobby Howfield kick), 6:59. Jets 7–0. **Drive: 2 plays, 35 yards, 0:57.**

**Second quarter**

- SDG – John Hadl 2-yard run (Dennis Partee kick), 10:32. Tied 7–7. **Drive: 11 plays, 93 yards, 6:09.**
- NYJ – John Riggins 31-yard pass from Bob Davis (Bobby Howfield kick), 5:59. Jets 14–7. **Drive: 8 plays, 65 yards, 4:33.**
- SDG – Mike Montgomery 37-yard pass from John Hadl (Dennis Partee kick), 2:45. Tied 14–14. **Drive: 2 plays, 75 yards, 0:32.**
- SDG – Billy Parks 17-yard pass from John Hadl (Dennis Partee kick), 0:26. Chargers 21–14. **Drive: 4 plays, 34 yards, 0:24.**

**Third quarter**

- NYJ – Emerson Boozer 6-yard run (Ralph Baker pass from Bob Davis), 12:52. Tied 21–21. **Drive: 3 plays, 18 yards, 1:35.**
- SDG – Gary Garrison 49-yard pass from John Hadl (Dennis Partee kick), 9:44. Chargers 28–21. **Drive: 6 plays, 80 yards, 3:08.**

**Fourth quarter**

- SDG – Mike Montgomery 13-yard run (Dennis Partee kick), 10:57. Chargers 35–21. **Drive: 5 plays, 64 yards, 1:52.**
- SDG – Pettis Norman 21-yard pass from John Hadl (Dennis Partee kick), 9:10. Chargers 42–21. **Drive: 2 plays, 21 yards, 0:17.**
- SDG – Chris Fletcher 36-yard interception return (Dennis Partee kick), 3:30. Chargers 49–21.

**Top passers**

- NYJ – Bob Davis – 8/18, 83 yards, 2 TD, 2 INT
- SDG – John Hadl – 19/27, 358 yards, 4 TD, INT

**Top rushers**

- NYJ – John Riggins – 10 rushes, 63 yards
- SDG – Mike Garrett – 9 rushes, 55 yards

**Top receivers**

- NYJ – Rich Caster – 4 receptions, 53 yards, TD
- SDG – Gary Garrison – 6 receptions, 162 yards, TD

==== Week 8: at New York Giants ====
Week Eight: San Diego Chargers at New York Giants – Game summary

Quarter	1	2	3	4	Total
Chargers	0	3	14	0	**17**
**Giants**	7	14	0	14	**35**

at Yankee Stadium, New York, New York

- Date: November 7
- Game time: 1:07 p.m. EST
- Game weather: 53 °F (11.7 °C), relative humidity 69%, wind 19 mph
- Game attendance: 62,905
- Referee: Norm Schachter
- Box score

Game information

**First quarter**

- NYG – Ron Johnson 1-yard run (Pete Gogolak kick), 0:47. Giants 7–0. **Drive: 13 plays, 65 yards, 8:09.**

**Second quarter**

- NYG – Charlie Evans 9-yard run (Pete Gogolak kick), 9:54. Giants 14–0. **Drive: 6 plays, 63 yards, 3:44.**
- NYG – Rich Kotite 43-yard pass from Fran Tarkenton (Pete Gogolak kick), 1:10. Giants 21–0. **Drive: 4 plays, 75 yards, 1:34.**
- SDG – Dennis Partee 28-yard field goal, 0:02. Giants 21–3. **Drive: 5 plays, 60 yards, 1:08.**

**Third quarter**

- SDG – Gary Garrison 7-yard pass from John Hadl (Dennis Partee kick), 7:14. Giants 21–10. **Drive: 13 plays, 74 yards, 6:31.**
- SDG – Gary Garrison 21-yard pass from Mike Montgomery (Dennis Partee kick), 4:02. Giants 21–17. **Drive: 5 plays, 58 yards, 1:10.**

**Fourth quarter**

- NYG – Charlie Evans 1-yard run (Pete Gogolak kick), 14:58. Giants 28–17. **Drive: 8 plays, 84 yards, 4:04.**
- NYG – Charlie Evans 1-yard run (Pete Gogolak kick), 0:55. Giants 35–17. **Drive: 7 plays, 28 yards, 4:24.**

**Top passers**

- SDG – John Hadl – 16/31, 194 yards, TD, 2 INT
- NYG – Fran Tarkenton – 16/20, 83 yards, TD

**Top rushers**

- SDG – Mike Garrett – 6 rushes, 45 yards
- NYG – Ron Johnson – 12 rushes, 67 yards, TD

**Top receivers**

- SDG – Jeff Queen – 5 receptions, 85 yards
- NYG – Coleman Zeno – 4 receptions, 90 yards

==== Week 9: vs. St. Louis Cardinals ====
Week Nine: St. Louis Cardinals at San Diego Chargers – Game summary

Quarter	1	2	3	4	Total
Cardinals	7	3	0	7	**17**
**Chargers**	0	3	7	10	**20**

at San Diego Stadium, San Diego, California

- Date: November 15
- Game time: 6:00 p.m. PST
- Game weather: 57 °F (13.9 °C), relative humidity 66%, wind 9 mph
- Game attendance: 46,486
- Referee: John McDonough
- Box score

Game information

**First quarter**

- STL – Jim McFarland 3-yard pass from Jim Hart (Jim Bakken kick), 2:49. Cardinals 7–0. **Drive: 10 plays, 62 yards, 4:36.**

**Second quarter**

- SDG – Dennis Partee 25-yard field goal, 13:36. Cardinals 7–3. **Drive: 9 plays, 67 yards, 4:11.**
- STL – Jim Bakken 13-yard field goal, 0:30. Cardinals 10–3. **Drive: 14 plays, 72 yards, 4:28.**

**Third quarter**

- SDG – Jeff Queen 4-yard run (Dennis Partee kick), 5:32. Tied 10–10. **Drive: 10 plays, 72 yards, 4:52.**

**Fourth quarter**

- SDG – Jeff Queen 4-yard pass from John Hadl (Dennis Partee kick), 3:16. Chargers 17–10. **Drive: 9 plays, 68 yards, 5:36.**
- STL – Cid Edwards 1-yard run (Jim Bakken kick), 0:17. Tied 17–17. **Drive: 5 plays, 33 yards, 1:08.**
- SDG – Dennis Partee 45-yard field goal, 0:00. Chargers 20–17. **Drive: 3 plays, 16 yards, 0:16.**

**Top passers**

- STL – Jim Hart – 17/35, 214 yards, TD, 3 INT
- SDG – John Hadl – 20/28, 216 yards, TD, INT

**Top rushers**

- STL – MacArthur Lane – 18 rushes, 82 yards
- SDG – Mike Montgomery – 17 rushes, 98 yards

**Top receivers**

- STL – John Gilliam – 5 receptions, 76 yards
- SDG – Mike Montgomery – 6 receptions, 77 yards

==== Week 10: at Oakland Raiders ====
Week Ten: San Diego Chargers at Oakland Raiders – Game summary

Quarter	1	2	3	4	Total
Chargers	10	14	0	9	**33**
**Raiders**	3	7	14	10	**34**

at Oakland-Alameda County Coliseum, Oakland, California

- Date: November 21
- Game time: 1:00 p.m. PST
- Game weather: 50 °F (10.0 °C), relative humidity 65%, wind 7 mph
- Game attendance: 54,681
- Referee: Jim Tunney
- Box score

Game information

**First quarter**

- OAK – George Blanda 34-yard field goal, 7:42. Raiders 3–0. **Drive: 14 plays, 51 yards, 7:18.**
- SDG – Dennis Partee 14-yard field goal, 2:01. Tied 3–3. **Drive: 12 plays, 65 yards, 5:41.**
- SDG – Jeff Queen 2-yard run (Dennis Partee kick), 0:09. Chargers 10–3. **Drive: 4 plays, 14 yards, 1:39.**

**Second quarter**

- SDG – Mike Garrett 11-yard run (Dennis Partee kick), 5:43. Chargers 17–3. **Drive: 9 plays, 80 yards, 3:53.**
- OAK – Raymond Chester 16-yard pass from Daryle Lamonica (George Blanda kick), 4:48. Chargers 17–10. **Drive: 3 plays, 61 yards, 0:55.**
- SDG – Mike Garrett 18-yard pass from John Hadl (Dennis Partee kick), 1:10. Chargers 24–10. **Drive: 7 plays, 77 yards, 3:38.**

**Third quarter**

- OAK – Raymond Chester 13-yard pass from Daryle Lamonica (George Blanda kick), 11:37. Chargers 24–17. **Drive: 5 plays, 46 yards, 2:02.**
- OAK – Pete Banaszak 2-yard run (George Blanda kick), 2:10. Tied 24–24. **Drive: 9 plays, 68 yards, 4:52.**

**Fourth quarter**

- OAK – George Blanda 40-yard field goal, 11:05. Raiders 27–24. **Drive: 9 plays, 28 yards, 3:55.**
- OAK – Rod Sherman 32-yard pass from Daryle Lamonica (George Blanda kick), 6:49. Raiders 34–24. **Drive: 6 plays, 64 yards, 3:29.**
- SDG – Walker Gillette 15-yard pass from John Hadl (Dennis Partee kick), 3:08. Raiders 34–31. **Drive: 10 plays, 85 yards, 3:30.**
- SDG – Safety, Ray White tackled Jerry DePoyster in end zone, 0:00. Raiders 34–33.

**Top passers**

- SDG – John Hadl – 20/36, 321 yards, 2 TD, INT
- OAK – Daryle Lamonica – 16/26, 190 yards, 3 TD

**Top rushers**

- SDG – Mike Garrett – 13 rushes, 63 yards, TD
- OAK – Pete Banaszak – 10 rushes, 50 yards, TD

**Top receivers**

- SDG – Mike Garrett – 4 receptions, 81 yards, TD
- OAK – Fred Biletnikoff – 7 receptions, 80 yards

==== Week 11: at Cincinnati Bengals ====
Week Eleven: San Diego Chargers at Cincinnati Bengals – Game summary

Quarter	1	2	3	4	Total
Chargers	0	0	0	0	**0**
**Bengals**	7	14	7	3	**31**

at Riverfront Stadium, Cincinnati, Ohio

- Date: November 28
- Game time: 1:00 p.m. EST
- Game weather: 36 °F (2.2 °C), relative humidity 80%, wind 10 mph, wind chill 29
- Game attendance: 59,580
- Referee: Bob Frederic
- Box score

Game information

**First quarter**

- CIN – Fred Willis 2-yard run (Horst Muhlmann kick), 5:41. Bengals 7–0. **Drive: 11 plays, 80 yards, 4:22.**

**Second quarter**

- CIN – Bob Trumpy 10-yard pass from Virgil Carter (Horst Muhlmann kick), 11:57. Bengals 17–0. **Drive: 8 plays, 73 yards, 3:05.**
- CIN – Al Beauchamp 18-yard interception return (Horst Muhlmann kick), 3:42. Bengals 21–0.

**Third quarter**

- CIN – Fred Willis 3-yard run (Horst Muhlmann kick), 1:59. Bengals 28–0. **Drive: 17 plays, 86 yards, 9:21.**

**Fourth quarter**

- CIN – Horst Muhlmann 40-yard field goal, 13:06. Bengals 31–0. **Drive: 6 plays, 19 yards, 2:22.**

**Top passers**

- SDG – John Hadl – 5/18, 49 yards, 4 INT
- CIN – Virgil Carter – 19/24, 174 yards, TD, INT

**Top rushers**

- SDG – Mike Montgomery – 7 rushes, 30 yards
- CIN – Fred Willis – 2 rushes, 90 yards, 2 TD

**Top receivers**

- SDG – Pettis Norman – 1 reception, 28 yards
- CIN – Bruce Coslet – 5 receptions, 62 yards

==== Week 12: vs. Minnesota Vikings ====
Week Twelve: Minnesota Vikings at San Diego Chargers – Game summary

Quarter	1	2	3	4	Total
Vikings	7	7	0	0	**14**
**Chargers**	7	3	0	20	**30**

at San Diego Stadium, San Diego, California

- Date: December 5
- Game time: 1:00 p.m. PST
- Game weather: 55 °F (12.8 °C), relative humidity 45%, wind 8 mph
- Game attendance: 54,505
- Referee: Jack Reader
- Box score

Game information

**First quarter**

- SDG – Gary Garrison 5-yard pass from John Hadl (Dennis Partee kick), 7:46. Chargers 7–0. **Drive: 13 plays, 71 yards, 7:14.**
- MIN – Oscar Reed 10-yard run (Fred Cox kick), 1:56. Tied 7–7. **Drive: 11 plays, 64 yards, 5:50.**

**Second quarter**

- SDG – Dennis Partee 12-yard field goal, 8:57. Chargers 10–7. **Drive: 10 plays, 45 yards, 4:37.**
- MIN – Clint Jones 1-yard run (Fred Cox kick), 6:31. Vikings 14–10. **Drive: 5 plays, 78 yards, 2:26.**

**Third quarter**

- No scoring plays.

**Fourth quarter**

- SDG – Mike Garrett 5-yard pass from John Hadl (Dennis Partee kick), 13:14. Chargers 17–14. **Drive: 7 plays, 63 yards, 2:52.**
- SDG – Dennis Partee 43-yard field goal, 2:35. Chargers 20–14. **Drive: 5 plays, 30 yards, 2:51.**
- SDG – Dennis Partee 22-yard field goal, 1:27. Chargers 23–14. **Drive: 4 plays, 8 yards, 0:39.**
- SDG – Pete Barnes 36-yard interception return (Dennis Partee kick), 0:58. Chargers 30–14.

**Top passers**

- MIN – Bob Lee – 8/20, 122 yards, INT
- SDG – John Hadl – 20/29, 165 yards, 2 TD, INT

**Top rushers**

- MIN – Clint Jones – 26 rushes, 96 yards, TD
- SDG – Jerry LeVias – 2 rushes, 61 yards

**Top receivers**

- MIN – Bill Brown – 3 receptions, 61 yards
- SDG – Jerry LeVias – 7 receptions, 56 yards

==== Week 13: vs. Denver Broncos ====
Week Thirteen: Denver Broncos at San Diego Chargers – Game summary

Quarter	1	2	3	4	Total
Broncos	0	3	7	7	**17**
**Chargers**	7	7	14	17	**45**

at San Diego Stadium, San Diego, California

- Date: December 12
- Game time: 1:00 p.m. PST
- Game weather: 51 °F (10.6 °C), relative humidity 52%, wind 8 mph
- Game attendance: 44,347
- Referee: Ben Dreith
- Box score

Game information

**First quarter**

- SDG – Jeff Queen 9-yard pass from John Hadl (Dennis Partee kick), 2:20. Chargers 7–0. **Drive: 3 plays, 45 yards, 1:28.**

**Second quarter**

- DEN – Jim Turner 13-yard field goal, 10:13. Chargers 7–3. **Drive: 7 plays, 57 yards, 3:53.**
- SDG – Chuck Dicus 13-yard pass from John Hadl (Dennis Partee kick), 5:08. Chargers 14–3. **Drive: 11 plays, 78 yards, 5:05.**

**Third quarter**

- SDG – Gary Garrison 77-yard pass from John Hadl (Dennis Partee kick), 13:33. Chargers 21–3. **Drive: 2 plays, 72 yards, 1:27.**
- SDG – Jeff Queen 2-yard pass from John Hadl (Dennis Partee kick), 5:33. Chargers 28–3. **Drive: 14 plays, 72 yards, 5:51.**
- DEN – Floyd Little 12-yard run (Jim Turner kick), 1:01. Chargers 28–10. **Drive: 1 play, 24 yards, 0:18.**

**Fourth quarter**

- SDG – Dennis Partee 9-yard field goal, 10:15. Chargers 31–10. **Drive: 10 plays, 75 yards, 5:46.**
- DEN – Fran Lynch 40-yard pass from Steve Ramsey (Jim Turner kick), 7:56. Chargers 31–17. **Drive: 4 plays, 82 yards, 2:19.**
- SDG – Mike Garrett 1-yard run (Dennis Partee kick), 4:52. Chargers 38–17. **Drive: 4 plays, 80 yards, 3:04.**
- SDG – Walker Gillette 25-yard pass from Marty Domres (Dennis Partee kick), 1:54. Chargers 45–17. **Drive: 6 plays, 60 yards, 1:44.**

**Top passers**

- DEN – Steve Ramsey – 10/25, 169 yards, TD, 3 INT
- SDG – John Hadl – 21/36, 332 yards, 4 TD

**Top rushers**

- DEN – Floyd Little – 18 rushes, 96 yards, TD
- SDG – Mike Garrett – 15 rushes, 62 yards, TD

**Top receivers**

- DEN – Billy Masters – 4 receptions, 43 yards
- SDG – Jerry LeVias – 6 receptions, 83 yards

==== Week 14: at Houston Oilers ====
Week Fourteen: San Diego Chargers at Houston Oilers – Game summary

Quarter	1	2	3	4	Total
Chargers	0	23	7	3	**33**
**Oilers**	0	7	28	14	**49**

at Astrodome, Houston, Texas

- Date: November 28
- Game time: 1:00 p.m. CST
- Game weather: N/A (game played indoors)
- Game attendance: 35,959
- Box score

Game information

**First quarter**

- No scoring plays.

**Second quarter**

- SDG – Jeff Queen 4-yard run (Dennis Partee kick), 11:57. Chargers 7–0.
- SDG – Dennis Partee 50-yard field goal, 11:57. Chargers 10–0.
- HOU – Charlie Joiner 14-yard pass from Woody Campbell (Mark Moseley kick), 3:42. Chargers 10–7.
- SDG – Jeff Queen 5-yard run (Dennis Partee kick), 11:57. Chargers 17–7.
- SDG – Bob Babich 27-yard defensive fumble return (kick failed), 11:57. Chargers 23–7.

**Third quarter**

- HOU – Robert Holmes 1-yard run (Mark Moseley kick), 1:59. Chargers 23–14.
- SDG – Leon River 1-yard run (Dennis Partee kick), 1:59. Chargers 30–14.
- HOU – Ken Burrough 62-yard pass from Dan Pastorini (Mark Moseley kick), 3:42. Chargers 30–21.
- HOU – Ken Houston 35-yard interception return (Mark Moseley kick), 3:42. Chargers 30–28.
- HOU – Ken Houston 29-yard interception return (Mark Moseley kick), 3:42. Houston 35–30.

**Fourth quarter**

- SDG – Dennis Partee 20-yard field goal, 11:57. Houston 35–33.
- HOU – Robert Holmes 2-yard run (Mark Moseley kick), 1:59. Houston 42–33.
- HOU – Bob Atkins 25-yard interception return (Mark Moseley kick), 1:59. Houston 49–33.

**Top passers**

- SDG – John Hadl – 12/29, 147 yards, 3 INT
- HOU – Dan Pastorini – 14/22, 212 yards, TD, 3 INT

**Top rushers**

- SDG – Jeff Queen – 13 rushes, 53 yards, 2 TD
- HOU – Robert Holmes – 16 rushes, 92 yards, 2 TD

**Top receivers**

- SDG – Jerry LeVias – 5 receptions, 68 yards
- HOU – Ken Burrough – 4 receptions, 122 yards, TD

=== Standings ===
AFC West
	W	L	T	PCT	DIV	CONF	PF	PA	STK
Kansas City Chiefs	10	3	1	.769	4–1–1	8–2–1	302	208	W3
Oakland Raiders	8	4	2	.667	4–1–1	7–3–1	344	278	W1
San Diego Chargers	6	8	0	.429	2–4	4–7	311	341	L1
Denver Broncos	4	9	1	.308	1–5	3–6–1	203	275	L2

Note: Tie games were not officially counted in the standings until 1972.

== Awards ==
Walt Sweeney and Gary Garrison were named to the AFC Pro Bowl squad; No Chargers were named All-Pro by the Associated Press, though Sweeney was named the best in his Conference. Hadl was a runner-up for the AP NFL Most Valuable Player award, receiving one of the sixty available votes.
