= 1968 San Diego Chargers season =

NFL team season

- Owner: Eugene V. Klein
- General manager: Sid Gillman
- Head coach: Sid Gillman
- Home stadium: San Diego Stadium

Results
- Record: 9–5
- Division place: 3rd Western Division
- Playoffs: Did not qualify
- All-AFL: 5: FL Lance Alworth (1st team); S Kenny Graham (2nd team); T Ron Mix (1st team); RB Dickie Post (2nd team); G Walt Sweeney (1st team)
- AFL All-Stars: 7: FL Lance Alworth; E Gary Garrison; S Kenny Graham; QB John Hadl; TE Jacque MacKinnon; T Ron Mix; G Walt Sweeney

The 1968 season was the 9th season for the San Diego Chargers as a professional AFL franchise; the team improved on their 8–5–1 record from 1967, finishing at 9–5. This was also Sid Gillman's final full year as Chargers head coach.

== Offseason ==
=== NFL/AFL draft ===
1968 San Diego Chargers draft
Round	Pick	Player	Position	College	Notes
1	4	Russ Washington *	Tackle	Missouri	
1	18	Jim Hill	Cornerback	TAMUK	
2	43	Bill Lenkaitis	Center	Penn State	
4	100	Ken Dyer	Defensive back	Arizona State University	
5	129	Bill Perry	Tight end	Kent State	
7	183	Lane Fenner	Wide receiver	Florida State	
8	209	Elliot Gammage	Tight end	Tennessee	
9	237	Grundy Harris	Running back	Southern	
11	291	Dennis Partee	Kicker / Punter	SMU	
12	317	Jeff Queen	Linebacker	Morgan State	
13	345	Fred Combs	Defensive back	North Carolina State	
14	371	Jim Campbell	Linebacker	West Texas A&M	
15	399	Dan Kramarczyk	Tackle	Dayton	
15	403	Bob Wells	Tackle	Johnson C. Smith	
16	425	Dick Farley	Safety	Boston University	
17	453	Dan Andrews	Tight end	West Texas A&M	
Made roster * Made at least one Pro Bowl during career

=== Undrafted free agents ===
1968 undrafted free agents of note
Player	Position	College
Mike Fair	Quarterback	South Carolina
Curt Jones	Guard	Missouri
Dick Ries	Linebacker	Northern Arizona

== Roster ==
1968 San Diego Chargers roster
Quarterbacks (QB): 15 Jon Brittenum; 21 John Hadl; Running backs (RB): 32 Jim Allison; 37 Gene Foster; 22 Dickie Post; 20 Russ Smith; Wide receivers (WR): 19 Lance Alworth; 49 Ken Dyer S; 42 Lane Fenner; 27 Gary Garrison; 41 Phil Tuckett; Tight ends (TE): 83 Willie Frazier; 38 Jacque MacKinnon	Offensive linemen (OL): 71 Harold Akin T; 65 Sam Gruneisen C; 72 Gary Kirner G; 51 Bill Lenkaitis C; 73 Larry Little G; 74 Ron Mix T; 76 Terry Owens T; 64 Jim Schmedding G; 78 Walt Sweeney G; 77 Bob Wells T; Defensive linemen (DL): 70 Scott Appleton DT; 86 Ron Billingsley DT/DE; 68 Bob Briggs DT/DE; 82 Steve DeLong DE; 80 Houston Ridge DE; 85 Russ Washington DT	Linebackers (LB): 50 Chuck Allen MLB; 56 Bob Bruggers OLB; 58 Tom Erlandson OLB; 61 Jim Fetherston MLB; 89 Ron McCall OLB; 67 Bob Mitinger OLB; 81 Jeff Staggs OLB; Defensive backs (DB): 40 Joe Beauchamp FS; 45 Speedy Duncan CB; 36 Dick Farley FS; 33 Kenny Graham SS; 24 Bob Howard CB; 25 Dick Speights CB; 43 Jim Tolbert CB; 47 Bud Whitehead SS; Special teams (ST): 29 Dennis Partee K/P	Practice squad: 53 Jim Campbell LB; -- Tom Dempsey K; Reserve: 39 Jim Hill S (IR); 26 Brad Hubbert RB (IR); 31 Keith Lincoln RB (IR); 66 Rick Redman LB (IR); 87 Andre White TE (IR); Rookies in italics

== Preseason ==
Week	Date	Opponent	Result	Record	Venue	Attendance
1	August 3	San Francisco 49ers	W 30–18	1–0	San Diego Stadium	
2	August 10	at Oakland Raiders	L 7–31	1–1	Oakland–Alameda County Coliseum	
3	August 17	Pittsburgh Steelers	L 33–36	1–2	San Diego Stadium	
4	August 24	Los Angeles Rams	W 35–13	2–2	San Diego Stadium	
5	August 30	vs. Denver Broncos	W 6–3	3–2	Alamo Stadium (San Antonio)	

== Regular season ==
=== Schedule ===
Week	Date	Opponent	Result	Record	Venue	Attendance	Recap
1	September 6	**Cincinnati Bengals**	**W** 29–13	1–0	San Diego Stadium	33,687	Recap
2	Bye						
3	September 21	Houston Oilers	**W** 30–14	2–0	San Diego Stadium	46,217	Recap
4	September 29	at **Cincinnati Bengals**	**W** 31–10	3–0	Nippert Stadium	28,642	Recap
5	October 5	at New York Jets	**L** 20–23	3–1	Shea Stadium	63,786	Recap
6	October 13	at **Oakland Raiders**	**W** 23–14	4–1	Oakland–Alameda County Coliseum	53,257	Recap
7	October 20	**Denver Broncos**	**W** 55–24	5–1	San Diego Stadium	42,953	Recap
8	October 27	at **Kansas City Chiefs**	**L** 20–27	5–2	Municipal Stadium	50,344	Recap
9	November 3	Miami Dolphins	**W** 34–28	6–2	San Diego Stadium	37,284	Recap
10	November 10	at Boston Patriots	**W** 27–17	7–2	Fenway Park	19,278	Recap
11	November 17	at Buffalo Bills	**W** 21–6	8–2	War Memorial Stadium	27,993	Recap
12	November 24	New York Jets	**L** 15–37	8–3	San Diego Stadium	51,175	Recap
13	December 1	at **Denver Broncos**	**W** 47–23	9–3	Mile High Stadium	35,312	Recap
14	December 8	**Kansas City Chiefs**	**L** 3–40	9–4	San Diego Stadium	51,174	Recap
15	December 15	**Oakland Raiders**	**L** 27–34	9–5	San Diego Stadium	40,698	Recap
Note: Intra-division opponents are in **bold** text.

=== Game summaries ===
==== Week 1: vs. Cincinnati Bengals ====
Week One: San Diego Chargers at Cincinnati Bengals – Game summary

Quarter	1	2	3	4	Total
Bengals	7	3	3	0	**13**
**Chargers**	10	0	13	6	**29**

at San Diego Stadium, San Diego, California

- Date: September 6
- Game weather: 71 °F (21.7 °C), relative humidity 75%, wind 11 mph
- Game attendance: 33,687
- Box score

Game information

**First quarter**

- CIN – Paul Robinson 2-yard run (Dale Livingston kick). Bengals 7–0.
- SDG – Dennis Partee 42-yard field goal. Bengals 7–3.
- SDG – Dickie Post 48-yard run (Dennis Partee kick). Chargers 10–7.

**Second quarter**

- CIN – Dale Livingston 22-yard field goal. Tied 10–10.

**Third quarter**

- SDG – Brad Hubbert 1-yard run (Dennis Partee kick). Chargers 17–10.
- CIN – Dale Livingston 22-yard field goal. Chargers 17–13.
- SDG – Willie Frazier 48-yard pass from John Hadl (kick failed). Chargers 23–13.

**Fourth quarter**

- SDG – Willie Frazier 56-yard pass from John Hadl (kick failed). Chargers 29–13.

**Top passers**

- CIN – Dewey Warren – 14/26, 125 yards, INT
- SDG – John Hadl – 20/37, 325 yards, 2 TD

**Top rushers**

- CIN – Paul Robinson – 16 rushes, 33 yards, TD
- SDG – Dickie Post – 16 rushes, 140 yards, TD

**Top receivers**

- CIN – Tom Smiley – 6 receptions, 51 yards
- SDG – Gary Garrison – 5 receptions, 101 yards

==== Week 3: vs. Houston Oilers ====
Week Three: Houston Oilers at San Diego Chargers – Game summary

Quarter	1	2	3	4	Total
Oilers	0	7	7	0	**14**
**Chargers**	3	6	0	21	**30**

at San Diego Stadium, San Diego, California

- Date: September 21
- Game weather: 66 °F (18.9 °C), relative humidity 62%, wind 8 mph
- Game attendance: 46,217
- Box score

Game information

**First quarter**

- SDG – Dennis Partee 35-yard field goal. Chargers 3–0.

**Second quarter**

- SDG – Dennis Partee 23-yard field goal. Chargers 6–0.
- HOU – Woody Campbell 9-yard run (John Wittenborn kick). Oilers 7–6.
- SDG – Dennis Partee 48-yard field goal. Chargers 9–7.

**Third quarter**

- HOU – Hoyle Granger 1-yard run (John Wittenborn kick). Oilers 14–9.

**Fourth quarter**

- SDG – Brad Hubbert 3-yard run (Dennis Partee kick). Chargers 16–14.
- SDG – Lance Alworth 80-yard pass from John Hadl (Dennis Partee kick) . Chargers 23–14.
- SDG – Joe Beauchamp 24-yard interception return (Dennis Partee kick). Chargers 30–14.

**Top passers**

- HOU – Pete Beathard – 17/28, 170 yards, 2 INT
- SDG – John Hadl – 17/28, 265 yards, TD, 2 INT

**Top rushers**

- HOU – Sid Blanks – 12 rushes, 39 yards
- SDG – Brad Hubbert – 17 rushes, 65 yards, TD

**Top receivers**

- HOU – Mac Haik – 7 receptions, 80 yards
- SDG – Lance Alworth – 8 receptions, 183 yards, TD

==== Week 4: at Cincinnati Bengals ====
Week Four: San Diego Chargers at Cincinnati Bengals – Game summary

Quarter	1	2	3	4	Total
**Chargers**	0	17	0	14	**31**
Bengals	3	0	7	0	**10**

at Nippert Stadium, Cincinnati, Ohio

- Date: September 29
- Game weather: 62 °F (16.7 °C), relative humidity 63%, wind 5 mph
- Game attendance: 28,642
- Box score

Game information

**First quarter**

- CIN – Dale Livingston 21-yard field goal. Bengals 3–0.

**Second quarter**

- SDG – Gary Garrison 10-yard pass from John Hadl (Dennis Partee kick). Chargers 7–3.
- SDG – Dennis Partee 21-yard field goal. Chargers 10–3.
- SDG – Gary Garrison 19-yard pass from John Hadl (Dennis Partee kick). Chargers 17–3.

**Third quarter**

- CIN – Essex Johnson 6-yard run (Dale Livingston kick). Chargers 17–10.

**Fourth quarter**

- SDG – John Hadl 2-yard run (Dennis Partee kick). Chargers 24–10.
- SDG – John Hadl 1-yard run (Dennis Partee kick). Chargers 31–10.

**Top passers**

- SDG – John Hadl – 9/22, 132 yards, 2 TD, INT
- CIN – John Stofa – 12/21, 100 yards, INT

**Top rushers**

- SDG – Dickie Post – 14 rushes, 61 yards
- CIN – Paul Robinson – 12 rushes, 26 yards

**Top receivers**

- SDG – Gary Garrison – 5 receptions, 121 yards, 2 TD
- CIN – Rod Sherman – 8 receptions, 86 yards

==== Week 5: at New York Jets ====
Week Five: San Diego Chargers at New York Jets – Game summary

Quarter	1	2	3	4	Total
Chargers	0	7	6	7	**20**
**Jets**	3	6	7	7	**23**

at Shea Stadium, New York, New York

- Date: October 5
- Game weather: 53 °F (11.7 °C), relative humidity 48%, wind 15 mph
- Game attendance: 63,786
- Box score

Game information

**First quarter**

- NYJ – Jim Turner 26-yard field goal. Jets 3–0.

**Second quarter**

- SDG – Lance Alworth 7-yard pass from John Hadl (Dennis Partee kick). Chargers 7–3.
- NYJ – Jim Turner 45-yard field goal. Chargers 7–6.
- NYJ – Jim Turner 11-yard field goal. Jets 9–7.

**Third quarter**

- NYJ – Matt Snell 1-yard run (Jim Turner kick). Jets 16–7.
- SDG – Gary Garrison 84-yard pass from John Hadl (kick failed). Jets 16–13.

**Fourth quarter**

- SDG – Gary Garrison 5-yard pass from John Hadl (Dennis Partee kick). Chargers 20–16.
- NYJ – Emerson Boozer 1-yard run (Jim Turner kick). Jets 23–20.

**Top passers**

- SDG – John Hadl – 17/37, 326 yards, 3 TD, 3 INT
- NYJ – Joe Namath – 16/34, 220 yards

**Top rushers**

- SDG – Gene Foster – 7 rushes, 25 yards
- NYJ – Matt Snell – 16 rushes, 47 yards, TD

**Top receivers**

- SDG – Gary Garrison – 6 receptions, 163 yards, 2 TD
- NYJ – Don Maynard – 4 receptions, 59 yards

==== Week 6: at Oakland Raiders ====
Week Six: San Diego Chargers at Oakland Raiders – Game summary

Quarter	1	2	3	4	Total
**Chargers**	10	7	3	3	**23**
Raiders	0	14	0	0	**14**

at Oakland-Alameda County Coliseum, Oakland, California

- Date: October 13
- Game time: 1:04 p.m. PDT
- Game weather: 61 °F (16.1 °C), relative humidity 81%, wind 5 mph
- Game attendance: 53,257
- Box score

Game information

**First quarter**

- SDG – Dennis Partee 24-yard field goal, 11:46. Chargers 3–0. **Drive: 6 plays, 18 yards, 1:21.**
- SDG – Gene Foster 1-yard run (Dennis Partee kick), 4:03. Chargers 10–0. **Drive: 5 plays, 31 yards, 2:37.**

**Second quarter**

- OAK – George Atkinson 82-yard punt return (George Blanda kick), 3:19. Chargers 10–7.
- SDG – Lance Alworth 38-yard pass from John Hadl (Dennis Partee kick), 2:14. Chargers 17–7. **Drive: 2 plays, 38 yards, 0:34.**
- OAK – Warren Wells 7-yard pass from Daryle Lamonica (George Blanda kick), 0:21. Chargers 17–14. **Drive: 8 plays, 80 yards, 0:46.**

**Third quarter**

- SDG – Dennis Partee 27-yard field goal, 6:13. Chargers 20–14. **Drive: 9 plays, 45 yards, 4:25.**

**Fourth quarter**

- SDG – Dennis Partee 27-yard field goal, 14:15. Chargers 23–14. **Drive: 10 plays, 55 yards, 5:56.**

**Top passers**

- SDG – John Hadl – 14/32, 220 yards, TD, INT
- OAK – Daryle Lamonica – 13/32, 229 yards, TD, 2 INT

**Top rushers**

- SDG – Gene Foster – 27 rushes, 104 yards, TD
- OAK – Hewritt Dixon – 10 rushes, 21 yards

**Top receivers**

- SDG – Lance Alworth – 9 receptions, 182 yards, TD
- OAK – Fred Biletnikoff – 1 reception, 58 yards

==== Week 7: vs. Denver Broncos ====
Week Seven: Denver Broncos at San Diego Chargers – Game summary

Quarter	1	2	3	4	Total
Broncos	3	7	7	7	**24**
**Chargers**	3	28	10	14	**55**

at San Diego Stadium, San Diego, California

- Date: October 20
- Game time: 1:04 p.m. PDT
- Game weather: 65 °F (18.3 °C), relative humidity 76%, wind 7 mph
- Game attendance: 42,953
- Referee: Bob Finley
- Box score

Game information

**First quarter**

- SDG – Dennis Partee 18-yard field goal, 10:29. Chargers 3–0. **Drive: 10 plays, 58 yards, 4:31.**
- DEN – Bobby Howfield 15-yard field goal, 3:00. Tied 3–3. **Drive: 6 plays, 38 yards, 2:27.**

**Second quarter**

- SDG – Lance Alworth 74-yard pass from John Hadl (Dennis Partee kick), 12:11. Chargers 10–3. **Drive: 3 plays, 77 yards, 1:49.**
- SDG – Gary Garrison 21-yard pass from John Hadl (Dennis Partee kick), 8:05. Chargers 17–3. **Drive: 4 plays, 74 yards, 1:38.**
- SDG – Joe Beauchamp 35-yard interception return (Dennis Partee kick), 5:49. Chargers 24–3.
- SDG – Jacque MacKinnon 50-yard pass from John Hadl (Dennis Partee kick), 3:56. Chargers 31–3. **Drive: 3 plays, 51 yards, 1:05.**
- DEN – Jim Jones 60-yard pass from Marlin Briscoe (Bobby Howfield kick), 1:52. Chargers 31–10. **Drive: 4 plays, 80 yards, 2:04.**

**Third quarter**

- SDG – Gary Garrison 55-yard pass from John Hadl (Dennis Partee kick), 11:28. Chargers 38–10. **Drive: 3 plays, 74 yards, 0:18.**
- DEN – Billy Van Heusen 28-yard pass from Marlin Briscoe (Bobby Howfield kick), 6:38. Chargers 38–17. **Drive: 7 plays, 92 yards, 4:50.**
- SDG – Dennis Partee 27-yard field goal, 0:02. Chargers 41–17. **Drive: 6 plays, 9 yards, 2:28.**

**Fourth quarter**

- SDG – Dickie Post 62-yard run (Dennis Partee kick), 10:57. Chargers 48–17. **Drive: 2 plays, 71 yards, 0:56.**
- SDG – Jacque MacKinnon 17-yard pass from Jon Brittenum (Dennis Partee kick), 10:09. Chargers 55–17. **Drive: 1 play, 17 yards, 0:38.**
- DEN – Jim Jones 6-yard pass from Marlin Briscoe (Bobby Howfield kick), 5:09. Chargers 55–24. **Drive: 11 plays, 87 yards, 5:00.**

**Top passers**

- DEN – Marlin Briscoe – 17/30, 227 yards, 3 TD, 2 INT
- SDG – John Hadl – 9/18, 321 yards, 4 TD, INT

**Top rushers**

- DEN – Marlin Briscoe – 5 rushes, 68 yards
- SDG – Dickie Post – 11 rushes, 121 yards, TD

**Top receivers**

- DEN – Jim Jones – 8 receptions, 128 yards, 2 TD
- SDG – Jacque MacKinnon – 6 receptions, 172 yards, 2 TD

==== Week 8: at Kansas City Chiefs ====
Week Eight: San Diego Chargers at Kansas City Chiefs – Game summary

Quarter	1	2	3	4	Total
Chargers	0	10	3	7	**20**
**Chiefs**	7	10	0	10	**27**

at Municipal Stadium, Kansas City, Missouri

- Date: October 27
- Game time: 3:05 p.m. CST
- Game weather: 55 °F (12.8 °C), relative humidity 48%, wind 16 mph
- Game attendance: 50,344
- Referee: Jack Vest
- Box score

Game information

**First quarter**

- KAN – Robert Holmes 6-yard run (Jan Stenerud kick), 4:10. Chiefs 7–0. **Drive: 9 plays, 80 yards, 5:06.**

**Second quarter**

- SDG – Dennis Partee 19-yard field goal, 13:24. Chiefs 7–3. **Drive: 10 plays, 74 yards, 5:46.**
- SDG – Gary Garrison 9-yard pass from John Hadl (Dennis Partee kick), 11:25. Chargers 10–7. **Drive: 5 plays, 20 yards, 0:59.**
- KAN – Frank Pitts 55-yard pass from Len Dawson (Jan Stenerud kick), 9:41. Chiefs 14–10. **Drive: 4 plays, 67 yards, 1:04.**
- KAN – Jan Stenerud 29-yard field goal, 4:52. Chiefs 17–10. **Drive: 8 plays, 24 yards, 3:25.**

**Third quarter**

- SDG – Dennis Partee 36-yard field goal, 10:54. Chiefs 17–13. **Drive: 8 plays, 34 yards, 4:06.**

**Fourth quarter**

- SDG – Willie Frazier 5-yard pass from John Hadl (Dennis Partee kick), 11:58. Chargers 20–17. **Drive: 7 plays, 70 yards, 3:19.**
- KAN – Mike Garrett 13-yard run (Jan Stenerud kick), 8:33. Chiefs 24–20. **Drive: 6 plays, 66 yards, 3:25.**
- KAN – Jan Stenerud 37-yard field goal, 3:27. Chiefs 27–20. **Drive: 7 plays, 18 yards, 4:00.**

**Top passers**

- SDG – John Hadl – 19/36, 297 yards, 2 TD, 4 INT
- KAN – Len Dawson – 8/13, 180 yards, TD

**Top rushers**

- SDG – Dickie Post – 12 rushes, 61 yards
- KAN – Mike Garrett – 15 rushes, 89 yards, TD

**Top receivers**

- SDG – Lance Alworth – 6 receptions, 169 yards
- KAN – Frank Pitts – 2 receptions, 94 yards, TD

==== Week 9: vs. Miami Dolphins ====
Week Nine: Miami Dolphins at San Diego Chargers – Game summary

Quarter	1	2	3	4	Total
Dolphins	7	7	7	7	**28**
**Chargers**	7	10	7	10	**34**

at San Diego Stadium, San Diego, California

- Date: November 3
- Game time: 1:04 p.m. PST
- Game weather: 63 °F (17.2 °C), relative humidity 80%, wind 8 mph
- Game attendance: 37,284
- Referee: John McDonough
- Box score

Game information

**First quarter**

- MIA – Howard Twilley 10-yard pass from Bob Griese (Jimmy Keyes kick), 6:36. Dolphins 7–0. **Drive: 2 plays, 12 yards, 1:06.**
- SDG – Russ Smith 26-yard run (Dennis Partee kick), 3:05. Tied 7–7. **Drive: 6 plays, 78 yards, 3:31.**

**Second quarter**

- SDG – Gary Garrison 21-yard pass from John Hadl (Dennis Partee kick), 13:37. Chargers 14–7. **Drive: 5 plays, 28 yards, 2:07.**
- MIA – Doug Moreau 15-yard pass from Bob Griese (Jimmy Keyes kick), 1:15. Tied 14–14. **Drive: 3 plays, 53 yards, 0:55.**
- SDG – Dennis Partee 33-yard field goal, 0:04. Chargers 17–14. **Drive: 8 plays, 62 yards, 1:11.**

**Third quarter**

- MIA – Jim Kiick 4-yard run (Jimmy Keyes kick), 7:42. Dolphins 21–17. **Drive: 11 plays, 83 yards, 7:18.**
- SDG – Lance Alworth 23-yard pass from Jim Allison (Dennis Partee kick), 3:32. Chargers 24–21. **Drive: 9 plays, 69 yards, 4:10.**

**Fourth quarter**

- SDG – Lance Alworth 2-yard pass from John Hadl (Dennis Partee kick), 10:42. Chargers 31–21. **Drive: 11 plays, 64 yards, 4:18.**
- SDG – Dennis Partee 23-yard field goal, 3:15. Chargers 34–21. **Drive: 9 plays, 53 yards, 4:39.**
- MIA – Karl Noonan 19-yard pass from Bob Griese (Jimmy Keyes kick), 1:18. Chargers 34–28. **Drive: 4 plays, 80 yards, 1:57.**

**Top passers**

- MIA – Bob Griese – 20/27, 260 yards, 3 TD, INT
- SDG – John Hadl – 17/28, 228 yards, 2 TD, 2 INT

**Top rushers**

- MIA – Larry Csonka – 9 rushes, 61 yards
- SDG – Dickie Post – 21 rushes, 151 yards

**Top receivers**

- MIA – Howard Twilley – 7 receptions, 124 yards, TD
- SDG – Gary Garrison – 4 receptions, 62 yards, TD

==== Week 10: at Boston Patriots ====
Week Ten: San Diego Chargers at Boston Patriots – Game summary

Quarter	1	2	3	4	Total
**Chargers**	7	10	10	0	**27**
Patriots	3	0	0	14	**17**

at Fenway Park, Boston, Massachusetts

- Date: November 10
- Game time: 1:32 p.m. EST
- Game weather: 42 °F (5.6 °C), relative humidity 81%, wind 19 mph
- Game attendance: 19,278
- Referee: Bob Finley
- Box score

Game information

**First quarter**

- SDG – Russ Smith 37-yard run (Dennis Partee kick), 11:04. Chargers 7–0. **Drive: 7 plays, 82 yards.**
- BOS – Gino Cappelletti 35-yard field goal, 0:30. Chargers 7–3. **Drive: 4 plays, 2 yards.**

**Second quarter**

- SDG – Dennis Partee 32-yard field goal, 10:52. Chargers 10–3. **Drive: 5 plays, 6 yards.**
- SDG – Gary Garrison 67-yard pass from John Hadl (Dennis Partee kick), 4:53. Chargers 17–3. **Drive: 1 play, 67 yards.**

**Third quarter**

- SDG – Russ Smith 16-yard run (Dennis Partee kick), 7:39. Chargers 24–3. **Drive: 5 plays, 73 yards.**
- SDG – Dennis Partee 33-yard field goal, 6:01. Chargers 27–3. **Drive: 4 plays, 1 yard.**

**Fourth quarter**

- BOS – Jim Nance 1-yard run (Gino Cappelletti kick), 12:11. Chargers 27–10. **Drive: 1 play, 1 yard.**
- BOS – Gino Cappelletti 19-yard pass from Tom Sherman (Gino Cappelletti kick), 7:47. Chargers 27–17. **Drive: 7 plays, 45 yards.**

**Top passers**

- SDG – John Hadl – 5/23, 152 yards, TD, 2 INT
- BOS – Tom Sherman – 12/36, 107 yards, TD, 3 INT

**Top rushers**

- SDG – Russ Smith – 13 rushes, 93 yards, 2 TD
- BOS – Jim Nance – 23 rushes, 96 yards, TD

**Top receivers**

- SDG – Gary Garrison – 3 receptions, 89 yards, TD
- BOS – Gene Thomas – 5 receptions, 39 yards

==== Week 11: at Buffalo Bills ====
Week Eleven: San Diego Chargers at Buffalo Bills – Game summary

Quarter	1	2	3	4	Total
**Chargers**	7	14	0	0	**21**
Bills	3	0	3	0	**6**

at War Memorial Stadium, Buffalo, New York

- Date: November 17
- Game time: 1:30 p.m. EST
- Game weather: 34 °F (1.1 °C), relative humidity 95%, wind 15 mph, wind chill 25
- Game attendance: 27,993
- Referee: John McDonough
- Box score

Game information

**First quarter**

- SDG – Jacque MacKinnon 18-yard pass from John Hadl (Dennis Partee kick), 8:01. Chargers 7–0. **Drive: 6 plays, 63 yards, 4:05.**
- BUF – Bruce Alford 25-yard field goal, 2:08. Chargers 7–3. **Drive: 4 plays, 5 yards, 1:20.**

**Second quarter**

- SDG – Jacque MacKinnon 62-yard pass from John Hadl (Dennis Partee kick), 5:12. Chargers 14–3. **Drive: 1 play, 62 yards, 0:25.**
- SDG – Dickie Post 12-yard run (Dennis Partee kick), 1:54. Chargers 21–3. **Drive: 4 plays, 35 yards.**

**Third quarter**

- BUF – Bruce Alford 16-yard field goal, 9:09. Chargers 21–6. **Drive: 10 plays, 48 yards, 5:51.**

**Fourth quarter**

- No scoring plays.

**Top passers**

- SDG – John Hadl – 11/22, 223 yards, 2 TD, 3 INT
- BUF – Dan Darragh – 8/21, 38 yards

**Top rushers**

- SDG – Dickie Post – 15 rushes, 67 yards, TD
- BUF – Max Anderson – 12 rushes, 40 yards

**Top receivers**

- SDG – Jacque MacKinnon – 3 receptions, 103 yards, 2 TD
- BUF – Bobby Crockett – 1 reception, 20 yards

==== Week 12: vs. New York Jets ====
Week Twelve: New York Jets at San Diego Chargers – Game summary

Quarter	1	2	3	4	Total
**Jets**	10	17	3	7	**37**
Chargers	0	7	0	8	**15**

at San Diego Stadium, San Diego, California

- Date: November 24
- Game weather: 60 °F (15.6 °C), relative humidity 87%, wind 6 mph
- Game attendance: 51,175
- Box score

Game information

**First quarter**

- NYJ – Jim Turner 13-yard field goal. Jets 3–0.
- NYJ – Don Maynard 87-yard pass from Joe Namath (Jim Turner kick). Jets 10–0.

**Second quarter**

- NYJ – Matt Snell 3-yard run (Jim Turner kick). Jets 17–0.
- NYJ – Jim Turner 20-yard field goal. Jets 20–0.
- SDG – Speedy Duncan 95-yard punt return (Dennis Partee kick). Jets 20–7.
- NYJ – Bill Mathis 19-yard pass from Joe Namath (Jim Turner kick). Jets 27–7.

**Third quarter**

- NYJ – Jim Turner 30-yard field goal. Jets 30–7.

**Fourth quarter**

- NYJ – Bill Mathis 1-yard run (Jim Turner kick). Jets 37–7.
- SDG – Jacque MacKinnon 3-yard pass from John Hadl (Jacque MacKinnon pass from John Hadl). Jets 37–15.

**Top passers**

- NYJ – Joe Namath – 17/31, 337 yards, 2 TD, INT
- SDG – John Hadl – 19/46, 190 yards, TD, 4 INT

**Top rushers**

- NYJ – Matt Snell – 18 rushes, 91 yards, TD
- SDG – Dickie Post – 8 rushes, 30 yards

**Top receivers**

- NYJ – Don Maynard – 6 receptions, 166 yards, TD
- SDG – Gene Foster – 8 receptions, 100 yards

==== Week 13: at Denver Broncos ====
Week Thirteen: San Diego Chargers at Denver Broncos – Game summary

Quarter	1	2	3	4	Total
**Chargers**	21	10	0	16	**47**
Broncos	3	14	6	0	**23**

at Mile High Stadium, Denver, Colorado

- Date: December 1
- Game time: 2:00 p.m. MST
- Game weather: 29 °F (−1.7 °C), relative humidity 54%, wind 9 mph, wind chill 21
- Game attendance: 35,312
- Referee: Ben Dreith
- Box score

Game information

**First quarter**

- SDG – Lance Alworth 2-yard pass from John Hadl (Dennis Partee kick), 11:57. Chargers 7–0. **Drive: 6 plays, 13 yards, 3:03.**
- SDG – Russ Smith 35-yard run (Dennis Partee kick), 6:27. Chargers 14–0. **Drive: 8 plays, 80 yards, 4:03.**
- DEN – Bobby Howfield 30-yard field goal, 3:24. Chargers 14–3. **Drive: 5 plays, 57 yards, 3:03.**
- SDG – Lance Alworth 79-yard pass from John Hadl (Dennis Partee kick), 2:27. Chargers 21–3. **Drive: 3 plays, 80 yards, 0:52.**

**Second quarter**

- SDG – Lance Alworth 1-yard pass from John Hadl (Dennis Partee kick), 8:51. Chargers 28–3. **Drive: 15 plays, 86 yards, 6:33.**
- SDG – Dennis Partee 19-yard field goal, 5:32. Chargers 31–3. **Drive: 5 plays, 55 yards, 1:40.**
- DEN – Eric Crabtree 14-yard pass from Marlin Briscoe (Bobby Howfield kick), 1:21. Chargers 31–10. **Drive: 11 plays, 80 yards, 4:11.**
- DEN – Brendan McCarthy 11-yard pass from Marlin Briscoe (Bobby Howfield kick), 0:10. Chargers 31–17. **Drive: 5 plays, 40 yards, 1:11.**

**Third quarter**

- DEN – Eric Crabtree 24-yard pass from Marlin Briscoe (pass failed), 9:48. Chargers 31–23. **Drive: 6 plays, 38 yards, 3:32.**

**Fourth quarter**

- SDG – Gary Garrison 9-yard pass from John Hadl (Dennis Partee kick), 8:59. Chargers 38–23. **Drive: 5 plays, 18 yards, 2:55.**
- SDG – Safety, Marlin Briscoe tackled in end zone, 7:47. Chargers 40–23.
- SDG – Lance Alworth 4-yard pass from John Hadl (Dennis Partee kick), 1:56. Chargers 47–23. **Drive: 11 plays, 53 yards, 5:51.**

**Top passers**

- SDG – John Hadl – 21/35, 325 yards, 5 TD, INT
- DEN – Marlin Briscoe – 15/33, 218 yards, 3 TD

**Top rushers**

- SDG – Russ Smith – 18 rushes, 106 yards, TD
- DEN – Marlin Briscoe – 6 rushes, 56 yards

**Top receivers**

- SDG – Lance Alworth – 9 receptions, 171 yards, 4 TD
- DEN – Eric Crabtree – 4 receptions, 98 yards, 2 TD

==== Week 14: vs. Kansas City Chiefs ====
Week Fourteen: Kansas City Chiefs at San Diego Chargers – Game summary

Quarter	1	2	3	4	Total
**Chiefs**	7	14	14	5	**40**
Chargers	3	0	0	0	**3**

at San Diego Stadium, San Diego, California

- Date: December 8
- Game time: 1:03 p.m. PST
- Game weather: 57 °F (13.9 °C), relative humidity 52%, wind 5 mph
- Game attendance: 51,174
- Referee: Jack Vest
- Box score

Game information

**First quarter**

- SDG – Dennis Partee 28-yard field goal, 10:10. Chargers 3–0. **Drive: 4 plays, -1 yards, 0:54.**
- KAN – Gloster Richardson 5-yard pass from Len Dawson (Jan Stenerud kick), 1:58. Chiefs 7–3. **Drive: 3 plays, 11 yards, 1:32.**

**Second quarter**

- KAN – Mike Garrett 7-yard pass from Len Dawson (Jan Stenerud kick), 13:41. Chiefs 14–3. **Drive: 5 plays, 23 yards, 2:31.**
- KAN – Frank Pitts 68-yard pass from Len Dawson (Jan Stenerud kick), 5:11. Chiefs 21–3. **Drive: 6 plays, 84 yards, 3:30.**

**Third quarter**

- KAN – Mike Garrett 1-yard run (Jan Stenerud kick), 8:40. Chiefs 28–3. **Drive: 11 plays, 84 yards, 6:20.**
- KAN – Willie Lanier 75-yard interception return (Jan Stenerud kick), 1:26. Chiefs 35–3.

**Fourth quarter**

- KAN – Safety, Jon Brittenum sacked by Buck Buchanan in end zone, 13:30. Chiefs 37–3.
- KAN – Jan Stenerud 33-yard field goal, 8:21. Chiefs 40–3. **Drive: 4 plays, -6 yards, 1:30.**

**Top passers**

- KAN – Len Dawson – 7/12, 153 yards, 3 TD, INT
- SDG – John Hadl – 9/24, 110 yards, 6 INT

**Top rushers**

- KAN – Mike Garrett – 21 rushes, 69 yards, TD
- SDG – Dickie Post – 10 rushes, 47 yards

**Top receivers**

- KAN – Frank Pitts – 2 receptions, 95 yards, TD
- SDG – Gary Garrison – 4 receptions, 46 yards

==== Week 15: vs. Oakland Raiders ====
Week Fifteen: Oakland Raiders at San Diego Chargers – Game summary

Quarter	1	2	3	4	Total
**Raiders**	3	7	14	10	**34**
Chargers	3	10	6	8	**27**

at San Diego Stadium, San Diego, California

- Date: December 15
- Game time: 1:00 p.m. PST
- Game weather: 58 °F (14.4 °C), relative humidity 53%, wind 7 mph
- Game attendance: 40,698
- Referee: Walt Fitzgerald
- Box score

Game information

**First quarter**

- SDG – Dennis Partee 13-yard field goal, 9:58. Chargers 3–0. **Drive: 7 plays, 19 yards, 4:12.**
- OAK – George Blanda 28-yard field goal, 3:08. Tied 3–3. **Drive: 4 plays, 0 yards, 0:33.**

**Second quarter**

- SDG – Jacque MacKinnon 62-yard pass from John Hadl (Dennis Partee kick), 11:43. Chargers 10–3. **Drive: 6 plays, 89 yards, 1:52.**
- OAK – Fred Biletnikoff 13-yard pass from Daryle Lamonica (George Blanda kick), 0:37. Tied 10–10. **Drive: 11 plays, 80 yards, 1:57.**
- SDG – Dennis Partee 34-yard field goal, 0:11. Chargers 13–10. **Drive: 4 plays, 49 yards, 0:26.**

**Third quarter**

- OAK – Rodger Bird 22-yard interception return (George Blanda kick), 11:38. Raiders 17–13.
- OAK – Warren Wells 55-yard pass from Daryle Lamonica (George Blanda kick), 8:21. Raiders 24–13. **Drive: 2 plays, 52 yards, 0:40.**
- SDG – Dennis Partee 40-yard field goal, 5:31. Raiders 24–16. **Drive: 8 plays, 41 yards, 2:54.**
- SDG – Dennis Partee 42-yard field goal, 3:04. Raiders 24–19. **Drive: 7 plays, 25 yards, 1:42.**

**Fourth quarter**

- OAK – Charlie Smith 40-yard pass from Daryle Lamonica (George Blanda kick), 13:44. Raiders 31–19. **Drive: 2 plays, 42 yards, 0:41.**
- OAK – George Blanda 18-yard field goal, 12:05. Raiders 34–19. **Drive: 6 plays, 21 yards, 1:47.**
- SDG – Ken Dyer fumble recovery in end zone (Lance Alworth pass from John Hadl), 10:49. Raiders 34–27.

**Top passers**

- OAK – Daryle Lamonica – 18/39, 275 yards, 3 TD, 2 INT
- SDG – John Hadl – 21/52, 359 yards, TD, 2 INT

**Top rushers**

- OAK – Daryle Lamonica – 5 rushes, 41 yards
- SDG – Gene Foster – 18 rushes, 66 yards

**Top receivers**

- OAK – Warren Wells – 4 receptions, 113 yards, TD
- SDG – Gary Garrison – 4 receptions, 128 yards

=== Standings ===
AFL Western Division
	W	L	T	PCT	DIV	PF	PA	STK
Oakland Raiders	12	2	0	.857	6–2	453	233	W8
Kansas City Chiefs	12	2	0	.857	7–1	371	170	W5
San Diego Chargers	9	5	0	.643	5–3	382	310	L2
Denver Broncos	5	9	0	.357	1–7	255	404	L3
Cincinnati Bengals	3	11	0	.214	1–7	215	329	L3

Note: Tie games were not officially counted in the standings in the AFL.

== Awards ==
Seven Chargers were in the West team for the AFL All-Star game, while three were named to the Associated Press All-AFL first team and two to the second team. Also, Alworth and Hadl received votes for the AP AFL Player of the Year award (4 votes and 2 votes respectively), Washington received 2 votes for AFL Defensive Rookie of the Year, and Gillman received 3 votes for AFL Coach of the Year.

Player	Position	All-Star	AP 1st-team All-Pro	AP 2nd-team All-Pro
Lance Alworth	Flanker	Yes	Yes	
Gary Garrison	End	Yes		
Kenny Graham	Safety	Yes		Yes
John Hadl	Quarterback	Yes		
Jacque MacKinnon	Tight end	Yes		
Ron Mix	Tackle	Yes	Yes	
Dickie Post	Running back			Yes
Walt Sweeney	Guard	Yes	Yes	
