= Gary Garrison =

American football player (born 1944)

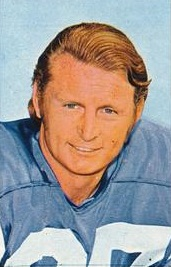
- Garrison c. 1971

No. 27, 82
- Position: Wide receiver

Personal information
- Born: January 21, 1944 (age 82); Amarillo, Texas, U.S.
- Listed height: 6 ft 2 in (1.88 m)
- Listed weight: 193 lb (88 kg)

Career information
- High school: Millikan (Long Beach, California)
- College: San Diego State (1962–1965)
- NFL draft: 1965: 6th round, 77th overall pick
- AFL draft: 1965: red shirt 1st round, 6th overall pick

Career history
- San Diego Chargers (1966–1976); Houston Oilers (1977)

Awards and highlights
- 4× Pro Bowl (1968, 1970–1972); Los Angeles Chargers Hall of Fame; San Diego Chargers 50th Anniversary Team

Career NFL statistics
- Receptions: 405
- Receiving yards: 7,538
- Receiving touchdowns: 58
- Stats at Pro Football Reference

Gary Lynn Garrison (born January 21, 1944) is an American former professional football player who was a wide receiver in the American Football League (AFL) and the National Football League (NFL). He played college football for the San Diego State Aztecs, where he recorded 26 receiving touchdowns, a mark that still is a career school record. At one time he held the NFL record with seven consecutive seasons of at least 40 receptions.

== Early life ==
Garrison was born on January 21, 1944, in Amarillo, Texas. His family later moved to Long Beach, California, and he attended Robert A. Millikan Senior High School in Long Beach, graduating in 1961. Garrison played on its football team. He began his high school career weighing only 150 pounds (68 kg), but built himself up to 170 pounds (77.1 kg) by his senior year. He played both offense (halfback) and defense (safety), and was All-City his junior (1959, first-team at halfback) and senior (1960, first-team at halfback) years.

== College ==
Garrison attended Long Beach City College, and played on the football team at City College two years, both on offense and defense. He became a starting halfback on the team in October 1961. He also played some games at starting safety for City College that year. Garrison played both halfback and in the defensive backfield on the 1962 City College team. The team won the first state championship "Potato Bowl" game, 66–8. In 1962, Garrison was selected to the All-Metropolitan Conference team as a defensive back.

Garrison then followed his City College receivers coach Phil Krueger to Utah State University. After arriving at Utah State, in May 1963 he played in the alumni-varsity exhibition game and injured his knee in the game severely enough that he required surgery. Garrison returned to his family home in Long Beach, and never played football at Utah State (though he did attend the school for one semester, but left and returned to Long Beach).

Living in Long Beach, he worked loading and unloading raw materials at a Procter & Gamble dock in Long Beach, not thinking he would go back to college. He began playing recreation league basketball and then began working out after he saw improvement in his knee. Fresno State University offered him a scholarship, and he began attending summer school there in 1964, but ultimately decided not to attend.

San Diego State University assistant coach Tom Bass developed an interest in Garrison. At the urging of his assistant coaches, future Pro Football Hall of Fame head coach Don Coryell, then head coach at San Diego State, came to Garrison's home to recruit Garrison. Coryell coached the Aztecs from 1961 to 1972, and was renowned as an innovator in the passing offense. Garrison agreed to attend San Diego State, where his quarterback would be future NFL coach Rod Dowhower.

Garrison played two years of Aztec football under Coryell (1964–65) as a receiver. In 1964, Garrison had 78 pass receptions for 1,272 yards and 15 touchdowns, the later two numbers being NCAA College Division records at the time. In a game against Fresno State University, where Krueger was now coaching, Garrison had 11 receptions for 289 yards and four touchdowns. He was the Aztec's Most Valuable Player in 1964. The following year (1965), he had 70 receptions and 14 touchdowns, although he missed two games. Garrison was All-American honorable mention both years. He was twice selected as a Little All-American at wide receiver. The Associated Press also named him first-team Little All-Pacific Coast.

At the time he graduated he held the school record for receiving touchdowns in a career (26) and receiving yards in a season (1,272).

He was selected to play in the Senior Bowl, East-West Shrine Bowl, and the Chicago College All-Star Game. Garrison was the first player from San Diego State ever selected to play in each of these games.

== Professional career ==
The National Football League's (NFL) Philadelphia Eagles drafted Garrison in the 6th round of the 1965 NFL draft, 77th overall. Sid Gillman of the American Football League's (AFL) San Diego Chargers drafted him in the first round of the 1965 AFL Redshirt draft, 6th overall. The Eagles traded Garrison's rights to the NFL's San Francisco 49ers, but Garrison still chose to play in San Diego, as it was closest to Long Beach and the Chargers had made him a good financial offer.

At one point, an Eagles representative had shown up with $5,000 in cash in an unsuccessful effort to sign Garrison. Coryell, aware of the bidding war between the AFL and NFL, had assigned one of his assistants, future Hall of Fame NFL coach Joe Gibbs, to look out for Garrison. Garrison was also already familiar with Gillman and the Chargers. During his coaching career with the Aztecs, Coryell would sometimes take his team to watch Gillman's Charger practices; and Coryell would also sometimes attend Gillman's coaching strategy video sessions to which he would bring some of his players, including Garrison, who was impressed by Gillman. By 1966, Tom Bass was a Chargers assistant coach, and also played a role in Garrison choosing the Chargers. While in college, Garrison also was a press box runner, dispensing game statistics in the San Diego Chargers press box.

Garrison began his pro football career with the San Diego Chargers in 1966, and played 11 seasons (1966–1976) for them in the AFL and NFL, as well as one year (1977) with the Houston Oilers under former Chargers assistant coach Bum Phillips. He started 11 games as a rookie, with 46 receptions for 642 yards and four touchdowns. The following year, he started every Charger game, with 44 receptions and a 17.5 yards per reception average.

For the first six years of his career in San Diego, Garrison played in the shadow of future Hall of Fame receiver Lance Alworth, who was the key player on the Chargers teams and is considered one of the NFL's one hundred greatest players. Alworth worked with and coached Garrison in developing as a receiver. During games, opposing teams' concern over Alworth left Garrison with single coverage. In 1968, Garrison averaged more yards per reception (21.2) than Alworth (19.3); and in 1969 he averaged 20.1 yards per reception to Alworth's 15.7, two years in which the 28-29 year-old Alworth was still in his prime and led the AFL in receptions. Garrison made his first AFL All-Star Game in 1968, and was named second-team All-AFL by The Sporting News that year.

In a then career-best game against the reigning world champion New York Jets on September 28, 1969, he caught ten passes for 188 yards and two touchdowns from quarterback John Hadl; and was named Player of the Week. He had been named Player of the Week a year earlier in an October 5 game against the Jets, when he caught 6 passes for 163 yards and two touchdowns, including an 84-yard touchdown reception. It has also been reported he was named Offensive Player of the Week one week earlier in 1968, when he caught five passes for 121 yards and two touchdowns against the Cincinnati Bengals. He missed a number of games in 1969 due to a cracked shoulder bone.

In 1970, he was named to the first post-AFL/NFL merger Pro Bowl. He was also named second-team All-American Football Conference by United Press International (UPI). Garrison was selected as the Chargers Most Valuable Player. Garrison had a career-high 12 touchdown catches (second best in the NFL), and his career-high 22.9 yards per reception was fourth best in the NFL. He was named to the Pro Bowl again in 1971 and 1972, and was again UPI second-team All-Conference both years. He had at least 40 receptions every year for the first seven years of his career. This was an NFL record at the time.

Garrison only played seven games in 1973, starting four, with 14 receptions. He was tackled and suffered a dislocated shoulder after a 51-yard pass reception in a September 30 game against the Cincinnati Bengals. This broke his NFL record streak of seven seasons with at least 40 receptions. One of his 1973 Charger teammates was legendary quarterback Johnny Unitas, playing in his final year, whom Garrison considered a football genius after discussing with Unitas how receivers are supposed to run their patterns. This was also future Hall of Fame quarterback Dan Fouts's first year with the Chargers.

Garrison played all 14 games in 1974, with 41 receptions for 785 yards. In 1975, he again started all 14 games, but only had 27 receptions. He played in only two games in 1976, after suffering a separated shoulder on September 19 from a hard hit by Tampa Bay Buccaneers' linebacker Steve Reese, that required season-ending surgery. The Chargers waived Garrison in July 1977, and he was signed immediately by the Houston Oilers. In his final NFL season, he played in only three games for the Oilers, with one reception.

Over his 12-year career, Garrison caught 405 passes for 7,538 yards and 58 touchdowns. He had over 100 yards receiving in 23 games. At the time he retired he was tied for 12th in career yards per reception, and is now tied for 18th all-time in yards per reception (18.6). He finished in the top-10 in yards per reception six times in the AFL and NFL during his career. While he ranks 135th for total receiving yards and 105th in touchdowns all-time (through 2024), Garrison played during what is sometimes called the "dead ball" era. This was during the time before 1978, after which the NFL began changing the rules to favor the offense, such as restricting the amount of physical play a defender can use against a receiver, and the rule allowing offensive lineman to extend and grab while blocking instead of keeping their fists closed.

In 1969, Garrison described how he altered his playing style to keep his head up, instead of down, when leaving the line of scrimmage so he did not "get his head knocked off"; and worked to develop double moves to get away from defenders, who could get physical with receivers as long as the ball had not been thrown.

His nickname was the "Ghost".

== Legacy and honors ==
During Garrison's first five years, the Chargers were coached by future Hall of Fame head coach Sid Gillman, one of the great offensive passing innovators in football history, who the Pro Football Hall of Fame calls "the foremost authority on passing offense". In January 1970, Gillman stated there might be ends in football as good as Garrison, but there were none better. Gillman favorably compared Garrison's best qualities as a receiver to Baltimore Colts Hall of Fame receiver Raymond Berry (another top-100 all-time NFL player). While recognizing Garrison's speed, ability to accelerate and sure hands, he emphasized that what made Garrison exceptional was his hard work, conscientiousness in perfecting his receiving craft, and his focus on thinking and planning as a receiver. Gillman called him "The Young Artist".

In 1985, Garrison was inducted into the Chargers Hall of Fame. In 2009, Garrison was one of 50 San Diego Chargers Hall of Fame members honored as part of the team's 50th anniversary celebration. In 1988, Garrison was inducted into the San Diego State Hall of Fame, and the San Diego Hall of Champions. The Long Beach Century Club selected Garrison as its 1969 Athlete of the Year.

== Personal life ==
While still playing, Garrison amassed a stable of quarterhorses, and after his retirement had a profitable career in breeding, raising, training and selling them. In 1975, he co-founded the coin-operated video game manufacturer Cinematronics with teammate Dennis Partee.

== NFL career statistics ==
Legend
	Led the league
**Bold**	Career high

=== Regular season ===
Year	Team	Games		Receiving				
Year	Team	GP	GS	Rec	Yds	Avg	Lng	TD
1966	SD	**14**	11	46	642	14.0	36	4
1967	SD	**14**	**14**	44	772	17.5	62	2
1968	SD	**14**	**14**	**52**	**1,103**	21.2	**84**	10
1969	SD	10	10	40	804	20.1	50	7
1970	SD	**14**	**14**	44	1,006	22.9	67	**12**
1971	SD	**14**	**14**	42	889	21.2	77	6
1972	SD	**14**	13	**52**	744	14.3	52	7
1973	SD	7	4	14	292	20.9	51	2
1974	SD	**14**	**14**	41	785	19.1	71	5
1975	SD	**14**	**14**	27	438	16.2	40	2
1976	SD	2	2	2	58	**29.0**	36	1
1977	HOU	3	0	1	5	5.0	5	0
Career		134	124	405	7,538	18.6	84	58
