= Billy Parks =

American football player (1948–2009)

No. 32, 21, 20
- Position: Wide receiver

Personal information
- Born: January 1, 1948; Santa Monica, California, U.S.
- Died: July 22, 2009 (aged 61); Hawi, Hawaii, U.S.
- Listed height: 6 ft 1 in (1.85 m)
- Listed weight: 185 lb (84 kg)

Career information
- High school: Culver City (Culver City, California)
- College: Long Beach State
- NFL draft: 1970: 6th round, 146th overall pick

Career history
- San Diego Chargers (1970–1971); Dallas Cowboys (1972); Houston Oilers (1973–1975)

Awards and highlights
- NFL All-Rookie team (1971); All-American (1968)

Career NFL statistics
- Games played: 60
- Receptions: 123
- Receiving yards: 1826
- Touchdowns: 7
- Stats at Pro Football Reference

William James Parks (January 1, 1948 – July 22, 2009) was an American professional football player who was a wide receiver in the National Football League (NFL) for the San Diego Chargers, Dallas Cowboys, and Houston Oilers. He played college football for the Long Beach State 49ers.

== Early life ==
Parks attended Culver City High School, where he played quarterback and defensive back. He moved on to Santa Monica College, where he was moved to wide receiver after suffering a preseason concussion. In 1966, he set a school record with 9 touchdown receptions in a season.

In 1967, he transferred to Long Beach State University, where he became the school's first All-American. He had his best season as a sophomore, catching 79 passes (second in the nation) for 1,294 yards and 12 touchdowns. He was named All-American in 1968 as a junior, but was injured much of his senior year.

Parks holds the school marks for receiving yards in a career (2,919), receiving yards in a game (298, versus UCSB in 1968), yards in a season (1,294 in 1967) and career touchdowns (22). He also recorded 169 career receptions.

In 1986, he was inducted into the Long Beach State University Hall of Fame.

== Professional career ==
=== San Diego Chargers ===
Parks was selected by the San Diego Chargers in the sixth round (146th overall) of the 1970 NFL draft. He sat the entire 1970 season because of injuries.

In 1971, he replaced Lance Alworth in the lineup and led the NFL in catches (41 catches) during the first ten games of the season, before being sidelined with a broken arm he suffered in the 10th game. He was named to the 1971 NFL All-rookie team.

In 1972, the Chargers coveted running back Duane Thomas, the team traded Parks along with running back Mike Montgomery to the Dallas Cowboys in exchange for him on August 1.

=== Dallas Cowboys ===
In 1972 he was a backup wide receiver until the eighth game, when he was promoted to replace Lance Alworth. He would have a disappointing regular season with only 18 receptions, but he was a key player in the come from behind win over the San Francisco 49ers in the playoffs, catching 7 passes for 136 yards and a touchdown, in what turned out to be his best game as a professional.

Parks was traded along with Tody Smith before the start of the 1973 season to the Houston Oilers, in exchange for their first and third round draft picks in the 1974 NFL draft. For the first time in their history, the Dallas Cowboys had the first overall draft choice which they used to select Ed "Too Tall" Jones. The team used the third round draft choice to select Danny White.

=== Houston Oilers ===
During his first season with the Oilers in 1973, he had a career-high of 43 catches. He grabbed another 20 passes in 1974, but only caught 1 pass in 10 games in 1975.

Parks retired after the 1975 season having played in the NFL for 5 seasons. He caught 123 passes for 1,826 yards and 7 touchdowns in his career.

== Personal life ==
Parks succumbed to melanoma at age 61 in Hawaii.
