= Jon Brittenum =

American football player (1944–2022)

No. 15
- Position: Quarterback

Personal information
- Born: May 27, 1944; Brinkley, Arkansas, U.S.
- Died: October 13, 2022 (aged 78)
- Listed height: 6 ft 0 in (1.83 m)
- Listed weight: 185 lb (84 kg)

Career information
- High school: Brinkley (AR)
- College: Arkansas
- NFL draft: 1967: undrafted

Career history
- Miami Dolphins (1967)*; San Diego Chargers (1968)
- * Offseason or practice squad member only

Awards and highlights
- 2× First-team All-SWC (1965, 1966)
- Stats at Pro Football Reference

Jon Roger Brittenum (May 27, 1944 – October 13, 2022) was an American professional football player who was a quarterback for the San Diego Chargers in the American Football League (AFL) for one season in 1968. He earlier played college football for the Arkansas Razorbacks.

== Early life ==
Brittenum was born in Brinkley, Arkansas, on May 27, 1944. He attended Brinkley High School in his hometown. He then studied at the University of Arkansas, where he played for the Arkansas Razorbacks from 1963 to 1966 (with 1964 being his redshirt year). He was the starting quarterback during his junior and senior seasons and was named an All-Southwest Conference in both years. He left the 1966 Cotton Bowl Classic early with a separated shoulder that ultimately ended with the Razorbacks losing 14–7 to the LSU Tigers, ending the school's streak of 22 consecutive victories.

== Professional career ==
Brittenum was selected by the Miami Dolphins in the eighth round (64th overall) of the 1966 AFL Redshirt draft. He only featured on the team's practice squad, and was subsequently traded to the San Diego Chargers in exchange for its third-round pick in the 1968 NFL/AFL draft.

Brittenum made his AFL debut with the Chargers on September 6, 1968, at the age of 24, in a 29–13 win against the Cincinnati Bengals. In a game on December 8 that same year, he replaced John Hadl – who completed just 9 of 25 passes and had six interceptions made off him – in the fourth quarter, but was promptly tackled in his own end zone by Buck Buchanan for a safety. The Chargers ultimately lost that game 40–3 against the Kansas City Chiefs, eliminating them from AFL Western Division contention. In his 14 games in the AFL, Brittenum scored one touchdown, completed 9 of 17 passes, and registered 125 passing yards and −4 rushing yards.

== Later life ==
After retiring from professional football, Brittenum managed Brittenum & Associates, an investment banking firm based in Little Rock, Arkansas. Both the company and Brittenum filed for bankruptcy in 1986. He was subsequently charged with misappropriating his investors' money, with 15 savings and loan associations claiming $30.6 million against his company. Brittenum faced a maximum sentence of 20 years imprisonment, but was handed a five-year suspended sentence, 100 hours of community service, and restitution to four of his clients for $4 million. In the early 1990s, Brittenum managed a telemarketing firm based in North Little Rock.

Brittenum was selected for the University of Arkansas Sports Hall of Honor in 2020, and was inducted the following year. He was also named to the Arkansas Razorbacks All-Decade team for the 1960s. He died on October 13, 2022, in South Texas. He was 78, and suffered from ill health in the years prior to his death.
