= Lane Fenner =

American football player (born 1945)

No. 42
- Position: Wide receiver

Personal information
- Born: December 7, 1945 (age 80); Evansville, Indiana, U.S.
- Listed height: 6 ft 5 in (1.96 m)
- Listed weight: 210 lb (95 kg)

Career information
- High school: North (Evansville)
- College: Florida State (1964-1967)
- NFL draft: 1968: 7th round, 183rd overall pick

Career history
- San Diego Chargers (1968)
- Stats at Pro Football Reference

Lane Fenner (born December 7, 1945) is an American former professional football player who was a wide receiver for the San Diego Chargers of the National Football League (NFL) in 1968. He played college football for the Florida State Seminoles, and was a notable figure in the early development of the Florida–Florida State football rivalry. In the closing seconds of the 1966 game between the two Florida schools, Fenner came down with what was apparently a game-winning touchdown catch. The closest official ruled that Fenner was out of bounds, and the Gators won the game. The Tallahassee Democrat published photos appearing to show Fenner with possession, in bounds, and the end of the game would be disputed by Florida State fans for years.
