= Reggie Berry =

American football player (born 1950)

No. 45
- Position: Defensive back

Personal information
- Born: March 13, 1950 (age 76); Minneapolis, Minnesota
- Listed height: 6 ft 0 in (1.83 m)
- Listed weight: 190 lb (86 kg)

Career information
- High school: Minneapolis (MN) Central
- College: Long Beach State

Career history
- San Diego Chargers (1972–1974); Philadelphia Bell (1975)
- Stats at Pro Football Reference

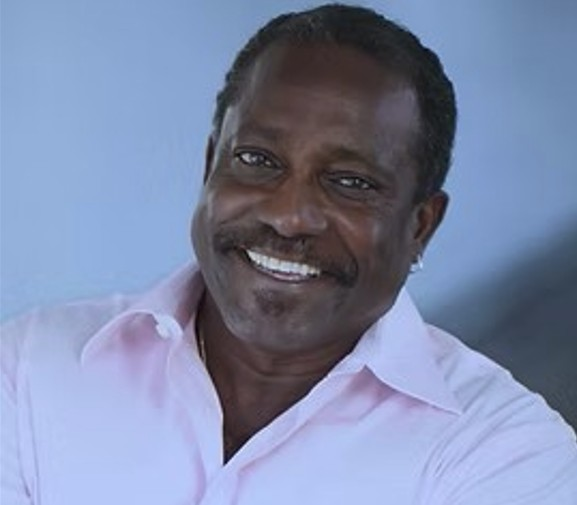
Reginald "Reggie" Berry

Reggie Berry (born March 13, 1950) is an American former football defensive back. He played for the San Diego Chargers from 1972 to 1974 and for the Philadelphia Bell in 1975.
