= Jesse Taylor (American football) =

American football player (1948–2023)

- Taylor, circa 1974

No. 44, 42
- Position: Running back

Personal information
- Born: May 26, 1948; Pittsburgh, Pennsylvania, U.S.
- Died: July 1, 2023 (aged 75)
- Listed height: 6 ft 0 in (1.83 m)
- Listed weight: 200 lb (91 kg)

Career information
- High school: Kiski Area (Leechburg, Pennsylvania)
- College: Cincinnati
- NFL draft: 1971: 10th round, 244th overall pick

Career history
- Washington Redskins (1971)*; Norfolk Neptunes (1971); Los Angeles Rams (1972)*; San Diego Chargers (1972); Pittsburgh Steelers (1974)*
- * Offseason or practice squad member only
- Stats at Pro Football Reference

Jesse Clarence Taylor Jr. (May 26, 1948 – July 1, 2023) was an American professional football running back who played for the San Diego Chargers of the National Football League (NFL). He played college football for the Cincinnati Bearcats and was selected by the Washington Redskins in the tenth round of the 1971 NFL draft.

== Early life ==
Jesse Clarence Taylor Jr. was born on May 26, 1948, in Pittsburgh, Pennsylvania. He participated in football wrestling, and track at Kiski Area High School in Leechburg, Pennsylvania. He earned eight varsity letters overall in high school. Taylor was inducted into the Kiski Area Sports Hall of Fame in 2010.

== College career ==
Taylor enrolled at the University of Cincinnati to play college football for the Bearcats. He played for the freshman team in 1967, rushing for a team-leading 154 yards on 61 carries as the Bearcat freshman went undefeated with a 3–0 record. He was a three-year varsity letterman at fullback from 1968 to 1970. Taylor finished his varsity career with 277 carries for 1,015 yards and 16 touchdowns, and 54 receptions for 426 yards and three touchdowns.

== Professional career ==
Taylor was selected by the Washington Redskins in the seventh round, with the 244th overall pick, of the 1978 NFL draft. He was released on September 1, 1971, after the fourth of six preseason games. He then signed with the Norfolk Neptunes of the Atlantic Coast Football League for the 1971 season.

Taylor signed with the Los Angeles Rams for the 1972 season. On July 31, he was traded to the San Diego Chargers for a draft pick. He played in all 14 games for the Chargers during the 1972 season as a reserve running back and special teams player, rushing 13 times for 58 yards while also returning 31 kicks for 676 yards. Taylor led the team in kick return yards. On November 26, 1972, in the first quarter of a game against the Houston Oilers, Taylor blocked a punt and then recovered it in the end zone for a Chargers touchdown. The Chargers went on to win 30–24. Taylor was released on August 6, 1973, after the first game of the 1973 preseason.

After contacting Pittsburgh Steelers' offensive line coach Dan Radakovich, one of his coaches at Cincinnati, Taylor signed with the Steelers for the 1974 season. He was released on August 13, 1974, after the second preseason game.

== Personal life ==
Taylor, his wife, and three children lived in Sewickley, Pennsylvania. He worked at the Pittsburgh International Airport and Sewickley Car Store. He was a member of the Sewickley American Legion Post 450. Taylor died on July 1, 2023.
