= Oscar Dragon =

American football player (born 1950)

No. 34
- Position: Running back

Personal information
- Born: March 2, 1950 (age 76); Madera, California, U.S.
- Listed height: 6 ft 0 in (1.83 m)
- Listed weight: 214 lb (97 kg)

Career information
- High school: Chowchilla (CA)
- College: Arizona State
- NFL draft: 1972: 17th round, 423rd overall pick

Career history
- San Diego Chargers (1972)
- Stats at Pro Football Reference

Oscar Lee Dragon (born March 2, 1950) is an American former professional football player who was a running back for the San Diego Chargers of the National Football League (NFL) in 1972. He played college football for the Arizona State Sun Devils.
