= Ken Dyer =

American football player (1946–2010)

No. 49, 27
- Positions: Safety, flanker

Personal information
- Born: March 16, 1946; Ann Arbor, Michigan, U.S.
- Died: March 7, 2010 (aged 63); Gilbert, Arizona, U.S.
- Listed height: 6 ft 3 in (1.91 m)
- Listed weight: 190 lb (86 kg)

Career information
- High school: Ann Arbor
- College: Arizona State (1964–1967)
- NFL draft: 1968: 4th round, 100th overall pick

Career history
- San Diego Chargers (1968–1969); Cincinnati Bengals (1969–1971)

Career NFL/AFL statistics
- Interceptions: 3
- Fumble recoveries: 1
- Receptions: 1
- Receiving yards: 22
- Total touchdowns: 1
- Stats at Pro Football Reference

Kenneth James Dyer (March 16, 1946 – March 7, 2010) was an American professional football player who played three seasons with the Cincinnati Bengals and San Diego Chargers. He was selected by the Chargers in the fourth round of the 1968 NFL/AFL draft after played college football at Arizona State University.

== Early life and college ==
Kenneth James Dyer was born on March 16, 1946, in Ann Arbor, Michigan. He attended Ann Arbor High School in Ann Arbor, participating in football, track, and basketball. He helped the football team win the state title in 1962. Dyer also earned Associated Press first-team All-State honors in football in high school. He set the Michigan high jump record as a senior. He graduated from Ann Arbor High in 1964. Dyer was inducted into the school's athletics hall of fame in 2005.

Dyer was a member of the Arizona State Sun Devils from 1964 to 1967 and a three-year letterman from 1965 to 1967. He began his college career as a wide receiver before converting to tight end in 1967. He caught 20 passes for 215 yards and one touchdown in 1965, 29 passes for 496 yards and two touchdowns in 1966, and 39 passes for 654 yards and four touchdowns in 1967. Dyer also participated in track while at Arizona State.

== Professional career ==
Dyer was selected by the San Diego Chargers of the American Football League (AFL) in the fourth round, with the 100th overall pick, of the 1968 NFL/AFL draft. He played in 14 games for the Chargers as a flanker and safety during the 1968 season, recording one reception for 22 yards and one fumble recovery touchdown. He did not appear in any games in 1969 before being released in late October.

Dyer was signed by the Cincinnati Bengals of the AFL in late October 1969 but did not play in any games that year. He appeared in 12 games, starting six, for the Bengals in 1970 as a safety and intercepted three passes for 45 yards. He also started one playoff game in 1970. Dyer played in one game, a start on October 3, 1971, during the 1971 season and broke his neck while attempting to tackle Green Bay Packers running back John Brockington, ending his playing career.

== Personal life ==
Dyer served in the United States Army. After his football career, he sold insurance and worked in the industrial chemical industry. He also owned a dry cleaning plant. Dyer coached high school and pop warner football for over 20 years as well.

Dyer died of heart failure on March 7, 2010, in Gilbert, Arizona.
