= Lee Thomas (American football) =

American football player (born 1946)

No. 73, 78
- Position: Defensive end

Personal information
- Born: March 12, 1946 (age 80); Karnack, Texas, U.S.
- Listed height: 6 ft 5 in (1.96 m)
- Listed weight: 246 lb (112 kg)

Career information
- High school: George Washington (Karnack)
- College: Jackson State
- NFL draft: 1971: undrafted

Career history
- San Diego Chargers (1971–1972); Cincinnati Bengals (1973)

Career NFL statistics
- Games played: 32
- Stats at Pro Football Reference

Lee Edward Thomas (born March 12, 1946) is an American former professional football player who was a defensive end for the San Diego Chargers and Cincinnati Bengals of the National Football League.

Thomas was born March 12, 1946, in Karnack, Texas. After graduating from George Washington High School, he played college football for the Jackson State Tigers.
