= Mel Rogers =

American football player (born 1947)

No. 53, 57, 51
- Position: Linebacker

Personal information
- Born: April 23, 1947 (age 79); St. Petersburg, Florida, U.S.
- Listed height: 6 ft 2 in (1.88 m)
- Listed weight: 231 lb (105 kg)

Career information
- High school: Gibbs (St. Petersburg)
- College: Florida A&M
- NFL draft: 1970: undrafted

Career history
- San Diego Chargers (1971, 1973–1974); Los Angeles Rams (1976); Chicago Bears (1977)
- Stats at Pro Football Reference

Mel Rogers (born April 23, 1947) is a former American professional football player who was a linebacker in the National Football League (NFL) during the 1970s.

Rogers played college football at Florida A&M University, where he was part of the Rattlers program. Although he was not selected in the 1970 NFL draft, he went on to play six seasons in the NFL. He began his professional career with the San Diego Chargers in 1971, returned to the team from 1973 to 1974, and later played for the Los Angeles Rams in 1976 and the Chicago Bears in 1977.
