= Mike Montgomery (American football) =

American football player (born 1949)

No. 23, 24
- Position: Running back / Wide receiver

Personal information
- Born: July 10, 1949 (age 77); Wichita Falls, Texas, U.S.
- Listed height: 6 ft 2 in (1.88 m)
- Listed weight: 210 lb (95 kg)

Career information
- High school: Dodge City (Dodge City, Kansas)
- College: Kansas State
- NFL draft: 1971: 3rd round, 65th overall pick

Career history
- San Diego Chargers (1971); Dallas Cowboys (1972–1973); Houston Oilers (1974–1975)

Career NFL statistics
- Games played: 37
- Rushing att-yards: 96-297
- Receptions-yards: 59-835
- Touchdowns: 10
- Stats at Pro Football Reference

James Michael Montgomery (born July 10, 1949) is an American former professional football player who was a running back in the National Football League (NFL) for the San Diego Chargers, Dallas Cowboys and Houston Oilers. He played college football for the Kansas State Wildcats.

== Early life ==
Montgomery attended Dodge City High School, where he played as a quarterback, before being switched to running back as senior. He contributed to the team's 1966 undefeated season, although it resulted only in a league championship title, because at the time there was no playoff system or state championship game.

He accepted a football scholarship from Kansas State University, where he played as a running back and wide receiver. In 1969, he posted 408 rushing yards (second on the team), 217 receiving yards and 4 touchdowns. As a senior, he registered 436 rushing yards (second on the team), 386 receiving yards and 4 touchdowns.

== Professional career ==
=== San Diego Chargers ===
Montgomery was selected by the San Diego Chargers in the third round (65th overall) of the 1971 NFL draft. Because of his versatility he was used at running back (60 carries for 226 yards and one touchdown), wide receiver (28 receptions for 361 yards and 2 touchdowns), quarterback (3 of 6 attempts for 80 yards and one touchdown) and on special teams (2 fumble recoveries).

On August 1, 1972, he was traded along with wide receiver Billy Parks to the Dallas Cowboys in exchange for running back Duane Thomas, who was a player the Chargers coveted.

=== Dallas Cowboys ===
In 1972, he was a backup running back. Playing against his former team the San Diego Chargers, he returned a fumble 54 yards for a touchdown on special teams. He registered 8 receptions for 131 yards, 3 receiving touchdowns, 35 rushes for 81 yards and one rushing touchdown.

In 1973, he was moved to wide receiver during training camp. He replaced Otto Stowe in the starting lineup after he suffered a broken ankle in the seventh game of the season against the Philadelphia Eagles, but Montgomery would also fell to injury in the next game and open the door for third-string rookie Drew Pearson to take over and never relinquish the position. He finished the season with 14 receptions for 164 yards and 3 touchdowns.

On July 5, 1974, he was traded to the Houston Oilers, after he signed a contract for the 1975 season with the Birmingham Americans of the World Football League. The Cowboys received a fourth round draft choice (#90-Pat Donovan).

=== Houston Oilers ===
On October 24, 1974, he suffered a serious knee injury against the St. Louis Cardinals. He later had a blood clot from complications from the surgery. He appeared in 5 games and made 9 receptions for 179 yards and one touchdown.

Montgomery spent the next year on the injured reserve list. On August 24, 1976, he was released after not being able to fully recover from his previous injury.
