= Ray White (American football) =

American football player (1949–2025)

Profile
- Positions: Linebacker, tight end

Personal information
- Born: May 18, 1949; Weymouth, Massachusetts, U.S.
- Died: April 13, 2025 (aged 75)

Career information
- High school: Weymouth
- College: Syracuse
- NFL draft: 1971: 5th round, 117th overall pick

Career history
- San Diego Chargers (1971–1973); St. Louis Cardinals (1975–1976)
- Stats at Pro Football Reference

Raymond C. White (May 18, 1949 – April 13, 2025) was an American professional football player who was a linebacker and tight end for four seasons in the National Football League (NFL) for the San Diego Chargers and St. Louis Cardinals. He played college football for the Syracuse Orange.

== College career ==
A 1967 graduate of Weymouth High School, White played college football and lacrosse at Syracuse University. White was a running back at Syracuse and scored three touchdowns his senior season in 1970. He won the school's Joe Alexander Award for excellence in football, scholarship, and citizenship. Following the regular season, he was selected to play in the East-West Shrine Bowl and the Hula Bowl in January 1971.

== Professional career ==
White was selected in the fifth round with the 117th overall pick by the Chargers in the 1971 NFL draft. As a rookie he played in all 14 games for San Diego, primarily on special teams, and recorded a safety. The next season, the Chargers switched him to tight end. White then missed the 1973 season due to injury.

He was released by the Chargers prior to the 1974 season and signed with the St. Louis Cardinals as a free agent in June, 1975. He again played all 14 games, starting once and recording a single sack. The following season he moved from outside linebacker to middle linebacker, starting five straight games and recording two interceptions and a half of a sack. His season was cut short by a knee injury against Dallas in October.

== Personal life and death ==
Following his playing career, White worked as a pilot for Southwest Airlines.

White died from Alzheimer's disease on April 13, 2025, at the age of 75.
