= Dennis Partee =

American football player (born 1946)

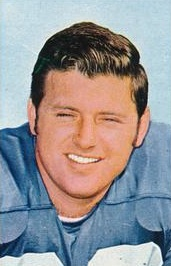
- Partee c. 1971

No. 29
- Positions: Placekicker, Punter

Personal information
- Born: September 1, 1946 (age 80); Cameron, Texas, U.S.
- Listed height: 6 ft 1 in (1.85 m)
- Listed weight: 229 lb (104 kg)

Career information
- High school: Richfield (Waco, Texas)
- College: SMU
- NFL draft: 1968: 11th round, 291st overall pick

Career history
- San Diego Chargers (1968-1975)

Awards and highlights
- First-team All-AFL (1969)

Career NFL/AFL statistics
- Field goals: 121-71
- Extra points: 175-167
- Punts: 519
- Punting yards: 21,417
- Longest punt: 73
- Stats at Pro Football Reference

Dennis Franklin Partee (born September 2, 1946) is an American former professional football player who was a kicker and punter for the San Diego Chargers of the American Football League (AFL) and later in the National Football League (NFL). He played college football for the SMU Mustangs. In 1975, he co-founded the coin-operated video game manufacturer Cinematronics with teammate Gary Garrison.
