= Waverly Community Schools =

School system in Michigan, United States

Address
- 515 Snow Rd Lansing, Eaton, Michigan, 48917; United States
- Coordinates: 42°43′41″N 84°37′16″W

District information
- Grades: PreK-12
- Superintendent: Kelly Blake
- Schools: 6
- Budget: US$63,172,000 (2022-2023 expenditures)
- NCES District ID: 2635520

Students and staff
- Students: 2,854 (2024-25)
- Teachers: 175.05 FTE (2024-25)
- Staff: 424.85 FTE (2024-25)
- Student–teacher ratio: 16.3 (2024-2025)

Other information
- Website: www.waverlycommunityschools.net

Waverly Community Schools is a public school district in Eaton County and Ingham County near Lansing, Michigan. It serves the community of Edgemont Park, Lansing Township, Waverly in part of Delta Township, and part of Windsor Township.

Waverly Community Schools was formed in 1961 with the consolidation of the Stoner, Millett, Bretton Woods, and Windemere Schools.

== History prior to consolidation ==
Prior to the formation of Waverly Community Schools, school districts within the present Waverly district boundaries, such as Bretton Woods district, paid tuition to Lansing School District for junior and senior high school students.

== History 1960 to present ==
=== Founding ===
In 1958, the Delta-Waverly area would oppose to the annexation with the Lansing School District due to a landslide vote.

=== 1960s ===
The Waverly Community School District would be established thereafter in 1960 due to a public vote. The school district included 4 schools which were: Stoner, Bretton Woods, Windemere View, and Windemere Park. Together, their first year enrollment was 2,199 students. Waverly East would be opened in 1961 for 7th graders, 8th graders, and Juniors. 9th grade would be added later to Waverly East in 1962, and a new elementary school called Meryl S. Colt Elementary would open. A year later in 1963, Waverly Senior High School would be founded alongside the Waverly Maintenance and Transportation building. The newly created high school would open up for Sophomores and Juniors. District enrollment would reach its peak four years later in 1967, with about 4,400 students enrolling. Elmwood and Winans Elementary would open later that year. In 1968, Waverly West (now called Waverly Middle School) is now opened as the second junior high school.

=== 1970s ===
The Administrative Center would open on Snow Rd. in 1975.

=== 1980s ===
Windemere Park Elementary would close in 1980. The district would also be renamed four years later in 1984 to Waverly Community Schools. Waverly West would be renamed a year later in 1985 to Waverly Middle School. In 1987, Waverly Community Schools would close Waverly East's school building to be used as a community services building instead. Two years later in 1989, Waverly Community Schools would reopen Waverly East again, serving students from the 5th to 6th grade.

=== 2000s ===
A $49 Million bond was approved in order to improve all school facilities in the district.

=== 2010s ===
Waverly Community Schools would close Windemere View Elementary in 2011. Two years later in 2013, voters in the school district would pass the Waverly Technology Bond. Which was an $18.4 Million bond that focused on improving technology within the school district via renovating media center spaces, and installing new security technology in an effort to modernize the school facilities within the district. In 2016, voters would approve for a sinking fund millage to maintain all school facilities.

== Schools ==
List of Schools in Waverly Community Schools district
School	Address	Notes
Colt Early Childhood Center	4344 W. Michigan Ave., Lansing	Grades PreK-K. Opened 1962.
East Intermediate School	3131 W. Michigan Ave., Lansing	Grades 5-6. Opened 1961.
Elmwood Elementary School	1533 Elmwood Rd., Lansing	Grades 1-4. Opened 1967.
Winans Elementary School	5401 W. Michigan Ave., Lansing	Grades 1-4. Opened 1967.
Waverly Middle School	620 Snow Rd., Lansing	Grades 7-8. Opened 1968.
Waverly High School	160 Snow Rd., Lansing	Grades 9-12. Opened 1963.

=== Former schools ===
- Grove School, built 1954, closed 1968
- Windemere View Elementary, closed 2011
- Windemere Park Elementary, closed 1980
- Stoner Elementary, closed 1973. Renovated into a General Motors human resources center in 1985.
- Snow Road Elementary, closed 1966.
- Bretton Woods Elementary, closed 1967. Housed the Delta Township library between 1975 and 2008.

== Notable alumni ==
- Muhsin Muhammad
- John Smoltz
- Marcus Taylor
