= Mr. Basketball of Michigan =

Honor awarded to high school basketball players

Each year the Hal Schram Mr. Basketball award is given to the person chosen as the best high school senior boys basketball player in the U.S. state of Michigan. The award is named in honor of the late Hal Schram, a sports writer at the Detroit Free Press who covered high school sports for 40 years before retiring in 1983.

The award has been given since 1981 by the Basketball Coaches Association of Michigan (BCAM). Most of the award winners have gone on to play at the highest levels of college basketball, and many have gone on to play in the National Basketball Association.

Voting is done on a points system. Each voter selects first, second, and third-place votes. A player receives five points for each first-place vote, three points for each second-place vote, and one point for a third-place vote. The player who receives the most points receives the award. Only "actively coaching" BCAM members can vote. Beginning for the 2007 award, votes may only be cast for a predetermined group of five finalists, whereas in the past, the pool was unlimited.

== Mr. Basketball winners ==
Year	Winner	High school	University	NBA Draft
2026	KJ Torbert	East Lansing High School	Bowling Green	
2025	Trey McKenney	St. Mary's Preparatory	Michigan	
2024	Phat Phat Brooks	Grand Rapids Catholic Central High School	Michigan / Central Michigan	
2023	Tyler Jamison	Port Huron Northern High School	Fairleigh Dickinson / Lake Superior State	
2022	Chansey Willis Jr.	Detroit King High School	SVSU / Henry Ford / Western Michigan / Minnesota / Kent State	
2021	Pierre Brooks II	Detroit Douglass Academy	Michigan State / Butler	
2020	Scooby Johnson	Benton Harbor High School	Butler	
2019	Romeo Weems	New Haven High School	DePaul	
2018	Foster Loyer	Clarkston High School	Michigan State / Davidson	
2017	Isaiah Livers	Kalamazoo Central High School	Michigan	2021 NBA draft: 2nd round, 42nd overall by the Charlotte Hornets, subsequently traded to the Detroit Pistons via the New York Knicks
2016	Cassius Winston	University of Detroit Jesuit High School	Michigan State	2020 NBA draft: 2nd round, 53rd overall by the Oklahoma City Thunder, subsequently traded to the Washington Wizards
2015	Deyonta Davis	Muskegon High School	Michigan State	2016 NBA draft: 2nd round, 31st overall by the Boston Celtics
2014	Deshaun Thrower	Muskegon High School	Stony Brook / Ferris State	
2013	Monté Morris	Flint Beecher High School	Iowa State	2017 NBA draft: 2nd round, 51st overall by the Denver Nuggets
2012	Matt Costello	Bay City Western High School	Michigan State	
2011	Dwaun Anderson	Suttons Bay High School	Wagner	
2010	Keith Appling	Detroit Pershing High School	Michigan State	
2009	Derrick Nix	Detroit Pershing High School	Michigan State	
2008	Brad Redford	Frankenmuth High School	Xavier	
2007	Manny Harris	Detroit Redford	Michigan	
2006	David Kool	Grand Rapids South Christian High School	Western Michigan	
2005	Wilson Chandler	Benton Harbor High School	DePaul	2007 NBA draft: 1st Rnd, 23rd overall by the New York Knicks
2004	Drew Neitzel	Wyoming Park High School	Michigan State	
2003	Dion Harris	Detroit Redford	Michigan	
2002	Paul Davis	Rochester High School	Michigan State	2006 NBA draft: 2nd Rnd, 34th overall by the Los Angeles Clippers
2001	Kelvin Torbert	Flint Northwestern High School	Michigan State	
2000	Marcus Taylor	Lansing Waverly High School	Michigan State	2002 NBA draft: 2nd Rnd, 52nd overall by the Minnesota Timberwolves
1999	Jason Richardson	Arthur Hill High School	Michigan State	2001 NBA draft: 1st Rnd, 5th overall by the Golden State Warriors
1998	Dane Fife	Clarkston High School	Indiana	
1997	Shane Battier	Detroit Country Day School	Duke	2001 NBA draft: 1st Rnd, 6th overall by the Memphis Grizzlies
1996	Winfred Walton	Detroit Pershing High School	Fresno State	
1995	Robert Traylor	Detroit Murray-Wright High School	Michigan	1998 NBA draft: 1st Rnd, 6th overall by the Dallas Mavericks
1994	Willie Mitchell	Detroit Pershing High School	Michigan, UAB	
1993	Jon Garavaglia	Southgate Aquinas High School	Michigan State	
1992	Kenyon Murray	Battle Creek Central High School	Iowa	
1991	Chris Webber	Detroit Country Day School	Michigan	1993 NBA draft: 1st Rnd, 1st overall by the Orlando Magic
1990	Anthony Miller	Benton Harbor High School	Michigan State	1994 NBA draft: 2nd Rnd, 39th overall by the Golden State Warriors
1989	Michael Talley	Detroit Cooley High School	Michigan	
1988	Matt Steigenga	Grand Rapids South Christian High School	Michigan State	1992 NBA draft: 2nd Rnd, 52nd overall by the Chicago Bulls
1987	Mark Macon	Saginaw Buena Vista High School	Temple	1991 NBA draft: 1st Rnd, 8th overall by the Denver Nuggets
1986	Terry Mills	Romulus High School	Michigan	1990 NBA draft: 1st Rnd, 16th overall by the Milwaukee Bucks
1985	Glen Rice	Flint Northwestern High School	Michigan	1989 NBA draft: 1st Rnd, 4th overall by the Miami Heat
1984	Demetreus Gore	Detroit Chadsey High School	Pittsburgh	
1983	Antoine Joubert	Detroit Southwestern High School	Michigan	1987 NBA draft: 6th Rnd, 134th overall by the Detroit Pistons
1982	Robert Henderson	Lansing Eastern High School	Michigan	1986 NBA draft: 7th Rnd, 143rd overall by the Chicago Bulls
1981	Sam Vincent	Lansing Eastern High School	Michigan State	1985 NBA draft: 1st Rnd, 20th overall by the Boston Celtics

== Retro Mr. Basketball winners ==
In 2010, the BCAM began a 10-year project to honor 'high school senior' boys basketball players from the period prior to the inception of the Mr. Basketball award. The initial awards were announced for players for the years ending in xxx0 - 1920, 1930, 1940, 1950, 1960, 1970 and 1980. In 2011, awards for next six corresponding 'seniors' for years ending in xxx1 - 1921, 1931, 1941, 1951, 1961, and 1971 - were named. This pattern continued through the year 2019 when the final award winners were selected for the seasons ending in xxx9.

Year	Winner	High school	University
1980	Tim McCormick	Clarkston	Michigan
1979	Jay Smith	Mio AuSable High School	Bowling Green, Saginaw Valley State
1978	Trent Tucker	Flint Northwestern	Minnesota
1977	Earvin "Magic" Johnson	Lansing Everett	Michigan State
1976	Stuart House	Detroit Denby	Washington State
1975	Bruce Flowers	Berkley	Notre Dame
1974	Tony Smith	Saginaw	Nevada-Las Vegas
1973	Tom LaGarde	Detroit Catholic Central	North Carolina
1972	Larry Fogle	Detroit Cooley	Canisius
1971	Michael "Campy" Russell	Pontiac Central	Michigan
1970	Rick Drewitz	Garden City West	Kentucky
1969	Ernie Johnson	Grand Rapids Ottawa Hills	Michigan
1968	Ralph Simpson	Detroit Pershing	Michigan State
1967	Spencer Haywood	Detroit Pershing	University of Detroit
1966	Rudy Tomjanovich	Hamtramck	Michigan
1965	L. C. Bowen	Benton Harbor	Bradley
1964	Willie Betts	River Rouge	Bradley
1963	Craig Dill	Saginaw Arthur Hill	Michigan
1962	Ernie Thompson	Saginaw	Bradley
1961	Reggie Harding	Detroit Eastern	None
1960	Peter Gent	Bangor	Michigan State
1959	David Gaines	Detroit Northeastern	LeMoyne–Owen College
1958	Chet Walker	Benton Harbor High School	Bradley
1957	Ed Burton	Muskegon Heights	Michigan State
1956	Mel Peterson	Stephenson	Wheaton
1955	M. C. Burton Jr.	Muskegon Heights	Michigan
1954	Pete Tillotson	Ludington	Michigan
1953	Ron Kramer	East Detroit	Michigan
1952	Frank Tanana	Detroit St. Andrew	Cal State-Fullerton (baseball)
1951	Webster Kirksey	Saginaw	Eastern Michigan
1950	Charlie Primas	Detroit Miller	Wayne State
1949	Ken Burrell	Hamtramck	Lawrence Tech
1948	Art McColgan	Saginaw SS Peter & Paul	Villanova
1947	Sammy Gee	Detroit Miller	
1946	Jack Forestieri	Benton Harbor	Notre Dame
1945	Bob Swanson	Lansing Sexton	
1944	Dick Rifenburg	Saginaw Arthur Hill	Michigan
1943	Don Boven	Kalamazoo Central	Western Michigan
1942	Larry Savage	Saginaw	Northwestern
1941	Don Osterman	Detroit St. Theresa	Villanova
1940	Ralph Gibert	Flint Northern	Michigan
1939	Gene Broene	Grand Rapids Christian	Calvin College
1938	John Maartens	Kalamazoo Central	
1937	Bob Osterman	Detroit St. Theresa	Notre Dame
1936	Charles Pink	Detroit Northwestern	Michigan
1935	John Zwier	Holland Christian	
1934	Earl Brown Jr.	Benton Harbor	Notre Dame
1933	Lincoln Dodson Truss	Flint Northern	
1932	Lowell Matteson	Portage	
1931	Edward Huttenga	Grand Haven	Western Michigan
1930	John Tooker	Kalamazoo St. Augustine	Michigan
1929	Lou Jagnow	Jackson	Carnegie Mellon University
1928	Francis 'Dink' Doolittle	Detroit Northwestern	
1927	Bill McCall	Muskegon	Dartmouth
1926	Roger Grove	Sturgis	Michigan State
1925	Joe Truskowski	Detroit Northeastern	Michigan
1924	Bennie Oosterbaan	Muskegon	Michigan
1923	Henry Schrumpf	Niles	Western Michigan
1922	Royal Cherry	Grand Rapids Union	Michigan
1921	George Haggarty	Ypsilanti	Michigan
1920	Harry Kipke	Lansing Central	Michigan

== Most winners by high school (1920-Present) ==
Number	High school
7	Benton Harbor High School
6	Detroit Pershing High School
4	Muskegon High School
4	Saginaw High School
3	Clarkston High School
3	Flint Northwestern High School
3	Kalamazoo High School
3	Saginaw Arthur Hill High School

== See also ==
- Michigan Miss Basketball
