= 2000 McDonald's All-American Boys Game =

American high school basketball game

West	East
146	120
	1st half	2nd half	Total
West	74	72	146
East	63	57	120
- Date: March 29, 2000
- Venue: FleetCenter, Boston, MA
- MVP: Zach Randolph
- Referees: 1; 2; 3
- Attendance: 18,624
- Network: ESPN

McDonald's All-American

The 2000 McDonald's All-American Boys Game was an All-star basketball game played on Wednesday, March 29, 2000 at the FleetCenter in Boston, Massachusetts. The game's rosters featured the best and most highly recruited high school boys graduating in 2000. The game was the 23rd annual version of the McDonald's All-American Game first played in 1978.

== 2000 game ==
The game was telecast live by ESPN. The venue was the FleetCenter, home of the Boston Celtics of the NBA. The game was characterized by the high efficiency of the West players: the team took advantage of the bigger players in the roster and scored many points in the paint. Center Zach Randolph was the MVP of the game with 23 points and 15 rebounds. Other players who starred were DeShawn Stevenson, the game top scorer with 25 points; Darius Miles with his 17 points; Andre Brown, another player who recorded a double-double with 20 points and 14 rebounds, like Gerald Wallace (15 pts/10 rebs); Andre Barrett, the agile 5-9 point guard, recorded 12 assists, the second best performance in the event history. Of the 24 players, 13 went on to play at least 1 game in the NBA. Following their good performance in the All-American game both Miles and Stevenson decided to forgo college and declared for the 2000 NBA draft: Miles was the 3rd overall pick and Stevenson the 23rd.

=== East roster ===
No.	Name	Height	Weight	Position	Hometown	High school	College of Choice
10	Omar Cook	6-1	190	G	Middle Village, NY, U.S.	Christ the King	St. John's
11	Taliek Brown	6-1	185	G	Queens, New York, U.S.	St. John's Preparatory School	Connecticut
12	Andre Barrett	5-9	165	G	Manhattan, NY, U.S.	Rice	Seton Hall
20	Darius Rice	6-10	200	F	Jackson, MS, U.S.	Lanier	Undecided
21	Scott Hazelton	6-7	205	F	Lawrence, MA, U.S.	Central Catholic	Connecticut
22	Jerome Harper	6-5	190	G	Columbia, SC, U.S.	W. J. Keenan	Iowa State (Did not attend)
24	Scooter Sherrill	6-3	180	G	Mount Ulla, NC, U.S.	West Rowan	NC State
33	Eddie Griffin	6-9	205	F	Philadelphia, PA, U.S.	Roman Catholic	Seton Hall
34	Mario Austin	6-8	255	C	York, AL, U.S.	Sumter County	Mississippi State
42	Neil Fingleton	7-6	310	C	Worcester, MA, U.S.	Holy Name Central Catholic	North Carolina
45	Gerald Wallace	6-7	210	F	Childersburg, AL, U.S.	Childersburg	Alabama
55	Rolando Howell	6-9	220	C	Hopkins, SC, U.S.	Lower Richland	South Carolina

=== West roster ===
No.	Name	Height	Weight	Position	Hometown	High school	College of Choice
0	DeShawn Stevenson	6-5	210	G	Fresno, CA, U.S.	Washington Union	Kansas (Did not attend)
13	Luke Ridnour	6-2	175	G	Blaine, WA, U.S.	Blaine	Oregon
21	Darius Miles	6-8	212	G	East St. Louis, IL, U.S.	East St. Louis	St. John's (Did not attend)
25	Chris Duhon	6-1	185	G	Slidell, Louisiana, U.S.	Salmen	Duke
32	Marcus Taylor	6-4	200	G	Lansing, MI, U.S.	Waverly	Michigan State
33	Brian Boddicker	6-9	230	C	Duncanville, TX, U.S.	Duncanville	Texas
34	Alton Ford	6-10	265	C	Houston, TX, U.S.	Milby	Houston
35	Jared Jeffries	6-10	215	F	Bloomington, IN, U.S.	North	Indiana
41	Garner Meads	6-8	215	F	Salt Lake City, UT, U.S.	Brighton	Undecided
44	Andre Brown	6-9	185	F	Chicago, IL, U.S.	Leo	DePaul
45	Travon Bryant	6-7	235	F	Long Beach, CA, U.S.	Jordan	Undecided
50	Zach Randolph	6-9	270	C	Marion, IN, U.S.	Marion	Michigan State

=== Coaches ===
The East team was coached by:

- Head Coach William Loughnane of South Boston High School (Boston, Massachusetts)
- Asst Coach Mike Rubin of East Boston High School (Boston, Massachusetts)

The West team was coached by:

- Head Coach Rick Sherley of Alief Hastings High School (Alief, Texas)
- Asst Coach Mike Smallwood of Alief Hastings High School (Alief, Texas)

== All-American Week ==
=== Contest winners ===
- The 2000 Slam Dunk contest was won by DeShawn Stevenson.
- The 2000 3-point shoot-out was won by Chris Duhon.
