= Jeff Kaiser =

American baseball player (born 1960)

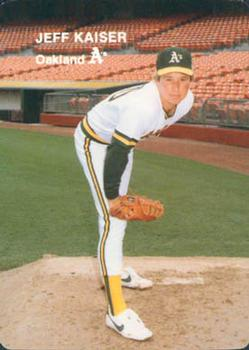
- Kaiser with the Oakland Athletics c. 1985
- Pitcher
- Born: July 24, 1960 (age 66); Wyandotte, Michigan, U.S.
- Batted: Right Threw: Left

MLB debut
- April 11, 1985, for the Oakland Athletics

Last MLB appearance
- May 17, 1993, for the New York Mets

MLB statistics
- Win–loss record: 0–2
- Earned run average: 9.17
- Strikeouts: 38
- Stats at Baseball Reference

Teams
- Oakland Athletics (1985); Cleveland Indians (1987–1990); Detroit Tigers (1991); Cincinnati Reds (1993); New York Mets (1993)

Jeffrey Patrick Kaiser (born July 24, 1960) is an American former Major League Baseball pitcher. Kaiser attended Aquinas High School in Southgate, Michigan where he was teammates with Paul Assenmacher. He played college baseball at Western Michigan University, winning a school record 25 games. He pitched parts of seven seasons in the majors for five teams between 1985 and 1993. He never pitched more than 15 games or 16.2 innings in a major league season. He finished his career with an ERA of 9.17 in 50 games.

== Sources ==
- Career statistics from Baseball Reference · Baseball Reference (Minors) · Retrosheet · Baseball Almanac
