= Edgemont Park, Michigan =

- Census-designated place (CDP) & unincorporated community
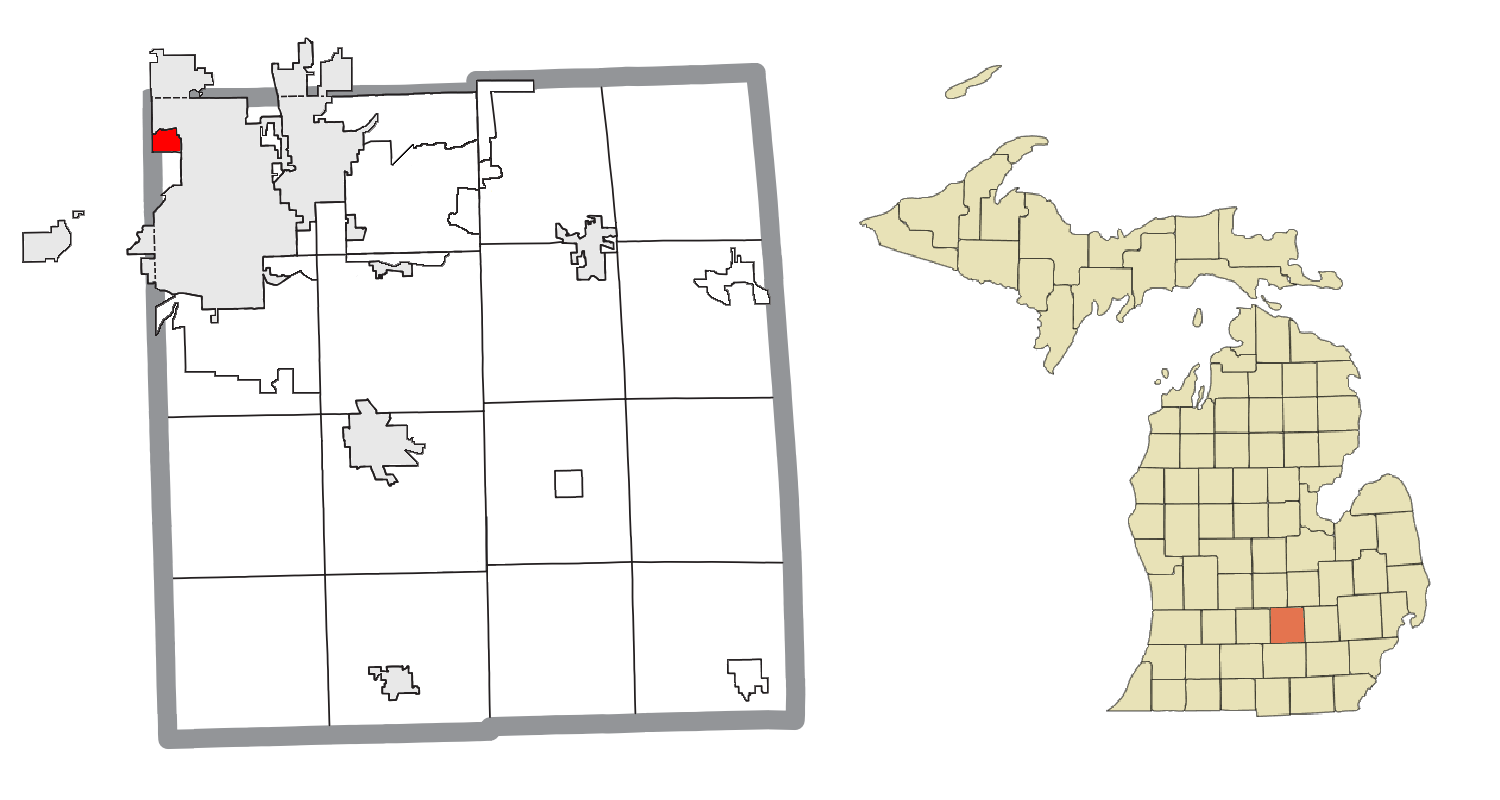
- Location within Ingham County

- Location within the state of Michigan Edgemont Park (the United States)
- Coordinates: 42°44′48″N 84°35′34″W
- Country: United States
- State: Michigan
- County: Ingham
- Township: Lansing

Area
  - Total: 0.83 sq mi (2.15 km^{2})
  - Land: 0.83 sq mi (2.15 km^{2})
  - Water: 0 sq mi (0.00 km^{2})
- Elevation: 876 ft (267 m)

Population (2020)
  - Total: 2,326
  - Density: 2,799.4/sq mi (1,080.85/km^{2})
- Time zone: UTC-5 (Eastern (EST))
  - Summer (DST): UTC-4 (EDT)
- ZIP code(s): 48917 (Lansing)
- Area code: 517
- FIPS code: 26-24880
- GNIS feature ID: 2392987

Edgemont Park is a census-designated place (CDP) in Ingham County in the U.S. state of Michigan. It is located within Lansing Charter Township. The population was 2,326 at the 2020 census.

== Geography ==
The community is bordered to the east and the north by the city of Lansing, to the south by Saginaw Street (M-43), and to the west by the community of Waverly in Eaton County. Part of the northern border of Edgemont Park follows the Grand River.

According to the United States Census Bureau, the CDP has a total area of 0.83 square miles (2.15 km^{2}), all land.

== Demographics ==
Historical population
Census	Pop.	Note	%±
2000	2,442		—
2010	2,358		−3.4%
2020	2,326		−1.4%
U.S. Decennial Census

=== 2020 census ===
As of the 2020 census, Edgemont Park had a population of 2,326. The median age was 39.1 years. 21.8% of residents were under the age of 18 and 17.2% of residents were 65 years of age or older. For every 100 females there were 88.5 males, and for every 100 females age 18 and over there were 85.0 males age 18 and over.

100.0% of residents lived in urban areas, while 0.0% lived in rural areas.

There were 1,063 households in Edgemont Park, of which 25.9% had children under the age of 18 living in them. Of all households, 35.6% were married-couple households, 20.3% were households with a male householder and no spouse or partner present, and 35.7% were households with a female householder and no spouse or partner present. About 37.2% of all households were made up of individuals and 15.7% had someone living alone who was 65 years of age or older.

There were 1,127 housing units, of which 5.7% were vacant. The homeowner vacancy rate was 1.0% and the rental vacancy rate was 13.1%.

Racial composition as of the 2020 census
Race	Number	Percent
White	1,595	68.6%
Black or African American	334	14.4%
American Indian and Alaska Native	5	0.2%
Asian	34	1.5%
Native Hawaiian and Other Pacific Islander	0	0.0%
Some other race	64	2.8%
Two or more races	294	12.6%
Hispanic or Latino (of any race)	287	12.3%

=== 2000 census ===
As of the census of 2000, there were 2,442 people, 1,081 households, and 700 families residing in the CDP. The population density was 2,881.1 inhabitants per square mile (1,112.4/km^{2}). There were 1,114 housing units at an average density of 1,314.3 per square mile (507.5/km^{2}). The racial makeup of the CDP was 85.09% White, 7.53% Black or African American, 0.49% Native American, 0.86% Asian, 0.04% Pacific Islander, 2.95% from other races, and 3.03% from two or more races. Hispanic or Latino of any race were 6.72% of the population.

There were 1,081 households, out of which 29.6% had children under the age of 18 living with them, 48.0% were married couples living together, 13.9% had a female householder with no husband present, and 35.2% were non-families. 30.2% of all households were made up of individuals, and 10.9% had someone living alone who was 65 years of age or older. The average household size was 2.23 and the average family size was 2.76.

In the CDP, the population was spread out, with 24.3% under the age of 18, 7.9% from 18 to 24, 28.7% from 25 to 44, 20.8% from 45 to 64, and 18.3% who were 65 years of age or older. The median age was 37 years. For every 100 females, there were 86.3 males. For every 100 females age 18 and over, there were 80.7 males.

The median income for a household in the CDP was $43,173, and the median income for a family was $54,566. Males had a median income of $39,474 versus $28,750 for females. The per capita income for the CDP was $23,981. About 4.9% of families and 5.5% of the population were below the poverty line, including 7.0% of those under age 18 and 4.2% of those age 65 or over.
