= Jon Garavaglia =

American basketball player

Personal information
- Born: April 8, 1974 (age 52) Dearborn, Michigan, U.S.
- Listed height: 6 ft 9 in (2.06 m)
- Listed weight: 230 lb (104 kg)

Career information
- High school: Aquinas (Southgate, Michigan)
- College: Michigan State (1993–1997)
- NBA draft: 1997: undrafted
- Playing career: 1997–2004
- Position: Power forward / center

Career history
- 1997–1999: Oliveirense
- 1999: Grand Rapids Hoops
- 1999–2000: Cholet Basket
- 2000: León Caja España
- 2000–2001: Adecco Milano
- 2001–2002: Dafnis
- 2002: STB Le Havre
- 2002–2003: SIG Strasbourg
- 2003: Rockford Lightning
- 2003–2004: Benfica

Career highlights
- Mr. Basketball of Michigan (1993); McDonald's All-American (1993)

Jonathan David Garavaglia (born April 8, 1974) is an American former professional basketball player. A strong player who could be used both as a power forward and a center, he was one of the top ranked recruits of the high school class of 1993. After a 4-year college career at Michigan State, he went undrafted in the 1997 NBA draft and played professionally for 7 years, mostly in Europe.

== High school career ==
Garavaglia was born in Dearborn, Michigan and attended Aquinas High School in the Detroit suburb of Southgate. He started playing varsity basketball in his sophomore year at Aquinas, wearing jersey number 54 and immediately showed good performances, averaging 19.8 points per game in his first season of high school basketball. In his junior year he averaged 19.2 points.

Garavaglia's senior year saw all-around success for him and his team. He was the team captain and averaged 16 points, 14 rebounds and 5 assists: his personal scoring numbers decreased because he focused more on team play, involving his teammates and becoming less of a selfish player. He ended the season a Catholic League and Class C champion, and was ranked among the top high school players in the nation. He was named Michigan Gatorade Player of the Year, Mr. Basketball of Michigan with 426 votes and ended his career at Aquinas with 1,358 points, a school record. He also earned a selection in the McDonald's All-American team: in the 1993 McDonald's All-American Boys Game he scored 2 points, going 1/2 from the field and 0/2 from the free throw line.

== College career ==
During his high school career Garavaglia was recruited by many Division I college programs, including Arizona State, UNLV and Virginia, but he ultimately restricted his choice between Michigan and Michigan State; he finally chose the latter, feeling that he would have more chances finding playing time in a roster that in his opinion was less talented overall (the Michigan Wolverines were in the Fab Five years). He chose to wear jersey number 21. Garavaglia's freshman season saw him play only 11.3 minutes per game, but he appeared in all 32 games played by the Spartans, averaging 2.7 points, 2.0 rebounds and 0.5 assists while shooting 51% from the field.

In his sophomore season with the Spartans coach Jud Heathcote promoted Garavaglia to a starter role, and he gained more playing time. He started 23 of the 28 games he played, scoring 7.6 points per game, along with 5.1 rebounds, 0.6 assists and 0.3 blocks in almost 25 minutes per game. He scored a game-winning shot with 7 seconds left on the shot clock on January 25, 1995 against Minnesota. He switched to jersey number 25 in his junior season and in this season he had a career-high 8 offensive rebounds on November 28, 1995 vs. Arkansas. However, Garavaglia's averages declined both in scoring (5.1) and rebounding (4.5), as his minutes dropped to 20.7 per game and he started only 13 games with newly appointed coach Tom Izzo.

His final year of college basketball saw him recording career-best numbers in all major statistical categories, and he averaged 10.4 points, 5.9 rebounds, 1.1 assists and 1.0 steal per game, while shooting 50% from the field. He scored a career high of 20 points on December 3, 1996 in an 83–78 win against Cleveland State. Throughout his college career he showed inconsistent play, and coach Tom Izzo said that he thought Garavaglia could have been a better player had he been more focused, especially during his first years at Michigan State. Garavaglia ended his college career with 120 games played with career averages of 6.3 points, 4.3 rebounds and 0.8 assists. He scored a total of 761 points for the Spartans.

=== College statistics ===
| Year | Team | GP | GS | MPG | FG% | 3P% | FT% | RPG | APG | SPG | BPG | PPG |
|---|---|---|---|---|---|---|---|---|---|---|---|---|
| 1993–94 | Michigan State | 32 | | 11.3 | .512 | .000 | .167 | 2.0 | 0.5 | 0.2 | 0.0 | 2.7 |
| 1994–95 | Michigan State | 28 | 23 | 24.8 | .484 | .323 | .595 | 5.1 | 0.6 | 0.4 | 0.3 | 7.6 |
| 1995–96 | Michigan State | 31 | 13 | 20.7 | .354 | .281 | .765 | 4.5 | 1.1 | 0.4 | 0.3 | 5.1 |
| 1996–97 | Michigan State | 29 | | | .500 | .375 | .684 | 5.9 | 1.1 | 1.0 | 0.2 | 10.4 |
| Career | | 120 | | | .460 | .301 | .660 | 4.3 | 0.8 | 0.5 | 0.2 | 6.3 |

== Professional career ==
After his senior year of college basketball Garavaglia was automatically eligible for the 1997 NBA draft, but he was not selected. He then transferred to Portugal, signing for Oliveirense, in the Liga Portuguesa de Basquetebol, the first level of Portuguese basketball. With Oliveirense he also appeared in the 1997–98 FIBA EuroCup. After two seasons with Oliveirense he was cut in January 1999 and joined the Grand Rapids Hoops in the Continental Basketball Association: he played 27 regular season games, averaging 8.4 points, 6.4 rebounds and 1.1 assists in 22.9 minutes per game; in postseason play he averaged 4.1 points and 3.6 rebounds in 13.0 minutes per game.

In 1999 he transferred to French club Cholet Basket, and in 12 LNB Pro A games he recorded averages of 9.9 points and 5.3 rebounds in 25.9 minutes per game. He then joined Spanish club León Caja España in March 2000, replacing Saša Radunović, and he briefly played in the Spanish Liga ACB, starting all of his 6 games and averaged 6.7 points, 4.7 rebounds and 0.8 assists in 30 minutes per game. After Spain he moved to another European top-level championship, the Italian Serie A, joining Adecco Milano. In 31 games he averaged 3.9 points, 2.9 rebounds, 0.3 assists and 0.1 blocks while playing 14.3 minutes per game; he had a season high of 15 points on November 19, 2000 against Snaidero Udine.

He then transferred to Dafni, a Greek club based in Dafni, Athens, and played in the 2001–02 Greek Basket League season. After 4 games he was cut and in February 2002 he joined STB Le Havre, another French team. In 14 games he averaged 11.0 points and 5.5 rebounds in 25.1 minutes. He stayed in France also for the following season, in which he played for SIG Strasbourg: in 27 games he recorded 5.7 points and 3.2 rebounds in 18.8 minutes.

After a brief stint at Rockford Lightning in the CBA, where he played only 2 games, he ended his career after one season at Benfica, in Portugal.
