= Paul Assenmacher =

American baseball player (born 1960)

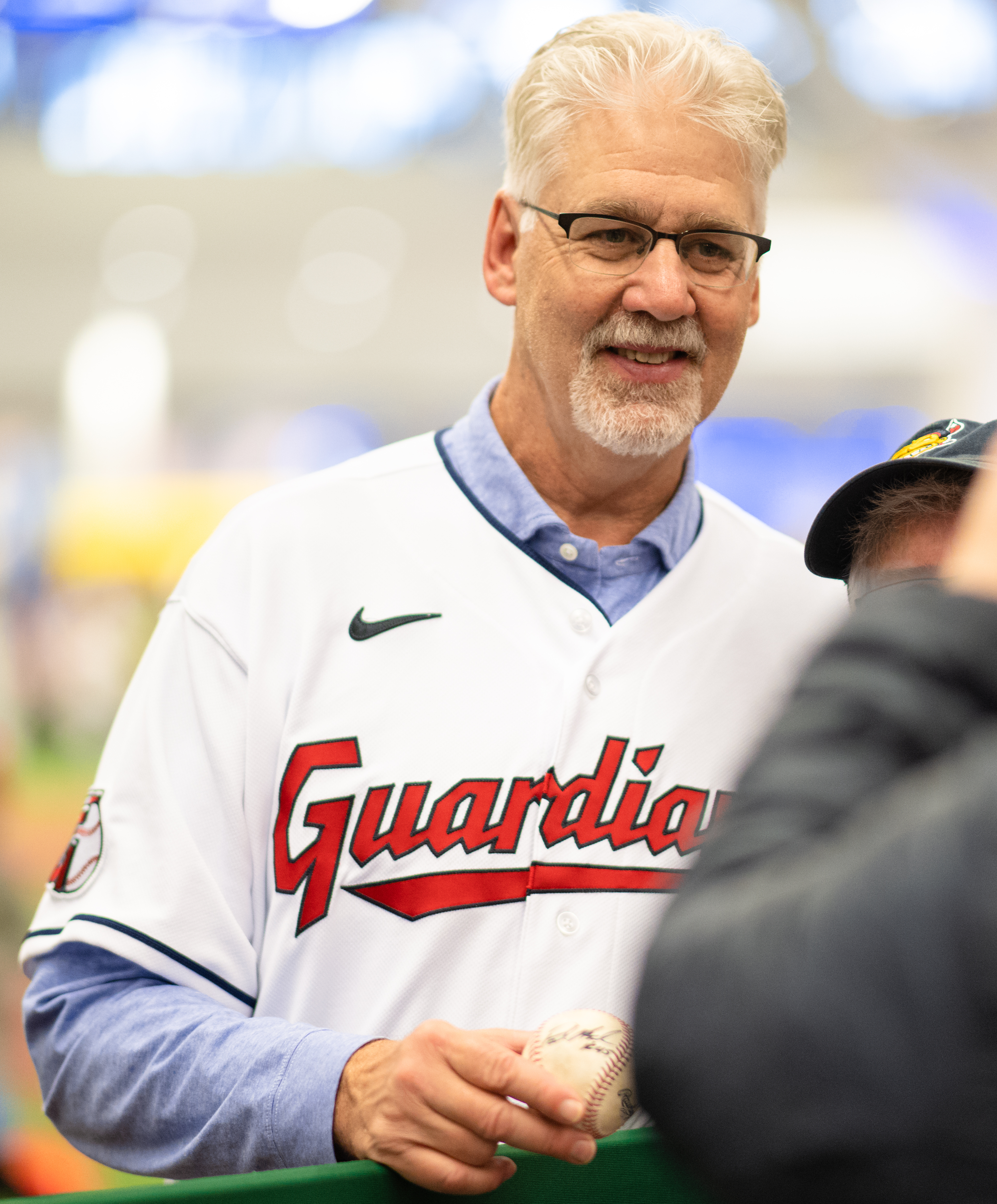
- Assenmacher in 2023
- Pitcher
- Born: December 10, 1960 (age 65); Detroit, Michigan, U.S.
- Batted: Left Threw: Left

MLB debut
- April 12, 1986, for the Atlanta Braves

Last MLB appearance
- October 3, 1999, for the Cleveland Indians

MLB statistics
- Win–loss record: 61–44
- Earned run average: 3.51
- Strikeouts: 807
- Stats at Baseball Reference

Teams
- Atlanta Braves (1986–1989); Chicago Cubs (1989–1993); New York Yankees (1993); Chicago White Sox (1994); Cleveland Indians (1995–1999)

Paul Andre Assenmacher (/ˈɑːsənmɑːkər/ AHSS-ən-mah-kər; born December 10, 1960) is an American former left-handed relief pitcher in Major League Baseball who played for fourteen seasons. Assenmacher pitched for the Atlanta Braves (1986–1989), Chicago Cubs (1989–1993), New York Yankees (1993), Chicago White Sox (1994) and the Cleveland Indians (1995–1999).

Assenmacher attended Aquinas High School where he was teammates with Jeff Kaiser. He played college baseball at Aquinas College in Grand Rapids, Michigan. He signed as an amateur free agent with the Atlanta Braves in 1983, making his major league debut with them on April 12, 1986.

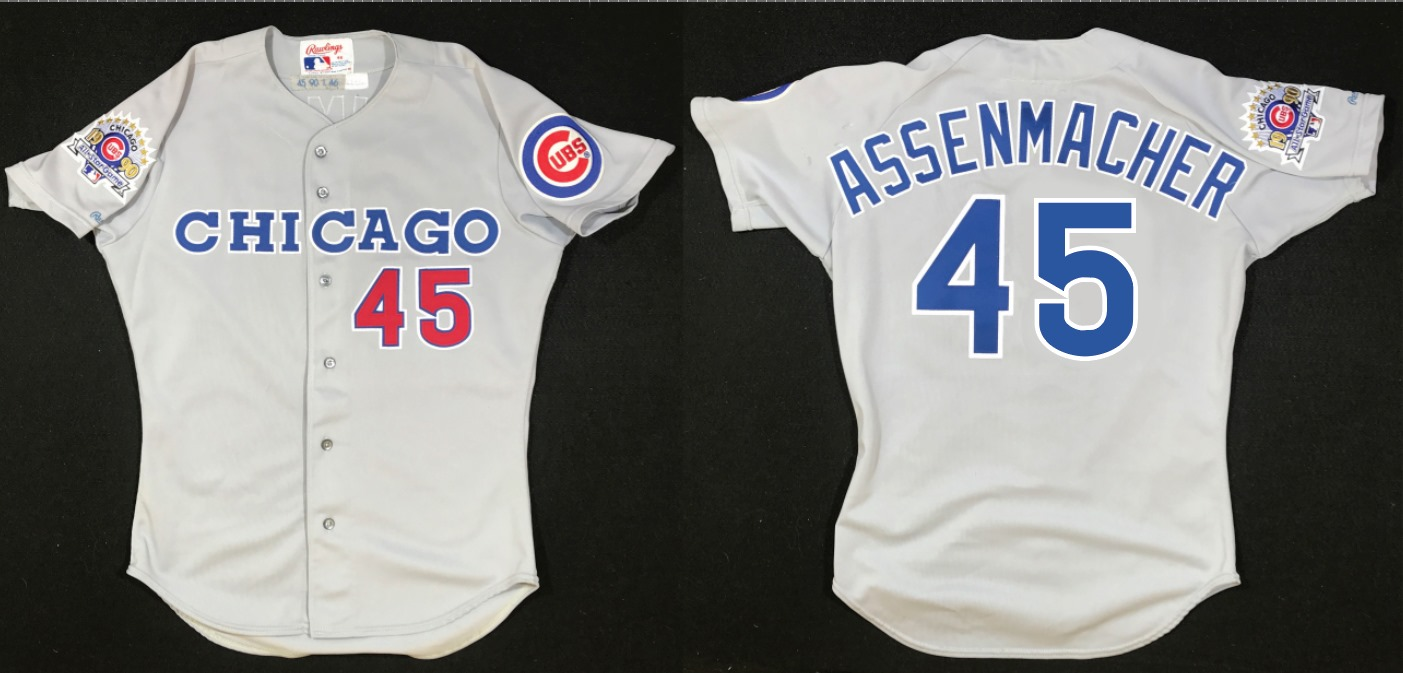
1990 Chicago Cubs #45 Paul Assenmacher game worn road jersey

In his career, Assenmacher compiled a record of 61–44 with a 3.51 ERA, saving 56 games and making one career start in 884 games. He is tied with Mike Jackson for most games pitched in the 1990s (644).

Although only a .083 hitter (3-for-36), Assenmacher was a very good fielding pitcher. He recorded a .986 fielding percentage with only two errors in 146 total chances in 855.2 innings pitched.

Assenmacher has spent nine seasons as the pitching coach for the baseball team at St. Pius X Catholic High School in Atlanta.

== See also ==
- List of Major League Baseball single-inning strikeout leaders
