= Lansing School District =

School district in Michigan

Lansing Public School District

Address
- 519 West Kalamazoo Street Lansing, Ingham County, Michigan, 48933; United States

District information
- Grades: PreKindergarten–12
- Established: 1861
- Superintendent: Jessica Benavides
- Schools: 26
- Budget: $223,084,000 2022–2023 expenditures
- NCES District ID: 2621150

Students and staff
- Students: 9,951 (2024–2025)
- Teachers: 583.86 (on an FTE basis) (2024–2025)
- Staff: 1,848.66 FTE (2024–2025)
- Student–teacher ratio: 17.04 (2024–2025)

Other information
- Website: www.lansingschools.net

The Lansing Public School District is a public school district in Lansing, Michigan. It also serves part of the city of East Lansing, and parts of the townships of Delta, DeWitt, Lansing, and Watertown.

== History ==
Public school in Lansing began in May 1847. Between 1847 and 1851, three separate school districts were created within the three wards of the then-small city. In March 1861 the number of wards was increased to four and the districts were consolidated into a single all-inclusive school district within the city limits as required by the new city charter.

Lansing Central High School's 1942 yearbook discusses the city's first high school: Built in 1875 and rebuilt on the same site in 1910, it became known as Central High School. The next year would be Central's last, as J.W. Sexton High School was dedicated in February 1943, replacing it. Eastern High School opened in 1928 and Everett High School opened in 1933, with its present building opening in fall 1959.

In 1966 the district began a trial basis racial desegregation program. The district began desegregation busing at the elementary level in 1972. The vote to enact the desegregation plan was 5-3.

== Boundary ==
Most of the district is in Ingham County. There, the district includes most of the county's portion of Lansing, as well as portions of East Lansing, Lansing Charter Township, and Delhi Charter Township.

A portion of the district is in Clinton County, where it serves portions of the parts of Lansing and East Lansing in the county, as well as sections of DeWitt Charter Township and Watertown Charter Township.

A portion of the district is in Eaton County, where it serves portions of the parts of Lansing in the county, as well as sections of Delta Charter Township and Windsor Charter Township.

== Schools ==
Schools in Lansing, Michigan
School	Grades	Address	Program/Notes
Attwood New Tech Magnet School	k-8	915 Attwood Dr.	New Tech Magnet
Averill Elementary	PreK-4	3201 Averill Dr.	
Cavanagh STEAM Elementary	PreK-3	300 W Cavanaugh Rd.	
Cumberland Elementary	PreK-5	2801 Cumberland Rd.	
Dwight Rich School of the Arts	K-8	2600 Hampden Dr.	Visual, performing, and communication arts magnet
Eastern High School	9-12	626 Marshall St.	International Baccalaureate & career readiness
Everett High School	9-12	3900 Stabler St.	Built 1959
Forest View Elementary	PreK-4	3119 Stoneleigh	
Gardner International Magnet School	PreK-8	333 Dahlia Dr.	International magnet
Gier Park School	PreK-4	401 E. Gier St.	
J. W. Sexton High School	9-12	102 S. McPherson Ave.	Built 1943
Kendon Elementary School	PreK	827 Kendon Dr.	
Lansing Technical High School	9-12	5815 Wise Rd	Career readiness
Lewton School	PreK-8	2000 Lewton Pl.	Spanish immersion, global studies magnet
Lyons School	PreK-4	2901 Lyons Ave.	
Mt. Hope STEAM School	4-8	4000 Woodcreek Lane	STEAM magnet
North School	K-8	333 E. Miller Rd.	Environmental science magnet
Pattengill Biotechnical Magnet School	PreK-8	815 N Fairview Ave.	Biotechnology magnet
Post Oak Academy	PreK-8	3280 Post Oak Lane	International Baccalaureate, Chinese immersion
Preschool @ Pleasant View	PreK	4501 Pleasant Grove Rd.	
Riddle Elementary	PreK-3	221 Huron St.	Houses Willow Elementary during 2024-2025 school year.
Sheridan Road STEM Magnet School	5-8	16900 N. Cedar St.	STEM magnet
Wexford Montessori Academy	PreK-8	5217 Wexford Rd.	
Willow Elementary	PreK-3		Under construction as of 2024-2025 school year
