= John Smoltz =

American baseball player and sportscaster (born 1967)

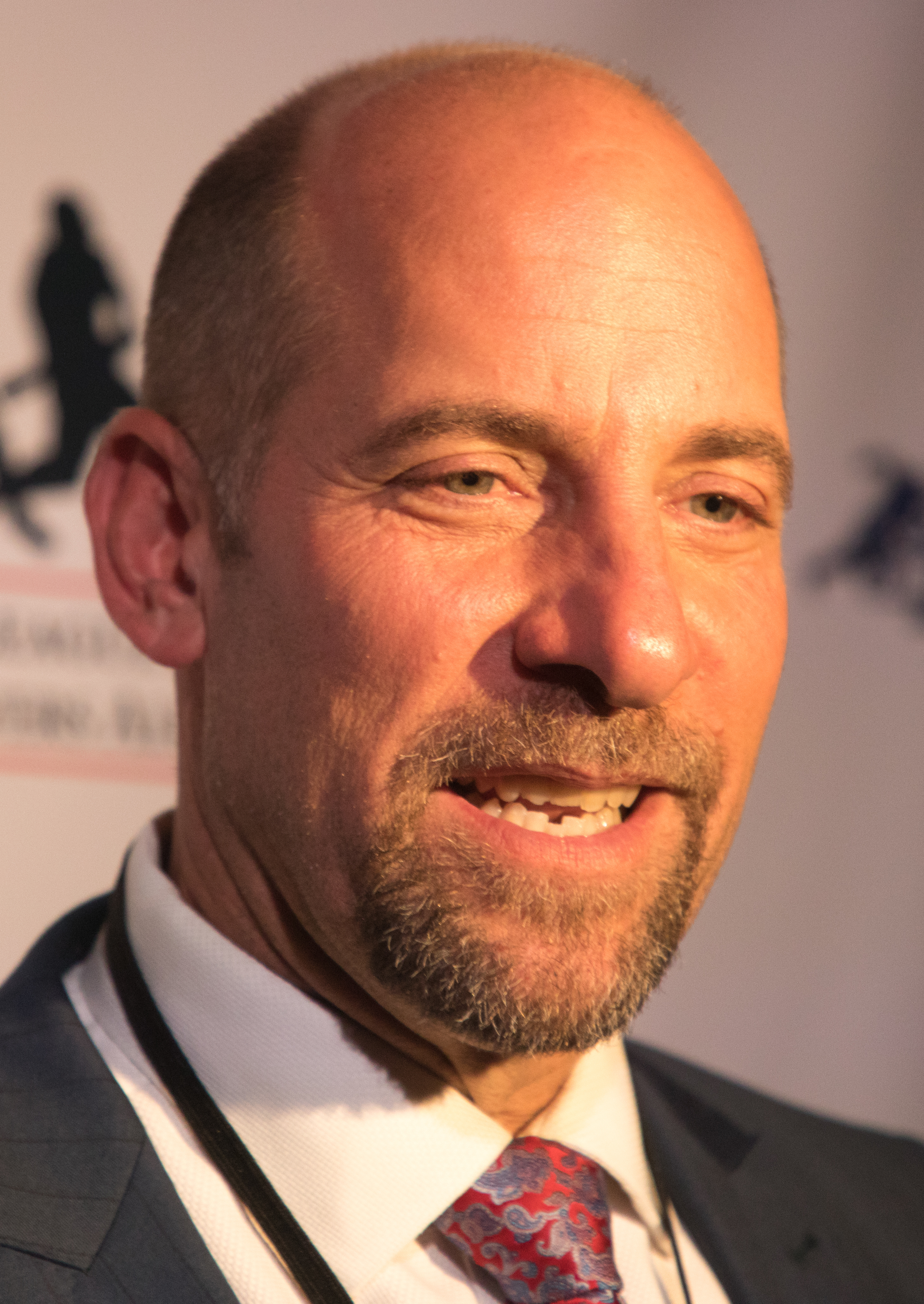
- Smoltz in 2016
- Pitcher
- Born: May 15, 1967 (age 59); Warren, Michigan, U.S.
- Batted: Right Threw: Right

MLB debut
- July 23, 1988, for the Atlanta Braves

Last MLB appearance
- September 30, 2009, for the St. Louis Cardinals

MLB statistics
- Win–loss record: 213–155
- Earned run average: 3.33
- Strikeouts: 3,084
- Saves: 154
- Stats at Baseball Reference

Teams
- Atlanta Braves (1988–1999, 2001–2008); Boston Red Sox (2009); St. Louis Cardinals (2009)

Career highlights and awards
- 8× All-Star (1989, 1992, 1993, 1996, 2002, 2003, 2005, 2007); World Series champion (1995); NL Cy Young Award (1996); NLCS MVP (1992); Silver Slugger Award (1997); NL Rolaids Relief Man Award (2002); Roberto Clemente Award (2005); 2× NL wins leader (1996, 2006); 2× NL strikeout leader (1992, 1996); NL saves leader (2002); Atlanta Braves No. 29 retired; Braves Hall of Fame

Member of the National

Baseball Hall of Fame
- Induction: 2015
- Vote: 82.9% (first ballot)
Medals
Men's baseball
Representing United States
World Junior Baseball Championship
Silver medal – second place	1985 Albany	Team

John Andrew Smoltz (born May 15, 1967), nicknamed "Smoltzie" and "Marmaduke", is an American former professional baseball pitcher who played 21 seasons in Major League Baseball (MLB) from 1988 to 2009, all but the last year with the Atlanta Braves. An eight-time All-Star, Smoltz was part of a celebrated trio of starting pitchers, along with Greg Maddux and Tom Glavine, who propelled Atlanta to perennial pennant contention in the 1990s, highlighted by a championship in the 1995 World Series. He won the National League (NL) Cy Young Award in 1996 after posting a record of 24–8, equaling the most victories by an NL pitcher since 1972. He also played for the Boston Red Sox and St. Louis Cardinals.

Though predominantly known as a starter, Smoltz was converted to a reliever in 2001 after his recovery from Tommy John surgery, and spent four years as the team's closer before returning to a starting role. In 2002, he set a National League record with 55 saves and became only the second pitcher in history (joining Dennis Eckersley) to record both a 20-win season and a 50-save season. He is the only pitcher in Major League history to record both 200 wins and 150 saves.

Smoltz was one of the most successful pitchers in playoff history, posting a record of 15–4 with a 2.67 earned run average (ERA) in 41 career postseason games (and in two of those four losses, he surrendered only unearned runs). He was named the Most Valuable Player of the 1992 NL Championship Series; Andy Pettitte later broke his record for career postseason wins. Smoltz led the NL in wins, winning percentage, strikeouts and innings pitched twice each, and his NL total of 3,084 strikeouts ranked fifth in league history when he retired. He also holds the Braves' franchise record for career strikeouts (3,011), and the record for the most career games pitched for the Braves (708) since the club's move to Atlanta in 1966; from 2004 to 2014, he held the franchise record for career saves and has the single season record. Smoltz left the Braves after 2008 and split his final season with the Boston Red Sox and St. Louis Cardinals. Since retiring as a player, he has served as a color commentator and analyst for both Fox Sports and MLB Network. Since 2016, he has provided color commentary during baseball's biggest televised events, notably the All-Star Game and World Series. He was elected to the Baseball Hall of Fame in his first year of eligibility in 2015.

== Early life ==
John Andrew Smoltz was born on May 15, 1967, in Warren, Michigan. Smoltz was an All-State baseball player at Waverly High School in Lansing, Michigan, where he played two seasons after transferring from Lansing Catholic High School. He was also an all-conference basketball player as a 6-foot-2-inch (1.88 m) guard in high school, drawing some interest from college coaches. He elected to concentrate on baseball.

Following his high school career, Smoltz committed to play baseball at Michigan State University, but elected to sign a professional contract after being drafted by the Detroit Tigers and receiving a substantial bonus offer.

== Professional career ==
=== Draft and minor leagues ===
The Detroit Tigers selected him in the 22nd round of the 1985 amateur draft, 574th overall. Smoltz played initially for the Single-A Lakeland Tigers minor-league team, and then moved on to the Double-A Glens Falls Tigers in 1987, posting records of 7–8 and 4–10. In 1987, the Tigers were in a three-team race, chasing the Toronto Blue Jays for the AL East division lead; in need of pitching help, Detroit sent their 20-year-old prospect to the Braves for 36-year-old veteran Doyle Alexander on August 12. While Alexander did help the Tigers overtake the Blue Jays for the division title, going 9–0 with a 1.93 ERA down the stretch, he was out of baseball by 1989. Smoltz, in contrast, became one of the cornerstones of the Braves franchise for the next two decades.

=== Atlanta Braves (1988–1999, 2001–2008) ===
==== Early years (1988–1997) ====
Smoltz made his major league debut on July 23, 1988 with a start against the New York Mets. His first major league strikeout victim was Darryl Strawberry, who he dispatched on a high fastball, a memory he cherishes. In the game, he outpitched Bob Ojeda in a 6-1 Braves' victory, giving up one run in eight innings. His season went downhill from there, as he finished with a 2-7 record and a 5.48 ERA. In 1989, Smoltz blossomed. Over 29 starts, he recorded a 12–11 record and 2.94 ERA while pitching 208 innings, and was named to the NL All-Star team. Teammate Tom Glavine also had his first good year in 1989, raising optimism about the future of Atlanta's pitching staff.

Smoltz began the 1991 season with a 2–11 record. He began seeing a sports psychologist, after which he closed out the season on a 12–2 pace, helping the Braves win a tight NL West race. His winning ways continued into the 1991 National League Championship Series. Smoltz won both his starts against the Pittsburgh Pirates, capped by a complete game shutout in the seventh game, propelling the Braves to their first World Series since moving to Atlanta in 1966. Smoltz had two no-decisions against the Minnesota Twins, with a 1.26 ERA. In the seventh and deciding game, he faced his former Detroit Tiger hero, Jack Morris. Both starters pitched shutout ball for seven innings, before Smoltz was removed from the scoreless game during a Twins threat in the eighth. Atlanta reliever Mike Stanton pitched out of the jam, getting Smoltz off the hook, and Morris eventually pitched a 10-inning complete-game victory.

The next year, Smoltz won 15 regular-season games and was the MVP of the 1992 National League Championship Series, winning two games. He left the seventh game trailing, but ended up with a no-decision as the Braves mounted a dramatic ninth-inning comeback win. In the 1992 World Series against the Toronto Blue Jays, Smoltz had two starts and received a no-decision in Game 2 and a win with the Braves facing elimination in Game 5. The Braves lost in six games.

Before the 1993 season, the Braves signed renowned control pitcher Greg Maddux, completing — along with Smoltz and Glavine — what many consider to be the most accomplished starting pitching trio ever assembled on a single major-league team. Smoltz again won 15 games, but suffered his first postseason loss to the Philadelphia Phillies in the NLCS despite not allowing an earned run.

Smoltz pitched through injury during strike-shortened 1994 season, posting a 6-10 record and a 4.24 ERA. In September, he had bone chips surgically removed from his elbow.

Returning as the Braves' No. 3 starter in 1995, he posted a 12–7 record. Ironically, the year the Braves won their one World Series title in their long run of division titles was the one year Smoltz had shaky postseason numbers. He did avoid being tagged with any losses despite a 6.60 ERA, but his Game 3 start in that World Series was his only poor World Series start in his career, getting knocked out in the third inning. The rest of the team picked him up, as Smoltz and the Braves won the franchise's first World Series since moving to Atlanta in 1966, thanks in great part to Maddux and Glavine, who had begun to overshadow Smoltz. Smoltz would have been the Game 7 starter had the series gone that far.

In 1996, Smoltz went 24–8 with a 2.94 ERA and 276 strikeouts, including winning a franchise-record 14 straight decisions from April 9 to June 19. His wins and strikeout totals led the majors that year. Smoltz continued to pitch brilliantly in the postseason, winning game 1 in the Division Series, games 1 and 5 in the League Championship Series, and game 1 in the World Series. Game 5 was his only loss in the postseason, after an outfield error eventually led to Charlie Hayes scoring the game's sole unearned run. The Braves fell to the New York Yankees in six games. Smoltz concluded the playoffs with a 0.95 ERA and won the NL Cy Young Award with 26 of the 28 first-place votes. Smoltz's effectiveness in 1997 was only slightly less than in his Cy Young season, but frugal run support limited him to a 15–12 record. Smoltz also received a Silver Slugger Award for his batting, as he led all pitchers with 18 base hits.

==== Injuries and move to the bullpen (1998–2004) ====
Smoltz continued to post excellent statistics in 1998 and 1999 but he was spending significant time on the disabled list and missed about a quarter of his starts. In 1999, Smoltz began experimenting with both a knuckleball and a three-quarters delivery, although he rarely used either in game situations. He underwent Tommy John surgery before the 2000 season and missed the entire year. When he was unable to perform effectively as a starter in 2001, Smoltz transitioned to the bullpen, replacing John Rocker as the Braves' closer.

In 2002, his first full season as a closer, Smoltz set a National League record with 55 saves, topping the previous mark of 53, shared by Randy Myers (1993) and Trevor Hoffman (1998). (Éric Gagné equaled his record a year later with the Dodgers.) Smoltz finished third in the Cy Young Award voting. Injuries limited Smoltz slightly in 2003, but he still recorded 45 saves with a 1.12 ERA in 64 1/3 innings pitched. In 2004, Smoltz finished with 44 saves, but was frustrated with his inability to make an impact as a closer during another Braves' postseason loss. That year, he broke Gene Garber's franchise record of 141 career saves; his final total of 154 saves was eventually surpassed by Craig Kimbrel in 2014. By this point, Smoltz was the final remaining member of the Braves' dominant rotation of the 1990s. Glavine had moved on to play for the Mets, a divisional rival, while Maddux returned to his old team, the Chicago Cubs.

==== Return to the rotation (2005–2008) ====
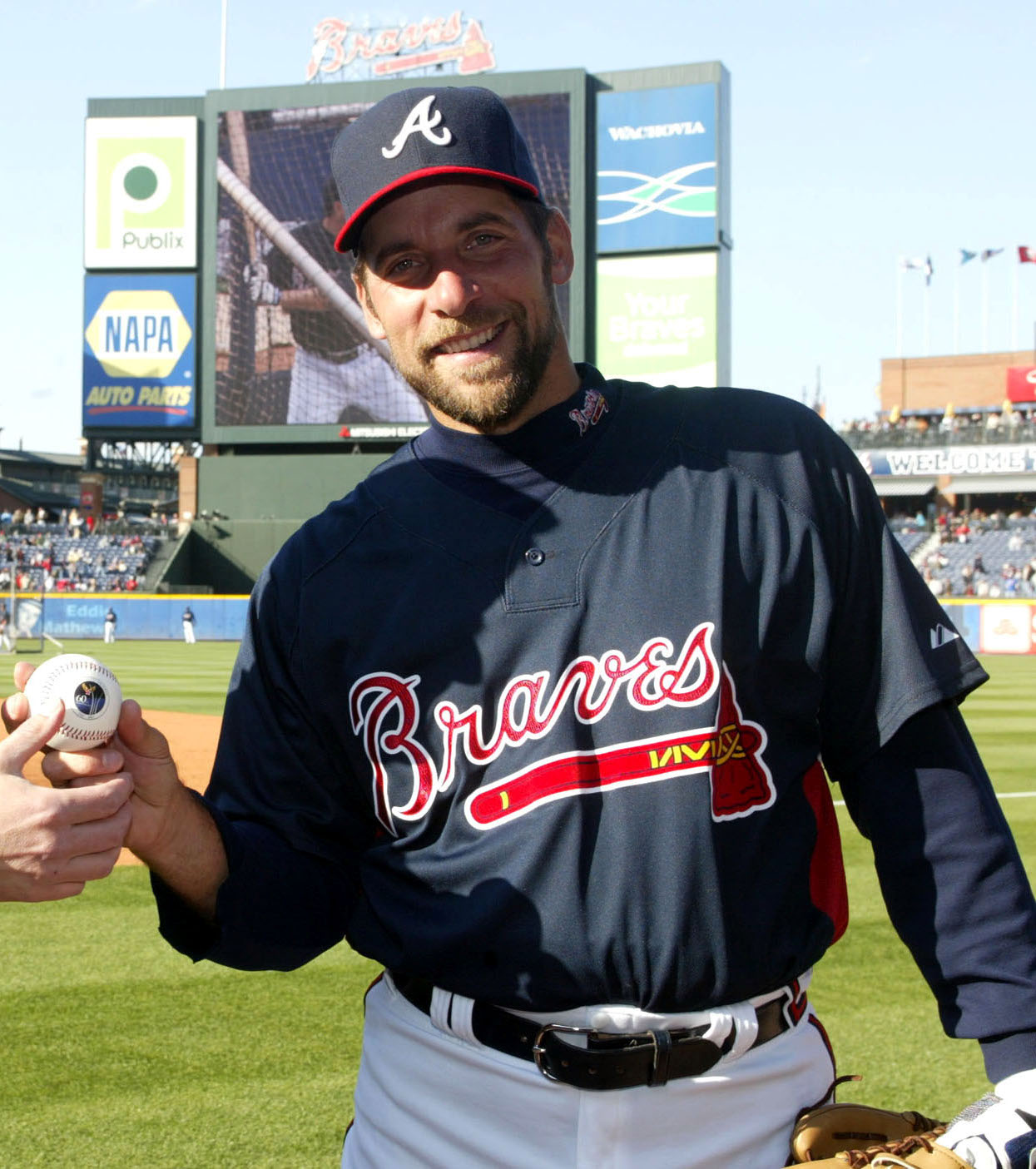
Smoltz in 2007

After three years as a closer, Smoltz returned to the starting rotation entering the 2005 season. His renewed career as a starter began inauspiciously. He allowed six earned runs in only 1 2/3 innings—matching the shortest starts of his career—as the Braves were blown out on Opening Day by the Marlins. Poor run support contributed to an 0–3 start despite stronger pitching performances by Smoltz. After these initial difficulties, though, things fell into place. At the All-Star break, Smoltz was 9–5 with an ERA of 2.68 and was chosen for the 2005 NL All-Star team. Smoltz gave up a solo home run to Miguel Tejada in the second inning of the American League's 7–5 victory and was charged with the loss. For his career, he was 1–2 in All-Star games, putting him in a tie for the most losses.

Smoltz finished 2005 at 14–7, with a 3.06 ERA and 169 strikeouts while allowing less than one hit per inning. Smoltz had answered the critics who doubted he would be able to reach the 200-inning plateau after three years in the bullpen. Nonetheless, Smoltz's increased workload caused him to wear down toward the end of the season.

Despite a sore shoulder, Smoltz pitched seven innings in the Braves' 7–1 win over the Houston Astros in Game 2 of the 2005 NL Division Series; it was the only game the Braves won in the series against the eventual National League champions. The victory over Houston gave Smoltz a 13–4 record as a starter (15–4 overall) with a 2.65 ERA in the postseason. In two of those post-season losses, he surrendered only unearned runs. He has the second-most postseason wins (15) behind only Andy Pettitte with 19. They are followed by Glavine (14) and Maddux (11).

In 2006, Smoltz finished the season with a record of 16–9, an ERA of 3.49, and 211 strikeouts. He was one of four pitchers tied for the NL lead in wins, and was third in strikeouts.

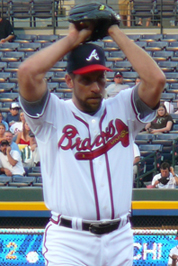
Smoltz in 2007

On September 21, 2006, the Braves announced they had picked up Smoltz's $8 million contract option for the 2007 season. On April 26, 2007, Smoltz agreed to a contract extension with the Braves, which included a $14 million salary for the 2008 season, a $12 million vesting option for 2009 dependent on his ability to pitch 200 innings in 2008, and a $12 or $13 million team option for 2010 dependent on his ability to pitch 200 innings in 2009.

2007 was a year of reunions and milestones for Smoltz. On May 9, he faced Maddux for the first time since July 10, 1992. Smoltz earned a win in a 3–2 victory over the San Diego Padres; Maddux did not receive a decision. On May 24, 11 years to the day after recording his 100th career win, Smoltz faced Glavine and recorded his 200th career win. He faced Glavine three other times, faring 3–1 overall against him. On June 27, Smoltz, Glavine and Maddux each recorded wins on the same day. On August 19, Smoltz set the Braves strikeout record by striking out the Arizona Diamondbacks' Mark Reynolds. It was his 2,913th strikeout, passing Phil Niekro on the club's all-time list; he struck out a season-high 12 in the game. He finished the year 14–8 with a 3.11 ERA and 197 strikeouts. The stalwart pitcher was the only holdover on the Braves roster from their 1991 worst-to-first season until Glavine returned to the Braves after an absence of several years following the 2007 season.

On April 22, 2008, Smoltz became the 16th pitcher in Major League history to reach 3,000 career strikeouts, and the fourth pitcher to strike out 3,000 batters for one team, joining Walter Johnson, Bob Gibson and Steve Carlton.

On April 28, 2008, Smoltz was placed on the 15-day disabled list due to an inflamed right shoulder.

==== Return to relief (2008) ====
On May 1, 2008, Smoltz indicated that he intended to return to being a relief pitcher. After coming off the disabled list on June 2, 2008, he was given his first save opportunity since he had rejoined the rotation after the 2004 season. He blew the save; two days later, the Braves placed him back on the disabled list. Smoltz underwent season-ending shoulder surgery on June 10, 2008. His contract expired at the end of the season, and the contract offer from the Braves was not sufficient to keep him.

=== Boston Red Sox (2009) ===
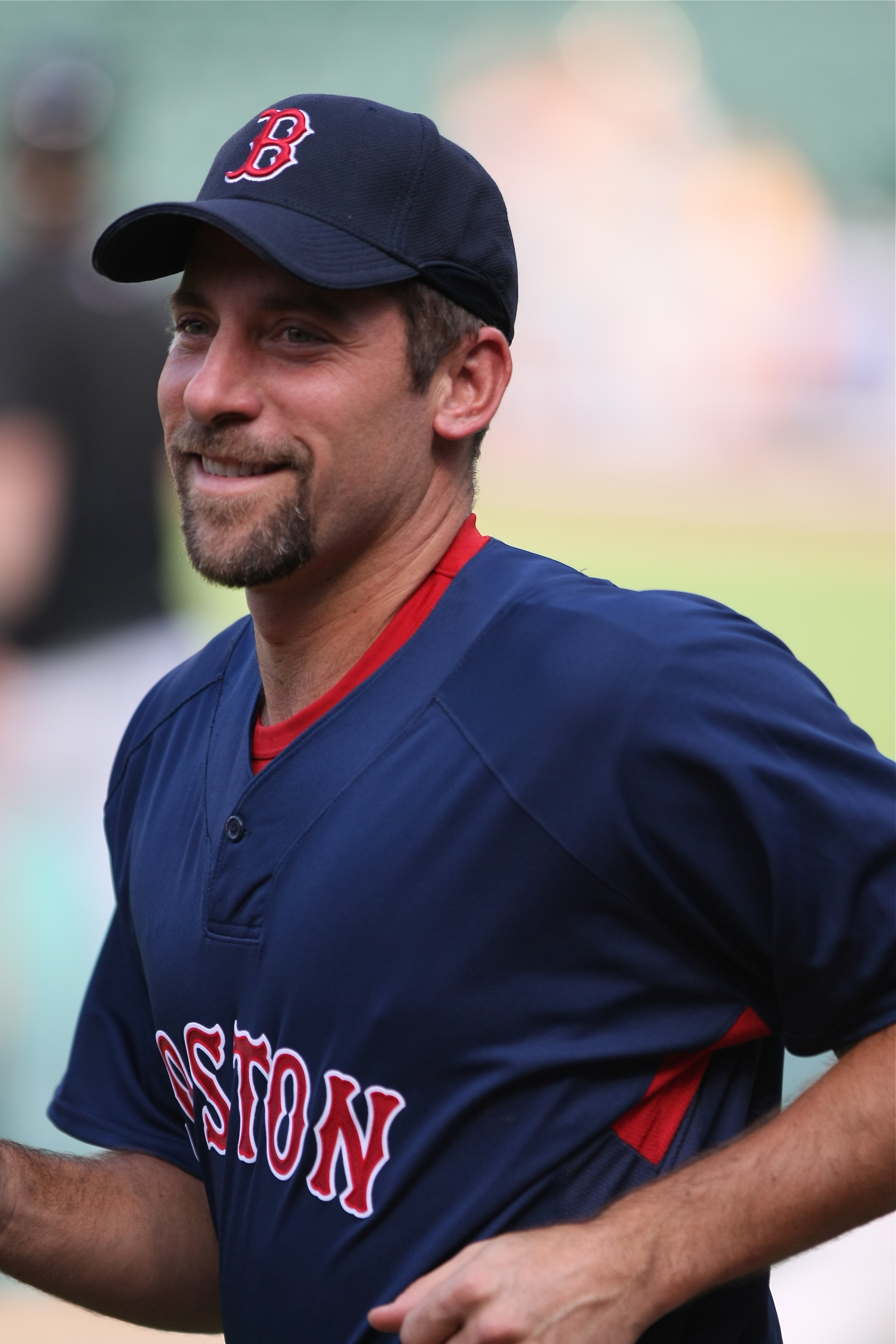
Smoltz with the Boston Red Sox

In December 2008, several members of the Boston Red Sox organization, including pitching coach John Farrell, vice president of player personnel Ben Cherington and assistant trainer Mike Reinold, flew to Atlanta to participate in a 90-minute workout with Smoltz. Throwing for only the second time since having surgery on a torn labrum in his pitching shoulder, Smoltz threw a 50-pitch side session and showcased his progress since the surgery. He sufficiently impressed the Red Sox that less than a month later they offered him a one-year contract.

On January 13, 2009, Smoltz signed a one-year contract with the Red Sox for a reported base salary of $5.5 million, with roster time incentives and miscellaneous award incentives which could net as much as $10 million. He made his first start in the Red Sox rotation on June 25, allowing seven hits and five runs through five innings. Smoltz posted a 2–5 record over eight games with an 8.33 ERA and no quality starts. He was designated for assignment on August 7 after a 13–6 loss to the New York Yankees, giving the Red Sox ten days to release or trade him or send him to the minors. The Red Sox offered Smoltz a minor league stint in order to prepare him to be placed in the bullpen, but he rejected the offer. On August 17, the Red Sox released Smoltz.

=== St. Louis Cardinals (2009) ===
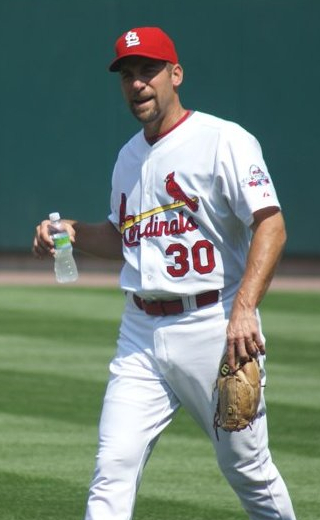
Smoltz with the Cardinals on September 3, 2009

On August 19, 2009, Smoltz signed with the St. Louis Cardinals; he made his debut against the Padres on August 23. In his first game for the Cardinals, he went five innings, striking out nine and walking none, while setting a Cardinals franchise record by striking out seven batters in a row.

He earned the win against the Padres, but that was to be his last one. Smoltz finished 1–3 with an ERA of 4.26 with the Cardinals. He was 3–8 with an ERA of 6.35 overall on the season. In Game 3 of the 2009 NL Division Series, Smoltz pitched two innings of relief in a losing cause, allowing four hits and one earned run while striking out five.

=== Pitching arsenal ===
Over his career, Smoltz threw a four-seam fastball that was clocked as high as 98 miles per hour, a strong, effective slider, and an 88–91 mph split-finger fastball that he used as a strikeout pitch. He also used a curveball and change-up on occasion, and in 1999, began experimenting with both a knuckleball and a screwball, although he rarely used either in game situations. Warning of the damage that throwing a slider can do the arm, he said in 2016 that he never learned to throw sliders until he reached the Majors, and does not recommend that children should throw sliders at all.

== Post-playing career ==
In 2008 and 2010, Smoltz served as a color analyst alongside Joe Simpson for Braves games on Peachtree TV. Nationally, Smoltz has been an analyst for MLB Network and called regular-season and postseason games for TBS. In 2014, he was hired by Fox Sports as a game analyst. He was paired with Matt Vasgersian and called games in the No. 2 booth. He has also joined Fox Sports South and SportSouth to be an analyst for select Braves games during the 2014 season. Smoltz replaced Harold Reynolds and Tom Verducci, his colleagues from MLB Network, as the lead analyst for Major League Baseball on Fox for the 2016 season, teaming up with Joe Buck and, later, Joe Davis. In 2021, Smoltz won his first Sports Emmy Award as an Event Analyst. Smoltz was forced to end his in-studio work for MLB Network after he refused to receive the COVID-19 vaccine, which is required for the company's employees.

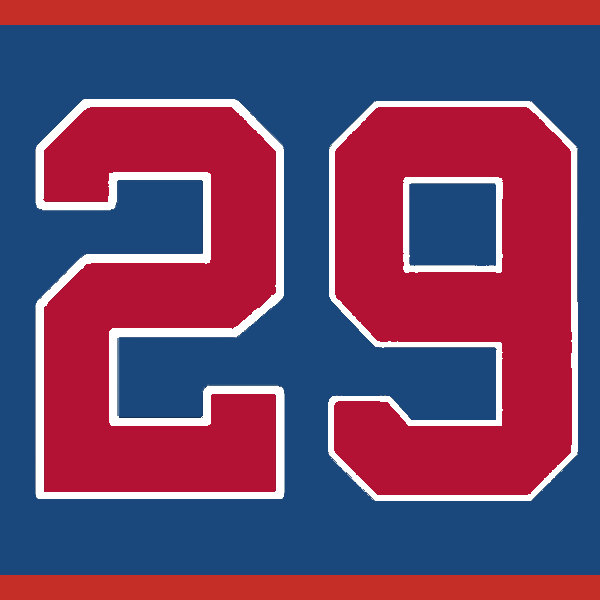
John Smoltz's number 29 was retired by the Atlanta Braves in 2012.

On April 16, 2012, the Braves announced that they would retire Smoltz's number 29. The ceremony, which took place before a June 8 game against the Toronto Blue Jays, included speeches by former broadcaster Pete van Wieren, former teammate Matt Diaz and former manager Bobby Cox.

Smoltz was elected to the Baseball Hall of Fame in his first year of eligibility in 2015. He was the first starting pitcher since 1987 to be elected despite having fewer than 250 wins and only one Cy Young Award, the first such starter ever elected on the first ballot, and the first pitcher to have Tommy John surgery and be elected to the Hall.

== Personal life ==
Smoltz met his first wife, Dyan Struble, at the Omni Hotel in downtown Atlanta; the couple had four children before divorcing in 2007 after 16 years of marriage. On May 16, 2009, Smoltz married Kathryn Darden at his home, with 70 friends and family in attendance.

Smoltz lives in Alpharetta, Georgia and also has a home at Sea Island, a golf resort. He is a Christian.

Smoltz is a good friend of pro golfer Tiger Woods; the two often play golf together. Woods has stated that Smoltz is the best golfer outside of the PGA Tour that he has seen. Smoltz has stated that he once had a plus 4 handicap. In 2018, Smoltz qualified for the U.S. Senior Open, one of senior golf's major championships. He is also involved in the sport of bowling.

Smoltz plays every year in the American Century Championship at Lake Tahoe. He won the Diamond Resorts Tournament of Champions in Orlando in January 2019.

Smoltz counts Doc Rivers as a personal friend dating back to Rivers's playing days in Atlanta. In the January 12, 2009, edition of the Boston Globe, Rivers is quoted as saying, "I offered him my apartment... I just told him about Terry (Francona) and the Red Sox organization. I told him it's a no-brainer." With Rivers's encouragement, Smoltz signed a three year contract with the Red Sox before the 2019 season.

Smoltz is also an accomplished accordionist and has starred in a television commercial for The Home Depot.

Smoltz is a distant cousin of fellow Baseball Hall of Famer Charlie Gehringer.

=== Politics ===
Smoltz produced an automated campaign phone recording on behalf of the candidacy of Ralph E. Reed, Jr. for Lieutenant Governor of Georgia during the 2006 primary.

In a 2004 interview, Smoltz was quoted as comparing the legalization of gay marriage with bestiality, saying "What's next? Marrying an animal?" per the Associated Press. Smoltz later stated the article had portrayed his quote inaccurately.

It was speculated that Smoltz might run for Congress in 2010 as a Republican candidate to fill the departing John Linder's seat in Georgia's 7th congressional district.

On April 22, 2012, Smoltz hosted a fundraiser for Andrea Cascarilla, a Democratic candidate for State Representative in Michigan's 71st House District. The 71st District encompasses Waverly Senior High School, where Smoltz was an All-State baseball and basketball player.

=== Philanthropy ===
Smoltz and his good friend Jeff Foxworthy hosted the charity event "An Evening With Smoltz and Friends" on November 9, 2008, at the Verizon Amphitheater in Alpharetta to raise money for the John Smoltz Foundation, which has supported numerous charitable endeavors in the Atlanta area over the past decade.

Smoltz is the Atlanta host for Big League Impact, an eight-city fantasy football network created and led by longtime Cardinals pitcher and former teammate Adam Wainwright. In 2015, the organization raised more than $1 million for various charitable organizations.

Smoltz and Ryan Klesko, his former teammate on the Braves, were named in a tax dispute involving conservation easement for a 1,546-acre (626 ha) non-cash donation that they had made. On April 25, 2024, the court cleared the two of fraud charges, but reduced the assessed value of the donated easement to one-tenth of the claimed amount, and imposed a 40% penalty.

== Accomplishments ==
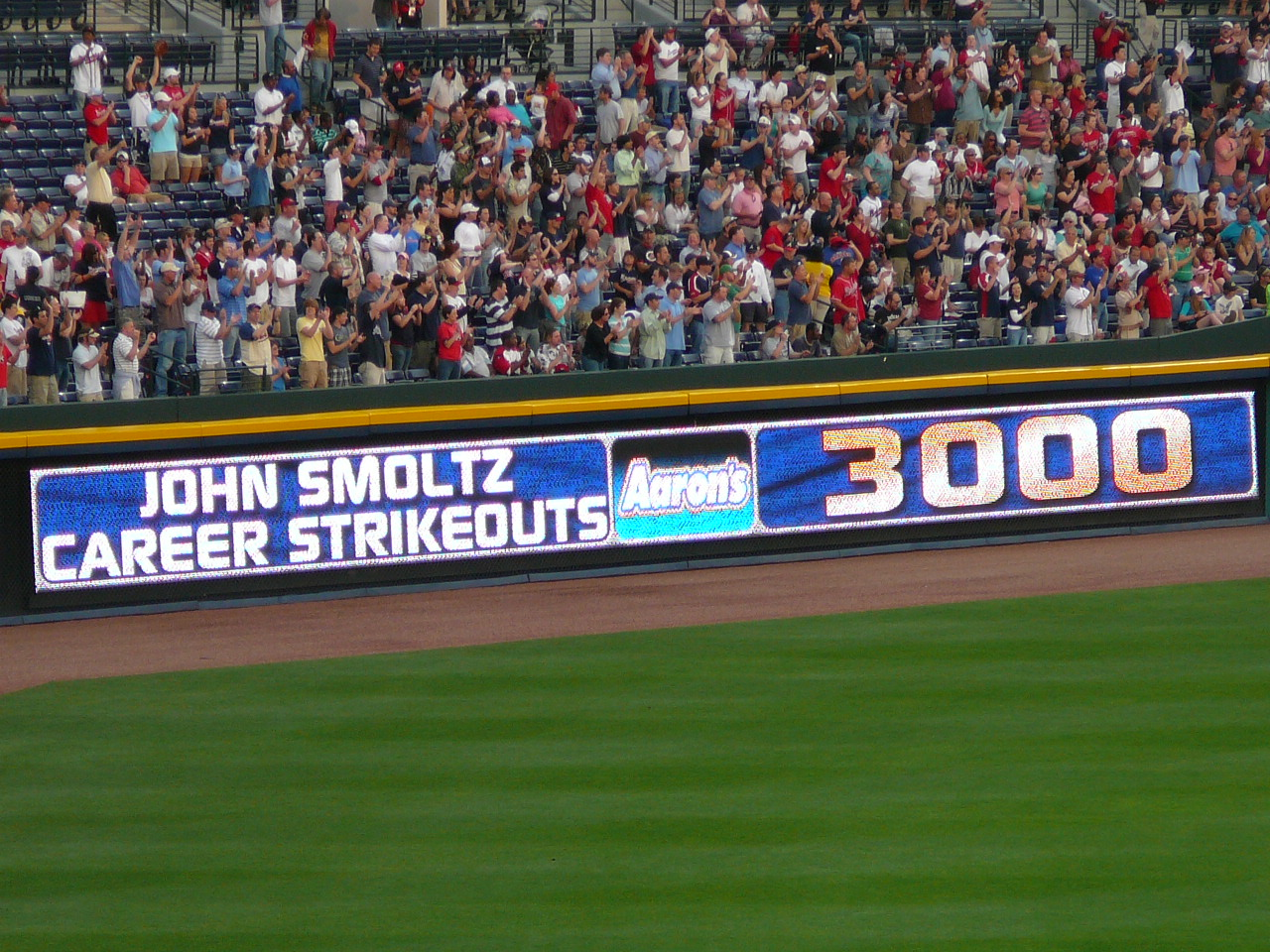
Fans at Turner Field stand and applaud after Smoltz's 3,000th career strikeout on April 22, 2008.

- Elected to the National Baseball Hall of Fame with 82.88% of the vote (January 2015)
- Eight-time All-Star (1989, 1992–93, 1996, 2002–03, 2005, 2007)
- National League Championship Series MVP (1992)
- Led the National League in Strikeouts (1992, with 215)
- National League Cy Young Award winner (1996)
- Atlanta Braves record for most wins in a season (1996, with 24)
- Led National League in wins (1996, with 24)
- Counting his wins in the playoffs and All-Star Game, amassed 29 wins in 1996; the only higher total in the last 70 years is Denny McLain, who had 32 in 1968.
- Led major leagues in strikeouts (1996, with 276)
- Led National League in winning percentage (1996)
- Silver Slugger Award winner for pitcher (1997)
- Finished 4th in National League Cy Young Award voting (1998)
- Led major leagues in winning percentage (1998)
- National League Rolaids Relief Man of the Year Award winner (2002)
- Finished 8th in National League MVP voting (2002)
- Finished 3rd in National League Cy Young Award voting (2002)
- Second in Braves history for saves in a career (154)
- Braves record for most saves in a season (2002, with 55)
- Led National League in saves (2002, with 55)
- Tied for National League lead in wins (2006, with 16)
- Only pitcher to compile 200 wins and 150 saves
- Holds Braves record for most strikeouts in a career (3,011)
- Given the Branch Rickey Award for exceptional community service (2007)
- First pitcher in modern era (since 1900) to pitch exactly five shutout innings, strike out ten, and get the win (April 17, 2008, in the Braves' 8–0 win at Florida)
- 16th pitcher in the major leagues to reach 3,000 strikeouts (April 22, 2008)
- Holds Cardinals record for most consecutive strikeouts (7) in a single game (August 23, 2009)
- Only major league pitcher with more than one postseason stolen base (3)
- Awarded Roberto Clemente Award (2005)

== See also ==
- List of Major League Baseball career strikeout leaders
- List of Major League Baseball career wins leaders
- List of Major League Baseball annual strikeout leaders
- List of Major League Baseball annual wins leaders
- List of Major League Baseball annual saves leaders

Preceded by Harold Reynolds and Tom Verducci	Lead color commentator, Major League Baseball on Fox; 2016–present	Succeeded by Incumbent
