= Waverly, Michigan =

- Census-designated place (CDP) & unincorporated community
- Location of Waverly in Eaton County, Michigan
- Coordinates: 42°44′21″N 84°37′15″W
- Country: United States
- State: Michigan
- County: Eaton
- Township: Delta

Area
  - Total: 9.16 sq mi (23.72 km^{2})
  - Land: 9.10 sq mi (23.58 km^{2})
  - Water: 0.054 sq mi (0.14 km^{2})
- Elevation: 860 ft (262 m)

Population (2020)
  - Total: 23,812
  - Density: 2,615.7/sq mi (1,009.93/km^{2})
- Time zone: UTC-5 (Eastern (EST))
  - Summer (DST): UTC-4 (EDT)
- ZIP code: 48917 (Lansing)
- Area code: 517
- FIPS code: 26-84800
- GNIS feature ID: 1617923

Waverly is an unincorporated community in Eaton County in the U.S. state of Michigan. It is a census-designated place (CDP) for statistical purposes and has no legal status as a municipality. The population was 23,812 at the 2020 census. Waverly is home to the Lansing Mall and Waverly Community Schools.

The community is within Delta Charter Township and adjacent to the city of Lansing and Lansing Charter Township. The Lansing ZIP code 48917 serves the area defined by the Waverly CDP.

== Geography ==
According to the United States Census Bureau, the CDP has a total area of 9.1 square miles (23.6 km^{2}), of which 9.1 square miles (23.5 km^{2}) is land and 0.04 square miles (0.1 km^{2}), or 0.61%, is water.

== Demographics ==
Historical population
Census	Pop.	Note	%±
2000	16,194		—
2010	23,925		47.7%
2020	23,812		−0.5%
U.S. Decennial Census

=== Racial and ethnic composition ===
Waverly CDP, Michigan – Racial and ethnic composition Note: the US Census treats Hispanic/Latino as an ethnic category. This table excludes Latinos from the racial categories and assigns them to a separate category. Hispanics/Latinos may be of any race.
Race / Ethnicity (NH = Non-Hispanic)	Pop 2000	Pop 2010	Pop 2020	% 2000	% 2010	% 2020
White alone (NH)	12,769	17,117	15,491	78.85%	71.54%	65.06%
Black or African American alone (NH)	1,709	3,241	3,607	10.55%	13.55%	15.15%
Native American or Alaska Native alone (NH)	54	111	69	0.33%	0.46%	0.29%
Asian alone (NH)	537	1,006	1,370	3.32%	4.20%	5.75%
Native Hawaiian or Pacific Islander alone (NH)	6	1	3	0.04%	0.00%	0.01%
Other race alone (NH)	33	44	76	0.20%	0.18%	0.32%
Mixed race or Multiracial (NH)	347	753	1,219	2.14%	3.15%	5.12%
Hispanic or Latino (any race)	739	1,652	1,977	4.56%	6.90%	8.30%
Total	16,194	23,925	23,812	100.00%	100.00%	100.00%

=== 2020 census ===
As of the 2020 census, Waverly had a population of 23,812. The median age was 40.7 years. 17.6% of residents were under the age of 18 and 21.8% of residents were 65 years of age or older. For every 100 females there were 90.1 males, and for every 100 females age 18 and over there were 86.7 males age 18 and over.

99.8% of residents lived in urban areas, while 0.2% lived in rural areas.

There were 11,165 households in Waverly, of which 20.7% had children under the age of 18 living in them. Of all households, 37.5% were married-couple households, 20.6% were households with a male householder and no spouse or partner present, and 34.2% were households with a female householder and no spouse or partner present. About 39.2% of all households were made up of individuals and 15.3% had someone living alone who was 65 years of age or older.

There were 11,720 housing units, of which 4.7% were vacant. The homeowner vacancy rate was 0.8% and the rental vacancy rate was 5.8%.

Racial composition as of the 2020 census
Race	Number	Percent
White	16,044	67.4%
Black or African American	3,703	15.6%
American Indian and Alaska Native	126	0.5%
Asian	1,382	5.8%
Native Hawaiian and Other Pacific Islander	5	0.0%
Some other race	641	2.7%
Two or more races	1,911	8.0%

=== 2010 census ===
As of the census of 2010, there were 23,925 people living in the CDP. The population density was 2,638 inhabitants per square mile (1,019/km^{2}).

=== 2000 census ===
As of the census of 2000, there were 16,194 people, 6,866 households, and 4,304 families living in the CDP. The population density was 2,845.1 inhabitants per square mile (1,098.5/km^{2}). There were 7,130 housing units at an average density of 1,252.7 per square mile (483.7/km^{2}). The racial makeup of the CDP was 81.33% White, 10.70% Black or African American, 0.36% Native American, 3.37% Asian, 0.05% Pacific Islander, 1.56% from other races, and 2.64% from two or more races. Hispanic or Latino of any race were 4.56% of the population.

There were 6,866 households, out of which 29.3% had children under the age of 18 living with them, 49.4% were married couples living together, 10.4% had a female householder with no husband present, and 37.3% were non-families. 30.9% of all households were made up of individuals, and 10.7% had someone living alone who was 65 years of age or older. The average household size was 2.34 and the average family size was 2.96.

In the CDP, the population was spread out, with 23.6% under the age of 18, 10.1% from 18 to 24, 27.1% from 25 to 44, 26.1% from 45 to 64, and 13.1% who were 65 years of age or older. The median age was 38 years. For every 100 females, there were 89.5 males. For every 100 females age 18 and over, there were 85.4 males.

The median income for a household in the CDP was $51,148, and the median income for a family was $64,248. Males had a median income of $49,375 versus $32,064 for females. The per capita income for the CDP was $26,867. About 4.5% of families and 5.8% of the population were below the poverty line, including 6.7% of those under age 18 and 6.8% of those age 65 or over.
