= Eastern High School (Michigan) =

Public high school in Lansing, Michigan, United States

Lansing Eastern High School
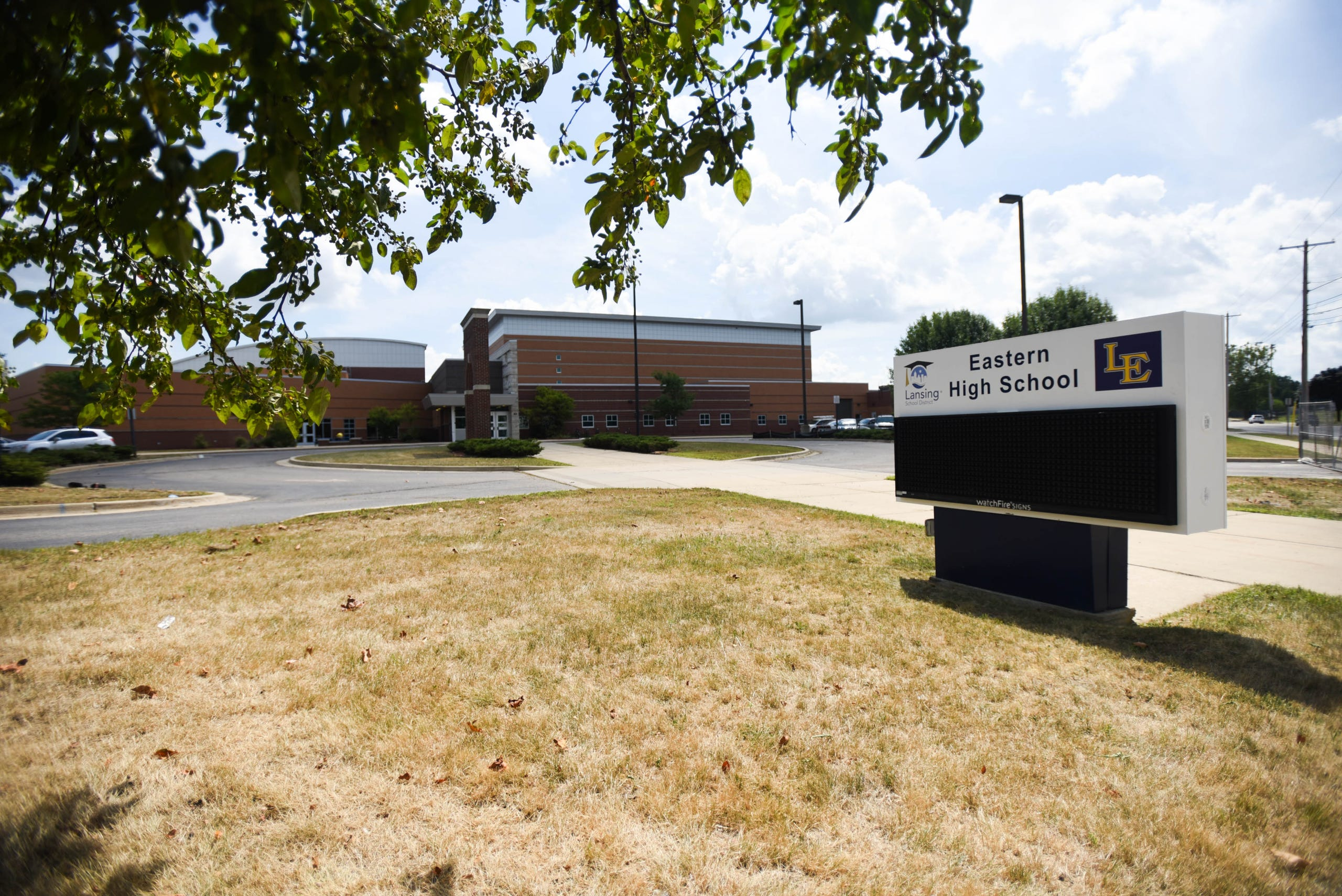

Location
- 626 Marshall St; Lansing, Michigan 48912; United States; 42.739800°N 84.526070°W

Information
- School type: Public, magnet high school
- Motto: "finis coronat opus"-the end crowns the work
- Established: 1928; 98 years ago
- School district: Lansing School District
- NCES School ID: 262115005792
- Principal: Marcelle Carruthers
- Teaching staff: 43.43 (FTE)
- Grades: 9 to 12
- Enrollment: 901 (2023-2024)
- Student to teacher ratio: 20.75
- Colors: Blue and gold
- Athletics conference: Capital Area Activities Conference
- Sports: Football, Soccer, Track, Cross Country, Boys Basketball, Girls Basketball, Baseball, Swimming & Diving
- Mascot: Quakers
- Nickname: LE, EQ
- Team name: Quakers
- Website: lansingschools.net/eastern

Student assessments
- 2024-2025 school year Change vs. prior year

M-STEP 11th grade proficiency rates (Science / Social Studies)
- Advanced %: 5.6 / ≤5
- Proficient %: 14.6 / –
- PR. Proficient %: 13.2 / 58.0
- Not Proficient %: 66.7 / 25.9

Average test scores
- SAT Total: 1470 (▲ +80)

Lansing Eastern High School is a public, magnet high school in Lansing, Michigan as part of the Lansing School District. Eastern International Baccalaureate Magnet High School is the only high school in mid-Michigan authorized to offer students the opportunity to earn an International Baccalaureate Full Diploma. Eastern also has the second-largest alumni association in the United States. It was located on the city's east-side on Pennsylvania Avenue, one block north of Michigan Avenue but is now located on Marshall Street on the corner of Marshall Street and Saginaw Street. The building was connected with former Pattengill Middle School next to Sparrow Hospital. In 2007, Sparrow purchased the Pattengill property to create a parking lot. With the deconstruction of Pattengill Middle School, Lansing Eastern became the oldest operational school in the Lansing School District. It opened in 1928 as the second high school in the city. The athletic teams were named Quakers because the school was located on Pennsylvania Avenue and a Society of Friends (Quaker) meeting house was located across the street. In March 2012 the Lansing School District announced that Eastern would house 7-12 grades beginning in the 2012–2013 school year. On January 20, 2016, the Lansing School Board voted to sell the school to the Edward Sparrow Hospital Association for approximately $2.5 million. Students were relocated to the former Pattengill Middle School in Fall 2019. In April 2025, the school was demolished, with few decorations and other artifacts having been spared. The previous year, the school building was sold to University of Michigan-Sparrow Health System, which will seek to expand UM Sparrow Hospital's property along the area of East Michigan Avenue and Pennsylvania Avenue with the building of a new mental health facility.

== Athletics ==
Eastern's sports teams are known as the Quakers and are members of the Capital Area Activities Conference, with intracity rivals Everett High School and Sexton High School. The school adopted the Quaker as its mascot because the school was located on Pennsylvania Avenue and the Quakers settled in Pennsylvania State.

Until 1975, most of Eastern's indoor sports activities took place in the school gymnasium, which seated approximately 600 spectators and was unable to accommodate a full-sized basketball court. In the 1975–76 school year, the Lansing School District acquired and renovated the 4,200-seat field house at the adjacent Boys' Training School, then being closed by the State of Michigan. The field house was renamed in 1982 after longtime LEHS (Lansing Eastern High School) teacher and wrestling coach Don Johnson.

Outdoor sports such as track and football were played for many years at a field located between the Eastern and Pattengill school buildings. However this field had limited seating capacity which made it inadequate for varsity football games. In the late 1950s, after the construction of the 4,000-seat Memorial Stadium at Lansing Sexton, the two schools shared the home field until 2020.

In 2020, in conjunction with the construction of the new Eastern High School complex on Marshall Street, a new football/track facility was built on Pennsylvania Avenue adjacent to the Don Johnson Field House, baseball and softball fields and tennis courts. The new football stadium features an artificial surface and seating for approximately 2,500.

== Academics ==
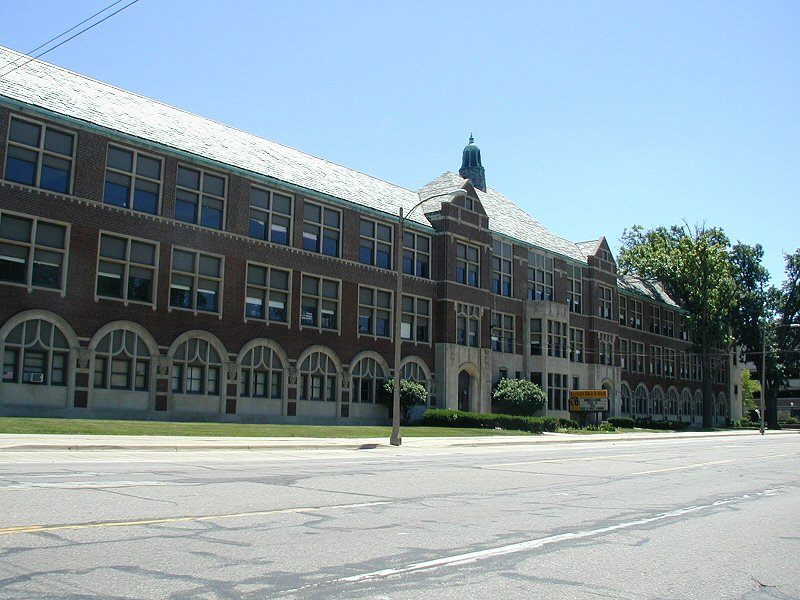
Old Eastern High School building in Lansing.

Eastern High School is known for its International Baccalaureate Diploma Program, the only school in the Lansing area to have such a program. Post Oak Academy, one of its feeder schools, houses the International Baccalaureate Primary Years Program and Chinese Immersion Program. Eastern also provides Biotechnology Magnet which is "Project Lead the Way (PLTW) curriculum offers specialized focused coursework for grades 7 - 9 adding grades 10 - 12 by 2022. Courses include activity, project and problem-based learning with topics including concepts in biology and medicine"
