= Aquinas High School (Michigan) =

School

Coordinates: 42°12′43.5″N 83°12′48.7″W

Aquinas High School was a grades 9-12 parochial high school located in the Detroit suburb of Southgate.

== History ==
Built under the joint effort of three local church parishes, St. Aloysius in Romulus, MI, St. Pius X in Southgate and Christ the Good Shepherd in Lincoln Park, classes for the first incoming freshman class began in 1966 at St. Pius X elementary school in Southgate while the high school building was nearing completion. The first senior class graduated in 1970.

Class sizes averaged around 300 students in the 1970s, and 200 students throughout the 1980s, with a full curriculum. However, various departments began phasing out about this time, beginning with the marching band program. The school eventually closed in 2001 due to declining enrollment (only 81 students comprised the four grade levels combined), and reduced funding from the Archdiocese of Detroit. Upon closure, remaining students were sent to other catholic high schools in the area, primarily Mount Carmel High School in Wyandotte, MI, Cabrini High School in Allen Park, MI, and Gabriel Richard Catholic High School in Riverview, MI.

=== Current ===
The building currently houses a few organizations, including The Guidance Center, which offers many free programs based out of the Aquinas Building including a Head Start program, which is a pre-school for low-income families.

== Alumni ==
- Paul Assenmacher, baseball pitcher for several MLB clubs in the 1980s and 1990s that included World Series appearances
- Jeff Kaiser, baseball pitcher for several MLB clubs in the 1980s and 1990s.
- Kevin Nash — former wrestler, World Championship Wrestling and World Wrestling Entertainment
- Mike Jolly — football defensive back for Bo Schembechler's University of Michigan Wolverines in the 1970s and the NFL Green Bay Packers in the 1980s.
- Ed Humenik, a golfer at the University of Michigan in the 1980s and the PGA Tour in the 1990s.
- Jon Garavaglia — Class of 1993 28-0 Class C Basketball State Champions, Winner of 1993 Hal Schram Mr. Basketball Award forward/guard for Legendary Coach Jud Headcote and Basketball Hall of Fame Coach Tom Izzo Michigan State University Spartans Played at MSU 1993-1997. Garavaglia went undrafted 1997 NBA Draft. However played professionally mostly in Europe for 7 years.
- Jason Singleton , Class of 1995 Singleton was a four-year member of the Ohio State University, mens basketball team. A proven leader Singleton was named Team Captain of the Buckeyes' 1999 NCAA Final Four squad. After OSU he began playing professionally in Australia for the West Sydney Razorbacks. 1993 Jason was a "Super Sophomore" for Class C 1993 28-0 Basketball State Champions. Alongside Antione Campbell Ashland University, OH All Time Leading assists record (697) 1998 & Jon Garavaglia Michigan State University.
- Ross Couples, a contributor to the humor blog of Miami Herald syndicated columnist, best selling author, and Pulitzer Prize winner Dave Barry.
- Gregory W. Pollack, is a judge of the Superior Court of San Diego County in California. He was appointed by former California Governor Arnold Schwarzenegger.
- James R. Downing, MD — president and CEO of St. Jude Children's Research Hospital.
