= Marcus Taylor =

American basketball player (born 1981)

Personal information
- Born: November 25, 1981 (age 44) Lansing, Michigan, US
- Listed height: 6 ft 3 in (1.91 m)
- Listed weight: 195 lb (88 kg)

Career information
- High school: Waverly (Lansing, Michigan)
- College: Michigan State (2000–2002)
- NBA draft: 2002: 2nd round, 52nd overall pick
- Drafted by: Minnesota Timberwolves
- Playing career: 2002–2009
- Position: Point guard / shooting guard

Career history
- 2003–2004: ASVEL Basket
- 2004: Southern Crescent Lightning
- 2004–2006: MENT Vassilakis
- 2005: Southern Crescent Lightning
- 2005: Albuquerque Thunderbirds
- 2006: Tulsa 66ers
- 2006–2009: TBB Trier
- 2009: Anaheim Arsenal

Career highlights
- McDonald's All-American (2000); Mr. Basketball of Michigan (2000); First-team Parade All-American (2000); Second-team Parade All-American (1999)
- Stats at Basketball Reference
Medals
Men's basketball
Representing United States
FIBA U21 World Championship
Gold medal – first place	2001 Saitama	Team competition

Marcus Taylor (born November 25, 1981) is an American former professional basketball player.

He was a Naismith All-American, McDonald's All-American, two-time Parade All-American and USA Today 1st-team All-American. He also went on to win Mr. Basketball of Michigan Award in 2000.

Taylor attended Michigan State University for two seasons before entering the NBA Draft. In his sophomore season, he became only the second player in Big Ten history to lead the conference in scoring and assists, and the first in MSU history. He won a gold medal on the FIBA Under-21 World Championship in Saitama, Japan.

Marcus was selected by the Minnesota Timberwolves as the 52nd pick in the 2002 NBA draft. In 2002, Taylor played for the Timberwolves in the Shaw's Pro Summer League. Taylor also played for Washington Wizards in 2003 Reebok Pro Summer League.

Since then he has played for the Sioux Falls Skyforce (CBA), ASVEL Lyon-Villeurbanne (France), MENT Vassilakis (Greece), the Southern Crescent Lightning (WBA), the Albuquerque Thunderbirds (G-League), the Tulsa 66ers (G-League), TBB Trier (Germany), and the Anaheim Arsenal (G-League). He officially retired from professional basketball in 2009 due to a career ending injury. Currently President and CEO of Marcus Taylor's Basketball Skills Development.
