= Waverly Senior High School =

Location
- 160 Snow Road; Lansing, Michigan 48917; United States; 42°43′53″N 84°37′16″W

Information
- Established: 1963
- School district: Waverly Community Schools
- Superintendent: Kelly Blake
- Principal: Tony Terranova
- Staff: 53.20 (FTE)
- Grades: 9-12
- Enrollment: 968 (2023–2024)
- Student to teacher ratio: 18.20
- Colors: Black and gold
- Athletics conference: Capital Area Activities Conference
- Mascot: The Warrior
- Nickname: Warriors
- Newspaper: The Pleiad
- Yearbook: The Iliad
- Website: waverlyhighschool.net
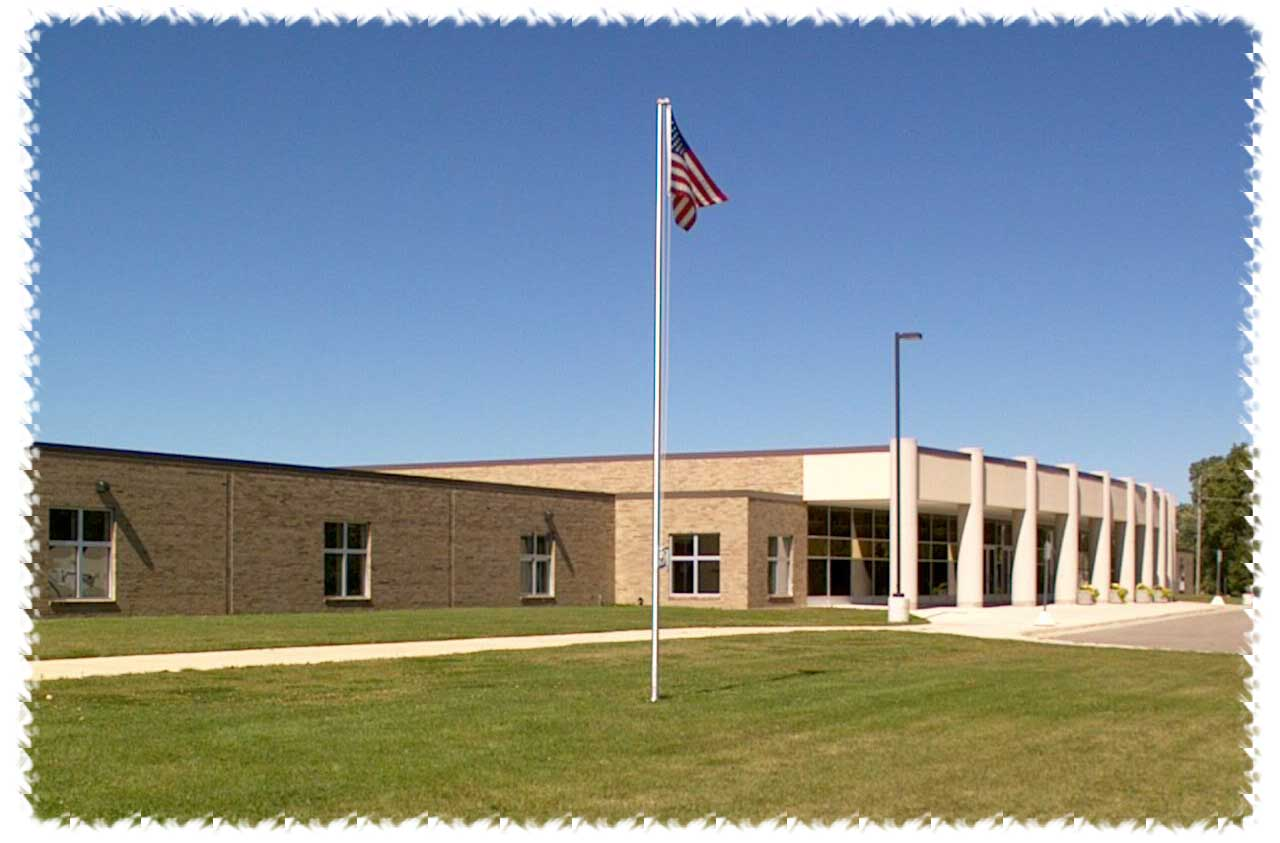
- Waverly High School Front

Waverly Senior High School, more commonly known as Waverly High School, is a High School located in the unincorporated community of Waverly, Michigan. As of February 2013 the school had 1,060 students in 9th to 12th grade.

In 1963, Waverly High School would be opened specifically for 10th and 11th graders due to the 12th graders deciding to stay with Sexton High School. Their first class would graduate two years later in 1965. During 1985, Waverly High School would allow for 9th grade enrollment.

Waverly Senior High School offers football, basketball, baseball, tennis, hockey, soccer, swimming, girls golf, cheer leading, bowling, and cross country. Students are also able to receive letters for academic achievement while participating in sports.

== Notable alumni ==
- Muhsin Muhammad - former National Football League player
- John Smoltz - former Major League Baseball player
- Danton Cole - former National Hockey League player
- Michael Kimball - American novelist
- Marcus Taylor- former professional basketball player
- Justin Ingram- (2003) member of 2000 Class A State Championship basketball team, former professional basketball player, current Assistant coach for the Toledo Rockets men's basketball team.
