= Lansing Charter Township, Michigan =

Lansing Township, Michigan
- Charter township
- Charter Township of Lansing
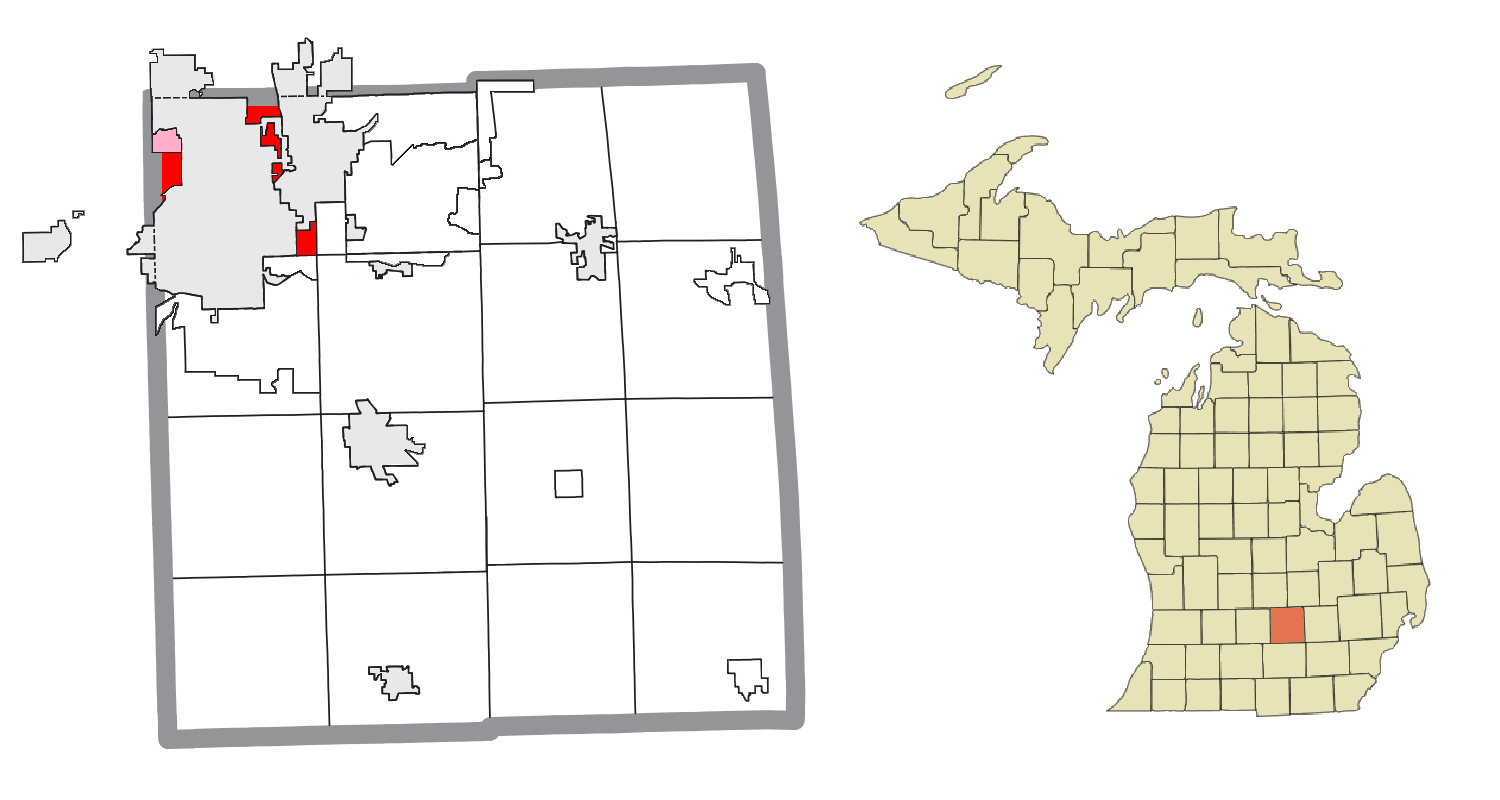
- Location within Ingham County (red) and the administered CDP of Edgemont Park (pink)

- Location within the state of Michigan Lansing Township (the United States)
- Coordinates: 42°45′26″N 84°31′43″W
- Country: United States
- State: Michigan
- County: Ingham
- Organized: 1842

Government
  - Supervisor: Maggie Sanders

Area
  - Total: 5.16 sq mi (13.36 km^{2})
  - Land: 4.93 sq mi (12.77 km^{2})
  - Water: 0.13 sq mi (0.34 km^{2})
- Elevation: 869 ft (265 m)

Population (2020)
  - Total: 8,143
- Time zone: UTC-5 (Eastern (EST))
  - Summer (DST): UTC-4 (EDT)
- ZIP code(s): 48910, 48912, 48915, 48917 (Lansing)
- Area code: 517
- FIPS code: 26-46020
- GNIS feature ID: 1626589
- Website: Official website

Lansing Charter Township is a charter township in Ingham County in the U.S. state of Michigan. It consists of six small non-contiguous areas which border the city of Lansing, including the census-designated place of Edgemont Park. As of the 2020 census, the township had a population of 8,143.

== History ==
The first white settler to purchase land in the township was Jacob F. Cooley in 1837. The township was organized in 1842 in the northwest corner of Ingham County and was named after Lansing, New York – the hometown of one of the township's original settlers. The township experienced its first loss of land in 1859 when the unincorporated settlement of Lansing officially incorporated as a city out of seven square miles near the center of the township.

On April 1, 1963, township voters voted to become a charter township, which provides for streamlined administration, expanded taxing authority, and added protection from annexation.

Historical population
Census	Pop.	Note	%±
1870	823		—
1880	1,209		46.9%
1890	1,422		17.6%
1900	1,353		−4.9%
1910	1,760		30.1%
1920	2,815		59.9%
1930	8,518		202.6%
1940	14,274		67.6%
1950	17,627		23.5%
1960	14,387		−18.4%
1970	11,270		−21.7%
1980	10,097		−10.4%
1990	8,919		−11.7%
2000	8,458		−5.2%
2010	8,126		−3.9%
2020	8,143		0.2%

== Geography ==
According to the United States Census Bureau, the township has a total area of 5.16 square miles (13.36 km^{2}), of which 4.93 square miles (12.77 km^{2}) is land and 0.13 square miles (0.34 km^{2}) (2.52%) is water.

== Description ==
The cities of Lansing and East Lansing have incorporated much of the land that formerly constituted the township reducing the township from its original 36 square miles (93 km^{2}) to its current 4.9 square miles (13 km^{2}) in six disconnected land areas.

The western section of the township is the largest, and traditionally included many of the township's industrial developments, including the large General Motors Lansing Craft Center and neighboring Lansing Metal Center automobile factories, both of which were closed in early 2006 and demolished in 2008. A Superfund site, the former site of Adams Plating, is also located in this part of the township. Also in the western part are the former Waverly Golf Course and the adjacent Michigan Avenue Park. The properties were sold for commercial and residential redevelopment in 2018. The CDP (census-designated place) of Edgemont Park is also located in this section of the township north of Saginaw Street (M-43) .

The northeastern section of the township is heavily industrialized west of Wood Road. However, since 2002, the area east of Wood Road has been developed as the 'downtown' of the township with the construction of the Eastwood Towne Center, one of the largest shopping malls in Metropolitan Lansing. The township created the Lansing Township Downtown Development Authority (DDA) in May 2003 to capture local property taxes for infrastructure development of the district.

The eastern sections of the township are mostly residential neighborhoods, though commercial development lines Grand River Avenue, Michigan Avenue, Kalamazoo Street and both sides of US-127. The northern portions of these sections include parts of the Groesbeck neighborhood north of Grand River Avenue and east of Wood Road. The southern portion includes part of the Urbandale neighborhood.

The southeastern section of the township is zoned exclusively for agricultural development, and contains research farms for Michigan State University, including the Dairy Cattle Teaching and Research Center, Horse Teaching and Research Center, Entomology Field Research Lab, and Botany Field Research Lab.

== Demographics ==
=== 2020 census ===
As of the census of 2020, there were 8,143 people in the township. The population density was 1,651.7 inhabitants per square mile (637.7/km^{2}). There were 4,397 housing units at an average density of 891.9 per square mile (344.4/km^{2}). The racial makeup of the township was 68.3% White (66.7 non-hispanic White), 13.5% African American, 0.6% Native American, 2.9% Asian, 0.0% Pacific Islander, 3.5% from other races, and 11.1% from two or more races. Hispanic or Latino of any race were 12.8% of the population.

=== 2010 census ===
As of the census of 2010, there were 8,126 people, 3,929 households, and 1,897 families residing in the township. The population density was 1,658.3 inhabitants per square mile (640.3/km^{2}). There were 4,319 housing units at an average density of 881.4 per square mile (340.3/km^{2}). The racial makeup of the township was 76.3% White, 12.5% African American, 0.5% Native American, 2.6% Asian, 0.0% Pacific Islander, 3.5% from other races, and 4.7% from two or more races. Hispanic or Latino of any race were 10.9% of the population.

=== 2000 census ===
There were 4,104 households, out of which 22.8% had children under the age of 18 living with them, 34.3% were married couples living together, 12.6% had a female householder with no husband present, and 50.1% were non-families. 40.1% of all households were made up of individuals, and 10.1% had someone living alone who was 65 years of age or older. The average household size was 2.05 and the average family size was 2.78.

In the township the population was spread out, with 20.9% under the age of 18, 11.3% from 18 to 24, 32.9% from 25 to 44, 20.8% from 45 to 64, and 14.1% who were 65 years of age or older. The median age was 35 years. For every 100 females, there were 87.7 males. For every 100 females age 18 and over, there were 83.1 males.

The median income for a household in the township was $41,017, and the median income for a family was $50,632. Males had a median income of $37,124 versus $28,829 for females. The per capita income for the township was $22,885. About 5.2% of families and 7.5% of the population were below the poverty line, including 8.2% of those under age 18 and 4.7% of those age 65 or over.

== Government ==
Lansing Township operates under the charter township form of government, which has a township board of trustees vested with legislative and executive powers and duties. The board consists of an elected township supervisor, clerk and treasurer with four additional trustees.

== Education ==
School districts covering sections of the township include Lansing Public School District and Waverly Community Schools.

Parts of Michigan State University extend into this township. The Dairy Cattle Teaching and Research Center and the Horse Teaching and Research Center are located in this township.
