= Delta Charter Township, Michigan =

- Charter township
- Seal

- Location within the state of Michigan
- Coordinates: 42°43′37″N 84°39′36″W
- Country: United States
- State: Michigan
- County: Eaton
- Settled: 1837
- Organization: 1842

Government
  - Type: Supervisor-Board of Trustees
  - Supervisor: Fonda J. Brewer (D)

Area
  - Total: 33.21 sq mi (86.0 km^{2})
  - Land: 32.46 sq mi (84.1 km^{2})
  - Water: 0.74 sq mi (1.9 km^{2})
- Elevation: 860 ft (262 m)

Population (2020)
  - Total: 33,119
  - Density: 1,003.6/sq mi (387.5/km^{2})
- Time zone: UTC-5 (EST)
  - Summer (DST): UTC-4 (EDT)
- ZIP code: 48917 (Lansing
- Area code: 517
- FIPS code: 26-21520
- GNIS feature ID: 1626175
- Website: http://www.deltami.gov/

Delta Township (formally named the Charter Township of Delta) is a charter township in Eaton County in the U.S. state of Michigan. As of the 2020 census, it had a population of 33,119 making it the most populous municipality in Eaton County. The township operates its own fire department, but contracts with the Eaton County Sheriff Department for police protection. The township is a major community in metropolitan Lansing.

== Communities ==
- Delta Mills is an unincorporated community within the north-central of township on the Grand River immediately north of the Webster Street bridge. It lies between the cities of Grand Ledge on the west and Lansing on the east. It was first settled in 1836 and platted as "Grand River City" in 1841, but never incorporated. The community became known as Delta Mills due to the grist mill located there and the township.
- Delta Center is an unincorporated community located near the center of the township at Canal Street and St. Joseph Highway. It was the original location of the township hall built in the 1870s and serving until 1955 when it was moved up Canal where it intersects with Saginaw Highway.
- Millett (originally Millett's Station) is a populated place within the southwest corner of the township and located east of Creyts Road, west of Waverly Road, and along Lansing Road. The old Millett School building, the former Grand Trunk Western's Millett railroad depot and the Woldumar Nature Center are located there. The village was platted in 1874 by former Eaton County sheriff Silas Millett.
- Waverly is a Census-designated place (CDP) used for statistical purposes and has no legal status as a municipality. The population was 23,925 at the 2010 census, containing most of the urbanized population of the township.

== Geography ==
According to the United States Census Bureau, the township has a total area of 33.2 square miles (86 km^{2}), of which 32.4 square miles (84 km^{2}) is land and 0.7 square miles (1.8 km^{2}) (2.30%) is water.

Since 2000, the township has entered into four 425 Agreements with the neighboring city of Lansing, which has resulted in the temporary transfer of 1.76 sq mi (4.6 km^{2}) of land to Lansing. The agreements facilitated the construction of the Lansing Delta Township Assembly Plant as well as three auto suppliers.

== Demographics ==
Historical population
Census	Pop.	Note	%±
1960	7,627		—
1970	17,396		128.1%
1980	23,822		36.9%
1990	26,129		9.7%
2000	29,682		13.6%
2010	32,408		9.2%
2020	33,119		2.2%
2021 (est.)	33,070		−0.1%
U.S. Decennial Census

=== 2010 ===
As of the census of 2010, there were 32,408 people, 14,201 households, and 8,572 families residing in the township. The population density was 998.3 inhabitants per square mile (385.4/km^{2}). There were 15,186 housing units at an average density of 467.8 per square mile (180.6/km^{2}). The racial makeup of the township was 76.8% White, 11.6% African American, 0.5% Native American, 3.8% Asian, 0.0% Pacific Islander, 1.9% from other races, and 3.6% from two or more races. Hispanic or Latino of any race were 6.2% of the population.

=== 2000 ===
There were 12,559 households, out of which 28.4% had children under the age of 18 living with them, 52.1% were married couples living together, 9.4% had a female householder with no husband present, and 35.7% were non-families. 29.4% of all households were made up of individuals, and 9.0% had someone living alone who was 65 years of age or older. The average household size was 2.33 and the average family size was 2.92.

In the township the population was spread out, with 22.9% under the age of 18, 9.5% from 18 to 24, 28.0% from 25 to 44, 26.5% from 45 to 64, and 13.1% who were 65 years of age or older. The median age was 38 years. For every 100 females, there were 89.5 males. For every 100 females age 18 and over, there were 86.3 males.

The median income for a household in the township was $52,711, and the median income for a family was $65,429. Males had a median income of $48,520 versus $32,776 for females. The per capita income for the township was $27,048. About 3.8% of families and 5.0% of the population were below the poverty line, including 5.8% of those under age 18 and 6.4% of those age 65 or over.

== Transportation ==
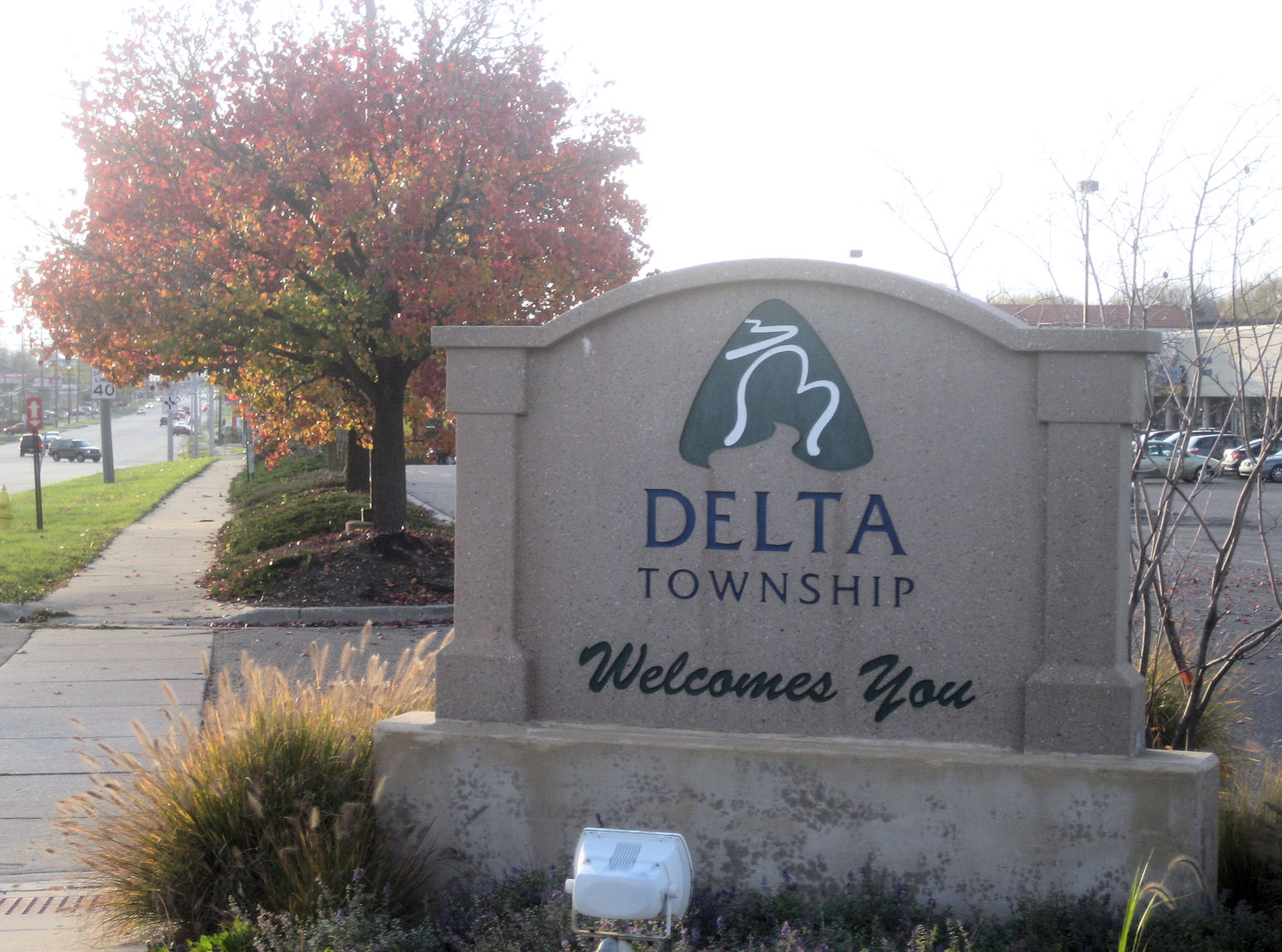
Delta Charter Township welcome sign along M-43.

Three major Interstate Highways pass through Delta Charter Township and include Interstate 69 (I-69), I-96, and I-496. Saginaw Highway (M-43) is the major thoroughfare with many commercial businesses located along the road.

Eaton County Transportation Authority (EATRAN) and the Capital Area Transportation Authority (CATA) both provide public transportation services to the area. Amtrak provides intercity passenger service, in nearby East Lansing, on the Chicago to Port Huron Blue Water line.

Class one rail freight service is provided by Canadian National Railway (CN), operating out of a rail yard along Snow Road, Mt. Hope Highway and Lansing Road. The yard mainly handles automobile, coal, grain, and lumber loads for local industries.
