= 1973 San Diego Chargers season =

1973 NFL team season

- Owner: Eugene V. Klein
- General manager: Harland Svare
- Head coach: Harland Svare (8 games); Ron Waller (interim)
- Home stadium: San Diego Stadium

Results
- Record: 2–11–1
- Division place: 4th AFC West
- All-Pros: None
- Pro Bowlers: None

The 1973 San Diego Chargers season was the franchise's fourth season in the National Football League (NFL), and its 14th overall.

The Chargers were coming off a season that ended with a 4–9–1 record. Although he was offered a five-year contract toward the end of the previous season, 1973 was Harland Svare's final season as head coach; he stepped down in early November at 1–6–1, and special teams coach Ron Waller led the team for the final six games.

Veteran quarterback Johnny Unitas was acquired in a trade with the Baltimore Colts, but at age forty he was a shell of his former greatness. In October, Unitas was benched in favor of rookie Dan Fouts, their third-round pick in that year's draft. Fouts played fifteen seasons for the Chargers, and was inducted into the Pro Football Hall of Fame in 1993.

== Offseason ==
=== NFL draft ===
1973 San Diego Chargers draft
Round	Pick	Player	Position	College	Notes
1	25	Johnny Rodgers	Wide receiver	Nebraska	Joined the Chargers in 1977 after initially playing in the Canadian Football League
3	64	Dan Fouts * ^{†}	Quarterback	Oregon	
4	84	Jim Thaxton	Tight end	Tennessee State	
4	97	Bill Singletary	Linebacker	Temple	
5	123	Willie McGee	Wide receiver	Alcorn State	
5	125	Jon Knoble	Linebacker	Weber State	
6	135	Marvin Roberts	Center	Michigan State	
9	214	Tab Bennett	Linebacker	Illinois	
10	239	Cliff Burnett	Defensive end	Montana	
11	268	Jay Douglas	Center	Memphis	
12	293	Lynn Ahrens	Tackle	Eastern Montana	
13	318	Alfred Reese	Running back	Tennessee State	
14	343	Tony Adams	Quarterback	Utah State	
15	372	Gary Parris	Tight end	Florida State	
16	397	Joe Petty	Defensive back	Arizona State University	
17	422	Barry Darrow	Tackle	Montana	
Made roster † Pro Football Hall of Fame * Made at least one Pro Bowl during career

== Roster ==
1973 San Diego Chargers roster
Quarterbacks (QB): 13 Wayne Clark; 14 Dan Fouts; 19 Johnny Unitas; Running backs (RB): 37 Cid Edwards; 20 Mike Garrett; 38 Robert Holmes; 26 Clinton Jones; 35 Bob Thomas; Wide receivers (WR): 27 Gary Garrison; 81 Ron Holliday; 25 Jerry LeVias; 28 Willie McGee; Tight ends (TE): 88 Pettis Norman; 80 Gary Parris; 86 Jim Thaxton	Offensive linemen (OL): 61 Al Dennis G; 52 Jay Douglas C; 69 Ira Gordon T; 55 Carl Mauck C; 76 Terry Owens T; 78 Walt Sweeney G; 70 Russ Washington T; 62 Ralph Wenzel G; 63 Doug Wilkerson G; Defensive linemen (DL): 87 Lionel Aldridge DE; 79 Coy Bacon DE/DT; 64 Dave Costa DT; 77 Ron East DT; 75 Deacon Jones DE; 51 Pete Lazetich DE; 71 Cal Snowden DE; 68 Greg Wojcik DT	Linebackers (LB): 54 Carl Gersbach MLB; 66 Rick Redman OLB; 57 Floyd Rice OLB; 53 Mel Rogers OLB; 82 Tim Rossovich MLB; 58 Mike Stratton OLB; Defensive backs (DB): 40 Joe Beauchamp FS; 45 Reggie Berry CB; 39 Lenny Dunlap CB; 44 Chris Fletcher FS; 24 Bob Howard CB; 30 Bryant Salter SS/FS; 48 Ron Smith SS; Special teams (ST): 29 Dennis Partee P; 15 Ray Wersching K	Reserve: 56 Ray White LB (IR); Rookies in italics

== Preseason ==
Week	Date	Opponent	Result	Record	Venue	Attendance
1	August 4	New York Giants	L 3–28	0–1	San Diego Stadium	
2	August 11	St. Louis Cardinals	L 13–17	0–2	San Diego Stadium	
3	August 19	at San Francisco 49ers	L 7–19	0–3	Candlestick Park	
4	August 25	Philadelphia Eagles	W 24–17	1–3	San Diego Stadium	
5	August 31	at Los Angeles Rams	L 17–30	1–4	Los Angeles Memorial Coliseum	
6	September 8	Minnesota Vikings	L 16–24	1–5	San Diego Stadium	

== Regular season ==
=== Schedule ===
Week	Date	Opponent	Result	Record	Venue	Attendance	Recap
1	September 16	at Washington Redskins	**L** 0–38	0–1	RFK Stadium	53,589	Recap
2	September 23	Buffalo Bills	**W** 34–7	1–1	San Diego Stadium	47,588	Recap
3	September 30	Cincinnati Bengals	**L** 13–20	1–2	San Diego Stadium	46,733	Recap
4	October 7	at Pittsburgh Steelers	**L** 21–38	1–3	Three Rivers Stadium	48,795	Recap
5	October 14	**Oakland Raiders**	**L** 17–27	1–4	San Diego Stadium	50,672	Recap
6	October 21	Atlanta Falcons	**L** 0–41	1–5	San Diego Stadium	41,527	Recap
7	October 28	at Cleveland Browns	**T** 16–16	1–5–1	Cleveland Municipal Stadium	68,244	Recap
8	November 4	**Kansas City Chiefs**	**L** 0–19	1–6–1	San Diego Stadium	50,234	Recap
9	November 11	at **Denver Broncos**	**L** 19–30	1–7–1	Mile High Stadium	51,034	Recap
10	November 18	New Orleans Saints	**W** 17–14	2–7–1	San Diego Stadium	34,848	Recap
11	November 25	at **Oakland Raiders**	**L** 3–31	2–8–1	Oakland–Alameda County Coliseum	40,195	Recap
12	December 2	at New England Patriots	**L** 14–30	2–9–1	Schaefer Stadium	58,150	Recap
13	December 9	**Denver Broncos**	**L** 28–42	2–10–1	San Diego Stadium	44,954	Recap
14	December 16	at **Kansas City Chiefs**	**L** 6–33	2–11–1	Arrowhead Stadium	43,755	Recap
Note: Intra-division opponents are in **bold** text.

=== Game summaries ===
==== Week 1: at Washington Redskins ====
Week One: San Diego Chargers at Washington Redskins – Game summary

Quarter	1	2	3	4	Total
Chargers	0	0	0	0	**0**
**Redskins**	21	0	7	10	**38**

at Robert F. Kennedy Memorial Stadium, Washington, D.C.

- Date: September 16
- Game time: 1:00 p.m. EDT
- Game weather: 73 °F (22.8 °C), relative humidity 59%, wind 6 mph
- Game attendance: 53,589
- Referee: Norm Schachter
- Box score

Game information

**First quarter**

- WAS – Verlon Biggs 2-yard fumble return (Curt Knight kick), 9:03. Redskins 7–0.
- WAS – Larry Brown 1-yard run (Curt Knight kick), 5:08. Redskins 14–0. **Drive: 3 plays, 22 yards, 0:53.**
- WAS – Brig Owens 36-yard fumble return (Curt Knight kick), 0:57. Redskins 21–0.

**Second quarter**

- No scoring plays.

**Third quarter**

- WAS – Charley Taylor 32-yard pass from Billy Kilmer (Curt Knight kick), 11:07. Redskins 28–0. **Drive: 7 plays, 80 yards, 3:53.**

**Fourth quarter**

- WAS – Curt Knight 19-yard field goal, 14:09. Redskins 31–0. **Drive: 4 plays, 3 yards, 0:51.**
- WAS – Frank Grant 12-yard pass from Billy Kilmer (Curt Knight kick), 9:50. Redskins 38–0. **Drive: 5 plays, 52 yards, 3:15.**

**Top passers**

- SDG – Johnny Unitas – 6/17, 55 yards, 3 INT
- WAS – Billy Kilmer – 10/18, 129 yards, 2 TD

**Top rushers**

- SDG – Cid Edwards – 14 rushes, 63 yards
- WAS – Duane Thomas – 12 rushes, 30 yards

**Top receivers**

- SDG – Gary Garrison – 2 receptions, 36 yards
- WAS – Charley Taylor – 3 receptions, 60 yards, TD

==== Week 2: vs. Buffalo Bills ====
Week Two: Buffalo Bills at San Diego Chargers – Game summary

Quarter	1	2	3	4	Total
Bills	0	7	0	0	**7**
**Chargers**	7	7	14	6	**34**

at San Diego Stadium, San Diego, California

- Date: September 23
- Game time: 1:00 p.m. PDT
- Game weather: 67 °F (19.4 °C), relative humidity 71%, wind 10 mph
- Game attendance: 47,588
- Referee: Jack Reader
- Box score

Game information

**First quarter**

- SDG – Ron Smith 72-yard punt return (Ray Wersching kick), 5:09. Chargers 7–0.

**Second quarter**

- BUF – O. J. Simpson 6-yard run (John Leypoldt kick), 9:50. Tied 7–7. **Drive: 6 plays, 53 yards, 1:22.**
- SDG – Robert Holmes 1-yard run (Ray Wersching kick), 6:33. Chargers 14–7. **Drive: 9 plays, 67 yards, 3:17.**

**Third quarter**

- SDG – Gary Garrison 26-yard pass from Johnny Unitas (Ray Wersching kick), 12:31. Chargers 21–7. **Drive: 2 plays, 27 yards, 0:44.**
- SDG – Jim Thaxton 12-yard pass from Johnny Unitas (Ray Wersching kick), 0:11. Chargers 28–8. **Drive: 10 plays, 80 yards, 4:53.**

**Fourth quarter**

- SDG – Robert Holmes 4-yard run (kick blocked), 8:16. Chargers 34–7. **Drive: 2 plays, 35 yards, 0:54.**

**Top passers**

- BUF – Dennis Shaw – 7/15, 106 yards, 2 INT
- SDG – Johnny Unitas – 10/18, 175 yards, 2 TD

**Top rushers**

- BUF – O. J. Simpson – 22 rushes, 103 yards, TD
- SDG – Clint Jones – 7 rushes, 42 yards

**Top receivers**

- BUF – J. D. Hill – 7 receptions, 118 yards
- SDG – Dave Williams – 5 receptions, 86 yards

==== Week 3: vs. Cincinnati Bengals ====
Week Three: Cincinnati Bengals at San Diego Chargers – Game summary

Quarter	1	2	3	4	Total
**Bengals**	7	6	7	0	**20**
Chargers	3	0	0	10	**13**

at San Diego Stadium, San Diego, California

- Date: September 30
- Game time: 1:00 p.m. PDT
- Game weather: 67 °F (19.4 °C), relative humidity 70%, wind 9 mph
- Game attendance: 46,733
- Referee: Chuck Heberling
- Box score

Game information

**First quarter**

- SDG – Ray Wersching 39-yard field goal, 7:08. Chargers 3–0. **Drive: 4 plays, -5 yards, 2:00.**
- CIN – Essex Johnson 78-yard pass from Ken Anderson (Horst Muhlmann kick), 0:16. Bengals 7–3. **Drive: 3 plays, 80 yards, 1:26.**

**Second quarter**

- CIN – Boobie Clark 1-yard run (kick failed), 11:07. Bengals 13–3. **Drive: 5 plays, 36 yards, 2:13.**

**Third quarter**

- CIN – Essex Johnson 38-yard pass from Ken Anderson (Horst Muhlmann kick), 10:55. Bengals 20–3. **Drive: 7 plays, 86 yards, 4:05.**

**Fourth quarter**

- SDG – Ray Wersching 13-yard field goal, 12:07. Bengals 20–6. **Drive: 13 plays, 63 yards, 6:37.**
- SDG – Bob Thomas 8-yard pass from Johnny Unitas (Ray Wersching kick), 6:31. Bengals 20–13. **Drive: 4 plays, 62 yards, 1:01.**

**Top passers**

- CIN – Ken Anderson – 10/17, 222 yards, 2 TD
- SDG – Johnny Unitas – 15/31, 215 yards, TD, 2 INT

**Top rushers**

- CIN – Essex Johnson – 21 rushes, 121 yards
- SDG – Mike Garrett – 21 rushes, 79 yards

**Top receivers**

- CIN – Essex Johnson – 2 receptions, 116 yards, 2 TD
- SDG – Gary Garrison – 4 receptions, 117 yards

==== Week 4: at Pittsburgh Steelers ====
Week Four: San Diego Chargers at Pittsburgh Steelers – Game summary

Quarter	1	2	3	4	Total
Chargers	0	0	0	21	**21**
**Steelers**	17	21	0	0	**38**

at Three Rivers Stadium, Pittsburgh, Pennsylvania

- Date: October 7
- Game time: 1:00 p.m. EDT
- Game weather: 60 °F (15.6 °C), relative humidity 63%, wind 7 mph
- Game attendance: 48,795
- Referee: Pat Haggerty
- Box score

Game information

**First quarter**

- PIT – Ron Shanklin 12-yard pass from Terry Bradshaw (Roy Gerela kick), 10:22. Steelers 7–0. **Drive: 8 plays, 67 yards, 4:38.**
- PIT – Terry Bradshaw 1-yard run (Roy Gerela kick), 5:08. Steelers 14–0. **Drive: 11 plays, 50 yards, 4:35.**
- PIT – Roy Gerela 38-yard field goal, 0:31. Steelers 17–0.

**Second quarter**

- PIT – Steve Davis 1-yard run (Roy Gerela kick), 13:16. Steelers 24–0. **Drive: 4 plays, 1 yard, 1:26.**
- PIT – Mike Wagner blocked punt recovery in end zone (Roy Gerela kick), 8:43. Steelers 31–0.
- PIT – Ron Shanklin 37-yard pass from Terry Hanratty (Roy Gerela kick), 5:14. Steelers 38–0. **Drive: 2 plays, 38 yards, 0:50.**

**Third quarter**

- No scoring plays.

**Fourth quarter**

- SDG – Jerry LeVias 13-yard pass from Dan Fouts (Ray Wersching kick), 14:50. Steelers 38–7. **Drive: 12 plays, 73 yards, 5:56.**
- SDG – Clint Jones 3-yard run (Ray Wersching kick), 12:34. Steelers 38–14. **Drive: 6 plays, 90 yards, 1:00.**
- SDG – Robert Holmes 1-yard run (Ray Wersching kick), 3:49. Steelers 38–21. **Drive: 3 plays, 22 yards, 1:38.**

**Top passers**

- SDG – Dan Fouts – 11/21, 174 yards, TD, INT
- PIT – Terry Bradshaw – 7/16, 99 yards, TD, INT

**Top rushers**

- SDG – Cid Edwards – 13 rushes, 94 yards
- PIT – Preston Pearson – 6 rushes, 64 yards

**Top receivers**

- SDG – Clint Jones – 2 receptions, 51 yards
- PIT – Frank Lewis – 4 receptions, 61 yards

==== Week 5: vs. Oakland Raiders ====
Week Five: Oakland Raiders at San Diego Chargers – Game summary

Quarter	1	2	3	4	Total
**Raiders**	0	6	7	14	**27**
Chargers	3	0	14	0	**17**

at San Diego Stadium, San Diego, California

- Date: October 14
- Game time: 1:00 p.m. PDT
- Game weather: 66 °F (18.9 °C), relative humidity 71%, wind 8 mph
- Game attendance: 50,672
- Referee: John McDonough
- Box score

Game information

**First quarter**

- SDG – Ray Wersching 27-yard field goal, 6:31. Chargers 3–0. **Drive: 10 plays, 52 yards, 4:20.**

**Second quarter**

- OAK – George Blanda 18-yard field goal, 7:30. Tied 3–3. **Drive: 6 plays, 23 yards, 1:12.**
- OAK – George Blanda 15-yard field goal, 0:07. Raiders 6–3. **Drive: 8 plays, 35 yards, 1:34.**

**Third quarter**

- SDG – Jim Thaxton 20-yard pass from Dan Fouts (Ray Wersching kick), 11:42. Chargers 10–6. **Drive: 5 plays, 21 yards, 1:41.**
- OAK – Cliff Branch 54-yard pass from Ken Stabler (George Blanda kick), 8:51. Raiders 13–10. **Drive: 6 plays, 80 yards, 2:51.**
- SDG – Jerry LeVias 36-yard pass from Dan Fouts (Ray Wersching kick), 0:21. Chargers 17–13. **Drive: 14 plays, 80 yards, 8:30.**

**Fourth quarter**

- OAK – Marv Hubbard 1-yard run (George Blanda kick), 9:54. Raiders 20–17. **Drive: 12 plays, 80 yards, 5:27.**
- OAK – Bob Moore 26-yard pass from Ken Stabler (George Blanda kick), 9:01. Raiders 27–17. **Drive: 2 plays, 28 yards, 0:43.**

**Top passers**

- OAK – Ken Stabler – 13/22, 193 yards, 2 TD, INT
- SDG – Dan Fouts – 12/30, 183 yards, 2 TD, INT

**Top rushers**

- OAK – Marv Hubbard – 16 rushes, 76 yards, TD
- SDG – Robert Holmes – 6 rushes, 36 yards

**Top receivers**

- OAK – Cliff Branch – 2 receptions, 71 yards, TD
- SDG – Jim Thaxton – 4 receptions, 63 yards, TD

==== Week 6: vs. Atlanta Falcons ====
Week Six: Atlanta Falcons at San Diego Chargers – Game summary

Quarter	1	2	3	4	Total
**Falcons**	7	10	10	14	**41**
Chargers	0	0	0	0	**0**

at San Diego Stadium, San Diego, California

- Date: October 21
- Game time: 1:00 p.m. PDT
- Game weather: 65 °F (18.3 °C), relative humidity 73%, wind 10 mph
- Game attendance: 41,527
- Box score

Game information

**First quarter**

- ATL – Art Malone 8-yard run (Nick Mike-Mayer kick), 6:31. Falcons 7–0.

**Second quarter**

- ATL – Nick Mike-Mayer 43-yard field goal, 7:30. Falcons 10–0.
- ATL – Dave Hampton 4-yard run (Nick Mike-Mayer kick), 0:07. Falcons 17–0.

**Third quarter**

- ATL – Nick Mike-Mayer 12-yard field goal, 7:30. Falcons 20–0.
- ATL – Dave Hampton 2-yard run (Nick Mike-Mayer kick), 0:07. Falcons 27–0.

**Fourth quarter**

- ATL – Eddie Ray 2-yard run (Nick Mike-Mayer kick), 0:07. Falcons 34–0.
- ATL – Eddie Ray 12-yard run (Nick Mike-Mayer kick), 0:07. Falcons 41–0.

**Top passers**

- ATL – Bob Lee – 9/17, 146 yards, INT
- SDG – Dan Fouts – 13/36, 99 yards, 4 INT

**Top rushers**

- ATL – Dave Hampton – 19 rushes, 76 yards, 2 TD
- SDG – Clint Jones – 10 rushes, 32 yards

**Top receivers**

- ATL – Ken Burrow – 2 receptions, 59 yards
- SDG – Ron Holliday – 3 receptions, 44 yards

==== Week 7: at Cleveland Browns ====
Week Seven: San Diego Chargers at Cleveland Browns – Game summary

Quarter	1	2	3	4	Total
Chargers	0	10	3	3	**16**
Browns	0	3	3	10	**16**

at Cleveland Municipal Stadium, Cleveland, Ohio

- Date: October 28
- Game time: 1:00 p.m. EST
- Game weather: 54 °F (12.2 °C), relative humidity 86%, wind 11 mph
- Game attendance: 68,244
- Referee: Tom Bell
- Box score

Game information

**First quarter**

- No scoring plays.

**Second quarter**

- SDG – Ray Wersching 11-yard field goal, 8:21. Chargers 3–0. **Drive: 9 plays, 42 yards, 5:21.**
- CLE – Don Cockroft 40-yard field goal, 5:35. Tied 3–3. **Drive: 6 plays, 12 yards, 2:46.**
- SDG – Mike Garrett 1-yard pass from Dan Fouts (Ron Holliday run), 0:10. Chargers 10–3. **Drive: 10 plays, 47 yards, 3:29.**

**Third quarter**

- CLE – Don Cockroft 17-yard field goal, 4:49. Chargers 10–6. **Drive: 19 plays, 90 yards, 10:11.**
- SDG – Ray Wersching 8-yard field goal, 1:30. Chargers 13–6. **Drive: 6 plays, 72 yards, 3:19.**

**Fourth quarter**

- CLE – Don Cockroft 42-yard field goal, 11:02. Chargers 13–9. **Drive: 6 plays, 19 yards, 2:22.**
- CLE – Greg Pruitt 7-yard run (Don Cockroft kick), 8:26. Browns 16–13. **Drive: 2 plays, 9 yards, 0:55.**
- SDG – Ray Wersching 16-yard field goal, 0:30. Tied 16–16. **Drive: 6 plays, 69 yards, 1:46.**

**Top passers**

- SDG – Dan Fouts – 8/16, 135 yards, TD, INT
- CLE – Mike Phipps – 10/21, 92 yards, 2 INT

**Top rushers**

- SDG – Mike Garrett – 19 rushes, 130 yards
- CLE – Billy Lefear – 7 rushes, 47 yards

**Top receivers**

- SDG – Willie McGee – 1 reception, 50 yards
- CLE – Billy Lefear – 2 receptions, 24 yards

==== Week 8: vs. Kansas City Chiefs ====
Week Eight: Kansas City Chiefs at San Diego Chargers – Game summary

Quarter	1	2	3	4	Total
**Chiefs**	6	3	3	7	**19**
Chargers	0	0	0	0	**0**

at San Diego Stadium, San Diego, California

- Date: November 4
- Game time: 1:00 p.m. PST
- Game weather: 61 °F (16.1 °C), relative humidity 62%, wind 6 mph
- Game attendance: 50,234
- Referee: Fred Swearingen
- Box score

Game information

**First quarter**

- KAN – Ed Podolak 5-yard run (kick blocked), 2:35. Chiefs 6–0. **Drive: 11 plays, 79 yards, 6:51.**

**Second quarter**

- KAN – Jan Stenerud 31-yard field goal, 7:58. Chiefs 9–0. **Drive: 7 plays, 67 yards, 4:27.**

**Third quarter**

- KAN – Jan Stenerud 36-yard field goal, 8:32. Chiefs 12–0. **Drive: 9 plays, 20 yards, 4:42.**

**Fourth quarter**

- KAN – Morris Stroud 39-yard pass from Mike Livingston (Jan Stenerud kick), 5:47. Chiefs 19–0. **Drive: 2 plays, 39 yards, 0:11.**

**Top passers**

- KAN – Mike Livingston – 13/22, 193 yards, 2 TD, INT
- SDG – Dan Fouts – 11/29, 128 yards, 3 INT

**Top rushers**

- KAN – Wendell Hayes – 13 rushes, 90 yards
- SDG – Mike Garrett – 14 rushes, 51 yards

**Top receivers**

- KAN – Pettis Norman – 3 receptions, 62 yards
- SDG – Morris Stroud – 2 receptions, 61 yards, TD

==== Week 9: at Denver Broncos ====
Week Nine: San Diego Chargers at Denver Broncos – Game summary

Quarter	1	2	3	4	Total
Chargers	3	13	0	3	**19**
**Broncos**	10	0	6	14	**30**

at Mile High Stadium, Denver, Colorado

- Date: November 11
- Game time: 2:00 p.m. CST
- Game weather: 52 °F (11.1 °C), relative humidity 41%, wind 7 mph
- Game attendance: 51,034
- Referee: Jim Tunney
- Box score

Game information

**First quarter**

- DEN – Floyd Little 1-yard run (Jim Turner kick), 14:32. Broncos 7–0. **Drive: 2 plays, 12 yards, 0:09.**
- DEN – Jim Turner 39 yard field goal, 10:09. Broncos 10–0. **Drive: 7 plays, 33 yards, 3:12.**
- SDG – Ray Wersching 26-yard field goal, 0:00. Broncos 10–3. **Drive: 17 plays, 58 yards, 10:09.**

**Second quarter**

- SDG – Coy Bacon 80-yard interception return (kick blocked), 5:45. Broncos 10–9.
- SDG – Robert Holmes 18-yard run (Ray Wersching kick), 1:54. Chargers 16–10. **Drive: 4 plays, 35 yards, 2:13.**

**Third quarter**

- DEN – Gene Washington 20-yard pass from Charley Johnson (kick blocked), 5:12. Tied 16–16. **Drive: 12 plays, 62 yards, 6:24.**

**Fourth quarter**

- DEN – Riley Odoms 14-yard pass from Charley Johnson (Jim Turner kick), 10:01. Broncos 23–16. **Drive: 7 plays, 80 yards, 3:50.**
- SDG – Ray Wersching 38-yard field goal, 4:25. Broncos 23–19. **Drive: 10 plays, 43 yards, 5:36.**
- DEN – Floyd Little 1-yard run (Jim Turner kick), 0:46. Broncos 30–19. **Drive: 6 plays, 23 yards, 2:32.**

**Top passers**

- SDG – Wayne Clark – 12/21, 122 yards
- DEN – Charley Johnson – 16/29, 234 yards, 2 TD, INT

**Top rushers**

- SDG – Mike Garrett – 12 rushes, 47 yards
- DEN – Floyd Little – 22 rushes, 109 yards, 2 TD

**Top receivers**

- SDG – Jerry LeVias – 6 reception, 89 yards
- DEN – Floyd Little – 5 receptions, 76 yards

==== Week 10: vs. New Orleans Saints ====
Week Ten: New Orleans Saints at San Diego Chargers – Game summary

Quarter	1	2	3	4	Total
Saints	0	0	7	7	**14**
**Chargers**	0	10	0	7	**17**

at San Diego Stadium, San Diego, California

- Date: November 18
- Game time: 1:00 p.m. PST
- Game weather: 61 °F (16.1 °C), relative humidity 83%, wind 12 mph
- Game attendance: 34,848
- Referee: Pat Haggerty
- Box score

Game information

**First quarter**

- No scoring plays.

**Second quarter**

- SDG – Ray Wersching 28-yard field goal, 2:51. Chargers 3–0. **Drive: 5 plays, 60 yards, 1:40.**
- SDG – Ron Smith 84-yard punt return (Ray Wersching kick), 1:18. Chargers 10–0.

**Third quarter**

- NO – Jubilee Dunbar 9-yard pass from Archie Manning (Bill McClard kick), 1:17. Chargers 10–7. **Drive: 6 plays, 57 yards, 3:30.**

**Fourth quarter**

- SDG – Robert Holmes 1-yard run (Ray Wersching kick), 8:20. Chargers 17–7.
- NO – John Beasley 14-yard pass from Archie Manning (Bill McClard kick), 0:58. Chargers 17–14.

**Top passers**

- NO – Archie Manning – 21/37, 224 yards, 2 TD, INT
- SDG – Wayne Clark – 8/20, 109 yards, INT

**Top rushers**

- NO – Jess Phillips – 16 rushes, 43 yards
- SDG – Cid Edwards – 12 rushes, 95 yards

**Top receivers**

- NO – John Beasley – 12 receptions, 127 yards, TD
- SDG – Jerry LeVias – 2 receptions, 63 yards

==== Week 11: at Oakland Raiders ====
Week Eleven: San Diego Chargers at Oakland Raiders – Game summary

Quarter	1	2	3	4	Total
Chargers	3	0	0	0	**3**
**Raiders**	7	17	7	0	**31**

at Oakland-Alameda County Coliseum, Oakland, California

- Date: November 25
- Game time: 1:00 p.m. PST
- Game weather: 49 °F (9.4 °C), relative humidity 77%, wind 12 mph
- Game attendance: 40,195
- Referee: Fred Silva
- Box score

Game information

**First quarter**

- OAK – George Atkinson 59-yard defensive fumble return (George Blanda kick), 10:22. Raiders 7–0.
- SDG – Dennis Partee 14-yard field goal, 3:27. Raiders 7–3. **Drive: 12 plays, 65 yards, 6:47.**

**Second quarter**

- OAK – George Blanda 34-yard field goal, 12:15. Raiders 10–3. **Drive: 12 plays, 42 yards, 6:02.**
- OAK – Charlie Smith 7-yard run (George Blanda kick), 3:54. Raiders 17–3. **Drive: 5 plays, 69 yards, 1:42.**
- OAK – Fred Biletnikoff 16-yard pass from Ken Stabler (George Blanda kick), 1:44. Raiders 24–3. **Drive: 1 play, 16 yards, 0:05.**

**Third quarter**

- OAK – Bob Moore 1-yard pass from Ken Stabler (George Blanda kick), 3:22. Raiders 31–3. **Drive: 4 plays, 13 yards, 1:28.**

**Fourth quarter**

- No scoring plays.

**Top passers**

- SDG – Wayne Clark – 6/15, 183 yards, INT
- OAK – Ken Stabler – 12/22, 165 yards, 2 TD, INT

**Top rushers**

- SDG – Cid Edwards – 16 rushes, 81 yards
- OAK – Charlie Smith – 14 rushes, 66 yards, TD

**Top receivers**

- SDG – Clint Jones – 2 receptions, 47 yards
- OAK – Mike Siani – 4 receptions, 90 yards

==== Week 12: at New England Patriots ====
Week Twelve: San Diego Chargers at New England Patriots – Game summary

Quarter	1	2	3	4	Total
Chargers	0	14	0	0	**14**
**Patriots**	3	13	7	7	**30**

at Schaefer Stadium, Foxborough, Massachusetts

- Date: December 2
- Game time: 1:00 p.m. EST
- Game weather: 33 °F (0.6 °C), relative humidity 47%, wind 13 mph, wind chill 23
- Game attendance: 58,150
- Referee: John McDonough
- Box score

Game information

**First quarter**

- NE – Jeff White 11-yard field goal, 1:06. Patriots 3–0. **Drive: 9 plays, 47 yards, 4:45.**

**Second quarter**

- SDG – Floyd Rice 51-yard fumble return (Dennis Partee kick), 11:48. Chargers 7–3.
- SDG – Robert Holmes 1-yard run (Dennis Partee kick), 4:27. Chargers 14–3. **Drive: 10 plays, 34 yards, 5:43.**
- NE – Mack Herron 92-yard kickoff return (kick blocked), 4:09. Chargers 14–9.
- NE – Randy Vataha 14-yard pass from Jim Plunkett (Jeff White kick), 0:21. Patriots 16–14. **Drive: 12 plays, 80 yards, 1:52.**

**Third quarter**

- NE – Jim Plunkett 1-yard run (Jeff White kick), 9:48. Patriots 23–14. **Drive: 10 plays, 69 yards, 5:12.**

**Fourth quarter**

- NE – Jim Plunkett 3-yard run (Jeff White kick), 7:16. Patriots 30–14. **Drive: 11 plays, 82 yards, 7:35.**

**Top passers**

- SDG – Wayne Clark – 5/8, 46 yards, INT
- NE – Jim Plunkett – 13/27, 186 yards, TD, 2 INT

**Top rushers**

- SDG – Cid Edwards – 11 rushes, 56 yards
- NE – John Tarver – 14 rushes, 76 yards

**Top receivers**

- SDG – Cid Edwards – 3 receptions, 24 yards
- NE – Reggie Rucker – 4 receptions, 55 yards

==== Week 13: vs. Denver Broncos ====
Week Thirteen: Denver Broncos at San Diego Chargers – Game summary

Quarter	1	2	3	4	Total
**Broncos**	7	13	19	3	**42**
Chargers	7	7	0	14	**28**

at San Diego Stadium, San Diego, California

- Date: December 9
- Game time: 1:00 p.m. PST
- Game weather: 63 °F (17.2 °C), relative humidity 34%, wind 5 mph
- Game attendance: 44,954
- Referee: Fred Wyant
- Box score

Game information

**First quarter**

- SDG – Robert Holmes 1-yard run (Dennis Partee kick), 5:03. Chargers 7–0. **Drive: 7 plays, 60 yards, 2:26.**
- DEN – Riley Odoms 24-yard pass from Charley Johnson (Jim Turner kick), 2:49. Tied 7–7. **Drive: 5 plays, 80 yards, 2:09.**

**Second quarter**

- DEN – Floyd Little 1-yard run (Jim Turner kick), 7:05. Broncos 14–7. **Drive: 8 plays, 69 yards, 5:10.**
- DEN – Jim Turner 25-yard field goal, 4:02. Broncos 17–7. **Drive: 5 plays, 17 yards.**
- SDG – Gary Garrison 11-yard pass from Dan Fouts (Dennis Partee kick), 3:03. Broncos 17–14. **Drive: 4 plays, 33 yards, 0:44.**
- DEN – Jim Turner 35-yard field goal, 0:49. Broncos 20–14. **Drive: 10 plays, 22 yards, 2:14.**

**Third quarter**

- DEN – Joe Dawkins 2-yard run (Jim Turner kick), 10:31. Broncos 27–14. **Drive: 8 plays, 61 yards, 3:35.**
- DEN – Jim Turner 15-yard field goal, 5:57. Broncos 30–14. **Drive: 9 plays, 35 yards, 3:02.**
- DEN – Safety, Ken Criter blocked punt through end zone, 4:13. Broncos 32–14.
- DEN – Haven Moses 15-yard pass from Charley Johnson (Jim Turner kick), 1:13. Broncos 39–14. **Drive: 7 plays, 47 yards, 2:47.**

**Fourth quarter**

- SDG – Cid Edwards 1-yard run (Dennis Partee kick), 12:44. Broncos 39–21. **Drive: 10 plays, 68 yards, 3:20.**
- SDG – Jerry LeVias 69 yard pass from Dan Fouts (Dennis Partee kick), 8:32. Broncos 39–28. **Drive: 1 play, 69 yards, 0:12.**
- DEN – Jim Turner 29-yard field goal, 2:19. Broncos 42–28. **Drive: 6 plays, 20 yards, 3:39.**

**Top passers**

- DEN – Charley Johnson – 15/26, 216 yards, 2 TD
- SDG – Dan Fouts – 13/31, 254 yards, 2 TD, 2 INT

**Top rushers**

- DEN – Floyd Little – 18 rushes, 88 yards, TD
- SDG – Robert Holmes – 7 rushes, 68 yards, TD

**Top receivers**

- DEN – Jerry Simmons – 1 reception, 53 yards
- SDG – Jerry LeVias – 5 receptions, 149 yards, TD

==== Week 14: at Kansas City Chiefs ====
Week Fourteen: San Diego Chargers at Kansas City Chiefs – Game summary

Quarter	1	2	3	4	Total
Chargers	3	0	3	0	**6**
**Chiefs**	10	3	10	10	**33**

at Arrowhead Stadium, Kansas City, Missouri

- Date: December 16
- Game time: 1:00 p.m. CST
- Game weather: 20 °F (−6.7 °C), relative humidity 73%, wind 11 mph, wind chill 8
- Game attendance: 43,755
- Box score

Game information

**First quarter**

- KAN – Ed Podolak 5-yard run (Jan Stenerud kick), 10:12. Chiefs 7–0. **Drive: 4 plays, 14 yards.**
- SDG – Ray Wersching 22-yard field goal, 5:04. Chiefs 7–3. **Drive: 11 plays, 60 yards, 5:08.**
- KAN – Jan Stenerud 45-yard field goal, 0:12. Chiefs 10–3. **Drive: 10 plays, 30 yards, 4:52.**

**Second quarter**

- KAN – Jan Stenerud 36-yard field goal, 11:59. Chiefs 13–3. **Drive: 4 plays, -2 yards.**

**Third quarter**

- KAN – Jan Stenerud 20-yard field goal, 12:03. Chiefs 16–3. **Drive: 5 plays, 23 yards, 1:58.**
- SDG – Ray Wersching 26-yard field goal, 9:44. Chiefs 16–6. **Drive: 7 plays, 37 yards, 2:19.**
- KAN – Jeff Kinney 5-yard run (Jan Stenerud kick), 3:06. Chiefs 23–6. **Drive: 12 plays, 80 yards, 6:38.**

**Fourth quarter**

- KAN – Wendell Hayes 2-yard run (Jan Stenerud kick), 7:17. Chiefs 30–6. **Drive: 7 plays, 30 yards, 4:46.**
- KAN – Jan Stenerud 27-yard field goal, 2:10. Chiefs 33–6. **Drive: 5 plays, 25 yards, 4:29.**

**Top passers**

- SDG – Dan Fouts – 9/14, 97 yards
- KAN – Mike Livingston – 11/22, 123 yards

**Top rushers**

- SDG – Robert Holmes – 9 rushes, 27 yards
- KAN – Ed Podolak – 13 rushes, 50 yards, TD

**Top receivers**

- SDG – Robert Holmes – 5 receptions, 50 yards
- KAN – Jeff Kinney – 2 receptions, 42 yards

=== Standings ===
AFC West
	W	L	T	PCT	DIV	CONF	PF	PA	STK
Oakland Raiders	9	4	1	.679	4–1–1	7–3–1	292	175	W4
Kansas City Chiefs	7	5	2	.571	4–2	6–4–1	231	192	W1
Denver Broncos	7	5	2	.571	3–2–1	7–2–1	354	296	L1
San Diego Chargers	2	11	1	.179	0–6	1–9–1	188	386	L4

== Awards ==
The AFC Pro Bowl squad did not feature any Chargers. Also, no Chargers were named All-Pro by the Associated Press, nor were any named the best in his Conference.
