= Jay Douglas =

Jay Douglas may refer to:

- Jay Douglas (musician)
- Jay Douglas (American football)

== See also ==
- Douglas Jay, British politician
