= 2002 NBA draft =

Basketball player selection

General information
- Sport: Basketball
- Date: June 26, 2002
- Location: The Theater at Madison Square Garden (New York City, New York)
- Network: TNT

Overview
- 57 total selections in 2 rounds
- League: NBA
- First selection: Yao Ming (Houston Rockets)
- Hall of Famers: 2: C Yao Ming; PF Amar'e Stoudemire

The 2002 NBA draft was held on June 17 2002, at The Theater at Madison Square Garden. In this draft, National Basketball Association (NBA) teams took turns selecting 57 amateur college basketball players and other first-time eligible players, such as players from non-North American leagues. This was the last draft that was broadcast on TNT, as ESPN obtained the rights for the 2003 draft via its incoming deal (which it retains to this day). The NBA announced that about 42 college and high school players, and five international players, had filed as early-entry candidates for the draft. The Chicago Bulls and the Golden State Warriors each had a 22.5% chance of acquiring the first pick, but the Houston Rockets, with just an 8.9% probability, won the NBA draft lottery on May 19. The Bulls and Warriors were second and third, respectively. As punishment for salary-cap violations during the 2001-02 season, the Minnesota Timberwolves forfeited their first-round draft pick.

The 2002 draft set a record of 17 international selections, with six of them coming in the first round.

Two months after the conclusion of his rookie season, number-two pick Jay Williams nearly lost his life in a motorcycle crash that shattered his pelvis, severed a main nerve in his leg and tore three ligaments in his left knee, including his ACL. Despite intense rehabilitation, Williams never played a game in the NBA again. When it became clear Williams could not return to the Bulls because of his injuries, the team waived him. The Bulls could have voided Williams' contract because it prohibited riding a motorcycle. However, the franchise bought out his contract for $3 million in 2004 instead of having him walk away with nothing.

The draft class was relatively weak outside of the top prospects. Several players selected early had promising careers that ended prematurely due to injury, including Yao Ming, Williams and Dajuan Wagner. Nevertheless, Yao was named a Hall of Famer—a selection predicated as much on his role in popularizing basketball in China as it was for his on-court play. Three players selected in this draft - including Yao, second-round pick Carlos Boozer and Rookie of the Year Amar'e Stoudemire - would be named to the All-NBA Team during their careers. Caron Butler was the only other player to become an All-Star. First-round pick Tayshaun Prince was also named to the NBA All-Defensive Team four times.

As of the end of the 2022–23 NBA season, Udonis Haslem was the last remaining active draft-eligible player from the 2002 class, though he went undrafted (he made his NBA debut the following season). He stopped playing after the 2022–23 season.

Nine of the players selected in this draft never played in an NBA game throughout their professional basketball careers. Three of those players were the sole selection of the draft from their respective teams: Peter Fehse (Seattle's only pick), Marcus Taylor (Minnesota's only pick) and Mladen Šekularac (Dallas' only pick).

== Draft selections ==
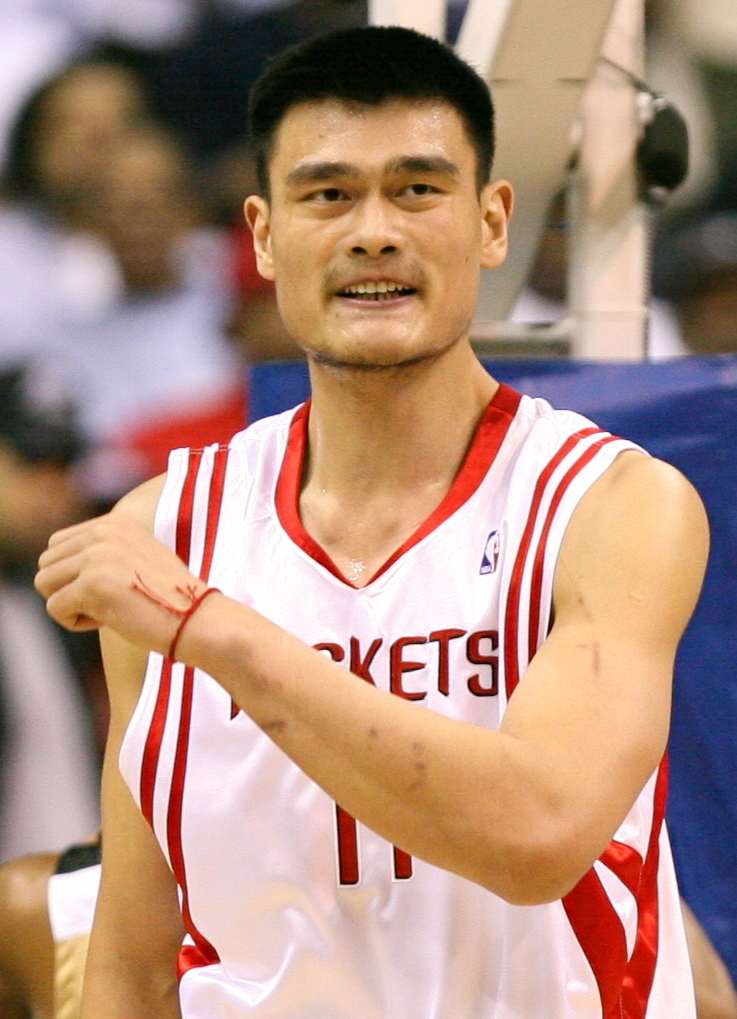
Yao Ming was selected 1st overall by the Houston Rockets.

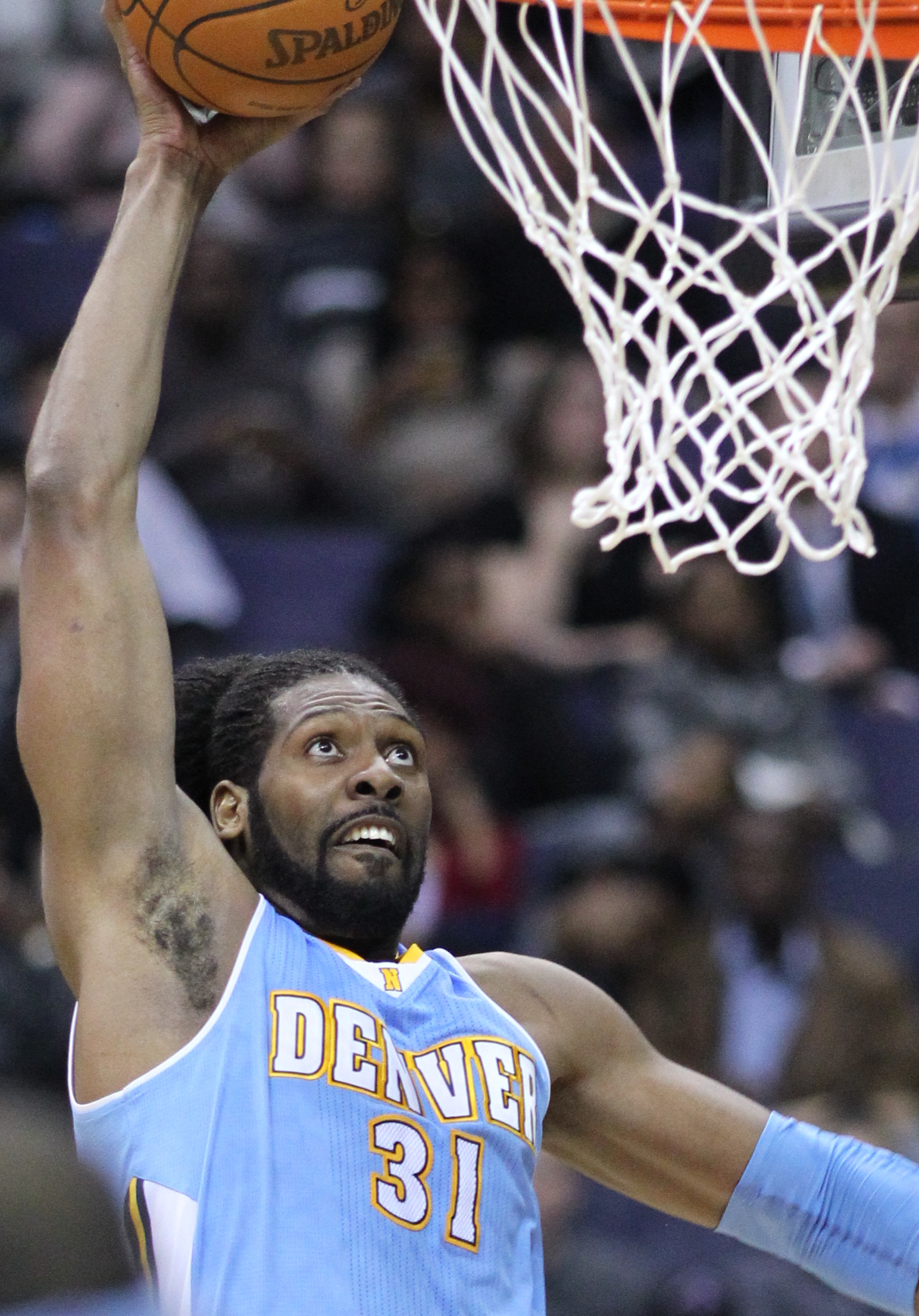
Nenê was selected 7th overall by the New York Knicks (traded to the Denver Nuggets.)

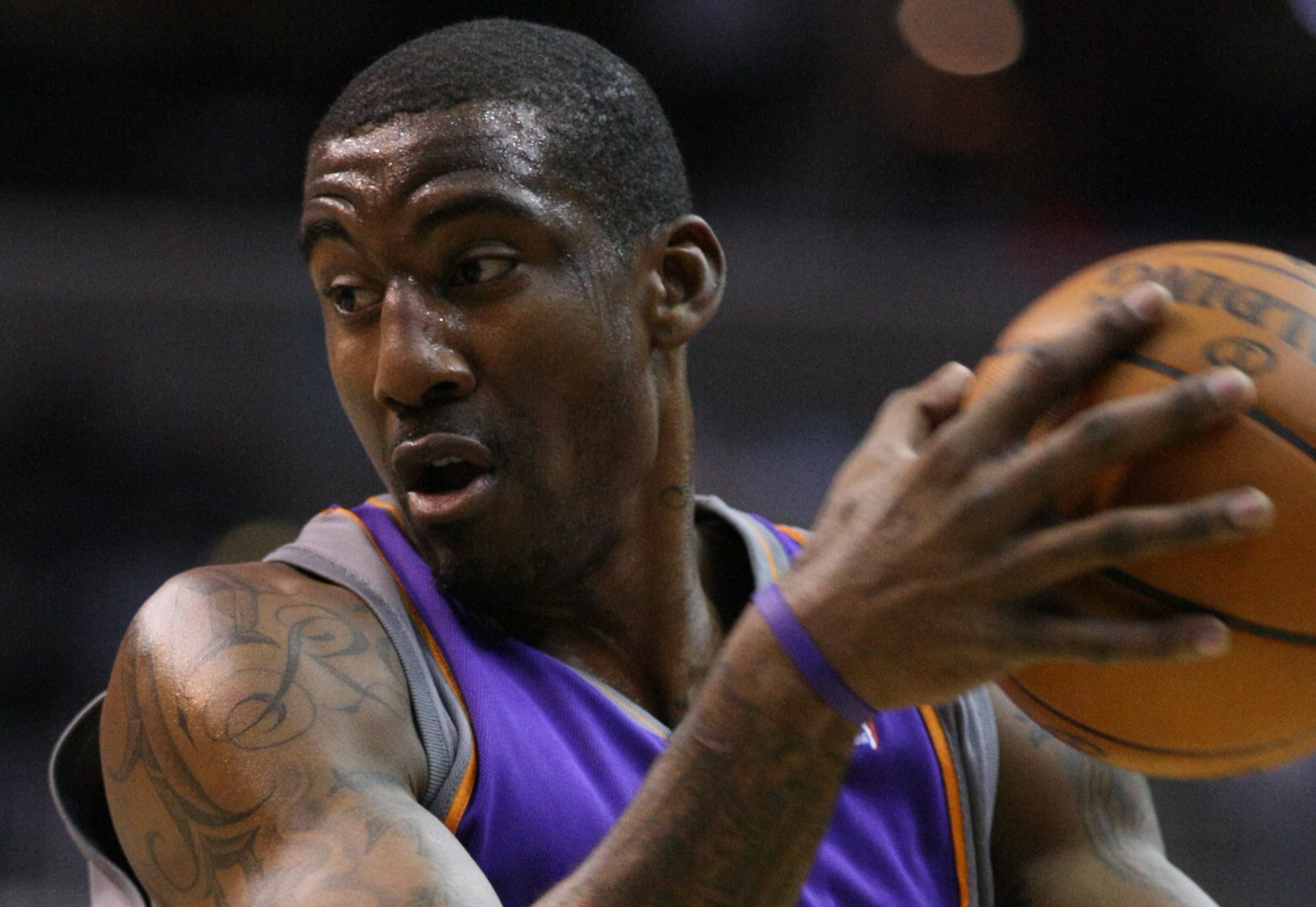
Amar'e Stoudemire was selected 9th overall by the Phoenix Suns.

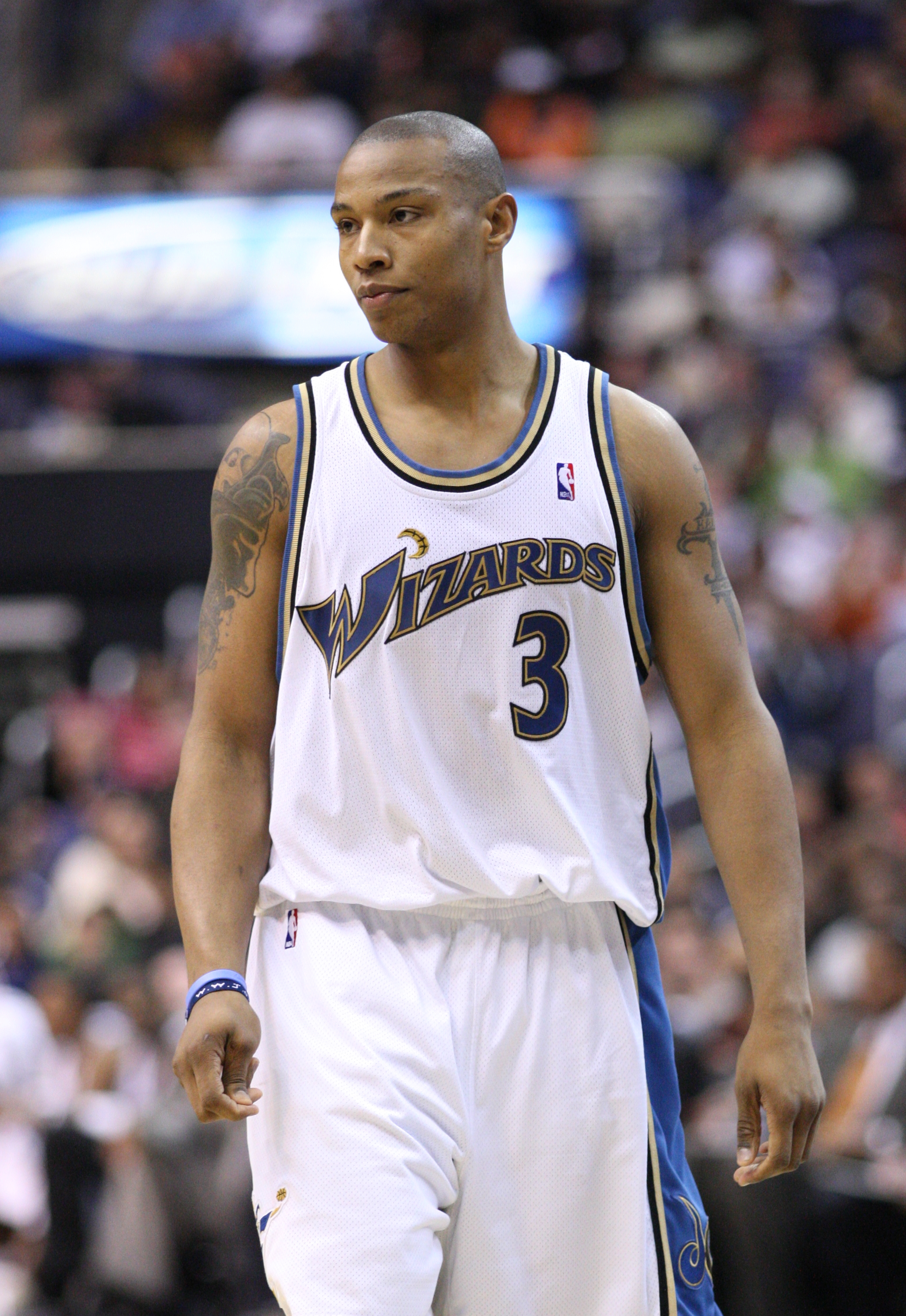
Caron Butler was selected 10th overall by the Miami Heat.

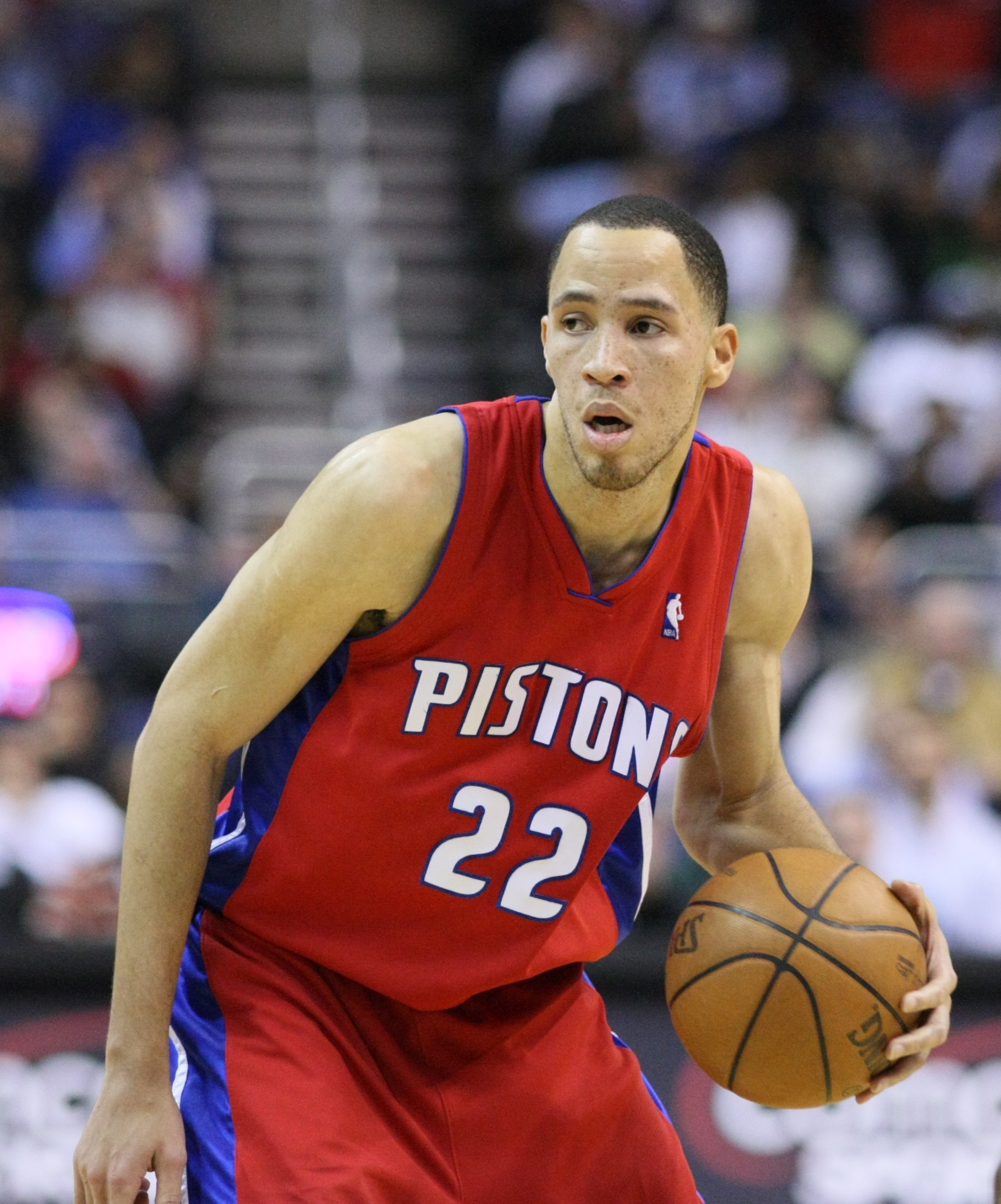
Tayshaun Prince was selected 23rd overall by the Detroit Pistons.

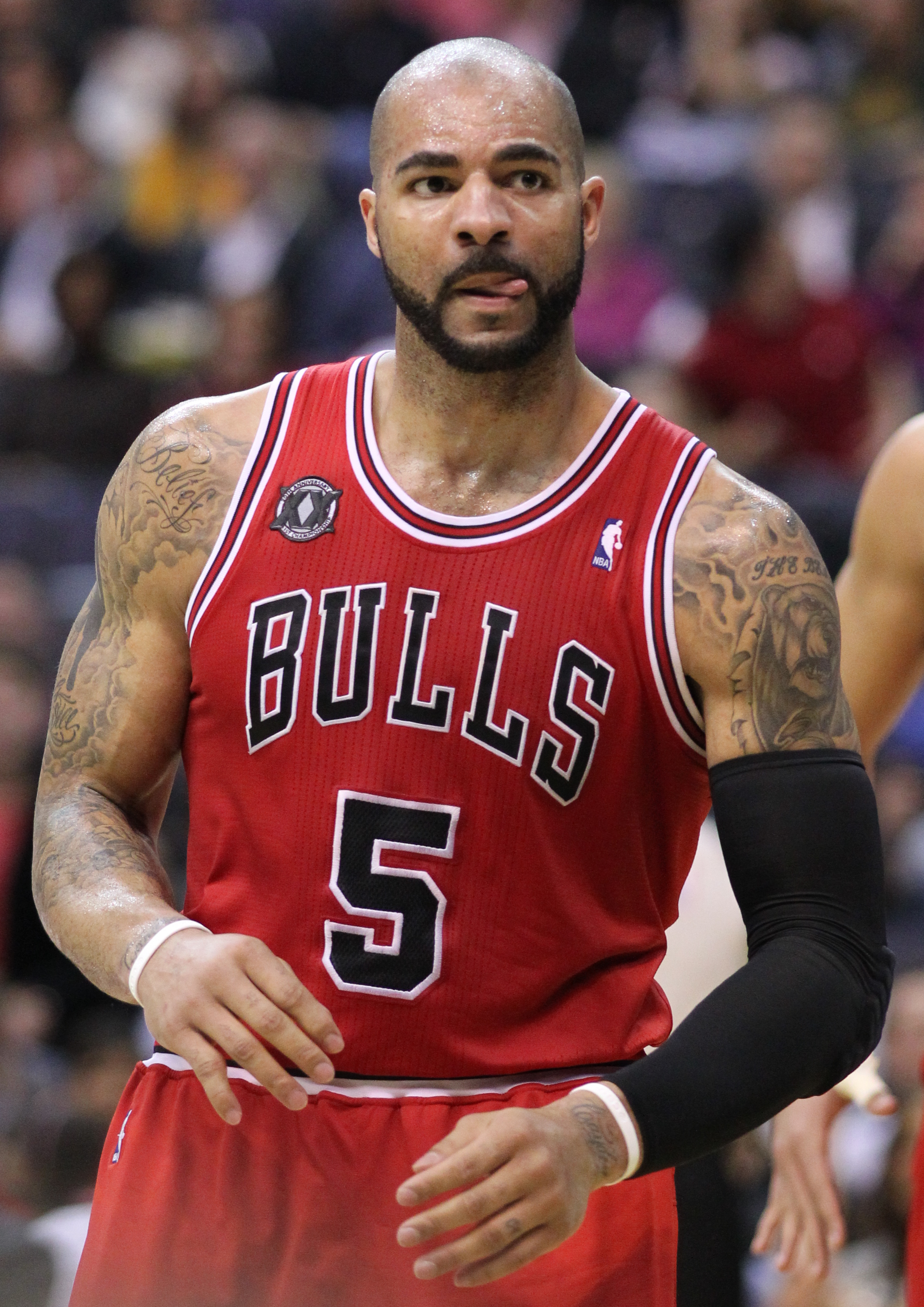
Carlos Boozer was selected 35th overall by the Cleveland Cavaliers.

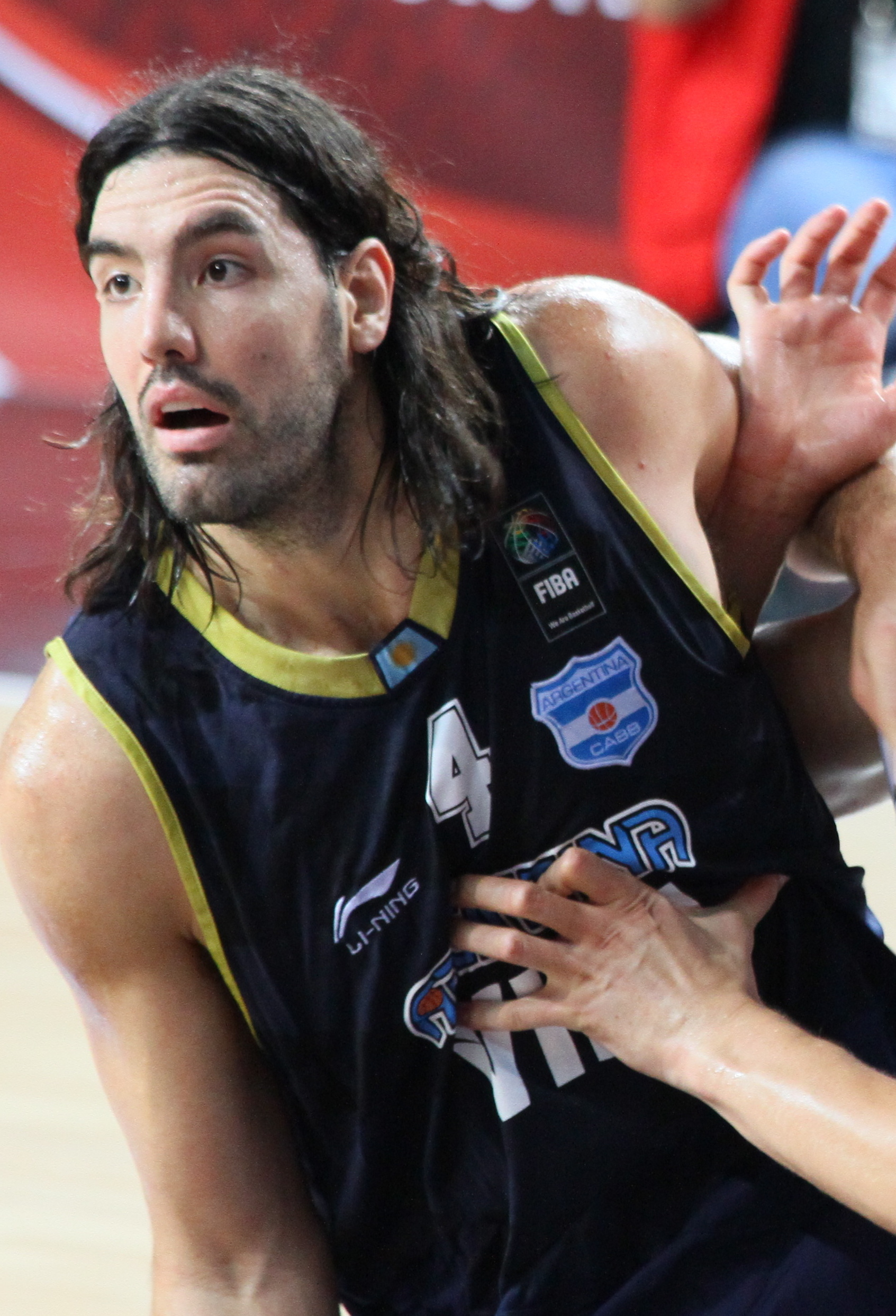
Luis Scola was selected 56th overall by the San Antonio Spurs (traded to the Houston Rockets.)

PG	Point guard	SG	Shooting guard	SF	Small forward	PF	Power forward	C	Center

^	Denotes player who has been inducted to the Naismith Memorial Basketball Hall of Fame
*	Denotes player who has been selected for at least one All-Star Game and All-NBA Team
^{+}	Denotes player who has been selected for at least one All-Star Game
^{#}	Denotes player who has never appeared in an NBA regular-season or playoff game
^{~}	Denotes player who has been selected as Rookie of the Year

Round	Pick	Player	Position	Nationality (Note: Nationality indicates the player's national team or representative nationality. If a player has not competed at the international level, then the nationality indicates the national team which the player is eligible to represent according to FIBA rules.)	Team	School or club team
1	1	Yao Ming^{^*}	C	China	Houston Rockets	Shanghai Sharks (China)
1	2	Jay Williams	PG	United States	Chicago Bulls	Duke (Jr.)
1	3	Mike Dunleavy Jr.	SF/SG	United States	Golden State Warriors	Duke (Jr.)
1	4	Drew Gooden	PF/C	United States	Memphis Grizzlies	Kansas (Jr.)
1	5	Nikoloz Tskitishvili	PF/C	Georgia	Denver Nuggets	Benetton Treviso (Italy)
1	6	Dajuan Wagner	PG	United States	Cleveland Cavaliers	Memphis (Fr.)
1	7	Nenê Hilario	C/PF	Brazil	New York Knicks (traded to Denver)	Vasco da Gama (Brazil)
1	8	Chris Wilcox	PF/C	United States	Los Angeles Clippers (from Atlanta)	Maryland (So.)
1	9	Amar'e Stoudemire^{^~}	PF/C	United States	Phoenix Suns	Cypress Creek HS (Orlando, Florida)
1	10	Caron Butler^{+}	SF	United States	Miami Heat	Connecticut (So.)
1	11	Jared Jeffries	PF/C	United States	Washington Wizards	Indiana (So.)
1	12	Melvin Ely	C/PF	United States	Los Angeles Clippers	Fresno State (Sr.)
1	13	Marcus Haislip	PF	United States	Milwaukee Bucks	Tennessee (Jr.)
1	14	Fred Jones	SG	United States	Indiana Pacers	Oregon (Sr.)
1	15	Boštjan Nachbar	SF/PF	Slovenia	Houston Rockets (from Toronto)	Benetton Treviso (Italy)
1	16	Jiří Welsch	SG/SF	Czech Republic	Philadelphia 76ers (traded to Golden State)	Union Olimpija (Slovenia and Adriatic League)
1	17	Juan Dixon	PG	United States	Washington Wizards (from New Orleans)	Maryland (Sr.)
1	18	Curtis Borchardt	C	United States	Orlando Magic (traded to Utah)	Stanford (Jr.)
1	19	Ryan Humphrey	PF	United States	Utah Jazz (traded to Orlando)	Notre Dame (Sr.)
1	20	Kareem Rush	SG	United States	Toronto Raptors (from Seattle via New York, traded to Los Angeles Lakers)	Missouri (Jr.)
1	21	Qyntel Woods	SF	United States	Portland Trail Blazers	Northeast Mississippi CC (So.)
1	22	Casey Jacobsen	SG	United States	Phoenix Suns (from Boston)	Stanford (Jr.)
1	23	Tayshaun Prince	SF	United States	Detroit Pistons	Kentucky (Sr.)
1	24	Nenad Krstić	C/PF	FR Yugoslavia	New Jersey Nets	Partizan Belgrade (Sinalco Superleague and Adriatic League)
1	25	Frank Williams	PG	United States	Denver Nuggets (from Dallas, traded to New York)	Illinois (Jr.)
1	26	John Salmons	SF/SG	United States	San Antonio Spurs (traded to Philadelphia)	Miami (Sr.)
1	27	Chris Jefferies	SF	United States	Los Angeles Lakers (traded to Toronto)	Fresno State (Jr.)
1	28	Dan Dickau	PG	United States	Sacramento Kings (traded to Atlanta)	Gonzaga (Sr.)
1	29	Forfeited pick			Minnesota Timberwolves (forfeited their first-round pick due to salary cap violations)	
2	30	Steve Logan^{#}	PG	United States	Golden State Warriors	Cincinnati (Sr.)
2	31	Roger Mason Jr.	SG	United States	Chicago Bulls	Virginia (Jr.)
2	32	Robert Archibald	PF	United Kingdom	Memphis Grizzlies	Illinois (Sr.)
2	33	Vincent Yarbrough	SF	United States	Denver Nuggets	Tennessee (Sr.)
2	34	Dan Gadzuric	C	Netherlands	Milwaukee Bucks (from Houston)	UCLA (Sr.)
2	35	Carlos Boozer^{*}	PF	United States	Cleveland Cavaliers	Duke (Jr.)
2	36	Miloš Vujanić^{#}	PG	(Federal Republic of Yugoslavia) FR Yugoslavia	New York Knicks	Partizan Belgrade (Sinalco Superleague and Adriatic League)
2	37	David Andersen	C	Australia	Atlanta Hawks	Virtus Bologna (Italy)
2	38	Tito Maddox	PG	United States	Houston Rockets (from Miami)	Fresno State (So.)
2	39	Rod Grizzard^{#}	SG	United States	Washington Wizards (from Phoenix via Denver)	Alabama (Jr.)
2	40	Juan Carlos Navarro	PG	Spain	Washington Wizards	FC Barcelona (Spain)
2	41	Mario Kasun	C	Croatia	Los Angeles Clippers	Opel Skyliners (Germany)
2	42	Ronald Murray	SG	United States	Milwaukee Bucks	Shaw (Sr.)
2	43	Jason Jennings^{#}	C	United States	Portland Trail Blazers (from Toronto via Chicago)	Arkansas State (Sr.)
2	44	Lonny Baxter	PF	United States	Chicago Bulls (from Indiana)	Maryland (Sr.)
2	45	Sam Clancy^{#}	PF	United States	Philadelphia 76ers	USC (Sr.)
2	46	Matt Barnes	SF	United States	Memphis Grizzlies (from Orlando)	UCLA (Sr.)
2	47	Jamal Sampson	C	United States	Utah Jazz (traded to Orlando)	California (Fr.)
2	48	Chris Owens	PF	United States	Milwaukee Bucks (from New Orleans, traded to Memphis)	Texas (Sr.)
2	49	Peter Fehse^{#}	PF	Germany	Seattle SuperSonics	Halle (Germany)
2	50	Darius Songaila	PF	Lithuania	Boston Celtics	Wake Forest (Sr.)
2	51	Federico Kammerichs^{#}	SF	Argentina	Portland Trail Blazers	Ourense (Spain)
2	52	Marcus Taylor^{#}	PG	United States	Minnesota Timberwolves	Michigan State (So.)
2	53	Rasual Butler	SF	United States	Miami Heat (from Detroit via Toronto and Houston)	La Salle (Sr.)
2	54	Tamar Slay	SG	United States	New Jersey Nets	Marshall (Sr.)
2	55	Mladen Šekularac^{#}	SG	(Federal Republic of Yugoslavia) FR Yugoslavia	Dallas Mavericks	FMP Železnik (Sinalco Superleague and Adriatic League)
2	56	Luis Scola	PF	Argentina	San Antonio Spurs (from L.A. Lakers)	TAU Cerámica (Spain)
2	57	Randy Holcomb	PF	United States; Libya	San Antonio Spurs (traded to Philadelphia)	San Diego State (Sr.)
2	58	Corsley Edwards	PF	United States	Sacramento Kings	Central Connecticut (Sr.)

== Notable undrafted players ==
These eligible players were not selected in this draft but played at least one game in the NBA.

Player	Position	Nationality	School or club team
Maurice Baker	PG	United States	Oklahoma State (Sr.)
J. R. Bremer	PG	United States	St. Bonaventure (Sr.)
Devin Brown	SG	United States	UTSA (Sr.)
Josh Davis	PF/SF	United States	Wyoming (Sr.)
Reggie Evans	PF	United States	Iowa (Sr.)
Alex Garcia	SG/SF	Brazil	COC Ribeirão Preto (Brazil)
Lynn Greer	PG/SG	United States	Temple (Sr.)
Anthony Grundy	PG/SG	United States	NC State (Sr.)
Adam Harrington	PG/SG	United States	Auburn (Sr.)
Lorinza Harrington	PG/SG	United States	Wingate (Sr.)
Udonis Haslem	PF	United States	Florida (Sr.)
Linton Johnson	SF	United States	Tulane (Sr.)
Arvydas Macijauskas	SG	Lithuania	Lietuvos Rytas (Lithuania)
D.J. Mbenga	C	DR Congo; Belgium	Leuven Bears (Belgium)
Keith McLeod	PG	United States	Bowling Green (Sr.)
Jannero Pargo	PG	United States	Arkansas (Sr.)
Smush Parker	PG/SG	United States	Fordham (So.)
Predrag Savović	SG	FR Yugoslavia	Hawaii (Sr.)
Awvee Storey	PF/SF	United States	Arizona State (Sr.)
Yuta Tabuse	PG	Japan	BYU–Hawaii (Fr.)

== Early entrants ==
=== College underclassmen ===
This year would mark a bit of a step down in terms of the number of underclassmen entering the NBA draft when compared to last year. While it would be the second time the number of underclassmen would exceed the number of draft picks available in the NBA, this year only saw a total of 72 underclassmen from college and overseas declare their initial entry into the NBA draft. However, it would exceed the amount of withdrawn players with 24 players doing exactly that, leaving a total of 48 eligible underclassmen available for the draft this year. The following college basketball players successfully applied for early draft entrance.

- (United States) Lee Benson – F, Brown Mackie (freshman)
- (United States) Rodney Bias – F, Alabama (sophomore)
- (United States) Cordell Billups – G, Pierce (Washington) (sophomore)
- (United States) Carlos Boozer – F, Duke (junior)
- (United States) Curtis Borchardt – C, Stanford (junior)
- (United States) Caron Butler – F, Connecticut (sophomore)
- (United States) Mike Dunleavy Jr. – F, Duke (junior)
- (United States) Drew Gooden – F, Kansas (junior)
- (United States) Rod Grizzard – G, Alabama (junior)
- (United States) Marcus Haislip – F, Tennessee (junior)
- (United States) Rashid Hardwick – C, Eastern Oklahoma State (freshman)
- (United States) Adam Harrington – G, Auburn (junior)
- (United States) Casey Jacobsen – G, Stanford (junior)
- (United States) Chris Jefferies – F, Fresno State (junior)
- (United States) Jared Jeffries – F, Indiana (sophomore)
- (Nigeria) Muhammed Lasege – C, Louisville (sophomore)
- (United States) Tito Maddox – G, Fresno State (sophomore)
- (United States) Kei Madison – F, Okaloosa-Walton (sophomore)
- (United States) Roger Mason Jr. – G, Virginia (junior)
- (United States) Smush Parker – G, Fordham (sophomore)
- (United States) Travis Robinson – F, Jacksonville (junior)
- (United States) Kareem Rush – G, Missouri (junior)
- (United States) Jamal Sampson – F/C, California (freshman)
- (United States) Jerry Sanders – F, Northern Illinois (sophomore)
- (United States) Eddie Shelby – G, Dixie State (sophomore)
- (United States) Bobby Smith – G, Robert Morris (junior)
- (United States) Melvin Steward – G, Eastern New Mexico (junior)
- (United States) Marcus Taylor – G, Michigan State (sophomore)
- (United States) Terrell Taylor – G, Creighton (junior)
- (United States) Dajuan Wagner – G, Memphis (freshman)
- (United States) Adrian Walton – G, Fordham (freshman)
- (United States) Joseph Ward – F, Fort Hays State (junior)
- (United States) Omar Weaver – F/G, Riverside CC (freshman)
- (United States) Chris Wilcox – F, Maryland (sophomore)
- (United States) Troy Wiley – F, Rhode Island (junior)
- (United States) Frank Williams – G, Illinois (junior)
- (United States) George Williams – F, Houston (junior)
- (United States) Jay Williams – G, Duke (junior)
- (United States) Qyntel Woods – G/F, Northeast Mississippi CC (sophomore)

=== High school players ===
This would be the eighth straight year in a row where at least one high school player would declare their entry into the NBA draft directly out of high school after previously only allowing it one time back in 1975. It would also mark the first time a player directly out of high school would win the NBA Rookie of the Year Award with Amar'e Stoudemire earning the honor one year before LeBron James would enter the NBA. The following high school players successfully applied for early draft entrance.

- (United States) DeAngelo Collins – F, Inglewood High School (Inglewood, California)
- (United States) Lenny Cooke – G, Mott Adult High School (Flint, Michigan)
- (Lithuania) Giedrius Rinkevicius – C, Bridgton Academy (Bridgton, Maine)
- (United States) Amar'e Stoudemire – F, Cypress Creek High School (Orlando, Florida)

=== International players ===
The following international players successfully applied for early draft entrance.

- Peter Fehse – F, Halle (Germany)
- Nenê Hilario – F, Vasco de Gama (Brazil)
- (Federal Republic of Yugoslavia) Nenad Krstic – Partizan (FR Yugoslavia)
- (Federal Republic of Yugoslavia) Mladen Šekularac – F, FMP (FR Yugoslavia)
- (Georgia (country)) Nikoloz Tskitishvili – F, Benetton Treviso (Italy)

== Invited attendees ==
The 2002 NBA draft is considered to be the 24th NBA draft to have utilized what is properly considered the "green room" experience for NBA prospects. The NBA's green room is a staging area where anticipated draftees often sit with their families and representatives, waiting for their names to be called on draft night. Often being positioned either in front of or to the side of the podium (in this case, being positioned somewhere within The Theater at Madison Square Garden), once a player heard his name, he would walk to the podium to shake hands and take promotional photos with the NBA commissioner. From there, the players often conducted interviews with various media outlets while backstage. From there, the players often conducted interviews with various media outlets while backstage. However, once the NBA draft started to air nationally on TV starting with the 1980 NBA draft, the green room evolved from players waiting to hear their name called and then shaking hands with these select players who were often called to the hotel to take promotional pictures with the NBA commissioner a day or two after the draft concluded to having players in real-time waiting to hear their names called up and then shaking hands with David Stern, the NBA's commissioner at the time.

The NBA compiled its list of green room invites through collective voting by the NBA's team presidents and general managers alike, which in this year's case belonged to only what they believed were the top 16 prospects at the time. Despite the higher amount of invites for this year's draft when compared to the previous two drafts, there would still be a couple of discrepancies involved with the invitations at hand, such as a missing invitation to Chinese Hall of Fame center Yao Ming from the Chinese Basketball Association's Shanghai Sharks (which would make him the first #1 pick to not be invited to the "green room" properly since David Robinson from the U.S. Navy back in 1987) and arguably a missing invitation for future NBA All-Star Carlos Boozer, who was taken in the second round of this year's draft. With that in mind, the following players were invited to attend this year's draft festivities live and in person.

- (United States) Curtis Borchardt – C, Stanford
- (United States) Caron Butler – SF, Connecticut
- (United States) Mike Dunleavy Jr. – SG/SF, Duke
- (United States) Melvin Ely – PF/C, Fresno State
- (United States) Drew Gooden – PF/C, Kansas
- (United States) Marcus Haislip – PF, Tennessee
- Maybyner "Nenê" Hilario – PF/C, Vasco de Gama (Brazil)
- (United States) Casey Jacobsen – SG/SF, Stanford
- (United States) Jared Jeffries – PF/C, Indiana
- (United States) Kareem Rush – SG, Missouri
- (United States) Amar'e Stoudemire – PF/C, Cypress Creek High School (Orlando, Florida)
- (Georgia (country)) Nikoloz Tskitishvili – PF/C, Benetton Treviso (Italy)
- (United States) Dajuan Wagner – PG/SG, Memphis
- (United States) Chris Wilcox – PF/C, Maryland
- (United States) Jay Williams – PG, Duke
- (United States) Qyntel Woods – SF, Northeast Mississippi Community College

== See also ==
- List of first overall NBA draft picks
