= Willie White (basketball) =

American basketball player

Personal information
- Born: August 20, 1962 (age 64) Memphis, Tennessee, U.S.
- Listed height: 6 ft 3 in (1.91 m)
- Listed weight: 195 lb (88 kg)

Career information
- High school: Carver (Memphis, Tennessee)
- College: Chattanooga (1980–1984)
- NBA draft: 1984: 2nd round, 42nd overall pick
- Drafted by: Denver Nuggets
- Position: Shooting guard
- Number: 10

Career history
- 1984–1986: Denver Nuggets

Career highlights
- SoCon Player of the Year (1982); 3× First-team All-SoCon (1982–1984)
- Stats at NBA.com
- Stats at Basketball Reference

Willie White (born August 20, 1962) is an American former National Basketball Association (NBA) player. After graduating from Carver High in Memphis, White attended the University of Tennessee at Chattanooga (UTC). In his freshman season, he averaged 11.8 points per game. UTC also won the Southern Conference championship and made their first NCAA Division I men's basketball tournament appearance. In Willie's sophomore season at UTC, he averaged 15.8 points per game, leading UTC to a second consecutive Southern Conference championship. Willie averaged 18.4 points per game his junior season, also leading UTC to a third straight Southern Conference championship. This was good enough for Willie to be named the Southern Conference Men's Basketball Player of the Year. He averaged 18 points a game his senior season, but lost in the Southern Conference Championship game in double overtime to Marshall. White was invited to the U.S. Olympic team trials in Bloomington, Indiana in 1984. Willie was drafted with eighteenth pick in the second round of the 1984 NBA draft by the Denver Nuggets. In Willie's two seasons with the Nuggets, he averaged 3.7 points, 1 rebound and 1 assist per game.

== Career statistics ==
Legend
GP	Games played	GS	Games started	MPG	Minutes per game
FG%	Field goal percentage	3P%	3-point field goal percentage	FT%	Free throw percentage
RPG	Rebounds per game	APG	Assists per game	SPG	Steals per game
BPG	Blocks per game	PPG	Points per game	**Bold**	Career high

=== NBA ===
==== Regular season ====
Year	Team	GP	GS	MPG	FG%	3P%	FT%	RPG	APG	SPG	BPG	PPG
1984–85	Denver	39	0	6.0	.419	**.364**	.677	.9	.7	.1	**.1**	3.3
1985–86	Denver	**43**	**4**	**8.0**	**.440**	.286	**.826**	**1.0**	**1.2**	**.4**	.0	**4.0**
Career		82	4	7.0	.432	.313	.741	1.0	1.0	.3	.0	3.7
