= Bob Hill =

American basketball coach (born 1948)

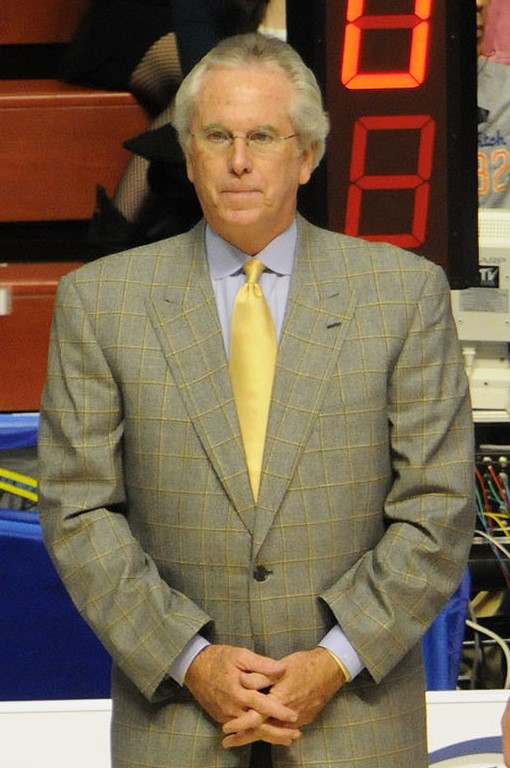
- Hill during his tenure with the Tokyo Apache

Personal information
- Born: November 24, 1948 (age 77) Columbus, Ohio, U.S.
- Listed height: 6 ft 5 in (1.96 m)
- Listed weight: 200 lb (91 kg)

Career information
- High school: Worthington (Worthington, Ohio)
- College: Bowling Green (1968–1971)
- Coaching career: 1975–2016

Career history

Coaching
- 1975–1978: Pittsburgh (assistant)
- 1979–1985: Kansas (assistant)
- 1985–1987: New York Knicks (assistant)
- 1986–1987: New York Knicks
- 1988–1989: Virtus Bologna
- 1989–1990: Indiana Pacers (assistant)
- 1990–1993: Indiana Pacers
- 1993–1994: Orlando Magic (assistant)
- 1994–1996: San Antonio Spurs
- 1999–2003: Fordham
- 2005–2007: Seattle SuperSonics
- 2011: Tokyo Apache
- 2016: Phoenix Suns (assistant)

Career highlights
- As head coach: Italian Cup champion (1989); As assistant coach: 2× Big 12 Conference Tournament champion (1981, 1984)

Robert W. Hill (born November 24, 1948) is an American basketball coach. Hill grew up in Mount Sterling, Ohio, moving to Worthington, Ohio, for high school. Hill attended Bowling Green State University.

== Career ==
=== College ===
Hill played basketball and baseball collegiately at Bowling Green State University and was also a member of the Sigma Chi Fraternity. He attended the school during a time when college players were not eligible to join the varsity squad until their sophomore seasons; although statistics indicated he showed tremendous promise as a member of the freshman team, his success never really translated over to his tenure as a member of the varsity team. He then became interested in coaching.

=== Early coaching career ===
Hill was an assistant on Tim Grgurich's coaching staff at the University of Pittsburgh for three seasons from 1975 to 1978. He was appointed to a similar capacity at the University of Kansas by Ted Owens in 1979 and stayed for six years until 1985, the last two with Larry Brown.

=== As NBA coach ===
==== As an assistant ====
Hill was an assistant with Hubie Brown and the New York Knicks for the 1985–86 season. The following season, Brown was fired after a 4–12 start and Hill became Head Coach on December 1, 1986. He would finish out that season with the Knicks and then became an assistant for the Pacers under Dick Versace in 1989.

==== Indiana Pacers ====
On December 20, 1990, Hill was promoted to head coach of the Pacers after Versace's firing. He spent three seasons as the Indiana Pacers' head coach (1990–93), leading the Pacers to the NBA playoffs all three years.

==== San Antonio Spurs ====
After being fired by the Pacers and being an assistant coach for the Orlando Magic for a season, Hill piloted the San Antonio Spurs to an NBA-best 62 wins in 1994–95 before losing to the Houston Rockets in the Western Conference finals. After a 3–15 start to the 1996–97 season, Hill was fired by one of his bosses, Gregg Popovich, who thereafter replaced Hill as the Spurs coach. Hill's firing at the time was puzzling to some and deeply angered Hill, considering his previous success and the fact that the poor start to the season was due in large part to injuries to David Robinson and Sean Elliott, the team's two best players. Under Popovich, the Spurs proceeded to win five NBA titles in the next two decades.

=== At Fordham University ===
Between 1999 and 2003, Hill was head coach at Fordham University where he compiled a 36–78 record (31.6% winning %). He was let go by the Rams following the 2002–03 season after only 1 win in the Atlantic 10. The Rams finished 2–26 in 2003, the worst record in school history. Fordham paid Hill $650,000 to leave the university in a buyout agreement four years into his 10-year deal.

Hill took responsibility for his rocky four-year tenure at Fordham. "Fordham was my fault; I just shouldn't have done it," Hill told the New York Daily News. "I don't want to get into why," he added, "just blame it on me." "I guess the best way to put it (is), I've had a really privileged career," Hill said, "I've been around a lot of great organizations; I've had a lot of great players. I've always had success to some degree, so I feel like I understand what it takes to do that and it just didn't work." Asked to recount some of the missteps he made during his tenure at Fordham, Hill said that he made a mistake before the 2002–03 season in trying to bring in playground players such as Adrian Walton and Smush Parker. "We tried to bring the Rucker League to Fordham and it didn't work out," Hill said. Hill added he didn't have any regrets about his time in the Bronx. "It's a good school, good people, the whole thing, but I made a mistake," Hill said. "I don't really regret it," he added. "I've learned so much about what those young guys go through to try to be successful. It's hard for them."

=== Return to NBA ===
==== Seattle SuperSonics ====
On January 3, 2006, Hill replaced Bob Weiss as head coach of the Seattle SuperSonics, after a lackluster 13–17 start to the 2005–06 season; he had most recently served as assistant coach for the team. He was fired over the phone as Sonics head coach on April 24, 2007, after their penultimate season in Seattle, after which they became the Oklahoma City Thunder.

He holds a career win–loss NBA coaching record of 310–293.

==== Phoenix Suns ====
On February 1, 2016, it was announced that Hill would be the Phoenix Suns' newest assistant head coach for the rest of the 2015–16 season after it was announced that the Suns would fire Jeff Hornacek as their head coach and replace him for the season with his former player under the Seattle SuperSonics, Earl Watson. After his contract for 2016 expired, it was announced that the contracts for both Hill and Corey Gaines would not be renewed with the team.

== International experience ==
During the summer of 2011, Hill was invited by Nike to help the Taiwan men's basketball team as a consultant. He also has coached the Tokyo Apache of the Japanese bj league. Most recently, Hill was the assistant coach of the Ukrainian national team at the 2014 FIBA World Cup and the 2015 Euroleague.

== Personal life ==
Hill has three sons with his wife Pam. The oldest, Cameron, is currently the head women's basketball coach at Trinity University in San Antonio and is the owner of CHB, specializing in player development and team training. His second son, Chris, is the head basketball coach at Jesuit College Preparatory School of Dallas, and his youngest, Casey, is an assistant for the NBA's New Orleans Pelicans.

== Head coaching record ==
Legend
Regular season	G	Games coached	W	Games won	L	Games lost	W–L %	Win–loss %
Playoffs	PG	Playoff games	PW	Playoff wins	PL	Playoff losses	PW–L %	Playoff win–loss %

Team	Year	G	W	L	W–L%	Finish	PG	PW	PL	PW–L%	Result
New York	1986–87	66	20	46	.303	4th in Atlantic	—	—	—	—	Missed Playoffs
Indiana	1990–91	57	32	25	.561	5th in Central	5	2	3	.400	Lost in First Round
Indiana	1991–92	82	40	42	.488	4th in Central	3	0	3	.000	Lost in First Round
Indiana	1992–93	82	41	41	.500	5th in Central	4	1	3	.250	Lost in First Round
San Antonio	1994–95	82	62	20	.756	1st in Midwest	15	9	6	.600	Lost in Conf. Finals
San Antonio	1995–96	82	59	23	.720	1st in Midwest	10	5	5	.500	Lost in Conf. Semifinals
San Antonio	1996–97	18	3	15	.167	(fired)	—	—	—	—	—
Seattle	2005–06	52	22	30	.423	3rd in Northwest	—	—	—	—	Missed Playoffs
Seattle	2006–07	82	31	51	.378	5th in Northwest	—	—	—	—	Missed Playoffs
Career		603	310	293	.514		37	17	20	.459	

== Books ==
- Basketball: Coaching for Success (2000) ISBN 1-58518-249-4
