= Chris Jefferies =

American former professional basketball player

Personal information
- Born: February 13, 1980 (age 46) Fresno, California, U.S.
- Listed height: 6 ft 8 in (2.03 m)
- Listed weight: 230 lb (104 kg)

Career information
- High school: Washington Union (Easton, California)
- College: Arkansas (1998–1999); Fresno State (2000–2002)
- NBA draft: 2002: 1st round, 27th overall pick
- Drafted by: Los Angeles Lakers
- Playing career: 2002–2004
- Position: Small forward / shooting guard
- Number: 1, 32, 6

Career history
- 2002–2003: Toronto Raptors
- 2003–2004: Chicago Bulls

Career highlights
- First-team All-WAC (2001)
- Stats at NBA.com
- Stats at Basketball Reference

Christopher Allen Jefferies (born February 13, 1980) is an American former professional basketball player. He played for the Toronto Raptors and the Chicago Bulls in the National Basketball Association (NBA). He played college basketball for the Arkansas Razorbacks and Fresno State Bulldogs.

== College career ==
Jefferies was named First Team All-Western Athletic Conference, All-Defensive Team and All-Newcomer Team as a sophomore at Fresno State University. Also named WAC Newcomer of the Year by the conference media. Jefferies had transferred from the Arkansas following his freshman year.

== Professional career ==
Selected in the first round (27th overall pick) of the 2002 NBA draft out of Fresno State by the Los Angeles Lakers, his draft rights were traded along with Lindsey Hunter to the Toronto Raptors for Tracy Murray and the draft rights to Kareem Rush. He was later traded to the Chicago Bulls during the 2003–04 season.

Jefferies' final NBA game was played on April 14, 2004, in a 96–101 loss to the Indiana Pacers where he recorded 2 points and 5 fouls as the Bulls' starting Small Forward. In his short NBA career, Jefferies registered 72 games played, 12 game starts, and averaged 3.9 points and 1.2 rebounds per game. He is also the half-brother to Nate Jefferies, Immanuel High School basketball star.
