= George Washington Carver High School (Memphis, Tennessee) =

Former segregated public school in Memphis

Carver High School

Location
- Memphis, Tennessee; U.S.
- Coordinates: 35.1045°N 90.0680°W

Information
- Type: Public
- Website: web.archive.org/*/http://www.scsk12.org/schools/carver.hs/site/index.shtml

George Washington Carver High School was a public high school in Memphis, Tennessee from the late 1950s until 2016. Prior to integration, it was a school for black students. It was at times a part of Memphis City Schools, and at the end it was a part of Shelby County Schools (SCS), as that district took over the former Memphis school campuses in 2013.

It was also known as Carver Middle/High School.

== History ==
Carver was opened in 1957 as a school for the black students in the Riverside neighborhood of South Memphis. Like many black schools of the time, it received far less funding than the white schools. As such, it was operated without a cafeteria. The school's first guidance counselor was Frances Hooks, the wife of activist Benjamin Hooks. The first principal was Richard B. Thompson. For 59 years, Carver educated students in the South Memphis Area.

The students moved from the original building, A, to the later one, B, in 1997 as part of a $10,500,000 renovation. Building A was razed in May of that year.

In 2016, the Shelby County School Board voted to close the school. At the time of its closure, it was the most segregated school in Memphis.

== Notable people ==
- Jim Thaxton, NFL football player
- Willie White, NBA basketball player
- Qyntel Woods, NBA basketball player
