= Peter Fehse =

German basketball player (born 1983)

Personal information
- Born: 18 May 1983 (age 43) Halle, East Germany
- Listed height: 6 ft 11 in (2.11 m)

Career information
- NBA draft: 2002: 2nd round, 49th overall pick
- Drafted by: Seattle SuperSonics
- Playing career: 2000–2011
- Position: Power forward / center
- Number: 7

Career history
- 2000–2002: SV Halle
- 2002–2003: Skyliners Frankfurt
- 2003–2004: Mitteldeutscher
- 2004–2008: New Yorker Phantoms
- 2008–2009: SG Braunschweig
- 2009–2011: Mitteldeutscher

Career highlights
- FIBA EuroCup Challenge champion (2004)
- Stats at Basketball Reference

Peter Fehse (born 18 May 1983) is a German professional basketball player who is currently coaching for BG Bitterfeld-Sandersdorf-Wolfen in the German third league assisting former German national player Stephen Arigbabu. He was drafted by the NBA's Seattle SuperSonics with the 49th overall pick in the second round of the 2002 NBA draft, but ended up never playing in an NBA game (making him 1 of 9 players from the 2002 NBA Draft to never play in the league).

Fehse, a 6 ft 11 in power forward, began playing professionally for SV Halle in 2000. He played two seasons for the team before being drafted by the SuperSonics. He opted to remain in Europe, however, and went on to play for the Deutsche Bank Skyliners in the 2002–03 and Mitteldeutscher BC for the 2003–04 season, where he won the FIBA Europe Cup. In 2004, he joined the New Yorker Phantoms Braunschweig for three seasons, but was unable to provide any impact due to injuries. In 2008, he joined the team of SG Braunschweig in the German second league to gain some playing experience. In summer 2009 he went back to Mitteldeutscher BC, but has not played in a game yet. Instead he is working as an assistant coach with the Under-19 team of Mitteldeutscher BC.

Fehse also has made appearances for the German national youth team in the 2000 qualifying tournament for the FIBA World Championship.

On 22 December 2009 Fehse's rights were traded by the Oklahoma City Thunder (formerly the Seattle SuperSonics) to the Utah Jazz for Eric Maynor and the contract of injured forward Matt Harpring. The trade was primarily a salary dump for the Jazz to decrease their luxury tax assessment.
