= Qyntel Woods =

American basketball player (born 1981)

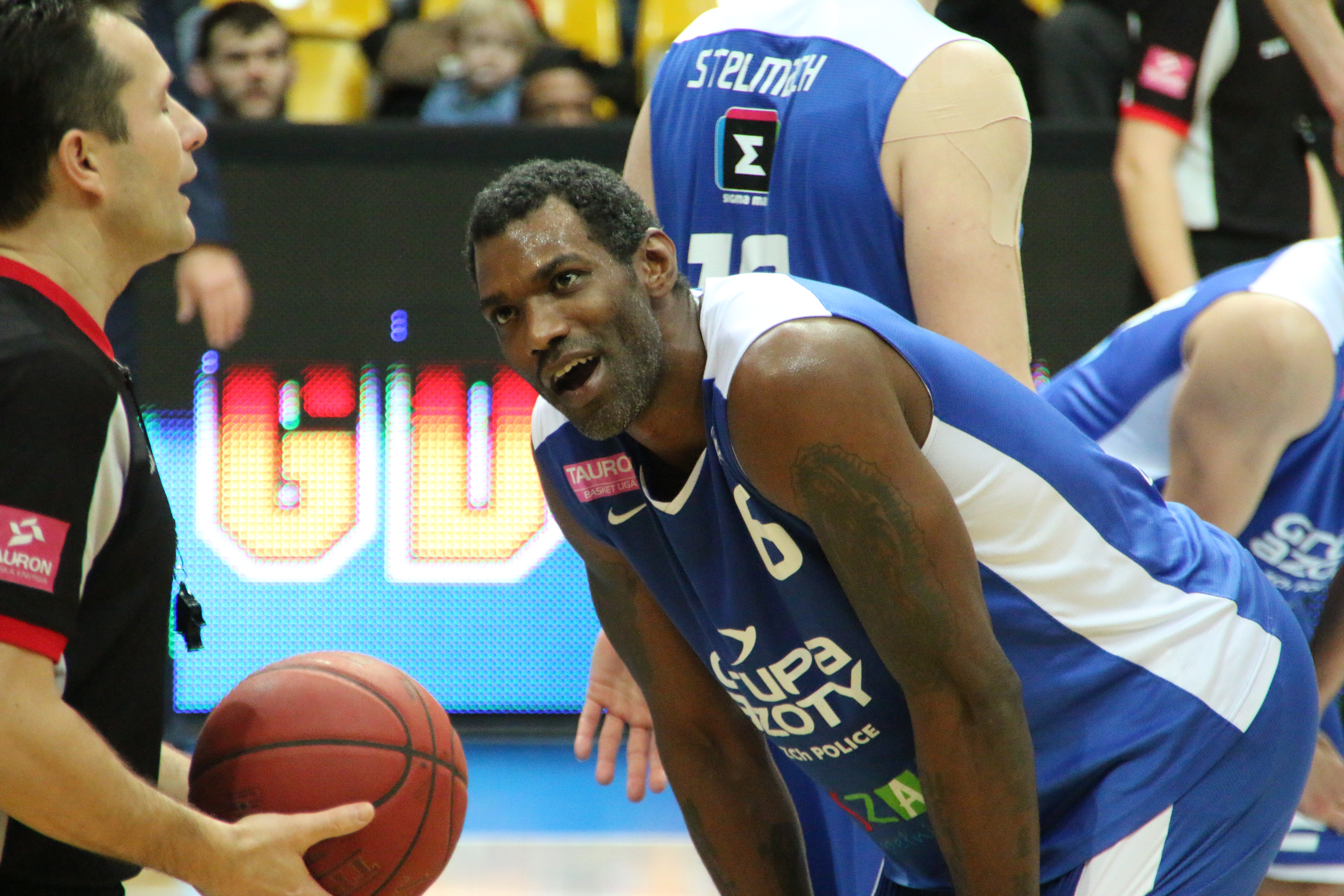
- Woods with AZS Koszalin in 2015

Personal information
- Born: February 16, 1981 (age 45) Memphis, Tennessee, U.S.
- Listed height: 6 ft 8 in (2.03 m)
- Listed weight: 220 lb (100 kg)

Career information
- High school: Carver (Memphis, Tennessee)
- College: Moberly Area CC (2000–2001); Northeast Mississippi CC (2001–2002)
- NBA draft: 2002: 1st round, 21st overall pick
- Drafted by: Portland Trail Blazers
- Playing career: 2002–2019
- Position: Small forward / shooting guard
- Number: 24, 6

Career history
- 2002–2004: Portland Trail Blazers
- 2005: Miami Heat
- 2005–2006: New York Knicks
- 2007: Bakersfield Jam
- 2007–2008: Olympiacos
- 2008–2009: Fortitudo Bologna
- 2009–2010: Asseco Prokom Gdynia
- 2010: Krasnye Krylya
- 2011: Asseco Prokom Gdynia
- 2011: Maccabi Haifa
- 2012: Dnipro
- 2012–2013: Lagun Aro GBC
- 2014–2015: AZS Koszalin
- 2015–2010: Cholet Basket
- 2017–2019: AZS Koszalin

Career highlights
- 3× Polish League champion (2009–2011); Polish League MVP (2010); Polish League Finals MVP (2009); Polish League Top Scorer (2009); Polish League All–Star Game (2010); All-Greek League Second Team (2008); Greek All–Star Game (2008); Greek All-Star Game Slam Dunk Champion (2008)
- Stats at NBA.com
- Stats at Basketball Reference

Qyntel Deon Woods (born February 16, 1981) is an American former professional basketball player. He played mainly at the small forward position, but he also played at the shooting guard position, on occasion.

== Early life and college career ==
Woods was born in Memphis, and grew up in the Mallory Heights neighborhood. After attending Carver High School, he spent one season of college basketball each at Moberly Area Community College and Northeast Mississippi Community College. Coming out of college, Woods was known to pro scouts as a player with exceptional potential (and was sometimes compared to Tracy McGrady), but with a history of off-court problems. He was an early entry candidate in the 2002 NBA draft, and he had committed to play at the University of Memphis, before making himself available for draft selection.

== Professional career ==
=== NBA ===
Woods was selected by the NBA's Portland Trail Blazers, with the 21st pick of the 2002 NBA draft. In his first two seasons with the Trail Blazers, Woods played in 115 games (53 and 62 respectively), averaging 2.4 and 3.6 points per game, and appearing sparingly in the 2003 postseason. The 2004–05 season was packed with off-court trouble for Woods, as he was charged with animal cruelty, following an investigation. He pleaded guilty to first-degree animal abuse, for staging dog fights in his house, some involving his pit bull named Hollywood. Both Hollywood and Woods' other pit bull, Sugar, were confiscated, and Woods was given 80 hours of community service, and he also agreed to donate $10,000 to the Oregon Humane Society.

In response to these events, the Trail Blazers suspended and eventually released Woods, in a settlement that involved pay withheld from Woods in 2004–05, when he was supposed to be paid $1.1 million for the third year of a three-year contract. The Trail Blazers kept about $500,000, said spokesman Art Sasse. Upon finally leaving Portland in January 2005, Woods subsequently joined the Miami Heat. He played with them in three regular season games (with averages of 3.3 points and 2 rebounds per game), but he was not used in the playoffs. He was part of a 13-player mega deal that sent him to the Boston Celtics, on August 2, 2005. He ended up being waived by the Celtics, after having played in only three exhibition games with the team, and he was subsequently signed by the New York Knicks, on December 6, 2005.

Woods' final NBA game was on April 19, 2006, in a 90–83 win over the New Jersey Nets where he recorded 2 points, 6 rebounds, 1 assist and 1 steal.

He played more under then Knicks head coach Larry Brown, starting sixteen games and averaging career highs in minutes per game, field goal percentage, points per game, rebounds, and assists. However, he was not kept for the following season, and he would end up playing a month (from February to March) in the NBA Development League, with the Bakersfield Jam.

=== Europe ===
Woods signed a two-year contract with Greek Basket League team Olympiacos on July 16, 2007. In 10 appearances in the Greek League regular season, he averaged 12.5 points per game in 26.3 minutes per game. In the Greek League's 2007–08 playoffs, his numbers went down (8.1 points, 2.1 rebounds, in 20.7 minutes per game).

Woods was caught using marijuana during the Greek League finals, and thus committed a breach of his contract, which led to Olympiacos terminating the final year of his deal. Subsequently, he signed with the Italian league's Fortitudo Pallacanestro Bologna, after being released by Olympiacos.

Woods played with Asseco Prokom Gdynia in Poland, where he contributed to their seventh straight Polish national league championship. Wood played a leading role in Asseco's run to the EuroLeague's Top 8 in the 2009–10 season. In the same season, he was awarded the Polish League MVP award.

In November 2010, Woods signed a one-year contract with the Russian club Krasnye Krylya Samara, but he was waived in December. because of an unsatisfactory performance. On January 30, 2011, he returned to play with Asseco Prokom Gdynia, with whom he had the best years of his career in Europe. In the summer of 2011, he signed with the Israeli squad Maccabi Haifa. One year later, he signed with Lagun Aro GBC of Spain.

On July 8, 2013, Woods signed with the French club Le Mans Sarthe Basket. On September 5, 2013, he left Le Mans, after he failed to pass the team's physical, due to a knee injury. In August, 2014 Woods signed with AZS Koszalin, of the Polish Basketball League. On July 16, 2015, Woods signed with the French club Cholet Basket. On October 15, 2017, Woods signed with AZS Koszalin, returning to the club for a second stint.

== Career statistics ==
=== Domestic leagues ===
Season	Team	League	GP	MPG	FG%	3P%	FT%	RPG	APG	SPG	BPG	PPG
2006–07	Bakersfield Jam	D-League	7	15.3	.511	.286	.750	2.1	.6	.1	.3	8.7
2007–08	Olympiacos	GBL	22	21.6	.634	.366	.703	2.4	.9	.4	.3	10.1
2008–09	GMAC Bologna	LBA	10	25.0	.493	.229	.912	3.9	.9	1.8	.4	12.9
2008–09	Asseco Prokom	Polish PLK	23	27.6	.624	.416	.750	6.3	1.6	1.7	.5	19.2
2009–10	Asseco Prokom	Polish PLK	32	25.1	.502	.347	.755	6.6	2.5	1.1	.5	14.5
2010–11	Krasnye Krylia	Russian PBL	1	2.0	–	–	–	.0	.0	.0	.0	.0
2010–11	Asseco Prokom	Polish PLK	13	11.7	.512	.292	.500	2.1	.9	1.0	.3	5.8
2011–12	Maccabi Haifa	ISBL	4	22.8	.350	.313	.000	4.0	2.5	.8	.5	7.3
2011–12	Dnipro	Ukrainian SuperLeague	22	28.6	.478	.274	.677	5.8	2.6	1.0	.8	13.0
2012–13	Lagun Aro GBC	ACB	29	22.9	.413	.364	.754	4.0	1.0	1.0	.4	11.9
2014–15	AZS Koszalin	Polish PLK	30	28.7	.564	.339	.742	7.2	2.8	1.1	.4	19.3
