= Jim Thaxton =

American football player (born 1949)

No. 86, 84, 87
- Position: Tight end / Wide receiver

Personal information
- Born: January 11, 1949 (age 77); Brownsville, Tennessee, U.S.
- Listed height: 6 ft 2 in (1.88 m)
- Listed weight: 240 lb (109 kg)

Career information
- High school: George Washington Carver (Memphis, Tennessee)
- College: Tennessee State (1969–1972)
- NFL draft: 1973: 4th round, 84th overall pick

Career history
- San Diego Chargers (1973–1974); Cleveland Browns (1974); Oakland Raiders (1975)*; New Orleans Saints (1976–1977); St. Louis Cardinals (1978)
- * Offseason or practice squad member only

Career NFL statistics
- Receptions: 35
- Receiving yards: 544
- Receiving TDs: 5
- Stats at Pro Football Reference

James Ivory Thaxton (born January 11, 1949) is an American former professional football player who was a tight end for five seasons in the National Football League (NFL) with the San Diego Chargers, Cleveland Browns, New Orleans Saints and St. Louis Cardinals. He was selected by the Chargers in the fourth round of the 1973 NFL draft. He played college football for the Tennessee State Tigers.

== Early life and college ==
James Ivory Thaxton was born on January 11, 1949, in Brownsville, Tennessee. He attended George Washington Carver High School in Memphis, Tennessee.

Thaxton was a member of the Tennessee State Tigers football team from 1969 to 1972 and a three-year letterman from 1970 to 1972. He was named an All-American by the Pittsburgh Courier in both 1971 and 1972. He was also named an All-American by Black Mutual in 1972.

== Professional career ==
Thaxton was selected by the San Diego Chargers in the fourth round, with the 84th overall pick, of the 1973 NFL draft. He played in ten games, starting three, for the Chargers during his rookie year in 1973, catching seven passes for 119 yards and two touchdowns. He appeared in two games for the Chargers in 1974 but did not record any statistics.

On September 24, 1974, Thaxton was traded to the Cleveland Browns for a 1975 sixth round draft pick. He proceeded to play in 12 games, starting four, for the Browns during the 1974 season, catching four passes for 71 yards while also making one interception and one fumble recovery.

On May 14, 1975, Thaxton was traded to the Oakland Raiders for an undisclosed draft pick. He was released by the Raiders on August 19, 1975.

Thaxton signed with the New Orleans Saints in 1976. He played in 11 games, starting one, for the Saints during the 1976 NFL season, recording seven receptions for 112 yards and one touchdown and eight kick returns for 185 yards. He appeared in all 14 games, starting six, in 1977 catching 14 passes for 211 yards and a touchdown.

One August 27, 1978, Thaxton was traded to the St. Louis Cardinals for a 1979 seventh round draft pick. He played in five games for the Cardinals in 1978, totaling three receptions for 31 yards and one touchdown.
