= Wayne Clark (quarterback) =

American football player (born 1947)

No. 13, 11
- Position: Quarterback

Personal information
- Born: May 30, 1947 (age 79); Oskaloosa, Iowa, U.S.
- Listed height: 6 ft 2 in (1.88 m)
- Listed weight: 203 lb (92 kg)

Career information
- High school: Buckeye Union (Buckeye, Arizona)
- College: Miami (FL)
- NFL draft: 1970: 8th round, 198th overall pick

Career history
- San Diego Chargers (1970–1973); Cincinnati Bengals (1974); Kansas City Chiefs (1975)

Career NFL statistics
- Passing attempts: 120
- Passing completions: 52
- Completion percentage: 43.3%
- TD–INT: 0–14
- Passing yards: 745
- Passer rating: 24.5
- Stats at Pro Football Reference

Wayne Maurice Clark (born May 30, 1947) is an American former professional football player who was a quarterback in the National Football League (NFL). He was selected by the San Diego Chargers in the eighth round of the 1970 NFL draft. He played college football for the United States International Gulls and Miami Hurricanes. After his career, Clark was discovered to have chronic traumatic encephalopathy.

Clark also played for the Cincinnati Bengals and Kansas City Chiefs.
