= Ron Holliday =

American football player (born 1948)

No. 81
- Position: Wide receiver

Personal information
- Born: February 12, 1948 (age 78); West Chester, Pennsylvania
- Listed height: 5 ft 9 in (1.75 m)
- Listed weight: 168 lb (76 kg)

Career information
- High school: Paoli (PA)
- College: Pittsburgh

Career history
- San Diego Chargers (1973); Philadelphia Bell (1974-1975)
- Stats at Pro Football Reference

Ron Holliday (born February 12, 1948) is a former NFL wide receiver who played one season for the San Diego Chargers. He played in 11 games for the Chargers in 1973 and caught 14 passes for 182 yards. In addition, Holliday scored one point during his NFL career; in a game against the Cleveland Browns on October 28, 1973, he ran the ball into the end zone for a successful point after touchdown.
