= Adrian Walton =

American basketball player

Adrian Walton is an American basketball player. Initially a streetball player known as "Hollywood", he was considered to be one of the last great streetball players.

Walton attended Graphic Arts High School and later Milford Academy. He played ball at Rucker Park and declined an offer to play basketball at the University of Miami. He played one year at Fordham University under Bob Hill. Walton went on to play at Riverside Community College.

Walton had stops with the United States Basketball League and the Continental Basketball Association. He later played professionally with the Albany Patroons. In 2016, he lost a 1–on–1 game to Jesse Sapp.
