= Jay Douglas (American football) =

American football player (born 1950)

No. 52
- Position: Center

Personal information
- Born: September 1, 1950 (age 76); Palco, Kansas, U.S.
- Listed height: 6 ft 6 in (1.98 m)
- Listed weight: 250 lb (113 kg)

Career information
- High school: North Little Rock (North Little Rock, Arkansas)
- College: Memphis (1969–1972)
- NFL draft: 1973: 11th round, 268th overall pick

Career history
- San Diego Chargers (1973–1974); Seattle Seahawks (1976)*
- * Offseason or practice squad member only
- Stats at Pro Football Reference

Jay Rufus Douglas (born September 1, 1950) is an American former professional football player who was a center for two seasons with the San Diego Chargers of the National Football League (NFL). He played college football for the Memphis Tigers and was selected by the Chargers in the 11th round of the 1973 NFL draft.

== Early life and college ==
Jay Rufus Douglas was born on September 1, 1950, in Palco, Kansas. He attended North Little Rock High School in North Little Rock, Arkansas.

Douglas was a member of the Memphis Tigers of the University of Memphis from 1969 to 1972 and a three-year letterman from 1970 to 1972.

== Professional career ==
Douglas was selected by the San Diego Chargers in the 11th round, with the 268th overall pick, of the 1973 NFL draft. He played in all 14 games for the Chargers during his rookie year in 1973. He appeared in all 14 games for the second consecutive season in 1974. Douglas was released by the Chargers on September 9, 1975.

Douglas signed with the Seattle Seahawks on March 23, 1976. On August 4, 1976, it was reported he had been released.
