= List of Kansas City Chiefs players =

The following lists provide an overview of notable groupings of Kansas City Chiefs players.

== Current roster ==
Kansas City Chiefs roster
Quarterbacks (QB): 6 Justin Fields; 15 Patrick Mahomes; 14 Garrett Nussmeier; 19 Chris Oladokun; Running backs (RB): 25 Emari Demercado; 10 Emmett Johnson; 42 Jaydn Ott; 24 Brashard Smith; 35 E. J. Smith; 9 Kenneth Walker III; Wide receivers (WR): 85 Andrew Armstrong; 13 Cyrus Allen; 89 Jason Brownlee; 8 Jeff Caldwell; 80 Jacob De Jesus; 7 Omari Evans; 82 Jimmy Holiday; 17 Xavier Loyd; 81 Nikko Remigio; 4 Rashee Rice; 11 Jalen Royals; 2 Tyquan Thornton; 5 Jeff Weimer; 1 Xavier Worthy; Tight ends (TE): 88 Jake Briningstool; 83 Noah Gray; 87 Travis Kelce; 46 Mason Pline; 49 Tre Watson; 12 Jared Wiley	Offensive linemen (OL): 70 Kahlil Benson RT; 66 Mike Caliendo LG; 74 Kellen Diesch T; 75 Ethan Driskell LT; 72 Chukwuebuka Godrick RT (IPP); 61 C. J. Hanson RG; 52 Creed Humphrey C; 77 Jaylon Moore RT; 64 Hunter Nourzad C; 50 Pete Nygra C; 79 Esa Pole LT; 71 Josh Simmons LT; 65 Trey Smith RG; 76 Kingsley Suamataia LG; 62 Josh Thompson G; Defensive linemen (DL): 98 Vincent Anthony Jr. DE; 91 Felix Anudike-Uzomah DE; 96 Cole Brevard DT; 97 Ashton Gillotte DE; 68 Marcus Harris DT; 54 Ethan Hurkett DE; 95 Chris Jones DT; 56 George Karlaftis DE; 93 Amari McNeill DT; 55 Omarr Norman-Lott DT; 50 Emmanuel Ogbah DE; 90 Damon Payne DT; 57 Tyreke Smith DE; 51 R Mason Thomas DE; 92 Khyiris Tonga NT; 99 Peter Woods DT	Linebackers (LB): 53 Kam Arnold OLB; 31 Jeffrey Bassa OLB; 59 Wesley Bissainthe MLB; 32 Nick Bolton MLB; 48 Cole Christiansen OLB; 43 Jack Cochrane MLB; 45 Cam Jones OLB; 44 Cooper McDonald MLB; 23 Drue Tranquill OLB; Defensive backs (DB): 22 Jadon Canady FS; 27 Chamarri Conner SS; 5 Mansoor Delane CB; 24 Kaiir Elam CB; 8 Kristian Fulton CB; 17 Alohi Gilman FS; 21 Jaden Hicks SS; 35 Kevin Knowles CB; 26 Kader Kohou CB; 34 Tanner McCalister SS; 29 Xavier Nwankpa FS; 19 D’Arco Perkins-McAllister CB; 30 Christian Roland-Wallace CB; 25 DeShon Singleton FS; 39 Melvin Smith CB; 38 L'Jarius Sneed CB; 20 Nohl Williams CB; 47 Zelmar Vedder CB; Special teams (ST): 14 Matt Araiza P; 7 Harrison Butker K; 41 James Winchester LS	Reserve: 40 Ethan Downs DE (IR); 84 John Michael Gyllenborg TE (IR); 73 Matt Waletzko RT (W/I) 90 active (1 exempt), 3 reserve As of August 21, 2026. Rookies in italics.; Roster; Depth chart; Transactions

== Chiefs quarterbacks ==
Throughout the Chiefs' near five-decade existence, there have been twelve starting quarterbacks to lead the team. Among the most prolific include Hall of Famers Len Dawson and Joe Montana, as well as superb quarterbacks of their era like Trent Green.

In the past few decades, the Chiefs have relied on veteran quarterbacks to lead their team. The last quarterback to be drafted by Kansas City that later went on to claim the starting position was Bill Kenney in 1980. Since Kenney's retirement in 1988. the Chiefs never drafted their own quarterback to develop until Brodie Croyle was drafted in 2006. When head coach Herman Edwards arrived in 2006, he stated that he was looking towards implementing younger players into his gameplan, and he was arguably looking to start at the quarterback position.

The Chiefs have also had a repeated history of backup quarterbacks that steal the spotlight. Mike Livingston led the Chiefs to the playoffs in their 1969 season after starting quarterback Len Dawson was injured for the majority of the year. Most recently, Rich Gannon took over for the injured Elvis Grbac in the 1997 season, but was revoked of the job in favor of Grbac's return for the playoffs. The Chiefs lost in the playoffs to the eventual Super Bowl champion Denver Broncos. A similar incident occurred in the 2006 season and playoffs when Trent Green and the Chiefs' offense failed to get a first down in the first forty-two minutes of the game. Backup quarterback Damon Huard, whom led the Chiefs on a 5–2 record in Green's absence, never played a down in the playoff loss to—coincidentally—the eventual Super Bowl champion Indianapolis Colts.

== Super Bowl IV (1969) champions ==
Kansas City Chiefs 1969 final roster
**Quarterbacks**: 16 **Len Dawson**; 12 Tom Flores; 10 Mike Livingston; 15 Jacky Lee; **Running backs**: 21 **Mike Garrett** HB; 38 Wendell Hayes; 45 **Robert Holmes** FB; 23 Paul Lowe; 14 Ed Podolak; **Wide receivers**: 25 **Frank Pitts** SE; 1 Noland Smith; 30 **Gloster Richardson** FL; 89 **Otis Taylor** FL; **Tight ends**: 84 **Fred Arbanas**; 32 Curtis McClinton; 81 Mickey McCarty	**Offensive linemen**: 71 **Ed Budde** G (L); 60 George Daney G; 73 **Dave Hill** T (R); 55 **E. J. Holub** C; 76 **Mo Moorman** G (R); 65 Remi Prudhomme C; 77 **Jim Tyrer** T (L); **Defensive linemen**: 87 **Aaron Brown** DE (R); 86 **Buck Buchanan** DT (R); 61 **Curley Culp** DT (L); 82 Ed Lothamer DT; 75 **Jerry Mays** DE (L); 74 Gene Trosch DE	**Linebackers**: 78 **Bobby Bell** OLB (L); 85 Chuck Hurston; 63 **Willie Lanier** MLB; 51 **Jim Lynch** OLB (R); 66 Bob Stein; **Defensive backs**: 24 Caesar Belser S; 46 **Jim Kearney** SS (L); 40 **Jim Marsalis** CB (L); 42 **Johnny Robinson** FS (R); 20 Goldie Sellers CB; 18 **Emmitt Thomas** CB (R); **Special teams**: 44 **Jerrel Wilson** P; 3 **Jan Stenerud** K; 6 **Warren McVea** HB/KR; 22 **Willie Mitchell** CB/PR	**Reserve List—Did not play**: 58 Jack Rudnay C; 88 Morris Stroud TE; Complete team roster Rookies in italics Starters in **bold** Positions in (parentheses)

== Honored players ==
=== Pro Football Hall of Famers ===
**Kansas City Chiefs Hall of Fame enshrinees**
Players
No.	Name	Position	Tenure	Inducted
78	**Bobby Bell** ^{1} ^{2}	LB	1963–1974	1983
63	**Willie Lanier** ^{1} ^{2}	LB	1967–1977	1986
16	**Len Dawson** ^{2} ^{3}	QB	1963–1975	1987
86	**Buck Buchanan** ^{1} ^{2}	DT	1963–1975	1990
3	**Jan Stenerud** ^{1} ^{2} ^{3}	K	1967–1979	1991
53	Mike Webster	C	1989–1990	1997
19	Joe Montana	QB	1993–1994	2000
32	Marcus Allen	RB	1993–1997	2003
1	Warren Moon	QB	1999–2000	2006
18	**Emmitt Thomas** ^{1} ^{2}	CB	1966–1978	2008
58	**Derrick Thomas**	LB	1989–1999	2009
77	Willie Roaf	T	2002–2005	2012
61	**Curley Culp** ^{1} ^{2} ^{3}	DT	1968–1974	2013
68	**Will Shields**	G	1993–2006	2015
8	Morten Andersen	K	2002–2003	2017
88	**Tony Gonzalez** ^{3}	TE	1997–2008	2019
24	Ty Law	CB	2006–2007	2019
42	**Johnny Robinson**^{1} ^{2}	S	1960–1971	2019
24	Darrelle Revis	CB	2017	2023
69	Jared Allen	DE	2004–2007	2025
Coaches and contributors
Name		Position	Tenure	Inducted
**Lamar Hunt**		Founder of franchise and American Football League	1960–2006	1972
Marv Levy		Head coach	1978–1982	2001
**Hank Stram** ^{1} ^{2} ^{3}		Head coach	1960–1974	2003
Bill Polian		Contributor	1978–1982	2015
Bobby Beathard		Contributor	1963, 1966–1967	2018
Dick Vermeil		Head coach	2001–2005	2022
^{1} Began career in the American Football League.^{2} Member of 1969 Super Bowl championship team.^{3} Spent majority of their career with the Chiefs (names in **bold**).

== Chiefs Hall of Fame ==
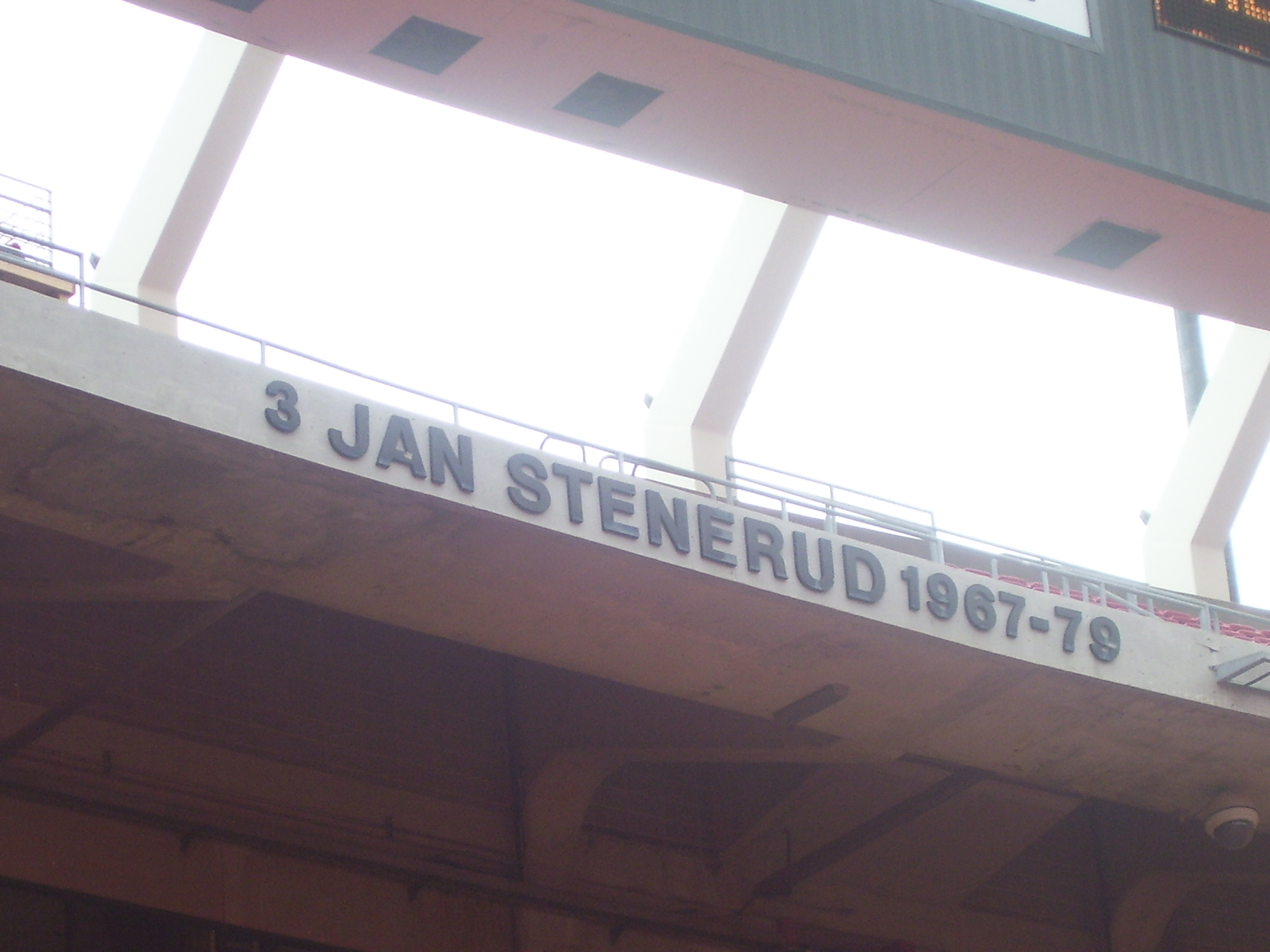
Jan Stenerud's name is forever honored at Arrowhead Stadium.

The Kansas City Chiefs feature forty-four former players and franchise contributors in their team hall of fame. Several of the team's names are featured at Arrowhead Stadium in a "ring of honor." A new member has been inducted in an annual ceremony, with the exception of the 1983 season.

1970s
1970 Lamar Hunt, team founder and owner
1971 #36 Mack Lee Hill, Running back
1972 #75 Jerry Mays, Defensive tackle
1973 #84 Fred Arbanas, Tight end
1974 #42 Johnny Robinson, Safety
1975 #88 Chris Burford, Wide receiver
1976 #55 E. J. Holub, Center/Linebacker
1977 #77 Jim Tyrer, Offensive tackle
1978 #21 Mike Garrett, Running back
1979 #16 Len Dawson, Quarterback

1980s
1980 #78 Bobby Bell, Linebacker
1981 #86 Buck Buchanan, Defensive tackle
1982 #89 Otis Taylor, Wide receiver
1983 No induction
1984 #71 Ed Budde, Guard
1985 #63 Willie Lanier, Linebacker
1986 #18 Emmitt Thomas, Cornerback
1987 Hank Stram, Coach
1988 #44 Jerrel Wilson, Punter
1989 #14 Ed Podolak, Running back

1990s
1990 #51 Jim Lynch, Linebacker
1991 #28 Abner Haynes, Running back
1992 #3 Jan Stenerud, Kicker
1993 #69 Sherrill Headrick, Linebacker
1994 #58 Jack Rudnay, Center
1995 #32 Curtis McClinton, Running back
1996 #20 Deron Cherry, Safety
1997 #73 Dave Hill, Offensive tackle
1998 #67 Art Still, Defensive end
1999 #34 Lloyd Burruss, Safety

2000s
2000 #35 Christian Okoye, Running back
2001 #58 Derrick Thomas, Linebacker
2002 #76 John Alt, Offensive tackle
2003 #59 Gary Spani, Linebacker
2004 #37 Joe Delaney, Running back
2005 Jack Steadman, team vice chairman and general manager
2006 #90 Neil Smith, Defensive end
2007 #29 Albert Lewis, Cornerback
2008 #61 Curley Culp, Defensive tackle
2009 #8 Nick Lowery, Place kicker

2010s
2010 Marty Schottenheimer, Coach
2011 #31 Kevin Ross, Cornerback
2012 #68 Will Shields, Guard
2013 #26 Gary Barbaro, Defensive back
2014 #31 Priest Holmes, Running back
2015 #24 Gary Green, Cornerback
2016 #49 Tony Richardson, Fullback
2017 #88 Carlos Carson, Wide Receiver
2018 #88 Tony Gonzalez, Tight End
2019 #54 Brian Waters, Guard
2023 #54 Dante Hall, Wide Receiver

== Missouri Sports Hall of Fame ==
- Lamar Hunt, team Founder and Owner
- Marty Schottenheimer, Coach
- Hank Stram, Coach
- Dick Vermeil, Coach
- #32 Marcus Allen, Running Back
- #84 Fred Arbanas, Tight End
- #78 Bobby Bell, Linebacker
- #71 Ed Budde, Guard
- #20 Deron Cherry, Safety
- #16 Len Dawson, Quarterback
- #31 Priest Holmes, Running Back
- #46 Jim Kearney, Safety
- #63 Willie Lanier, Linebacker
- #32 Curtis McClinton, Halfback
- #54 Curt Merz, Guard
- #76 Mo Moorman, Guard
- #35 Christian Okoye, Running Back
- #14 Ed Podolak, Running Back
- #49 Tony Richardson, Fullback
- #42 Johnny Robinson, Safety
- #70 Jerome Sally, Nose Tackle
- #68 Will Shields, Guard
- #90 Neil Smith, Defensive End
- #59 Gary Spani, Linebacker
- #3 Jan Stenerud, Kicker
- #67 Art Still, Defensive End
- #89 Otis Taylor, Wide Receiver
- #18 Emmitt Thomas, Cornerback

== Other notable alumni ==
- #26 Gary Barbaro, DB
- #4 Steve Fuller, QB
- #24 Fred "The Hammer" Williamson, DB
- Bobby Hunt (1962 Dallas Texans - 1967 Kansas City Chiefs; Defensive Back, and a member of the American Football League Hall of Fame.)
- #9 Bill Kenney, QB
- #99 Ernie Ladd (Defensive tackle; 1967–1968. Also played for the San Diego Chargers and the Houston Oilers, and a member of the American Football League Hall of Fame.)
- #61 Curley Culp, DT
- #8 Nick Lowery, K
- #63 Bill Maas, DT
- #32 Curtis McClinton (scored a touchdown in Super Bowl I)
- #32 Tony Reed, RB
- #86 J. T. Smith, WR
- #83 Stephone Paige, WR
- #17 Elmo Wright and the Elmo Wright Touchdown Dance
- #10 Mike Livingston, QB (Led the Chiefs in their championship 1969 season while Len Dawson was injured)
- #31 Kevin Ross, DB
- #61 Tim Grunhard, C
- #38 Kimble Anders, RB
- #17 Steve DeBerg, QB
- #40 James Hasty, CB
- #49 Tony Richardson, FB (1995–2005, a major factor in the Chiefs' offensive success)
- #77 Willie Roaf, T (2002–2005, dubbed the "heart and soul" of Kansas City's offense by fans during the Dick Vermeil era)
- #12 Rich Gannon, QB (1995–1998, backup quarterback under Steve Bono and Elvis Grbac)
- #88 Morris Stroud, TE (1970–1974), second tallest person to ever play in the NFL.
- #68 Will Shields, G (1993–2006), never missed a game in his entire 14-year career all with the Chiefs and a major part of the Chiefs' offensive successes in the 1990s and early 2000s
- #88 Tony Gonzalez, TE, finished his career with the Atlanta Falcons
