= 65 Toss Power Trap =

Notable American football play in Super Bowl IV

Minnesota Vikings (NFL) (12–2)	Kansas City Chiefs (AFL) (11–3)
7	23
Head coach: Bud Grant	Head coach: Hank Stram
	1	2	3	4	Total
MIN	0	0	7	0	7
KC	3	13	7	0	23
- Date: January 11, 1970
- Stadium: Tulane Stadium; New Orleans, Louisiana
- Favorite: Vikings by 13.5
- Referee: John McDonough
- Attendance: 80,562

TV in the United States
- Network: CBS
- Announcers: Jack Buck and Pat Summerall

65 Toss Power Trap is an American football play that gained notoriety as the first touchdown scored by the Kansas City Chiefs in their victory over the Minnesota Vikings in Super Bowl IV on January 11, 1970. The play was designed by head coach Hank Stram and has since been remembered as one of the most iconic play calls in Super Bowl history, particularly due to Stram’s sideline commentary captured by NFL Films.

== Background ==
During the 1969 season, the Chiefs relied on a balanced offense built around a powerful running game and efficient passing from quarterback Len Dawson. Stram, known for his innovative play-calling, often employed misdirection and trap blocking schemes to exploit aggressive defensive lines.

Super Bowl IV matched the AFL champion Chiefs against the NFL champion Vikings, whose defense was nicknamed the “Purple People Eaters” and was widely considered the best unit in football. The Vikings entered the game as heavy favorites.

== Super Bowl IV ==
The Chiefs began the game strong, both holding the Vikings scoreless and mounting three drives into Minnesota territory, but up to this point had been held to three field goals by Jan Stenerud, including a successful 48-yard field goal attempt that broke the record for the longest successful field goal attempt in a Super Bowl. In the previous drives, the Vikings seemed to have regained momentum by intercepting Len Dawson at their own 7-yard line, but were then held to a three-and-out, which led to another Chiefs field goal and a 9-0 lead.

On the ensuing kickoff, Vikings kick returner Charlie West fumbled the ball, and Chiefs center Remi Prudhomme recovered it at the Minnesota 19-yard line. Defensive end Jim Marshall sacked Dawson for an 8-yard loss on the first play of the drive; however, a 13-yard run on a draw play by running back Wendell Hayes and a 10-yard reception by Otis Taylor gave the Chiefs a first down at the Vikings' 4-yard line. On first and second down, the Vikings defense held firm, holding Mike Garrett to a loss of a yard on 1st down and Dawson to no gain on second down, setting up a crucial third down.

== The play ==
On third down, the Chiefs faced a goal-line situation at the Vikings’ 5-yard line. Stram called "65 Toss Power Trap":

- Dawson took the snap and faked a handoff.
- Running back Mike Garrett received the ball on a quick toss.
- Guard Mo Moorman pulled to lead the blocking on the right side.

The misdirection left a gap in the Vikings’ defensive front, Minnesota defensive lineman Paul Dickson briefly got a hand on Garrett causing him to slightly stumble, but Garrett regained his balance and ran into the end zone for a touchdown. This score and a successful extra point attempt gave the Chiefs a 16–0 lead. They never trailed, ultimately winning the game 23–7.

== Legacy ==
The play became famous in part due to Stram’s animated sideline commentary. In the game, Stram became the first head coach recorded by NFL Films while wired with a personal microphone in the Super Bowl. In these recordings, Stram can be heard enthusiastically communicating the play call to Gloster Richardson (who then delivered the call into the huddle), “65 Toss Power Trap - it might pop wide open, Rich”, followed by “Is that there, Rich? Nice going, baby!” and “Did I tell you that baby was there? Yes sir, boys! Woo! 65 Toss Power Trap!" after Garrett scored.

The play was remembered by journalists as the defining play of the game. The call has since been replayed in numerous NFL Films productions and highlight reels, symbolizing both the Chiefs’ upset victory and the merger-era triumph of the American Football League. In 2015, the play was named as the most iconic play in Chiefs history by The Sporting News. NFL Films has named the play as number 74 in a list of the 100 greatest NFL plays of all time.

The Chiefs organization has continued to reference the play in franchise lore, particularly through the naming of their in-house media production agency as "65 Toss Power Trap Productions".

== See also ==
- Super Bowl IV
- History of the Kansas City Chiefs
