= Lloyd C. A. Wells =

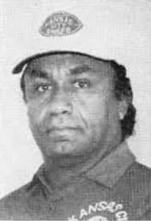
Wells, c. 1974

Lloyd C. A. "Judge" Wells (1924 - September 12, 2005), was an American football scout, sports photographer and civil rights activists in the world of sports.

A Texas Southern University graduate, Wells was the epitome of the American Football League's enlightened policies towards recruiting black athletes. Wells, while he was a sports photographer, accomplished the desegregation of fan seating at amateur and professional events in Houston, and was an advocate for civil rights and for black athletes throughout his life.

As a part-time scout for the AFL's Kansas City Chiefs, he convinced Grambling defensive tackle Buck Buchanan to sign with the Chiefs in 1963. He also recruited defensive backs Jim Kearney and Emmitt Thomas, and linebacker Willie Lanier. Buchanan, Thomas and Lanier are in the Pro Football Hall of Fame. After becoming pro football's first black full-time scout, in a famous "babysitting" incident in 1965, he managed to get wide receiver Otis Taylor away from the NFL's Dallas team. Wells' success was a catalyst for the older league to try to get up to speed in signing talented black players from small colleges, including historically black colleges and universities as the AFL had done from its inception. Contrary to the popular misconception fostered by the NFL, most of these stellar draft signings did not come after the "common draft" instituted with the AFL-NFL merger, but well before that time, in open competition with the NFL.

No less than eight of Wells' recruits made All-AFL during their pro careers. He had a major hand in staffing the Chiefs to enable them to win the fourth and last world championship game between the champions of the AFL and the NFL, in which they defeated the Vikings 23–7 in Super Bowl IV.

In 2023, he was named as one of the twelve finalists in the Coach/Contributor ballot for the Pro Football Hall of Fame.

== See also ==
- Other American Football League personalities
- List of sports desegregation firsts
- Race and sports
