= George Daney =

American football player (1946–1990)

No. 60
- Position: Guard

Personal information
- Born: September 2, 1946; Washington, Pennsylvania, U.S.
- Died: February 15, 1990 (aged 43); Raytown, Missouri, U.S.
- Listed height: 6 ft 4 in (1.93 m)
- Listed weight: 240 lb (109 kg)

Career information
- High school: Avella (Avella, Pennsylvania)
- College: UTEP
- NFL draft: 1968: 1st round, 22nd overall pick

Career history
- Kansas City Chiefs (1968–1974)

Awards and highlights
- Super Bowl champion (IV); AFL champion (1969)

Career NFL/AFL statistics
- Games played: 97
- Games started: 29
- Fumble recoveries: 2
- Touchdowns: 1
- Stats at Pro Football Reference

George Anthony Daney (September 2, 1946 – February 15, 1990) was an American professional football guard. He played college football at the University of Texas at El Paso. He was drafted in the first round of the joint 1968 AFL/NFL draft by the Kansas City Chiefs.

== College career ==
Daney committed to Texas Western College of the University of Texas (Texas Western) out of high school. His sophomore year he helped lead the Miners to a Sun Bowl victory over cross-state team TCU. His senior the school changed its name to its current name, the University of Texas at El Paso, frequently shortened to UTEP. That season, he helped lead the Miners to another Sun Bowl victory over Ole Miss.

== Professional career ==
He was drafted by the Kansas City Chiefs with the 22nd overall pick in the first round of the joint 1968 AFL/NFL draft. He won Super Bowl IV in 1970. He spent his entire seven year career with the Chiefs playing for Hall of Fame coach Hank Stram every season of his career.

== Post-football career ==
Following his retirement from football, Daney worked in advertising.

== Death ==
He died from carbon monoxide poisoning on February 15, 1990. His wife found him dead in their garage. He had been working on his car.
