= John McDonough (American football referee) =

American football referee (1916–1978)

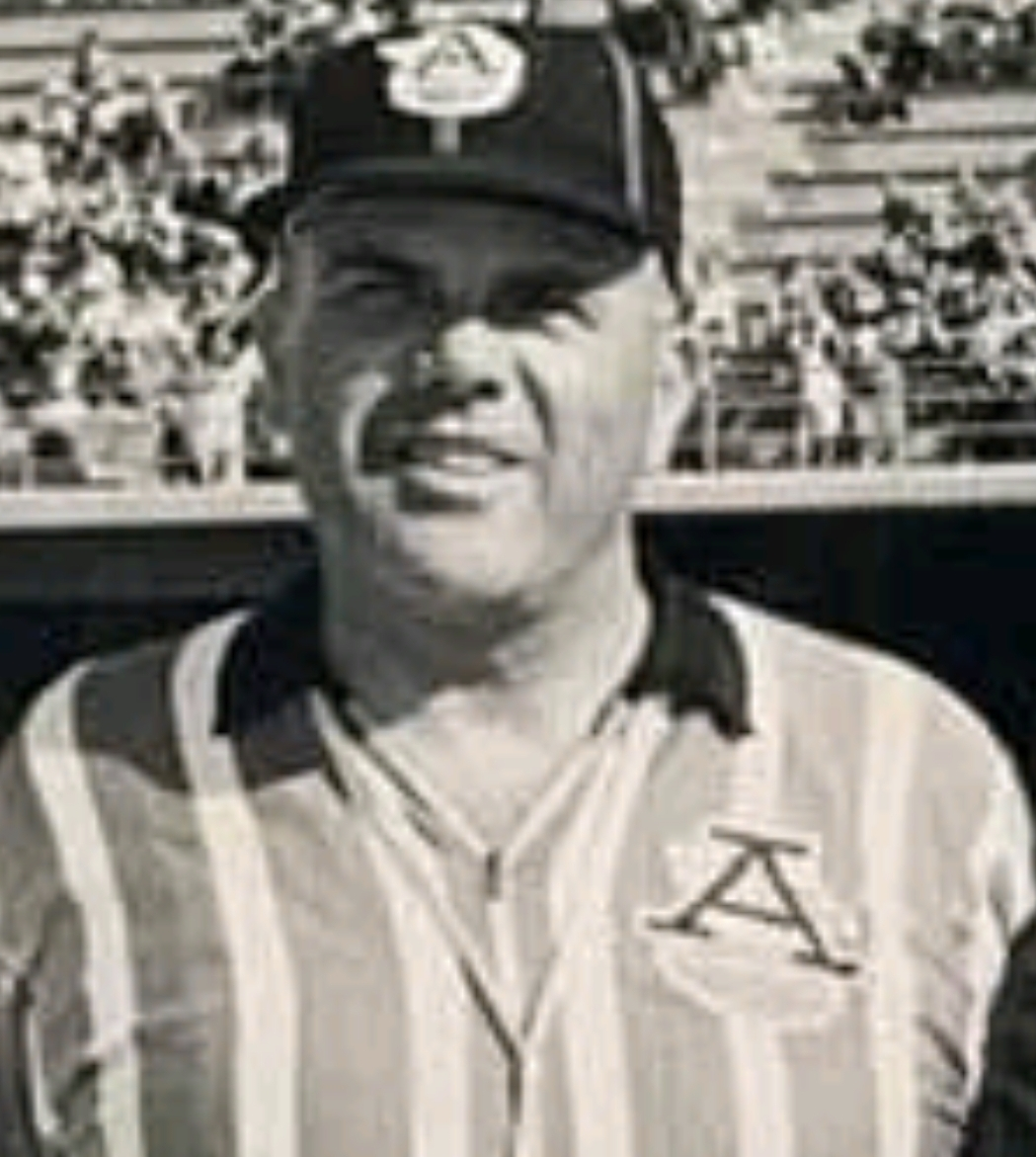
- Born: John McDonough; August 15, 1916
- Died: July 10, 1978 (aged 61); Santa Ana, California, U.S.
- Education: Stanford (1940)
- Occupations: American football referee (AFL, NFL 1960-1974), Administrator (WFL 1974-75)
- Spouse: Beth Lamb (1942-his death)
- Children: 2 (Deveda: 1944-2018, Joel)

John T McDonough (August 15, 1916 – July 10, 1978) was an American football referee. After graduating from Stanford University in 1940, he served as an assistant superintendent of Orange County, CA Schools. McDonough wore number 11 for all 10 years of the AFL's existence, through the NFL merger, retiring after the 1973 season. Cal Lepore, the head linesman on Bob Frederic's crew, was named McDonough's successor as referee.

His 240 game assignments included Super Bowl IV, in which he performed the coin toss, and the 1971 AFC divisional playoff game between the Dolphins and Chiefs, which is the longest game in NFL history.

McDonough was the first referee to call a roughing the passer penalty in a Super Bowl, flagging Minnesota Vikings defensive end Jim Marshall on a third quarter hit against the Chiefs' Len Dawson. On the next play, Otis Taylor took a short pass from Dawson down the right sideline to a 46-yard touchdown which cemented Kansas City's 23-7 victory.

McDonough's final NFL game was December 16, 1973 at the Yale Bowl in New Haven, Connecticut. The Vikings defeated the New York Giants 31-7.

After retiring from the field, McDonough served as the head of officials for both years of the World Football League.

McDonough wrote a book about his experiences. Don't Hit Him, He's Dead was published in 1978.

McDonough died of cancer on July 10, 1978.
