= Caesar Belser =

American football player (1944–2016)

No. 24, 50
- Positions: Linebacker, Safety

Personal information
- Born: September 13, 1944; Montgomery, Alabama, U.S.
- Died: March 5, 2016 (aged 71); Hurst, Texas, U.S.
- Listed height: 6 ft 0 in (1.83 m)
- Listed weight: 205 lb (93 kg)

Career information
- High school: Montgomery (AL) Carver
- College: Arkansas AM&N
- NFL draft: 1966: 10th round, 145th overall pick

Career history
- Kansas City Chiefs (1968–1971); Edmonton Eskimos (1972–1973); San Francisco 49ers (1974)

Awards and highlights
- Super Bowl champion (IV); AFL champion (1969)

Career NFL/AFL statistics
- Fumble recoveries: 3
- Stats at Pro Football Reference

Caesar Edward Belser (September 13, 1944 – March 5, 2016) was an American professional football linebacker and safety who played in the American Football League (AFL) and the National Football League (NFL). He is the father of Jason Belser.

He played college football at the Arkansas AM&N, and professionally in the AFL and the NFL for the Kansas City Chiefs and later the San Francisco 49ers.

Belser died on the weekend of March 5, 2016, according to his family. He was 71. He was battling lung cancer, as well as neurological damage from playing football. Per his family's wishes, his brain will be donated to scientific research.

== See also ==
- List of American Football League players
