= Paul Dixon =

Paul Dixon may refer to:

- Paul Dixon (baseball) (1907–1994), Negro league baseball player
- Paul Dixon (entertainer) (1918–1974), American TV show host
- Paul Dixon (footballer, born 1960), footballer from Northern Ireland (Burnley, Glentoran)
- Paul Dixon (footballer, born 1986), Scottish footballer (Dundee, Dundee United, Huddersfield Town, Scotland)
- Paul Dixon (ice hockey) (born 1973), British ice hockey player
- Paul Dixon (rugby league) (born 1962), English rugby league footballer
- Paul Dixon (musician) (born 1989), British singer-songwriter
- Paul Rand Dixon (1913–1996), chairman and Commissioner of the United States Federal Trade Commission

== See also ==
- Paul Dickson (disambiguation)
