= Earsell Mackbee =

American football player (1941–2009)

No. 46
- Position: Cornerback

Personal information
- Born: January 15, 1941; Brookhaven, Mississippi, U.S.
- Died: November 9, 2009 (aged 68); Vallejo, California, U.S.
- Listed height: 6 ft 1 in (1.85 m)
- Listed weight: 195 lb (88 kg)

Career information
- High school: Vallejo (Vallejo, California)
- College: Utah State (1964)
- NFL draft: 1965: undrafted

Career history
- Minnesota Vikings (1965–1969); Los Angeles Rams (1971)*
- * Offseason or practice squad member only

Awards and highlights
- NFL Champion (1969)

Career NFL statistics
- Interceptions: 15
- Fumble recoveries: 4
- Touchdowns: 2
- Stats at Pro Football Reference

Earsell Mackbee (January 15, 1941 – November 9, 2009) was an American professional football player.

Mackbee was born in Brookhaven, Mississippi and served as an airman in the United States Air Force. He graduated from Utah State University, where he starred as a cornerback. He played five seasons in the National Football League, all with the Minnesota Vikings. Mackbee was a starting cornerback on the Vikings’ Purple People Eaters defense and made 15 interceptions in his career. He started in Super Bowl IV but was injured while unsuccessfully attempting a tackle on a play that resulted in Otis Taylor running down the sidelines for a 46-yard touchdown to close out the scoring with 82 seconds remaining in the third quarter. Mackbee explained, “He had used a hitch and go earlier. This was just a hitch. I had gone up tight on him a lot. Earlier I had a pinched nerve in my shoulder and as I hit him my shoulder went numb and I lost him.”

After retiring from the NFL in 1970, Mackbee became an entrepreneur, opening a chain of restaurants and other business ventures. He also worked as a counselor and advisor for City Inc, a Minneapolis outreach and educational program.

In 2005, Mackbee suffered a stroke and was thereafter in a hospice. On October 16, 2009, his condition deteriorated, and his family rallied to fulfill his last wish of returning him to his roots in Vallejo, California. Ten days after donations allowed his family to charter a plane to fly him back to Vallejo, Mackbee died on November 9, 2009. He is interred at Sacramento Valley National Cemetery.
