= Chuck Hurston =

American football player (1942–2015)

No. 85, 64
- Positions: Defensive end, Linebacker

Personal information
- Born: November 9, 1942; Columbus, Georgia, U.S.
- Died: November 4, 2015 (aged 72); Duluth, Georgia, U.S.
- Listed height: 6 ft 6 in (1.98 m)
- Listed weight: 240 lb (109 kg)

Career information
- High school: Jordan Vocational (Columbus)
- College: Auburn
- NFL draft: 1965: 15th round, 206th overall pick
- AFL draft: 1965: 12th round, 91st overall pick

Career history
- Kansas City Chiefs (1965–1970); Buffalo Bills (1971)

Awards and highlights
- Super Bowl champion (IV); 2× AFL champion (1966, 1969)

Career NFL/AFL statistics
- Sacks: 8.5
- Stats at Pro Football Reference

Charles Frederick Hurston (November 9, 1942 – November 3, 2015) was an American professional football defensive end and linebacker who played seven seasons from 1964 to 1971. He was selected by the American Football League (AFL)'s Buffalo Bills in the 12th round of the 1965 AFL draft. After winning the AFL Championship with the Chiefs in 1966, he started for them in the first AFL-NFL World Championship Game. He was also with the 1969 Chiefs who won Super Bowl IV. He died of cancer in 2015.
