= Paul Dickson =

Paul Dickson may refer to:

- Paul Dickson (writer) (born 1939), American writer
- Paul Dickson (American football) (1937–2011), American football player

== See also ==
- Paul Dixon (disambiguation)
