= Mo Moorman =

American football player (born 1945)

No. 76
- Position: Guard

Personal information
- Born: July 24, 1945 (age 81); Louisville, Kentucky, U.S.
- Listed height: 6 ft 5 in (1.96 m)
- Listed weight: 252 lb (114 kg)

Career information
- High school: St. Xavier (Louisville)
- College: Kentucky (1964); Texas A&M (1965-1967)
- NFL draft: 1968: 1st round, 19th overall pick

Career history
- Kansas City Chiefs (1968–1973)

Awards and highlights
- Super Bowl champion (IV); AFL champion (1969); First-team All-American (1966); Second-team All-American (1967); First-team All-SWC (1966)

Career NFL/AFL statistics
- Games played: 72
- Games started: 68
- Fumble recoveries: 5
- Stats at Pro Football Reference

Maurice "Mo" Moorman (born July 24, 1945) is an American former professional football player who was a guard for the Kansas City Chiefs of the American Football League (AFL) and National Football League (NFL). He played collegiately for the Texas A&M Aggies, and went to the AFL's Chiefs as a first-round pick in the 1968 AFL draft. After winning the AFL championship with the Chiefs in 1969, he started for them in their victory over the NFL's Minnesota Vikings in the fourth and last AFL-NFL World Championship Game. He wore jersey number 76. He threw the key "trap" block on the famous touchdown play in the game, "65 Toss Power Trap."

Following his AFL/NFL career, Moorman returned to his home city of Louisville, Kentucky and started Mo Moorman Distributing Company. The distributing company featured Coors Light, Zima, Corona, and other imports such as Stella and Dos Equis. In 2007, Mo sold the company to River City Distributing Company giving River City over 80% of the market share in the city of Louisville.

== See also ==
- Other American Football League players
