= Curley Culp =

American football player (1946–2021)

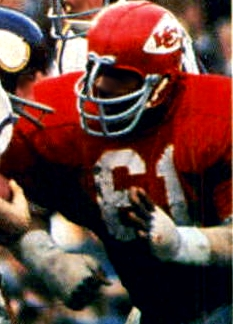
- Culp playing with the Chiefs in Super Bowl IV

No. 61, 78, 77
- Position: Defensive tackle

Personal information
- Born: March 10, 1946; Yuma, Arizona, U.S.
- Died: November 27, 2021 (aged 75); Pearland, Texas, U.S.
- Listed height: 6 ft 2 in (1.88 m)
- Listed weight: 265 lb (120 kg)

Career information
- High school: Yuma Union
- College: Arizona State
- NFL draft: 1968: 2nd round, 31st overall pick

Career history
- Denver Broncos (1968)*; Kansas City Chiefs (1968–1974); Houston Oilers (1974–1980); Detroit Lions (1980–1981)
- * Offseason or practice squad member only

Awards and highlights
- Super Bowl champion (IV); AFL champion (1969); NFL Defensive Player of the Year (1975); First-team All-Pro (1975); 4× Second-team All-Pro (1971, 1977–1979); 6× Pro Bowl (1969, 1971, 1975–1978); Kansas City Chiefs Hall of Honor; First-team All-American (1967); WAC Lineman of the Year (1967)

Career NFL/AFL statistics
- Forced fumbles: 6
- Fumble recoveries: 13
- Sacks: 68.5
- Stats at Pro Football Reference
- Pro Football Hall of Fame

Medal record

Collegiate Wrestling

Representing the Arizona State Sun Devils

NCAA Division I Championships
Gold medal – first place	1967 Kent	Heavyweight

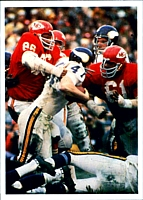
Culp (right) stopping a Vikings running play during Super Bowl IV

Curley Culp (March 10, 1946 – November 27, 2021) was an American professional football player who was a defensive tackle in the American Football League (AFL) and National Football League (NFL). He played college football at Arizona State University, where he was also an NCAA heavyweight wrestling champion. He played football in the AFL for the Kansas City Chiefs in 1968 and 1969, and in the NFL for the Chiefs, Houston Oilers, and Detroit Lions. He was an AFL All-Star in 1969 and a six-time Pro Bowler.

== Early life ==
Curley Culp grew up in Yuma, Arizona, the youngest of 13 children including a twin sister, Shirley. At Yuma Union High School, he was a standout first in football and then in wrestling, winning Arizona high school wrestling state titles at heavyweight in 1963 and 1964. He was recruited to Arizona State University to play both sports.

== College career ==
=== Wrestling ===
At Arizona State, Culp amassed a 84–11–1 record, three Western Athletic Conference championships, and was the 1967 NCAA heavyweight champion, winning the Gorriaran Award for scoring the most pins at the NCAA Division I Wrestling Championships.

=== Football ===
Under legendary Arizona State football coach Frank Kush, Culp played nose guard, including on the 1967 team that allowed opponents an average of only 79.8 yards per game. He won All-America honors in football, as well as wrestling.

== Professional career ==
=== Kansas City Chiefs ===
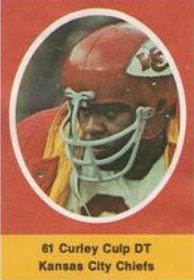
1972 Sunoco stamp for Culp for Kansas City Chiefs

The Denver Broncos drafted Culp in the second round of the 1968 NFL Draft, but considered him too small for the defensive line at 6'1" and 265 lbs. After trying him at guard, they dealt him during training camp to the Kansas City Chiefs in exchange for a fourth-round draft pick (Mike Schnitker). He played for Kansas City for seven seasons, appearing in 82 games, achieving nine sacks in 1973 with nine QB takedowns, and also recovering five fumbles during his career with the team.

Culp's role as a nose tackle in the pros actually took root in Super Bowl IV, where he was a starting defensive tackle. Chiefs coach Hank Stram, in an attempt to nullify the Minnesota Vikings' quick outside rushing attack, decided to line Culp directly nose-to-nose with Vikings center, Mick Tingelhoff. The smaller Tingelhoff could not block Culp one-on-one and had to be helped by the other linemen. This freed teammates Buck Buchanan, Willie Lanier, and other Chiefs defenders to get into the Vikings offensive backfield and shut down their running game. The effectiveness of the Chiefs' defensive game plan helped continue the growing popularity of the 3–4 scheme in the 1970s from the college to pro ranks.

=== Houston Oilers ===
When Culp arrived in Houston, Bum Phillips was the defensive coordinator for Sid Gillman. He had convinced the head coach to try a 3-4 defense, employing three down linemen and four linebackers, eschewing the standard 4–3 fronts of the day. In basically an exchange of defensive tackles who had threatened to jump to the World Football League, the Oilers acquired Culp and a first-round draft choice in 1975 from the Chiefs for John Matuszak on October 22, 1974. Both Culp and Matuszak had signed contracts with the Southern California Sun and Shreveport Steamer respectively. It became known as one of the most lopsided trades in NFL history, made worse for the Chiefs when the Oilers selected Robert Brazile with the draft pick.

Culp was so strong he required two and three players to block him, opening lanes for Elvin Bethea, Gregg Bingham, Ted Washington, Sr. and later Brazile. Houston won seven of their remaining nine games after Curley came to Houston. As Phillips later said, "Curley made (the 3–4 defense) work. He made me look smart."

Playing as a nose tackle, Culp suffered injuries, and age began to take its toll. Midway through the 1980 season, Culp was released and was claimed by Detroit, where he stayed an additional season before closing out his 14-year NFL career.

So great was his impact that the Sporting News named Culp to the All-Century teams of both the Kansas City and Houston/Tennessee franchises. Hall-Of-Famer center Jim Otto of the Raiders called him "perhaps the strongest man I ever lined up against".

== Legacy ==
Culp is regarded as the NFL's greatest nose tackle. He played a total of 13 seasons in the AFL/NFL, and was selected to a total of six AFL All-Star Games or Pro Bowls. He was twice honored as the Associated Press Defensive Player of the Week. In 1975, he won All-Pro honors and was chosen NFL Defensive Player of the Year by the Newspaper Enterprise Association and as such received the George Halas Trophy.

He was inducted into the Arizona State University Sports Hall of Fame at its inception in 1975, and was named Greatest Athlete in the history of Arizona during the state's centennial in 2006.

Culp is a member of the Kansas City Chiefs 25-Year All-Time Team, and in March 2008 was inducted into the Chiefs Hall of Fame.

On August 3, 2013, he was inducted into the Pro Football Hall of Fame.

== Death ==
Culp announced on November 16, 2021, that he had been diagnosed with Stage IV pancreatic cancer. He died eleven days later at the age of 75.

== See also ==
- List of American Football League players
