= Mike Garrett =

American football player and athletic director (born 1944)

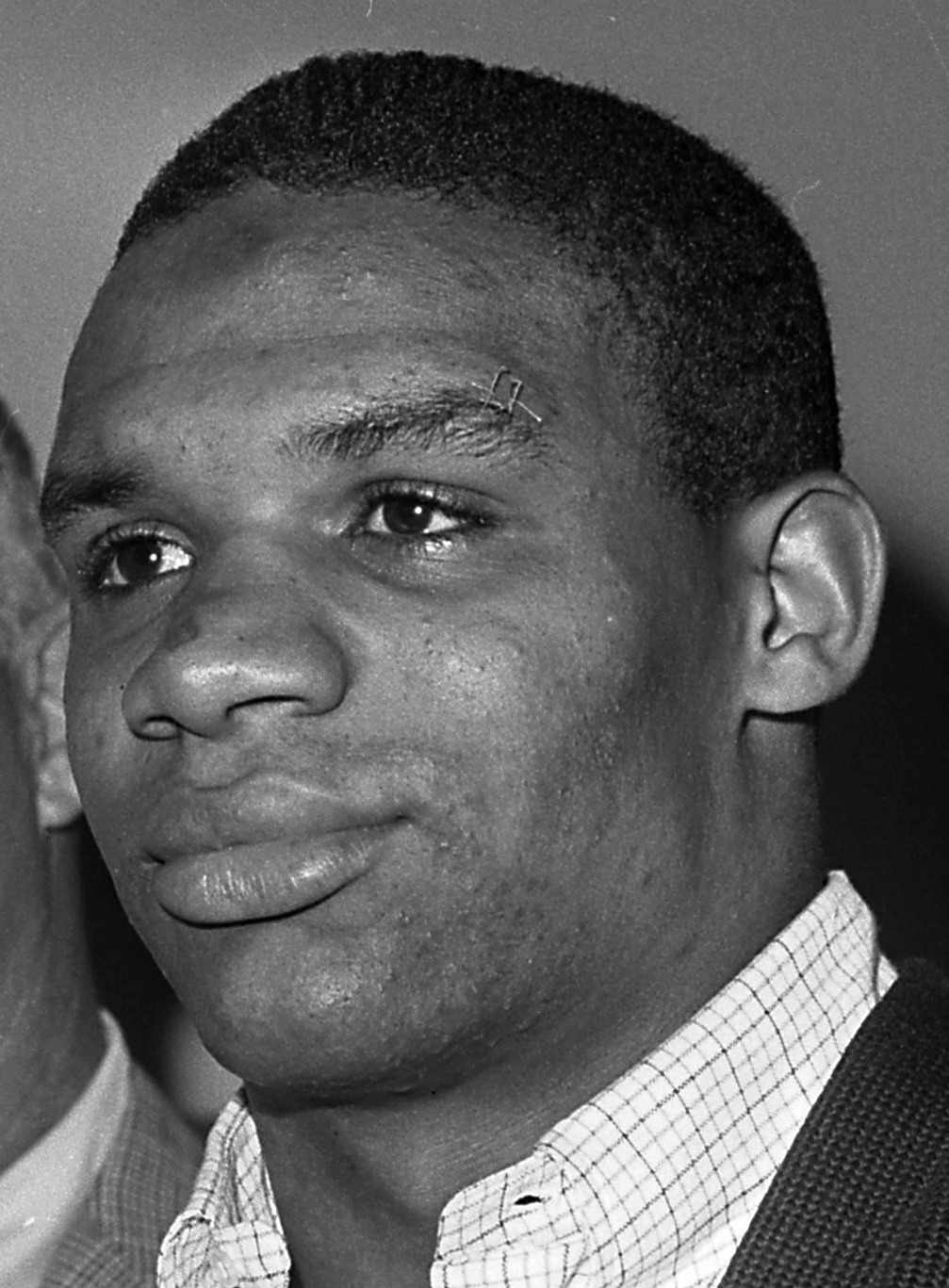
- Garrett in 1965

No. 21, 25, 20
- Position: Running back

Personal information
- Born: April 12, 1944 (age 82); Los Angeles, California, U.S.
- Listed height: 5 ft 9 in (1.75 m)
- Listed weight: 191 lb (87 kg)

Career information
- High school: Theodore Roosevelt (Los Angeles)
- College: USC (1963–1965)
- NFL draft: 1966: 2nd round, 18th overall pick
- AFL draft: 1966: 20th round, 178th overall pick

Career history

Playing
- Kansas City Chiefs (1966–1970); San Diego Chargers (1970–1973)

Operations
- USC (1993–2010) Athletic director; Langston (2013–2015) Athletic director; Cal State Los Angeles (2016) Athletic director

Awards and highlights
- Super Bowl champion (IV); 2× AFL champion (1966, 1969); 2× First-team All-AFL (1966, 1967); Second-team All-AFL (1969); 2× AFL All-Star (1966, 1967); Kansas City Chiefs Hall of Honor; Heisman Trophy (1965); UPI Player of the Year (1965); Chic Harley Award (1965); Pop Warner Trophy (1965); Unanimous All-American (1965); Third-team All-American (1964); 3× First-team All-PCC (1963, 1964, 1965); USC Trojans No. 20 retired

Career AFL/NFL statistics
- Rushing yards: 5,481
- Rushing average: 4.2
- Rushing touchdowns: 35
- Receptions: 238
- Receiving yards: 2,010
- Receiving touchdowns: 13
- Stats at Pro Football Reference
- College Football Hall of Fame

Michael Lockett Garrett (born April 12, 1944) is an American former professional football player who was a running back for eight seasons in the National Football League (NFL) and American Football League (AFL) with the Kansas City Chiefs and San Diego Chargers. He played college football for the USC Trojans, winning the Heisman Trophy in 1965.

From 1993 until 2010 he served as the athletic director at the University of Southern California (USC). Then, he became the athletic director at California State University, Los Angeles (Cal State LA) in 2015.

== Early life ==
Garrett was born on April 12, 1944, in Los Angeles, California, the fourth of six children. He was a resident of the Maravilla housing projects. Garrett graduated from Theodore Roosevelt High School in Los Angeles, where he played defensive back and running back on the school's football team. As a senior, he rushed for 1,467 yards and scored 153 points. In 1961, he was named Los Angeles City Player of the Year.

== College career ==
Garrett had wanted to play college football at the University of California at Los Angeles (UCLA), but the relationship did not work out. Instead, he attended the University of Southern California (USC), where coach John McKay was creating an offense featuring the tailback.

A two-time All-American (including a unanimous selection in 1965), Garrett set numerous NCAA, Pac-8 Conference and USC records in his career by amassing a then unheard of 3,221 yards, while scoring 30 touchdowns. Garrett also led the nation in rushing in 1965 with 267 carries for 1,440 yards. He also caught 36 passes, returned 43 punts (two for touchdowns of 87 and 74 yards), returned 30 kickoffs and threw 6 passes. Two of his passes went for touchdowns. He was the first USC player to run for over 1,000 yards since 1927. In 1965, he ran for over 100 yards in all but one game (against Notre Dame).

Garrett was awarded the 1965 W. J. Voit Memorial Trophy as the outstanding football player on the Pacific Coast. He won the Heisman Trophy after the 1965 regular season. In 1965, he also won the Pop Warner Award, was named Athlete of the Year by the YMCA, and North American Athlete by the Helms Foundation. In 1985, he was voted into the College Football Hall of Fame. In 2015, he was inducted into the California Sports Hall of Fame.

His nickname was "Iron Mike".

Garrett signaled the dawn of the "Tailback U" era, where USC produced a stream of top tailbacks including Heisman winners O. J. Simpson (1968), Charles White (1979) and Marcus Allen (1981), as well as Heisman runners-up Anthony Davis (1974) and Ricky Bell (1976). He set the benchmark for all the USC tailbacks who followed him.

Garrett was a brother of the Alpha Kappa chapter of the Alpha Phi Omega fraternity while a student at USC. He is a member of The Pigskin Club of Washington, D.C. National Intercollegiate All-American Football Players Honor Roll.

== Professional career ==
In 1966, the AFL and NFL still had separate drafts and competed for players. Garrett had also been drafted by the Pittsburgh Pirates to play baseball, and there were rumors that he had an interest in playing for the Los Angeles Rams if they would make him their first pick, or that he had already signed with the Oakland Raiders. So even though he had won the Heisman Trophy, he was not taken until the 20th round of the 1966 AFL draft by the Kansas City Chiefs (178th out of 181 players chosen). The Rams took him with the second pick of the second round in the 1966 NFL draft, but he chose the Chiefs.

Garrett went on to play in the American Football League (AFL) with Kansas City Chiefs from 1966 to 1969, and in 1970 for the Chiefs in the National Football League after the leagues merged. During the 1970 season, he was traded to the San Diego Chargers and remained with them until 1973.

Garrett was a two-time AFL All-Star, in 1966 and 1967, and was selected first team All-AFL in 1967. He played in the first AFL–NFL World Championship Game, now referred to as Super Bowl I, with the Chiefs after the 1966 season. He contributed 17 rushing yards, three receptions for 28 yards, and two kickoff returns for 43 yards in their loss. Garrett won a World Championship ring with the Chiefs in Super Bowl IV, the last AFL–NFL World Championship Game before the AFL–NFL merger, when the AFL's Chiefs beat the NFL's Vikings, 23–7. Garrett was the top rusher of Super Bowl IV with 11 carries for 39 yards and a touchdown, also catching two passes for 25 yards and returning a kickoff for 18 yards. His touchdown came on head coach Hank Stram's iconic 65 Toss Power Trap play call. Garrett led the Chiefs in rushing three times.

After being traded to San Diego during the 1970 season, he rushed for nearly 600 yards in 1971 and over 1,000 yards in 1972, his highest total since 1967 and second highest for his career.

In his eight professional football seasons, Garrett rushed for 5,481 yards, caught 238 passes for 2,010 yards, returned 14 kickoffs for 323 yards, and returned 39 punts for 235 yards. Overall, Garrett gained a total of 8,049 yards and scored 49 touchdowns (35 rushing, 13 receiving, 1 punt return). With 1,087 yards for Kansas City in 1967 and 1,031 yards with San Diego in 1972, Garrett became the first professional football player to rush for over 1,000 yards with two different franchises.

In 1978, he was inducted into the Chiefs Hall of Honor. In 2018, he was inducted into the Missouri Sports Hall of Fame.

=== Interest in professional baseball ===
Garrett had been a .300 hitter on USC's baseball team. He was drafted three times by professional baseball teams. He was selected in the 41st round of the 1965 MLB draft by the Pittsburgh Pirates and by the Los Angeles Dodgers twice, in the fourth round of the 1966 MLB draft and the 35th round of the 1970 MLB draft. In June of 1970, after winning Super Bowl IV, Garrett announced he was going to give up football to play baseball for the Dodgers, a significant motivation being his wanting to be in Los Angeles. He said the Dodgers never made him a reasonable offer, and he came back to football for the 1970 season. The Chiefs traded him to San Diego early in the season. After his final game of his first year with the Chargers, after running for 125 yards and scoring two touchdowns, he again stated he was going to retire from football to play baseball for the Dodgers. Before the start of the 1971 football season, he decided it was better for him to remain in football, and signed a two-year contract with the Chargers, and retired with the Chargers at the end of those two years.

== NFL career statistics ==
Legend
	Led the league
	Won the AFL Championship
	Won the Super Bowl
**Bold**	Career high

Year	Team	Games		Rushing						Receiving					Fumbles	
Year	Team	GP	GS	Att	Yds	Avg	Y/G	Lng	TD	Rec	Yds	Avg	Lng	TD	Fum	FR
1966	KC	**14**	4	147	801	**5.4**	57.2	**77**	6	15	175	11.7	36	1	5	0
1967	KC	**14**	**14**	236	**1,087**	4.6	**77.6**	58	**9**	**46**	261	5.7	34	1	6	**3**
1968	KC	13	12	164	564	3.4	43.4	37	3	33	359	10.9	43	**3**	6	2
1969	KC	**14**	**14**	168	732	4.4	52.3	34	6	43	**432**	10.0	41	2	4	0
1970	KC	3	3	21	62	3.0	20.7	18	0	4	4	1.0	5	0	1	0
1970	SD	9	2	46	146	3.2	16.2	22	1	10	127	**12.7**	**44**	1	3	1
1971	SD	13	11	140	591	4.2	45.5	36	4	41	283	6.9	40	**3**	6	2
1972	SD	**14**	**14**	**272**	1,031	3.8	73.6	41	6	31	245	7.9	27	1	**8**	2
1973	SD	10	9	114	467	4.1	46.7	68	0	15	124	8.3	30	1	6	1
Career		104	83	1,308	5,481	4.2	52.7	77	35	238	2,010	8.4	44	13	45	11

== After professional football ==
Garrett graduated with a degree in sociology from USC. While still in college he helped found the Cool Head Program, working with youth. After his professional football career, Mike Garrett earned a Juris Doctor from Western State University College of Law in 1986, but never took the bar exam. He was the director of business development for the Great Western Forum, worked in the district attorney's office in San Diego and worked in various management positions, and was also a youth counselor. He also did color commentary for USC football telecasts.

Garrett established the East Los Angeles Youth Activities Foundation (now the Mike Garrett Foundation), in 1989. He also worked in real estate and construction firms after leaving football. He was unsuccessful in twice running for political office. In 1990, he received the NCAA's Silver Anniversary Medal for his post-collegiate activities.

In January 1993, Garrett returned to USC to become its sixth athletic director. He came under fire when he hired the heavily criticized Pete Carroll as head football coach in 2001, but was vindicated when USC returned to status as a dominant football power. In 2005, he allowed safety Darnell Bing who was at USC at the time to wear his retired number 20 for his senior season. In 2010, the USC football program was hit with severe NCAA sanctions, and USC self-imposed sanctions on its basketball program, in the wake of allegations about violations involving former USC stars Reggie Bush and O. J. Mayo. These sanctions have been criticized by some NCAA football writers, including ESPN's Ted Miller, who wrote, "It's become an accepted fact among informed college football observers that the NCAA sanctions against USC were a travesty of justice, and the NCAA's refusal to revisit that travesty are a massive act of cowardice on the part of the organization." On July 20, 2010, USC's incoming president, Max Nikias, announced major changes in the athletic department, including Garrett's replacement (effective August 3, 2010) by businessman and former USC quarterback Pat Haden.

In June 2013, Garrett became athletic director at the historically black college, Langston University, an NAIA school in Langston, Oklahoma. He resigned that position less than two years later. He is a board member for the Lott IMPACT Trophy, which is named after Ronnie Lott and is awarded annually to college football's Defensive IMPACT Player of the Year.

In 2015, he was named executive director of athletics for California State University, Los Angeles (Cal State LA). Garrett retired from the position of Executive Director of the Athletics Department at Cal State LA in 2016, in light of claims made against the school for his using language in a sexist manner (such as babe or sweetheart) with women in his department.

== See also ==
- List of American Football League players
- List of college football yearly rushing leaders
