= Gloster Richardson =

American football player (1942–2020)

No. 30, 31, 42
- Position: Wide receiver

Personal information
- Born: July 18, 1941; Greenville, Mississippi, U.S.
- Died: February 27, 2020 (aged 78); Chicago, Illinois, U.S.
- Listed height: 6 ft 2 in (1.88 m)
- Listed weight: 200 lb (91 kg)

Career information
- High school: Coleman (Greenville)
- College: Jackson State
- AFL draft: 1965: 7th round, 50th overall pick

Career history
- Kansas City Chiefs (1967–1970); Dallas Cowboys (1971); Oakland Raiders (1972) *; Cleveland Browns (1972–1974)

Awards and highlights
- 2× Super Bowl champion (IV, VI); AFL champion (1969)

Career AFL/NFL statistics
- Games played: 92
- Games started: 14
- Receptions: 92
- Receiving yards: 1,976
- Receiving touchdowns: 18
- Stats at Pro Football Reference

Gloster Van Richardson (July 18, 1942 – February 27, 2020) was a professional American football wide receiver in the National Football League (NFL) for the Kansas City Chiefs, Dallas Cowboys, and Cleveland Browns. He played college football at Jackson State College.

== Early life ==
Born and raised in Greenville, Mississippi, Richardson graduated from its Coleman High School and played college football at nearby Jackson State College. He was a two-time All-Conference choice.

== Professional career ==
=== Kansas City Chiefs ===
Richardson was selected in the seventh round (50th overall) of the 1965 AFL draft by the Kansas City Chiefs. He spent two years on the taxi squad, before making the team in 1967. His most productive season was 1968, where he made 22 receptions for 494 yards, 5 touchdowns and a 22.5-yard average per reception.

He was a part of the world championship season in 1969 which ended with a victory in Super Bowl IV. In 1970, although he started 7 games, he only posted 5 receptions for 171 yards and 2 touchdowns.

On April 18, 1971, he was traded to the defending NFC champion Dallas Cowboys in exchange for wide receiver Dennis Homan.

=== Dallas Cowboys ===
In 1971, Richardson was used mainly as a reserve player behind Bob Hayes and Lance Alworth, registering 4 starts, 8 receptions for 170 yards, 3 touchdowns and a 21.3-yard average per reception. The Cowboys won Super Bowl VI that season.

On July 31, 1972, he was traded to the Oakland Raiders in exchange for a fourth round draft choice (#97-Ken Hutcherson).

=== Oakland Raiders ===
In the 1972 preseason, Richardson became expendable with the play shown by rookie wide receivers Cliff Branch and Mike Siani. On September 11, 1972, he was traded to the Cleveland Browns in exchange for a fourth round draft choice (#93-Morris Bradshaw).

=== Cleveland Browns ===
During his three seasons with the Cleveland Browns, he was mainly used as a reserve player, making a total of 22 receptions for 448 yards and 3 touchdowns. On February 10, 1975, he announced his retirement.

== Personal life ==
Five of Richardson's brothers also played football at Jackson State. Willie Richardson became an NFL All-Pro wide receiver for the Baltimore Colts, Tom Richardson played for the Boston Patriots and Ernie Richardson for the Cleveland Browns. He died on February 27, 2020, at the age of 78.
