= Jim Kearney (American football) =

American football player (1943–2024)

No. 46
- Position: Safety

Personal information
- Born: January 21, 1943; Wharton, Texas, U.S.
- Died: August 6, 2024 (aged 81)
- Listed height: 6 ft 2 in (1.88 m)
- Listed weight: 206 lb (93 kg)

Career information
- College: Prairie View A&M
- NFL draft: 1965: 11th round, 151st overall pick

Career history
- Detroit Lions (1965–1966); Kansas City Chiefs (1967-1975); New Orleans Saints (1976)

Awards and highlights
- Super Bowl champion (IV); AFL champion (1969)

Career NFL/AFL statistics
- Interceptions: 23
- Fumble recoveries: 9
- Touchdowns: 5
- Stats at Pro Football Reference

James Lee Kearney (January 21, 1943 – August 6, 2024) was an American professional football player who was a safety for 12 seasons in the National Football League (NFL) and American Football League (AFL) from 1965 to 1976. He played college football as a quarterback for the Prairie View A&M Panthers, where one of his wide receivers was future Kansas City Chiefs teammate Otis Taylor. He was selected in the 11th round of the 1965 NFL draft by the Detroit Lions. He then played for the Chiefs from 1967 through 1975 and for the New Orleans Saints in 1976. He started in Super Bowl IV for the Kansas City Chiefs. In 1972, he tied an NFL record by returning four interceptions for touchdowns. He also led the league with 192 yards on interception returns. He wore jersey number 46 while with the Chiefs. In retirement, he took up golf and coached little league football in the Kansas City area. Jim taught science for many years at Washington High School in Kansas City, Kansas. He died on August 6, 2024, at the age of 81.

== See also ==
Other American Football League players
