= 1969 American Football League Championship Game =

Coordinates: 37.752°N 122.201°W

1969 AFL Championship Game
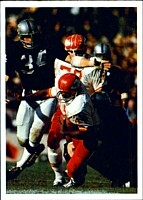
- Chiefs running back Robert Holmes (center) rushing against the Raiders in the championship game.
Kansas City Chiefs (Western runner-up) (11–3)	Oakland Raiders (Western Champion) (12–1–1)
17	7
Head coach: Hank Stram	Head coach: John Madden
	1	2	3	4	Total
KC	0	7	7	3	17
OAK	7	0	0	0	7
- Date: January 4, 1970
- Stadium: Oakland–Alameda County Coliseum; Oakland, California
- Favorite: Oakland by 4 to 5½ points
- Attendance: 54,544

TV in the United States
- Network: NBC
- Announcers: Curt Gowdy, Kyle Rote

Location in the United States

The 1969 AFL Championship Game was the tenth and final championship game of the American Football League, and the league's final game prior to its merger with the National Football League on February 1, 1970.

The game was held on January 4, 1970, at the Oakland-Alameda County Coliseum between the Western Division champion Oakland Raiders (12–1–1) and the division's second-place team, the Kansas City Chiefs (11–3). The two teams had the best records in the AFL regular season and both had won divisional playoff games two weeks earlier to advance to the championship. Oakland had swept the two hard-fought regular season games between the two teams, were favored by 4 to 5½ points, and had taken seven of the last eight meetings.

Tied at halftime, the Chiefs won 17–7 on the strength of seventeen unanswered points in the last three quarters and represented the AFL in Super Bowl IV the following week. This was the 616th and final AFL game.

== Background ==
In the one-time four-team system (held on December 20 and December 21), the Western Division champion hosted the second-place team of the Eastern Division, and the Eastern Division champion hosted the second-place Western team. The Western runner-up Chiefs upset the Jets 13–6 while the Western champion Raiders defeated the Oilers 56–7 to set up the final AFL Championship Game.

== Game summary ==
The Chiefs edged out Oakland 17–7 in a hard fought defensive struggle in which both teams combined for just 440 yards (233 for Oakland, 207 for KC) and each lost four turnovers. It was a very satisfying win for Kansas City, who had been swept by the Raiders during the season and lost 7 of their last 8 meetings, including a crushing 41–6 loss in the previous year's postseason.

The Raiders opened up the scoring with a 66-yard drive, featuring Daryle Lamonica's 24-yard completion to Warren Wells on the Chiefs' 3-yard line. Running back Charlie Smith ran the ball across the goal line on the next play, giving Oakland a 7-0 lead. Both defenses would take over the majority of the rest of the half, but with 3:24 remaining in the second quarter, Kansas City, who had only gained two first downs up to now, drove 75 yards to tie the game. Quarterback Len Dawson started off the drive with a 14-yard completion to Otis Taylor, while Robert Holmes' 8-yard run moved the ball into Raiders territory on their 42 for the first time in the game as the clock ran down to the 2-minute warning. On the next play, Dawson threw a 41-yard completion to receiver Frank Pitts. Then Wendell Hayes scored a 1-yard touchdown run to tie the game at seven at halftime.

Oakland seemed primed to respond in the third quarter with a drive to the Chiefs' 33-yard line, but in what turned out to be a crucial play, Lamonica jammed his thumb and fingers when his throwing hand struck the helmet of Chiefs defensive end Aaron Brown, and he had to miss the rest of the drive. Backup George Blanda took over and tried to take the team the rest of the way to the end zone, but a few players later, defensive back Emmitt Thomas made a clutch interception on the Chiefs' 5-yard line. Kansas City then drove 95 yards for a go-ahead score. The key play on the drive with a 35-yard reception by Taylor through triple coverage with the team facing 3rd and 13 from their own 2-yard line. Dawson later completed a 23-yard pass to Holmes on the drive, and defensive back Nemiah Wilson's pass interference penalty eventually gave Kansas City a first down on the Raiders' 7-yard line. Holmes carried the ball three straight times after that, the last a 5-yard touchdown run to put the Chiefs up 14–7.

Lamonica returned to the game in the 4th quarter, but was unable to lead the Raiders to any points, despite numerous opportunities. A promising drive into Kansas City territory was eliminated when Jim Kearney intercepted Lamonica's pass on the Chiefs 18-yard line. Two plays later, defensive end Carlton Oats recovered a fumble from Holmes on the Chiefs' 24. But on the next play, Oakland gave the ball right back with an interception to rookie cornerback Jim Marsalis. Amazingly, Oakland got the ball back on another Holmes fumble, this one recovered by linebacker Dan Conners on the Chiefs' 31. Still, the only result would be another Lamonica interception, this one to Thomas, who returned it 62 yards to the Raiders' 18-yard line, setting up Jan Stenerud's 22-yard field goal that increased Kansas City's lead to 17–7. Oakland had one last chance to get back in the game when defensive end Ike Lassiter recovered a fumble from Dawson on the Kansas City 13 with two minutes left. But Lamonica threw four straight incompletions and the Chiefs ran out the rest of the clock.

Neither quarterback had a particularly good day. Dawson completed only 7 of 17 passes for 129 yards, while Lamonica finished 15/39 for 167 yards and three interceptions. Charlie Smith was the sole offensive star of the game, with 31 rushing yards and a touchdown, along with 8 receptions for 86 yards.

Kansas City Chiefs 17, Oakland Raiders 7

Quarter	1	2	3	4	Total
Chiefs	0	7	7	3	17
Raiders	7	0	0	0	7

at Oakland–Alameda County Coliseum, Oakland, California

- Date: Sunday, January 4, 1970
- Game time: 1:00 p.m. PST
- Game weather: 45 °F (7 °C), wind 9 mph (14 km/h), relative humidity 78%
- Game attendance: 54,544
- Referee: Jack Vest
- TV announcers (NBC): Curt Gowdy, Kyle Rote
- Pro-Football-Reference.com

Game information

Scoring

- First quarter
  - OAK– Charlie Smith 3-yard rush (George Blanda kick), Raiders 7–0
- Second quarter
  - KC – Wendell Hayes 1-yard rush (Jan Stenerud kick), Tied 7–7
- Third quarter
  - KC – Robert Holmes 5-yard rush (Stenerud kick), Chiefs 14–7
- Fourth quarter
  - KC – Jan Stenerud 22-yard field goal, Chiefs 17–7

Top passers

- KC – Len Dawson – 7/17, 129 yards
- OAK – Daryle Lamonica – 15/39, 167 yards, 3 INT

Top rushers

- KC – Wendell Hayes – 8 rushes, 35 yards, 1 TD
- OAK – Hewritt Dixon – 12 rushes, 36 yards

Top receivers

- KC – Otis Taylor – 3 receptions, 62 yards
- OAK – Charlie Smith – 8 receptions, 86 yards

== Starting lineups ==
Hall of Fame inductee

Oakland	Position	Kansas City
Offense
Daryle Lamonica	QB	Len Dawson
Charlie Smith	HB	Mike Garrett
Hewritt Dixon	FB	Robert Holmes
Rod Sherman	WR	Otis Taylor
Fred Biletnikoff	FL	Frank Pitts
Billy Cannon	TE	Fred Arbanas
Bob Svihus	LT	Jim Tyrer
Gene Upshaw	LG	Ed Budde
Jim Otto	C	E. J. Holub
Jim Harvey	RG	Mo Moorman
Harry Schuh	RT	Dave Hill
Defense
Ike Lassiter	LDE	Jerry Mays
Carleton Oats	LDT	Curley Culp
Tom Keating	RDT	Buck Buchanan
Chuck Hurston	RDE	Aaron Brown
Chip Oliver	LLB	Bobby Bell
Dan Conners	MLB	Willie Lanier
Gus Otto	RLB	Jim Lynch
Nemiah Wilson	LCB	Jim Marsalis
Willie Brown	RCB	Emmitt Thomas
George Atkinson	SS	Jim Kearney
Dave Grayson	FS	Johnny Robinson

== Statistics ==
Statistics	Chiefs	Raiders
First downs	13	18
Rushing yards	86	79
Yards per carry	2.2	2.8
Passing yards	129	191
Sacked-Yards	1–8	4–37
Total yards	215	270
Fumbles-Lost	5–4	1–0
Turnovers	4	4
Penalties-Yards	5–43	5–45

== Officials ==
- Referee: Jack Vest (#15)
- Umpire: Paul Trepinski (#22)
- Head linesman: Cal Lepore (#32)
- Line judge: Aaron Wade (#65)
- Back judge: Hugh Gamber (#70)
- Field judge: Bob Baur (#58)

The AFL (and NFL) had six game officials in 1969; the seventh official, the side judge, was added in 1978.

== Players' shares ==
The Chiefs players each received $7,000 and the Raiders players about $5,000 each. With the win, the Chiefs were guaranteed an additional $7,500 each, the loser's share in the Super Bowl; the Super Bowl winners earned $15,000 each.

== Aftermath ==
The Chiefs went on to win the Super Bowl against the Minnesota Vikings, in a final showing of the AFL and its strength. Kansas City is the only team in the Super Bowl era to win the title without allowing as much as ten points in any postseason game.

The two leagues merged into one after this game, with the ten AFL teams and three NFL teams (Pittsburgh Steelers, Baltimore Colts, and Cleveland Browns) forming the American Football Conference. Super Bowl V was the first game for that conference, which the Colts won. After losing their first two appearances in 1993 and 2018, The Chiefs won the AFC Championship in 2019 and 2020. Conversely, the Raiders have appeared in eleven, winning four and losing seven; their last appearance (and win) was in 2002.

== See also ==
- Chiefs–Raiders rivalry
- 1969 AFL season
- 1969 AFL playoffs
- AFL Championship Games
- Super Bowl IV
- 1969 NFL Championship Game

Preceded by New York Jets; 1968 AFL Champions	Kansas City Chiefs; American Football League Champions; 1969	Succeeded by League's last season was 1969
