= Len Dawson =

American football player (1935–2022)

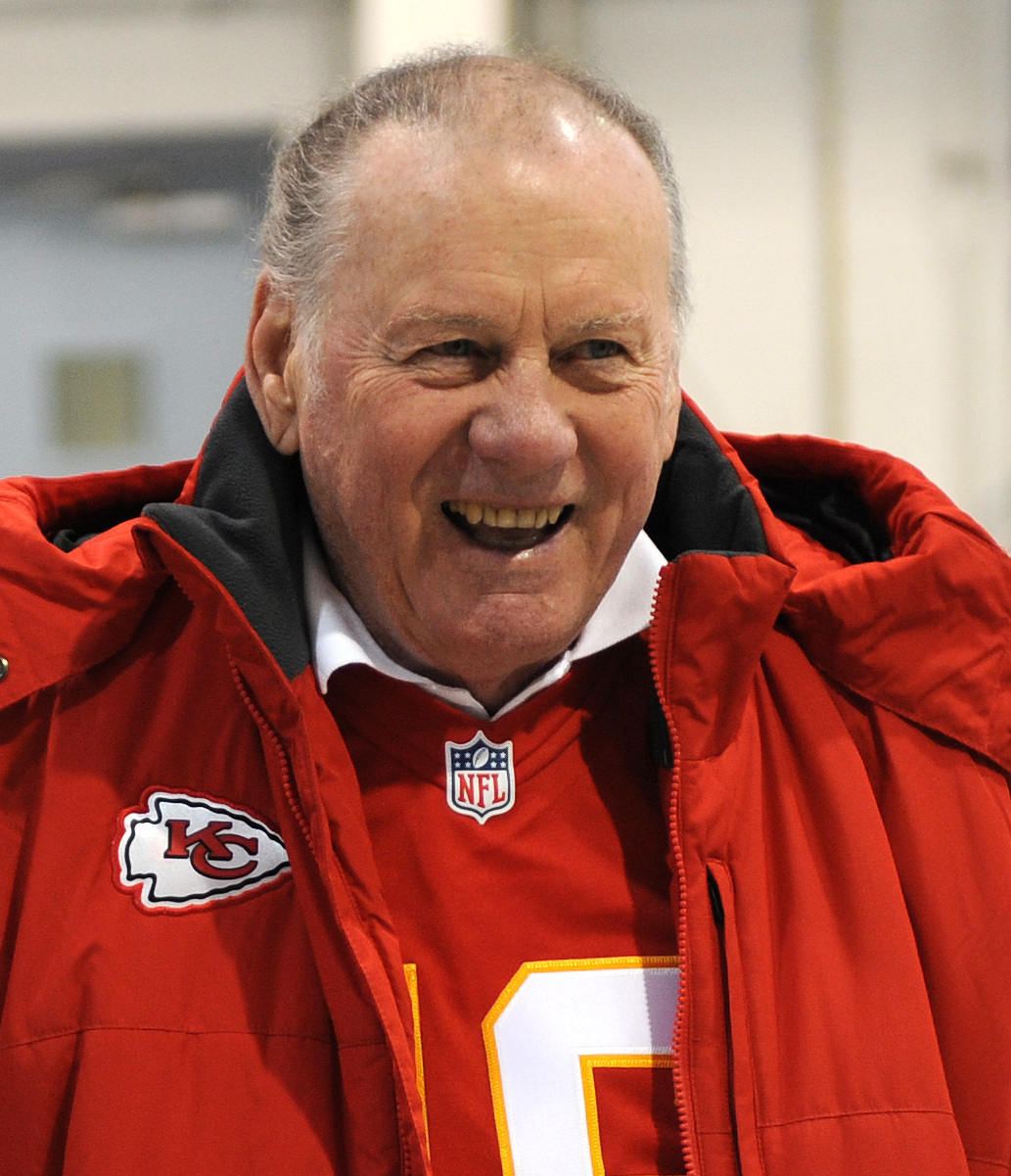
- Dawson at Whiteman Air Force Base in 2014

No. 16, 18
- Position: Quarterback

Personal information
- Born: June 20, 1935; Alliance, Ohio, U.S.
- Died: August 24, 2022 (aged 87); Kansas City, Kansas, U.S.
- Listed height: 6 ft 0 in (1.83 m)
- Listed weight: 190 lb (86 kg)

Career information
- High school: Alliance
- College: Purdue (1953–1956)
- NFL draft: 1957: 1st round, 5th overall pick

Career history
- Pittsburgh Steelers (1957–1959); Cleveland Browns (1960–1961); Dallas Texans / Kansas City Chiefs (1962–1975)

Awards and highlights
- Super Bowl champion (IV); 3× AFL champion (1962, 1966, 1969); Super Bowl MVP (IV); AFL championship MVP (1966); AFL Most Valuable Player (1962); NFL Man of the Year (1973); 2× First-team All-AFL (1962, 1966); 2× Second-team All-AFL (1964, 1968); 6× AFL All-Star (1962, 1964, 1966–1969); Pro Bowl (1971); 4× AFL passing touchdowns leader (1962, 1963, 1966, 1967); 6× AFL passer rating leader (1962, 1964–1968); 7× AFL completion percentage leader (1962, 1964–1969); NFL completion percentage leader (1975); AFL All-Time Team; Kansas City Chiefs Hall of Fame; Kansas City Chiefs No. 16 retired; Third-team AP All-American (1954); First-team All-Big Ten (1954); 2× Second-team All-Big Ten (1955, 1956)

Career AFL/NFL statistics
- Passing attempts: 3,741
- Passing completions: 2,136
- Completion percentage: 57.1%
- TD–INT: 239–183
- Passing yards: 28,711
- Passer rating: 82.6
- Stats at Pro Football Reference
- Pro Football Hall of Fame

Leonard Ray Dawson (June 20, 1935 – August 24, 2022) was an American professional football player who was a quarterback in the National Football League (NFL) and American Football League (AFL) for 19 seasons, primarily with the Kansas City Chiefs franchise. After playing college football for the Purdue Boilermakers, Dawson began his NFL career in 1957, spending three seasons with the Pittsburgh Steelers and two with the Cleveland Browns. He left the NFL in 1962 to sign with the AFL's Chiefs (then known as the Dallas Texans), where he spent the last 14 seasons of his career, and rejoined the NFL after the AFL–NFL merger.

In the AFL, Dawson led the league in completion percentage seven times, passer rating six times, and passing touchdowns four times. He was named Most Valuable Player in 1962 and selected to six AFL All-Star games. Dawson also guided the Chiefs to three AFL championships and the franchise's first Super Bowl title in Super Bowl IV, of which he was named MVP. He retired from professional football after the 1975 season and later served as the sports director at KMBC-TV in Kansas City and color analyst for the Chiefs Radio Network. His demeanor and style earned him the nickname "Lenny the Cool" from his teammates. Dawson was enshrined in the Pro Football Hall of Fame in 1987.

== Early life ==
Dawson was born in Alliance, Ohio, the son of Annie and James Dawson. He was the seventh son of a seventh son and 9th of 11 children overall. He attended Alliance High School, where he was MVP of the football team and named outstanding Ohio back of the year by the International News Service. A three-sport athlete, Dawson set school records in football and basketball, and was the first athlete in 13 years to be named first-team all-state in both sports during the same year. In 1988, he was inducted into the National High School Hall of Fame.

== College career ==
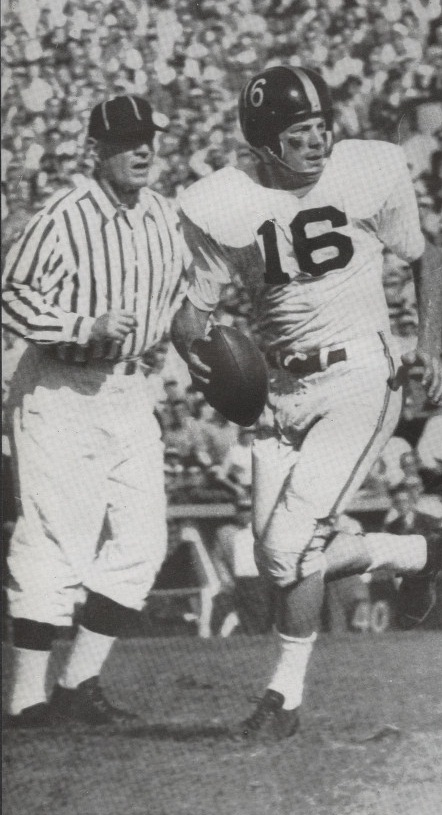
Dawson versus Wisconsin, 1956

During the recruiting process, Dawson had to choose between the Ohio State University in Columbus and Purdue University in Indiana. While he was reluctant to take over Woody Hayes' split-T offense with the Buckeyes, the true reason he selected Purdue stemmed from the rapport he had established with assistant coach Hank Stram, beginning a friendship that would last for more than a half-century.

As a sophomore in 1954, Dawson's first as the Boilermakers' quarterback, he was the NCAA's leader in pass efficiency, while also playing defense and serving as the team's kicker. He threw four touchdown passes in a 31–0 victory over Missouri, and later engineered a huge upset of Notre Dame, which had entered the contest on a 13-game winning streak.

During three seasons (1954–1956) with the Boilermakers, Dawson threw for 3,325 yards and 29 touchdowns, leading the Big Ten Conference in that category during each year. He was named third-team All-American in 1956. He was an All-Big Ten quarterback during the 1955 and 1956 seasons.

While at Purdue, Dawson was initiated into the Alpha Tau Omega fraternity.

== Professional career ==
=== Pittsburgh Steelers ===
Dawson was the fifth overall selection in the 1957 NFL draft, taken by the Pittsburgh Steelers, but he was unable to make an impact. Following his rookie season in 1957, his status became more tenuous when the Steelers acquired future Hall of Famer Bobby Layne early in the 1958 season.

=== Cleveland Browns ===
Dawson was traded to the Cleveland Browns on December 31, 1959. However, after encountering similar problems in battling Browns quarterback Milt Plum, Dawson was released after the 1961 season, having completed only 21 passes for 204 yards and two touchdowns in his five seasons of NFL play.

=== Dallas Texans/Kansas City Chiefs ===
Dawson signed with the American Football League's Dallas Texans on June 30, 1962. The move reunited him with Stram, who was beginning his third year as the Texans' head coach.

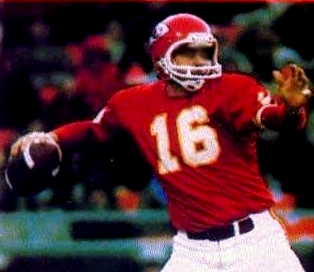
Dawson during a game against the Denver Broncos

In 1962, Dawson led the league in touchdowns and yards per attempt, and was the Sporting News' selection as the AFL MVP. He also led Dallas to the first of three league titles in a thrilling double-overtime victory over the two-time defending champion Oilers in Houston. Dawson ran a ball-control offense in the 20–17 win, and tossed a 28-yard touchdown pass to halfback Abner Haynes.

The team moved north to Kansas City and was renamed to the Chiefs in 1963.

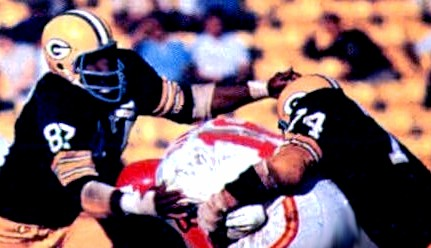
Dawson (center) being tackled by the Green Bay Packers in Super Bowl I, January 1967

A pinpoint passer, Dawson's mobility helped him flourish in Stram's "moving pocket" offense. He would win four AFL passing titles and was selected as a league All-Star six times, ending the 10-year run of the league as its highest-rated career passer. From 1962 to 1969, Dawson threw more touchdown passes (182) than any other professional football quarterback. In 1966, Dawson led the Chiefs to an 11–2–1 record and a 31–7 win over the Buffalo Bills in the AFL Championship Game to earn his team the honor of representing the AFL in Super Bowl I; he took nine sacks in the game, which still stands as a playoff record for most taken in one game. In the first championship game between the AFL and their NFL rivals, the NFL champion Green Bay Packers won easily, 35–10, but Dawson performed fairly well, completing 16 of 27 passes for 210 yards, a touchdown, and an interception. Dawson was selected by his peers as a Sporting News 1966 AFL All-League player.

Though he threw for more than 2,000 yards in each of the previous seven campaigns, Dawson's 1969 season with Kansas City would be his most memorable because of his dramatic comeback from a knee injury suffered in the season's second game. The injury was at first feared to be season-ending, but after missing five games, Dawson went on to lead the Chiefs to road playoff victories over both the defending Super Bowl champion New York Jets and the Oakland Raiders. He then capped his year with MVP accolades in Super Bowl IV, the last game ever played by an American Football League team. In the game, Dawson paced the Chiefs to a win over the NFL's heavily favored Minnesota Vikings by completing 12 of 17 passes for 142 yards, a touchdown, and an interception, and rushing for 11 yards. The performance was especially notable given that Dawson had been mistakenly linked to a gambling scandal (by an unrelated gentleman who was named Donald Dawson) in the days leading up to the game.

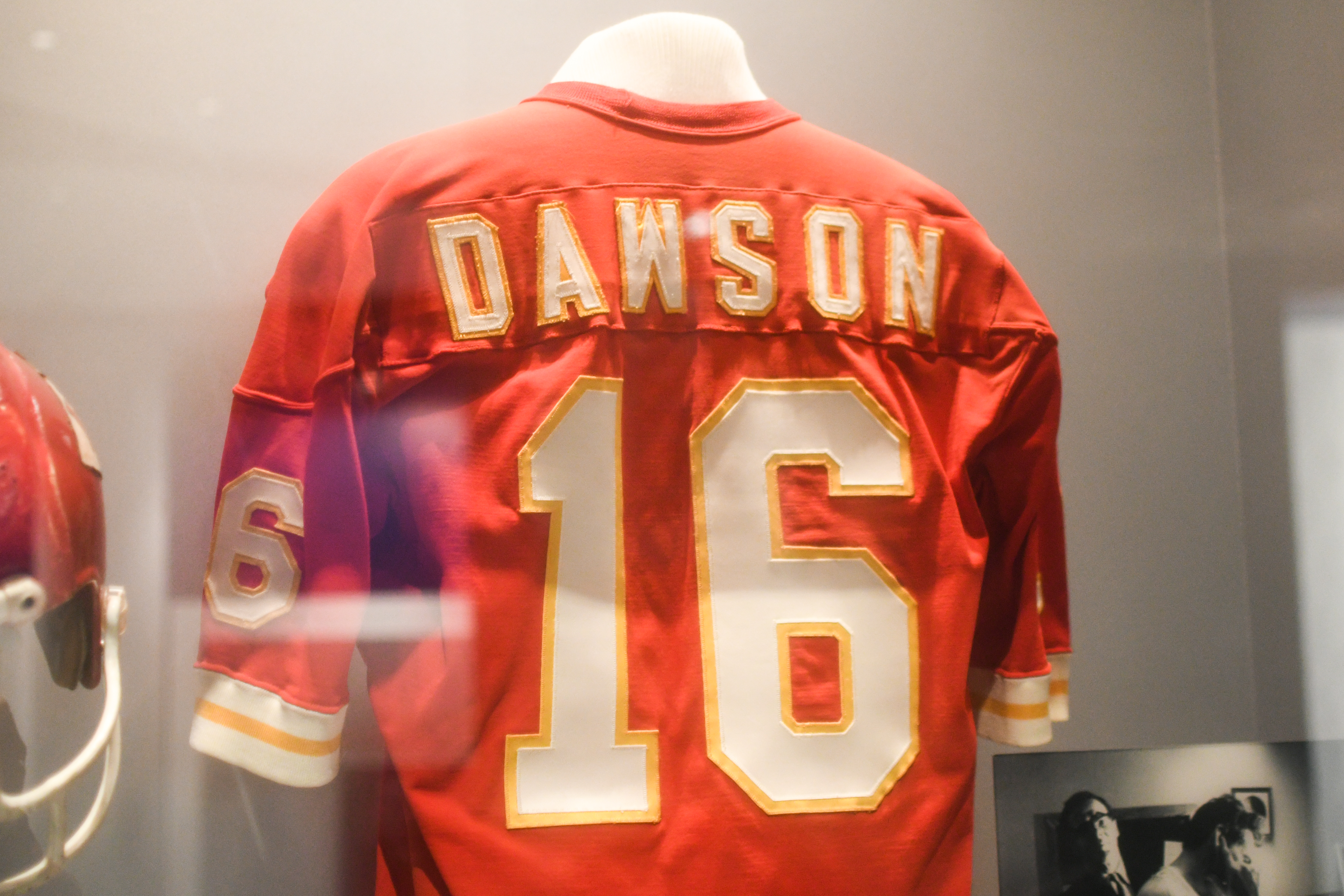
Dawson's #16 jersey exhibited at the Pro Football Hall of Fame

On November 1, 1970, the Chiefs led the Oakland Raiders 17–14 late in the fourth quarter. Facing third and long, a run by Dawson apparently sealed victory for the Chiefs, but as Dawson lay on the ground, he was speared by Raiders' defensive end Ben Davidson, who dove into Dawson with his helmet, provoking Chiefs' receiver Otis Taylor to attack Davidson. After a bench-clearing brawl, offsetting penalties were called, nullifying the first down under the rules in effect at that time. The Chiefs were obliged to punt, and the Raiders tied the game on a George Blanda field goal with eight seconds to play. Taylor's retaliation against Davidson not only cost the Chiefs a win, but Oakland won the AFC West with a season record of 8–4–2, while Kansas City finished 7–5–2 and out of the playoffs.

=== Retirement and legacy ===
Dawson announced his retirement in May 1976, shortly before turning 41. Dawson ended his career in 1975, having completed 2,136 of 3,741 passes for 28,711 yards, 239 touchdowns, and 181 interceptions. He also gained 1,293 rushing yards and nine rushing touchdowns in his career.

Dawson retired as the Chiefs all-time career leader in passing yards, passing touchdowns, completions, attempts, rushing yards by a quarterback, and rushing touchdowns by a quarterback. All of his records have since been surpassed. He also held the single-season passing touchdown record from 1964 until it was broken in 2018. He held the single-season passing yards record from 1964 until 1983. He was inducted into the Chiefs Hall of Fame in 1979 and the Pro Football Hall of Fame in 1987. His number 16 was retired by the Chiefs, and is the only number in franchise history to be worn by a single player. He was also named to the American Football League All-Time Team in 1970.

== After professional football ==
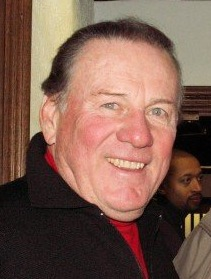
Dawson at a Purdue Alumni Game in 2019

In 1966, while still playing for the Chiefs, Dawson became the sports director at KMBC-TV in Kansas City. On March 16, 2009, Dawson announced he would step down from anchoring on a nightly basis, but would still report for KMBC during the Chiefs football season and would fill in when other anchors were on leave.

From 1977 to 2001, Dawson hosted HBO's Inside the NFL. He also worked as an analyst for NBC's AFC coverage from 1977 to 1982. From 1985 to 2017, Dawson was the color analyst for the Chiefs' radio broadcast team. In 2012, Dawson was honored with the Pete Rozelle Radio-Television Award presented by the Pro Football Hall of Fame for his longtime contributions as a sports broadcaster. At the beginning of his final season as the Chiefs radio analyst, the Chiefs named their broadcast booth at Arrowhead Stadium after Dawson. When he retired after the 2017 season, he had spent 58 years with the Texans/Chiefs organization.

In 1979, Dawson was enshrined in the Kansas City Chiefs Hall of Fame, followed by induction into the Pro Football Hall of Fame in 1987 and Purdue's Intercollegiate Athletics Hall of Fame in 1996. In 2008, he was awarded the Walter Camp Distinguished American Award.

In 2006, Dawson appeared in the NFL Network documentary America's Game: The Super Bowl Champions chronicling the 1969 Kansas City Chiefs season.

Dawson teamed with Depend in 1998 to encourage men to visit their doctors and be screened for prostate cancer.

== Personal life and death ==
Dawson was married to his high school sweetheart from 1954 until her death in 1978. He had two children. He later remarried and remained married until his death.

In 1991, Dawson was diagnosed with prostate cancer.

On August 12, 2022, Dawson's family announced that he had entered hospice care at the University of Kansas Medical Center in Kansas City, Kansas. He died on August 24 at the age of 87. He had been one of the last living members of the Chiefs franchise who dated back to its time in Dallas.

The Chiefs wore a decal with the number 16 on their helmets for the entire 2022 season in honor of Dawson. Before their first offensive play of the preseason game the day after his death, the Chiefs lined up in a huddle popularized by Dawson, where the quarterback stands in front of the other 10 offensive players instead of standing in the middle with the players making a circle around him.

== Career statistics ==
Legend
	TSN AFL MVP/POTY
	Super Bowl MVP
	AFL champion
	AFL & Super Bowl champion
	Led the league
**Bold**	Career high

Year	Team	Games			Passing								
Year	Team	GP	GS	Record	Cmp	Att	Pct	Yds	Avg	Lng	TD	Int	Rtg
1957	PIT	3	1	0–1	2	4	50.0	25	6.3	15	0	0	69.8
1958	PIT	4	0	—	1	6	16.7	11	1.8	11	0	2	0.0
1959	PIT	12	0	—	3	7	42.9	60	8.6	32	1	0	113.1
1960	CLE	2	0	—	8	13	61.5	23	1.8	23	0	0	65.9
1961	CLE	7	1	1–0	7	15	46.7	85	5.7	17	1	3	47.2
1962	DAL	14	14	11–3	189	310	61.0	2,759	8.9	**92**	29	17	98.3
1963	KC	14	13	5–7–1	190	352	54.0	2,389	6.8	82	19	19	77.5
1964	KC	14	14	7–7	199	354	56.2	**2,879**	8.1	72	**30**	18	89.9
1965	KC	14	12	6–4–2	163	305	53.4	2,262	7.4	67	21	14	81.3
1966	KC	14	14	11–2–1	159	284	56.0	2,527	8.9	89	26	10	**101.7**
1967	KC	14	14	9–5	**206**	**357**	57.7	2,651	7.4	71	24	17	83.7
1968	KC	14	13	11–2	131	224	58.5	2,109	**9.4**	**92**	17	9	98.6
1969	KC	9	7	5–2	98	166	59.0	1,323	8.0	55	9	13	69.9
1970	KC	14	12	5–5–2	141	262	53.8	1,876	7.2	61	13	14	71.0
1971	KC	14	13	9–3–1	167	301	55.5	2,504	8.3	82	15	13	81.6
1972	KC	14	12	7–5	175	305	57.4	1,835	6.0	44	13	12	72.8
1973	KC	8	6	3–2–1	66	101	65.3	725	7.2	48	2	5	72.4
1974	KC	14	8	3–5	138	235	58.7	1,573	6.7	84	7	13	65.8
1975	KC	12	5	1–4	93	140	**66.4**	1,095	7.8	51	5	4	90.0
Career		211	159	94–57–8	2,136	3,741	57.1	28,711	7.7	92	239	183	82.6

== See also ==
- List of NCAA major college football yearly passing leaders
- List of American Football League players
- List of Super Bowl MVPs
- List of Super Bowl starting quarterbacks
