= Otis Taylor (American football) =

American football player (1942–2023)

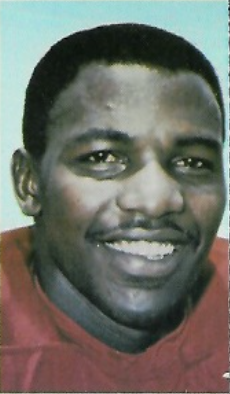
- Taylor in 1969

No. 89
- Position: Wide receiver

Personal information
- Born: August 11, 1942; Houston, Texas, U.S.
- Died: March 9, 2023 (aged 80); Kansas City, Missouri, U.S.
- Listed height: 6 ft 3 in (1.91 m)
- Listed weight: 215 lb (98 kg)

Career information
- High school: Worthing (Houston)
- College: Prairie View A&M
- NFL draft: 1965: 15th round, 203rd overall pick
- AFL draft: 1965: 4th round, 29th overall pick

Career history
- Kansas City Chiefs (1965–1975)

Awards and highlights
- Super Bowl champion (IV); 2× AFL champion (1966, 1969); AFL championship MVP (1969); UPI AFC Player of the Year (1971); 2× First-team All-Pro (1971, 1972); First-team All-AFL (1966); Second-team All-AFL (1967); 2× Pro Bowl (1971, 1972); AFL All-Star (1966); AFL receiving touchdowns co-leader (1967); NFL receiving yards leader (1971); Kansas City Chiefs Hall of Fame; First-team Little All-American (1964)

Career AFL/NFL statistics
- Receptions: 410
- Receiving yards: 7,306
- Receiving touchdowns: 57
- Stats at Pro Football Reference

Otis Taylor Jr. (August 11, 1942 – March 9, 2023) was an American professional football wide receiver who played in the American Football League (AFL). He played college football for the Prairie View A&M Panthers and was selected by the Kansas City Chiefs in the fourth round of the 1965 AFL draft. He was also selected in the 15th round of the 1965 NFL draft by the Philadelphia Eagles, but he chose to play in the AFL for the Chiefs where he would spend his entire career.

== Early life ==
Taylor was born on August 11, 1942, in Houston to Lillian Lee and Otis Taylor Sr. He was raised by his mother and older sister, Florence (Odell). Odell would care for him in later life during a long period of illness and decline. Taylor attended Evan E. Worthing High School, where he was the football team's quarterback, played basketball, and ran track. He was an All-State quarterback in football.

== College career ==
Taylor attended Prairie View A&M University on a basketball scholarship, but became a star receiver on its football team. Taylor was originally the team's quarterback until his sophomore year, when he was replaced by Jim Kearney, who would go on to play safety in the AFL and National Football League (NFL) as Taylor's teammate in Kansas City.

In 1963, the football team won the Southwestern Athletic Conference (SWAC), and was runner up in the 1963 National Association of Intercollegiate Athletics (NAIA) championship game. Prairie View was the first HBCU team to participate in the NAIA playoffs. It was undefeated in the regular season and first playoff game (10–0), before reaching the final game against St. Johns University of Minnesota, losing 33–27 in the Camellia Bowl.

Taylor had 42 touchdown catches in four years, and as a senior he was named an NAIA first-team All-American. The Pittsburgh Courier selected him to its second-team All American squad. A year earlier, Taylor was selected as an NAIA District 6B All-American.

As a basketball player, he was inspired by NBA legend Elgin Baylor. The quickness and agility he developed as a basketball player made him a better football player. In college basketball, he once faced future NBA great Willis Reed (who attended Grambling State University), and played him even.

Taylor was inducted into Prairie View's Sports Hall of Fame in 1992. In 1972, the school retired his number 17, a first in Prairie View's history. In 2016, he was inducted into the Black College Football Hall of Fame.

== Professional career ==
Taylor was selected in the fourth round of the 1965 AFL draft (Chiefs) and the 15th round of the NFL draft, by the Philadelphia Eagles. After a famous "baby-sitting" incident, in which Taylor "escaped" from NFL scouts, he was signed for the Chiefs by their legendary scout Lloyd Wells.

Future Hall of Fame Chiefs' coach Hank Stram brought Taylor along slowly as a rookie, until he had to start Taylor for an injured Chris Burford in the season's last three games. He had played mainly on special teams before that. Taylor caught 16 of his 26 receptions that year in those last three games. He had five touchdown catches overall, and averaged 17.2 yards per reception, fourth best in the AFL. He was second among all rookies in receptions, three behind George Sauer Jr., who started 11 games compared to Taylor's four.

He followed that up in 1966 by leading the AFL with a 22.4 yards per reception average, finishing second in total receiving yards (1,297), as well as having the longest pass reception of the season (89 yards). At season's end, he was voted first-team All-AFL by the Associated Press (AP), Newspaper Enterprise Association (NEA) and United Press International (UPI), and was selected for the 1966 AFL All-Star team.

In 1967, Taylor tied for the AFL league lead in receiving touchdowns with 11, tied for fourth in receptions (59), and was fourth in receiving yards (958). After the AFL-NFL merger, he led the NFL in receiving yards in 1971 with 1,110. He made the AFC-NFC Pro Bowl twice and in 1971 was named Consensus All-Pro by the AP, NEA, the Pro Football Writers Association (PFWA) and Pro Football Weekly. The PFWA also named him first-team All-Pro for the 1972 season, and the UPI named him first-team All-Conference.

As of December 2025, Taylor ranks in the Chiefs' all-time list in receptions (6th, 410), receiving yards (3rd, 7,306), receiving touchdowns (3rd, 57), and yards per game (9th, 56.2 ). He was also an excellent downfield blocker.

Taylor combined with running back Robert Holmes for what was at the time the longest reception in Chiefs history in 1969 when he caught a pass from quarterback Mike Livingston for 79 yards, then lateraled to Holmes, who carried it another 14 yards for a touchdown.

Arguably Taylor's most memorable highlight from that season came in the fourth and final AFL-NFL World Championship Game on January 11, 1970, Super Bowl IV. After the Vikings scored for the first time and made it a 16–7 game, Taylor caught a quick pass from Len Dawson, escaped a tackle attempt by Earsell Mackbee, faked out Karl Kassulke, and ran down the sidelines for a 46-yard touchdown to close out the scoring with 82 seconds remaining in the third quarter. The Chiefs won a 23–7 upset over the NFL champion Minnesota Vikings which, prior to Super Bowl IV, were thought of as heavy favorites before gametime.

Taylor suffered a car accident in June of 1974 that saw him suffer a muscle strain of his neck and lower back. Taylor was plagued by trouble with his knees by 1975, right down to having excess fluid in preseason camp that made him unable to run. He appeared in the season opener but on October 11, he was placed on injured reserve, ending his season. In May of 1976, with the team seeking to get younger, he was traded to the Houston Oilers (despite his wish to be traded to be traded to the New Orleans Saints, where teammate Buck Buchanan was an assistant to Hank Stram). He was cut by the team, having never played a down for the team.

"Otis made my job easy," Chiefs quarterback and Hall of Famer Len Dawson said. "If you got the pass to Otis, you knew he'd catch it." By 1971, Taylor had felt he was not particularly appreciated for his accomplishments as a player, noting that as "a black man, I can't talk. I can't express myself. I can't do anything." He also noted that he had not been asked to endorse anything, not even a dog food commercial (he also noted himself as someone would be so happy to do one that he would "eat the dog food"). When he retired in 1975, Taylor was tied for 17th all-time in receiving touchdowns and one of 31 players with 50 receiving touchdowns in NFL history.

The Professional Football Researchers Association named Taylor to the PFRA Hall of Very Good Class of 2006. He was inducted into the Chiefs Ring of Honor in 1982.

=== Ben Davidson incident ===
On November 1, 1970, the Chiefs led the Oakland Raiders 17–14 late in the fourth quarter, and a long run for a first-down run by Dawson apparently sealed victory for the Chiefs in the final minute when Dawson, as he lay on the ground, was speared by Raiders' defensive end Ben Davidson, who dove into Dawson with his helmet, provoking Taylor to attack Davidson.

After a bench-clearing brawl, offsetting penalties were called, nullifying the first down under the rules in effect at that time. The Chiefs were obliged to punt, and the Raiders tied the game on a George Blanda field goal with eight seconds to play. Davidson's hit against Dawson not only cost the Chiefs a win, but helped Oakland win the AFC West with a season record of 8–4–2, while defending world champion Kansas City finished 7–5–2 and out of the playoffs. The very next season, the rule for offsetting personal foul penalties was changed to separate penalties during the play, and penalties after the play. The rule change was largely due to this play.

=== Jack Del Rio incident ===
After his time as a player had come to a close, Taylor became a scout for the Kansas City Chiefs. During the 1987 NFL Player's strike, Taylor was arriving at Arrowhead Stadium and was assaulted by Jack Del Rio, who was a new player to the organization in 1987 and was striking with his teammates. Del Rio mistook Taylor for a replacement player and was told Taylor was actually a Chiefs legend and retired player by fans who had come upon the assault. He later pressed charges against Del Rio and the two settled out of court. Del Rio went on to coach in the NFL, including 12 years as a head coach.

== NFL/AFL career statistics ==
Legend
	Won the Super Bowl
	Won the AFL championship
	Led the league
**Bold**	Career high

=== Regular season ===
Year	Team	Games		Receiving				
Year	Team	GP	GS	Rec	Yds	Avg	Lng	TD
1965	KAN	14	4	26	446	17.2	48	5
1966	KAN	14	14	58	**1,297**	**22.4**	**89**	8
1967	KAN	14	13	**59**	958	16.2	71	**11**
1968	KAN	11	5	20	420	21.0	67	4
1969	KAN	11	7	41	696	17.0	79	7
1970	KAN	13	10	34	618	18.2	59	3
1971	KAN	14	14	57	1,110	19.5	82	7
1972	KAN	14	12	57	821	14.4	44	6
1973	KAN	14	14	34	565	16.6	46	4
1974	KAN	10	9	24	375	15.6	64	2
1975	KAN	1	0	0	0	0.0	0	0
		130	102	410	7,306	17.8	89	57

=== Playoffs ===
Year	Team	Games		Receiving				
Year	Team	GP	GS	Rec	Yds	Avg	Lng	TD
1966	KAN	2	2	9	135	15.0	31	**1**
1968	KAN	1	1	4	117	**29.3**	55	0
1969	KAN	3	3	**11**	**217**	19.7	**61**	**1**
1971	KAN	1	1	3	12	4.0	6	0
		7	7	27	481	17.8	61	2

== Personal life ==
Taylor and his wife of 35 years, Regina (Hill) Taylor, had a son, Otis Taylor III.

After retiring as a player, Taylor was a scout for 11 years with the Chiefs. He was upset when he was not considered for an assistant coaching job with the Chiefs in 1981. He was inducted into the Missouri Sports Hall of Fame in 1994. There is an historical marker to him in Kansas City, Missouri, where Municipal Stadium once stood.

Taylor served on Boards and commissions throughout the Greater Kansas City area, and as a community ambassador for Blue Cross/Blue Shield. He played a critical role in establishing the Derrick Thomas/Neil Smith Third and Long Foundation, dedicated to fighting illiteracy, from 1999 to 2004. After Kansas City football legend Thomas unexpectedly died in 2000, Taylor provided support and leadership to ensure Thomas's mission continued.

Starting in 2007, the Otis Taylor Award, as part of the Thomas A. Simone Awards, has been presented annually to the best wide receiver or tight end in Kansas City-area high school football.

== Failing health and death ==
In 1969, Taylor began experiencing seizures. In 1990, he was diagnosed with Parkinson's disease dementia, which eroded his health over the following decades, until he was bedbound and largely incommunicative in his last years. His family filed a lawsuit against the NFL in 2012, believing that his medical conditions were caused by injuries he received during his playing career. Taylor's sister Odell, a nurse, along with his wife and son, oversaw Taylor's healthcare for over a decade. He died on March 9, 2023, at the age of 80.

== See also ==
- Chiefs–Raiders rivalry
- American Football League players, coaches, and contributors
