= Emmitt Thomas =

American football player and coach (born 1943)

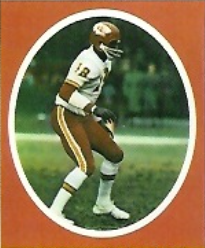
- Thomas in 1972 stamp

No. 18
- Position: Cornerback

Personal information
- Born: June 3, 1943 (age 83); Angleton, Texas, U.S.
- Listed height: 6 ft 2 in (1.88 m)
- Listed weight: 192 lb (87 kg)

Career information
- High school: Marshall (Angleton)
- College: Bishop
- NFL draft: 1966: undrafted

Career history

Playing
- Kansas City Chiefs (1966–1978)

Coaching
- Central Missouri State (1979–1980); St. Louis Cardinals (1981–1985) Assistant coach; Washington Redskins (1986–1992) Wide receivers & defensive backs coach; Washington Redskins (1993–1994) Defensive coordinator; Philadelphia Eagles (1995–1998) Defensive coordinator; Green Bay Packers (1999) Defensive coordinator; Minnesota Vikings (2000–2001) Defensive coordinator; Atlanta Falcons (2002–2009) Assistant head coach & defensive backs coach; Atlanta Falcons (2007) Interim head coach; Kansas City Chiefs (2010–2018) Defensive backs coach

Awards and highlights
- As a player: Super Bowl champion (IV); AFL champion (1966); 2× First-team All-Pro (1974, 1975); 2× Second-team All-Pro (1969, 1971); 5× Pro Bowl (1968, 1971, 1972, 1974, 1975); NFL interceptions leader (1974); AFL interceptions leader (1969); Kansas City Chiefs Hall of Fame; Kansas City Chiefs No. 18 retired; As a coach: 2× Super Bowl champion (XXII, XXVI)

Career NFL statistics
- Interceptions: 58
- Interception yards: 937
- Touchdowns: 5
- Stats at Pro Football Reference

Head coaching record
- Regular season: 1–2 (.333)
- Coaching profile at Pro Football Reference
- Pro Football Hall of Fame

Emmitt Earl Thomas (born June 3, 1943) is an American former professional football player and coach in the National Football League (NFL). He played college football at the now disbanded Bishop College. He played professionally as a cornerback for the Kansas City Chiefs of the NFL. He owns the Chiefs all-time interception record with 58, which places him ninth on pro football's all-time list. Thomas was inducted to the Pro Football Hall of Fame after being nominated by the Seniors Committee.

Thomas became a coach after his playing career. He won Super Bowl IV as a player with the Chiefs and Super Bowl XXII and Super Bowl XXVI as an assistant coach with the Washington Redskins.

== Playing career ==
Thomas made the Chiefs team as an undrafted free agent from Bishop College in Dallas; he was an AFL All-Star in 1968 and made the NFL's AFC-NFC Pro Bowl four times (1971, 1972, 1974, 1975) after the Chiefs joined the NFL in the 1970 AFL-NFL Merger. He was also selected All-Pro three times. In the 1969 season, he led all pro football with 9 interceptions, which he returned for 146 yards and a touchdown, helping his team win the AFL Championship and the fourth and last AFL-NFL World Championship Game, which the Chiefs won 23–7 over the NFL champion Vikings. Thomas recorded an interception in the Kansas City victory. In 1974, he led the NFL in interceptions (12), return yards (214), and return touchdowns (2).

Thomas retired from playing after 13 seasons; he finished his pro football career with 58 interceptions, which he returned for 937 yards and five touchdowns. He also recovered four fumbles, gained 64 yards returning punts, and returned 29 kickoffs for 673 yards. He played in 181 career games, tying for the fifth-most in club annals, and his 58 interceptions are a franchise record.

Thomas was inducted to the Pro Football Hall of Fame in 2008. He was officially inducted at the Enshrinement Ceremony where his bust, sculpted by Scott Myers, was unveiled on August 2, 2008.

== Coaching career ==
Thomas has been an assistant coach in the NFL since 1981. Before being named interim head coach of the Atlanta Falcons on December 12, 2007, after the resignation of Bobby Petrino, Thomas was the Falcons' Senior Defensive Assistant/Secondary Coach. After Petrino's sudden departure left the team in shambles, Thomas attempted to unite the Atlanta locker room, and was able to lead the Falcons to a season-ending victory over the Seattle Seahawks. On January 24, 2008, new Falcons head coach Mike Smith announced that Thomas would remain on staff as assistant head coach. Thomas was voted into the Pro Football Hall of Fame along with Darrell Green and Art Monk, two players he coached during Super Bowl runs with the Washington Redskins. On January 13, 2010, his contract expired and was not renewed by the Falcons.

On February 1, 2010, he was hired as the secondary coach of the Kansas City Chiefs. On February 12, 2019, Thomas announced his retirement from coaching.

=== Head coaching record ===
Team	Year	Regular season					Postseason			
Team	Year	Won	Lost	Ties	Win %	Finish	Won	Lost	Win %	Result
ATL*	2007	1	2	0	.333	4th in NFC South	–	–	–	–
Total		1	2	0	.333					

*Interim head coach.

== Personal life ==
Thomas resides in Kansas City, Missouri. He married Jacqueline Heafley in 1983, and they remained married until her death on August 21, 2017. He has one son, Derek, and one daughter, Dedra, from a previous marriage with ex-wife Dianne Thomas. Derek now resides in Las Vegas, Nevada, doing numerous coaching jobs. Dedra Thomas is currently a legal nurse consultant in Kansas City, Mo. Thomas has a total of eight grandkids: Keydron, Keynan, Kierrah, Kyandria, Bailey, Samantha, Jade and Shane.

== See also ==
- List of American Football League players
