= Super Bowl IV =

Fourth AFL–NFL Championship Game

Minnesota Vikings (NFL) (12–2)	Kansas City Chiefs (AFL) (11–3)
7	23
Head coach: Bud Grant	Head coach: Hank Stram
	1	2	3	4	Total
MIN	0	0	7	0	7
KC	3	13	7	0	23
- Date: January 11, 1970
- Kickoff time: 2:40 p.m. CST (UTC-6)
- Stadium: Tulane Stadium; New Orleans, Louisiana
- MVP: Len Dawson, quarterback
- Favorite: Vikings by 13.5
- Referee: John McDonough
- Attendance: 80,562

Ceremonies
- National anthem: Doc Severinsen with Pat O'Brien
- Coin toss: John McDonough
- Halftime show: Southern University Band, re-enactment of the Battle of New Orleans

TV in the United States
- Network: CBS
- Announcers: Jack Buck and Pat Summerall
- Nielsen ratings: 39.4 (est. 44.3 million viewers)
- Market share: 69
- Cost of 30-second commercial: $78,000

Radio in the United States
- Network: CBS Radio
- Announcers: Bob Reynolds and Tom Hedrick

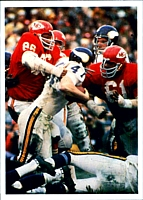
Buck Buchanan (#86) and Curley Culp (#61) of the Chiefs defense stopping a Vikings' rushing play in Super Bowl IV

Super Bowl IV was an American football game played on January 11, 1970, at Tulane Stadium in New Orleans, Louisiana. It was the fourth and final AFL–NFL World Championship Game in professional football prior to the AFL–NFL merger taking effect the following season. The American Football League (AFL) champion Kansas City Chiefs defeated the National Football League (NFL) champion Minnesota Vikings by the score of 23–7. This victory by the AFL squared the Super Bowl series with the NFL at two games apiece as the two leagues merged after the game. This was the first major professional sports championship won by a Kansas City-based team.

Despite the AFL's New York Jets winning the previous season's Super Bowl, many sports writers and fans thought it was a fluke and continued to believe that the NFL was still superior to the AFL, and thus fully expected the Vikings to defeat the Chiefs; the Vikings entered the Super Bowl as 13½ point favorites. The Vikings posted a 12–2 record in 1969, then defeated the Los Angeles Rams 23–20 for the Western Conference title, and the Cleveland Browns 27–7 in the NFL Championship Game. The Chiefs, who previously appeared in the first Super Bowl, finished the regular season at 11–3; they continued with two road wins in the AFL playoffs, dethroning the New York Jets 13–6, and then taking down division rival Oakland Raiders 17–7 in the final AFL title game.

Under wet conditions, the Chiefs defense dominated Super Bowl IV by limiting the Vikings' offense to only 67 rushing yards, forcing three interceptions, and recovering two fumbles. The Chiefs' Len Dawson became the fourth consecutive winning quarterback to be named Super Bowl MVP. He completed 12 of 17 passes for 142 yards and one touchdown, with one interception. Dawson also recorded three rushing attempts for 11 yards.

Super Bowl IV is also notable for NFL Films miking up the Chiefs' Hank Stram during the game, the first time that a head coach had worn a microphone during a Super Bowl.

The Chiefs would not win or appear in another Super Bowl until Super Bowl LIV in 2020.

== Background ==
=== Host selection process ===
The NFL awarded Super Bowl IV to New Orleans on March 19, 1969, at the owners' meetings held in Palm Springs, California. It marked the first of eleven (as of 2024) Super Bowls to be held in New Orleans. Two cites were in consideration for the game, Miami being the other. After two consecutive Super Bowls played at the Miami Orange Bowl (II and III), owners by a roughly three-quarters vote, opted out of giving Miami the game for a third straight year. Some owners felt that since an AFL town had hosted the game two years in a row, that an NFL town should get another turn to balance out the hosting duties. New Orleans mayor Victor H. Schiro was joined by George W. Healy Jr. (editor of the Times-Picayune) and Al Hirt. They highlighted the superior seating capacity (80,982) of Tulane Stadium, as well as the local accommodations. Healy and Miami mayor Stephen P. Clark became locked in a debate during a press conference while the deliberation and voting was going on behind closed doors.

=== Minnesota Vikings ===
The Minnesota Vikings, led by head coach Bud Grant, entered the game with an NFL best 12–2 regular season record, leading the older league in total points scored (379) and fewest points allowed (133). They had scored 50 or greater points in three different games. They lost their first and last games of the season, but in between had 12 straight victories, the longest single-season winning streak in 35 years. The Vikings broke the previous record of 11 consecutive wins set by the 1964 Colts. Their defense, considered the most intimidating in the NFL, was anchored by a defensive line nicknamed the "Purple People Eaters", consisting of defensive tackles Gary Larsen and Alan Page, and defensive ends Carl Eller and Jim Marshall. The secondary was led by Bobby Bryant (8 interceptions, 97 return yards), Earsell Mackbee (6 interceptions, 100 return yards), and Paul Krause (5 interceptions, 82 return yards, 1 touchdown). However, Bryant missed the Super Bowl due to injury.

On offense, quarterback Joe Kapp was known for his superb leadership and his running ability, both throwing on the run and running for extra yards. And when Kapp did take off and run, instead of sliding when he was about to be tackled like most quarterbacks, he lowered his shoulder and went right at the tackler. This style of play earned him the nickname "Indestructible". In the NFL Championship Game against the Cleveland Browns, he collided with linebacker Jim Houston while running for a first down, and Houston had to be helped off the field after the play ended. Also, Kapp was known for being an extremely unselfish leader: when he was voted the Vikings Most Valuable Player, he turned the award down and said that every player on the team was equally valuable: "There is no one most valuable Viking. There are 40 most valuable Vikings."

Running back Dave Osborn was the team's top rusher with 643 yards and seven touchdowns. He also caught 22 passes for 236 yards and another touchdown. In the passing game, Pro Bowl wide receiver Gene Washington averaged 21.1 yards per catch by recording 821 yards and nine touchdowns from 39 receptions. Wide receiver John Henderson caught 34 passes for 553 yards and 5 touchdowns. The Vikings' offensive line was anchored by Pro Bowlers Grady Alderman and Mick Tingelhoff.

By winning the 1969 NFL Championship, the Vikings became the last possessors of the Ed Thorp Memorial Trophy. The trophy was thought to have been lost by the Vikings following the merger, but it was found at the Green Bay Packers Hall of Fame in 2015.

=== Kansas City Chiefs ===
Ten-year AFL patch worn by the Chiefs in Super Bowl IV

Meanwhile, it seemed that the Chiefs, led by head coach Hank Stram, and especially quarterback Len Dawson, were jinxed throughout the year. In the second game of the regular season, Dawson suffered a knee injury that kept him from playing the next six games. Then in the following week, second-string quarterback Jacky Lee went down for the season with a broken ankle in a loss to the Cincinnati Bengals. However, third-string quarterback Mike Livingston engineered five wins of the next six starts, with Dawson coming off the bench in the second half of the sixth to clinch the win. The Chiefs (11–3) managed to finish in second place behind the Oakland Raiders (12–1–1) in the AFL's Western Division, after suffering a tough 10–6 loss to Oakland in the final game of the regular season. After that game, many sports writers and fans heavily criticized the team and Dawson for the poor play calling (Dawson called between 80 and 90 percent of the plays during the season).

After a 34–16 road win over the New York Jets on November 16, the Chiefs clinched a playoff spot at 9–1 with four games remaining. Wanting to set itself up more like the NFL right before the merger, the AFL expanded its 1969 playoffs to four teams, with the second place teams from each division traveling to play the first place teams from the other division (Western champion vs. Eastern runner-up, and vice versa). As a result of the new playoff format, many critics thought the Chiefs entered the playoffs through a "back-door" as the runner-up in the Western division. However, Dawson silenced the critics and led Kansas City to a strong finish with two road wins in the playoffs, defeating the defending champion Jets 13–6, and the Raiders (who had beaten them 41–6 in the previous year's postseason and won seven of the last eight meetings, including twice in the 1969 season) 17–7 in the AFL Championship Game. This essentially made the Chiefs the first wild card team to play in the Super Bowl. (Dawson said he thought both the Jets and the Raiders could have beaten the Vikings.)

Still, many people felt that Dawson's level of play in the AFL was not comparable to the NFL. Dawson himself had spent five seasons in the NFL as a backup before going to the AFL and becoming one of its top quarterbacks. "The AFL saved my career," said Dawson. In his 8 AFL seasons, he had thrown more touchdown passes (182) than any other professional football quarterback during that time. But because many still viewed the AFL as being inferior to the NFL, his records were not considered significant. Dawson's first chance to prove himself against an NFL team ended in failure, with his Chiefs losing 35–10 to the Green Bay Packers in Super Bowl I, reinforcing the notion that his success was only due to playing in the "inferior league".

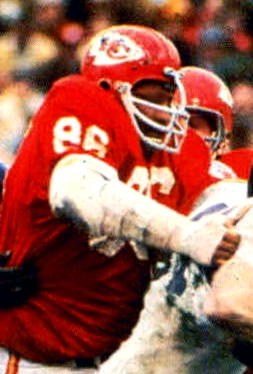
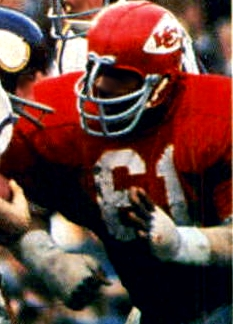
Defensive tackles Buck Buchanan (left) and Curley Culp were integral parts of a dominant defensive line

Offensively, the Chiefs employed innovative formations and strategies designed by Stram to disrupt the timing and positioning of the defense. Besides Dawson, the Chiefs main offensive weapon was running back Mike Garrett (1965 Heisman Trophy winner), who rushed for 732 yards and 6 touchdowns. He also recorded 43 receptions for 432 yards and another 2 touchdowns. Running back Robert Holmes had 612 rushing yards, 266 receiving yards, and 5 touchdowns. Running back Warren McVea rushed for 500 yards and 7 touchdowns, while adding another 318 yards returning kickoffs. In the passing game, wide receiver Otis Taylor caught 41 passes for 696 yards and 7 touchdowns. The offensive line was anchored by AFL All-Stars Ed Budde and Jim Tyrer. According to Len Dawson, placekicker Jan Stenerud and punter Jerrel Wilson were the best kickers in football. The offensive line was led by tackle Jim Tyrer, who was selected to his 6th AFL pro bowl.

The Chiefs defense led the AFL in fewest points allowed (177), as all 11 players started all 14 games. Like the Vikings, the Chiefs also had an outstanding defensive line, which was led by defensive tackles Buck Buchanan and Curley Culp, and defensive ends Jerry Mays and Aaron Brown. The Chiefs also had AFL All-Star linebacker Willie Lanier, who recorded 4 interceptions and 1 fumble recovery during the season. The Kansas City secondary was led by defensive backs Emmitt Thomas (9 interceptions for 146 return yards and a touchdown), Jim Kearney (5 interceptions for 154 return yards and a touchdown) and Johnny Robinson (8 interceptions for 158 return yards). Six members of the Chiefs' defense have been inducted into the Hall of Fame: Culp, Buchanan, Lanier, Thomas, Bobby Bell, and Johnny Robinson.

Kansas City's defense had shown their talent in the AFL title game when they defeated the Raiders. Raiders quarterback Daryle Lamonica had completed 13 of 17 passes for 276 yards and a record setting 6 touchdowns in a 56–7 divisional rout of the Houston Oilers in their previous game, and had shredded the Chiefs with 347 yards and 5 touchdowns in their 41–6 win in the previous season's playoffs. But in the 1969 AFL Championship Game, the Chiefs defense held him to just 15 of 39 completions and intercepted him 3 times in the fourth quarter.

=== Playoffs ===
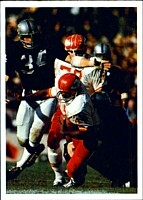
The visiting Chiefs topped the Raiders in the AFL championship game

Kansas City advanced to the Super Bowl with wins over the two previous AFL champions. First they defeated the New York Jets in a defensive struggle 13–6, with Dawson's 61-yard completion to Taylor setting up the game winning score on his 19-yard touchdown pass to Gloster Richardson. Kansas City held New York to just 234 yards and forced 4 turnovers. The Chiefs then faced the Raiders, who took a 7–0 lead over them in the first quarter, but that was their only score of the game. Meanwhile, Dawson's 41-yard completion to Frank Pitts in the second quarter set up a 1-yard touchdown run by Wendell Hayes. Then in the third quarter, Emmitt Thomas' clutch interception in the end zone and Dawson's long completion to Taylor sparked a 95-yard drive that ended with a touchdown run by Robert Holmes. Kansas City went into the fourth quarter with a 14–7 lead, and held on for the win by forcing four turnovers (3 interceptions and a turnover on downs) in the final period.

Meanwhile, the ninth-year Vikings recorded their first postseason win in franchise history by defeating the Los Angeles Rams 23–20. Though the Rams held the lead for most of the time in regulation, Kapp led a touchdown drive to give the team a 21–20 fourth quarter lead. Eller made a key play to preserve the lead, sacking Rams quarterback (and 1969 NFL MVP) Roman Gabriel in the end zone for a safety and Alan Page intercepted a pass with thirty seconds remaining.

Then Minnesota quickly demolished the Cleveland Browns in the NFL championship game, jumping to a 24–0 halftime lead and going on to win 27–7. The Vikings offense gained 381 yards without turning the ball over, with Kapp passing for 169 yards and a touchdown, while Osborn rushed for 108 yards and Washington gained 125 yards on just 3 receptions.

=== Super Bowl pregame news and notes ===
Many sportswriters and fans expected that the Vikings would easily defeat the Chiefs. Although the AFL's New York Jets won Super Bowl III at the end of the previous season, many were convinced that it was a fluke. They continued to believe that all of the NFL teams were far and away superior to all of the AFL teams. And regardless of the differences among the leagues, the Vikings simply appeared to be a superior team. Minnesota had the NFL's best record and outscored their opponents by 246 points, while Kansas City had not even won their own division. The Chiefs also had played only five games in the regular season against teams who finished with winning records, and eight against teams who finished with losing records, while the Vikings played seven against teams with winning records and seven against teams with losing records. Including playoffs, Minnesota had not lost a game against a winning team.

Super Bowl IV provided another chance to show that Dawson belonged at the same level with all of the great NFL quarterbacks. But five days before the Super Bowl, news leaked that his name had been linked to a Detroit federal gambling investigation. Although Dawson was eventually cleared of any charges, the controversy added to the pressure he was already under while preparing for the game, causing him to lose sleep and concentration. "It was, beyond a doubt, the toughest week of my life," said Dawson.

Bud Grant became the first Super Bowl coach not to wear a tie. His counterpart, Hank Stram, wore a three-piece suit, with a red vest and a blazer with the Chiefs' helmet logo emblazoned on the breast pocket.

All seats for the game were priced at $15; the previous year's prices were $12, $8 and $6. The attendance mark of 80,562 is the highest of the first four pre-merger Super Bowl games played.

== Broadcasting ==
=== American television ===
Super Bowl IV was broadcast in the United States by CBS with play-by-play announcer Jack Buck (his only Super Bowl on television) and color commentator Pat Summerall, with Frank Gifford and Jack Whitaker reporting from the winning and losing locker rooms, respectively. After the season, Summerall was transferred to work alongside Ray Scott, whose broadcast partner Paul Christman died on March 2, 1970. This was the last Super Bowl that Gifford worked for CBS, as he left following the 1970 season to become the play-by-play announcer for Monday Night Football. Gifford did not work another Super Bowl until Super Bowl XIX, the first Super Bowl to air on ABC.

While the game was a sellout, the NFL's unconditional blackout rules prohibited the live telecast from being shown in the New Orleans area (the NFL allowed a tape-delayed broadcast to be aired at midnight by local affiliate WWL-TV). (Note: WWL-TV aired movies Iron Mistress and Strange Lady in Town between two episodes of The Honeymooners as filler programming.)

CBS erased the videotape a few days after the game, as the network had done following the broadcasts of Super Bowl I and II. Videotape was expensive and television networks did not believe that old games were worth saving. For many years, the only known extant recording of the broadcast was one sourced from the CBC archives. The network and its French-language counterpart Télévision de Radio-Canada carried the broadcast, and it was saved because of Vikings coach Bud Grant's history in the CFL and the close proximity of Minnesota to Canada. CBC transferred the footage to black-and-white film using the kinescope process soon after the original broadcast, enabling reuse of the videotape. However, a color videotape of the first three quarters and a portion of the fourth quarter, including the pregame show and original commercials, was discovered in 2023 and is publicly available.

44.27 million people in the U.S. watched the game on television, resulting in a rating of 39.4 and a market share of 69.

=== Hank Stram and NFL Films ===
The night before the game, Ed Sabol of NFL Films met with Hank Stram and convinced him to wear a hidden microphone during the game so that Stram's comments could be recorded for the NFL Films Super Bowl IV film. This was the first time that a head coach had worn a microphone during a Super Bowl, although Stram had done so during the regular season in a home game against the Boston Patriots. Sabol and Stram agreed that the microphone would be kept secret. Sabol had his top sound man Jack Newman, who had also wired Vince Lombardi in a previous playoff game, conceal the microphone on Stram and monitor the sound throughout. However, some Chiefs players noticed that Stram's demeanor deviated from his normal form during the game, ostensibly because he was aware of the microphone. Linebacker Willie Lanier commented that "Hank seemed somewhat more animated", quarterback Len Dawson "wondered why he was being so joyous and chattering all the time" and halfback Mike Garrett recalled that Stram "was in rare form and pretty glib".

Stram's awareness of the microphone likely resulted in a direct impact on the game itself. Dawson later recalled that "I thought there was something wrong with Hank" because Stram selected the Chiefs' offensive play calls during the game and communicated them directly to Dawson, while Dawson had routinely called his own plays during the season.

Because of Stram's colorful soundbites throughout the film, it ranks among the most popular and well-known of all official Super Bowl highlight films, despite the fact that the game was a mostly one-sided affair. Notable excerpts include the following:

- To Len Dawson: "C'mon Lenny! Pump it in there, baby! Just keep matriculating the ball down the field, boys!"
- Observing the confusion in the Vikings' defense: "Kassulke (Vikings strong safety Karl Kassulke) was running around there like it was a Chinese fire drill. They didn't know where Mike (Garrett) was. Didn't know where he was! They look like they're flat as hell."
- Before the Chiefs' first touchdown, Stram called the play known as 65 Toss Power Trap. When the Chiefs scored on the play, Stram laughed while yelling to his players on the bench, "Was it there, boys? Was that there, rats? Nice going, baby! Haaa-haaa-haaa-ha-ha-ha! Haaa! The mentor! 65 Toss Power Trap! Yaaa-haaa-haaa-ha-ha! Yaaa-ha-ha! I tell ya that baby was there, yes sir boys! Haa-ha-ha-ha-ha! Wooo!!"
- As the referees were spotting the ball to determine whether the Vikings had gained a first down, Stram yelled to the officials, "Make sure you mark it right! Oh, you lost your place! Measure it, take the chains out there! Oh, they didn't make it! My God, they made that by an inch! He definitely gave them an extra foot. Bad! Very bad!"
- When the officials overruled what looked like a Minnesota fumble, Stram said: "Mr. Official, let me ask you something. How can six of you miss a play like that? Huh? All six of you! When the ball jumped out of there as soon as we made contact?... No. What??"
- After a reverse play in the third quarter that resulted in a first down, Stram said to the officials, "Ya did good, you marked it good. You did a helluva job, nice going!"
- On Otis Taylor's touchdown reception that clinched the game, Stram was heard yelling and laughing.
- In the fourth quarter, Stram congratulated Johnny Robinson and Willie Lanier following interceptions, as well as special teamer and reserve linebacker Bob Stein.
- When reserve quarterback Mike Livingston entered the game to relieve Dawson with the game in hand, Stram told Dawson, "Nice going, Leonard. Nice going, baby. Nice going, baby."
- As the clock counted down the final seconds, Stram exclaimed, "How sweet it is!".

== Game summary ==
Chiefs head coach Hank Stram, who was also the team's offensive coordinator, devised an effective game plan against the Vikings. He knew Minnesota's secondary was able to play very far off receivers because Viking defensive ends Carl Eller and Jim Marshall knocked down short passes or put pressure on the quarterback. Stram decided to double-team Marshall and Eller; most of quarterback Len Dawson's completions were short passes, and neither Marshall nor Eller knocked down any passes. Stram also concluded that the Vikings' aggressiveness on defense also made them susceptible to trap plays; Mike Garrett's rushing touchdown came on a trap play. Minnesota safety Karl Kassulke said later, "I think the main thing, due to their different sets, was our moment of hesitation. We were not a hell-bent team like we normally were." On offense, the Vikings' inside running game depended on center Mick Tingelhoff blocking linebackers. Stram put 285-pound Buck Buchanan or 295-pound Curley Culp nose to nose in front of Tingelhoff, who weighed only 235 pounds. To Minnesota's credit, the NFL used the so-called light "greyhound" centers while the AFL used big centers. It was a mismatch that disrupted the Vikings' running game; it also kept quarterback Joe Kapp from moving outside the pocket. Left defensive end Jerry Mays said of the odd line formation, "...we never played it that much before. Minnesota's recognition was destroyed." Wrote Dawson, "It was obvious that their offense had never seen a defense like ours." Minnesota rushed for only two first downs.

=== First quarter ===
The Vikings began the game by receiving the opening kickoff and marching from their own 20-yard line to the Kansas City 39-yard line with quarterback Joe Kapp completing his first two passes for 36 yards. Kapp's next pass was also a completion, but running back Bill Brown was slowed by linebacker Bobby Bell, then brought down by defensive end Jerry Mays for a 1-yard loss to make it third down, on which Kapp failed to connect with tight end John Beasley. Minnesota rushed for only 6 yards on the drive and chose to punt. The Chiefs then drove 42 yards in eight plays. Included was a 20-yard reception by wide receiver Frank Pitts after Vikings cornerback Ed Sharockman gambled trying to make an interception. Kansas City then scored on placekicker Jan Stenerud's Super Bowl record 48-yard field goal. This record stood for 24 years until broken by Steve Christie in Super Bowl XXVIII. (According to Dawson, the Vikings were shocked that the Chiefs attempted a 48-yard field goal. Stenerud was among the first soccer-style placekickers in professional football. The others included brothers Charlie and Pete Gogolak. The soccer-style placekickers used the instep of the foot while the conventional professional football placekickers kicked straight on with their toes. "Stenerud was a major factor," Dawson said.) Minnesota then managed to reach midfield on their next drive, which was even aided by a roughing the kicker penalty on Chiefs linebacker Bob Stein during a punt from their own 25-yard line, but could not get in scoring position and were forced to punt again.

On the first play of the Chiefs' ensuing drive, Dawson threw a 20-yard completion to Pitts, followed by a 9-yard pass to wide receiver Otis Taylor, to get to midfield before the end of the quarter.

=== Second quarter ===
Four plays later, on the first play of the second quarter, a pass interference penalty on Sharockman nullified Dawson's third down incompletion and gave Kansas City a new set of downs at the Minnesota 31-yard line. However, on 3rd-and-4 at the 25-yard line, Vikings cornerback Earsell Mackbee broke up a deep pass intended for Taylor, forcing the Chiefs to settle for a 32-yard field goal by Stenerud, increasing their lead to 6–0.

On the second play of Minnesota's next drive, Chiefs cornerback Jim Marsalis forced a fumble on wide receiver John Henderson, who caught a 16-yard reception, and safety Johnny Robinson recovered the ball at the Vikings' 46-yard line. But defensive tackle Alan Page tackled running back Mike Garrett for a 1-yard loss, and then safety Paul Krause intercepted Dawson's pass to Taylor at the 7-yard line on the next play, turning the ball back over to the Vikings.

However, the Vikings also could not take advantage of the turnover. Kapp's two incompletions and a delay of game penalty forced Minnesota to punt from their own 5-yard line. The Chiefs then took over at the Viking 44-yard line after punter/backup quarterback Bob Lee's kick traveled 39 yards. A 19-yard run by Pitts on an end around play fooled the overaggressive, over-pursuing Viking defense to set up Stenerud's 25-yard field goal, increasing Kansas City's lead to 9–0.

On the ensuing kickoff, Vikings safety/kick returner Charlie West fumbled the ball, and Chiefs center Remi Prudhomme recovered it at the Minnesota 19-yard line. ("That was a key, key play," said Dawson.) Defensive end Jim Marshall sacked Dawson for an 8-yard loss on the first play of the drive; however, a 13-yard run on a draw play by running back Wendell Hayes and a 10-yard reception by Taylor gave the Chiefs a first down at the Vikings' 4-yard line. Three plays later, Garrett's 5-yard touchdown run on a trap draw play named 65 Toss Power Trap (although the play did not involve a toss), aided by pulling guard Mo Moorman's block on Page that cleared a huge hole, gave Kansas City a 16–0 lead.

West returned the ensuing kickoff 27 yards to the 32-yard line. On the first play of the drive, Kapp completed a 27-yard pass to Henderson to advance the ball to the Kansas City 41-yard line. However, on the next three plays, Kapp threw two incompletions and was sacked by Chief defensive tackle Buck Buchanan for an 8-yard loss. On fourth down, Vikings kicker Fred Cox's 56-yard field goal attempt fell way short of the goal posts and was caught and returned to the Chiefs' 24-yard line by kick returner Warren McVea. Kansas City could not get the ball past midfield, so they punted it back to Minnesota to end the half. For the first half, Minnesota rushed for only 24 yards and failed to convert any of five third downs. On nine first down plays, the Vikings rushed six times and gained only 12 yards.

To this point in the combined history of NFL and AFL championship games, including the first three Super Bowls, no team had lost a game when holding a lead of more than 10 points, no matter what time of the game it was. The Chiefs, when they were the Dallas Texans in their last game before they became the Chiefs, lost a 17–0 lead in the 1962 AFL Championship Game, but managed to defeat the Houston Oilers 20–17 in the second overtime. No team would lose such a lead and also lose the game until Super Bowl LI.

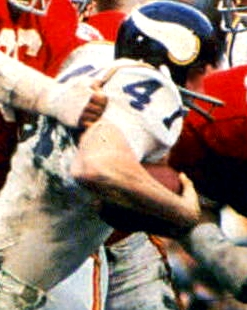
Fullback Dave Osborn scored Minnesota's only touchdown in Super Bowl IV

=== Third quarter ===
In the third quarter, the Vikings managed to build momentum. After the Chiefs punted on their opening possession, Minnesota drove 69 yards in 10 plays, during which they made their first third down conversion of the game. Kapp completed four consecutive passes for 47 yards, including a 15-yard pass to tight end John Beasley. Kapp also rushed for 7 yards. The Vikings' drive ended with fullback Dave Osborn's 4-yard touchdown run, reducing their deficit to 16–7. However, the Chiefs responded on their next possession with a six-play, 82-yard drive. Pitts picked up a key first down with a 7-yard left-to-right run on a reverse play. Then right after a 15-yard personal foul penalty against the Vikings, Dawson threw a short pass to Taylor, who caught the ball at the Minnesota 41-yard line, broke tackles by Mackbee and safety Karl Kassulke, took off down the sideline and scored the clinching touchdown on a 46-yard play, making the score 23–7. The Vikings reached their own 47 on their next possession to end the quarter.

=== Fourth quarter ===
The Vikings were demoralized after the game-breaking touchdown and the Chiefs' defense continued to shut them down in the fourth quarter, forcing three interceptions on three Minnesota possessions to clinch the 23–7 victory. The defeat was total for the Vikings, as even Kapp had to be helped off the field in the fourth quarter after getting strip-sacked by Chiefs defensive end Aaron Brown. Gary Cuozzo filled in for Kapp for the rest of the game. Fittingly, the Vikings' final play was an interception Cuozzo threw to cornerback Emmitt Thomas.

Kansas City running back and future University of Southern California Athletic Director Mike Garrett, the 1965 Heisman Trophy recipient, was the top rusher of the game, recording 11 carries for 39 yards and a touchdown. He also caught two passes for 25 yards and returned a kickoff for 18 yards. Taylor was the Chiefs' leading receiver with six catches for 81 yards and a touchdown. Kapp finished the game with 16 of 25 completions for 183 yards, with two costly interceptions. Henderson was the top receiver of the game with seven catches for 111 yards. The Chiefs defense completely shut down Minnesota's vaunted rushing attack. In the NFL championship game, Osborn had rushed for 108 yards while Kapp rushed for 57. In Super Bowl IV, however, the two rushed for a combined total of 24 yards. In addition, Kansas City's secondary held Minnesota All Pro receiver Gene Washington to one reception for 9 yards.

Referring to the Vikings' three interceptions, three fumbles, and six penalties, Kassulke said, "We made more mental mistakes in one game than we did in one season." Kapp never played again for the Vikings, as he played out the option of his contract and signed with the Boston Patriots for the 1970 season. The Super Bowl parade in Kansas City the day after the game saw a crowd of over 150,000 greet the team (with the exception of a few players who focused their attention on the impending AFL All-Star Game) downtown; fifty years later, a handful of players from the Super Bowl IV team attended the parade for the Super Bowl LIV champion Chiefs.

Kansas City is, as of 2024, the only team in the Super Bowl era to win the title without allowing as much as 10 points in any postseason game.

=== Box score ===
Super Bowl IV: Kansas City Chiefs 23, Minnesota Vikings 7

Quarter	1	2	3	4	Total
Vikings (NFL)	0	0	7	0	7
Chiefs (AFL)	3	13	7	0	23

at Tulane Stadium, New Orleans, Louisiana

- Date: January 11, 1970
- Game time: 2:40 p.m. CST
- Game weather: 61 °F (16 °C), heavy overcast, wet field, tornado watch issued for area prior to kickoff

Scoring summary

Quarter	Time	Drive			Team	Scoring information	Score	
Quarter	Time	Plays	Yards	TOP	Team	Scoring information	MIN	KC
1	6:52	8	42	4:06	KC	48-yard field goal by Jan Stenerud	0	3
2	13:20	8	55	4:48	KC	32-yard field goal by Stenerud	0	6
2	7:52	4	27	2:13	KC	25-yard field goal by Stenerud	0	9
2	5:34	6	19	1:47	KC	Mike Garrett 5-yard touchdown run, Stenerud kick good	0	16
3	4:32	10	69	4:34	MIN	Dave Osborn 4-yard touchdown run, Fred Cox kick good	7	16
3	1:22	6	82	3:10	KC	Otis Taylor 46-yard touchdown reception from Len Dawson, Stenerud kick good	7	23
"TOP" = time of possession. For other American football terms, see Glossary of American football.							7	23

== Final statistics ==
Sources:The NFL's Official Encyclopedic History of Professional Football, (1973), p. 144, Macmillan Publishing Co. New York, NY, LCCN 73-3862, NFL.com Super Bowl IV, USA Today Super Bowl IV Play by Play, Pro Football Reference Super Bowl IV, Super Bowl IV Play Finder KC, Super Bowl IV Play Finder Min

=== Statistical comparison ===
	Minnesota Vikings	Kansas City Chiefs
First downs	13	18
First downs rushing	2	8
First downs passing	10	7
First downs penalty	1	3
Third down efficiency	3/9	7/15
Fourth down efficiency	0/0	0/0
Net yards rushing	67	151
Rushing attempts	19	42
Yards per rush	3.5	3.6
Passing – Completions/attempts	17/28	12/17
Times sacked-total yards	3–27	3–20
Interceptions thrown	3	1
Net yards passing	172	122
Total net yards	239	273
Punt returns-total yards	2–1	1–0
Kickoff returns-total yards	4–79	2–36
Interceptions-total return yards	1–0	3–24
Punts-average yardage	3–37.0	4–48.5
Fumbles-lost	3–2	0–0
Penalties-total yards	6–67	4–47
Time of possession	25:27	34:33
Turnovers	5	1

=== Individual leaders ===
Vikings passing
	C/ATT^{1}	Yds	TD	INT	Rating
Joe Kapp	16/25	183	0	2	52.6
Gary Cuozzo	1/3	16	0	1	12.5
Vikings rushing
	Car^{2}	Yds	TD	LG^{3}	Yds/Car
Bill Brown	6	26	0	10	4.33
Oscar Reed	4	17	0	15	4.25
Dave Osborn	7	15	1	4	2.14
Joe Kapp	2	9	0	7	4.50
Vikings receiving
	Rec^{4}	Yds	TD	LG^{3}	Target^{5}
John Henderson	7	111	0	28	10
Bill Brown	3	11	0	11	3
John Beasley	2	41	0	26	5
Oscar Reed	2	16	0	12	3
Dave Osborn	2	11	0	10	2
Gene Washington	1	9	0	9	4
Bob Grim	0	0	0	0	1

Chiefs passing
	C/ATT^{1}	Yds	TD	INT	Rating
Len Dawson	12/17	142	1	1	90.8
Chiefs rushing
	Car^{2}	Yds	TD	LG^{3}	Yds/Car
Mike Garrett	11	39	1	6	3.55
Frank Pitts	3	37	0	19	12.33
Wendell Hayes	8	31	0	13	3.88
Warren McVea	12	26	0	9	2.17
Len Dawson	3	11	0	11	3.67
Robert Holmes	5	7	0	7	1.40
Chiefs receiving
	Rec^{4}	Yds	TD	LG^{3}	Target^{5}
Otis Taylor	6	81	1	46	8
Frank Pitts	3	33	0	20	3
Mike Garrett	2	25	0	17	3
Wendell Hayes	1	3	0	3	1
Warren McVea	0	0	0	0	1
Gloster Richardson	0	0	0	0	1

^{1}Completions/attempts ^{2}Carries ^{3}Long gain ^{4}Receptions ^{5}Times targeted

=== Records set ===
The following records were set or tied in Super Bowl IV, according to the official NFL.com boxscore and the ProFootball reference.com game summary. Some records have to meet NFL minimum number of attempts to be recognized. The minimums are shown (in parentheses).

Player records established in IV
Highest passing completion percentage, career, (40 attempts)	63.6% (28–44)	Len Dawson (Kansas City)
Most receptions, career	10	Otis Taylor
Longest kickoff return	33 yards	Clint Jones (Minnesota)
Most punts, career	11	Jerrel Wilson (Kansas City)
Highest punting average, game (4 punts)	48.5 yards (4–194)	Jerrel Wilson (Kansas City)
Highest punting average, career (10 punts)	46.5 yards (11–511)	Jerrel Wilson (Kansas City)
Longest field goal	48 yards	Jan Stenerud (Kansas City)

Team records set
Super Bowl win with no home playoff games	3 games	Chiefs
Points
Largest halftime margin	16 points	Chiefs
Rushing
Fewest rushing yards (net)	67	Vikings
Passing
Fewest passing attempts	17	Chiefs
Fewest passes completed	12	Chiefs
Fewest yards passing (net)	122 yards	Chiefs
First downs
Fewest first downs	13	Vikings
Fewest first downs rushing	2	Vikings
Most first downs, penalty	3	Chiefs
Punting
Highest average, game (4 punts)	48.5 yards	Chiefs
Penalties
Most penalties, game	6	Vikings
Most yards penalized, game	67 yards	Vikings
Team records tied
Most Super Bowl appearances	2	Chiefs
Most points scored, first half	16 points	Chiefs
Most points, second quarter	13 points	Chiefs
Longest touchdown scoring drive	82 yards	Chiefs
Fewest first downs passing	7	Chiefs
Fewest (net) yards allowed	239 yards	Chiefs
Fewest punt returns, game	1	Chiefs
Fewest punt return yards gained	0 yards	Chiefs
Fewest points, game	7 points	Vikings
Fewest points, first half	0 points	Vikings
Fewest touchdowns, game	1	Vikings
Fewest net yards gained, rushing and passing	239 yards	Vikings
Fewest rushing attempts	19	Vikings
Most passes completed	17	Vikings
Fewest passing touchdowns	0	Vikings
Most fumbles, game	3	Vikings
Most fumbles lost, game	2	Vikings
Most turnovers, game	5	Vikings
Fewest punts, game	3	Vikings

Records, both team totals
	Total	Chiefs	Vikings
Fewest points scored, second half	14	7	7
Net yards, both teams
Fewest net yards, rushing and passing	512	273	239
Passing, both teams
Fewest passing attempts	45	17	28
First downs, both teams
Fewest first downs	32	19	13
Fewest first downs rushing	11	9	2
Most first downs, penalty	4	3	1
Kickoff returns, both teams
Fewest yards gained	115	36	79
Punt returns, both teams
Fewest punt returns, game	3	1	2
Fewest yards gained, game	18	0	18
Penalties, both teams
Most penalties, game	10	4	6
Most yards penalized	114	47	67
Records tied, both teams
Most points, third quarter	14	7	7
Most times intercepted	4	1	3
Fewest first downs, passing	17	7	10
Most interceptions by	4	3	1
Most fumbles	3	0	3
Most fumbles lost	2	0	2
Most turnovers	6	1	5
Fewest punts, game	7	4	3

== Starting lineups ==
Hall of Fame‡

Minnesota	Position	Kansas City
Offense
Gene Washington	WR	Frank Pitts
Grady Alderman	LT	Jim Tyrer
Jim Vellone	LG	Ed Budde
Mick Tingelhoff‡	C	E. J. Holub
Milt Sunde	RG	Mo Moorman
Ron Yary‡	RT	Dave Hill
John Beasley	TE	Fred Arbanas
John Henderson	WR	Otis Taylor
Joe Kapp	QB	Len Dawson‡
Dave Osborn	RB	Mike Garrett
Bill Brown	RB	Robert Holmes
Defense
Carl Eller‡	LE	Jerry Mays
Gary Larsen	LT	Curley Culp‡
Alan Page‡	RT	Buck Buchanan‡
Jim Marshall	RE	Aaron Brown
Roy Winston	LLB	Bobby Bell‡
Lonnie Warwick	MLB	Willie Lanier‡
Wally Hilgenberg	RLB	Jim Lynch
Earsell Mackbee	LCB	Jim Marsalis
Ed Sharockman	RCB	Emmitt Thomas‡
Karl Kassulke	LS	Jim Kearney
Paul Krause‡	RS	Johnny Robinson‡

== Players' shares ==
As with the previous three Super Bowls, the players' shares were $15,000 each for the winning team and $7,500 each for the losing team. This was in addition to the league championship money earned a week earlier, approximately $8,000 each.

== Officials ==
- Referee: John McDonough (AFL) #11
- Umpire: Lou Palazzi (NFL) #51
- Head linesman: Harry Kessel (AFL) #34
- Line judge: Bill Schleibaum (NFL) #28
- Back judge: Tom Kelleher (NFL) #25
- Field judge: Charlie Musser (AFL) #55

This was the first Super Bowl for all six officials, and the only one for McDonough, Kessel and Schleibaum. It was the first of a record five for Kelleher.

Note: A seven-official system was not used until 1978

== See also ==
- 1969 NFL season
- 1969–70 NFL playoffs
- 1969 American Football League season
- 1969 American Football League playoffs
- List of Super Bowl champions
