= 1969 Minnesota Vikings season =

NFL team season

- General manager: Jim Finks
- Head coach: Bud Grant
- Home stadium: Metropolitan Stadium; Memorial Stadium (October 5)

Results
- Record: 12–2
- Division place: 1st NFL Central
- Playoffs: Won Western Conference Championship Game (vs. Rams) 23–20; Won NFL Championship (vs. Browns) 27–7; Lost Super Bowl IV (vs. Chiefs) 7–23
- All-Pros: DE Carl Eller (1st team); C Mick Tingelhoff (1st team); T Grady Alderman (2nd team); CB Bobby Bryant (2nd team) (2nd team); S Paul Krause (2nd team); DE Jim Marshall (2nd team); DT Alan Page (2nd team); WR Gene Washington
- Pro Bowlers: DE Carl Eller; C Mick Tingelhoff; WR Gene Washington; DT Alan Page; T Grady Alderman; DE Jim Marshall; S Paul Krause; QB Joe Kapp; DT Gary Larsen

Uniform
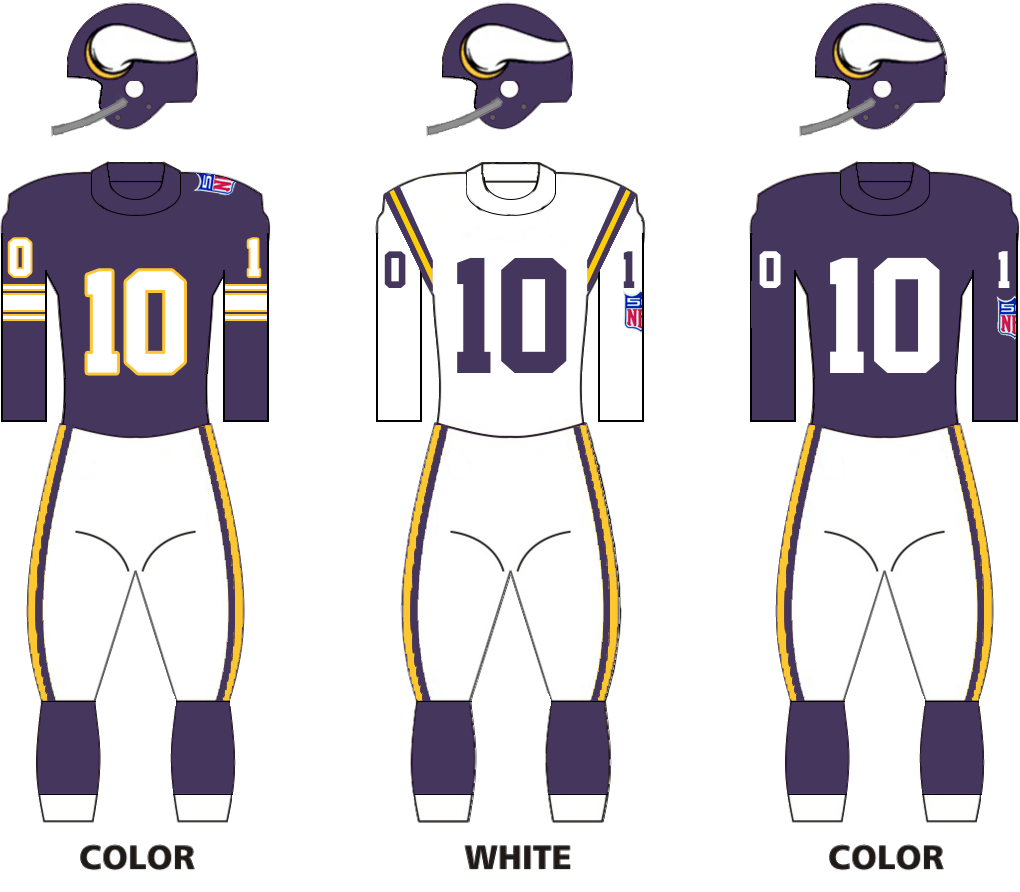

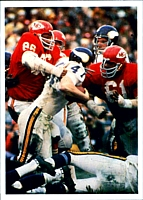
The Vikings played the Chiefs in Super Bowl IV.

The 1969 season was the Minnesota Vikings' ninth season in the National Football League (NFL) and their third under head coach Bud Grant. With a 12–2 record, the best in the league, the Vikings won the NFL Central division title, to qualify for the playoffs for the second year in a row. This was the first of three consecutive seasons as the best team in the NFL for the Vikings. They beat the Los Angeles Rams in the Western Conference Championship Game, and the Cleveland Browns in the final NFL Championship Game before the merger with the American Football League. With these wins, the Vikings became the last team to officially win the Ed Thorp Memorial Trophy, introduced 35 years earlier in 1934.

However, Minnesota lost Super Bowl IV in New Orleans to the AFL champion Kansas City Chiefs in the final professional football game between the two leagues. It was the second consecutive Super Bowl win for the younger league.

The season was chronicled for America's Game: The Missing Rings, as the second greatest NFL team to never win the Super Bowl, only behind the 1981 San Diego Chargers.

== Offseason ==
=== 1969 draft ===
| Pro Bowler |

1969 Minnesota Vikings Draft
| Draft order | | Player name | Position | College | Notes |
| Round | Selection | Player name | Position | College | Notes |
|---|---|---|---|---|---|
| 1 | 17 | Traded to the New Orleans Saints (Note: The Vikings traded their first-round selection (17th overall) and a 1968 first-round selection (7th overall) to the Saints in exchange for QB Gary Cuozzo.) | | | |
| 2 | 39 | Ed White | Guard | California | from Giants (Note: The Vikings traded QB Fran Tarkenton to the Giants in exchange for a second- (39th overall), a 1967 first- (2nd overall), a second- (28th overall) and a 1968 first-round selection (1st overall).) |
| 2 | 43 | Volly Murphy | Wide receiver | UTEP | |
| 3 | 69 | Traded to the Philadelphia Eagles (Note: The Vikings traded their third-round selection (69th overall) to the Eagles in exchange for QB King Hill.) | | | |
| 4 | 95 | Mike McCaffrey | Linebacker | California | |
| 5 | 106 | Jim Barnes | Guard | Arkansas | from Falcons (Note: The Vikings traded QB Ron Vander Kelen to the Falcons in exchange for a fifth-round selection (106th overall) and a 1968 seventh-round selection (167th overall).) |
| 5 | 112 | Mike O'Shea | Wide receiver | Utah State | from Lions via Steelers (Note: The Vikings traded RB Bobby Walden to the Steelers in exchange for a fifth-round selection (112th overall).) |
| 5 | 121 | Cornelius Davis | Running back | Kansas State | |
| 6 | 148 | Marion Bates | Defensive back | Texas Southern | Originally Chargers pick (Note: The Vikings originally had the 147th overall selection but passed, allowing the Chargers to move up, giving Minnesota the 148th overall selection.) |
| 7 | 173 | Traded to the Washington Redskins (Note: The Vikings traded their seventh-round selection (173rd overall) to the Redskins in exchange for S Paul Krause.) | | | |
| 8 | 199 | Harrison Wood | Wide receiver | Washington | |
| 9 | 225 | Tom Fink | Guard | Minnesota | |
| 10 | 253 | Tom McCauley | Defensive back | Wisconsin | originally Cardinals pick (Note: The Vikings originally had the 251st overall selection but passed, allowing the Chargers and Cardinals to move up, giving Minnesota the 253rd overall selection.) |
| 11 | 277 | Brian Dowling | Quarterback | Yale | |
| 12 | 303 | Noel Jenke | Linebacker | Minnesota | |
| 13 | 329 | Jim Moylan | Defensive tackle | Texas Tech | |
| 14 | 355 | Tommy Head | Center | Southwest Texas State | |
| 15 | 381 | Eugene Mosley | Tight end | Jackson State | |
| 16 | 407 | Traded to the Detroit Lions (Note: The Vikings traded their 16th-round selection (407th overall) to the Lions in exchange for a 1968 17th-round selection (445th overall).) | | | |
| 17 | 433 | Wendell Housley | Running back | Texas A&M | |

== Roster ==
1969 Minnesota Vikings roster
| Quarterbacks (QB): 15 Gary Cuozzo; 11 Joe Kapp; 19 Bob Lee P; Running backs (RB): 30 Bill Brown; 35 Billy Harris; 26 Clinton Jones; 21 Jim Lindsey; 41 Dave Osborn; 32 Oscar Reed; Wide receivers (WR): 27 Bob Grim; 80 John Henderson; 84 Gene Washington; Tight ends (TE): 87 John Beasley; 89 Kent Kramer | Offensive linemen (OL): 67 Grady Alderman T; 66 Bookie Bolin G; 71 Doug Davis T; 64 Milt Sunde G; 53 Mick Tingelhoff C; 63 Jim Vellone G; 62 Ed White G; 73 Ron Yary T; Defensive linemen (DL): 76 Paul Dickson DT; 81 Carl Eller DE; 77 Gary Larsen DT; 70 Jim Marshall DE; 88 Alan Page DT; 74 Steve Smith DE | Linebackers (LB): 50 Jim Hargrove OLB; 58 Wally Hilgenberg MLB; 55 Mike McGill MLB; 59 Lonnie Warwick MLB; 60 Roy Winston OLB; Defensive backs (DB): 49 Dale Hackbart FS; 29 Karl Kassulke SS; 22 Paul Krause FS; 46 Earsell Mackbee CB; 45 Ed Sharockman CB; 40 Charlie West SS; Special teams (ST): 14 Fred Cox K | Practice squad: 20 Bobby Bryant CB; -- Len Johnson C; -- Gayle Knief WR; 52 Mike Reilly LB; -- Harrison Wood WR; Reserve: -- Zeke Bratkowski QB (DNR); 28 Earl Denny RB (IR); -- Mike McCaffrey LB (IR); -- Volley Murphy WR (Military); -- Tom Sakal S (Military); Rookies in italics |

== Preseason ==
| Week | Date | Opponent | Result | Record | Venue | Attendance |
|---|---|---|---|---|---|---|
| 1 | August 2 | at Miami Dolphins (AFL) | W 45–10 | 1–0 | Tampa Stadium (Tampa, FL) | 37,461 |
| 2 | August 9 | Denver Broncos (AFL) | W 26–6 | 2–0 | Metropolitan Stadium | 45,918 |
| 3 | August 23 | St. Louis Cardinals | W 41–13 | 3–0 | Memorial Stadium (Memphis, TN) | 34,417 |
| 4 | August 30 | New York Jets (AFL) | L 21–24 | 3–1 | Groves Stadium (Winston-Salem, NC) | 31,500 |
| 5 | September 6 | New York Giants | W 28–27 | 4–1 | Metropolitan Stadium | 47,900 |
| 6 | September 13 | at Cleveland Browns | W 23–16 | 5–1 | Rubber Bowl (Akron, OH) | 28,551 |

== Regular season ==
The Vikings, led by head coach Bud Grant, ended the season with an NFL-best 12–2 regular season record, leading the league in total points scored (379) and fewest points allowed (133), scoring 50 or more points in three of their games. They had 12 straight victories, the longest single-season winning streak in 35 years, and became the first modern NFL expansion team to win an NFL championship. Their defense, considered the most intimidating in the NFL, was anchored by a defensive line nicknamed the "Purple People Eaters", consisting of defensive tackles Gary Larsen and Alan Page, and defensive ends Carl Eller and Jim Marshall. The secondary was led by defensive backs Bobby Bryant (8 interceptions, 97 return yards), Earsell Mackbee (6 interceptions, 100 return yards) and future Pro Football Hall of Famer Paul Krause (5 interceptions, 82 return yards, 1 touchdown).

On offense, quarterback Joe Kapp was known for his superb leadership and his running ability, both throwing on the run and running for extra yards. And when Kapp did take off and run, instead of sliding when he was about to be tackled like most quarterbacks, he lowered his shoulder and went right at the tackler. This style of play earned him the nickname "Indestructible". In the NFL championship game against the Cleveland Browns, he collided with linebacker Jim Houston while running for a first down, and Houston had to be helped off the field after the play ended. Kapp was also known for being an extremely unselfish leader: when he was voted the Vikings' Most Valuable Player, he turned the award down and said that every player on the team was equally valuable.

Running back Dave Osborn was the team's top rusher with 643 yards and 7 touchdowns. He also caught 22 passes for 236 yards and another touchdown. In the passing game, Pro Bowl wide receiver Gene Washington averaged 21.1 yards per catch, recording 821 yards and 9 touchdowns off just 39 receptions. Wide receiver John Henderson caught 34 passes for 553 yards and 5 touchdowns. The Vikings offensive line was anchored by Pro Bowlers Grady Alderman and Mick Tingelhoff.

The Vikings clinched the division title in week 11, after their second defeat of the Detroit Lions on November 27, which also secured home-field advantage for the NFL playoffs. The playoff sites were rotated until 1975; the Central division hosted the Coastal (as in 1967), and the Western Conference hosted the NFL championship game in odd-numbered years.

=== Schedule ===
| Week | Date | Opponent | Result | Record | Venue | Attendance | Recap |
|---|---|---|---|---|---|---|---|
| 1 | September 21 | at New York Giants | **L** 23–24 | 0–1 | Yankee Stadium | 62,900 | Recap |
| 2 | September 28 | Baltimore Colts | **W** 52–14 | 1–1 | Metropolitan Stadium | 47,900 | Recap |
| 3 | October 5 | **Green Bay Packers** | **W** 19–7 | 2–1 | Memorial Stadium ^ | 60,740 | Recap |
| 4 | October 12 | at **Chicago Bears** | **W** 31–0 | 3–1 | Wrigley Field | 45,757 | Recap |
| 5 | October 19 | at St. Louis Cardinals | **W** 27–10 | 4–1 | Busch Memorial Stadium | 49,430 | Recap |
| 6 | October 26 | **Detroit Lions** | **W** 24–10 | 5–1 | Metropolitan Stadium | 47,900 | Recap |
| 7 | November 2 | **Chicago Bears** | **W** 31–14 | 6–1 | Metropolitan Stadium | 47,900 | Recap |
| 8 | November 9 | Cleveland Browns | **W** 51–3 | 7–1 | Metropolitan Stadium | 47,900 | Recap |
| 9 | November 16 | at **Green Bay Packers** | **W** 9–7 | 8–1 | Milwaukee County Stadium | 48,321 | Recap |
| 10 | November 23 | Pittsburgh Steelers | **W** 52–14 | 9–1 | Metropolitan Stadium | 47,202 | Recap |
| 11 | November 27 | at **Detroit Lions** | **W** 27–0 | 10–1 | Tiger Stadium | 57,906 | Recap |
| 12 | December 7 | at Los Angeles Rams | **W** 20–13 | 11–1 | Los Angeles Memorial Coliseum | 80,430 | Recap |
| 13 | December 14 | San Francisco 49ers | **W** 10–7 | 12–1 | Metropolitan Stadium | 43,028 | Recap |
| 14 | December 21 | at Atlanta Falcons | **L** 3–10 | 12–2 | Atlanta Stadium | 52,872 | Recap |
Note: Intra-division opponents are in **bold** text.

^ The October 5 game was played in Minneapolis at Memorial Stadium at the University of Minnesota, due to a clash with the Minnesota Twins hosting game three of the 1969 ALCS at Metropolitan Stadium on Monday, October 6.

=== Game summaries ===
==== Week 1: at New York Giants ====
Week 1: Minnesota Vikings at New York Giants – Game summary

| Quarter | 1 | 2 | 3 | 4 | Total |
|---|---|---|---|---|---|
| Vikings | 3 | 14 | 3 | 3 | **23** |
| **Giants** | 3 | 7 | 0 | 14 | **24** |

at Yankee Stadium, Bronx, New York

- Date: September 21
- Game weather: 58 °F (14 °C)
- Game attendance: 62,900
- Referee: Jim Tunney
- TV announcers (CBS): Jack Whitaker and Frank Gifford
- Pro-Football-Reference.com

Game information

**First quarter**

- NYG – Pete Gogolak 25-yard field goal. Giants 3–0.
- MIN – Fred Cox 11-yard field goal. Tied 3–3.

**Second quarter**

- MIN – John Henderson 47-yard pass from Gary Cuozzo (Fred Cox kick). Vikings 10–3.
- MIN – Gene Washington 48-yard pass from Gary Cuozzo (Fred Cox kick). Vikings 17–3.
- NYG – Homer Jones 54-yard pass from Fran Tarkenton (Pete Gogolak kick). Vikings 17–10.

**Third quarter**

- MIN – Fred Cox 17-yard field goal. Vikings 20–10.

**Fourth quarter**

- MIN – Fred Cox 10-yard field goal. Vikings 23–10.
- NYG – Don Herrmann 16-yard pass from Fran Tarkenton (Pete Gogolak kick). Vikings 23–17.
- NYG – Don Herrmann 10-yard pass from Fran Tarkenton (Pete Gogolak kick). Giants 24–23.

**Top passers**

- MIN – Gary Cuozzo – 13/28, 255 yards, 2 TD
- NYG – Fran Tarkenton – 19/34, 224 yards, 3 TD

**Top rushers**

- MIN – Dave Osborn – 22 rushes, 58 yards
- NYG – Tucker Frederickson – 13 rushes, 77 yards

**Top receivers**

- MIN – Gene Washington – 7 receptions, 152 yards, TD
- NYG – Homer Jones – 3 receptions, 100 yards, TD

==== Week 2: vs. Baltimore Colts ====
Week 2: Baltimore Colts at Minnesota Vikings – Game summary

| Quarter | 1 | 2 | 3 | 4 | Total |
|---|---|---|---|---|---|
| Colts | 0 | 7 | 7 | 0 | **14** |
| **Vikings** | 14 | 17 | 14 | 7 | **52** |

at Metropolitan Stadium, Bloomington, Minnesota

- Date: September 28
- Game weather: 53 °F (12 °C)
- Game attendance: 47,900
- Pro-Football-Reference.com

Game information

**First quarter**

- MIN – Dave Osborn 18-yard pass from Joe Kapp (Fred Cox kick). Vikings 7–0.
- MIN – Gene Washington 83-yard pass from Joe Kapp (Fred Cox kick). Vikings 14–0.

**Second quarter**

- BAL – Tom Matte 42-yard pass from Earl Morrall (Lou Michaels kick). Vikings 14–7.
- MIN – Bob Grim 21-yard pass from Joe Kapp (Fred Cox kick). Vikings 21–7.
- MIN – Fred Cox 40-yard field goal. Vikings 24–7.
- MIN – Kent Kramer 13-yard pass from Joe Kapp (Fred Cox kick). Vikings 31–7.

**Third quarter**

- MIN – Gene Washington 42-yard pass from Joe Kapp (Fred Cox kick). Vikings 38–7.
- BAL – Tom Matte 4-yard run (Lou Michaels kick). Vikings 38–14.
- MIN – John Beasley 1-yard pass from Joe Kapp (Fred Cox kick). Vikings 45–14.

**Fourth quarter**

- MIN – Jim Lindsey 15-yard pass from Joe Kapp (Fred Cox kick). Vikings 52–14.

**Top passers**

- BAL – Earl Morrall – 12/20, 127 yards, TD
- MIN – Joe Kapp – 28/43, 449 yards, **7 TD (NFL record)**

**Top rushers**

- BAL – Tom Matte – 6 rushes, 24 yards, TD
- MIN – Oscar Reed – 6 rushes, 29 yards

**Top receivers**

- BAL – Tom Matte – 4 receptions, 54 yards, TD
- MIN – Gene Washington – 6 receptions, 172 yards, 2 TD

==== Week 3: vs. Green Bay Packers ====
Week 3: Green Bay Packers at Minnesota Vikings – Game summary

| Quarter | 1 | 2 | 3 | 4 | Total |
|---|---|---|---|---|---|
| Packers | 0 | 0 | 0 | 7 | **7** |
| **Vikings** | 6 | 7 | 3 | 3 | **19** |

at Memorial Stadium, Minneapolis, Minnesota

- Date: October 5
- Game weather: 66 °F (19 °C)
- Game attendance: 60,740
- Pro-Football-Reference.com

Game information

**First quarter**

- MIN – Fred Cox 33-yard field goal. Vikings 3–0.
- MIN – Fred Cox 27-yard field goal. Vikings 6–0.

**Second quarter**

- MIN – Dave Osborn 3-yard run (Fred Cox kick). Vikings 13–0.

**Third quarter**

- MIN – Fred Cox 41-yard field goal. Vikings 16–0.

**Fourth quarter**

- MIN – Fred Cox 32-yard field goal. Vikings 19–0.
- GB – Dave Hampton 7-yard pass from Bart Starr (Mike Mercer kick). Vikings 19–7.

**Top passers**

- GB – Bart Starr – 18/31, 128 yards, TD
- MIN – Joe Kapp – 7/21, 100 yards

**Top rushers**

- GB – Bart Starr – 2 rushes, 31 yards
- MIN – Oscar Reed – 14 rushes, 72 yards

**Top receivers**

- GB – Boyd Dowler – 3 receptions, 37 yards
- MIN – Gene Washington – 3 receptions, 73 yards

==== Week 4: at Chicago Bears ====
Week 4: Minnesota Vikings at Chicago Bears – Game summary

| Quarter | 1 | 2 | 3 | 4 | Total |
|---|---|---|---|---|---|
| **Vikings** | 7 | 0 | 7 | 17 | **31** |
| Bears | 0 | 0 | 0 | 0 | **0** |

at Wrigley Field, Chicago, Illinois

- Date: October 12
- Game weather: 56 °F (13 °C)
- Game attendance: 45,757
- Pro-Football-Reference.com

Game information

**First quarter**

- MIN – Mike Reilly 0-yard fumble return (Fred Cox kick). Vikings 7–0.

**Second quarter**

- No scoring plays.

**Third quarter**

- MIN – John Beasley 1-yard pass from Joe Kapp (Fred Cox kick). Vikings 14–0.

**Fourth quarter**

- MIN – Fred Cox 24-yard field goal. Vikings 17–0.
- MIN – Clint Jones 18-yard run (Fred Cox kick). Vikings 24–0.
- MIN – Dave Osborn 58-yard run (Fred Cox kick). Vikings 31–0.

**Top passers**

- MIN – Joe Kapp – 9/19, 110 yards, TD
- CHI – Jack Concannon – 11/15, 71 yards

**Top rushers**

- MIN – Dave Osborn – 15 rushes, 106 yards, TD
- CHI – Ronnie Bull – 6 rushes, 20 yards

**Top receivers**

- MIN – John Beasley – 4 receptions, 36 yards, TD
- CHI – Ray Ogden – 2 receptions, 32 yards

==== Week 5: at St. Louis Cardinals ====
Week 5: Minnesota Vikings at St. Louis Cardinals – Game summary

| Quarter | 1 | 2 | 3 | 4 | Total |
|---|---|---|---|---|---|
| **Vikings** | 7 | 7 | 7 | 6 | **27** |
| Cardinals | 3 | 7 | 0 | 0 | **10** |

at Busch Memorial Stadium, St. Louis, Missouri

- Date: October 19
- Game weather: 55 °F (13 °C)
- Game attendance: 49,430
- Pro-Football-Reference.com

Game information

**First quarter**

- STL – Jim Bakken 26-yard field goal. Cardinals 3–0.
- MIN – John Beasley 12-yard pass from Joe Kapp (Fred Cox kick). Vikings 7–3.

**Second quarter**

- STL – Bob Rowe 18-yard interception return (Jim Bakken kick). Cardinals 10–7.
- MIN – John Henderson 7-yard pass from Joe Kapp (Fred Cox kick). Vikings 14–10.

**Third quarter**

- MIN – John Henderson 39-yard pass from Joe Kapp (Fred Cox kick). Vikings 21–10.

**Fourth quarter**

- MIN – Fred Cox 21-yard field goal. Vikings 24–10.
- MIN – Fred Cox 15-yard field goal. Vikings 27–10.

**Top passers**

- MIN – Joe Kapp – 14/31, 243 yards, 3 TD
- STL – Charley Johnson – 12/28, 96 yards

**Top rushers**

- MIN – Dave Osborn – 16 rushes, 44 yards
- STL – Cid Edwards – 11 rushes, 35 yards

**Top receivers**

- MIN – Gene Washington – 4 receptions, 96 yards
- STL – Dave Williams – 6 receptions, 49 yards

==== Week 6: vs. Detroit Lions ====
Week 6: Detroit Lions at Minnesota Vikings – Game summary

| Quarter | 1 | 2 | 3 | 4 | Total |
|---|---|---|---|---|---|
| Lions | 0 | 3 | 0 | 7 | **10** |
| **Vikings** | 3 | 21 | 0 | 0 | **24** |

at Metropolitan Stadium, Bloomington, Minnesota

- Date: October 26
- Game weather: 40 °F (4 °C)
- Game attendance: 47,900
- Pro-Football-Reference.com

Game information

**First quarter**

- MIN – Fred Cox 33-yard field goal. Vikings 3–0.

**Second quarter**

- MIN – Gene Washington 41-yard pass from Joe Kapp (Fred Cox kick). Vikings 10–0.
- DET – Errol Mann 50-yard field goal. Vikings 10–3.
- MIN – Bill Brown 1-yard run (Fred Cox kick). Vikings 17–3.
- MIN – Dave Osborn 1-yard run (Fred Cox kick). Vikings 24–3.

**Third quarter**

- No scoring plays.

**Fourth quarter**

- DET – Nick Eddy 1-yard run (Errol Mann kick). Vikings 24–10.

**Top passers**

- DET – Greg Landry – 14/28, 116 yards
- MIN – Joe Kapp – 11/19, 167 yards, TD

**Top rushers**

- DET – Greg Landry – 8 rushes, 40 yards
- MIN – Bill Brown – 12 rushes, 33 yards, TD

**Top receivers**

- DET – Earl McCullough – 4 receptions, 44 yards
- MIN – Gene Washington – 4 receptions, 68 yards, TD

==== Week 7: vs. Chicago Bears ====
Week 7: Chicago Bears at Minnesota Vikings – Game summary

| Quarter | 1 | 2 | 3 | 4 | Total |
|---|---|---|---|---|---|
| Bears | 0 | 7 | 0 | 7 | **14** |
| **Vikings** | 7 | 10 | 7 | 7 | **31** |

at Metropolitan Stadium, Bloomington, Minnesota

- Date: November 2
- Game weather: 40 °F (4 °C)
- Game attendance: 47,900
- Pro-Football-Reference.com

Game information

**First quarter**

- MIN – Gene Washington 20-yard pass from Joe Kapp (Fred Cox kick). Vikings 7–0.

**Second quarter**

- CHI – Brian Piccolo 7-yard run (Mac Percival kick). Tied 7–7.
- MIN – Fred Cox 48-yard field goal. Vikings 10–7.
- MIN – John Beasley 13-yard pass from Joe Kapp (Fred Cox kick). Vikings 17–7.

**Third quarter**

- MIN – Dave Osborn 1-yard run (Fred Cox kick). Vikings 24–7.

**Fourth quarter**

- MIN – Clint Jones 80-yard run (Fred Cox kick). Vikings 31–7.
- CHI – Gale Sayers 24-yard run (Mac Percival kick). Vikings 31–14.

**Top passers**

- CHI – Bobby Douglass – 9/15, 93 yards
- MIN – Joe Kapp – 9/18, 133 yards, 2 TD

**Top rushers**

- CHI – Gale Sayers – 20 rushes, 116 yards, TD
- MIN – Clint Jones – 3 rushes, 88 yards, TD

**Top receivers**

- CHI – Austin Denney – 1 reception, 29 yards
- MIN – John Henderson – 2 receptions, 64 yards

==== Week 8: vs. Cleveland Browns ====
Week 8: Cleveland Browns at Minnesota Vikings – Game summary

| Quarter | 1 | 2 | 3 | 4 | Total |
|---|---|---|---|---|---|
| Browns | 0 | 3 | 0 | 0 | **3** |
| **Vikings** | 10 | 17 | 7 | 17 | **51** |

at Metropolitan Stadium, Bloomington, Minnesota

- Date: November 9
- Game weather: 46 °F (8 °C)
- Game attendance: 47,900
- Pro-Football-Reference.com

Game information

**First quarter**

- MIN – Gene Washington 16-yard pass from Joe Kapp (Fred Cox kick). Vikings 7–0.
- MIN – Fred Cox 32-yard field goal. Vikings 10–0.

**Second quarter**

- MIN – Gene Washington 10-yard pass from Joe Kapp (Fred Cox kick). Vikings 17–0.
- CLE – Don Cockroft 28-yard field goal. Vikings 17–3.
- MIN – Fred Cox 28-yard field goal. Vikings 20–3.
- MIN – Gene Washington 1-yard pass from Joe Kapp (Fred Cox kick). Vikings 27–3.

**Third quarter**

- MIN – Dave Osborn 5-yard run (Fred Cox kick). Vikings 34–3.

**Fourth quarter**

- MIN – Clint Jones 1-yard run (Fred Cox kick). Vikings 41–3.
- MIN – Fred Cox 32-yard field goal. Vikings 44–3.
- MIN – Jim Lindsey 2-yard run (Fred Cox kick). Vikings 51–3.

**Top passers**

- CLE – Bill Nelsen – 7/16, 95 yards
- MIN – Joe Kapp – 16/24, 223 yards, 3 TD

**Top rushers**

- CLE – Leroy Kelly – 6 rushes, 24 yards
- MIN – Oscar Reed – 9 rushes, 51 yards

**Top receivers**

- CLE – Dave Jones – 2 receptions, 33 yards
- MIN – Gene Washington – 7 receptions, 119 yards, 3 TD

==== Week 9: at Green Bay Packers ====
Week 9: Minnesota Vikings at Green Bay Packers – Game summary

| Quarter | 1 | 2 | 3 | 4 | Total |
|---|---|---|---|---|---|
| **Vikings** | 3 | 0 | 3 | 3 | **9** |
| Packers | 0 | 7 | 0 | 0 | **7** |

at Milwaukee County Stadium, Milwaukee, Wisconsin

- Date: November 16
- Game weather: 28 °F (−2 °C)
- Game attendance: 48,321
- Pro-Football-Reference.com

Game information

**First quarter**

- MIN – Fred Cox 10-yard field goal. Vikings 3–0.

**Second quarter**

- GB – Doug Hart 85-yard interception return (Mike Mercer kick). Packers 7–3.

**Third quarter**

- MIN – Fred Cox 12-yard field goal. Packers 7–6.

**Fourth quarter**

- MIN – Fred Cox 20-yard field goal. Vikings 9–7.

**Top passers**

- MIN – Gary Cuozzo – 11/16, 105 yards
- GB – Bart Starr – 12/21, 151 yards

**Top rushers**

- MIN – Dave Osborn – 14 rushes, 58 yards
- GB – Dave Hampton – 7 rushes, 39 yards

**Top receivers**

- MIN – Gene Washington – 4 receptions, 44 yards
- GB – Carroll Dale – 3 receptions, 61 yards

==== Week 10: vs. Pittsburgh Steelers ====
Week 10: Pittsburgh Steelers at Minnesota Vikings – Game summary

| Quarter | 1 | 2 | 3 | 4 | Total |
|---|---|---|---|---|---|
| Steelers | 0 | 7 | 7 | 0 | **14** |
| **Vikings** | 7 | 10 | 14 | 21 | **52** |

at Metropolitan Stadium, Bloomington, Minnesota

- Date: November 23
- Game weather: 32 °F (0 °C)
- Game attendance: 47,202
- Pro-Football-Reference.com

Game information

**First quarter**

- MIN – Paul Krause 77-yard interception return (Fred Cox kick). Vikings 7–0.

**Second quarter**

- MIN – Fred Cox 22-yard field goal. Vikings 10–0.
- PIT – Don McCall 101-yard kickoff return (Gene Mingo kick). Vikings 10–7.
- MIN – Bill Brown 1-yard run (Fred Cox kick). Vikings 17–7.

**Third quarter**

- MIN – John Henderson 28-yard pass from Gary Cuozzo (Fred Cox kick). Vikings 24–7.
- PIT – Jon Henderson 10-yard pass from Terry Hanratty (Gene Mingo kick). Vikings 24–14.
- MIN – John Beasley 60-yard fumble return (Fred Cox kick). Vikings 31–14.

**Fourth quarter**

- MIN – Oscar Reed 6-yard pass from Gary Cuozzo (Fred Cox kick). Vikings 38–14.
- MIN – Oscar Reed 1-yard run (Fred Cox kick). Vikings 45–14.
- MIN – John Henderson 7-yard pass from Bob Lee (Fred Cox kick). Vikings 52–14.

**Top passers**

- PIT – Dick Shiner – 8/15, 86 yards
- MIN – Gary Cuozzo – 12/19, 142 yards, 2 TD

**Top rushers**

- PIT – Warren Bankston – 10 rushes, 29 yards
- MIN – Dave Osborn – 13 rushes, 50 yards

**Top receivers**

- PIT – Roy Jefferson – 7 receptions, 72 yards
- MIN – John Beasley – 5 receptions, 68 yards

==== Week 11: at Detroit Lions ====
Week 11: Minnesota Vikings (9–1) at Detroit Lions (7–3)

| Quarter | 1 | 2 | 3 | 4 | Total |
|---|---|---|---|---|---|
| **Vikings** | 7 | 3 | 7 | 10 | **27** |
| Lions | 0 | 0 | 0 | 0 | **0** |

at Tiger Stadium, Detroit, Michigan

- Date: November 27
- Game weather: Snow, 36 °F (2 °C)
- Game attendance: 57,906
- Box Score

Game information

**First quarter**

- MIN – Dave Osborn 1-yard run (Fred Cox kick). Vikings 7–0.

**Second quarter**

- MIN – Fred Cox 41-yard field goal. Vikings 10–0.

**Third quarter**

- MIN – Oscar Reed 6-yard pass from Joe Kapp (Fred Cox kick). Vikings 17–0.

**Fourth quarter**

- MIN – Alan Page 15-yard interception return on a lateral (Fred Cox kick). Vikings 24–0.
- MIN – Fred Cox 38-yard field goal. Vikings 27–0.

**Top passers**

- MIN – Joe Kapp – 7/12, 61 yards, TD, INT
- DET – Greg Landry – 12/25, 93 yards, 2 INT

**Top rushers**

- MIN – Dave Osborn – 15 rushes, 36 yards, TD
- DET – Nick Eddy – 11 rushes, 26 yards

**Top receivers**

- MIN – Dave Osborn – 2 receptions, 27 yards
- DET – Charlie Sanders – 3 receptions, 47 yards

==== Week 12: at Los Angeles Rams ====
Week 12: Minnesota Vikings at Los Angeles Rams – Game summary

| Quarter | 1 | 2 | 3 | 4 | Total |
|---|---|---|---|---|---|
| **Vikings** | 7 | 10 | 0 | 3 | **20** |
| Rams | 0 | 3 | 3 | 7 | **13** |

at Los Angeles Memorial Coliseum, Los Angeles, California

- Date: December 7
- Game weather: 57 °F (14 °C)
- Game attendance: 80,430
- Pro-Football-Reference.com

Game information

**First quarter**

- MIN – Dave Osborn 4-yard run (Fred Cox kick). Vikings 7–0.

**Second quarter**

- MIN – Bill Brown 1-yard run (Fred Cox kick). Vikings 14–0.
- LA – Bruce Gossett 37-yard field goal. Vikings 14–3.
- MIN – Fred Cox 39-yard field goal. Vikings 17–3.

**Third quarter**

- LA – Bruce Gossett 27-yard field goal. Vikings 17–6.

**Fourth quarter**

- MIN – Fred Cox 29-yard field goal. Vikings 20–6.
- LA – Larry Smith 4-yard pass from Roman Gabriel (Bruce Gossett kick). Vikings 20–13.

**Top passers**

- MIN – Joe Kapp – 8/16, 72 yards
- LA – Roman Gabriel – 21/37, 186 yards, TD

**Top rushers**

- MIN – Oscar Reed – 8 rushes, 52 yards
- LA – Larry Smith – 16 rushes, 46 yards

**Top receivers**

- MIN – John Henderson – 5 receptions, 56 yards
- LA – Jack Snow – 7 receptions, 72 yards

==== Week 13: vs. San Francisco 49ers ====
Week 13: San Francisco 49ers at Minnesota Vikings – Game summary

| Quarter | 1 | 2 | 3 | 4 | Total |
|---|---|---|---|---|---|
| 49ers | 0 | 0 | 0 | 7 | **7** |
| **Vikings** | 0 | 3 | 0 | 7 | **10** |

at Metropolitan Stadium, Bloomington, Minnesota

- Date: December 14
- Game weather: 22 °F (−6 °C)
- Game attendance: 43,028
- Pro-Football-Reference.com

Game information

**First quarter**

- No scoring plays.

**Second quarter**

- MIN – Fred Cox 37-yard field goal. Vikings 3–0.

**Third quarter**

- No scoring plays.

**Fourth quarter**

- SF – Ted Kwalick 1-yard pass from Steve Spurrier (Momčilo Gavrić kick). 49ers 7–3.
- MIN – Gene Washington 52-yard pass from Joe Kapp (Fred Cox kick). Vikings 10–7.

**Top passers**

- SF – Steve Spurrier – 26/48, 292 yards, TD
- MIN – Joe Kapp – 4/10, 82 yards, TD

**Top rushers**

- SF – Bob Windsor – 1 rush, 5 yards
- MIN – Bill Brown – 17 rushes, 53 yards

**Top receivers**

- SF – Bob Windsor – 6 receptions, 80 yards
- MIN – Gene Washington – 1 reception, 52 yards, TD

==== Week 14: at Atlanta Falcons ====
Week 14: Minnesota Vikings at Atlanta Falcons – Game summary

| Quarter | 1 | 2 | 3 | 4 | Total |
|---|---|---|---|---|---|
| Vikings | 3 | 0 | 0 | 0 | **3** |
| **Falcons** | 0 | 7 | 3 | 0 | **10** |

at Atlanta Stadium, Atlanta, Georgia

- Date: December 21
- Game weather: 36 °F (2 °C)
- Game attendance: 52,872
- Pro-Football-Reference.com

Game information

**First quarter**

- MIN – Fred Cox 19-yard field goal. Vikings 3–0.

**Second quarter**

- ATL – Claude Humphrey 24-yard fumble return (Bob Etter kick). Falcons 7–3.

**Third quarter**

- ATL – Bob Etter 28-yard field goal. Falcons 10–3.

**Fourth quarter**

- No scoring plays.

**Top passers**

- MIN – Gary Cuozzo – 4/13, 62 yards
- ATL – Bob Berry – 6/13, 70 yards

**Top rushers**

- MIN – Oscar Reed – 10 rushes, 79 yards
- ATL – Harmon Wages – 20 rushes, 50 yards

**Top receivers**

- MIN – John Henderson – 3 receptions, 53 yards
- ATL – Gail Cogdill – 1 reception, 52 yards

=== Standings ===
NFL Central
| | W | L | T | PCT | DIV | CONF | PF | PA | STK |
|---|---|---|---|---|---|---|---|---|---|
| Minnesota Vikings | 12 | 2 | 0 | .857 | 6–0 | 9–1 | 379 | 133 | L1 |
| Detroit Lions | 9 | 4 | 1 | .692 | 3–3 | 6–3–1 | 259 | 188 | W2 |
| Green Bay Packers | 8 | 6 | 0 | .571 | 3–3 | 5–5 | 269 | 221 | W2 |
| Chicago Bears | 1 | 13 | 0 | .071 | 0–6 | 0–10 | 210 | 339 | L6 |

Note: Tie games were not officially counted in the standings until 1972.

== Postseason ==
=== Playoffs ===
| Week | Date | Opponent | Result | Venue | Attendance | Recap |
|---|---|---|---|---|---|---|
| Conference | December 27 | Los Angeles Rams | W 23–20 | Metropolitan Stadium | 47,900 | Recap |
| NFL Championship | January 4 | Cleveland Browns | W 27–7 | Metropolitan Stadium | 47,900 | Recap |
| Super Bowl IV | January 11 | Kansas City Chiefs | L 7–23 | Tulane Stadium | 80,562 | Recap |

=== Western Conference Championship Game ===
NFL Western Conference Championship Game: Los Angeles Rams at Minnesota Vikings – Game summary

| Quarter | 1 | 2 | 3 | 4 | Total |
|---|---|---|---|---|---|
| Rams | 7 | 10 | 0 | 3 | 20 |
| Vikings | 7 | 0 | 7 | 9 | 23 |

at Metropolitan Stadium, Bloomington, Minnesota

- Date: December 27
- Game weather: 11 °F (−12 °C)
- Game attendance: 47,900
- TV: CBS
- Pro-Football-Reference.com

Game information

First quarter

- LA – Bob Klein 3-yard pass from Roman Gabriel (Bruce Gossett kick). Rams 7–0
- MIN – Dave Osborn 1-yard run (Fred Cox kick). Tied 7–7

Second quarter

- LA – Bruce Gossett 20-yard field goal. Rams 10–7
- LA – Billy Truax 2-yard pass from Roman Gabriel (Bruce Gossett kick). Rams 17–7

Third quarter

- MIN – Dave Osborn 1-yard run (Fred Cox kick). Rams 17–14

Fourth quarter

- LA – Bruce Gossett 27-yard field goal. Rams 20–14
- MIN – Joe Kapp 2-yard run (Fred Cox kick). Vikings 21–20
- MIN – Roman Gabriel tackled in the end zone by Carl Eller for a safety. Vikings 23–20

Top passers

- LA – Roman Gabriel – 22/32, 150 yards, 2 TD, INT
- MIN – Joe Kapp – 12/19, 196 yards, 2 INT

Top rushers

- LA – Larry Smith – 11 rushes, 60 yards
- MIN – Joe Kapp – 7 rushes, 42 yards, TD

Top receivers

- LA – Billy Truax – 5 receptions, 47 yards, TD
- MIN – Gene Washington – 4 receptions, 90 yards

Three weeks prior to this game, the teams met in Los Angeles in a battle between the undefeated (11–0) Rams and the 10–1 Vikings. The Vikings won that game 20–13. The rematch was played in the cold and snow of Minnesota. Despite committing more turnovers (3 to 1) and only gaining 20 more total yards (275–255), the Vikings managed to edge out the Rams for their first postseason win in franchise history.

In the game in L.A., the Viking defense shut down the Rams' wide receivers and outside running game, so in this game, the Rams attacked the middle of the Viking defense and neutralized the Viking pass rush with short quick passes to the tight ends. The Rams defense held Minnesota's high powered offense in check, with the "Fearsome Foursome" defensive line harassing Viking QB Joe Kapp. Early on, the momentum seemed to be in LA's favor. Rams safety Richie Petitbon recovered a fumble from fullback Bill Brown that gave his team a first down on the Minnesota 45-yard line. On the next play, it appeared that the Vikings took a quick lead as Carl Eller intercepted a Roman Gabriel pass and returned for a touchdown but the score was nullified on an offside penalty on Alan Page. Taking advantage of their second chance, running back Larry Smith gained 19 yards on three carries, and Gabriel eventually finished the drive with a 3-yard touchdown pass to tight end Bob Klein. The Vikings quickly stormed back, with Kapp completing four consecutive passes on a 10-play, 75-yard drive. Three of the completions were to receiver Gene Washington for 49 total yards, including a 27-yard reception that gave the Vikings the ball on the Rams' 4-yard line. Dave Osborn ran for a touchdown on the next play, tying the score at 7 with a little over 3 minutes left in the first quarter.

LA moved the ball effectively on their next drive, but it ended on a missed 38-yard field goal attempt by Bruce Gossett. The next time they got the ball, they did much better, taking up the majority of the second quarter, including a 13-yard run by Gabriel to convert a third down. Gossett finished the drive with a 20-yard field goal to put the Rams up 10–7 with 4:30 left before halftime. Following a punt, Gabriel led his team back for more points. This time he completed passes to tight end Billy Truax for gains of 18 and 16 yards before finishing the 13-play, 65-yard drive with a 2-yard touchdown pass to Truax. The Rams went into halftime leading 17–7, having scored on three of their four first half possessions.

In the second half, Viking coach Bud Grant adjusted his defense to stop the Ram tight ends, and his "Purple People Eaters" continued to punish the Ram running game. They also got increasing pressure on Gabriel. On offense, Grant neutralized the Ram pass rush by having QB Kapp run the ball, either on designed plays like quarterback draws or roll outs, or by instructing him to take off and run at the first sign of pressure. Kapp began frustrating the Rams with runs; this threat caused their pass rush to be less aggressive.

After forcing the Rams to punt for the first time in the game on the opening possession of the second half, Kapp completed a 41-yard pass to Washington on the LA 12-yard line. After a Rams penalty and a 5-yard run by Kapp, Osborn finished the drive with a 1-yard touchdown run that cut Minnesota's deficit to 17–14. However, Minnesota's comeback attempt suffered major setbacks over the next few drives against a punishing effort from the Rams defense. The next time the Vikings got the ball, they drove deep into Rams territory, only to have Kapp throw an interception to safety Ed Meador on the LA 4-yard line. Meador fumbled the ball during the return, but linebacker Jim Purnell recovered it. After an LA punt, Kapp was intercepted again, this time by Petitbon, who returned the ball 4 yards to the Vikings' 36. Once again, the Viking defense bent but didn't break, stopping the Rams inside the 10 yard line and making them settle for a 27-yard Gossett field goal. So instead of being down 24–14, it was only 20–14 going into the fourth quarter.

Kapp subsequently marched the Vikings 65 yards downfield, completing three passes for 40 yards and going the final 2 yards himself as Minnesota took its first lead of the game, 21–20, with 8:24 on the clock. Then the Viking defense took over. After their special teams unit tackled returner Ron Smith on the 12-yard line during the ensuing kickoff, Carl Eller sacked Gabriel in the end zone for a safety, giving the Vikings a 23–20 lead and the ball. But the Rams defense held, and 1969 NFL MVP Gabriel began to march the Rams down field in the last two minutes. As they crossed midfield, it appeared the Rams might get the tying field goal or winning touchdown, but a Gabriel pass was tipped and intercepted at the Viking 40-yard line by Alan Page with 30 seconds left, allowing his team to run out the clock and win.

Gabriel completed 22/30 passes for 150 yards and two touchdowns, with 1 interception, while also rushing for 26 yards. Larry Smith was the top rusher of the game with 11 carries for 60 yards, and he caught 6 passes for 36. Kapp completed 12/19 passes for 196 yards with 2 interceptions, while also rushing for 41 yards and a touchdown. Washington caught 4 passes for 90 yards.

=== NFL Championship Game ===
NFL Championship Game: Cleveland Browns at Minnesota Vikings – Game summary

| Quarter | 1 | 2 | 3 | 4 | Total |
|---|---|---|---|---|---|
| Browns | 0 | 0 | 0 | 7 | 7 |
| Vikings | 14 | 10 | 3 | 0 | 27 |

at Metropolitan Stadium, Bloomington, Minnesota

- Date: January 4
- Game weather: 8 °F (−13 °C)
- Game attendance: 47,900
- TV: CBS
- Pro-Football-Reference.com

Game information

First quarter

- MIN – Joe Kapp 7-yard run (Fred Cox kick). Vikings 7–0.
- MIN – Gene Washington 75-yard pass from Joe Kapp (Fred Cox kick). Vikings 14–0.

Second quarter

- MIN – Fred Cox 30-yard field goal. Vikings 17–0.
- MIN – Dave Osborn 20-yard run (Fred Cox kick). Vikings 24–0.

Third quarter

- MIN – Fred Cox 32-yard field goal. Vikings 27–0.

Fourth quarter

- CLE – Gary Collins 3-yard pass from Bill Nelsen (Don Cockroft kick). Vikings 27–7.

Top passers

- CLE – Bill Nelsen – 17/33, 181 yards, TD
- MIN – Joe Kapp – 7/13, 169 yards, TD

Top rushers

- CLE – Leroy Kelly – 15 rushes, 80 yards
- MIN – Dave Osborn – 18 rushes, 108 yards, TD

Top receivers

- CLE – Bo Scott – 5 receptions, 56 yards
- MIN – Gene Washington – 3 receptions, 120 yards, TD

Cleveland had lost the previous season's NFL title game 34–0, and this time fared little better. The Vikings dominated the game, racking up 381 yards without losing a single turnover, while Cleveland gained just 268 yards and turned the ball over three times.

The Vikings took a lead just four minutes into the first quarter, driving 70 yards for a touchdown in 8 plays. The key play of the drive was a pass from Joe Kapp to receiver Gene Washington that was nearly 5 yards short of the mark. Despite the short throw, Washington was able to come back and haul it in for a 33-yard gain to the Browns' 24-yard line. Two plays later, Dave Osborn's 12-yard run moved the ball to the 7. Then two plays after that, Bill Brown accidentally slipped and bumped into Kapp while moving up to take a handoff, but Kapp simply kept the ball himself and ran it 7 yards for a touchdown.

The situation never got any better for Cleveland. The next time Minnesota got the ball, defensive back Erich Barnes slipped while in one-on-one coverage with Washington, enabling him to catch a pass from Kapp and take off for a 75-yard touchdown completion. Near the end of the first quarter, Browns running back Leroy Kelly lost a fumble that was recovered by linebacker Wally Hilgenberg on the Cleveland 43. Kapp then completed a 12-yard pass to Washington before Fred Cox finished the drive with a 30-yard field goal, putting the Vikings up 17–0. Later in the second period, Hilgenberg snuffed out a Cleveland scoring threat by intercepting a pass from Bill Nelsen on the Vikings' 33-yard line. Minnesota subsequently drove 67 yards in 8 plays. Kapp started the drive with a pair of completions to John Henderson for 17 total yards, while Osborn broke off a 16-yard run and ended up finishing the drive with a 20-yard touchdown burst, giving the Vikings a 24–0 lead with 4:46 left in the first half. Cleveland responded with a drive to the Vikings' 17, but turned the ball over on downs when Nelsen overthrew receiver Gary Collins in the end zone on 4th-and-3.

The third quarter was mostly uneventful, other than Cox's 32-yard field goal that gave Minnesota a 27–0 lead after an 11-play, 80-yard drive. The most noteworthy play was a 13-yard scramble by Kapp in which he plowed into 240-pound Browns linebacker Jim Houston so hard that Houston was knocked out of the game. In the fourth quarter, Cleveland finally got on the board when a diving 18-yard reception by Paul Warfield set up Nelsen's 3-yard touchdown pass to Collins. There were still 13 minutes on the clock at this point, but there would be no more scoring. The Vikings had a drive to the Cleveland 2-yard line, but decided to let the clock run out instead of going for another score.

Kapp completed just seven of 13 pass attempts, but threw for 169 yards and a touchdown, while also rushing for 57 yards and another score. Osborn rushed 18 times for 108 yards and a touchdown. Washington had 120 yards and a touchdown on just three receptions. Kelly was the Browns' top rusher with 80 yards, while also catching two passes for 17. Nelsen completed just 17 of 33 passes for 181 yards, with one touchdown and two interceptions.

=== Super Bowl IV ===
Super Bowl IV: Minnesota Vikings vs. Kansas City Chiefs – Game summary

| Quarter | 1 | 2 | 3 | 4 | Total |
|---|---|---|---|---|---|
| Vikings | 0 | 0 | 7 | 0 | 7 |
| Chiefs | 3 | 13 | 7 | 0 | 23 |

at Tulane Stadium, New Orleans, Louisiana

- Date: January 11
- Game weather: 55 °F (13 °C)
- Game attendance: 80,562
- TV: CBS
- Pro-Football-Reference.com

Game information

First quarter

- KC – Jan Stenerud 48-yard field goal. Chiefs 3–0.

Second quarter

- KC – Jan Stenerud 32-yard field goal. Chiefs 6–0.
- KC – Jan Stenerud 25-yard field goal. Chiefs 9–0.
- KC – Mike Garrett 5-yard run (Jan Stenerud kick). Chiefs 16–0.

Third quarter

- MIN – Dave Osborn 4-yard run (Fred Cox kick). Chiefs 16–7.
- KC – Otis Taylor 46-yard pass from Len Dawson (Jan Stenerud kick). Chiefs 23–7.

Fourth quarter

- No scoring plays.

Top passers

- MIN – Joe Kapp – 16/25, 183 yards
- KC – Len Dawson – 12/17, 142 yards, TD

Top rushers

- MIN – Bill Brown – 6 rushes, 26 yards
- KC – Mike Garrett – 11 rushes, 39 yards, TD

Top receivers

- MIN – John Henderson – 7 receptions, 111 yards
- KC – Otis Taylor – 6 receptions, 81 yards, TD

== Awards and records ==
- Led NFL, points scored (379)
- Led NFL, fewest points allowed (133)
- Joe Kapp – 7 passing touchdowns in a single game (NFL record) – Week 2

== Statistics ==
=== Team leaders ===
| Category | Player(s) | Value |
|---|---|---|
| Passing yards | Joe Kapp | 1,726 |
| Passing touchdowns | Joe Kapp | 19 |
| Rushing yards | Dave Osborn | 643 |
| Rushing touchdowns | Dave Osborn | 7 |
| Receiving yards | Gene Washington | 821 |
| Receiving touchdowns | Gene Washington | 9 |
| Points | Fred Cox | 121 |
| Kickoff return yards | Clint Jones | 444 |
| Punt return yards | Charlie West | 245 |
| Interceptions | Bobby Bryant | 8 |

=== League rankings ===
| Category | Total yards | Yards per game | NFL rank (out of 16) |
|---|---|---|---|
| Passing offense | 2,246 | 160.4 | 12th |
| Rushing offense | 1,850 | 132.1 | 4th |
| Total offense | 4,096 | 292.6 | 10th |
| Passing defense | 1,631 | 116.5 | 1st |
| Rushing defense | 1,089 | 77.8 | 2nd |
| Total defense | 2,720 | 194.3 | 1st |
