= 1970 Minnesota Vikings season =

NFL team season

- General manager: Jim Finks
- Head coach: Bud Grant
- Home stadium: Metropolitan Stadium

Results
- Record: 12–2
- Division place: 1st NFC Central
- Playoffs: Lost Divisional Playoffs (vs. 49ers) 14–17
- All-Pros: DE Carl Eller (1st team); DT Alan Page (1st team)
- Pro Bowlers: K Fred Cox; DE Carl Eller; SS Karl Kassulke; DT Gary Larsen; RB Dave Osborn; DT Alan Page; WR Gene Washington

Uniform
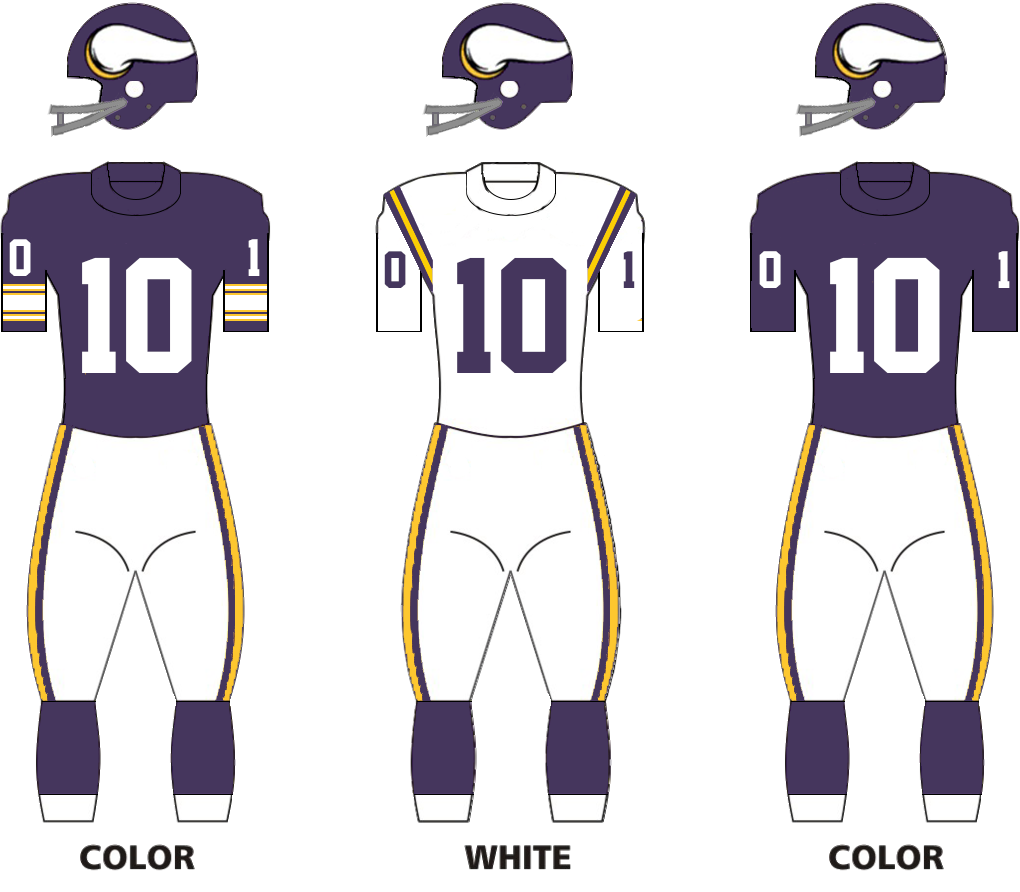

The 1970 season was the Minnesota Vikings' 10th in the National Football League and the first season following the AFL–NFL merger. In their fourth year under head coach Bud Grant, they finished with a 12–2 record and won the first ever NFC Central title before losing to the San Francisco 49ers 17–14 at home in the NFC Divisional Playoff game. The Vikings' defense became the second defense in the history of the NFL to lead the league in fewest points allowed and fewest total yards allowed for two consecutive seasons.

== Offseason ==
=== 1970 draft ===
1970 Minnesota Vikings Draft
| Draft order | | Player name | Position | College | Notes |
| Round | Selection | Player name | Position | College | Notes |
|---|---|---|---|---|---|
| 1 | 25 | John Ward | Offensive tackle | Oklahoma State | |
| 2 | 51 | Bill Cappleman | Quarterback | Florida State | |
| 3 | 77 | Chuck Burgoon | Linebacker | North Park | |
| 4 | 103 | Traded to the New Orleans Saints (Note: The Vikings traded their fourth-round selection (103rd overall) to the Saints in exchange for TE Kent Kramer.) | | | |
| 5 | 129 | Greg Jones | Running back | UCLA | |
| 6 | 155 | Traded to the Pittsburgh Steelers (Note: The Vikings traded their sixth-round selection (155th overall) to the Steelers in exchange for TE Tony Jeter.) | | | |
| 7 | 181 | Hap Farber | Linebacker | Ole Miss | |
| 8 | 207 | Mike Carroll | Guard | Missouri | |
| 9 | 233 | George Morrow | Defensive end | Ole Miss | |
| 10 | 259 | Stu Voigt | Tight end | Wisconsin | |
| 11 | 285 | Godfrey Zaunbrecher | Center | LSU | |
| 12 | 311 | James Holland | Defensive back | Jackson State | |
| 13 | 337 | Robert Pearce | Defensive back | Stephen F. Austin | |
| 14 | 363 | Tommy Spinks | Wide receiver | Louisiana Tech | |
| 15 | 389 | Bennie Francis | Defensive end | Chadron State | |
| 16 | 415 | Bruce Cerone | Wide receiver | Emporia State | |
| 17 | 441 | Brian Healy | Defensive back | Michigan | |

== Roster ==
1970 Minnesota Vikings roster
| Quarterbacks (QB): 15 Gary Cuozzo; 19 Bob Lee; Running backs (RB): 30 Bill Brown; 26 Clinton Jones; 21 Jim Lindsey; 41 Dave Osborn; 32 Oscar Reed; Wide receivers (WR): 27 Bob Grim; 80 John Henderson; 84 Gene Washington; Tight ends (TE): 87 John Beasley; 89 Kent Kramer | Offensive linemen (OL): 67 Grady Alderman T; 71 Doug Davis T; 74 Steve Smith T; 64 Milt Sunde G; 53 Mick Tingelhoff C; 63 Jim Vellone G; 62 Ed White G; 73 Ron Yary T; Defensive linemen (DL): 76 Paul Dickson DT; 81 Carl Eller DE; 77 Gary Larsen DT; 70 Jim Marshall DE; 88 Alan Page DT; 72 John Ward DE | Linebackers (LB): 50 Jim Hargrove MLB; 58 Wally Hilgenberg OLB; 55 Mike McGill OLB; 59 Lonnie Warwick MLB; 60 Roy Winston OLB; Defensive backs (DB): 20 Bobby Bryant CB; 49 Dale Hackbart FS; 29 Karl Kassulke SS; 22 Paul Krause FS; 28 Ted Provost SS; 45 Ed Sharockman CB; 40 Charlie West CB; Special teams (ST): 14 Fred Cox K; 12 Tom McNeill P | Practice squad: 17 Bill Cappleman QB; 25 John Charles S; 66 Wayne Meylan LB; 78 Jerry Patton DT; 83 Stu Voigt TE; 51 Godfrey Zaunbrecher C; Reserve: 35 Billy Harris RB (IR); Rookies in italics |

== Preseason ==
| Week | Date | Opponent | Result | Record | Venue | Attendance |
|---|---|---|---|---|---|---|
| 1 | August 8 | New Orleans Saints | L 13–14 | 0–1 | Fawcett Stadium (Canton, OH) | 17,932 |
| 2 | August 15 | Pittsburgh Steelers | L 13–20 | 0–2 | Metropolitan Stadium | 45,591 |
| 3 | August 22 | at Houston Oilers | W 14–7 | 1–2 | Astrodome | 44,563 |
| 4 | August 30 | New York Jets | W 52–21 | 2–2 | Metropolitan Stadium | 47,900 |
| 5 | September 5 | at Cleveland Browns | W 24–21 | 3–2 | Cleveland Stadium | 83,043 |
| 6 | September 11 | at Chicago Bears | W 31–30 | 4–2 | Soldier Field | 46,630 |

== Regular season ==
=== Schedule ===
| Week | Date | Opponent | Result | Record | Venue | Attendance |
|---|---|---|---|---|---|---|
| 1 | September 20 | Kansas City Chiefs | **W** 27–10 | 1–0 | Metropolitan Stadium | 47,900 |
| 2 | September 27 | New Orleans Saints | **W** 26–0 | 2–0 | Metropolitan Stadium | 47,900 |
| 3 | October 4 | at **Green Bay Packers** | **L** 10–13 | 2–1 | Milwaukee County Stadium | 47,967 |
| 4 | October 11 | at **Chicago Bears** | **W** 24–0 | 3–1 | Wrigley Field | 45,485 |
| 5 | October 18 | Dallas Cowboys | **W** 54–13 | 4–1 | Metropolitan Stadium | 47,900 |
| 6 | October 26 | Los Angeles Rams | **W** 13–3 | 5–1 | Metropolitan Stadium | 47,900 |
| 7 | November 1 | at **Detroit Lions** | **W** 30–17 | 6–1 | Tiger Stadium | 58,210 |
| 8 | November 8 | at Washington Redskins | **W** 19–10 | 7–1 | Robert F. Kennedy Memorial Stadium | 50,415 |
| 9 | November 15 | **Detroit Lions** | **W** 24–20 | 8–1 | Metropolitan Stadium | 47,900 |
| 10 | November 22 | **Green Bay Packers** | **W** 10–3 | 9–1 | Metropolitan Stadium | 47,900 |
| 11 | November 29 | at New York Jets | **L** 10–20 | 9–2 | Shea Stadium | 62,333 |
| 12 | December 5 | **Chicago Bears** | **W** 16–13 | 10–2 | Metropolitan Stadium | 47,900 |
| 13 | December 13 | at Boston Patriots | **W** 35–14 | 11–2 | Harvard Stadium | 37,819 |
| 14 | December 20 | at Atlanta Falcons | **W** 37–7 | 12–2 | Atlanta Stadium | 57,992 |
Note: Intra-division opponents are in **bold** text.

=== Game summaries ===
==== Week 1: vs Kansas City Chiefs ====
Week 1: Kansas City Chiefs at Minnesota Vikings – Game summary

| Quarter | 1 | 2 | 3 | 4 | Total |
|---|---|---|---|---|---|
| Chiefs | 0 | 7 | 3 | 0 | **10** |
| Vikings | 0 | 17 | 0 | 10 | **27** |

at Metropolitan Stadium, Bloomington, Minnesota

- Date: September 20
- Game time: 4:00 p.m. EDT
- Game weather: 70 °F (21 °C)
- Game attendance: 47,900
- Referee: Tommy Bell
- Pro-Football-Reference.com

Game information

**First quarter**

- No scoring plays.

**Second quarter**

- MIN – Fred Cox 20-yard field goal. Vikings 3–0.
- MIN – Roy Winston 36-yard fumble recovery (Fred Cox kick). Vikings 10–0.
- KC – Otis Taylor 59-yard pass from Len Dawson (Jan Stenerud kick). Vikings 10–7.
- MIN – Dave Osborn 1-yard run (Fred Cox kick). Vikings 17–7.

**Third quarter**

- KC – Jan Stenerud 26-yard field goal. Vikings 17–10.

**Fourth quarter**

- MIN – Oscar Reed 1-yard run (Fred Cox kick). Vikings 24–10.
- MIN – Fred Cox 40-yard field goal. Vikings 27–10.

**Top passers**

- KC – Len Dawson – 18/27, 164 yards, TD, 2 INT
- MIN – Gary Cuozzo – 12/20, 100 yards, 2 INT

**Top rushers**

- KC – Wendell Hayes – 7 rushes, 22 yards
- MIN – Bill Brown – 17 rushes, 55 yards

**Top receivers**

- KC – Otis Taylor – 5 receptions, 100 yards, TD
- MIN – John Beasley – 3 receptions, 41 yards

The Vikings opened up the season in a rematch of Super Bowl IV against the Chiefs. This time, the Vikings exacted revenge in a 27-10 win.

=== Standings ===
NFC Central
| | W | L | T | PCT | DIV | CONF | PF | PA | STK |
|---|---|---|---|---|---|---|---|---|---|
| Minnesota Vikings | 12 | 2 | 0 | .857 | 5–1 | 10–1 | 335 | 143 | W3 |
| Detroit Lions | 10 | 4 | 0 | .714 | 4–2 | 7–4 | 347 | 202 | W5 |
| Green Bay Packers | 6 | 8 | 0 | .429 | 2–4 | 4–7 | 196 | 293 | L2 |
| Chicago Bears | 6 | 8 | 0 | .429 | 1–5 | 5–6 | 256 | 261 | W2 |

Note: Tie games were not officially counted in the standings until 1972.

== Postseason ==
=== Schedule ===
| Week | Date | Opponent | Result | Record | Venue | Attendance |
|---|---|---|---|---|---|---|
| Divisional | December 27 | San Francisco 49ers | L 14–17 | 0–1 | Metropolitan Stadium | 46,050 |

== Statistics ==
=== Team leaders ===
| Category | Player(s) | Value |
|---|---|---|
| Passing yards | Gary Cuozzo | 1,720 |
| Passing touchdowns | Gary Cuozzo | 7 |
| Rushing yards | Dave Osborn | 681 |
| Rushing touchdowns | Clint Jones | 9 |
| Receiving yards | Gene Washington | 702 |
| Receiving touchdowns | Gene Washington | 4 |
| Points | Fred Cox | 125 |
| Kickoff return yards | Clint Jones | 452 |
| Punt return yards | Charlie West | 169 |
| Interceptions | Ed Sharockman | 7 |

=== League rankings ===
| Category | Total yards | Yards per game | NFL rank (out of 26) |
|---|---|---|---|
| Passing offense | 2,181 | 155.8 | 14th |
| Rushing offense | 1,634 | 116.7 | 14th |
| Total offense | 3,815 | 272.5 | 19th |
| Passing defense | 1,438 | 102.7 | 1st |
| Rushing defense | 1,365 | 97.5 | 5th |
| Total defense | 2,803 | 200.2 | 1st |
