= 1970–71 NFL playoffs =

American football tournament

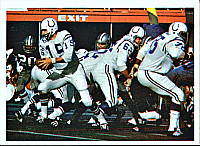
- The Baltimore Colts playing against the Dallas Cowboys in Super Bowl V.
- Dates: December 26, 1970 – January 17, 1971
- Season: 1970
- Teams: 8
- Games played: 7
- Super Bowl V site: Orange Bowl; Miami, Florida
- Defending champions: 1969 Pre-merger: AFL and Super Bowl: Kansas City Chiefs (did not qualify); NFL: Minnesota Vikings
- Champion: Baltimore Colts (3rd title)
- Runner-up: Dallas Cowboys
- Conference runners-up: Oakland Raiders; San Francisco 49ers
NFL playoffs
← 1969–70 ← 1969–70 (AFL)	1971–72 →

The National Football League playoffs for the 1970 season began on December 26, 1970. The postseason tournament concluded with the Baltimore Colts defeating the Dallas Cowboys in Super Bowl V, 16–13, on January 17, 1971, at the Orange Bowl in Miami, Florida.

This was the first playoff tournament after the AFL–NFL merger. An eight-team playoff tournament was designed, with four clubs from each conference qualifying. Along with the three division winners in each conference, one wild card team, the second place team with the best record from each conference, was added to the tournament. The first round was named the Divisional Playoffs, while the Conference Championship games were moved to the second playoff round and the Super Bowl became the league's championship game.

However, the home teams in the playoffs were still decided based on a yearly divisional rotation, excluding the wild card teams, who would always play on the road. Also, a rule was made that two teams from the same division could not meet in the Divisional Playoffs. In the rotation system, teams who hosted and won against the wild card team in the Divisional playoffs never could host the Conference Championship game. Conversely, this meant that the winner of Divisional playoff games that were exclusively between division winners always hosted the Conference Championship game.

This is the most recent year in which all playoff games matched up two teams that had yet to meet in the postseason in a previous year.

== Participants ==
Within each conference, the three division winners and the non-division winner with the best overall regular season record of all remaining teams in the conference qualified for the playoffs. The NFL did not use a seeding system until the 1975 season, and instead home teams during the first two rounds of the playoffs alternated by division. Thus, it is possible that a team could host another club with a better regular season record. For the Super Bowl, the championship round was played at a neutral site, the designated home team was based on an annual rotation by conference.

Playoff participants
	AFC	NFC
East winner	Baltimore Colts	Dallas Cowboys
Central winner	Cincinnati Bengals	Minnesota Vikings
West winner	Oakland Raiders	San Francisco 49ers
Wild card	Miami Dolphins	Detroit Lions

Following the rotational system, the winner of the NFC Central, the Minnesota Vikings, would have met the wild card team. With the Detroit Lions the wild card team was from the same division and hence, the home teams of the NFC switched their opponents.

The defending Super Bowl champion Kansas City Chiefs lost their final two games to finish at 7–5–2, runner-up in the AFC West, and narrowly missed the postseason. They returned to the playoffs the following season.

== Bracket ==
Note: Although the home teams in these playoffs were decided based on a yearly rotation, the home club coincidentally happened to be the one with the better record in every game. Had the playoffs been seeded, the only difference would have been that the #4 wild card Lions, ineligible to play the Vikings, would have played at the #2 49ers and the #3 Cowboys would have played at the #1 Vikings in the NFC divisional playoffs.

Dec 27 – Oakland Coliseum
WC	Miami	14
Jan 3 – Memorial Stadium
West	Oakland	21
AFC
West	Oakland	17
Dec 26 – Memorial Stadium
East	Baltimore	27
AFC Championship
Cent.	Cincinnati	0
Jan 17 – Miami Orange Bowl
East	Baltimore	17
Divisional round
AFC	Baltimore	16
Dec 26 – Cotton Bowl
NFC	Dallas	13
Super Bowl V
WC	Detroit	0
Jan 3 – Kezar Stadium
East	Dallas	5
NFC
East	Dallas	17
Dec 27 – Metropolitan Stadium
West	San Francisco	10
NFC Championship
West	San Francisco	17
Cent.	Minnesota	14

== Schedule ==
In the United States, CBS televised the NFC playoff games, while NBC broadcast the AFC games and Super Bowl V.

Round	Away team	Score	Home team	Date	Kickoff (ET / UTC−5)	TV
Divisional round	Cincinnati Bengals	0–17	Baltimore Colts	December 26, 1970	1:30 p.m.	NBC
Divisional round	Detroit Lions	0–5	Dallas Cowboys	December 26, 1970	4:00 p.m.	CBS
Divisional round	San Francisco 49ers	17–14	Minnesota Vikings	December 27, 1970	1:00 p.m.	CBS
Divisional round	Miami Dolphins	14–21	Oakland Raiders	December 27, 1970	4:00 p.m.	NBC
Conference championships	Oakland Raiders	17–27	Baltimore Colts	January 3, 1971	2:00 p.m.	NBC
Conference championships	Dallas Cowboys	17–10	San Francisco 49ers	January 3, 1971	5:00 p.m.	CBS
Super Bowl V Orange Bowl Miami, Florida	Baltimore Colts	16–13	Dallas Cowboys	January 17, 1971	2:00 p.m.	NBC

== Divisional round ==
=== Saturday, December 26, 1970 ===
==== AFC: Baltimore Colts 17, Cincinnati Bengals 0 ====
Cincinnati Bengals vs. Baltimore Colts – Game summary

Quarter	1	2	3	4	Total
Bengals	0	0	0	0	0
Colts	7	3	0	7	17

at Memorial Stadium, Baltimore, Maryland

- Game time: 1:00 p.m. EST
- Game attendance: 51,127
- Referee: Jack Vest
- TV announcers (NBC): Jim Simpson and Al DeRogatis

Game information

First quarter

- BAL – Roy Jefferson 45-yard pass from Johnny Unitas (Jim O'Brien kick). Colts 7–0.

Second quarter

- BAL – Jim O'Brien 44-yard field goal. Colts 10–0.

Third quarter

- No scoring plays.

Fourth quarter

- BAL – Eddie Hinton 53-yard pass from Johnny Unitas (Jim O'Brien kick). Colts 17–0.

Top passers

- CIN – Virgil Carter – 7/20, 64 yards, INT
- BAL – Johnny Unitas – 6/17, 145 yards, 2 TD

Top rushers

- CIN – Paul Robinson – 5 rushes, 25 yards
- BAL – Norm Bulaich – 25 rushes, 116 yards

Top receivers

- CIN – Chip Myers – 4 receptions, 66 yards
- BAL – Eddie Hinton – 3 receptions, 86 yards, TD

The Bengals started out their first season as an NFL team 1–6, but stormed into the playoffs by winning their last seven games. However, their comeback season came to a crushing halt in Baltimore, where the Colts' defense limited the Bengals to eight first downs and 139 total yards of offense. By the end of the first three quarters, the Bengals had just 47 yards and two first downs.

The closest Cincinnati came to scoring was Horst Muhlmann's 49-yard field goal attempt which was blocked by Colts linebacker Ray May. Meanwhile, Baltimore quarterback Johnny Unitas threw two touchdown passes: a 45-yard completion to Roy Jefferson in the first quarter and a 53-yard reception to Eddie Hinton in the fourth period. Jim O'Brien added a 44-yard field goal in the second quarter. Rookie running back Norm Bulaich rushed for 116 yards.

This was the first postseason meeting between the Bengals and Colts. The crowd of 51,127 ended the Colts' streak of 51 consecutive sellouts which began in 1958. The gametime temperature of 30 °F with a wind chill of 0 °F and winds up to 30 miles per hour was a factor.

==== NFC: Dallas Cowboys 5, Detroit Lions 0 ====
Detroit Lions vs. Dallas Cowboys – Game summary

Quarter	1	2	3	4	Total
Lions	0	0	0	0	0
Cowboys	3	0	0	2	5

at Cotton Bowl, Dallas, Texas

- Game time: 4:00 p.m. EST
- Game attendance: 69,613
- Referee: Jim Tunney
- TV announcers (CBS): Frank Glieber and Frank Gifford
- Pro-Football-Reference.com

Game information

First quarter

- DAL – Mike Clark 26-yard field goal. Cowboys 3–0.

Second quarter

- No scoring plays.

Third quarter

- No scoring plays.

Fourth quarter

- DAL – Safety, Greg Landry tackled in end zone by George Andrie and Jethro Pugh. Cowboys 5–0.

Top passers

- DET – Greg Landry – 5/12, 48 yards
- DAL – Craig Morton – 4/18, 38 yards, INT

Top rushers

- DET – Mel Farr – 12 rushes, 31 yards
- DAL – Duane Thomas – 30 rushes, 135 yards

Top receivers

- DET – Larry Walton – 3 receptions, 39 yards
- DAL – Bob Hayes – 1 reception, 20 yards

Although they recorded 209 rushing yards, the Cowboys could only manage a field goal and a safety but still managed to shut out the Lions. The Cowboy defense held Lions quarterback Greg Landry to 48 passing yards. In addition, they contained his running as Landry was an excellent running QB; he averaged 10 yards per carry and gained 350 yards during the regular season. However, in this game he was held to 15 yards rushing.

In the first quarter, Cowboys rookie safety Charlie Waters recovered a fumble from Landry and returned it nine yards to his own 45. A 14-yard completion from Craig Morton to fullback Walt Garrison and a pair of six-yard runs by Duane Thomas then got the team close enough for Mike Clark's 26-yard field goal to give the Cowboys a 3–0 lead. In the second quarter, Detroit managed to advance the ball to the Dallas 29, but a jarring tackle by defensive end Larry Cole stripped the ball from RB Altie Taylor and Waters recorded his second fumble recovery to keep Detroit scoreless. The Lions would not move the ball into Dallas territory again until 59 seconds remained in the game.

In the final period, Dallas marched 76 yards in 15 plays, 51 of those yards from Thomas, to advance to the Detroit one-yard line. Rather than kick a field goal on fourth down, the Cowboys elected to give the ball to Thomas, who was stopped short of the goal line. But three plays later, Dallas defensive end George Andrie and Jethro Pugh sacked Landry for a safety. Bill Munson replaced Landry and led the Lions down field in the waning moments, including a 39-yard completion to Earl McCullouch on the Dallas 29 that converted a fourth down, but the Cowboys clinched the victory in the final moments with Mel Renfro's interception at their own 11-yard line.

The contest remains the lowest-scoring postseason game in NFL history and was just the second time in league history a game ended with a 5–0 score. It was the first playoff game without a touchdown in twenty years.

This was the first postseason meeting between the Lions and Cowboys.

=== Sunday, December 27, 1970 ===
==== NFC: San Francisco 49ers 17, Minnesota Vikings 14 ====
San Francisco 49ers vs. Minnesota Vikings – Game summary

Quarter	1	2	3	4	Total
49ers	7	3	0	7	17
Vikings	7	0	0	7	14

at Metropolitan Stadium, Bloomington, Minnesota

- Game time: 1:00 p.m. EST
- Game attendance: 45,103
- Referee: Pat Haggerty
- TV announcers (CBS): Ray Scott and Pat Summerall

Game information

First quarter

- MIN – Paul Krause 22-yard fumble return (Fred Cox kick). Vikings 7–0.
- SF – Dick Witcher 24-yard pass from John Brodie (Bruce Gossett kick). Tied 7–7.

Second quarter

- SF – Bruce Gossett 40-yard field goal. 49ers 10–7.

Third quarter

- No scoring plays.

Fourth quarter

- SF – John Brodie 1-yard run (Bruce Gossett kick). 49ers 17–7.
- MIN – Gene Washington 24-yard pass from Gary Cuozzo (Fred Cox kick). 49ers 17–14.

Top passers

- SF – John Brodie – 16/32, 201 yards, TD
- MIN – Gary Cuozzo – 9/27, 146 yards, TD, 2 INT

Top rushers

- SF – Ken Willard – 27 rushes, 85 yards
- MIN – Clint Jones – 15 rushes, 60 yards

Top receivers

- SF – Bill Tucker – 6 receptions, 48 yards
- MIN – John Henderson – 5 receptions, 80 yards

The 10–3–1 49ers, making their first playoff game since 1957, stunned the heavily favored Vikings, the defending NFL champions who had finished the regular season with an NFL best record at 12–2. The 49ers defeated the Vikings in Minnesota, despite losing three of five fumbles; Minnesota had four turnovers. The loss ended a 16-game home winning streak at Metropolitan Stadium for the Vikings, including postseason.

Quarterback John Brodie led the 49ers to their first NFL playoff victory by throwing for 201 yards and touchdown and rushing for another. The Vikings scored first when Minnesota defensive back Paul Krause picked up San Francisco running back Ken Willard's fumble in midair and returned it 22 yards for a touchdown. The 49ers responded by scoring 17 unanswered points, first with Brodie's 24-yard touchdown pass to Dick Witcher. Then in the second quarter, San Francisco converted a Vikings fumble into Bruce Gossett's 40-yard field goal. Brodie scored the clinching touchdown, a one-yard run, with 1:20 left. Minnesota's 24-yard touchdown pass was completed with only seven seconds left in the game, and ended with just one second remaining on the clock.

This was the first postseason meeting between the 49ers and Vikings.

==== AFC: Oakland Raiders 21, Miami Dolphins 14 ====
Miami Dolphins vs. Oakland Raiders – Game summary

Quarter	1	2	3	4	Total
Dolphins	0	7	0	7	14
Raiders	0	7	7	7	21

at Oakland Coliseum, Oakland, California

- Game time: 4:00 p.m. EST
- Game attendance: 52,594
- Referee: John McDonough
- TV announcers (NBC): Curt Gowdy and Kyle Rote

Game information

First quarter

- No scoring plays.

Second quarter

- MIA – Paul Warfield 16-yard pass from Bob Griese (Garo Yepremian kick). Dolphins 7–0.
- OAK – Fred Biletnikoff 22-yard pass from Daryle Lamonica (George Blanda kick). Tied 7–7.

Third quarter

- OAK – Willie Brown 50-yard interception return (George Blanda kick). Raiders 14–7.

Fourth quarter

- OAK – Rod Sherman 82-yard pass from Daryle Lamonica (George Blanda kick). Raiders 21–7.
- MIA – Willie Richardson 7-yard pass from Bob Griese (Garo Yepremian kick). Raiders 21–14.

Top passers

- MIA – Bob Griese – 13/27, 155 yards, 2 TD, INT
- OAK – Daryle Lamonica – 8/16, 187 yards, 2 TD

Top rushers

- MIA – Jim Kiick – 14 rushes, 64 yards
- OAK – Marv Hubbard – 18 rushes, 58 yards

Top receivers

- MIA – Paul Warfield – 4 receptions, 62 yards, TD
- OAK – Rod Sherman – 1 reception, 82 yards, TD

Quarterback Daryle Lamonica threw two touchdown passes and the Raiders scored 14-points in the second half to defeat the Dolphins 21–14 in a sea of mud at the Oakland Coliseum.

In the first quarter, both teams blew scoring chances on drives deep into opposing territory, with Raiders kicker George Blanda driving a 23-yard field goal attempt wide right and Miami's Garo Yepremian missing a kick from 24 yards. In the second quarter, Dolphins defensive end Bill Stanfill recovered a fumble from Charlie Smith on the Raiders 19 that set up Bob Griese's 16-yard touchdown pass to Paul Warfield. With less than five minutes left in the half, Raiders quarterback Daryle Lamonica led the team on a 62-yard scoring drive to tie the game 7–7, completing a 21-yard pass to tight end Raymond Chester and an 11-yarder to Fred Biletnikoff before connecting with Biletnikoff in the end zone from 22 yards out.

Oakland took the second half kickoff and drove all the way to the Dolphins' two-yard line, but Smith lost another fumble, this one recovered by defensive back Jake Scott, and the Raiders were unable to break the tie. On the first play after the turnover, Miami quarterback Bob Griese hooked up with Paul Warfield for 24-yard gain. But later in the drive, he was sacked for a 12-yard loss. Faced with third down and 19, Griese had to go deep to attempt a first down completion. He attempted to throw to Warfield, only to see his pass intercepted by Willie Brown and returned 50 yards for a touchdown, giving the Raiders a 14–7 lead.

Early in the fourth quarter, Miami drove into scoring range, but came up empty when Yepremian missed another field goal attempt from 24 yards. Two plays later, on third down and 12, Lamonica fired a pass to Rod Sherman, who took off for an 82-yard touchdown completion to put the Raiders up 21–7. Miami responded by picking up five first downs on a 69-yard drive that ended with Griese's seven-yard touchdown pass to Willie Richardson. Then with 2:22 left, they managed for force a punt, giving them one last chance to drive for a tying touchdown. However, the Raiders forced a turnover on downs, then ran out the clock.

Lamonica finished the game 8/16 for 187 yards and two touchdowns, with no interceptions.

This was the first postseason meeting between the Dolphins and Raiders.

== Conference championships ==
=== Sunday, January 3, 1971 ===
==== AFC: Baltimore Colts 27, Oakland Raiders 17 ====
Oakland Raiders vs. Baltimore Colts – Game summary

Quarter	1	2	3	4	Total
Raiders	0	3	7	7	17
Colts	3	7	10	7	27

at Memorial Stadium, Baltimore, Maryland

- Game time: 2:00 p.m. EST
- Game attendance: 54,799
- Referee: Ben Dreith
- TV announcers (NBC): Curt Gowdy and Kyle Rote

Game information

First quarter

- BAL – Jim O'Brien 16-yard field goal. Colts 3–0.

Second quarter

- BAL – Norm Bulaich 2-yard run (Jim O'Brien kick). Colts 10–0.
- OAK – George Blanda 48-yard field goal. Colts 10–3.

Third quarter

- OAK – Fred Biletnikoff 38-yard pass from George Blanda (George Blanda kick). Tied 10–10.
- BAL – Jim O'Brien 23-yard field goal. Colts 13–10.
- BAL – Norm Bulaich 11-yard run (Jim O'Brien kick). Colts 20–10.

Fourth quarter

- OAK – Warren Wells 15-yard pass from George Blanda (George Blanda kick). Colts 20–17.
- BAL – Ray Perkins 68-yard pass from Johnny Unitas (Jim O'Brien kick). Colts 27–17.

Top passers

- OAK – George Blanda – 17/32, 271 yards, 2 TD, 3 INT
- BAL – Johnny Unitas – 11/30, 245 yards, TD

Top rushers

- OAK – Hewritt Dixon – 10 rushes, 51 yards
- BAL – Norm Bulaich – 22 rushes, 71 yards, 2 TD

Top receivers

- OAK – Warren Wells – 5 receptions, 108 yards, TD
- BAL – Eddie Hinton – 5 receptions, 115 yards

Colts quarterback Johnny Unitas's 68-yard touchdown pass to Ray Perkins in the fourth quarter gave the Colts a two-score lead that the Raiders could not overcome, sending his team to their second Super Bowl in the last three years.

Baltimore dominated the first quarter, holding the Raiders to six plays and one completion, while Unitas led them to the four-yard line, where Jim O'Brien's 16-yard field goal gave them a 3–0 lead.

In the second quarter, a massive hit by Colts defensive tackle Bubba Smith knocked Oakland QB Daryle Lamonica out of the game, and he was replaced by George Blanda. Later on, Willie Brown narrowly dropped an interception on a deep pass from Unitas. At the time this did not seem to matter much, as the incomplete pass was on third down and the Colts had to punt. But returner George Atkinson fumbled David Lee's kick and the Colts' running back Sam Havrilak recovered with excellent field position. Unitas then completed a 43-yard pass to Eddie Hinton at the two-yard line, and Norm Bulaich scored a touchdown run on the next play, increasing the lead to 10–0. Blanda then led the Raiders back, and with the aid of a roughing the punter penalty, he got them close enough for a 48-yard field goal, which he kicked himself to cut the score 10–3 at the end of the half.

Oakland tied the score early in the third quarter with Blanda's 38-yard touchdown pass to Fred Biletnikoff. Unitas responded with two key long completions to Hinton that set up O'Brien's 23-yard field goal to retake the lead at 13–10. Later in the quarter, Bulaich scored on an 11-yard touchdown run, giving the Colts a 20–10 lead going into the fourth quarter.

Now down by two scores with just one quarter left, Blanda got the Raiders rolling on a long touchdown drive. Running back Charlie Smith picked up 20 yards on a draw play (the longest run of the game for either team). Then Blanda fooled the Colts' defense with a fake handoff before firing a pass to Warren Wells for a 37-yard gain to the Colts 11. Blanda eventually finished the drive with a 15-yard touchdown pass to Wells on third down, making the score 20–17. The momentum seemed to be swinging back in their favor when they forced the Colts into a third and 11 situation on their own 32-yard line on the next drive. On the next play, Unitas threw a deep pass to a wide open Perkins, who raced down the left sideline for a 68-yard touchdown completion that gave the Colts a 27–17 lead. This would prove to be the last score of the game as the Raiders were shut out in the final 12 minutes, with Blanda throwing two interceptions deep in Baltimore territory.

Blanda finished the game completing 17 of 32 passes for 271 yards with two touchdowns and three interceptions. At 43 years old, he was the oldest quarterback ever to play in a championship game. His top target was Wells, who caught five passes for 108 yards and a touchdown. Unitas completed 11 of 30 passes for 245 yards and a touchdown. The Colts leading receiver was Hinton, who caught eight passes for 115 yards. Bubba Smith and Ray Hilton each had two sacks, along with Raiders defensive end Ben Davidson.

This would turn out to be the final home playoff win for the Colts in Baltimore before they moved to Indianapolis in 1984.

This was the first postseason meeting between the Raiders and Colts.

This would be the only time Baltimore hosted an AFC Championship game until the 2023 season.

==== NFC: Dallas Cowboys 17, San Francisco 49ers 10 ====
Dallas Cowboys vs. San Francisco 49ers – Game summary

Quarter	1	2	3	4	Total
Cowboys	0	3	14	0	17
49ers	3	0	7	0	10

at Kezar Stadium, San Francisco

- Game time: 5:00 p.m. EST
- Game weather: 48 °F (9 °C), sunny
- Game attendance: 59,364
- Referee: Tommy Bell
- TV announcers (CBS): Ray Scott and Pat Summerall
- Box score

Game information

First quarter

- SF – Bruce Gossett 16-yard field goal. 49ers 3–0.

Second quarter

- DAL – Mike Clark 21-yard field goal. Tied 3–3.

Third quarter

- DAL – Duane Thomas 13-yard run (Mike Clark kick). Cowboys 10–3.
- DAL – Walt Garrison 5-yard pass from Craig Morton (Mike Clark kick). Cowboys 17–3.
- SF – Dick Witcher 26-yard pass from John Brodie (Bruce Gossett kick). Cowboys 17–10.

Fourth quarter

- No scoring plays.

Top passers

- DAL – Craig Morton – 7/22, 101 yards, TD
- SF – John Brodie – 19/40, 262 yards, TD, 2 INT

Top rushers

- DAL – Duane Thomas – 27 rushes, 143 yards, TD
- SF – Ken Willard – 13 rushes, 42 yards

Top receivers

- DAL – Walt Garrison – 3 receptions, 51 yards, TD
- SF – Gene Washington – 6 receptions, 88 yards

Although Dallas quarterback Craig Morton only completed 7 out of 22 passes for 101 yards, rookie halfback Duane Thomas rushed for 143 yards and caught two passes for 24 as Dallas converted two third quarter interceptions into 14 points to defeat the 49ers.

On the second drive of the game, 49ers quarterback John Brodie's 42-yard completion to Gene Washington at the Cowboys nine-yard line set up Bruce Gossett's 16-yard field goal to give the team a 3–0 lead, but only after Brodie misfired on a pass to fullback Ken Willard, who was open in the end zone. This would be the only score of the half for San Francisco. Dallas fared little better, with Mike Clark missing a field goal from 40 yards out, and later kicking a 21-yard field goal to tie the game, 3–3.

After each team punted once in the second half, San Francisco had the ball on their own 21-yard line. On the first play, Brodie was sacked by linebacker Dave Edwards for a seven-yard loss. Then on second down, Lee Roy Jordan intercepted Brodie's pass and returned it four yards to the 13, where Thomas scored a touchdown run for Dallas on the next play, breaking three tackles en route to the end zone. On San Francisco's next series, Mel Renfro picked off a pass from Brodie and returned it 19 yards to the Cowboys' 38-yard line, setting off a 62-yard scoring drive for his team. The key player on the drive was fullback Walt Garrison, who had a 12-yard carry, gained 24 yards on a screen pass, and finished it off with a five-yard touchdown catch from Morton to give the Cowboys a 17–3 lead.

San Francisco responded with an eight-play, 72-yard drive to score on Brodie's 26-yard touchdown pass to tight end Dick Witcher and cut the score to 17–10 going into the fourth quarter, but they were shut out for the rest of the game. They nearly got a big scoring chance when Thomas fumbled the ball, but receiver Reggie Rucker recovered it, allowing Dallas to keep possession and take a lot of time off the clock with a drive to the 49ers 17-yard line. Clark missed a field goal attempt from there, giving San Francisco a chance to drive for the tying touchdown, but the farthest they could make it was to the Dallas 39, and after Renfro broke up a third down pass, Gossett missed a field goal from 47 yards out, and 49ers would not threaten to score again.

This was the 49ers' first playoff game at home since 1957 and their last home game at Kezar Stadium. Johnny Mathis sang the national anthem, and Tony Bennett performed his signature song "I Left My Heart in San Francisco" at halftime.

This was the first postseason meeting between the Cowboys and 49ers.

== Super Bowl V: Baltimore Colts 16, Dallas Cowboys 13 ==
Super Bowl V – Baltimore Colts vs. Dallas Cowboys – Game summary

Quarter	1	2	3	4	Total
Colts (AFC)	0	6	0	10	16
Cowboys (NFC)	3	10	0	0	13

at Orange Bowl, Miami, Florida

- Date: January 17, 1971
- Game attendance: 79,204
- Referee: Norm Schachter
- TV announcers (NBC): Curt Gowdy and Kyle Rote

This is the only Super Bowl meeting between the Colts and Cowboys.
