= 1969–70 NFL playoffs =

American football tournament

1969 NFL playoffs
- Dates: December 27, 1969–January 4, 1970
- Season: 1969
- Teams: 4
- Games played: 3
- NFL Championship Game site: Metropolitan Stadium; Bloomington, Minnesota
- Defending champions: Baltimore Colts (did not qualify)
- Champion: Minnesota Vikings
- Runner-up: Cleveland Browns
NFL playoffs
← 1968	1970–71 →

The NFL playoffs following the 1969 NFL season determined the league's representative in Super Bowl IV.

This was the last NFL playoff tournament before the AFL–NFL merger and the last awarding of the Ed Thorp Memorial Trophy to the NFL champion, which was introduced in 1934.

== Tournament bracket ==
The four-team postseason format was introduced for the 1967 season, when the NFL expanded to 16 teams and realigned into four divisions with four teams each.

Within each conference, the two division winners qualified for the playoffs. In the Eastern Conference first round, the Capitol winner met the Century winner, while the Coastal and Central played for the Western Conference title. The winners of the two conference games advanced to the NFL Championship Game to play for the NFL league title and the right to face the American Football League champion in Super Bowl IV. The losers of the conference championship games played in the Playoff Bowl, a third place game at the Orange Bowl in Miami.

The 1970 Playoff Bowl was its 10th and final edition.

Prior to 1975, the playoff sites rotated and were known prior to the start of the season. In 1969, the hosts were the Capitol and Central division winners for the conference championships (first round), and the Western Conference for the championship game. This gave home field advantage to the Central Division winner, the Minnesota Vikings (12–2), which had the league's best record. The previous year's playoff hosts were Century, Coastal, and Eastern, respectively, and 1967 was like 1969. All three playoff games in 1969 were hosted by the team with the better regular season record.

The defending NFL champion Baltimore Colts finished at 8–5–1, runner-up in the Coastal Division, and missed the postseason; they returned to the playoffs the following season, winning the first AFC Championship and Super Bowl V.

Conference championship
December 28, 1969 – Cotton Bowl
Cleveland	38
Dallas	14
December 27, 1969 – Metropolitan Stadium
Los Angeles	20
Minnesota	23

NFL Championship
January 4, 1970 – Metropolitan Stadium
Cleveland	7
Minnesota	27
Playoff Bowl
January 3, 1970 - Orange Bowl
Dallas	0
Los Angeles	31

== Conference championships ==
=== Saturday, December 27, 1969 ===
==== Western Conference: Minnesota Vikings 23, Los Angeles Rams 20 ====
Minnesota Vikings 23, Los Angeles Rams 20

Quarter	1	2	3	4	Total
Rams	7	10	0	3	20
Vikings	7	0	7	9	23

at Metropolitan Stadium, Bloomington, Minnesota

- Date: December 27, 1969
- Game time: 1:00 p.m. CST
- Game weather: 11 °F (−12 °C)
- Game attendance: 47,900
- Referee: Pat Haggerty
- TV: CBS
- Pro-Football-Reference.com

Game information

Scoring

- First quarter
  - LA – Bob Klein 3-yard pass from Roman Gabriel (Gossett kick). Rams 7–0.
  - MIN – Dave Osborn 1-yard run (Cox kick). Tied 7–7.
- Second quarter
  - LA – Bruce Gossett 20-yard field goal. Rams 10–7.
  - LA – Billy Truax 2-yard pass from Roman Gabriel (Gossett kick). Rams 17–7.
- Third quarter
  - MIN – Dave Osborn 1-yard run (Cox kick). Rams 17–14.
- Fourth quarter
  - LA – Bruce Gossett 27-yard field goal. Rams 20–14.
  - MIN – Joe Kapp 2-yard run (Cox kick). Vikings 21–20.
  - MIN – Safety, Gabriel tackled in endzone by Carl Eller. Vikings 23–20.

Top passers

- LA – Roman Gabriel – 22/32, 150 yards, 2 TD, 1 INT
- MIN – Joe Kapp – 12/19, 196 yards, 2 INT

Top rushers

- LA – Larry Smith – 11 rushes, 60 yards
- MIN – Joe Kapp – 7 carries, 42 yards, 1 TD

Top receivers

- LA – Billy Truax – 5 receptions, 47 yards, 1 TD
- MIN – Gene Washington – 4 receptions, 90 yards

Three weeks prior to this game, the teams met in Los Angeles in a battle between the undefeated (11–0) Rams and the 10–1 Vikings. The Vikings won that game 20–13. The rematch was played in the cold and snow of Minnesota. Despite committing more turnovers (3 to 1) and only gaining 20 more total yards (275–255), the Vikings managed to edge out the Rams for their first postseason win in franchise history.

In Los Angeles, with the Viking defense intent on shutting down the Rams' wide receivers and outside running game, the Rams attacked the middle of the Viking defense and neutralized the Viking pass rush with short quick passes to the tight ends. The Rams defense held Minnesota's high-powered offense in check, with the "Fearsome Foursome" defensive line harassing Viking quarterback Joe Kapp. Early on, the momentum seemed to be in favor of the Rams. Rams safety Richie Petitbon recovered a fumble from fullback Bill Brown that gave his team a first down on the Minnesota 45-yard line. On the next play, it appeared that the Vikings took a quick lead as Carl Eller intercepted a Roman Gabriel pass and returned for a touchdown but the score was nullified on an offside penalty on Alan Page. Taking advantage of their second chance, running back Larry Smith gained 19 yards on three carries, and Gabriel eventually finished the drive with a 3-yard touchdown pass to tight end Bob Klein. The Vikings quickly stormed back, with Kapp completing four consecutive passes on a 10-play, 75-yard drive, with three of the completions going to Gene Washington for 49 total yards, including a 27-yard reception that gave the Vikings the ball on the Rams' 4-yard line. Dave Osborn ran for a touchdown on the next play, tying the score at 7 with just over three minutes left in the first quarter. The Rams moved the ball effectively on their next drive, but it ended on a missed 38-yard field goal attempt by Bruce Gossett. Their next drive took up the majority of the second quarter, with a key 13-yard run by Gabriel to convert a third down. Gossett finished the drive with a 20-yard field goal to put the Rams up 10–7 with 4:30 left before halftime. Following a punt, Gabriel led his team back for more points. This time he completed passes to tight end Billy Truax for gains of 18 and 16 yards before finishing the 13-play, 65-yard drive with a 2-yard touchdown pass to Truax. The Rams went into halftime leading 17–7, having scored on three of their four first half possessions.

In the second half, Viking coach Bud Grant adjusted his defense to stop the Ram tight ends, and his "Purple People Eaters" continued to punish the Ram running game. They also got increasing pressure on Gabriel. On offense, Grant neutralized the Ram pass rush by having Kapp run the ball, either on designed plays like quarterback draws or roll outs, or by instructing him to take off and run at the first sign of pressure. Kapp began frustrating the Rams with runs; this threat caused their pass rush to be less aggressive. After forcing the Rams to punt for the first time in the game on the opening possession of the second half, Kapp completed a 41-yard pass to Washington on the Rams 12-yard line. After a Rams penalty and a 5-yard run by Kapp, Osborn finished the drive with a 1-yard touchdown run that cut Minnesota's deficit to 17–14. However, Minnesota's comeback attempt suffered major setbacks over the next few drives against a punishing effort from the Rams defense. The next time the Vikings got the ball, they drove deep into Rams territory, only to have Kapp throw an interception to safety Ed Meador on the Rams 4-yard line. Meador fumbled the ball during the return, but linebacker Jim Purnell recovered it. After a Rams punt, Kapp was intercepted again, this time by Petitbon, who returned the ball four yards to the Vikings' 36. Once again, the Viking stopped the Rams inside the 10-yard line that made them settle for a 27-yard Gossett field goal, which gave the Rams a precarious six-point lead.

Kapp subsequently marched the Vikings 65 yards downfield, completing three passes for 40 yards and going the final two yards himself as Minnesota took its first lead of the game with the subsequent extra point to make the score 21–20, with 8:24 on the clock. After their special teams unit tackled returner Ron Smith on the 12-yard line during the ensuing kickoff, Carl Eller sacked Gabriel in the end zone for a safety, giving the Vikings a 23–20 lead. The Vikings received the ball but could not run out the clock, with the Ram defense forcing a punt and giving Los Angeles one chance to score. Gabriel marched down the field in the final minutes, even crossing midfield, but a Gabriel pass was tipped and intercepted at the Viking 40-yard line by Alan Page with thirty seconds remaining to seal the game.

Gabriel completed 22-of-30 passes for 150 yards and two touchdowns, with one interception, while also rushing for 26 yards. Larry Smith was the top rusher of the game with 11 carries for 60 yards, and he caught 6 passes for 36 yards. Kapp completed 12-of-19 passes for 196 yards with two interceptions, while also rushing for 41 yards and a touchdown. Washington caught 4 passes for 90 yards.

=== Sunday, December 28, 1969 ===
==== Eastern Conference: Cleveland Browns 38, Dallas Cowboys 14 ====
Cleveland Browns 38, Dallas Cowboys 14

Quarter	1	2	3	4	Total
Browns	7	10	7	14	38
Cowboys	0	0	7	7	14

at Cotton Bowl, Dallas, Texas

- Date: December 28, 1969
- Game time: 1:30 p.m. CST
- Game attendance: 69,321
- Referee: Jim Tunney
- TV: CBS
- Pro-Football-Reference.com

Game information

Scoring

- First quarter
  - CLE – Bo Scott 2-yard run (Cockroft kick). Browns 7–0.
- Second quarter
  - CLE – Milt Morin 6 pass from Nelsen (Cockroft kick). Browns 14–0.
  - CLE – Don Cockroft 29-yard field goal. Browns 17–0.
- Third quarter
  - CLE – Bo Scott 2-yard rush (Cockroft kick).Browns 24–0.
  - DAL – Craig Morton 2-yard run (Mike Clark kick). Browns 24–7.
- Fourth quarter
  - CLE – Leroy Kelly 1-yard rush (Cockroft kick). Browns 31–7.
  - CLE – Walt Sumner 89-yard interception return (Cockroft kick). Browns 38–7.
  - DAL – Lance Rentzel 5-yard pass from Roger Staubach (Clark kick). Browns 38–14.

Top passers

- CLE – Bill Nelsen – 18/27, 219 yards, 1 TD
- DAL – Craig Morton – 8/24, 92 yards, 2 INT

Top rushers

- CLE – Leroy Kelly – 19 rushes, 66 yards, 1 TD
- DAL – Walt Garrison – 9 rushes, 49 yards

Top receivers

- CLE – Paul Warfield – 8 receptions, 99 yards
- DAL – Bob Hayes – 4 receptions, 44 yards

For the second year in a row, Cleveland eliminated Dallas from the playoffs, this time outgaining them in total yards 344 to 217 and forcing three turnovers, without losing any themselves.

Unlike the previous year's game which was a defensive struggle until the Browns put the game away in the fourth quarter, Cleveland dominated the first half, holding Dallas to just 17 plays and 39 total yards. They had to punt after taking the opening kickoff, but Don Cockroft's high short kick ended up bouncing off the leg of Dallas lineman Rayfield Wright and linebacker Bob Matheson recovered for the Browns on the Cowboys' 34-yard line. Cleveland then drove to their first score on a 2-yard touchdown run by Bo Scott. The Browns later increased their lead to 14–0 by driving 55 yards to score on Bill Nelsen's 6-yard touchdown pass to tight end Milt Morin. Cockroft missed two field goal attempts, but just before the end of the half, Ron Widby's 27-yard punt gave the Browns the ball on the Cowboys' 34-yard line, setting up Cockroft's 29-yard field goal that gave Cleveland a 17–0 halftime lead.

Early in the third quarter, Browns linebacker Jim Houston intercepted Craig Morton's pass and returned it 35 yards to the Dallas 19, leading to Scott's second 2-yard touchdown run to make the score 24–0. This time Dallas was able to respond, driving 72 yards in 12 plays, including a 26-yard catch by tight end Pettis Norman, to score on Morton's 2-yard touchdown run.

However, 24–7 was as close as the Cowboys would get. In the 4th quarter, a 39-yard burst by Browns running back Leroy Kelly (the longest gain of the day for either team) set up his 1-yard touchdown plunge to give the Browns a 31–7 lead. Dallas had a chance to score after a punt play when Cockroft bobbled a low snap from rookie center Chuck Reynolds and was tackled on the Browns' 22-yard line. But faced with 4th down from the 18 after 7 plays, Morton threw a short pass intended for Walt Garrison that was intercepted by rookie cornerback Walt Sumner, who took off for an 88-yard touchdown return.

The only notable thing remaining in the game would be the playoff debut of 27-year-old rookie Dallas quarterback Roger Staubach. He got off to a shaky start, throwing an interception that was eliminated by a Browns holding penalty, but managed to lead the Cowboys to a touchdown, rushing three times for 22 yards and completing passes to Lance Rentzel for gains of 14 and 22 yards before finding him in the end zone for a 5-yard scoring pass.

Nelsen completed 18/27 passes for 219 yards and a touchdown. His top receiver was Paul Warfield, who caught 8 passes for 99 yards. Tight end Milt Morin caught 4 passes for 52 yards and a touchdown. Kelly had 66 rushing yards on 19 carries, 10 receiving yards, and a touchdown. Scott ran 11 times for 33 yards and 2 touchdowns and had 2 receptions for 39 yards. Morton was held to just 8/24 completions for 92 yards, with two interceptions that were both converted into Cleveland touchdowns. Playing in relief, Staubach completed 4/5 passes for 44 yards and a touchdown while also rushing 3 times for 22 yards.

== NFL Championship Game: Minnesota Vikings 27, Cleveland Browns 7 ==
Minnesota Vikings 27, Cleveland Browns 7

Quarter	1	2	3	4	Total
Browns	0	0	0	7	7
Vikings	14	10	3	0	27

at Metropolitan Stadium, Bloomington, Minnesota

- Date: January 4, 1970
- Game time: 12:00 p.m. CST
- Game weather: 8 °F (−13 °C), wind 9 mph (14 km/h), wind chill −6 °F (−21 °C), relative humidity 75%
- Game attendance: 46,503
- Referee: Tommy Bell
- TV: CBS
- Pro-Football-Reference.com

Game information

First quarter

- MIN – Joe Kapp 7-yard run (Fred Cox kick). Vikings 7–0.
- MIN – Gene Washington 75-yard pass from Joe Kapp (Fred Cox kick). Vikings 14–0.

Second quarter

- MIN – Fred Cox 30-yard field goal. Vikings 17–0.
- MIN – Dave Osborn 20-yard run (Fred Cox kick). Vikings 24–0.

Third quarter

- MIN – Fred Cox 32-yard field goal. Vikings 27–0.

Fourth quarter

- CLE – Gary Collins 3-yard pass from Bill Nelsen (Don Cockroft kick). Vikings 27–7.

Top passers

- CLE – Bill Nelsen – 17/33, 181 yards, TD, 2 INT
- MIN – Joe Kapp – 7/13, 169 yards, TD

Top rushers

- CLE – Leroy Kelly – 15 rushes, 80 yards
- MIN – Dave Osborn – 18 rushes, 108 yards, TD

Top receivers

- CLE – Bo Scott – 5 receptions, 56 yards
- MIN – Gene Washington – 3 receptions, 120 yards, TD

Cleveland had lost the previous season's NFL title game 34–0, and this time fared little better. The Vikings dominated the game, racking up 381 yards without losing a single turnover, while Cleveland gained just 268 yards and turned the ball over three times.

The Vikings took a lead just four minutes into the first quarter, driving 70 yards for a touchdown in 8 plays. The key play of the drive was a pass from Joe Kapp to receiver Gene Washington that was nearly 5 yards short of the mark. Despite the short throw, Washington was able to come back and haul it in for a 33-yard gain to the Browns' 24-yard line. Two plays later, Dave Osborn's 12-yard run moved the ball to the 7. Then two plays after that, Bill Brown accidentally slipped and bumped into Kapp while moving up to take a handoff, but Kapp simply kept the ball himself and ran it 7 yards for a touchdown.

The situation never got any better for Cleveland. The next time Minnesota got the ball, Erich Barnes slipped while in one-on-one coverage with Washington, enabling him to catch a pass from Kapp and take off for a 75-yard touchdown completion. Near the end of the first quarter, Browns running back Leroy Kelly lost a fumble that was recovered by linebacker Wally Hilgenberg on the Cleveland 43. Kapp then completed a 12-yard pass to Washington before Fred Cox finished the drive with a 30-yard field goal, putting the Vikings up 17–0. Later in the second period, Hilgenberg snuffed out a Cleveland scoring threat by intercepting a pass from Bill Nelsen on the Vikings' 33-yard line. Minnesota subsequently drove 67 yards in 8 plays. Kapp started the drive with a pair of completions to John Henderson for 17 total yards, while Osborn broke off a 16-yard run and ended up finishing the drive with a 20-yard touchdown burst, giving the Vikings a 24–0 lead with 4:46 left in the first half. Cleveland responded with a drive to the Vikings' 17, but turned the ball over on downs when Nelsen overthrew receiver Gary Collins in the end zone on 4th and 3.

The third quarter was mostly uneventful, other than Cox's 32-yard field goal that gave Minnesota a 27–0 lead after an 11-play, 80-yard drive. The most noteworthy play was a 13-yard scramble by Kapp in which he plowed into 240-pound Browns linebacker Jim Houston so hard that Houston was knocked out of the game. In the 4th quarter, Cleveland finally got on the board when a diving 18-yard reception by Paul Warfield set up Nelsen's 3-yard touchdown pass to Collins. There were still 13 minutes on the clock at this point, but there would be no more scoring. The Vikings had a drive to the Cleveland 2-yard line, but decided to let the clock run out instead of going for another score.

Kapp completed just 7/13 passes, but threw for 169 yards and a touchdown, while also rushing for 57 yards and another score. Osborn rushed 18 times for 108 yards and a touchdown. Washington had 120 yards and a touchdown on just 3 receptions. Kelly was the Browns' top rusher with 80 yards, while also catching two passes for 17. Nelsen completed just 17 of 33 passes for 181 yards, with one touchdown and two interceptions.
