= Dave Osborn =

American football player (born 1943)

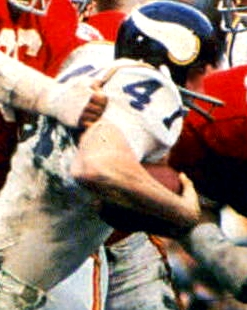
- Osborn playing for the Vikings in Super Bowl IV

No. 41
- Position: Running back

Personal information
- Born: March 18, 1943 (age 83); Everett, Washington, U.S.
- Listed height: 6 ft 0 in (1.83 m)
- Listed weight: 208 lb (94 kg)

Career information
- High school: Cando (Cando, North Dakota)
- College: North Dakota
- NFL draft: 1965: 13th round, 176th overall pick

Career history
- Minnesota Vikings (1965–1975); Green Bay Packers (1976)

Awards and highlights
- NFL champion (1969); Second-team All-Pro (1967); Pro Bowl (1970); 50 Greatest Vikings; North Dakota Fighting Hawks No. 41 retired

Career NFL statistics
- Rushing yards: 4,336
- Rushing average: 3.7
- Rushing touchdowns: 29
- Receptions: 173
- Receiving yards: 1,412
- Receiving touchdowns: 7
- Stats at Pro Football Reference

David Vance Osborn (born March 18, 1943) is an American former professional football player who was a running back for 12 seasons for the Minnesota Vikings and Green Bay Packers of the National Football League (NFL). He played college football for the North Dakota Fighting Sioux, where he is the only player in program history to have his number retired.

== College career ==
Osborn played at North Dakota from 1962 to 1964 and excelled at football alongside track & field. He earned All-Conference honors. He was inducted into the university Hall of Fame in 1977.

== Pro football career ==
Osborn was drafted by the Minnesota Vikings in the 13th round of the 1965 NFL draft with the 176th overall pick. His first contract was worth $9,000.

In his rookie year of 1965, Osborn had 20 carries for 106 yards for two touchdowns, while also having one reception for four yards. He returned 18 kickoff returns for 422 yards. The next year, Osborn's carries increased significantly as he carried the ball 87 times for 344 yards and one touchdown, while having 15 receptions for 141 yards and two touchdowns. He also returned one kickoff return for 19 yards. Osborn's third year, in 1967, saw career highs in carries, receptions and rushing and receiving yardage, as he carried the ball 215 times for 972 yards while scoring two touchdowns and recorded 34 receptions for 272 yards. He played just four games in the 1968 season, while having 42 carries for 140 yards. The Vikings qualified for the playoffs that season; in the Western Conference Championship, Osborn had five carries for four yards while having one catch for -2 yards, as his team lost 24–14 to the Baltimore Colts. He returned to play in each game of the 1969 season, while having 186 carries for 643 yards and seven touchdowns (a career-high). Osborn had 22 receptions for 236 yards and one touchdown. That year, his team went on a playoff run, and he played in each of the three games that postseason. In the Divisional Round game versus the Los Angeles Rams, he had two touchdowns, one being in the first quarter that evened the score and the other in the third quarter that narrowed the deficit to 17–14. He finished with 13 carries for 30 yards in the 23–20 Viking win. In the 1969 NFL Championship Game, Osborn had a 20-yard touchdown run in the third quarter that made it 24–0, with the final score being 27–7 over the Cleveland Browns. He finished with 18 carries for 108 yards. In Super Bowl IV, Osborn was the starting halfback in the game versus the Kansas City Chiefs. In the third quarter, he scored a touchdown from four yards out to narrow the deficit to 16–7, with the final score being a 23–7 loss. Osborn had seven carries for 15 yards while having two receptions for 11 yards.

The following year, he played in all 14 games while starting in 10 of them while having 207 carries for 681 yards and five touchdowns. He also had 23 catches for 202 yards and one touchdown. He was named to the Pro Bowl that year, the lone selection of his career. In his team's playoff appearance that year, he had 12 carries for 41 yards in the team's 17–14 loss to the San Francisco 49ers. In 1971, he played in 11 games (while starting 9), carrying the ball 123 times for 349 yards and five touchdowns along with 25 receptions for 195 yards and one touchdown. In his team's playoff appearance that year, he had six carries of 13 yards in the 20–12 loss to the Dallas Cowboys. He played in every game of the 1972 season (while starting five of them), carrying the ball 82 times for 261 yards for two touchdowns and having 20 receptions for 166 yards. In the following year, he played in 11 games (while starting one), carrying the ball 48 times for 216 yards while having three catches for four yards. It was his first season with no touchdowns since 1968. In the team's playoff run that year, he played minimally, having 4 carries for 27 yards. The 1974 season (his tenth season), he played in 13 games (while starting in 10 of them), rushing 131 times for 514 yards and four touchdowns while catching the ball 29 times for 196 yards and having 1 kick return for 14 yards. In his team's playoff run that year, he played in each game as his team advanced to the Super Bowl once again. In the Division Round vs the St. Louis Cardinals, he had 16 carries for 67 yards while having 4 receptions for 36 yards as his team won 30–14. In the NFC Championship vs the Los Angeles Rams, he scored on a one-yard touchdown run to make the score 14–3 as his team held on to win 14–10. He had 20 carries for 76 yards while having a reception for one yard. In Super Bowl IX versus the Pittsburgh Steelers, he had 8 carries for −1 yards while having 2 catches for 7 yards in a 16–6 loss. The 1975 season was his last with the Vikings; he carried the ball 32 times for 94 yards and one touchdown while having one reception for −4 yards along with 1 kick return for 38 yards. He did not have any carries in the Vikings' playoff run that year, but he had one kick return for no yards as his team lost 17–14 to the Cowboys. In 1976, he joined the Green Bay Packers. He played in six games while having six carries for 16 yards while having three kick returns for 19 yards.

Osborn finished in the top 10 in rushing attempts in the league three times, doing so in 1967 (3rd with 215), 1969 (6th with 186), and 1970 (6th with 207).

== NFL career statistics ==
Legend
	Won the NFL championship
	Led the league
**Bold**	Career high

=== Regular season ===
Year	Team	Games		Rushing					Receiving				
Year	Team	GP	GS	Att	Yds	Avg	Lng	TD	Rec	Yds	Avg	Lng	TD
1965	MIN	14	0	20	106	**5.3**	21	2	1	4	4.0	4	0
1966	MIN	14	3	87	344	4.0	25	1	15	141	9.4	**38**	**2**
1967	MIN	14	14	**215**	**972**	4.5	**73**	2	**34**	**272**	8.0	29	1
1968	MIN	4	2	42	140	3.3	23	0	0	0	0.0	0	0
1969	MIN	14	14	186	643	3.5	58	**7**	22	236	**10.7**	31	1
1970	MIN	14	10	207	681	3.3	16	5	23	202	8.8	28	1
1971	MIN	11	9	123	349	2.8	15	5	25	195	7.8	25	1
1972	MIN	14	5	82	261	3.2	14	2	20	166	8.3	18	1
1973	MIN	11	1	48	216	4.5	14	0	3	4	1.3	5	0
1974	MIN	13	10	131	514	3.9	17	4	29	196	6.8	25	0
1975	MIN	14	0	32	94	2.9	9	1	1	-4	-4.0	-4	0
1976	GNB	6	0	6	16	2.7	6	0	0	0	0.0	0	0
		143	68	1,179	4,336	3.7	73	29	173	1,412	8.2	38	7

=== Playoffs ===
Year	Team	Games		Rushing					Receiving				
Year	Team	GP	GS	Att	Yds	Avg	Lng	TD	Rec	Yds	Avg	Lng	TD
1968	MIN	1	1	5	4	0.8	3	0	1	-2	-2.0	-2	0
1969	MIN	3	3	38	**153**	4.0	20	**4**	2	11	5.5	**10**	0
1970	MIN	1	1	12	41	3.4	**22**	0	0	0	0.0	0	0
1971	MIN	1	1	6	13	2.2	8	0	0	0	0.0	0	0
1973	MIN	3	0	4	27	**6.8**	15	0	0	0	0.0	0	0
1974	MIN	3	3	**44**	142	3.2	12	1	**7**	**44**	**6.3**	9	0
1975	MIN	1	0	0	0	0.0	0	0	0	0	0.0	0	0
		13	9	109	380	3.5	22	5	10	53	5.3	10	0
