= Jim Vellone =

American football player (1944–1977)

No. 63
- Position: Guard

Personal information
- Born: August 20, 1944; Camp Lejeune, North Carolina, U.S.
- Died: August 21, 1977 (aged 33); Orange, California, U.S.
- Listed height: 6 ft 3 in (1.91 m)
- Listed weight: 255 lb (116 kg)

Career information
- High school: Whittier (CA) California
- College: USC (1964-1965)
- NFL draft: 1966: undrafted

Career history
- Minnesota Vikings (1966–1970)

Awards and highlights
- NFL champion (1969)

Career NFL statistics
- Games played: 66
- Games started: 48
- Fumble recoveries: 1
- Stats at Pro Football Reference

James Carl Vellone (August 20, 1944 - August 21, 1977) was a guard in the National Football League (NFL). Vellone spent his entire five-year career for the Minnesota Vikings, starting in most of his appearances during this span. Vellone helped the Vikings win the 1969 NFL Championship and also started in Super Bowl IV, the first Super Bowl appearance for the Vikings franchise. Vellone's career and life were cut short due to Hodgkin lymphoma.

== College career ==
Before he joined the pro leagues, Vellone played college football for two years at the University of Southern California. Prior to joining the USC Trojans, Vellone was a Junior College All-American guard at Cerritos College. For two seasons while in Minnesota (1968–1969), Vellone was a teammate of offensive tackle Ron Yary, who likewise was a star lineman at Cerritos College and at USC.

== Death ==
Jim Vellone abruptly retired from the NFL in 1971 when he discovered he had Hodgkin's lymphoma. He spent the final six years of his life undergoing treatments and chemotherapy. Although managing to live a normal life for some time, Vellone finally succumbed to the cancerous disease on August 21, 1977, a day after his 33rd birthday, at St. Joseph's Hospital in Orange, California. According to a brief article in the St. Petersburg Times (Fla.) newspaper two days after his death, friends said that Vellone checked into St. Joseph's, due to breathing problems.

Jim Vellone left behind two sons Eric and John, brother Louis, and parents

== Other ==
Jim's high school alma mater named their Athlete of the Year award after him. The award's recipients included Greg Langford (Wrestling, 1972), Paul Phillips (Swimming, 1973), and Bill Qualls (Cross Country and Track, 1974).
