= Len Johnson (American football) =

American football player (born 1946)

No. 59
- Positions: Center, Guard

Personal information
- Born: January 26, 1946 (age 80); Worthington, Minnesota, U.S.
- Listed height: 6 ft 2 in (1.88 m)
- Listed weight: 250 lb (113 kg)

Career information
- High school: Worthington
- College: St. Cloud State (1965-1968)
- NFL draft: 1969: undrafted

Career history
- Minnesota Vikings (1969)*; New York Giants (1970)
- * Offseason or practice squad member only

Career NFL statistics
- Games played: 3
- Stats at Pro Football Reference

Leonard L. Johnson (born January 26, 1946) is an American former professional football player who was a center for the New York Giants of the National Football League (NFL). He played college football for the St. Cloud State Huskies.
