= Billy Harris (American football) =

American football player (born 1946)

No. 35, 30
- Position: Running back

Personal information
- Born: January 17, 1946 (age 80); Galveston, Texas, U.S.
- Listed height: 6 ft 2 in (1.88 m)
- Listed weight: 204 lb (93 kg)

Career information
- High school: Central (Galveston)
- College: Colorado
- NFL draft: 1968: 13th round, 329th overall pick

Career history
- Atlanta Falcons (1968); Minnesota Vikings (1969); New Orleans Saints (1971)

Awards and highlights
- NFL champion (1969); 2× Second-team All-Big Eight (1965, 1966)

Career NFL statistics
- Rushing yards: 158
- Rushing average: 2.6
- Receptions: 5
- Receiving yards: 131
- Total touchdowns: 1
- Stats at Pro Football Reference

William Andrew Harris Jr. (born January 17, 1946) is an American former professional football player who was a running back in the National Football League (NFL). He played college football for the Colorado Buffaloes. Harris played in the NFL for the Atlanta Falcons in 1968, the Minnesota Vikings in 1969 and for the New Orleans Saints in 1971.
