= Kent Kramer =

American football player (1944–2024)

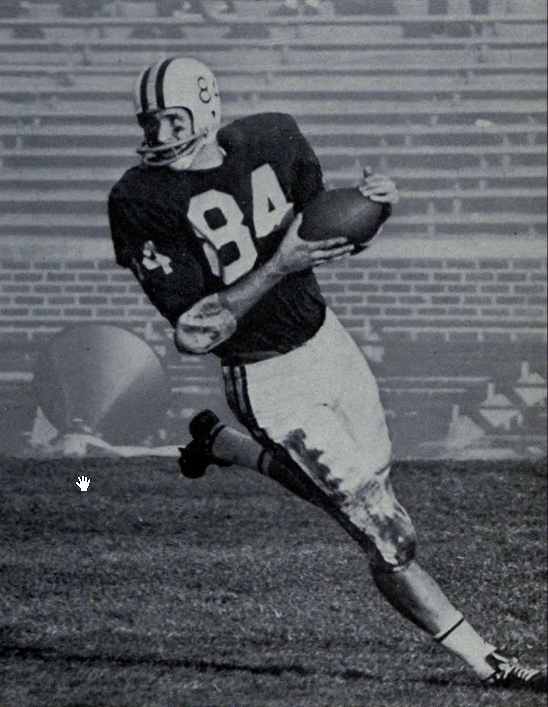
- Kramer in end zone after 60-yard touchdown, 1964

No. 89, 87
- Position: Tight end

Personal information
- Born: July 21, 1944; Los Angeles, California, U.S.
- Died: February 21, 2024 (aged 79)
- Listed height: 6 ft 4 in (1.93 m)
- Listed weight: 235 lb (107 kg)

Career information
- High school: Temple City (Temple City, California)
- College: Minnesota
- NFL draft: 1966: 9th round, 133rd overall pick
- AFL draft: 1966: 13th round, 110th overall pick

Career history
- San Francisco 49ers (1966); New Orleans Saints (1967); Minnesota Vikings (1969–1970); Philadelphia Eagles (1971–1974)

Awards and highlights
- NFL champion (1969)

Career NFL statistics
- Receptions: 45
- Receiving yards: 576
- Touchdowns: 8
- Stats at Pro Football Reference

Kent Devlin Kramer (July 21, 1944 – February 21, 2024) was an American professional football player who was a tight end in the National Football League (NFL) for the San Francisco 49ers, New Orleans Saints, Minnesota Vikings, and the Philadelphia Eagles. He played college football for the Minnesota Golden Gophers.

Kramer attended Temple City High School in Temple City, California where he played varsity football for three years and was an All-CIF pick in 1961 for the undefeated Rams.

Kramer died on February 21, 2024, at the age of 79.
