= Mike McGill (American football) =

American football player (born 1946)

No. 55, 56
- Position: Linebacker

Personal information
- Born: November 21, 1946 (age 79); Hammond, Indiana, U.S.
- Listed height: 6 ft 2 in (1.88 m)
- Listed weight: 235 lb (107 kg)

Career information
- High school: Bishop Noll (Hammond)
- College: Notre Dame
- NFL draft: 1968: 3rd round, 76th overall pick

Career history
- Minnesota Vikings (1968–1970); St. Louis Cardinals (1971–1972)

Awards and highlights
- NFL champion (1969); National champion (1966)

Career NFL statistics
- Fumble recoveries: 1
- Interceptions: 3
- Touchdowns: 1
- Stats at Pro Football Reference

Mike McGill (born November 21, 1946) is an American former professional football player who was a linebacker in the National Football League (NFL). He played for the Minnesota Vikings from 1968 to 1970 and for the St. Louis Cardinals from 1971 to 1972.
