= Charlie West (American football) =

American football player and coach (born 1946)

No. 40, 47
- Positions: Safety, Cornerback

Personal information
- Born: August 31, 1946 (age 80); Terrell, Texas, U.S.
- Listed height: 6 ft 1 in (1.85 m)
- Listed weight: 197 lb (89 kg)

Career information
- High school: Big Spring (Big Spring, Texas)
- College: Angelo State; UTEP
- NFL draft: 1968: 2nd round, 33rd overall pick

Career history

Playing
- Minnesota Vikings (1968–1973); Detroit Lions (1974–1977); Denver Broncos (1978–1979)

Coaching
- California (1980) Defensive backs coach; Denver Broncos (1981–1989) Defensive backs coach; New England Patriots (1991–1992) Defensive backs coach

Awards and highlights
- NFL champion (1969); Second-team All-American (1967)

Career NFL statistics
- Interceptions: 15
- Fumble recoveries: 7
- Kick/punt return yards: 3,226
- Total touchdowns: 1
- Sacks: 0.5
- Stats at Pro Football Reference

Charlie West (born August 31, 1946) is an American former professional football player who was a safety who played for three National Football League (NFL) teams. He played in Super Bowl IV as a member of the Minnesota Vikings. He also still holds the University of Texas El Paso career record of 19 interceptions, including a school record four in one game. He currently lives near New York City and coaches the Carmel High School football team in New York, serving as the defensive coordinator.

West returned kicks and punts for the Minnesota Vikings, and still holds the team's record for longest punt return. On November 3, 1968, playing the Washington Redskins, West returned a Mike Bragg punt 98 yards for a touchdown. He was one of the fifteen plaintiffs in Mackey v. National Football League in which Judge Earl R. Larson declared that the Rozelle rule was a violation of antitrust laws on December 30, 1975.
