= John Beasley (American football) =

American football player (born 1945)

No. 87, 85, 84
- Position: Tight end

Personal information
- Born: April 6, 1945 (age 81); Pasadena, California, U.S.
- Listed height: 6 ft 3 in (1.91 m)
- Listed weight: 228 lb (103 kg)

Career information
- High school: Buena Park
- College: California (1963–1966)
- NFL draft: 1967: 8th round, 197th overall pick

Career history
- Minnesota Vikings (1967–1973); New Orleans Saints (1973–1974)

Awards and highlights
- NFL champion (1969)

Career NFL statistics
- Receptions: 151
- Receiving yards: 1,607
- Receiving touchdowns: 13
- Stats at Pro Football Reference

John Walter Beasley (born April 6, 1945) is an American former professional football player who was a tight end in the National Football League (NFL). Born in Pasadena, California, he was raised in Orange County, California and graduated from Buena Park High School. As a senior, Beasley was named All-Freeway League and All-Orange County playing end for the Coyotes, while also lettering in basketball. Beasley went on to play college football for the California Golden Bears. Standing 6'3", 228 lb (103 kg), Beasley was selected by the Minnesota Vikings in the eighth round of the 1967 NFL/AFL draft. Spending his rookie year as a backup, he cracked the starting lineup in his second season, and by his third was a full time starter for head coach Bud Grant. In 1969, Beasley had his most productive season, starting 12 of 14 regular season games and catching 33 passes for 361 yards and four touchdowns. That season, Beasley helped the Vikings earn the NFL Championship and was in the starting lineup as a tight end in Super Bowl IV. He caught two passes for 41 yards in Minnesota's 24-7 loss to the Kansas City Chiefs. Beasley continued to play for the Vikings until he was traded midway through the 1973 season to New Orleans. He played for the Saints through the end of the 1974 season, and finished his eight-year NFL career with 151 receptions for 1,607 yards and 13 TDs.

Following his playing career, Beasley worked as a color commentator for the USA Network and called, along with Barry Tompkins, The Play in 1982, when California scored on the last play of the game to defeat Stanford 25–20.

While he had been a pro football player, Beasley first invested in an Idaho gold mine, and remained involved in the enterprise for nearly 40 years, becoming a millionaire in the process.
