= Doug Davis (American football) =

American football player (1944–2011)

No. 71
- Position: Offensive tackle

Personal information
- Born: July 2, 1944; Elkton, Maryland, U.S.
- Died: February 10, 2011 (aged 66); Brandon, Florida, U.S.
- Listed height: 6 ft 4 in (1.93 m)
- Listed weight: 255 lb (116 kg)

Career information
- High school: Centerburg (OH)
- College: Kentucky
- NFL draft: 1966: 5th round, 72nd overall pick

Career history
- Minnesota Vikings (1966–1972)

Awards and highlights
- NFL champion (1969); Second-team All-SEC (1965)

Career NFL statistics
- Games played: 79
- Games started: 34
- Fumble recoveries: 2
- Stats at Pro Football Reference

Douglas Sherone Davis (July 2, 1944 – February 10, 2011) was a professional American football tackle for seven seasons for the Minnesota Vikings of the National Football League (NFL). He was born July 2, 1944, in Elkton, Md. and was the son of Newton and Grace Reynolds Davis. He was married to Roberta and had a son Brian Davis. His siblings include (sisters) Christine Thomas, Bertha (Lowell) Kennedy, Nancy (James) Griffith, Brothers Larry (Phyllis) Davis, Kenneth Davis, Earnst (Brenda) Davis. Doug graduated from Centerburg High School in Central Ohio in 1962 and continued his education at the University of Kentucky. He was a member of the Wildcat football team from 1962 to 1966. He was chosen by the Wigman of America to be a National High School All American All Star player which earned him the right to play in the All-Star game in Dallas, Texas. Drafted in the fifth round of the 1966 NFL draft, first pick by the Minnesota Vikings, he appeared in 148 career regular season games. Along with Grady Alderman, Mick Tingelhoff, Jim Vellone and Milt Sunde, he formed a highly-effective offensive line which played a significant role in the Vikings reaching Super Bowl IV in 1970. Following his football career, Davis worked as a highly respected national sales director for a water technology company for 25 years in Sarasota FL.

He died on 10 February 2011 in Brandon, Florida where he lived. He was 66.
