= Fred Cox =

American football player (1938–2019)

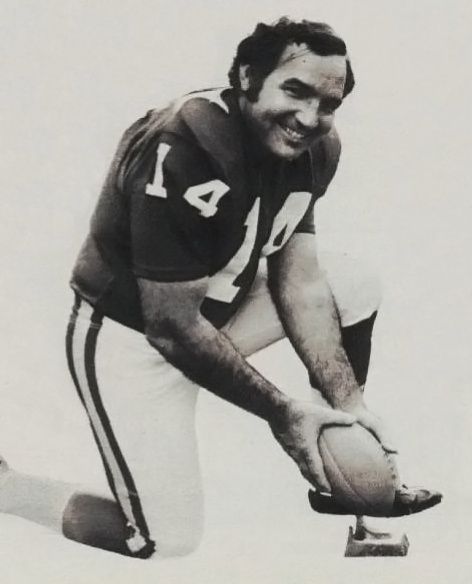

No. 14
- Position: Placekicker

Personal information
- Born: December 11, 1938; Monongahela, Pennsylvania, U.S.
- Died: November 20, 2019 (aged 80); Monticello, Minnesota, U.S.
- Listed height: 5 ft 11 in (1.80 m)
- Listed weight: 200 lb (91 kg)

Career information
- High school: Monongahela
- College: Pittsburgh (1959–1962)
- NFL draft: 1961: 8th round, 110th overall pick
- AFL draft: 1961: 28th round, 221st overall pick

Career history
- Minnesota Vikings (1963–1977)

Awards and highlights
- NFL champion (1969); Pro Bowl (1970); 2× NFL scoring leader (1969, 1970); 50 Greatest Vikings; Minnesota Vikings 25th Anniversary Team; Minnesota Vikings 40th Anniversary Team; 2× Second-team All-Eastern (1960, 1961)

Career NFL statistics
- Field goals attempted: 455
- Field goals made: 282
- Field goal percentage: 62%
- Extra points attempted: 539
- Extra points made: 519
- Extra points percentage: 96.3%
- Points scored: 1,365
- Stats at Pro Football Reference

Fred William Cox (December 11, 1938 – November 20, 2019) was an American professional football player who was a placekicker for 15 seasons for the Minnesota Vikings of the National Football League (NFL). After playing college football for the Pittsburgh Panthers, he was selected by the Cleveland Browns in the eighth round of the 1961 NFL draft and by the New York Titans in the 28th round of the 1961 AFL draft. He was also the inventor of the Nerf football.

== Early life ==
Cox was raised in Monongahela, Pennsylvania, outside Pittsburgh. His parents owned and operated a small grocery store, which is still in operation by his brother's family after four generations.

== College career ==
Cox played college football at the University of Pittsburgh and was selected by the Cleveland Browns in the eighth round of the 1961 NFL draft and the New York Titans in the 28th round of the AFL Draft that same year. He never ended up playing for either team.

== Professional career ==
Cox is the Vikings' all-time leader in scoring (1,365 points) and field goals (282). He is also one of 11 Vikings players to have played in all four of their Super Bowl appearances during the 1970s.

In his first season, he kicked 12 out of 24 field goals, the longest being 46 yards while also serving as a punter, kicking 70 of them for 2,707 yards (a 38.7 yard average). He did not have a field goal percentage lower than his first year rate until his last season. He led the NFL in scoring in 1969 with 121 points and again in 1970 with 125 and was named first-team All-Pro both years. He was also named NFC first-team All-Pro in 1971 with 91 points scored. He topped 100 points four times (1964–65, 1969–70) while having at least 90 in three other seasons (1971–73), with a top 10 finish in points scored ten times. In the playoffs, he was 11 of 18 on field goals and 38 for 40 on extra points in 18 games. The most he scored in those games was nine, which he did three times (the 1969 title game and the first two rounds of the 1973 playoffs). In those Super Bowls, he went 0 for 2 on field goals while making 4 of 5 on extra points. In 1970, he was the NFC kicker in the Pro Bowl game.

At the time of his retirement, Cox was the NFL's second all-time leading scorer (with 1,365 points) behind George Blanda.

== Personal life ==
Cox was first married to Elayne Darrall Cox. Their four children are Darryl Cox, Susan Cox Biasco, Fred A. Cox, and Kim Ok-soon. He was later married to Bonnie Hope Cox.

In 1972, he earned a chiropractic degree from Northwestern Health Sciences University. His annual chiropractic earnings of about $100,000 were, Cox said, about double what he made as a football player. He opened his chiropractic office in Buffalo, MN in 1975. Soon after he hired Dan Marty as his partner who helped him run the office while he finished his last 3 years playing with the Vikings. Dan continued as his partner until 1988. In 1988 he moved home to Monongahela, PA where he opened a new chiropractic clinic with his daughter, Susan. Three years later he moved back to Monticello, Minnesota where he practiced chiropractic part time before eventually retiring.

In 1972, he invented a soft football, which later became the Nerf football after he sold the idea to Parker Brothers the following year. Tens of millions of Nerf footballs have been sold, first for Parker Brothers and then for Hasbro, which acquired it in 1991, bringing Cox and his partners decades of generous royalties. Cox died on November 28, 2019 at his home in Monticello, Minnesota. No cause of death was announced although Cox had recently been treated for kidney issues.
