= John Henderson (wide receiver) =

American football player (born 1943)

No. 87, 80
- Position: Wide receiver

Personal information
- Born: March 21, 1943 (age 83); Dayton, Ohio, U.S.
- Listed height: 6 ft 3 in (1.91 m)
- Listed weight: 195 lb (88 kg)

Career information
- High school: Roosevelt (Dayton)
- College: Michigan
- NFL draft: 1965: 5th round, 63rd overall pick
- AFL draft: 1965: 17th round, 136th overall pick

Career history
- Detroit Lions (1965–1967); Minnesota Vikings (1968–1972)

Awards and highlights
- NFL champion (1969); Second-team All-Big Ten (1964)

Career NFL statistics
- Receptions: 108
- Receiving yards: 1,735
- Receiving touchdowns: 10
- Stats at Pro Football Reference

John William Henderson (born March 21, 1943) is an American former professional football player who was a wide receiver in the National Football League (NFL). He played college football for the Michigan Wolverines in 1963 and 1964. He played in the NFL from 1965 to 1972. He was the leading receiver in Super Bowl IV with seven catches for 111 yards for the Minnesota Vikings.

Henderson was born in Dayton, Ohio, in 1943 and attended Roosevelt High School. He played college football at the end position for Michigan in 1963 and 1964. He gained 330 receiving yards on 27 catches in 1963 and 377 yards on 31 catches in 1964.

Henderson was selected by the Philadelphia Eagles in the fifth round (63rd overall) of the 1965 NFL draft. He played eight seasons in the NFL for the Detroit Lions (1965–1967) and Minnesota (1968–1972). His best year in the NFL was 1969 when he caught 34 passes for 553 yards and five touches. The Vikings won the 1969 NFL Championship Game and advanced to play the Kansas City Chiefs in Super Bowl IV; Henderson was the game's leading receiver with seven catches for 111 yards. In his eight-year NFL career, Henderson appeared in 93 games and had 108 receptions for 1,735 yards and 10 touchdowns.

He was one of the fifteen plaintiffs in Mackey v. National Football League in which Judge Earl R. Larson declared that the Rozelle rule was a violation of antitrust laws on December 30, 1975.
