= 1969 NFL Championship Game =

Coordinates: 44.854°N 93.242°W

- 1969 NFL Championship Game official program
| Cleveland Browns (Century, Eastern) (10–3–1) | Minnesota Vikings (Central, Western) (12–2) |
|---|---|
| 7 | 27 |
| Head coach: Blanton Collier | Head coach: Bud Grant |
| | 1 | 2 | 3 | 4 | Total |
|---|---|---|---|---|---|
| CLE | 0 | 0 | 0 | 7 | 7 |
| MIN | 14 | 10 | 3 | 0 | 27 |
- Date: January 4, 1970
- Stadium: Metropolitan Stadium; Bloomington, Minnesota
- MVP: Joe Kapp (Quarterback; Minnesota)
- Attendance: 47,900

TV in the United States
- Network: CBS
- Announcers: Ray Scott, Paul Christman, and Bruce Roberts

Radio in the United States
- Network: CBS

Location in the United States
Location in Minnesota

The 1969 NFL Championship Game was the 37th and final championship game prior to the AFL–NFL merger, played January 4, 1970, at Metropolitan Stadium in Bloomington, Minnesota, a suburb south of Minneapolis. The winner of the game earned a berth in Super Bowl IV in New Orleans against the champion of the American Football League, the Kansas City Chiefs.

The Minnesota Vikings of the Western Conference hosted the Cleveland Browns of the Eastern Conference. It was the Vikings' first appearance in the title game, while the Browns were making their second straight appearance and fourth of the 1960s.

Minnesota had a regular season record of 12–2, including a 51–3 defeat of the Browns eight weeks earlier on November 9. The Vikings defeated the Los Angeles Rams 23–20 in the Western Conference championship a week earlier at Met Stadium. They were coached by Bud Grant and led on offense by quarterback Joe Kapp and wide receiver Gene Washington. The defense allowed only 133 points (9½ per game) during the regular season and their four defensive linemen were known as the "Purple People Eaters."

Cleveland was 10–3–1 during the regular season and had upset the Dallas Cowboys 38–14 at the Cotton Bowl for the Eastern Conference title. The Browns were coached by Blanton Collier; Bill Nelsen was the starting quarterback and Gary Collins and Paul Warfield were star wide receivers for the team.

Although not as severe as the "Ice Bowl" of 1967, the weather conditions were bitterly cold at 8 °F (−13 °C), with a sub-zero wind chill factor. Cleveland linebacker Jim Houston suffered frostbite during the game and was hospitalized.

Minnesota was favored by nine points to win the title game at home, and they won, 27–7.

Of the four NFL teams that joined the league during the AFL era (1960s), Minnesota was the sole winner of a pre-merger NFL championship. The Dallas Cowboys entered the league in 1960 and lost two NFL title games to the Green Bay Packers, in 1966 and 1967. The expansion Atlanta Falcons (1966) and New Orleans Saints (1967) did not qualify for the postseason until 1978 and 1987, respectively.

The Vikings would go on to lose Super Bowl IV 23–7 to the AFL champion Kansas City Chiefs. Starting with the 1970 season, the NFL champion was determined in the Super Bowl, beginning with Super Bowl V.

This was also the final broadcasting assignment for Paul Christman, who died less than two months later on March 2.

== Game summary ==
Cleveland had lost the previous season's NFL title game 34–0 at home, and this time fared little better. The Vikings dominated the game, racking up 381 yards with no turnovers, while Cleveland gained just 268 yards and turned the ball over three times.

The Vikings took a lead just four minutes into the first quarter, driving 70 yards for a touchdown in 8 plays. The key play of the drive was a pass from Joe Kapp to receiver Gene Washington that was nearly 5 yards short of the mark. Despite the short throw, Washington was able to come back and haul it in for a 33-yard gain to the Browns' 24-yard line. Two plays later, Dave Osborn's 12-yard run moved the ball to the 7. Then two plays after that, Bill Brown accidentally slipped and bumped into Kapp while moving up to take a handoff, but Kapp simply kept the ball himself and ran it 7 yards for a touchdown.

The situation never improved for Cleveland. The next time Minnesota took possession of the ball, defensive back Erich Barnes slipped while in one-on-one coverage with Washington, enabling him to catch a pass from Kapp and run to the end zone for a 75-yard touchdown completion. Barnes had been knocked down by linebacker Jim Houston, his teammate; the score was 14–0 after just over 7 minutes of play. Near the end of the first quarter, Browns running back Leroy Kelly lost a fumble that was recovered by linebacker Wally Hilgenberg on the Cleveland 43. Kapp then completed a 12-yard pass to Washington before Fred Cox finished the drive with a 30-yard field goal, putting the Vikings up 17–0. Later in the second period, Hilgenberg snuffed out a Cleveland scoring threat by intercepting a pass from Bill Nelsen on the Vikings' 33-yard line. Minnesota subsequently drove 67 yards in 8 plays. Kapp started the drive with a pair of completions to John Henderson for 17 total yards, while Osborn broke off a 16-yard run and ended up finishing the drive with a 20-yard touchdown burst, giving the Vikings a 24–0 lead with 4:46 left in the first half. Cleveland responded with a drive to the Vikings' 17, but turned the ball over on downs when Nelsen overthrew receiver Gary Collins in the end zone on 4th and 3.

The third quarter was mostly uneventful, with the exception of Fred Cox's 32-yard field goal that gave Minnesota a 27–0 lead after an 11-play, 80-yard drive. The most noteworthy play was a 13-yard scramble by Kapp in which he plowed into 240-pound Browns linebacker Jim Houston so hard that Houston was knocked out of the game. In the 4th quarter, Cleveland finally got on the board when a diving 18-yard reception by Paul Warfield (playing his final game in his first stint with the Cleveland Browns; Warfield would be traded to Miami in 1970 and wouldn't return to Cleveland until 1976) set up Nelsen's 3-yard touchdown pass to Collins. There were still 13 minutes on the clock at this point, but there would be no more scoring. The Vikings had a drive to the Cleveland 2-yard line, but decided to let the clock run out instead of go for another score.

Kapp completed 7 of 13 passes for 169 yards and a touchdown, while also rushing for 57 yards and another score. Osborn rushed 18 times for 108 yards and a touchdown. Washington had 120 yards and a touchdown on just 3 receptions. Kelly was the Browns' top rusher with 80 yards, while also catching two passes for 17. Nelsen completed 17 of 33 passes for 181 yards, with one touchdown and two interceptions. The Browns had trouble on the frozen turf of Metropolitan Stadium even though many players wore broomball shoes.

== Scoring summary ==
Minnesota Vikings 27, Cleveland Browns 7

| Quarter | 1 | 2 | 3 | 4 | Total |
|---|---|---|---|---|---|
| Browns | 0 | 0 | 0 | 7 | 7 |
| Vikings | 14 | 10 | 3 | 0 | 27 |

at Metropolitan Stadium, Bloomington, Minnesota

- Date: January 4, 1970
- Game time: 12:00 p.m. CST
- Game weather: 8 °F (−13 °C), wind 9 mph (14 km/h), wind chill −6 °F (−21 °C), relative humidity 75%
- Game attendance: 46,503
- Referee: Tommy Bell
- TV: CBS
- Pro-Football-Reference.com

Game information

First quarter

- MIN – Joe Kapp 7-yard run (Fred Cox kick). Vikings 7–0.
- MIN – Gene Washington 75-yard pass from Joe Kapp (Fred Cox kick). Vikings 14–0.

Second quarter

- MIN – Fred Cox 30-yard field goal. Vikings 17–0.
- MIN – Dave Osborn 20-yard run (Fred Cox kick). Vikings 24–0.

Third quarter

- MIN – Fred Cox 32-yard field goal. Vikings 27–0.

Fourth quarter

- CLE – Gary Collins 3-yard pass from Bill Nelsen (Don Cockroft kick). Vikings 27–7.

Top passers

- CLE – Bill Nelsen – 17/33, 181 yards, TD, 2 INT
- MIN – Joe Kapp – 7/13, 169 yards, TD

Top rushers

- CLE – Leroy Kelly – 15 rushes, 80 yards
- MIN – Dave Osborn – 18 rushes, 108 yards, TD

Top receivers

- CLE – Bo Scott – 5 receptions, 56 yards
- MIN – Gene Washington – 3 receptions, 120 yards, TD

== Officials ==
- Referee: Tommy Bell (7)
- Umpire: Joe Connell (57)
- Head linesman: George Murphy (30)
- Line judge: Jack Fette (39)
- Back judge: Ralph Vandenberg (47)
- Field judge: Fritz Graf (34)

The NFL had six game officials in 1969.

== See also ==
- 1969–70 NFL playoffs
- 1969 NFL season
- History of the NFL championship
- 1969 American Football League Championship Game
