= 1969 Kansas City Chiefs season =

10th season in franchise history; first Super Bowl win

- Owner: Lamar Hunt
- General manager: Jack Steadman
- Head coach: Hank Stram
- Home stadium: Municipal Stadium

Results
- Record: 11–3
- Division place: 2nd AFL Western
- Playoffs: Won Divisional Playoffs (at Jets) 13–6; Won AFL Championship (at Raiders) 17–7; Won Super Bowl IV (vs. Vikings) 23–7
- All-Pros: 14: LB Bobby Bell; DE Aaron Brown; DT Buck Buchanan; G Ed Budde; OT Dave Hill; C E.J. Holub; LB Willie Lanier; LB Jim Lynch; DE Jerry Mays; G Mo Moorman; S Johnny Robinson; K Jan Stenerud; OT Jim Tyrer; P Jerrel Wilson
- Pro Bowlers: 11: LB Bobby Bell; DT Buck Buchanan; G Ed Budde; DT Curley Culp; QB Len Dawson; RB Robert Holmes; LB Willie Lanier; QB Mike Livingston; CB Jim Marsalis; K Jan Stenerud; OT Jim Tyrer

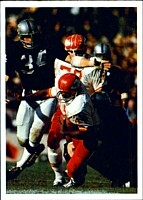
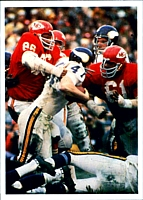
The Chiefs topped the Raiders in the 1969 AFL championship game (left) and went on to defeat the Vikings in Super Bowl IV (right).

The 1969 Kansas City Chiefs season was the team's tenth, their seventh in Kansas City, and the final season of the American Football League (AFL). It resulted in an 11–3 regular season record and three postseason road victories, including a 23–7 victory in Super Bowl IV over the NFL's heavily favored Minnesota Vikings. The Chiefs were the second AFL team to win the Super Bowl and last AFL team to do so before the AFL-NFL Merger in the following season.

After two close losses to division rival Oakland in the regular season, the visiting Chiefs upset the Raiders in the final AFL Championship Game, claiming their third AFL title. The Chiefs were led by head coach Hank Stram, quarterback Len Dawson, and a powerful defense led by Bobby Bell, Willie Lanier, Buck Buchanan, Emmitt Thomas, Johnny Robinson, and Curley Culp. The Chiefs' defense became the fourth defense in the history of pro football to lead its league in fewest rushing yards, fewest passing yards and fewest total yards. Kansas City also ranked second in the AFL in total offense and first in rushing offense. The Chiefs outgained opponents by more than twice as many yards rushing per game.

The season was marred not only by an injury to quarterback Len Dawson, but also controversy surrounding Dawson and his purported involvement in a sports gambling ring. Back-up quarterback Mike Livingston and the Chiefs' stellar defense led the Chiefs back to the Super Bowl, this time, to win it all.

Along with owner Lamar Hunt, nine future Hall of Famers were members of the 1969 Chiefs, including QB Len Dawson, LB Willie Lanier, LB Bobby Bell, DT Buck Buchanan, DT Curley Culp, CB Emmitt Thomas, S Johnny Robinson, K Jan Stenerud, and head coach Hank Stram.

In 2006, the 1969 Kansas City Chiefs were ranked as the 18th greatest Super Bowl champions on the NFL Network's documentary America's Game: The Super Bowl Champions, the 1969 Kansas City Chiefs, with team commentary from Len Dawson, Willie Lanier and Jim Lynch, and narrated by Martin Sheen.

In 2007, ESPN.com ranked the 1969 Chiefs as the seventh-greatest defense in NFL history, noting "Hank Stram's 'Triple Stack' defense, which gave the linebackers lots of room to roam, was superb, holding five opponents to fewer than 10 points and giving up an average of less than two touchdowns a game.... Then they got serious. Against the [defending] Super Bowl champion Jets in the AFL divisional playoff game at Shea Stadium, the Chiefs held on for a 13–6 victory, thanks to a remarkable three-play goal line stand that stifled the Jets on the one. After losing twice to the Raiders during the regular season, the Chiefs allowed a single touchdown, in the first quarter, to win the AFL title over Oakland 17–7. The Chiefs defense then stifled the Vikings in the Super Bowl, allowing only two rushing first downs and picking off three passes in the fourth quarter to win 23–7. Total points against the Chiefs in the playoffs: 20." Kansas City is the only team in the Super Bowl era to win the title without allowing as much as 10 points in any postseason game.

The Chiefs did not return to or win the Super Bowl again until Super Bowl LIV in the 2019 season.

== Offseason ==
=== 1969 AFL draft ===
In the first round of the 1969 AFL draft, the Chiefs selected cornerback Jim Marsalis from Tennessee State. Marsalis became an immediate starter at cornerback alongside veteran Emmitt Thomas. He was the only Chiefs rookie to start for the 1969 team, as Ed Podolak and Bob Stein were benched, and Morris Stroud and Jack Rudnay sat out the season with injuries.

1969 Kansas City Chiefs Draft
Round	Selection	Player	Position	College	Notes
1	23	Jim Marsalis	Defensive back	Tennessee State	
2	48	Ed Podolak	Running back	Iowa	
3	61	Traded to Denver			from Boston
3	76	Morris Stroud	Tight end	Clark	
4	101	Jack Rudnay	Center	Northwestern	
5	126	Bob Stein	Linebacker	Minnesota	
6	155	John Pleasant	Running back	Alabama State	
7	179	Tom Nettles	Wide receiver	San Diego State	
8	204	Clanton King	Tackle	Purdue	
8	206	Maurice LeBlanc	Defensive back	Louisiana State	from Oakland
9	231	Dan Klepper	Guard	Omaha	
10	257	John Spoonheimer	Defensive tackle	Cornell	
11	282	Skip Wupper	Defensive end	C.W. Post	
12	309	John Lavin	Linebacker	Notre Dame	
13	335	Rick Piland	Guard	Virginia Tech	
14	360	Al Bream	Defensive back	Iowa	
15	388	Leland Winston	Offensive tackle	Rice	
16	413	Eural Johnson	Defensive back	Prairie View	
17	438	Ralph Jenkins	Defensive back	Tuskegee	

== Personnel ==
=== Staff ===
1969 Kansas City Chiefs staff
Front office: Founder – Lamar Hunt; Executive vice-president and general manager – Jack Steadman; Head coaches: Head coach – Hank Stram; Offensive coaches: Offensive backfield - John Beake; Offensive ends – Darrel Brewster; Offensive line – Bill Walsh	Defensive coaches: Defensive backs - Tom Bettis; Defensive assistant – Tommy O'Boyle; Defensive line – Tom Pratt

== Roster ==
1969 Kansas City Chiefs roster
Quarterbacks (QB): 16 Len Dawson; 12 Tom Flores; 10 Mike Livingston; Running backs (RB): 21 Mike Garrett; 38 Wendell Hayes; 45 Robert Holmes; 6 Warren McVea; 14 Ed Podolak; Wide receivers (WR): 25 Frank Pitts SE; 30 Gloster Richardson FL; 89 Otis Taylor FL; Tight ends (TE): 84 Fred Arbanas; 32 Curtis McClinton	Offensive linemen (OL): 71 Ed Budde G; 60 George Daney G; 73 Dave Hill T; 55 E. J. Holub C; 76 Mo Moorman G; 65 Remi Prudhomme C; 77 Jim Tyrer T; Defensive linemen (DL): 87 Aaron Brown DE; 86 Buck Buchanan DT; 61 Curley Culp DT; 82 Ed Lothamer DT; 75 Jerry Mays DE; 74 Gene Trosch DE	Linebackers (LB): 78 Bobby Bell OLB; 85 Chuck Hurston OLB; 63 Willie Lanier MLB; 51 Jim Lynch OLB; 66 Bob Stein MLB; Defensive backs (DB): 24 Caesar Belser SS; 46 Jim Kearney SS; 40 Jim Marsalis CB; 22 Willie Mitchell CB; 42 Johnny Robinson FS; 20 Goldie Sellers CB; 18 Emmitt Thomas CB; Special teams (ST): 3 Jan Stenerud K; 44 Jerrel Wilson P	Taxi squad: 35 Richard Armstrong RB; 7 John Huarte QB; 81 Mickey McCarty TE; 88 Morris Stroud TE; Reserve: 80 Reggie Carolan TE (IR); 23 Bert Coan RB (IR); 70 Clanton King T (NF-Ill.); 15 Jacky Lee QB (IR); 23 Paul Lowe RB (IR); 58 Jack Rudnay C (IR); Rookies in italics 40 active, 6 reserve, 4 practice squad

== Preseason ==
Week	Date	Opponent	Result	Record	Game Site	Attendance	Recap
1	August 2	vs. Oakland Raiders	W 23–17	1–0	Legion Field (Birmingham)	21,000	Recap
2	August 9	Detroit Lions	W 38–13	2–0	Municipal Stadium	38,000	Recap
3	August 16	vs. Cincinnati Bengals	W 23–7	3–0	Mississippi Veterans Memorial Stadium (Jackson)	24,513	Recap
4	August 23	at Los Angeles Rams	W 42–14	4–0	Los Angeles Memorial Coliseum	58,306	Recap
5	August 29	at St. Louis Cardinals	W 31–21	5–0	Busch Memorial Stadium	48,006	Recap
6	September 6	Atlanta Falcons	W 14–10	6–0	Municipal Stadium	37,273	Recap

== Regular season ==
The Chiefs began the regular season with four consecutive road games for the only time in team history, due to a scheduling conflict with the Kansas City Royals about usage of Municipal Stadium. After a decisive 27–9 win at San Diego (9/14), the club posted a 31–0 shutout at Boston (9/21), but QB Len Dawson sustained a knee injury against the Patriots. The once-optimistic picture for the Chiefs went from bad to worse the following week when backup QB Jacky Lee went down with a broken ankle in a 24–19 loss at Cincinnati (9/28). That injury left the team's most crucial position in the hands of second-year QB Mike Livingston, who took just five snaps as a rookie in ‘68.

However, Livingston engineered a five-game winning streak, while getting plenty of help from the club's defense. The team's home opener at Municipal Stadium was played in a daylong deluge referred to as a "frog-strangler" by Chiefs radio broadcaster Bill Grigsby. The Chiefs and Oilers combined for 14 fumbles in a 24–0 Kansas City victory (10/12).

Dawson returned to the starting lineup in a 27–3 win vs. San Diego (11/9) and guided the club to three wins in the season's next four games. Denver Broncos coach Lou Saban was infuriated following the Chiefs 31–17 win vs. Denver (11/27). Trailing 24–17 late in the game, Denver attempted an onside kick that was recovered by LB Bobby Bell, who promptly returned that kick for a 53-yard TD. Mike Livingston started the following week vs. Buffalo (12/7) for an again-injured Dawson, who returned for the regular-season finale at Oakland (12/13). A 10–6 loss vs. the Raiders gave the Chiefs an 11–3 record, good for second in the division behind Oakland (12–1–1).

=== Schedule ===
Week	Date	Opponent	Result	Record	Game Site	Attendance	Recap
1	September 14	at **San Diego Chargers**	**W** 27–9	1–0	San Diego Stadium	47,988	Recap
2	September 21	at Boston Patriots	**W** 31–0	2–0	Alumni Stadium	22,002	Recap
3	September 28	at **Cincinnati Bengals**	**L** 19–24	2–1	Nippert Stadium	27,812	Recap
4	October 5	at **Denver Broncos**	**W** 26–13	3–1	Mile High Stadium	50,564	Recap
5	October 12	Houston Oilers	**W** 24–0	4–1	Municipal Stadium	45,805	Recap
6	October 19	Miami Dolphins	**W** 17–10	5–1	Municipal Stadium	49,809	Recap
7	October 26	**Cincinnati Bengals**	**W** 42–22	6–1	Municipal Stadium	50,934	Recap
8	November 2	at Buffalo Bills	**W** 29–7	7–1	War Memorial Stadium	45,844	Recap
9	November 9	**San Diego Chargers**	**W** 27–3	8–1	Municipal Stadium	51,104	Recap
10	November 16	at New York Jets	**W** 34–16	9–1	Shea Stadium	63,849	Recap
11	November 23	**Oakland Raiders**	**L** 24–27	9–2	Municipal Stadium	51,982	Recap
12	November 27	**Denver Broncos**	**W** 31–17	10–2	Municipal Stadium	48,773	Recap
13	December 7	Buffalo Bills	**W** 22–19	11–2	Municipal Stadium	47,112	Recap
14	December 13	at **Oakland Raiders**	**L** 6–10	11–3	Oakland–Alameda County Coliseum	54,443	Recap
Note: Intra-division opponents are in **bold** text.

== Regular season game summaries ==
=== Week 1 (Sunday, September 14, 1969): at San Diego Chargers ===
Week 1: Kansas City Chiefs at San Diego Chargers – Game summary

Quarter	1	2	3	4	Total
Chiefs	3	10	7	7	27
Chargers	3	0	6	0	9

at San Diego Stadium, San Diego, California

- Date: September 14
- Game time: 3:00 p.m. CDT
- Game weather: 70 °F (21 °C)
- Game attendance: 47,988
- Referee: Bob Finley
- TV announcers (NBC): Jay Randolph and George Ratterman
- Recap

Game information

First quarter

- KC – Jan Stenerud 35-yard field goal. Chiefs 3–0.
- SD – Dennis Partee 50-yard field goal. Tied 3–3.

Second quarter

- KC – Wendell Hayes 1-yard run (Jan Stenerud kick). Chiefs 10–3.
- KC – Jan Stenerud 17-yard field goal. Chiefs 13–3.

Third quarter

- SD – John Hadl 9-yard run (kick failed). Chiefs 13–9.
- KC – Otis Taylor 55-yard pass from Len Dawson (Jan Stenerud kick). Chiefs 20–9.

Fourth quarter

- KC – Otis Taylor 9-yard pass from Len Dawson (Jan Stenerud kick). Chiefs 27–9.

Top passers

- KC – Len Dawson – 19/34, 224 yards, 2 TD, 2 INT
- SD – John Hadl – 16/29, 224 yards, 4 INT

Top rushers

- KC – Robert Holmes – 14 rushes, 58 yards
- SD – Marty Domres – 1 rush, 12 yards

Top receivers

- KC – Otis Taylor – 5 receptions, 112 yards, 2 TD
- SD – Lance Alworth – 4 receptions, 94 yards

=== Week 2 (Sunday, September 21, 1969): at Boston Patriots ===
Week 2: Kansas City Chiefs at Boston Patriots – Game summary

Quarter	1	2	3	4	Total
Chiefs	14	7	10	0	31
Patriots	0	0	0	0	0

at Alumni Stadium, Chestnut Hill, Massachusetts

- Date: September 21
- Game time: 12:30 p.m. CDT
- Game weather: 54 °F (12 °C)
- Game attendance: 22,002
- Referee: John McDonough
- TV announcers (NBC): Jay Randolph and George Ratterman
- Recap

Game information

First quarter

- KC – Mike Garrett 22-yard pass from Len Dawson (Jan Stenerud kick). Chiefs 7–0.
- KC – Otis Taylor 16-yard pass from Len Dawson (Jan Stenerud kick). Chiefs 14–0.

Second quarter

- KC – Mike Garrett 4-yard run (Jan Stenerud kick). Chiefs 21–0.

Third quarter

- KC – Robert Holmes 1-yard run (Jan Stenerud kick). Chiefs 28–0.
- KC – Jan Stenerud 16-yard field goal. Chiefs 31–0.

Fourth quarter

- No scoring plays.

Top passers

- KC – Len Dawson – 12/20, 140 yards, 2 TD, 2 INT
- BOS – Mike Taliaferro – 12/23, 77 yards

Top rushers

- KC – Mike Garrett – 14 rushes, 79 yards, TD
- BOS – Jim Nance – 7 rushes, 22 yards

Top receivers

- KC – Otis Taylor – 3 receptions, 58 yards, TD
- BOS – Carl Garrett – 5 receptions, 20 yards

=== Week 3 (Sunday, September 28, 1969): at Cincinnati Bengals ===
Week 3: Kansas City Chiefs at Cincinnati Bengals – Game summary

Quarter	1	2	3	4	Total
Chiefs	6	7	0	6	19
Bengals	7	3	0	14	24

at Nippert Stadium, Cincinnati, Ohio

- Date: September 28
- Game time: 12:30 p.m. CDT
- Game weather: 55 °F (13 °C)
- Game attendance: 27,812
- Referee: Walt Fitzgerald
- TV announcers (NBC): Jay Randolph and Elmer Angsman
- Recap

Game information

First quarter

- KC – Jan Stenerud 16-yard field goal. Chiefs 3–0.
- KC – Jan Stenerud 41-yard field goal. Chiefs 6–0.
- CIN – Eric Crabtree 17-yard pass from Greg Cook (Horst Mühlmann kick). Bengals 7–6.

Second quarter

- KC – Gloster Richardson 11-yard pass from Jacky Lee (Jan Stenerud kick). Chiefs 13–7.
- CIN – Horst Mühlmann 38-yard field goal. Chiefs 13–10.

Third quarter

- No scoring plays.

Fourth quarter

- CIN – Bob Trumpy 80-yard pass from Sam Wyche (Horst Mühlmann kick). Bengals 17–13.
- CIN – Jess Phillips 10-yard run (Horst Mühlmann kick). Bengals 24–13.
- KC – Wendell Hayes 10-yard run (run failed). Bengals 24–19.

Top passers

- KC – Mike Livingston – 9/17, 99 yards
- CIN – Sam Wyche – 9/14, 128 yards, TD, 2 INT

Top rushers

- KC – Robert Holmes – 17 rushes, 77 yards
- CIN – Jess Phillips – 11 rushes, 58 yards, TD

Top receivers

- KC – Otis Taylor – 6 receptions, 72 yards
- CIN – Bob Trumpy – 4 receptions, 100 yards, TD

=== Week 4 (Sunday, October 5, 1969): at Denver Broncos ===
Week 4: Kansas City Chiefs at Denver Broncos – Game summary

Quarter	1	2	3	4	Total
Chiefs	3	6	3	14	26
Broncos	0	3	0	10	13

at Mile High Stadium, Denver, Colorado

- Date: October 5
- Game time: 3:00 p.m. CDT
- Game weather: 55 °F (13 °C)
- Game attendance: 50,564
- Referee: Ben Dreith
- Recap

Game information

First quarter

- KC – Jan Stenerud 20-yard field goal. Chiefs 3–0.

Second quarter

- DEN – Bobby Howfield 13-yard field goal. Tied 3–3.
- KC – Jan Stenerud 12-yard field goal. Chiefs 6–3.
- KC – Jan Stenerud 54-yard field goal. Chiefs 9–3.

Third quarter

- KC – Jan Stenerud 11-yard field goal. Chiefs 12–3.

Fourth quarter

- KC – Warren McVea 12-yard run (Jan Stenerud kick). Chiefs 19–3.
- KC – Jim Kearney 60-yard interception return (Jan Stenerud kick). Chiefs 26–3.
- DEN – Bobby Howfield 47-yard field goal. Chiefs 26–6.
- DEN – Al Denson 22-yard pass from Pete Liske (Bobby Howfield kick). Chiefs 26–13.

Top passers

- KC – Mike Livingston – 14/27, 214 yards
- DEN – Pete Liske – 13/22, 149 yards, TD, INT

Top rushers

- KC – Mike Garrett – 13 rushes, 67 yards
- DEN – Floyd Little – 13 rushes, 63 yards

Top receivers

- KC – Otis Taylor – 3 receptions, 71 yards
- DEN – Floyd Little – 8 receptions, 70 yards

=== Week 5 (Sunday, October 12, 1969): vs. Houston Oilers ===
Week 5: Houston Oilers at Kansas City Chiefs – Game summary

Quarter	1	2	3	4	Total
Oilers	0	0	0	0	0
Chiefs	14	10	0	0	24

at Municipal Stadium, Kansas City, Missouri

- Date: October 12
- Game time: 3:00 p.m. CDT
- Game weather: 56 °F (13 °C)
- Game attendance: 45,805
- Referee: Jack Reader
- TV announcers (NBC): Bill Enis and Elmer Angsman
- Recap

Game information

First quarter

- KC – Mike Garrett 2-yard run (Jan Stenerud kick). Chiefs 7–0.
- KC – George Daney 5-yard fumble return (Jan Stenerud kick). Chiefs 14–0.

Second quarter

- KC – Jan Stenerud 30-yard field goal. Chiefs 17–0.
- KC – Robert Holmes 33-yard pass from Tom Flores (Jan Stenerud kick). Chiefs 24–0.

Third quarter

- No scoring plays.

Fourth quarter

- No scoring plays.

Top passers

- HOU – Pete Beathard – 10/35, 110 yards, 5 INT
- KC – Mike Livingston – 8/15, 61 yards, INT

Top rushers

- HOU – Hoyle Granger – 14 rushes, 21 yards
- KC – Warren McVea – 10 rushes, 67 yards

Top receivers

- HOU – Jim Beirne – 4 receptions, 47 yards
- KC – Robert Holmes – 4 receptions, 58 yards, TD

=== Week 6 (Sunday, October 19, 1969): vs. Miami Dolphins ===
Week 6: Miami Dolphins at Kansas City Chiefs – Game summary

Quarter	1	2	3	4	Total
Dolphins	0	0	3	7	10
Chiefs	7	10	0	0	17

at Municipal Stadium, Kansas City, Missouri

- Date: October 19
- Game time: 12:30 p.m. CDT
- Game weather: 58 °F (14 °C)
- Game attendance: 49,809
- Referee: Bob Finley
- TV announcers (NBC): Jim Simpson and Al DeRogatis
- Recap

Game information

First quarter

- KC – Robert Holmes 14-yard pass from Mike Livingston (Jan Stenerud kick). Chiefs 7–0.

Second quarter

- KC – Mike Garrett 9-yard run (Jan Stenerud kick). Chiefs 14–0.
- KC – Jan Stenerud 44-yard field goal. Chiefs 17–0.

Third quarter

- MIA – Karl Kremser 37-yard field goal. Chiefs 17–3.

Fourth quarter

- MIA – Mercury Morris 9-yard run (Karl Kremser kick). Chiefs 17–10.

Top passers

- MIA – Bob Griese – 21/45, 192 yards, 3 INT
- KC – Mike Livingston – 17/34, 308 yards, TD, INT

Top rushers

- MIA – Larry Csonka – 10 rushes, 31 yards
- KC – Warren McVea – 9 rushes, 38 yards

Top receivers

- MIA – Larry Seiple – 6 receptions, 71 yards
- KC – Otis Taylor – 4 receptions, 131 yards

=== Week 7 (Sunday, October 26, 1969): vs. Cincinnati Bengals ===
Week 7: Cincinnati Bengals at Kansas City Chiefs – Game summary

Quarter	1	2	3	4	Total
Bengals	0	12	7	3	22
Chiefs	7	14	7	14	42

at Municipal Stadium, Kansas City, Missouri

- Date: October 26
- Game time: 3:00 p.m. CST
- Game weather: 53 °F (12 °C)
- Game attendance: 50,934
- Referee: Ben Dreith
- TV announcers (NBC): Jay Randolph and Elmer Angsman
- Recap

Game information

First quarter

- KC – Wendell Hayes 4-yard run (Jan Stenerud kick). Chiefs 7–0.

Second quarter

- CIN – Horst Mühlmann 35-yard field goal. Chiefs 7–3.
- KC – Robert Holmes 27-yard pass from Mike Livingston (Jan Stenerud kick). Chiefs 14–3.
- CIN – Bob Trumpy 59-yard pass from Sam Wyche (Horst Mühlmann kick). Chiefs 14–10.
- CIN – KC fumble recovery endzone for a Safety. Chiefs 14–12.
- KC – Gloster Richardson 10-yard pass from Mike Livingston (Jan Stenerud kick). Chiefs 21–12.

Third quarter

- KC – Mike Garrett 10-yard pass from Mike Livingston (Jan Stenerud kick). Chiefs 28–12.
- CIN – Harry Gunner 70-yard interception return (Horst Mühlmann kick). Chiefs 28–19.

Fourth quarter

- CIN – Horst Mühlmann 27-yard field goal. Chiefs 28–22.
- KC – Warren McVea 80-yard run (Jan Stenerud kick). Chiefs 35–22.
- KC – Goldie Sellers 21-yard special teams fumble return (Jan Stenerud kick). Chiefs 42–22.

Top passers

- CIN – Sam Wyche – 11/21, 154 yards, TD
- KC – Mike Livingston – 15/25, 208 yards, 3 TD, 2 INT

Top rushers

- CIN – Sam Wyche – 3 rushes, 32 yards
- KC – Warren McVea – 17 rushes, 141 yards, TD

Top receivers

- CIN – Bob Trumpy – 3 receptions, 74 yards, TD
- KC – Mike Garrett – 5 receptions, 101 yards, TD

=== Week 8 (Sunday, November 2, 1969): at Buffalo Bills ===
Week 8: Kansas City Chiefs at Buffalo Bills – Game summary

Quarter	1	2	3	4	Total
Chiefs	0	3	3	23	29
Bills	7	0	0	0	7

at War Memorial Stadium, Buffalo, New York

- Date: November 2
- Game time: 12:30 p.m. CST
- Game weather: 57 °F (14 °C)
- Game attendance: 45,844
- Referee: Jack Vest
- TV announcers (NBC): Jim Simpson and Al DeRogatis
- Recap

Game information

First quarter

- BUF – Marlin Briscoe 14-yard pass from Dan Darragh (Bruce Alford kick). Bills 7–0.

Second quarter

- KC – Jan Stenerud 47-yard field goal. Bills 7–3.

Third quarter

- KC – Jan Stenerud 34-yard field goal. Bills 7–6.

Fourth quarter

- KC – Jan Stenerud 37-yard field goal. Chiefs 9–7.
- KC – Jan Stenerud 44-yard field goal. Chiefs 12–7.
- KC – Jan Stenerud 18-yard field goal. Chiefs 15–7.
- KC – Mike Garrett 34-yard run (Jan Stenerud kick). Chiefs 22–7.
- KC – Mike Garrett 5-yard run (Jan Stenerud kick). Chiefs 29–7.

Top passers

- KC – Len Dawson – 7/14, 94 yards
- BUF – Dan Darragh – 10/25, 132 yards, TD, 4 INT

Top rushers

- KC – Mike Garrett – 14 rushes, 71 yards, 2 TD
- BUF – Wayne Patrick – 12 rushes, 66 yards

Top receivers

- KC – Frank Pitts – 4 receptions, 70 yards
- BUF – Haven Moses – 2 receptions, 43 yards

=== Week 9 (Sunday, November 9, 1969): vs. San Diego Chargers ===
Week 9: San Diego Chargers at Kansas City Chiefs – Game summary

Quarter	1	2	3	4	Total
Chargers	3	0	0	0	3
Chiefs	0	10	10	7	27

at Municipal Stadium, Kansas City, Missouri

- Date: November 9
- Game time: 3:00 p.m. CST
- Game weather: 57 °F (14 °C)
- Game attendance: 51,982
- Referee: Bob Finley
- TV announcers (NBC): Curt Gowdy and Al DeRogatis
- Recap

Game information

First quarter

- SD – Dennis Partee 25-yard field goal. Chargers 3–0.

Second quarter

- KC – Mike Garrett 5-yard run (Jan Stenerud kick). Chiefs 7–3.
- KC – Jan Stenerud 30-yard field goal. Chiefs 10–3.

Third quarter

- KC – Jan Stenerud 47-yard field goal. Chiefs 13–3.
- KC – Frank Pitts 50-yard pass from Warren McVea (Jan Stenerud kick). Chiefs 20–3.

Fourth quarter

- KC – Warren McVea 2-yard run (Jan Stenerud kick). Chiefs 27–3.

Top passers

- SD – Marty Domres – 10/32, 132 yards, 5 INT
- KC – Len Dawson – 17/24, 169 yards, 3 INT

Top rushers

- SD – Russ Smith – 8 rushes, 30 yards
- KC – Mike Garrett – 9 rushes, 46 yards, TD

Top receivers

- SD – Rick Eber – 3 receptions, 66 yards
- KC – Frank Pitts – 4 receptions, 99 yards, TD

=== Week 10 (Sunday, November 16, 1969): at New York Jets ===
Week 10: Kansas City Chiefs at New York Jets – Game summary

Quarter	1	2	3	4	Total
Chiefs	10	10	7	7	34
Jets	3	7	0	6	16

at Shea Stadium, New York, New York

- Date: November 16
- Game time: 12:30 p.m. CST
- Game weather: 35 °F (2 °C)
- Game attendance: 63,849
- Referee: Ben Dreith
- TV announcers (NBC): Curt Gowdy and Kyle Rote
- Recap

Game information

First quarter

- KC – Otis Taylor 18-yard pass from Len Dawson (Jan Stenerud kick). Chiefs 7–0.
- KC – Jan Stenerud 21-yard field goal. Chiefs 10–0.
- NYJ – Jim Turner 10-yard field goal. Chiefs 10–3.

Second quarter

- NYJ – George Sauer 40-yard pass from Joe Namath (Jim Turner kick). Tied 10–10.
- KC – Otis Taylor 7-yard pass from Len Dawson (Jan Stenerud kick). Chiefs 17–10.
- KC – Jan Stenerud 38-yard field goal. Chiefs 20–10.

Third quarter

- KC – Warren McVea 2-yard run (Jan Stenerud kick). Chiefs 27–10.

Fourth quarter

- KC – Otis Taylor 10-yard pass from Len Dawson (Jan Stenerud kick). Chiefs 34–10.
- NYJ – Don Maynard 10-yard pass from Joe Namath (run failed). Chiefs 34–16.

Top passers

- KC – Len Dawson – 23/38, 285 yards, 3 TD, INT
- NYJ – Joe Namath – 24/40, 327 yards, 2 TD, 3 INT

Top rushers

- KC – Warren McVea – 15 rushes, 102 yards, TD
- NYJ – Emerson Boozer – 6 rushes, 45 yards

Top receivers

- KC – Otis Taylor – 7 receptions, 96 yards, 3 TD
- NYJ – Don Maynard – 9 receptions, 137 yards, TD

=== Week 11 (Sunday, November 23, 1969): vs. Oakland Raiders ===
Week 11: Oakland Raiders at Kansas City Chiefs – Game summary

Quarter	1	2	3	4	Total
Raiders	3	14	10	0	27
Chiefs	7	10	0	7	24

at Municipal Stadium, Kansas City, Missouri

- Date: November 23
- Game time: 3:00 p.m. CST
- Game weather: 47 °F (8 °C)
- Game attendance: 51,982
- Referee: John McDonough
- TV announcers (NBC): Curt Gowdy and Kyle Rote
- Recap

Game information

First quarter

- OAK – George Blanda 10-yard field goal. Raiders 3–0.
- KC – Warren McVea 5-yard run (Jan Stenerud kick). Chiefs 7–3.

Second quarter

- KC – Otis Taylor 31-yard pass from Len Dawson (Jan Stenerud kick). Chiefs 14–3.
- OAK – George Atkinson 22-yard interception return (George Blanda kick). Chiefs 14–10.
- KC – Jan Stenerud 14-yard field goal. Chiefs 17–10.
- OAK – Warren Wells 22-yard pass from Daryle Lamonica (Geoge Blanda kick). Tied 17–17.

Third quarter

- OAK – George Blanda 14-yard field goal. Raiders 20–17.
- OAK – Dan Conners 75-yard interception return (George Blanda kick). Raiders 27–17.

Fourth quarter

- KC – Frank Pitts 42-yard pass from Len Dawson (Jan Stenerud kick). Raiders 27–24.

Top passers

- OAK – Daryle Lamonica – 9/24, 142 yards, TD
- KC – Len Dawson – 13/24, 269 yards, 2 TD, 5 INT

Top rushers

- OAK – Hewritt Dixon – 16 rushes, 82 yards
- KC – Robert Holmes – 14 rushes, 80 yards

Top receivers

- OAK – Warren Wells – 3 receptions, 59 yards, TD
- KC – Otis Taylor – 6 receptions, 103 yards, TD

=== Week 12 (Thursday, November 27, 1969): vs. Denver Broncos ===
Thanksgiving Day games

Week 12: Denver Broncos at Kansas City Chiefs – Game summary

Quarter	1	2	3	4	Total
Broncos	0	3	0	14	17
Chiefs	3	14	0	14	31

at Municipal Stadium, Kansas City, Missouri

- Date: November 27
- Game time: 12:30 p.m. CST
- Game weather: 38 °F (3 °C)
- Game attendance: 48,773
- Referee: Jack Reader
- TV announcers (NBC): Charlie Jones and Elmer Angsman
- Recap

Game information

First quarter

- KC – Jan Stenerud 16-yard field goal. Chiefs 3–0.

Second quarter

- KC – Warren McVea 1-yard run (Jan Stenerud kick). Chiefs 10–0.
- DEN – Bobby Howfield 42-yard field goal. Chiefs 10–3.
- KC – Warren McVea 1-yard run (Jan Stenerud kick). Chiefs 17–3.

Third quarter

- No scoring plays.

Fourth quarter

- KC – Emmitt Thomas 45-yard interception return (Jan Stenerud kick). Chiefs 24–3.
- DEN – Fran Lynch 1-yard run (Bobby Howfield kick). Chiefs 24–10.
- DEN – Wandy Williams 1-yard run (Bobby Howfield kick). Chiefs 24–17.
- KC – Bobby Bell 53-yard kickoff return (Jan Stenerud kick). Chiefs 31–17.

Top passers

- DEN – Steve Tensi – 12/33, 179 yards, 2 INT
- KC – Len Dawson – 5/6, 95 yards

Top rushers

- DEN – Fran Lynch – 12 rushes, 65 yards, TD
- KC – Mike Garrett – 20 rushes, 88 yards

Top receivers

- DEN – John Embree – 3 receptions, 72 yards
- KC – Fred Arbanas – 2 receptions, 67 yards

=== Week 13 (Sunday, December 7, 1969): vs. Buffalo Bills ===
Week 13: Buffalo Bills at Kansas City Chiefs – Game summary

Quarter	1	2	3	4	Total
Bills	3	3	10	6	22
Chiefs	7	6	3	6	22

at Municipal Stadium, Kansas City, Missouri

- Date: December 7
- Game time: 3:00 p.m. CST
- Game weather: 34 °F (1 °C)
- Game attendance: 47,112
- Referee: Jack Vest
- TV announcers (NBC): Curt Gowdy and Kyle Rote
- Recap

Game information

First quarter

- BUF – Bruce Alford 16-yard field goal. Bills 3–0.
- KC – Robert Holmes 1-yard run (Jan Stenerud kick). Chiefs 7–3.

Second quarter

- KC – Jan Stenerud 52-yard field goal. Chiefs 10–3.
- KC – Jan Stenerud 8-yard field goal. Chiefs 13–3.

Third quarter

- BUF – Bruce Alford 34-yard field goal. Chiefs 13–6.
- KC – Jan Stenerud 47-yard field goal. Chiefs 16–6.
- BUF – Marlin Briscoe 17-yard pass from Jack Kemp (Bruce Alford kick). Chiefs 16–13.

Fourth quarter

- KC – Jan Stenerud 20-yard field goal. Chiefs 19–13.
- BUF – O. J. Simpson 32-yard run (pass failed). Tied 19–19.
- KC – Jan Stenerud 25-yard field goal. Chiefs 22–19.

Top passers

- BUF – Jack Kemp – 18/32, 165 yards, TD
- KC – Mike Livingston – 13/23, 142 yards

Top rushers

- BUF – O. J. Simpson – 11 rushes, 62 yards, TD
- KC – Mike Garrett – 18 rushes, 67 yards

Top receivers

- BUF – Bobby Crockett – 4 receptions, 50 yards
- KC – Mike Garrett – 4 receptions, 43 yards

=== Week 14 (Saturday, December 13, 1969): at Oakland Raiders ===
Week 14: Kansas City Chiefs at Oakland Raiders – Game summary

Quarter	1	2	3	4	Total
Chiefs	0	0	0	6	6
Raiders	0	3	0	7	10

at Oakland–Alameda County Coliseum, Oakland, California

- Date: December 13
- Game time: 3:00 p.m. CST
- Game weather: 55 °F (13 °C)
- Game attendance: 54,443
- Referee: Jack Reader
- TV announcers (NBC): Curt Gowdy and Kyle Rote
- Recap

Game information

First quarter

- No scoring plays.

Second quarter

- OAK – George Blanda 30-yard field goal. Raiders 3–0.

Third quarter

- No scoring plays.

Fourth quarter

- OAK – Charlie Smith 8-yard pass from Daryle Lamonica (George Blanda kick). Raiders 10–0.
- KC – Wendell Hayes 1-yard run (run failed). Raiders 10–6.

Top passers

- KC – Len Dawson – 2/6, 47 yards
- OAK – Daryle Lamonica – 11/20, 188 yards, TD, 2 INT

Top rushers

- KC – Mike Garrett – 15 rushes, 71 yards
- OAK – Marv Hubbard – 6 rushes, 39 yards

Top receivers

- KC – Robert Holmes – 2 receptions, 47 yards
- OAK – Warren Wells – 1 reception, 72 yards

=== Standings ===
AFL Western Division
	W	L	T	PCT	DIV	PF	PA	STK
Oakland Raiders	12	1	1	.923	7–1	377	242	W6
Kansas City Chiefs	11	3	0	.786	5–3	359	177	L1
San Diego Chargers	8	6	0	.571	2–6	288	276	W4
Denver Broncos	5	8	1	.385	3–5	297	344	W1
Cincinnati Bengals	4	9	1	.308	3–5	280	367	L5

Note: Tie games were not officially counted in the standings of the AFL.

== Postseason ==
=== Schedule ===
Round	Date	Opponent	Result	Record	Venue	Attendance	Recap
Divisional	December 20	at New York Jets	W 13–6	1–0	Shea Stadium	62,977	Recap
AFL Championship	January 4	at Oakland Raiders	W 17–7	2–0	Oakland–Alameda County Coliseum	53,564	Recap
Super Bowl IV	January 11	vs. Minnesota Vikings	W 23–7	3–0	Tulane Stadium	80,562	Recap

== Playoff game summaries ==
=== 1969 American Football League Divisional Playoffs (Saturday, December 20, 1969): at New York Jets ===
AFL Divisional Playoffs: Kansas City Chiefs at New York Jets – Game summary

Quarter	1	2	3	4	Total
Chiefs	0	3	3	7	13
Jets	3	0	0	3	6

at Shea Stadium, New York, New York

- Date: December 20
- Game time: 12:30 p.m. CST
- Game weather: 33 °F (1 °C)
- Game attendance: 62,977
- Referee: Jack Reader
- TV announcers (NBC): Curt Gowdy and Kyle Rote
- Recap

Game information

First quarter

- NYJ – Jim Turner 27-yard field goal. Jets 3–0.

Second quarter

- KC – Jan Stenerud 23-yard field goal. Tied 3–3.

Third quarter

- KC – Jan Stenerud 25-yard field goal. Chiefs 6–3.

Fourth quarter

- NYJ – Jim Turner 7-yard field goal. Tied 6–6.
- KC – Gloster Richardson 19-yard pass from Len Dawson (Jan Stenerud kick). Chiefs 13–6.

Top passers

- KC – Len Dawson – 12/27, 201 yards, TD
- NYJ – Joe Namath – 14/40, 169 yards, 3 INT

Top rushers

- KC – Mike Garrett – 18 rushes, 67 yards
- NYJ – Matt Snell – 12 rushes, 61 yards

Top receivers

- KC – Otis Taylor – 2 receptions, 74 yards
- NYJ – George Sauer – 5 receptions, 66 yards

In the 1969 AFL Divisional Playoff Game at the New York Jets (12/20), Kansas City rode its dominating defense which produced a crucial goal-line stand en route to a 13–6 win over the defending Super Bowl champions to set up a rematch with the Raiders in the final AFL Championship Game.

Chiefs went to the AFL Championship to the Oakland Raiders and win 17-7. And win Super Bowl IV to the Minnesota Vikings 23-7.

=== 1969 American Football League Championship Game (Sunday, January 4, 1970): at Oakland Raiders ===
AFL Championship Game: Kansas City Chiefs at Oakland Raiders – Game summary

Quarter	1	2	3	4	Total
Chiefs	0	7	7	3	17
Raiders	7	0	0	0	7

at Oakland–Alameda County Coliseum, Oakland, California

- Date: January 4
- Game time: 3:00 p.m. CST
- Game weather: 45 °F (7 °C)
- Game attendance: 54,443
- Referee: Jack Vest
- TV announcers (NBC): Curt Gowdy and Kyle Rote
- Recap

Game information

First quarter

- OAK – Charlie Smith 3-yard run (George Blanda kick). Raiders 7–0.

Second quarter

- KC – Wendell Hayes 1-yard run (Jan Stenerud kick). Tied 7–7.

Third quarter

- KC – Robert Holmes 5-yard run (Jan Stenerud kick). Chiefs 14–7.

Fourth quarter

- KC – Jan Stenerud 22-yard field goal. Chiefs 17–7.

Top passers

- KC – Len Dawson – 7/17, 129 yards
- OAK – Daryle Lamonica – 15/39, 167 yards, 3 INT

Top rushers

- KC – Wendell Hayes – 8 rushes, 35 yards, TD
- OAK – Hewritt Dixon – 12 rushes, 36 yards

Top receivers

- KC – Otis Taylor – 3 receptions, 62 yards
- OAK – Charlie Smith – 8 receptions, 86 yards

The Kansas City Chiefs won the last championship of the AFL, 17–7, by slowing down the Oakland passing attack and capitalizing on big plays. The Raiders looked on their way to their third win of the year against Kansas City when Charlie Smith scored on a three-yard run in the first quarter. But then, Len Dawson who had thrown seven incompletions in a row, hit Frank Pitts for a 41-yard gain to the Raiders' 1. Three plays later, Wendell Hayes blasted in for the tying touchdown. Dawson again pulled out a big play with the game tied, 7–7, in the third quarter. Facing a third-and-14 at the Kansas City 2, Dawson scrambled out of trouble and fired a 35-yard pass to Otis Taylor. That play was the key to a 94-yard drive that culminated in a five-yard scoring run by Robert Holmes. The Chiefs turned the ball over inside their own 30 three times in the fourth quarter, but each time they intercepted Raider quarterback Daryle Lamonica, who was playing despite having severely jammed his throwing hand against the helmet of Aaron Brown early in the final period. Chiefs go to Super Bowl IV and win to the Minnesota Vikings 23-7.

=== Super Bowl IV (Sunday, January 11, 1970): vs. (NFL) Minnesota Vikings ===
Super Bowl IV: Minnesota Vikings vs. Kansas City Chiefs – Game summary

Quarter	1	2	3	4	Total
Vikings	0	0	7	0	7
Chiefs	3	13	7	0	23

at Tulane Stadium, New Orleans, Louisiana

- Date: January 11
- Game time: 2:30 p.m. CST
- Game weather: 55 °F (13 °C)
- Game attendance: 80,562
- Referee: John McDonough
- TV announcers (CBS): Jack Buck, Pat Summerall, Frank Gifford and Jack Whitaker
- Recap

Game information

First quarter

- KC – Jan Stenerud 48-yard field goal. Chiefs 3–0.

Second quarter

- KC – Jan Stenerud 32-yard field goal. Chiefs 6–0.
- KC – Jan Stenerud 25-yard field goal. Chiefs 9–0.
- KC – Mike Garrett 5-yard run (Jan Stenerud kick). Chiefs 16–0.

Third quarter

- MIN – Dave Osborn 4-yard run (Fred Cox kick). Chiefs 16–7.
- KC – Otis Taylor 46-yard pass from Len Dawson (Jan Stenerud kick). Chiefs 23–7.

Fourth quarter

- No scoring plays.

Top passers

- MIN – Joe Kapp – 16/25, 183 yards
- KC – Len Dawson – 12/17, 142 yards, TD

Top rushers

- MIN – Bill Brown – 6 rushes, 26 yards
- KC – Mike Garrett – 11 rushes, 39 yards, TD

Top receivers

- MIN – John Henderson – 7 receptions, 111 yards
- KC – Otis Taylor – 6 receptions, 81 yards, TD

The fourth annual AFL-NFL Championship Game, now officially known as the "Super Bowl", was played on January 11, 1970, at Tulane Stadium in New Orleans, Louisiana. The AFL champion Kansas City Chiefs defeated the NFL champion Minnesota Vikings, 23–7.

Even though the Vikings were 13-point favorites coming into the game, the Chiefs defense dominated the game by limiting the Minnesota offense to only 67 rushing yards, forcing 3 interceptions, and recovering 2 fumbles. The victory by the AFL evened the Super Bowl series with the NFL at two games apiece.

Kansas City's Len Dawson became the fourth consecutive winning quarterback to be named Super Bowl MVP. He completed 12 of 17 passes for 142 yards and one touchdown, with 1 interception. Dawson also recorded 3 rushing attempts for 11 yards.

The Vikings began the game by taking the opening kickoff and marching from their own 20-yard line to the Kansas City 39-yard line, but were forced to punt. The Chiefs then drove 42 yards in 8 plays to score on kicker Jan Stenerud's Super Bowl record 48-yard field goal. (According to Dawson, the Vikings were shocked that the Chiefs would attempt a 48-yard field goal. "Stenerud was a major factor", he said.) Minnesota then managed to reach midfield on their next drive, but were forced to punt again.

On the first play of their ensuing drive, Chiefs quarterback Len Dawson threw a 20-yard completion to wide receiver Frank Pitts, followed by a 9-yard pass to wide receiver Otis Taylor. Four plays later, on the first play of the second quarter, a pass interference penalty on Vikings defensive back Ed Sharockman nullified Dawson's third down incompletion and gave Kansas City a first down at the Minnesota 31-yard line. However, on third down and 4 at the 25-yard line, Vikings cornerback Earsell Mackbee broke up a deep pass intended for Taylor. Stenerud then kicked another field goal to increase the Chiefs lead to 6–0.

On the second play of their next drive, Vikings wide receiver John Henderson fumbled the ball after catching a 16-yard reception, and Chiefs defensive back Johnny Robinson recovered the ball at the Minnesota 46-yard line. But the Vikings made key defensive plays. First defensive tackle Alan Page tackled running back Mike Garrett for a 1-yard loss, and then safety Paul Krause intercepted Dawson's pass at the 7-yard line on the next play.

However, the Vikings also could not take advantage of the turnover. Quarterback Joe Kapp's two incompletions and a delay of game penalty forced Minnesota to punt from their own 5-yard line. The Chiefs then took over at the Viking 44-yard line after punter Bob Lee's kick only went 39 yards. A 19-yard run by Pitts on a reverse play then set up another field goal by Stenerud to increase the Chiefs' lead to 9–0.

On the ensuing kickoff, Vikings returner Charlie West fumbled the ball, and Kansas City's Remi Prudhomme recovered it at Minnesota 19-yard line. Defensive tackle Jim Marshall sacked Dawson for an 8-yard loss by on the first play of the drive, but then a 13-yard run by running back Wendell Hayes and a 10-yard reception by Taylor gave the Chiefs a first down at the 4-yard line. Two plays later, running back Mike Garrett's 5-yard touchdown run gave Kansas City a 16–0 lead. The play call was “65 Toss Power Trap”, which became a classic play call in NFL history. It was heard because head coach Hank Stram was wearing a microphone for NFL Films, making him the first person to ever do that.

West returned the ensuing kickoff 27 yards to the 32-yard line. Then on the first play of the drive, Kapp completed a 27-yard pass to Henderson to advance the ball to the Kansas City 41-yard line. However, on the next 3 plays, Kapp threw 2 incompletions and was sacked by defensive tackle Buck Buchanan for an 8-yard loss. Then on fourth down, kicker Fred Cox's 56-yard field goal attempt fell short of the goal posts.

In the third quarter, the Vikings managed to build some momentum. After forcing the Chiefs to punt on the opening possession of the second half, Minnesota drove 69 yards in 10 plays to score on fullback Dave Osborn's 4-yard rushing touchdown to cut the lead, 16–7. However, Kansas City responded on their next possession with a 6-play, 82-yard drive to score on Dawson's 46-yard touchdown completion to Taylor three minutes later.

The Chiefs would then go on to shut out the Vikings in the fourth quarter, forcing three interceptions on three Minnesota possessions, to clinch the 23–7 victory. The defeat was total for the Vikings, as even their "Indestructible" quarterback Joe Kapp had to be helped off the field in the fourth quarter after being sacked by Chiefs defensive lineman Aaron Brown.

Garrett was the top rusher of the game, recording 11 carries for 39 yards and a touchdown. He also caught 2 passes for 25 yards and returned a kickoff for 18 yards. Taylor was the Chiefs' leading receiver with 6 catches for 81 yards and a touchdown. Kapp finished the game with 16 of 25 completions for 183 yards, with 2 interceptions. Henderson was the top receiver of the game with 7 catches for 111 yards.

This was the last game where the winner was awarded the World Championship Game Trophy, as later that fall the trophy was renamed the Vince Lombardi Trophy due to Lombardi's death and the AFL-NFL Merger.

== Honors & Awards ==
=== AFL All-Star Game ===
The Chiefs sent nine players to the American Football League All-Star game to represent the AFL West.

- Bobby Bell
- Buck Buchanan
- Ed Budde
- Curley Culp
- Len Dawson
- Robert Holmes
- Willie Lanier
- Mike Livingston
- Jim Marsalis
- Jim Tyrer

Preceded by New York Jets; 1968	American Football League champion 1969	Succeeded by Final champion
