= Wendell Hayes =

American football player (1940–2019)

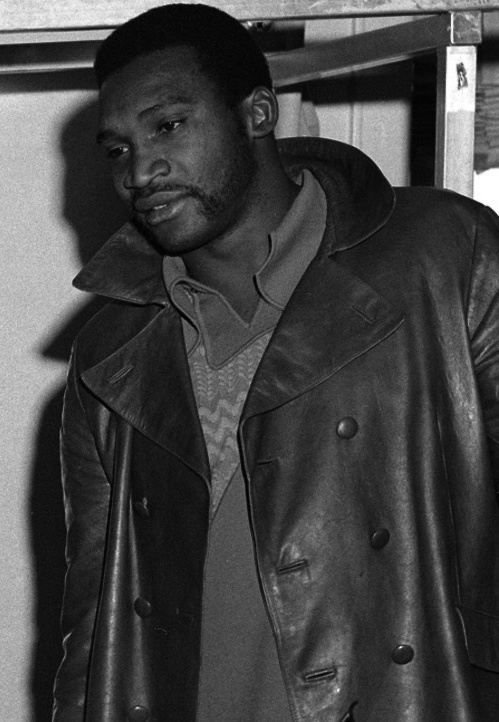
- Hayes visits patients at Fitzsimons Army Medical Center

No. 33, 29, 38
- Position: Running back

Personal information
- Born: August 5, 1940; Dallas, Texas, U.S.
- Died: December 28, 2019 (aged 79); Oakland, California, U.S.
- Listed height: 6 ft 1 in (1.85 m)
- Listed weight: 220 lb (100 kg)

Career information
- High school: McClymonds (Oakland)
- College: Humboldt State
- NFL draft: 1963: undrafted

Career history
- Dallas Cowboys (1963); Denver Broncos (1964)*; Oakland Raiders (1964)*; Denver Broncos (1965–1967); Kansas City Chiefs (1968-1974)
- * Offseason or practice squad member only

Awards and highlights
- Super Bowl champion (IV); AFL champion (1969)

Career NFL/AFL statistics
- Rushing yards: 3,758
- Rushing average: 3.8
- Receptions: 161
- Receiving yards: 1,461
- Touchdowns: 35
- Stats at Pro Football Reference

Wendell Hayes (August 5, 1940 - December 28, 2019) was an American professional football running back. He played college football at Oakland City College and Humboldt State University. Hayes played in the National Football League (NFL) for the Dallas Cowboys (1963) and Kansas City Chiefs (1970 to 1974), and in the American Football League for the Denver Broncos (1965 to 1967) and the Chiefs (1968 to 1969). He played on the 1969 Chiefs team that won the 1969 AFL championship and then defeated the Minnesota Vikings in the fourth and final AFL-NFL World Championship Game.

== Early life ==
Hayes was born on August 5, 1940, in Dallas, Texas. His family moved to Oakland, California where he attended Hoover Junior High School (graduating in June 1956), and then McClymonds High School.

At McClymonds, he became a multi-sport athlete. Hayes was a fullback on McClymonds' varsity football team. In 1957, he was honorable mention All-City at fullback. In 1958, he was named second-team All-City at fullback. He was mentored by head coach Earl Meneweather, who became the Oakland Athletic League's (OAL) first African American high school head football coach in 1957. Meneweather had played football at Humboldt State University (where Hayes would ultimately attend college), and was the first person inducted into its Athletics Hall of Fame in 1955. It has also been stated that Meneweather was the first black high school head football coach in California.

Hayes also played starting forward on McClymonds' 1959 championship basketball team that included, among others, future National Basketball Association star Paul Silas and future Major League Baseball player Aaron Pointer. Hayes was honorable mention All-City that season; with the other four McClymonds' starters named first-team All-City. McClymonds' basketball team was undefeated in the 1958–59 season, under coach Paul Harless, and won the Tournament of Champions title in March 1959.

Hayes ran the 100-yard dash and threw the shot put on McClymonds' track and field team. He was the Oakland Athletic League's shot put champion in May 1959. He received All-Oakland Athletic League honors in track.

As a teenager, he was also an amateur boxer.

== College career ==
In the fall of 1959, Hayes entered Oakland City College (formerly Oakland Junior College), where he was a fullback on the football team for two seasons. Oakland City College was part of the Big Eight Conference. He was the team's second leading rusher in 1959. Hayes was twice All-Big Eight in football, and was named to the first-team Big Eight Conference All-Star Team in 1960. Hayes also played forward and guard for Oakland City College’s basketball team during the team's 1959–60 and 1960–61 seasons. He was one of the conference's top scorers in 1960.

After playing two seasons of football at Oakland City College, Hayes later attended Humboldt State College. At Humboldt, as a junior, he became the left halfback on the school's football team in 1962, playing in the Far Western Conference. He also played defense and was the team's placekicker. Hayes was expected to be one of Humboldt's leading football players in the 1963 season, but he lost his scholarship eligibility and did not play another season at Humboldt.

Hayes also was on Humboldt's basketball team, playing forward. He was the team's leading scorer, and considered its most outstanding player. In a mid-December 1962 game against Southern Oregon, he had 25 points and 16 rebounds. As a junior in the 1962–63 season, Hayes led the Far Western Conference in rebounding and was selected as a first-team conference All-Star. Hayes was also on Humboldt's track team, and set a school record in the shot put.

== Professional career ==
=== Dallas Cowboys ===
Hayes signed as an undrafted free agent with the Dallas Cowboys of the National Football League (NFL) in late June 1963, after losing his scholarship at Humboldt. He was the first Humboldt player to sign an NFL contract. He performed well in training camp, and by early August had surpassed running back Amos Bullocks as the backup to the Cowboy's rushing leader, Don Perkins. In late August 1963, Hayes required left leg surgery to remove calcium deposits, and Cowboys' head coach Tom Landry expected that Hayes would miss the entire 1963 season. It has been reported he played on the Cowboys' taxi squad during 1963. Hayes did come back to appear in one game for the Cowboys that season, returning two kickoffs in the last game of the season.

He returned to the Cowboys' training camp in 1964, but was waived on August 30, 1964, one of the final two players that the Cowboys cut before the 1964 season. It was reported that coach Landry waived Hayes after Hayes failed to report into a game for his blocking assignment on a field goal attempt, resulting in a blocked kick late in the preseason.

=== Denver Broncos and Oakland Raiders ===
After being released by the Cowboys, Hayes signed with the Denver Broncos of the American Football League (AFL) in 1964, but was released before the start of the season. The AFL's Oakland Raiders signed him to their taxi squad in 1964, before being cut in December. Hayes also played semipro football with the Oakland Gladiators in 1964. Denver brought Hayes back at the end of the 1964, but Denver coach Mac Speedie was unimpressed at the time and did not use Hayes on the team.

The Denver Broncos signed Hayes before the 1965 season, though coach Speedie apparently was unaware the team had done so, and expected that Hayes would be cut during training camp. Instead, Hayes played well enough in training camp to make the 1965 Broncos team. The Broncos considered him a rookie. Early season injuries to running backs Abner Haynes and Charley Mitchell opened up Hayes's opportunities to play more that season.

As a reserve running back in the 1965 season's first game, he rushed four times for 35 yards, including a 21-yard run; and caught two passes for nine yards. After that, he became the team's starting halfback for the remainder of the season, next to Cookie Gilchrist at fullback. In the season's third game, a 27–10 victory over the Boston Patriots, Hayes carried the ball 14 times for 81 yards, with two touchdowns and a long run of 30 yards. Overall that season, Hayes started 13 games, with 526 rushing yards on 130 carries and five rushing touchdowns; second on the team to Gilchrist in each of those categories. Hayes also had 24 receptions for 294 yards and two receiving touchdowns. Hayes finished the season 10th in the AFL in rushing yards, tied for fifth in rushing touchdowns, and tied for ninth in yards per carry.

In early August 1966, Gilchrist unexpectedly announced he was leaving the Broncos. The Broncos stated that if Gilchrist did retire, Hayes could ably fill the role as the Broncos' fullback. The Broncos immediately placed Gilchrist on their reserve list, eventually waiving him in October; after which he was acquired by the Miami Dolphins. Hayes was the Broncos starting fullback for 10 of the 11 games in which he appeared in 1966. He missed time with a broken collarbone, suffered on the first play of the season's seventh game against the Kansas City Chiefs when he was tackled by future teammate Buck Buchanan at the end of a 14-yard run. On the season, Hayes rushed for a team-leading 417 yards on 105 carries.

Future Hall of Fame running back Floyd Little joined the Broncos as a rookie in 1967, and became the team's leading rusher. Gilchrest returned to the Broncos, now coached by Lou Saban (Gilchrest's former coach in Buffalo), and started the first game of the season over Hayes, but suffered a season ending injury. Hayes became the starting fullback again in the Bronco's second game, but as the season progressed Charley Mitchell was teamed with Little, receiving playing time over Hayes. Gilchrest had been replaced on the roster by rookie fullback Bo Hickey, who also started five games at fullback that season. Hayes only started seven games in 1967, with 85 carries for 255 yards and four touchdowns; along with 13 receptions for 125 yards.

On January 19, 1968, Hayes was traded along with Goldie Sellers and a player to be named later to the Kansas City Chiefs, in exchange for third and fourth round 1968 draft choices, who turned out to be Bob Vaughan with the 75th overall selection and Drake Garrett with the 102nd overall selection. Hayes and Sellers had fallen into disfavor with Broncos' head coach Lou Saban.

During his three years with the Broncos, Hayes started 30 games, rushing for 1,198 yards on 320 carries with 10 rushing touchdowns. He also had 45 receptions for 468 yards and two receiving touchdowns.

=== Kansas City Chiefs ===
Hayes served military duty in the summer before the 1968 Chiefs' training camp. He was the Chiefs' starting fullback in the season's first game, a 26–21 win over the Houston Oilers. Hayes led the team in rushing attempts (22), rushing yards (61), receptions (5) and receiving yards (38), while also scoring the Chiefs first touchdown of the season. He suffered a number of injuries during the season, and was placed on the injured reserve list on October 31, 1968.

During the 1968 season, he started four games of the 11 in which he appeared, with 340 yards on 85 carries and four rushing touchdowns. Hayes also had 12 receptions for 108 yards and one receiving touchdown. In an October 7 game against the Oakland Raiders, Hayes started in a three-back backfield with Mike Garrett and Robert Holmes, rushing for 89 yards on 14 carries, with two touchdowns. The three backs rushed for a combined 293 yards in that game. The Chiefs led the AFL in rushing that season. The Chiefs lost to the Raiders in the divisional round of the 1968 AFL playoffs; with Hayes having three carries for 10 yards.

In 1969, Hayes was a reserve running back behind Garrett and Holmes, with halfback Warren McVea also seeing considerable playing time (106 carries for 500 yards). Hayes did not start any games. He had 62 carries for 208 yards and four rushing touchdowns; along with nine receptions for 64 yards. He also returned two kickoffs for 81 yards (with a 45-yard return). The Chiefs led the AFL in rushing yards again.

The Chiefs went on to win the Super Bowl that season, with Hayes involved in every playoff game. The Chiefs defeated the New York Jets in the divisional round of the 1969 AFL playoffs, 13–7. Hayes had 10 rushes for 32 yards, and five receptions for 46 yards in that game. The Chiefs defeated Oakland 17–7 to win the 1969 AFL championship game, with Hayes scoring the Chiefs' first touchdown in the game, while rushing for 35 yards on eight carries. The Chiefs then beat the Minnesota Vikings 23–7 in Super Bowl IV (still officially known as the AFL-NFL Championship Game at the time). Hayes had 31 rushing yards on eight carries, and one reception for three yards in the Super Bowl.

The AFL-NFL merger was complete by the 1970 season, and this was now Hayes second season with an NFL team, after playing from 1965 to 1969 in the AFL. Before the 1970 season began, it was anticipated that Mike Garrett would be the Chiefs starting halfback and Robert Holmes the starting fullback. Garrett was traded after three games, and Ed Pololak became the team's leading rusher that season, at halfback. Hayes won the fullback job and started all 14 games, with 381 yards in 109 carries and five touchdowns that season. He also had 26 receptions for 219 yards. Hayes was second on the team in rushing attempts and yards, and tied for second with Podolak in number of receptions. Holmes appeared in all 14 games as a reserve, with 63 carries for 206 yards and 23 receptions.

Hayes was the Chiefs starting fullback in all 14 games in 1971, rushing for 537 yards on 132 carries with 16 receptions for 150 yards. He had a receiving and rushing touchdown. He was again second in rushing yards and attempts behind Podolak on the Chiefs. Holmes was traded at the end of October. The Chiefs lost in the divisional round of the 1971–72 NFL playoffs to the Miami Dolphins, 27–24. Hayes had 100 yards on 22 carries in that game, and three receptions. His 100 yards rushing was a team playoff game record until broken by Barry Word in December 1991.

The following season (1972) Hayes started 12 games as the Chiefs' fullback, with 536 yards on 128 carries; and career-highs of 31 pass receptions, 295 receiving yards, and three receiving touchdowns. The Chiefs acquired fullback Willie Ellison before the 1973 season. Hayes started the season's first game, with three carries and three receptions for 16 total yards. Ellison started the second and third games, suffering a shoulder injury early in the third game against the Oakland Raiders. Although he had his knee drained prior to that game Hayes filled in for Ellison, rushing for 83 yards on 21 carries with three receptions. During the 1973 season, Hayes and Ellison each started seven games at fullback. Hayes had 95 carries for 352 yards and two rushing touchdowns, with 18 receptions for 134 yards. Ellison had 411 yards on 108 carries with two touchdowns, and nine receptions.

The Chiefs selected fullback Woody Green with their first selection in the 1974 NFL draft. Hayes started the first two games of the 1974 season at fullback, sharing time with Ellison; totaling 15 carries for 91 yards in the two games. He suffered from injured ribs throughout the season, and started only six games in total, with 57 carries for 206 yards and four receptions on the season. This was Hayes lowest production of his 10-year career with the Broncos and Chiefs. Green started seven games that season, and led the team in rushing yards and attempts.

The Chiefs waived the 34-year old Hayes on April 19, 1975. The development of younger running backs, including Cleophus Miller who was expected to start at fullback in 1975, and the need to rebuild the team were factors in the Chiefs decision to waive Hayes, who would turn 35 before the season started.

During his seven years with the Chiefs (1968 and 1969 in the AFL, and 1970 to 1974 in the NFL), Hayes started 57 games. He rushed for 2,560 yards on 668 carries, with 18 rushing touchdowns. He also had 116 receptions for 993 yards and five receiving touchdowns. He was nicknamed "King" and was known for a highly competitive nature and his blocking abilities, as well as his rushing and receiving skills.

=== Detroit Lions ===
The Detroit Lions signed Hayes in mid-June 1975. Hayes' high school coach Earl Meneweather observed that even at 35, Hayes still had good size and speed and could make an excellent blocking back in the NFL. Hayes himself said that if he could not sign with any NFL team, he would return to Humboldt to complete his degree. The Lions waived the 35-year old Hayes in late August, and he did not play in the NFL again.

== NFL/AFL career statistics ==
Legend
	Won the Super Bowl
**Bold**	Career high

=== Regular season ===
Year	Team	Games		Rushing					Receiving				
Year	Team	GP	GS	Att	Yds	Avg	Lng	TD	Rec	Yds	Avg	Lng	TD
1963	DAL	1	0	0	0	0.0	0	0	0	0	0.0	0	0
1965	DEN	14	13	130	526	4.0	43	**5**	24	294	**12.3**	**66**	2
1966	DEN	11	10	105	417	4.0	**56**	1	8	49	6.1	29	0
1967	DEN	14	7	85	255	3.0	18	4	13	125	9.6	24	0
1968	KAN	11	4	85	340	4.0	25	4	12	108	9.0	22	1
1969	KAN	14	0	62	208	3.4	11	4	9	64	7.1	17	0
1970	KAN	14	14	109	381	3.5	22	**5**	26	219	8.4	28	0
1971	KAN	14	14	**132**	**537**	4.1	27	1	16	150	9.4	26	1
1972	KAN	13	12	128	536	**4.2**	28	0	**31**	**295**	9.5	29	**3**
1973	KAN	13	7	95	352	3.7	27	2	18	134	7.4	27	0
1974	KAN	14	6	57	206	3.6	19	2	4	23	5.8	9	0
		133	87	988	3,758	3.8	56	28	161	1,461	9.1	66	7

=== Playoffs ===
Year	Team	Games		Rushing					Receiving				
Year	Team	GP	GS	Att	Yds	Avg	Lng	TD	Rec	Yds	Avg	Lng	TD
1968	KAN	1	0	3	10	3.3	6	0	0	0	0.0	0	0
1969	KAN	3	0	**26**	98	3.8	13	**1**	**6**	**49**	**8.2**	**17**	0
1971	KAN	1	1	22	**100**	**4.5**	**16**	0	3	6	2.0	7	0
		5	1	51	208	4.1	16	1	9	55	6.1	17	0

== Personal life and death ==
After retiring as a player, Hayes worked as a counselor for San Francisco Juvenile Hall.

Hayes died on December 28, 2019, at the age of 79, in Oakland, California. He was survived by his wife of 54 years, Donna Hayes; daughter, Jacquetta Hayes; brother, the Reverend Joseph B. Hayes; and sister, Winnie Hayes.
