= 1969 American Football League playoffs =

American football playoffs

1969 AFL playoffs
- Dates: December 20, 1969 – January 4, 1970
- Season: 1969
- Teams: 4
- Defending champions: New York Jets
- Champion: Kansas City Chiefs
- Runner-up: Oakland Raiders
AFL playoffs
← 1968	1970–71 (NFL) →

The 1969 AFL playoffs was the postseason of the American Football League for its tenth and final season in 1969. For the first time, the ten-team league scheduled a four-team postseason, consisting of the top two teams from the two divisions. The division champions hosted the second place teams from the other division; both Western division teams won and advanced to the league championship game, with the winner advancing to play the NFL champion in Super Bowl IV in New Orleans on January 18, 1970.

Previously, the only scheduled postseason contest was the AFL Championship Game, between the two division winners, with the host site alternating between the divisions. Ties for a division title were resolved with an unscheduled tiebreaker playoff game (1963: East, 1968: West), while the other division's winner was idle.

Eastern runner-up Houston (6–6–2) had the league's fifth-best record; San Diego (8–6) was fourth, but finished third in the West and did not qualify for the postseason. Oakland (12–1–1) and Kansas City (11–3), both from Western division, had the best records and both advanced to the AFL title game.

The opening round of the AFL postseason was played December 20–21, the final week of the regular season for the NFL; they played the first round of their postseason the following weekend (December 27–28), while the AFL was idle. Both league championship games were held on January 4; Super Bowl IV was on January 11.

== Playoffs ==
Divisional Playoff Games
December 20 – Shea Stadium
W-2	Kansas City Chiefs (11–3)	13
E-1	New York Jets (10–4)	6
December 21 – Oakland–Alameda County Coliseum
E-2	Houston Oilers (6–6–2)	7
W-1	Oakland Raiders (12–1–1)	56

AFL Championship Game
January 4 – Oakland–Alameda County Coliseum
W-2	Kansas City Chiefs	17
W-1	Oakland Raiders	7

=== Divisional playoffs ===
==== AFL: Kansas City Chiefs 13, New York Jets 6 ====
Kansas City Chiefs 13, New York Jets 6

Quarter	1	2	3	4	Total
Chiefs	0	3	3	7	13
Jets	3	0	0	3	6

at Shea Stadium, Queens, New York City

- Date: Saturday, December 20, 1969
- Game time: 1:30 p.m. EST
- Game weather: 33 °F (1 °C), relative humidity 51%, wind 18 mph (29 km/h), wind chill 22
- Game attendance: 62,977
- Referee: Jack Reader
- TV: NBC
- Pro Football-Reference.com

Game information
Scoring
- First quarter
  - NY – Jim Turner 27-yard field goal, Jets 3–0
- Second quarter
  - KC – Jan Stenerud 23-yard field goal. Tied 3–3
- Third quarter
  - KC – Jan Stenerud 25-yard field goal, Chiefs 6–3
- Fourth quarter
  - NY – Jim Turner 7-yard field goal. Tied 6–6
  - KC – Gloster Richardson 19-yard pass from Len Dawson (Stenerud kick), Chiefs 13–6

Kansas City, favored by three points, had defeated the Jets 34–16 five weeks earlier on the same field. They knocked off the defending Super Bowl champions in dominating form, holding them to just 234 yards and forcing four turnovers.

The heavy winds at Shea Stadium wreaked havoc on the kicking of Chiefs kicker Jan Stenerud, who missed three field goals throughout the game, including an early 47-yard attempt in the first quarter. New York quarterback Joe Namath then completed 4/4 passes on the way to a 27-yard Jim Turner field goal that put the home team in front, 3–0. Kansas City responded with Len Dawson's completions to Otis Taylor, Fred Arbanas, and Wendell Hayes for gains of 13, 12, and 17 yards moving the team into position for a 23-yard Stenerud field goal to tie the game. This was the only score of the second quarter, as neither team had much success moving the ball for the rest of the half. Stenerud's missed 44-yard field goal attempt was close as either team came to changing the scoreboard.

Defense continued to dominate the game in the second half, starting with Namath's interception to defensive back Emmitt Thomas. However, this resulted in another missed field goal try from Stenerud, a 44-yard attempt. The next time New York got the ball, Namath was intercepted again, this time by Jim Marsalis. Kansas City was forced to punt, but a running into the punter penalty against New York allowed them to keep possession. Dawson then threw a 27-yard completion to Arbanas that set up Stenerud's 25-yard field goal, giving the Chiefs a 6–3 lead.

New York responded with a drive deep into Chiefs territory. A pass interference penalty against Thomas in the end zone gave them a first down on the Chiefs 1-yard line, but Kansas City's defense made a crucial stand. On the first two plays, runs by Matt Snell and Bill Mathis were stuffed for no gain by linebacker Willie Lanier. New York attempted to pass the ball for a touchdown on 3rd down, but with all his receivers covered and facing a blitz from linebacker Jim Lynch, Namath was forced to throw the ball away. Rather than attempt a 4th down conversion, the Jets tied the game, 6–6, on Turner's 9-yard field goal.

Kansas City's goal line stand seemed to fire up their offense. On their ensuing drive, Dawson completed a 61-yard pass to Taylor. Then he found Gloster Richardson in the end zone for a 19-yard touchdown pass, giving the Chiefs a 13-6 fourth quarter lead.

There was still time for New York to come back, but Namath completed only 6 of his next 20 passes, while the team was unable to score despite drives to the Chiefs 16 and 13-yard lines. On the drive to the 13, after Namath misfired on two passes to the end zone, Marsalis recorded his second interception of the game.

Dawson completed 12 of 27 passes for 201 yards and a touchdown. Chiefs running back Mike Garrett was the top rusher of the game with 67 yards. Namath completed only fourteen of forty passes for 169 yards and was intercepted three times. The Jets did not return to the postseason for a dozen years, in 1981.

==== AFL: Oakland Raiders 56, Houston Oilers 7 ====
Oakland Raiders 56, Houston Oilers 7

Quarter	1	2	3	4	Total
Oilers	0	0	0	7	7
Raiders	28	7	14	7	56

at Oakland–Alameda County Coliseum, Oakland, California

- Date: Sunday, December 21, 1969
- Game weather: 61 degrees, relative humidity 91%, wind 17 mph (27 km/h)
- Game attendance: 54,539
- Referee: Ben Dreith
- TV: NBC
- Pro Football-Reference.com

Game information
Scoring
- First quarter
  - OAK – Fred Biletnikoff 13-yard pass from Daryle Lamonica (George Blanda kick). Raiders 7–0
  - OAK – George Atkinson 57-yard interception return (Blanda kick). Raiders 14–0
  - OAK – Rod Sherman 24-yard pass from Daryle Lamonica (Blanda kick). Raiders 21–0
  - OAK – Fred Biletnikoff 31-yard pass from Daryle Lamonica (Blanda kick). Raiders 28–0
- Second quarter
  - OAK – Charlie Smith 60-yard pass from Daryle Lamonica (Blanda kick). Raiders 35–0
- Third quarter
  - OAK – Rod Sherman 23-yard pass from Daryle Lamonica (Blanda kick). Raiders 42–0
  - OAK – Billy Cannon 3-yard pass from Daryle Lamonica (Blanda kick). Raiders 49–0
- Fourth quarter
  - HOU – Alvin Reed 8-yard pass from Pete Beathard (Roy Gerela kick). Raiders 49–7
  - OAK – Marv Hubbard 4-yard rush (Blanda kick). Raiders 56–7

Oakland was favored by thirteen points, and quarterback Daryle Lamonica tied a playoff record with six touchdown passes as the Raiders racked up 412 yards and 56 points, while holding Houston to just 197 yards and forcing five turnovers.

After the game started with a punt from each team, Oakland suddenly scored four consecutive times to take a 28–0 first quarter lead. First, Lamonica's 40-yard completion to running back Larry Todd set up his 10-yard touchdown pass to Fred Biletnikoff. Then on the first play of the Oilers ensuing drive, Raiders defensive back George Atkinson intercepted a pass from Pete Beathard and returned it 57 yards for a touchdown. After Houston got the ball back, they lost another turnover, this time a fumble by running back Hoyle Granger that Atkinson recovered on the Oilers 24-yard line. Lamonica then threw a 24-yard touchdown pass to Rod Sherman, giving the Raiders a 21–0 lead with over 6 minutes left in the first quarter. Houston managed to pick up a first down for the first time in the game on their next drive, but on the next play, Beathard fumbled the snap, and Tom Keating recovered it for Oakland on the Oilers 31. Lamonica then threw his third touchdown pass of the quarter, a 31-yard completion to Biletnikoff, giving the Raiders a 28–0 lead as the first quarter mercifully came to an end.

Oakland's defense continued to dominate in the second quarter, as Beathard threw another interception, this one to Willie Brown. However, this time Houston managed to prevent a score when Lamonica threw a pass that was intercepted by defensive back Miller Farr. This would be the only bright spot of the quarter for Houston, who soon had to punt again. After an Oilers punt, running back Charlie Smith scored on a 60-yard touchdown reception from Lamonica to give the Raiders a 35-0 lead going into halftime.

Early in the third quarter, Houston managed a drive deep into Raiders territory, but lost the ball again when Beathard was sacked for a 9-yard loss on 4th and 10 from the Raiders 16-yard line. Oakland then drove 75 yards to score on Lamonica's 23-yard touchdown pass to Sherman, giving them a 42-0 lead. Following a punt, Oakland drove 62 yards to Lamonica's 6th touchdown pass of the day, a 3-yard toss to tight end Billy Cannon, increasing their lead to 49-0 going into the 4th quarter.

Houston finally scored a touchdown in the final period, driving 95 yards to score on an 8-yard touchdown pass from Beathard to tight end Alvin Reed for the final touchdown pass in AFL history. Meanwhile, Lamonica sat out the rest of the game. His replacement, George Blanda, completed just 1 of 5 passes, but his completion was a 33-yard gain to running back Marv Hubbard that set up the final score of the day on Hubbard's 4-yard touchdown run.

Lamonica completed 13/17 passes for 276 yards and 6 touchdowns, with 1 interception. Smith caught 4 passes for 103 yards and a score. Beathard completed just 18/46 passes for 209 yards and touchdown, with 3 interceptions. Reed caught 7 passes for 81 yards and a touchdown.

The Oilers did not return to the playoffs again until December of 1978.

=== AFL Championship Game ===
Kansas City Chiefs 17, Oakland Raiders 7

Quarter	1	2	3	4	Total
Chiefs	0	7	7	3	17
Raiders	7	0	0	0	7

at Oakland–Alameda County Coliseum, Oakland, California

- Date: Sunday, January 4, 1970
- Game time: 1:00 p.m. PST
- Game weather: 45 °F (7 °C), wind 9 mph (14 km/h), relative humidity 78%
- Game attendance: 54,544
- Referee: Jack Vest
- TV announcers (NBC): Curt Gowdy, Kyle Rote
- Pro-Football-Reference.com

Game information

Scoring

- First quarter
  - OAK– Charlie Smith 3-yard rush (George Blanda kick), Raiders 7–0
- Second quarter
  - KC – Wendell Hayes 1-yard rush (Jan Stenerud kick), Tied 7–7
- Third quarter
  - KC – Robert Holmes 5-yard rush (Stenerud kick), Chiefs 14–7
- Fourth quarter
  - KC – Jan Stenerud 22-yard field goal, Chiefs 17–7

Top passers

- KC – Len Dawson – 7/17, 129 yards
- OAK – Daryle Lamonica – 15/39, 167 yards, 3 INT

Top rushers

- KC – Wendell Hayes – 8 rushes, 35 yards, 1 TD
- OAK – Hewritt Dixon – 12 rushes, 36 yards

Top receivers

- KC – Otis Taylor – 3 receptions, 62 yards
- OAK – Charlie Smith – 8 receptions, 86 yards

The Chiefs edged Oakland 17–7 in a hard fought defensive struggle; the teams combined for just 440 yards (233 for Oakland, 207 for KC) and had four turnovers each. It was a very satisfying win for Kansas City, who had lost to the Raiders twice during the season and in seven of their last eight, including a 41–6 loss in the previous year's postseason.

The Raiders opened up the scoring with a 66-yard drive, featuring Daryle Lamonica's 24-yard completion to Warren Wells on the Chiefs' 3-yard line. Running back Charlie Smith ran the ball across the goal line on the next play, giving Oakland a 7-0 lead. Both defenses would take over the majority of the rest of the half, but with 3:24 remaining in the second quarter, Kansas City, who had only gained two first downs up to now, drove 75 yards to tie the game. Quarterback Len Dawson started off the drive with a 14-yard completion to Otis Taylor, while Robert Holmes' 8-yard run moved the ball into Raiders territory on their 42 for the first time in the game as the clock ran down to the 2-minute warning. On the next play, Dawson threw a 41-yard completion to receiver Frank Pitts. Then Wendell Hayes scored on a 1-yard touchdown run to tie the game at 7 going into halftime.

Oakland seemed primed to respond in the third quarter with a drive to the Chiefs 33-yard line, but in what turned out to be a crucial play, Lamonica jammed his thumb and fingers when his throwing hand struck the helmet of Chiefs defensive end Aaron Brown, and had to miss the rest of the drive. Backup George Blanda took over and tried to take the team the rest of the way to the end zone, but a few players later, defensive back Emmitt Thomas made a clutch interception on the Chiefs' 5-yard line. Kansas City then drove 95 yards for a go-ahead score. The key play on the drive was a 35-yard reception by Taylor through triple coverage with the team facing 3rd and 13 from their own 2-yard line. Dawson later completed a 23-yard pass to Holmes on the drive, and defensive back Nemiah Wilson's pass interference penalty eventually gave Kansas City a first down on the Raiders' 7-yard line. Holmes carried the ball three straight times after that, the last a 5-yard touchdown run to put the Chiefs up 14-7.

Lamonica returned to the game in the 4th quarter, but was unable to lead the Raiders to any points, despite numerous opportunities. A promising drive into Kansas City territory was eliminated when Jim Kearney intercepted Lamonica's pass on the Chiefs' 18-yard line. Two plays later, defensive end Carlton Oats recovered a fumble from Holmes on the Chiefs' 24. But on the next play, Oakland gave the ball right back with an interception to rookie cornerback Jim Marsalis. Amazingly, Oakland got the ball back on another Holmes fumble, this one recovered by linebacker Dan Conners on the Chiefs' 31. Still, the only result would be another Lamonica interception, this one to Thomas, who returned it 62 yards to the Raiders' 18-yard line, setting up Jan Stenerud's 22-yard field goal that increased Kansas City's lead to 17-7. Oakland had one last chance to get back in the game when defensive end Ike Lassiter recovered a fumble from Dawson on the Kansas City 13 with two minutes left. But Lamonica threw four straight incompletions and the Chiefs ran out the rest of the clock.

Neither quarterback had a particularly good day. Dawson completed only 7 of 17 passes for 129 yards, while Lamonica finished 15/39 for 167 yards and three interceptions. Charlie Smith was the sole offensive star of the game, with 31 rushing yards and a touchdown, along with 8 receptions for 86 yards.

== See also ==
- 1969 American Football League season
- 1969 NFL playoffs
- Super Bowl IV
