= Jim Tyrer =

American football player (1939–1980)

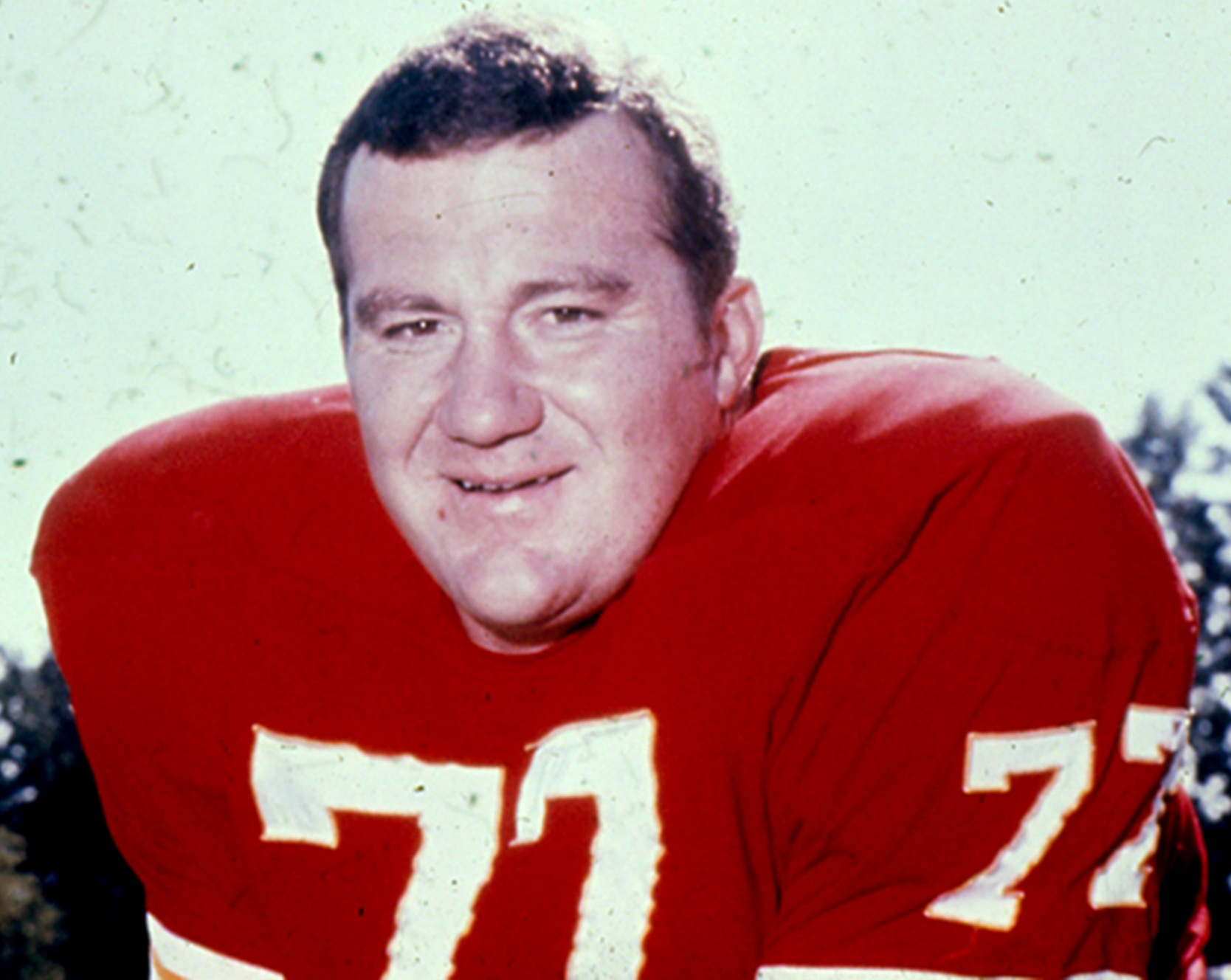
- Tyrer with the Kansas City Chiefs

No. 77, 71
- Position: Offensive tackle

Personal information
- Born: February 25, 1939; Newark, Ohio, U.S.
- Died: September 15, 1980 (aged 41); Kansas City, Missouri, U.S.
- Listed height: 6 ft 6 in (1.98 m)
- Listed weight: 280 lb (127 kg)

Career information
- High school: Newark
- College: Ohio State
- NFL draft: 1961: 14th round, 188th overall pick
- AFL draft: 1961: 3rd round, 22nd overall pick

Career history
- Dallas Texans / Kansas City Chiefs (1961–1973); Washington Redskins (1974)

Awards and highlights
- Super Bowl champion (IV); 3× AFL champion (1962, 1966, 1969); 5× First-team All-AFL (1965–1969); First-team All-Pro (1970); Second-team All-AFL (1963, 1964); 8× AFL All-Star (1962–1966, 1968, 1969); 2× Pro Bowl (1970, 1971); AFL All-Time Team; Kansas City Chiefs Hall of Fame; First-team All-Big Ten (1960)

Career AFL/NFL statistics
- Games played: 194
- Games started: 180
- Fumble recoveries: 2
- Stats at Pro Football Reference

James Efflo Tyrer (February 25, 1939 – September 15, 1980) was an American professional football player who was an offensive tackle, widely regarded as one of the most dominant players of his era. He played 14 years of professional football (1961 - 1974) after an All-American college career for the Ohio State Buckeyes, competing in the American Football League (AFL) for the Dallas Texans / Kansas City Chiefs and later in the National Football League (NFL): 13 years for Texans/Chiefs and his final year with the Washington Redskins. He was a nine-time Pro Bowl selection and a six-time first-team All-Pro. Standing 6'6" tall and weighing as much as 322 pounds during his career, Tyrer was known for his size, quick footwork, intelligence, and a notably large head, which he used to impose his will on opponents.

A cornerstone of the Chiefs' success, owner Lamar Hunt credited him for helping establish Kansas City as a major sports town. He was a Chiefs team captain four years (1967 - 1971) including the team's Super Bowl IV championship season. Tyrer is often referenced as "the greatest player not in the Hall of Fame," reflecting his lasting impact on the sport and much-debated omission from the Hall of Fame.

He played in a period when linemen were prohibited from using their hands for blocking, and defensive players were permitted to use the "head slap" technique—a practice later outlawed due to its brutality. Despite the physicality of the era and the demands of his position, Tyrer started 180 consecutive games, a then-record for the Chiefs, and every pre-season game (65) in his 13 years with the Texans/Chiefs franchise. His 180 starts surpasses all left tackles in the Pro Football Hall of Fame as of 2024.

In the early morning hours of September 15, 1980, to the shock of the sports world, Tyrer murdered his wife, Martha, and then died by suicide. Teammate and author Michael Oriard would later describe Tyrer in the book The End of Autumn as "the unlikeliest suicide-murderer to those who knew him."

Tyrer was a finalist for the Pro Football Hall of Fame at the time of the murder-suicide, his first year of eligibility. He did not advance in the selection process again for 44 years when research from Beneath the Shadow (a documentary by filmmaker Kevin Patrick Allen about Tyrer's life) led to a tacit acknowledgement from the PFHOF senior committee that Tyrer likely suffered from brain trauma. On December 3, 2024, Tyrer reached the finalist stage for the Pro Football Hall of Fame's Class of 2025.

== Early life ==
Born and raised in Newark, Ohio, Jim Tyrer attended Newark High School, where he excelled in track, basketball, and, most notably, football. On February 18, 1956, Tyrer’s father, Efflo Tyrer, who served as the city treasurer, suffered a fatal heart attack while attending the Central Ohio League high school basketball championship, which Newark won. The following night, 17-year-old Tyrer led his team to victory in a highly anticipated matchup against Mount Vernon High. He scored 24 points in the 68–62 triumph, later telling reporters, “Dad would have wanted me to play.”

In 1970, Tyrer's No. 77 jersey was retired as he was inducted into the Newark High School Hall of Fame.

== College career ==
Tyrer played college football at Ohio State University under head coach Woody Hayes, and earned All-America honors. Hayes did not have a helmet that would fit Tyrer. A regular helmet had to be split in the middle and reconnected with a wide strip in the middle. A Riddell Company representative made several flights to Columbus, Ohio to get the changes right.

== Professional career ==
Tyrer signed with the American Football League's Dallas Texans in 1961. He played 13 years with that franchise (180 consecutive games), which became the Kansas City Chiefs in 1963, helping set the standard for his position at left offensive tackle. His 14th and final season was with the Washington Redskins under head coach George Allen, who preferred veteran players. Tyrer was traded from the Chiefs in late August 1974 for three draft picks.

Tyrer was named AFL Offensive Lineman of the Year in 1969. He and Ed Budde at guard made a powerful left side. In Super Bowl IV, Tyrer and Budde opened holes for Chiefs running backs against the Minnesota Vikings' opposing defensive linemen Jim Marshall and Alan Page, respectively, gaining 151 yards on 42 carries (3.6 yards per attempt) and 122 net passing yards in the team's upset 23–7 victory. Pundits noted that Chiefs' running backs Warren McVea and Mike Garrett, both 5'9", were "camouflaged" by Tyrer, giving them an initial advantage against opponents.

Tyrer was an anchor of the Texans/Chiefs' line and was selected as The Sporting News'' AFL All-League tackle eight consecutive years, from 1962 through 1969. He was an AFL Western Division All-Star seven times, in 1962, 1963, 1964, 1965, 1966, 1968 and 1969 before also capturing a pair of All-AFC accolades in 1970–71. His efforts in the upstart league would result in his selection to the American Football League All-Time Team. Houston Oilers defensive end Elvin Bethea, himself a member of the Professional Football Hall of Fame, described Tyrer as "The preeminent left tackle in all of football. All other blockers I faced in the NFL were mediocre compared to him."

Tyrer announced his retirement in June 1975. He was inducted into the Kansas City Chiefs Hall of Fame on February 25, 1977. Tyrer jokingly said he'd been told he'd never win such an honor because "they'd never be able to accumulate enough metal to match the size of my head."

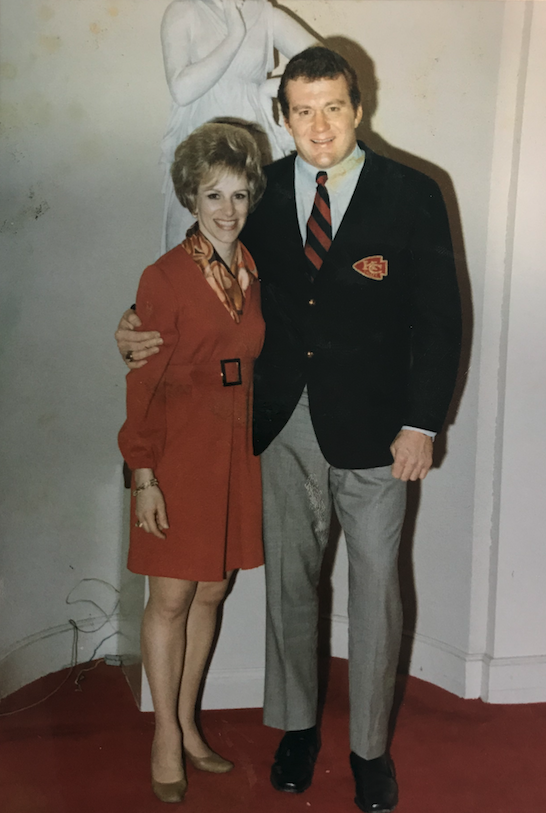
Martha and Jim Tyrer at his induction ceremony to the Kansas City Chiefs Hall of Fame, Feb. 26, 1977.

== Family ==
Jim and Martha Tyrer had four children: Tina, Brad, Stefanie and Jason. Tyrer's sons, Brad and Jason, went on to college football careers in the Big Eight Conference. Brad played for Nebraska under head coach Tom Osborne from 1982 to 1986. Jason was a defensive end for Kansas under head coach Glen Mason from 1988 to 1992. The resilience and post-tragedy successes of the children are what filmmaker Allen says drew him to create Beneath the Shadow, "It's pretty rare that you see four kids that go through something like this, and you look at them and you say, 'Wow that's motivating,'"

== After football ==
Following his retirement from football, Tyrer ran his own company, Pro Forma, representing professional athletes in commercial ventures. After the business failed, he transitioned to working as a manufacturer's representative, selling products on the road. He then operated two separate flea market booths in succession before buying and managing Crown Tire and Alignment, a gas station/tire store which also failed. In the last months of his life, amid unemployment, Tyrer and his wife, Martha, deeply in debt, sold Amway products.

== Death ==
In the pre-dawn hours of September 15, 1980, Tyrer shot and killed his wife Martha before turning the gun on himself and taking his own life. Three of the Tyrer's four children — 17-year-old Brad, 12-year-old Stef, and 11-year-old Jason — were in the home at the time of the murder-suicide. The afternoon before, Tyrer had attended a Chiefs game at Arrowhead Stadium with son Jason.

In 2021, the short documentary "A Good Man: The Jim Tyrer Story" by Kansas City filmmaker Kevin Patrick Allen was shown in select screenings, including a gathering of the Super Bowl IV champion Kansas City Chiefs and members of the Tyrer family. It led to a more extensive investigation into Jim and Martha Tyrer's deaths and the lives of their surviving children for a yet-to-be-released feature-length film "Beneath the Shadow." In June 2024, the Kansas City Star published an op-ed from Allen that revealed key findings strongly suggesting Tyrer suffered from chronic traumatic encephalopathy (CTE) at the time of his death. Among those findings, a specialist who examined Tyrer two days before his death. Dr. Douglas Paone told Allen, “He (Tyrer) had CTE. There’s not a doubt in my mind.” Paone noted that Tyrer was having headaches, abdominal pain and a general feeling of not being himself. When Paone was unable to pinpoint the cause of Tyrer's maladies, Martha Tyrer grabbed Paone by the arm while exiting the office and said, "there's something wrong with him... he's just not the same." Tyrer played in an era where lineman were expected to use their head as a battering ram, and his daughter Tina has stated that the custom helmet he used for his large frame (6-7, 290 pounds) had a half-inch of cardboard lining with no suspension.

In 2024, he was named as a Seniors finalist for the Pro Football Hall of Fame, marking the first time he has been considered by the full board since 1981. Tyrer is one of only two eligible players with at least six All-Pro selections to not be a member of the Pro Football Hall of Fame.

== See also ==
- List of American Football League players
- Deceased players suspected of having had CTE
