= 1963 Kansas City Chiefs season =

NFL team season (moved from Dallas)

- Owner: Lamar Hunt
- General manager: Jack Steadman
- Head coach: Hank Stram
- Home stadium: Municipal Stadium

Results
- Record: 5–7–2
- Division place: 3rd AFL Western
- Playoffs: Did not qualify
- AFL All-Stars: TE Fred Arbanas; G Ed Budde; OT Jim Tyrer; DE Mel Branch; LB Walt Corey; DB Dave Grayson; DB Duane Wood; S Johnny Robinson

The 1963 Kansas City Chiefs season was the 4th and inaugural season for the Kansas City Chiefs as a professional AFL franchise; Despite winning the AFL championship game the previous year, the Chiefs were 5–7–2 in 1963, third in the four-team Western division. The Chiefs were winless for two months in the middle of the season and were eliminated from the postseason in mid-November after ten games. They finished the season with three consecutive wins at home, with diminished attendance. Their 27–27 tie with the Buffalo Bills in September was the first tie in franchise history.

For the previous three seasons, the team was known as the Dallas Texans and played at the Cotton Bowl. Owner and founder Lamar Hunt moved the team following the 1962 AFL Championship. Despite enormous success in Dallas, the city could not sustain two professional football franchises (the other being the NFL's Dallas Cowboys). The team was renamed the Kansas City Chiefs and moved into Municipal Stadium alongside the Kansas City Athletics baseball team. The Chiefs 59–7 victory over the Denver Broncos in week 1 set two franchise records that still stand as of the end of the 2021 season: points scored in a game (59) and largest margin of victory (52).

== Move to Kansas City ==
After three seasons in Texas, including an AFL championship in 1962, it was apparent that Dallas couldn’t support two teams. Hunt investigated opportunities to move his team to several cities for the 1963 season, including Miami, Atlanta, Seattle, and New Orleans. Hunt wanted to find a city to which he could commute easily from Dallas, and when he was unable to secure Tulane Stadium in New Orleans because the university didn’t want its football program to compete with a pro team, he was persuaded by Mayor H. Roe Bartle to move to Kansas City, Missouri.

The negotiations in Kansas City were conducted in secrecy. On several occasions Hunt and Jack Steadman, the team's general manager, were in Kansas City and met with businessmen. Bartle introduced Hunt as "Mr. Lamar" in all the meetings with other Kansas City businessmen. Steadman was introduced as "Jack X."

Most impressive about this move was the support the team received from the community even before the team announced the move. Hunt made the move dependent upon the ability of Mayor Bartle and the Kansas City community to guarantee him 35,000 in season ticket sales. Hunt had arrived at this number because that was the Texans' average attendance at the Cotton Bowl in Dallas. An ambitious campaign took shape to deliver on Bartle's guarantee to Hunt of tripling the season-ticket base the Texans had enjoyed in Dallas. Kansas City's mayor also promised to add 3,000 permanent seats to Municipal Stadium, as well as 11,000 temporary bleacher seats. Along with Bartle, a number of other prominent Kansas Citians stepped forward to aid in the efforts, putting together more than 1,000 workers to sell season tickets.

Bartle called to his office 20 business leaders and called upon them to form an association later known as "The Gold Coats", whose sole objective was to sell and take down payments on the 35,000 season tickets required. Not an easy task when one considers the move was still secret and "The Gold Coats" had to sell season tickets to people without knowing the team name, where it was coming from, who the owner was, which football league they played in, who the players or coaches were, when the team played its first game in Kansas City, or where it played. Hunt gave Bartle a four-month deadline; Bartle and "The Gold Coats" made good in only eight weeks. Later, Hunt admitted he was really only hoping for 20,000, for which he still would have moved the franchise. On May 22, Hunt announced he was moving the franchise to Kansas City, Missouri.

Hunt, with a roster replete with players who had played college football in Texas, wanted to maintain a lineage to the team's roots and wanted to call the club the Kansas City Texans. "The Lakers stayed the Lakers when they moved from Minnesota to California", he reasoned. "But Jack Steadman convinced me that wasn’t too smart. It wouldn’t sell." The team was renamed the Chiefs—one of the most popular suggestions Hunt received in a name-the-team contest and began playing in Kansas City's Municipal Stadium in 1963. A name also considered at the time for the team was the Kansas City Mules.

The name, "Chiefs" is derived from Mayor Bartle, who 35 years prior, founded the Native American-based honor society known as The Tribe of Mic-O-Say within the Boy Scouts of America organization, which earned him the nickname, "The Chief".

The Chiefs' first Kansas City home was at 22nd and Brooklyn, called Municipal Stadium, which opened forty years earlier in 1923 and had 49,002 seats. The Chiefs shared Municipal Stadium with the Kansas City Athletics of Major League Baseball. The first appearance of the Chiefs in Municipal Stadium attracted just 5,721 fans for a 17–13 preseason victory over Buffalo on August 9.

== Season background ==
The Chiefs' inaugural season in Kansas City began with owner Lamar Hunt's trade of quarterback Cotton Davidson to the Oakland Raiders, which landed the number one overall selection in the AFL draft (which Kansas City used to select Buck Buchanan). Ironically, the Raiders would later select Gene Upshaw in 1967 for the express purpose of blocking Buchanan. The Chiefs tabbed offensive guard Ed Budde from Michigan State with their own number one selection, while stealing another future Hall of Fame inductee, Bobby Bell from Minnesota in the seventh round. Buchanan, Budde and Bell all became starters on their way to a combined 526 games with the team and all three of them played their entire careers with the Chiefs.

Rookie running back Stone Johnson, who was a sprinter in the 1960 Summer Olympics in Rome, suffered a fractured vertebra in his neck in a preseason game against Houston on August 31 in Wichita, Kansas. He died 8 days later on September 8 and his jersey number 33 was subsequently retired. The Chiefs finished their first season in Kansas City with a 5–7–2 record and failed to reappear in the AFL Championship game for a consecutive year.

== Personnel ==
=== Roster ===
1963 Kansas City Chiefs roster
Quarterbacks: 16 Len Dawson QB; 12 Eddie Wilson QB / P; Running Backs: 30 Jack Spikes P/FB; 23 Bert Coan HB; 32 Curtis McClinton FB; 26 Frank Jackson HB; Wide Receivers / Flankers: 28 Abner Haynes WR / RB / KR; 85 Dick Johnson WR/FL; 42 Johnny Robinson HB / WR / DB; Tight Ends: 84 Fred Arbanas TE; 88 Chris Burford WR / E	Offensive Linemen: 79 Charley Diamond T/G; 63 Marvin Terrell G; 77 Jim Tyrer G; 71 Ed Budde LG; 66 Bill Diamond G; 61 Dennis Biodrowski G; 65 Jon Gilliam C; 60 Al Reynolds RG; 64 Curt Merz RG; 73 Dave Hill RT; Defensive Linemen: 78 Bobby Bell LDE; 75 Jerry Mays DE; 86 Buck Buchanan LDT; 72 Paul Rochester DT; 70 Curt Farrier DT; 87 Mel Branch RDE	Linebackers: 56 Walt Corey RLB; 69 Sherrill Headrick MLB; 35 Smokey Stover LLB; 55 E.J. Holub LLB; 69 Sherrill Headrick MLB; Defensive Backs: 48 Duane Wood LCB; 25 Charley Warner LCB; 20 Bobby Hunt SS; 45 Dave Grayson RCB; 14 Bobby Ply DB; Special Teams: 51 Tommy Brooker K / LB; 44 Jerrel Wilson P; Rookies in italics

== Preseason ==
The Chiefs lost their exhibition opener in San Diego before reeling off three straight wins, then fell to the Oilers in Wichita in the preseason finale.

=== Schedule ===
Week	Date	Opponent	Result	Record	Venue	Attendance
1	August 3	at San Diego Chargers	L 14–26	0–1	Balboa Stadium	Not reported
2	August 9	at Buffalo Bills	W 17–13	1–1	Municipal Stadium	5,721
3	August 17	at Oakland Raiders	W 35–21	2–1	University of Washington Husky Stadium (Seattle, WA)	13,000
4	August 23	Denver Broncos	W 30–16	3–1	Municipal Stadium	6,865
5	August 31	Houston Oilers	L 17–23	3–2	University of Wichita Veterans Field (Wichita, KS)	11,000

== Regular season ==
Coming off the longest game (at that point) in football history against the Houston Oilers in the AFL championship game, hopes were high for a repeat title. The Chiefs could not find the same swagger in their new home in Kansas City for their inaugural season. They finished at 5–7–2, which included three wins to finish the season.

=== Schedule ===
Week	Date	Opponent	Result	Record	Venue	Attendance	Recap
1	September 7	at **Denver Broncos**	**W** 59–7	1–0	Bears Stadium	21,115	Recap
2	Bye						
3	September 22	at Buffalo Bills	**T** 27–27	1–0–1	War Memorial Stadium	33,487	Recap
4	September 29	at **San Diego Chargers**	**L** 10–24	1–1–1	Balboa Stadium	22,654	Recap
5	October 6	Houston Oilers	**W** 28–7	2–1–1	Municipal Stadium	27,801	Recap
6	October 13	Buffalo Bills	**L** 26–35	2–2–1	Municipal Stadium	25,519	Recap
7	October 20	**San Diego Chargers**	**L** 17–38	2–3–1	Municipal Stadium	30,107	Recap
8	October 27	at Houston Oilers	**L** 7–28	2–4–1	Jeppesen Stadium	26,331	Recap
9	November 3	at **Oakland Raiders**	**L** 7–10	2–5–1	Frank Youell Field	18,919	Recap
10	November 8	**Oakland Raiders**	**L** 7–22	2–6–1	Municipal Stadium	24,897	Recap
11	November 17	at Boston Patriots	**T** 24–24	2–6–2	Fenway Park	17,270	Recap
12	November 24	Scheduled AFL games postponed to December 22					
13	December 1	at New York Jets	**L** 0–17	2–7–2	Polo Grounds	18,824	Recap
14	December 8	**Denver Broncos**	**W** 52–21	3–7–2	Municipal Stadium	17,443	Recap
15	December 14	Boston Patriots	**W** 35–3	4–7–2	Municipal Stadium	12,598	Recap
16	December 22	New York Jets	**W** 48–0	5–7–2	Municipal Stadium	12,202	Recap
Note: Intra-division opponents are in **bold** text.

== Standings ==
AFL Western Division
	W	L	T	PCT	DIV	PF	PA	STK
San Diego Chargers	11	3	0	.786	3–3	399	255	W2
Oakland Raiders	10	4	0	.714	6–0	363	282	W8
Kansas City Chiefs	5	7	2	.417	2–4	347	263	W3
Denver Broncos	2	11	1	.154	1–5	301	473	L7

Note: Tie games were not officially counted in the standings in the AFL.
