= Goldie Sellers =

American football player (1942–2020)

No. 21, 20
- Position: Cornerback

Personal information
- Born: January 9, 1942; Winnsboro, Louisiana, U.S.
- Died: March 29, 2020 (aged 78); Golden, Colorado, U.S.
- Listed height: 6 ft 2 in (1.88 m)
- Listed weight: 198 lb (90 kg)

Career information
- High school: Richwood (LA)
- College: Grambling State (1964-1965)
- NFL draft: 1966: 20th round, 302nd overall pick
- AFL draft: 1966: 8th round, 66th overall pick

Career history
- Denver Broncos (1966-1967); Kansas City Chiefs (1968-1970); Houston Oilers (1971)*; New England Patriots (1971)*
- * Offseason or practice squad member only

Awards and highlights
- Super Bowl champion (IV); AFL champion (1969)

Career AFL statistics
- Return yards: 918
- Total touchdowns: 5
- Stats at Pro Football Reference

Goldie Sellers (January 9, 1942 – March 28, 2020) was an American professional football defensive back in the American Football League (AFL). Sellers played collegiately at Grambling State University under coach Eddie Robinson. As a professional, he played four seasons as a cornerback for the Denver Broncos (1966–1967) and the Kansas City Chiefs (1968–1969). Sellers was a member of the Chiefs' Super Bowl IV-winning squad.

== Early life ==
Sellers was born on January 9, 1942, in Winnsboro, Louisiana. He attended Richwood High School, and played football under coach Mackie Freeze.

== College career ==
Sellers played both offense and defense at Grambling in football, under coach Eddie Robinson. Sellers was named All-Southwestern Athletic Conference (SWAC) in 1965, as a defensive back. Grambling won the SWAC championship in 1965 over Southern University. Sellers intercepted a pass on a fake field goal attempt in the championship game against Southern.

During his years at Grambling, Sellers's football teammates included future Pro Football Hall of Fame players Buck Buchanan and Willie Brown (who also played with Sellers for the Denver Broncos in 1966), along with defensive back Nemiah Wilson (who also played with Sellers in Denver in 1966–67), among others. He also ran track at Grambling, including 9.4 seconds in the 100-yard dash.

== Professional career ==
The Denver Broncos drafted Sellers in the 8th round of the 1966 AFL draft (66th overall). The Chicago Bears selected him in the 20th round of the 1966 NFL draft (302nd overall). He received a bonus and a car when he signed with the Broncos.

Before his 1966 rookie season, in training camp Sellers ran the 40-yard dash in 4.5 seconds, while wearing his full football uniform. As a rookie, Sellers started seven games at strong safety for the Broncos, with three interceptions. He also led the AFL in kickoff return average, returning 19 kickoffs for a 28.5 yards per return average. He also led the league with two returns for touchdowns, and tied for the longest return (100 yards). He also had an 88-yard touchdown return. Through the 2024 NFL season, Sellers still held the Broncos franchise records for career kickoff returns for touchdowns (2; with Trindon Holliday), and returns for touchdowns in a single season.

In 1967, he started eight games at left cornerback for the Broncos, with a team-high seven interceptions including a 47-yard touchdown return. He returned four punts and six kickoffs that year. Sellers was traded to the Kansas City Chiefs in 1968 along with running back Wendell Hayes for third and fourth round draft picks. Ironically, Sellers had been beaten for three touchdown catches by the Chiefs' Otis Taylor at the end of the preceding season, for which he was lambasted by Broncos' coach Lou Saban; the only times all year the ball was successfully thrown over him. He was well-liked by his Broncos teammates.

Sellers started six games at left cornerback for the Chiefs in 1968, with three interceptions. He also returned one punt 76 yards for a touchdown in a game against the Boston Patriots. In a late season game against the San Diego Chargers, he held future Hall of Fame receiver Lance Alworth to three catches for only 39 yards. He was a member of the 1969 Chiefs' team that won Super Bowl IV, as a backup defensive back. Sellers scored a 21-yard touchdown that season, after he recovered an Essex Johnson fumble on a kickoff return in a game against the Cincinnati Bengals.

Before the start of the 1970 season, Chiefs' coach Hank Stram had plans to move Sellers from defensive back to wide receiver. Sellers suffered a thigh injury during the 1970 training camp and was placed on injured reserve for the season. He was traded to the Houston Oilers, but was released without playing for them; and was also briefly with the Patriots, but again did not play in any games for them.

Over his four-year NFL career, Sellers played in 55 games, starting 21 in the defensive backfield, with 13 interceptions and one returned for a touchdown. He returned 19 punts for an 11.4 yards per return average with one touchdown, and 27 kickoffs for a 26-yard per return average and two touchdowns.

== Personal life ==
After retiring from football, Sellers worked in sales for a telephone company and was a substitute teacher. Sellers and his family lived in Applewood Mesa, Jefferson County, Colorado. Sellers and his wife discovered a parcel of land there during his 1966 training camp, and built a home there a few years later.

== Death ==
Sellers died on March 28, 2020, from cancer, in Golden, Colorado. He was survived by his wife of over 50 years, Vasa "Peaches" Sellers, whom he met as a sophomore at Grambling, and three children.

== See also ==
- List of American Football League players
