= Dave Hill (American football) =

American football player (1941–2022)

No. 73
- Position: Offensive tackle

Personal information
- Born: February 1, 1941; Lanett, Alabama, U.S.
- Died: March 14, 2022 (aged 81); Panama City Beach, Florida, U.S.
- Listed height: 6 ft 5 in (1.96 m)
- Listed weight: 260 lb (118 kg)

Career information
- College: Auburn (1959-1962)
- NFL draft: 1963: 5th round, 62nd overall pick
- AFL draft: 1963: 24th round, 192nd overall pick

Career history
- Kansas City Chiefs (1963-1974)

Awards and highlights
- Super Bowl champion (IV); 2× AFL champion (1966, 1969); All-AFL (1969); Kansas City Chiefs Hall of Honor

Career NFL/AFL statistics
- Games played: 150
- Games started: 141
- Fumble recoveries: 1
- Stats at Pro Football Reference

David Harris Hill (February 1, 1941 – March 14, 2022) was an American professional football player. He is a member of the Alabama Sports Hall of Fame, inducted in 2011, and a member of the Kansas City Chiefs Hall of Honor, inducted in 1997.

Hill was born in Lanett, Alabama and attended Lanett High School. He graduated in 1959 and attended Auburn University along with fellow Lanett High School alumnus, Bobby Hunt. Hunt played quarterback and defensive back while Hill played offensive and defensive line.

A 24th round draft choice in 1963 for the American Football League (AFL)'s Kansas City Chiefs, he wore jersey number 73. Hill went on to play 149 games in all with the Chiefs, the fourth most ever by a Kansas City offensive lineman. At one point, he did not miss a game for nine straight seasons.

He started for the Chiefs at right tackle in Super Bowl I and Super Bowl IV, earning two AFL Championship rings and a World Championship ring, and playing in the first (Super Bowl I) and last (Super Bowl IV) World Championships between the champions of the AFL and the NFL. In Super Bowl IV, he handled well one of the best defensive ends of that era, Carl Eller, a member of the Pro Football Hall of Fame, as the Chiefs rushed for 151 yards that day, for their first Super Bowl victory. Their second would not come until Super Bowl LIV, exactly fifty years later.

Hill died on March 14, 2022, at the age of 81.

== See also ==
- List of American Football League players
