= Nemiah Wilson =

American football player (born 1943)

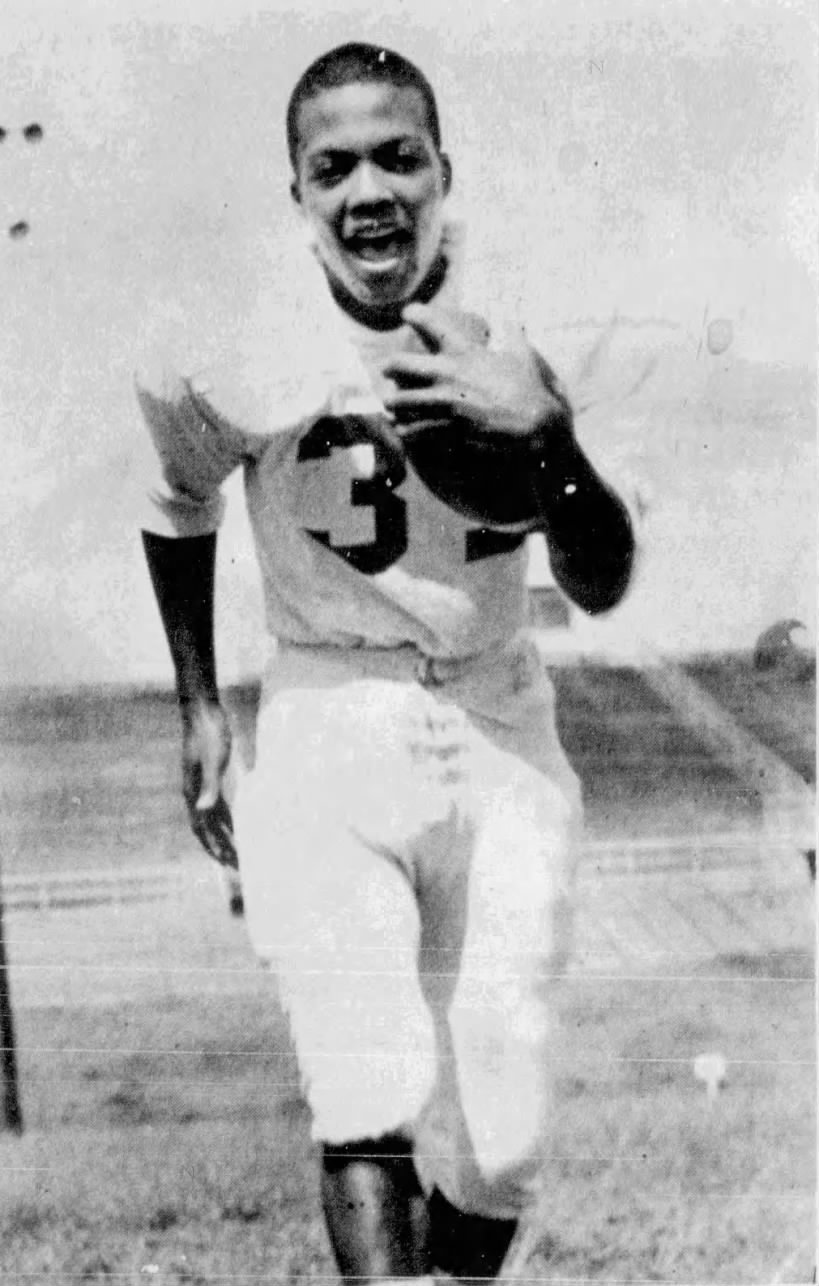
- Nemiah Wilson c. 1965

No. 45
- Position: Defensive back

Personal information
- Born: April 6, 1943 (age 83); Baton Rouge, Louisiana, U.S.
- Listed height: 6 ft 0 in (1.83 m)
- Listed weight: 165 lb (75 kg)

Career information
- High school: McKinley (Baton Rouge)
- College: Grambling (1961–1964)
- NFL draft: 1965: undrafted

Career history
- Denver Broncos (1965–1967); New York Jets (1968)*; Oakland Raiders (1968–1974); Chicago Bears (1975)
- * Offseason or practice squad member only

Awards and highlights
- AFL All-Star (1967)

Career NFL statistics
- Interceptions: 27
- Interception yards: 486
- Touchdowns: 3
- Stats at Pro Football Reference

Nemiah Wilson Jr. (born April 6, 1943) is an American former professional football player who was a defensive back in the American Football League (AFL) and National Football League (NFL). He played college football for the Grambling State Tigers, and played professionally in the AFL for the Denver Broncos from 1965 through 1967, and then for the AFL's Oakland Raiders from 1968 through 1974, time which included the 1970 merger between the AFL and the NFL. He finished his career playing one final season for the Chicago Bears in 1975.

== Early life ==
Nemiah Wilson Jr. was born on April 6, 1943, in Baton Rouge, Louisiana. His parents were Nemiah Wilson Sr. and Julia Wilson. Wilson's grandfather, Nehemiah Wilson, was a Baptist bishop in Louisiana. He intermittently stayed at the Blundon Home, an organization in his hometown that took care of orphans and neglected children. He attended McKinley High School in Baton Rouge, where he played at halfback. He was the top college prospect in the state of Louisiana by the time he graduated in 1960.

== College career ==
Wilson joined the Grambling State Tigers in 1961 following a "star-spangled" high school career. While he played offense in high school, the only way Wilson could make the team was playing defense. He started regularly playing at defensive end by his junior year. He was also a return specialist. In one 1962 game against Alcorn State University, Wilson scored touchdowns on two punt returns.

== Professional career ==
=== Denver Broncos (1965–1967) ===
Going undrafted in 1965, Wilson was not seen as much of a prospect due to his size. Standing at 6 feet (1.8 m) and 168 pounds (76 kg), he was overlooked by most teams in favor of other prospects. George Dickson, the defensive backfield coach for the Denver Broncos, was given a tip from a friend about Wilson. After encouragement from his coach Oree Banks, Wilson tried out for the Broncos and quickly became a star. He signed a $10,000 contract with the team in March 1965.

Wilson was immediately seen as a potential challenger to the established four veterans of the Broncos secondary. He took in two interceptions in a November game against the Houston Oilers during his rookie season. Continuing his success on special teams in his professional career, he was referred to as one of the nation's top two return specialists alongside fellow Bronco Goldie Sellers. On October 8, 1966, he returned a kickoff for 100 yards, tying the Broncos record at the time.

During the 1967 season, Wilson totaled 153 yards off of interceptions, the second highest total for the Broncos at the time, and was named to the 1967 AFL All-Star team. Meanwhile, Wilson struggled to get along with Broncos head coach Lou Saban when he took over the team. In July 1968, the Broncos traded Wilson to the New York Jets for an undisclosed draft pick. Wilson eventually returned to the Broncos only a month later after contract disputes with coach Weeb Ewbank, being placed on the "voluntarily retired" list.

=== Oakland Raiders (1968–1974) ===
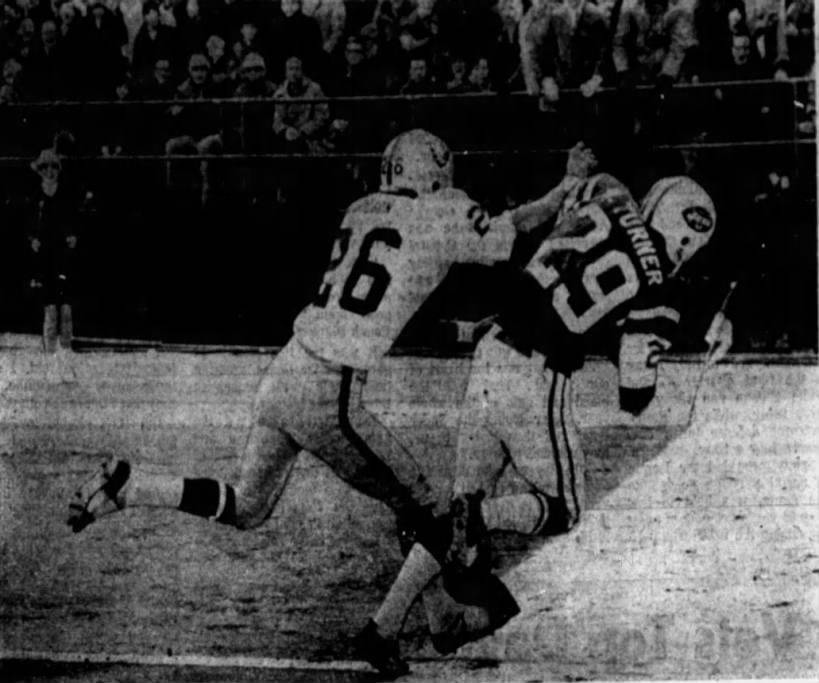
Nemiah Wilson tackling Bake Turner of the New York Jets in 1969

The Oakland Raiders signed Wilson as a free agent late into 1968, using him as the "last man" in their backfield where he saw very limited play. He was signed to temporarily replace Kent McCloughan after a gruesome knee injury. He began consistently starting the following season. He was credited as part of the Raiders' "Soul Patrol" secondary where he was noted for his speed.

Wilson took in an interception in his first playoff game with the Raiders in 1968 against the Kansas City Chiefs in a 41-6 win. He had a rough performance in the AFL Championship Game in 1970, being reportedly punched in the face by Otis Taylor and being called for two critical penalties during the match. He and his wife had received threats from an anonymous source in the days before, stating that if the Raiders did not lose then the caller would not be responsible for what would happen. The game left him in poor reputation with fans.

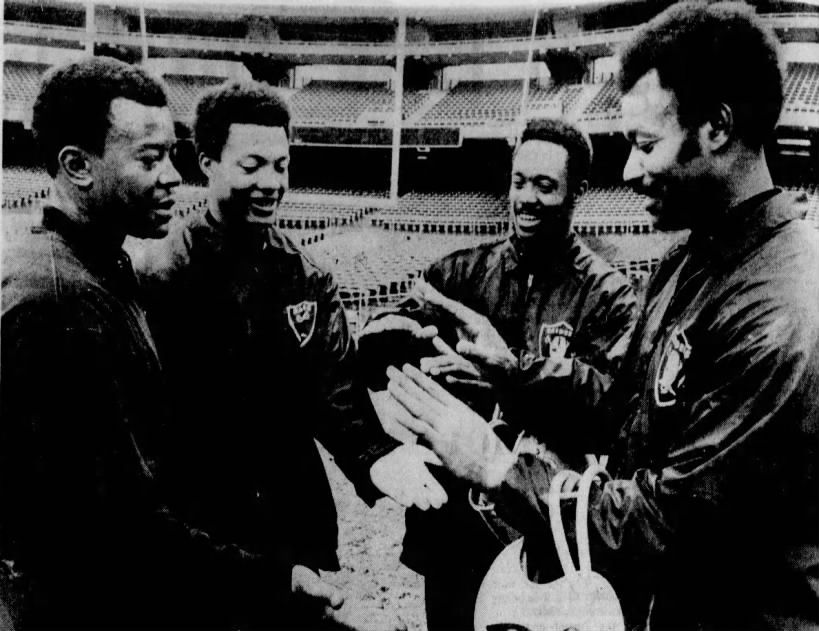
Nemiah Wilson (second from left) standing with other members of the Raiders' Soul Patrol

At the end of the 1971 season, Wilson was injured in a game against the Chiefs, capping off his five interception season. At this time, Wilson started to be favorably compared to future Hall of Famer and fellow Raider Willie Brown. In 1973, Wilson began a contract dispute with Raiders owner Al Davis. Wilson was seeking "special privileges," including the right to show up to practice late to continue the maintenance of his business. Wilson threatened retirement if the dispute was not resolved. Wilson eventually rejoined the team, but concerns were raised over his shape after missing a significant portion of training camp. This led to questions on if Wilson would start over Raiders newcomer Skip Thomas, though it was clear Wilson would eventually hold on to the position.

The struggle to retain the starting position against Thomas only increased for Wilson following the 1973 season, with Thomas getting in noteworthy experience playing for an injured Wilson. Wilson's age increasingly became a factor in the decision to move him away from the starting position. After reporting late to training camp in the preseason, Wilson had officially lost the starting job to Thomas, nicknamed "Doctor Death," by September 1974. Thomas was injured in Week 9 of the season, leaving Wilson to step in as his replacement. He had 19 interceptions with the Raiders by the end of his career with the club, marking 27 interceptions in total up to that point.

=== Chicago Bears (1975) ===
I'm just not one to sit on the bench. I can't get used to it. The only thing I want to do is play, and I don't care where.

Wilson was vocally upset with the Raiders after losing priority on the roster and after contract negotiations failed to go in his favor. He had attempted to bargain for a trade the previous season, but was shut down by the Raiders front office. Wilson was finally traded to the Chicago Bears in April 1975 for an undisclosed draft pick. He had become friendly with head coach Jack Pardee and cited the respect he saw from the coach as the driving force behind his eagerness to play with the team.

Following an underwhelming season with the Bears, Wilson was placed on the injured reserve list for a back sprain in November 1975. This meant he could not play for the rest of the season, and following complaints of "unacceptable medical treatment" alongside fellow NFL veteran Cid Edwards, Wilson decided to retire from professional football.

== Personal life ==
During his time in the NFL, Wilson ran Gridiron Pro Fashions, a men's fashion–focused tailoring business with Broncos halfback and Hall of Famer Floyd Little. Wilson ran the business while Little served as an accountant. After his NFL career, Wilson worked as a security guard at Abraham Lincoln High School. He is married to Jackie, and they have one child.
