= Jack Steadman (American football executive) =

American sports executive (1928–2015)

- Born: September 14, 1928; Warrenville, Illinois, U.S.
- Died: July 5, 2015 (aged 86)
- Education: Baylor University; Southern Methodist University
- Occupations: football executive; General manager, Kansas City Chiefs from 1960–1976; President of the Kansas City Chiefs, 1976–1989

Jack W. Steadman (September 14, 1928 – July 5, 2015) was an American professional football executive who served as chairman, vice president, president and general manager for the Kansas City Chiefs of the National Football League (NFL).

Steadman retired as vice chairman of the Chiefs on January 31, 2007, after being in the organization for over four decades, dating to their days as the American Football League (AFL)'s Dallas Texans.

Steadman – the franchise's first general manager – also served as executive vice president, president, vice chairman and chairman in his 47 years with the Chiefs. He won four championships as general manager including the team's Super Bowl IV title. Steadman and Lamar Hunt were at the forefront of the move to merge the AFL into the NFL.

== Background ==
Steadman grew up in Warrenville, Illinois and Dallas, Texas. He attended Baylor University and received his B.A. in Business Administration from Southern Methodist University. Steadman died at the age of 86 in 2015. He had Alzheimer's disease in his later years. He had 2 sons, Thomas and Donald. Also, a daughter, Barbara. He lived in Kansas City for over 30 years.

== Hunt and Steadman bring football to Kansas City ==
In the early 1960s, Steadman worked with businessman Lamar Hunt to establish the American Football League and the Dallas Texans. In 1963 the team moved to Kansas City, Missouri when Steadman and Hunt negotiated with Kansas City Mayor H. Roe Bartle to move the Texans to Kansas City as the Chiefs.

=== Truman Sports Complex ===
In 1967, Kansas City was considering replacing its aging Municipal Stadium with a new multi-use stadium for both its baseball and football teams. Denver self-educated architect Charles Deaton suggested to Steadman that the teams would be better served if each sport had its own stadium that was configured to its unique demands but that the complex reduce costs by sharing parking and highway expenses. The architect firm Kivett and Myers perfected the plan (adding a rolling roof) and voters approved it. (The rolling roof, however, was never added.) Arrowhead Stadium opened in 1972 alongside Royals Stadium (now known as Kauffman Stadium), which opened in 1973.

The rolling roof was not to be built but the concept established Kivett and its successors in Kansas City as the dominant architects for almost all single-purpose major league baseball and football stadiums that have been built since. In 2005, the rolling roof plan re-emerged as part of Kansas City's bid to host Super Bowl XLIX, but the measure failed in the polls.

== Chiefs organization ==
Steadman was named general manager to executive vice president and general manager in 1966; in August 1976 he was named president of the Chiefs; and in 1989 was named chairman of the board. During Steadman's term as president (1976–1989), the Chiefs entered a period of decline in which they never entered the playoffs for 15 years and only had four winning seasons.

In 2005, Steadman was inducted into the Chiefs Hall of Fame, the only executive other than Lamar Hunt to be honored with induction. Also in 2005, Steadman was appointed as the club's vice chairman of the board where he served through the end of the 2006 season until his retirement.

Steadman has joined Hunt in other ventures including Hunt Midwest Enterprises, Hunt Martin Materials, Hunt Midwest Real Estate Development Company. Steadman and Hunt developed Worlds of Fun, a 165-acre (0.67 km^{2}) family entertainment complex which opened in 1973 with Oceans of Fun following in 1982. They were sold in 1995 to Cedar Fair Entertainment Company.

== Community work ==
Steadman was active in local charities including chairman, president and campaign chairman of the Heart of America United Way; president of the Chamber of Commerce of Greater Kansas City; past chairman and board member of the Private Industry Council as well as the Full Employment Council. He was a director of the American Royal Association and the Starlight Theatre Association. Steadman also served as an advisory trustee for Midwest Research Institute and was a past member of the Civic Council Board of Directors. In 1988, Steadman was honored by the Chamber of Commerce of Greater Kansas City as the "Kansas Citian of the Year."
