= Ed Budde =

American football player (1940–2023)

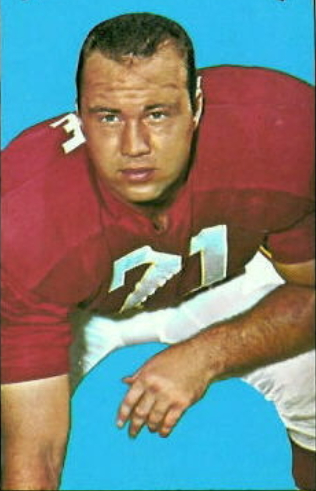
- Topps card of Budde, 1966

No. 71
- Position: Guard

Personal information
- Born: November 2, 1940; Highland Park, Michigan, U.S.
- Died: December 19, 2023 (aged 83)
- Listed height: 6 ft 5 in (1.96 m)
- Listed weight: 265 lb (120 kg)

Career information
- High school: Denby (Detroit, Michigan)
- College: Michigan State
- NFL draft: 1963: 1st round, 4th overall pick
- AFL draft: 1963: 1st round, 8th overall pick

Career history
- Kansas City Chiefs (1963–1976)

Awards and highlights
- Super Bowl champion (IV); AFL champion (1969); AFL All-Time Team; 2× First-team All-AFL (1966, 1969); 2× Second-team All-AFL (1967, 1968); 5× AFL All-Star (1963, 1966–1969); 2× Pro Bowl (1970, 1971); Kansas City Chiefs Hall of Honor; First-team All-American (1962)

Career NFL/AFL statistics
- Games played: 177
- Games started: 161
- Fumble recoveries: 3
- Stats at Pro Football Reference

Edward Leon Budde (/ˈbʌdi/ bud-ee; November 2, 1940 – December 19, 2023) was an American professional football guard. He played his entire career for the Kansas City Chiefs in the American Football League (AFL) and National Football League (NFL).

== Early life ==
Budde was born in Highland Park, Michigan, on November 2, 1940. He attended Detroit's Denby High School and played as a starter on the football team for three years, on offense and defense. He was a high school All-American in football, starring at offensive tackle. The team had a perfect season in 1957, and a championship, but was penalized with the forfeiture of four games because another one of its key players had forged a signature on a medical report.

As a senior (1958), Budde was named to the Detroit Free Press's All-City League offensive first team at tackle. He was later selected to the Free Press's first-team all-state team as well. He was named second-team Class A All-State tackle by the Associated Press (AP) (behind future NFL All-Pro and renowned offensive line coach Howard Mudd). Budde's high school coach Ed Rutherford considered the 6 ft 4 in (1.93 m) 230 pound (104.3 kg) Budde a man among boys, and one of the two top players he coached in his 17-year high school career (along with future Michigan State University head coach George Perles). Although an offensive star, he was also considered an excellent defensive lineman with cat-like swiftness.

He was also on the track and field team, and won the shot put event at the May 1958 City League's East Side track meet.

== College ==
Budde attended Michigan State University, and played varsity football under College Football Hall of Fame coach Duffy Daugherty from 1960-62 as an offensive tackle. As a senior, in 1962, Budde was selected by professional scouts to the Time magazine All-America team. The AP ranked Michigan State 15th at the end of the 1960 season (with a 6–2–1 record), 8th at the end of the 1961 season (with a 7–2 record), and although ranked as high as 4th during the 1962 season, were not ranked at the end of their 5–4 season.

George Perles was one of the assistant coaches on Budde's Michigan State teams. His Michigan State freshman class included Howard Mudd, as well as future NFL lineman Jim Kanicki. Other future AFL/NFL players who were Budde's teammates during his time at Michigan State include, among others, Hall of Famer Herb Adderly, Gary Ballman, George Saimes, Dave Behrman, Lonnie Sanders, and future Chiefs' teammates Fred Arbanas and Ed Lothamer.

Budde was selected to play in the 1963 College All-Star Game against the 1962 NFL champion Green Bay Packers, held in Chicago on August 2. He had been voted a team co-captain by his fellow players. The collegians surprisingly defeated the Packers 20–17. A key to the all-stars' victory was the excellent run and pass blocking by their offensive line, with Budde one of the standout linemen against the Packers, along with Michigan State teammate center Dave Behrman and Ohio State tackle Daryl Sanders. Budde was also selected to play in the December 1962 East-West Shrine Game, and the January 1963 Senior Bowl.

== Professional career ==
Budde was drafted as the first-round pick for both the NFL's Philadelphia Eagles and the American Football League's (AFL) Dallas Texans in the 1963 NFL and AFL drafts, respectively, before ultimately signing with the Texans in December 1962. The Texans' owner and a founder of the AFL, Lamar Hunt, moved the 1962 AFL Champions from Dallas to Kansas City, Missouri before the 1963 AFL season started, the team becoming the Kansas City Chiefs. A trade with the Oakland Raiders had given Hunt the first pick in the draft along with his own first round pick. With the first pick he selected future Pro Football Hall of Fame defensive tackle Buck Buchanan (No. 1), and then Budde with the Texans' own pick (No. 8).

Budde played for the Kansas City Chiefs for 14 years as the left offensive guard, longer than any other Chief except for punters Dustin Colquitt and Jerrel Wilson (15 years), and Len Dawson, Will Shields and Nick Lowery (14 years). He started alongside eight-time All-Pro left tackle Jim Tyrer from 1963-73. Through his first nine seasons, Budde did not miss a single start, playing in 177 games in his career; 12th most in franchise history (through the 2023 season). Budde's nickname on the Chiefs was "Bluto" after the villainous character from the Popeye comics.

Budde was 6 ft 5 in (1.96 m) and 265 pounds (120 kg) with an unusual stance, in that he put his left hand down instead of the usual right. Budde and the Chiefs won two American Football League Championships (1966 and 1969) and a world championship in Super Bowl IV after defeating the NFL's Minnesota Vikings 23–7. Budde and the Chiefs participated in the first Super Bowl, losing to the Packers 35–10.

During Budde's time exclusively in the AFL (1963-69), Budde was selected first- or second-team All-AFL (all-league team) four consecutive seasons (1966-69). In 1966, The AP named him first-team All-AFL, while The Sporting News named him to the second team (picked by the AFL's players). In 1967, the AP and Newspaper Enterprise Association (NEA) named him second-team All-AFL. In 1968, the AP, NEA, The Sporting News and United Press International (UPI) named him second-team All-AFL. In 1969, the AP, Sporting News and NEA named him first-team All-AFL, and the NEA named him first-team All-AFL/NFL. He was named first-team All-AFC conference in 1970 by The Sporting News and UPI and UPI second-team All-Conference in 1971.

Budde was selected to play in five AFL All-Star games, in 1963 as a rookie, 1966, 1967, 1968, and 1969; and two NFL Pro Bowl games, in 1970 and 1971.

In 1968, Budde became the first interior offensive lineman to be selected by the Associated Press as an Offensive Player of the Week.

Budde suffered a knee injury early in the 1975 season, and only played in one game. He played in 11 games the following year, but did not start any. He retired after the 1976 season. He gave a tearful speech to his teammates before his last game on December 12, 1976, against the 9–4 Cleveland Browns. The 4–9 Chiefs won the game 39–14, their largest margin of victory that season, and awarded Budde the game ball. Chiefs head coach Paul Wiggin said "'The guys cared so much for this one guy that they all wanted to walk off the field and hand Ed Budde the game ball. I never saw so much love for one guy'".

== Honors ==
Budde was named a member of the All-Time All-AFL Team First-team in 1970. In 1984, Budde was inducted into the Chiefs' Hall of Honor. He was inducted into the Missouri Sports Hall of Fame in 1998. In 2010, he was inducted into the Michigan State University Athletics Hall of Fame. In 2012, he was inducted into the Michigan Sports Hall of Fame.

== Personal life and death ==
Budde was married to his wife for over 60 years; together they had three children. One of their children, Brad, was a 1979 consensus All-American offensive lineman at the University of Southern California (USC). He was also named the 1979 Vince Lombardi Award winner for lineman of the year. Brad was selected by the Kansas City Chiefs in the first round of the 1980 NFL draft, with the 11th overall pick. This made Budde and his son Brad the only father-son combination to be first-round draft picks for the same NFL team. Like his father, Brad played left guard for the Chiefs, in a seven-year NFL career with the Chiefs.

Budde's other son, John Budde, was recruited to Michigan State by coach George Perles.

After retiring from football, Budde operated a Coors Brewing Company distributorship in the Kansas City area. He also owned a sports bar for a short time and was an account manager for Coca Cola.

Budde had a metal or plastic plate placed in his head as the result of a skull fracture from being hit with an 18 inch (45.7 cm) metal (lead or steel) pipe during a 1963 or 1964 altercation in a bar with two other men. He chose not to press criminal charges.

Budde died on December 19, 2023, at age 83.

== See also ==
- List of American Football League players

== Sources ==
- Gruver, Ed (1997). The American Football League: A Year-By-Year History, 1960–1969. Jefferson, North Carolina: McFarland & Company, Inc. ISBN 0-7864-0399-3.
- History: The AFL - Pro Football Hall of Fame link
- Miller, Jeff (2003). Going Long: The Wild Ten-Year Saga of the Renegade American Football League In the Words of Those Who Lived It. McGraw-Hill. ISBN 0-07-141849-0.
