= Robert Holmes (gridiron football) =

American gridiron football player (1945–2018)

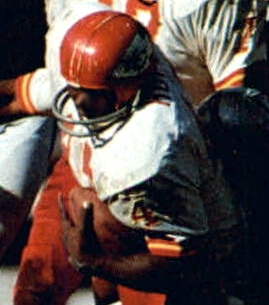
- Holmes playing for the Chiefs in the 1969 AFL Championship Game

No. 45, 36, 39, 38
- Position: Running back

Personal information
- Born: October 5, 1945; Huntsville, Texas, U.S.
- Died: April 14, 2018 (aged 72); Regina, Saskatchewan, Canada
- Listed height: 5 ft 9 in (1.75 m)
- Listed weight: 221 lb (100 kg)

Career information
- High school: Sam Houston (Huntsville)
- College: Southern
- NFL draft: 1968: 14th round, 375th overall pick

Career history
- Kansas City Chiefs (1968–1971); Houston Oilers (1971–1972); San Diego Chargers (1973); Portland Storm (1974); Houston Oilers (1975); Saskatchewan Roughriders (1976)

Awards and highlights
- Super Bowl champion (IV); AFL champion (1969); AFL All-Star (1969)

Career NFL/AFL statistics
- Rushing yards: 2,510
- Rushing average: 3.9
- Receptions: 113
- Receiving yards: 982
- Total touchdowns: 27
- Stats at Pro Football Reference

Robert Earl Holmes (October 5, 1945 – April 14, 2018) was an American football running back who played collegiately at Southern University and professionally in the American Football League (AFL) for the Kansas City Chiefs, and in the National Football League (NFL) for the Chiefs, the Houston Oilers, and the San Diego Chargers. He was an AFL All-Star in 1969, and played with the Chiefs in their defeat of the Oakland Raiders in the 1969 AFL Championship Game and in their crushing of the NFL's champion Minnesota Vikings in the fourth and final AFL-NFL World Championship Game. He joined the Saskatchewan Roughriders of the Canadian Football League (CFL) during the 1976 season, playing 5 regular season games and the Western Final. Several years later, he returned to Regina to live. He died on April 14, 2018, at the age of 72.

== See also ==
- Other American Football League players
