= Warren McVea =

American football player (1946–2025)

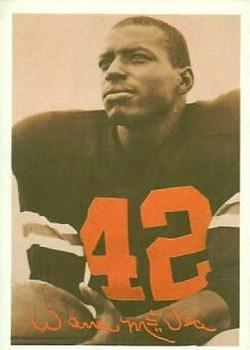
- McVea in 1969

No. 42, 6
- Positions: Running back, Wide receiver

Personal information
- Born: July 30, 1946; San Antonio, Texas, U.S.
- Died: October 19, 2025 (aged 79); Los Angeles, California, U.S.
- Listed height: 5 ft 9 in (1.75 m)
- Listed weight: 182 lb (83 kg)

Career information
- High school: Brackenridge (San Antonio)
- College: Houston
- NFL draft: 1968: 4th round, 109th overall pick

Career history
- Cincinnati Bengals (1968–1969); Kansas City Chiefs (1969–1973); Detroit Wheels (1974); Houston Texans (1974)

Awards and highlights
- Super Bowl champion (IV); AFL champion (1969); Second-team All-American (1967)

Career NFL/AFL statistics
- Rushing yards: 1,186
- Rushing average: 4.8
- Receptions: 38
- Receiving yards: 358
- Total touchdowns: 13
- Stats at Pro Football Reference

Warren McVea (July 30, 1946 – October 19, 2025) was an American professional football player who was a running back in the American Football League (AFL) and National Football League (NFL). He played college football for the Houston Cougars, earning second-team All-American honors in 1967.

== Early life ==
McVea was one of nine children of Daniel and Mattie McVea. He was known as "Wondrous Warren" during his high school football career at San Antonio's Brackenridge High School. He was a multi-faceted player, playing running back, flanker and a punt/kick return specialist.

Of his sterling high school career, a feature story in the November 9, 1964 Sports Illustrated stated, "During his career at San Antonio's Brackenridge High School he was the most exciting, the most talked-about and the most ardently sought-after Texas player in 20 years. In three years against the state's best high school competition, McVea scored just under 600 points. As a senior, he averaged better than a first down per carry and rushed for 1,332 yards."

== College career ==
Offered scholarships by 73 colleges in 1964, McVea signed with the University of Houston, making history by becoming the first African American to play football for the Cougars. "McVea is under tremendous pressure", according to the Sports Illustrated article written at the beginning of his freshman year at Houston. "Not only is he expected to lead his school to national football eminence, which he may, but he bears the burden of being the first Negro to receive a football scholarship to a major previously all-white college in Texas. His success at Houston could determine the speed with which Southwest Conference teams integrate." McVea, who would play for UH head coach Bill Yeoman, was quoted about his treatment during his freshman season, "It isn't a problem. I've been treated real nice by everyone." Despite the Sports Illustrated claim, McVea was not the first African-American to play major college football in Texas. Nearly a decade earlier, Abner Haynes and Leon King became the first when they played for North Texas State College (now the University of North Texas) in 1957. The misconception often comes from a change of conference affiliations for North Texas the year Haynes and King were promoted to the varsity team. North Texas joined the Missouri Valley Conference, along with Houston, when the two were promoted to the varsity squad. Houston even went as far to cancel their first scheduled inter-conference game in 1957 in protest of North Texas having Haynes and King on the roster.

During his three years on the football team, he earned All-American recognition twice.

McVea was on the receiving end of the longest pass play completed in Houston history – a 99-yard reception against Washington State University on September 23, 1966. That game marked the first football game ever played on artificial turf.

== Professional career ==
McVea was selected in the fourth round (109th overall) of the NFL/AFL 1968 Common Draft by the American Football League's Cincinnati Bengals during the team's expansion season. In 12 games, he rushed nine times for 133 yards (an astounding 14.8 yards per carry) including an 80-yard run, with one touchdown. He also caught 21 passes for 264 yards (a 12.6 average) and two touchdowns. He also returned 14 kicks for 210 yards, a 22.1 average.

He was traded to the AFL's Kansas City Chiefs for kicker Horst Muhlmann and a draft choice on September 8, 1969. McVea's timing proved to be excellent. McVea rushed 106 times for 500 yards (a 4.7 average) and seven touchdowns, with seven receptions for 71 yards (a 10.1 average) and he returned 13 kicks for 318 yards (a 24.5 average) as the Chiefs went on to capture the final American Football League championship. The Chiefs then defeated the Minnesota Vikings 23–7 in Super Bowl IV on January 11, 1970. In the Super Bowl, McVea rushed 12 times for 26 yards.

During his years in Kansas City, TV commentators referred to him as "The Flea", reflecting his small size and ability to avoid defenders.

In 1970, the Chiefs began play in the National Football League as a result of the NFL-AFL merger. In McVea's third pro season, he totaled 61 carries for 260 yards (a 4.3 average) while catching five passes for 26 yards. He returned three kicks for 57 yards.

In 1971, he rushed 68 times for 288 yards (a 4.2 average) and three touchdowns. He caught five passes but for -3 yards, and he returned nine kicks for 177 yards (a 19.7 average).

He was inactive for the 1972 season due to a knee injury.

His fifth and final year in the NFL/AFL was 1973, when he rushed only four times for five yards and returned eight kicks for 146 yards, an 18.3 average.

After the 1973 season, McVea signed with the fledgling World Football League's Detroit Wheels, and was immediately considered one of their top players. However, one month into the season, McVea was traded to the Houston Texans, most likely due to the precarious financial situation of the franchise. He later finished out his playing career with a tryout with the Houston Oilers, but injuries effectively ended the comeback.

== After football ==
McVea's post-football career saw his life unravel when in 1985, he was arrested for theft after asking a Houston restaurant for food (ostensibly for the poor), claiming that he was working for the Oilers and promising them free tickets to games.

The deaths of his parents, Daniel and Mattie McVea, within six months of each other in 1982 while Warren was in the midst of a divorce, propelled him over the breaking point. In an interview with The Daily Cougar, McVea recalled this period of his life as a time when he "lost it. I didn't know where I was." To cope with his problems, McVea started using drugs.

In 1989, he was convicted and sentenced for setting a female acquaintance's apartment on fire. Then in 1993, he was arrested for drug possession again and given 25 years in prison.

Leaving prison for good in 2000, he was inducted into the University of Houston's Athletic Hall of Fame in 2004. He worked as a courier, delivering photo film to retail stores.

"I was really, really pleased and impressed with how he's backed off and straightened himself up and now's a productive citizen", former Houston football coach Bill Yeoman said of McVea. "I think he's done a real good job."

McVea was inducted into the San Antonio Sports Hall of Fame in 2003, and inducted into the UH Hall of Honor the following year.

McVea died on October 19, 2025, at the age of 79.

== See also ==
- Other American Football League players
