= AFC West =

Division in the American Football Conference

- Conference: American Football Conference
- League: National Football League
- Sport: American football
- Founded: 1970
- No. of teams: 4
- Country: United States
- Most recent champion: Denver Broncos (16th title) (2025)
- Most titles: Denver Broncos (16 titles)

AFC West Teams Location

The American Football Conference – Western Division or AFC West is one of the four divisions of the American Football Conference (AFC) in the National Football League (NFL). The division comprises the Denver Broncos, Kansas City Chiefs, Las Vegas Raiders, and Los Angeles Chargers.

The division has sent teams to the Super Bowl twenty-one times beginning with Super Bowl I when the Chiefs played the Green Bay Packers, winning ten times, second only to the NFC East. As of the conclusion of the 2023 season, the Chiefs have the most Super Bowl wins of any AFC West team with four Super Bowl victories. The Broncos have appeared in the most Super Bowls in the division with eight, the Chiefs have appeared in seven, and the Raiders have appeared in five. The Chargers lost their lone Super Bowl appearance in Super Bowl XXIX. Two members of the Division also won back-to-back Super Bowls. The Broncos in 1997 and 1998 and the Chiefs in 2022 and 2023.

The Denver Broncos won the most recent and their 16th AFC West title in 2025. Kansas City's win in 2022 made the AFC West the only division in the NFL where all 4 teams had the same amount of division titles (15 each).

== History ==
The division was formed in 1960 as the American Football League's Western Division. In 1970, as part of the new NFL's two-conference, six-division alignment, the AFL West entered the merged league more or less intact as the AFC West.

The original AFL West had four members – the Dallas Texans (who moved to Kansas City in 1963 as the Chiefs), Denver Broncos, Los Angeles Chargers (who moved to San Diego in 1961, then back to Los Angeles in 2017) and Oakland Raiders (who moved to Los Angeles in 1982, back to Oakland in 1995, and Las Vegas in 2020). These four teams have remained in the AFC West since its inception, and are currently the only teams in the division. Given the fact that all four teams have played each other in the same division since 1960, the AFC West could be considered the oldest division (in its present form) in the NFL. Additionally, since the four teams have played each other at least twice a year for over 60 years, the entire division is considered one very large rivalry.

The Cincinnati Bengals played the last two AFL seasons in the AFL West despite being further east than Houston, where the Houston Oilers played at the time and were members of the AFL Eastern Division. The Bengals (along with the Oilers) moved to the AFC Central (formerly the NFL Century Division, now the AFC North) in 1970, forming rivalries with the Cleveland Browns and the Pittsburgh Steelers.

In 1977, the Seattle Seahawks were added to the AFC West after spending their expansion season in the NFC West; they would move back to the NFC West in 2002. The first-year Tampa Bay Buccaneers in 1976 played as a member of the AFC West before being aligned into the NFC Central in 1977.

Each of the four AFC West teams won a division title in the first four years of the realignment – Oakland in 2002, Kansas City in 2003, San Diego in 2004 and Denver in 2005. It is the only one of the eight NFL divisions to have all of its teams win titles in the first four seasons of the North-East-West-South format.

In the early and mid-2000s, the division was often cited as one of the NFL's "Toughest Divisions" due partially to the home-field advantages of Empower Field at Mile High, Arrowhead Stadium, Qualcomm Stadium and the Oakland Coliseum, although in 2008 the division was the NFL's weakest since the AFC Central in 1985 by sending the San Diego Chargers to the playoffs as division winners with an 8–8 record while the New England Patriots missed out at 11–5 after losing out on conference record tiebreakers for both the AFC East and the wild-card. In 2010, the Raiders swept the entire division, going 6–0, but failed to qualify for the playoffs as they only won two non-divisional games.

The division was very weak in 2011 as well, when a loss by the Raiders in the last game of the season gave the Broncos the division title with only an 8–8 record. Only the NFC West in 2010, the NFC South in 2014 and 2022, and the NFC East in 2020 have historically sent a worse division winner to the playoffs, when the Seahawks (themselves a former AFC West member) won that division with a 7–9 record, the Panthers won the NFC South division with a 7–8–1 record, the Washington Football Team won the NFC East division with a 7–9 record, and the Buccaneers won the NFC South with an 8–9 record. Along with the AFC (formerly AFL) East, the AFC West is the oldest NFL division in terms of creation date (1960).

== Results ==
=== Team success ===
Team success
Team	Years in division	Playoff berths	Division championships	AFC Championship Game appearances	Super Bowl appearances	Super Bowl wins	Refs
Denver Broncos	1970–present	23	16	11	8	3	
San Diego/Los Angeles Chargers	1970–present	19	15	4	1	0	
Kansas City Chiefs	1970–present	26	17	8	7	4	
Oakland/Los Angeles/Las Vegas Raiders	1970–present	23	15	11	5	3	
Seattle Seahawks	1977–2001	5	2	1	0	0	
Cincinnati Bengals	1968–1969	0	0	0	0	0	
Tampa Bay Buccaneers	1976	0	0	0	0	0	

=== Season results ===
^{(#)}	Denotes team that won the Super Bowl
^{(#)}	Denotes team that won the AFC Championship
^{(#)}	Denotes team that won the AFL Championship
^{(#)}	Denotes team that qualified for the NFL Playoffs or AFL Playoffs

Season	Team (record)				
Season	1st	2nd	3rd	4th	5th
AFL Western
1960: The AFL Western division formed with 4 members, the Dallas Texans, Denver Broncos, Los Angeles Chargers, and Oakland Raiders.
1960	L.A. Chargers (10–4)	Dal. Texans (8–6)	Oakland (6–8)	Denver (4–9–1)	
1961: The Los Angeles Chargers relocated to San Diego to become the San Diego Chargers.
1961	San Diego (12–2)	Dal. Texans (6–8)	Denver (3–11)	Oakland (2–12)	
1962	Dal. Texans (11–3)	Denver (7–7)	San Diego (4–10)	Oakland (1–13)	
1963: The Dallas Texans relocated to Kansas City to become the Kansas City Chiefs.
1963	San Diego (11–3)	Oakland (10–4)	Kansas City (5–7–2)	Denver (2–11–1)	
1964	San Diego (8–5–1)	Kansas City (7–7)	Oakland (5–7–2)	Denver (2–11–1)	
1965	San Diego (9–2–3)	Oakland (8–5–1)	Kansas City (7–5–2)	Denver (4–10)	
1966	Kansas City (11–2–1)	Oakland (8–5–1)	San Diego (7–6–1)	Denver (4–10)	
1967	Oakland (13–1)	Kansas City (9–5)	San Diego (8–5–1)	Denver (3–11)	
1968: The Cincinnati Bengals joined as an expansion team.
1968	Oakland (12–2)	Kansas City (12–2)	San Diego (9–5)	Denver (5–9)	Cincinnati (3–11)
1969	Oakland (12–1–1)	Kansas City (11–3)	San Diego (8–6)	Denver (5–8–1)	Cincinnati (4–9–1)
AFC West
1970: The Cincinnati Bengals leave the division and join the newly formed AFC Central as part of the NFL's realignment resulting from the AFL-NFL merger.
1970	Oakland (8–4–2)	Kansas City (7–5–2)	San Diego (5–6–3)	Denver (5–8–1)	
1971	Kansas City (10–3–1)	Oakland (8–4–2)	San Diego (6–8)	Denver (4–9–1)	
1972	Oakland (10–3–1)	Kansas City (8–6)	Denver (5–9)	San Diego (4–9–1)	
1973	Oakland (9–4–1)	Kansas City (7–5–2)	Denver (7–5–2)	San Diego (2–11–1)	
1974	Oakland (12–2)	Denver (7–6–1)	Kansas City (5–9)	San Diego (5–9)	
1975	^{(2)} Oakland (11–3)	Denver (6–8)	Kansas City (5–9)	San Diego (2–12)	
1976: The Tampa Bay Buccaneers joined as an expansion team.
1976	^{(1)} Oakland (13–1)	Denver (9–5)	San Diego (6–8)	Kansas City (5–9)	Tampa Bay (0–14)
1977: The Tampa Bay Buccaneers leave for NFC Central, Seattle Seahawks are moved to AFC West.
1977	^{(1)} Denver (12–2)	^{(4)} Oakland (11–3)	San Diego (7–7)	Seattle (5–9)	Kansas City (2–12)
1978	^{(3)} Denver (10–6)	Oakland (9–7)	Seattle (9–7)	San Diego (9–7)	Kansas City (4–12)
1979	^{(1)} San Diego (12–4)	^{(5)} Denver (10–6)	Seattle (9–7)	Oakland (9–7)	Kansas City (7–9)
1980	^{(1)} San Diego (11–5)	^{(4)} Oakland (11–5)	Kansas City (8–8)	Denver (8–8)	Seattle (4–12)
1981	^{(3)} San Diego (10–6)	Denver (10–6)	Kansas City (9–7)	Oakland (7–9)	Seattle (6–10)
1982: The Oakland Raiders relocated to Los Angeles to become the Los Angeles Raiders.
1982^	^{(1)} L.A. Raiders (8–1)	^{(5)} San Diego (6–3)	Seattle (4–5)	Kansas City (3–6)	Denver (2–7)
1983	^{(1)} L.A. Raiders (12–4)	^{(4)} Seattle (9–7)	^{(5)} Denver (9–7)	San Diego (6–10)	Kansas City (6–10)
1984	^{(2)} Denver (13–3)	^{(4)} Seattle (12–4)	^{(5)} L.A. Raiders (11–5)	Kansas City (8–8)	San Diego (7–9)
1985	^{(1)} L.A. Raiders (12–4)	Denver (11–5)	Seattle (8–8)	San Diego (8–8)	Kansas City (6–10)
1986	^{(2)} Denver (11–5)	^{(5)} Kansas City (10–6)	Seattle (10–6)	L.A. Raiders (8–8)	San Diego (4–12)
1987	^{(1)} Denver (10–4–1)	^{(5)} Seattle (9–6)	San Diego (8–7)	L.A. Raiders (5–10)	Kansas City (4–11)
1988	^{(3)} Seattle (9–7)	Denver (8–8)	L.A. Raiders (7–9)	San Diego (6–10)	Kansas City (4–11–1)
1989	^{(1)} Denver (11–5)	Kansas City (8–7–1)	L.A. Raiders (8–8)	Seattle (7–9)	San Diego (6–10)
1990	^{(2)} L.A. Raiders (12–4)	^{(5)} Kansas City (11–5)	Seattle (9–7)	San Diego (6–10)	Denver (5–11)
1991	^{(2)} Denver (12–4)	^{(4)} Kansas City (10–6)	^{(5)} L.A. Raiders (9–7)	Seattle (7–9)	San Diego (4–12)
1992	^{(3)} San Diego (11–5)	^{(6)} Kansas City (10–6)	Denver (8–8)	L.A. Raiders (7–9)	Seattle (2–14)
1993	^{(3)} Kansas City (11–5)	^{(4)} L.A. Raiders (10–6)	^{(5)} Denver (9–7)	San Diego (8–8)	Seattle (6–10)
1994	^{(2)} San Diego (11–5)	^{(6)} Kansas City (9–7)	L.A. Raiders (9–7)	Denver (7–9)	Seattle (6–10)
1995: The Los Angeles Raiders relocated back to Oakland after 13 seasons to become the Oakland Raiders.
1995	^{(1)} Kansas City (13–3)	^{(4)} San Diego (9–7)	Seattle (8–8)	Denver (8–8)	Oakland (8–8)
1996	^{(1)} Denver (13–3)	Kansas City (9–7)	San Diego (8–8)	Oakland (7–9)	Seattle (7–9)
1997	^{(1)} Kansas City (13–3)	^{(4)} Denver (12–4)	Seattle (8–8)	Oakland (4–12)	San Diego (4–12)
1998	^{(1)} Denver (14–2)	Oakland (8–8)	Seattle (8–8)	Kansas City (7–9)	San Diego (5–11)
1999	^{(3)} Seattle (9–7)	Kansas City (9–7)	San Diego (8–8)	Oakland (8–8)	Denver (6–10)
2000	^{(2)} Oakland (12–4)	^{(5)} Denver (11–5)	Kansas City (7–9)	Seattle (6–10)	San Diego (1–15)
2001	^{(3)} Oakland (10–6)	Seattle (9–7)	Denver (8–8)	Kansas City (6–10)	San Diego (5–11)
2002: The AFC West was realigned for 4 members. The Seattle Seahawks left to join the NFC West.
2002	^{(1)} Oakland (11–5)	Denver (9–7)	San Diego (8–8)	Kansas City (8–8)	
2003	^{(2)} Kansas City (13–3)	^{(6)} Denver (10–6)	Oakland (4–12)	San Diego (4–12)	
2004	^{(4)} San Diego (12–4)	^{(6)} Denver (10–6)	Kansas City (7–9)	Oakland (5–11)	
2005	^{(2)} Denver (13–3)	Kansas City (10–6)	San Diego (9–7)	Oakland (4–12)	
2006	^{(1)} San Diego (14–2)	^{(6)} Kansas City (9–7)	Denver (9–7)	Oakland (2–14)	
2007	^{(3)} San Diego (11–5)	Denver (7–9)	Kansas City (4–12)	Oakland (4–12)	
2008	^{(4)} San Diego (8–8)	Denver (8–8)	Oakland (5–11)	Kansas City (2–14)	
2009	^{(2)} San Diego (13–3)	Denver (8–8)	Oakland (5–11)	Kansas City (4–12)	
2010	^{(4)} Kansas City (10–6)	San Diego (9–7)	Oakland (8–8)	Denver (4–12)	
2011	^{(4)} Denver (8–8)	San Diego (8–8)	Oakland (8–8)	Kansas City (7–9)	
2012	^{(1)} Denver (13–3)	San Diego (7–9)	Oakland (4–12)	Kansas City (2–14)	
2013	^{(1)} Denver (13–3)	^{(5)} Kansas City (11–5)	^{(6)} San Diego (9–7)	Oakland (4–12)	
2014	^{(2)} Denver (12–4)	Kansas City (9–7)	San Diego (9–7)	Oakland (3–13)	
2015	^{(1)} Denver (12–4)	^{(5)} Kansas City (11–5)	Oakland (7–9)	San Diego (4–12)	
2016	^{(2)} Kansas City (12–4)	^{(5)} Oakland (12–4)	Denver (9–7)	San Diego (5–11)	
2017: The San Diego Chargers relocated back to Los Angeles after 56 seasons to become the Los Angeles Chargers.
2017	^{(4)} Kansas City (10–6)	L.A. Chargers (9–7)	Oakland (6–10)	Denver (5–11)	
2018	^{(1)} Kansas City (12–4)	^{(5)} L.A. Chargers (12–4)	Denver (6–10)	Oakland (4–12)	
2019	^{(2)} Kansas City (12–4)	Denver (7–9)	Oakland (7–9)	L.A. Chargers (5–11)	
2020: The Oakland Raiders relocated to Las Vegas to become the Las Vegas Raiders.
2020	^{(1)} Kansas City (14–2)	Las Vegas (8–8)	L.A. Chargers (7–9)	Denver (5–11)	
2021	^{(2)} Kansas City (12–5)	^{(5)} Las Vegas (10–7)	L.A. Chargers (9–8)	Denver (7–10)	
2022	^{(1)} Kansas City (14–3)	^{(5)} L.A. Chargers (10–7)	Las Vegas (6–11)	Denver (5–12)	
2023	^{(3)} Kansas City (11–6)	Las Vegas (8–9)	Denver (8–9)	L.A. Chargers (5–12)	
2024	^{(1)} Kansas City (15–2)	^{(5)} L.A. Chargers (11–6)	^{(7)} Denver (10–7)	Las Vegas (4–13)	
2025	^{(1)} Denver (14–3)	^{(7)} L.A. Chargers (11–6)	Kansas City (6–11)	Las Vegas (3–14)	
2026	Denver (7-2)	Kansas City (6-2)	Las Vegas (4-5)	L.A Chargers (0-8)	

== See also ==
- Broncos–Chargers rivalry
- Broncos–Chiefs rivalry
- Broncos–Raiders rivalry
- Chargers–Chiefs rivalry
- Chargers–Raiders rivalry
- Chiefs–Raiders rivalry

=== Former member rivalries ===
- Broncos–Seahawks rivalry
- Raiders–Seahawks rivalry
