= Broncos–Chiefs rivalry =

National Football League rivalry

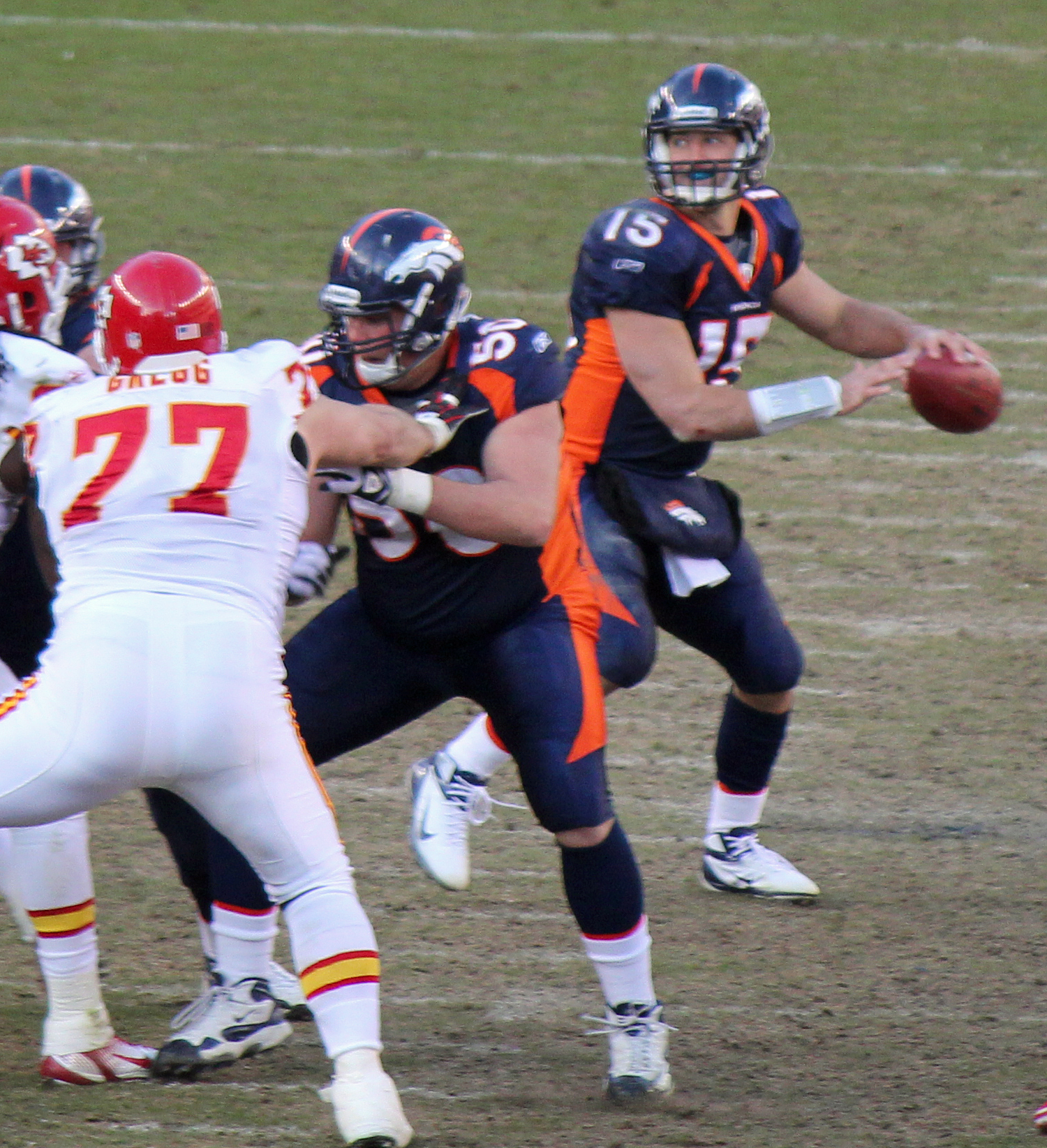
- Broncos and Chiefs face off in 2012.

- Denver Broncos Kansas City Chiefs
- Location: Denver, Kansas City
- First meeting: October 30, 1960; Texans 17, Broncos 14
- Latest meeting: November 1, 2026; Broncos 28, Chiefs 24
- Next meeting: 2027
- Stadiums: Broncos: Empower Field at Mile High; Chiefs: GEHA Field at Arrowhead Stadium

Statistics
- Total meetings: 134
- All-time series: Chiefs: 74–60
- Regular season series: Chiefs: 74–59
- Postseason results: Broncos: 1–0
- Largest victory: Broncos: 38–0 (2024); Chiefs: 59–7 (1963)
- Most points scored: Broncos: 49 (2010); Chiefs: 59 (1963)
- Longest win streak: Broncos: 8 (1976–1979); Chiefs: 16 (2015–2023)
- Current win streak: Broncos: 1 (2026–present)

Post-season history
- 1997 AFC Divisional: Broncos won: 14–10

The Broncos–Chiefs rivalry is a National Football League (NFL) rivalry between the Denver Broncos and Kansas City Chiefs.

Since the American Football League was established in 1960, the Broncos and the Chiefs have shared the same division, first being the AFL Western Conference, and since the AFL–NFL merger, the AFC West. For years, the rivalry has featured two of the best home-field advantages in the league. CBS ranked this rivalry as the No. 4 NFL rivalry of the 1990s in 2020.

The Dallas Texans/Kansas City Chiefs dominated the Broncos in the 1960s, the decade of the AFL, winning 19 of 20 games. The Texans won all six meetings in the rivalry's first three years before moving to Kansas City in 1963. The Broncos have responded since then, winning the series from the 1970s to 2000s. The Chiefs snapped this streak in the 2010s when they won 11–9.

In the 2010s, Peyton Manning went 7–1 against the Chiefs as a member of the Broncos from 2012 to 2015. The Chiefs took control of the series after defeating the Broncos in 2015 in the final meeting with Manning at quarterback, starting a 16-game win streak for Kansas City over Denver. Until 2023, the Chiefs had gone 15–0 against the Broncos since Manning retired following the 2015 season, and quarterback Patrick Mahomes won his first 12 career starts against Denver. Combined, the two teams have won the last 16 AFC West Division titles from 2010 through the end of the 2025 season, and were the only teams to win the AFC West in the 2010s.

The Chiefs lead the overall series, 74–60. The two teams have met once in the playoffs, with the Broncos winning.

== Notable moments ==
=== 1990–1994 ===
- September 17, 1990: In a game played at Mile High Stadium on Monday Night Football, the Broncos were trailing 23–21 with 1:44 left in the fourth quarter, after Chiefs' quarterback Steve DeBerg launched an 83-yard touchdown pass to wide receiver Stephone Paige to give the Chiefs their first lead of the game. Broncos' quarterback John Elway engineered a comeback, which culminated with kicker David Treadwell hitting a 22-yard field goal as time expired. The game is also remembered for Broncos' safety Steve Atwater applying a punishing hit to Chiefs' running back Christian Okoye.
- October 4, 1992: The Chiefs were victimized by 8 of John Elway's 46 fourth quarter comebacks/game-winning drives, the most he had against one NFL team. Perhaps the most memorable comeback occurred on October 4, 1992, at Mile High Stadium. The Broncos trailed 19–6 late in the fourth quarter, and had not scored a touchdown in the previous 12 quarters. After the 2-minute warning, Elway threw a 25-yard touchdown pass to wide receiver Mark Jackson to narrow the gap to 19–13 with 1:55 left. After the Chiefs subsequently went three-and-out, the Broncos returned a punt to the Chiefs' 27-yard line. Three plays later, Elway threw a 12-yard touchdown pass to wide receiver Vance Johnson with 38 seconds left for a thrilling 20–19 comeback win.
- December 27, 1992: Less than three months after John Elway stunned the Chiefs with the aforementioned comeback win, the Chiefs exacted revenge on the Broncos at Arrowhead Stadium in the 1992 regular season finale, with a playoff berth on the line. The Chiefs routed the Broncos 42–20, with the Chiefs' defense scoring three touchdowns off Broncos' turnovers, and denying the Broncos a playoff berth in the process.
- October 17, 1994: John Elway and Joe Montana, two of the three greatest quarterbacks in NFL history, squared off in one of the greatest games in Monday Night Football history. Montana played the last two years of his 16-year NFL career with the Chiefs (1993–94), after playing the majority of his career with the San Francisco 49ers (1979–1992). The two teams matched each other score for score through the first three quarters, until Chiefs' kicker Lin Elliott nailed a 19-yard field goal to give the Chiefs a 24–21 lead with four minutes remaining in the fourth quarter. After Broncos' tight end Shannon Sharpe and Chiefs' running back Marcus Allen traded fumbles over the next two possessions, Elway led the Broncos on a 6-play, 39-yard drive, and scored a 4-yard touchdown on a quarterback draw to give the Broncos a 28–24 lead with 1:29 remaining. However, the Chiefs would one-up the Broncos, with Montana connecting on a 5-yard touchdown pass to wide receiver Willie Davis with only eight seconds remaining to give the Chiefs a thrilling 31–28 win. It not only gave Chiefs' head coach Marty Schottenheimer his first victory in Denver in eight tries, but the Chiefs also snapped an 11-game losing streak at Mile High Stadium.
- December 4, 1994: In a game at Arrowhead Stadium, Broncos' defensive end Shane Dronett blocked a potential game-winning 37-yard field goal by Chiefs' placekicker Lin Elliott at the end of regulation, sending the game to overtime. Broncos' quarterback Hugh Millen, substituting for an injured John Elway, committed a fumble in Broncos' territory after being sacked by Chiefs' defensive end Darren Mickell; however, the Chiefs immediately returned the favor when running back Marcus Allen lost a fumble that was recovered by safety Dennis Smith at the Broncos' 27-yard line. Placekicker Jason Elam later kicked a 34-yard field goal with 2:48 remaining in overtime, for a Broncos' 20–17 victory.

=== 1997–present ===
- November 16, 1997: The Broncos were trailing the Chiefs 21–19 at Arrowhead Stadium, and were backed up at their own 27-yard line with two minutes remaining in the fourth quarter. Quarterback John Elway led the Broncos down the field, with Jason Elam kicking a 34-yard field goal with only a minute left to give the Broncos a 22–21 lead. However, Chiefs' quarterback Rich Gannon drove the Chiefs to the Broncos' 37-yard line, and kicker Pete Stoyanovich hit a 54-yard field goal as time expired to give the Chiefs a 24–22 win.
- January 4, 1998: A very hard-fought, yet controversial game. Less than two months after the aforementioned last-second win by the Chiefs, the Broncos returned to Kansas City for the divisional round of the 1997–98 NFL playoffs, and redeemed themselves by upending the No. 1 seed Chiefs 14–10, en route to their first Super Bowl win that season.
- October 5, 2003: Chiefs' return specialist Dante Hall returned a punt 93 yards for a touchdown in the fourth quarter, after it seemed that the Broncos' special teams had him corralled for a loss deep in Chiefs' territory. This gave the Chiefs a 24–23 win over the Broncos at Arrowhead Stadium.
- November 14, 2010: The Broncos stormed out to a 35–0 lead against the visiting Chiefs before the second half, leading to a 49–29 victory. Chiefs' head coach Todd Haley was distraught after the game and snubbed a postgame handshake with Broncos' head coach Josh McDaniels, thinking that the Broncos were running up the score on the Chiefs.
- September 17, 2015: The Broncos trailed 24–17 at Arrowhead Stadium with 2:27 left, when quarterback Peyton Manning engineered a 10-play, 80-yard drive, culminating in a game-tying 19-yard touchdown pass to wide receiver Emmanuel Sanders with 36 seconds left. The game appeared to be headed to overtime, until Broncos' linebacker Brandon Marshall forced Chiefs' running back Jamaal Charles to fumble on the next play from scrimmage. Cornerback Bradley Roby then returned the fumble 21 yards for a touchdown to give the Broncos a stunning 31–24 comeback win.
- November 15, 2015: Two months after the aforementioned Broncos' comeback win, the Chiefs exacted revenge in a dominating 29–13 win at Sports Authority Field at Mile High and ended a seven-game losing steak to the Broncos. Despite the anticipation of Peyton Manning becoming the NFL's all-time leader in regular season passing yardage, needing only three yards to do so, the Chiefs' defense held Manning to just 35 yards passing and intercepted him four times, giving him the only 0.0 passer rating of his career before being benched in the third quarter in favor of backup quarterback Brock Osweiler. Shortly after the game, it was revealed that Manning had been dealing with plantar fasciitis, which kept him out until Week 17. The game would prove to be the final regular season start of Manning's career as would be the backup for the Broncos once he came back from injury. Despite this loss and Manning's injury, however, the Broncos would eventually go onto win Super Bowl 50, but would not make the playoffs until 2024 as Manning retired following the season.
- November 27, 2016: The Chiefs were trailing 24–16 with three minutes left in regulation, when quarterback Alex Smith engineered a 13-play, 75-yard drive, culminating in a 3-yard touchdown pass to wide receiver Tyreek Hill, coupled with a game-tying two-point conversion with only 12 seconds remaining, sending the game to overtime. Hill previously returned a free kick 86 yards for a touchdown in the second quarter and also scored on a 3-yard touchdown run in the third quarter. After each team exchanged field goals in overtime — a 44-yarder by Broncos' placekicker Brandon McManus followed by a 37-yarder by Chiefs' placekicker Cairo Santos, the Broncos were trying to win the game with a highly criticized 62-yard field goal attempt by McManus, but the kick was both short and wide-left, giving the Chiefs possession at the Broncos' 48-yard line with 1:08 remaining. Four plays later, and with five seconds remaining, Santos kicked the game-winning 34-yard field goal for the Chiefs, which initially caromed off the left upright.
- October 1, 2018: On Monday Night Football in Denver, the Chiefs trailed 23–13 in the fourth quarter before Patrick Mahomes found Travis Kelce for a 2-yard score. The defense then held the Broncos to a three-and-out, giving the ball back to Mahomes, who led the team down the field, even avoiding a sack by Von Miller to throw the ball left-handed to Tyreek Hill for a first down. Kareem Hunt then scored the game-winning touchdown on a 4-yard rush with 1:39 remaining, giving Kansas City its fourth consecutive victory at Broncos Stadium at Mile High.
- January 8, 2022: In the 2021 regular season finale in Denver, the Broncos were holding a 21–20 lead midway through the fourth quarter, hoping to end a 12-game losing streak to the Chiefs. The Broncos were attempting to add to their lead, and marched deep into Chiefs' territory, when Chiefs' linebacker Melvin Ingram penetrated into the Broncos' backfield untouched, and forced a fumble off of Gordon. Linebacker Nick Bolton scooped up the football, and returned the fumble 86 yards for a game-changing touchdown and a 28–24 Chiefs' win.
- October 29, 2023: After losing 19–8 two weeks prior (which was their 16th straight loss against Kansas City), the Broncos beat the Chiefs 24–9 at Mile High, getting their first win against the Chiefs since Week 2 of the 2015 season.
- November 10, 2024: The Broncos were trailing 16–14 late in the fourth quarter, and were hoping to snap an 8-game losing streak in Kansas City with a game-winning field goal. However, placekicker Wil Lutz's 35-yard field goal attempt was blocked by Leo Chenal as time expired.

== Season-by-season results ==
Denver Broncos vs. Dallas Texans/Kansas City Chiefs Season-by-Season Results
1960s (Texans/Chiefs, 19–1)

Season	Season series	at Denver Broncos	at Dallas Texans/Kansas City Chiefs	Overall series	Notes
1960	Texans 2–0	Texans; 17–14	Texans; 34–7	Texans; 2–0	Inaugural season for both franchises and the American Football League (AFL).
1961	Texans 2–0	Texans; 19–12	Texans; 49–21	Texans; 4–0	
1962	Texans 2–0	Texans; 24–3	Texans; 17–10	Texans; 6–0	Last season Texans played as a Dallas-based team and under the "Texans" name. Texans win 1962 AFL Championship. Chiefs win all of their matchups against the Broncos while based in Dallas.
1963	Chiefs 2–0	Chiefs; 59–7	Chiefs; 52–21	Chiefs; 8–0	Texans relocate to Kansas City and rename themselves to the Kansas City Chiefs. In Denver, Chiefs set franchise records for their largest victory overall with a 52–point differential and their most points scored in a game. Meanwhile, the Broncos set a franchise record for their worst loss overall. Chiefs win 8 straight meetings (1960–1963).
1964	Tie 1–1	Broncos; 33–27	Chiefs; 49–39	Chiefs; 9–1	The Broncos' only victory against the Chiefs in the AFL.
1965	Chiefs 2–0	Chiefs; 31–23	Chiefs; 45–35	Chiefs; 11–1	
1966	Chiefs 2–0	Chiefs; 56–10	Chiefs; 37–10	Chiefs; 13–1	In Denver, Chiefs finish with 614 total yards, setting a franchise record for most yards in a game. Chiefs win 1966 AFL Championship, but lose Super Bowl I.
1967	Chiefs 2–0	Chiefs; 38–24	Chiefs; 52–9	Chiefs; 15–1	
1968	Chiefs 2–0	Chiefs; 30–7	Chiefs; 34–2	Chiefs; 17–1	
1969	Chiefs 2–0	Chiefs; 26–13	Chiefs; 31–17	Chiefs; 19–1	Game in Kansas City was played on Thanksgiving. Chiefs win 11 straight meetings (1964–1969). Chiefs win Super Bowl IV.

1970s (Broncos, 12–8)

Season	Season series	at Denver Broncos	at Kansas City Chiefs	Overall series	Notes
1970	Tie 1–1	Broncos; 26–13	Chiefs; 16–0	Chiefs; 20–2	As a result of the AFL–NFL merge, the Broncos and Chiefs are placed in the AFC West.
1971	Chiefs 2–0	Chiefs; 16–3	Chiefs; 28–10	Chiefs; 22–2	Chiefs finish 9-0 against Broncos in Municipal Stadium.
1972	Chiefs 2–0	Chiefs; 45–24	Chiefs; 24–21	Chiefs; 24–2	Chiefs open Arrowhead Stadium.
1973	Tie 1–1	Broncos; 14–10	Chiefs; 16–14	Chiefs; 25–3	Chiefs win 14 consecutive home meetings (1960–1973).
1974	Tie 1–1	Chiefs; 42–34	Broncos; 17–14	Chiefs; 26–4	Broncos record their first road win against the Chiefs.
1975	Tie 1–1	Broncos; 37–33	Chiefs; 26–13	Chiefs; 27–5	
1976	Broncos 2–0	Broncos; 17–16	Broncos; 35–26	Chiefs; 27–7	Broncos record their first season series sweep against the Chiefs.
1977	Broncos 2–0	Broncos; 23–7	Broncos; 14–7	Chiefs; 27–9	Broncos lose Super Bowl XII.
1978	Broncos 2–0	Broncos; 24–3	Broncos; 23–17 (OT)	Chiefs; 27–11	
1979	Broncos 2–0	Broncos; 20–3	Broncos; 24–10	Chiefs; 27–13	Broncos win eight consecutive meetings (1976–1979).

1980s (Broncos, 11–8)

Season	Season series	at Denver Broncos	at Kansas City Chiefs	Overall series	Notes
1980	Chiefs 2–0	Chiefs; 23–17	Chiefs; 31–14	Chiefs; 29–13	
1981	Tie 1–1	Broncos; 16–13	Chiefs; 28–14	Chiefs; 30–14	
1982	Chiefs 1–0	Chiefs; 37–16	canceled	Chiefs; 31–14	Due to the 1982 NFL players strike, the game scheduled in Kansas City was canceled.
1983	Tie 1–1	Broncos; 27–24	Chiefs; 48–17	Chiefs; 32–15	Broncos trade for QB John Elway.
1984	Tie 1–1	Broncos; 21–0	Chiefs; 16–13	Chiefs; 33–16	
1985	Broncos 2–0	Broncos; 14–13	Broncos; 30–10	Chiefs; 33–18	
1986	Tie 1–1	Broncos; 38–17	Chiefs; 37–10	Chiefs; 34–19	Broncos lose Super Bowl XXI.
1987	Broncos 2–0	Broncos; 20–17	Broncos; 26–17	Chiefs; 34–21	Broncos lose Super Bowl XXII.
1988	Tie 1–1	Broncos; 17–11	Chiefs; 20–13	Chiefs; 35–22	
1989	Broncos 2–0	Broncos; 34–20	Broncos; 16–13	Chiefs; 35–24	Broncos lose Super Bowl XXIV.

1990s (Broncos, 11–10)

Season	Season series	at Denver Broncos	at Kansas City Chiefs	Overall series	Notes
1990	Tie 1–1	Broncos; 24–23	Chiefs; 31–20	Chiefs; 36–25	In Denver, Broncos' K David Treadwell kicked a game-winning 22–yard field goal in the final seconds.
1991	Broncos 2–0	Broncos; 19–16	Broncos; 24–20	Chiefs; 36–27	
1992	Tie 1–1	Broncos; 20–19	Chiefs; 42–20	Chiefs; 37–28	In Denver, the Broncos overcame a 19–6 fourth quarter deficit in the final 5 minutes. The Chiefs clinch a playoff berth and eliminate the Broncos from playoff contention with their win.
1993	Tie 1–1	Broncos; 27–21	Chiefs; 15–7	Chiefs; 38–29	Broncos win 11 consecutive home meetings (1983–1993).
1994	Tie 1–1	Chiefs; 31–28	Broncos; 20–17 (OT)	Chiefs; 39–30	In Denver, Chiefs' QB Joe Montana leads the Chiefs to a dramatic win. In Kansas City, the Broncos blocked a potential game-winning 36-yard field goal to send the game into overtime, which saw the Broncos win on a 34-yard field goal.
1995	Chiefs 2–0	Chiefs; 21–7	Chiefs; 20–17	Chiefs; 41–30	The Chiefs' first season series sweep against the Broncos since 1980.
1996	Tie 1–1	Broncos; 34–7	Chiefs; 17–14	Chiefs; 42–31	
1997	Tie 1–1	Broncos; 19–3	Chiefs; 24–22	Chiefs; 43–32	Beginning with their win, the Broncos went on a 19-game home winning streak. In Kansas City, Chiefs' K Pete Stoyanovich kicked a game-winning 54-yard field goal.
1997 Playoffs	Broncos 1–0	—N/a	Broncos; 14–10	Chiefs; 43–33	AFC Divisional playoffs. Chiefs’ first home loss of the season, following an 8–0 regular-season record. Broncos go on to win Super Bowl XXXII.
1998	Broncos 2–0	Broncos; 35–31	Broncos; 30–7	Chiefs; 43–35	Broncos win Super Bowl XXXIII.
1999	Chiefs 2–0	Chiefs; 16–10	Chiefs; 26–10	Chiefs; 45–35	Chiefs' win in Denver snapped the Broncos' 12-game home winning streak against divisional opponents.

2000s (Broncos, 11–9)

Season	Season series	at Denver Broncos	at Kansas City Chiefs	Overall series	Notes
2000	Chiefs 2–0	Chiefs; 23–22	Chiefs; 20–7	Chiefs; 47–35	
2001	Tie 1–1	Broncos; 20–6	Chiefs; 26–23 (OT)	Chiefs; 48–36	Broncos open Invesco Field at Mile High (now known as Empower Field at Mile High).
2002	Broncos 2–0	Broncos; 31–24	Broncos; 37–34 (OT)	Chiefs; 48–38	In Kansas City, Broncos overcame a 34–20 fourth quarter deficit. Following that home loss, the Chiefs went on a 13-game home winning streak.
2003	Tie 1–1	Broncos; 45–27	Chiefs; 24–23	Chiefs; 49–39	In Kansas City, Chiefs' WR Dante Hall returned a punt for a 93-yard touchdown.
2004	Tie 1–1	Broncos; 34–24	Chiefs; 45–17	Chiefs; 50–40	
2005	Tie 1–1	Broncos; 30–10	Chiefs; 31–27	Chiefs; 51–41	
2006	Tie 1–1	Broncos; 9–6 (OT)	Chiefs; 19–10	Chiefs; 52–42	Game in Kansas City was played on Thanksgiving Day. Both teams finished with 9–7 record. Still, the Chiefs clinched the final playoff berth based on a better division record, eliminating the Broncos from contention.
2007	Broncos 2–0	Broncos; 41–7	Broncos; 27–11	Chiefs; 52–44	
2008	Tie 1–1	Broncos; 24–17	Chiefs; 33–19	Chiefs; 53–45	Chiefs' win snapped their 12-game losing streak. It was their only home win in the 2008 season. Broncos win eight straight home meetings (2001–2008).
2009	Tie 1–1	Chiefs; 44–24	Broncos; 44–13	Chiefs; 54–46	

2010s (Chiefs, 11–9)

Season	Season series	at Denver Broncos	at Kansas City Chiefs	Overall series	Notes
2010	Tie 1–1	Broncos; 49–29	Chiefs; 10–6	Chiefs; 55–47	In Denver, the Broncos score their most points against the Chiefs. Following the game, Chiefs' head coach Todd Haley refused to shake hands with Broncos' head coach Josh McDaniels.
2011	Tie 1–1	Chiefs; 7–3	Broncos; 17–10	Chiefs; 56–48	
2012	Broncos 2–0	Broncos; 38–3	Broncos; 17–9	Chiefs; 56–50	Broncos sign QB Peyton Manning.
2013	Broncos 2–0	Broncos; 27–17	Broncos; 35–28	Chiefs; 56–52	Broncos' home win gave the Chiefs their first loss of the season after a 9–0 start. Broncos lose Super Bowl XLVIII.
2014	Broncos 2–0	Broncos; 24–17	Broncos; 29–16	Chiefs; 56–54	
2015	Tie 1–1	Chiefs; 29–13	Broncos; 31–24	Chiefs; 57–55	In Kansas City, the Broncos score two touchdowns in the last three minutes to win. In Denver, Peyton Manning finished with a 0.0 passer rating. Broncos win Super Bowl 50.
2016	Chiefs 2–0	Chiefs; 30–27 (OT)	Chiefs; 33–10	Chiefs; 59–55	The game in Kansas City was played on Christmas, in which the Chiefs eliminated the Broncos from playoff contention with their win. Chiefs' first season series sweep against the Broncos since 2000.
2017	Chiefs 2–0	Chiefs; 27–24	Chiefs; 29–19	Chiefs; 61–55	Chiefs draft QB Patrick Mahomes, who makes his NFL debut in Denver. Starting with their win in Denver, the Chiefs went on a 16 road-game division winning streak.
2018	Chiefs 2–0	Chiefs; 27–23	Chiefs; 30–23	Chiefs; 63–55	
2019	Chiefs 2–0	Chiefs; 30–6	Chiefs; 23–3	Chiefs; 65–55	The Chiefs allow the fewest points in the season series since 1968. Chiefs win Super Bowl LIV.

2020s (Chiefs, 9–5)

Season	Season series	at Denver Broncos	at Kansas City Chiefs	Overall series	Notes
2020	Chiefs 2–0	Chiefs; 43–16	Chiefs; 22–16	Chiefs; 67–55	Chiefs lose Super Bowl LV.
2021	Chiefs 2–0	Chiefs; 28–24	Chiefs; 22–9	Chiefs; 69–55	
2022	Chiefs 2–0	Chiefs; 34–28	Chiefs; 27–24	Chiefs; 71–55	Chiefs win Super Bowl LVII.
2023	Tie 1–1	Broncos; 24–9	Chiefs; 19–8	Chiefs; 72–56	Chiefs won 16 straight meetings (2015–2023). With their win, Broncos record their first win against Chiefs' QB Patrick Mahomes after 12 meetings, gave Mahomes his first road defeat in the AFC West and snapped the Chiefs 16 road-game division winning streak. Chiefs win Super Bowl LVIII.
2024	Tie 1–1	Broncos; 38–0	Chiefs; 16–14	Chiefs; 73–57	In Kansas City, Chiefs block a potential game-winning field goal. In Denver, Broncos clinched their first postseason appearance since 2015 with their win, and record their largest victory against the Chiefs with a 38–point differential. Chiefs win nine straight home meetings (2016–2024). Chiefs lose Super Bowl LIX.
2025	Broncos 2–0	Broncos; 22–19	Broncos; 20–13	Chiefs; 73–59	Game in Kansas City was played on Christmas, with the Broncos winning in Kansas City for the first time since 2015 and recording their first season series sweep of the Chiefs since 2014. Broncos clinch AFC West title with Chargers loss' to the Texans, becoming the first AFC West team other than the Chiefs to win the division since 2015.
2026	Tie 1–1	Broncos; 28–24	Chiefs; 31–10	Chiefs; 74–60	In Denver, Broncos overcome an 11-point deficit in the 4th quarter.

Summary of Results

Season	Season series	at Denver Broncos	at Dallas Texans/Kansas City Chiefs	Notes
AFL regular season	Chiefs 19–1	Chiefs 9–1	Chiefs 10–0	The Texans/Chiefs have a 3–0 record in Dallas.
NFL regular season	Broncos 58–55	Broncos 38–19	Chiefs 36–20	
AFL and NFL regular season	Chiefs 74–59	Broncos 39–28	Chiefs 46–20	
NFL postseason	Broncos 1–0	No games	Broncos 1–0	AFC Divisional: 1997
Regular and postseason	Chiefs 74–60	Broncos 39–28	Chiefs 46–21	

== See also ==
- List of NFL rivalries
- AFC West
