= NFL on Christmas Day =

NFL games on Christmas

Games held by the National Football League (NFL) on Christmas Day, December 25, were historically an infrequent part of the league's schedule, but have been an annual occurrence since 2020. Prior to then the NFL had avoided annual Christmas Day games because the holiday could fall on a day in which the league does not normally schedule games, in contrast to Thanksgiving Day games since Thanksgiving is always on a Thursday. The NFL held two Divisional Playoff games on Christmas Day in 1971 when the regular season only spanned a 14-week period. This proved unpopular, and the league avoided Christmas Day games until 1989 to 2019, when the NFL typically scheduled games on Christmas Day if it fell on a Saturday, Sunday, or Monday. Since 2020, the league has scheduled at least one Christmas game every season, even when the holiday falls on a day in which the NFL does not usually schedule games.

As of the 2025 season, there have been 35 Christmas Day games in the NFL's history, all broadcast nationally. Two games were scheduled each Christmas Day from 2004 to 2006, 2016 to 2017, 2021, and 2024. Three games were scheduled each year beginning in 2022, with the exception of 2024.

Generally when Christmas Day falls on a Thursday, the day's games will include the standard Thursday Night Football broadcast. When Christmas Day falls on a Sunday, it will likewise include the standard Sunday Night Football telecast, but the normal slate of Sunday afternoon games is instead moved to Saturday, Christmas Eve. If Christmas Day falls on a Monday, the normal slate of Sunday afternoon games is still played on Christmas Eve, and the normal Monday Night Football broadcast is still on Christmas night, but the Sunday Night Football telecast has been moved to either Monday afternoon or to Saturday, December 23 (with up to two games on both of those days).

== History ==
=== Early years ===
In the earliest days of professional football, the season typically ended near the end of November (marquee games were often played on Thanksgiving) or in the first week of December, depending on the team; exhibition games would then be held in the winter. Once league schedules were standardized in the 1930s, the NFL Championship Game was typically held in mid-December. The 1943 NFL Championship Game, played on December 26 of that year because of scheduling complications brought on by World War II, was the first regulation NFL game to be played on or after Christmas.

From 1943 until the 1970 AFL–NFL Merger, the NFL regular season usually ended in mid-December, with the NFL Championship Game being held on the Sunday two weeks later. If that Sunday fell on Christmas Day, December 25, the league preferred to move it to the following day, Monday, December 26; this rescheduling occurred for both the 1955 and the 1960 championship games.

The American Football League (AFL) compensated differently: the 1960 championship game was moved back by a full week, being played on New Year's Day 1961, with Christmas Sunday being an off-week. (The NFL's 1966 championship game was also held on Sunday, January 1, 1967, two weeks after the end of the regular season.) New Year's Day was an available day since the college bowl games are moved back to Monday, January 2, in years in which January 1 falls on a Sunday. The AFL had scheduled the 1966 championship game for Monday afternoon, December 26, but when the two leagues agreed to merge in 1970 and play a "world Championship game" starting with the 1966 season, the AFL game was moved back to Sunday, January 1.

=== 1971 Divisional Playoffs ===
The first NFL games actually played on December 25 came after the merger, during the 1971–72 NFL playoffs. The first two games of the divisional playoff round were held on Christmas Day; the first of these was between the Dallas Cowboys and the Minnesota Vikings, while the second of the two contests played that afternoon, the Miami Dolphins versus the Kansas City Chiefs, wound up being the longest game in NFL history. Because of the length of the latter game, the NFL received numerous complaints, reportedly due to the fact that it caused havoc with Christmas dinners around the nation. The NFL also came under fire from some quarters for intruding on a traditional religious and family holiday, and a Kansas state legislator proposed a bill to ban the scheduling of future games on December 25. As a result, the NFL decided to not schedule any Christmas Day games for the next 17 seasons.

=== 1972–1988: Avoiding Christmas Day ===
This required considerable effort during those years in which Christmas Day fell on a Saturday or a Sunday, given that ordinarily those days would be days in which NFL playoff games were to be held.

In 1976, the NFL opened its regular season a week earlier than would have ordinarily been the case (September 12, the second Sunday of the month, rather than the customary third Sunday) so that the divisional playoffs could be held on December 18 and 19 instead of December 25 and 26, and thus no games would be needed on Saturday, December 25 (Super Bowl XI was subsequently played on January 9, the earliest date in Super Bowl history).

In 1977, with Christmas Day falling on a Sunday, the divisional playoff games were held around the holiday, with an AFC doubleheader on Saturday, December 24, and an NFC doubleheader on Monday, December 26. This was done so that one team did not have a two-day rest advantage over the other for the conference championship games (the NFL only allowed one-day rest advantages). This scheduling resulted in most of the country missing the majority of the first quarter of the Pittsburgh Steelers–Denver Broncos game telecast (beginning at 4:00 p.m. EST), since the early AFC game that Saturday (Oakland Raiders–Baltimore Colts, beginning at 12:30 p.m. EST) went into double overtime; with an ordinary schedule of one game from each conference, viewers would have had the option of switching channels (or using a VCR), but in this case NBC simply stayed with the Raiders–Colts game (except in the Pittsburgh and Denver markets) and had to overlap its telecasts.

The NFL continued to avoid Christmas Day even after it started to extend the length of the regular season and the playoffs. The league expanded to a 16-game regular season and a 10-team playoff tournament in 1978, but it was not until 1982 that the regular season ended after Christmas Day. It was originally scheduled to end that year on Sunday, December 26, but the regular season was extended to Sunday, January 2, 1983, after the 57-day NFL players' strike reduced the season from 16 games to 9. The NFL compensated by extending the regular season one week and eliminating the off week between the conference championships and the Super Bowl.

In 1983 and again in 1988, the NFL split the first round wild card playoffs between Saturday, December 24, and Monday, December 26, to avoid a Christmas Day game.

Had the United States Football League (USFL) survived to play its autumn 1986 season, it would have featured the first major professional football games to be played in the regular season on Christmas Day; the USFL planned a complete set of four games for December 25. The USFL suspended operations prior to the 1986 season and the games were never played.

=== 1989–2020: Occasional regular season games on Christmas Day ===
Finally, in 1989, the NFL tried another Christmas Day game, Cincinnati at Minnesota, but it was a 9:00 p.m. EST Monday Night Football contest on ABC, thereby avoiding interfering with family dinners. The NFL pushed the regular season back one week in 1989 as a one-off experiment, meaning Christmas Day would fall during the last week of the regular season instead of the first round of the playoffs. The league added a bye week to its schedule in 1990, making Christmas Day permanently fall during the regular season. In the years since, the NFL has played an occasional late-afternoon or night game on the holiday, but the league did not schedule a Christmas Day game starting earlier than 3:30 p.m. local time (for either participating team) from 1971 through 2021.

When Christmas Day landed on a Thursday during this period, no games were scheduled even though the league began regularly scheduling late-season Thursday Night Football games in 2006. This was because it landed in Week 17, which was the final week of the season. Any playoff team playing its final regular season game on Thursday would have had a significant competitive advantage with the extra rest heading into the postseason.

The league did, however, hold rare Friday games on Christmas Day in 2009 and 2020, both of which were considered special editions of Thursday Night Football.

=== 2021–present: Multiple Christmas Day games annually ===
The NFL has staged at least two Christmas Day game each season since 2021, even in years in which Christmas Day falls on a day the league typically does not play. This became largely a result after the NFL expanded from a 16-game schedule to 17 games, putting the holiday on either the third- or second-to-last week of the regular season.

When December 25 again fell on a Sunday in 2022, the NFL scheduled three Christmas Day games for the first time. The 2022 Christmas Day games consisted of single contests for each Sunday network—Fox at the 1:00 p.m. ET early slot, CBS in the late game slot at 4:30 p.m. ET, and Sunday Night Football. The CBS game included an alternate, youth-oriented broadcast on sister network Nickelodeon, after having previously aired wild card games in such a manner.

Under the NFL's next round of television deals, which began in 2023 and will run through 2033, Fox acquired the rights to air special Christmas Day games as the schedule permits. These special games are in addition to standard primetime games on Christmas (such as Thursday Night Football, Sunday Night Football, and Monday Night Football in years in which the holiday lands on those days). With December 25 landing on a Monday in 2023, the NFL scheduled another tripleheader, once again consisting of national CBS and Fox games, along with Monday Night Football. For the second consecutive season, Nickelodeon aired an alternate, youth-oriented broadcast of CBS's game.

With December 25 landing on a Wednesday in 2024, the league originally told The Wall Street Journal in December 2023 that it would not play games when Christmas Day falls on Tuesdays or Wednesdays. However, on March 26, 2024, the NFL reversed course and announced a three-year agreement with Netflix to nationally stream two Christmas Day games in 2024, and at least one holiday game in both 2025 and 2026. The Baltimore Ravens, Houston Texans, Pittsburgh Steelers, and two-time defending Super Bowl champion Kansas City Chiefs were selected for the 2024 games. The Netflix games aired on local television affiliates in each respective team's television markets per NFL regulations. All four teams played the previous Saturday to make the turnaround between games similar to that of a Sunday to Thursday night contest. The first ever halftime show for Christmas Gameday was headlined by Beyoncé on Christmas Day.

According to The Washington Post in February 2025, the Kansas City Chiefs proposed to the league to play on Christmas every year, though it was unclear whether the league's other franchises would agree to the proposal. In April, the NFL's vice president of broadcast planning and scheduling, Mike North, stated that the league would likely not to commit to a permanent host for Christmas.

With December 25 landing on a Thursday in 2025 for the first time since the expansion of the season, the league returned to a tripleheader of games, with Netflix airing two games in the afternoon and Prime Video airing a primetime game as part of its usual Thursday Night Football package. NFL commissioner Roger Goodell also stated that a Christmas tripleheader would remain an annual tradition moving forward.

During Netflix’s coverage of one of their afternoon games between the Detroit Lions and the Minnesota Vikings, the second ever halftime show for Christmas Gameday was held at U.S. Bank Stadium in Minneapolis, Minnesota. The show was headlined by Snoop Dogg alongside special guests George Clinton, Martha Stewart, the singing voices of Huntrix (Ejae, Audrey Nuna, and Rei Ami) from Netflix’s animated film KPop Demon Hunters, Lainey Wilson, and Andrea and Matteo Bocelli.

2026 saw another tripleheader of games on Christmas Day, this year landing on a Friday for the first time since 2020. Per usual, Netflix streamed two games in the afternoon while Fox aired the primetime game, marking the first Christmas Day game the NFL has played on broadcast television since 2023.

== Game results ==
=== 1971 divisional round ===
Season	Visiting team		Home team		Stadium	TV	Game notes
1971	Dallas Cowboys	20	Minnesota Vikings	12	Metropolitan Stadium	CBS	Rivalry
1971	Miami Dolphins	27^{2OT}	Kansas City Chiefs	24	Municipal Stadium	NBC	Longest NFL game

=== Regular season ===
Season	Visiting team		Home team		Stadium	TV/streaming	Game notes
1989	Cincinnati Bengals	21	Minnesota Vikings	29	Metrodome	ABC	—N/a
1993	Houston Oilers	10	San Francisco 49ers	7	Candlestick Park	NBC	—N/a
1994	Detroit Lions	20	Miami Dolphins	27	Joe Robbie Stadium	ESPN	—N/a
1995	Dallas Cowboys	37	Arizona Cardinals	13	Sun Devil Stadium	ABC	—N/a
1999	Denver Broncos	17	Detroit Lions	7	Pontiac Silverdome	CBS	—N/a
2000	Dallas Cowboys	0	Tennessee Titans	31	Adelphia Coliseum	ABC	—N/a
2004	Oakland Raiders	30	Kansas City Chiefs	31	Arrowhead Stadium	CBS	Rivalry
2004	Denver Broncos	37	Tennessee Titans	16	The Coliseum	ESPN	—N/a
2005	Chicago Bears	24	Green Bay Packers	17	Lambeau Field	Fox	Rivalry
2005	Minnesota Vikings	23	Baltimore Ravens	30	M&T Bank Stadium	ESPN	—N/a
2006	Philadelphia Eagles	23	Dallas Cowboys	7	Texas Stadium	NBC	Rivalry
2006	New York Jets	13	Miami Dolphins	10	Dolphin Stadium	ESPN	Rivalry
2009	San Diego Chargers	42	Tennessee Titans	17	LP Field	NFLN	—N/a
2010	Dallas Cowboys	26	Arizona Cardinals	27	University of Phoenix Stadium	NFLN	—N/a
2011	Chicago Bears	21	Green Bay Packers	35	Lambeau Field	NBC	2010 NFC Championship Game rematch; rivalry
2016	Baltimore Ravens	27	Pittsburgh Steelers	31	Heinz Field	NFLN	Rivalry
2016	Denver Broncos	10	Kansas City Chiefs	33	Arrowhead Stadium	NBC	Rivalry
2017	Pittsburgh Steelers	34	Houston Texans	6	NRG Stadium	NBC/NFLN/Prime Video	—N/a
2017	Oakland Raiders	10	Philadelphia Eagles	19	Lincoln Financial Field	ESPN	—N/a
2020	Minnesota Vikings	33	New Orleans Saints	52	Mercedes-Benz Superdome	Fox/NFLN/Prime Video	2019 NFC wild-card round rematch; rivalry
2021	Cleveland Browns	22	Green Bay Packers	24	Lambeau Field	Fox/NFLN/Prime Video	—N/a
2021	Indianapolis Colts	22	Arizona Cardinals	16	State Farm Stadium	NFLN	—N/a
2022	Green Bay Packers	26	Miami Dolphins	20	Hard Rock Stadium	Fox	—N/a
2022	Denver Broncos	14	Los Angeles Rams	51	SoFi Stadium	CBS/Nickelodeon	—N/a
2022	Tampa Bay Buccaneers	19^{OT}	Arizona Cardinals	16	State Farm Stadium	NBC	—N/a
2023	Las Vegas Raiders	20	Kansas City Chiefs	14	Arrowhead Stadium	CBS/Nickelodeon	Rivalry
2023	New York Giants	25	Philadelphia Eagles	33	Lincoln Financial Field	Fox	2022 NFC divisional round rematch; rivalry
2023	Baltimore Ravens	33	San Francisco 49ers	19	Levi's Stadium	ABC	—N/a
2024	Kansas City Chiefs	29	Pittsburgh Steelers	10	Acrisure Stadium	Netflix	—N/a
2024	Baltimore Ravens	31	Houston Texans	2	NRG Stadium	Netflix	2023 AFC divisional round rematch
2025	Dallas Cowboys	30	Washington Commanders	23	Northwest Stadium	Netflix	Rivalry
2025	Detroit Lions	10	Minnesota Vikings	23	U.S. Bank Stadium	Netflix	Rivalry
2025	Denver Broncos	20	Kansas City Chiefs	13	Arrowhead Stadium	Prime Video	Rivalry
2026	Green Bay Packers		Chicago Bears		Soldier Field	Netflix	2025 NFC wild-card round rematch; Rivalry
2026	Buffalo Bills		Denver Broncos		Empower Field at Mile High	Netflix	2025 AFC divisional round rematch
2026	Los Angeles Rams		Seattle Seahawks		Lumen Field	Fox	2025 NFC Championship Game rematch; rivalry

== All-time standings ==
Team	GP	W	L	T	PCT
Philadelphia Eagles	3	3	0	0	1.000
Indianapolis Colts	1	1	0	0	1.000
Los Angeles Chargers	1	1	0	0	1.000
Los Angeles Rams	1	1	0	0	1.000
New Orleans Saints	1	1	0	0	1.000
New York Jets	1	1	0	0	1.000
Tampa Bay Buccaneers	1	1	0	0	1.000
Baltimore Ravens	4	3	1	0	.750
Green Bay Packers	4	3	1	0	.750
Pittsburgh Steelers	3	2	1	0	.667
Denver Broncos	5	3	2	0	.600
Dallas Cowboys	6	3	3	0	.500
Kansas City Chiefs	6	3	3	0	.500
Miami Dolphins	4	2	2	0	.500
Tennessee Titans	4	2	2	0	.500
Chicago Bears	2	1	1	0	.500
Minnesota Vikings	5	2	3	0	.400
Las Vegas Raiders	3	1	2	0	.333
Arizona Cardinals	4	1	3	0	.250
Cincinnati Bengals	1	0	1	0	.000
Cleveland Browns	1	0	1	0	.000
New York Giants	1	0	1	0	.000
Washington Commanders	1	0	1	0	.000
Houston Texans	2	0	2	0	.000
San Francisco 49ers	2	0	2	0	.000
Detroit Lions	3	0	3	0	.000

== See also ==
- NFL on Thanksgiving Day
