= Chiefs–Raiders rivalry =

National Football League rivalry

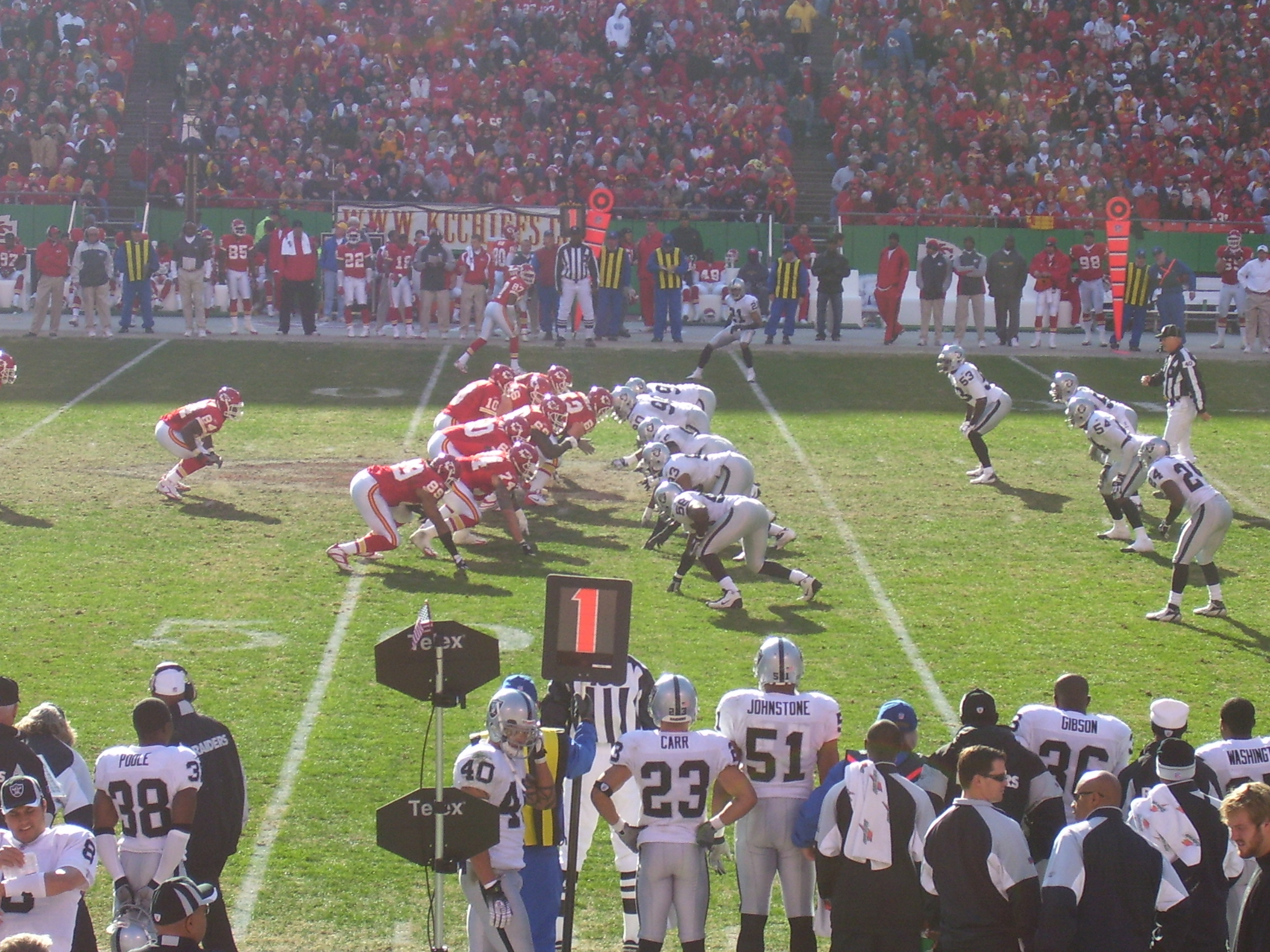
- Chiefs and Raiders face off during the 2006 season.

- Kansas City Chiefs Las Vegas Raiders
- Location: Kansas City, Las Vegas
- First meeting: September 16, 1960; Texans 34, Raiders 16
- Latest meeting: October 4, 2026; Chiefs 30, Raiders 27
- Next meeting: January 9/10, 2027
- Stadiums: Chiefs: Arrowhead Stadium; Raiders: Allegiant Stadium

Statistics
- Total meetings: 135
- All-time series: Chiefs: 77–56–2
- Regular season series: Chiefs: 75–55–2
- Postseason results: Chiefs: 2–1
- Largest victory: Chiefs: 48–9 (2021); Raiders: 41–6 (1968)
- Most points scored: Chiefs: 56 (2013); Raiders: 49 (2000)
- Longest win streak: Chiefs: 9 (2003–2007); Raiders: 7 (1975–1978)
- Current win streak: Chiefs: 1 (2026–present)

Post–season history
- 1968 AFL Western Division: Raiders won: 41–6; 1969 AFL Championship Game: Chiefs won: 17–7; 1991 AFC Wild Card: Chiefs won: 10–6

The Chiefs–Raiders rivalry is a National Football League (NFL) rivalry between the Kansas City Chiefs and Las Vegas Raiders.

The rivalry between the Chiefs and Raiders is considered to be one of the NFL's most bitter rivalries. Since the American Football League (AFL) was established in 1960, the Chiefs and Raiders have shared the same division, first being the AFL Western Conference, and since the AFL–NFL merger in 1970, the AFC West.

The Chiefs lead the overall series, 77–56–2. The two teams have met three times in the playoffs, with the Chiefs holding a 2–1 record.

== History ==
The teams first met in 1960 when the Chiefs were known as the Dallas Texans. The Texans defeated the Raiders 34–16 in the team's first game at Oakland, then the Raiders defeated the Texans 20–19 at Dallas.

The rivalry did not become so apparent until the Kansas City Athletics baseball team moved to Oakland, California, in 1968. In 1969, the Kansas City Royals expansion team was placed in the same division as the Athletics. The 1966 Chiefs team participated in the first AFL-NFL World Championship Game, later known as the Super Bowl. The Chiefs and Raiders had identical 12–2 records in 1968 and faced off in a playoff game to decide who would go to face the New York Jets for the AFL Championship. The Raiders won, 41–6.

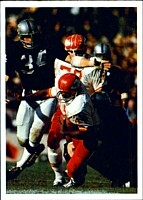
The Raiders playing the Chiefs in the 1969 AFL championship game

The following year, in 1969, the Raiders beat the Chiefs twice in the regular season and went on to win the AFL Western Conference title. The teams met in the 1969 AFL Championship Game at Oakland and the underdog Chiefs won 17–7. The Chiefs participated in Super Bowl IV a week later and defeated the NFL's heavily favored Minnesota Vikings. It was not until 1976 that Oakland won their first Super Bowl championship.

In the first meeting between the teams during the 1970 NFL season—both teams' first in the newly merged NFL—the Chiefs held a 17–14 lead late in the fourth quarter and appeared ready to run out the clock. Chiefs quarterback Len Dawson rolled right and gained enough yardage for a first down, and as he fell to the ground, Raiders defensive end Ben Davidson dove into Dawson with his helmet; in retaliation, Davidson was attacked by Chiefs wide receiver Otis Taylor. After a bench-clearing brawl, Davidson and Taylor were ejected, and the penalties that were called nullified the first down under the rules at the time. Kansas City was forced to punt. The Raiders took advantage, as George Blanda made a 48-yard field goal with 8 seconds left to secure a 17–17 tie. The tie proved to be costly for the Chiefs, as Oakland clinched their first AFC West championship with a 20–6 victory in Oakland in Week 13. Due to this incident, the NFL changed the rules so that Davidson's personal foul would have been enforced at the end of the play, and Taylor's penalty would have been assessed only after the Chiefs had been awarded a first down.

The Chiefs defeated the Raiders 42–10 in the 1975 season, prompting the Chiefs' live horse mascot Warpaint to circle the field after each touchdown scored. After the game, Raiders coach John Madden said "We couldn't beat the Chiefs, but we damn near killed their horse." It was the first win for new Chiefs coach Paul Wiggin.

The Raiders won two more Super Bowl titles in 1980 and 1983 while the Chiefs were considered to be one of the worst teams in the NFL. The Raiders won most of the games between the 1970s and 1980s. Following their victory in Super Bowl IV, the Chiefs returned to the playoffs in 1971, but lost in double overtime to the Miami Dolphins in the divisional round in the longest game in NFL history, the final game at Kansas City's Municipal Stadium. Following that loss, Kansas City did not return to the playoffs until 1986.

In the final game of the 1999 season, the Chiefs and Raiders faced off at Kansas City. A win for the Chiefs would put them in the playoffs. A game plagued by special teams mistakes for the Chiefs, including three attempted kickoffs that ended up out of bounds by kickoff specialist Jon Baker, helped keep the Raiders in the game and stop the Chiefs from sealing the victory. The game went into overtime and, helped by favorable field position after the third and final kickoff out of bounds, former Chief Rich Gannon drove the Raiders into Chiefs territory, setting up the game-winning field goal and knocking the Chiefs out of the playoffs, their first win at Arrowhead since 1988.

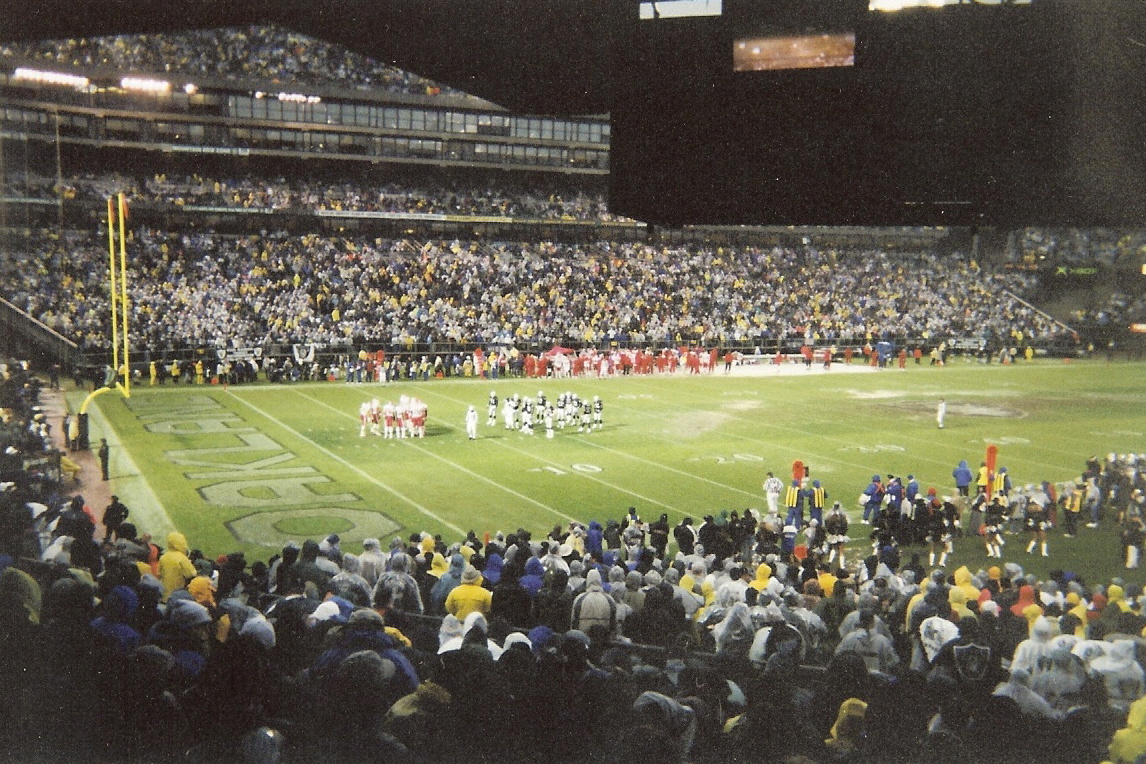
Kansas City at Oakland, 2002.

On October 21, 2007, the Chiefs defeated the Raiders for a record ninth straight victory. On November 25, 2007, the Raiders defeated the Chiefs in Arrowhead for Oakland's first victory over Kansas City since December 23, 2002.

On September 14, 2008, the Raiders defeated the Chiefs 23–8 for the second straight time in Kansas City. Rookie Darren McFadden compiled 210 rushing yards and a touchdown. On November 30, 2008, the Chiefs defeated the Raiders for the sixth straight time in Oakland.

On September 20, 2009, the Raiders defeated the Chiefs 13–10, in Kansas City for the third straight time. The Chiefs became one of the few teams to lose to quarterback JaMarcus Russell. On November 15, 2009, the Chiefs defeated the Raiders 16–10 in Oakland Coliseum for the Chiefs' seventh straight victory in Oakland.

On November 7, 2010, the Raiders defeated the Chiefs in OT 23–20 in a match-up that revived the Chiefs–Raiders rivalry. It marked the 99th time these teams have met in the regular season and 102nd overall. On January 2, 2011, the Raiders defeated the Chiefs in Kansas City for the fourth straight time, 31–10, to finish a sweep of the AFC West.

On October 3, 2011, a Raiders fan filed a lawsuit against the Chiefs and two unidentified Chiefs fans, claiming that security did nothing as he was beaten during a brawl at Kansas City in 2009.

The Chiefs broke Oakland's six-game winning streak in Kansas City on October 13, 2013, when they defeated the Raiders, 24–7, in a game where Kansas City set a then world record for the loudest open-air venue at over 137 dB.

On November 20, 2014, the Raiders snapped a 16-game losing streak in Oakland against the Chiefs while Kansas City was in a four-game winning streak the week after the Chiefs defeated the defending Super Bowl champions, the Seattle Seahawks. The loss ended up costing Kansas City a playoff berth.

In 2015, the Kansas City Chiefs swept the season series between these two teams.

In 2016, both teams were at the top of the AFC for the entire season, with Oakland securing their first winning season and first playoff appearance since 2002. The Chiefs beat Oakland twice, 26–10 in Oakland and in Kansas City 21–13. Both teams ended the regular season with a 12–4 record and with the series sweep, Kansas City won the AFC West and a first round bye while Oakland was relegated to Wild Card status and the fifth seed in the AFC playoffs.

The Chiefs and Raiders met for a Thursday Night match-up on October 19, 2017, in Oakland, with the Chiefs at a 5–1 record and the Raiders at a 2–4 record. The Raiders won the game 31–30 with a touchdown pass at the very end of the game, which followed two Chiefs defensive penalties, also including a scuffle between the two teams that led to Raiders running back Marshawn Lynch getting ejected. The game snapped a four-game losing streak for Oakland in the season, and also a five-game losing streak against the Chiefs in the rivalry.

In Week 5 of the 2020 season, the rivalry between the two teams was renewed when the 2–2 Raiders went to Arrowhead Stadium and upset the undefeated Chiefs 40–32, snapping a 5-game losing streak against the Chiefs dating back to 2017. It was the Raiders' first win in Arrowhead since 2012, with Derek Carr passing for 347 yards and three touchdowns, while Patrick Mahomes had 340 yards and two touchdowns, but had a costly third-quarter interception that led to a critical Raiders touchdown. It was Mahomes' first loss to the Raiders, and first loss since losing to the Tennessee Titans in Week 10 of the 2019 season.

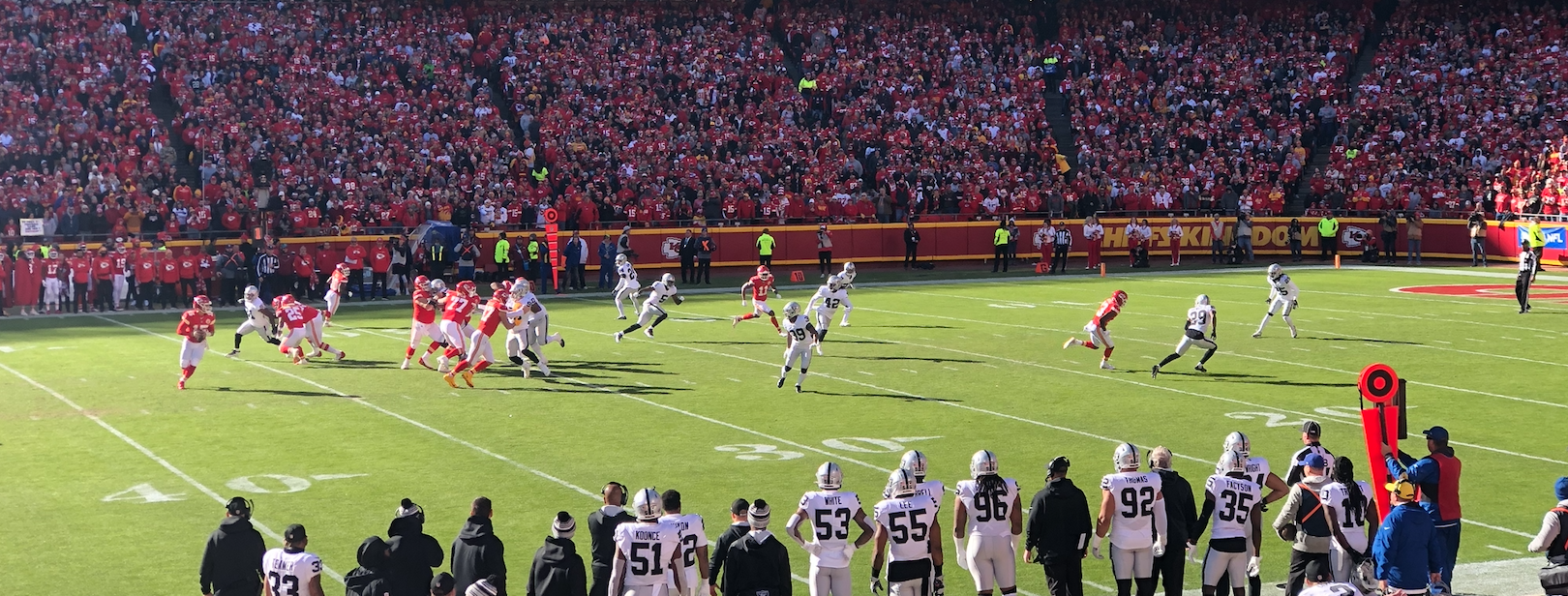
Las Vegas at Kansas City, 2021.

On November 22, 2020, the two teams met in Las Vegas for the first time on Sunday Night Football. With 1:07 left in the game, Derek Carr threw a touchdown pass to Jason Witten to give the Raiders a 31–28 lead, but Patrick Mahomes lead a 75-yard drive culminating in a 23-yard touchdown pass to Travis Kelce with 28 seconds left that gave the Chiefs a 35–31 win, officially renewing a spark in the rivalry between the two teams. After, the Chiefs went on to finish the season 14–2, losing to the Buccaneers in Super Bowl LV, while the Raiders, who were 6–3 leading up to this game, began a painful late-season collapse, as they would lose four of their last six games to end the season 8–8 and out of the playoffs.

On Christmas Day 2023, the Raiders defense helped snap another 5-game losing streak against the Chiefs.

== Season-by-season results ==
Dallas Texans/Kansas City Chiefs vs. Oakland/Los Angeles/Las Vegas Raiders Season-by-Season Results
1960s (Tie, 11–11)

Season	Season series	at Dallas Texans/Kansas City Chiefs	at Oakland Raiders	Overall series	Notes
1960	Tie 1–1	Raiders; 20–19	Texans; 34–16	Tie; 1–1	Inaugural season for both franchises and the American Football League (AFL). Both teams are placed in the Western Division, becoming divisional rivals. Texans record their first road win in franchise history.
1961	Texans 2–0	Texans; 43–11	Texans; 42–35	Texans; 3–1	
1962	Texans 2–0	Texans; 35–7	Texans; 26–16	Texans; 5–1	Last season Texans played as a Dallas-based team. Texans win 1962 AFL Championship.
1963	Raiders 2–0	Raiders; 22–7	Raiders; 10–7	Chiefs; 5–3	Texans relocate to Kansas City and rename themselves to the Kansas City Chiefs.
1964	Chiefs 2–0	Chiefs; 42–7	Chiefs; 21–9	Chiefs; 7–3	
1965	Tie 1–1	Chiefs; 14–7	Raiders; 37–10	Chiefs; 8–4	
1966	Tie 1–1	Raiders; 34–13	Chiefs; 32–10	Chiefs; 9–5	Chiefs win 1966 AFL Championship, but lose Super Bowl I.
1967	Raiders 2–0	Raiders; 44–22	Raiders; 23–21	Chiefs; 9–7	Game in Kansas City was played on Thanksgiving. Raiders win 1967 AFL Championship, but lose Super Bowl II.
1968	Tie 1–1	Chiefs; 24–10	Raiders; 38–21	Chiefs; 10–8	Both teams finish with 12–2 records, setting up a tiebreaker playoff game.
1968 Playoffs	Raiders 1–0	—N/a	Raiders; 41–6	Chiefs; 10–9	First postseason meeting. AFL Western Division. Raiders get home field based on a coin flip. Raiders record their largest victory over the Chiefs with a 35-point differential. Raiders go on to lose 1968 AFL Championship Game.
1969	Raiders 2–0	Raiders; 27–24	Raiders; 10–6	Raiders; 11–10	Raiders' win in Kansas City was the Chiefs' only home loss in the 1969 season.
1969 Playoffs	Chiefs 1–0	—N/a	Chiefs; 17–7	Tie; 11–11	Second postseason meeting. AFL Championship Game. Chiefs become the first Super Bowl representative (and champion) not to win their respective division. Chiefs go on to win Super Bowl IV.

1970s (Raiders, 12–6–2)

Season	Season series	at Kansas City Chiefs	at Oakland Raiders	Overall series	Notes
1970	Raiders 1–0–1	Tie; 17–17	Raiders; 20–6	Raiders; 12–11–1	As a result of the AFL–NFL merger, the Chiefs and Raiders are placed in the AFC West. In Kansas City, following a first down that appeared to secure a Chiefs' victory, a confrontation between Chiefs' WR Otis Taylor and Raiders' DE Ben Davidson escalated into a bench-clearing brawl, leading to offsetting penalties that negated the Chiefs' first down, compelling them to punt. The Raiders scored the game-tying field goal, marking the first tie between the two teams.
1971	Chiefs 1–0–1	Chiefs; 16–14	Tie; 20–20	Tie; 12–12–2	Last matchup at Municipal Stadium. This remains the most recent tie between the two teams.
1972	Tie 1–1	Chiefs; 27–14	Raiders; 26–3	Tie; 13–13–2	Chiefs open Arrowhead Stadium. Chiefs' win was their first win at Arrowhead Stadium.
1973	Tie 1–1	Chiefs; 16–3	Raiders; 37–7	Tie; 14–14–2	
1974	Raiders 2–0	Raiders; 7–6	Raiders; 27–7	Raiders; 16–14–2	
1975	Tie 1–1	Chiefs; 42–10	Raiders; 28–20	Raiders; 17–15–2	
1976	Raiders 2–0	Raiders; 24–21	Raiders; 21–10	Raiders; 19–15–2	Game in Kansas City was on Monday Night Football. Raiders win Super Bowl XI.
1977	Raiders 2–0	Raiders; 37–28	Raiders; 21–20	Raiders; 21–15–2	
1978	Raiders 2–0	Raiders; 20–10	Raiders; 28–6	Raiders; 23–15–2	Raiders win seven straight meetings (1975–1978) and seven straight home meetings (1972–1978).
1979	Chiefs 2–0	Chiefs; 35–7	Chiefs; 24–21	Raiders; 23–17–2	Chiefs' first road win against the Raiders for the first time since the 1969 AFL Championship. Chiefs sweep the Raiders for the first time since the 1964 season.

1980s (Raiders, 12–7)

Season	Season series	at Kansas City Chiefs	at Oakland/Los Angeles Raiders	Overall series	Notes
1980	Tie; 1–1	Raiders; 27–14	Chiefs; 31–17	Raiders; 24–18–2	In Oakland, Raiders' QB Dan Pastorini suffer a broken leg while replacement QB Jim Plunkett throws 5 interceptions. Raiders win Super Bowl XV.
1981	Chiefs 2–0	Chiefs; 27–0	Chiefs; 28–17	Raiders; 24–20–2	In Oakland, Chiefs overcame a 17–0 second half deficit. Last season until the 1995 season the Raiders played as an Oakland-based team.
1982	Raiders 1–0	Raiders; 21–16	canceled	Raiders; 25–20–2	Raiders relocate to Los Angeles. Due to the 1982 NFL players strike, the game scheduled in Los Angeles was canceled.
1983	Raiders 2–0	Raiders; 28–20	Raiders; 21–20	Raiders; 27–20–2	Raiders win Super Bowl XVIII. The Raiders sweep the Chiefs for the first time in L.A. and the first in any city since the 1978 season.
1984	Raiders 2–0	Raiders; 22–20	Raiders; 17–7	Raiders; 29–20–2	
1985	Tie 1–1	Chiefs; 36–20	Raiders; 19–10	Raiders; 30–21–2	
1986	Tie 1–1	Raiders; 24–17	Chiefs; 20–17	Raiders; 31–22–2	In Kansas City, Raiders overcame a 17–0 deficit.
1987	Tie 1–1	Chiefs; 16–10	Raiders; 35–17	Raiders; 32–23–2	Game in Los Angeles was played with replacement players due to the 1987 NFL players strike.
1988	Raiders 2–0	Raiders; 27–17	Raiders; 17–10	Raiders; 34–23–2	
1989	Tie 1–1	Chiefs; 24–19	Raiders; 20–14	Raiders; 35–24–2	

1990s (Chiefs, 18–3)

Season	Season series	at Kansas City Chiefs	at Los Angeles/Oakland Raiders	Overall series	Notes
1990	Chiefs 2–0	Chiefs; 9–7	Chiefs; 27–24	Raiders; 35–26–2	
1991	Chiefs 2–0	Chiefs; 24–21	Chiefs; 27–21	Raiders; 35–28–2	
1991 Playoffs	Chiefs 1–0	Chiefs; 10–6	—N/a	Raiders; 35–29–2	Third postseason meeting. AFC Wild Card. The remains the only time the Chiefs and Raiders met in the postseason since the AFL-NFL merger.
1992	Tie 1–1	Chiefs; 27–7	Raiders; 28–7	Raiders; 36–30–2	
1993	Chiefs 2–0	Chiefs; 24–9	Chiefs; 31–20	Raiders; 36–32–2	
1994	Chiefs 2–0	Chiefs; 13–3	Chiefs; 19–9	Raiders; 36–34–2	The game in Los Angeles was the Raiders' final game played as a Los Angeles-based team. Both teams finished with 9–7 records, but the Chiefs clinched the final playoff spot based on their head-to-head sweep, eliminating the Raiders from playoff contention.
1995	Chiefs 2–0	Chiefs; 23–17 (OT)	Chiefs; 29–23	Tie; 36–36–2	Raiders relocate back to Oakland.
1996	Tie 1–1	Chiefs; 19–3	Raiders; 26–7	Tie; 37–37–2	
1997	Chiefs 2–0	Chiefs; 30–0	Chiefs; 28–27	Chiefs; 39–37–2	
1998	Chiefs 2–0	Chiefs; 28–8	Chiefs; 31–24	Chiefs; 41–37–2	Chiefs won 11 straight home games (1989–1998). Game in Oakland was Marty Schottenheimer's last game as Chiefs' head coach.
1999	Tie 1–1	Raiders; 41–38 (OT)	Chiefs; 37–34	Chiefs; 42–38–2	In Oakland, Chiefs overcame a 34–20 fourth quarter deficit. In Kansas City, Raiders overcame a 17–0 deficit as their win eliminated the Chiefs from playoff contention. The 17-point blown lead tied a Chiefs franchise record for biggest blown lead (broken in 2005). Game in Kansas City was also the last game for Chiefs' star linebacker Derrick Thomas, who died 37 days later from injuries suffered in an automobile accident.

2000s (Chiefs, 12–8)

Season	Season series	at Kansas City Chiefs	at Oakland Raiders	Overall series	Notes
2000	Raiders 2–0	Raiders; 20–17	Raiders; 49–31	Chiefs; 42–40–2	In Oakland, the Raiders score their most points in a game against the Chiefs. Raiders sweep the Chiefs for the first time since the 1988 season and the first in Oakland for the first time since the 1978 season.
2001	Raiders 2–0	Raiders; 27–24	Raiders; 28–26	Tie; 42–42–2	Game in Kansas City was played with replacement officials.
2002	Tie 1–1	Chiefs; 20–10	Raiders; 24–0	Tie; 43–43–2	Beginning with their win, the Chiefs went on a 13-game home winning streak. Raiders lose Super Bowl XXXVII.
2003	Chiefs 2–0	Chiefs; 27–24	Chiefs; 17–10	Chiefs; 45–43–2	
2004	Chiefs 2–0	Chiefs; 31–30	Chiefs; 34–27	Chiefs; 47–43–2	Starting with their loss in Oakland, Raiders go on a 17-game losing streak against divisional opponents. Game in Kansas City was played on Christmas.
2005	Chiefs 2–0	Chiefs; 27–23	Chiefs; 23–17	Chiefs; 49–43–2	
2006	Chiefs 2–0	Chiefs; 17–13	Chiefs; 20–9	Chiefs; 51–43–2	
2007	Tie 1–1	Raiders; 20–17	Chiefs; 12–10	Chiefs; 52–44–2	Chiefs win nine straight meetings (2003–2007). Chiefs win' was their last of the 2007 season, as they ended the season on a 9-game losing streak. That losing streak extended to 12 games the following season. With their win, the Raiders snapped a 17-game losing streak against divisional opponents.
2008	Tie 1–1	Raiders; 23–8	Chiefs; 20–13	Chiefs; 53–45–2	Chiefs' win is their only road win in the 2008 season.
2009	Tie 1–1	Raiders; 13–10	Chiefs; 16–10	Chiefs; 54–46–2	Chiefs win seven straight road meetings (2003–2009).

2010s (Chiefs, 13–7)

Season	Season series	at Kansas City Chiefs	at Oakland Raiders	Overall series	Notes
2010	Raiders 2–0	Raiders; 31–10	Raiders; 23–20 (OT)	Chiefs; 54–48–2	In Kansas City, Raiders' win resulted in them sweeping the AFC West but still missing the playoffs, an NFL first.
2011	Tie 1–1	Raiders; 16–13 (OT)	Chiefs; 28–0	Chiefs; 55–49–2	
2012	Raiders 2–0	Raiders; 26–16	Raiders; 15–0	Chiefs; 55–51–2	This remains the most recent season in which the Raiders swept the season series against the Chiefs.
2013	Chiefs 2–0	Chiefs; 24–7	Chiefs; 56–31	Chiefs; 57–51–2	In Oakland, Chiefs score their most points in a game against the Raiders and clinch a playoff berth with their win. The game's final score is the highest-scoring game in the rivalry (87 points).
2014	Tie 1–1	Chiefs; 31–13	Raiders; 24–20	Chiefs; 58–52–2	Raiders' win snapped their 16-game losing streak and gave them their first win of the season after starting 0–10.
2015	Chiefs 2–0	Chiefs; 23–17	Chiefs; 34–20	Chiefs; 60–52–2	
2016	Chiefs 2–0	Chiefs; 21–13	Chiefs; 26–10	Chiefs; 62–52–2	Both teams finished with 12–4 records, but the Chiefs clinched the AFC West based on their head-to-head sweep.
2017	Tie 1–1	Chiefs; 26–15	Raiders; 31–30	Chiefs; 63–53–2	Raiders' win came after back-to-back holding calls against the Chiefs allowed 2 consecutive untimed downs. Following their loss, the Chiefs went on a 16 road-game division winning streak.
2018	Chiefs 2–0	Chiefs; 35–3	Chiefs; 40–33	Chiefs; 65–53–2	In Kansas City, the Chiefs clinch the AFC West, a first-round bye, and home-field advantage throughout the AFC playoffs as the AFC's #1 seed with their win.
2019	Chiefs 2–0	Chiefs; 40–9	Chiefs; 28–10	Chiefs; 67–53–2	Last season the Raiders played as an Oakland-based team. Chiefs win Super Bowl LIV.

2020s (Chiefs, 10–3)

Season	Season series	at Kansas City Chiefs	at Las Vegas Raiders	Overall series	Notes
2020	Tie 1–1	Raiders; 40–32	Chiefs; 35–31	Chiefs; 68–54–2	Raiders relocate to Las Vegas. Chiefs lose Super Bowl LV.
2021	Chiefs 2–0	Chiefs; 48–9	Chiefs; 41–14	Chiefs; 70–54–2	In Kansas City, Chiefs record their largest victory over the Raiders with a 39–point differential.
2022	Chiefs 2–0	Chiefs; 30–29	Chiefs; 31–13	Chiefs; 72–54–2	In Kansas City, Chiefs overcame a 17–0 deficit. In Las Vegas, Chiefs clinch the AFC's #1 seed with their win. Chiefs win Super Bowl LVII.
2023	Tie 1–1	Raiders; 20–14	Chiefs; 31–17	Chiefs; 73–55–2	Game in Kansas City was played on Christmas. Chiefs win Super Bowl LVIII, played in Las Vegas.
2024	Chiefs 2–0	Chiefs; 19–17	Chiefs; 27–20	Chiefs; 75–55–2	Game in Kansas City was played on Black Friday; Chiefs clinched a playoff berth with their win. Chiefs lose Super Bowl LIX.
2025	Tie 1–1	Chiefs; 31–0	Raiders; 14–12	Chiefs; 76–56–2	
2026	Chiefs 1–0	January 9/10	Chiefs; 30–27	Chiefs; 77–56–2	

Summary of Results

Season	Season series	at Dallas Texans/Kansas City Chiefs	at Oakland/Los Angeles/Las Vegas Raiders	Notes
AFL regular season	Tie 10–10	Tie 5–5	Tie 5–5	Texans/Chiefs have a 2–1 record in Dallas.
NFL regular season	Chiefs 65–45–2	Chiefs 34–21–1	Chiefs 31–24–1	
AFL and NFL regular season	Chiefs 75–55–2	Chiefs 39–26–1	Chiefs 36–29–1	
AFL and NFL postseason	Chiefs 2–1	Chiefs 1–0	Tie 1–1	AFL Western Division: 1968; AFL Championship Game: 1969; AFC Wild Card: 1991
Regular and postseason	Chiefs 77–56–2	Chiefs 40–26–1	Chiefs 37–30–1	Raiders have a 7–5 record in Los Angeles. Chiefs have a 26–22 record in Oakland and currently have a 6–1 record in Las Vegas.

== See also ==
- List of NFL rivalries
- AFC West
- American Football League
